= 1903 Australian House of Representatives election =

Australian federal election, 16 December 1903 House of Representatives << 1901–1906 >>
Enrolled voters	1,893,586				
Votes cast	739,402		Turnout	39.05	–12.34
Informal votes	18,463		Informal	2.50	+0.81
Summary of votes by party
Party	Primary votes	%	Swing	Seats	Change
Protectionist	210,738	29.23%	+1.71%	26	–1
Free Trade	228,721	31.73%	–1.48%	24	–1
Labour	214,713	29.78%	+11.53%	22	+7
Revenue Tariff	3,546	0.49%	+0.49%	1	+1
Independent	63,218	8.77%	–12.24%	2	–6
Total	720,936			75	

This is a list of electoral division results for the Australian 1903 federal election.

== New South Wales ==
1903 Australian federal election (New South Wales)
← 1901	16 December 1903	1906 →

All 26 New South Wales seats in the House of Representatives
- Registered: 687,049
- Turnout: 282,514 (41.12%)
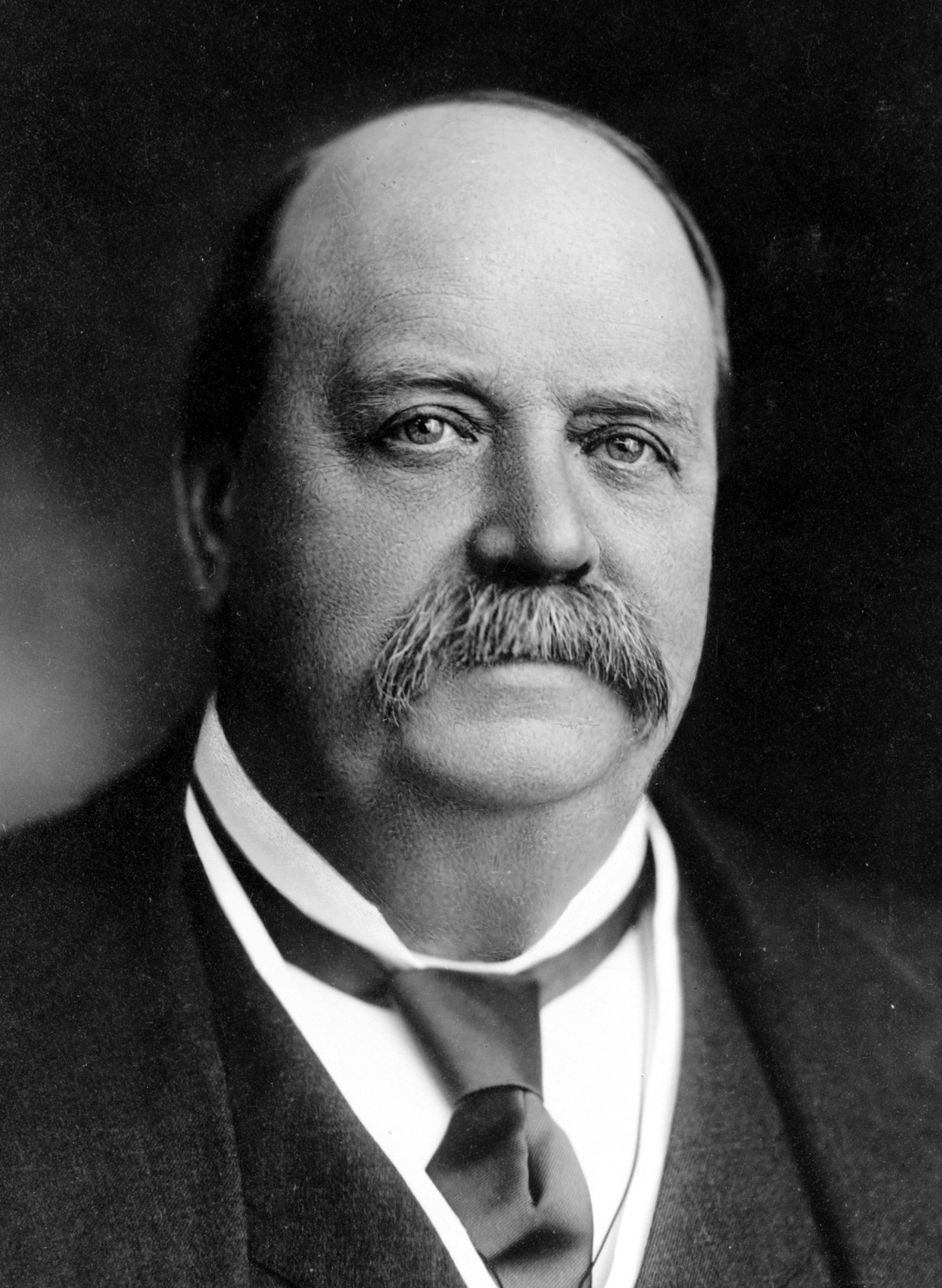

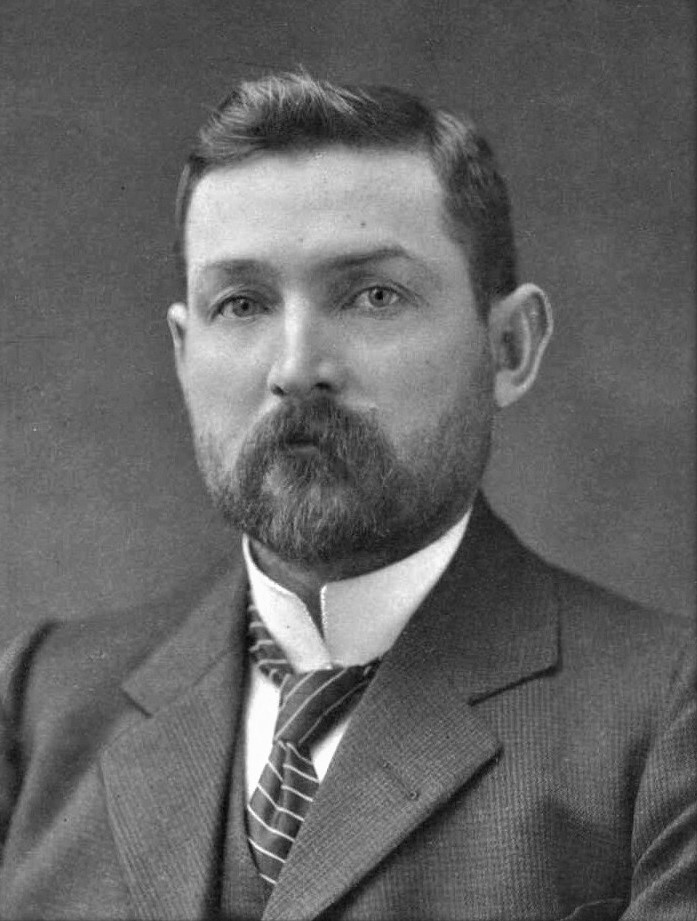

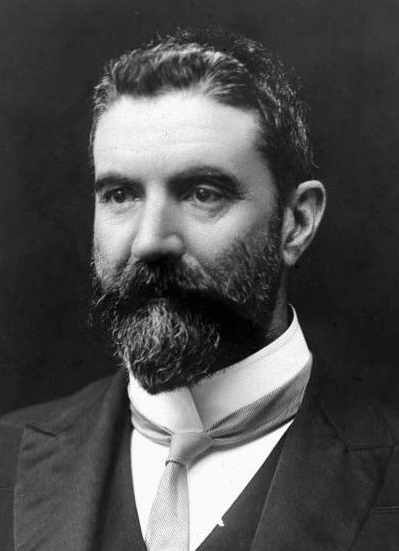
	First party	Second party	Third party
Leader	George Reid	Chris Watson	Alfred Deakin
Party	Free Trade	Labour	Protectionist
Last election	12 seats	6 seats	7 seats
Seats won	16	7	3
Seat change	▲4	▲1	▼4
Popular vote	150,381	58,492	41,702
Percentage	54.75%	21.29%	15.18%
Swing	▲13.27	▲3.13	▼11.38

=== Barrier ===
1903 Australian federal election: Barrier
Party	Candidate	Votes	%	±%
Labour	Josiah Thomas	6,217	82.0	−5.4
Ind. Protectionist	John Dunstan	1,367	18.0	+18.0
Total formal votes		7,584	97.7	
Informal votes		175	2.3	
Turnout		7,759	40.3	
Labour hold		Swing	−5.4	

=== Bland ===
1903 Australian federal election: Bland
Party	Candidate	Votes	%	±%
Labour	Chris Watson	4,779	55.4	−2.0
Free Trade	John Longmuir	3,854	44.6	+33.6
Total formal votes		8,633	96.4	
Informal votes		327	3.6	
Turnout		8,960	43.0	
Labour hold		Swing	−7.5	

=== Canobolas ===
1903 Australian federal election: Canobolas
Party	Candidate	Votes	%	±%
Labour	Thomas Brown	unopposed		
Labour hold		Swing		

=== Cowper ===
1903 Australian federal election: Cowper
Party	Candidate	Votes	%	±%
Free Trade	Henry Lee	7,456	63.0	+29.4
Protectionist	Francis Clarke	4,384	37.0	−1.3
Total formal votes		11,840	97.4	
Informal votes		328	2.6	
Turnout		12,168	47.6	
Free Trade gain from Protectionist		Swing	+15.4	

=== Dalley ===
1903 Australian federal election: Dalley
Party	Candidate	Votes	%	±%
Free Trade	William Wilks	12,814	74.9	+24.1
Ind. Protectionist	Selina Anderson	3,036	17.7	+17.7
Ind. Protectionist	William Burns	1,263	7.4	+7.4
Total formal votes		17,113	97.4	
Informal votes		457	2.6	
Turnout		15,570	51.1	
Free Trade hold		Swing	+17.4	

=== Darling ===
1903 Australian federal election: Darling
Party	Candidate	Votes	%	±%
Labour	William Spence	3,148	58.2	+13.8
Free Trade	Denis Acton	2,263	41.8	+10.8
Total formal votes		5,411	96.9	
Informal votes		171	3.1	
Turnout		5,582	36.6	
Labour hold		Swing	+1.5	

=== East Sydney ===
1903 Australian federal election: East Sydney
Party	Candidate	Votes	%	±%
Free Trade	George Reid	8,103	61.3	−6.7
Labour	Thomas Thrower	4,308	32.6	+32.6
Protectionist	Robert Peel	799	6.1	+6.1
Total formal votes		13,210	97.3	
Informal votes		362	2.7	
Turnout		13,572	38.8	
Free Trade hold		Swing	−7.9	

=== Eden-Monaro ===
1903 Australian federal election: Eden-Monaro
Party	Candidate	Votes	%	±%
Protectionist	Austin Chapman	unopposed		+
Protectionist hold		Swing		

=== Gwydir ===
1903 Australian federal election: Gwydir
Party	Candidate	Votes	%	±%
Labour	William Webster	4,395	53.5	+24.4
Free Trade	James Macarthur-Onslow	2,522	30.7	+17.1
Ind. Protectionist	Robert Barton	1,302	15.8	+15.8
Total formal votes		8,219	95.0	
Informal votes		431	5.0	
Turnout		8,650	38.7	
Labour gain from Protectionist		Swing	+24.3	

=== Hume ===
1903 Australian federal election: Hume
Party	Candidate	Votes	%	±%
Protectionist	Sir William Lyne	7,113	60.0	+5.9
Free Trade	Francis McLean	4,749	40.0	−5.9
Total formal votes		11,862	98.6	
Informal votes		166	1.4	
Turnout		12,028	54.1	
Protectionist hold		Swing	+5.9	

=== Hunter ===
1903 Australian federal election: Hunter
Party	Candidate	Votes	%	±%
Free Trade	Frank Liddell	7,697	59.3	+59.3
Ind. Protectionist	James Waller	4,241	32.7	+32.7
Labour	Arthur Rae	1,044	8.0	+8.0
Total formal votes		12,982	98.1	
Informal votes		256	1.9	
Turnout		13,238	49.1	
Free Trade gain from Protectionist		Swing	+59.3	

=== Illawarra ===
1903 Australian federal election: Illawarra
Party	Candidate	Votes	%	±%
Free Trade	George Fuller	unopposed		
Free Trade hold		Swing		

=== Lang ===
1903 Australian federal election: Lang
Party	Candidate	Votes	%	±%
Free Trade	Elliot Johnson	10,527	50.7	−34.8
Ind. Free Trade	William Cullam	5,552	26.7	+26.7
Labour	Tom Keegan	3,042	18.4	+8.4
Protectionist	Thomas Roseby	1,642	7.9	−10.1
Total formal votes		20,763	97.2	
Informal votes		599	2.8	
Turnout		21,362	54.9	
Free Trade hold		Swing	−16.3	

=== Macquarie ===
1903 Australian federal election: Macquarie
Party	Candidate	Votes	%	±%
Free Trade	Sydney Smith	6,410	54.0	+0.1
Protectionist	William Sandford	5,450	46.0	−0.1
Total formal votes		11,860	98.6	
Informal votes		170	1.4	
Turnout		12,030	58.8	
Free Trade hold		Swing	+0.1	

=== Newcastle ===
1903 Australian federal election: Newcastle
Party	Candidate	Votes	%	±%
Labour	David Watkins	9,839	62.5	−1.8
Free Trade	Richard Bowles	5,899	37.5	+2.6
Total formal votes		15,738	96.0	
Informal votes		653	4.0	
Turnout		16,391	46.0	
Labour hold		Swing	−2.2	

=== New England ===
1903 Australian federal election: New England
Party	Candidate	Votes	%	±%
Free Trade	Edmund Lonsdale	6,921	51.9	+7.3
Protectionist	William Sawers	6,423	48.1	+2.3
Total formal votes		13,344	96.9	
Informal votes		420	3.1	
Turnout		13,764	51.4	
Free Trade gain from Protectionist		Swing	+2.5	

=== North Sydney ===
1903 Australian federal election: North Sydney
Party	Candidate	Votes	%	±%
Free Trade	Dugald Thomson	unopposed		
Free Trade hold		Swing		

=== Parkes ===
1903 Australian federal election: Parkes
Party	Candidate	Votes	%	±%
Free Trade	Bruce Smith	15,610	73.9	+0.8
Labour	Charles Dyer	3,876	18.4	+18.4
Ind. Free Trade	Varney Parkes	1,318	6.2	+6.2
Ind. Free Trade	Edward Beeby	216	1.0	+1.0
Ind. Free Trade	Hampton Slatyer	90	0.4	+0.4
Total formal votes		21,110	97.6	
Informal votes		513	2.4	
Turnout		21,623	58.7	
Free Trade hold		Swing	+2.6	

=== Parramatta ===
1903 Australian federal election: Parramatta
Party	Candidate	Votes	%	±%
Free Trade	Joseph Cook	10,097	80.1	+18.8
Ind. Protectionist	John Strachan	2,506	19.9	+19.9
Total formal votes		12,603	95.4	
Informal votes		612	4.6	
Turnout		13,215	47.1	
Free Trade hold		Swing	+18.8	

=== Richmond ===
1903 Australian federal election: Richmond
Party	Candidate	Votes	%	±%
Protectionist	Thomas Ewing	6,096	72.6	+17.3
Free Trade	Reginald Atkinson	2,296	27.4	+27.4
Total formal votes		8,392	97.5	
Informal votes		214	2.5	
Turnout		8,606	45.3	
Protectionist hold		Swing	+17.3	

=== Riverina ===
1903 Australian federal election: Riverina
Party	Candidate	Votes	%	±%
Free Trade	Robert Blackwood	4,341	50.0	+3.5
Protectionist	John Chanter	4,336	50.0	−3.5
Total formal votes		8,677	97.6	
Informal votes		210	2.4	
Turnout		8,887	48.9	
Free Trade gain from Protectionist		Swing	+3.5	

=== Robertson ===
1903 Australian federal election: Robertson
Party	Candidate	Votes	%	±%
Free Trade	Henry Willis	5,592	63.5	+10.5
Ind. Protectionist	William Wall	3,212	36.5	+36.5
Total formal votes		8,804	97.3	
Informal votes		245	2.7	
Turnout		9,049	40.5	
Free Trade hold		Swing	+10.5	

=== South Sydney ===
1903 Australian federal election: South Sydney
Party	Candidate	Votes	%	±%
Free Trade	George Edwards	9,662	56.0	+14.6
Labour	Edward Riley	7,596	44.0	+6.0
Total formal votes		17,258	97.1	
Informal votes		511	2.9	
Turnout		17,769	55.9	
Free Trade hold		Swing	+4.3	

=== Wentworth ===
1903 Australian federal election: Wentworth
Party	Candidate	Votes	%	±%
Free Trade	Willie Kelly	13,894	71.8	+3.4
Protectionist	John Dalley	5,459	28.2	−3.4
Total formal votes		19,353	98.5	
Informal votes		286	1.5	
Turnout		19,639	62.6	
Free Trade hold		Swing	+3.4	

=== Werriwa ===
1903 Australian federal election: Werriwa
Party	Candidate	Votes	%	±%
Free Trade	Alfred Conroy	6,545	68.7	+16.8
Labour	Arthur Barrett	2,976	31.3	+31.3
Total formal votes		9,521	96.7	
Informal votes		322	3.3	
Turnout		9,843	46.7	
Free Trade hold		Swing	+16.8	

=== West Sydney ===
1903 Australian federal election: West Sydney
Party	Candidate	Votes	%	±%
Labour	Billy Hughes	7,272	69.9	−3.7
Free Trade	Edward Warren	3,129	30.1	+30.1
Total formal votes		10,403	96.2	
Informal votes		406	3.8	
Turnout		10,809	41.9	
Labour hold		Swing	−5.5	

== Victoria ==
1903 Australian federal election (Victoria)
← 1901	16 December 1903	1906 →

All 23 Victorian seats in the House of Representatives
- Registered: 612,472
- Turnout: 262,789 (42.91%)
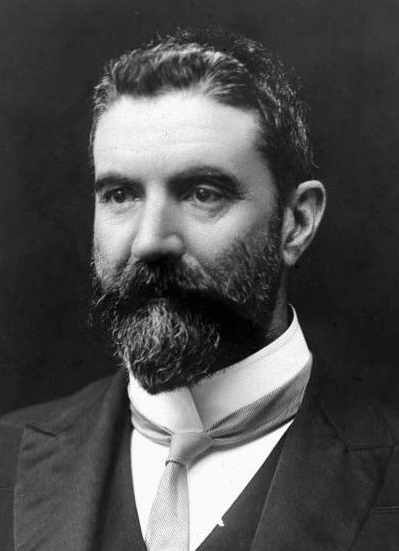

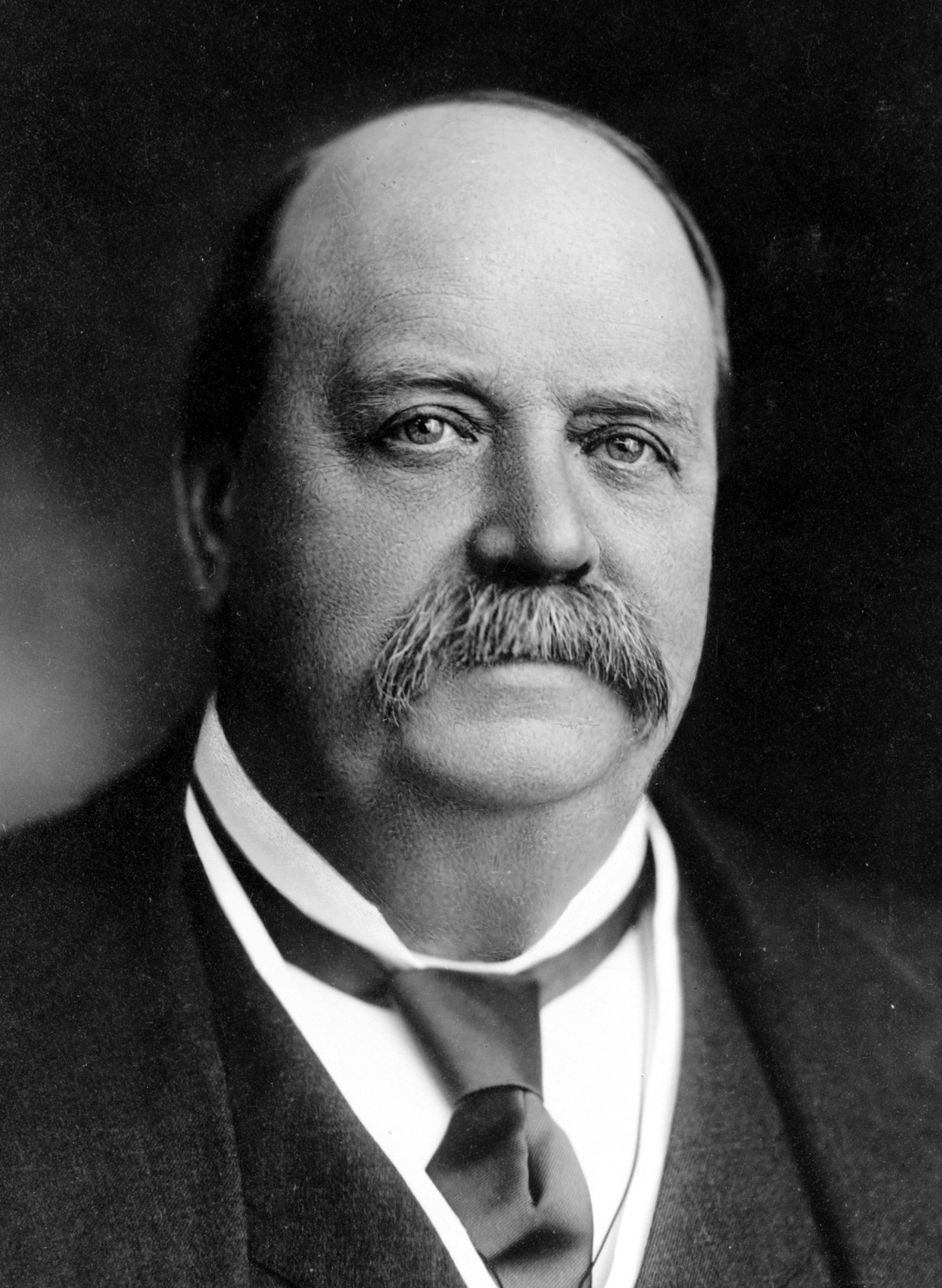

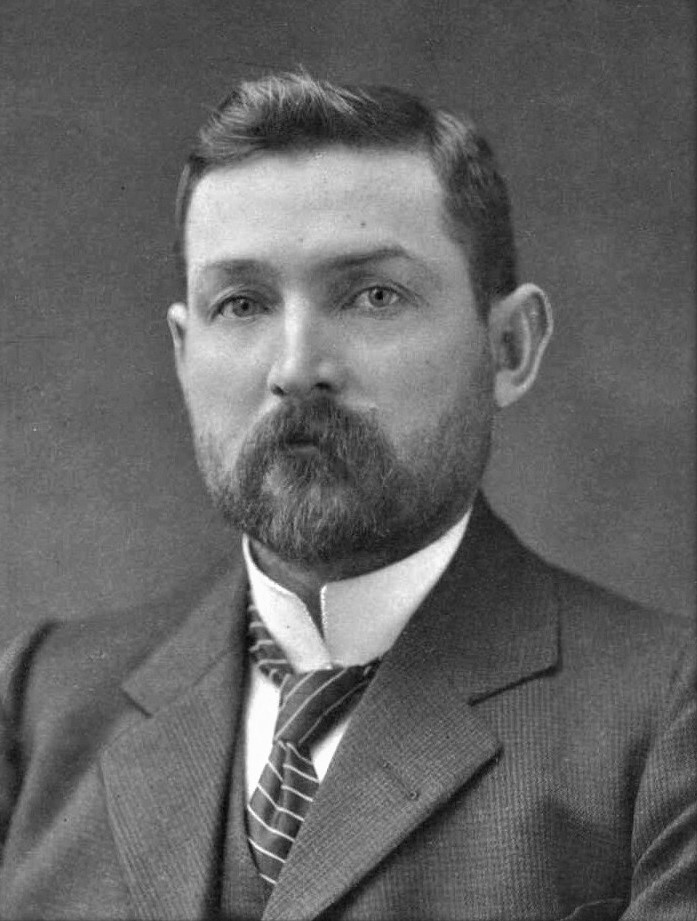
	First party	Second party	Third party
Leader	Alfred Deakin	George Reid	Chris Watson
Party	Protectionist	Free Trade	Labour
Last election	16 seats	4 seats	2 seats
Seats won	16	5	2
Seat change	Steady	▲1	Steady
Popular vote	106,644	55,308	69,516
Percentage	41.34%	21.44%	26.95%
Swing	▼3.04	▼2.03	▲18.27

=== Balaclava ===
1903 Australian federal election: Balaclava
Party	Candidate	Votes	%	±%
Protectionist	Sir George Turner	unopposed		
Protectionist hold		Swing		

=== Ballaarat ===
1903 Australian federal election: Ballaarat
Party	Candidate	Votes	%	±%
Protectionist	Alfred Deakin	unopposed		
Protectionist hold		Swing		

=== Bendigo ===
1903 Australian federal election: Bendigo
Party	Candidate	Votes	%	±%
Protectionist	Sir John Quick	6,020	41.9	−58.1
Labour	David Smith	5,704	39.7	+39.7
Free Trade	Cyril James	2,650	18.4	+18.4
Total formal votes		14,374	99.1	
Informal votes		129	0.9	
Turnout		14,500	57.3	
Protectionist hold		Swing	−58.1	

=== Bourke ===
1903 Australian federal election: Bourke
Party	Candidate	Votes	%	±%
Protectionist	James Hume Cook	8,657	42.4	+7.8
Labour	Martin Hannah	7,933	38.8	+21.1
Ind. Protectionist	Rothwell Grundy	3,841	18.8	+18.8
Total formal votes		20,431	98.5	
Informal votes		314	1.5	
Turnout		20,745	59.4	
Protectionist hold		Swing	−2.1	

=== Corangamite ===
1903 Australian federal election: Corangamite
Party	Candidate	Votes	%	±%
Free Trade	Gratton Wilson	4,600	35.2	+35.2
Ind. Protectionist	Desmond Dunne	4,036	30.8	+30.8
Protectionist	Agar Wynne	2,968	22.7	−49.5
Ind. Protectionist	John Woods	1,484	11.3	−16.5
Total formal votes		13,088	99.0	
Informal votes		138	1.0	
Turnout		13,226	55.5	
Free Trade gain from Protectionist		Swing	+35.2	

=== Corinella ===
1903 Australian federal election: Corinella
Party	Candidate	Votes	%	±%
Protectionist	James McCay	unopposed		
Protectionist hold		Swing		

=== Corio ===
1903 Australian federal election: Corio
Party	Candidate	Votes	%	±%
Protectionist	Richard Crouch	6,951	45.5	+3.7
Free Trade	Donald Macdonald	5,623	36.8	+23.4
Labour	John Reed	2,709	17.7	+17.7
Total formal votes		15,283	98.5	
Informal votes		225	1.5	
Turnout		15,508	60.7	
Protectionist hold		Swing	−4.3	

=== Echuca ===
1903 Australian federal election: Echuca
Party	Candidate	Votes	%	±%
Protectionist	James McColl	5,511	63.3	+9.3
Free Trade	Henry Williams	3,188	36.7	−9.3
Total formal votes		8,699	97.2	
Informal votes		254	2.8	
Turnout		8,953	44.3	
Protectionist hold		Swing	+9.3	

=== Flinders ===
1903 Australian federal election: Flinders
Party	Candidate	Votes	%	±%
Free Trade	James Gibb	5,194	36.3	−3.6
Protectionist	Arthur Nichols	3,917	27.3	−6.7
Labour	Arthur Wilson	2,971	20.7	+20.7
Ind. Protectionist	Louis Smith	2,242	15.7	+15.7
Total formal votes		14,324	98.8	
Informal votes		177	1.2	
Turnout		14,501	52.8	
Free Trade hold		Swing	+1.5	

=== Gippsland ===
1903 Australian federal election: Gippsland
Party	Candidate	Votes	%	±%
Protectionist	Allan McLean	unopposed		
Protectionist hold		Swing		

=== Grampians ===
1903 Australian federal election: Grampians
Party	Candidate	Votes	%	±%
Free Trade	Thomas Skene	3,836	36.3	−12.7
Protectionist	Archibald Ritchie	3,285	31.1	−5.7
Labour	Patrick McGrath	2,735	25.9	+25.9
Independent Labour	Albert Andrews	722	6.9	+6.9
Total formal votes		10,578	97.7	
Informal votes		254	2.3	
Turnout		10,832	49.8	
Free Trade hold		Swing	−3.5	

=== Indi ===
1903 Australian federal election: Indi
Party	Candidate	Votes	%	±%
Protectionist	Isaac Isaacs	unopposed		
Protectionist hold		Swing		

=== Kooyong ===
1903 Australian federal election: Kooyong
Party	Candidate	Votes	%	±%
Free Trade	William Knox	12,045	52.8	−4.6
Protectionist	Robert Barbour	10,768	47.2	+13.7
Total formal votes		22,813	98.4	
Informal votes		366	1.6	
Turnout		23,179	58.9	
Free Trade hold		Swing	−9.2	

=== Laanecoorie ===
1903 Australian federal election: Laanecoorie
Party	Candidate	Votes	%	±%
Protectionist	Carty Salmon	6,930	74.6	+22.5
Free Trade	David Bevan	2,358	25.4	+25.4
Total formal votes		9,288	96.8	
Informal votes		311	3.2	
Turnout		9,599	48.1	
Protectionist hold		Swing	+22.5	

=== Melbourne ===
1903 Australian federal election: Melbourne
Party	Candidate	Votes	%	±%
Protectionist	Sir Malcolm McEacharn	7,756	50.2	−10.6
Labour	William Maloney	7,679	49.8	+10.6
Total formal votes		15,435	98.6	
Informal votes		219	1.4	
Turnout		15,654	58.5	
Protectionist hold		Swing	−10.6	

=== Melbourne Ports ===
1903 Australian federal election: Melbourne Ports
Party	Candidate	Votes	%	±%
Protectionist	Samuel Mauger	9,646	55.5	−44.5
Labour	James Mathews	7,290	41.9	+41.9
Independent Labour	Harry Foran	443	2.5	+2.5
Total formal votes		17,379	97.8	
Informal votes		386	2.2	
Turnout		17,765	55.7	
Protectionist hold		Swing	−44.5	

=== Mernda ===
1903 Australian federal election: Mernda
Party	Candidate	Votes	%	±%
Protectionist	Robert Harper	5,178	53.0	+7.7
Free Trade	Frederick Hickford	2,807	28.8	+28.8
Ind. Protectionist	Edward Hodges	1,776	18.2	+18.2
Total formal votes		9,761	98.3	
Informal votes		166	1.7	
Turnout		9,927	45.2	
Protectionist hold		Swing	+8.3	

=== Moira ===
1903 Australian federal election: Moira
Party	Candidate	Votes	%	±%
Protectionist	Thomas Kennedy	5,385	54.0	−2.2
Free Trade	Albert Palmer	4,590	46.0	+2.2
Total formal votes		9,975	98.5	
Informal votes		156	1.5	
Turnout		10,131	48.3	
Protectionist hold		Swing	−2.2	

=== Northern Melbourne ===
1903 Australian federal election: Northern Melbourne
Party	Candidate	Votes	%	±%
Protectionist	Henry Higgins	11,595	70.3	+11.3
Labour	Samuel Painter	4,897	29.7	+29.7
Total formal votes		16,492	96.4	
Informal votes		609	3.6	
Turnout		17,101	48.1	
Protectionist gain from Ind. Protectionist		Swing	+1.3	

=== Southern Melbourne ===
1903 Australian federal election: Southern Melbourne
Party	Candidate	Votes	%	±%
Labour	James Ronald	9,057	47.7	+6.8
Ind. Protectionist	Charles Monteith	8,282	43.6	+43.6
Ind. Protectionist	Ernest Joske	1,066	5.6	+5.6
Ind. Protectionist	John Sloss	600	3.2	+3.2
Total formal votes		19,005	98.0	
Informal votes		390	2.0	
Turnout		19,395	54.2	
Labour hold		Swing	−4.0	

=== Wannon ===
1903 Australian federal election: Wannon
Party	Candidate	Votes	%	±%
Free Trade	Arthur Robinson	5,323	43.4	−1.4
Labour	Thomas White	4,611	37.6	+37.6
Protectionist	Patrick Hogan	2,318	18.9	−8.5
Total formal votes		12,252	98.3	
Informal votes		215	1.7	
Turnout		12,467	54.0	
Free Trade hold		Swing	−5.6	

=== Wimmera ===
1903 Australian federal election: Wimmera
Party	Candidate	Votes	%	±%
Protectionist	Pharez Phillips	3,263	39.0	−10.2
Free Trade	Max Hirsch	3,094	37.0	−1.0
Ind. Protectionist	John Gray	2,011	24.0	+24.0
Total formal votes		8,368	97.8	
Informal votes		185	2.2	
Turnout		8,553	51.2	
Protectionist hold		Swing	−4.6	

=== Yarra ===
1903 Australian federal election: Yarra
Party	Candidate	Votes	%	±%
Labour	Frank Tudor	13,930	68.2	+35.1
Protectionist	William Wilson	6,496	31.8	+3.2
Total formal votes		20,426	98.4	
Informal votes		327	1.6	
Turnout		20,753	55.8	
Labour hold		Swing	+15.9	

== Queensland ==
1903 Australian federal election (Queensland)
← 1901	16 December 1903	1906 →

All 9 Queensland seats in the House of Representatives
- Registered: 227,080
- Turnout: 115,731 (50.96%)
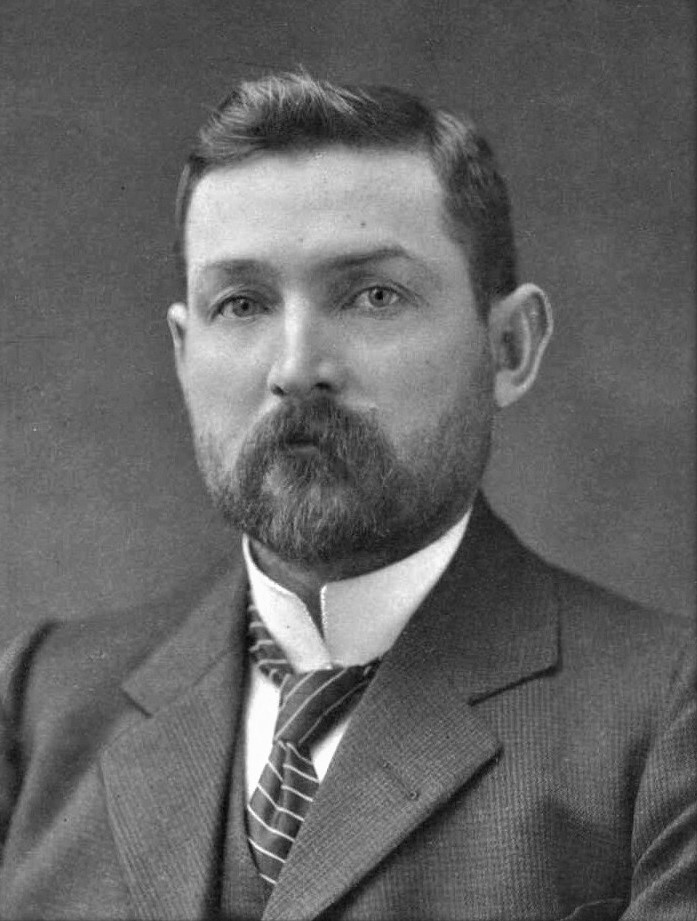

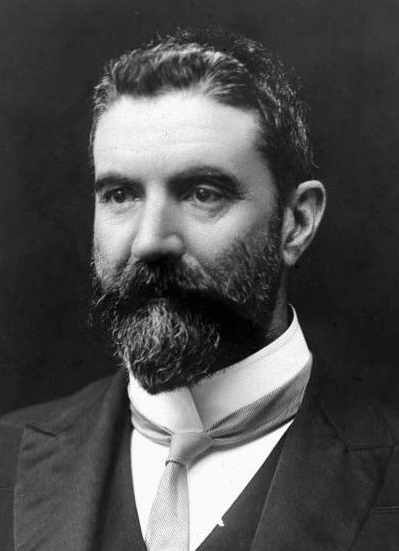
	First party	Second party
Leader	Chris Watson	Alfred Deakin
Party	Labour	Liberal
Last election	4 seats	—
Seats won	6	2
Seat change	▲2	▲2
Popular vote	56,937	44,562
Percentage	50.53%	39.55%
Swing	▲10.81	—

=== Brisbane ===
1903 Australian federal election: Brisbane
Party	Candidate	Votes	%	±%
Labour	Millice Culpin	8,019	46.8	+15.1
Liberal	William Morse	7,321	42.7	−4.1
Ind. Protectionist	Thomas Macdonald-Paterson	1,799	10.5	+10.5
Total formal votes		17,139	98.1	
Informal votes		327	1.9	
Turnout		17,466	51.2	
Labour gain from Protectionist		Swing	+9.7	

=== Capricornia ===
1903 Australian federal election: Capricornia
Party	Candidate	Votes	%	±%
Labour	David Thomson	6,065	49.6	+0.6
Liberal	George Curtis	3,725	30.5	+30.5
Ind. Protectionist	Thomas Ryan	2,435	19.9	+19.9
Total formal votes		12,225	97.2	
Informal votes		358	2.8	
Turnout		12,583	58.2	
Labour gain from Ind. Free Trade		Swing	+8.6	

=== Darling Downs ===
1903 Australian federal election: Darling Downs
Party	Candidate	Votes	%	±%
Liberal	Littleton Groom	unopposed		
Liberal hold		Swing		

=== Herbert ===
1903 Australian federal election: Herbert
Party	Candidate	Votes	%	±%
Labor	Fred Bamford	8,965	57.8	+6.2
Liberal	William White	6,549	42.2	-6.2
Total formal votes		15,514	95.5	
Informal votes		727	4.5	
Turnout		16,241	63.2	
Labour hold		Swing	+6.2	

=== Kennedy ===
1903 Australian federal election: Kennedy
Party	Candidate	Votes	%	±%
Labour	Charles McDonald	8,031	69.7	+6.8
Liberal	Frederick Johnson	3,493	30.3	-6.8
Total formal votes		11,524	96.5	
Informal votes		423	3.5	
Turnout		11,947	60.6	
Labour hold		Swing	+6.8	

=== Maranoa ===
1903 Australian federal election: Maranoa
Party	Candidate	Votes	%	±%
Labour	Jim Page	7,173	75.0	+21.7
Liberal	Daniel Leahy	2,390	25.0	-21.7
Total formal votes		9,563	97.2	
Informal votes		9,843	58.4	
Turnout		9,843	58.4	
Labour hold		Swing	+21.7	

=== Moreton ===
1903 Australian federal election: Moreton
Party	Candidate	Votes	%	±%
Independent Labour	James Wilkinson	6,941	55.8	+16.4
Liberal	George Harrison	5,508	44.2	+12.0
Total formal votes		12,449	98.3	
Informal votes		214	1.7	
Turnout		12,663	46.4	
Independent Labour hold		Swing	+2.2	

=== Oxley ===
1903 Australian federal election: Oxley
Party	Candidate	Votes	%	±%
Liberal	Richard Edwards	8,846	52.3	-0.9
Labour	William Reinhold	8,062	47.7	+0.9
Total formal votes		16,908	97.8	
Informal votes		382	2.2	
Turnout		17,290	55.2	
Liberal hold		Swing	-0.9	

=== Wide Bay ===
1903 Australian federal election: Wide Bay
Party	Candidate	Votes	%	±%
Labour	Andrew Fisher	10,622	61.2	+5.8
Liberal	George Stupart	6,730	38.8	-5.8
Total formal votes		17,352	98.0	
Informal votes		346	2.0	
Turnout		17,698	67.3	
Labour hold		Swing	+5.8	

== South Australia ==
1903 Australian federal election (South Australia)
← 1901	16 December 1903	1906 →

All 7 South Australian seats in the House of Representatives
- Registered: 167,775
- Turnout: 20,122 (11.99%)
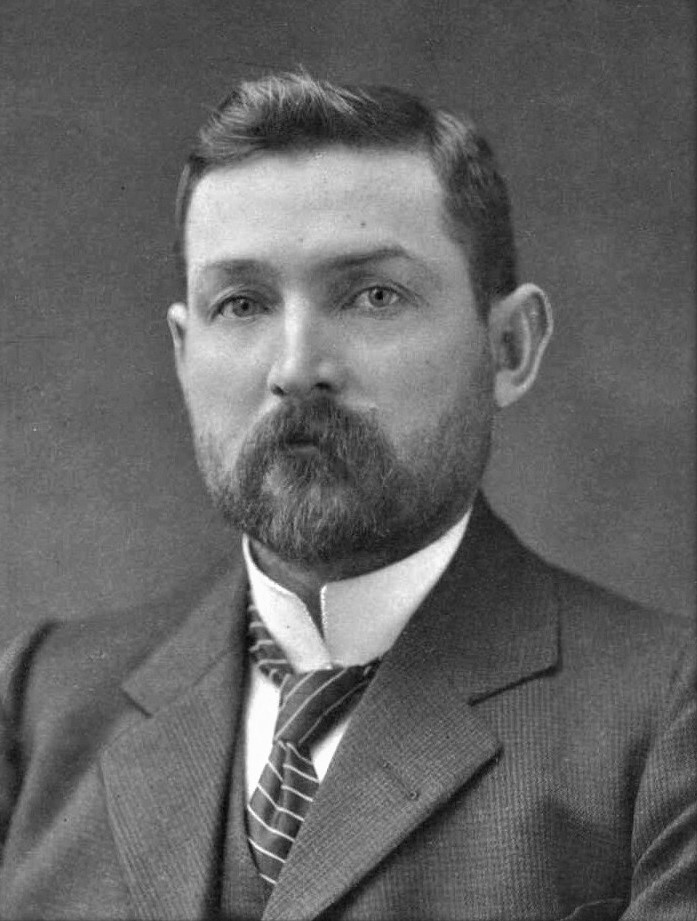

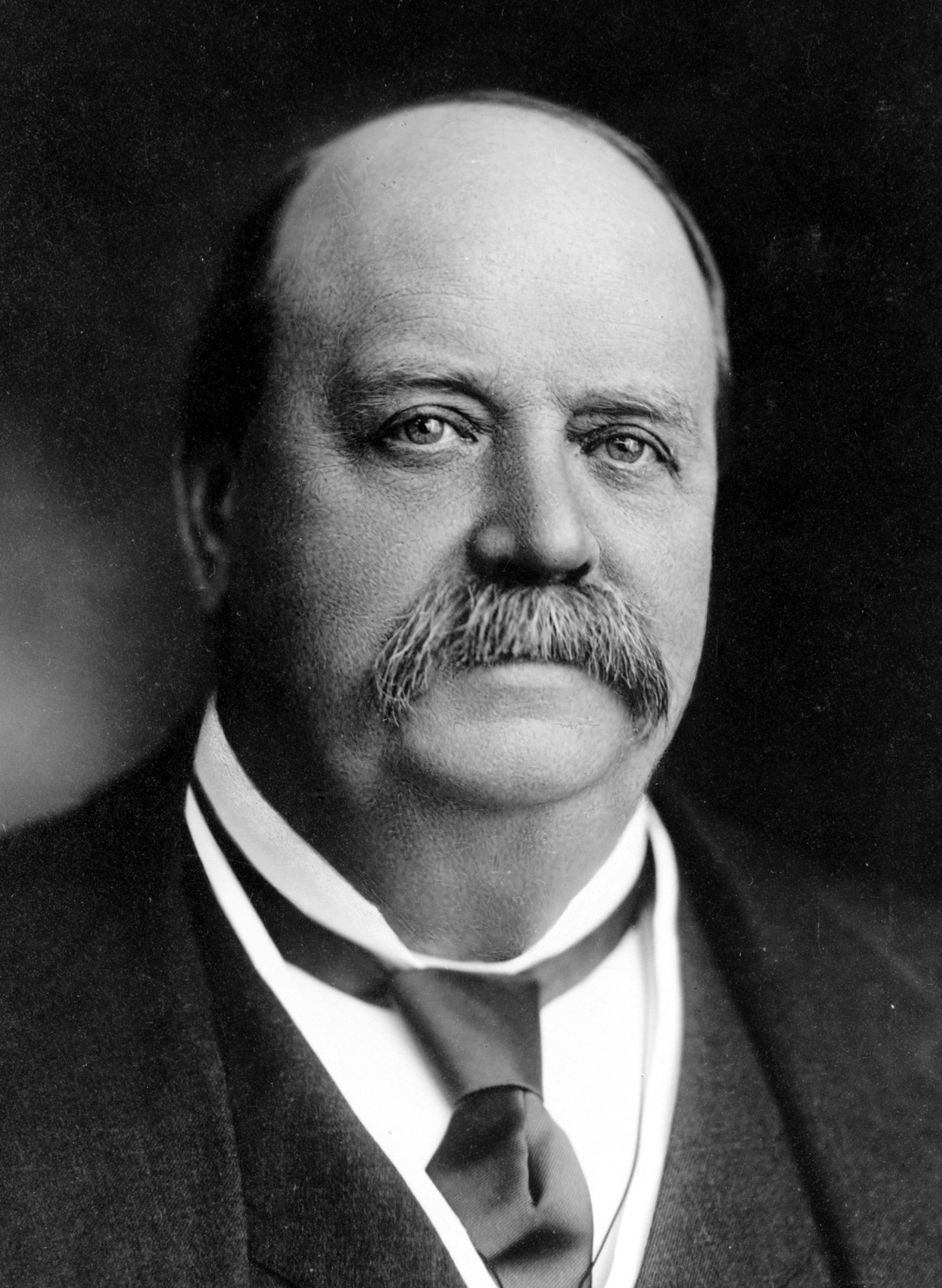

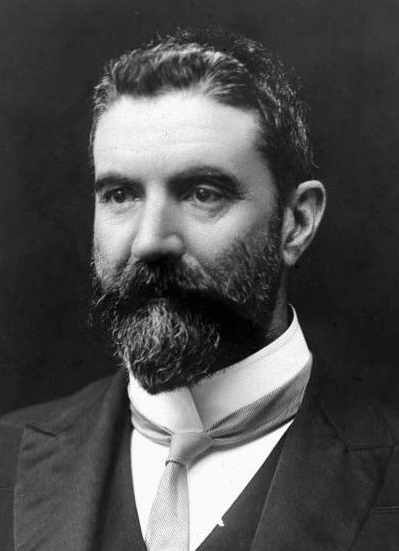
	First party	Second party	Third party
Leader	Chris Watson	George Reid	Alfred Deakin
Party	Labour	Free Trade	Protectionist
Last election	1 seat	4 seats	2 seats
Seats won	2	2	2
Seat change	▲1	▼2	Steady
Popular vote	11,778	4,802	3,000
Percentage	60.15%	24.53%	15.32%
Swing	▲44.26	▼25.68	▼18.08

=== Adelaide ===
1903 Australian federal election: Adelaide
Party	Candidate	Votes	%	±%
Protectionist	Charles Kingston	unopposed		
Protectionist win		(new seat)		

=== Angas ===
1903 Australian federal election: Angas
Party	Candidate	Votes	%	±%
Free Trade	Paddy Glynn	unopposed		
Free Trade win		(new seat)		

=== Barker ===
1903 Australian federal election: Barker
Party	Candidate	Votes	%	±%
Protectionist	Sir Langdon Bonython	unopposed		
Protectionist win		(new seat)		

=== Boothby ===
1903 Australian federal election: Boothby
Party	Candidate	Votes	%	±%
Labour	Lee Batchelor	5,775	54.6	+54.6
Free Trade	Vaiben Louis Solomon	4,802	45.4	+45.4
Total formal votes		10,577	97.5	
Informal votes		276	2.5	
Turnout		10,853	43.1	
Labour win		(new seat)		

=== Grey ===
1903 Australian federal election: Grey
Party	Candidate	Votes	%	±%
Free Trade	Alexander Poynton	unopposed		
Free Trade win		(new seat)		

=== Hindmarsh ===
1903 Australian federal election: Hindmarsh
Party	Candidate	Votes	%	±%
Labour	James Hutchison	6,003	66.7	+66.7
Protectionist	James Shaw	3,000	33.3	+33.3
Total formal votes		9,003	97.1	
Informal votes		266	2.9	
Turnout		9,269	37.9	
Labour win		(new seat)		

=== Wakefield ===
1903 Australian federal election: Wakefield
Party	Candidate	Votes	%	±%
Independent	Sir Frederick Holder	unopposed		
Independent win		(new seat)		

== Western Australia ==
1903 Australian federal election (Western Australia)
← 1901	16 December 1903	1906 →

All 5 Western Australian seats in the House of Representatives
- Registered: 116,942
- Turnout: 21,233 (18.16%)
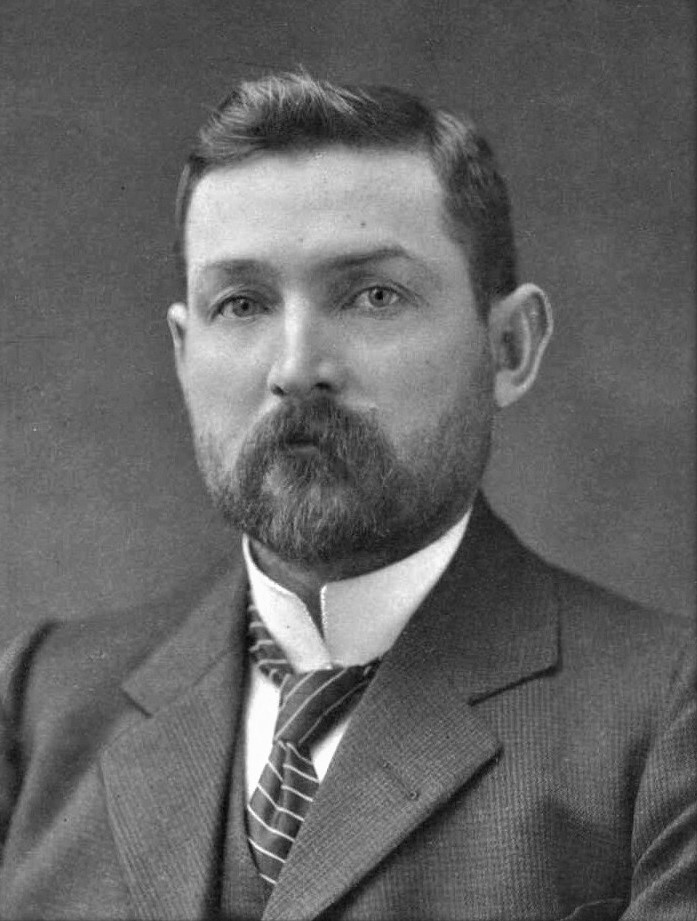

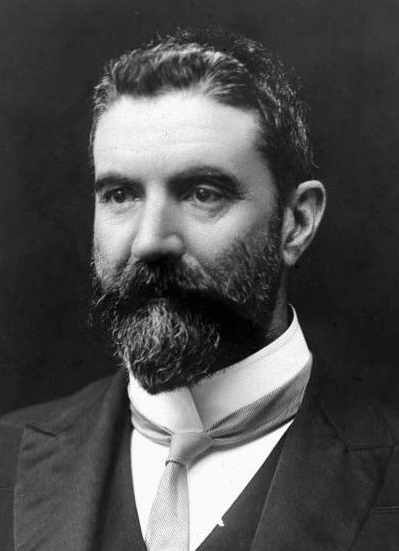

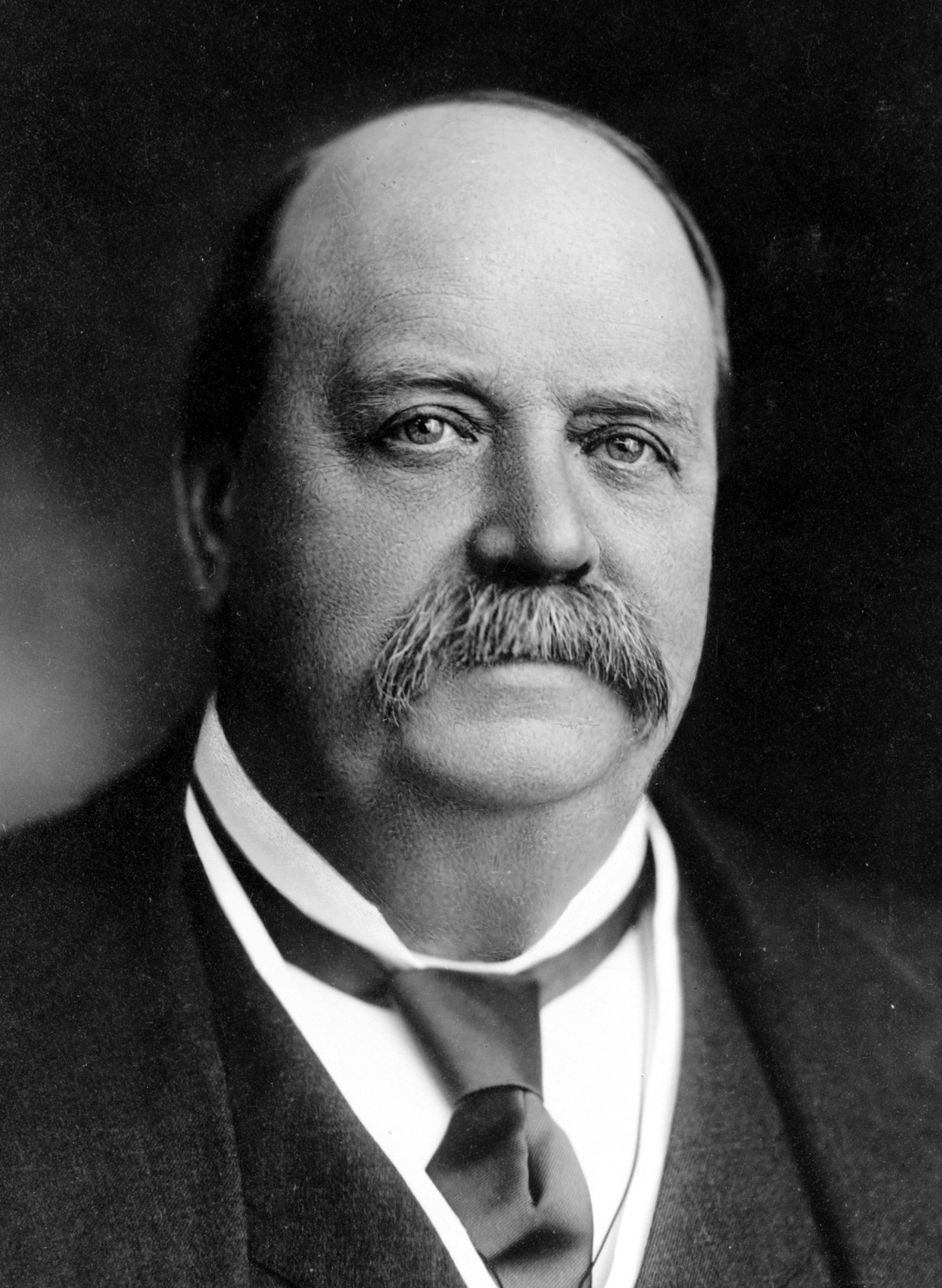
	First party	Second party	Third party
Leader	Chris Watson	Alfred Deakin	George Reid
Party	Labour	Protectionist	Free Trade
Last election	2 seats	1 seat	2 seats
Seats won	4	1	0
Seat change	▲2	Steady	▼2
Popular vote	13,507	N/A	6,678
Percentage	66.92%	N/A	33.08%
Swing	▲33.44	—	▼11.08

=== Coolgardie ===
1903 Australian federal election: Coolgardie
Party	Candidate	Votes	%	±%
Labour	Hugh Mahon	unopposed		
Labour hold		Swing		

=== Fremantle ===
1903 Australian federal election: Fremantle
Party	Candidate	Votes	%	±%
Labour	William Carpenter	3,439	61.3	+25.1
Free Trade	Elias Solomon	2,174	38.7	−18.0
Total formal votes		5,613	93.2	
Informal votes		408	6.8	
Turnout		6,021	30.9	
Labour gain from Free Trade		Swing	+21.6	

=== Kalgoorlie ===
1903 Australian federal election: Kalgoorlie
Party	Candidate	Votes	%	±%
Labour	Charlie Frazer	5,820	66.6	+66.6
Free Trade	John Kirwan	2,913	33.4	−30.7
Total formal votes		8,733	96.8	
Informal votes		286	3.2	
Turnout		9,019	38.9	
Labour gain from Free Trade		Swing	+30.7	

=== Perth ===
1903 Australian federal election: Perth
Party	Candidate	Votes	%	±%
Labour	James Fowler	4,248	72.8	+13.7
Free Trade	Harry Venn	1,591	27.2	+27.2
Total formal votes		5,839	94.3	
Informal votes		354	5.7	
Turnout		6,193	22.8	
Labour hold		Swing	+13.7	

=== Swan ===
1903 Australian federal election: Swan
Party	Candidate	Votes	%	±%
Protectionist	Sir John Forrest	unopposed		
Protectionist hold		Swing		

== Tasmania ==
1903 Australian federal election (Tasmania)
← 1901	16 December 1903	1906 →

All 5 Tasmanian seats in the House of Representatives
- Registered: 82,268
- Turnout: 37,013 (44.99%)
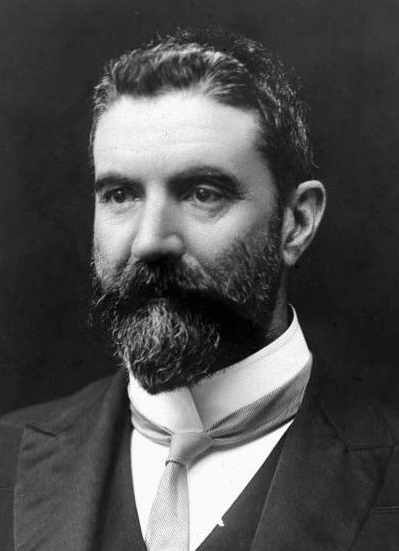

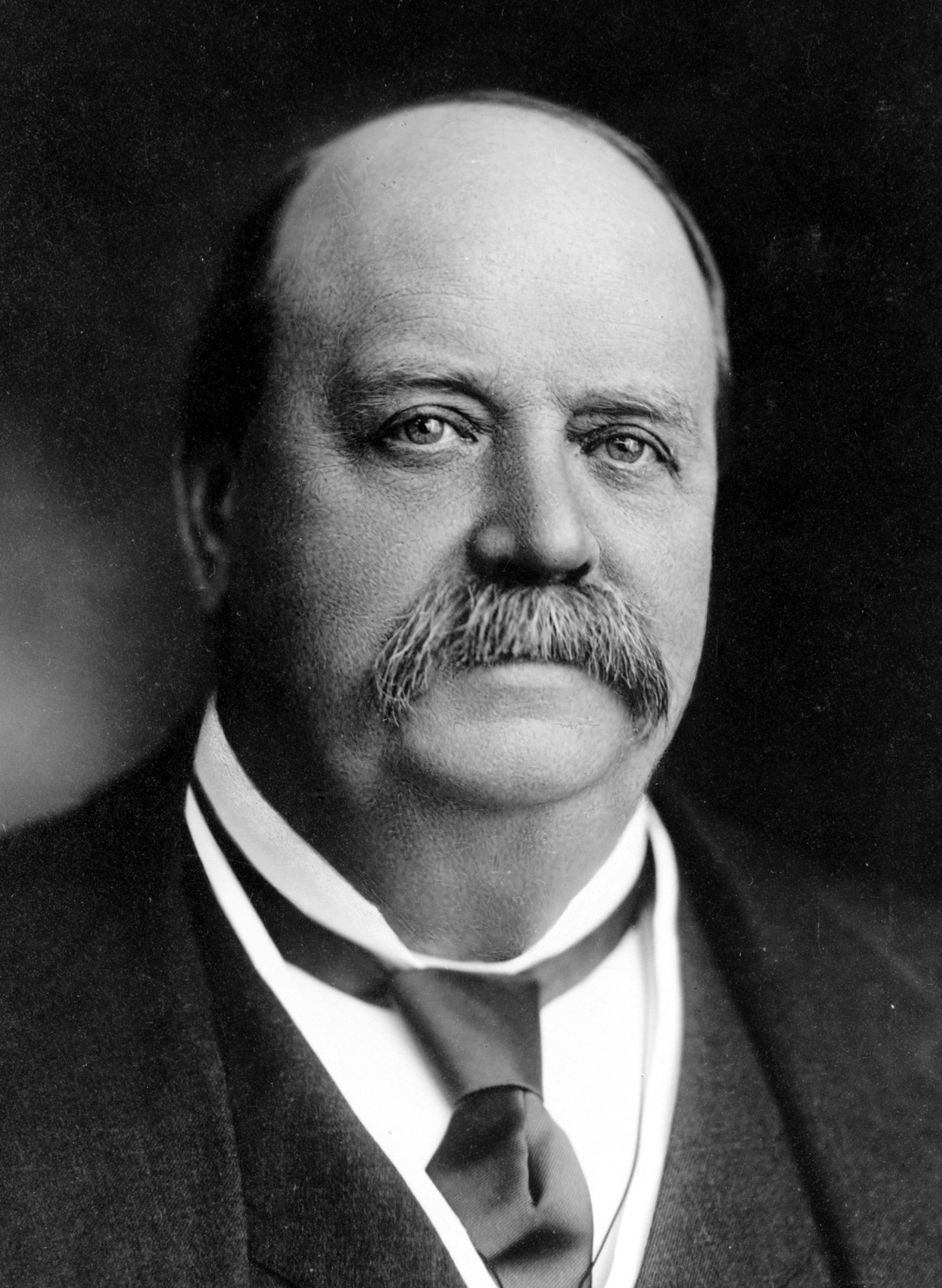

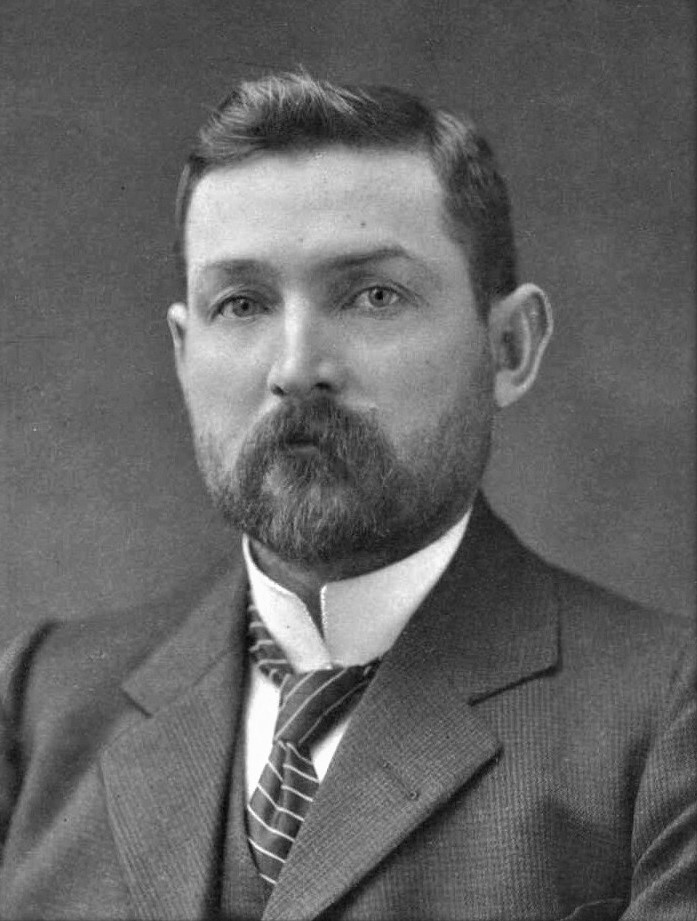

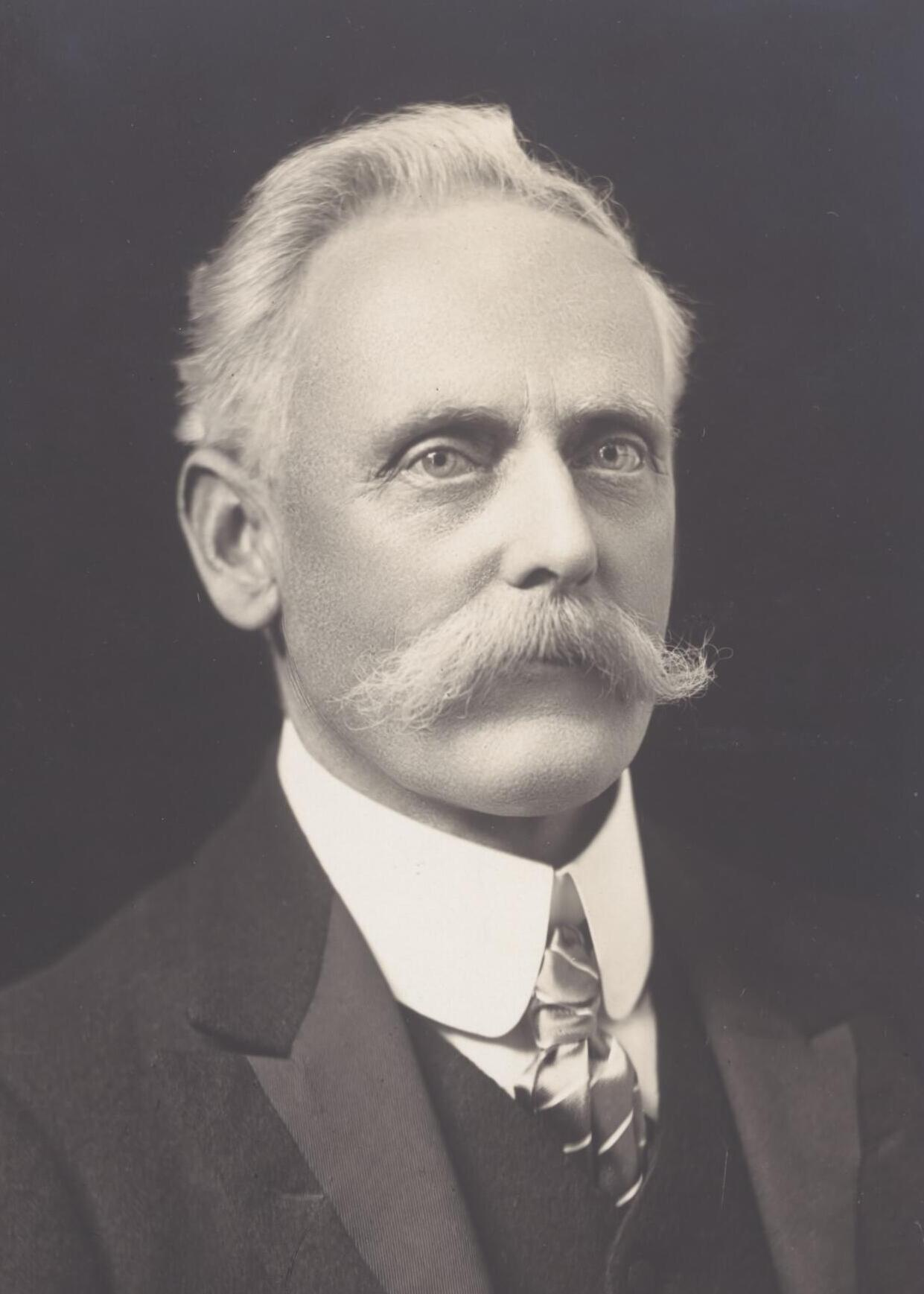
	First party	Second party	Third party
Leader	Alfred Deakin	George Reid	Chris Watson
Party	Protectionist	Free Trade	Labour
Last election	1 seat	3 seats	—
Seats won	2	1	1
Seat change	▲1	▼2	▲1
Popular vote	14,830	11,552	4,483
Percentage	41.37%	32.22%	12.51%
Swing	▲19.74	▼23.53	—
	Fourth party
Leader	William McWilliams
Party	Revenue Tariff
Last election	—
Seats won	1
Seat change	▲1
Popular vote	3,546
Percentage	9.89%
Swing	—

=== Bass ===
1903 Australian federal election: Bass
Party	Candidate	Votes	%	±%
Protectionist	David Storrer	4,092	56.7	+56.7
Free Trade	William Hartnoll	3,124	43.3	+43.3
Total formal votes		7,216	97.6	
Informal votes		181	2.4	
Turnout		7,398	42.1	
Protectionist win		(new seat)		

=== Darwin ===
1903 Australian federal election: Darwin
Party	Candidate	Votes	%	±%
Labour	King O'Malley	4,483	50.4	+50.4
Protectionist	James Brickhill	4,354	49.0	+49.0
Independent	James Gaffney	53	0.6	+0.6
Total formal votes		8,890	99.3	
Informal votes		458	4.9	
Turnout		9,348	58.0	
Labour win		(new seat)		

=== Denison ===
1903 Australian federal election: Denison
Party	Candidate	Votes	%	±%
Protectionist	Sir Philip Fysh	3,661	43.8	+43.8
Free Trade	Norman Cameron	3,630	43.4	+43.4
Independent	Andrew Kirk	1,064	12.7	+12.7
Total formal votes		8,355	97.0	
Informal votes		255	3.0	
Turnout		8,610	51.8	
Protectionist win		(new seat)		

=== Franklin ===
1903 Australian federal election: Franklin
Party	Candidate	Votes	%	±%
Revenue Tariff	William McWilliams	1,986	37.1	+37.1
Free Trade	Russell Macnaghten	1,485	27.8	+27.8
Revenue Tariff	William Clifford	785	14.7	+14.7
Revenue Tariff	Henry Tinning	775	14.5	+14.5
Independent	Wentworth Hardy	320	6.0	+6.0
Total formal votes		5,351	97.1	
Informal votes		162	2.9	
Turnout		5,513	33.9	
Revenue Tariff win		(new seat)		

=== Wilmot ===
1903 Australian federal election: Wilmot
Party	Candidate	Votes	%	±%
Free Trade	Sir Edward Braddon	3,313	54.9	+54.9
Protectionist	John Cheek	2,723	45.1	+45.1
Total formal votes		6,036	98.9	
Informal votes		108	1.8	
Turnout		6,144	39.1	
Free Trade win		(new seat)		

== See also ==
- 1903 Australian federal election
- Candidates of the 1903 Australian federal election
- Members of the Australian House of Representatives, 1903–1906
- Results of the 1903 Australian federal election (Senate)
