= Candidates of the 1903 Australian federal election =

This article provides information on candidates who stood for the 1903 Australian federal election. The election was held on 16 December 1903.

== By-elections, appointments and defections ==
=== By-elections and appointments ===
- On 14 September 1901, Littleton Groom (Protectionist) was elected to replace William Henry Groom (Protectionist) as the member for Darling Downs.
- On 26 March 1902, William Hartnoll (Free Trade) was elected to replace Frederick Piesse (Free Trade) as one of the five members for Tasmania.
- On 21 January 1903, Robert Reid (Free Trade) was appointed as a Victorian Senator to replace Sir Frederick Sargood (Free Trade).
- On 20 May 1903, Henry Saunders (Free Trade) was appointed as a Western Australian Senator to replace Norman Ewing (Free Trade).
- On 4 September 1903, George Reid (Free Trade) won the seat of East Sydney, which he had re-contested to assert his leadership.
- On 8 October 1903, Charles Mackellar (Protectionist) was appointed as a New South Wales Senator to replace Richard O'Connor (Protectionist).

=== Defections ===
- In 1902, Free Trade MP Alexander Poynton (Grey) joined the Labour Party.
- South Australian Free Trade MP Sir Frederick Holder had resigned from the party by the 1903 election after being elected Speaker of the House of Representatives in 1901. He contested the election as an independent, but was unopposed by the other parties.
- Queensland Protectionist MP Thomas Macdonald-Paterson (Brisbane) lost pre-selection and contested the election as an independent.
- Tasmanian Free Trade Senator Henry Dobson contested the election as a member of the Tariff Reform Party.
- Queensland Protectionist Senator Thomas Glassey lost pre-selection, and contested the election as an independent.

== Redistributions and seat changes ==
- South Australia and Tasmania, which for the first federal election were contested as single electorates for the House of Representatives:
  - South Australia was divided into seven electorates: Adelaide, Angas, Barker, Boothby, Grey, Hindmarsh and Wakefield. Of the seven members elected for the division of South Australia in 1901, Charles Kingston (Protectionist) contested Adelaide, Paddy Glynn (Free Trade) contested Angas, Sir Langdon Bonython (Protectionist) contested Barker, Lee Batchelor (Labour) and Vaiben Louis Solomon (Free Trade) contested Boothby, Alexander Poynton (Labour) contested Grey, Sir Frederick Holder (the Speaker) contested Wakefield, and no sitting members contested Hindmarsh.
  - Tasmania was divided into five electorates: Bass, Darwin, Denison, Franklin and Wilmot. Of the five members elected for the division of Tasmania in 1901, William Hartnoll (Free Trade) contested Bass, King O'Malley (Labour) contested Darwin, Sir Philip Fysh (Protectionist) and Norman Cameron (Free Trade) contested Denison, Sir Edward Braddon (Free Trade) contested Wilmot, and no sitting members contested Franklin.
- The Free Trade MP for Lang, Francis McLean, contested Hume.

== Retiring Members and Senators ==
=== Protectionist ===
- Sir Edmund Barton MP (Hunter, NSW)
- George Cruickshank MP (Gwydir, NSW)
- Chester Manifold MP (Corangamite, Vic)
- Senator Sir John Downer (SA)
- Senator Charles Mackellar (NSW)

=== Free Trade ===
- Samuel Cooke MP (Wannon, Vic)
- Arthur Groom MP (Flinders, Vic)
- Sir William McMillan MP (Wentworth, NSW)
- Senator John Ferguson (Qld) — seat declared vacant prior to election due to lack of attendance
- Senator Edward Harney (WA)
- Senator Robert Reid (Vic)

=== Independent ===
- Alexander Paterson MP (Capricornia, Qld)

== House of Representatives ==
Sitting members at the time of the election are shown in bold text. Successful candidates are highlighted in the relevant colour. Where there is possible confusion, an asterisk (*) is also used.

=== New South Wales ===
Electorate	Held by	Protectionist candidate	Free Trade candidate	Labour candidate	Other candidates
Barrier	Labour			**Josiah Thomas**	John Dunstan (Ind Prot)
Bland	Labour		John Longmuir	**Chris Watson**	
Canobolas	Labour			**Thomas Brown**	
Cowper	Protectionist	**Francis Clarke**	Henry Lee		
Dalley	Free Trade		**Bill Wilks**		Selina Anderson (Ind Prot); William Burns (Ind Prot)
Darling	Labour		Denis Acton	**William Spence**	
East Sydney	Free Trade	Robert Peel	**George Reid**	Thomas Thrower	
Eden-Monaro	Protectionist	**Austin Chapman**			
Gwydir	Protectionist		James Macarthur-Onslow	William Webster	Robert Barton (Ind Prot)
Hume	Protectionist	**Sir William Lyne**	**Francis McLean**		
Hunter	Protectionist		Frank Liddell	Arthur Rae	James Waller (Ind Prot)
Illawarra	Free Trade		**George Fuller**		
Lang	Free Trade	Thomas Roseby	Elliot Johnson	Tom Keegan	William Cullam (Ind FT)
Macquarie	Free Trade	William Sandford	**Sydney Smith**		
Newcastle	Labour		Richard Bowles	**David Watkins**	
New England	Protectionist	**William Sawers**	Edmund Lonsdale		
North Sydney	Free Trade		**Dugald Thomson**		
Parkes	Free Trade		**Bruce Smith**	Charles Dyer	Edward Beeby (Ind FT); Varney Parkes (Ind FT); Hampton Slatyer (Ind FT)
Parramatta	Free Trade		**Joseph Cook**		John Strachan (Ind Prot)
Richmond	Protectionist	**Thomas Ewing**	Reginald Atkinson		
Riverina	Protectionist	**John Chanter**	Robert Blackwood		
Robertson	Free Trade		**Henry Willis**		William Wall (Ind Prot)
South Sydney	Free Trade		**George Edwards**	Edward Riley	
Wentworth	Free Trade	John Dalley	Willie Kelly		
Werriwa	Free Trade		**Alfred Conroy**	Arthur Barrett	
West Sydney	Labour		Edward Warren	**Billy Hughes**	

=== Queensland ===
Electorate	Held by	Protectionist candidate	Labour candidate	Other candidates
Brisbane	Protectionist	William Morse	Millice Culpin	**Thomas Macdonald-Paterson** (Ind Prot)
Capricornia	Ind. Free Trade	George Curtis	David Thomson	Thomas Ryan (Ind Prot)
Darling Downs	Protectionist	**Littleton Groom**		
Herbert	Labour	William White	**Fred Bamford**	
Kennedy	Labour	Frederick Johnson	**Charles McDonald**	
Maranoa	Labour	Daniel Leahy	**Jim Page**	
Moreton	Ind. Labour	George Harrison		**James Wilkinson** (Ind Lab)
Oxley	Protectionist	**Richard Edwards**	William Reinhold	
Wide Bay	Labour	George Stupart	**Andrew Fisher**	

=== South Australia ===
Electorate	Protectionist candidate	Free Trade candidate	Labour candidate	Independent candidate(s)
Adelaide	**Charles Kingston**			
Angas		**Paddy Glynn**		
Barker	**Sir Langdon Bonython**			
Boothby		**Vaiben Louis Solomon**	**Lee Batchelor**	
Grey			**Alexander Poynton**	
Hindmarsh	James Shaw		James Hutchison	
Wakefield				**Sir Frederick Holder**

=== Tasmania ===
Electorate	Protectionist candidate	Free Trade candidate	Labour candidate	Other candidates
Bass	David Storrer	**William Hartnoll**		
Darwin	James Brickhill		**King O'Malley**	James Gaffney (Ind)
Denison	**Sir Philip Fysh**	**Norman Cameron**	Andrew Kirk	
Franklin		Russell Macnaghten		William Clifford (RT); Wentworth Hardy (Ind); William McWilliams* (RT); Henry Tinning (RT)
Wilmot	John Cheek	**Sir Edward Braddon**		

=== Victoria ===
Electorate	Held by	Protectionist candidate	Free Trade candidate	Labour candidate	Other candidates
Balaclava	Protectionist	**Sir George Turner**			
Ballaarat	Protectionist	**Alfred Deakin**			
Bendigo	Protectionist	**Sir John Quick**	Cyril James	David Smith	
Bourke	Protectionist	**James Hume Cook**		Martin Hannah	Rothwell Grundy (Ind Prot)
Corangamite	Protectionist	Agar Wynne	Gratton Wilson		Desmond Dunne (Ind Prot); John Woods (Ind Prot)
Corinella	Protectionist	**James McCay**			
Corio	Protectionist	**Richard Crouch**	Donald Macdonald	John Reed	
Echuca	Protectionist	**James McColl**	Henry Williams		
Flinders	Free Trade	Arthur Nichols	James Gibb	Arthur Wilson	Louis Smith (Ind Prot)
Gippsland	Protectionist	**Allan McLean**			
Grampians	Free Trade	Archibald Ritchie	**Thomas Skene**	Patrick McGrath	Albert Andrews (Ind Lab)
Indi	Protectionist	**Isaac Isaacs**			
Kooyong	Free Trade	Robert Barbour	**William Knox**		
Laanecoorie	Protectionist	**Carty Salmon**	David Bevan		
Melbourne	Protectionist	**Sir Malcolm McEacharn**		William Maloney	
Melbourne Ports	Protectionist	**Samuel Mauger**		James Mathews	Harry Foran (Ind Lab)
Mernda	Protectionist	**Robert Harper**	Frederick Hickford		Edward Hodges (Ind Prot)
Moira	Protectionist	**Thomas Kennedy**	Albert Palmer		
Northern Melbourne	Protectionist	**Henry Higgins**			Samuel Painter (Ind Prot)
Southern Melbourne	Labour			**James Ronald**	Ernest Joske (Ind Prot); Charles Monteith (Ind Prot); John Sloss (Ind Prot)
Wannon	Free Trade	Patrick Hogan	Arthur Robinson	Thomas White	
Wimmera	Protectionist	**Pharez Phillips**	Max Hirsch		John Gray (Ind Prot)
Yarra	Labour	William Wilson		**Frank Tudor**	

=== Western Australia ===
Electorate	Held by	Protectionist candidate	Free Trade candidate	Labour candidate
Coolgardie	Labour			**Hugh Mahon**
Fremantle	Free Trade		**Elias Solomon**	William Carpenter
Kalgoorlie	Free Trade		**John Kirwan**	Charlie Frazer
Perth	Labour		Harry Venn	**James Fowler**
Swan	Protectionist	**Sir John Forrest**		

== Senate ==
Sitting Senators are listed in bold. Tickets that elected at least one Senator are highlighted in the relevant colour. Successful candidates are identified by an asterisk (*).

=== New South Wales ===
Three seats were up for election. The Protectionist Party was defending one seat. The Free Trade Party was defending two seats. Free Trade Senators Albert Gould, Edward Millen and James Walker were not up for re-election.

Protectionist candidates	Free Trade candidates	Labour candidates	Socialist Labor candidates	Other candidates
Nathaniel Collins; John Cunneen	John Gray*; **John Neild***; **Edward Pulsford***	Arthur Griffith	Herbert Drake; James Moroney; Andrew Thomson	Mary Moore-Bentley (Ind); Henry Fletcher (Ind); Nellie Martel (Ind FT)

=== Queensland ===
Three seats were up for election. The Protectionist Party was defending one seat. The Free Trade Party was defending one seat. The Labour Party was defending one seat. Protectionist Senator James Drake and Labour Senators Anderson Dawson and William Higgs were not up for re-election.

Protectionist candidates	Labour candidates	Independent candidates
John Bartholomew; John Murray; Walter Tunbridge	Thomas Givens*; **James Stewart***; Harry Turley*	**Thomas Glassey**

=== South Australia ===
Three seats were up for election. The Protectionist Party was defending one seat. The Free Trade Party was defending one seat. The Labour Party was defending one seat. Protectionist Senator Thomas Playford and Free Trade Senators Sir Richard Baker and Sir Josiah Symon were not up for re-election.

Free Trade candidates	Labour candidates	Independent candidates
Robert Caldwell; **David Charleston**; William Copley	Robert Guthrie*; **Gregor McGregor***; William Story*	William Grasby; Crawford Vaughan

=== Tasmania ===
Three seats were up for election. The Protectionist Party was defending one seat. The Free Trade Party was defending two seats. Protectionist Senator John Keating, Free Trade Senator John Clemons and Labour Senator David O'Keefe were not up for re-election.

Protectionist candidates	Free Trade candidates	Labour candidates	Revenue Tariff candidates
**Cyril Cameron**; Edward Mulcahy*	**James Macfarlane***; Edward Miles; James Waldron	Milner Macmaster; James Mahoney; Charles Metz	Stafford Bird; **Henry Dobson***

=== Victoria ===
Four seats were up for election, one of which was for the short-term vacancy caused by Free Trade Senator Sir Frederick Sargood's death which had been filled in the interim by Free Trader Robert Reid. The Protectionist Party was defending two seats. The Free Trade Party was defending one seat. The Labour Party was defending one seat, although Senator John Barrett had been denied Labour endorsement and instead ran on the Protectionist ticket. Protectionist Senators Simon Fraser and Sir William Zeal were not up for re-election.

Protectionist candidates	Free Trade candidates	Labour candidates	Other candidates
**John Barrett**; **Robert Best***; John Dow; **James Styles***	Frederick Derham; Sir John McIntyre; Edmund Smith; John Templeton	Stephen Barker; Edward Findley*; John Lemmon; Robert Solly	Vida Goldstein (Ind Prot); William McCulloch (Ind Prot); Sir Bryan O'Loghlen (Ind Prot); William Trenwith* (Ind Lab); Henry Williams (Ind FT); George Wise (Ind Prot)

=== Western Australia ===
Three seats were up for election. The Free Trade Party was defending two seats. The Labor Party was defending one seat. Free Trade Senators Alexander Matheson and Staniforth Smith and Labour Senator George Pearce were not up for re-election.

Protectionist candidates	Free Trade candidates	Labour candidates
Michael Cavanagh; Samuel Moore	William Martin; Herbert Preston; **Henry Saunders**	John Croft*; **Hugh de Largie***; George Henderson*

== See also ==
- 1903 Australian federal election
- Members of the Australian House of Representatives, 1901–1903
- Members of the Australian House of Representatives, 1903–1906
- Members of the Australian Senate, 1901–1903
- Members of the Australian Senate, 1904–1906
- List of political parties in Australia
