= 1903 Australian Senate election =

Senate elections for Australia in December 1903

← 1901	16 December 1903	1906 →

19 of the 36 seats in the Senate 18 seats needed for a majority
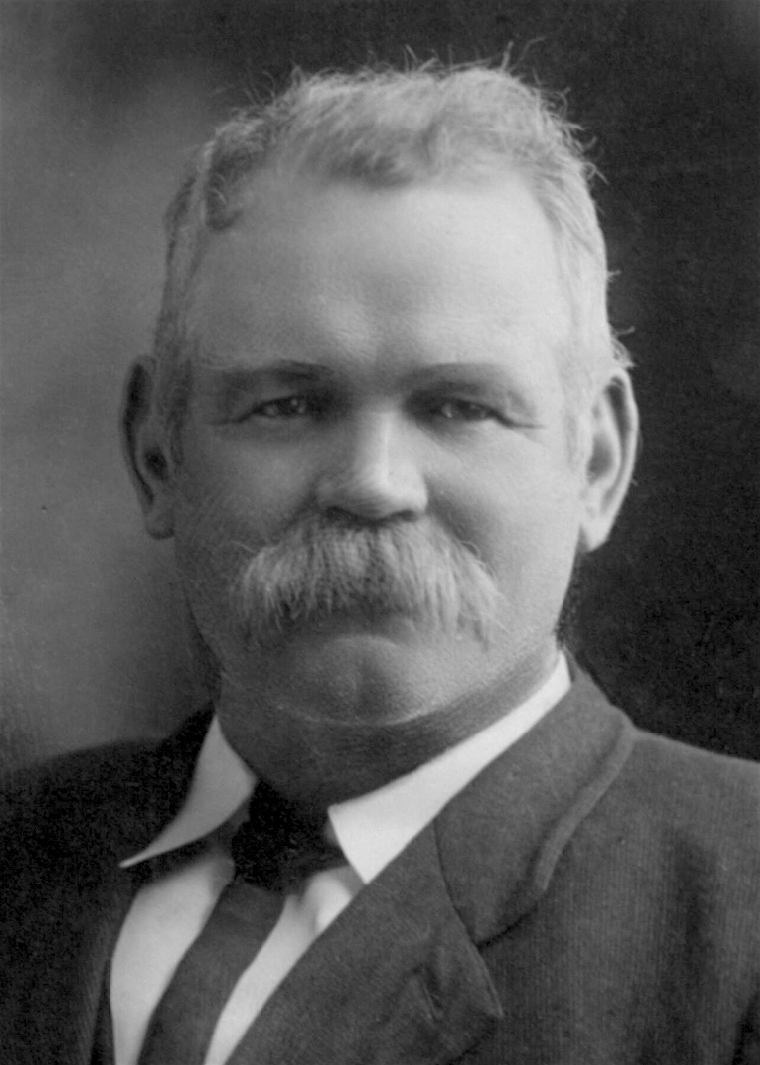

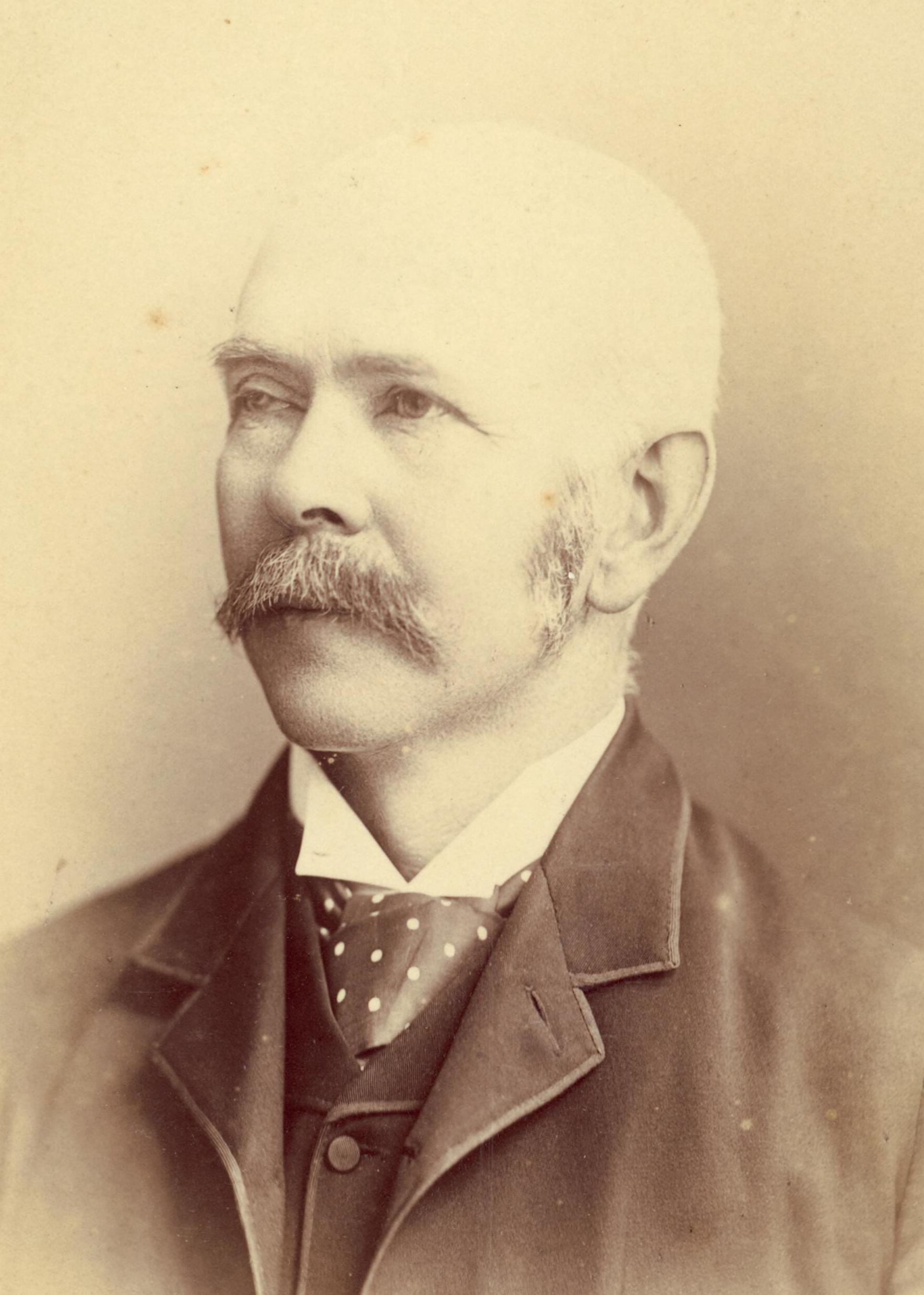

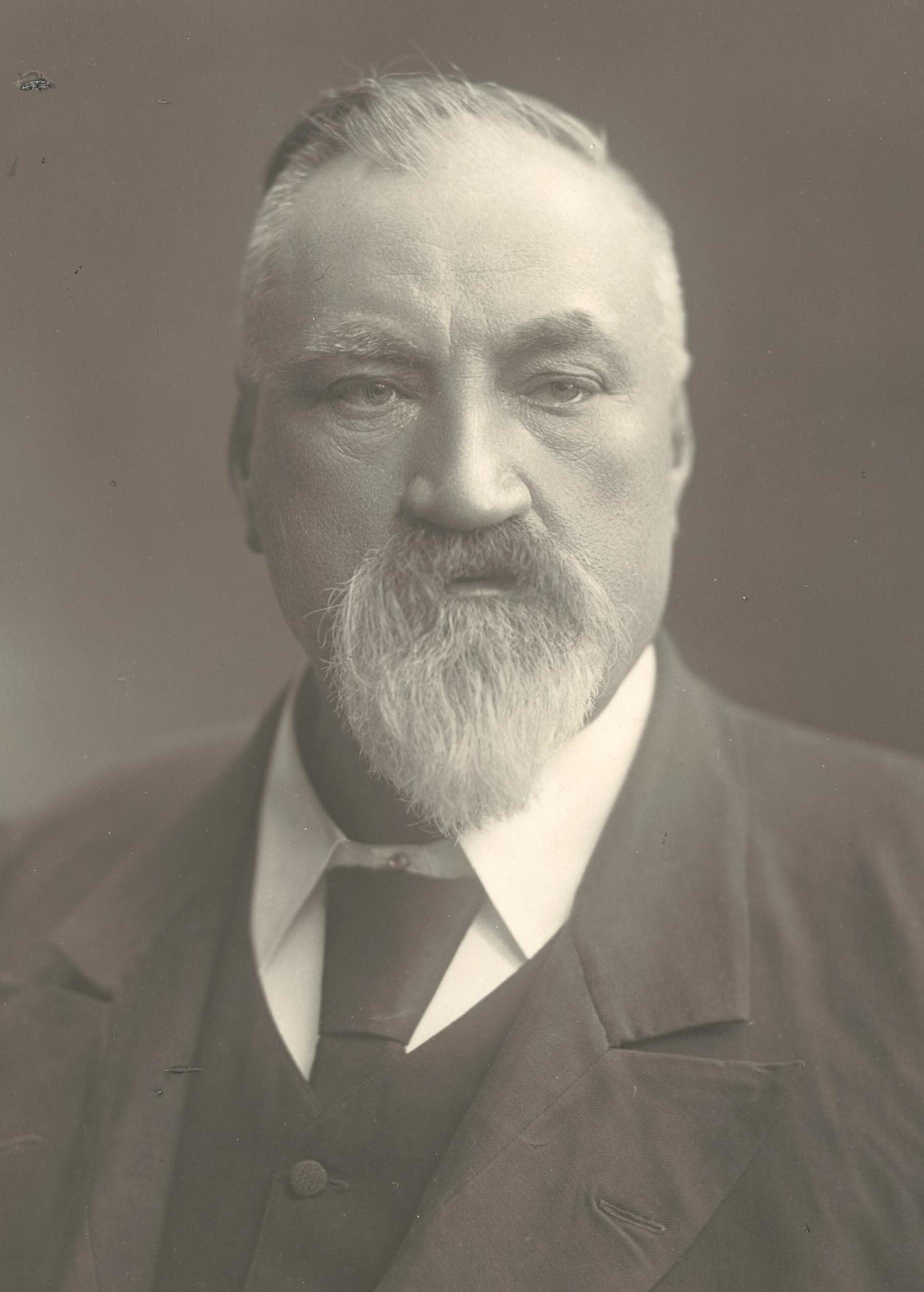

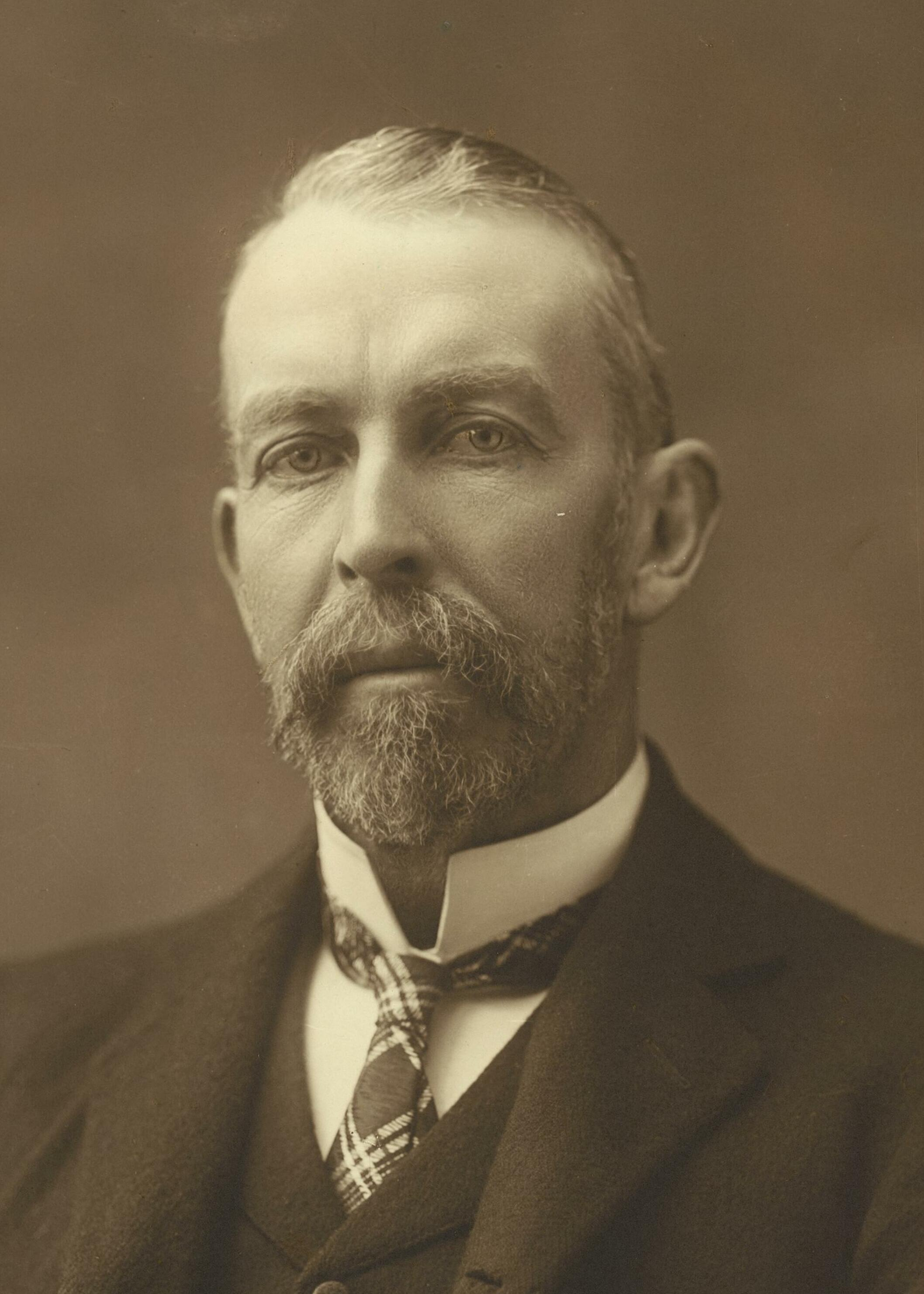
	First party	Second party
Leader	Gregor McGregor	Josiah Symon
Party	Labor	Free Trade
Leader's seat	South Australia	South Australia
Seats before	7	17
Seats won	10	4
Seats after	14	14
Seat change	▲4	▼3
Popular vote	784,859	986,030
Percentage	27.33%	34.33%
Swing	▲13.88pp	▼5.11pp
	Third party	Fourth party
Leader	Tom Playford	Henry Dobson
Party	Protectionist	Revenue Tariff
Leader's seat	South Australia	Tasmania
Seats before	10	—
Seats won	3	1
Seats after	7	1
Seat change	▼3	New
Popular vote	503,586	25,310
Percentage	17.53%	0.88%
Swing	▼27.33pp	New

The Australian states each elected three members of the Australian Senate at the 1903 federal election to serve a six-year term starting on 1 January 1904.

== Australia ==
1903 Australian federal election: Senate (FPTP BV)
Party	Votes	%	±	Seats		
Party	Votes	%	±	Seats won	Seats after	Seat change
Free Trade	986,030	34.33	−5.11	4	12	▼3
Labour	784,859	27.33	+13.83	10	14	▲4
Protectionist	503,586	17.53	−27.33	3	8	▼3
National Liberal Union	136,727	4.76	+4.76	0	0	Steady
Socialist Labor	69,769	2.43	+1.41	0	0	Steady
Revenue Tariff	25,310	0.88	+0.88	1	1	▲1
Independent	365,851	12.74	−8.60	1	1	▲1
Formal votes	2,872,132					
Total						
Registered voters / turnout	1,893,586	46.86				

== New South Wales ==
Each elector voted for up to three candidates. Percentages refer to the number of voters rather than the number of votes.

1903 Australian federal election: Senate, New South Wales
Party	Candidate	Votes	%	±%
Free Trade	John Neild (re-elected 1)	192,987	61.6	
Free Trade	Edward Pulsford (re-elected 2)	191,170	61.0	
Free Trade	John Gray (elected 3)	188,860	60.3	
Labour	Arthur Griffith	108,312	34.6	
Protectionist	Nathaniel Collins	66,763	21.3	
Protectionist	John Cunneen	60,200	19.2	
Socialist Labor	Andrew Thomson	25,976	8.3	
Socialist Labor	James Moroney	25924	8.3	
Independent	Henry Fletcher	23,555	7.5	
Independent	Mary Bentley	19,254	6.1	
Ind. Free Trade	Nellie Martel	18,846	6.0	
Socialist Labor	Herbert Drake	17,870	5.7	
Total formal votes		939,717; 313,239 voters	95.2	
Informal votes		15,740	4.8	
Turnout		328,979	47.9	
Party total votes
Free Trade		573,017	61.0	
Protectionist		126,963	13.5	
Labour		108,312	11.5	
Socialist Labor		69,770	7.4	
Independent		61,655	6.6	

== Queensland ==
Each elector voted for up to three candidates. Percentages refer to the number of voters rather than the number of votes.

1903 Australian federal election: Senate, Queensland
Party	Candidate	Votes	%	±%
Labour	Harry Turley (elected 1)	66,074	55.1	
Labour	James Stewart (re-elected 2)	64,077	53.5	
Labour	Thomas Givens (elected 3)	62,088	51.8	
Liberal	Walter Tunbridge	47,927	40.0	
Liberal	John Bartholomew	47,081	39.2	
Liberal	John Murray	41,719	34.8	
Ind. Protectionist	Thomas Glassey (defeated)	30,720	25.6	
Total formal votes		359,623; 119,895 voters	96.3	
Informal votes		4,612	3.7	
Turnout		124,507	54.8	
Party total votes
Labour		192,239	53.5	
Liberal		136,664	38.0	
Independent		30,720	8.5	

== South Australia ==
Each elector voted for up to three candidates. Percentages refer to the number of voters rather than the number of votes.

1903 Australian federal election: Senate, South Australia
Party	Candidate	Votes	%	±%
Labour	Gregor McGregor (re-elected 1)	31,082	58.0	
Labour	Robert Guthrie (elected 2)	28,376	53.0	
Labour	William Story (elected 3)	23,083	43.1	
Free Trade	David Charleston (defeated)	22,499	42.0	
Free Trade	William Copley	19,402	36.2	
Free Trade	Robert Caldwell	19,400	36.2	
Independent	Crawford Vaughan	8,595	16.0	
Independent	William Grasby	8,294	15.5	
Total formal votes		160,731; 53,577 voters	97.8	
Informal votes		1,208	2.2	
Turnout		53,577	32.4	
Party total votes
Labour		82,541	51.4	
Free Trade		61,301	38.1	
Independent		16,889	10.5	

== Tasmania ==
Each elector voted for up to three candidates. Percentages refer to the number of voters rather than the number of votes.

1903 Australian federal election: Senate, Tasmania
Party	Candidate	Votes	%	±%
Revenue Tariff	Henry Dobson (re-elected 1)	17,979	50.6	
Free Trade	James Macfarlane (re-elected 2)	15,796	44.4	
Protectionist	Edward Mulcahy (elected 3)	12,762	35.9	
Protectionist	Cyril Cameron (defeated)	12,094	34.0	
Labour	Milner Macmaster	11,333	31.9	
Labour	Charles Metz	9,776	27.5	
Labour	James Mahoney	8,728	24.6	
Revenue Tariff	Stafford Bird	7,331	20.6	
Free Trade	James Waldron	6,776	19.1	
Free Trade	Edward Miles	4,062	11.4	
Total formal votes		106,637; 35,546 voters	96.1	
Informal votes		1,441	3.9	
Turnout		36,987	45.0	
Party total votes
Labour		29,837	28.0	
Free Trade		26,634	25.0	
Revenue Tariff		25,310	23.7	
Protectionist		24,856	23.3	

== Victoria ==
There were four vacancies in Victoria due to the death of Sir Frederick Sargood. Robert Reid (Free Trade) had filled the seat in the interim, with the fourth senator elected serving the balance of Sargood's term ending on 31 December 1906. Each elector voted for up to four candidates. Percentages refer to the number of voters rather than the number of votes.

1903 Australian federal election: Senate, Victoria
Party	Candidate	Votes	%	±%
Independent Labour	William Trenwith (Note: William Trenwith, was a former trade union official and leader of the Victorian Labour Party who was an independent because of his refusal to pledge to vote as directed by the Labour Party.) (elected 1)	102,382	33.4	
Protectionist	Robert Best (re-elected 2)	97,693	31.9	
Labour	Edward Findley (elected 3)	88,614	28.9	
Protectionist	James Styles (re-elected 4)	85,287	27.8	
Free Trade	Sir John McIntyre	84,699	27.6	
Free Trade	Frederick Derham	81,912	26.7	
Labour	Robert Solly	80,593	26.3	
Labour	Stephen Barker	76,039	24.8	
Free Trade	John Templeton	74,062	24.2	
Labour	John Lemmon	73,245	23.9	
Free Trade	Edmund Smith	71,875	23.5	
Protectionist	John Dow	68,123	22.2	
Protectionist	John Barrett (defeated)	64,346	21.0	
Ind. Protectionist	William McCulloch	58,284	19.0	
Ind. Protectionist	Vida Goldstein	51,497	16.8	
Ind. Protectionist	Sir Bryan O'Loghlen	27,160	8.9	
Ind. Protectionist	George Wise	21,056	6.9	
Ind. Free Trade	Henry Williams	19,061	6.2	
Total formal votes		1,225,928; 306,482 voters	97.8	
Informal votes		7,003	2.2	
Turnout		313,485	51.2	
Party total votes
Labour		318,491	26.0	
Protectionist		315,449	25.7	
Free Trade		312,548	25.5	
Ind. Protectionist		157,997	12.9	
Independent Labour		102,382	8.4	
Ind. Free Trade		19,061	1.6	

== Western Australia ==
Each elector voted for up to three candidates. Percentages refer to the number of voters rather than the number of votes.

1903 Australian federal election: Senate, Western Australia
Party	Candidate	Votes	%	±%
Labour	Hugh de Largie (re-elected 1)	19,644	63.1	
Labour	George Henderson (elected 2)	18,414	59.1	
Labour	John Croft (elected 3)	17,464	56.1	
Free Trade	Henry Saunders (defeated)	9,979	32.0	
Protectionist	Michael Cavanagh	8,892	28.5	
Free Trade	William Martin	7,109	22.8	
Free Trade	Herbert Preston	6,126	19.7	
Protectionist	Samuel Moore	5,818	18.7	
Total formal votes		93,446; ~31,000 voters	≈98	
Informal votes		2,001	≈2	
Turnout		≈33000	≈27	
Party total votes
Labour		55,522	59.4	
Free Trade		23,214	24.8	
Protectionist		14,710	15.7	

== See also ==
- Candidates of the 1903 Australian federal election
- Results of the 1903 Australian federal election (House of Representatives)
- Members of the Australian Senate, 1904–1906
