= Culpin =

Culpin is a surname, and may refer to:

- Ewart Culpin (1877–1946), British politician and town planner
- Jack Culpin (born 1927), Australian politician
- Millais Culpin (1874–1952), British psychologist
- Millice Culpin (1846–1941), Australian politician
- Paul Culpin (born 1962), English footballer
