= Mayor Shaw =

Mayor Shaw may refer to:

- Clay Shaw, mayor of Fort Lauderdale, Florida
- Frank L. Shaw, mayor of Los Angeles, California
- James Shaw, mayor of Adelaide, South Australia
- Jim Shaw (South Dakota politician), mayor of Rapid City, South Dakota
- John Shaw, mayor of Toronto, Ontario
- William Shaw, mayor of Dolton, Illinois
