= 1903 Australian federal election =

Election for the 2nd Parliament of Australia

- 16 December 1903

All 75 seats in the House of Representatives 38 seats were needed for a majority in the House 19 (of the 36) seats in the Senate
- Registered: 1,893,586 ▲93.62%
- Turnout: 739,402 (39.05%) (Note: Turnout in contested seats was 50.27%.) (▼12.34 pp)
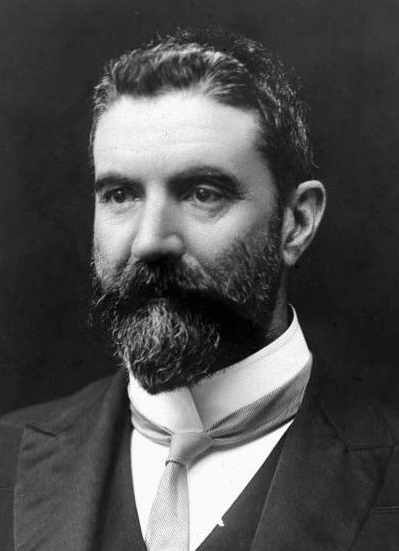

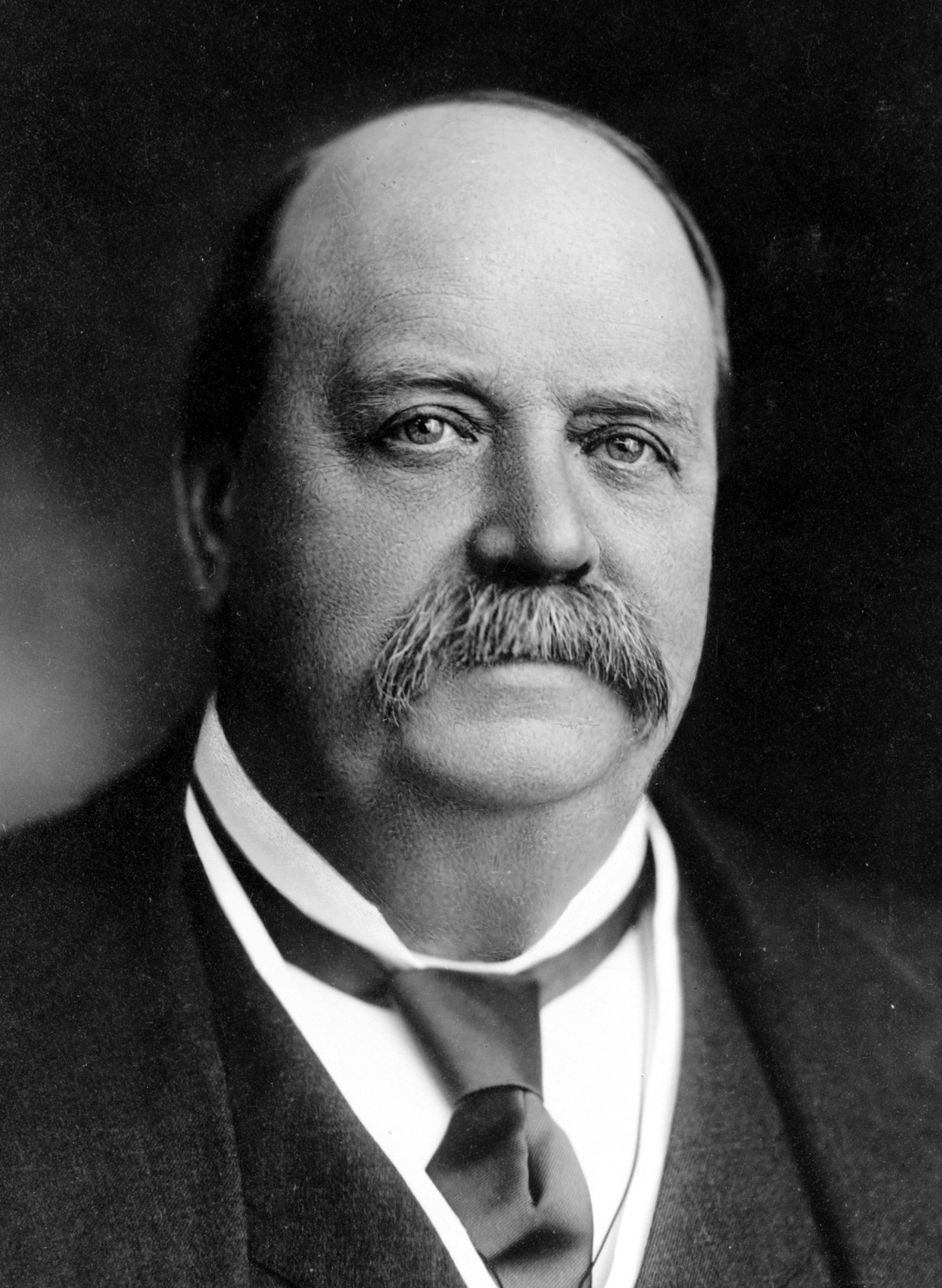

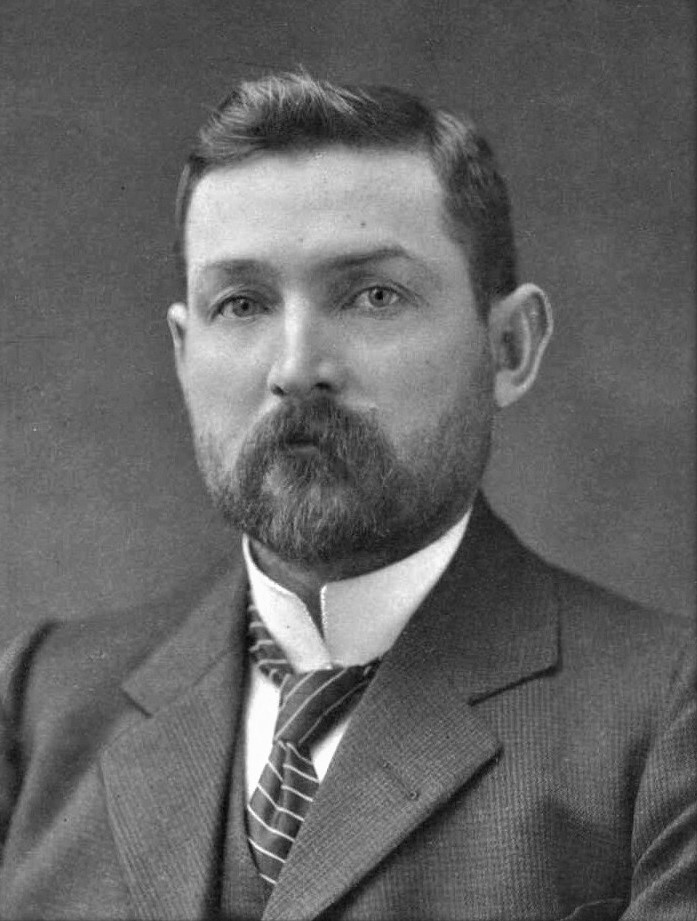

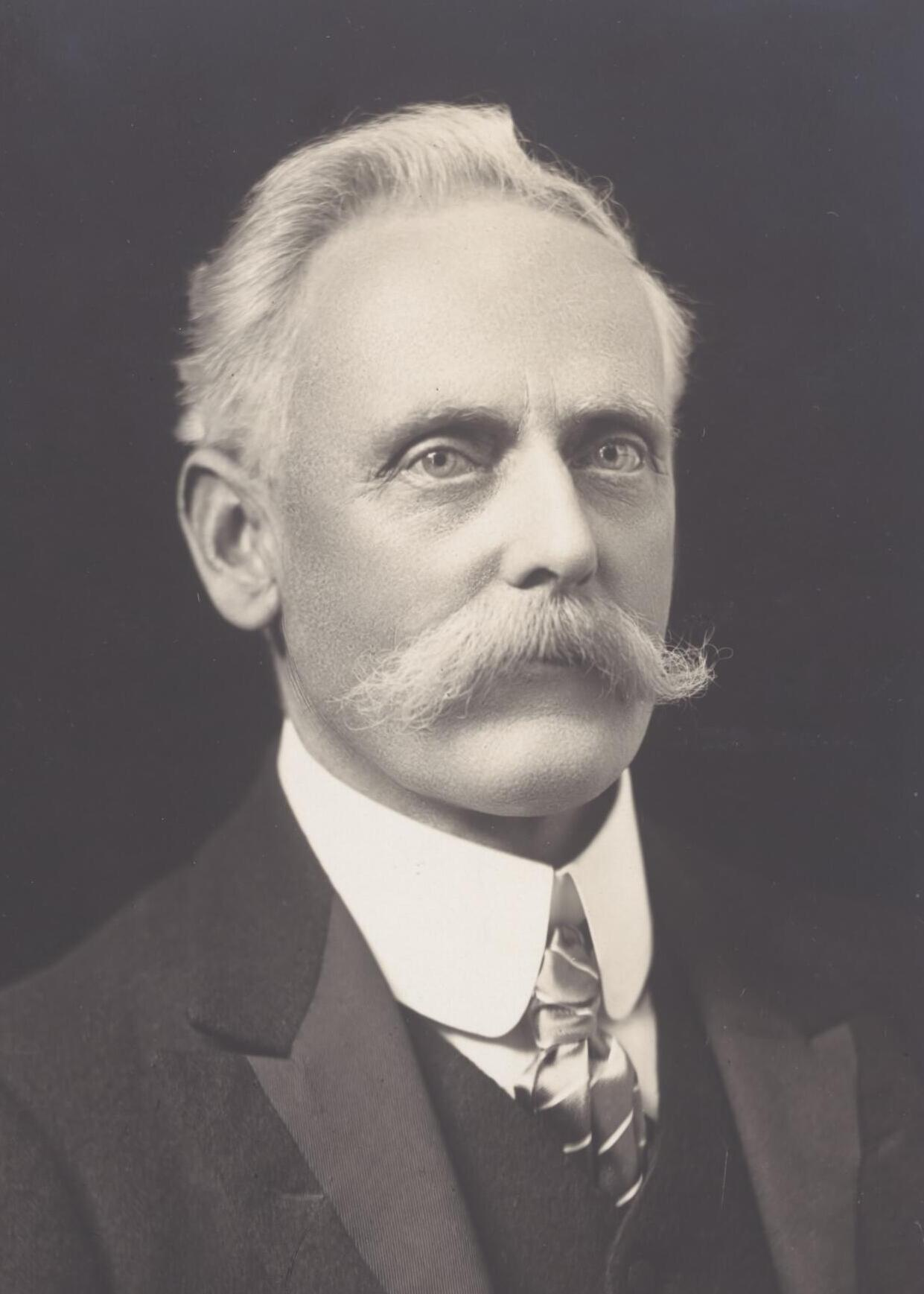
	First party	Second party
Leader	Alfred Deakin	George Reid
Party	Protectionist	Free Trade
Leader since	24 September 1903	11 May 1901
Leader's seat	Ballaarat (Vic.)	East Sydney (NSW)
Last election	32 seats	25 seats
Seats won	26 seats (Note: The total numbers include those elected into the minor affiliate party the National Liberal Union.)	24 seats
Seat change	▼6	▼1
Popular vote	210,738	228,721
Percentage	29.23%	31.73%
Swing	▲1.71%	▼1.48%
	Third party	Fourth party
Leader	Chris Watson	William McWilliams
Party	Labour	Revenue Tariff
Leader since	20 May 1901	1903
Leader's seat	Bland (NSW)	Franklin (Tas.)
Last election	16 seats	New party
Seats won	22 seats	1 seat
Seat change	▲6	▲1
Popular vote	214,713	3,546
Percentage	29.78%	0.49%
Swing	▲11.53%	▲0.49%
	Fifth party
	IND
Leader	N/A
Party	Independents/Other (Note: The independents were James Wilkinson (Moreton, Qld) who was elected as an independent labour candidate and joined the Labour caucus in 1904, and Frederick Holder (Wakefield, SA).)
Leader since	N/A
Leader's seat	N/A
Last election	2 seats
Seats won	2
Seat change	2
Popular vote	63,218
Percentage	8.77%
Swing	▼12.24
- Results by division for the House of Representatives, shaded by winning party's margin of victory.
Prime Minister before election
Alfred Deakin
Protectionist
Subsequent Prime Minister
Alfred Deakin
Protectionist

The 1903 Australian federal election was held in Australia on 16 December 1903. All 75 seats in the House of Representatives, and 19 of the 36 seats in the Senate were up for election. The incumbent Protectionist Party minority government led by Prime Minister Alfred Deakin retained the most House of Representatives seats of the three parties and retained government with the parliamentary support of the Labour Party led by Chris Watson. The Free Trade Party led by George Reid remained in opposition.

The election outcome saw a finely balanced House of Representatives, with the three parties each holding around a third of seats − the Protectionists on 26, the Free Traders on 24 and Labour on 22. This term of parliament saw no changes in any party leadership but did see very significant and prolonged debates, with three changes in government: the Protectionist minority government fell in April 1904 to be replaced by a minority Labour government, which lasted until August 1904, before falling in turn. Labour was replaced by a minority Free Trader government, which finally fell in July 1905 to be replaced by the Protectionists, who continued until the 1906 election and beyond. The Free Traders remained in opposition throughout this eventful period with the exception of Labour forming the opposition for the first time during the period of the Free Trader minority government. Additionally, the Watson government was the world's first Labour Party government at a national level.

Despite a break in prime ministerships in 1904-1905 and 1908–1909, this is the first of three consecutive elections in which Deakin was the sitting prime minister.

== Issues ==
The wreck of SS Petriana outside Port Phillip Bay in late November prompted the government's handling of the White Australia policy to become a campaign issue. Shipwrecked Asian sailors were denied entry to Australia and forced to stay on a crowded tugboat for several days, leading The Argus, Daily Telegraph and The Sydney Morning Herald to accuse the government of cruelty and harming Australia's international reputation. The Age and The Bulletin sided with the government. The issue was "constantly raised" at election meetings, particularly in Victoria and Tasmania.

== Results ==
Protectionist : 24 seats Labour: 22 seats Free Trade: 24 seats Independent: 2 seats National Liberal Union : 2 seats Revenue Tariff Party: 1 seat

=== House of Representatives ===
1903 Australian federal election: House of Representatives (Non-CV)
Party	Votes	%	Swing	Seats	Change
Free Trade	228,721	31.73	−1.48	24	▼1
Labour	214,713	29.78	+11.53	22	▲6
Protectionist	166,176	23.05	−4.47	24	▼8
National Liberal Union	44,562	6.18	+6.18	2	▲2
Revenue Tariff	3,546	0.49	+0.49	1	▲1
Independents/Other (Note: The independents were James Wilkinson (Moreton, Qld) who was elected as an independent labour candidate and joined the Labour caucus in 1904, and Frederick Holder (Wakefield, SA).)	63,218	8.77	−12.24	2	Steady
Formal votes	720,936	97.50			
Informal votes	18,466	2.50			
Total			75 (Note: Seventeen members were elected unopposed – ten Protectionist, four Free Trade, two Labour and one National Liberal Union.)		
Registered voters / turnout	1,893,586	39.05	−12.34		

Popular vote
Free Trade	31.73%
Labour	29.78%
Protectionist	23.05%
National Liberal Union	6.18%
Revenue Tariff	0.49%
Independent	8.77%

Parliament seats
Protectionist	34.67%
Free Trade	32.00%
Labour	29.33%
Revenue Tariff	1.33%
Others	2.67%

=== Senate ===
1903 Australian federal election: Senate 19 elected. (FPTP Block voting, each state elected three except Victoria which elected four)
Party	Votes	%	±	Seats		
Party	Votes	%	±	Seats won	Seats after	Seat change
Free Trade	986,030	34.33	−5.11	4	12	▼3
Labour	784,859	27.33	+13.83	10	14	▲4
Protectionist	503,586	17.53	−27.33	3	8	▼3
National Liberal Union	136,727	4.76	+4.76	0	0	Steady
Socialist Labor	69,769	2.43	+1.41	0	0	Steady
Revenue Tariff	25,310	0.88	+0.88	1	1	▲1
Independent	365,851	12.74	−8.60	1	1	▲1
Formal votes	2,872,132					
Total						
Registered voters / turnout	1,893,586	46.86				

== Significance ==
The election saw the Labour party make significant gains outside New South Wales and Victoria.

As a result of Labour's gains, the numbers of the three parties in Parliament were very close to equal, leading to unstable governments: Alfred Deakin would describe it as a parliament of "three elevens" (three cricket teams). Although the Protectionists were able to retain their minority government with the qualified support of the Labour Party, the equal numbers would see a record three changes of government over the course of the Parliamentary term, with each of the three parties holding office at least once during the term of the Parliament.

The three parties that contested the 1901 election also contested the 1903 election, with only the Protectionists changing leaders: Alfred Deakin was chosen as a result of Edmund Barton's appointment as an inaugural judge of the newly constituted High Court of Australia. The Free Trade Party was again led by George Reid, with the only significant difference in policy between the parties on trade issues: the Protectionists sought to protect Australian industry and agriculture by placing tariffs on imports.

The Free Traders downgraded the view they had last election of having no tariffs to campaigning on minimal tariffs, while the other major party contesting the election was the Labour Party.

This election also saw a minor party, the Tasmanian Revenue Tariff Party, gain an MHR and one Senator. Prior to the 1901 election, the Free Trade Party had been known as the Revenue Tariff Party in some states. However, in 1903 a separate Revenue Tariff Party competed against the FTP in Tasmania. Nevertheless, both of the Revenue Tariff Party members elected joined the Free Trade Party, when the new parliament began sitting.

Like the 1901 election, voting was voluntary and candidates were elected by the first-past-the-post system. The Commonwealth Franchise Act 1902 gave women the vote and the right to stand for federal Parliament, leading to a significant increase in the number of votes cast in the 1903 federal election. Four women stood at the 1903 election – Selina Anderson (Dalley) in the House of Representatives and Vida Goldstein (Victoria), Nellie Martel (New South Wales), and Mary Moore-Bentley (New South Wales) in the Senate. All four stood as independents and all were unsuccessful.

== Electorates ==
Candidates were contesting all 75 House of Representatives and 19 of the 36 Senate seats, a number unchanged from the 1901 election. The House of Representative seats were determined by the population of each state, giving 26 seats to New South Wales, 23 to Victoria, nine to Queensland, seven to South Australia and five to both Western Australia and Tasmania. In 1901, the South Australian and Tasmanian colonial parliaments had not legislated for single member electorates, so their House of Representative members were elected from a single statewide electorate. This had since changed and there were now single member electorates in both states. The newly created seats were Adelaide, Angas, Barker, Boothby, Grey, Hindmarsh and Wakefield (South Australia) and Bass, Darwin, Denison, Franklin and Wilmot (Tasmania).

Each state elected six Senators regardless of population. The Senate was elected by bloc voting rather than the current single transferable vote system. Half the Senators retired as their terms expired, and there was one casual vacancy.

=== Seats changing hands ===
Seat	Pre-1903			Swing	Post-1903		
Seat	Party	Member	Margin	Swing	Margin	Member	Party
Adelaide, SA	new division				100.0	Charles Kingston	Protectionist
Angas, SA	new division				100.0	Paddy Glynn	Free Trade
Barker, SA	new division				100.0	Langdon Bonython	Protectionist
Bass, Tas	new division				6.7	David Storrer	Protectionist
Boothby, SA	new division				100.0	Lee Batchelor	Labour
Brisbane, Qld	Protectionist	Thomas Macdonald-Paterson	7.6	9.7	2.1	Millice Culpin	Labour
Capricornia, Qld	Independent	Alexander Paterson	1.0	8.6	9.6	David Thomson	Labour
Corangamite, VIC	Protectionist	Chester Manifold	22.2	35.2	2.2	Gratton Wilson	Free Trade
Cowper, NSW	Protectionist	Francis Clarke	2.4	15.4	13.0	Henry Lee	Free Trade
Darwin, Tas	new division				0.7	King O'Malley	Labour
Denison, Tas	new division				0.2	Philip Fysh	Protectionist
Franklin, Tas	new division				4.6	William McWilliams	Revenue Tariff
Fremantle, WA	Free Trade	Elias Solomon	10.3	21.6	11.3	William Carpenter	Labour
Grey, SA	new division				100.0	Alexander Poynton	Labour
Gwydir, NSW	Protectionist	George Cruickshank	12,9	24.3	11.4	William Webster	Labour
Hindmarsh, SA	new division				16.7	James Hutchison	Labour
Hunter, NSW	Protectionist	Edmund Barton	100.0	59.3	13.3	Frank Liddell	Free Trade
Kalgoorlie, WA	Free Trade	John Kirwan	14.1	30.7	26.6	Charlie Frazer	Labour
New England, NSW	Protectionist	William Sawers	0.6	2.5	1.9	Edmund Lonsdale	Free Trade
Riverina, NSW	Protectionist	John Chanter	3.5	3.5	0.0	Robert Blackwood	Free Trade
Wakefield, SA	new division				100.0	Frederick Holder	Independent
Wilmot, Tas	new division				4.9	Edward Braddon	Free Trade

- Members listed in italics did not contest their seat at this election.

=== Post-election pendulum ===
Government seats
Protectionist/Labour Coalition
Marginal
Denison (Tas)	Philip Fysh	PROT	00.2 vs FT
Melbourne (Vic)	Malcolm McEacharn	PROT	00.2 vs LAB
Darwin (Tas)	King O'Malley	LAB	00.7 vs PROT
Wimmera (Vic)	Pharez Phillips	PROT	01.0 vs FT
Bendigo (Vic)	John Quick	PROT	01.1 vs LAB
Bourke (Vic)	James Hume Cook	PROT	01.8 vs LAB
Brisbane (Qld)	Millice Culpin	LAB	02.1 vs PROT
S. Melbourne (Vic)	James Ronald	LAB	02.1 vs IND
Oxley (Qld)	Richard Edwards	PROT	02.3 vs LAB
Moira (Vic)	Thomas Kennedy	PROT	04.0 vs FT
Corio (Vic)	Richard Crouch	PROT	04.4 vs FT
Boothby (SA)	Lee Batchelor	LAB	04.6 vs FT
Bland (NSW)	Chris Watson	LAB	05.4 vs FT
Fairly safe
Bass (Tas)	David Storrer	PROT	06.7 vs FT
Melbourne Ports (Vic)	Samuel Mauger	PROT	06.8 vs LAB
Herbert (Qld)	Fred Bamford	LAB	07.8 vs PROT
Darling (NSW)	William Spence	LAB	08.2 vs FT
Capricornia (Qld)	David Thomson	LAB	09.6 vs PROT
Safe
Hume (NSW)	William Lyne	PROT	10.0 vs FT
Wide Bay (Qld)	Andrew Fisher	LAB	11.2 vs PROT
Fremantle (WA)	William Carpenter	LAB	11.3 vs FT
Gwydir (NSW)	William Webster	LAB	11.4 vs FT
Mernda (Vic)	Robert Harper	PROT	12.1 vs FT
Newcastle (NSW)	David Watkins	LAB	12.5 vs FT
Echuca (Vic)	James McColl	PROT	13.3 vs FT
Kalgoorlie (WA)	Charlie Frazer	LAB	16.6 vs FT
Hindmarsh (SA)	James Hutchison	LAB	16.7 vs PROT
Kennedy (Qld)	Charles McDonald	LAB	19.7 vs PROT
Yarra (Vic)	Frank Tudor	LAB	19.7 vs PROT
West Sydney (NSW)	Billy Hughes	LAB	19.9 vs FT
Very safe
N. Melbourne (Vic)	H. B. Higgins	PROT	20.3 vs LAB
Richmond (NSW)	Thomas Ewing	PROT	22.6 vs FT
Perth (WA)	James Fowler	LAB	22.8 vs FT
Laanecoorie (Vic)	Carty Salmon	PROT	24.6 vs FT
Maranoa (Qld)	Jim Page	LAB	25.0 vs PROT
Barrier (NSW)	Josiah Thomas	LAB	32.0 vs IND
Adelaide (SA)	Charles Kingston	PROT	unopposed
Balaclava (Vic)	George Turner	PROT	unopposed
Ballaarat (Vic)	Alfred Deakin	PROT	unopposed
Barker (SA)	Langdon Bonython	PROT	unopposed
Canobolas (NSW)	Thomas Brown	LAB	unopposed
Coolgardie (WA)	Hugh Mahon	LAB	unopposed
Corinella (Vic)	James McCay	PROT	unopposed
Darling Downs (Qld)	Littleton Groom	PROT	unopposed
Eden-Monaro (NSW)	Austin Chapman	PROT	unopposed
Gippsland (Vic)	Allan McLean	PROT	unopposed
Grey (SA)	Alexander Poynton	LAB	unopposed
Indi (Vic)	Isaac Isaacs	PROT	unopposed
Swan (WA)	John Forrest	PROT	unopposed

Non-government seats
Free Trade Party
Marginal
Riverina (NSW)	Robert Blackwood	FT	00.0 vs PROT
New England (NSW)	Edmund Lonsdale	FT	01.9 vs PROT
Corangamite (Vic)	Gratton Wilson	FT	02.2 vs PROT
Grampians (Vic)	Thomas Skene	FT	02.6 vs PROT
Kooyong (Vic)	William Knox	FT	02.8 vs PROT
Wannon (Vic)	Arthur Robinson	FT	02.9 vs PROT
Macquarie (NSW)	Sydney Smith	FT	04.0 vs PROT
Flinders (Vic)	James Gibb	FT	04.5 vs PROT
Wilmot (Tas)	Edward Braddon	FT	04.9 vs PROT
Fairly safe
South Sydney (NSW)	George Edwards	FT	06.0 vs LAB
Safe
Lang (NSW)	Elliot Johnson	FT	12.0 vs IND
Cowper (NSW)	Henry Lee	FT	13.0 vs PROT
Hunter (NSW)	Frank Liddell	FT	13.3 vs IND
Robertson (NSW)	Henry Willis	FT	13.5 vs IND
East Sydney (NSW)	George Reid	FT	14.4 vs LAB
Werriwa (NSW)	Alfred Conroy	FT	18.7 vs LAB
Very safe
Wentworth (NSW)	Willie Kelly	FT	21.8 vs PROT
Parkes (NSW)	Bruce Smith	FT	27.8 vs PROT
Dalley (NSW)	William Wilks	FT	28.6 vs IND
Parramatta (NSW)	Joseph Cook	FT	30.1 vs IND
Angas (SA)	Paddy Glynn	FT	unopposed
Illawarra (NSW)	George Fuller	FT	unopposed
North Sydney (NSW)	Dugald Thomson	FT	unopposed
Others
Franklin (Tas)	William McWilliams	REV TAR	04.6 vs FT
Moreton (Qld)	James Wilkinson	IND LAB	05.8 vs PROT
Wakefield (SA)	Frederick Holder	IND SPEAKER	unopposed

== See also ==
- Candidates of the Australian federal election, 1903
- Members of the Australian House of Representatives, 1903–1906
- Members of the Australian Senate, 1904–1906
- First Deakin Government
