= Thomas Roseby =

Australian judge (1867–1929)

Thomas Ernest Roseby (1867–1929) was an Australian judge.

He was the son of Samuel Roseby and grew up in Sydney. He graduated with a Master of Arts from the University of Sydney in 1901 with honours in French and German, and was senior clerk at the Mint from 1885 to 1896, when he was called to the Bar. After practising as a barrister and as Crown Prosecutor for a number of years, in 1908 he was appointed as a judge of the Condominium Court in the New Hebrides. In 1917 he was appointed Chief Judge of the Supreme Court of Mauritius. He died in 1929 after falling onto the railway tracks at Floréal station.
