= John Croft (Australian politician) =

Australian politician

John William Croft
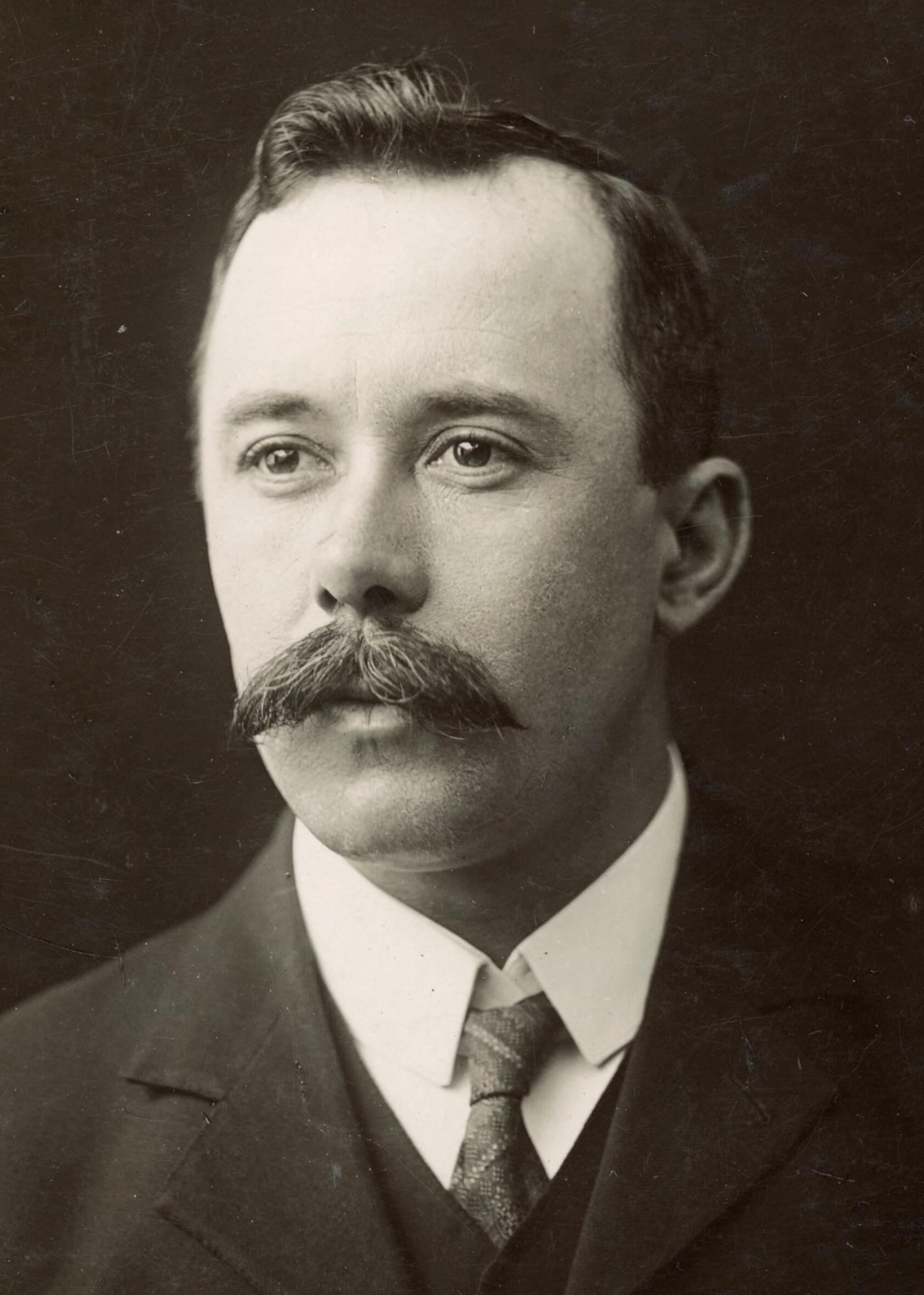

Senator for Western Australia
- In office 1 January 1904 – 30 June 1910

Personal details
- Born: 20 January 1871 Newcastle, New South Wales
- Died: 1913 (aged 41–42)
- Party: Australian Labor Party
- Occupation: Bootmaker

John William Croft (20 January 1871 – c. 1913) was an Australian politician. Born in Newcastle, New South Wales, he was educated in state schools before becoming an apprentice bootmaker. Moving to Western Australia in the 1890s, he was Secretary of the Coastal Trades and Labour Council. In 1903, he was elected to the Australian Senate as a Labor Senator for Western Australia. He retired in 1910.

The circumstances surrounding Croft's death are unclear, and no death certificate registered for him has been located in Australia. Members of his family have variously recorded that he disappeared after heading off on a mysterious "mission" to Uruguay in 1913, but that he attended his mother's funeral in 1925 and was not listed as deceased on his father's 1929 death certificate. Another theory was that Croft committed suicide and this was covered up.
