= Harry Foran =

Australian journalist

- Born: Martin Henry Foran c. 1850; Kilkee, County Clare
- Died: 25 April 1908; Fitzroy, Victoria

Martin Henry "Harry" Foran (c. 1850 – 25 April 1908) was an Australian schoolteacher and journalist.

Foran was born near Kilkee in County Clare to James Forhen, head of a fishing family. After considering the priesthood Foran became a student teacher in 1871, but legal trouble associated with his involvement in tenant reform and the campaign for home rule led him to migrate to Victoria in 1876. He returned to teaching, and again became known as a troublemaker; his licence was withheld until 1885 in an attempt to be rid of him. He was suspended on charges of disciplinary and sexual misconduct in 1888; although he was cleared, the case was reopened in April 1889 and he was dismissed, losing a subsequent appeal to the Supreme Court. The case attracted significant media attention and Foran became something of a celebrity.

Relocating to Sydney in 1893, Foran worked as a journalist and a regular speaker in the Domain. Appealing mainly to the Catholic working class, he became associated with the radical wing of the Protectionist Party, opposing the Labour Leagues on the grounds of "atheistic socialism, opportunism and Protestant bigotry". He edited Sydney Irish World from 1894 to 1895 and ran for the New South Wales Parliament in 1894, 1895, 1898 and 1901 as an independent, without success; he came second to Premier George Reid running for the first federal election in East Sydney. During this time he earned the nicknames the "Domain Demosthenes" and "the Mayor of Hyde Park".

In 1902, he returned to Melbourne and continued his activities on Yarra Bank, running for Melbourne Ports in 1903. Despite his early opposition he joined the Labor Party in 1904; he contributed occasionally to the Catholic weekly the Tribune and was clearly associated with the Labor Party's Catholic wing. His health, however, began to fail and he died almost penniless at St Vincent's Hospital in Fitzroy of jaundice and hydatids. He was remembered variously as a "political failure", a "knight of the Southern Cross" and "probably the most fluent public speaker in Australia".
