= National Liberal Union =

- Abbreviation: NLU
- Founded: August 1901
- Dissolved: 1909
- Preceded by: Queensland Political Association
- Succeeded by: Liberal Party
- Ideology: Protectionism; Liberalism
- National affiliation: Protectionist Party

The National Liberal Union of Queensland, also referred to simply as the Liberals, was an Australian protectionist organisation that was active in the early 1900s. It endorsed candidates at elections and provided extra-parliamentary support for anti-Labour politics.

== History ==
The NLU was formed in August 1901, as a successor to the Queensland Political Association.

In 1902, Protectionist Party leader Alfred Deakin said in a letter to The Morning Post, a London newspaper, that "Ministerial forces were best under control" in southern Queensland through the NLU.

As the Protectionists were not active in Queensland at the time, the NLU endorsed candidates in the House of Representatives and Senate for the 1903 federal election. Two NLU MPs were elected, but none of the organisation's three senate candidates were successful.

The NLU remained active for a number of years, although they were largely replaced by the Anti-Socialist Party at the 1906 federal election. The only Protectionist candidate in Queensland was Darling Downs MP Littleton Groom, however by that time he did not appear to be linked to the NLU anymore.

Herbert Beaumont Marks served as the party's secretary for its Townsville branch in 1909. The NLU faded away around that time, which is when the Liberal Party was formed out of a 'fusion' of the Protectionists and Anti-Socialists.
