= William Grasby =

Australian educationist (1859–1930)

William Catton Grasby (2 October 1859 – 26 October 1930) was an Australian agricultural journalist and educationist.

Grasby was born at Balhannah in the Colony of South Australia to Yorkshire-born farmer William Grasby and Frances, née Catton. He was educated at home, and from the age of thirteen was a pupil-teacher. He travelled to Europe in 1881 and returned to Australia to teach in primary schools. He found the Payneham Boys' Field Club in 1887 and advocated reform in educational policies in South Australia. In 1891, he published Teaching in Three Continents, the result of two years' study of education in North America, Great Britain and Europe. He summarised his proposals in Our Public Schools, a polemic that advocated kindergartens, practical education, abolition of school fees, results-based wages for teachers and extended educational training. He edited the Educator (1893–94) for the duration of its publication.

In 1892, he was appointed director of agronomy and manual training at Way College in Unley. From 1894, he had taught at Roseworthy Agricultural College and was a member of the Central Bureau of Agriculture. He married Tasmanian Quaker Hannah Propsting on 13 October 1896. In 1897, he returned to teach at Way College and continued his involvement in agricultural circles. He established the journal Australian Garden and Field in 1896, which he edited until 1904. In 1887 and 1890 he had contested elections for the South Australian Parliament; in 1903, he stood for the Senate as an independent without success.

In 1904, Grasby moved to Western Australia, being appointed agricultural editor of the Western Mail and the West Australian and writing highly popular weekly columns. He continued to teach agriculture, holding classes at Perth Technical School and Guildford Grammar School. His 1912 publication Principles of Australian Agriculture was an important textbook, and his strong support for tertiary education for Western Australia led to his appointment to the University of Western Australia's first senate in 1912. In 1911, he was involved in founding the Kindergarten Union. He and Charles Harper together developed the first wheat varieties to be grown exclusively in Western Australia. An early conservationist, he decried the hunting of animals for scientific collections. He retired from public life in 1928 and died at East Guildford in 1930 of diabetes and gangrene.
