= Henry Lee (Australian politician) =

Australian politician (1856–1927)

The Honourable Henry Lee
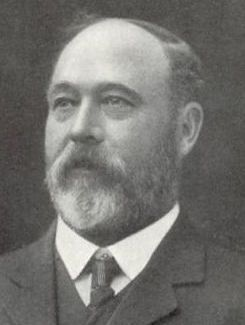

Member of the Australian Parliament for Cowper
- In office 16 December 1903 – 12 December 1906
- Preceded by: Francis Clarke
- Succeeded by: John Thomson

Personal details
- Born: 1856 Gerringong, New South Wales
- Died: 12 August 1927 (aged 70–71)
- Party: Free Trade Party
- Occupation: Dairy farmer

Henry William Lee (1856 – 12 August 1927) was an Australian politician. Born in Gerringong, New South Wales, he was a dairy farmer on the Hunter Region, and became a leader in the dairying industry. In 1903, he was elected to the Australian House of Representatives for the Free Trade Party, emphatically defeating Protectionist Francis Clarke for the seat of Cowper. However, he in turn was defeated in 1906 by Protectionist John Thomson. Lee subsequently became a businessman in Sydney. He died in 1927.

Parliament of Australia
Preceded by Francis Clarke	Member for Cowper; 1903 – 1906	Succeeded by John Thomson
