= Division of Northern Melbourne =

Former Australian federal electoral division

Coordinates: 37°47′57″S 144°56′48″E

Northern Melbourne Australian House of Representatives Division
- Created: 1901
- Abolished: 1906
- Namesake: Northern Melbourne

The Division of Northern Melbourne was an Australian Electoral Division in the state of Victoria. It was located in the inner northern suburbs of Melbourne, and was named accordingly. It included parts of the suburbs of Carlton, North Melbourne and Fitzroy. At the redistribution of 13 July 1906, it was abolished and replaced by the Division of Batman.

The division was held by one member, H. B. Higgins, who was Attorney General from 1904 to 1905. He did not contest Batman at the 1906 election, as he was appointed a Justice of the High Court of Australia in 1906.

== Members ==
Image	Member	Party	Term	Notes
	H. B. Higgins (1851–1929)	Protectionist	30 March 1901 – 12 October 1906	Previously held the Victorian Legislative Assembly seat of Geelong. Served as minister under Watson. Resigned to become a Justice of the High Court
