= James Shaw (mayor) =

Australian politician

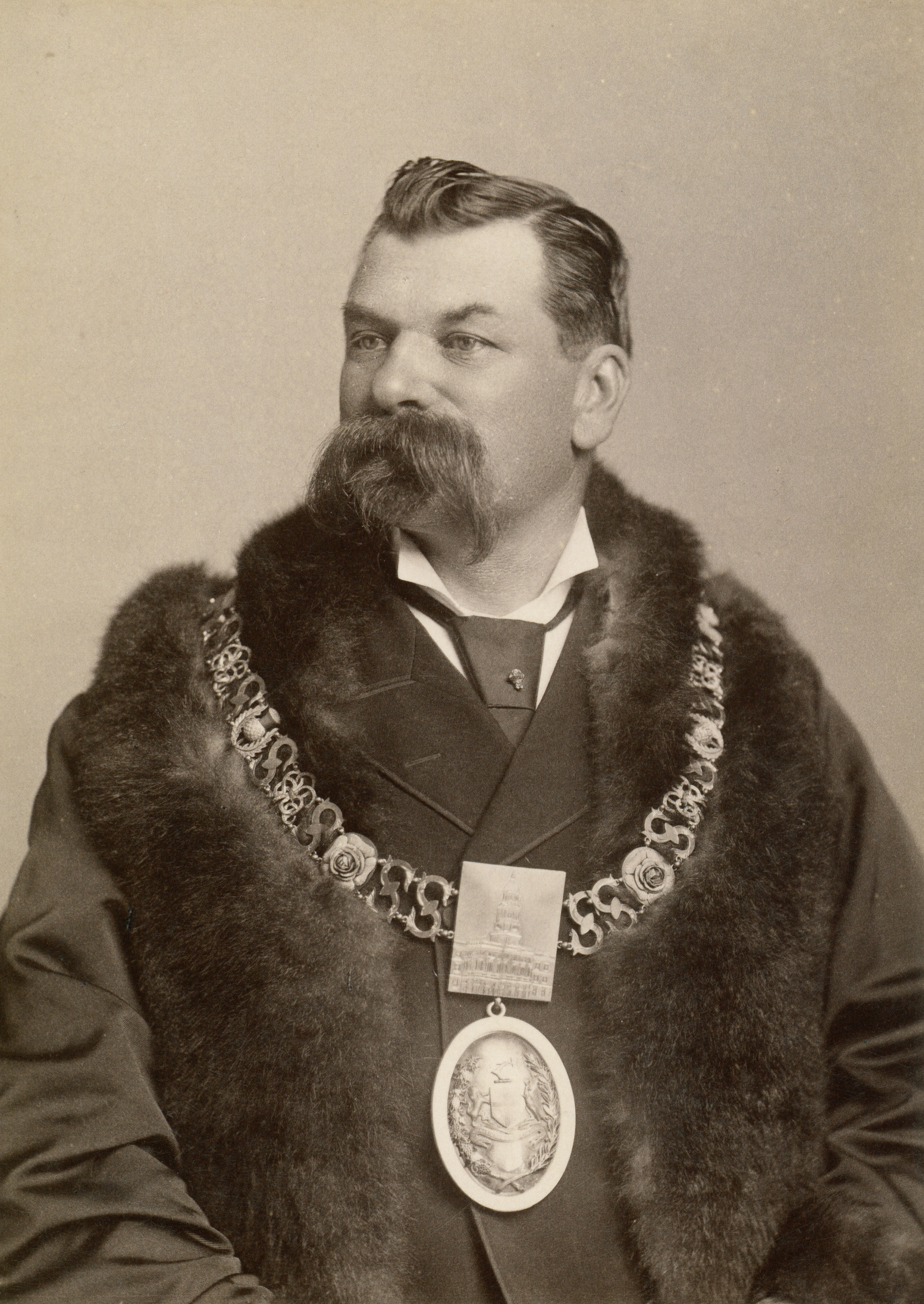
James Shaw ca. 1888–9

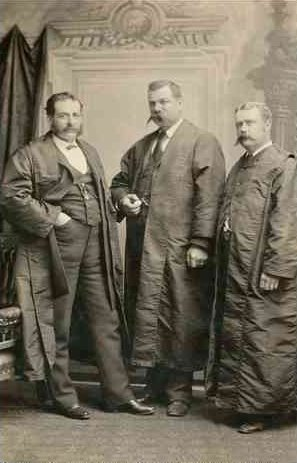
Mayors of Adelaide: Judah Moss Solomon (1869–71); James Shaw (1888–9); Frederick William Bullock (1891–2) ca. 1880

James Shaw (1846–1910) was Mayor of Adelaide from 1888 to 1889.

James Shaw arrived in South Australia in 1864. Builder and contractor; Councillor for the Young Ward.
