= Millice Culpin =

Australian politician (1846–1941)

Dr Millice Culpin
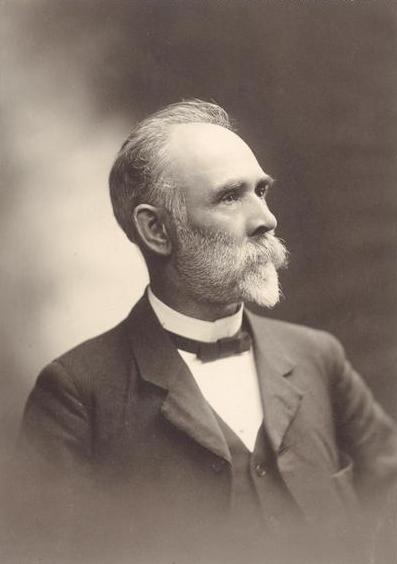

Member of the Australian Parliament for Brisbane
- In office 16 December 1903 – 12 December 1906
- Preceded by: Thomas Macdonald-Paterson
- Succeeded by: Justin Foxton

Personal details
- Born: 1 December 1846 Hertfordshire, England
- Died: 1 September 1941 (aged 94) Brisbane, Queensland, Australia
- Party: Labour Party
- Occupation: Doctor

Millice Culpin (1 December 1846 – 1 September 1941) was an Australian politician. Born in Hertfordshire, England, he was educated at Alleynes Grammar School and then the University of Edinburgh, after which he became a doctor. He migrated to Australia in 1891. In 1903, he was elected to the Australian House of Representatives as the Labor member for Brisbane after the appearance of a second Protectionist candidate William Morse allowed him to defeat sitting member Thomas Macdonald-Paterson. Culpin was defeated in 1906 and became a suburban doctor in Brisbane. He died there in 1941 and was buried in Toowong Cemetery.

Parliament of Australia
Preceded by Thomas Macdonald-Paterson	Member for Brisbane; 1903–1906	Succeeded by Justin Foxton
