= Electoral results for the Division of Riverina =

Australian division election results

This is a list of electoral results for the Division of Riverina in Australian federal elections from the division's creation in 1901 until its abolition in 1984, and from its creation in 1993 until the present.

== Members ==
First incarnation (1901–1984)
Member	Party	Term
John Chanter	Protectionist	1901–1903
Robert Blackwood	Free Trade	1903–1904
John Chanter	Protectionist	1904–1909
John Chanter	Labor	1909–1913
Franc Falkiner	Liberal	1913–1914
John Chanter	Labor	1914–1916
John Chanter	Nationalist	1916–1922
William Killen	Country	1922–1931
Horace Nock	Country	1931–1940
Joe Langtry	Labor	1940–1949
Hugh Roberton	Country	1949–1965
Bill Armstrong	Country	1965–1969
Al Grassby	Labor	1969–1974
John Sullivan	Country	1974–1977
John FitzPatrick	Labor	1977–1980
Noel Hicks	National	1980–1984
Second incarnation (1993–present)
Member	Party	Term
Noel Hicks	National	1993–1998
Kay Hull	National	1998–2010
Michael McCormack	National	2010–present

== Election results ==
=== Elections in the 2020s ===
==== 2025 ====
2025 Australian federal election: Riverina
Party	Candidate	Votes	%	±%
National	Michael McCormack	42,678	40.32	+5.93
Labor	Mark Jeffreson	19,506	18.43	−6.50
One Nation	Mark Craig	10,427	9.85	+2.50
Independent	Jenny Rolfe	6,909	6.53	+6.53
Independent	James Gooden	5,080	4.80	+4.80
Greens	Pheonix Valxori	4,767	4.50	−2.24
Shooters, Fishers, Farmers	Desiree Gregory	4,217	3.98	−0.09
Libertarian	Christine Onley	2,338	2.21	−3.53
Citizens	Richard Foley	2,233	2.11	+2.11
Family First	Mark Burge	2,151	2.03	+2.03
Independent	Grant Hardwick	1,861	1.76	+1.76
Independent	Barbara Baikie	1,858	1.76	+1.76
Independent	Jake Davis	1,812	1.71	+1.71
Total formal votes		105,837	88.73	−4.21
Informal votes		13,443	11.27	+4.21
Turnout		119,280	92.80	+1.11
Two-party-preferred result
National	Michael McCormack	66,276	62.62	+2.91
Labor	Mark Jeffreson	39,561	37.38	−2.91
National hold		Swing	+2.91	

==== 2022 ====
2022 Australian federal election: Riverina
Party	Candidate	Votes	%	±%
National	Michael McCormack	45,951	46.57	−13.36
Labor	Mark Jeffreson	20,193	20.47	−2.69
One Nation	Richard Orchard	8,042	8.15	+8.15
Liberal Democrats	Dean McCrae	6,563	6.65	+6.65
Greens	Michael Organ	6,349	6.43	+0.23
Shooters, Fishers, Farmers	Steve Karaitiana	6,280	6.37	+6.37
Independent	Darren Ciavarella	2,701	2.74	+2.74
United Australia	Daniel Martelozzo	2,585	2.62	−8.09
Total formal votes		98,664	92.68	−2.16
Informal votes		7,794	7.32	+2.16
Turnout		106,458	91.75	−1.64
Two-party-preferred result
National	Michael McCormack	63,979	64.85	−4.63
Labor	Mark Jeffreson	34,685	35.15	+4.63
National hold		Swing	−4.63	

Alluvial diagram for preference flows in the seat of Riverina in the 2022 federal election. indicates at what stage the winning candidate had over 50% of the votes and was declared the winner.

=== Elections in the 2010s ===
==== 2019 ====
2019 Australian federal election: Riverina
Party	Candidate	Votes	%	±%
National	Michael McCormack	60,493	59.93	+2.73
Labor	Mark Jeffreson	23,380	23.16	−2.36
United Australia	Richard Foley	10,814	10.71	+10.71
Greens	Michael Bayles	6,254	6.20	+1.71
Total formal votes		100,941	94.84	−0.55
Informal votes		5,489	5.16	+0.55
Turnout		106,430	93.39	−0.02
Two-party-preferred result
National	Michael McCormack	70,136	69.48	+3.04
Labor	Mark Jeffreson	30,805	30.52	−3.04
National hold		Swing	+3.04	

==== 2016 ====
2016 Australian federal election: Riverina
Party	Candidate	Votes	%	±%
National	Michael McCormack	56,581	57.20	+15.43
Labor	Tim Kurylowicz	25,244	25.52	+3.75
Independent	Richard Foley	6,058	6.12	+6.12
Greens	Kevin Poynter	4,444	4.49	+0.83
Family First	Glenn O'Rourke	3,386	3.42	+3.42
Christian Democrats	Philip Langfield	3,207	3.24	+1.52
Total formal votes		98,920	95.39	+1.78
Informal votes		4,784	4.61	−1.78
Turnout		103,704	93.41	−3.15
Two-party-preferred result
National	Michael McCormack	65,719	66.44	−2.55
Labor	Tim Kurylowicz	33,201	33.56	+2.55
National hold		Swing	−2.55	

==== 2013 ====
2013 Australian federal election: Riverina
Party	Candidate	Votes	%	±%
National	Michael McCormack	52,062	59.18	+14.41
Labor	Tim Kurylowicz	17,970	20.43	−1.80
Palmer United	Lex Stewart	4,545	5.17	+5.17
Greens	Ros Prangnell	3,169	3.60	−0.90
Democratic Labour	Paul Funnell	3,137	3.57	+3.57
Bullet Train	Andrew Lamont	2,405	2.73	+2.73
Christian Democrats	Keith Pech	1,314	1.49	+0.13
Australia First	Lorraine Sharp	1,287	1.46	+1.46
Katter's Australian	Norm Dunn	1,044	1.19	+1.19
Rise Up Australia	Kim Heath	1,040	1.18	+1.18
Total formal votes		87,973	93.03	−1.21
Informal votes		6,592	6.97	+1.21
Turnout		94,565	94.46	−0.25
Two-party-preferred result
National	Michael McCormack	62,612	71.17	+3.00
Labor	Tim Kurylowicz	25,361	28.83	−3.00
National hold		Swing	+3.00	

==== 2010 ====
2010 Australian federal election: Riverina
Party	Candidate	Votes	%	±%
National	Michael McCormack	39,389	44.77	−11.60
Labor	Robyn Hakelis	19,559	22.23	−8.30
Liberal	Andrew Negline	14,536	16.52	+12.10
Independent	Matthew Hogg	5,148	5.85	+5.85
Greens	David Fletcher	3,961	4.50	−0.27
Liberal Democrats	Tim Quilty	1,703	1.94	+1.84
One Nation	Craig Hesketh	1,411	1.60	−0.34
Christian Democrats	Sylvia Mulholland	1,201	1.36	+1.21
Family First	Rhonda Lever	1,081	1.23	+1.11
Total formal votes		87,989	94.24	−1.87
Informal votes		5,378	5.76	+1.87
Turnout		93,367	94.70	−1.05
Two-party-preferred result
National	Michael McCormack	59,980	68.17	+3.62
Labor	Robyn Hakelis	28,009	31.83	−3.62
National hold		Swing	+3.62	

=== Elections in the 2000s ===
==== 2007 ====
2007 Australian federal election: Riverina
Party	Candidate	Votes	%	±%
National	Kay Hull	52,779	62.57	−4.47
Labor	Peter Knox	24,471	29.01	+4.48
Greens	Ray Goodlass	4,130	4.90	+0.58
One Nation	Craig Hesketh	1,837	2.18	−1.77
Citizens Electoral Council	Gary Johnson	1,141	1.35	+1.31
Total formal votes		84,358	96.17	−0.01
Informal votes		3,361	3.83	+0.01
Turnout		87,719	96.01	−0.31
Two-party-preferred result
National	Kay Hull	55,868	66.23	−4.62
Labor	Peter Knox	28,490	33.77	+4.62
National hold		Swing	−4.62	

==== 2004 ====
2004 Australian federal election: Riverina
Party	Candidate	Votes	%	±%
National	Kay Hull	54,328	66.83	+5.38
Labor	Victoria Brooks	20,080	24.70	+0.70
Greens	Ray Goodlass	3,497	4.30	+1.87
One Nation	Neil Turner	3,389	4.17	−1.43
Total formal votes		81,294	96.44	+0.40
Informal votes		3,196	3.78	−0.40
Turnout		84,490	95.71	−0.23
Two-party-preferred result
National	Kay Hull	57,440	70.66	+0.79
Labor	Victoria Brooks	23,854	29.34	−0.79
National hold		Swing	+0.79	

==== 2001 ====
2001 Australian federal election: Riverina
Party	Candidate	Votes	%	±%
National	Kay Hull	49,371	61.45	+29.25
Labor	Andrew Albiston	19,285	24.00	−3.38
One Nation	Neil Turner	4,496	5.60	−5.89
Democrats	Rex Graham	2,031	2.53	+0.24
Greens	Catherine Moore	1,954	2.43	+2.22
Independent	Dennis Richter	1,839	2.29	+2.29
Christian Democrats	Russell Dancey	1,371	1.71	+1.71
Total formal votes		80,347	95.84	−1.00
Informal votes		3,488	4.16	+1.00
Turnout		83,835	96.48	
Two-party-preferred result
National	Kay Hull	56,138	69.88	+5.22
Labor	Andrew Albiston	24,209	30.12	−5.22
National hold		Swing	+5.22	

=== Elections in the 1990s ===
==== 1998 ====
1998 Australian federal election: Riverina
Party	Candidate	Votes	%	±%
National	Kay Hull	27,060	36.39	−29.58
Labor	Peter Hargreaves	19,234	25.87	−0.33
Liberal	David Kibbey	15,942	21.44	+21.44
One Nation	David Barton	9,129	12.28	+12.28
Democrats	Rosemary Gillies	1,770	2.38	−1.63
Independent	Denis Collins	1,218	1.64	+1.64
Total formal votes		74,353	97.05	+0.28
Informal votes		2,257	2.95	−0.28
Turnout		76,610	95.91	−1.11
Two-party-preferred result
National	Kay Hull	48,552	65.30	−5.71
Labor	Peter Hargreaves	25,801	34.70	+5.71
National hold		Swing	−5.71	

==== 1996 ====
1996 Australian federal election: Riverina
Party	Candidate	Votes	%	±%
National	Noel Hicks	48,994	65.97	+27.51
Labor	Rob Colligan	19,454	26.20	−7.40
Democrats	John Collins	2,977	4.01	+4.01
Independent	Alistair Jones	2,837	3.82	+3.82
Total formal votes		74,262	96.77	−0.89
Informal votes		2,476	3.23	+0.89
Turnout		76,738	97.02	+0.89
Two-party-preferred result
National	Noel Hicks	52,614	71.01	+8.08
Labor	Rob Colligan	21,484	28.99	−8.08
National hold		Swing	+8.08	

==== 1993 ====
1993 Australian federal election: Riverina
Party	Candidate	Votes	%	±%
National	Noel Hicks	28,177	38.47	+7.67
Labor	Pat Brassil	24,606	33.59	+0.66
Liberal	Bill Heffernan	17,386	23.74	−3.20
Independent	Paul Meredith	2,233	3.05	+3.05
Natural Law	Margaret ter Haar	847	1.16	+1.16
Total formal votes		73,249	97.66	+0.07
Informal votes		1,755	2.34	−0.07
Turnout		75,004	96.13	
Two-party-preferred result
National	Noel Hicks	46,078	62.93	+0.67
Labor	Pat Brassil	27,147	37.07	−0.67
National notional hold		Swing	+0.67	

Division re-created

==== 1984 - 1993 ====
District abolished Division abolished

=== Elections in the 1980s ===
==== 1983 ====
1983 Australian federal election: Riverina
Party	Candidate	Votes	%	±%
National	Noel Hicks	32,976	49.2	+16.1
Labor	Ronald Adams	32,587	48.6	+1.7
Democrats	Lesley Holschier	1,495	2.2	+0.0
Total formal votes		67,058	97.8	
Informal votes		1,495	2.2	
Turnout		68,072	94.7	
Two-party-preferred result
National	Noel Hicks	33,820	50.4	−0.1
Labor	Ronald Adams	33,238	49.6	+0.1
National hold		Swing	−0.1	

==== 1980 ====
1980 Australian federal election: Riverina
Party	Candidate	Votes	%	±%
Labor	Frederick Smith	30,698	46.9	−1.9
National Country	Noel Hicks	21,663	33.1	−15.6
Liberal	Brian Thornton	11,072	16.9	+16.9
Democrats	John Newman	1,414	2.2	+2.2
Independent	Frederick Martin	549	0.8	+0.8
Total formal votes		65,396	97.6	
Informal votes		1,628	2.4	
Turnout		67,024	93.2	
Two-party-preferred result
National Country	Noel Hicks	33,055	50.5	+0.6
Labor	Frederick Smith	32,345	49.5	−0.6
National Country gain from Labor		Swing	+0.6	

=== Elections in the 1970s ===
==== 1977 ====
1977 Australian federal election: Riverina
Party	Candidate	Votes	%	±%
Labor	John FitzPatrick	31,237	48.8	−3.6
National Country	John Sullivan	31,134	48.7	+1.1
Independent	Rodney Lawrence	1,580	2.5	+2.5
Total formal votes		74,962	98.2	
Informal votes		1,159	1.8	
Turnout		65,110	94.4	
Two-party-preferred result
Labor	John FitzPatrick	32,049	50.1	−2.3
National Country	John Sullivan	31,902	49.9	+2.3
Labor notional hold		Swing	−2.3	

==== 1975 ====
1975 Australian federal election: Riverina
Party	Candidate	Votes	%	±%
National Country	John Sullivan	30,851	61.8	+28.6
Labor	John Pollard	19,053	38.2	−9.6
Total formal votes		49,904	98.2	
Informal votes		901	1.8	
Turnout		50,805	95.0	
National Country hold		Swing	+11.0	

==== 1974 ====
1974 Australian federal election: Riverina
Party	Candidate	Votes	%	±%
Labor	Al Grassby	23,233	47.8	−6.9
Country	John Sullivan	16,128	33.2	−2.2
Liberal	Donald Mackay	8,868	18.3	+12.2
Australia	John Thomson	357	0.7	+0.7
Total formal votes		48,586	98.8	
Informal votes		572	1.2	
Turnout		49,158	94.7	
Two-party-preferred result
Country	John Sullivan	24,689	50.8	+7.7
Labor	Al Grassby	23,897	49.2	−7.7
Country gain from Labor		Swing	+7.7	

==== 1972 ====
1972 Australian federal election: Riverina
Party	Candidate	Votes	%	±%
Labor	Al Grassby	24,705	54.7	+3.2
Country	Eric Kronborg	16,003	35.4	−8.9
Liberal	Peter Long	2,753	6.1	+6.1
Democratic Labor	Patrick Barry	1,694	3.8	−0.3
Total formal votes		45,155	98.9	
Informal votes		491	1.1	
Turnout		45,646	94.9	
Two-party-preferred result
Labor	Al Grassby		56.9	+4.6
Country	Eric Kronborg		44.1	−4.6
Labor hold		Swing	+4.6	

=== Elections in the 1960s ===
==== 1969 ====
1969 Australian federal election: Riverina
Party	Candidate	Votes	%	±%
Labor	Al Grassby	22,499	51.5	+18.7
Country	Bill Armstrong	19,351	44.3	−14.8
Democratic Labor	Patrick Barry	1,802	4.1	−4.0
Total formal votes		43,652	98.9	
Informal votes		485	1.1	
Turnout		44,137	95.1	
Two-party-preferred result
Labor	Al Grassby		52.3	+18.8
Country	Bill Armstrong		47.7	−18.8
Labor gain from Country		Swing	+18.8	

==== 1966 ====
1966 Australian federal election: Riverina
Party	Candidate	Votes	%	±%
Country	Bill Armstrong	24,570	59.1	+7.4
Labor	Patrick Newman	9,803	23.6	−8.8
Labor	Arthur Solly	3,851	9.3	+9.3
Democratic Labor	Leslie Kennedy	3,373	8.1	+1.4
Total formal votes		41,597	97.7	
Informal votes		972	2.3	
Turnout		42,569	94.9	
Two-party-preferred result
Country	Bill Armstrong		66.5	+9.2
Labor	Patrick Newman		33.5	−9.2
Country hold		Swing	+9.2	

==== 1965 by-election ====
1965 Riverina by-election
Party	Candidate	Votes	%	±%
Country	Bill Armstrong	21,371	56.3	+4.6
Labor	Jack Ward	16,561	43.7	+2.1
Total formal votes		37,932	98.8	
Informal votes		455	1.2	
Turnout		38,387	87.5	
Country hold		Swing	−1.0	

==== 1963 ====
1963 Australian federal election: Riverina
Party	Candidate	Votes	%	±%
Country	Hugh Roberton	21,068	51.7	+3.9
Labor	Jack Ward	16,969	41.6	−3.1
Democratic Labor	Victor Groutsch	2,733	6.7	−0.9
Total formal votes		40,770	98.8	
Informal votes		506	1.2	
Turnout		41,276	94.7	
Two-party-preferred result
Country	Hugh Roberton		57.3	+3.2
Labor	Jack Ward		42.7	−3.2
Country hold		Swing	+3.2	

==== 1961 ====
1961 Australian federal election: Riverina
Party	Candidate	Votes	%	±%
Country	Hugh Roberton	18,838	47.8	−6.0
Labor	Jack Ward	17,622	44.7	+4.4
Democratic Labor	Albert Elrington	2,988	7.6	+1.6
Total formal votes		39,448	98.2	
Informal votes		714	1.8	
Turnout		40,162	94.9	
Two-party-preferred result
Country	Hugh Roberton	21,331	54.1	−4.5
Labor	Jack Ward	18,117	45.9	+4.5
Country hold		Swing	−4.5	

=== Elections in the 1950s ===
==== 1958 ====
1958 Australian federal election: Riverina
Party	Candidate	Votes	%	±%
Country	Hugh Roberton	20,894	53.8	−5.5
Labor	Jack Ward	15,640	40.3	−0.4
Democratic Labor	Peter Rolfe	2,320	6.0	+6.0
Total formal votes		38,854	97.9	
Informal votes		828	2.1	
Turnout		39,682	94.1	
Two-party-preferred result
Country	Hugh Roberton		58.6	−0.7
Labor	Jack Ward		41.4	+0.7
Country hold		Swing	−0.7	

==== 1955 ====
1955 Australian federal election: Riverina
Party	Candidate	Votes	%	±%
Country	Hugh Roberton	22,347	59.3	+7.1
Labor	Oscar Washington	15,324	40.7	−4.6
Total formal votes		37,671	97.7	
Informal votes		895	2.3	
Turnout		38,566	94.3	
Country hold		Swing	+5.9	

==== 1954 ====
1954 Australian federal election: Riverina
Party	Candidate	Votes	%	±%
Country	Hugh Roberton	20,341	52.2	−1.1
Labor	Michael Sheehan	17,646	45.3	+2.3
Communist	Les Kelton	951	2.4	−1.3
Total formal votes		38,938	99.1	
Informal votes		355	0.9	
Turnout		39,293	95.8	
Two-party-preferred result
Country	Hugh Roberton		53.4	−1.3
Labor	Michael Sheehan		46.6	+1.3
Country hold		Swing	−1.3	

==== 1951 ====
1951 Australian federal election: Riverina
Party	Candidate	Votes	%	±%
Country	Hugh Roberton	19,781	53.3	+0.0
Labor	Michael Sheehan	15,975	43.0	−2.2
Communist	Les Kelton	1,358	3.7	+2.2
Total formal votes		37,114	98.6	
Informal votes		510	1.4	
Turnout		37,624	95.1	
Two-party-preferred result
Country	Hugh Roberton		54.7	+1.2
Labor	Michael Sheehan		45.3	−1.2
Country hold		Swing	+1.2	

=== Elections in the 1940s ===
==== 1949 ====
1949 Australian federal election: Riverina
Party	Candidate	Votes	%	±%
Country	Hugh Roberton	19,904	53.3	+18.0
Labor	Joe Langtry	16,880	45.2	−0.5
Communist	William Mitchell	560	1.5	+1.5
Total formal votes		37,344	98.8	
Informal votes		458	1.2	
Turnout		37,802	96.0	
Two-party-preferred result
Country	Hugh Roberton		53.5	+3.8
Labor	Joe Langtry		46.5	−3.8
Country gain from Labor		Swing	+3.8	

==== 1946 ====
1946 Australian federal election: Riverina
Party	Candidate	Votes	%	±%
Labor	Joe Langtry	19,898	43.5	−11.8
Country	Hugh Roberton	16,284	35.6	+2.9
Liberal	Christopher Lethbridge	7,086	15.5	+15.5
Lang Labor	John Gosling	2,230	4.9	+4.9
Independent	William Pow	246	0.5	+0.5
Total formal votes		45,744	96.4	
Informal votes		1,714	3.6	
Turnout		47,458	92.8	
Two-party-preferred result
Labor	Joe Langtry	23,134	50.6	−12.5
Country	Hugh Roberton	22,610	49.4	+12.5
Labor hold		Swing	−12.5	

==== 1943 ====
1943 Australian federal election: Riverina
Party	Candidate	Votes	%	±%
Labor	Joe Langtry	25,397	55.3	+33.6
Country	Lindsay McIvor	9,427	20.5	−9.4
Country	Russell Scilley	5,613	12.2	+12.2
Independent	Robert Ballantyne	2,992	6.5	+6.5
Independent	Robert McKenzie	1,860	4.1	+4.1
Liberal Democratic	George Simons	489	1.1	+1.1
Independent	Frank Rieck	131	0.3	+0.3
Total formal votes		45,909	94.9	
Informal votes		2,464	5.1	
Turnout		48,373	96.0	
Two-party-preferred result
Labor	Joe Langtry		63.1	+11.5
Country	Lindsay McIvor		46.9	−11.5
Labor hold		Swing	+11.5	

==== 1940 ====
1940 Australian federal election: Riverina
Party	Candidate	Votes	%	±%
Country	Horace Nock	12,355	26.6	−7.3
Labor	Joe Langtry	10,083	21.7	−18.6
Defence Movement	John Hogan	7,571	16.3	+16.3
Country	Hugh Roberton	7,199	15.5	+15.5
Labor (N-C)	William Quirk	6,724	14.5	+14.5
Independent	Ronald Cuttle	1,408	3.0	+3.0
State Labor	Charles Lenon	1,177	2.5	+2.5
Total formal votes		46,517	95.4	
Informal votes		2,261	4.6	
Turnout		48,778	92.6	
Two-party-preferred result
Labor	Joe Langtry	23,980	51.6	+8.8
Country	Horace Nock	22,537	48.4	−8.8
Labor gain from Country		Swing	+8.8	

=== Elections in the 1930s ===
==== 1937 ====
1937 Australian federal election: Riverina
Party	Candidate	Votes	%	±%
Country	Horace Nock	24,756	49.4	−5.6
Labor	William Quirk	20,182	40.3	+27.2
Independent	Robert Ballantyne	5,165	10.3	+10.3
Total formal votes		50,103	98.1	
Informal votes		975	1.9	
Turnout		51,078	95.7	
Two-party-preferred result
Country	Horace Nock	28,661	57.2	−2.1
Labor	William Quirk	21,442	42.8	+2.1
Country hold		Swing	−2.1	

==== 1934 ====
1934 Australian federal election: Riverina
Party	Candidate	Votes	%	±%
Country	Horace Nock	26,719	55.0	−10.5
Labor (NSW)	Edward O'Neill	15,441	31.8	+11.4
Labor	John Cusack	6,379	13.1	−1.0
Total formal votes		48,539	97.7	
Informal votes		1,134	2.3	
Turnout		49,673	94.2	
Two-party-preferred result
Country	Horace Nock		59.3	+8.0
Labor (NSW)	Edward O'Neill		40.7	+40.7
Country hold		Swing	+8.0	

==== 1931 ====
1931 Australian federal election: Riverina
Party	Candidate	Votes	%	±%
Country	Robert Hankinson	14,778	34.3	+11.2
Country	Horace Nock	13,518	31.3	+31.3
Labor (NSW)	John Heiss	8,882	20.6	+20.6
Labor	Louis Levy	5,951	13.8	−31.8
Total formal votes		43,129	95.8	
Informal votes		1,875	4.2	
Turnout		45,004	94.0	
Two-party-preferred result
Country	Horace Nock	22,121	51.3	−3.1
Country	Robert Hankinson	21,008	48.7	+48.7
Country hold		Swing	−3.1	

=== Elections in the 1920s ===
==== 1929 ====
1929 Australian federal election: Riverina
Party	Candidate	Votes	%	±%
Country	William Killen	22,200	51.6	−3.1
Labor	William Nulty	19,606	45.6	+3.1
Country	Horace Nock	1,224	2.8	+2.8
Total formal votes		43,030	97.7	
Informal votes		1,022	2.3	
Turnout		44,052	93.9	
Two-party-preferred result
Country	William Killen		54.2	−3.3
Labor	William Nulty		45.8	+3.3
Country hold		Swing	−3.3	

==== 1928 ====
1928 Australian federal election: Riverina
Party	Candidate	Votes	%	±%
Country	William Killen	22,377	57.5	+3.2
Labor	Joseph Casserly	16,538	42.5	−3.2
Total formal votes		38,915	94.8	
Informal votes		2,143	5.2	
Turnout		41,058	90.4	
Country hold		Swing	+3.2	

==== 1925 ====
1925 Australian federal election: Riverina
Party	Candidate	Votes	%	±%
Country	William Killen	20,490	54.3	+16.2
Labor	Essell Hoad	17,249	45.7	+4.6
Total formal votes		37,739	97.9	
Informal votes		794	2.1	
Turnout		38,533	86.1	
Country hold		Swing	+0.0	

==== 1922 ====
1922 Australian federal election: Riverina
Party	Candidate	Votes	%	±%
Labor	Essell Hoad	8,609	41.1	−5.3
Country	William Killen	5,551	26.5	+26.5
Nationalist	John Chanter	4,342	20.7	−31.9
Country	William Bartram	1,832	8.7	+8.7
Country	John Lorimer	606	2.9	+2.9
Total formal votes		20,940	91.5	
Informal votes		1,946	8.5	
Turnout		22,886	58.3	
Two-party-preferred result
Country	William Killen	11,378	54.3	+54.3
Labor	Essell Hoad	9,562	45.7	−3.0
Country gain from Nationalist		Swing	N/A	

=== Elections in the 1910s ===
==== 1919 ====
1919 Australian federal election: Riverina
Party	Candidate	Votes	%	±%
Nationalist	John Chanter	11,114	51.3	−7.9
Labor	Essell Hoad	10,530	48.7	+7.9
Total formal votes		21,644	97.8	
Informal votes		480	2.2	
Turnout		22,124	63.8	
Nationalist hold		Swing	−7.9	

==== 1917 ====
1917 Australian federal election: Riverina
Party	Candidate	Votes	%	±%
Nationalist	John Chanter	14,140	59.2	+11.3
Labor	Arthur Williams	9,726	40.8	−11.3
Total formal votes		23,866	96.8	
Informal votes		786	3.2	
Turnout		24,652	70.6	
Nationalist gain from Labor		Swing	+11.3	

==== 1914 ====
1914 Australian federal election: Riverina
Party	Candidate	Votes	%	±%
Labor	John Chanter	14,454	52.1	+3.1
Liberal	Franc Falkiner	13,315	47.9	−3.1
Total formal votes		27,769	97.3	
Informal votes		773	2.7	
Turnout		28,542	74.3	
Labor gain from Liberal		Swing	+3.1	

==== 1913 ====
1913 Australian federal election: Riverina
Party	Candidate	Votes	%	±%
Liberal	Franc Falkiner	11,674	51.0	+10.0
Labor	John Chanter	11,208	49.0	−7.2
Total formal votes		22,882	97.7	
Informal votes		550	2.3	
Turnout		23,432	64.8	
Liberal gain from Labor		Swing	+8.6	

==== 1910 ====
1910 Australian federal election: Riverina
Party	Candidate	Votes	%	±%
Labour	John Chanter	9,274	57.0	+57.0
Liberal	John Jackson	6,520	40.1	−59.9
Independent Liberal	Edmund O'Dwyer	464	2.9	+2.9
Total formal votes		16,258	97.8	
Informal votes		360	2.2	
Turnout		16,618	58.9	
Labour gain from Liberal		Swing	+57.0	

=== Elections in the 1900s ===
==== 1906 ====
1906 Australian federal election: Riverina
Party	Candidate	Votes	%	±%
Protectionist	John Chanter	6,662	54.1	+4.1
Anti-Socialist	John Jackson	5,658	45.9	−4.1
Total formal votes		12,320	95.3	
Informal votes		601	4.7	
Turnout		12,921	51.9	
Protectionist hold		Swing	+4.1	

==== 1904 by-election ====
1904 Riverina by-election
Party	Candidate	Votes	%	±%
Protectionist	John Chanter	5,547	51.7	+1.7
Free Trade	Robert Blackwood	5,184	48.3	−1.7
Total formal votes		10,731	97.6	
Informal votes		264	2.4	
Turnout		10,995	57.8	
Protectionist gain from Free Trade		Swing	+1.7	

==== 1903 ====
1903 Australian federal election: Riverina
Party	Candidate	Votes	%	±%
Free Trade	Robert Blackwood	4,341	50.0	+3.5
Protectionist	John Chanter	4,336	50.0	−3.5
Total formal votes		8,677	97.6	
Informal votes		210	2.4	
Turnout		8,887	48.9	
Free Trade gain from Protectionist		Swing	+3.5	

==== 1901 ====
1901 Australian federal election: Riverina
Party	Candidate	Votes	%	±%
Protectionist	John Chanter	3,275	53.5	+53.5
Free Trade	James Ashton	2,850	46.5	+46.5
Total formal votes		6,125	98.6	
Informal votes		86	1.4	
Turnout		6,211	62.4	
Protectionist win		(new seat)		
