= Electoral results for the Melbourne Province =

Electoral results for the Melbourne Province in Victorian state elections

This is a list of electoral results for the Melbourne Province in Victorian state elections.

== Members for Melbourne Province ==
Member 1	Party	Year	Member 2	Party	Member 3	Party		
William Hearn		1882	James Lorimer		Cornelius Ham			
William Hearn		1884	James Lorimer		Cornelius Ham			
William Hearn		1886	James Lorimer		Cornelius Ham			
James Service		1888	James Lorimer		Cornelius Ham			
James Service		1888	James Lorimer		Cornelius Ham		Member 4	Party
James Service		1889	James Lorimer		Cornelius Ham		George Coppin	
James Service		1889	Benjamin Benjamin		Cornelius Ham		George Coppin	
James Service		1890	Benjamin Benjamin		Cornelius Ham		George Coppin	
James Service		1892	Benjamin Benjamin		Cornelius Ham		George Coppin	
James Service		1892	Robert Reid		Cornelius Ham		George Coppin	
James Service		1894	Robert Reid		Cornelius Ham		George Coppin	
James Service		1895	Robert Reid		Cornelius Ham		Arthur Snowden	
James Service		1896	Robert Reid		Cornelius Ham		Arthur Snowden	
James Service		1898	Robert Reid		Cornelius Ham		Arthur Snowden	
John Mark Davies		1899	Robert Reid		Cornelius Ham		Arthur Snowden	
John Mark Davies		1900	Robert Reid		Cornelius Ham		Arthur Snowden	
John Mark Davies		1901	Robert Reid		Cornelius Ham		Arthur Snowden	
John Mark Davies		1902	Robert Reid		Cornelius Ham		Arthur Snowden	
John Mark Davies		1903	William Cain	Non-Labor	Cornelius Ham		Arthur Snowden	
John Mark Davies		1904	William Cain	Non-Labor				
John Mark Davies		1907	William Cain	Non-Labor				
John Mark Davies		1910	John McWhae					
John Mark Davies		1913	John McWhae					
John Mark Davies		1916	John McWhae					
John Mark Davies		1917	John McWhae	Nationalist				
Henry Weedon	Nationalist	1919	John McWhae	Nationalist				
Henry Cohen	Nationalist	1921	John McWhae	Nationalist				
Henry Cohen	Nationalist	1921	Herbert Smith	Nationalist				
Henry Cohen	Nationalist	1922	Herbert Smith	Nationalist				
Henry Cohen	Nationalist	1925	Herbert Smith	Nationalist				
Henry Cohen	Nationalist	1928	Herbert Smith	Nationalist				
Henry Cohen	Nationalist	1931	Herbert Smith	Nationalist				
Henry Cohen	United Australia	1931	Herbert Smith	United Australia				
Henry Cohen	United Australia	1934	Herbert Smith	United Australia				
Henry Cohen	United Australia	1936	George Wales	United Australia				
Daniel McNamara	Labor	1937	George Wales	United Australia				
Daniel McNamara	Labor	1938	Paul Jones	Labor				
Daniel McNamara	Labor	1940	William Beckett	Labor				
Daniel McNamara	Labor	1943	William Beckett	Labor				
Daniel McNamara	Labor	1946	William Beckett	Labor				
Fred Thomas	Labor	1948	William Beckett	Labor				
Fred Thomas	Labor	1949	William Beckett	Labor				
Fred Thomas	Labor	1952	Patrick Sheehy	Labor				
Fred Thomas	Labor	1955	Patrick Sheehy	Labor (A-C)				
Fred Thomas	Labor	1955	Patrick Sheehy	Labor (A-C)				
Fred Thomas	Labor	1958	Jack O'Connell	Labor				
Doug Elliot	Labor	1960	Jack O'Connell	Labor				
Doug Elliot	Labor	1961	Jack O'Connell	Labor				
Doug Elliot	Labor	1964	Jack O'Connell	Labor				
Doug Elliot	Labor	1967	Jack O'Connell	Labor				
Doug Elliot	Labor	1970	Jack O'Connell	Labor				
Doug Elliot	Labor	1972	Ivan Trayling	Labor				
Doug Elliot	Labor	1973	Ivan Trayling	Labor				
Doug Elliot	Labor	1976	Ivan Trayling	Labor				
Evan Walker	Labor	1979	Ivan Trayling	Labor				
Evan Walker	Labor	1982	Barry Pullen	Labor				
Evan Walker	Labor	1985	Barry Pullen	Labor				
Evan Walker	Labor	1988	Barry Pullen	Labor				
Doug Walpole	Labor	1992	Barry Pullen	Labor				
Doug Walpole	Labor	1996	Barry Pullen	Labor				
Gavin Jennings	Labor	1999	Glenyys Romanes	Labor				
Gavin Jennings	Labor	2002	Glenyys Romanes	Labor				

== Election results ==
=== Elections in the 2000s ===
2002 Victorian state election: Melbourne Province
Party	Candidate	Votes	%	±%
Labor	Gavin Jennings	61,810	48.7	−6.7
Greens	Robyn Evans	31,481	24.8	+24.8
Liberal	Michael Christo	30,771	24.2	−10.0
Democrats	Danii Coric	2,878	2.3	−8.0
Total formal votes		126,940	96.5	+0.4
Informal votes		4,652	3.5	−0.4
Turnout		131,592	90.0	
Two-party-preferred result
Labor	Gavin Jennings	67,059	52.8	−10.6
Greens	Robyn Evans	59,881	47.2	+47.2
Labor hold		Swing	−10.6	

=== Elections in the 1990s ===
1999 Victorian state election: Melbourne Province by-election
Party	Candidate	Votes	%	±%
Labor	Gavin Jennings	69,811	53.3	−1.6
Liberal	Khiet Nguyen	41,634	31.8	−1.8
Greens	Gurm Sekhon	11,126	8.5	+8.5
Democrats	Brendan Sharp	8,437	6.4	−2.0
Total formal votes		131,008	95.9	−1.0
Informal votes		5,555	4.1	+1.0
Turnout		136,563	89.6	
Two-party-preferred result
Labor	Gavin Jennings	82,617	63.1	−0.7
Liberal	Khiet Nguyen	48,336	36.9	+0.7
Labor hold		Swing	−0.7	

This election was caused by the vacancy following the resignation of Barry Pullen.

1999 Victorian state election: Melbourne Province
Party	Candidate	Votes	%	±%
Labor	Glenyys Romanes	73,484	56.0	+1.1
Liberal	Stuart McCraith	44,220	33.7	+0.2
Democrats	Scott Handsaker	13,517	10.3	+1.9
Total formal votes		131,221	96.0	−0.9
Informal votes		5,460	4.0	+0.9
Turnout		136,681	89.7	
Two-party-preferred result
Labor	Glenyys Romanes	83,865	63.9	+0.1
Liberal	Stuart McCraith	47,313	36.1	−0.1
Labor hold		Swing	+0.1	

1996 Victorian state election: Melbourne Province
Party	Candidate	Votes	%	±%
Labor	Barry Pullen	70,215	54.9	+3.2
Liberal	Stuart McCraith	42,862	33.5	−2.1
Democrats	Robert Stone	10,766	8.4	+1.4
Democratic Labor	John Mulholland	2,283	1.8	−0.2
Natural Law	Ngaire Mason	1,701	1.3	−2.3
Total formal votes		127,827	96.9	+2.5
Informal votes		4,097	3.1	−2.5
Turnout		131,924	90.9	
Two-party-preferred result
Labor	Barry Pullen	81,343	63.8	+4.9
Liberal	Stuart McCraith	46,128	36.2	−4.9
Labor hold		Swing	+4.9	

1992 Victorian state election: Melbourne Province
Party	Candidate	Votes	%	±%
Labor	Doug Walpole	60,570	51.7	−13.6
Liberal	John Miles	41,684	35.6	+0.9
Democrats	Robert Stone	8,197	7.0	+7.0
Natural Law	Ngaire Mason	4,298	3.7	+3.7
Democratic Labor	John Mulholland	2,312	2.0	+2.0
Total formal votes		117,061	94.4	+1.0
Informal votes		6,890	5.6	−1.0
Turnout		123,951	92.0	
Two-party-preferred result
Labor	Doug Walpole	68,723	58.9	−6.4
Liberal	John Miles	48,016	41.1	+6.4
Labor hold		Swing	−6.4	

=== Elections in the 1980s ===
1988 Victorian state election: Melbourne Province
Party	Candidate	Votes	%	±%
Labor	Barry Pullen	63,140	66.0	+2.8
Liberal	Katherine Edgar	32,562	34.0	+3.5
Total formal votes		95,702	93.4	−2.0
Informal votes		6,759	6.6	+2.0
Turnout		102,461	87.0	−1.6
Labor hold		Swing	−0.4	

1985 Victorian state election: Melbourne Province
Party	Candidate	Votes	%	±%
Labor	Evan Walker	65,653	63.2	
Liberal	Vincent Volpe	31,621	30.4	
Democrats	Simon James	6,560	6.3	
Total formal votes		103,834	95.4	
Informal votes		4,966	4.6	
Turnout		108,800	88.6	
Two-party-preferred result
Labor	Evan Walker	68,946	66.4	−4.5
Liberal	Vincent Volpe	34,888	33.6	+4.5
Labor hold		Swing	−4.5	

1982 Victorian state election: Melbourne Province
Party	Candidate	Votes	%	±%
Labor	Barry Pullen	55,348	61.2	−1.3
Liberal	Craig Baxter	27,935	30.9	−6.6
Democrats	Stephen Duthy	7,175	7.9	+7.9
Total formal votes		90,458	95.5	+0.7
Informal votes		4,245	4.5	−0.7
Turnout		94,703	89.0	+1.6
Two-party-preferred result
Labor	Barry Pullen		65.9	+3.4
Liberal	Craig Baxter		34.1	−3.4
Labor hold		Swing	+3.4	

- Two party preferred vote was estimated.

=== Elections in the 1970s ===
1979 Victorian state election: Melbourne Province
Party	Candidate	Votes	%	±%
Labor	Evan Walker	56,565	62.5	+4.7
Liberal	Bill Stanley	33,917	37.5	−4.7
Total formal votes		90,482	94.8	−0.4
Informal votes		4,946	5.2	+0.4
Turnout		95,428	87.4	+1.6
Labor hold		Swing	+4.7	

1976 Victorian state election: Melbourne Province
Party	Candidate	Votes	%	±%
Labor	Ivan Trayling	58,113	57.8	
Liberal	Bryce McNair	42,483	42.2	
Total formal votes		100,596	95.2	
Informal votes		5,119	4.8	
Turnout		105,715	85.8	
Labor hold		Swing		

1973 Victorian state election: Melbourne Province
Party	Candidate	Votes	%	±%
Labor	Doug Elliot	54,457	55.8	+5.2
Liberal	John Walsh	34,878	35.7	+4.6
Democratic Labor	Gordon Haberman	8,299	8.5	−9.8
Total formal votes		97.634	93.9	+0.5
Informal votes		6,286	6.1	−0.5
Turnout		103,920	88.8	−2.3
Two-party-preferred result
Labor	Doug Elliot		57.2	+4.9
Liberal	John Walsh		42.8	−4.9
Labor hold		Swing	+4.9	

- Two party preferred vote was estimated.

1972 Melbourne Province state by-election
Party	Candidate	Votes	%	±%
Labor	Ivan Trayling	unopposed		
Labor hold		Swing	N/A	

- This by-election was caused by the death of Jack O'Connell.

1970 Victorian state election: Melbourne Province
Party	Candidate	Votes	%	±%
Labor	Jack O'Connell	48,201	50.6	−3.6
Liberal	Norman Long	29,617	31.1	+2.2
Democratic Labor	Gordon Haberman	17,462	18.3	+5.6
Total formal votes		95,280	93.4	−0.5
Informal votes		6,765	6.6	+0.5
Turnout		102,045	91.1	+0.8
Two-party-preferred result
Labor	Jack O'Connell		52.3	−5.3
Liberal	Norman Long		47.7	+5.3
Labor hold		Swing	−5.3	

- Two party preferred vote was estimated.

=== Elections in the 1960s ===
1967 Victorian state election: Melbourne Province
Party	Candidate	Votes	%	±%
Labor	Douglas Elliot	54,443	54.2	
Liberal	Norman Long	29,000	28.9	
Democratic Labor	Gordon Haberman	12,749	12.7	
Independent	Frederick Levin	4,245	4.2	
Total formal votes		100,437	93.9	
Informal votes		6,511	6.1	
Turnout		106,948	90.3	
Two-party-preferred result
Labor	Douglas Elliot		57.6	
Liberal	Norman Long		42.4	
Labor hold		Swing		

- Two party preferred was estimated.

1964 Victorian state election: Melbourne Province
Party	Candidate	Votes	%	±%
Labor	Jack O'Connell	20,211	57.4	−3.0
Liberal and Country	Donald Gibson	8,647	24.6	+5.8
Democratic Labor	Leo Morrison	6,362	18.1	−2.6
Total formal votes		35,220	93.9	+0.4
Informal votes		2,275	6.1	−0.4
Turnout		37,495	91.9	+1.5
Two-party-preferred result
Labor	Jack O'Connell		59.2	−4.1
Liberal and Country	Donald Gibson		40.8	+40.8
Labor hold		Swing	N/A	

1961 Victorian state election: Melbourne Province
Party	Candidate	Votes	%	±%
Labor	Doug Elliot	22,982	60.4	−8.3
Democratic Labor	Harold Powell	7,884	20.7	−10.6
Liberal and Country	Reginald Cannon	7,156	18.8	+18.8
Total formal votes		38,022	93.5	−3.0
Informal votes		2,650	6.5	+3.0
Turnout		40,672	90.4	+2.1
Two-candidate-preferred result
Labor	Doug Elliot		63.3	−5.4
Democratic Labor	Harold Powell		36.7	+5.4
Labor hold		Swing	−5.4	

- Two party preferred vote was estimated.

1960 Melbourne Province state by-election
Party	Candidate	Votes	%	±%
Labor	Doug Elliot	24,378	74.6	+5.9
Democratic Labor	Maurie Sheehy	8,320	25.4	−5.9
Total formal votes		32,698	96.2	−0.3
Informal votes		1,274	3.8	+0.3
Turnout		33,972	72.5	−15.8
Labor hold		Swing	+5.9	

- This by-election was caused by the death of Fred Thomas.

=== Elections in the 1950s ===
1958 Victorian Legislative Council election: Melbourne Province
Party	Candidate	Votes	%	±%
Labor	Jack O'Connell	30,298	68.7	+5.4
Democratic Labor	Maurie Sheehy	13,784	31.3	−5.4
Total formal votes		44,082	96.5	−0.1
Informal votes		1,603	3.5	+0.1
Turnout		45,685	88.3	−0.7
Labor hold		Swing	+5.4	

- Maurie Sheehy was elected in 1952 as a member of Labor, then defected to the DLP in 1955.
