= Riverina by-election =

Riverina by-election may refer to one of two elections for the Australian House of Representatives seat of Riverina:

- 1904 Riverina by-election
- 1965 Riverina by-election
