= E. L. Killen =

Eric Lyle Killen (9 February 1892 – 9 February 1955) was a grazier in New South Wales, Australia.

== History ==
Killen was born at Prahran, Victoria, a member of the prominent Killen family of New South Wales pastoralists.

He was a member of the N.S.W. Cattle Breeders' Association and its president in 1939; also the Graziers' Association of New South Wales and a member of its general council 1931 to 1932 and 1947 to 1948. He was president for the year 1945–46 and their representative on the Australian Woolgrowers' Council from 1939 to 1948.

During World War II he served on the Central Wool Committee (1939 to 1942) and chairman of the Country Party from 1940 to 1942.

He did much to improve cattle breeding in Australia: In 1937 he visited America where purchased a selection of stud cattle to improve his Antrim Poll Shorthorn herd. He was president of the United Stud Beef Cattle Breeders' Association of Australia from 1942 to 1945.

=== Personal ===
Killen married Irene Ella Henderson on 26 April 1913; they had one son and five daughters.

He died at "Stranraer", Cowra, New South Wales, aged 63. His remains were ashed at the Northern Suburbs Crematorium.

== Family ==
Edward Killen (c. 1833 – 4 January 1909) emigrated to Australia from Co. Antrim in 1876 and acquired Carnerney station and Elsinora station, near Wanaaring, and "Riverslea", Cowra. He married Isabella (died 1897) and Mary (died 20 February 1919).

- William Wilson Killen (1860 – 20 February 1939) born in Co. Antrim, partnered R. E. Young and leased Bull Plain Estate, and Pirillie Station. He was a president of the Farmers' and Settlers' Association, and was elected to the House of Representatives seat of Riverina in 1922, 1925 and 1928. He married Marion Young (died 1926), on 2 June 1891. Their children included

- Harold Charles Killen (1894–1956) of "Barellan"
- Edward Cecil Lyle Killen (1896–1965) married Bessie Marie Rier on 3 January 1919, lived Benerembah station, between Narrandera and Hay, near Darlington Point.

- Richard Lyle Killen (20 May 1920 – 23 August 1942), RAAF Sgt pilot

- William "Willie" Bertram Sydney Killen (1900–1966)

- Edward Killen (c. 1865 – 11 December 1933) born in Co. Antrim, purchased "Nymagee55" at Cobar, "Moonagee" and "Gerar" at Nyngan, and Wee Jasper station, south-west of Yass. He was prominent member of the Graziers' Association of NSW and several similar organisations. He married Annie Lyle Young (died 1915). Annie Lyle Young and Marion Young (above) were sisters, daughters of Charles Young MLA (1825–1908) of "Abbeyville", Windsor, Melbourne.

- Eric Lyle Killen (9 February 1892 – 9 February 1955) married Irene Ella Henderson on 26 April 1913

- Neal Beresford Killen, of Orange, New South Wales
- Isobel Beatrice Killen (born 26 January 1914) married R. Gordon, of Young, New South Wales; later Ekin?
- Thora Lyle married David Hamish Craig, lived at Mosman, New South Wales
- Bernice Muriel Killen married William Godfrey Thomas c. 1937, lived Lindfield, New South Wales; elsewhere J. Thomas
- Anne Irene "Nan" Killen (born 1919) married James Campbell Walker in 1940, lived at Narromine, N.S.W.; surname Westcott in 1967
- Diana Lyle Killen married Donald Patterson MacGillivray c. 1951, lived in Scotland

- Geoffrey Lyle Killen (30 October 1899 – 2 June 1975) married Una Phelps Suttor on 7 March 1923, lived at Moonagee Station, near Nyngan.

- Bryce Killen (30 December 1923 – 2020), pastoralist, founder of Willeroo/Scott Creek sorghum project.
- Darrel Killen (1925–2014) cinema developer in ACT

- eldest daughter Mary Killen (died 11 June 1927)
- second daughter Jane Killen (died 2 August 1947) married John Ekin on 4 February 1892
- third daughter Isabella "Ella" Killen married William Dunlop (died 20 July 1920), of "Needlewood", Garah, and "Taviton", Ashford, in 1893.
- youngest daughter Hannah Killen (died 19 July 1946) married William Todd (died 18 February 1940) of "Ulinga", Garah, on 23 June 1900.

The Australian politician Jim Killen (1925–2007) was not closely related.
