= Doug Elliot (politician) =

Australian politician (1917–1989)

Douglas George Elliot (12 February 1917 – 25 March 1989) was an Australian politician.

Elliot was born in Caulfield to John and Laurel Agnes Monica, née Hickey; his father was a sales manager. He attended Scotch College until the age of thirteen, after which he attended night school while working. He joined J. C. Williamson's theatre company and, from 1934, became a radio and television announcer. He worked at many Melbourne radio stations including: 3AK, 3AW, 3KZ, 3UZ and 3XY.

On 12 January 1938, Elliot married Heather Bernice Pearce, a salesgirl, with whom he had three children. He served with the Royal Australian Air Force during World War II. He worked for HSV-7, the Seven Network channel in Melbourne, first for the Mickey Mouse Club and then as an announcer for World of Sport.

In 1946, he joined the Labor Party. He was the Labor candidate in the federal seat of Maribyrnong at the 1958 federal election but was unsuccessful. In 1960, he was elected to the Victorian Legislative Council in a by-election for Melbourne Province. He served as a backbencher until 1979, when he lost preselection to Evan Walker. However, that year he was elected to Essendon City Council, and was mayor from 1982 to 1983. Elliot died on 25 March 1989.

Victorian Legislative Council
Preceded by Fred Thomas	Member for Melbourne; 1960–1979; Served alongside: Jack O'Connell; Ivan Trayling	Succeeded by Evan Walker
