= Braz Anthony Fernandes =

Portuguese historian (1881–1951)

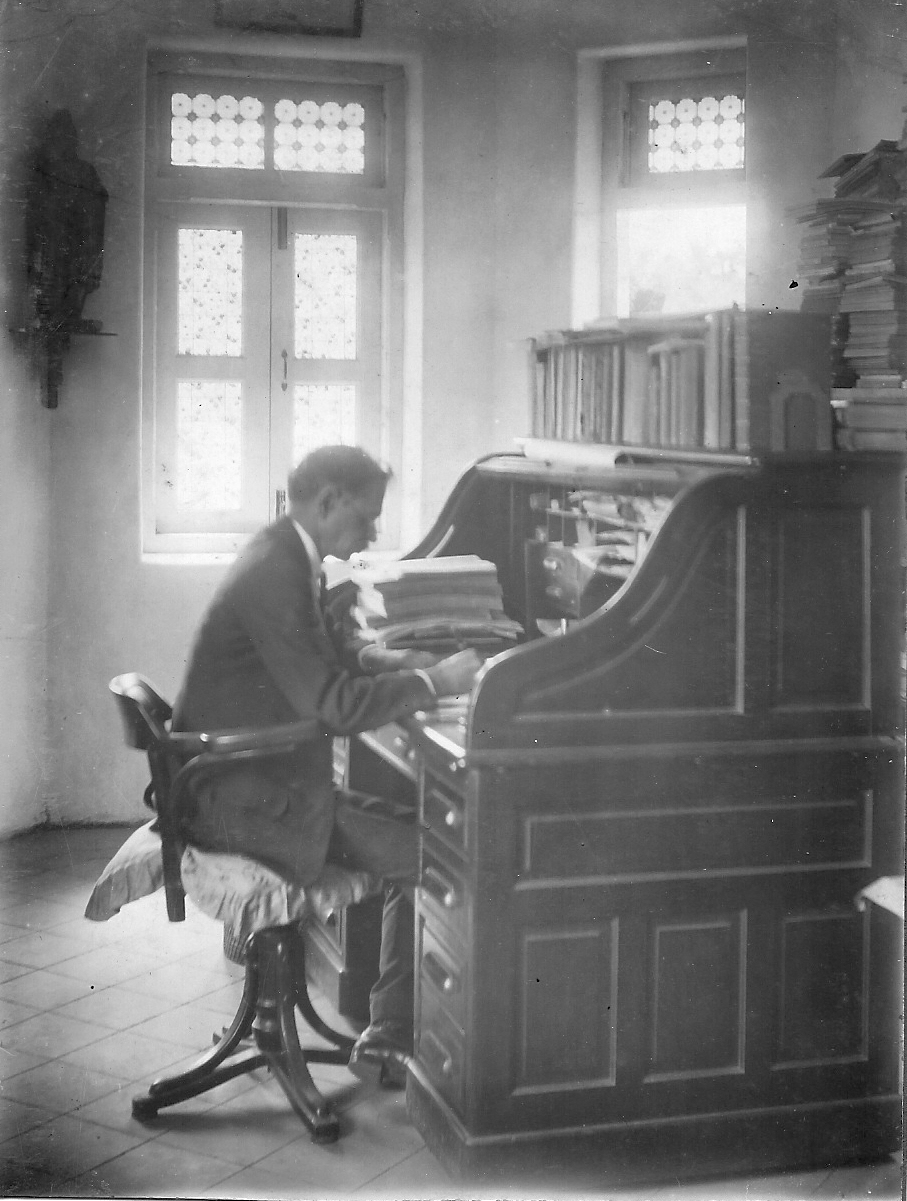
- Born: Braz Anthony Fernandes; 1 August 1881; Goa, Portuguese India
- Died: 9 June 1951 (aged 70)
- Resting place: St. Andrew's Church, Mumbai
- Occupation: Historian
- Known for: Annual Bibliography of Indian History and Indology; Bandra Its Religious and Secular History
- Spouse: Eugénie Esther Cordeiro (m. 1911)
- Children: 5
- Relatives: Braz Fernandes (grandfather); JB Simmons (son-in-law)
- Awards: Gold Medal - Bombay Historical Society

Braz Anthony Fernandes (1 August 1881 – 9 June 1951) was a Portuguese historian and the founder of the Bombay Historical Society.

== Personal life ==
Braz Anthony Fernandes was born in Goa on 1 August 1881 and came to Bombay at the age of eight. He married Eugénie Esther Cordeiro in 1911 and had five children: Albert Anthony Gabriel, Barbara Angela, Charlotte Mary Sophie, Domnic Claudius, and Ernest Braz. His grandfather was Braz Fernandes from Chorão Island, and his granddaughter (from Charlotte) is Bernadette Simmons, who married Ivan Trayling.

Albert had two children: Vijay and Leela. Barbara had no children but was an excellent aunt. Charlotte had one daughter: Bernadette. Domnic Claudius Fernandes married Olga Cecilia Pereira and had three children: John Claud Fernandes, Jeanne Claudette Fernandes, and Indira Maria Fernandes. Ernest had one daughter: Eugénie.

== Career ==
Fernandes, though a mechanical engineer by training, had various interests and studied botany, zoology, ornithology and knew painting and music. His main pursuit though was history, particularly the local history of Bombay. He spent many years delving into the records of Bombay from 17th to 19th centuries by collecting valuable data from church archives and graveyards, and obtaining Portuguese records of Bombay.

The Times of India stated, "what he did not know about Bombay was not worth knowing."

He co-founded the Bombay Historical Society in 1925 along with Henry Heras, which grew from strength-to-strength. The society started publishing its own journal in 1928 and in 1931 organised the first Bombay Historical Congress, which brought scholars from all over India and paved the way for the Indian History Congress.

One of his major contributions was the Annual Bibliography of Indian History and Indology, which he started in 1938 and contained five volumes. This monumental work was appreciated by scholars both in India and abroad. As a result, he was awarded the Bombay Historical Society's gold medal by the President of the Indian History Congress in 1947.

He was also the author of Bandra Its Religious and Secular History, the most authoritative book on the area even today. It gives the history of Bandra, its topography and a description of its antiquities dating from the days of the Portuguese.

He was a Fellow of the Geographical Society of Lisbon and a Member of the Royal Asiatic Society of Great Britain and Ireland.

== Death ==
Fernandes died in June 1951, whereupon a condolence meeting of the Bombay Historical Society was held at the Prince of Wales Museum in the Library Room. His Excellency Mangal Das Pakvasa, Governor of Madhya Pradesh and President of the Bombay Historical Society, sent a condolence message on the occasion. G. Samuelson attended the condolence meeting on behalf of the United States Information Service.
