= St Kilda Library =

Public library in Melbourne, Australia

Coordinates: 37.8678°S 144.9889°E

St Kilda Library is a public library in Melbourne, Australia. The library is located in the suburb of St Kilda, in the City of Port Philip. The building was recognised by the Australian Institute of Architects as one of the “notable public buildings” designed by award-winning architect Enrico Taglietti.

== History ==
The history of the St Kilda Library dates back to 1860, when the St Kilda Council received a community request to fund a free public library to be built coinciding with a building for the Mechanics’ Institute. This plan did not come to fruition and instead by 1863 a book collection was housed in the old Town Hall located at the junction of Barkly and Acland Streets in St Kilda and then in 1910 in the current Town Hall in Carlisle Street. The library did not survive and was forced to close within the year.

In the 1930s local communists advocated for a Municipal Library - as well as Home-Help - but the council was very anti-communist at the time and due to their perception of the group who advocated the library, in addition to the expense, they rejected the idea of a library.

The Free Library Board proposed the creation of a library in 1947 but again it was dismissed.

In April 1953 the St Kilda Library Promotion Committee was formed with R.S. Veale as president, and Mrs Elizabeth Hogg, a teacher living in Carlisle Street, as Secretary. However, the Council once again rejected the arguments for a library, with the Town Clerk even re-iterating the reasons against it in the centenary booklet: "it would cost thousands of pounds per year to operate and, generally speaking, would provide mostly books of fiction and thus come into active competition with a large number of Lending Library businesses established in St Kilda." The Council even later introduced new arguments against the community's wishes for a library, stating that a library would encourage the reading of fiction which, in turn, would encourage juvenile delinquency.

Parents at the Nelson Street kindergarten got together and formed the St Kilda Library Establishment Committee with TAA pilot Ivan Scown as president, former librarian Jenny Love as Secretary and Angela Pedicini as Treasurer. The Committee persuaded the council to request that the Free Library Services Board conduct a Library Survey in St Kilda. The report, presented in 1961, recommended the creation of a library but similar to the past, the St Kilda Council refused.

The council's opposition to the library was broken when Ivan Trayling was elected as Councillor in 1967. Trayling had campaigned very vocally on the need for a library and after winning the election the Council realised the amount of community dissatisfaction on its stance against the library and decided to go ahead with its creation.

The Council set aside $50,000 in 1967 and asked Barrett Reid, the Executive Officer of the Library Services Division of the Library Council of Victoria, to revise the 1961 survey.

A library sub-committee was formed in mid 1969, which was the first St Kilda council committee to include community representatives as advisory members. Ivan Trayling headed it as chairman, with other committee members being Cr. Hall-Kenny, Cr. Manning, Cr. Clark, Jenny Love, Reverend Brother F.I. McCarthy, Bernard Rechter and Deputy Town Clerk Bill Sisson.

Enrico Taglietti was appointed as the architect and in December 1971 he accepted a tender on behalf of the council from the M. Notkin Construction Company of Caulfield South, for the amount of $417,000 to build the library at 150 Carlisle Street.

The library's foundation stone was laid in August 1972 by the now mayor Ivan Trayling and on 14 May 1973 Sir Rohan Delacombe, Governor of Victoria, officially opened the library, in what has since become a local landmark. Commander R.S. Veale, the original Chairman of the Library Promotion Committee, was invited on 15 May 1973 to borrow the first book and chose a biography of Wilfrid Kent-Hughes.

Between 1992 and 1994, an extension was added by Melbourne architecture firm Ashton Raggatt McDougall (ARM) which provided a new entrance wing as well as seeking to redefine the public plaza and façade of the library facing onto Carlisle Street.

== Significance ==
Taglietti's design is described by architect and author Richard Peterson as having an “unconstrained” and “stylised” character that is “comfortably settled” in its context. In 2007, Taglietti who was born in Milan, was awarded the prestigious Gold Medal by The Royal Australian Institute of Architects (RAIA). The jury cited his “Australian architectural vision as seen through Italian eyes” making him “an outstanding architect of national significance”.

As a testament to the community's engagement, in the 2012/2013 financial year over 365,000 visitors used the St Kilda Library services.

== Physical description and function ==
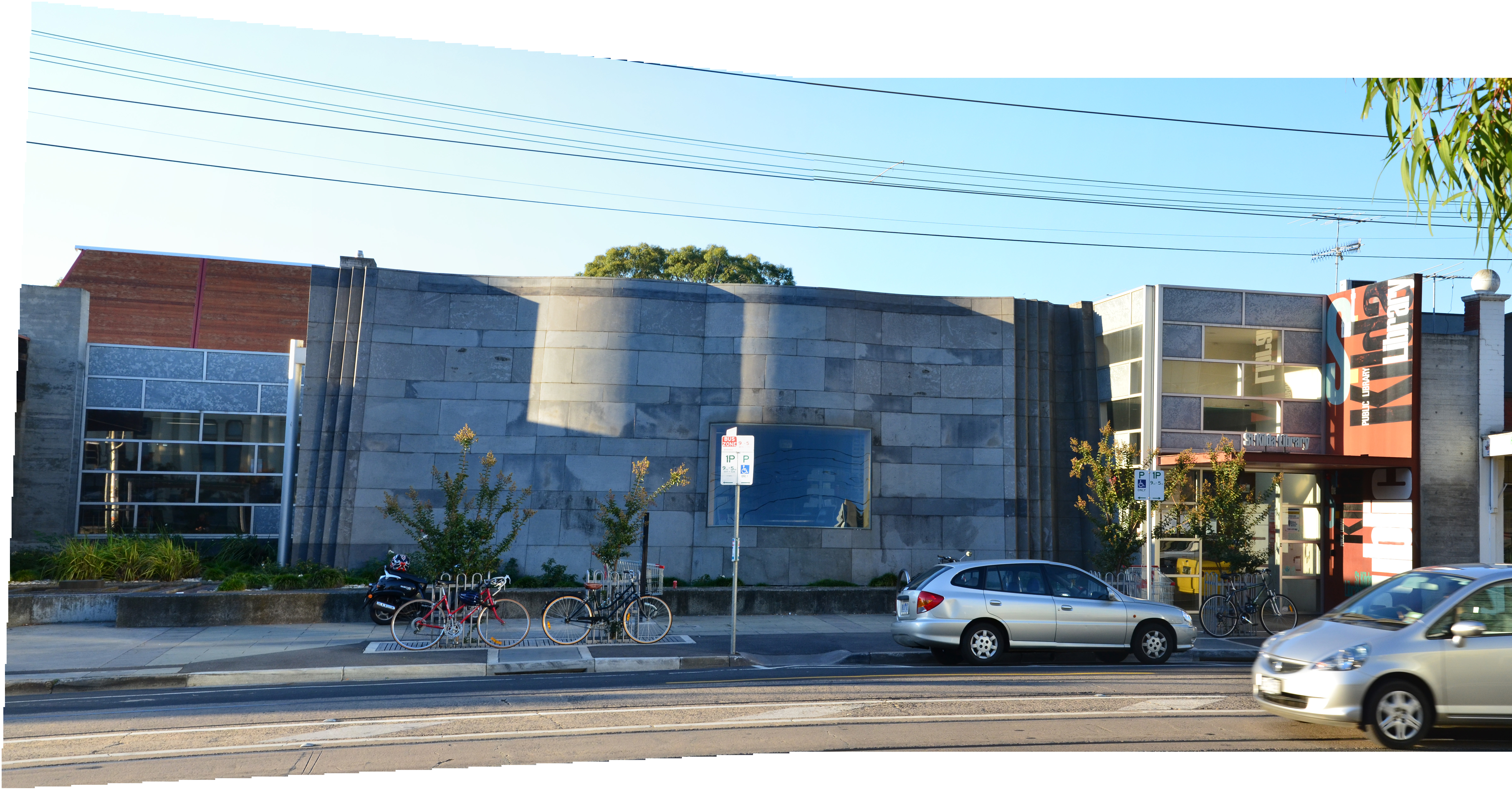
Front Elevation of St Kilda Library

Taglietti's building houses the library, a meeting room and additional community facilities. ARM's extension provided what the firm describe as an “upgrade of existing facilities, providing additional book stacks, main desk, entry and public face”. Wedged between the busy public Carlisle Street to the South and the residential Duke Street in the North the building takes up nearly 50 square metres. The ground floor of the library is raised above street level one metre high and is accessed via a ramp through the entry wing of the ARM extension. The building also contains parking and a plant room underground, with entry via Duke Street. The library is constructed from a minimal selection of materials-concrete construction with timber detailing. The concrete is left in an exposed unfinished state, “either bush-hammered or revealing the lines of its timber board formwork”. “Untreated softwood” timber boards are used for the roof, eaves, ceiling, window frames and an internal “pyramidal roof”. Taglietti's design makes use of horizontal planes in the thick continuous ground slab and cantilevered roof above, which extend out beyond the inclined walls. Taglietti has employed light, scale and screens to differentiate between areas of varying program in library. This is evident in the children's section where the bookshelves are reduced versions of those throughout the library and colourful lights are hung about 1.8 metres above the floor.

The building is widely considered to be of Brutalist design. Richard Peterson identifies characteristics of the building pertaining to this style as its use of unfinished timber and concrete revealing the lines of its formwork as well as the overemphasis of particular components of the building, specifically in the “deep fascias and spandrels”.

ARM describe their extension as the image of a “bluestone clad book” invoking the role of books in libraries through the symbolism of its curving bluestone form. The inclusion of an s-profiled window is the architects’ reference to the emergence of electronic technology in the place of the hard copy book with its screen-like appearance.

== Key influences and design approach ==
Similarities are noted between the Brutalist architectural style of the St Kilda library and the work of architect Le Corbusier, particularly in the expression of unfinished concrete and “oversized elements”. Peterson draws further links to architect Carlo Scarpa who shares Taglietti's Italian tradition and whose influences can be seen in “the use of natural materials and the layered platforms, which stratify the meeting of the building and its site”. The RAIA jury panel cited the use of “long, horizontal flat roofs and balconies, sloping fascias and balustrades, and battered walls” as overriding motifs in Taglietti's work.

ARM describe their intention with the extension to be “the development of a civic space linking the Town Hall and its strong 19th Century façade with the Taglietti library across the street”.

== Awards ==
Taglietti was awarded the 2007 Gold Medal by The Royal Australian Institute of Architects and the jury cited St Kilda Library in its list of Taglietti's “Notable public buildings”.

Ashton Raggatt McDougall received two awards for their extension from The Royal Australian Institute of Architects in 1995. They were a Commendation for Institutional Alterations and Extensions and a Commendation for Interior Architecture.
