= Jack O'Connell (Australian politician) =

Australian politician

Geoffrey John O'Connell (16 June 1903 – 20 April 1972) was an Australian politician.

He was born in Richmond to contractor John O'Connell and Annie McNamara. He was a tanner and publican before entering politics, and joined the Labor Party around 1919. He was the cousin of Jack Cremean and Bert Cremean, both Labor politicians, and on 18 December 1926 married Lillian May Lester, with whom he had four children. He served on Richmond City Council from 1948 to 1972, and was mayor from 1957 to 1958 and from 1964 to 1965. In 1958 he was elected to the Victorian Legislative Council for Melbourne Province. He served until his death in Richmond in 1972.

Victorian Legislative Council
Preceded by Patrick Sheehy	Member for Melbourne; 1958–1972; Served alongside: Fred Thomas; Doug Elliot	Succeeded by Ivan Trayling
