= Braz Fernandes =

Portuguese diplomat (1791–1865)

Braz Fernandes ComC
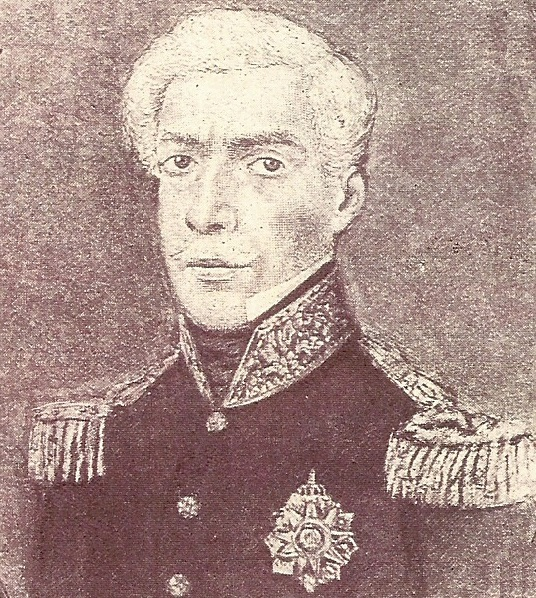
- Portrait of Fernandes

Vice-Consul of Portugal at Bombay
- Monarch: Ferdinand II of Portugal
- Preceded by: None

Personal details
- Born: 3 February 1791 Vagator, Bardez, Goa
- Died: 9 November 1865 (aged 74)
- Resting place: St. Andrew's Church, Mumbai
- Spouse: Quiteria de Mello e Fernandes
- Children: 8
- Relatives: Braz Anthony Fernandes (grandson)
- Occupation: Diplomat; philanthropist

Braz Fernandes ComC (3 February 1791 – 9 November 1865) was a Portuguese diplomat and philanthropist. He was the scion of an ancient and wealthy family.

== Personal life ==
Braz Fernandes was born to Manuel Salvador Fernandes and Ana Maria Fernandes. He was married to Quiteira de Mello. Quiteira's grandfather, John Barretto, was known for founding the Barretto Charity School in Cavel, Bombay (present-day Mumbai), now known as Barretto High School, where originally education was free, and the school taught Portuguese, Latin, and English.

Fernandes had eight children: John (who became a Reverend), Euphrasia, Antonio Lourenco, Quiteria Angelica, Matilda (Sister Philomena), Gabriel, Anna Maria, and Braz. The eminent historian Braz Anthony Fernandes was his grandson, from Gabriel.

== Career ==
Fernandes was the first ever Vice-Consul for Portugal in Bombay. Prior to the establishment of the Vice-Consulate in Bombay, the Portuguese representative was known as the Consular Agent.

== Order of Christ ==
Fernandes's tombstone states he was a Commander of the Order of Christ (Portugal). It is not known whether he was appointed directly to Commander or whether he was promoted to there from the rank of Knight. Knights in the Order of Christ were not advanced to a commandery until they had given proofs of their military prowess and valour, in those fortresses which Portugal retained on the African coast.

According to the then statutes of the order, the knights were obliged to prove at least four degrees of hereditary nobility, but this requirement could be dispensed with by the sovereign. The knights were under the same regulations and enjoyed the same privileges as those of the Order of Calatrava in Spain.

== Philanthropy ==
Amador Viegas founded the Maria Viegas Girls School in March 1874, but his untimely death shortly thereafter put the school in jeopardy as he died before he could make a provision that would have guaranteed the permanence of the school.

Deprived of the founder's support, the school would have closed down prematurely but for the intervention of Braz Fernandes who spared no sacrifices to give a new lease of life to the school. The Convent School is today the School of the Sacred Hearts of Jesus and Mary.
