= JB Simmons =

Indian Navy officer (1917–2001)

Commander John Berchman Simmons
- Born: 1 July 1917; Bombay, British India
- Died: 2001 (aged 83–84); Mumbai
- Spouse: Charlotte Fernandes
- Children: 1
- Relatives: Braz Anthony Fernandes (father-in-law); Ivan Trayling (son-in-law)
- Military career
- Allegiance: India
- Branch: Royal Indian Navy; Indian Navy
- Service years: 1941–1957
- Nickname: Dick
- Commands: HMIS Bombay (J249); INS Venduruthy; Naval Barracks, Bombay
- Conflicts: World War II
- Awards: 1939-1945 Star; War Medal 1939–1945; Burma Star; Indian Independence Medal; Videsh Seva Medal; 9 Years Long Service Medal

John Berchman Simmons (1 July 1917 – 2001), better known as JB Simmons, was a former Royal Indian Navy officer.

== Personal life ==
John Berchman Simmons, or other known by his nickname "Dick", attended Cathedral School in Bombay and merited a Government scholarship in 1933.

He passed the Senior Cambridge Examination in 1935 and joined A.F. Ferguson & Co, Chartered Accountants, in 1936 as an apprentice for five years.

He did a commercial course at Sydenham College of Commerce & Economics, Bombay and completed his articles in April 1941.

He married Dr Charlotte Fernandes - who was a paediatrician and published her own children's health medical journal - whose father was Braz Anthony Fernandes. They had one daughter, Bernadette, who married Ivan Trayling.

== Naval career ==
Simmons joined the Royal Indian Navy Volunteer Reserve on 1 May 1941 - in World War II - as an Executive Sub-Lieutenant. Although he was better qualified to join the Navy as a Paymaster, he requested that he be allowed to join the Executive Branch as it was from this Branch that future Captains of the Fleet were selected and leadership was one of the main qualities required. His request was accepted.

Prior to being given his first sea billet he topped the examination lists in subjects such as Signals & Navigation, competing against Officers.

During the War, the long experience gained at sea was mostly under war conditions.

He was appointed 1st Lieutenant (2nd in Command) of a ship in late 1942, the INS Kalvati. Although there was a Lieutenant of the Executive Branch also serving on the ship who was more senior, he was selected as the more capable Second-In-Command, which required permission from Naval Headquarters. For two years he was attached to the Arabian-Bengal-Ceylon Escort Group and took part in innumerable convoys in the Indian Ocean when the Japanese Fleet, and later submarines and aircraft were active in this area. His ship was on patrol of the Arakan Coast, at the time when Burma was under Japanese occupation. Prior to the invasion of Burma, he was a member of the team of Officers who made a survey of the beaches and approaches to the Arakan Coast, in order to facilitate the landings that were planned by the Army Command.

At the close of hostilities in 1945 Simmons applied to transfer to the permanent cadre of the Indian Navy for a Permanent Commission. After going before the Services Selection Board at Lonavala, he was selected.

In 1945 Simmons was given his first sea-going command, the INS Nasik, subsequently taking over INS Investigator, Hindustan and Assam. Prior to proceeding abroad in 1948 he held the appointment of Staff Officer Appoints on the Staff of Rear Admiral Battery Flag Officer Bombay and later was appointed First Lieutenant of the Naval Barracks. During this period he carried out the duties of Commander Barracks in addition to his duties as First Lieutenant, for two months, until a Commander was appointed to the post.

In 1948 he was one of six officers selected from the entire Indian Navy for a period of training with the British Mediterranean Fleet, where he served for three months on HMS Ocean, an aircraft carrier. In the same year he was one of the officers selected for part of the crew that proceeded to the UK to bring back the first Indian cruiser, the INS Delhi (C74), to India. Whilst in the UK awaiting the commissioning of the INS Delhi, he did a Gunnery Course in Chatham.

He was then the most junior officer of his branch wearing a "brass hat" in the Indian Navy.

After a year serving on the INS Delhi, Simmons was promoted to Lieutenant Commander, a full year earlier than the normal course.

In 1952 Simmons took command of the INS Bombay, a minesweeper, one of six at the time which composed the 31st Minesweeping Squadron. In October 1952 Simmons took charge of the entire Squadron from Captain Krishan DSC. During this time Simmons set a new record in the Indian Navy for berthing six ships at Cochin Jetty in 13 minutes. He then set another record at the Naval Docks in Bombay, where he brought the Squadron alongside the Breakwater at the Naval Docks in Bombay in close formation in 16 minutes, a feat that had never been attempted before.

In late 1953 still as an Acting Commander, Simmons was appointed Training Commander on the Staff of the Commodore-in-charge Cochin...the first Indian Officer to hold this appointment. In 1954 he was asked to take over as Commander of the Naval Base at Cochin, INS Venduruthy. He was in charge of over 1000 men and 100 officers.

During this time at Cochin, Simmons received Marshal Josip Broz Tito of Yugoslavia, Prime Minister Jawaharlal Nehru and Lord Louis Mountbatten.

In 1956 Simmons was appointed as Commander of the Naval Barracks at Bombay, in charge of 800 men and 150 officers.

Simmons retired from the Navy in August 1957.

=== Medals ===
1939-1945 Star

War Medal 1939–1945

Burma Star

Indian Independence Medal

Videsh Seva Medal

9 Years Long Service Medal

== Later years ==
"Well known in Bombay social circles" Simmons had a successful career at Burma Shell and GAC (Gulf Agency Corporation) after the Navy.

He was one of the first Indian members of the Royal Bombay Yacht Club.
