= Enrico Taglietti =

Italian-born Australian architect (1926–2019)

Enrico Taglietti AO
- Born: 16 April 1926; Milan, Lombardy, Italy
- Died: 3 May 2019 (aged 93); Canberra, ACT
- Occupation: Architect
- Spouse: Francesca Taglietti
- Awards: Australian Institute of Architects Gold Medal, 2007; Sir Roy Grounds Award for Enduring Architecture 1995, 2006, 2014
- Practice: Enrico Taglietti Architect
- Buildings: Civic Cinema Center 1966, Embassy of Italy 1967, Dickson Library 1969, St Kilda Library 1971, Paterson House 1970, Apostolic Nunciature 1977
- Website: enricotaglietti.com

Enrico Taglietti AO (16 April 1926 – 3 May 2019) was an Italian-born Australian architect, known for designing a number of acclaimed buildings in Australia. In 2007, at the age of 81, he was recipient of the Australian Institute of Architects Gold Medal, the second oldest individual to be awarded.

== Biography ==
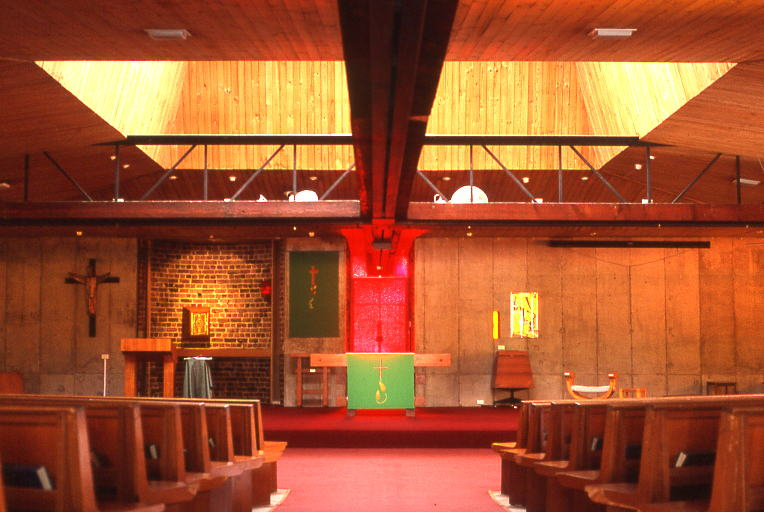
Interior of St Anthony's Catholic Church, Marsfield NSW (1968)

Enrico Taglietti was born in Milan in 1926 and graduated in 1954 from the Milan Polytechnic University, where he studied under Gio Ponti, Franco Albini, Bruno Zevi and Pier Luigi Nervi. In 1955, he was sent to Australia by the Italian government to find a site in Canberra for the Italian embassy (which he ended up designing). He loved the unspoilt environment of Australia and ended up settling in Canberra from the early 1960s. He designed many iconic buildings, mainly in Canberra, but also in Sydney and Melbourne. They are in a Modernist, sometimes Brutalist, late-20th-century Organic Style, designed "from the inside out", according to the architect, with an emphasis on atmosphere, light and poetry. Taglietti was celebrated in 2018 as the featured architect of the Canberra Design Festival, with a whole day symposium dedicated to his work.

He wrote on his website: “We stand upon the verge of an abyss, the abyss created by the culture of egoism and puritanical righteousness. Men have lost their belief in the invisible. Architecture is no longer a WONDER but a temptation for the profitable. The aim of my architecture is to express the invisible, joy and music, silence, light and the desire to be”.

Taglietti died on 3 May 2019, at the age of 93.

=== Honours and recognition ===
Taglietti was made an Officer of the Order of Australia in the 2020 Australia Day Honours for "distinguished service to architecture, particularly in the Australian Capital Territory, to education, and to professional organisations." The award was announced after his death.

The Canberra Museum and Gallery hosted a major exhibition of Taglietti's work during 2025 and 2026.

== Partial list of works ==
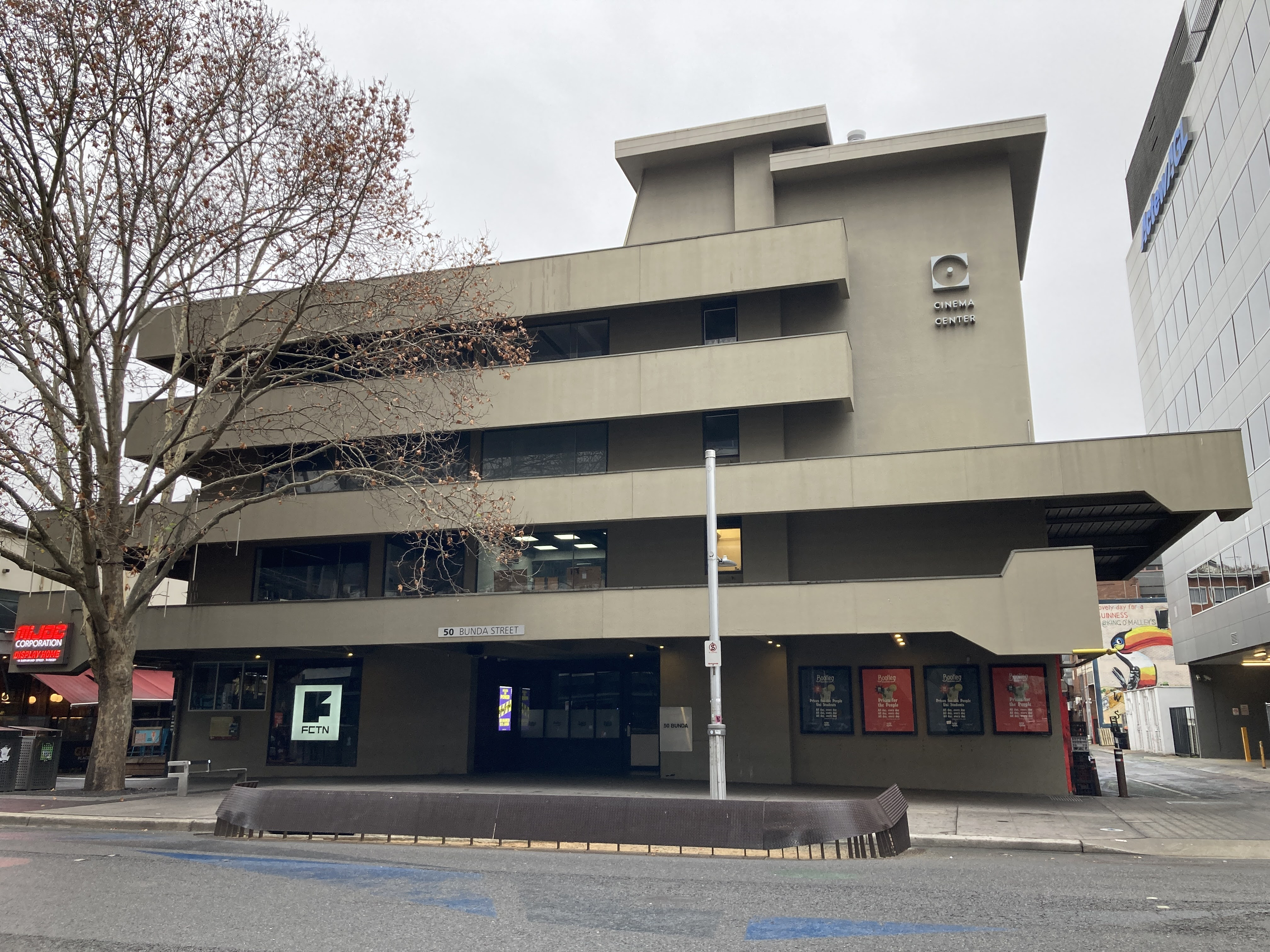
Taglietti's Cinema Centre building (Civic, ACT), which was heritage listed in 2021

- Embassy of Italy, Deakin (ACT) (1967)
- Dickson Library (ACT) (1968)
- St Anthony's Catholic Church, Marsfield (NSW) (1968)
- St Kilda Library (VIC) (1971)
- Flynn Primary School (ACT) (1972)
- Giralang Primary School (ACT) (1974)
- Australian War Memorial Annex (ACT) (1977)
- Gowrie Primary School (ACT) (1981)
- Cinema Center, Civic (ACT) for Darrel Killen
- Many private residences all over Canberra, including one for Darrel Killen (above)
