= Fred Thomas (Australian politician) =

Australian politician

Frederick Miles Thomas (18 January 1882 – 2 June 1960) was an Australian politician.

He was born in Emerald Hill to boilermaker Frederick George Thomas and Mary Ann Benfield. He was a founding member of the Timber Workers' Union in 1898 and twice served as its president; he was its federal secretary in 1919. Around 1908 he married Helena Eliza Warren, with whom he had four children. He was a member of the Victorian Socialist Party and then the Labor Party, of which he was Collingwood branch secretary. From 1919 to 1936 he was an organiser with the Clothing Trades Union, and from 1937 to 1947 worked as a dog registrar and housing inspector for Collingwood City Council. In 1948 he was elected to the Victorian Legislative Council for Melbourne Province. He served as a Labor backbencher until his death at East Melbourne in 1960.

Victorian Legislative Council
Preceded by Daniel McNamara	Member for Melbourne; 1948–1960; Served alongside: William Beckett; Patrick Sheehy; Jack O'Connell	Succeeded by Doug Elliot
