= Darrel Killen =

Edward Darrel Lyle Killen (28 November 1925 – 31 December 2014) was an Australian property developer, film enthusiast, and founder of a chain of independent cinemas, the Cinema Center Group. He was a member of the Killen family of pastoralists.

== History ==
Killen grew up on his parents' property north of Nyngan, and was educated at Edgecliff Preparatory School and Sydney Grammar School.

He enlisted with the 2nd AIF on 3 December 1943 and served in New Guinea. He resumed his education at the Universities of Sydney and Oxford, where he gained his PhD, then went on to Chicago, where in 1954 he gained a doctorate in political science, then began working as a research officer in the Prime Minister's Department. He transferred to the National Capital Development Commission in 1958. He left the Public Service to establish a company, Moteliers, to establish a chain of motels, several designed by Franca and Enrico Taglietti: the Town House Motels in Canberra (opened 1961), and Wagga Wagga (opened 1963), then sold the company. At some stage he took on a business partner, Ross Gibson.

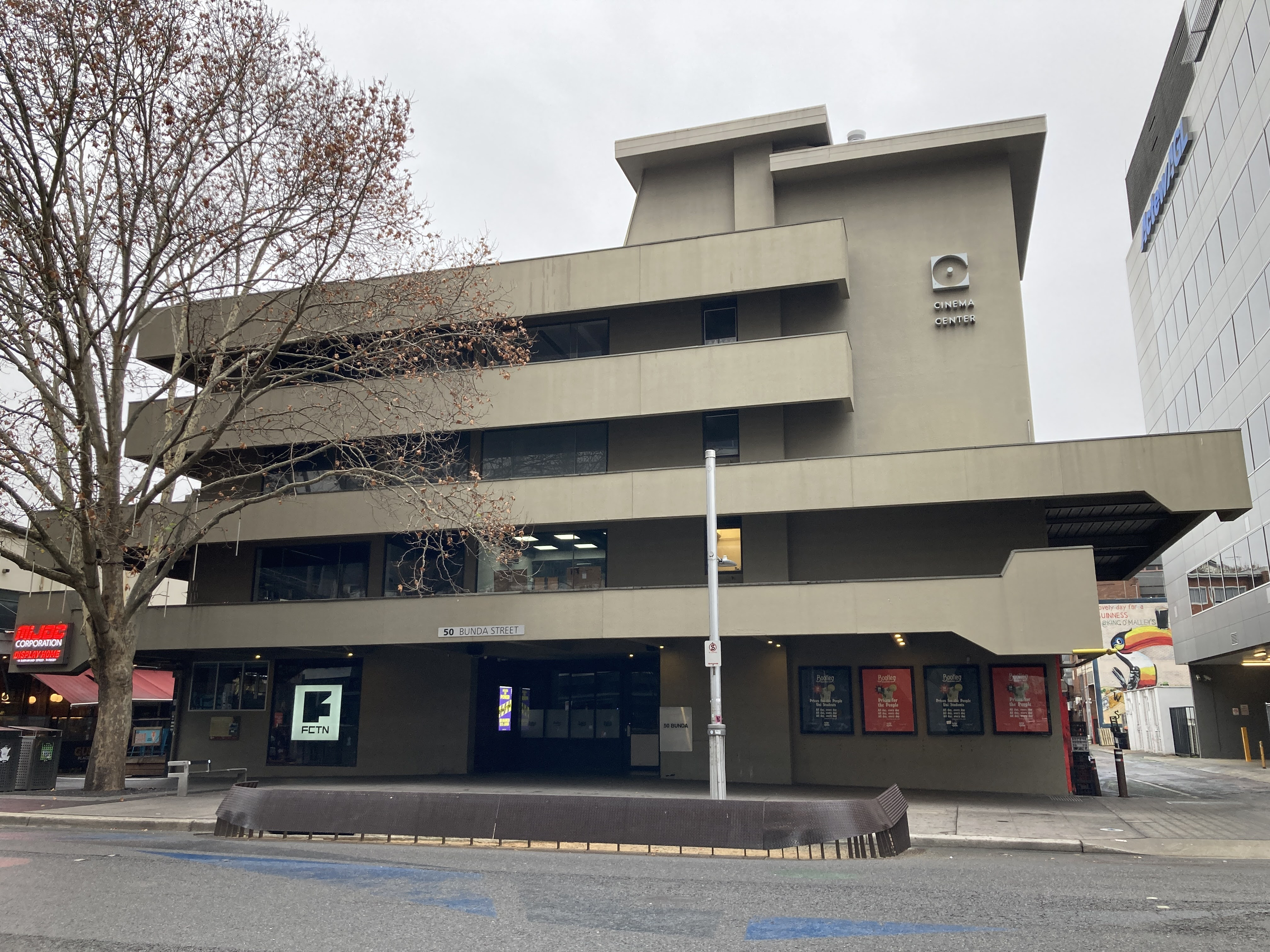
The Cinema Center building

He then contracted Taglietti to build a sophisticated cinema in the heart of Canberra, which became the Center Cinema, with state-of-the-art projection and sound equipment, and the attached Charlie's Restaurant. Taglietti also designed a café and facilities block for Killen's next project, the Sundown drive-in.

He opened

- Canberra's underground (literally) Cinema Centre in October 1966.
- Sundown Drive-in at Narrabundah, later known as Symonston, in March 1969
- Boulevard Twin Cinema in 1973, became Electric Shadows in 1979.
- Nova Cinema (previously "Star") in Young's Arcade, Queanbeyan, in 1972
- Academy Twin (previously "Mandala") in Oxford Street, Paddington

As managing director of Cinema Center Services Pty Ltd, he began importing (especially French) films himself rather than rely on commercial distributors.

He helped further the careers of Richard Ruhfus, Wol Ambrose, Ted Kercher, Mac Kercher, Peter Irving and Andrew Pike.

Killen was an early proponent of a light rail service between Canberra and its northern suburbs.

== Personal ==
Killen married Dinny in 1960, and established a property in the Majura Valley, and in conjunction with Dr Edgar Riek planted with chardonnay, pinot noir, merlot and cabernet sauvignon grapes, as the Mount Majura Vineyard, managed by Dinny Killen. She was also active in Canberra's art scene, as chair of the Australian Decorative and Fine Arts Society. In 1969 they commissioned Taglietti to build them a house on the property, following one for Ross Gibson at Red Hill. The property was sold in 1999.

== Publications ==
- The flickering fortunes of film, history of ACT cinemas, article in Canberra Times
