= Ivan Trayling =

Australian politician (born 1936)

The Honourable Ivan Trayling OAM
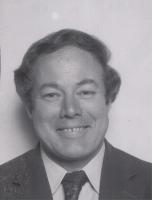

Member of the Victorian Legislative Council
- In office 1972–1982
- Monarch: Elizabeth II
- Preceded by: Jack O'Connell
- Succeeded by: Barry Pullen
- Constituency: Melbourne Province

Personal details
- Born: Ivan Barry Trayling; 1936 (age 89–90) Hobart, Tasmania, Australia
- Party: Labor Party
- Spouse(s): Thelma Gwenneth Oberin (m. 1957) Bernadette Simmons (m. 1977)
- Children: 3
- Relatives: JB Simmons (father-in-law); Braz Anthony Fernandes (grandfather-in-law)

Ivan Barry Trayling OAM (born 1936) is a former Australian politician.

== Early life and family ==
Ivan Trayling was born in 1936 in Hobart, Tasmania, the son of Ronald George Trayling, Chief Clerk of the State Superannuation Board of the State of Tasmania & the state Labor Party auditor, and Gwendoline Florence Iles.

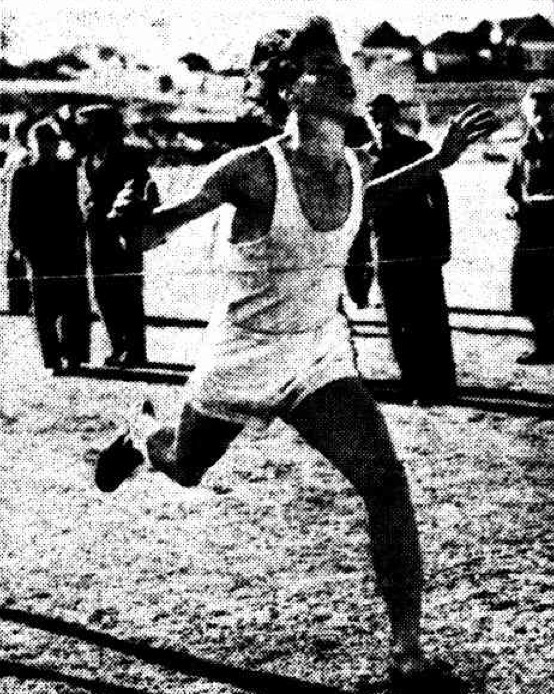
Ivan Trayling winning the 440 yards race

He went to A.G. Ogilve High School in Hobart, Tasmania and was a star athlete. Trayling broke a school record on 25 March 1952 which had stood for 14 years when he won the boys' 880 yards championship at the A. G. Ogilvie High School athletic sports, clipping 2 seconds off the previous record set in 1938. He followed that up the next day with winning the open 100 (in a record 10.1 seconds), 220 and 440 yards, giving him that year's open title. He was in the Australian Army Cadets for 5 years.

In his first marriage, to Thelma Gwenneth Oberin, a descendant of immigrants from Germany, Scotland, Ireland, and England, he had two children, Sue and Richard. In 1977, after his divorce, he married Bernadette Simmons (daughter of CDR JB Simmons and Dr Charlotte Simmons), who was descended from a noble Portuguese family traced back to Braz Fernandes (1791–1865), Knight Commander of the Order of Christ and the first ever Vice Consul of Portugal in Bombay. They had one son, Mark.

He is a graduate of the Australian Department of Defence Industrial Mobilisation Course.

== Political career ==
=== Local government - St Kilda ===
Trayling joined the St. Kilda West Branch of the Labor Party in 1964 and campaigned for the need for a library, a child minding centre, as well as a range of other issues. A 31-year-old Marketing Manager at the time, Trayling became a Councillor for St Kilda in 1967 after defeating the sitting West Ward Councillor, Bill Bush, who had not been opposed before. His campaign was managed by Brian Zouch, a fellow Labor Party member and news editor for the Southern Cross, who made sure that all householders who had agreed to vote for Trayling did so by ticking their names off on the roll on polling day, then sending cars to fetch those who had not appeared so that they could vote as they had promised before voting closed.

There had been community support for the creation of St Kilda Library but prior Councils had been consistently refusing to establish one. The council agreed to reverse their decades-old position when Trayling was elected, seeing the large community support behind his campaign. Trayling headed up a Library Sub-Committee as Chairman in 1969, with the Foundation stone being laid by him in 1972 in his then capacity as Mayor of the City of St Kilda. Although the creation of St Kilda Library is considered his biggest achievement in local government, he also delivered on his other promise of setting up a child minding centre.

Trayling was also involved in the movement for abortion rights. Bill Dye headed the Abortion Law Reform Association, of which Trayling was a committee member. The Abortion Law Reform Association was formed in 1968 to press for law reform, with the more specific aim of securing legislation along the lines of Britain's Abortion Act.

=== State government - Victoria ===
In 1972 Trayling became the Australian Labor Party member for the Legislative Council seat of Melbourne Province, which he held until 1982.

He was at the time the youngest member of the Australian Labor Party in the Legislative Council.

In his inaugural speech to Parliament he highlighted three main points: his concern with the growing differing laws and regulations amongst states such as with roads, censorship, health and workers compensation; certain competition between states were hurting the national interest; and revision of the structure of local government, which he believed had become over-governed and needed downsizing.

From 1973 to 1979 he was Shadow Minister for Local Government. From 1973 to 1976 he was Deputy Chairman of the Osteopathy, Chiropractic and Naturopath committee, looking into the standard of care, extent & necessity of treatments etc. From 1976 to 1982 he was Chairman of the Conservation of Energy Resources and a member of the House Committee.

==== Meetings with heads of state ====
In January 1972, Trayling met with Sweden's Prime Minister Olof Palme in Stockholm to discuss their mutual interest and support of the anti-Vietnam movement and the socialist policies of the day.

On 3 September 1975, Trayling had a private meeting with India's Prime Minister Indira Gandhi in New Delhi, during India's "Emergency" period and discussed India's political situation, demography, trade and so forth.

In 1978 after Sydney's Commonwealth Heads of Government Meeting, India's Prime Minister Morarji Desai visited Melbourne to meet with Sir Robert Menzies, an old friend and Trayling, on the recommendation of Vadilal Dagli. Dagli was the editor of Commerce magazine in India and interested in an article on the views of India's future.

Trayling retired from politics in 1982.

== Honours ==
- Awarded the Queen Elizabeth II Silver Jubilee Medal in 1977.
- In August 1982 Fred Grimwade M.L.C., President of the Legislative Council, informed Ivan Trayling in writing that, "I have much pleasure in informing you that advice has been received that Her Majesty The Queen has been graciously pleased to approve the recommendation that you retain the title of "The Honourable" for life."
- Awarded the Medal of the Order of Australia for "service to the people and Parliament of Victoria" in the Queen's Birthday Honours 2016.

== Life after politics ==
After his political career he became Marketing Manager for Plessey Australia (1982–84), Managing Director for Ericsson Defence Systems (1985–93) and Managing Director of Bernmark Pty Ltd (1994 to retiring in 2004).

From 2003 he took an interest in horse racing in India. His wife Bernadette enjoyed successes with her horses, including:

AQUILO Won the Nanoli Stud Pune Derby, 2005 and came 5th in the Indian Derby.

PICASSO Won the Prive Equine Excellence Award for Leading Juvenile 2010–11, Won the Poonawalla Breeders Multimillion (gr.1) 2010 and came second in the 2011 Two Thousand Guineas.

He also started getting involved with horses in Australia and New Zealand from 2012 onwards.

Victorian Legislative Council
| Preceded by Jack O'Connell | Member for Melbourne Province; 1972–1982; Served alongside: Jack Walton; Barry Jones; Derek Amos | Succeeded by Barry Pullen |
Political offices
| Preceded by | Shadow Minister for Local Government; 1973–1979 | Succeeded by |
Civic offices
| Preceded by G.A. Ray Manning | Mayor of the City of St Kilda; 1972–1973 | Succeeded by T.P. Tierney |
| Preceded by Bill Bush | Councillor (West Ward) of the City of St Kilda; 1967–1973 | Succeeded by A.E. Bawden |
