= William Wilson Killen =

Australian politician

William Killen
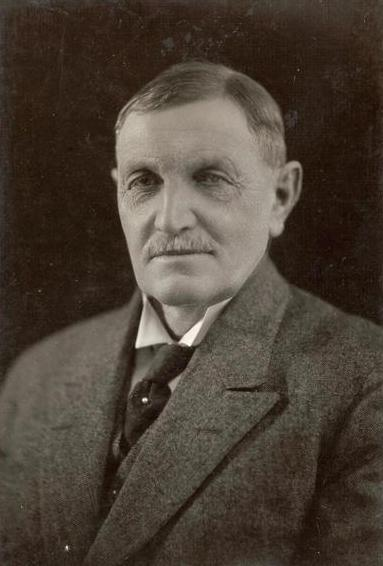

Member of the Australian Parliament for Riverina
- In office 16 December 1922 – 27 November 1931
- Preceded by: John Chanter
- Succeeded by: Horace Nock

Personal details
- Born: 1860 Ireland
- Died: 20 February 1939 (aged 78–79)
- Party: Australian Country Party
- Occupation: Farmer

William Wilson Killen (1860 – 20 February 1939) was an Australian politician.

Killen was born and educated in County Antrim, Ireland and migrated to Australia with his family in 1876. His father Edward acquired significant pastoral interests, and Killen initially worked on his father's property, "Elsinor", then managed the "Pirillie" property near Bourke. He then acquired an interest in the "Bull Plain" property near Corowa, founding a Merino stud, and purchased the "Merribee" property near Barellan in 1908, where he resided for many years thereafter.

In the 1900s Killen was secretary of a branch of the Peace and Humanity Society, which opposed Australia's involvement in the Boer War, when British troops were "depriving a brave and free people ... of their liberty and independence", indulging in "farm burning, dam-cutting, and general destruction", and "barbarous treatment of women and children ... in direct violation of the rules of warfare, as laid down by the Hague Conference".

He was a co-founder of the Farmers' and Settlers' Association and after many years of involvement was its president from 1920 to 1922. He was also president of the Murrumbidgee Shire, a Yanko Shire councillor, vice-president of the Riverina New State League, a member of the councils of the Graziers' Association and Stockowners' Association and a member of the Australian Meat Council, as well as his local pastures protection board. He was an unsuccessful Progressive Party candidate at the 1920 state election. In 1922 he was elected to the Australian House of Representatives as a member of the Country Party, defeating Nationalist MP John Chanter for the seat of Riverina. In 1925, while a federal MP, he was the official representative of the Riverina Movement at the 1925 NSW Royal Commission into the New State movements. Killen held Riverina until his retirement in 1931, having had a heart attack in 1929 and struggled with health issues during his final term.

Killen returned to farming after his retirement from politics and also continued a long-running role as a director of the Farmers' and Graziers' Co-operative Grain Insurance and Agency Co. Ltd. He retired to Sydney in his final years. He died at his home in Manly in 1939 after having been ill for several months, and was buried at Rookwood Cemetery.

He married Marion Young (died 1926), daughter of Victorian colonial MP Charles Young; they had three sons and one daughter: Harold Charles Killen (1894–1956), Edward Cecil Lyle Killen (1896–1965), William Bertram Sydney Killen (1900–1966), Marion Alice Killen (1898–1972). Killen's grandson, David Leitch, was a member of the New South Wales Legislative Assembly from 1973 to 1978.

Killen's brother Edward Killen (c. 1864–1933) was a well-known pastoralist, having purchased Nimagee, Moonagee, Gerar and Wee Jasper stations. He was associated with Graziers' Association of NSW, NSW Sheep Breeders' Association and Pastoralists' Protection Association of NSW. His children included pastoralists Eric Lyle Killen (1892–1955) and Geoffrey Lyle Killen (1899–1975).

== See also ==
E. L. Killen includes some family details

Parliament of Australia
Preceded by John Chanter	Member for Riverina; 1922–1931	Succeeded by Horace Nock
