= Joe Langtry =

Australian politician

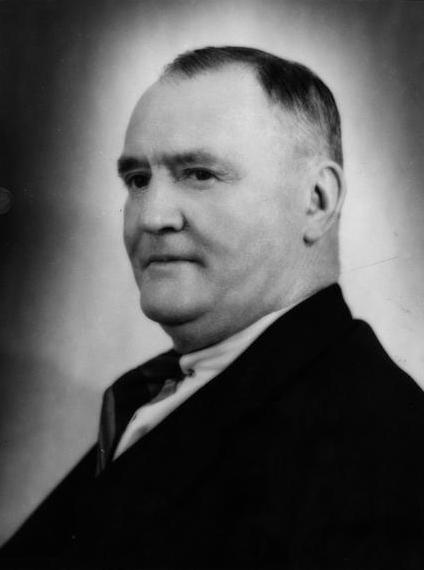

Member of the Australian Parliament for Riverina
- In office 21 September 1940 – 10 December 1949
- Preceded by: Horace Nock
- Succeeded by: Hugh Roberton

Personal details
- Born: Joseph Ignatius Langtry; 2 September 1880 Kyabram, Victoria
- Died: 30 April 1951 (aged 70) Griffith, New South Wales, Australia
- Party: Australian Labor Party
- Occupation: Wheat farmer, publican

Joseph Ignatius Langtry (2 September 1880 – 30 April 1951) was an Australian politician. Born in Kyabram, Victoria, he received a primary education before becoming a teamster. He moved to Barellan in New South Wales and became a wheatfarmer and publican. In 1940, he was the Labor candidate for the Australian House of Representatives seat of Riverina; he was successful in this, defeating Country Party member Horace Nock. He held the seat until 1949, when he was defeated by Country candidate Hugh Roberton. Langtry died in 1951 in Griffith.

Parliament of Australia
Preceded by Horace Nock	Member for Riverina; 1940–1949	Succeeded by Hugh Roberton
