= 1965 Riverina by-election =

Australian federal by-election

A by-election was held for the Australian House of Representatives seat of Riverina on 27 February 1965. This was triggered by the resignation of Country Party MP Hugh Roberton.

The by-election was won by Country Party candidate Bill Armstrong.

== Results ==
Riverina by-election, 1965
| Party | Candidate | Votes | % | ±% |
|---|---|---|---|---|
| Country | Bill Armstrong | 21,371 | 56.3 | +4.6 |
| Labor | Jack Ward | 16,561 | 43.7 | +2.1 |
| Total formal votes | | 37,932 | 98.8 | |
| Informal votes | | 455 | 1.2 | |
| Turnout | | 38,387 | 87.5 | |
| Country hold | | Swing | −1.0 | |
