= John Chanter =

Australian politician

The Honourable John Chanter
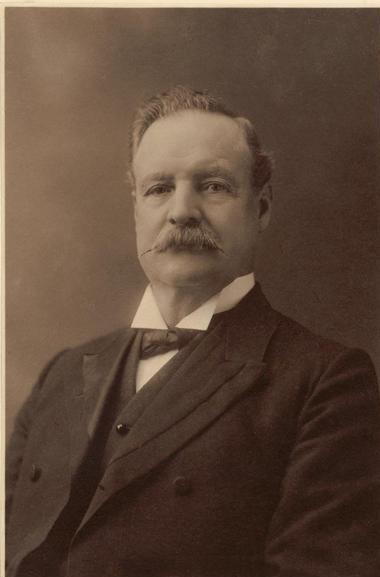

Member of the Australian Parliament for Riverina
- In office 29 March 1901 – 16 December 1903
- Preceded by: New seat
- Succeeded by: Robert Blackwood
- In office 18 May 1904 – 31 May 1913
- Preceded by: Robert Blackwood
- Succeeded by: Franc Falkiner
- In office 5 September 1914 – 16 December 1922
- Preceded by: Franc Falkiner
- Succeeded by: William Killen

Personal details
- Born: 11 February 1845 Adelaide, South Australia
- Died: 9 March 1931 (aged 86) Caulfield, Victoria
- Party: Protectionist (1901–09); Labor (1909–17); Nationalist (1917–22)
- Occupation: Farmer

John Moore Chanter (11 February 1845 – 9 March 1931) was an Australian politician, farmer and commission agent. He was a member of the Protectionist Party, as well as the Australian Labor Party and the Nationalist Party of Australia.

== Early life ==
Chanter was born in Adelaide, South Australia, and was the son of John Chanter and Elizabeth née Moore. He was educated at the Albert House Academy and the Collegiate School of St Peter in Adelaide, as well as at the Model Training Institution when his family relocated to Melbourne in 1856. Chanter was a storekeeper and farmer and in 1878, he became the first secretary of the Victorian Farmers' Union.

In 1881 he moved to Moama, New South Wales, as an auctioneer and commission agent where he was prominent in establishing the Australian Natives' Association in New South Wales, and became its first president in 1900.

== Colonial politics ==
Chanter's political career began in 1885 when he was elected to the New South Wales Legislative Assembly as the Member for Murray. He served the electorate for the three consecutive terms before becoming the Member for Deniliquin in 1894. He held the position of Secretary for Mines in the second Dibbs Ministry from 17 January 1889 to 7 March 1889.

== Federal politics ==
Chanter was noted for his democratic views, and was a supporter of Edmund Barton in the lead-up to the Federation of Australia. In 1901 he was elected to the seat of Riverina in the first Australian Parliament, as a member of the Protectionist Party. He was subsequently elected as the inaugural chairman of committees.

Chanter lost Riverina in 1903 to the Free Trade Party candidate Robert Blackwood, but regained it in the 1904 by-election after a petition to the High Court. Chanter opposed the Fusion of 1909, and (together with Sir William Lyne) he did not join the Commonwealth Liberal Party. Chanter instead joined the Labor Party, declaring his beliefs as closer to Labor than the Commonwealth Liberals. He again lost Riverina to Franc Falkiner, the Commonwealth Liberal Party candidate in the 1913 election, but he regained the seat for Labor in 1914. He subsequently returned as chairman of committees, which position he held until 1922. His cumulative service of over 10 years remained a record for the position until surpassed by Philip Lucock in 1971.

As a result of the dispute over conscription in 1916, Chanter left the Labor Party and, together with several other former Labor members, as well as the Commonwealth Liberal Party, formed the Nationalist Party—thus reuniting him with several of his former Protectionist colleagues. He retained Riverina until the 1922 election, when he was defeated by William Killen, candidate for the new Country Party. He was the first Member of the House of Representatives to have been defeated three times in the same seat. He was praised as a local member and, though he rarely contributed to political debate, his views were always held strongly.

== Personal life ==
Chanter married Mary Ann Clark in 1863, and although she died in 1920, she was survived by six sons and four daughters. After his departure from politics, Chanter retired to Caulfield, Victoria, where he died in 1931, and was buried in Brighton Cemetery. One of his sons, John Courtenay Chanter (1881–1962), served in World War I and later became a member of the New South Wales Legislative Assembly, representing the division of Lachlan for the Labor Party.

New South Wales Legislative Assembly
Preceded by Alexander Wilson	Member for Murray; 1885–1894; Served alongside: Barbour	Succeeded by James Hayes
Preceded by New seat	Member for Deniliquin; 1894–1901	Succeeded by Joseph Evans
Parliament of Australia
New division	Member for Riverina; 1901–1903	Succeeded by Robert Blackwood
Preceded by Robert Blackwood	Member for Riverina; 1904–1913	Succeeded by Franc Falkiner
Preceded by Franc Falkiner	Member for Riverina; 1914–1922	Succeeded by William Killen
