= Bill Armstrong (Australian politician) =

Australian politician (1909–1982)

Bill Armstrong OBE, MC
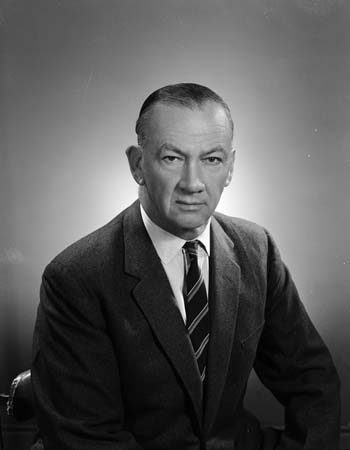

Member of the Australian Parliament for Riverina
- In office 27 February 1965 – 25 October 1969
- Preceded by: Hugh Roberton
- Succeeded by: Al Grassby

Personal details
- Born: 1 July 1909 Deniliquin, New South Wales, Australia
- Died: 22 February 1982 (aged 72)
- Party: Australian Country Party
- Occupation: Farmer

Adam Alexander "Bill" Armstrong OBE MC (1 July 1909 – 22 February 1982) was an Australian politician. Born in Deniliquin, New South Wales, he was a grazier before serving in the military 1939–45 (during World War II). Subsequently, he became involved in local politics, serving on Conargo Shire Council. In 1965 he was elected to the Australian House of Representatives in the by-election for the seat of Riverina that followed the resignation of Hugh Roberton; Armstrong was a member of the Country Party. He held the seat until 1969, when he was defeated by Labor's Al Grassby. Armstrong died in 1982.

Parliament of Australia
Preceded by Hugh Roberton	Member for Riverina; 1965–1969	Succeeded by Al Grassby
