= Hugh Roberton (politician) =

Australian politician

The Honourable Hugh Roberton
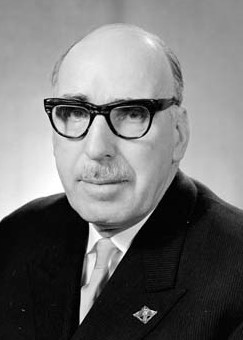
- Roberton in 1963

Minister for Social Services
- In office 28 February 1956 – 21 January 1965
- Prime Minister: Robert Menzies
- Preceded by: William McMahon
- Succeeded by: Reginald Swartz

Member of the Australian Parliament for Riverina
- In office 10 December 1949 – 21 January 1965
- Preceded by: Joe Langtry
- Succeeded by: Bill Armstrong

Personal details
- Born: 18 December 1900 Glasgow, Scotland
- Died: 13 March 1987 (aged 86) Canberra, Australia
- Party: Country
- Spouses: Marjorie Wyllie (m. 1926–1970) Eileen McLeod (m. 1972)
- Relations: Sir Hugh Roberton (father)
- Children: 1
- Occupation: Farmer, writer

Hugh Stevenson Roberton (18 December 1900 – 13 March 1987) was an Australian politician, farmer and journalist. A member of the Country Party, he served as Minister for Social Services in the Menzies government from 1956 to 1965. He later served as Ambassador to Ireland from 1965 to 1967.

== Early life ==
Roberton was born on 18 December 1900 in Glasgow, Scotland. He was the fourth of six children born to Joan (née McGillivray) and Hugh Stevenson Roberton. His father, an undertaker by profession, was a prominent composer and was eventually knighted for his services to music.

Roberton left school at a young age and worked in agriculture, undertaking further study at the West of Scotland Agricultural College. He was conscripted into the British Army in May 1918 and attached to the Queen's Own Cameron Highlanders, being discharged on the conclusion of World War I. After a brief period in South Africa, Roberton immigrated to Australia in 1922, settling in the Riverina, and began working as a sharefarmer growing wheat for the Scottish Australian Investment Company Limited. He later leased 718 acres (291 ha) of land from the company at Murrulebale Station near Old Junee, which he eventually purchased in 1948.

Roberton enlisted in the Australian Imperial Force in April 1942, claiming a younger age. He trained as a gunner and was stationed in Mandatory Palestine for three months on clerical duties. He was later returned to Australia and served with the 2/3rd Anti-Tank Regiment until his discharge in December 1944.

== Journalism ==
In 1930, Roberton began writing a weekly column for the Coolamon-Ganmain Farmers' Review under the pen name "Peter Snodgrass". His columns opposed Charles Hardy's Riverina Movement which sought the secession of Riverina from New South Wales. He began writing for The Land in 1932, where he was an influential writer on agricultural policy. In 1939 he proposed the so-called "Roberton Scheme" for the permanent stabilisation of wheat prices via a quota, a version of which was adopted by the federal government in 1942. His book Now Blame the Farmer was published by Angus & Robertson in 1945 and included various proposals for government land and agricultural policy.

== Politics ==
In 1932, Roberton was elected leader of the Marrar branch of the United Country Movement, which subsequently merged into the Country Party. He served on the executive of the Farmers' and Settlers' Association of New South Wales from 1932 to 1942 and as president from 1946 to 1949. He stood unsuccessfully for the New South Wales Legislative Assembly seat of Temora at the 1938 state election and was elected to the Country Party's state council in the same year.

At the 1940 federal election, Roberton was one of two candidates endorsed by the Country Party in the seat of Riverina, along with the incumbent MP Horace Nock. They were defeated by the Australian Labor Party (ALP) candidate Joe Langtry. Roberton reprised his candidacy against Langtry at the 1946 election, where he was narrowly defeated, before winning Riverina on his third attempt as the Coalition won a landslide victory at the 1949 election.

Roberton was appointed Minister for Social Services in the Menzies government on 28 February 1956. He remained as minister for nearly nine years, which as of 2021 represented the longest period of service in the social services portfolio and equivalents. In 1959, Roberton successfully proposed to cabinet that social security legislation be amended to remove provisions discriminating against Indigenous Australians, including a requirement that Indigenous people obtain an exemption from state protection regimes before they could receive federal government benefits.

Roberton was an unsuccessful candidate for the Country Party's deputy leadership in 1963, losing to Charles Adermann after the retirement of Charles Davidson. He was elevated to cabinet in December 1964, but three weeks later resigned in order to accept appointment to an ambassadorship. The Sydney Morning Herald reported in January 1965 that his time in the ministry had been "marked by conscientious effort rather than spectacular achievement".

== Later life ==
In January 1965, Roberton was announced as Australia's first Ambassador to Ireland. Although the countries had had diplomatic relations for decades, Australian appointment of a diplomat with full ambassadorial rank had been delayed due to a dispute over the name of the Irish state and its implied claims to Northern Ireland.

Roberton served as ambassador until 1968 and then returned to Australia, retiring to Wagga Wagga. He died in Canberra on 13 March 1987, aged 86. He was survived by his wife, Eileen, and a daughter.

== Notes ==
Political offices
Preceded by William McMahon	Minister for Social Services; 1956–1965	Succeeded by Reginald Swartz
Parliament of Australia
Preceded by Joe Langtry	Member for Riverina; 1949–1965	Succeeded by Bill Armstrong
Diplomatic posts
Preceded by R.H. Gilman	Australian Ambassador to Ireland; 1965–1967	Succeeded by K.I. Gates as Chargé d'affaires
