= List of post-nominal letters (Portugal) =

Post-nominal letters in Portugal include:

ANCIENT MILITARY ORDERS
Order	Office	Post-nominal
Military Order of the Tower and Sword; Ordem Militar da Torre e Espada, do Valor, Lealdade e Mérito	Grand Collar	GColTE
Military Order of the Tower and Sword; Ordem Militar da Torre e Espada, do Valor, Lealdade e Mérito	Grand Cross	GCTE
Military Order of the Tower and Sword; Ordem Militar da Torre e Espada, do Valor, Lealdade e Mérito	Grand Officer	GOTE
Military Order of the Tower and Sword; Ordem Militar da Torre e Espada, do Valor, Lealdade e Mérito	Commander	ComTE
Military Order of the Tower and Sword; Ordem Militar da Torre e Espada, do Valor, Lealdade e Mérito	Officer	OTE
Military Order of the Tower and Sword; Ordem Militar da Torre e Espada, do Valor, Lealdade e Mérito	Knight or Dame	CvTE / DmTE
Military Order of Christ; Ordem Militar de Cristo	Grand Collar	GColC
Military Order of Christ; Ordem Militar de Cristo	Grand Cross	GCC
Military Order of Christ; Ordem Militar de Cristo	Grand Officer	GOC
Military Order of Christ; Ordem Militar de Cristo	Commander	ComC
Military Order of Christ; Ordem Militar de Cristo	Officer	OC
Military Order of Christ; Ordem Militar de Cristo	Knight or Dame	CvC / DmC
Military Order of Aviz; Ordem Militar de Avis	Grand Collar	GColA
Military Order of Aviz; Ordem Militar de Avis	Grand Cross	GCA
Military Order of Aviz; Ordem Militar de Avis	Grand Officer	GOA
Military Order of Aviz; Ordem Militar de Avis	Commander	ComA
Military Order of Aviz; Ordem Militar de Avis	Officer	OA
Military Order of Aviz; Ordem Militar de Avis	Knight or Dame	CvA / DmA
Military Order of Saint James of the Sword; Ordem Militar de Sant'Iago da Espada	Grand Collar	GColSE
Military Order of Saint James of the Sword; Ordem Militar de Sant'Iago da Espada	Grand Cross	GCSE
Military Order of Saint James of the Sword; Ordem Militar de Sant'Iago da Espada	Grand Officer	GOSE
Military Order of Saint James of the Sword; Ordem Militar de Sant'Iago da Espada	Commander	ComSE
Military Order of Saint James of the Sword; Ordem Militar de Sant'Iago da Espada	Officer	OSE
Military Order of Saint James of the Sword; Ordem Militar de Sant'Iago da Espada	Knight or Dame	CvSE / DmSE
NATIONAL ORDERS
Order	Office	Post-nominal
Order of Prince Henry; Ordem do Infante Dom Henrique	Grand Collar	GColIH
Order of Prince Henry; Ordem do Infante Dom Henrique	Grand Cross	GCIH
Order of Prince Henry; Ordem do Infante Dom Henrique	Grand Officer	GOIH
Order of Prince Henry; Ordem do Infante Dom Henrique	Commander	ComIH
Order of Prince Henry; Ordem do Infante Dom Henrique	Officer	OIH
Order of Prince Henry; Ordem do Infante Dom Henrique	Knight or Dame	CvIH / DmIH
Order of Liberty; Ordem da Liberdade	Grand Collar	GColL
Order of Liberty; Ordem da Liberdade	Grand Cross	GCL
Order of Liberty; Ordem da Liberdade	Grand Officer	GOL
Order of Liberty; Ordem da Liberdade	Commander	ComL
Order of Liberty; Ordem da Liberdade	Officer	OL
Order of Liberty; Ordem da Liberdade	Knight or Dame	CvL / DmL
Order of Camões; Ordem de Camões	Grand Collar	GColCa
Order of Camões; Ordem de Camões	Grand Cross	GCCa
Order of Camões; Ordem de Camões	Grand Officer	GOCa
Order of Camões; Ordem de Camões	Commander	ComCa
Order of Camões; Ordem de Camões	Officer	OCa
Order of Camões; Ordem de Camões	Knight or Dame	CvCa / DmCa
ORDERS OF MERIT
Order	Office	Post-nominal
Order of Merit; Ordem do Mérito	Grand Cross	GCM
Order of Merit; Ordem do Mérito	Grand Officer	GOM
Order of Merit; Ordem do Mérito	Commander	ComM
Order of Merit; Ordem do Mérito	Officer	OM
Order of Merit; Ordem do Mérito	Knight or Dame	CvM / DmM
Order of Public Instruction; Ordem da Instrução Pública	Grand Cross	GCIP
Order of Public Instruction; Ordem da Instrução Pública	Grand Officer	GOIP
Order of Public Instruction; Ordem da Instrução Pública	Commander	ComIP
Order of Public Instruction; Ordem da Instrução Pública	Officer	OIP
Order of Public Instruction; Ordem da Instrução Pública	Knight or Dame	CvIP / DmIP
Order of Entrepreneurial Merit - Classes of Agricultural Merit Ordem do Mérito Empresarial – Classe do Mérito Agrícola	Grand Cross	GCMA
Order of Entrepreneurial Merit - Classes of Agricultural Merit Ordem do Mérito Empresarial – Classe do Mérito Agrícola	Grand Officer	GOMA
Order of Entrepreneurial Merit - Classes of Agricultural Merit Ordem do Mérito Empresarial – Classe do Mérito Agrícola	Commander	ComMA
Order of Entrepreneurial Merit - Classes of Agricultural Merit Ordem do Mérito Empresarial – Classe do Mérito Agrícola	Officer	OMA
Order of Entrepreneurial Merit - Classes of Agricultural Merit Ordem do Mérito Empresarial – Classe do Mérito Agrícola	Knight or Dame	CvMA / DmMA
Order of Entrepreneurial Merit - Classes of Commercial Merit Ordem do Mérito Empresarial – Classe do Mérito Comercial	Grand Cross	GCMC
Order of Entrepreneurial Merit - Classes of Commercial Merit Ordem do Mérito Empresarial – Classe do Mérito Comercial	Grand Officer	GOMC
Order of Entrepreneurial Merit - Classes of Commercial Merit Ordem do Mérito Empresarial – Classe do Mérito Comercial	Commander	ComMC
Order of Entrepreneurial Merit - Classes of Commercial Merit Ordem do Mérito Empresarial – Classe do Mérito Comercial	Officer	OMC
Order of Entrepreneurial Merit - Classes of Commercial Merit Ordem do Mérito Empresarial – Classe do Mérito Comercial	Knight or Dame	CvMC / DmMC
Order of Entrepreneurial Merit - Classes of Industrial Merit Ordem do Mérito Empresarial – Classe do Mérito Industrial	Grand Cross	GCMI
Order of Entrepreneurial Merit - Classes of Industrial Merit Ordem do Mérito Empresarial – Classe do Mérito Industrial	Grand Officer	GOMI
Order of Entrepreneurial Merit - Classes of Industrial Merit Ordem do Mérito Empresarial – Classe do Mérito Industrial	Commander	ComMI
Order of Entrepreneurial Merit - Classes of Industrial Merit Ordem do Mérito Empresarial – Classe do Mérito Industrial	Officer	OMI
Order of Entrepreneurial Merit - Classes of Industrial Merit Ordem do Mérito Empresarial – Classe do Mérito Industrial	Knight or Dame	CvMI / DmMI
