= Robert Blackwood (Australian politician) =

Australian politician, businessman and pastoralist (1861–1940)

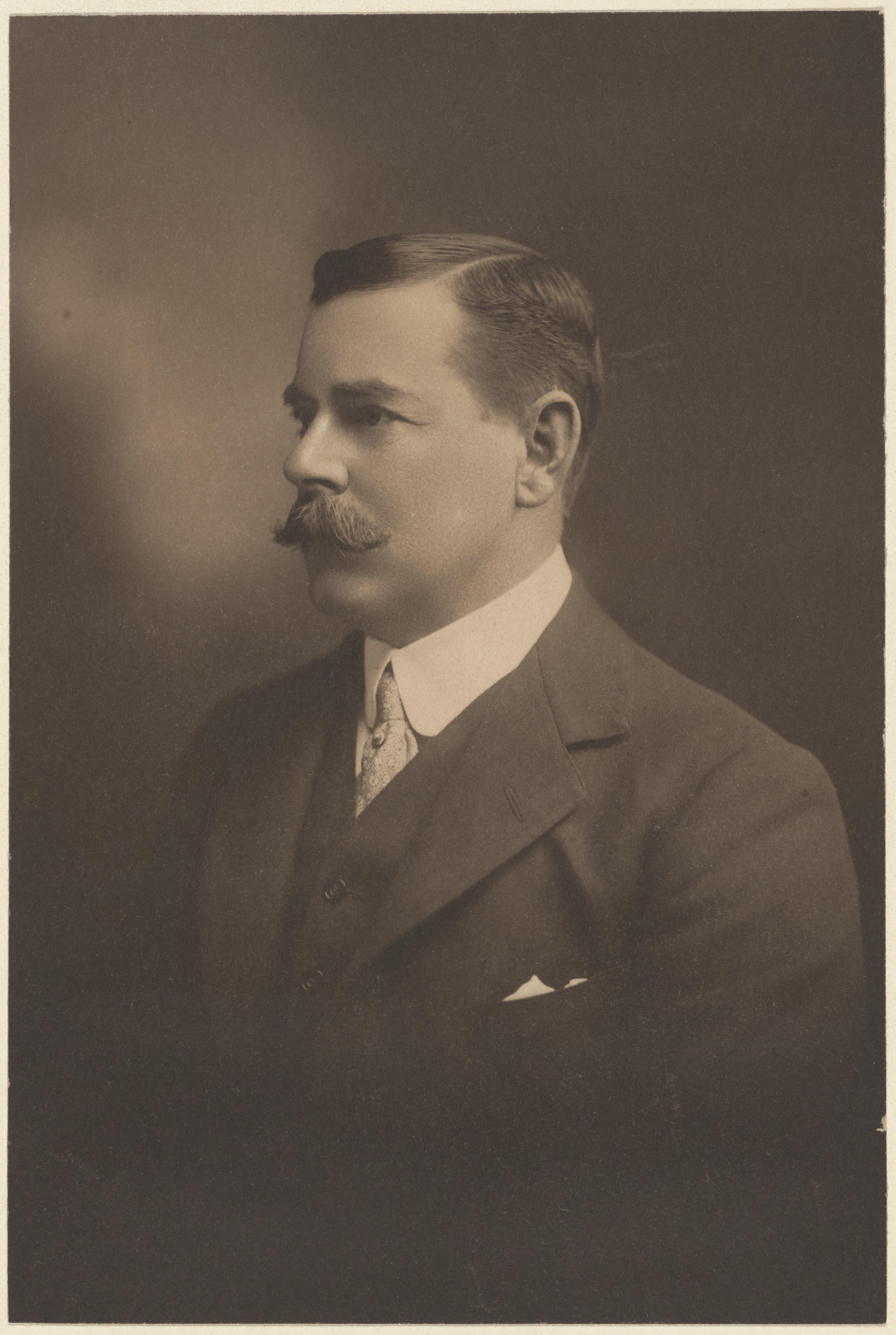

Member of the Australian Parliament for Riverina
- In office 16 December 1903 – 13 April 1904
- Preceded by: John Chanter
- Succeeded by: John Chanter

Personal details
- Born: 24 June 1861 Crowlands, Victoria
- Died: 22 September 1940 (aged 79) St Kilda, Victoria
- Party: Free Trade Party
- Spouse: Constance Ferrier Mailton
- Occupation: Farmer, business owner

Robert Officer Blackwood (24 June 1861 – 22 September 1940) was an Australian politician, businessman and pastoralist. He was briefly a member of the Australian House of Representatives for the Division of Riverina.

Blackwood was born in 1861 at Crowlands in Victoria, the son of Richard Blackwood (d. 1881) and Isabella, née Officer. He attended Melbourne Church of England Grammar School (1878–79), where he gained a reputation as an athlete. He was admitted to Trinity Hall, Cambridge in 1882, where he began boxing – he later became the runner-up in the amateur light-weight boxing championship in England. He returned to Australia in 1889, taking over his father's property in partnership with his brothers.

An active community member around Deniliquin, Blackwood was a member of the Pastoralists' Association of Victoria and Southern Riverina. A supporter of Sir George Reid, he was elected to the House of Representatives for Riverina in New South Wales in 1903 by only five votes, representing the Free Trade Party. On petition by the former member, John Chanter, however, the result was declared void on the grounds of electoral irregularities. Blackwood, who lost the subsequent by-election, was cleared of all charges but never stood for parliament again.

Blackwood continued to be active in rural affairs, becoming vice-president of the Pastoralists' Union of Southern Riverina in 1906. He was president of the Conargo Shire in 1907, and represented many companies; he became chairman of Dalgety & Co. and Australian Farms Ltd, and president of the Victorian Employers' Association and the Registered Clubs' Association of Victoria from 1916 to 1930. He also became vice-president of the Royal Agricultural Society from 1920 to 1938.

Blackwood married Constance Ferrier Mailton on 23 July 1895 at St Paul's Cathedral, Melbourne. Despite his deteriorating health he maintained contact with his business affairs until his death on 22 September 1940 at St Kilda; he was survived by his wife. He had no children.

Parliament of Australia
Preceded by John Chanter	Member for Riverina; 1903–1904	Succeeded by John Chanter
