= Division of Riverina =

Australian federal electoral division

Coordinates: 34.427°S 146.700°E

Riverina Australian House of Representatives Division
- Interactive map of electorate boundaries from the 2025 federal election
- Dates current: 1901–1984, 1993–present
- MP: Michael McCormack
- Party: Nationals
- Namesake: Riverina
- Electors: 128,630 (2025)
- Area: 52,410 km^{2} (20,235.6 sq mi)
- Demographic: Rural
Electorates around Riverina:
Parkes	Calare	Whitlam; Eden-Monaro
Farrer	Riverina	Bean (ACT); Fenner (ACT)
Farrer	Indi (Vic)	Eden-Monaro; Gippsland (Vic)

The Division of Riverina (/rɪvəriːnə/) is an Australian electoral division in the state of New South Wales. It is located in southwest New South Wales and includes the city of Wagga Wagga.

Since 2010, it has been represented by Michael McCormack, former Deputy Prime Minister and leader of the National Party of Australia from 2018 to 2021.

== Geography ==
The division is located in southwest New South Wales, generally in the Murrumbidgee River valley. Part of its eastern border from the border with the Australian Capital Territory. It includes the local government areas of Wagga Wagga, Lockhart Shire, Snowy Valleys, Cootamundra–Gundagai, Junee Shire, Coolamon Shire, Temora Shire, Hilltops, Weddin Shire, Cowra Shire, Upper Lachlan Shire and Yass Valley. It includes the city of Wagga Wagga, as well as the towns of Cowra, Junee, Cootamundra, Temora, West Wyalong, Young, Tumut, Gundagai and Yass. The division covers a primarily agricultural, rural area with many small towns. Parts of the Hume Highway, the Sturt Highway, the Newell Highway, the Olympic Highway, the Mid-Western Highway and the Snowy Mountains Highway run through the division.

Since 1984, federal electoral division boundaries in Australia have been determined at redistributions by a redistribution committee appointed by the Australian Electoral Commission. Redistributions occur for the boundaries of divisions in a particular state, and they occur every seven years, or sooner if a state's representation entitlement changes or when divisions of a state are malapportioned.

== History ==
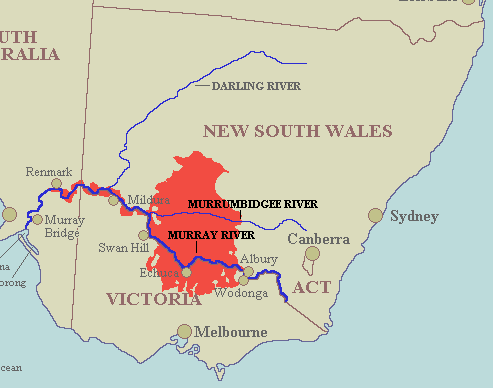
The region of Riverina, the division's namesake

The division was proclaimed in 1900, and was one of the original 65 divisions to be contested at the first federal election. It was abolished between 1984 and 1993, so it has not been contested at every federal election. The division was named after the Riverina region in which it is located, though its modern borders do not correspond exactly with the Riverina region.

Between 1901 and 1906, it covered the south-west corner of the state, the MacCabe Corner. In 1906, the division was shifted eastwards to include about half of the abolished Division of Bland.

The seats first incarnation tilted toward the Nationals' predecessor, the Country Party, for much of its history, but it was occasionally taken by Labor during high-tide elections. Between 1969 and 1974, when it included the Murrumbidgee Irrigation Area (later part of Farrer), it was held by Al Grassby, Minister for Immigration in the Whitlam government. It was fairly marginal for most of the 1970s and early 1980s, when it included the strongly pro-Labor mining towns of Broken Hill and Cobar in the Far West of the state, gained from the abolished division of Darling in 1977. Between 1977 and 1984, Riverina covered the north-west and south-west corners of the state, the Cameron Corner and the MacCabe Corner respectively. In the 1984 redistribution, the division was abolished and replaced by Riverina-Darling. As of 2026, the Far West areas are now covered by Division of Parkes.

Since its re-creation in 1993, it has been a safe Nationals seat. At the time, it covered Wagga Wagga and Griffith, but lost Griffith to Farrer in 2016. It also gained Parkes and Forbes. In the 2024 redistribution, it lost these areas and West Wyalong to the Division of Parkes but also gained Tumut, Yass, Tumbarumba and Crookwell from the divisions of Eden-Monaro and Hume.

The current Member for Riverina, since the 2010 federal election, is Michael McCormack, former Deputy Prime Minister and leader of the National Party of Australia from 2018 to 2021.

== Members ==
=== First incarnation (1901–1984) ===
Image	Member	Party	Term	Notes
	John Chanter (1845–1931)	Protectionist	29 March 1901 – 16 December 1903	Previously held the New South Wales Legislative Assembly seat of Deniliquin. Lost seat
	Robert Blackwood (1861–1940)	Free Trade	16 December 1903 – 13 April 1904	1903 election results declared void. Lost seat in subsequent by-election
	John Chanter (1845–1931)	Protectionist	18 May 1904 – 26 May 1909	Lost seat
	John Chanter (1845–1931)	Labor	26 May 1909 – 31 May 1913	Lost seat
	Franc Falkiner (1867–1929)	Liberal	31 May 1913 – 5 September 1914	Lost seat. Later elected to the Division of Hume in 1917
	John Chanter (1845–1931)	Labor	5 September 1914 – 14 November 1916	Lost seat
	John Chanter (1845–1931)	National Labor	14 November 1916 – 17 February 1917	Lost seat
	John Chanter (1845–1931)	Nationalist	17 February 1917 – 16 December 1922	Lost seat
	William Killen (1860–1939)	Country	16 December 1922 – 27 November 1931	Retired
	Horace Nock (1879–1958)	Country	19 December 1931 – 21 September 1940	Lost seat
	Joe Langtry (1880–1951)	Labor	21 September 1940 – 10 December 1949	Lost seat
	Hugh Roberton (1900–1987)	Country	10 December 1949 – 21 January 1965	Served as minister under Menzies. Resigned to become Australian Ambassador to Ireland
	Bill Armstrong (1909–1982)	Country	27 February 1965 – 25 October 1969	Lost seat
	Al Grassby (1926–2005)	Labor	25 October 1969 – 18 May 1974	Served as minister under Whitlam. Lost seat
	John Sullivan (1929–)	Country	18 May 1974 – 2 May 1975	Lost seat. Later elected to the New South Wales Legislative Assembly seat of Sturt in 1981
	John Sullivan (1929–)	National Country	2 May 1975 – 10 December 1977	Lost seat. Later elected to the New South Wales Legislative Assembly seat of Sturt in 1981
	John FitzPatrick (1915–1997)	Labor	10 December 1977 – 19 September 1980	Previously held the Division of Darling. Retired
	Noel Hicks (1940–)	National Country	18 October 1980 – 16 October 1982	Transferred to the Division of Riverina-Darling after Riverina was abolished in 1984
	Noel Hicks (1940–)	Nationals	16 October 1982 – 1 December 1984	Transferred to the Division of Riverina-Darling after Riverina was abolished in 1984

=== Second incarnation (1993–present) ===
Image	Member	Party	Term	Notes
	Noel Hicks (1940–)	Nationals	13 March 1993 – 31 August 1998	Previously held the Division of Riverina-Darling. Retired
	Kay Hull (1954–)	Nationals	3 October 1998 – 19 July 2010	Retired
	Michael McCormack (1964–)	Nationals	21 August 2010 – present	Served as minister and Deputy Prime Minister under Turnbull and Morrison. Incumbent

== Election results ==
2025 Australian federal election: Riverina
Party	Candidate	Votes	%	±%
National	Michael McCormack	42,678	40.32	+5.93
Labor	Mark Jeffreson	19,506	18.43	−6.50
One Nation	Mark Craig	10,427	9.85	+2.50
Independent	Jenny Rolfe	6,909	6.53	+6.53
Independent	James Gooden	5,080	4.80	+4.80
Greens	Pheonix Valxori	4,767	4.50	−2.24
Shooters, Fishers, Farmers	Desiree Gregory	4,217	3.98	−0.09
Libertarian	Christine Onley	2,338	2.21	−3.53
Citizens	Richard Foley	2,233	2.11	+2.11
Family First	Mark Burge	2,151	2.03	+2.03
Independent	Grant Hardwick	1,861	1.76	+1.76
Independent	Barbara Baikie	1,858	1.76	+1.76
Independent	Jake Davis	1,812	1.71	+1.71
Total formal votes		105,837	88.73	−4.21
Informal votes		13,443	11.27	+4.21
Turnout		119,280	92.80	+1.11
Two-party-preferred result
National	Michael McCormack	66,276	62.62	+2.91
Labor	Mark Jeffreson	39,561	37.38	−2.91
National hold		Swing	+2.91	
