= Horace Nock =

Australian politician, farmer and company director

The Honourable Horace Nock
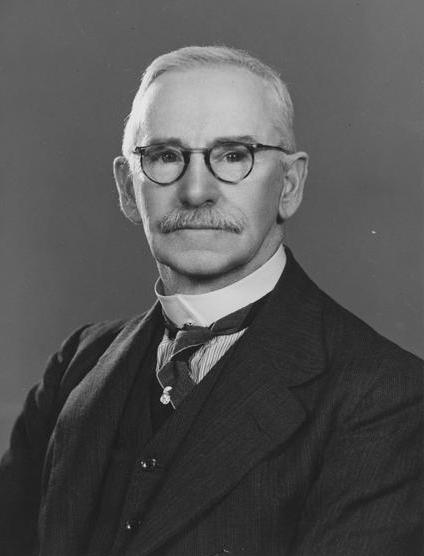

Member of the Australian Parliament for Riverina
- In office 19 December 1931 – 21 September 1940
- Preceded by: William Killen
- Succeeded by: Joe Langtry

Personal details
- Born: 26 October 1879 Salisbury, South Australia
- Died: 2 August 1958 (aged 78) Sydney, New South Wales
- Party: Australian Country Party
- Spouse: Marcia Nessie Clarke
- Occupation: Farmer, company director

Horace Keyworth Nock (26 October 1879 – 2 August 1958) was an Australian politician, farmer and company director.

== Early years and background ==
He was born at Salisbury, South Australia to Joseph Nock and his second wife Eliza, née Keyworth.

Nock attended Tarlee State School and Prince Alfred College in Adelaide, and joined his father's store and wheat buying business, which he ran from his father's death in 1904 until 1914, when he relocated to a grazing property, Nelungaloo, near Parkes, New South Wales. Here, he established a prosperous mixed farm. He was president of the Farmers and Settlers' Association of New South Wales from 1928 to 1932, and was treasurer from 1938 to 1958.

== Political career ==
Nock was elected to the Australian House of Representatives for the Division of Riverina in 1931, representing the Country Party. He was temporary chairman of committees (1935–37) and then secretary and whip of the party in 1937. Nock was appointed Minister without portfolio administering External Territories in 1940, when Archie Cameron led the Country Party into the Menzies ministry. Later that year, he was defeated in his own electorate, and his campaign for the Senate in 1943 was unsuccessful.

== Business career ==
A well-known representative of rural interests, Nock was known as the "Cockies' Patron Saint", and was a vigorous watchdog over tariffs. After leaving parliament, he remained closely involved with the Farmers and Settlers' Association, and also became involved with the Australian Wheatgrowers' Federation, Australian Pastoral Research Trust (of which he was a director), the Australian Wool Board and the Australian Wool Council, and was Australia's representative at the International Wool Secretariat of 1948.

In 1946 Nelungaloo Pty Ltd, Nock's company, challenged the Commonwealth's power of compulsory acquisition of wheat crops in the High Court of Australia. The case did not succeed, although it provided inspiration for the Commonwealth and State wheat industry stabilisation Acts of 1954. Nock was known as a nonconformist when it came to religion, and was always an active, vigorous and philanthropic man. He died in Sydney on 2 August 1958, having collapsed on his way to a meeting of the Farmers and Settlers' Association, and was given a state funeral.

== Personal ==
On 19 February 1908, Nock married Marcia Nessie Clarke at Tarlee, South Australia. She died in 1956, and Nock was survived by two sons and a daughter.

Political offices
Preceded by John Perkins	Minister without portfolio administering External Territories; 1938 – 1939	Succeeded by Thomas Collins as Minister without portfolio assisting the Prime Minister dealing with External Territories
Parliament of Australia
Preceded by William Killen	Member for Riverina; 1931 – 1940	Succeeded by Joe Langtry
