= 1904 Riverina by-election =

- 18 May 1904

The Riverina seat in the House of Representatives
- Registered: 19,031
- Turnout: 10,995 (57.77%)
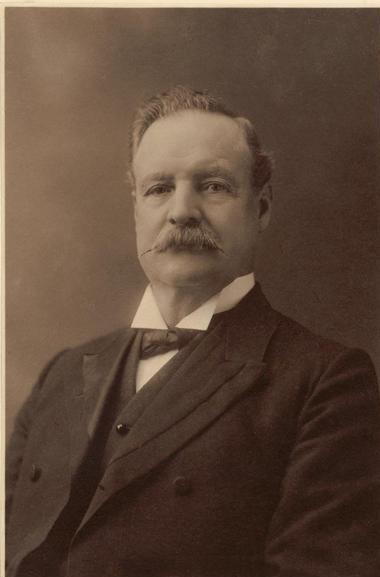

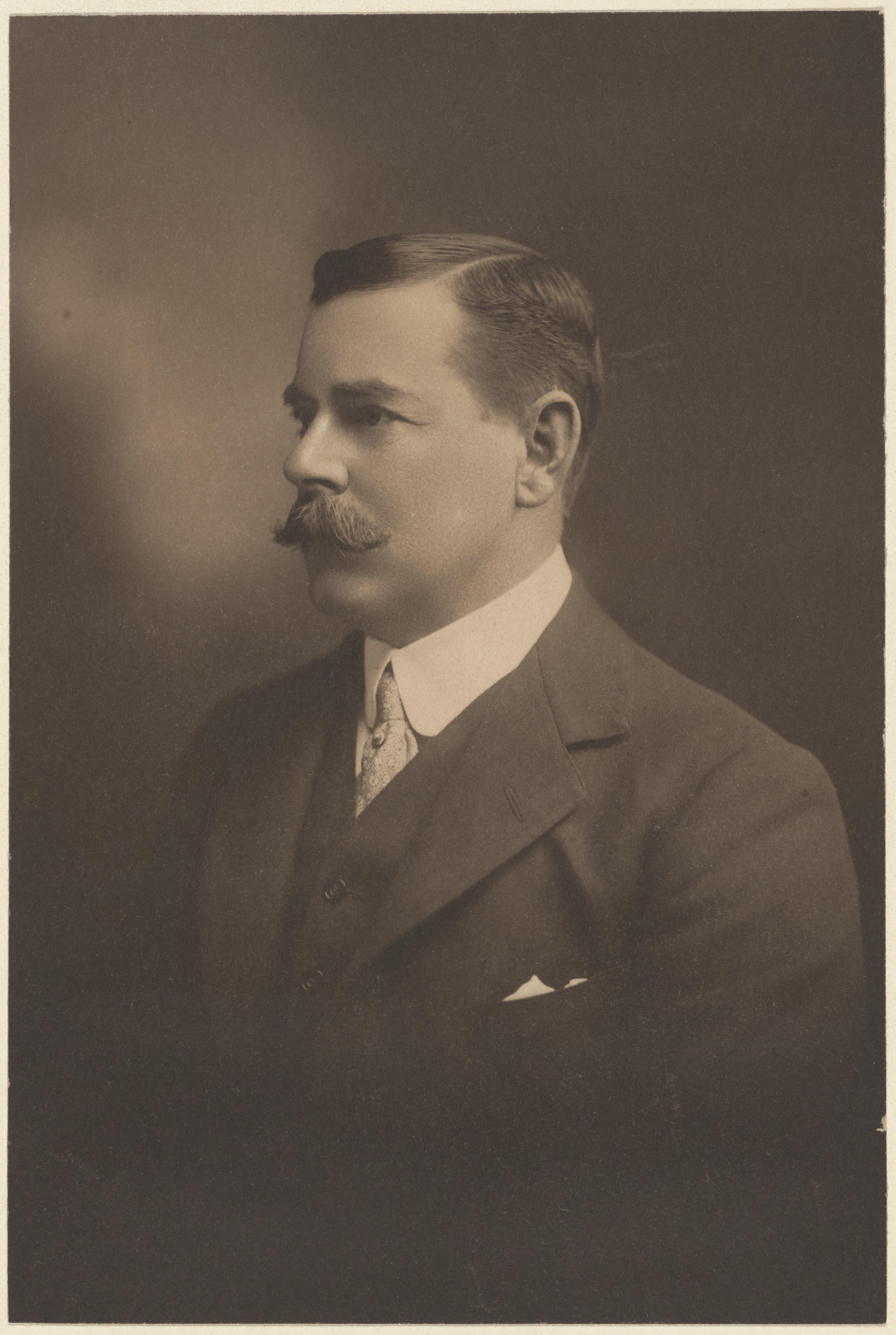
	First party	Second party
Candidate	John Chanter	Robert Blackwood
Party	Protectionist	Free Trade
Popular vote	5,547	5,184
Percentage	51.7%	48.3%
Swing	▲1.7	▼1.7
MP before election
Robert Blackwood
Free Trade
Elected MP
John Chanter
Protectionist

A by-election was held for the Australian House of Representatives seat of Riverina on 18 May 1904. This was triggered after the result at the 1903 election, which had seen Free Trade candidate Robert Blackwood narrowly defeat Protectionist MP John Chanter, was declared void due to allegations of electoral irregularities.

At the by-election Chanter defeated Blackwood.

== Results ==
1904 Riverina by-election
Party	Candidate	Votes	%	±%
Protectionist	John Chanter	5,547	51.69	+1.72
Free Trade	Robert Blackwood	5,184	48.31	−1.72
Total formal votes		10,731	97.60	−0.04
Informal votes		264	2.40	+0.04
Registered electors		19,031		
Turnout		10,995	57.77	+8.84
Protectionist gain from Free Trade		Swing	+1.72	
