= Maurie Sheehy =

Australian politician

Maurice Patrick Sheehy
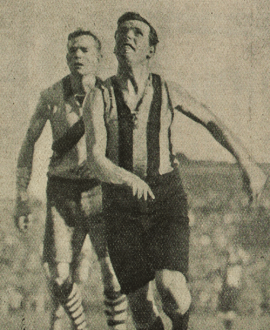
- Sheehy during his Collingwood career
- Born: 12 June 1893; Fairfield, Victoria
- Died: 10 January 1961 (aged 67); Fitzroy, Victoria
- Height: 175 cm (5 ft 9 in)
Australian rules football career
Personal information
- Original team: Northcote District
- Position: Ruckman
Playing career^{1}
Years	Club	Games (Goals)
1914, 1916–1922	Collingwood	110 (22)
- ^{1} Playing statistics correct to the end of 1922.

Legislative Council Member for Parliament

Personal details
- Party: Labor Party; Democratic Labor Party
- Profession: Footballer and politician

Maurice Patrick Sheehy (12 June 1893 – 10 January 1961) was an Australian politician, and a member of the Victorian Legislative Council for Melbourne Province. As a young man, "Maurie" Sheehy (as he was then known) was an Australian rules footballer who played for Collingwood in the Victorian Football League (VFL). As an older gentleman, Sheehy was a politician, better known as Patrick Sheehy.

== Sports notoriety ==
Sheehy began his sports career at Collingwood in 1914. After just two games he crossed to Fairfield where he spent the 1915 football season. The Northcote District recruit returned to Collingwood the following year and went on to appear in four Grand Finals. A back pocket in their 1919 premiership team, Sheehy also participated in the club's losing 1918, 1920, and 1922 Grand Final sides. He left Collingwood to coach Northcote in 1923.

== Political career ==
Sheehy joined the Labor Party in 1911. He was a Richmond, Australia, city councillor (1934–1956); and twice mayor (from 1941 to 1942 and 1951–52).

Sheehy had also contested the federal seat of Kooyong as the Australian Labor Party candidate in 1951, losing to the incumbent Robert Menzies.

Sheehy was elected to the Victorian State Legislative Council for the seat of Melbourne in June 1952, and served until his defeat in June 1958. He represented the Labor Party from 21 June 1952 until March 1955. When the party split in March 1955, Sheehy became a member of the Democratic Labor Party (or the Australian Labor Party (Anti-Communist) as it was originally known) until his defeat on 20 June 1958.

Sheehy was a Melbourne and Metropolitan Board of Works Commissioner from 1950 until 1956, and he also served for a time as a member of the Richmond Girls' Secondary School Council.
