= Candidates of the 1906 Australian federal election =

This article provides information on candidates who stood for the 1906 Australian federal election. The election was held on 12 December 1906.

== By-elections, appointments and defections ==
=== By-elections and appointments ===
- On 26 February 1904, Norman Cameron (Free Trade) was elected to replace Sir Edward Braddon (Free Trade) as the member for Wilmot.
- On 30 March 1904, William Maloney (Labour) was elected to replace Sir Malcolm McEacharn (Protectionist) as the member for Melbourne. McEacharn's election in 1903 had been declared void.
- On 18 May 1904, John Chanter (Protectionist) was elected to replace Robert Blackwood (Free Trade) as the member for Riverina. Blackwood's election in 1903 had been declared void.
- On 12 October 1906, Isaac Isaacs (Protectionist) resigned as the member for Indi. H. B. Higgins (Protectionist) resigned as the member for Northern Melbourne the following day. Due to the proximity of the election, no by-elections were held.

=== Defections ===
- In 1904, Independent MP James Wilkinson (Moreton) joined the Labour Party.
- In 1904, the Free Trade Party under its leader George Reid took office from the Watson Labour Government. Protectionists Senator James Drake (Queensland), James McCay (Corinella), Allan McLean (Gippsland) and Sir George Turner (Balaclava) accepted office under Reid and effectively ended their connection with the Protectionist Party, becoming Free Trade MPs. They were joined by Richard Edwards (Oxley), Senator Simon Fraser (Victoria), Sir Philip Fysh (Denison) and James McColl (Echuca). Around this time the Revenue Tariff Party was dissolved, and its two parliamentarians, Senator Henry Dobson (Tasmania) and William McWilliams (Franklin), also became Free Traders. Protectionists Sir John Forrest (Swan) and Sir John Quick (Bendigo) also dissolved their relationship with Deakin's party, but stopped short of joining the Free Traders. They were the beginning of what became known as the "Corner" group of independent conservative protectionists.
- In 1906, the Free Trade Party was renamed the Anti-Socialist Party.
- In 1906, the Western Australian Party was formed. Sir John Forrest (Swan), formerly a Protectionist, ran as its endorsed candidate, but in reality remained a member of the "Corner" group.
- Anti-Socialist MP Norman Cameron (Wilmot) lost pre-selection and contested the election as an independent.
- Labour Senator Anderson Dawson (Queensland) initially announced his intention to retire at this election. He ultimately decided to contest it, but as the Labour candidates had already been selected he ran as an independent.
- Labour MP James Ronald (Southern Melbourne), whose seat was abolished, was unsuccessful seeking pre-selection for Melbourne Ports. He contested the election as an independent.

== Redistributions and seat changes ==
- Redistributions of electoral boundaries occurred in New South Wales and Victoria.
  - In New South Wales, Bland was abolished, Cook and Nepean were created, and Canobolas was renamed Calare.
    - The member for Bland, Chris Watson (Labour), contested South Sydney.
    - The member for Canobolas, Thomas Brown (Labour), contested Calare.
  - In Victoria, Corinella and Moira were abolished, Maribyrnong was created, and Northern Melbourne and Southern Melbourne were renamed Batman and Fawkner respectively.
    - The member for Corinella, James McCay (Anti-Socialist), contested Corio.
    - The member for Echuca, James McColl (Anti-Socialist), contested the Senate.
    - The member for Flinders, James Gibb (Anti-Socialist), contested the New South Wales seat of Hume.
    - The member for Grampians, Thomas Skene (Anti-Socialist), contested the Senate.
    - The member for Melbourne Ports, Samuel Mauger (Protectionist), contested Maribyrnong.
    - The member for Moira, Thomas Kennedy (Protectionist), contested Echuca.
    - The member for Southern Melbourne, James Ronald (Independent), contested Melbourne Ports.

== Retiring Members and Senators ==
=== Protectionist ===
- Sir Langdon Bonython MP (Barker, SA)
- Pharez Phillips MP (Wimmera, Vic)
- Senator James Drake (Qld)
- Senator Sir William Zeal (Vic)

=== Free Trade ===
- George Edwards MP (South Sydney, NSW)
- Sir George Turner MP (Balaclava, Vic) – elected as Protectionist
- Senator Sir Richard Baker (SA)
- Senator Alexander Matheson (WA)
- Senator Staniforth Smith (WA)

== House of Representatives ==
Sitting members at the time of the election are shown in bold text. Successful candidates are highlighted in the relevant colour. Where there is possible confusion, an asterisk (*) is also used.

=== New South Wales ===
Electorate	Held by	Protectionist candidate	Anti-Socialist candidate	Labour candidate	Other candidates
Barrier	Labour		George Marshall	**Josiah Thomas**	
Calare	Labour		John Fitzpatrick	**Thomas Brown**	
Cook	Unknown		John Hindle	James Catts	
Cowper	Anti-Socialist	John Thomson	**Henry Lee**	John O'Brien	Eugene Rudder (Ind)
Dalley	Anti-Socialist		**Bill Wilks**	Robert Howe	
Darling	Labour		Denis Acton	**William Spence**	
East Sydney	Anti-Socialist		**George Reid**	John West	
Eden-Monaro	Protectionist	**Austin Chapman**	John Longmuir		
Gwydir	Labour		Thomas Cunningham	**William Webster**	
Hume	Protectionist	**Sir William Lyne**	**James Gibb**		
Hunter	Anti-Socialist		**Frank Liddell**	William Kearsley	
Illawarra	Anti-Socialist		**George Fuller**	George Holt	
Lang	Anti-Socialist		**Elliot Johnson**	Edward Bennetts	
Macquarie	Anti-Socialist		**Sydney Smith**	Ernest Carr	
Nepean	Unknown		Eric Bowden	Charles Dyer	Thomas Taylor (Ind AS)
Newcastle	Labour		John Hawthorne	**David Watkins**	
New England	Anti-Socialist		**Edmund Lonsdale**	Frank Foster	
North Sydney	Anti-Socialist		**Dugald Thomson**		
Parkes	Anti-Socialist		**Bruce Smith**		Hampton Slatyer (Ind AS)
Parramatta	Anti-Socialist		**Joseph Cook**		
Richmond	Protectionist	**Thomas Ewing**	John Sutton		
Riverina	Protectionist	**John Chanter**	John Jackson		
Robertson	Anti-Socialist		**Henry Willis**	William Johnson	
South Sydney	Anti-Socialist		Sir James Graham	**Chris Watson**	
Wentworth	Anti-Socialist		**Willie Kelly**	William Duncan	
Werriwa	Anti-Socialist		**Alfred Conroy**	David Hall	
West Sydney	Labour		James Burns	**Billy Hughes**	

=== Queensland ===
Electorate	Held by	Protectionist candidate	Anti-Socialist candidate	Labour candidate
Brisbane	Labour		Justin Foxton	**Millice Culpin**
Capricornia	Labour		Edward Archer	**David Thomson**
Darling Downs	Protectionist	**Littleton Groom**		Horace Ransome
Herbert	Labour		Walter Tunbridge	**Fred Bamford**
Kennedy	Labour		Frederick Johnson	**Charles McDonald**
Maranoa	Labour		Joseph Little	**Jim Page**
Moreton	Independent		Hugh Sinclair	**James Wilkinson**
Oxley	Protectionist		**Richard Edwards**	Alfred Merry
Wide Bay	Labour		Jasper Harvey	**Andrew Fisher**

=== South Australia ===
Electorate	Held by	Protectionist candidate	Anti-Socialist candidate	Labour candidate	Independent candidate(s)
Adelaide	Protectionist	**Charles Kingston**			
Angas	Anti-Socialist		**Paddy Glynn**	Alexander Dey	
Barker	Protectionist		John Livingston	Roland Campbell	
Boothby	Labour			**Lee Batchelor**	
Grey	Anti-Socialist			**Alexander Poynton**	
Hindmarsh	Labour			**James Hutchison**	
Wakefield	Independent			John Vaughan	**Sir Frederick Holder**

=== Tasmania ===
Electorate	Held by	Protectionist candidate	Anti-Socialist candidate	Labour candidate	Other candidates
Bass	Protectionist	**David Storrer**	William Oldham		
Darwin	Labour		William Lamerton	**King O'Malley**	Henry Bannister (Ind AS)
Denison	Protectionist		**Sir Philip Fysh**	George Burns	William Brown (Ind Prot)
Franklin	Revenue Tariff		**William McWilliams**		
Wilmot	Anti-Socialist	Charles Fenton	Llewellyn Atkinson	Thomas Wilson	**Norman Cameron** (Ind AS)

=== Victoria ===
Electorate	Held by	Protectionist candidate	Anti-Socialist candidate	Labour candidate	Independent candidate(s)
Balaclava	Protectionist	Edward Roberts		Alfred Hampson	Joseph Hewison (Ind AS); Agar Wynne* (Ind Prot)
Ballaarat	Protectionist	**Alfred Deakin**		James Scullin	
Batman	Unknown	Jabez Coon		Robert Solly	Samuel Painter (Ind); Roy Vernon (Ind Prot)
Bendigo	Protectionist			Thomas Glass	**Sir John Quick** (Ind Prot)
Bourke	Protectionist	**James Hume Cook**	Joseph Molden	Randolph Bedford	
Corangamite	Anti-Socialist	Desmond Dunne	**Gratton Wilson**	Thomas Carey	
Corio	Protectionist	**Richard Crouch**	**James McCay**		
Echuca	Protectionist	**Thomas Kennedy**	Albert Palmer		
Fawkner	Unknown	John Miller		Thomas Smith	George Fairbairn (Ind Prot)
Flinders	Anti-Socialist	Arthur Nichols	William Irvine		
Gippsland	Protectionist	George Wise	**Allan McLean**		
Grampians	Anti-Socialist		Hans Irvine	Edward Grayndler	
Indi	Protectionist	Thomas McInerney	Joseph Brown	Daniel Turnbull	
Kooyong	Anti-Socialist	Robert Barbour	**William Knox**	Edward Hodges	
Laanecoorie	Protectionist	**Carty Salmon**	Walter Grose	William Rowe	
Maribyrnong	Unknown	**Samuel Mauger**		Clement Davidson	
Melbourne	Labour			**William Maloney**	William Lormer (Ind Prot)
Melbourne Ports	Protectionist	Edward Watts		James Mathews	Cyril James (Ind AS); **James Ronald** (Ind Lab)
Mernda	Protectionist	**Robert Harper**	John Leckie	James Kenneally	Richard O'Neill (Ind Prot)
Wannon	Anti-Socialist		**Arthur Robinson**	John McDougall	
Wimmera	Protectionist			Richard Taffe	Herman Brauer (Ind Prot); Max Hirsch (Ind AS); William Leslie (Ind AS); Sydney Sampson* (Ind Prot)
Yarra	Labour			**Frank Tudor**	George Roberts (Ind Lab); Richard Vale (Ind Prot)

=== Western Australia ===
Electorate	Held by	Labour candidate	WAP candidate
Coolgardie	Labour	**Hugh Mahon**	John Archibald
Fremantle	Labour	**William Carpenter**	William Hedges
Kalgoorlie	Labour	**Charlie Frazer**	William Burton
Perth	Labour	**James Fowler**	Edward Thurstan
Swan	Protectionist	Peter O'Loghlen	**Sir John Forrest**

== Senate ==
Sitting senators are shown in bold text. Tickets that elected at least one Senator are highlighted in the relevant colour. Successful candidates are identified by an asterisk (*).

=== New South Wales ===
Three seats were up for election. The Anti-Socialist Party was defending three seats. Anti-Socialist Senators John Gray, John Neild and Edward Pulsford were not up for re-election.

Anti-Socialist candidates	Labour candidates	Socialist Labor candidates
**Albert Gould***; **Edward Millen***; **James Walker***	George Clark; Allan McDougall; Greg McGirr	Tom Batho; James Moroney; John Willcox

=== Queensland ===
Three seats were up for election. The Protectionist Party had held one seat. The Labour Party was defending two seats. Labour Senators Thomas Givens, James Stewart and Harry Turley were not up for re-election.

Anti-Socialist candidates	Labour candidates	Other candidates
Thomas Chataway*; Robert Sayers*; Anthony St Ledger*	James Griffith; **William Higgs**; Jens Lundager	**Anderson Dawson** (Ind Lab)

=== South Australia ===
Three seats were up for election. The Protectionist Party was defending one seat. The Anti-Socialist Party was defending two seats. Labour Senators Robert Guthrie, Gregor McGregor and William Story were not up for re-election.

Protectionist candidates	Anti-Socialist candidates	Labour candidates
**Thomas Playford**	David Charleston; **Sir Josiah Symon***; Joseph Vardon*	Reginald Blundell; Dugald Crosby; William Russell*

=== Tasmania ===
Three seats were up for election. The Protectionist Party was defending one seat. The Anti-Socialist Party was defending one seat. The Labour Party was defending one seat. Protectionist Senator Edward Mulcahy and Anti-Socialist Senators Henry Dobson and James Macfarlane were not up for re-election.

Protectionist candidates	Anti-Socialist candidates	Labour candidates
**John Keating***	Cyril Cameron*; **John Clemons***; Norman Ewing	James Guy; **David O'Keefe**

=== Victoria ===
Three seats were up for election. The Protectionist Party was defending three seats. Protectionist Senator Robert Best, Labour Senator Edward Findley and Independent Senator William Trenwith were not up for re-election.

Protectionist candidates	Anti-Socialist candidates	Labour candidates
Charles Atkins; Alexander Ramsay; **James Styles**	**Simon Fraser***; James McColl*; Thomas Skene	Stephen Barker; Edward Russell*; Tom Tunnecliffe

=== Western Australia ===
Three seats were up for election. The Anti-Socialist Party had held two seats. The Labour Party was defending one seat. Labour Senators John Croft, Hugh de Largie and George Henderson were not up for re-election.

Labour candidates	WAP candidates
Patrick Lynch*; Ted Needham*; **George Pearce***	Charles Clarke; Henry Mills; Edward Wittenoom

== See also ==
- 1906 Australian federal election
- Members of the Australian House of Representatives, 1903–1906
- Members of the Australian House of Representatives, 1906–1910
- Members of the Australian Senate, 1904–1906
- Members of the Australian Senate, 1907–1910
- List of political parties in Australia
