= Members of the Australian House of Representatives, 1903–1906 =

Members of the Australian House of Representatives, 1903-1906
- ←1901-1903 1906-1910→

This is a list of the members of the Australian House of Representatives in the Second Australian Parliament, which was elected on 16 December 1903.

Images	Member	Party	Electorate	State	In office	Portfolio
	Fred Bamford	Labour	Herbert	Qld	1901–1925	
	Lee Batchelor	Labour	Boothby	SA	1901–1911	• Minister for Home Affairs from 27 April 1904 to 18 August 1904
	Robert Blackwood (Note: On 13 April 1904, the election of Free Trade MP Robert Blackwood (Riverina) was declared invalid by the Court of Disputed Returns. Protectionist candidate John Chanter won the resulting by-election on 18 May 1904 defeating Blackwood.)	Free Trade (Note: The Free Trade Party, then known as the Australian Free Trade and Liberal Association, had dissolved following the 1901 election. Members categorised as "Free Trade" were those who accepted the leadership of George Reid.)	Riverina	NSW	1903–1904	
	Sir Langdon Bonython *	Protectionist (Note: There was no national Protectionist party organisation at the time of the 1903 election. Members categorised as "Protectionist" were those who accepted the leadership of Alfred Deakin.)	Barker	SA	1901–1906	
	Sir Edward Braddon (Note: On 2 February 1904, Free Trade MP Sir Edward Braddon (Wilmot) died. Free Trade candidate Norman Cameron won the resulting by-election on 26 February 1904.)	Free Trade	Wilmot	Tas	1901–1904	
	Thomas Brown *	Labour	Canobolas	NSW	1901–1913	
	Norman Cameron	Free Trade	Wilmot	Tas	1901–1903; 1904–1906	
	Norman Cameron	Independent	Wilmot	Tas	1901–1903; 1904–1906	
	William Carpenter	Labour	Fremantle	WA	1903–1906	
	John Chanter	Protectionist	Riverina	NSW	1901–1903; 1904–1913; 1914–1922	
	Austin Chapman *	Protectionist	Eden-Monaro	NSW	1901–1926	• Minister for Defence from 24 September 1903 to 27 April 1904 • Postmaster-General from 5 July 1905 to 30 July 1907
	Alfred Conroy	Free Trade	Werriwa	NSW	1901–1906; 1913–1914	
	James Cook	Protectionist	Bourke	Vic	1901–1910	• Chief Government Whip in the House from 1 March 1904 to 27 April 1904 and from 5 July 1905 to 13 November 1908 • Chief Opposition Whip in the House from 27 April 1904 to 5 July 1905
	Joseph Cook	Free Trade	Parramatta	NSW	1901–1921	• Deputy Leader of the Free Trade Party from 28 July 1905 to 16 November 1909
	Richard Crouch	Protectionist	Corio	Vic	1901–1910; 1929–1931	
	Millice Culpin	Labour	Brisbane	Qld	1903–1906	
	Alfred Deakin *	Protectionist	Ballarat	Vic	1901–1913	• Prime Minister from 24 September 1903 to 27 April 1904 and from 5 July 1905 to 13 November 1908 • Leader of the Protectionist Party from 24 September 1903 to 26 May 1909 • Minister for External Affairs from 24 September 1903 to 27 April 1904 and from 5 July 1905 to 13 November 1908
	George Edwards	Free Trade	South Sydney	NSW	1901–1906; 1910–1911	
	Richard Edwards	Protectionist	Oxley	Qld	1901–1913	
	Richard Edwards	Free Trade	Oxley	Qld	1901–1913	
	Thomas Ewing	Protectionist	Richmond	NSW	1901–1910	• Vice-President of the Executive Council from 5 July 1905 to 12 October 1906 • Minister for Home Affairs from 12 October 1906 to 24 January 1907
	Andrew Fisher	Labour	Wide Bay	Qld	1901–1915	• Minister for Trade and Customs from 27 of April to 18 August 1904
	Sir John Forrest *	Protectionist	Swan	WA	1901–1918	• Minister for Home Affairs from 11 August 1903 to 27 April 1904 • Treasure from 5 July 1905 to 30 July 1907
	James Fowler	Labour	Perth	WA	1901–1922	
	Charlie Frazer	Labour	Kalgoorlie	WA	1903–1913	
	George Fuller *	Free Trade	Illawarra	NSW	1901–1913	
	Sir Philip Fysh	Protectionist	Denison	Tas	1901–1910	• Postmaster-General from 10 August 1903 to 27 April 1904
	Sir Philip Fysh	Free Trade	Denison	Tas	1901–1910	• Postmaster-General from 10 August 1903 to 27 April 1904
	James Gibb	Free Trade	Flinders	Vic	1903–1906	
	Paddy Glynn *	Free Trade	Angas	SA	1901–1919	
	Littleton Groom *	Protectionist	Darling Downs	Qld	1901–1929; 1931–1936	• Ministers for Home Affairs from 5 July 1905 to 12 October 1906 • Attorney-General from 12 October 1906 to 13 November 1908
	Robert Harper	Protectionist	Mernda	Vic	1901–1913	
	H. B. Higgins	Protectionist	Northern Melbourne	Vic	1901–1906	• Attorney-General from 27 April 1904 to 18 August 1904
	Sir Frederick Holder *	Independent	Wakefield	SA	1901–1909	•Speaker of the House of Representatives from 9 May 1901 to 23 July 1909
	Billy Hughes	Labour	West Sydney	NSW	1901–1952	• Minister for External Affairs from 27 April 1904 to 18 August 1904
	James Hutchison	Labour	Hindmarsh	SA	1903–1909	
	Isaac Isaacs *	Protectionist	Indi	Vic	1901–1906	•Attorney-General from 5 July 1905 to 12 October 1906
	Elliot Johnson	Free Trade	Lang	NSW	1903–1928	
	Willie Kelly	Free Trade	Wentworth	NSW	1903–1919	
	Thomas Kennedy	Protectionist	Moira	Vic	1901–1906	
	Charles Kingston *	Protectionist	Adelaide	SA	1901–1908	
	William Knox	Free Trade	Kooyong	Vic	1901–1910	
	Henry Lee	Free Trade	Cowper	NSW	1903–1906	
	Frank Liddell	Free Trade	Hunter	NSW	1903–1910	
	Edmund Lonsdale	Free Trade	New England	NSW	1903–1906	
	Sir William Lyne	Protectionist	Hume	NSW	1901–1913	• Deputy Leader of the Protectionist Party from 24 September 1903 to 27 April 1904 and from 5 July 1905 to 13 November 1908 • Minister for Trade and Customs from 11 August 1903 to 27 April 1904 and from 5 July 1905 to 30 July 1907
	Hugh Mahon *	Labour	Coolgardie	WA	1901–1913; 1913–1917; 1919–1920	• Postmaster-General from 27 April 1904 to 18 August 1904
	William Maloney (Note: On 10 March 1904, the election of Protectionist MP Sir Malcolm McEacharn (Melbourne) was declared invalid by the Court of Disputed Returns. Labour candidate William Maloney won the resulting by-election on 30 March 1904 defeating McEacharn.)	Labour	Melbourne	Vic	1904–1940	
	Samuel Mauger	Protectionist	Melbourne Ports	Vic	1901–1910	• Minister without Portfolio from 12 October 1906 to 30 July 1907
	James McCay *	Protectionist	Corinella	Vic	1901–1906	• Minister for Defence from 18 August 1904 to 5 July 1905
	James McColl	Protectionist	Echuca	Vic	1901–1906	
	James McColl	Free Trade	Echuca	Vic	1901–1906	
	Charles McDonald	Labour	Kennedy	Qld	1901–1925	
	Sir Malcolm McEacharn	Protectionist	Melbourne	Vic	1901–1904	
	Allan McLean *	Protectionist	Gippsland	Vic	1901–1906	• Minister for Trade and Customs from 18 August 1904 to 5 July 1905
	William McWilliams	Revenue Tariff	Franklin	Tas	1903–1922; 1928–1929	
	William McWilliams	Free Trade	Franklin	Tas	1903–1922; 1928–1929	
	King O'Malley	Labour	Darwin	Tas	1901–1917	
	Jim Page	Labour	Maranoa	Qld	1901–1921	
	Pharez Phillips	Protectionist	Wimmera	Vic	1901–1906	
	Alexander Poynton *	Free Trade	Grey	SA	1901–1922	
	Alexander Poynton *	Labour	Grey	SA	1901–1922	
	Sir John Quick	Protectionist	Bendigo	Vic	1901–1913	
	George Reid	Free Trade	East Sydney	NSW	1901–1903; 1903–1910	• Prime Minister from 17 August 1904 to 5 July 1905 • Leader of the Opposition from 19 May 1901 to 18 August 1904 and from 5 July 1904 to 16 November 1908 • Minister of External Affairs from 17 August 1904 to 5 July 1905 • Leader of the Free Trade Party from 18 November 1891 to 16 November 1908
	Arthur Robinson	Free Trade	Wannon	Vic	1903–1906	
	James Ronald	Labour	Southern Melbourne	Vic	1901–1906	
	James Ronald	Independent	Southern Melbourne	Vic	1901–1906	
	Carty Salmon	Protectionist	Laanecoorie	Vic	1901–1913; 1915–1917	• Chairmen of Committees from 17 March 1904 to 21 December 1905
	Thomas Skene	Free Trade	Grampians	Vic	1901–1906	
	Bruce Smith	Free Trade	Parkes	NSW	1901–1919	
	Sydney Smith	Free Trade	Macquarie	NSW	1901–1906	• Chief Opposition Whip of the House from 10 May 1901 to 18 August 1904 • Chief Government Whip of the House from 18 August to 3 September 1904 • Postmaster-General from 18 August to 5 July 1905
	William Spence	Labour	Darling	NSW	1901–1917; 1917–1919	
	David Storrer	Protectionist	Bass	Tas	1903–1910	
	Josiah Thomas	Labour	Barrier	NSW	1901–1917	
	David Thomson	Labour	Capricornia	Qld	1903–1906	
	Dugald Thomson *	Free Trade	North Sydney	NSW	1901–1910	• Minister for Home Affairs from 18 August 1904 to 5 July 1905 • Deputy Leader of the Free Trade Party from 23 November 1903 to 28 July 1905
	Frank Tudor	Labour	Yarra	Vic	1901–1922	• Chief Labour Whip of the House from 12 June 1901 to 12 November 1908
	Sir George Turner *	Protectionist	Balaclava	Vic	1901–1906	• Treasure from 1 January 1901 to 27 April 1904 and from 18 August 1904 to 5 July 1905
	David Watkins	Labour	Newcastle	NSW	1901–1935	
	Chris Watson	Labour	Bland	NSW	1901–1910	• Prime Minister from 27 April 1904 to 18 August 1904 • Leader of the Opposition from 18 August 1904 to 5 July 1905 • Leader of the Labour Party from 20 May 1901 to 30 October 1907 • Treasure from 27 April 1904 to 18 August 1904
	William Webster	Labour	Gwydir	NSW	1903–1919	
	James Wilkinson	Independent	Moreton	Qld	1901–1906	
	James Wilkinson	Labour	Moreton	Qld	1901–1906	
	Bill Wilks	Free Trade	Dalley	NSW	1901–1910	• Chief Government Whip of the House from 3 September 1904 to 5 July 1905 • Chief Opposition Whip of the House from 5 July 1905 to 20 February 1907
	Henry Willis	Free Trade	Robertson	NSW	1901–1910	
	John Wilson	Free Trade	Corangamite	Vic	1903–1910	

== Notes ==
* These candidates were elected unopposed.
