= Members of the Australian House of Representatives, 1906–1910 =

Members of the Australian House of Representatives, 1906-1910
- ←1903-1906 1910-1913→

This is a list of the members of the Australian House of Representatives in the Third Australian Parliament, which was elected on 12 December 1906.

In 1909 the Anti-Socialist Party (previously Free Trade) and most of the Protectionist Party merged to become the Commonwealth Liberal Party.

Images	Member	Party	Electorate	State	In office	Portfolio
	Edward Archer	Anti-Socialist	Capricornia	Qld	1906	
	Edward Archer	Liberal	Capricornia	Qld	1906	
	Llewellyn Atkinson	Anti-Socialist	Wilmot	Tas	1906	
	Llewellyn Atkinson	Liberal	Wilmot	Tas	1906	
	Frederick Bamford	Labour	Herbert	Qld	1901	
	Lee Batchelor *	Labour	Boothby	SA	1901	• Minister for External Affairs from 13 November 1908 to 2 June 1909
	Eric Bowden	Anti-Socialist	Nepean †	NSW	1906	
	Eric Bowden	Liberal	Nepean †	NSW	1906	
	Joseph Brown	Anti-Socialist	Indi	Vic	1906	
	Joseph Brown	Liberal	Indi	Vic	1906	
	Thomas Brown	Labour	Calare †	NSW	1901	
	Ernest Carr	Labour	Macquarie	NSW	1906	
	James Catts	Labour	Cook †	NSW	1906	
	John Chanter	Protectionist	Riverina	NSW	1904 (by-election)	
	John Chanter	Labour	Riverina	NSW	1904 (by-election)	
	Austin Chapman	Protectionist	Eden-Monaro	NSW	1901	• Postmaster-General from 5 July 1905 to 30 July 1907 • Minister for Trade and Customs from 30 July 1907 to 13 November 1908
	Austin Chapman	Liberal	Eden-Monaro	NSW	1901	• Postmaster-General from 5 July 1905 to 30 July 1907 • Minister for Trade and Customs from 30 July 1907 to 13 November 1908
	James Cook	Protectionist	Bourke	Vic	1901	• Chief Government Whip in the House From 5 July 1905 to 13 November 1908 and from 2 June 1909 to 29 April 1910 • Chief Opposition Whip in the House from 26 May to 2 June 1909 • Minister without Portfolio from 28 January 1908 to 13 November 1908
	James Cook	Liberal	Bourke	Vic	1901	• Chief Government Whip in the House From 5 July 1905 to 13 November 1908 and from 2 June 1909 to 29 April 1910 • Chief Opposition Whip in the House from 26 May to 2 June 1909 • Minister without Portfolio from 28 January 1908 to 13 November 1908
	Joseph Cook *	Anti-Socialist	Parramatta	NSW	1901	• Leader of the Opposition from 16 November 1908 to 26 May 1909 • Leader of the Anti-Socialist Party from 16 November 1908 to 26 May 1909 • Deputy of the Anti-Socialist Party from 28 July 1905 to 16 November 1909 • Deputy Leader of the Liberal Party from 2 June 1908 to 1910 • Minister for Defence from 2 June 1909 to 29 April 1910
	Joseph Cook *	Liberal	Parramatta	NSW	1901	• Leader of the Opposition from 16 November 1908 to 26 May 1909 • Leader of the Anti-Socialist Party from 16 November 1908 to 26 May 1909 • Deputy of the Anti-Socialist Party from 28 July 1905 to 16 November 1909 • Deputy Leader of the Liberal Party from 2 June 1908 to 1910 • Minister for Defence from 2 June 1909 to 29 April 1910
	Jabez Coon	Protectionist	Batman †	Vic	1906	
	Jabez Coon	Liberal	Batman †	Vic	1906	
	Richard Crouch	Protectionist	Corio	Vic	1901	
	Richard Crouch	Liberal	Corio	Vic	1901	
	Alfred Deakin	Protectionist	Ballarat	Vic	1901	• Prime Minister from 5 July 1905 to 13 November 1908 and from 2 June 1909 to 29 April 1910 • Leader of the Opposition from 27 May 1909 to 2 June 1909 • Minister for External Affairs from 5 July 1905 to 13 November 1908 • Leader of the Protectionist Party from 24 September 1903 to 26 May 1909 • Leader of the Liberal Party from 27 May 1909 to 20 January 1910
	Alfred Deakin	Liberal	Ballarat	Vic	1901	• Prime Minister from 5 July 1905 to 13 November 1908 and from 2 June 1909 to 29 April 1910 • Leader of the Opposition from 27 May 1909 to 2 June 1909 • Minister for External Affairs from 5 July 1905 to 13 November 1908 • Leader of the Protectionist Party from 24 September 1903 to 26 May 1909 • Leader of the Liberal Party from 27 May 1909 to 20 January 1910
	Richard Edwards	Anti-Socialist	Oxley	Qld	1901	
	Richard Edwards	Liberal	Oxley	Qld	1901	
	Thomas Ewing	Protectionist	Richmond	NSW	1901	• Minister for Home Affairs from 12 October 1906 to 24 January 1907 • Minister for Defence from 24 January 1907 to 13 November 1908
	Thomas Ewing	Liberal	Richmond	NSW	1901	• Minister for Home Affairs from 12 October 1906 to 24 January 1907 • Minister for Defence from 24 January 1907 to 13 November 1908
	George Fairbairn	Independent	Fawkner †	Vic	1906	
	George Fairbairn	Liberal	Fawkner †	Vic	1906	
	Andrew Fisher	Labour	Wide Bay	Qld	1901	• Prime Minister from 13 November 1908 to 2 June 1909 • Treasurer from 13 November 1908 to 2 June 1909 • Leader of the Labour Party from 30 October 1907 to 27 October 1915
	Sir John Forrest	Western Australian Party	Swan	WA	1901	• Treasure from 5 July 1905 to 30 July 1907 and from 2 June 1909 to 29 April 1910
	Sir John Forrest	Liberal	Swan	WA	1901	• Treasure from 5 July 1905 to 30 July 1907 and from 2 June 1909 to 29 April 1910
	Frank Foster	Labour	New England	NSW	1906	
	James Fowler	Labour	Perth	WA	1901	
	James Fowler	Liberal	Perth	WA	1901	
	Justin Foxton	Anti-Socialist	Brisbane	Qld	1906	• Minister without Portfolio from 2 June 1909 to 29 April 1910
	Justin Foxton	Liberal	Brisbane	Qld	1906	• Minister without Portfolio from 2 June 1909 to 29 April 1910
	Charlie Frazer	Labour	Kalgoorlie	WA	1903	
	George Fuller	Anti-Socialist	Illawarra	NSW	1901	• Minister for Home Affairs from 2 June 1909 to 29 April 1910
	George Fuller	Liberal	Illawarra	NSW	1901	• Minister for Home Affairs from 2 June 1909 to 29 April 1910
	Sir Philip Fysh	Anti-Socialist	Denison	Tas	1901	
	Sir Philip Fysh	Liberal	Denison	Tas	1901	
	Paddy Glynn	Anti-Socialist	Angas	SA	1901	• Attorney-General from 2 June 1909 to 29 April 1910
	Paddy Glynn	Liberal	Angas	SA	1901	• Attorney-General from 2 June 1909 to 29 April 1910
	Littleton Groom	Protectionist	Darling Downs	Qld	1901	• Attorney-General from 12 October 1906 to 13 November 1908 • Minister for External Affairs from 2 June 1909 to 29 April 1910
	Littleton Groom	Liberal	Darling Downs	Qld	1901	• Attorney-General from 12 October 1906 to 13 November 1908 • Minister for External Affairs from 2 June 1909 to 29 April 1910
	David Hall	Labour	Werriwa	NSW	1906	
	Robert Harper	Protectionist	Mernda	Vic	1901	
	Robert Harper	Liberal	Mernda	Vic	1901	
	William Hedges	Western Australian Party	Fremantle	WA	1906	
	William Hedges	Liberal	Fremantle	WA	1906	
	Frederick Holder	Independent	Wakefield	SA	1901	• Speaker of the House of Representatives from 9 May 1901 to 23 May 1909
	Billy Hughes	Labour	West Sydney	NSW	1901	• Attorney-General from 13 November 1908 to 2 June 1909
	James Hutchison *	Labour	Hindmarsh	SA	1903	• Minister without Portfolio from 13 November 1908 to 2 June 1909
	Hans Irvine	Anti-Socialist	Grampians	Vic	1906	
	Hans Irvine	Liberal	Grampians	Vic	1906	
	William Irvine	Anti-Socialist	Flinders	Vic	1906	
	William Irvine	Liberal	Flinders	Vic	1906	
	Elliot Johnson	Anti-Socialist	Lang	NSW	1903	
	Elliot Johnson	Liberal	Lang	NSW	1903	
	Willie Kelly	Anti-Socialist	Wentworth	NSW	1903	• Chief Opposition Whip in the House from 20 February 1907 to 26 May 1909
	Willie Kelly	Liberal	Wentworth	NSW	1903	• Chief Opposition Whip in the House from 20 February 1907 to 26 May 1909
	Charles Kingston *	Protectionist	Adelaide	SA	1901	
	William Knox	Anti-Socialist	Kooyong	Vic	1901	
	William Knox	Liberal	Kooyong	Vic	1901	
	Frank Liddell	Anti-Socialist	Hunter	NSW	1903	
	Frank Liddell	Liberal	Hunter	NSW	1903	
	John Livingston	Anti-Socialist	Barker	SA	1906	
	John Livingston	Liberal	Barker	SA	1906	
	Sir William Lyne	Protectionist	Hume	NSW	1901	• Deputy Leader of The Protectionist Party from 24 September 1903 to 26 May 1909 • Minister for Trade and Customs from 5 July 1905 to 30 July 1907 • Treasure from 30 July 1907 13 November 1908
	Sir William Lyne	Independent	Hume	NSW	1901	• Deputy Leader of The Protectionist Party from 24 September 1903 to 26 May 1909 • Minister for Trade and Customs from 5 July 1905 to 30 July 1907 • Treasure from 30 July 1907 13 November 1908
	Hugh Mahon	Labour	Coolgardie	WA	1901	• Minister for Home Affairs from 13 November 1908 to 2 June 1909
	William Maloney	Labour	Melbourne	Vic	1906	
	James Mathews	Labour	Melbourne Ports	Vic	1906	
	Samuel Mauger	Protectionist	Maribyrnong †	Vic	1901	• Minister without Portfolio from 12 October 1906 to 30 July 1907 • Postmaster-General from 30 July 1907 to 13 November 1908
	Samuel Mauger	Liberal	Maribyrnong †	Vic	1901	• Minister without Portfolio from 12 October 1906 to 30 July 1907 • Postmaster-General from 30 July 1907 to 13 November 1908
	Charles McDonald	Labour	Kennedy	Qld	1901	• Chairmen of Committee from 20 June 1906 to 19 February 1910
	John McDougall	Labour	Wannon	Vic	1906	
	William McWilliams *	Anti-Socialist	Franklin	Tas	1903	
	William McWilliams *	Liberal	Franklin	Tas	1903	
	King O'Malley	Labour	Darwin	Tas	1901	
	Jim Page	Labour	Maranoa	Qld	1901	
	Albert Palmer	Anti-Socialist	Echuca	Vic	1906	
	Albert Palmer	Liberal	Echuca	Vic	1906	
	Alexander Poynton *	Labour	Grey	SA	1901	
	Sir John Quick	Independent	Bendigo	Vic	1901	• Postmaster-General from 2 June 1909 to 29 April 1910
	Sir John Quick	Liberal	Bendigo	Vic	1901	• Postmaster-General from 2 June 1909 to 29 April 1910
	George Reid	Anti-Socialist	East Sydney	NSW	1901	• Leader of the Opposition from 5 July 1905 to 16 November 1908 • Leader of the Anti-Socialist Party from 18 November 1891 to 16 November 1908
	George Reid	Liberal	East Sydney	NSW	1901	• Leader of the Opposition from 5 July 1905 to 16 November 1908 • Leader of the Anti-Socialist Party from 18 November 1891 to 16 November 1908
	Carty Salmon	Protectionist	Laanecoorie	Vic	1901	• Speaker of the House of Representatives from 28 July 1909 to 19 February 1910
	Carty Salmon	Liberal	Laanecoorie	Vic	1901	• Speaker of the House of Representatives from 28 July 1909 to 19 February 1910
	Sydney Sampson	Independent	Wimmera	Vic	1906	
	Sydney Sampson	Liberal	Wimmera	Vic	1906	
	Hugh Sinclair	Anti-Socialist	Moreton	Qld	1906	
	Hugh Sinclair	Liberal	Moreton	Qld	1906	
	Bruce Smith	Anti-Socialist	Parkes	NSW	1901	
	Bruce Smith	Liberal	Parkes	NSW	1901	
	William Spence	Labour	Darling	NSW	1901	
	David Storrer	Protectionist	Bass	Tas	1901	
	David Storrer	Independent	Bass	Tas	1901	
	Josiah Thomas	Labour	Barrier	NSW	1901	• Postmaster-General from 13 November 1908 to 2 June 1909
	Dugald Thomson *	Anti-Socialist	North Sydney	NSW	1901	
	Dugald Thomson *	Liberal	North Sydney	NSW	1901	
	John Thomson	Protectionist	Cowper	NSW	1906	
	John Thomson	Liberal	Cowper	NSW	1906	
	Frank Tudor	Labour	Yarra	Vic	1901	• Minister for Trade and Customs from 13 November 1908 to 2 June 1909 • Chief Labour Whip of the House from 12 June 1901 to 12 November 1908
	David Watkins	Labour	Newcastle	NSW	1901	• Chief Labour Whip of the House from 12 November 1908 to 8 July 1913 • Chief Government Whip of the House from 13 November 1908 to 2 June 1909
	Chris Watson	Labour	South Sydney	NSW	1901	• Leader of the Labour Party from 20 May 1901 to 30 October 1907
	William Webster	Labour	Gwydir	NSW	1903	
	William Wilks	Anti-Socialist	Dalley	NSW	1901	• Chief Opposition Whip of the House from 5 July 1905 to 20 February 1907
	William Wilks	Liberal	Dalley	NSW	1901	• Chief Opposition Whip of the House from 5 July 1905 to 20 February 1907
	Henry Willis	Anti-Socialist	Robertson	NSW	1901	
	Henry Willis	Liberal	Robertson	NSW	1901	
	John Gratton Wilson	Anti-Socialist	Corangamite	Vic	1903	
	John Gratton Wilson	Liberal	Corangamite	Vic	1903	
	George Wise	Protectionist	Gippsland	Vic	1906	
	George Wise	Independent	Gippsland	Vic	1906	
	Agar Wynne	Independent	Balaclava	Vic	1906	
	Agar Wynne	Liberal	Balaclava	Vic	1906	

== Notes ==
* These candidates were elected unopposed.
† These Divisions were created at the 1906 redistribution.

1. The Anti-Socialists were known as the Free Trade Party before the 1906 election. In 1909, the Anti-Socialists, the Protectionists and the Western Australia Party merged to form the Commonwealth Liberal Party.
2. In 1908 the Labor Party became officially known as the Australian Labour Party (ALP).
3. Thomas Brown was first elected in 1901 to the Division of Canobolas, which was abolished at the 1906 redistribution.
4. John Chanter rejected the Commonwealth Liberal Party merger and joined the ALP.
5. There was no national Protectionist Party organisation in 1906. Members categorised as "Protectionist" were those who accepted the leadership of Alfred Deakin.
6. George Fairbairn was endorsed by the Anti-Socialists, but campaigned as an independent Protectionist. He did not sit with the Anti-Socialists.
7. The two Western Australia Party members were considered to be independent conservatives.
8. James Fowler defected from the ALP to the Commonwealth Liberal Party at the time of the merger.
9. Frederick Holder died in 1909. He was replaced at a by-election on 28 August 1909 by Richard Foster a Commonwealth Liberal Party candidate.
10. Charles Kingston died in 1908. He was replaced at a by-election on 13 June 1908 by Ernest Roberts, a Labor candidate.
11. Sir William Lyne rejected the Commonwealth Liberal Party merger and became an independent.
12. Samuel Mauger was first elected in 1901 to the Division of Melbourne Ports, which was abolished at the 1906 redistribution.
13. In 1907 Albert Palmer's election was declared void. He was re-elected in a by-election on 10 July 1907.
14. John Quick was endorsed by the Anti-Socialists, but sat as an independent.
15. Sydney Sampson was endorsed by the Anti-Socialists, but sat as an independent.
16. David Storrer rejected the Commonwealth Liberal Party merger and became an independent.
17. Chris Watson was first elected in 1901 to the Division of Bland, which was abolished at the 1906 redistribution.
18. George Wise rejected the Commonwealth Liberal Party merger and became an independent.
