= Deakin Ministry =

Deakin Ministry may refer to:

- First Deakin Ministry
- Second Deakin Ministry
- Third Deakin Ministry
