= Members of the Australian Senate, 1904–1906 =

Members of the Australian Senate, 1904-1906
- ←1901-1903 1907-1910→
- Senate composition at 1 January 1904 Protectionist (8) Labour (14) Anti-Socialist (12) Tariff Reform (1) Independent (1)

This is a list of members of the Australian Senate from 1904 to 1906. Half of its members were elected at the March 1901 election and had terms deemed to start on 1 January 1901 and finishing on 31 December 1906; the other half were elected at the 16 December 1903 election and had terms starting on 1 January 1904 and finishing on 30 June 1910, extended as a result of the 1906 referendum, which changed Senate terms to finish on 30 June, rather than 31 December. Parties reflect those acknowledged at the time of the 1904 election (Note: Prior to the 1906 election the Free Trade Party renamed itself the Anti-Socialist Party.)

Images	Senator	Party	State	Term ending	Years in office	portfolio
	Sir Richard Baker	Free Trade	South Australia	31 December 1906	1901–1906	• President of the Senate from 9 May 1901 to 31 December 1906
	Robert Best	Protectionist	Victoria	30 June 1910	1901–1910	• Chairman of Committees from 9 May 1901 to 31 December 1903
	John Clemons	Free Trade	Tasmania	31 December 1906	1901–1914	• Chief Opposition Whip in the Senate from 21 May 1901 to 18 August 1904 and from 5 July 1905 to 21 November 1907 • Chief Government Whip in the Senate from 18 August 1904 to 5 July 1905
	John Croft	Labour	Western Australia	30 June 1910	1904–1910	
	Anderson Dawson	Labour	Queensland	31 December 1906	1901–1906	• Minister for Defence from 27 April 1904 to 18 August 1904
	Henry Dobson	Tariff Reform	Tasmania	30 June 1910	1901–1910	
	Henry Dobson	Free Trade	Tasmania	30 June 1910	1901–1910	
	James Drake	Protectionist	Queensland	31 December 1906	1901–1906	• Attorney-General from 24 September 1903 to 27 April 1904 • Vice-President of the Executive Council from 18 August 1904 to 5 July 1905
	Edward Findley	Labour	Victoria	30 June 1910	1904–1917, 1923–1929	
	Simon Fraser	Protectionist	Victoria	31 December 1906	1901–1913	
	Thomas Givens	Labour	Queensland	30 June 1910	1904–1928	
	Albert Gould	Free Trade	New South Wales	31 December 1906	1901–1917	
	John Gray	Free Trade	New South Wales	30 June 1910	1904–1910	
	Robert Guthrie	Labour	South Australia	30 June 1910	1904–1921	
	George Henderson	Labour	Western Australia	30 June 1910	1904–1923	
	William Higgs	Labour	Queensland	31 December 1906	1901–1906	• Chairman of Committees from 16 March 1904 to 31 December 1906
	John Keating	Protectionist	Tasmania	31 December 1906	1901–1923	• Chief Government Whip in the Senate from 30 April 1902 to 27 April 1904 • Minister without Portfolio from 5 July 1905 to 12 October 1906 • Vice-President of the Executive Council from 12 October 1906 to 30 July 1907
	Hugh de Largie	Labour	Western Australia	30 June 1910	1901–1923	
	James Macfarlane	Free Trade	Tasmania	30 June 1910	1901–1910	
	Alexander Matheson	Free Trade	Western Australia	31 December 1906	1901–1906	
	Gregor McGregor	Labour	South Australia	30 June 1910	1901–1914	• Deputy Leader of the Labour Party from 20 May 1901 to 30 July 1914 • Vice-President of the Executive Council from 27 April 1904 to 18 August 1904 • Leader of the Government in the Senate from 27 April 1904 to 18 August 1904 • Leader of the Opposition in the Senate from 18 August 1904 to 5 July 1905
	Edward Millen	Free Trade	New South Wales	31 December 1906	1901–1923	
	Edward Mulcahy	Protectionist	Tasmania	30 June 1910	1904–1910, 1919–1920	
	John Neild	Free Trade	New South Wales	30 June 1910	1901–1910	
	David O'Keefe	Labour	Tasmania	31 December 1906	1901–1906, 1910–1920	• Chief Labour Whip in the Sanete from 19 April 1904 to 20 February 1907 • Chief Government Whip in the Senate from 27 April 1904 to 18 August 1904
	George Pearce	Labour	Western Australia	31 December 1906	1901–1938	
	Thomas Playford	Protectionist	South Australia	31 December 1906	1901–1906	• Vice-President of the Executive Council from 24 September 1903 to 27 April 1904 • Leader of the Government in the Senate from 24 September 1903 to 27 April 1904 and from 5 July 1905 to 31 December 1906 • Minister for Defence from 5 July 1905 to 31 December 1906 • Leader of the Protectionist Party in the Senate from 24 September 1903 to 31 December 1906
	Edward Pulsford	Free Trade	New South Wales	30 June 1910	1901–1910	
	Staniforth Smith	Free Trade	Western Australia	31 December 1906	1901–1906	
	James Stewart	Labour	Queensland	30 June 1910	1901–1917	Chief Labour Whip in the Sanete from 21 May 1901 to 29 April 1904
	William Story	Labour	South Australia	30 June 1910	1904–1917	
	James Styles	Protectionist	Victoria	31 December 1906	1901–1906	
	Sir Josiah Symon	Free Trade	South Australia	31 December 1906	1901–1913	• Attorney-General from 18 August 1904 to 5 July 1905 • Leader of the Government in the Senate from 18 August 1904 to 5 July 1905 • Leader of the Opposition in the Senate from 6 June 1901 to 18 August 1904 and from 5 July 1905 to 21 November 1907 • Leader of the Free Trade Party in the Senate from 6 June 1901 to 21 November 1907
	William Trenwith	Independent (Note: William Trenwith, was a former trade union official and leader of the Victorian Labour Party who was an independent because of his refusal to pledge to vote as directed by the Labour Party.)	Victoria	30 June 1910	1904–1910	
	Harry Turley	Labour	Queensland	30 June 1910	1904–1917	
	James Walker	Free Trade	New South Wales	31 December 1906	1901–1913	
	Sir William Zeal	Protectionist	Victoria	31 December 1906	1901–1906	
