= Electoral results for the Division of Southern Melbourne =

Australian division election results

This is a list of electoral results for the Division of Southern Melbourne in Australian federal elections from the division's creation in 1901 until its abolition in 1906.

== Members ==
Member	Party	Term
James Ronald	Labour	1901–1906
James Ronald	Independent	1906–1906

== Election results ==
=== Elections in the 1900s ===
==== 1903 ====
1903 Australian federal election: Southern Melbourne
Party	Candidate	Votes	%	±%
Labour	James Ronald	9,057	47.7	+6.8
Ind. Protectionist	Charles Monteith	8,282	43.6	+43.6
Ind. Protectionist	Ernest Joske	1,066	5.6	+5.6
Ind. Protectionist	John Sloss	600	3.2	+3.2
Total formal votes		19,005	98.0	
Informal votes		390	2.0	
Turnout		19,395	54.2	
Labour hold		Swing	−4.0	

==== 1901 ====
1901 Australian federal election: Southern Melbourne
Party	Candidate	Votes	%	±%
Labour	James Ronald	3,211	40.9	+40.9
Protectionist	Donald McArthur	2,256	28.8	+28.8
Free Trade	Alexander Sutherland	1,865	23.8	+23.8
Ind. Protectionist	David Gaunson	513	6.5	+6.5
Total formal votes		7,845	99.0	
Informal votes		77	1.0	
Turnout		7,922	62.0	
Labour win		(new seat)		
