= Members of the Australian Senate, 1907–1910 =

Members of the Australian Senate, 1907-1910
- ←1904-1906 1910-1913→
- Composition 1907-1909 Government (18) - (1 seat minority); Protectionist (3) Labour (15) Opposition (17); Anti-Socialist (17) Crossbench (1); Independent (1) Composition 1909-1910; Government (19) - (1 seat majority); Liberal (19) Opposition (15); Labour (15) Crossbench (2) Independent (2)

This is a list of members of the Australian Senate from 1907 to 1910. Half of its members were elected in the 16 December 1903 election, with terms starting on 1 January 1904 and finishing on 30 June 1910; the other half were elected in the 12 December 1906 election with terms starting on 1 January 1907 and finishing on 30 June 1913. They had extended terms as a result of the 1906 referendum, which changed Senate terms to finish on 30 June, rather than 31 December.

In May 1909, the Anti-Socialist Party (previously Free Trade) and most of the Protectionist Party merged to become the Commonwealth Liberal Party. (Note: Changes to the Senate in chronological order were Vardon's election declared void, (Note: The election of Anti-Socialist senator Joseph Vardon was declared void on 31 May 1907;) O'Loughlin's was appointed, (Note: On 11 July 1907 Labour member James O'Loghlin was appointed to the casual vacancy to replace Joseph Vardon and would only have held office until the earlier of the next election for the House of Representatives or the Senate.) O'Loughlin's appointment declared void, (Note: On 20 December 1907 O'Loghlin's appointment was declared void.) and Vardon was elected. (Note: A special election was held on 15 February 1908, when Vardon defeated O'Loghlin for the seat.))

Images	Senator	Party	State	Term ending	Years in office	Portfolio
	Robert Best	Protectionist	Victoria	1910	1901–1910	• Vice-President of the Executive Council from 30 July 1905 to 13 November 1908 • Leader of the Government in the Senate from 20 February 1907 to 13 November 1908 • Minister for Trade and Customs from 2 June 1909 to 29 April 1910 • Leader of the Protectionist Party in the Senate from 20 February 1907 to 26 May 1909
	Robert Best	Liberal	Victoria	1910	1901–1910	• Vice-President of the Executive Council from 30 July 1905 to 13 November 1908 • Leader of the Government in the Senate from 20 February 1907 to 13 November 1908 • Minister for Trade and Customs from 2 June 1909 to 29 April 1910 • Leader of the Protectionist Party in the Senate from 20 February 1907 to 26 May 1909
	Cyril Cameron	Anti-Socialist	Tasmania	1913	1901–1903, 1907–1913	
	Cyril Cameron	Liberal	Tasmania	1913	1901–1903, 1907–1913	
	Thomas Chataway	Anti-Socialist	Queensland	1913	1907–1913	
	Thomas Chataway	Liberal	Queensland	1913	1907–1913	
	John Clemons	Anti-Socialist	Tasmania	1913	1901–1914	
	John Clemons	Liberal	Tasmania	1913	1901–1914	
	John Croft	Labour	Western Australia	1910	1904–1910	
	Hugh de Largie	Labour	Western Australia	1910	1901–1923	• Chief Labour Whip in the Senate from 20 February 1907 to 18 September 1914 • Chief Government whip in the Senate from 13 November 1908 to 2 June 1909
	Henry Dobson	Anti-Socialist	Tasmania	1910	1901–1910	• Chairman of Committees from 25 November 1908 to 30 June 1910
	Henry Dobson	Liberal	Tasmania	1910	1901–1910	• Chairman of Committees from 25 November 1908 to 30 June 1910
	Edward Findley	Labour	Victoria	1910	1904–1917, 1923–1929	
	Simon Fraser	Anti-Socialist	Victoria	1913	1901–1913	
	Simon Fraser	Liberal	Victoria	1913	1901–1913	
	Thomas Givens	Labour	Queensland	1910	1904–1928	
	Albert Gould	Anti-Socialist	New South Wales	1913	1901–1917	• President of the Senate from 20 February 1907 to 30 June 1910
	Albert Gould	Liberal	New South Wales	1913	1901–1917	• President of the Senate from 20 February 1907 to 30 June 1910
	John Gray	Anti-Socialist	New South Wales	1910	1901–1910	
	John Gray	Liberal	New South Wales	1910	1901–1910	
	Robert Guthrie	Labour	South Australia	1910	1904–1921	
	George Henderson	Labour	Western Australia	1910	1904–1923	
	John Keating	Protectionist	Tasmania	1913	1901–1923	• Vice-President of the Executive Coucil from 12 October 1906 to 30 July 1907 • Minister for Home Affairs from 24 January 1907 to 13 November 1908
	John Keating	Liberal	Tasmania	1913	1901–1923	• Vice-President of the Executive Coucil from 12 October 1906 to 30 July 1907 • Minister for Home Affairs from 24 January 1907 to 13 November 1908
	Patrick Lynch	Labour	Western Australia	1913	1907–1938	
	James Macfarlane	Anti-Socialist	Tasmania	1910	1901–1910	
	James Macfarlane	Liberal	Tasmania	1910	1901–1910	
	James McColl	Anti-Socialist	Victoria	1913	1907–1914	
	James McColl	Liberal	Victoria	1913	1907–1914	
	Gregor McGregor	Labour	South Australia	1910	1901–1914	• Deputy Leader of the Labour Party from 20 May 1901 to 30 July 1914 • Vice-President of the Executive Council from 13 November 1908 to 2 June 1909 • Leader of the Government in the Senate from 13 November 1908 to 2 June 1909
	Edward Millen	Anti-Socialist	New South Wales	1913	1901–1923	• Vice-President of the Executive Council from 2 June 1909 to 29 April 1910 • Leader of the Government in the Senate from 2 June 1909 to 29 April 1910 • Leader of the Liberal Party from 27 May 1909 to 22 February 1917 • Leader of the Opposition in the Senate from 21 November 1907 to 2 June 1909
	Edward Millen	Liberal	New South Wales	1913	1901–1923	• Vice-President of the Executive Council from 2 June 1909 to 29 April 1910 • Leader of the Government in the Senate from 2 June 1909 to 29 April 1910 • Leader of the Liberal Party from 27 May 1909 to 22 February 1917 • Leader of the Opposition in the Senate from 21 November 1907 to 2 June 1909
	Edward Mulcahy	Protectionist	Tasmania	1910	1901–1910, 1919–1920	
	Edward Mulcahy	Liberal	Tasmania	1910	1901–1910, 1919–1920	
	Ted Needham	Labour	Western Australia	1913	1907–1920, 1923–1929	
	John Neild	Anti-Socialist	New South Wales	1910	1901–1910	
	John Neild	Liberal	New South Wales	1910	1901–1910	
	James O'Loghlin	Labour	South Australia	casual	1907, 1913–1920, 1923–1925	
	George Pearce	Labour	Western Australia	1913	1901–1938	• Minister for Defence from 13 November 1908 to 2 June 1909 • Chairman of Committee from 21 February to 13 November 1908
	Edward Pulsford	Anti-Socialist	New South Wales	1910	1901–1910	
	Edward Pulsford	Liberal	New South Wales	1910	1901–1910	
	Edward Russell	Labour	Victoria	1913	1907–1925	
	William Russell	Labour	South Australia	1913	1907–1913	
	Anthony St Ledger	Anti-Socialist	Queensland	1913	1907–1913	
	Anthony St Ledger	Liberal	Queensland	1913	1907–1913	
	Robert Sayers	Anti-Socialist	Queensland	1913	1907–1913	
	Robert Sayers	Liberal	Queensland	1913	1907–1913	
	James Stewart	Labour	Queensland	1910	1901–1917	
	William Story	Labour	South Australia	1910	1904–1917	
	Sir Josiah Symon	Anti-Socialist	South Australia	1913	1901–1913	• Leader of the Opposition in the Senate from 5 July to 21 November 1907 • Leader of the Free Trade Party in the Senate from 6 June 1901 to 21 November 1907
	Sir Josiah Symon	Independent	South Australia	1913	1901–1913	• Leader of the Opposition in the Senate from 5 July to 21 November 1907 • Leader of the Free Trade Party in the Senate from 6 June 1901 to 21 November 1907
	William Trenwith	Independent (Note: William Trenwith, was a former trade union official and leader of the Victorian Labour Party who was an independent because of his refusal to pledge to vote as directed by the Labour Party.)	Victoria	1910	1904–1910	
	William Trenwith	Liberal	Victoria	1910	1904–1910	
	Harry Turley	Labour	Queensland	1910	1904–1917	
	Joseph Vardon	Anti-Socialist	South Australia	1913	1907, 1908–1913	
	Joseph Vardon	Liberal	South Australia	1913	1907, 1908–1913	
	James Walker	Anti-Socialist	New South Wales	1913	1901–1913	
	James Walker	Liberal	New South Wales	1913	1901–1913	

== Bibliography ==
- Journals of the Senate. Parliament of Australia. 1907.
- "Members of the Senate since 1901". Parliamentary Handbook. Parliament of Australia. Archived from the original on 25 July 2008.
