= 1906 Australian federal election =

Election for the 3rd Parliament of Australia

- 12 December 1906

All 75 seats in the House of Representatives 38 seats were needed for a majority in the House 18 (of the 36) seats in the Senate
- Registered: 2,109,562 ▲11.41%
- Turnout: 1,001,593 (47.48%) (Note: Turnout in contested seats was 51.48%.) (▲8.43 pp)
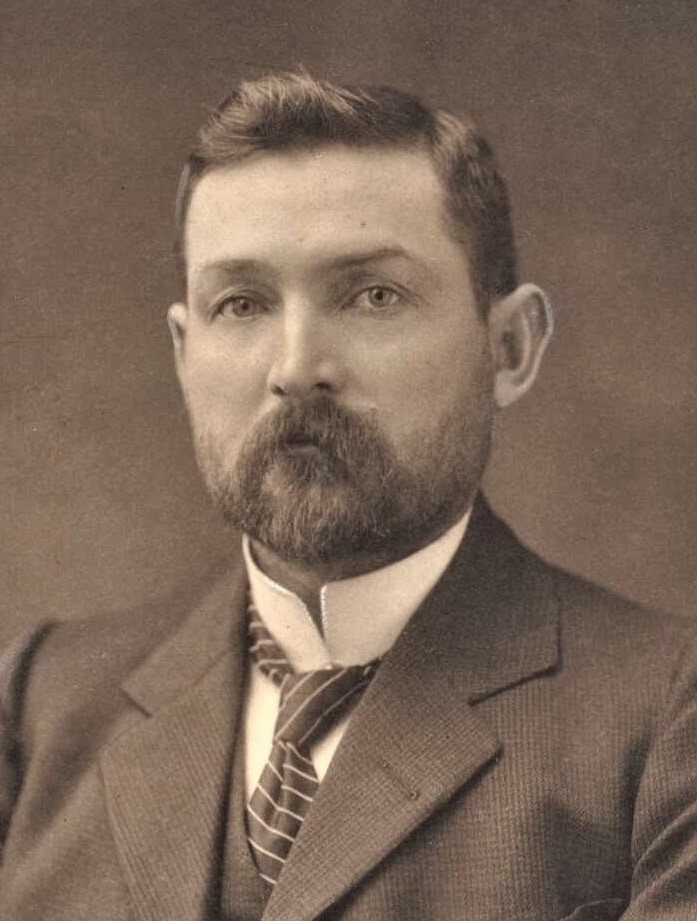

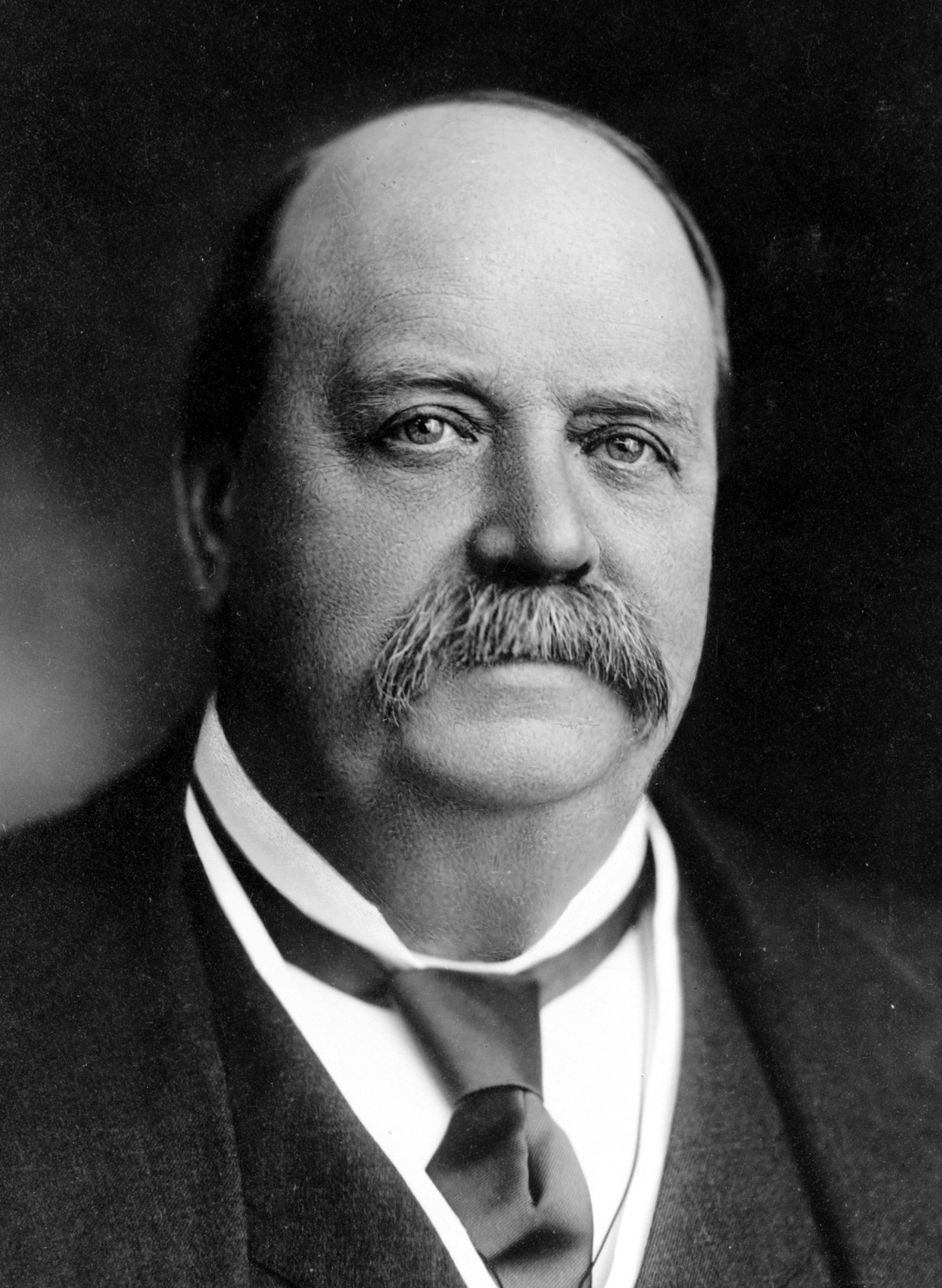

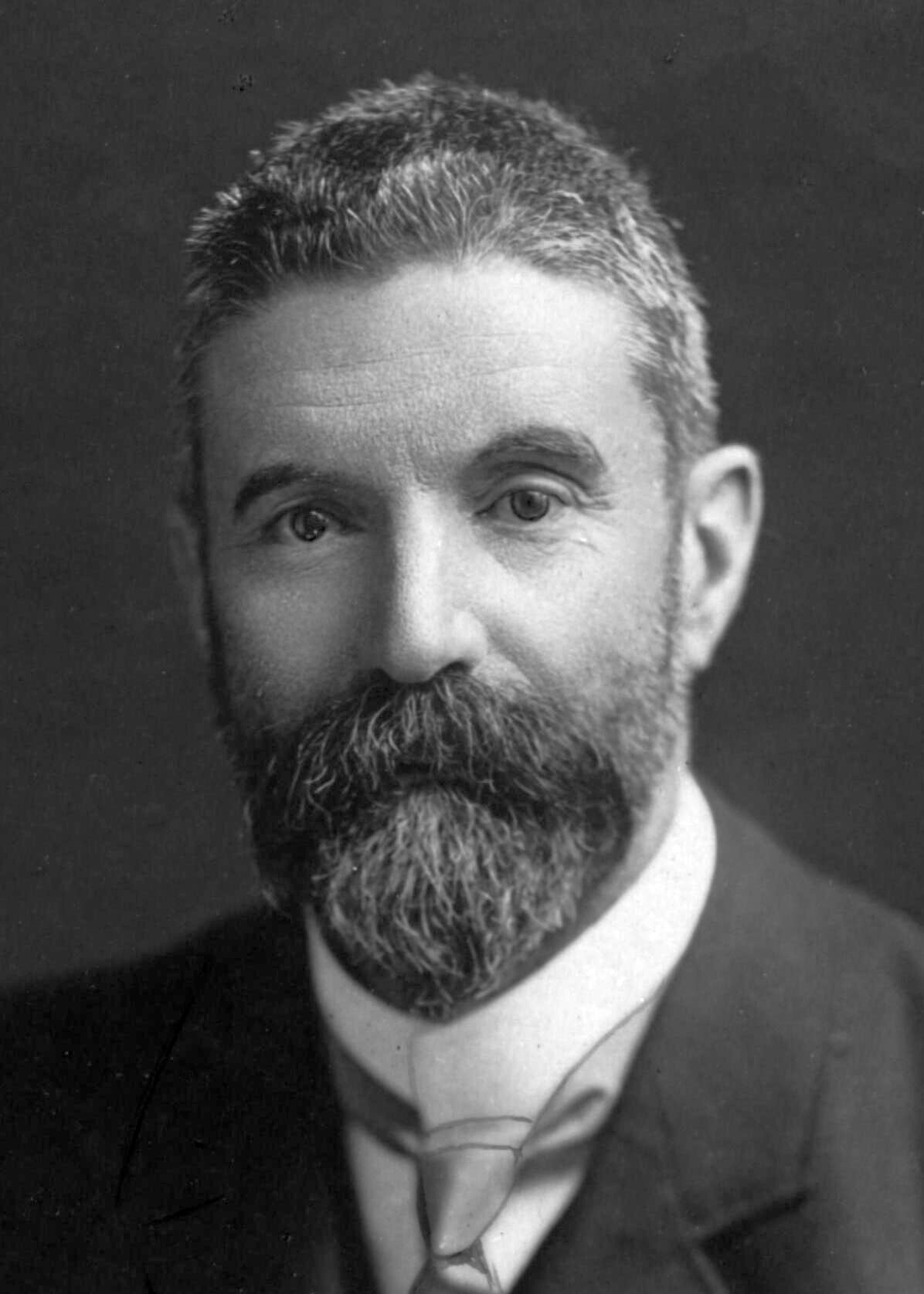

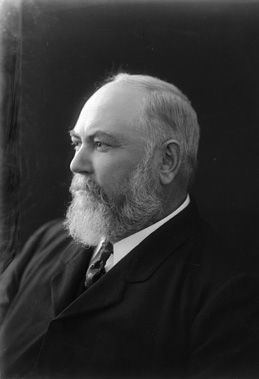
	First party	Second party
Leader	Chris Watson	George Reid
Party	Labour	Anti-Socialist
Leader since	20 May 1901	11 May 1901
Leader's seat	South Sydney (NSW)	East Sydney (NSW)
Last election	22 seats	24 seats
Seats won	26 seats	26 seats
Seat change	▲4	▲2
Popular vote	348,712	345,781
Percentage	36.64%	36.33%
Swing	▲6.86%	▲4.60%
	Third party	Fourth party
Leader	Alfred Deakin	John Forrest
Party	Protectionist	Western Australian Party
Leader since	24 September 1903	1906
Leader's seat	Ballaarat (Vic.)	Swan (WA)
Last election	26 seats	New party
Seats won	16 seats	2 seats
Seat change	▼10	▲2
Popular vote	155,991	22,154
Percentage	16.39%	2.33%
Swing	▼12.84%	▲2.33%
- Results by division for the House of Representatives, shaded by winning party's margin of victory.
Prime Minister before election
Alfred Deakin
Protectionist
Subsequent Prime Minister
Alfred Deakin
Protectionist

The 1906 Australian federal election was held in Australia on 12 December 1906. All 75 seats in the House of Representatives, and 18 of the 36 seats in the Senate were up for election. The incumbent Protectionist Party minority government led by Prime Minister Alfred Deakin retained government, despite winning the fewest House of Representatives votes and seats of the three parties. Parliamentary support was provided by the Labour Party led by Chris Watson, while the Anti-Socialist Party (renamed from the Free Trade Party), led by George Reid, remained in opposition.

Watson resigned as Labour leader in October 1907 and was replaced by Andrew Fisher. The Protectionist minority government fell in November 1908 to Labour, and a few days later Reid resigned as Anti-Socialist leader, being replaced by Joseph Cook. The Labour minority government fell in June 1909 to the newly formed Commonwealth Liberal Party led by Deakin; this Party was formed on a shared anti-Labour platform as a merger organised between Deakin, the leader of the Protectionists, and Cook, the leader of the Anti-Socialists, to counter Labour's growing popularity. The merger did not sit well with several of the more progressive Protectionists, who defected to Labour or sat as independents.

The merger would allow the Deakin Commonwealth Liberals to construct a mid-term parliamentary majority, however less than a year later, at the 1910 election, Labour won both majority government and a Senate majority, representing a number of firsts: it was Australia's first elected federal majority government, Australia's first elected Senate majority, the world's first Labour Party majority government at a national level, and after the 1904 Watson minority government, the world's second Labour Party government at a national level.

== Results ==
=== House of Representatives ===
Labour: 26 seats Protectionist: 16 seats Anti-Socialist: 26 seats Independent: 6 seats Western Australian: 1 seat

House of Reps 1906–10 (FPTP) – Turnout 51.48% (Non-CV) – Informal 3.73%
Party	Votes	%	Swing	Seats	Change
Labour	348,712	36.64	+6.86	26	+4
Anti-Socialist (Note: Anti-Socialist party figures for the House of Representatives do not include Frederick Holder (Wakefield, SA) who was endorsed by the party, since he was the Speaker for his entire parliamentary career and did not take part in Anti-Socialist party activities.)	345,781	36.33	+4.60	26	+2
Protectionist	155,991	16.39	–12.84	16	–10
Western Australian	22,154	2.33	+2.33	2	+2
Independents/Other	79,051	8.31	−0.46	5	+3
Total	951,689 (Note: Seven members of the House of Representatives were elected unopposed – three Anti-Socialist, three Labour, and one Protectionist.)			75	
Protectionist/Labour	Win			42	−6
Anti-Socialist				26	+2

Popular vote
Labour	36.64%
Anti-Socialist	36.33%
Protectionist	16.39%
Western Australian	2.33%
Independent	8.31%

Parliament seats
Labour	34.7%
Anti-Socialist	34.7%
Protectionist	21.3%
Western Australian	2.6%
Independent	6.7%

=== Senate ===
Senate 1906–10 (FPTP BV) – Turnout 50.21% (Non-CV) – Informal N/A
Party	Votes	%	Swing	Seats won	Seats held	Change
Anti-Socialist (Note: The figures for the Anti-Socialist Party include Joseph Vardon (SA), whose election was subsequently declared void, and Henry Dobson (Tas), who was elected as part of the Revenue Tariff Party.)	469,917	47.4	+15.6	12	17	+4
Labour	384,171	38.7	+5.7	5	15	+1
Protectionist	92,931	9.4	−6.7	1	3	−5
Independents/Other (Note: Independent: William Trenwith (Vic))	44,871	4.5		0	1	0
Total	991,850			18	36	

== Significance ==
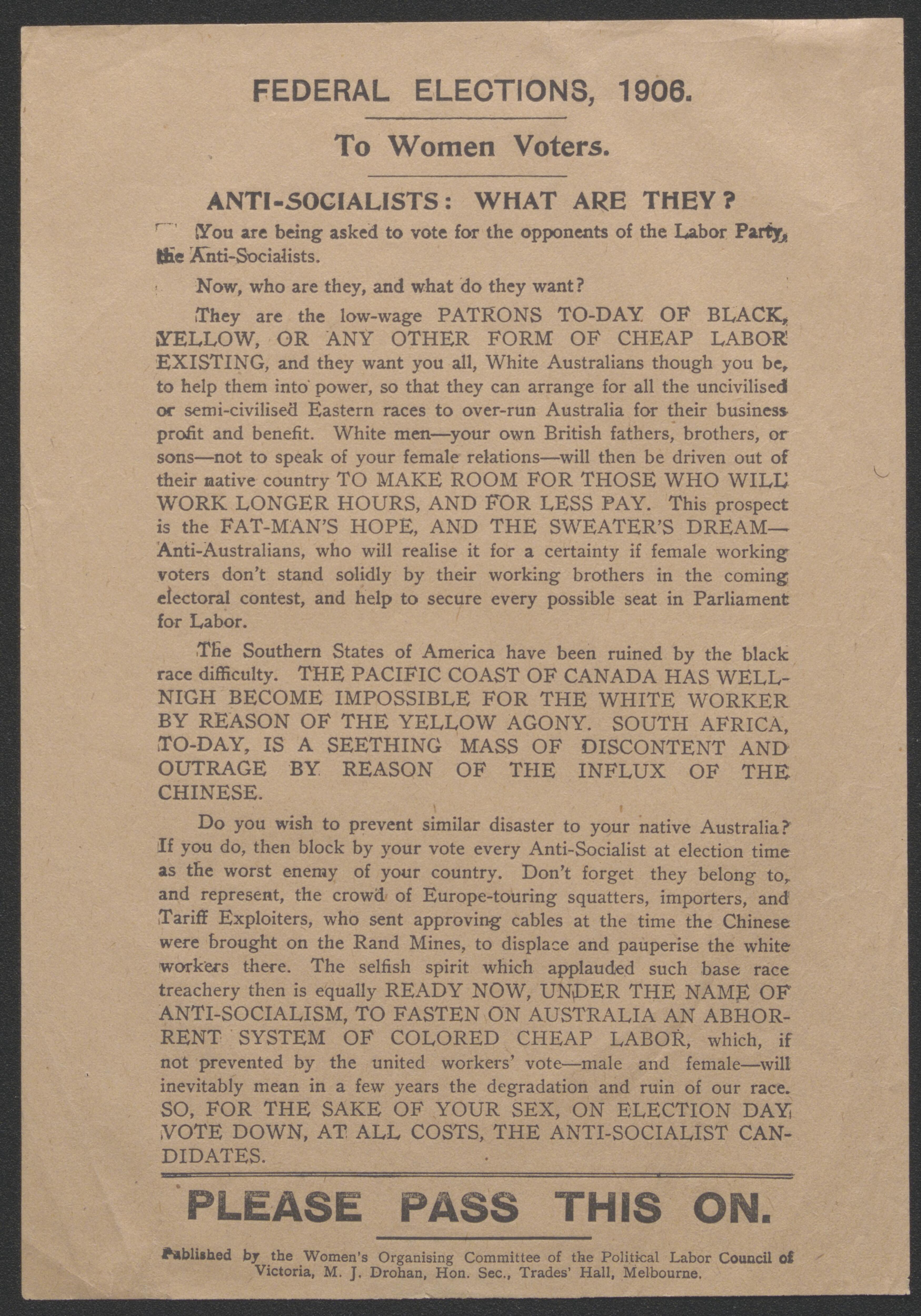
Campaign material used by the Labor Party at the 1906 election, targeting female voters

It was the third federal election in Australia following the adoption of the federal government. The election was largely important as it would demonstrate which of the parties (if any) could hold together a stable government after the unstable second term of the previous one, which saw four different governments in power. It would also see if all parties could survive the implementation of protectionist policies which differentiated the two. This was also the first election where all seats for the House of Representatives were voted for via a First-past-the-post system (at previous elections some states voted as one electorate, using a bloc vote), and the first time that Tasmania was divided into separate electorates. The election result was the continuation of a Protectionist government led by Deakin and supported by Labour, which remained in power largely due to the unwillingness of the Anti-Socialist Party to support a vote of no confidence against it.

George Reid adopted a strategy of trying to reorient the party system along Labour vs non-Labour lines – before the election, he renamed his Free Trade Party to the Anti-Socialist Party. Reid envisaged a spectrum running from socialist to anti-socialist, with the Protectionist Party in the middle. This attempt struck a chord with politicians who were steeped in the Westminster tradition and regarded a two-party system as very much the norm.

Since the Protectionist primary platform of government tariffs had been dealt with by previous governments, the party had become somewhat redundant. Those who remained were largely supporting the Party's leader, Alfred Deakin, rather than its policies. Of the three, the Labour Party, led by Chris Watson, now had the most realistic chance of becoming the dominant party after their gains in the 1903 election and after their leading status in the four minor states they were looking to make the same type of gains in Victoria and New South Wales.

The first federal referendum in Australia's history was held in conjunction with the election. The proposed alteration to the Constitution, to change the start date of Senators' terms from 1 January to 1 July, passed in all states and was carried.

== Seats changing hands ==
Seat	Pre-1906			Swing	Post-1906		
Seat	Party	Member	Margin	Swing	Margin	Member	Party
Balaclava, Vic	Protectionist	George Turner	100.0	41.8	4.0	Agar Wynne	Ind. Protectionist
Barker, SA	Protectionist	Langdon Bonython	100.0	58.1	8.1	John Livingston	Anti-Socialist
Batman, Vic	new division				1.7	Jabez Coon	Protectionist
Bendigo, Vic	Protectionist	John Quick	1.1	51.7	1.7	John Quick	Ind. Protectionist
Brisbane, Qld	Labour	Millice Culpin	2.1	13.4	11.3	Justin Foxton	Anti-Socialist
Capricornia, Qld	Labour	David Thomson	9.6	15.2	5.6	Edward Archer	Anti-Socialist
Cowper, NSW	Anti-Socialist	Henry Lee	13.0	13.9	0.9	John Thomson	Protectionist
Denison, Tas	Protectionist	Philip Fysh	0.2	15.1	10.5	Philip Fysh	Anti-Socialist
Fawkner, Vic	new division				13.9	George Fairbairn	Ind. Protectionist
Franklin, Tas	Revenue Tariff	William McWilliams	4.6	100.0	100.0	William McWilliams	Anti-Socialist
Fremantle, WA	Labour	William Carpenter	11.3	12.2	0.9	William Hedges	Western Australian
Indi, Vic	Protectionist	Isaac Isaacs	100.0	44.4	2.7	Joseph Brown	Anti-Socialist
Macquarie, NSW	Anti-Socialist	Sydney Smith	4.0	51.3	1.3	Ernest Carr	Labour
Maribyrnong, Vic	new division				6.9	Samuel Mauger	Protectionist
Melbourne Ports, Vic	Protectionist	Samuel Mauger	6.8	9.4	2.6	James Mathews	Labour
Moreton, Qld	Ind / Labour	James Wilkinson (Note: James Wilkinson (Moreton, Qld) was elected as an independent labour candidate and joined the Labour caucus in 1904.)	5.8	18.3	12.5	Hugh Sinclair	Anti-Socialist
New England, NSW	Anti-Socialist	Edmund Lonsdale	1.9	51.8	1.8	Frank Foster	Labour
Oxley, Qld	Protectionist	Richard Edwards	2.3	14.3	16.6	Richard Edwards	Anti-Socialist
South Sydney, NSW	Anti-Socialist	George Edwards	6.0	12.4	6.4	Chris Watson	Labour
Wannon, Vic	Anti-Socialist	Arthur Robinson	2.9	5.7	2.8	John McDougall	Labour
Werriwa, NSW	Anti-Socialist	Alfred Conroy	18.7	20.5	1.8	David Hall	Labour
Wimmera, Vic	Protectionist	Pharez Phillips	0.1	14.6	14.2	Sydney Sampson	Ind. Protectionist

- Members listed in italics did not contest their seat at this election.

== Post-election pendulum ==
Government seats
Protectionist/Labour Coalition
Marginal
Gippsland (Vic)	George Wise	PROT	00.3 vs AS
Calare (NSW)	Thomas Brown	LAB	00.7 vs AS
Cowper (NSW)	John Thomson	PROT	00.9 vs AS
Macquarie (NSW)	Ernest Carr	LAB	01.3 vs AS
Batman (Vic)	Jabez Coon	PROT	01.7 vs LAB
New England (NSW)	Frank Foster	LAB	01.8 vs AS
Werriwa (NSW)	David Hall	LAB	01.8 vs AS
Melbourne Ports (Vic)	James Mathews	LAB	02.6 vs PROT
Laanecoorie (Vic)	Carty Salmon	PROT	02.7 vs LAB
Perth (WA)	James Fowler	LAB	02.7 vs WAP
Wannon (Vic)	John McDougall	LAB	02.8 vs AS
Herbert (Qld)	Fred Bamford	LAB	02.9 vs AS
Cook (NSW)	James Catts	LAB	03.0 vs AS
Gwydir (NSW)	William Webster	LAB	03.3 vs AS
Riverina (NSW)	John Chanter	PROT	04.1 vs AS
Wide Bay (Qld)	Andrew Fisher	LAB	04.5 vs AS
Mernda (Vic)	Robert Harper	PROT	04.7 vs LAB
Corio (Vic)	Richard Crouch	PROT	05.0 vs AS
West Sydney (NSW)	Billy Hughes	LAB	05.5 vs AS
Fairly safe
South Sydney (NSW)	Chris Watson	LAB	06.4 vs AS
Bourke (Vic)	James Hume Cook	PROT	06.7 vs LAB
Maribyrnong (Vic)	Samuel Mauger	PROT	06.9 vs LAB
Kennedy (Qld)	Charles McDonald	LAB	07.8 vs AS
Darling (NSW)	William Spence	LAB	07.9 vs AS
Darwin (Tas)	King O'Malley	LAB	09.5 vs AS
Yarra (Vic)	Frank Tudor	LAB	09.6 vs IND
Safe
Melbourne (Vic)	William Maloney	LAB	10.4 vs AS
Hume (NSW)	William Lyne	PROT	11.7 vs AS
Bass (Tas)	David Storrer	PROT	12.3 vs AS
Darling Downs (Qld)	Littleton Groom	PROT	15.1 vs LAB
Ballaarat (Vic)	Alfred Deakin	PROT	16.2 vs LAB
Newcastle (NSW)	David Watkins	LAB	17.2 vs PAS
Eden-Monaro (NSW)	Austin Chapman	PROT	17.8 vs AS
Maranoa (Qld)	Jim Page	LAB	18.8 vs AS
Very safe
Coolgardie (WA)	Hugh Mahon	LAB	23.1 vs WAP
Barrier (NSW)	Josiah Thomas	LAB	24.5 vs AS
Richmond (NSW)	Thomas Ewing	PROT	26.4 vs AS
Kalgoorlie (WA)	Charlie Frazer	LAB	29.0 vs WAP
Adelaide (SA)	Charles Kingston	PROT	unopposed
Boothby (SA)	Lee Batchelor	LAB	unopposed
Grey (SA)	Alexander Poynton	LAB	unopposed
Hindmarsh (SA)	James Hutchison	LAB	unopposed

Non-government seats
Anti-Socialist Party
Marginal
Echuca (Vic)	Albert Palmer (Note: Palmer's election was subsequently declared void and he won the seat in a by-election with an increased majority.)	AS	00.0 vs PROT
Hunter (NSW)	Frank Liddell	AS	00.8 vs LAB
Flinders (Vic)	William Irvine	AS	01.5 vs PROT
Dalley (NSW)	William Wilks	AS	02.7 vs LAB
Indi (Vic)	Joseph Brown	AS	02.7 vs LAB
Wilmot (Tas)	Llewellyn Atkinson	AS	04.2 vs LAB
East Sydney (NSW)	George Reid	AS	04.9 vs LAB
Capricornia (Qld)	Edward Archer	AS	05.6 vs LAB
Grampians (Vic)	Hans Irvine	AS	05.8 vs LAB
Fairly safe
Corangamite (Vic)	Gratton Wilson	AS	06.6 vs PROT
Robertson (NSW)	Henry Willis	AS	07.0 vs LAB
Barker (SA)	John Livingston	AS	08.1 vs LAB
Safe
Denison (Tas)	Philip Fysh	AS	10.5 vs LAB
Brisbane (Qld)	Justin Foxton	AS	11.3 vs LAB
Kooyong (Vic)	William Knox	AS	12.0 vs PROT
Moreton (Qld)	Hugh Sinclair	AS	12.5 vs LAB
Nepean (NSW)	Eric Bowden	AS	13.3 vs LAB
Angas (SA)	Paddy Glynn	AS	13.6 vs LAB
Illawarra (NSW)	George Fuller	AS	13.8 vs LAB
Oxley (Qld)	Richard Edwards	AS	13.8 vs LAB
Wakefield (SA)	Frederick Holder	AS	13.8 vs LAB
Very safe
Lang (NSW)	Elliot Johnson	AS	20.4 vs LAB
Wentworth (NSW)	Willie Kelly	AS	23.2 vs LAB
Parkes (NSW)	Bruce Smith	AS	28.2 vs IND
Franklin (Tas)	William McWilliams	AS	unopposed
North Sydney (NSW)	Dugald Thomson	AS	unopposed
Parramatta (NSW)	Joseph Cook	AS	unopposed
Others
Fremantle (WA)	William Hedges	WAP	00.9 vs LAB
Bendigo (Vic)	John Quick	IND PROT	01.7 vs LAB
Balaclava (Vic)	Agar Wynne	IND PROT	04.0 vs IND
Fawkner (Vic)	George Fairbairn	IND PROT	13.9 vs LAB
Wimmera (Vic)	Sydney Sampson	IND PROT	14.2 vs LAB
Swan (WA)	John Forrest	WAP	16.2 vs LAB

== See also ==
- Candidates of the Australian federal election, 1906
- Members of the Australian House of Representatives, 1906–1910
- Members of the Australian Senate, 1907–1910
