= Division of Southern Melbourne =

Former Australian federal electoral division

Southern Melbourne Australian House of Representatives Division
- Created: 1901
- Abolished: 1906
- Namesake: Southern Melbourne

The Division of Southern Melbourne was an Australian electoral division in the state of Victoria. It was located in the inner southern area of Melbourne, and included the suburbs of Albert Park, St Kilda, South Melbourne and South Yarra.

The division was proclaimed in 1900, and was one of the original 65 divisions to be contested at the first federal election. At the redistribution of 13 July 1906, it was abolished and replaced by the Division of Fawkner, which was itself abolished in 1969.

== Members ==
Image	Member	Party	Term	Notes
	James Ronald (1861–1941)	Labour	29 March 1901 – 1906	Failed to win preselection for the Division of Melbourne Ports when Southern Melbourne was abolished in 1906
	James Ronald (1861–1941)	Independent	1906 – 12 December 1906	Failed to win preselection for the Division of Melbourne Ports when Southern Melbourne was abolished in 1906
