= James Ronald =

Australian politician

The Honourable Reverend James Ronald
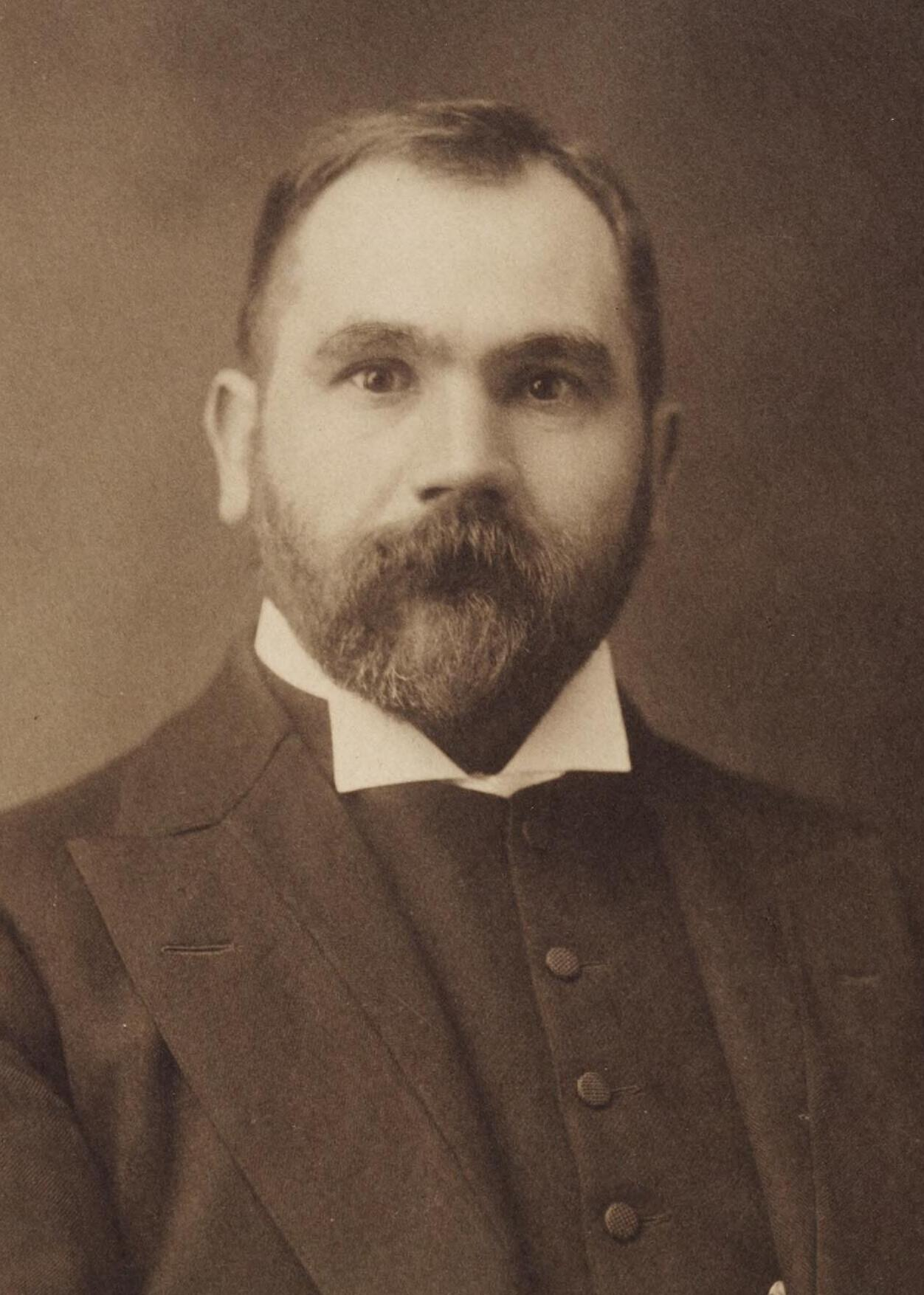

Member of the Australian Parliament for Southern Melbourne
- In office 29 March 1901 – 12 December 1906
- Preceded by: New seat
- Succeeded by: Division abolished

Personal details
- Born: 27 August 1861 Linlithgow, Scotland
- Died: 27 July 1941 (aged 79) Melbourne, Australia
- Party: Liberal (UK) (c. 1879); Labor (1898–1906); Nationalist (1917)
- Other political affiliations: Independent (1906, 1929)
- Occupation: Clergyman

James Black Ronald (27 August 1861 – 27 July 1941) was an Australian politician and Presbyterian minister. He was a member of the House of Representatives from 1901 to 1906, representing the seat of Southern Melbourne as one of the inaugural members of the Australian Labor Party (ALP). He unsuccessfully stood for re-election at the 1906 federal election as an independent, after losing ALP endorsement. He later spent over 15 years in unsuccessful litigation against his former parliamentary colleague and fellow Presbyterian Robert Harper.

== Early life ==
Ronald was born in Linlithgow, Scotland on 27 August 1861. He was reportedly born on the estate of the Earls of Hopetoun, and claimed to have been a childhood acquaintance of John Hope, 1st Marquess of Linlithgow, who became the first governor-general of Australia.

== Education and religious ministry ==
Ronald attended his local parish school and went on to study arts at the University of Edinburgh. After five years he gained entry to the New College to study divinity, becoming a licentiate of the Free Church of Scotland. Ronald immigrated to Australia in 1888 and undertook further training at the Theological Hall of the Presbyterian Church of Victoria. He was licensed as a Presbyterian Church minister in 1891 and subsequently served as a minister at Oakleigh for five years. In 1897 he took over the Clarendon Street Presbyterian Church in South Melbourne and was credited with reviving its attendance. He resigned his post upon his election to federal parliament in 1901.

== Politics ==
While in Scotland, Ronald was a supporter of Liberal Party leader William Ewart Gladstone and was reportedly involved with Gladstone's Midlothian campaign in 1879. After moving to Australia, he joined the South Melbourne branch of the Liberal and Labour League in 1898. At the inaugural federal election in 1901, he was elected to the House of Representatives as the member for Southern Melbourne. He was the only clergyman elected to the first federal parliament.

Ronald joined the parliamentary Australian Labor Party (ALP) upon its creation, reportedly as its only member with a university education. He was an outspoken supporter of the White Australia policy, during the 1901 election campaign calling for Chinese immigrants to be "either poll-axed or poll-taxed in such a mannrer as would make the country too hot for them"". He reportedly favoured a "snow-white Australia". During debate on the Commonwealth Franchise Bill in 1902, Ronald argued that Aboriginal Australians should not be automatically disenfranchised.

Ronald retained Southern Melbourne for the ALP at the 1903 federal election. His constituency was abolished prior to the 1906 election and he instead chose to stand for the nearby seat of Melbourne Ports. He sought ALP endorsement, despite initially being deemed ineligible after letting his local branch membership lapse, but in September 1906 was defeated for ALP preselection by James Mathews. Ronald attributed his defeat in part to the efforts of the Orange Order and called for its members to be banned from the ALP. He subsequently announced he would stand as an independent and publicly denounced the ALP. He failed to win re-election, placing third behind Mathews and the Protectionist Party candidate.

In 1917, following the Australian Labor Party split of 1916, Ronald joined the Nationalist Party and unsuccessfully sought preselection for Melbourne Ports. He made one final run for parliament at the 1929 federal election, standing unsuccessfully for the seat of Fawkner.

== Later life and legal dispute ==
In 1908, Ronald sued his fellow Presbyterian and former parliamentary colleague Robert Harper for slander and libel, seeking damages of £3,000 (equivalent to $480,000 in 2022). He had sought to return to the Presbysterian ministry after the end of his political career, but Harper had informed a committee of the Presbyterian Church that Ronald was an unsuitable candidate on the grounds that he had told "improper stories" while in parliament. The jury in the original Supreme Court of Victoria case ruled against Ronald and found that Harper had proven the truth of his statement, but not before several other members of parliament had been called as witnesses and another Presbyterian clergyman Patrick John Murdoch had been imprisoned for contempt of court. Ronald subsequently appealed to the full bench of the Supreme Court on the grounds that the presiding judge had misdirected the jury, without success. The High Court of Australia refused to hear a further appeal, ruling in the 1910 case Ronald v Harper that it had no authority to review any evidence not presented at the original trial.

After his defeat in court, Ronald alleged that several of Harper's witnesses had perjured themselves or unduly influenced other witnesses. In November 1909, William Harrison, a witness against Ronald, was convicted of perjury over his testimony and imprisoned for three months. A similar attempt to prosecute another witness, Patrick Kerrigan, failed when Ronald failed to get his own witnesses to appear at the committal hearing. In 1910, Patrick Hill was convicted of perjury and subornation of perjury. The Victorian government then charged Harper and several others with conspiring to defeat the ends of justice. Harper was found not guilty at the resulting trial, with the presiding judge directing the jury to acquit him and laying the responsibility for the tainted evidence with Hill. A further prosecution of witnesses several months later resulted in seven others being convicted of perjury and sentenced to two years' imprisonment.

In 1913, Ronald launched a renewed suit against Harper, seeking damages of £10,000 (equivalent to $1,370,000 in 2022) and to overturn the previous verdicts on the grounds of proven perjury. Both the Supreme Court and High Court refused to accept his case, finding that the outcome of the previous libel suit would have been the same even if the tainted evidence was excluded. He nonetheless continued his attempts at relitigation, unsuccessfully petitioning the state government to introduce legislation to allow him a second trial. In 1920, two years after Harper's death, Ronald travelled to England to petition King George VI to intervene on his behalf, citing his rights under the Magna Carta and requesting restitution of his seat in parliament, restitution to his church ministry, and compensation from Harper's estate. The King referred the petition back to the Australian federal government.

== Personal life ==
Ronald died on 27 July 1941 at his home on St Kilda Road in Melbourne, aged 79. He had four sons, one of whom was killed in World War I. He was interred at Oakleigh Cemetery.

Parliament of Australia
Preceded by New seat	Member for Southern Melbourne; 1901 – 1906	Succeeded by Seat abolished
