= Watson ministry =

3rd ministry of the government of Australia

- 3rd Ministry of Australia

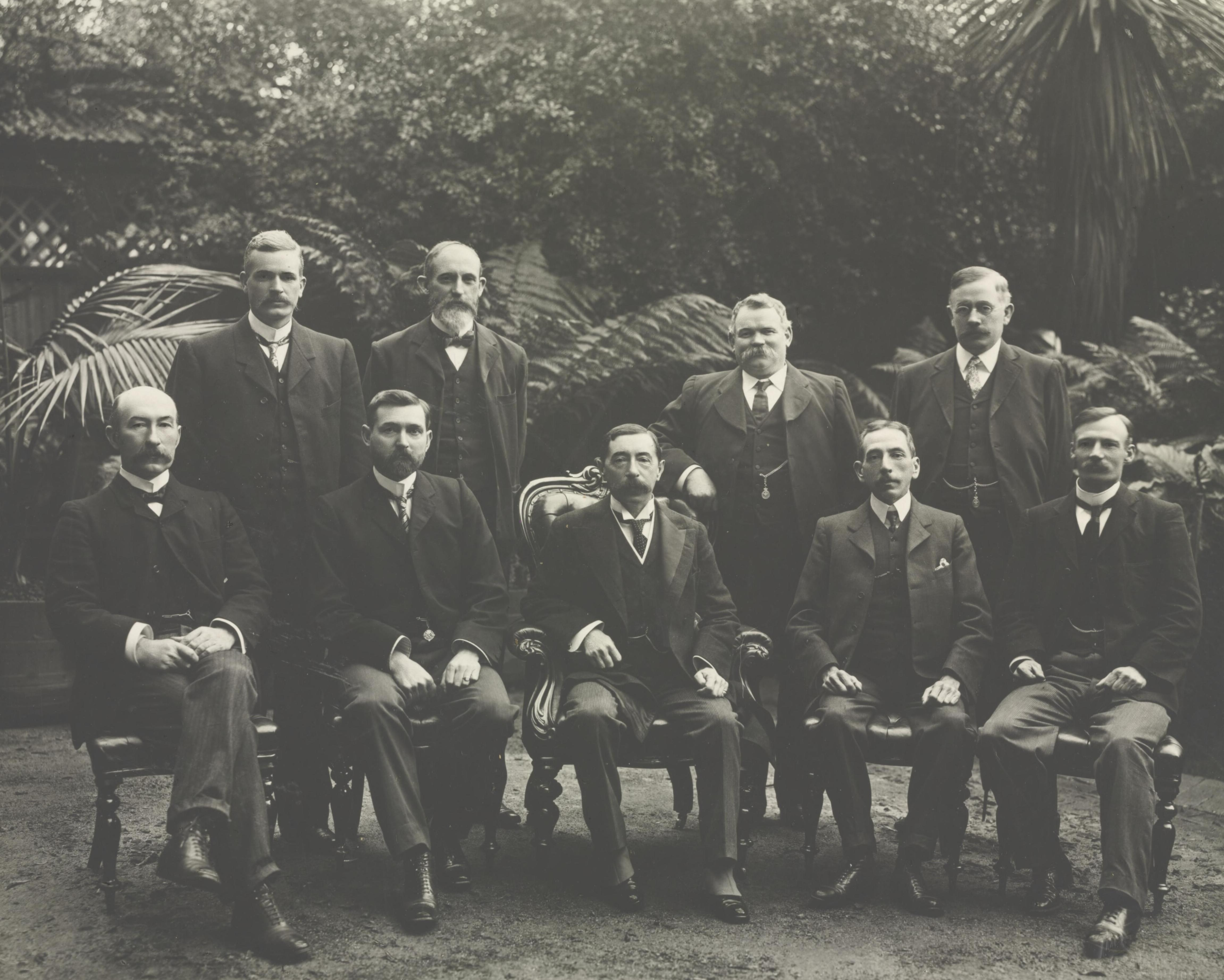
- Group photo of the Watson ministry with Governor-General Lord Northcote.
- Date formed: 27 April 1904
- Date dissolved: 17 August 1904

People and organisations
- Monarch: Edward VII
- Governor-General: Lord Northcote
- Prime Minister: Chris Watson
- No. of ministers: 8
- Member party: Labour
- Status in legislature: Minority government (Protectionist support)
- Opposition party: Free Trade
- Opposition leader: George Reid

History
- Legislature term: 2nd
- Predecessor: First Deakin ministry
- Successor: Reid ministry

The Watson ministry (Labour) was the 3rd ministry of the Government of Australia, and the first national Labour government formed in the world. It was led by the country's 3rd Prime Minister, Chris Watson. The Watson ministry succeeded the First Deakin ministry, which dissolved on 27 April 1904 after Labour withdrew their support and Alfred Deakin was forced to resign. The ministry was replaced by the Reid ministry on 17 August 1904 after the Protectionist Party withdrew their support over the Conciliation and Arbitration Bill.

Billy Hughes, who died in 1952, was the last surviving member of the Watson ministry; Hughes was also the last surviving member of the First Fisher ministry, Third Fisher ministry, Second Hughes ministry and Third Hughes ministry.

== Ministry ==
Party	Minister	Portrait	Portfolio
Labor	Chris Watson (1867–1941) MP for Bland (1901–1906)		Prime Minister; Leader of the Labor Party; Treasurer
Labor	Billy Hughes (1862–1952) MP for West Sydney (1901–1917)		Minister for External Affairs
Protectionist	H. B. Higgins (1851–1929) MP for Northern Melbourne (1901–1906) (Note: The Protectionist Party member Higgins accepted office (with Alfred Deakin's permission) as Attorney-General since the Labour Party did not have a lawyer in its parliamentary ranks with the exception of Billy Hughes, who had recently admitted as a barrister but who was already serving in another portfolio and was not viewed as qualified for the post. It was the only time a non-member of the Labour Party has served in a Labour ministry.)		Attorney-General
Labor	Lee Batchelor (1865–1911) MP for Boothby (1903–1911)		Minister for Home Affairs
Labor	Andrew Fisher (1862–1928) MP for Wide Bay (1901–1915)		Minister for Trade and Customs
Labor	Anderson Dawson (1863–1910) Senator for Queensland (1901–1906)		Minister for Defence
Labor	Hugh Mahon (1857–1931) MP for Coolgardie (1901–1913)		Postmaster-General
Labor	Gregor McGregor (1848–1914) Senator for South Australia (1901–1914)		Deputy Leader of the Labor Party; Vice-President of the Executive Council; Leader of the Government in the Senate
