= Reid ministry =

4th Australian government ministry

- 4th Ministry of Australia

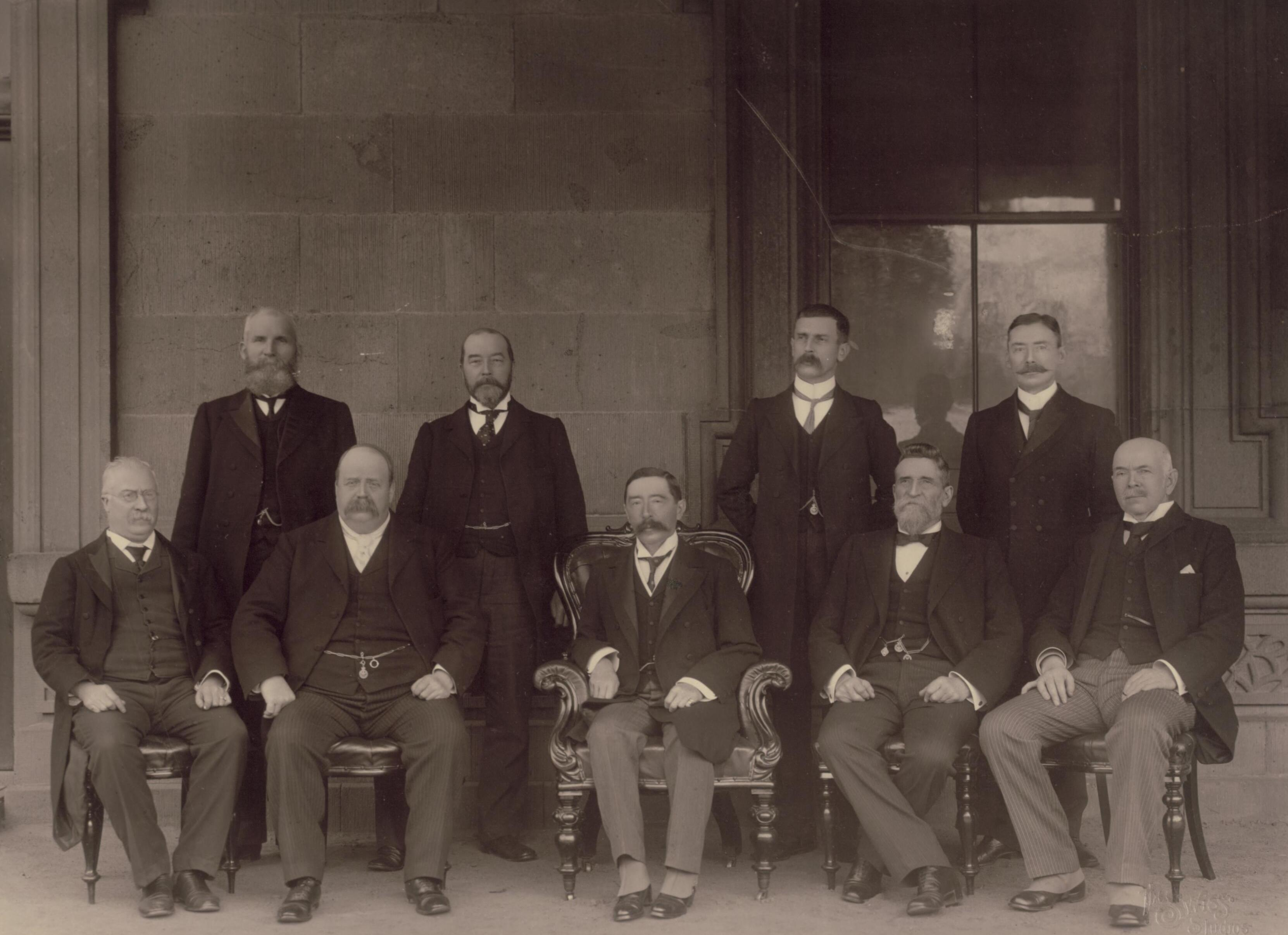
- Group photo of the Reid ministry with Governor-General Lord Northcote.
- Date formed: 17 August 1904
- Date dissolved: 5 July 1905

People and organisations
- Monarch: Edward VII
- Governor-General: Lord Northcote
- Prime Minister: George Reid
- No. of ministers: 8
- Member party: Free Trade
- Status in legislature: Minority government (Protectionist support)
- Opposition party: Labour
- Opposition leader: Chris Watson

History
- Legislature term: 2nd
- Predecessor: Watson ministry
- Successor: Second Deakin ministry

The Reid ministry (Free Trade) was the 4th ministry of the Government of Australia. It was led by the country's 4th Prime Minister, George Reid. The Reid ministry succeeded the Watson ministry, which dissolved on 17 August 1904 after the Protectionist Party withdrew their support and Chris Watson was forced to resign. Due to having to rely on the Protectionists to retain office, half of the ministry was forced to accommodate conservative Protectionists - leading to the government to sometimes be referred to as the Reid-McLean Ministry. The ministry was replaced by the Second Deakin ministry on 5 July 1905 after the Protectionists withdrew their support and returned to office with the support of the Labour Party.

James Drake, who died in 1941, was the last surviving member of the Reid ministry; Drake was also the last surviving minister of the Barton government and the First Deakin ministry. Sir Josiah Symon was the last surviving Free Trade minister.

== Ministry ==
| Party | Minister | Portrait | Portfolio |
|---|---|---|---|
| Free Trade | George Reid (1845–1918) MP for East Sydney (1901–1909) | | Prime Minister; Minister for External Affairs; Leader of the Free Trade Party |
| Protectionist | Allan McLean (1840–1911) MP for Gippsland (1901–1906) (Note: McLean, Turner, McCay and Drake were conservative Protectionist Party members. Their acceptance of office in Reid's ministry, although it had Alfred Deakin's tacit approval, it effectively ended their connection with the Deakinite organisation.) | | Minister for Trade and Customs |
| Free Trade | Sir Josiah Symon (1846–1934) Senator for South Australia (1901–1913) | | Attorney-General; Leader of the Government in the Senate |
| Protectionist | Sir George Turner (1851–1916) MP for Balaclava (1901–1906) | | Treasurer |
| Free Trade | Dugald Thomson (1849–1922) MP for North Sydney (1901–1910) | | Minister for Home Affairs; Deputy Leader of the Free Trade Party |
| Protectionist | James McCay (1864–1930) MP for Corinella (1901–1906) | | Minister for Defence |
| Free Trade | Sydney Smith (1856–1934) MP for Macquarie (1901–1906) | | Postmaster-General |
| Protectionist | James Drake (1850–1941) Senator for Queensland (1901–1906) | | Vice-President of the Executive Council |
