= First Fisher ministry =

6th ministry of the government of Australia

- 6th Ministry of Australia

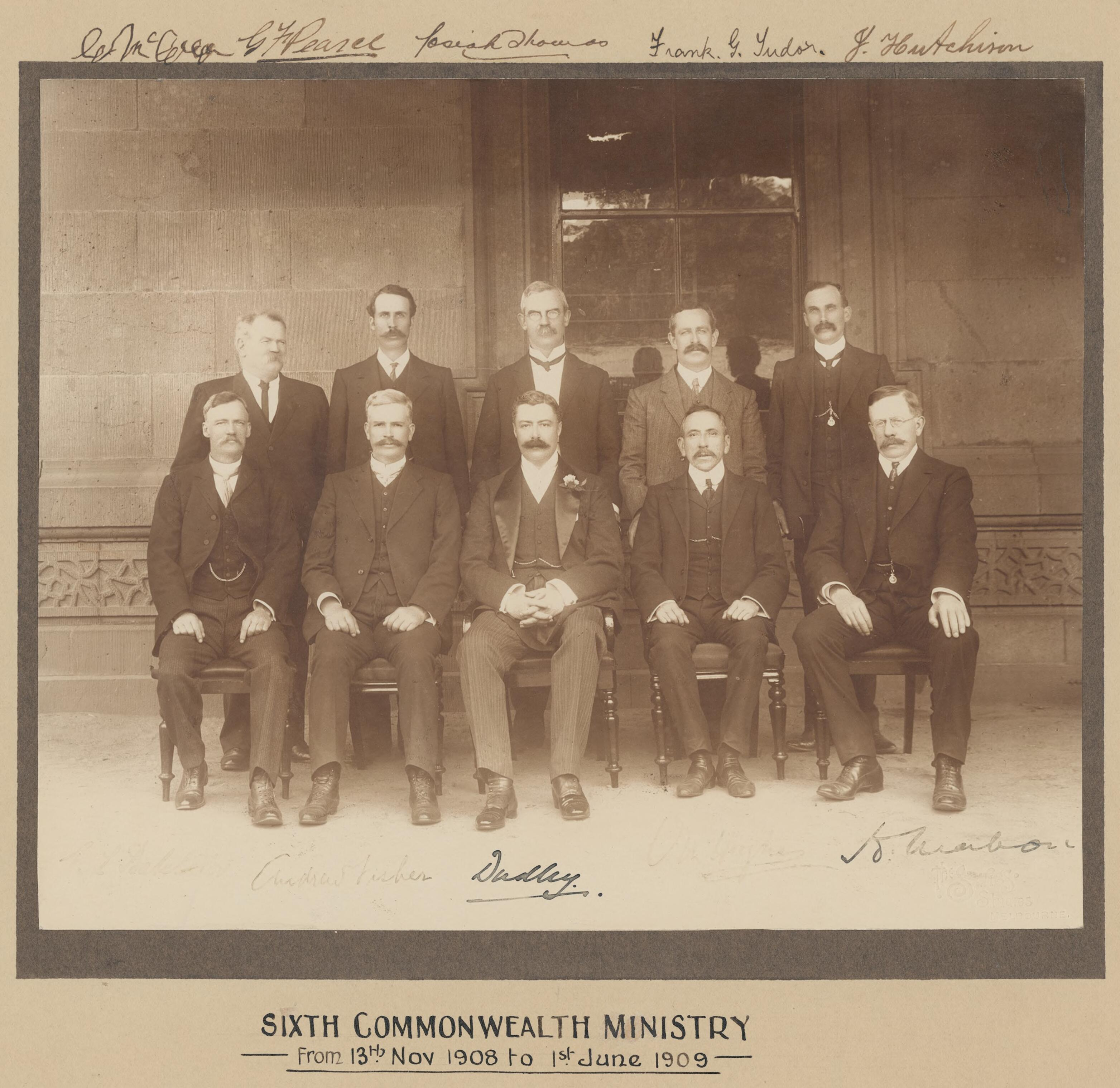
- Group photo of the First Fisher ministry with Governor-General Lord Dudley
- Date formed: 13 November 1908
- Date dissolved: 2 June 1909

People and organisations
- Monarch: Edward VII
- Governor-General: Lord Dudley
- Prime Minister: Andrew Fisher
- No. of ministers: 9
- Member party: Labour
- Status in legislature: Minority government (Protectionist support)
- Opposition party: Anti-Socialist; Liberal
- Opposition leader: George Reid; Joseph Cook; Alfred Deakin

History
- Legislature term: 3rd
- Predecessor: Second Deakin ministry
- Successor: Third Deakin ministry

The First Fisher ministry (Labour) was the 6th ministry of the Government of Australia. It was led by the country's 5th Prime Minister, Andrew Fisher. The First Fisher ministry succeeded the Second Deakin ministry, which dissolved on 13 November 1908 after Labour withdrew their support and Alfred Deakin was forced to resign. The ministry was replaced by the Third Deakin ministry on 2 June 1909 after the Protectionist Party and the Anti-Socialist Party merged into the Liberal Party "fusion" and withdrew their support in order to form what became the first majority government in federal Australian history.

Billy Hughes, who died in 1952, was the last surviving member of the First Fisher ministry; Hughes was also the last surviving member of the Watson ministry, Third Fisher ministry, Second Hughes ministry and Third Hughes ministry.

== Ministry ==
Party	Minister	Portrait	Portfolio
Labor	Andrew Fisher (1862–1928) MP for Wide Bay (1901–1915)		Prime Minister; Treasurer; Leader of the Labour Party
Labor	Billy Hughes (1862–1952) MP for West Sydney (1901–1917)		Attorney-General
Labor	Lee Batchelor (1865–1911) MP for Boothby (1903–1911)		Minister for External Affairs
Labor	Hugh Mahon (1857–1931) MP for Coolgardie (1901–1913)		Minister for Home Affairs
Labor	Josiah Thomas (1863–1933) MP for Barrier (1901–1917)		Postmaster-General
Labor	George Pearce (1870–1952) Senator for Western Australia (1901–1938)		Minister for Defence
Labor	Frank Tudor (1866–1922) MP for Yarra (1901–1922)		Minister for Trade and Customs
Labor	Gregor McGregor (1848–1914) Senator for South Australia (1901–1914)		Deputy Leader of the Labour Party; Vice-President of the Executive Council; Leader of the Government in the Senate
Labor	James Hutchison (1859–1909) MP for Hindmarsh (1903–1909)		Minister without Portfolio
