= Second Deakin ministry =

5th ministry of the government of Australia

- 5th Ministry of Australia

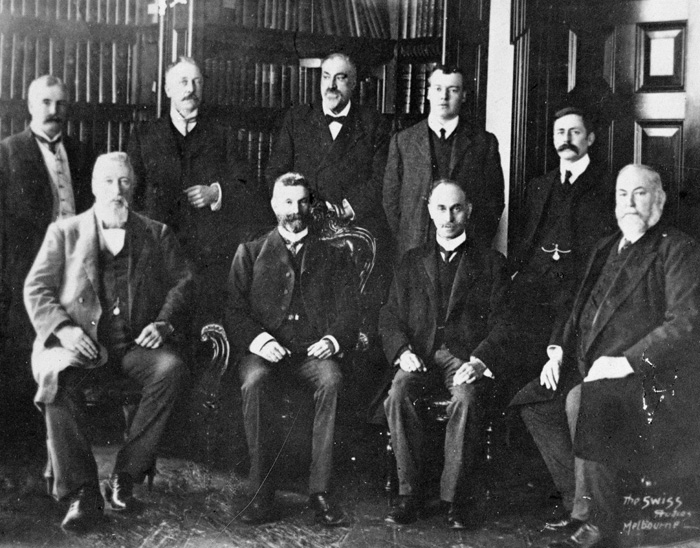
- Group photo of the second Deakin ministry with Governor-General Lord Northcote.
- Date formed: 5 July 1905
- Date dissolved: 13 November 1908

People and organisations
- Monarch: Edward VII
- Governor-General: Lord Northcote; Lord Dudley
- Prime Minister: Alfred Deakin
- No. of ministers: 12
- Member party: Protectionist
- Status in legislature: Minority government (Labour support)
- Opposition party: Free Trade/Anti-Socialist
- Opposition leader: George Reid

History
- Election: 12 December 1906
- Legislature terms: 2nd 3rd
- Predecessor: Reid ministry
- Successor: First Fisher ministry

The Second Deakin ministry (Protectionist) was the 5th ministry of the Government of Australia. It was led by the country's 2nd Prime Minister, Alfred Deakin. The second Deakin ministry succeeded the Reid ministry, which dissolved on 5 July 1905 following the resignation of George Reid after the Protectionists withdrew their support and gained support from the Labour Party. The ministry was replaced by the First Fisher ministry on 13 November 1908 after the Labour Party withdrew their support and formed their own minority government.

Isaac Isaacs, who died in 1948, was the last surviving member of the second Deakin ministry.

== Ministry ==
Party	Minister	Portrait	Portfolio
Protectionist	Alfred Deakin (1856–1919) MP for Ballaarat (1901–1913)		Prime Minister; Minister for External Affairs; Leader of the Protectionist Party
Protectionist	Sir John Forrest (1847–1918) MP for Swan (1901–1918)		Treasurer (to 29 July 1907)
Protectionist	Isaac Isaacs (1855–1948) MP for Indi (1901–1906)		Attorney-General (to 12 October 1906)
Protectionist	Littleton Groom (1867–1936) MP for Darling Downs (1901–1929)		Minister for Home Affairs (to 12 October 1906); Attorney-General (from 12 October 1906)
Protectionist	Sir William Lyne (1844–1913) MP for Hume (1901–1913)		Deputy Leader of the Protectionist Party; Minister for Trade and Customs (to 30 July 1907); Treasurer (from 30 July 1907)
Protectionist	Thomas Playford (1837–1915) Senator for South Australia (1901–1906)		Minister for Defence (to 31 December 1906); Leader of the Government in the Senate (to 31 December 1906)
Protectionist	Austin Chapman (1864–1926) MP for Eden-Monaro (1901–1926)		Postmaster-General (to 30 July 1907); Minister for Trade and Customs (from 30 July 1907)
Protectionist	Sir Thomas Ewing (1856–1920) MP for Richmond (1901–1910)		Vice-President of the Executive Council (to 12 October 1906); Minister for Home Affairs (from 12 October 1906 to 24 January 1907); Minister for Defence (from 24 January 1907)
Protectionist	John Keating (1872–1940) Senator for Tasmania (1901–1923)		Minister without Portfolio (to 12 October 1906); Vice-President of the Executive Council (from 12 October 1906 to 30 July 1907); Minister for Home Affairs (from 24 January 1907)
Protectionist	Samuel Mauger (1857–1936) MP for Melbourne Ports (1901–1906) MP for Maribyrnong (1906–1910) (in Ministry from 12 October 1906)		Minister without Portfolio (from 12 October 1906 to 30 July 1907); Postmaster-General (from 30 July 1907)
Protectionist	Sir Robert Best (1856–1946) Senator for Victoria (1901–1910) (in Ministry from 20 February 1907)		Vice-President of the Executive Council (from 20 February 1907); Leader of the Government in the Senate (from 20 February 1907)
Protectionist	James Hume Cook (1866–1942) MP for Bourke (1901–1910) (in Ministry from 28 January 1908)		Chief Government Whip in the House; Minister without Portfolio (from 28 January 1908)
