= Third Deakin ministry =

7th ministry of the government of Australia

- 7th Ministry of Australia

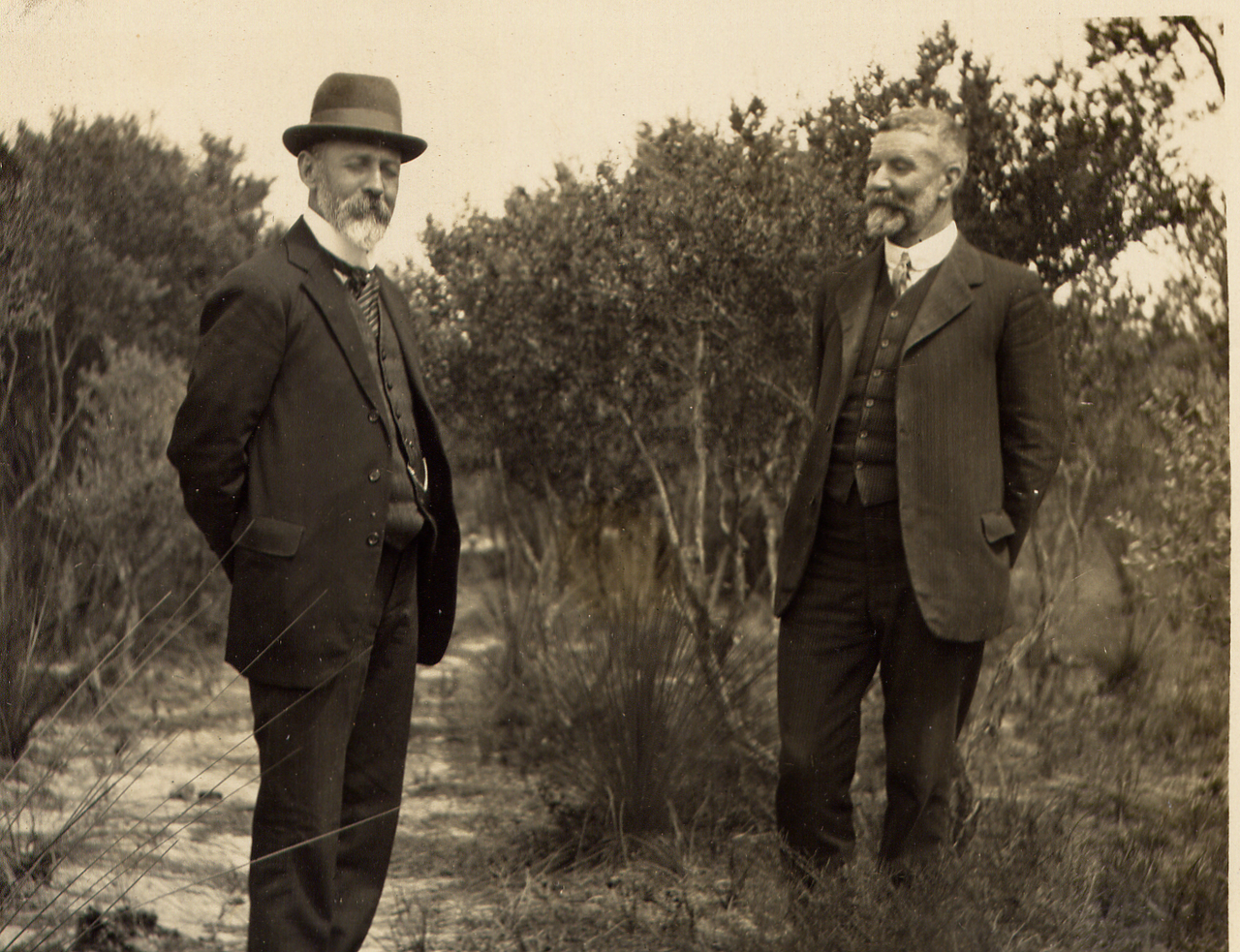
- Joseph Cook and Alfred Deakin in 1909.
- Date formed: 2 June 1909
- Date dissolved: 29 April 1910

People and organisations
- Monarch: Edward VII
- Governor-General: Lord Dudley
- Prime Minister: Alfred Deakin
- No. of ministers: 10
- Member party: Commonwealth Liberal
- Status in legislature: Majority government
- Opposition party: Labour
- Opposition leader: Andrew Fisher

History
- Outgoing election: 13 April 1910
- Legislature term: 3rd
- Predecessor: First Fisher ministry
- Successor: Second Fisher ministry

The Third Deakin ministry (Liberal) was the 7th ministry of the Government of Australia. It was led by the country's 2nd Prime Minister, Alfred Deakin. The Fourth Deakin ministry succeeded the First Fisher ministry, which dissolved on 2 June 1909 after the Protectionist Party and the Anti-Socialist Party merged into the Liberal Party "fusion" and withdrew their support in order to form what became the first majority government in federal Australian history. The ministry was replaced by the Second Fisher ministry on 29 April 1910 following the federal election that took place on 13 April which saw the Labour Party defeat the Liberals.

Joseph Cook, who died in 1947, was the last surviving member of the Third Deakin ministry.

This ministry, which was the last to be led by Deakin, was a mostly conservative one, with more than half of its members having previously been either conservative Protectionists or members of the Anti-Socialist Party. These included George Fuller, Joseph Cook, John Forrest, Justin Foxton, Edward Millen, and Paddy Glynn.

== Ministry ==
Party	Minister	Portrait	Portfolio
Liberal	Alfred Deakin (1856–1919) MP for Ballaarat (1901–1913)		Prime Minister (without portfolio); Leader of the Liberal Party
Liberal	Paddy Glynn (1855–1931) MP for Angas (1903–1919)		Attorney-General
Liberal	George Fuller (1861–1940) MP for Illawarra (1901–1913)		Minister for Home Affairs
Liberal	Littleton Groom (1867–1936) MP for Darling Downs (1901–1929)		Minister for External Affairs
Liberal	Sir Robert Best (1856–1946) Senator for Victoria (1901–1910)		Minister for Trade and Customs
Liberal	Sir John Forrest (1847–1918) MP for Swan (1901–1918)		Treasurer
Liberal	Joseph Cook (1860–1947) MP for Parramatta (1901–1921)		Deputy Leader of the Liberal Party; Minister for Defence
Liberal	Sir John Quick (1852–1932) MP for Bendigo (1901–1913)		Postmaster-General
Liberal	Edward Millen (1860–1923) Senator for New South Wales (1901–1923)		Vice-President of the Executive Council; Leader of the Government in the Senate
Liberal	Justin Foxton (1849–1916) MP for Brisbane (1906–1910)		Minister without Portfolio
