= James Hume Cook =

Australian politician (1866–1942)

The Honourable James Hume Cook CMG
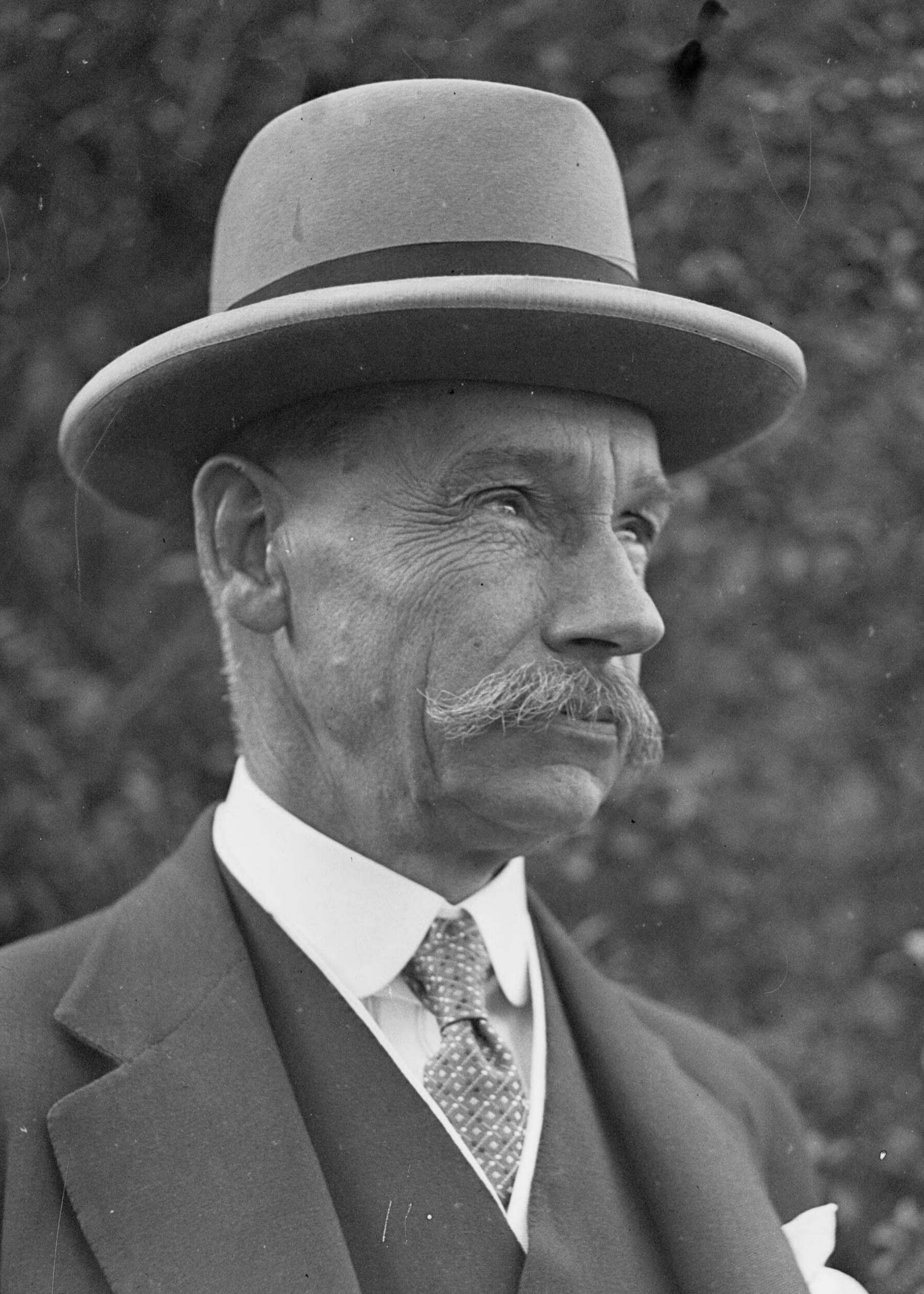

Member of the Australian Parliament for Bourke
- In office 29 March 1901 – 13 April 1910
- Preceded by: New seat
- Succeeded by: Frank Anstey

Personal details
- Born: 24 November 1866 Kihikihi, New Zealand
- Died: 8 August 1942 (aged 75) Brighton, Victoria
- Party: Protectionist (1901–09); Liberal (1909–10)
- Spouse: Nellie Maine
- Occupation: Estate agent

James Newton Haxton Hume Cook CMG (23 September 1866 – 8 August 1942) was an Australian politician. He was a member of the House of Representatives from 1901 to 1910, after previously serving in the Victorian Legislative Assembly from 1894 to 1900. He was a member of the anti-socialist parties and served as a minister without portfolio under Alfred Deakin.

== Early life ==
Hume Cook was born in Kihikihi, New Zealand. He was the eldest of the nine children of James Cook, a private in the Waikato Militia and later a failed farmer, originally from Walsall, England, and his wife Janet Mair, from Rutherglen, Scotland. Hume Cook’s schooling was limited by his family’s poverty; in his teens in Melbourne he worked with his father, a semi-skilled tradesman, then set out on his own selling real estate in 1887. He also soon became active in the Australian Natives' Association. In 1893, he was elected to Brunswick Town Council and in 1896 became mayor. In 1902, he married Nellie Maine.

== Australian Natives' Association ==
James Hume Cook joined the Brunswick branch of the ANA in the late 1880s and rose rapidly through the ranks; at his first meeting he was appointed branch auditor, within fifteen months he was branch president. In 1894 he joined the board of directors and in 1896 was elected Chief President. As the ANA was for native born Australians, his birth place may have been unknown to the Brunswich Branch.

In his reminiscences Hume Cook declared that he owed ‘almost everything’ to the ANA, and certainly the association gave him an education in both practical and ideological politics. Through its lectures and debates he learnt the radical version of liberalism: adult suffrage and one man one vote; an eight-hour day and a minimum wage; a tax on unimproved land values, an absentee tax, and a graduated income tax; local option; and the exclusion of Chinese and Asiatic labour. He became an accomplished if somewhat verbose lecturer, much in demand in both city and country branches; thus in ‘a crowded meeting’ in Castlemaine he ‘for an hour and a half riveted the attention of the audience’ He also gained fame as a singer of sentimental songs. His most important work for the ANA, as Chief President in 1896 and afterwards, was an advocate for Federation.

== Parliamentary career ==
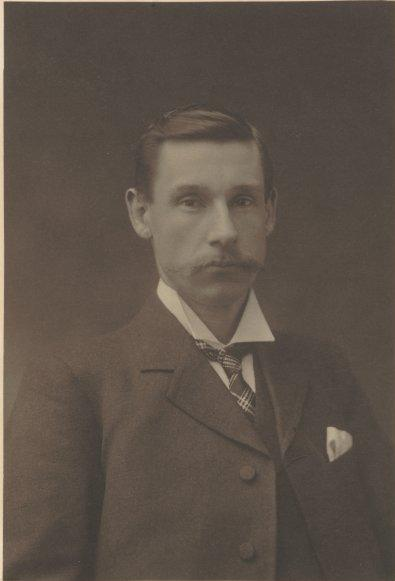
Hume Cook c. 1902

In 1893 Hume Cook won a seat on the Brunswick Town Council at his fourth attempt, becoming mayor in 1896. He was elected to the seat of East Bourke Boroughs in the Victorian Legislative Assembly in 1894, winning East Bourke Boroughs with strong support from Trades Hall voters. In parliament he worked alongside Labor members without ever joining the party, supporting electoral, educational and land reform, and state intervention into wage-fixing and working conditions. He supported to federation of Australia 1897, but came only 19th in the vote for the Victorian delegates to the 1897 Australasian Federal Convention. He supported liberal causes, such as protection and state intervention into wage-fixing and working conditions, but lost his seat in 1900.

Hume Cook won the Australian House of Representatives seat of Bourke at the first federal election in 1901 as a Protectionist and a supporter of Alfred Deakin,. He joined the fusion in 1909 in an attempt to hold on to his seat, although its creation ran against his political principles. ‘Between 1905 and 1908 he was party whip, cabinet secretary and honorary minister ... experiences he thought much less interesting than his rescue by the police from an armed lunatic who had invaded his parliamentary office’. From January 1908 to the defeat of the government in 1908, he was a minister without portfolios in the Deakin ministry. He chaired a Royal Commission on postal services from June to December 1908. The Labor Party campaigned actively against him at the 1910 election and he was defeated by Frank Anstey. He ran unsuccessfully for Maribyrnong at the 1913 election.

== Later life ==
Hume Cook was involved with Billy Hughes in the establishment of the Nationalist Party in 1916 and the Australian Party in 1929 and 1930. He was also secretary of the Australian Industries Protection League from 1922 until his death and represented Australian industry at the British Empire Economic Conference in Ottawa in 1932. He was also involved in orchard-growing, mining and insurance companies and charitable organisations. He published a book of Australian fairytales and wrote hundreds of political pamphlets, patriotic poetry, and several versions of reminiscences.In 1941, he was made a Companion of the Order of St Michael and St George (CMG). He died in the Melbourne suburb of Brighton, Victoria in 1942, survived by his wife, a daughter and two sons.

== Books ==
James Hume Cook published the following books:

- Australian Fairy Tales, (1925)
- A Win to Wireless (1941)
- Australian Natives' Association: Its genesis and history (1931)
- Victoria: A pageant of the years 1834-1934 (1934)
- "The new tariff." (1936)
- The Australian Industries Protection League: A historical review (1938)

The following books were intended as gifts and clearly said they were not for sale:

- Tales of the Dandenongs. by James Hume-Cook. - First series / 53 pages 1935. (Badger's Creek; Belgrave; Sassafras; Monbulk; Wandin; Belgrave.)
- Tales of the Dandenongs. by James Hume-Cook. - Second series / 31 pages 1938 (Gembrook; Olinda.)
- Tales of the Dandenongs. by James Hume-Cook. - Third series / 52 pages 1939 (The Singer; Two Letters; Kalorama)
- Tales of the Dandenongs. by James Hume-Cook. - Fourth series / 48 pages 1940 (Ferny Creek; Warburton; Upper Beaconsfield.)

Parliament of Australia
| New division | Member for Bourke; 1901–1910 | Succeeded by Frank Anstey |
