= John Gratton Wilson =

Australian politician

Dr John Gratton Wilson
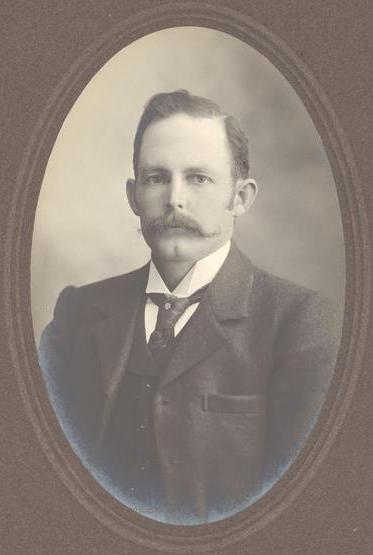

Member of the Australian Parliament for Corangamite
- In office 16 December 1903 – 13 April 1910
- Preceded by: Chester Manifold
- Succeeded by: James Scullin

Personal details
- Born: 18 August 1863 Melbourne, Victoria
- Died: 20 August 1948 (aged 85) Colac, Victoria, Australia
- Party: Free Trade (1903–06); Anti-Socialist (1906–09); Liberal (1909–10)
- Spouse: Alexandra Frances Symons (m. 1890–1931)
- Occupation: Doctor

John Gratton Wilson (18 August 1863 – 20 August 1948) was an Australian politician. He was a member of the Victorian Legislative Assembly for Villiers and Heytesbury from 1902 to 1903 and a Free Trade Party member of the Australian House of Representatives for Corangamite from 1903 to 1910.

Gratton Wilson was born in Melbourne and educated at the Percy Watkins School in West Melbourne and Wesley College. He studied medicine at the University of London and practised in Somerset, England, until 1896, when he returned to Australia, becoming a doctor and farmer at "Farnham Park" near Warrnambool. He was the Warrnambool president of the Australian Natives Association, honorary secretary of the Warrnambool Hospital and secretary of a local Patriotic League.

In 1902, he was elected to the Victorian Legislative Assembly for the seat of Villiers and Heytesbury on a platform of "assisting in every practicable way the interests of the dairyman, the agriculturalist and the pastoralist" alongside support for the economic reforms of the Irvine government. However, he resigned his state seat, which was about to be abolished in a redistribution, in November 1903 and successfully transferred to federal politics, winning the Australian House of Representatives seat of Corangamite as a member of the Free Trade Party.

In federal parliament, Gratton Wilson described himself as a protectionist but opposed the Protectionist Party due to his hostility towards their more positive relationship with the Labor Party. He thus opposed Alfred Deakin, but voted against free trade policies. In March 1904, his maiden speech opposed proposals to increase House sitting days as it would be "too great a tax on businessmen's time." He was re-elected in 1906 but was defeated in 1910 by future Labor Prime Minister James Scullin. He attributed his defeat to "apathy and treachery" by anti-Labor supporters who thought he would win. He did not assist him despite a strong Labor campaign and "misrepresentations and misunderstandings."

He served in World War I from 1916 to 1919 as a member of the Army Medical Corps, after which he returned to his Warrnambool medical practice and farm. He retired in 1920 and moved to "Iluka" at Moonlight Head (later Yuulong) near Cape Otway. His Yuulong home was destroyed in bushfires in 1934, though he still resided in the area in 1939 when he donated 375 ferns to the Wombat Hill Botanic Gardens. He died at Colac, Victoria, in 1948, aged 85.

Victorian Legislative Assembly
Preceded by Peter McArthur	Member for Villiers and Heytesbury; 1902–1903	Succeeded by John Glasgow
Parliament of Australia
Preceded by Chester Manifold	Member for Corangamite; 1903–1910	Succeeded by James Scullin
