= Electoral results for the Division of Tasmania =

Australian division election results

The Division of Tasmania in Australia was created in 1901 and abolished in 1903.

== Members ==
Member	Party	Term
Sir Edward Braddon	Free Trade	1901–1903
Norman Cameron	Free Trade	1901–1903
Sir Philip Fysh	Protectionist	1901–1903
King O'Malley	Independent Labour	1901–1903
King O'Malley	Labour	1901–1903
Frederick Piesse	Free Trade	1901–1902
William Hartnoll	Free Trade	1902–1903

== Election results ==
For multi-member elections, elected candidates are listed in bold. Each Tasmanian elector at the 1901 election cast one vote.

=== Elections in the 1900s ===
1902 Tasmania by-election
Party	Candidate	Votes	%	±%
Free Trade	William Hartnoll	6,956	57.90	N/A
Labour	James Whitelaw	2,525	21.02	N/A
Protectionist	John McCall	2,051	17.07	N/A
Independent	Charles Hall	482	4.01	N/A
Total formal votes		12,014	99.17	+2.04
Informal votes		101	0.83	−2.04
Turnout		12,115	30.47	−16.52
Free Trade **hold**		**Swing**	N/A	

==== 1901 ====
1901 Australian federal election: Tasmania
Party	Candidate	Votes	%	±%
Free Trade	**Sir Edward Braddon**	4,720	26.2	+26.2
Independent Labour	**King O'Malley**	3,940	21.9	+21.9
Free Trade	**Norman Cameron**	2,092	11.6	+11.6
Free Trade	**Frederick Piesse**	1,816	9.9	+9.9
Protectionist	**Sir Philip Fysh**	1,794	9.9	+9.9
Free Trade	William Hartnoll	1,430	7.9	+7.9
Protectionist	James Whitelaw	1,167	6.5	+6.5
Protectionist	Charles Fenton	942	5.2	+5.2
Independent	David Blanshard	140	0.8	+0.8
Total formal votes		18,041	97.1	
Informal votes		533	2.9	
Turnout		18,575	47.0	
