= 1902 Tasmania by-election =

- 26 March 1902

The Tasmania seat in the House of Representatives
- Registered: 39,762
- Turnout: 12,115 (30.47%)
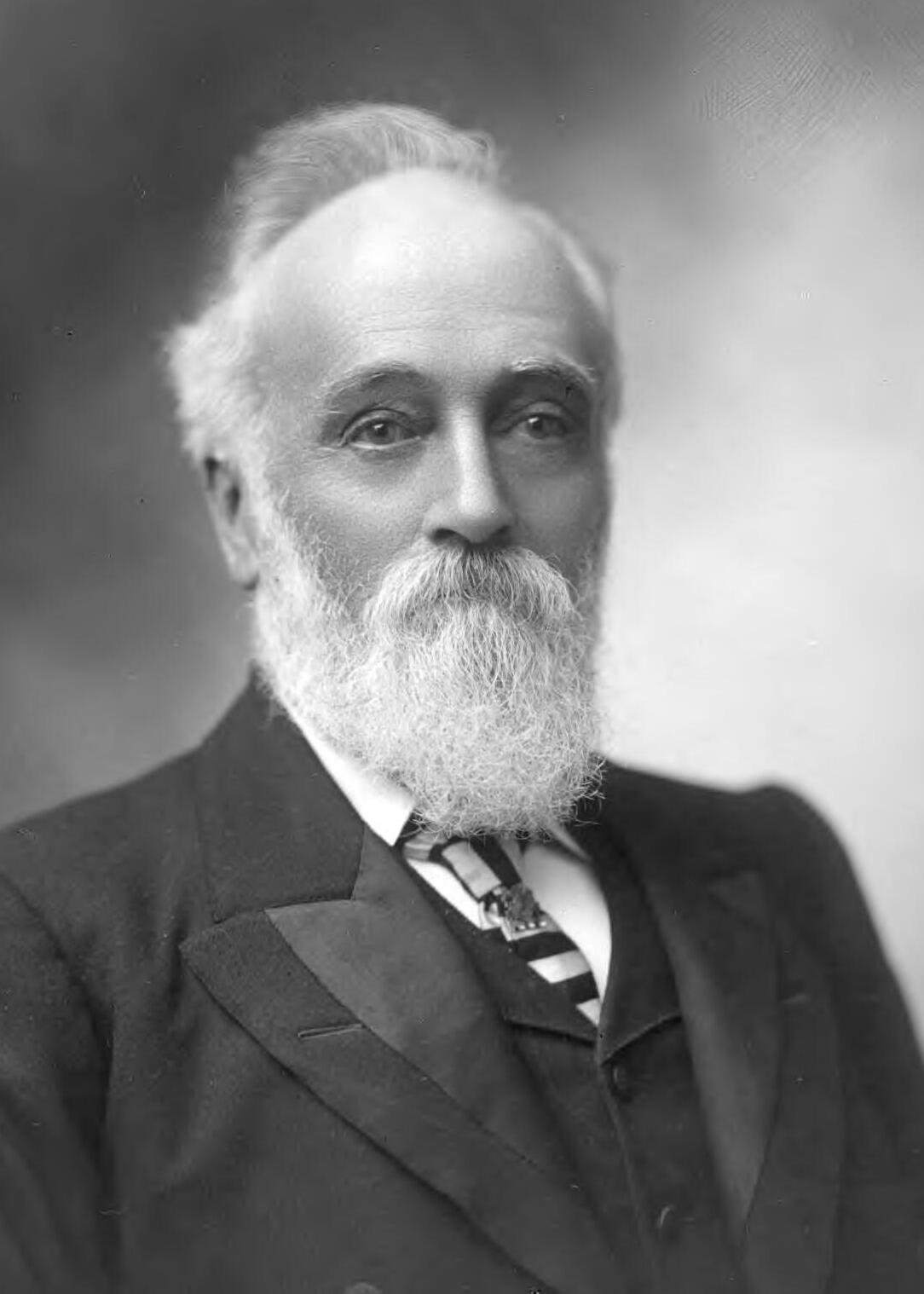
	First party	Second party
		ALP
Candidate	William Hartnoll	James Whitelaw
Party	Free Trade	Labour
Popular vote	6,956	2,525
Percentage	57.90%	21.02%
	Third party	Fourth party
	PROT	IND
Candidate	John McCall	Charles Hall
Party	Protectionist	Independent
Popular vote	2,051	482
Percentage	17.07%	4.01%
MP before election
Frederick William Piesse
Free Trade
Elected MP
William Hartnoll
Free Trade

A by-election was held for one of the seats of the Australian House of Representatives electorate of Tasmania on 26 March 1902. This was triggered by the death of Frederick William Piesse on 6 March 1902. The writ for the by-election was issued on 11 March, nominations for candidates closed on 20 March.

== Results ==
Tasmania by-election, 1902
Party	Candidate	Votes	%	±%
Free Trade	William Hartnoll	6,956	57.90	N/A
Labour	James Whitelaw	2,525	21.02	N/A
Protectionist	John McCall	2,051	17.07	N/A
Independent	Charles Hall	482	4.01	N/A
Total formal votes		12,014	99.17	+2.04
Informal votes		101	0.83	−2.04
Registered electors		39,762		
Turnout		12,115	30.47	−16.52
Free Trade hold				

== Aftermath ==
William Hartnoll was elected in the by-election, receiving nearly 58 per cent of the vote. When opposition leader George Reid received a telegram from the Freetrade Association of Launceston informing him of Hartnoll's impending victory, he proclaimed "Thanks! Hartnoll's triumph overshadows the inevitable fate of the Barton ministry."

Hartnoll's election was not without controversy. Under Tasmanian law, nominations from candidates were required to be signed by the candidate himself. Hartnoll's nomination paper was received and accepted by the Commonwealth electoral officer via telegram, and was not signed. J.C. Whitelaw, one of Hartnoll's opponents in the by-election, challenged the election on legal grounds, and instructed his solicitors in Melbourne to lodge a petition and a deposit of £100 to the Supreme Court of Tasmania. The petition was referred by the Prime Minister Edmund Barton to the Elections and Qualifications Committee of the House of Representatives. After hearing the evidence, committee chair Sir Edward Braddon announced that the committee had found that Hartnoll had "committed an irregularity" by nominating via telegram, but that it was not considered a sufficient reason for disturbing the election.

== See also ==
- List of Australian federal by-elections
