= Electoral district of Brighton (Tasmania) =

Former electoral district of Tasmania

The electoral district of Brighton was a single-member electoral district of the Tasmanian House of Assembly. It extended from the town of Brighton to the north of Hobart.

The seat was created ahead of the Assembly's first election held in 1856, and was abolished at the 1903 election, when it was merged with neighbouring Richmond into the new district of Monmouth.

The election on 22 May 1891 resulted in the defeat of the incumbent member, Henry Mugliston, by Thomas Dillon. Mugliston petitioned the court alleging Dillon had engaged in corrupt practices and bribery during the campaign and on 25 July 1891, Dillon's election was declared void under the Electoral Act 1890. Neither candidate ran in the resulting by-election on 12 August 1891, and Henry Dobson, who was aligned with Mugliston, won against non-aligned candidate Thomas Hodgman. Barely a year later, following the fall of Philip Fysh's government, Dobson became Premier of Tasmania, a role in which he served for 20 months.

== Members for Brighton ==
Member	Term
Henry Butler	1856–1862
John Hayes	1862–1866
Henry Butler	1866–1885
Alfred Lord	1885–1886
Henry Mugliston	1886–1891
Thomas Dillon	1891–1891
Henry Dobson	1891–1900
Thomas Hodgman	1900–1903
