= 1904 Wilmot by-election =

Australian federal by-election

- 2 February 1904

The Wilmot seat in the House of Representatives
- Registered: 15,718
- Turnout: 4,704 (29.93%)
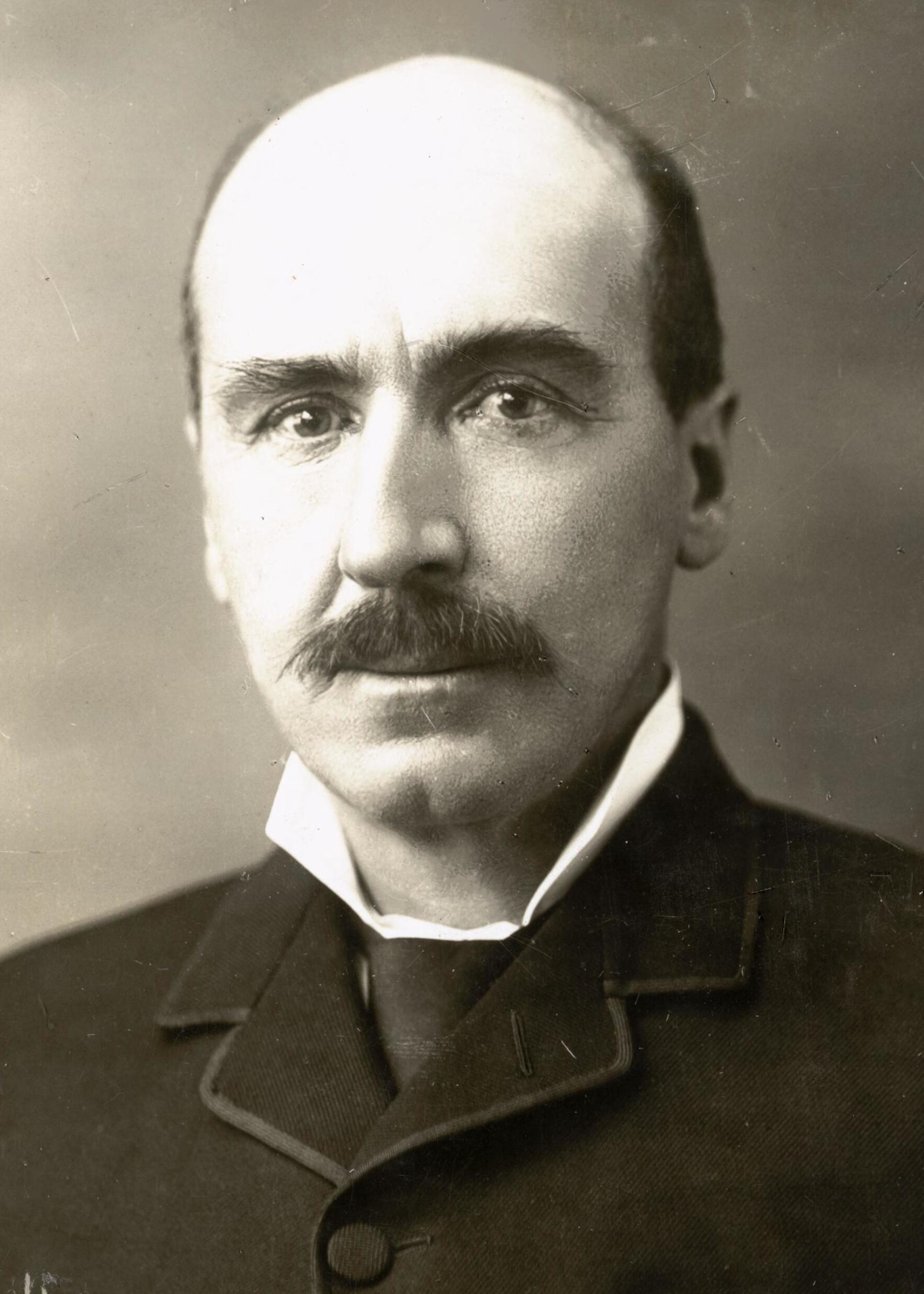
	First party	Second party
		PROT
Candidate	Norman Cameron	John Cheek
Party	Free Trade	Protectionist
Popular vote	2,368	2,183
Percentage	52.03%	47.97%
Swing	▼2.85	▲2.85
MP before election
Edward Braddon
Free Trade
Elected MP
Norman Cameron
Free Trade

A by-election was held for the Australian House of Representatives seat of Wilmot in Tasmania on 26 February 1904. This was triggered by the death of former Premier of Tasmania and federal Free Trade Party MP Sir Edward Braddon on 2 February 1904.

The by-election was won by Free Trade candidate Norman Cameron (a former member of the Tasmanian House of Assembly, and who had represented Tasmania in the Australian House of Representatives until he was voted out in the 1903 federal election), against John Cheek for the Protectionist Party. Voting was not compulsory in 1904.

== Results ==
1904 Wilmot by-election
Party	Candidate	Votes	%	±%
Free Trade	Norman Cameron	2,368	52.03	−2.85
Protectionist	John Cheek	2,183	47.97	+2.85
Total formal votes		4,551	96.75	−1.49
Informal votes		153	3.25	+1.49
Registered electors		15,718		
Turnout		4,704	29.93	−9.16
Free Trade hold		Swing	−2.85	

== See also ==
- List of Australian federal by-elections
