= Thomas Dillon (politician) =

Australian politician (??–1908)

Member of the Tasmanian House of Assembly for Brighton
- In office 22 May 1891 – 25 July 1891
- Preceded by: Henry Mugliston
- Succeeded by: Henry Dobson

Thomas Dillon (died 12 January 1908) was an Australian politician.

In May 1891, Dillon was elected to the Tasmanian House of Assembly, defeating Henry Mugliston to become the member for Brighton. Mugliston challenged the result, claiming Dillon had engaged in corruption and bribery. Dillon's election was declared void and his term came to an end in July 1891.

Dillon served as an alderman on Hobart Council. He died in Hobart on 12 January 1908 aged 61 and was buried at Cornelian Bay Cemetery.

Tasmanian House of Assembly
Preceded by Henry Mugliston	Member for Brighton; 1891	Succeeded by Henry Dobson
