= Frederick Piesse =

Frederick Piesse may refer to:

- Frederick Henry Piesse (1853–1912), Western Australian businessman and politician
- Frederick William Piesse (1848–1902), Tasmanian politician
