= Thomas Hodgman =

Australian politician

Thomas Christopher Hodgman (7 June 1853 – 12 December 1930) was an Australian politician.

He was born in Broadstairs in Kent. In 1900 he was elected to the Tasmanian House of Assembly as the member for Brighton, transferring to Monmouth in 1903. In 1909, with the introduction of proportional representation, he was elected as an Anti-Socialist member for Franklin. He retired in 1912. His nephew Bill Hodgman would later serve in both houses of the Tasmanian Parliament from 1955 to 1983. Hodgman died in Hobart in 1930.
