= Division of Tasmania =

Former Australian federal electoral division

Tasmania Australian House of Representatives Division
- Created: 1901
- Abolished: 1903
- Namesake: Tasmania

The Division of Tasmania was an Australian electoral division covering Tasmania. The five-member statewide seat existed from the inaugural 1901 election until the 1903 election. Each elector cast one vote. Unlike most of the other states, Tasmania had not been split into individual single-member electorates. The other exception was the seven-member Division of South Australia. The statewide seats were abolished at a redistribution conducted two months prior to the 1903 election and were subsequently replaced with single-member divisions, one per displaced member, with each elector now casting a single vote.

== Members ==
Sorted in order of votes received

Image	Member	Party	Term	Notes
	Sir Edward Braddon (1829–1904)	Free Trade	29 March 1901 – 16 December 1903	Previously held the Tasmanian House of Assembly seat of West Devon. Transferred to the Division of Wilmot when Tasmania was abolished in 1903
	King O'Malley (1854–1953)	Independent Labour	29 March 1901 – June 1901	Previously held the South Australian House of Assembly seat of Encounter Bay. Transferred to the Division of Darwin when Tasmania was abolished in 1903
	King O'Malley (1854–1953)	Labour	June 1901 – 16 December 1903	Previously held the South Australian House of Assembly seat of Encounter Bay. Transferred to the Division of Darwin when Tasmania was abolished in 1903
	Norman Cameron (1851–1931)	Free Trade	29 March 1901 – 16 December 1903	Failed to win the Division of Denison when Tasmania was abolished in 1903. Later elected to the Division of Wilmot in 1904
	Frederick Piesse (1858–1902)	Free Trade	29 March 1901 – 6 March 1902	Previously held the Tasmanian Legislative Council seat of Buckingham. Died in office
	Sir Philip Fysh (1835–1919)	Protectionist	29 March 1901 – 16 December 1903	Previously held the Tasmanian House of Assembly seat of Hobart. Served as minister under Barton and Deakin. Transferred to the Division of Denison when Tasmania was abolished in 1903
	William Hartnoll (1841–1932)	Free Trade	26 March 1902 – 16 December 1903	Previously held the Tasmanian House of Assembly seat of Launceston. Failed to win the Division of Bass when Tasmania was abolished in 1903

The Division was split into five single-member seats at the 1903 election – Bass (Storrer, Protectionist), Darwin (O'Malley, Labour), Denison (Fysh, Protectionist), Franklin (McWilliams, Tariff) and Wilmot (Braddon, Free Trade).
