= Alfred Lord =

Australian politician

Member of the Tasmanian House of Assembly for Brighton
- In office 16 September 1885 – July 1886
- Preceded by: Henry Butler
- Succeeded by: Henry Mugliston

Member of the Tasmanian Legislative Council for Cambridge
- In office 29 January 1890 – 4 May 1897
- Preceded by: John Lord
- Succeeded by: Charles Davies

Personal details
- Born: Alfred Edwin Lord; 15 October 1858 Hobart, Tasmania
- Died: 11 October 1905 (aged 46) Hobart, Tasmania

Alfred Edwin Lord (15 October 1858 – 11 October 1905) was an Australian politician.

Lord was born in Hobart in 1858. In 1886 he was elected to the Tasmanian House of Assembly, representing the seat of Brighton, but he was defeated the following year. In 1890 he succeeded his father as the member for Cambridge in the Tasmanian Legislative Council, serving until 1897. He died in 1905 in Hobart.

Tasmanian House of Assembly
Preceded by Henry Butler	Member for Brighton; 1885–1886	Succeeded by Henry Mugliston
Tasmanian Legislative Council
Preceded by John Lord	Member for Cambridge; 1890–1897	Succeeded by Charles Davies
