= Electoral district of Monmouth =

Former electoral district of Tasmania

The Electoral district of Monmouth was a single-member electoral district of the Tasmanian House of Assembly. It was based in the rural hinterland to the north of the state capital, Hobart.

The seat was created in a redistribution ahead of the 1903 state election out of the former seats of Brighton and Richmond, and was abolished when the Tasmanian parliament adopted the Hare-Clark electoral model in 1909. It had a single member during its existence, Thomas Hodgman.

== Members for Monmouth ==
Member	Term
Thomas Hodgman	1903–1909

== See also ==
- Monmouth Land District
