= Henry Mugliston =

Australian politician

Member of the Tasmanian House of Assembly for Brighton
- In office 26 July 1886 – May 1891
- Preceded by: Alfred Lord
- Succeeded by: Thomas Dillon

Personal details
- Born: Henry Boyes Mugliston; 1848 or 1849
- Died: 24 June 1914 (aged 65) London, England

Henry Boyes Mugliston (1848/1849 – 24 June 1914) was an Australian politician.

Mugliston was elected in 1886 to the Tasmanian House of Assembly, representing the seat of Brighton. He served until his defeat in 1891. He died in 1914 in London.

Tasmanian House of Assembly
Preceded by Charles Grubb	Member for Selby; 1885–1893	Succeeded by Frank Archer
