= Norman Cameron (politician) =

Australian politician

The Honourable Norman Cameron
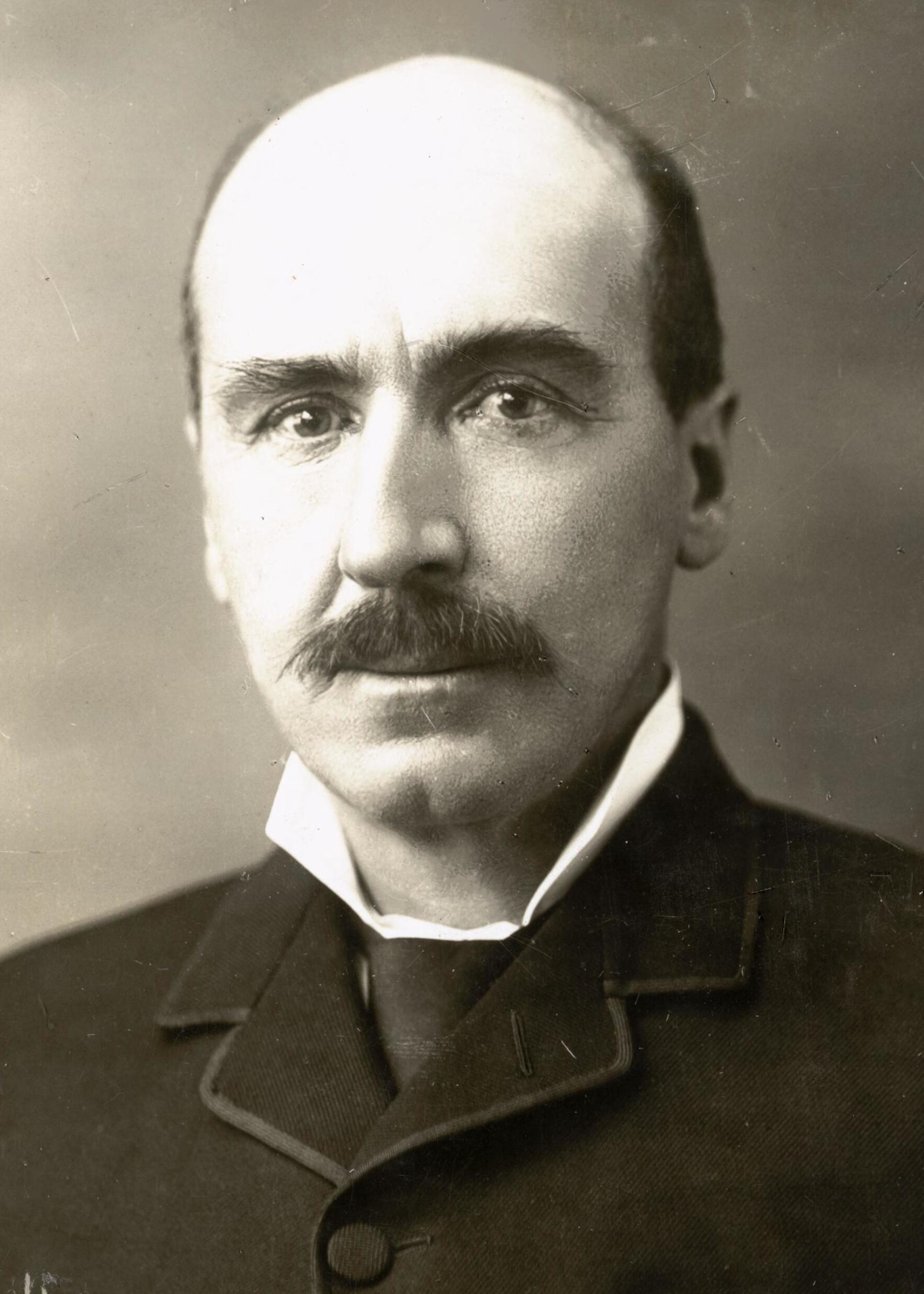

Member of the Australian Parliament for Wilmot
- In office 26 February 1904 – 12 December 1906
- Preceded by: Edward Braddon
- Succeeded by: Llewellyn Atkinson

Member of the Australian Parliament for Tasmania
- In office 29 March 1901 – 16 December 1903 Serving with Edward Braddon, Philip Fysh, King O'Malley, Frederick Piesse/William Hartnoll
- Preceded by: New seat
- Succeeded by: Division abolished

Personal details
- Born: 3 November 1851 Launceston, Van Diemen's Land
- Died: 17 February 1931 (aged 79) Chudleigh, Tasmania, Australia
- Party: Free Trade
- Relations: Donald Cameron (father); Cyril Cameron (brother)
- Children: Donald Keith Cameron
- Education: St Andrews University
- Occupation: Sheepbreeder

Donald Norman Cameron (3 November 1851 – 17 February 1931) was an Australian politician. He served in the House of Representatives (1901–1903, 1904–1906) and Tasmanian House of Assembly (1912–1913, 1925–1928).

== Early life ==
Cameron was born in Launceston, Tasmania, the son of Donald Cameron who served in the Tasmanian Legislative Council from 1868 to 1886.

== Federal politics ==
At the 1901 federal election, Cameron was elected for the Free Trade Party as one of Tasmania's five members of the Australian House of Representatives, since Tasmania had not been divided into electoral divisions. He was one of few to publicly oppose the Immigration Restriction Act 1901, a cornerstone of the White Australia policy, stating:

[N]o race on... this earth has been treated in a more shameful manner than have the Chinese.... They were forced at the point of a bayonet to admit Englishmen... into China. Now if we compel them to admit our people... why in the name of justice should we refuse to admit them here?

At the 1903 election he contested the seat of Denison, but was defeated by the Protectionist candidate, Sir Philip Fysh. He returned to the House when he won a by-election in the seat of Wilmot in 1904. He is remembered today for his part in the choice of national capital. The house was evenly divided, he effectively having the casting vote. After two weeks' prevarication he settled on Canberra.

Prior to the 1906 election, supporters of the Anti-Socialists in Cameron's electorate decided to switch their support to a new candidate, Llewellyn Atkinson, as they believed Atkinson was more popular in the electorate and did not wish to split the vote. However, some newspapers such as The Hobart Mercury still listed him as the endorsed Anti-Socialist candidate in Wilmot. He was defeated by Atkinson and out-polled by the Labor candidate, finishing with 12.1 percent of the vote.

== State politics and later life ==
After losing his federal seat Cameron returned to Tasmanian politics, serving in the House of Assembly from 1912 to 1913 and again from 1925 to 1928. He died at Chudleigh of pneumonia following a fall. He was survived by his wife, a daughter and two of his three sons. One son, Donald Keith Cameron, served in the Tasmanian House of Assembly from 1934 to 1937. His brother Cyril Cameron was a Protectionist Party Senator contemporaneously with his service as MHR, 1901–1903 then from 1906 to 1913.

Parliament of Australia
New division	Member for Tasmania; 1901–1902; Served alongside: Braddon, Fysh, O'Malley, Piesse	Division abolished
New division	Member for Tasmania; 1902–1903; Served alongside: Braddon, Fysh, Hartnoll, O'Malley	Division abolished
Preceded by Edward Braddon	Member for Wilmot; 1904–1906	Succeeded by Llewellyn Atkinson
