= John McCall (Australian politician) =

Australian politician

Sir John McCall KCMG

Member of the Tasmanian House of Assembly for West Devon
- In office 12 November 1888 – December 1893
- Preceded by: Edward Braddon
- Succeeded by: Sir Edward Braddon
- In office 30 April 1901 – April 1909
- Preceded by: Sir Edward Braddon
- Succeeded by: District abolished

Personal details
- Born: 10 August 1860 East Devonport, Tasmania
- Died: 27 June 1919 (aged 58) London, England
- Resting place: Putney Vale Cemetery
- Spouses: Mary Chickie (m. 1880; died 1896) Claire Pearson Reynolds (m. 1900)
- Education: University of Glasgow
- Profession: Medical doctor

Sir John McCall KCMG (10 August 1860 – 27 June 1919) was an Australian politician.

== History ==
Born in Devonport, Tasmania the son of John Hair McCall, MLC, he studied for his Doctorate of Medicine at the University of Glasgow, returning to Tasmania in 1881. In 1888, he was elected to the Tasmanian House of Assembly as the Protectionist member for West Devon. He served until 1893, and then again from 1901 to 1909. He then took up the post of Tasmania's agent-general in London, where he served with distinction and died ten years later.

== Family ==
Sir John was married twice; to Mary Chickie (died 28 February 1896), whom he married in Glasgow, and with whom he had a son and a daughter:

The son, also named Dr. John McCall, married Marjorie MacDonald of Fremantle in 1918. Their 3-year old son John died choking on a peanut; Marjorie died of pneumonia a week later.
The daughter, Mary "Mollie" McCall, married Commander Hewitt in 1923;

On 20 November 1900, he married Claire Pearson Reynolds (c. 1882 – 3 June 1945), with whom he had two sons: G. Donald McCall of Mont Albert, Victoria and the Rt Rev. Theodore Bruce McCall home secretary of the (Anglican) Australian Board of Missions and Bishop of Rockhampton and Wangaratta.
