= William Hartnoll =

Australian politician (1841–1932)

The Honourable William Hartnoll
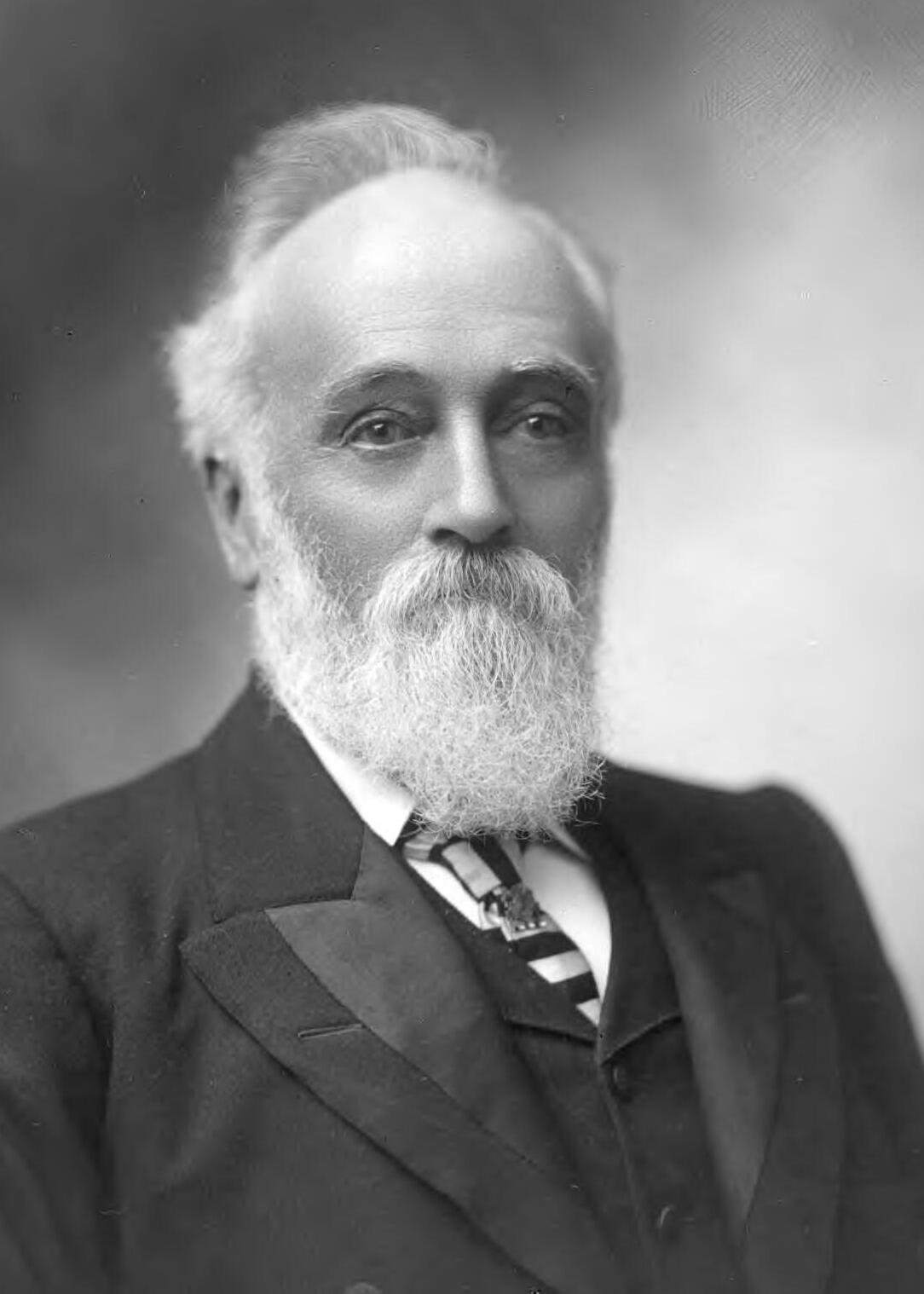

Member of the Australian Parliament for Tasmania
- In office 26 March 1902 – 16 December 1903 Serving with Edward Braddon, Norman Cameron, Philip Fysh, King O'Malley
- Preceded by: Frederick Piesse
- Succeeded by: Division abolished

Personal details
- Born: 17 April 1841 Longford, Tasmania
- Died: 11 July 1932 (aged 91) Evandale, Tasmania, Australia
- Party: Free Trade Party
- Occupation: Shopkeeper

William Hartnoll (17 April 1841 – 11 July 1932) was an Australian politician. Born in Longford, Van Diemen's Land, he was educated at Launceston Grammar School before becoming a shopkeeper, auctioneer and landowner. In 1884 he was elected to the Tasmanian House of Assembly as the member for South Launceston, transferring to Launceston in 1897. He was Minister for Lands and Works from 1892 to 1894. In 1901, Hartnoll contested the first federal election as a Free Trade candidate for the five-member Division of Tasmania, but was unsuccessful. However, in 1902, he was elected to the Australian House of Representatives in a by-election for Tasmania resulting from the death of sitting Free Trade MP Frederick Piesse. Hartnoll was successful, although there was a legal challenge to his election because he had nominated for candidacy via telegram and not by submitting a signed nomination form. In 1903, following the division of Tasmania into individual electorates, he contested the seat of Bass, but was defeated by the Protectionist candidate David Storrer. He died in 1932.

Parliament of Australia
Preceded by Frederick Piesse	Member for Tasmania; 1902 – 1903; Served alongside: Braddon, Cameron, Fysh, O'Malley	Division abolished
