= Henry Dobson =

Australian politician (1841–1918)

The Honourable Henry Dobson
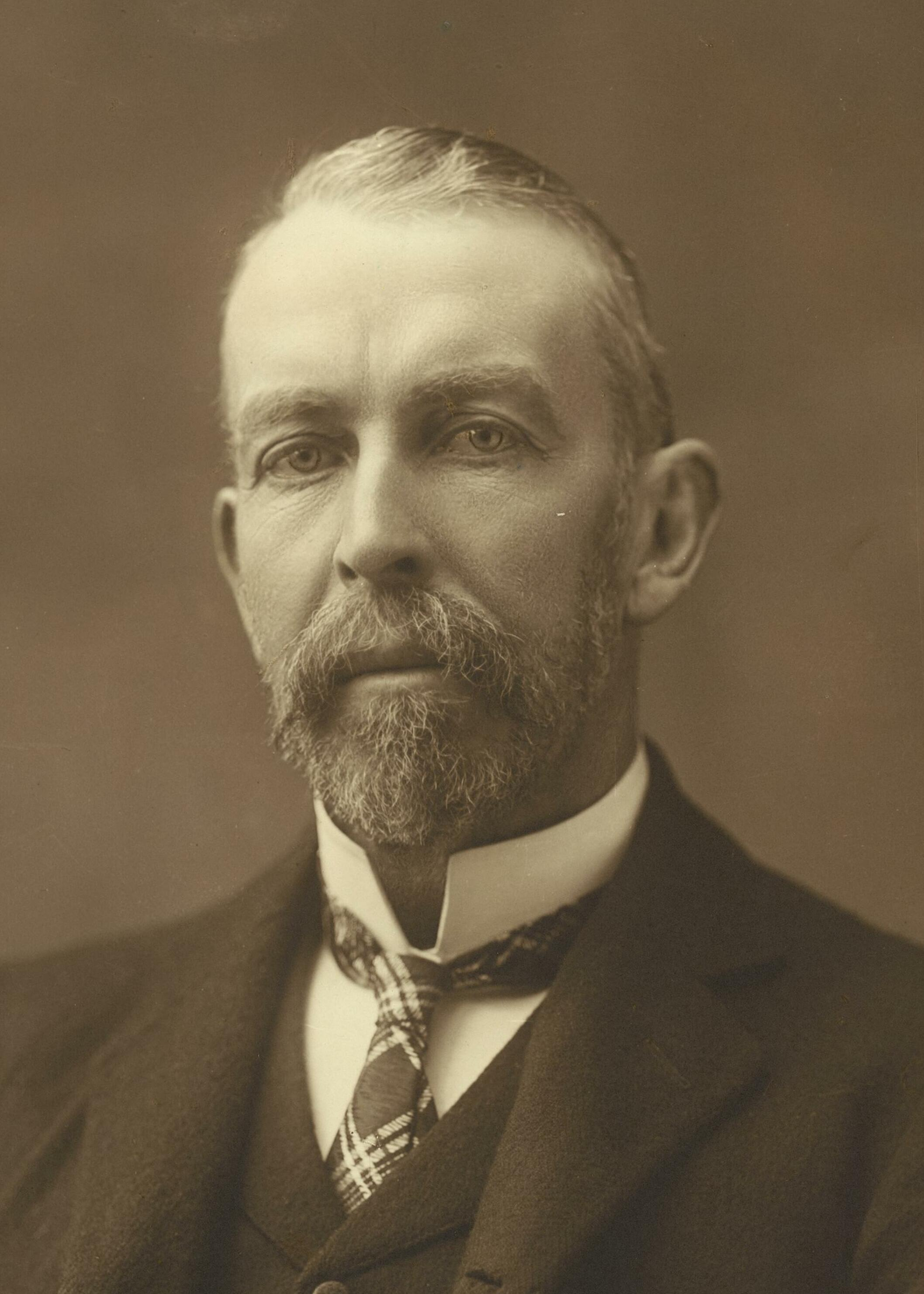

17th Premier of Tasmania
- In office 17 August 1892 – 14 April 1894
- Preceded by: Philip Fysh
- Succeeded by: Edward Braddon

Senator for Tasmania
- In office 29 March 1901 – 30 June 1910

Personal details
- Born: 24 December 1841 Hobart Town, Van Diemen's Land
- Died: 10 October 1918 (aged 76) Hobart, Tasmania, Australia
- Spouse: Emily Dobson
- Profession: Lawyer

Henry Dobson (24 December 1841 – 10 October 1918) was an Australian politician, who served as a member of the Tasmanian House of Assembly and later of the Australian Senate. He was the 17th Premier of Tasmania from 17 August 1892 to 14 April 1894.

== Early life and legal career ==
Dobson was born in Hobart Town, Van Diemen's Land (now Tasmania), the son of John Dobson and full brother to Alfred and half-brother to William Lambert Dobson, and Frank Dobson. Dobson was educated at The Hutchins School and worked for a merchant firm before commencing legal training with Allport, Robson & Allport. He was admitted to the Tasmanian Bar in 1846, and partnered with William Giblin from 1865 to 1870, and was a senior partner in the law firm Dobson, Mitchell & Allport (started by his father).

== Political career ==
=== Tasmanian House of Assembly ===
Dobson's political career began on 12 August 1891, when he was elected to the Tasmanian House of Assembly representing the electorate of Brighton. He was quickly made Leader of the Opposition the next month, and became Premier of Tasmania on 17 August 1892 after the fall of Philip Fysh's government.

Dobson had a keen interest in education, and introduced compulsory education legislation into the Tasmanian parliament. He also promoted Tasmania as a tourist destination and fruit-growing centre, attributes which it remains known for today. Economic factors required him to make difficult decisions, and when a proposed retrenchment program was rejected in the Parliament, Dobson obtained a dissolution from the Governor, and then resigned as Premier on 14 April 1894 when the situation remained unchanged after the election.

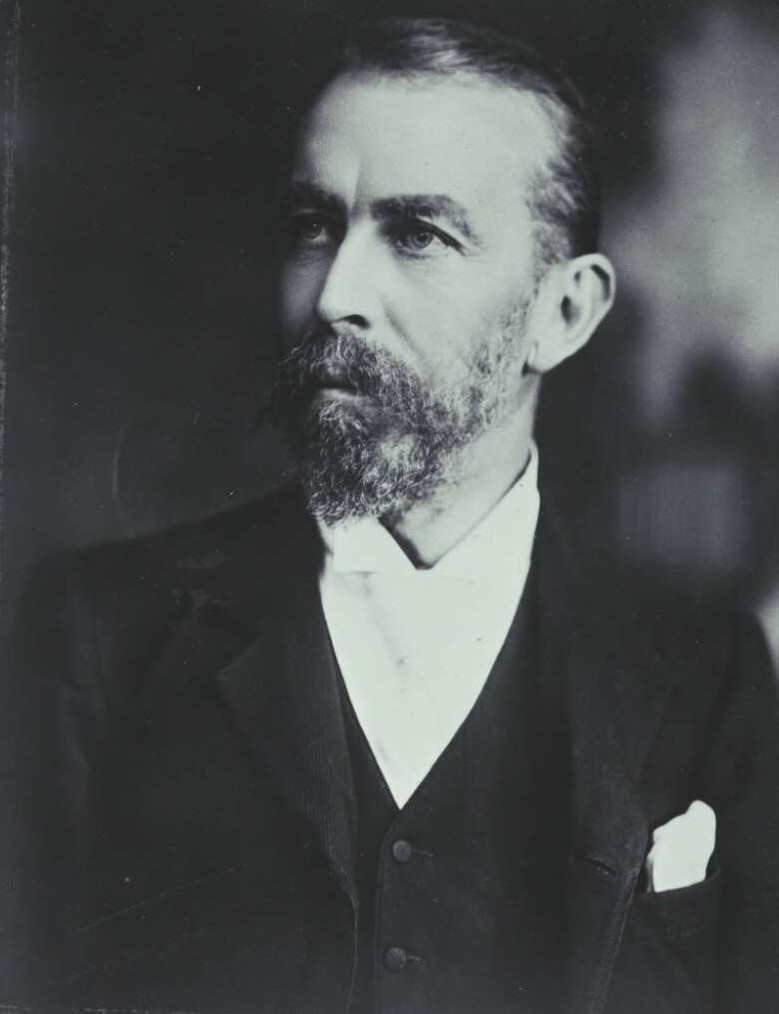
Dobson at the 1898 Australasian Federal Convention.

After retiring as Premier, Dobson remained in his seat until he retired on 9 March 1900.

=== Senator, 1901–1910 ===
Dobson was elected to the Senate at the 1901 federal election. He placed fourth on the ballot in Tasmania and was declared elected to a three-year term. He was re-elected to a full six-year term at the 1903 election, topping the poll in Tasmania. He was defeated for re-election at the 1910 election with his term concluded on 30 June 1910.

In federal parliament, Dobson was associated with the Free Trade Party and joined the new Liberal Party upon its creation in 1909. He spoke on a wide range of topics and was protective of the rights of the Senate and small states, frequently criticising what he viewed as overreach by the federal government. Despite the constitution's provisions, he believed that a new national capital would be a waste of money and that Sydney as the largest city should serve as the capital. Dobson served on the Standing Orders Committee throughout his time in the Senate and also served two terms on the Disputed Returns and Qualifications Committee. He was Chairman of Committees from 1908 to 1910.

== Later life ==
After retiring from politics, Dobson turned his efforts to promoting Tasmanian tourism. He founded and was president of the Tasmanian Tourist Association from 1893, helped found the Tourist and Information Bureau and the Scenery Preservation Board in 1915, and was chairman of the National Park Board from 1917 to 1918.

Dobson died on 10 October 1918 in Hobart.

Political offices
Preceded by Philip Fysh	Premier of Tasmania; 1892 – 1894	Succeeded by Edward Braddon
