= King O'Malley =

Early 20th-century American-Australian politician (c.1858-1953)

The Honourable King O'Malley
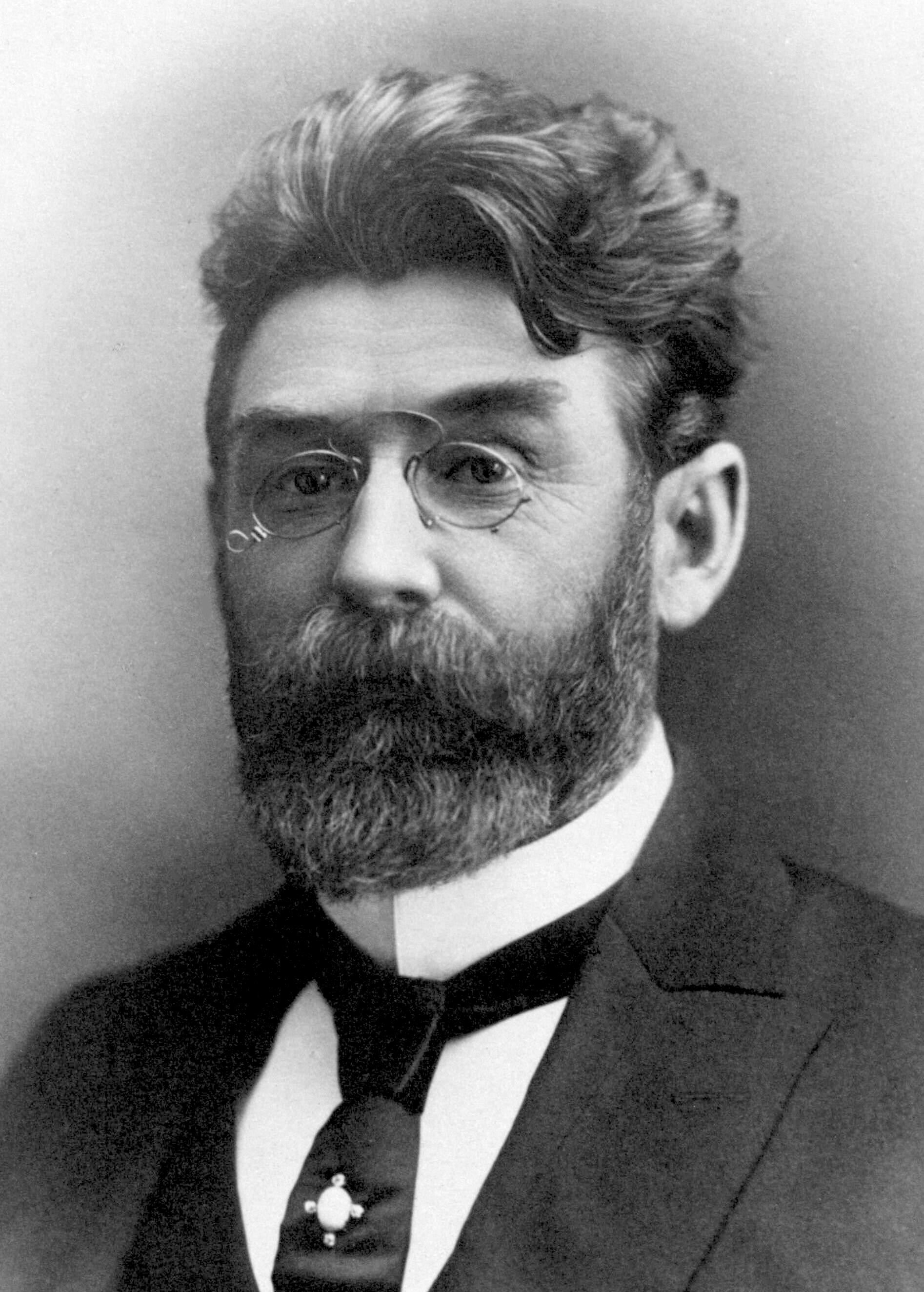

Minister for Home Affairs
- In office 27 October 1915 – 14 November 1916
- Prime Minister: Billy Hughes
- Preceded by: William Archibald
- Succeeded by: Fred Bamford
- In office 29 April 1910 – 24 June 1913
- Prime Minister: Andrew Fisher
- Preceded by: George Fuller
- Succeeded by: Joseph Cook

Member of the Australian Parliament for Darwin
- In office 16 December 1903 – 5 May 1917
- Preceded by: New seat
- Succeeded by: Charles Howroyd

Member of the Australian Parliament for Tasmania
- In office 29 March 1901 – 16 December 1903 Serving with Edward Braddon, Norman Cameron, Philip Fysh, Frederick Piesse/William Hartnoll
- Preceded by: New seat
- Succeeded by: Division abolished

Member of the South Australian Parliament for Encounter Bay
- In office 25 April 1896 – 29 April 1899
- Preceded by: Henry Edward Downer
- Succeeded by: Charles Tucker

Personal details
- Born: 2 July 1858? Possibly Kansas Territory, United States (Note: Claimed to be born in Quebec)
- Died: 20 December 1953 (aged 95) Albert Park, Victoria, Australia
- Party: Labor
- Other political affiliations: Republican (US)
- Spouse: Amy Garrod (m. 1910)
- Occupation: Insurance salesman; Politician

King O'Malley (2 July 1858 not confirmed – 20 December 1953) was an American-born Australian politician who served in the House of Representatives from 1901 to 1917, and served two terms as Minister for Home Affairs (1910–1913; 1915–16). He is remembered for his role in the development of the national capital Canberra as well as his advocacy for the creation of a national bank.

O'Malley was of American origin and arrived in Australia in 1888. He worked as an insurance salesman before entering politics, in both professions making use of his knack for oratory and publicity stunts. He served a single term in the South Australian House of Assembly (1896–1899), before moving to Tasmania and winning election to the House of Representatives at the inaugural 1901 federal election. O'Malley was a political radical, and joined the Labor Party (ALP) upon its creation, despite his status as one of the wealthiest members of parliament. He was a keen proponent of banking reform, especially the creation of a national bank, and successfully lobbied for its inclusion in the Labor platform. He was dissatisfied with the initial form of the Commonwealth Bank, but later proclaimed himself as its "father". However, the amount of credit he deserves for its creation has been debated.

After Labor won the 1910 federal election, O'Malley was elected to cabinet by the Labor caucus, over the objections of Prime Minister Andrew Fisher. As home affairs minister, he oversaw the start of construction of the Trans-Australian Railway and the early development of the new national capital, including the design competition won by Walter Burley Griffin. A temperance advocate, he banned the sale of alcohol in the Australian Capital Territory. O'Malley's second term as home affairs minister was troublesome, marked by conflict with Prime Minister Billy Hughes, among others. O'Malley remained loyal to the ALP during the 1916 party split, but lost his seat at the 1917 election.

O'Malley spent his retirement defending his legacy. His political views combined with his personal background and personality traits made him a controversial figure during his career, and his life has continued to attract public interest. On his death, he was the last surviving member of the first Australian federal parliament.

== Early life ==
=== Birth and parentage ===
Uncertainty exists about the details of O'Malley's birth and upbringing, largely due to the inconsistent accounts he provided throughout his life. He was probably born on 2 July 1858 in the U.S. Territory of Kansas. Numerous sources during his lifetime recorded his year of birth as 1858 but, after about 1940, he began to exaggerate his age, claiming a birth year of 1854. At some point, he also began to celebrate his birthday on 4 July, coinciding with Independence Day in the United States. His private diaries record that, until 1947, he personally celebrated his birthday on 2 July, but then apparently shifted the date by two days to emphasize his American origins. As a result, O'Malley's obituaries listed his date of birth as 4 July 1854.

During his political career, O'Malley claimed to have been born in Quebec, at a location called "Stanford Farm", close to the U.S. border. He said that no birth certificate existed, because the registration of births was not yet standard in frontier regions. That account of his birth differed from those he related at other periods of his life. In an 1893 letter to the editor of the Adelaide Advertiser, he proclaimed himself "a humble sovereign citizen of that supreme nation, the United States". Towards the end of his life he wrote, "I am an American [...] that is the truth". O’Malley's place of birth had implications for his status as a member of parliament. If he was born in Canada, as he claimed, he was a British subject and faced no eligibility restrictions. If he was born in the United States, his election to federal parliament was in violation of section 44(i) of the constitution. Similar provisions applied in South Australia and Tasmania, where he also ran for parliament. O'Malley's claim of Canadian birth was received with scepticism during his lifetime, and has generally been regarded as unreliable. Although he was unable to provide any proof beyond a sworn affidavit, political opponents were also unable to prove conclusively that he was born an American.

On his 1910 marriage certificate, O'Malley listed his parents as Ellen (née King) and William O'Malley, and his father's occupation as rancher. His unusual given name was supposedly taken from his mother's family name, a common practice in the United States. His parents’ identities have not been corroborated, and other information that he gave on the certificate was of dubious accuracy. In 1913, O'Malley stated that his father was born in Ballymena, in the north of Ireland. The following year, he said that his parents were British subjects born in the United Kingdom, which included Ireland at the time. However, in old age he referred to his "American-born parents". O'Malley claimed to have a brother and sister, and apparently stayed with his brother Walter in the small community of Kelly, Kansas, when he returned to the U.S. in 1917.

=== Childhood ===
O'Malley grew up in Kansas, possibly in Pawnee County. (Note: Contemporary newspapers from the 1880s generally described O'Malley as a Kansan. One of the few surviving documents from his early life is a letter from his friend Dan C. Kennedy, in which Kennedy "reminisces about Pawnee County in a way which suggest that O'Malley knew the area very well, perhaps from childhood".) O'Malley probably had little formal education, and his writing was "usually deficient in style, grammar and spelling". According to O'Malley's own account, his father was killed in the American Civil War when he was a young boy and he was sent to live with his aunt and uncle, Edward and Caroline O'Malley, in New York City, where his uncle ran a small bank near Wall Street. O'Malley began working at the bank at the age of 14. He was promoted to teller at 16 and was handling loans by 19. After a disagreement with his uncle, he left the bank at the age of 22 and took a job selling insurance. Hoyle (1981) regards the basic facts of O'Malley's account to be accurate, because he had a detailed knowledge of American banking practices and of New York City. However, he expresses doubt over the details. Henderson (2011) describes it as "at least partially true", although she notes "there is no evidence to suggest that he ever lived in New York".

== Adult life in the United States ==
Before he moved to Australia, O'Malley lived a transient lifestyle on the west coast of the United States, as an insurance salesman and real estate agent. There are contemporary references to him in California, Oregon, and Washington Territory, as well as in his presumptive home state of Kansas. At various times, O'Malley sold policies for the Northwestern Mutual Life Insurance Company, the Home Life Insurance Company of New York, and the Equitable Life Insurance Company. In April 1887, the Chicago Inter Ocean reported that he had forwarded policies amounting to $200,000 from Oregon, an immense sum at the time. He may have also made money engaging in land speculation, because he was wealthy enough to invest in property in Seattle, which he retained for several decades. Surviving records indicate that he had "somewhat dubious" business practices – in 1887, he made a series of large deposits at a bank in Corvallis, Oregon, then abruptly withdrew his entire account.

As a young man, O'Malley became a devotee of the Temperance movement. In 1881, his apparent home state of Kansas became one of the first to enact statewide prohibition. He gave fiery public speeches in the towns where he sold insurance, warning against the dangers of what he called "stagger juice". O'Malley supported the pro-temperance Republican Party and, in 1884, stumped for the unsuccessful campaign by James Blaine to become the Republican presidential candidate. O'Malley later claimed that, if Blaine had been elected president, he would have been appointed ambassador to Chile.

While in Texas, O'Malley founded a church, taking the title of "First Bishop of the Waterlily Rock Bound Church, the Red Skin Temple of the Cayuse Nation", in order to take advantage of a government land grant then being offered to churches. In 1881, O'Malley married Rosy Wilmot, who died from tuberculosis shortly before she was due to give birth in 1886. O'Malley claimed he had contracted the disease from her, and in 1888, having been given six months to live, he sailed for Queensland, Australia.

== Move to Australia ==
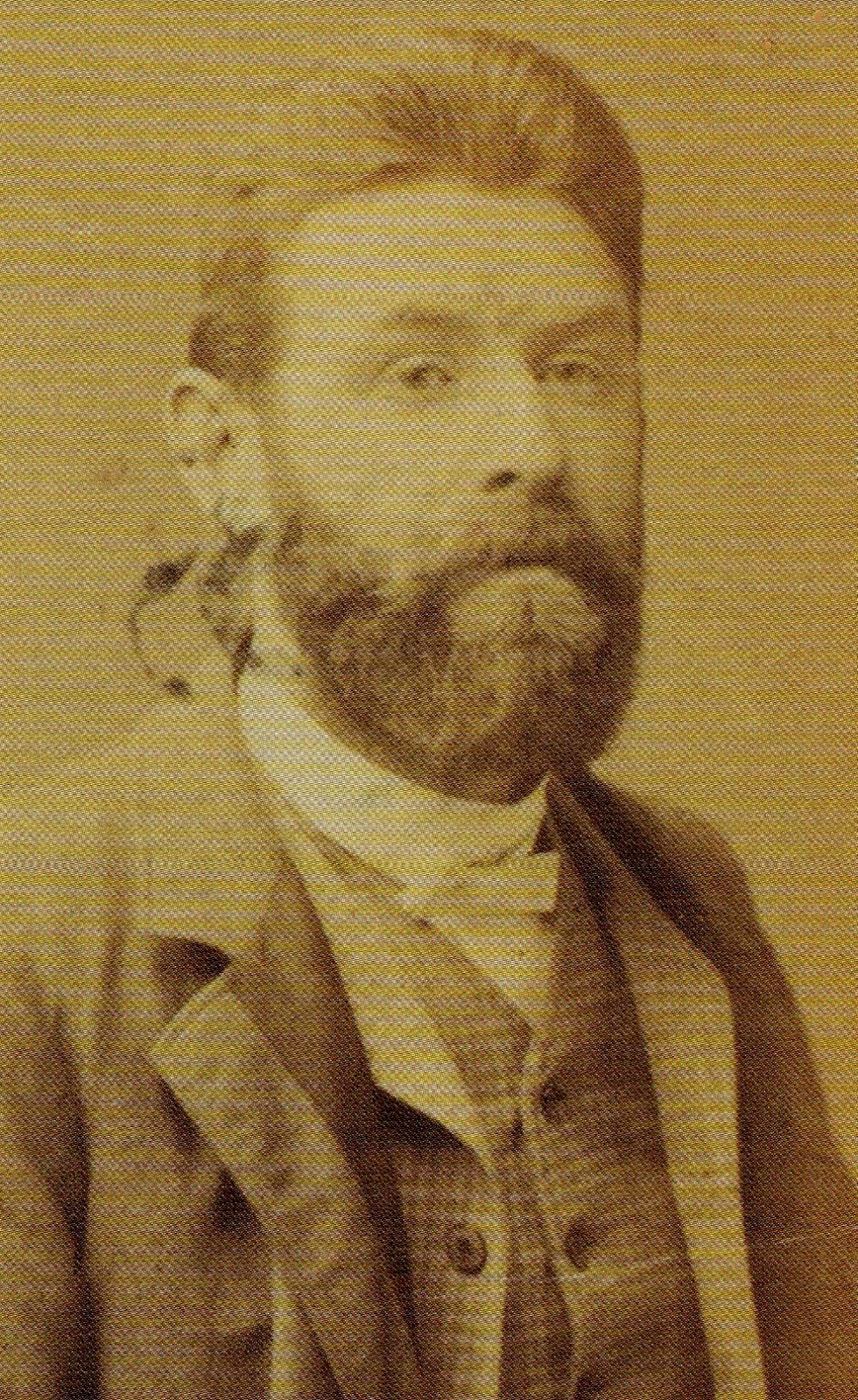
Photo of O'Malley from the official album of the Melbourne Centennial Exhibition, 1888

In April 1888, the Oregon City Courier published an article entitled "King O’Malley Exposed". The newspaper reported that O'Malley and a partner had "placed policies to the amount of tens of thousands of dollars by misrepresentation", and that the Home Life Insurance Company was actively warning customers not to take any money from him. O'Malley left for Australia a few months later, arriving in Sydney in late July 1888. He travelled from San Francisco, via Hawaii, aboard the SS Mariposa. He then went south to attend the Melbourne Centennial Exhibition, and his photograph appears in the exhibition's official albums, in which he is listed as a representative of an American glass manufacturer.

O'Malley's own version of his arrival in Australia was that he moved there for health reasons, because he was suffering from tuberculosis. He supposedly arrived in the country at Port Alma, Queensland, then took up residence in a cave at Emu Park, where an Aboriginal man named Coowonga nursed him back to health. He subsequently walked overland to Sydney and Melbourne before eventually reaching Adelaide. Of that account, Hoyle (1981) states: "whatever its merits as a story, it has absolutely none as a statement of fact", and that O'Malley fabricated a dramatic arrival story to hide the fact that he left the United States to escape embezzlement allegations. Documentary evidence places him in Sydney and Melbourne in 1888, so it would have required a rapid recovery from tuberculosis, followed by a walking journey of hundreds of kilometres, all within a time span of several months.

== South Australia ==
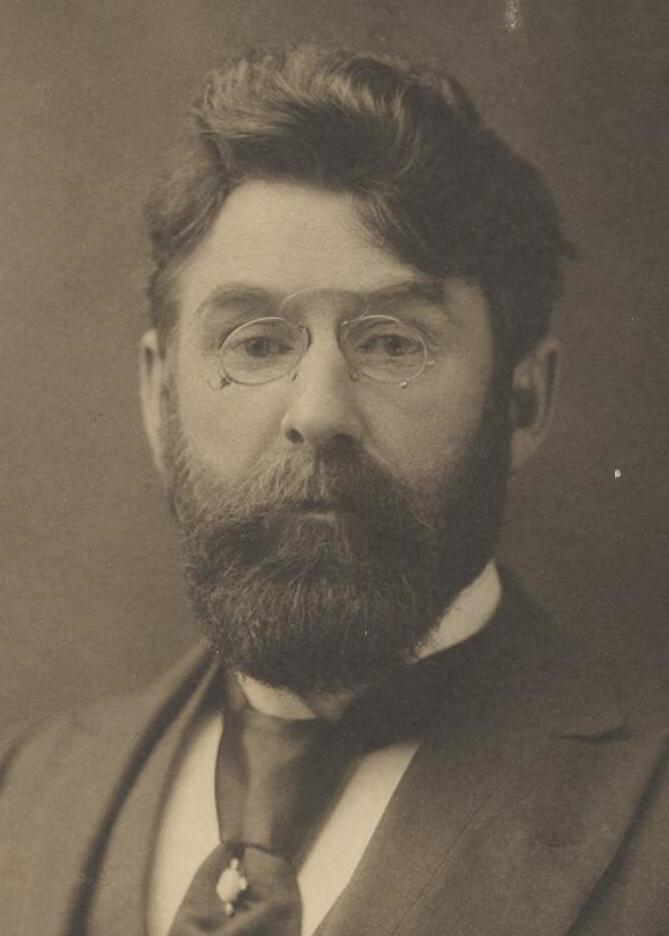
Undated photo

By May 1893, O'Malley was living in Adelaide, South Australia. During that year's banking crisis, the South Australian Register published a number of letters from him on financial matters. He continued to sell life insurance, excelling at self-promotion. In April 1894, as a publicity stunt, he announced his candidacy for a by-election in the seat of East Torrens, but never formally nominated.

In January 1896, the Register reported that O'Malley would be a candidate for the seat of Encounter Bay at the upcoming general election. Encounter Bay was a rural seat electing two MPs to the House of Assembly. Although not a resident of the electorate, O'Malley was "apparently a frequent visitor to the area [...] popular with various people in Goolwa and Victor Harbor". He stood as an independent, surprising observers by topping the poll ahead of William Carpenter of the United Labor Party (ULP), sitting MP Henry Downer of the Australasian National League, and former MP Charles Hussey. O'Malley enjoyed strong support among the newly enfranchised female voters, who were sympathetic to his pro-temperance views.

At the opening of parliament in June 1896, O'Malley and seven others refused to take an oath of office and were refused their seats. They were eventually allowed to make affirmations and take their place. After his election, O'Malley took up residence in a coffee palace on Hindley Street, Adelaide, although he made frequent visits to his electorate. In Parliament, he concentrated on social matters, starting with a proposal to regulate barmaids, the use of which he regarded as a social evil, but his attempt to amend a government liquor licensing bill to that end was unsuccessful. O'Malley next introduced a bill requiring seats to be provided for shop assistants, which also failed, followed by a successful motion calling for train carriages to be provided with lavatories and better lighting. A private member's bill he introduced in 1897 eventually passed as the Legitimation Act 1898, allowing for the legitimation of children born out of wedlock whose parents subsequently married. By that time, O'Malley had aligned himself with the government of Charles Kingston, declaring himself "on the side of the ministry" and calling Kingston "the greatest democratic leader this country had ever known". O'Malley strongly supported federation and, in a series of parliamentary speeches, championed the U.S. constitution as a model for Australia. However, little notice was taken of his views.

O'Malley was defeated when he stood for re-election in Encounter Bay at the April 1899 general election, with William Carpenter outpolling him by 14 votes, and Charles Tucker outpolling both. The election was fought largely on the temperance issue, with Tucker enjoying the support of the Licensed Victuallers' Association. The supporters of each camp clashed on a number of occasions, culminating in a "near riot" at Goolwa the day after the election. A petition was subsequently lodged against Tucker's return, on the grounds that he had attempted to bribe electors. The result was declared void in July 1899 and another election ordered, which was equally acrimonious but resulted in a clear victory for Tucker against O'Malley.

== Federal politics ==
=== Beginnings ===
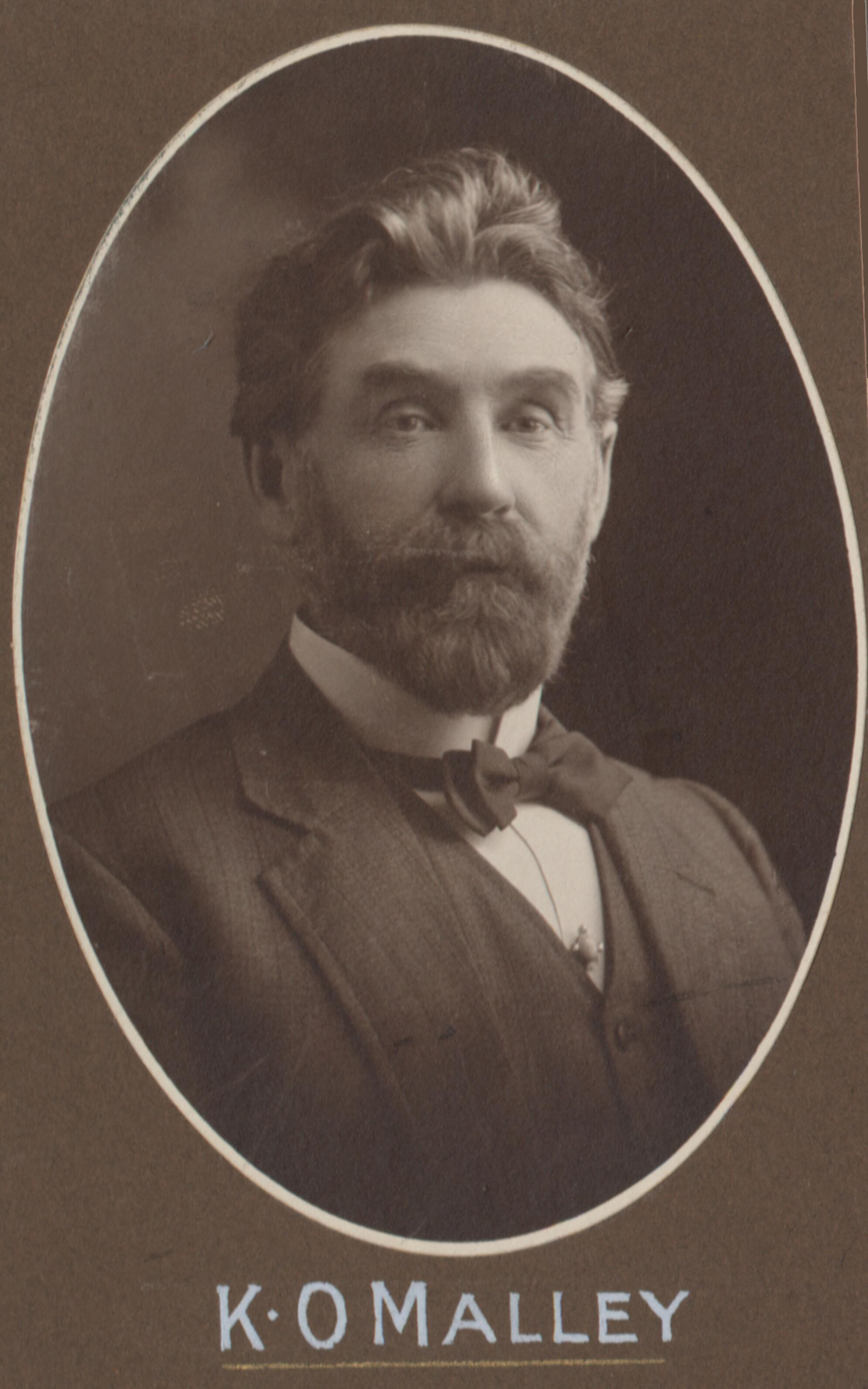
O'Malley in 1908

O'Malley was defeated at the 1899 election, and the following year he moved to Tasmania, the smallest of the Australian colonies. There, a tall, fashionably-dressed American, preaching the gospel and radical democracy, drew immediate attention. At the 1901 federal election he became one of the five members of the House of Representatives for Tasmania. In 1903, he was elected as the member for Darwin. Although there was no Labour Party in Tasmania at that time, he joined the Labour Party Caucus when the parliament assembled in Melbourne.

Historian Gavin Souter describes O'Malley at this time:

O'Malley's monstrously overgrown persona seemed to be inhabited simultaneously by a spruiker from Barnum's three-ring circus, a hell-and-tarnation revivalist, and a four-flushing Yankee Congressman. He was a moderately big man, auburn-haired with watchful grey eyes and a red-brown beard, wearing a wide-brimmed felt hat, blue-grey suit with huge lapels and a low-cut vest, loose cravat with a diamond collar stud, and in the centre of his cream silk shirt-front a fiery opal.

=== Reputation ===
O'Malley was clearly one of the more prominent and colourful members of the Parliament. He became a prominent advocate of a national bank as a means of providing cheap credit for farmers and small businessmen, but his radical ideas were not widely accepted, and many regarded him as a charlatan.

He was not a member of Chris Watson's first Labour ministry in 1904, nor of Andrew Fisher's first ministry in 1908. But, in April 1910, the Caucus elected him to the ministry of Fisher's second government. Ross McMullin, who wrote an official history of the ALP, suggested that "his election as minister was probably attributable in part to the fact that several caucus colleagues owed him money".

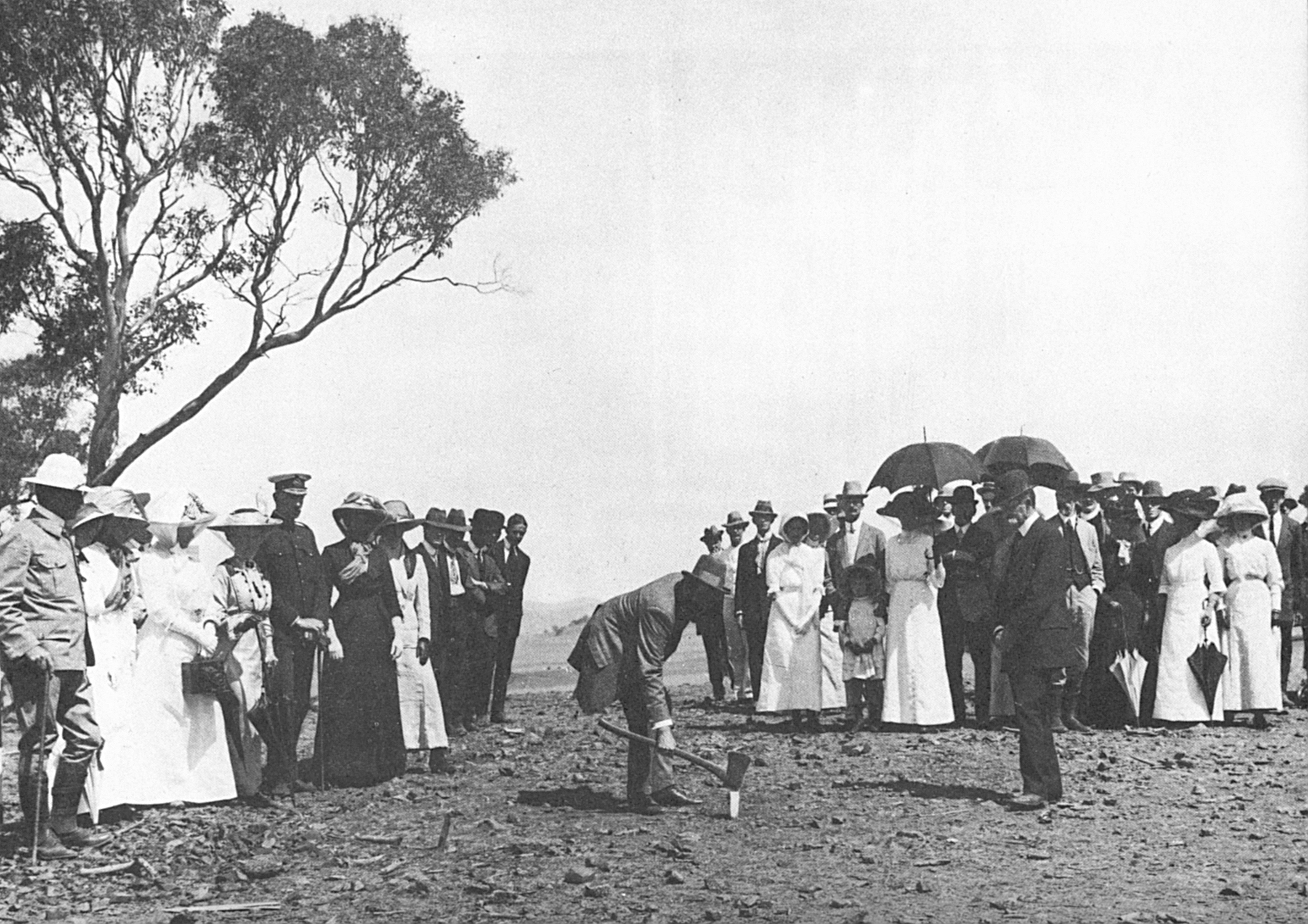
O'Malley drives in first peg of Canberra.

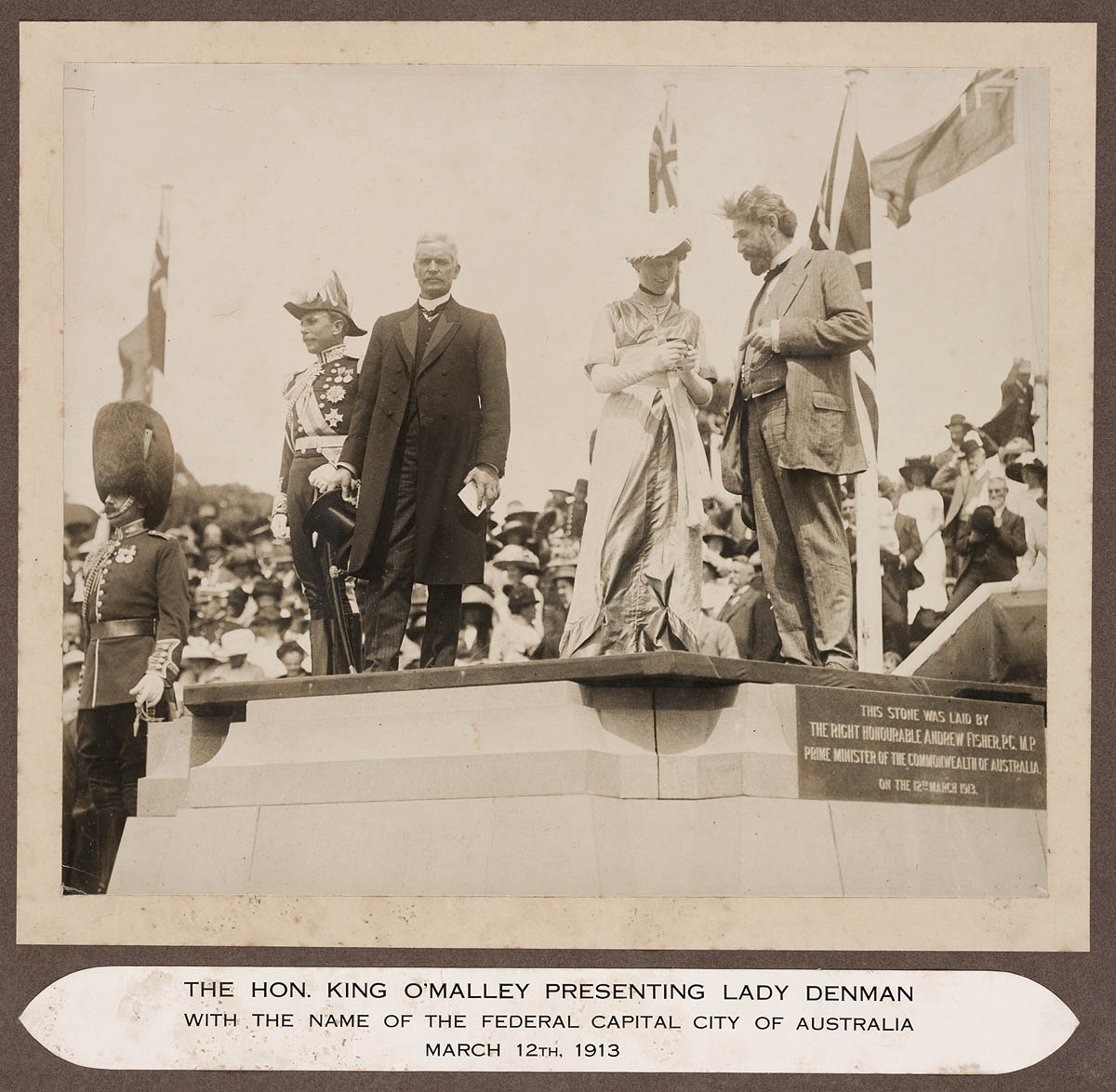
O'Malley at the naming of Canberra ceremony

=== Canberra ===
O'Malley is well known for his involvement in the development of the national capital, Canberra. Less well known is that, in the parliamentary ballots in October 1908 to select the area in which the capital would be located, he had not voted for Canberra. O'Malley voted for the rival site of Dalgety in the ninth and final ballot, having voted for Bombala and later Tooma in earlier elimination ballots.

O'Malley became Minister for Home Affairs, and played a prominent role in the planning and development of Canberra. He declared American architect Walter Burley Griffin winner of the town planning competition. On 20 February 1913, O'Malley drove in the first peg to mark the start of the development of the city. He was also present at the ceremony for the naming of Canberra on 12 March 1913.

As a teetotaler, he was responsible for the highly unpopular ban on selling alcohol in the Australian Capital Territory, which lasted from 1911 to 1928. He could also claim credit for beginning the building of the Trans-Australian Railway from Port Augusta to Kalgoorlie.

=== Commonwealth Bank ===
O'Malley also agitated for the establishment of the Commonwealth Bank of Australia, a state-owned savings and investment bank. However, contrary to his later claims, he was not the bank's sole creator. He later wrote that he had led a "torpedo squad" in Caucus to force a reluctant Cabinet to establish the bank, but historians do not accept that. In fact, Prime Minister Fisher was the bank's principal architect. Partly to allay fears of "funny money" aroused by O'Malley's populist rhetoric, Fisher ensured that the bank would be run on firm "sound money" principles, and it did not provide the easy credit for farmers that the radicals desired.

=== Final years in parliament ===
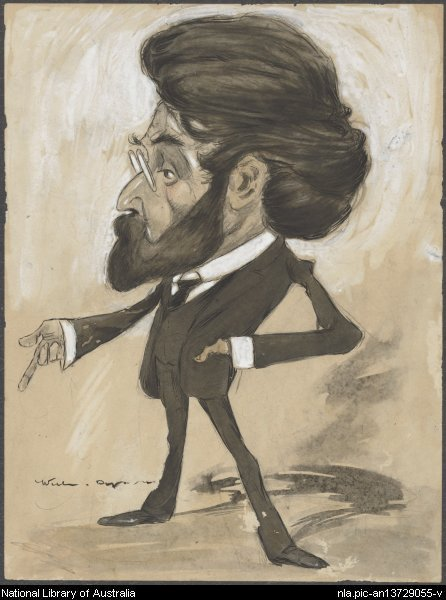
Caricature of O'Malley by Will Dyson

Labor was defeated at the 1913 federal election and, when it returned to office at the 1914 federal election, O'Malley was not re-elected to the Cabinet. In October 1915, however, Fisher retired and O'Malley returned to office in the first ministry of Billy Hughes, again as Minister for Home Affairs. But a year later, the government split over the determination of Hughes to introduce conscription to fill the ranks of Australia's armed forces in World War I. Although he was not an active anti-conscriptionist, O'Malley was pressured by Hughes to resign his portfolio, but he refused to do so. He finally lost office on 13 November 1916 when Hughes and twenty-four other Labor members walked out of the Caucus and formed the National Labor ministry.

Hughes called the 1917 federal election, and O'Malley was heavily defeated in his northern Tasmanian seat of Darwin by former Labor colleague Charles Howroyd, a conscriptionist who was running for Hughes' Nationalist Party. O'Malley suffered a swing of almost 15 percent against him, and was one of many Labor parliamentarians swept out in the massive Nationalist landslide. He stood unsuccessfully in the seat of Denison in 1919, and in Bass in 1922, but he was never again returned to elected office.

=== Racism ===
On 23 April 1902, during the debate on the Commonwealth Franchise Act 1902 and the question of Maori suffrage, he claimed that "an aboriginal is not as intelligent as a Maori. There is no scientific evidence that he is a human being at all."

== Later life ==
Although he was 63 at the time of his defeat, he retired to Melbourne and devoted his time to building up his own legend, particularly in relation to the Commonwealth Bank, and to polemical journalism on a variety of pet causes. He lived to be about 95. At the time of his death, he was the last surviving member of the first Australian Parliament and last surviving MP who served when the first Prime Minister, Edmund Barton, was in office. Furthermore, O'Malley was the last surviving member of Andrew Fisher's second Cabinet.

== Legacy ==
O'Malley's importance in developing the national capital is remembered in Canberra, with the suburb of O'Malley being named after him. A pub in Canberra, King O'Malley's Irish Pub in Civic, is also named after him – a tongue-in-cheek reference to his sponsorship of the unpopular ban on selling alcohol in the Australian Capital Territory during Canberra's early years.

Additionally, he and his wife Amy left their estate to create scholarship opportunities to support students studying "domestic economy" (now referred to as Home economics). Thirty scholarships were to be awarded annually, proportionally across the states and territories according to their then population. The first of the scholarships was awarded by the King and Amy O'Malley Trust in 1986, and they continue to be awarded.

O'Malley is the subject of a 1970 musical play The Legend of King O'Malley by Michael Boddy and Bob Ellis.

== See also ==
- History of Canberra

== Notes ==
Political offices
Preceded by George Fuller	Minister for Home Affairs; 1910 – 1913	Succeeded by Joseph Cook
Preceded by William Archibald	Minister for Home Affairs; 1915 – 1916	Succeeded by Frederick Bamford
Parliament of Australia
New division	Member for Tasmania; 1901 – 1902; Served alongside: Braddon, Cameron, Fysh, Piesse	Division abolished
New division	Member for Tasmania; 1902 – 1903; Served alongside: Braddon, Cameron, Fysh, Hartnoll	Division abolished
New division	Member for Darwin; 1903 – 1917	Succeeded by Charles Howroyd
