= Philip Fysh =

Australian politician (1835–1919)

The Honourable Sir Philip Fysh KCMG
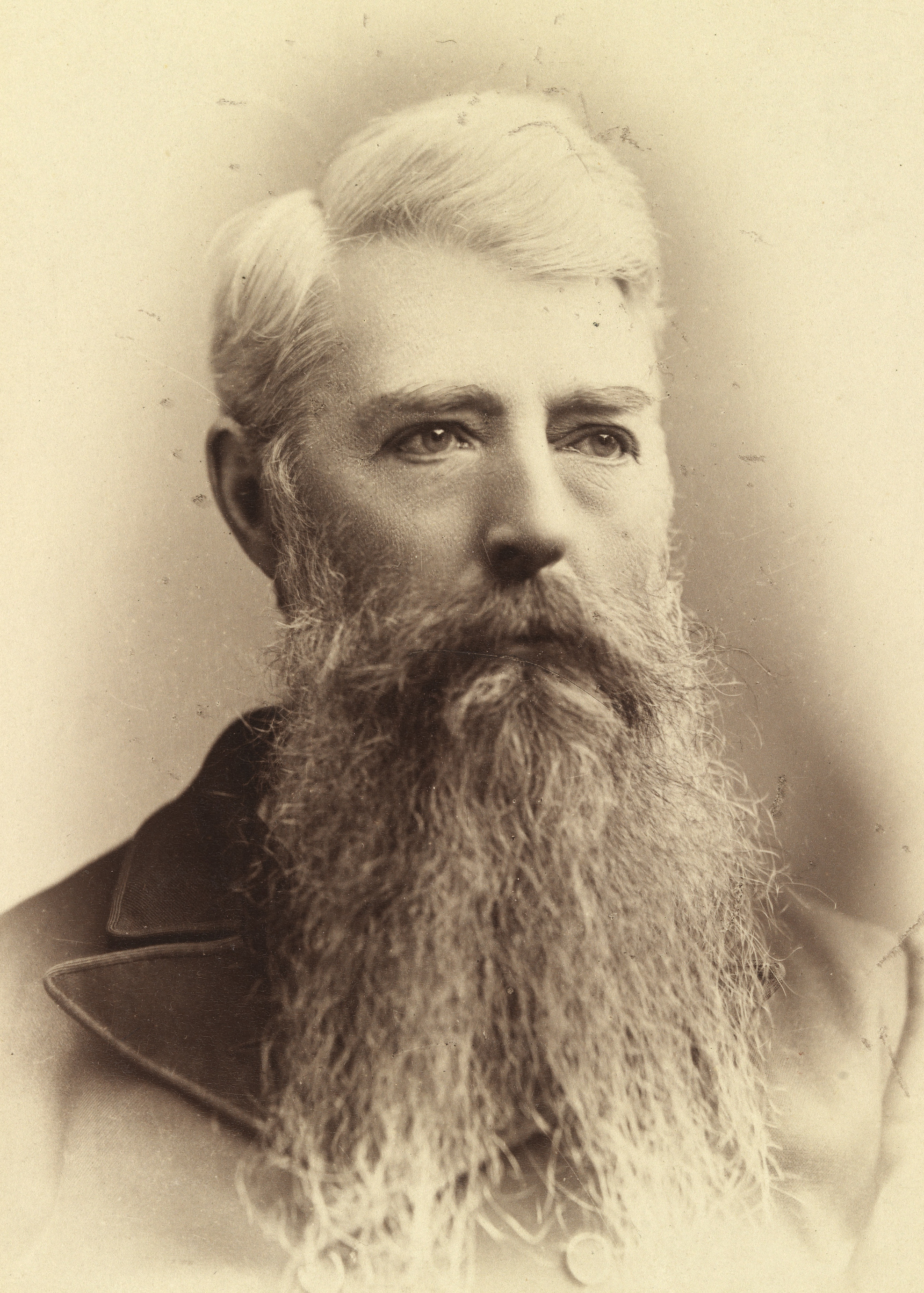

Postmaster-General of Australia
- In office 10 August 1903 – 27 April 1904
- Prime Minister: Edmund Barton; Alfred Deakin
- Preceded by: James Drake
- Succeeded by: Hugh Mahon

Premier of Tasmania
- In office 29 March 1887 – 17 August 1892
- Governor: Robert Hamilton
- Preceded by: James Agnew
- Succeeded by: Henry Dobson
- In office 9 August 1877 – 5 March 1878
- Governor: Frederick Weld
- Preceded by: Thomas Reibey
- Succeeded by: William Giblin

Personal details
- Born: Philip Oakley Fysh; 1 March 1835 Highbury, London, England
- Died: 20 December 1919 (aged 84) Sandy Bay, Tasmania, Australia
- Party: Protectionist (to 1909); Fusion (from 1909)
- Spouse: Esther Willis (m. 1856–1912)
- Relations: Hudson Fysh (nephew); William Willis (brother-in-law)
- Occupation: Merchant

Sir Philip Oakley Fysh KCMG (1 March 1835 – 20 December 1919) was an Australian politician and businessman. He was premier of Tasmania from 1877 to 1878 and from 1887 to 1892. After federation of the Australian colonies he served as a cabinet minister in the new federal government from 1901 to 1904.

Fysh was born in London. He arrived in Tasmania in 1859 and established a successful merchandising firm in Hobart. He was first elected to parliament in 1866 and served multiple terms in both the House of Assembly and Legislative Council. Fysh's first term as premier was brief and ended with his resignation after seven months. A committed liberal, he returned as premier in 1887 and oversaw the passage of social reforms as well as the enabling legislation for the University of Tasmania.

Fysh supported the federation movement. He was a Tasmanian representative on the Federal Council of Australasia and a delegate to the Australasian Federal Conventions in 1891 and 1897. Fysh was elected to the House of Representatives at the 1901 federal election and was appointed as a minister without portfolio in the Barton government, ensuring Tasmanian representation. He was postmaster-general under Edmund Barton and his successor Alfred Deakin from 1903 to 1904. He remained in parliament until 1910.

== Early life ==
Fysh was born on 1 March 1835 in Highbury, London, England. He was the son of Charlotte (née Fleet) and John Fysh. His father's family were originally from Norfolk.

Fysh attended school in Denmark Hill until the age of thirteen and subsequently began working as an office boy for a stockbroker. After two years he began working as a clerk for L. Stevenson & Sons, a shipping firm. After ten years of service, Fysh was appointed manager of Stevenson & Sons' agency in the colony of Tasmania. He arrived in Hobart in 1859 alongside his brother Frederick Fysh.

In 1862, during an economic downturn, Fysh bought out his employer's business and established P. O. Fysh & Co., a general merchant firm. He was said to have been "the leading wholesale businessman in Hobart".

== Colonial politics ==
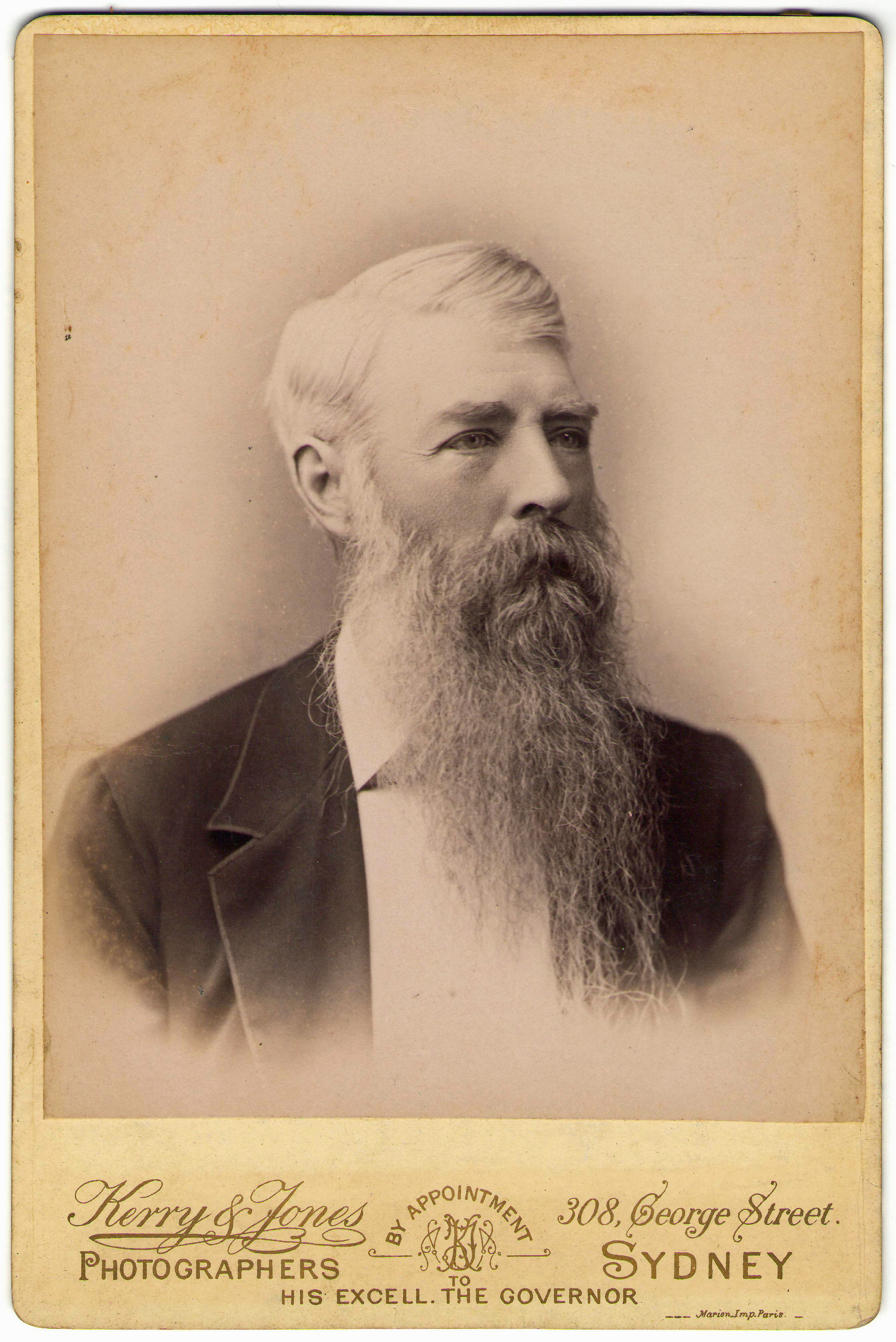
Fysh in 1891

Fysh served in the parliament of Tasmania for a cumulative total of nearly 30 years. He was a member of the Legislative Council for the seats of Hobart (1866–1869) and Buckingham (1870–1873, 1884–1894) and a member of the House of Assembly for the seats of East Hobart (1873–1878), North Hobart (1894–1897) and Hobart (1897–1898).

During his early career Fysh advocated economic development, including expansion of Tasmanian railways, and supported income taxation. He was colonial treasurer in Alfred Kennerley's government from 1873 to 1875. Fysh first became premier in August 1877, but resigned in March 1878 citing ill health. He continued as a minister without portfolio under William Giblin for several months, before taking an extended vacation in England.

In 1884, Fysh attracted attention by convening a public meeting where he announced his support for manhood suffrage, electoral reform and other liberal reforms. He stated that he had been "liberal to the backbone before I left England", but acknowledged that he had become more conservative since arriving in Tasmania and that the positions he announced were "in advance of his former self".

=== Premier of Tasmania, 1887–1892 ===
Fysh returned as premier in March 1887. He appointed himself chief secretary and included Edward Braddon and Andrew Inglis Clark in his ministry, both of whom were social reformers and were later involved in drafting the federal constitution. Although Fysh was unable to secure the passage of manhood suffrage, his government passed liberal legislation allowing for the legalisation of trade unions, payment of members and greater regulation of health, employment and charities. It also legislated for the creation of the University of Tasmania and a technical education scheme. He resigned as premier in August 1892 after the government was defeated on the floor of parliament.

Fysh's government passed the Chinese Immigration Act 1887 which introduced a poll tax as a method of restricting Chinese immigration to Tasmania, in line with similar legislation in other Australian colonies. Fysh favoured comparatively weaker restrictions than other members of his government, including Clark, and cited economic reasons rather than racial barriers as the reason for the act. At the 1888 inter-colonial conference on the "Chinese question" he opposed a motion calling for further restriction of Chinese immigrants and stated that naturalised British subjects of Chinese origin should be allowed to bring their wives into Australia.

In 1890, Fysh supported the transfer of Macquarie Island from Tasmania to New Zealand. This had been requested by the New Zealand government to allow it to police illegal sealing activities, however the House of Assembly voted to reject the transfer against the wishes of Fysh and his cabinet. Fysh regularly corresponded with New Zealand premier Harry Atkinson over Macquarie Island issues including potential actions against New Zealand sealer Joseph Hatch.

== Federal politics ==
Photograph by Swiss Studios

Fysh supported the movement for federation. He was a delegate to the Australasian Federal Convention in 1891 and 1897 and served on the Federal Council of Australasia.

At the inaugural 1901 federal election, Fysh was elected to the House of Representatives as one of five members for the statewide Tasmanian division. He transferred to the newly created single-member seat of Denison at the 1903 election and was re-elected at the 1906 election, retiring at the 1910 election.

On 26 April 1901, Fysh was appointed as a minister without portfolio in the Barton government, replacing Elliott Lewis as the only Tasmanian representative in cabinet. He was appointed Postmaster-General of Australia on 10 August 1903, retaining the position under Barton's successor Alfred Deakin until 27 April 1904 following the government's defeat. According to his entry in the Australian Dictionary of Biography, "during the last years of his political career he was forced into the role of a conservative in response to the growing influence of the Labor Party, whose creed he abhorred".

== Personal life ==
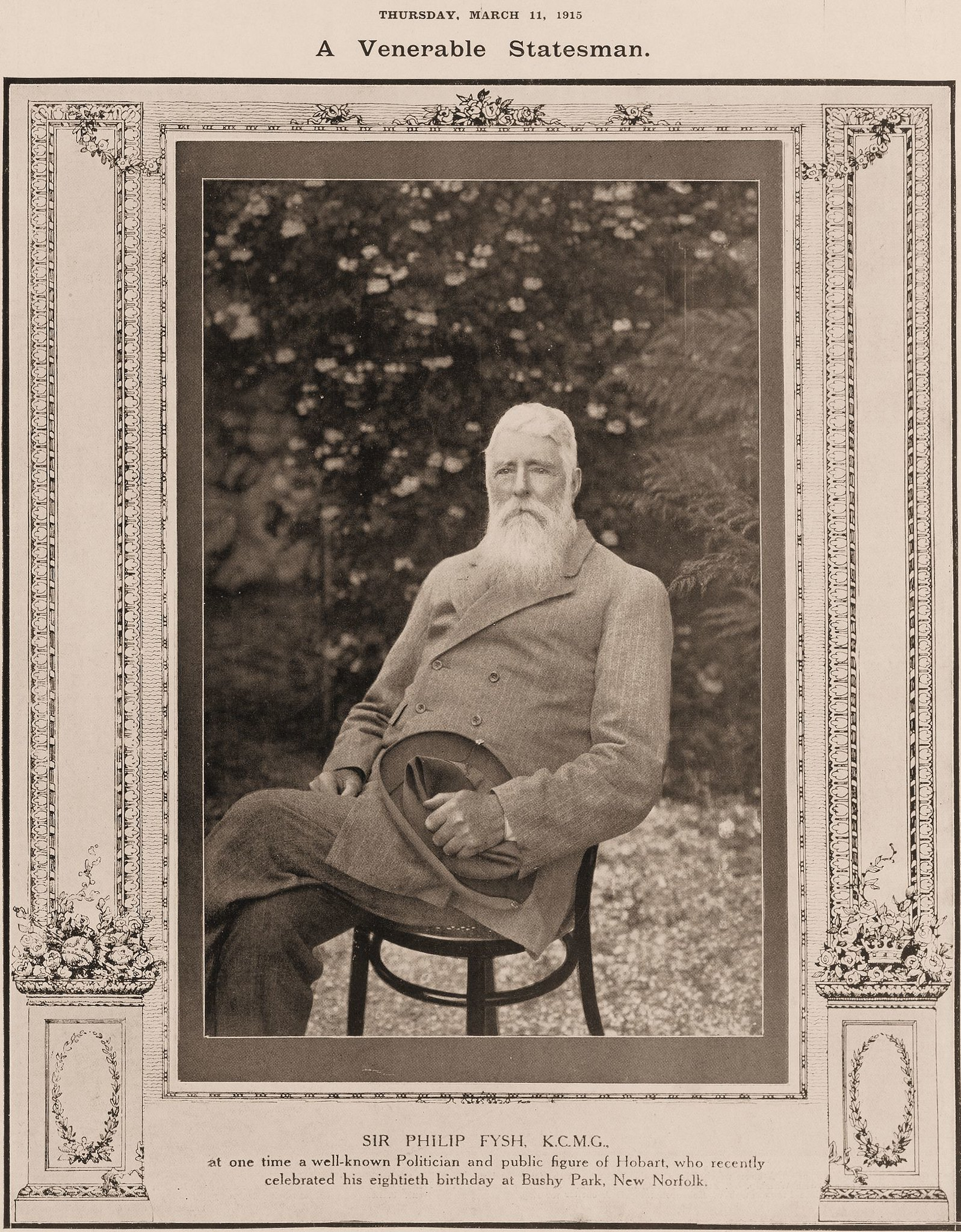
Fysh in 1915

In 1856, Fysh married Esther Kentish Willis, with whom he had five sons and five daughters. He was predeceased by a daughter in 1899 and was widowed in 1912. His brother-in-law William Willis was a British MP, while his great-nephew Hudson Fysh was a founder of Qantas.

Fysh died on 20 December 1919 in Sandy Bay, Tasmania.

Fysh was married under the rites of the Dissenters. In Hobart he was a member of the Davey Street Congregational Church.

== Honours ==
Fysh was created a Knight Commander of the Order of St Michael and St George (KCMG) in January 1896. The Canberra suburb of Fyshwick was named after him.

== See also ==
- Barton Ministry

Political offices
Preceded by Thomas Reibey	Premier of Tasmania; 1877–1878	Succeeded by William Giblin
Preceded by James Agnew	Premier of Tasmania; 1887–1892	Succeeded by Henry Dobson
Preceded by James Drake	Postmaster-General; 1903–1904	Succeeded by Hugh Mahon
Tasmanian Legislative Council
Preceded by John Wedge	Member for Hobart; 1866–1869; Served alongside: Kennerley, Wilson	Succeeded by William Crowther
Preceded by Thomas Lowes	Member for Buckingham; 1870–1873	Succeeded by Thomas Chapman
Preceded by Thomas Chapman	Member for Buckingham; 1884–1894	Succeeded by Frederick Piesse
Parliament of Australia
New division	Member for Tasmania; 1901–1902; Served alongside: Braddon, Cameron, O'Malley, Piesse	Division abolished
New division	Member for Tasmania; 1902–1903; Served alongside: Braddon, Cameron, Hartnoll, O'Malley	Division abolished
New division	Member for Denison; 1903–1910	Succeeded by William Laird Smith
