= Frederick William Piesse =

Australian politician (1848–1902)

Frederick Piesse
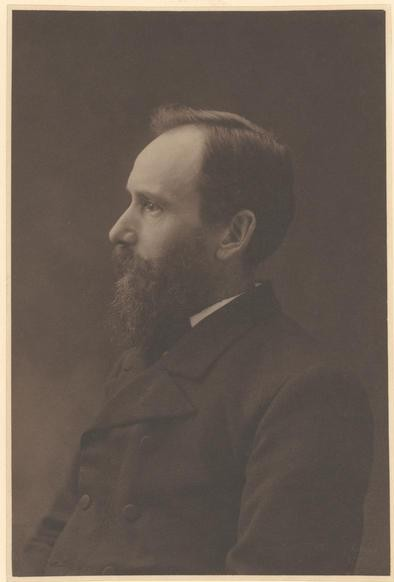

Member of the Australian Parliament for Tasmania
- In office 29 March 1901 – 6 March 1902 Serving with Edward Braddon, Norman Cameron, Philip Fysh, King O'Malley
- Preceded by: New seat
- Succeeded by: William Hartnoll

Personal details
- Born: 10 December 1848 Hobart Town, Van Diemen's Land
- Died: 6 March 1902 (aged 53) New Town, Tasmania, Australia
- Party: Free Trade Party

Frederick William Piesse (10 December 1848 – 6 March 1902) was an Australian politician who was a member of the first Australian federal parliament.

Born in Hobart, Tasmania, Piesse worked in law, conveyancing, shipping and horticulture before being elected to the Tasmanian House of Assembly as the Member for North Hobart in 1893. In April 1894, Piesse resigned from the House of Assembly as part of an arrangement to swap seats with Legislative Council member for Buckingham, Philip Fysh, to enable Fysh to take the role of Treasurer in Edward Braddon's ministry. Piesse served as an Honorary Minister from 1899 to 1901.

Piesse was elected as a Free Trader to the first federal Australian Parliament as one of the five members for Tasmania. His tenure as a federal parliamentarian would be short lived, however, as he died less than a year after his election. He was the first serving Tasmanian Member of the House of Representatives to die.

Piesse died of septic pneumonia at his home in New Town on 6 March 1902, aged 53, having been ill for three months.

Tasmanian Legislative Council
Preceded by Philip Fysh	Member for Buckingham; 1894–1901	Succeeded by Tetley Gant
Parliament of Australia
New division	Member for Tasmania; 1901–1902; Served alongside: Braddon, Cameron, Fysh, O'Malley	Succeeded by William Hartnoll
