= Edward Braddon =

British Indian civil servant and Australian politician (1829–1904)

The Right Honourable Sir Edward Braddon KCMG

18th Premier of Tasmania
- In office 14 April 1894 – 12 October 1899
- Preceded by: Henry Dobson
- Succeeded by: Elliott Lewis

Member of the Australian House of Representatives
- In office 16 December 1903 – 2 February 1904
- Preceded by: New seat
- Succeeded by: Norman Cameron
- Constituency: Wilmot
- In office 29 March 1901 – 16 December 1903
- Preceded by: New seat
- Succeeded by: Seat abolished
- Constituency: Tasmania

Personal details
- Born: 11 June 1829 St. Kew, Cornwall, England
- Died: 2 February 1904 (aged 74) Leith, Tasmania, Australia
- Party: Free Trade Party
- Spouse(s): Mary Palmer (m. 1857; died 1864) Alice Smith (m. 1876)
- Relations: Mary Elizabeth Braddon (sister); Henry Braddon (son)
- Occupation: Civil servant

Sir Edward Nicholas Coventry Braddon KCMG (11 June 1829 – 2 February 1904) was a founding father of Australia. He was premier of Tasmania from 1894 to 1899 and was a delegate to the conventions which drafted the Australian constitution.

Braddon was born in England, the brother of novelist Mary Elizabeth Braddon. He lived in British India from 1847 to 1878, initially employed as a clerk and manager in the indigo industry in Bengal. He served with British forces during the Santhal rebellion and Indian mutiny and subsequently joined the Indian Civil Service. Braddon spent periods as assistant commissioner in Deoghar and superintendent of excise and stamps in Oudh. His position was made redundant in 1876 and he subsequently moved to north-west Tasmania, establishing a farm at Leith.

Braddon was elected to the Tasmanian House of Assembly a year after his arrival in the colony and was appointed as a government minister in 1887. He was Tasmania's agent-general in London from 1888 to 1893. He subsequently returned to parliament and formed a government in 1894. As premier he was credited with improving the colony's finances and public works. Braddon was a strong supporter of the federation movement and served on the Federal Council of Australasia. At the constitutional conventions he secured the inclusion of section 87 – known as the Braddon Clause – which helped secure the approval of Tasmania and other smaller colonies.

After federation, Braddon was elected to the House of Representatives at the 1901 federal election as its oldest member. He died in office in 1904. Both the suburb of Braddon in the Australian Capital Territory and the Division of Braddon in Tasmania are named after him.

== Early life ==
Braddon was born on 11 June 1829 in St. Kew, Cornwall, England. He was the second of three children born to Fanny (née White) and Henry Braddon. His younger sister Mary Elizabeth Braddon became a well-known novelist.

Braddon's father, a member of a "good old Cornish family", had trained as a solicitor but struggled financially. His mother was born to Irish parents from County Limerick and was raised Protestant, although her own mother's family was Catholic. His parents separated around 1840 due to his father's infidelity. Braddon spent his childhood in London, where he attended a preparatory school in Fulham Road and a private school in Greenwich. He may also have taken classes at University College, London.

== Life in India ==
Early photograph of Braddon

In 1847, Braddon moved to British India where he joined his cousin's merchant firm in Calcutta as a clerk. After a few years he moved to Krishnagar where he managed indigo factories for European planters. On one occasion he was convicted of "aggravated and unprovoked assault" by a deputy magistrate, which was reversed on appeal.

Braddon joined British forces during the Santhal rebellion of 1855 and later served under George Udny Yule at Purnea during the Indian Mutiny. He was appointed as the assistant commissioner for Deoghar when Yule became commissioner of the newly created Santal Parganas district in 1857. He was regarded as a successful administrator and in 1862 was moved to Lucknow where he was superintendent of excise and stamps under the Chief Commissioner of Oudh. His office was abolished in 1876 following reforms which created a joint administration for the North-Western Provinces and Oudh.

== Move to Tasmania ==
In March 1878, after being unable to obtain a further position in India, Braddon and his family left for the Australian colony of Tasmania. He was possibly encouraged by the Castra scheme promoted by Colonel Andrew Crawford, which sought to encourage Anglo-Indians to settle in north-west Tasmania.

Braddon purchased a run-down property at Leith which he turned into a successful farm. He continued to correspond with India and wrote a series of articles on his experiences for The Statesman and Friend of India, which were published under the title "A Home in the Colonies". An edited version of the series was published by the Tasmanian Historical Research Association in 1980.

== Political career ==
Braddon c. 1887

=== Tasmanian career ===
In 1879, Braddon was elected to the Tasmanian House of Assembly in the Division of West Devon, and he represented that constituency until November 1888. He became leader of the opposition in 1886 and after the defeat of the James Agnew government, he was asked to form a cabinet. However, he resigned the premiership to Philip Fysh, and instead became Minister for Lands and Works.

In 1888, Braddon represented Tasmania on the Federal Council, the predecessor to the Constitutional Conventions of the 1890s. After leaving parliament in 1888, Braddon was appointed Agent-General for Tasmania in London, a position he held until September 1893. While in London he helped to raise funds to float a number of ventures in Tasmania. These include the Mount Lyell Mining and Railway Company.

After returning to Tasmania, Braddon was again elected the member for West Devon, and again became opposition leader. In April 1894, Braddon became Premier, and held office until 12 October 1899, the longest term of any Premier up to that date. He drew no salary while in office, but a contemporary diarist, J.B. Walker, judged him "an adventurer ... not overburdened with conscience".

In 1895, Braddon published another volume of memoirs, entitled Thirty Years of Shikar.

=== Federal career ===
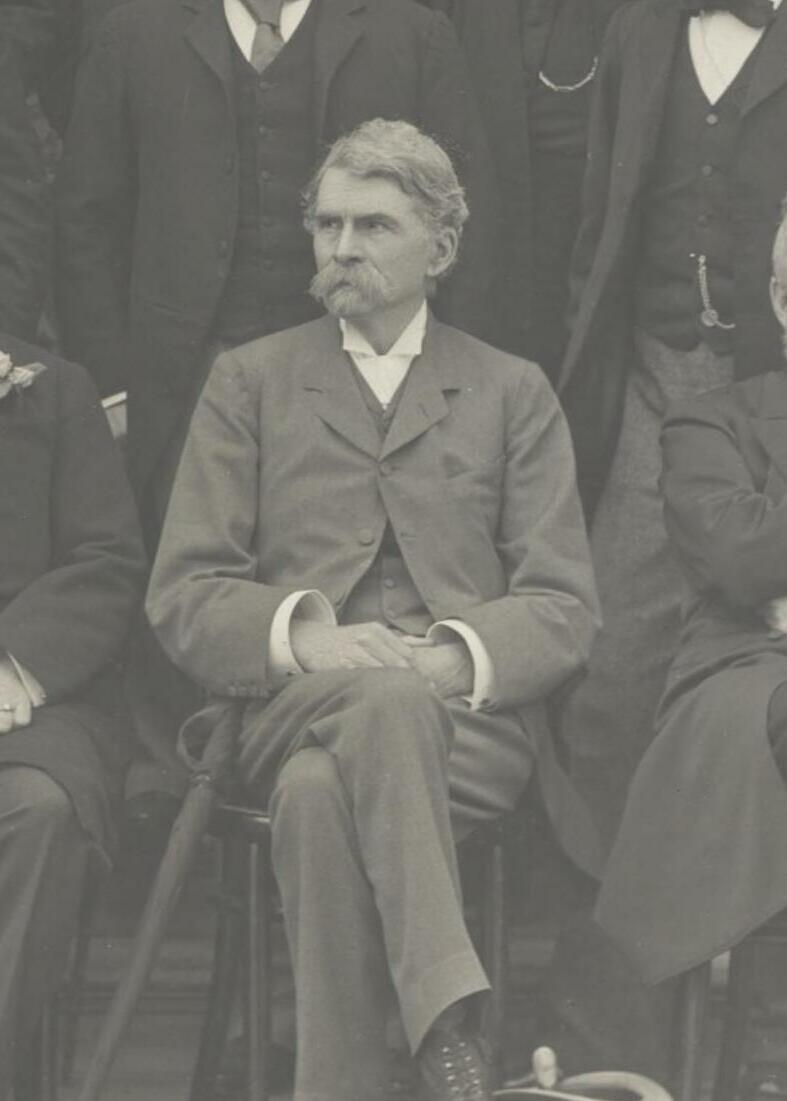
Braddon at the last meeting of the Federal Council of Australasia in 1899

Braddon was an important proponent of federation in Tasmania. He was elected as one of the Tasmanian representatives to the Constitutional Convention of 1897.

At the convention, he was responsible for the so-called "Braddon Clause" (or "Braddon Blot", as it was known by its opponents). The proposed Constitution provided that the Federal Government would assume the power to levy customs duties, an important source of revenue for the states. The Braddon Clause provided that the Commonwealth would have to return at least three-quarters of all duties collected.

After fierce debate, during which George Reid threatened to withdraw New South Wales from the convention, the Clause was limited in operation to ten years after Federation. The now-defunct Clause is still part of the Constitution of Australia as Section 87, however it was superseded by the Surplus Revenue Act 1910.

At the federal election of 1901, Braddon was elected to the first Australian Parliament as one of the five members for Tasmania, which had not yet been divided into electoral divisions. He was not only the oldest member of the House of Representatives, but, at almost 72 years of age, he is still oldest member of the House of Representatives at the time of first election to the house. As a supporter of free trade, he joined with Sir George Reid and became a member of the Free Trade Party, where he would occasionally stand in as Leader of the Opposition when Reid was absent. In the debates over the Commonwealth Franchise Act 1902 he spoke in favour of the disenfranchisement of Aboriginal people. Braddon was re-elected at the federal election of 1903, as the first member of the Division of Wilmot, but he died suddenly at his home in Tasmania in 1904 before the parliament returned from recess.

== Personal life ==
Braddon married twice while living in India. In 1857 he married Amy Palmer, with whom he had two sons and three daughters. He was widowed in 1864 and remarried in 1875 to Alice Smith, with whom he had another daughter. His son Henry Braddon was a diplomat, member of the New South Wales Legislative Council, and rugby union international.

Braddon died on his property at Leith on 2 February 1904, aged 74. He was buried at the Pioneer Cemetery in Forth. A memorial viewing platform, Braddon's Lookout, was opened in 2004 on the centenary of his death.

== Honours ==
In 1891 Braddon was made a Knight Commander of the Order of St Michael and St George. In 1897 he was made a member of the privy council.

The Canberra suburb of Braddon, Australian Capital Territory was named after Sir Edward in 1928. The building housing the federal law courts in Hobart, Tasmania, is named after him.

== See also ==
- Members of the Australian House of Representatives, 1901-1903
- Members of the Australian House of Representatives, 1903-1906

Political offices
Preceded by Henry Dobson	Premier of Tasmania; 1894–1899	Succeeded by Elliot Lewis
Parliament of Australia
New division	Member for Tasmania; 1901–1902; Served alongside: Cameron, Fysh, O'Malley, Piesse	Division abolished
New division	Member for Tasmania; 1902–1903; Served alongside: Cameron, Fysh, Hartnoll, O'Malley	Division abolished
Preceded by Electorate created	Member for Wilmot; 1903–1904	Succeeded by Norman Cameron
