= 1919 Australian Senate election =

- 13 December 1919

19 of the 36 seats in the Senate 19 seats needed for a majority
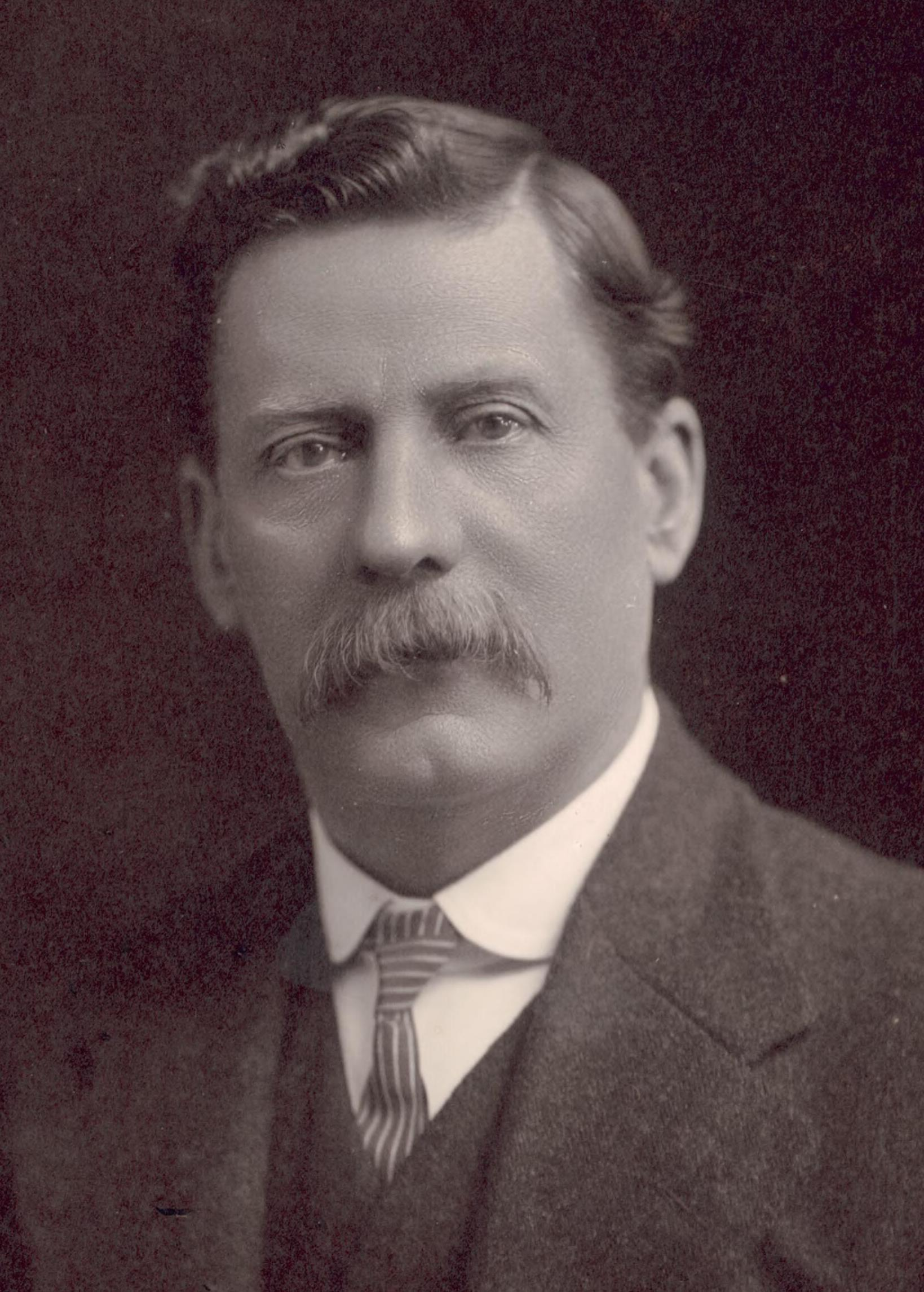

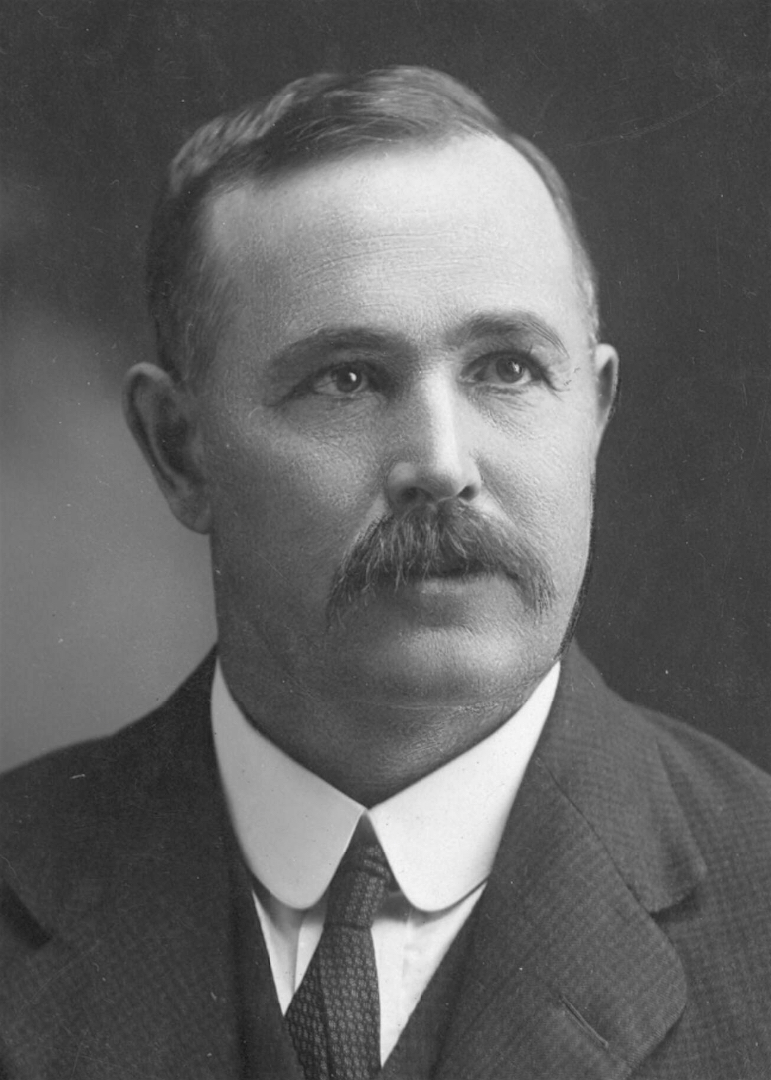
| | First party | Second party |
|---|---|---|
| Leader | Edward Millen | Albert Gardiner |
| Party | Nationalist | Labor |
| Leader's seat | New South Wales | New South Wales |
| Seats before | 24 | 12 |
| Seats won | 18 | 1 |
| Seats after | 35 | 1 |
| Seat change | ▲11 | ▼11 |
| Popular vote | 861,990 | 795,858 |
| Percentage | 46.40% | 42.84 |
| Swing | ▼8.97 | ▼0.88 |

The 1919 Australian Senate election was held on 13 December 1919 to elect 19 of the 36 senators in the Australian Senate as part of the 1919 federal election. Each state elected three senators to serve a six-year term beginning on 1 July 1920, except for Tasmania, who elected an extra senator to fill a casual vacancy.

The election was the first to use preferential block voting following the Commonwealth Electoral Act 1918. The Nationalist Party won 18 of the 19 contested seats to expand their majority in the Senate. This left Albert Gardiner as the only remaining Labor and non-government senator.

== Australia ==
1919 Australian federal election: Senate, National
| Party | Votes | % | ± | Seats | | | |
| Party | Votes | % | ± | Seats won | Not up | New total | Seat change |
|---|---|---|---|---|---|---|---|
| Nationalist | 861,990 | 46.40 | −8.97 | 18 | 17 | 35 | ▲11 |
| Labor | 795,858 | 42.84 | −0.88 | 1 | 0 | 1 | ▼11 |
| Farmers' and Settlers' | 100,620 | 5.42 | +5.42 | 0 | 0 | 0 | Steady |
| Victorian Farmers' Union | 50,620 | 2.72 | +2.72 | 0 | 0 | 0 | Steady |
| Independents | 26,374 | 1.42 | +1.03 | 0 | 0 | 0 | Steady |
| Country Party of Western Australia | 11,853 | 0.64 | +0.64 | 0 | 0 | 0 | Steady |
| Socialist Labor | 10,508 | 0.57 | +0.06 | 0 | 0 | 0 | Steady |
| Total | 1,857,823 | 100.00 | – | 19 | 17 | 36 | – |
| Invalid/blank votes | 175,114 | 8.61 | +4.71 | – | – | – | – |
| Turnout | 2,032,937 | 71.33 | –6.36 | – | – | – | – |
| Registered voters | 2,849,862 | – | – | – | – | – | – |

== New South Wales ==
1919 Australian federal election: Senate, New South Wales
| Party | Candidate | Votes | % | ±% |
|---|---|---|---|---|
| Labor | 1. Albert Gardiner (re-elected 3); 2. Allan McDougall (defeated); 3. John Grant (defeated) | 281,315 | 43.26 | −0.25 |
| Nationalist | 1. Charles Cox (elected 1); 2. Walter Duncan (elected 2); 3. Henry Garling | 242,336 | 37.26 | −17.77 |
| Farmers and Settlers | Franc Falkiner | 100,620 | 15.47 | +15.47 |
| Independent | Alfred Conroy | 15,559 | 2.39 | +2.39 |
| Socialist Labor | 1. Ernie Judd; 2. William Corcoran; 3. Mary McMahon | 10,508 | 1.62 | +0.16 |
| Total formal votes | | 650,338 | 90.63 | −5.54 |
| Informal votes | | 67,227 | 9.37 | +5.54 |
| Turnout | | 717,565 | 66.48 | −4.18 |

| # | Senator | Party |
| 1 | Charles Cox | Nationalist |
| 2 | Walter Duncan | Nationalist |
| 3 | Albert Gardiner | Labor |

== Victoria ==
1919 Australian federal election: Senate, Victoria
| Party | Candidate | Votes | % | ±% |
|---|---|---|---|---|
| Nationalist | 1. Harold Elliott (elected 1); 2. James Guthrie (elected 2); 3. Edward Russell (re-elected 3) | 286,440 | 48.67 | −6.2 |
| Labor | 1. Stephen Barker (defeated); 2. Edward Findley; 3. John Barnes (defeated) | 251,433 | 42.72 | −2.02 |
| Victorian Farmers | 1. Thomas Paterson; 2. Richard Rees; 3. Edwin Reseigh | 50,620 | 8.60 | +8.60 |
| Total formal votes | | 588,493 | 92.23 | −4.56 |
| Informal votes | | 49,605 | 7.77 | +4.56 |
| Turnout | | 638,098 | 76.20 | −7.72 |

| # | Senator | Party |
| 1 | Harold Elliott | Nationalist |
| 2 | James Guthrie | Nationalist |
| 3 | Edward Russell | Nationalist |

== Queensland ==
1919 Australian federal election: Senate, Queensland
| Party | Candidate | Votes | % | ±% |
|---|---|---|---|---|
| Nationalist | 1. John Adamson (elected 1); 2. Thomas Givens (re-elected 2); 3. William Glasgow (elected 3) | 164,844 | 54.27 | +3.36 |
| Labor | 1. Myles Ferricks (defeated); 2. Harry Turley; 3. William Maughan (defeated) | 138,919 | 45.73 | −2.24 |
| Total formal votes | | 303,763 | 91.99 | −3.25 |
| Informal votes | | 26,468 | 8.01 | +3.25 |
| Turnout | | 330,231 | 84.85 | −4.17 |

| # | Senator | Party |
| 1 | John Adamson | Nationalist |
| 2 | Thomas Givens | Nationalist |
| 3 | William Glasgow | Nationalist |

== Western Australia ==
1919 Australian federal election: Senate, Western Australia
| Party | Candidate | Votes | % | ±% |
|---|---|---|---|---|
| Nationalist | 1. George Pearce (re-elected 1); 2. Patrick Lynch (re-elected 2); 3. Edmund Drake-Brockman (elected 3) | 45,012 | 47.93 | −20.23 |
| Labor | 1. Ted Needham (defeated); 2. Thomas Gorman; 3. William Graham | 37,055 | 39.45 | +7.61 |
| Country | 1. James Crawford; 2. Victor Riseley | 11,853 | 12.62 | +12.62 |
| Total formal votes | | 93,920 | 90.98 | −3.86 |
| Informal votes | | 9,315 | 9.02 | +3.86 |
| Turnout | | 103,235 | 63.12 | −14.65 |

| # | Senator | Party |
| 1 | George Pearce | Nationalist |
| 2 | Patrick Lynch | Nationalist |
| 3 | Edmund Drake-Brockman | Nationalist |

== South Australia ==
1919 Australian federal election: Senate, South Australia
| Party | Candidate | Votes | % | ±% |
|---|---|---|---|---|
| Nationalist | 1. Benjamin Benny (elected 1); 2. John Newland (re-elected 2); 3. Victor Wilson (elected 3) | 90,781 | 56.05 | −1.05 |
| Labor | 1. Thomas Grealy; 2. James O'Loghlin (defeated); 3. Frank Lundie | 62,946 | 38.87 | −4.03 |
| Independent | Edward Craigie | 8,230 | 5.08 | +5.08 |
| Total formal votes | | 161,957 | 90.94 | −4.62 |
| Informal votes | | 16,135 | 9.06 | +4.62 |
| Turnout | | 178,092 | 66.39 | −5.54 |

| # | Senator | Party |
| 1 | Benjamin Benny | Nationalist |
| 2 | John Newland | Nationalist |
| 3 | Victor Wilson | Nationalist |

== Tasmania ==
Following the resignation of Labor senator James Long in December 1918, Nationalist Edward Mulcahy was appointed by the Parliament of Tasmania to fill the casual vacancy. As a result, Tasmania elected four senators, with the fourth senator elected sitting the remainder of Long's term ending on 30 June 1920.

1919 Australian federal election: Senate, Tasmania
| Party | Candidate | Votes | % | ±% |
|---|---|---|---|---|
| Nationalist | 1. John Millen (elected 1); 2. George Foster (elected 2); 3. Herbert Payne (elected 3); 4. Edward Mulcahy (elected 4) | 32,577 | 54.89 | −2.07 |
| Labor | 1. David O'Keefe (defeated); 2. James Guy (defeated); 3. Walter Woods | 24,190 | 40.76 | +0.28 |
| Independent | Cyril Cameron | 1,771 | 2.98 | −3.03 |
| Independent | David Blanshard | 814 | 1.37 | +1.37 |
| Total formal votes | | 59,352 | 90.32 | −5.96 |
| Informal votes | | 6,364 | 9.68 | +5.96 |
| Turnout | | 65,716 | 58.66 | −17.35 |

| # | Senator | Party |
| 1 | John Millen | Nationalist |
| 2 | George Foster | Nationalist |
| 3 | Herbert Payne | Nationalist |
| 4 | Edward Mulcahy | Nationalist |

== See also ==
- Candidates of the 1919 Australian federal election
- Results of the 1919 Australian federal election (House of Representatives)
- Members of the Australian Senate, 1920–1923
