= Candidates of the 1919 Australian federal election =

This article provides information on candidates who stood for the 1919 Australian federal election. The election was held on 13 December 1919.

== By-elections, appointments and defections ==
=== By-elections and appointments ===
- On 30 June 1917, William Spence (Nationalist) was elected to succeed Charles Howroyd (Nationalist) as the member for Darwin.
- On 27 October 1917, Edmund Jowett (Nationalist) was elected to succeed Carty Salmon (Nationalist) as the member for Grampians.
- On 11 May 1918, Stanley Bruce (Nationalist) was elected to succeed Sir William Irvine (Nationalist) as the member for Flinders.
- On 26 October 1918, Edwin Corboy (Labor) was elected to succeed Sir John Forrest (Nationalist) as the member for Swan.
- On 14 December 1918, William Gibson (VFU) was elected to succeed Chester Manifold (Nationalist) as the member for Corangamite.
- On 15 January 1919, Edward Mulcahy (Nationalist) was appointed as a Tasmanian Senator to replace James Long (Labor).
- On 20 September 1919, William Hill (VFU) was elected to succeed Albert Palmer (Nationalist) as the member for Echuca.

=== Defections ===
- Labor MP Michael Considine (Barrier) was expelled from the party in 1919 and contested the election as an independent, although he was not opposed by Labor.
- Nationalist MP Bruce Smith (Parkes) lost pre-selection and contested the election as an independent.
- Nationalist MP Jens Jensen (Bass) lost pre-selection and contested the election as an independent.
- Several Nationalist members also received endorsement from the state Country parties. These included William Fleming (Robertson) and John Chanter (Riverina) in New South Wales, Edmund Jowett (Grampians) in Victoria and Henry Gregory (Dampier) in Western Australia.

== Seat changes ==
- The Nationalist member for Hume (NSW), Franc Falkiner, contested the Senate for the Farmers' and Settlers' Association.
- The Nationalist member for Darwin (Tas), William Spence, contested Batman (Vic).
- The Labor member for West Sydney (NSW), Con Wallace, agreed to stand aside in his safe seat to allow Queensland Premier T. J. Ryan to enter federal politics; he contested the Nationalist-held seat of Nepean instead.

== Retiring Members and Senators ==
=== Nationalist ===
- Percy Abbott MP (New England, NSW)
- Willie Kelly MP (Wentworth, NSW)
- Richard Orchard MP (Nepean, NSW)
- Hugh Sinclair MP (Moreton, Qld)
- Senator John Shannon (SA)

== House of Representatives ==
Sitting members at the time of the election are shown in bold text. Successful candidates are highlighted in the relevant colour. Where there is possible confusion, an asterisk (*) is also used.

=== New South Wales ===
| Electorate | Held by | Labor candidate | Nationalist candidate | Other candidates |
|---|---|---|---|---|
| Barrier | Labor | **Michael Considine** | Charles McAllister | Arthur Lawrence (RSSCPA) |
| Calare | Nationalist | Thomas Lavelle | **Henry Pigott** | |
| Cook | Labor | **James Catts** | George Holt | William McCristal (ISLP) |
| Cowper | Nationalist | Ross Pryor | **John Thomson** | Earle Page (FSA) |
| Dalley | Labor | **William Mahony** | Walter Clutton | |
| Darling | Labor | **Arthur Blakeley** | Alfred Perkins | |
| East Sydney | Labor | **John West** | John Willson | |
| Eden-Monaro | Nationalist | Harry Brown | **Austin Chapman** | |
| Gwydir | Nationalist | Lou Cunningham | **William Webster** | James Bell (Ind) |
| Hume | Nationalist | Parker Moloney | Edwin Townsend | Charles Milthorpe (FSA); Andrew Scambler (Ind) |
| Hunter | Labor | **Matthew Charlton** | John Lee | |
| Illawarra | Labor | Bertie Sheiles | **Hector Lamond** | George Burns (ISLP); Thomas Marshall (Ind) |
| Lang | Nationalist | Archibald Moate | **Elliot Johnson** | |
| Macquarie | Labor | **Samuel Nicholls** | Ernest Carr | |
| Nepean | Nationalist | **Con Wallace** | Eric Bowden | |
| New England | Nationalist | James Tully | Alexander Hay | |
| Newcastle | Labor | **David Watkins** | | |
| North Sydney | Nationalist | Cecil Murphy | **Sir Granville Ryrie** | |
| Parkes | Nationalist | Arthur Jones | Charles Marr | **Bruce Smith** (Ind Nat) |
| Parramatta | Nationalist | William Hutchison | **Sir Joseph Cook** | |
| Richmond | Nationalist | Ernest O'Dea | **Walter Massy-Greene** | John Steel (Ind) |
| Riverina | Nationalist | Essell Hoad | **John Chanter** | |
| Robertson | Nationalist | James Kelly | **William Fleming** | |
| South Sydney | Labor | **Edward Riley** | Frederick Sykes | |
| Wentworth | Nationalist | James Dunn | Walter Marks | |
| Werriwa | Nationalist | Bert Lazzarini | **John Lynch** | William Wright (Ind) |
| West Sydney | Labor | Thomas Ryan | Richard Sleath | |

=== Queensland ===
| Electorate | Held by | Labor candidate | Nationalist candidate | Other candidates |
|---|---|---|---|---|
| Brisbane | Labor | **William Finlayson** | Donald Cameron | Sine Boland (Ind) |
| Capricornia | Labor | **William Higgs** | Alexander Cameron | |
| Darling Downs | Nationalist | Phil Alke | **Littleton Groom** | |
| Herbert | Nationalist | Eugene McKenna | **Fred Bamford** | Terence Haren (Ind); Henry Madden (Ind) |
| Kennedy | Labor | **Charles McDonald** | James Suter | |
| Lilley | Nationalist | Joseph Johnston | **George Mackay** | |
| Maranoa | Labor | **Jim Page** | | James Hunter (PPU) |
| Moreton | Nationalist | William Heffernan | Arnold Wienholt | |
| Oxley | Nationalist | James Sharpe | **James Bayley** | |
| Wide Bay | Nationalist | Frederick Martyn | **Edward Corser** | |

=== South Australia ===
| Electorate | Held by | Labor candidate | Nationalist candidate | Other candidates |
|---|---|---|---|---|
| Adelaide | Labor | **George Edwin Yates** | Reginald Blundell | |
| Angas | Nationalist | Moses Gabb | **Paddy Glynn** | |
| Barker | Nationalist | Albert Davies | **John Livingston** | Alexander Williams (Ind) |
| Boothby | Nationalist | Stanley Whitford | **William Story** | George Illingworth (Ind) |
| Grey | Nationalist | Charles Gray | **Alexander Poynton** | |
| Hindmarsh | Nationalist | Norman Makin | **William Archibald** | |
| Wakefield | Nationalist | Edward Stokes | **Richard Foster** | Herbert Tuck (FSA) |

=== Tasmania ===
| Electorate | Held by | Labor candidate | Nationalist candidate | Other candidates |
|---|---|---|---|---|
| Bass | Nationalist | Alfred Higgins | Syd Jackson*; Stephen Margetts | Luke Bryant (Ind); Timothy Earley (Ind); **Jens Jensen** (Ind Nat) |
| Darwin | Nationalist | Joseph Lyons | George Bell | |
| Denison | Nationalist | King O'Malley | **William Laird Smith** | |
| Franklin | Nationalist | | **William McWilliams***; Louis Shoobridge | |
| Wilmot | Nationalist | | **Llewellyn Atkinson***; Henry McFie | Norman Cameron (FSA) |

=== Victoria ===
| Electorate | Held by | Labor candidate | Nationalist candidate | VFU candidate | Other candidates |
|---|---|---|---|---|---|
| Balaclava | Nationalist | Percy Smith | **William Watt** | | Norman Worrall (RSC) |
| Ballaarat | Labor | **Charles McGrath** | Edwin Kerby | | |
| Batman | Labor | **Frank Brennan** | **William Spence** | | |
| Bendigo | Nationalist | Alfred Hampson | **Billy Hughes** | | |
| Bourke | Labor | **Frank Anstey** | Reginald Tracey | | |
| Corangamite | VFU | Edward Malone | Allan McDonald | **William Gibson** | |
| Corio | Nationalist | Alfred Ozanne | **John Lister** | Arthur Walter | Anwoth Brown (Ind Nat) |
| Echuca | VFU | Edward Russell | James Stewart | **William Hill** | |
| Fawkner | Nationalist | Joseph Hannan | **George Maxwell** | | |
| Flinders | Nationalist | Frederick Riley | **Stanley Bruce** | William Burrage | |
| Gippsland | Nationalist | | **George Wise** | Erland Erlandson | |
| Grampians | Nationalist | Mark Lazarus | | **Edmund Jowett** | |
| Henty | Nationalist | Norman Grant | **James Boyd** | | Frederick Francis* (Ind Nat); Edwin Purbrick (Ind Nat) |
| Indi | Nationalist | Joseph Hanigan | **John Leckie** | Robert Cook | |
| Kooyong | Nationalist | Mary Grant | **Sir Robert Best** | | Stephen Thompson (Ind Nat) |
| Maribyrnong | Labor | **James Fenton** | Arthur Thompson | | |
| Melbourne | Labor | **William Maloney** | Ernest Nicholls | | |
| Melbourne Ports | Labor | **James Mathews** | | | |
| Wannon | Nationalist | John Collins | **Arthur Rodgers** | | |
| Wimmera | Nationalist | | **Sydney Sampson** | Percy Stewart | |
| Yarra | Labor | **Frank Tudor** | Andrew Davidson | | |

=== Western Australia ===
| Electorate | Held by | Labor candidate | Nationalist candidate | Other candidates |
|---|---|---|---|---|
| Dampier | Nationalist | Thomas Lowry | **Henry Gregory** | |
| Fremantle | Nationalist | Andrew Clementson | **Reginald Burchell** | |
| Kalgoorlie | Nationalist | Hugh Mahon | **Edward Heitmann** | |
| Perth | Nationalist | John Curtin | Lionel Carter; **James Fowler*** | Gerald Hartrey (Ind FT) |
| Swan | Labor | **Edwin Corboy** | William Hedges | John Prowse (FSA) |

== Senate ==
Sitting Senators are shown in bold text. Tickets that elected at least one Senator are highlighted in the relevant colour. Successful candidates are identified by an asterisk (*).

=== New South Wales ===
Three seats were up for election. The Labor Party was defending three seats. Nationalist Senators Edward Millen, Herbert Pratten and Josiah Thomas were not up for re-election.

| Labor candidates | Nationalist candidates | F&SA candidates | Socialist candidates | Independent candidates |
|---|---|---|---|---|
| **Albert Gardiner***; **John Grant**; **Allan McDougall** | Charles Cox*; Walter Duncan*; Henry Garling | Franc Falkiner | William Corcoran; Ernie Judd; Mary McMahon | Alfred Conroy |

=== Queensland ===
Three seats were up for election. The Labor Party was defending three seats. Nationalist Senators Thomas Crawford, Harry Foll and Matthew Reid were not up for re-election.

| Labor candidates | Nationalist candidates |
|---|---|
| **Myles Ferricks**; **William Maughan**; Harry Turley | John Adamson*; **Thomas Givens***; Sir William Glasgow* |

=== South Australia ===
Three seats were up for election. The Labor Party was defending two seats. The Nationalist Party was defending one seat. Nationalist Senators Robert Guthrie, James Rowell and William Senior were not up for re-election.

| Labor candidates | Nationalist candidates | Other candidates |
|---|---|---|
| Thomas Grealy; Frank Lundie; **James O'Loghlin** | Benjamin Benny*; **John Newland***; Victor Wilson* | Edward Craigie (Ind Dem) |

=== Tasmania ===
Four seats were up for election. Uniquely, one of these was for a vacancy extending only until the new Senate assumed its place on 1 July 1920; this was the remainder of James Long's term that had been filled in the interim by Edward Mulcahy. The fourth elected senator would thus serve only until 1 July 1920, whereupon his term would expire. The Labor Party was defending three seats. The Nationalist Party was defending one seat. Nationalist Senators Thomas Bakhap, John Earle and John Keating were not up for re-election.

| Labor candidates | Nationalist candidates | Other candidates |
|---|---|---|
| **James Guy**; **David O'Keefe**; Walter Woods | George Foster*; Arthur Loone; John Millen*; **Edward Mulcahy***; Herbert Payne* | David Blanshard (Ind); Cyril Cameron (Ind Nat) |

=== Victoria ===
Three seats were up for election. The Labor Party was defending three seats. Nationalist Senators William Bolton, George Fairbairn and William Plain were not up for re-election.

| Labor candidates | Nationalist candidates | VFU candidates |
|---|---|---|
| **Stephen Barker**; **John Barnes**; Edward Findley | Harold Elliott*; James Guthrie*; **Edward Russell*** | Thomas Paterson; Richard Rees; Edwin Reseigh |

=== Western Australia ===
Three seats were up for election. The Labor Party was defending three seats. Nationalist Senators Richard Buzacott, Hugh de Largie and George Henderson were not up for re-election.

| Labor candidates | Nationalist candidates | F&SA candidates |
|---|---|---|
| Thomas Gorman; William Graham; **Ted Needham** | Edmund Drake-Brockman*; **Patrick Lynch***; **George Pearce*** | James Crawford; Victor Riseley |

== See also ==
- 1919 Australian federal election
- Members of the Australian House of Representatives, 1917–1919
- Members of the Australian House of Representatives, 1919–1922
- Members of the Australian Senate, 1917–1920
- Members of the Australian Senate, 1920–1923
- List of political parties in Australia
