= 1919 Australian House of Representatives election =

Australian federal election, 13 December 1919 House of Representatives << 1917–1922 >>
Enrolled voters	2,849,862				
Votes cast	1,977,843		Turnout	71.59	–6.71
Informal votes	68,612		Informal	2.64	+0.32
Summary of votes by party
Party	Primary votes	%	Swing	Seats	Change
Nationalist	870,959	45.62%	–8.60%	37	– 16
Labor	811,244	42.49%	–1.45%	26	+ 4
Country	166,444	8.72%	*	11	+ 11
Ind. Socialist Labor	3,637	0.19%	+0.19%	0	± 0
Independent	56,947	2.98%	+1.13%	2	+ 2
Total	1,909,231			75	

This is a list of electoral division results for the Australian 1919 federal election.

== New South Wales ==
=== Barrier ===
1919 Australian federal election: Barrier
Party	Candidate	Votes	%	±%
Labor	Michael Considine	8,786	51.7	+1.8
Returned Soldiers	Arthur Lawrence	4,735	27.9	+27.9
Nationalist	Charles McAllister	3,476	20.5	+15.3
Total formal votes		16,997	96.4	
Informal votes		637	3.6	
Turnout		17,634	65.7	
Two-party-preferred result
Labor	Michael Considine		53.8	+53.8
Returned Soldiers	Arthur Lawrence		46.2	+46.2
Labor hold		Swing	+53.8	

=== Calare ===
1919 Australian federal election: Calare
Party	Candidate	Votes	%	±%
Labor	Thomas Lavelle	12,628	52.3	+4.1
Nationalist	Henry Pigott	11,526	47.7	−4.1
Total formal votes		24,154	98.6	
Informal votes		340	1.4	
Turnout		24,494	75.0	
Labor gain from Nationalist		Swing	+4.1	

=== Cook ===
1919 Australian federal election: Cook
Party	Candidate	Votes	%	±%
Labor	James Catts	14,559	62.3	−2.1
Nationalist	George Holt	7,248	31.0	−4.6
Ind. Socialist Labor	William McCristal	1,562	6.7	+6.7
Total formal votes		23,369	90.2	
Informal votes		2,540	9.8	
Turnout		25,909	66.1	
Two-party-preferred result
Labor	James Catts		65.7	+1.3
Nationalist	George Holt		34.3	−1.3
Labor hold		Swing	+1.3	

=== Cowper ===
1919 Australian federal election: Cowper
Party	Candidate	Votes	%	±%
Farmers and Settlers	Earle Page	11,372	52.4	+52.4
Labor	Ross Pryor	5,712	26.3	+26.3
Nationalist	John Thomson	4,524	21.3	−78.7
Total formal votes		21,708	94.8	
Informal votes		1,197	5.2	
Turnout		22,905	65.0	
Two-party-preferred result
Farmers and Settlers	Earle Page		71.6	+71.6
Labor	Ross Pryor		28.4	+28.4
Farmers and Settlers gain from Nationalist		Swing	+71.6	

=== Dalley ===
1919 Australian federal election: Dalley
Party	Candidate	Votes	%	±%
Labor	William Mahony	16,242	59.7	+5.7
Nationalist	Walter Clutton	10,956	40.3	−5.7
Total formal votes		27,198	97.6	
Informal votes		657	2.4	
Turnout		27,855	69.1	
Labor hold		Swing	+5.7	

=== Darling ===
1919 Australian federal election: Darling
Party	Candidate	Votes	%	±%
Labor	Arthur Blakeley	11,344	61.8	+8.5
Nationalist	Alfred Perkins	7,004	38.2	−8.5
Total formal votes		18,348	97.8	
Informal votes		417	2.2	
Turnout		18,765	67.8	
Labor hold		Swing	+8.5	

=== East Sydney ===
1919 Australian federal election: East Sydney
Party	Candidate	Votes	%	±%
Labor	John West	12,751	57.8	−42.2
Nationalist	John Willson	9,327	42.2	+42.2
Total formal votes		22,078	97.3	
Informal votes		617	2.7	
Turnout		22,695	58.1	
Labor hold		Swing	−42.2	

=== Eden-Monaro ===
1919 Australian federal election: Eden-Monaro
Party	Candidate	Votes	%	±%
Nationalist	Austin Chapman	10,253	51.2	−6.0
Labor	Harry Brown	9,770	48.8	+6.0
Total formal votes		20,023	98.4	
Informal votes		330	1.6	
Turnout		20,353	69.8	
Nationalist hold		Swing	−6.0	

=== Gwydir ===
1919 Australian federal election: Gwydir
Party	Candidate	Votes	%	±%
Labor	Lou Cunningham	10,333	49.1	+5.6
Nationalist	William Webster	8,699	41.4	−15.1
Independent	James Bell	1,992	9.5	+9.5
Total formal votes		21,024	93.4	
Informal votes		1,477	6.6	
Turnout		22,501	69.4	
Two-party-preferred result
Labor	Lou Cunningham	11,183	53.2	+9.7
Nationalist	William Webster	9,841	46.8	−9.7
Labor gain from Nationalist		Swing	+9.7	

=== Hume ===
1919 Australian federal election: Hume
Party	Candidate	Votes	%	±%
Labor	Parker Moloney	11,702	52.6	+4.5
Nationalist	Edwin Townsend	5,288	23.8	−28.1
Farmers and Settlers	Charles Milthorpe	5,149	23.1	+23.1
Independent	Andrew Scambler	125	0.6	+0.6
Total formal votes		22,264	92.8	
Informal votes		1,735	7.2	
Turnout		23,999	70.7	
Two-party-preferred result
Labor	Parker Moloney		57.5	+9.4
Nationalist	Edwin Townsend		42.5	−9.4
Labor gain from Nationalist		Swing	+9.4	

=== Hunter ===
1919 Australian federal election: Hunter
Party	Candidate	Votes	%	±%
Labor	Matthew Charlton	13,692	58.9	+5.5
Nationalist	John Lee	9,558	41.1	−5.5
Total formal votes		23,250	98.0	
Informal votes		485	2.0	
Turnout		23,735	60.9	
Labor hold		Swing	+5.5	

=== Illawarra ===
1919 Australian federal election: Illawarra
Party	Candidate	Votes	%	±%
Nationalist	Hector Lamond	15,419	50.6	−3.7
Labor	Bertie Sheiles	12,520	41.1	−4.6
Ind. Socialist Labor	George Burns	2,075	6.8	+6.8
Independent	Thomas Marshall	446	1.5	+1.5
Total formal votes		30,460	90.8	
Informal votes		4,080	9.2	
Turnout		33,540	71.8	
Two-party-preferred result
Nationalist	Hector Lamond		53.1	−1.2
Labor	Bertie Sheiles		46.9	+1.2
Nationalist hold		Swing	−1.2	

=== Lang ===
1919 Australian federal election: Lang
Party	Candidate	Votes	%	±%
Nationalist	Elliot Johnson	18,939	57.3	−3.1
Labor	Archibald Moate	14,105	42.7	+3.1
Total formal votes		33,044	98.5	
Informal votes		515	1.5	
Turnout		33,559	67.6	
Nationalist hold		Swing	−3.1	

=== Macquarie ===
1919 Australian federal election: Macquarie
Party	Candidate	Votes	%	±%
Labor	Samuel Nicholls	13,455	53.2	+3.2
Nationalist	Ernest Carr	11,859	46.8	−3.2
Total formal votes		25,314	98.4	
Informal votes		407	1.6	
Turnout		25,721	73.3	
Labor hold		Swing	+3.2	

=== Nepean ===
1919 Australian federal election: Nepean
Party	Candidate	Votes	%	±%
Nationalist	Eric Bowden	20,630	57.1	−3.4
Labor	Con Wallace	15,524	42.9	+3.4
Total formal votes		36,154	97.8	
Informal votes		814	2.2	
Turnout		36,968	68.6	
Nationalist hold		Swing	−3.4	

=== New England ===
1919 Australian federal election: New England
Party	Candidate	Votes	%	±%
Nationalist	Alexander Hay	12,622	57.3	−42.7
Labor	James Tully	9,390	42.7	+42.7
Total formal votes		22,012	98.0	
Informal votes		442	2.0	
Turnout		22,454	69.7	
Nationalist hold		Swing	−42.7	

=== Newcastle ===
1919 Australian federal election: Newcastle
Party	Candidate	Votes	%	±%
Labor	David Watkins	unopposed		
Labor hold		Swing		

=== North Sydney ===
1919 Australian federal election: North Sydney
Party	Candidate	Votes	%	±%
Nationalist	Sir Granville Ryrie	26,438	75.5	−24.5
Labor	Cecil Murphy	8,558	24.5	+24.5
Total formal votes		34,996	98.2	
Informal votes		643	1.8	
Turnout		35,639	66.9	
Nationalist hold		Swing	−24.5	

=== Parkes ===
1919 Australian federal election: Parkes
Party	Candidate	Votes	%	±%
Nationalist	Charles Marr	18,276	45.6	−19.8
Labor	Arthur Jones	13,807	34.4	−0.2
Ind. Nationalist	Bruce Smith	8,032	20.0	+20.0
Total formal votes		40,115	92.1	
Informal votes		3,437	7.9	
Turnout		43,552	66.0	
Two-party-preferred result
Nationalist	Charles Marr	25,512	63.6	−1.8
Labor	Arthur Jones	14,603	36.4	+1.8
Nationalist hold		Swing	−1.8	

=== Parramatta ===
1919 Australian federal election: Parramatta
Party	Candidate	Votes	%	±%
Nationalist	Sir Joseph Cook	27,000	72.6	−1.2
Labor	William Hutchinson	10,205	27.4	+27.4
Total formal votes		37,205	98.6	
Informal votes		536	1.4	
Turnout		37,741	66.2	
Nationalist hold		Swing	−1.2	

=== Richmond ===
1919 Australian federal election: Richmond
Party	Candidate	Votes	%	±%
Nationalist	Walter Massy-Greene	14,215	66.9	−8.3
Labor	Ernest O'Dea	4,650	21.9	−2.9
Independent	John Steel	2,384	11.2	+11.2
Total formal votes		21,249	93.8	
Informal votes		1,412	6.2	
Turnout		22,661	66.7	
Two-party-preferred result
Nationalist	Walter Massy-Greene		72.5	−2.7
Labor	Ernest O'Dea		27.5	+2.7
Nationalist hold		Swing	−2.7	

=== Riverina ===
1919 Australian federal election: Riverina
Party	Candidate	Votes	%	±%
Nationalist	John Chanter	11,114	51.3	−7.9
Labor	Essell Hoad	10,530	48.7	+7.9
Total formal votes		21,644	97.8	
Informal votes		480	2.2	
Turnout		22,124	63.8	
Nationalist hold		Swing	−7.9	

=== Robertson ===
1919 Australian federal election: Robertson
Party	Candidate	Votes	%	±%
Nationalist	William Fleming	11,468	53.5	−2.7
Labor	James Kelly	9,987	46.5	+2.7
Total formal votes		21,455	98.3	
Informal votes		367	1.7	
Turnout		21,822	65.7	
Nationalist hold		Swing	−2.7	

=== South Sydney ===
1919 Australian federal election: South Sydney
Party	Candidate	Votes	%	±%
Labor	Edward Riley	17,521	68.3	+5.0
Nationalist	Frederick Sykes	8,123	31.7	−5.0
Total formal votes		25,644	97.9	
Informal votes		559	2.1	
Turnout		26,203	59.9	
Labor hold		Swing	+5.0	

=== Wentworth ===
1919 Australian federal election: Wentworth
Party	Candidate	Votes	%	±%
Nationalist	Walter Marks	20,768	61.5	−7.0
Labor	James Dunn	12,998	38.5	+7.0
Total formal votes		33,766	98.3	
Informal votes		595	1.7	
Turnout		34,361	63.9	
Nationalist hold		Swing	−7.0	

=== Werriwa ===
1919 Australian federal election: Werriwa
Party	Candidate	Votes	%	±%
Labor	Bert Lazzarini	11,948	49.6	+2.4
Nationalist	John Lynch	7,600	31.6	−21.2
Independent	William Wright	4,536	18.8	+18.8
Total formal votes		24,084	92.1	
Informal votes		2,063	7.9	
Turnout		26,147	71.6	
Two-party-preferred result
Labor	Bert Lazzarini	12,275	51.0	+3.8
Nationalist	John Lynch	11,809	49.0	−3.8
Labor gain from Nationalist		Swing	+3.8	

=== West Sydney ===
1919 Australian federal election: West Sydney
Party	Candidate	Votes	%	±%
Labor	Thomas Ryan	14,234	72.2	+5.7
Nationalist	Richard Sleath	5,488	27.8	−5.7
Total formal votes		19,722	96.4	
Informal votes		738	3.6	
Turnout		20,460	66.7	
Labor hold		Swing	+5.7	

== Victoria ==
=== Balaclava ===
1919 Australian federal election: Balaclava
Party	Candidate	Votes	%	±%
Nationalist	William Watt	19,051	58.2	−8.4
Labor	Percy Smith	9,311	28.4	−5.0
Returned Services	Norman Worrall	4,388	13.4	+13.4
Total formal votes		32,750	95.7	
Informal votes		1,457	4.3	
Turnout		34,207	73.4	
Two-party-preferred result
Nationalist	William Watt		64.9	−1.7
Labor	Percy Smith		35.1	+1.7
Nationalist hold		Swing	−1.7	

=== Ballaarat ===
1919 Australian federal election: Ballaarat
Party	Candidate	Votes	%	±%
Nationalist	Edwin Kerby	13,569	50.0	+50.0
Labor	Charles McGrath	13,568	50.0	−50.0
Total formal votes		27,137	99.3	
Informal votes		202	0.7	
Turnout		27,339	82.5	
Nationalist gain from Labor		Swing	+50.0	

- This result was declared void and a by-election was held in the following year.

1920 Ballaarat by-election
Party	Candidate	Votes	%	±%
Labor	Charles McGrath	15,058	51.7	+1.7
Nationalist	Edwin Kerby	11,443	39.3	−10.7
Farmers	John Troup	2,413	8.3	+8.3
Independent	Edward Callow	186	0.6	+0.6
Total formal votes		29,100	99.3	
Informal votes		214	0.7	
Turnout		29,314	76.7	
Two-party-preferred result
Labor	Charles McGrath		56.1	+6.1
Nationalist	Edwin Kerby		45.9	−6.1
Labor gain from Nationalist		Swing	+6.1	

=== Batman ===
1919 Australian federal election: Batman
Party	Candidate	Votes	%	±%
Labor	Frank Brennan	16,039	57.1	−3.8
Nationalist	William Spence	12,064	42.9	+3.8
Total formal votes		28,103	98.4	
Informal votes		466	1.6	
Turnout		28,569	76.8	
Labor hold		Swing	−3.8	

=== Bendigo ===
1919 Australian federal election: Bendigo
Party	Candidate	Votes	%	±%
Nationalist	Billy Hughes	14,291	55.0	−2.4
Labor	Alfred Hampson	11,676	45.0	+2.4
Total formal votes		25,967	99.3	
Informal votes		186	0.7	
Turnout		26,153	82.8	
Nationalist hold		Swing	−2.4	

=== Bourke ===
1919 Australian federal election: Bourke
Party	Candidate	Votes	%	±%
Labor	Frank Anstey	21,359	53.2	−1.3
Nationalist	Reginald Tracey	18,814	46.8	+1.3
Total formal votes		40,173	99.0	
Informal votes		390	1.0	
Turnout		40,563	76.0	
Labor hold		Swing	−1.3	

=== Corangamite ===
1919 Australian federal election: Corangamite
Party	Candidate	Votes	%	±%
Labor	Edward Malone	10,280	37.4	−2.2
Victorian Farmers	William Gibson	8,632	31.4	+31.4
Nationalist	Allan McDonald	8,563	31.2	−29.2
Total formal votes		27,475	96.6	
Informal votes		969	3.4	
Turnout		28,444	80.3	
Two-party-preferred result
Victorian Farmers	William Gibson	16,864	61.4	+61.4
Labor	Edward Malone	10,611	38.6	−1.0
Victorian Farmers hold		Swing	+1.0	

=== Corio ===
1919 Australian federal election: Corio
Party	Candidate	Votes	%	±%
Nationalist	John Lister	13,702	45.3	−12.0
Labor	Alfred Ozanne	11,658	38.5	−4.2
Victorian Farmers	Arthur Walter	4,623	15.3	+15.3
Ind. Nationalist	Anwoth Brown	282	0.9	+0.9
Total formal votes		30,265	96.6	
Informal votes		1,056	3.4	
Turnout		31,321	80.6	
Two-party-preferred result
Nationalist	John Lister	17,406	57.5	+0.2
Labor	Alfred Ozanne	12,859	42.5	−0.2
Nationalist hold		Swing	+0.2	

=== Echuca ===
1919 Australian federal election: Echuca
Party	Candidate	Votes	%	±%
Victorian Farmers	William Hill	11,411	43.3	+43.3
Nationalist	James Stewart	8,734	33.1	−27.6
Labor	Edward Russell	6,218	23.6	−15.7
Total formal votes		26,363	96.9	
Informal votes		852	3.1	
Turnout		27,215	76.9	
Two-party-preferred result
Victorian Farmers	William Hill	16,878	64.0	+64.0
Nationalist	James Stewart	9,485	36.0	−24.7
Victorian Farmers hold		Swing	+24.7	

=== Fawkner ===
1919 Australian federal election: Fawkner
Party	Candidate	Votes	%	±%
Nationalist	George Maxwell	15,819	51.5	+0.4
Labor	Joseph Hannan	14,927	48.5	+0.2
Total formal votes		30,746	99.2	
Informal votes		251	0.8	
Turnout		30,997	77.1	
Nationalist hold		Swing	+0.1	

=== Flinders ===
1919 Australian federal election: Flinders
Party	Candidate	Votes	%	±%
Nationalist	Stanley Bruce	12,968	48.0	−13.2
Labor	Frederick Riley	7,926	29.3	−9.5
Victorian Farmers	William Burrage	6,126	22.7	+22.7
Total formal votes		27,020	94.0	
Informal votes		1,713	6.0	
Turnout		28,733	70.1	
Two-party-preferred result
Nationalist	Stanley Bruce	17,693	65.5	+4.3
Labor	Frederick Riley	9,327	34.5	−4.3
Nationalist hold		Swing	+4.3	

=== Gippsland ===
1919 Australian federal election: Gippsland
Party	Candidate	Votes	%	±%
Nationalist	George Wise	14,367	55.2	−17.5
Victorian Farmers	Erland Erlandson	11,675	44.8	+44.8
Total formal votes		26,042	98.7	
Informal votes		344	1.3	
Turnout		26,386	73.5	
Nationalist hold		Swing	−17.5	

=== Grampians ===
1919 Australian federal election: Grampians
Party	Candidate	Votes	%	±%
Victorian Farmers	Edmund Jowett	13,736	58.2	+58.2
Labor	Mark Lazarus	9,855	41.8	−1.2
Total formal votes		23,591	98.6	
Informal votes		343	1.4	
Turnout		23,934	78.2	
Victorian Farmers gain from Nationalist		Swing	+1.2	

=== Henty ===
1919 Australian federal election: Henty
Party	Candidate	Votes	%	±%
Nationalist	James Boyd	17,293	40.8	−29.8
Ind. Nationalist	Frederick Francis	12,382	29.2	+29.2
Labor	Norman Grant	9,582	22.6	−6.8
Ind. Nationalist	Edwin Purbrick	3,097	7.3	+7.3
Total formal votes		42,354	95.8	
Informal votes		1,864	4.2	
Turnout		44,218	74.7	
Two-party-preferred result
Independent	Frederick Francis	22,396	52.9	+52.9
Nationalist	James Boyd	19,958	47.1	−23.2
Independent gain from Nationalist		Swing	+23.2	

=== Indi ===
1919 Australian federal election: Indi
Party	Candidate	Votes	%	±%
Labor	Joseph Hanigan	8,668	36.4	−7.4
Victorian Farmers	Robert Cook	7,673	32.2	+32.2
Nationalist	John Leckie	7,492	31.4	−24.8
Total formal votes		23,833	96.4	
Informal votes		889	3.6	
Turnout		24,722	78.0	
Two-party-preferred result
Victorian Farmers	Robert Cook	14,922	62.6	+62.6
Labor	Joseph Hanigan	8,911	37.4	−6.4
Victorian Farmers gain from Nationalist		Swing	+6.4	

=== Kooyong ===
1919 Australian federal election: Kooyong
Party	Candidate	Votes	%	±%
Nationalist	Sir Robert Best	22,732	62.5	−37.5
Ind. Nationalist	Stephen Thompson	7,025	19.3	+19.3
Labor	Mary Grant	6,589	18.1	+18.1
Total formal votes		36,346	96.5	
Informal votes		1,331	3.5	
Turnout		37,677	76.6	
Two-party-preferred result
Nationalist	Sir Robert Best		64.3	−35.7
Ind. Nationalist	Stephen Thompson		35.7	+35.7
Nationalist hold		Swing	−35.7	

=== Maribyrnong ===
1919 Australian federal election: Maribyrnong
Party	Candidate	Votes	%	±%
Labor	James Fenton	20,165	52.1	−0.1
Nationalist	Arthur Thompson	18,509	47.9	+0.1
Total formal votes		38,674	98.8	
Informal votes		467	1.2	
Turnout		39,141	78.2	
Labor hold		Swing	−0.1	

=== Melbourne ===
1919 Australian federal election: Melbourne
Party	Candidate	Votes	%	±%
Labor	William Maloney	15,179	65.6	+5.3
Nationalist	Ernest Nicholls	7,949	34.4	−5.3
Total formal votes		23,128	98.1	
Informal votes		458	1.9	
Turnout		23,586	71.5	
Labor hold		Swing	+5.3	

=== Melbourne Ports ===
1919 Australian federal election: Melbourne Ports
Party	Candidate	Votes	%	±%
Labor	James Mathews	unopposed		
Labor hold		Swing		

=== Wannon ===
1919 Australian federal election: Wannon
Party	Candidate	Votes	%	±%
Nationalist	Arthur Rodgers	14,806	54.1	−0.7
Labor	John Collins	12,577	45.9	+0.7
Total formal votes		27,383	99.1	
Informal votes		261	0.9	
Turnout		27,644	79.3	
Nationalist hold		Swing	−0.7	

=== Wimmera ===
1919 Australian federal election: Wimmera
Party	Candidate	Votes	%	±%
Victorian Farmers	Percy Stewart	15,963	59.5	+59.5
Nationalist	Sydney Sampson	10,875	40.5	−59.5
Total formal votes		26,838	98.3	
Informal votes		476	1.7	
Turnout		27,314	73.0	
Victorian Farmers gain from Nationalist		Swing	+59.5	

=== Yarra ===
1919 Australian federal election: Yarra
Party	Candidate	Votes	%	±%
Labor	Frank Tudor	19,843	70.3	−1.0
Nationalist	Andrew Davidson	8,398	29.7	+1.0
Total formal votes		28,241	98.7	
Informal votes		372	1.3	
Turnout		28,613	73.2	
Labor hold		Swing	−1.0	

== Queensland ==
=== Brisbane ===
1919 Australian federal election: Brisbane
Party	Candidate	Votes	%	±%
Nationalist	Donald Cameron	17,804	49.2	−0.8
Labor	William Finlayson	17,576	48.6	−1.4
Independent	Sine Boland	773	2.1	+2.1
Total formal votes		36,153	94.7	
Informal votes		2,035	5.3	
Turnout		38,188	85.5	
Two-party-preferred result
Nationalist	Donald Cameron	18,436	51.0	+1.0
Labor	William Finlayson	17,717	49.0	−1.0
Nationalist gain from Labor		Swing	+1.0	

=== Capricornia ===
1919 Australian federal election: Capricornia
Party	Candidate	Votes	%	±%
Labor	William Higgs	15,134	52.8	+0.5
Nationalist	Alexander Cameron	13,521	47.2	−0.5
Total formal votes		28,655	98.0	
Informal votes		577	2.0	
Turnout		29,232	87.5	
Labor hold		Swing	+0.5	

=== Darling Downs ===
1919 Australian federal election: Darling Downs
Party	Candidate	Votes	%	±%
Nationalist	Littleton Groom	17,974	57.7	+1.6
Labor	Phil Alke	13,180	42.3	−1.6
Total formal votes		31,154	98.2	
Informal votes		569	1.8	
Turnout		31,723	87.1	
Nationalist hold		Swing	+1.6	

=== Herbert ===
1919 Australian federal election: Herbert
Party	Candidate	Votes	%	±%
Nationalist	Fred Bamford	17,470	51.0	−0.3
Labor	Eugene McKenna	15,872	46.3	−2.4
Independent	Henry Madden	493	1.4	+1.4
Independent	Terence Haren	443	1.3	+1.3
Total formal votes		34,278	90.5	
Informal votes		3,583	9.5	
Turnout		37,861	87.3	
Two-party-preferred result
Nationalist	Fred Bamford		52.4	+1.1
Labor	Eugene McKenna		47.6	−1.1
Nationalist hold		Swing	+1.1	

=== Kennedy ===
1919 Australian federal election: Kennedy
Party	Candidate	Votes	%	±%
Labor	Charles McDonald	13,360	61.7	−1.1
Nationalist	James Suter	8,283	38.3	+1.1
Total formal votes		21,643	96.8	
Informal votes		704	3.2	
Turnout		22,347	76.4	
Labor hold		Swing	−1.1	

=== Lilley ===
1919 Australian federal election: Lilley
Party	Candidate	Votes	%	±%
Nationalist	George Mackay	25,473	63.3	+0.6
Labor	Joseph Johnston	14,762	36.7	−0.6
Total formal votes		40,235	97.8	
Informal votes		912	2.2	
Turnout		41,147	84.3	
Nationalist hold		Swing	+0.6	

=== Maranoa ===
1919 Australian federal election: Maranoa
Party	Candidate	Votes	%	±%
Labor	Jim Page	12,127	52.7	−2.1
Primary Producers	James Hunter	10,885	47.3	+47.3
Total formal votes		23,012	97.6	
Informal votes		563	2.4	
Turnout		23,575	77.1	
Labor hold		Swing	−2.1	

=== Moreton ===
1919 Australian federal election: Moreton
Party	Candidate	Votes	%	±%
Nationalist	Arnold Wienholt	17,834	55.2	+5.1
Labor	William Heffernan	14,491	44.8	−5.1
Total formal votes		32,325	98.3	
Informal votes		572	1.7	
Turnout		32,897	84.8	
Nationalist hold		Swing	+5.1	

=== Oxley ===
1919 Australian federal election: Oxley
Party	Candidate	Votes	%	±%
Nationalist	James Bayley	22,576	53.8	+1.0
Labor	James Sharpe	19,401	46.2	−1.0
Total formal votes		41,977	98.2	
Informal votes		791	1.8	
Turnout		42,768	87.4	
Nationalist hold		Swing	+1.0	

=== Wide Bay ===
1919 Australian federal election: Wide Bay
Party	Candidate	Votes	%	±%
Nationalist	Edward Corser	16,272	54.3	+1.4
Labor	Frederick Martyn	13,685	45.7	−1.4
Total formal votes		29,957	98.2	
Informal votes		534	1.8	
Turnout		30,491	87.2	
Nationalist hold		Swing	+1.4	

== South Australia ==
=== Adelaide ===
1919 Australian federal election: Adelaide
Party	Candidate	Votes	%	±%
Nationalist	Reginald Blundell	10,523	50.8	+50.8
Labor	George Edwin Yates	10,184	49.2	−50.8
Total formal votes		20,707	96.3	
Informal votes		785	3.7	
Turnout		21,492	62.3	
Nationalist gain from Labor		Swing	+50.8	

=== Angas ===
1919 Australian federal election: Angas
Party	Candidate	Votes	%	±%
Labor	Moses Gabb	9,468	50.7	+1.5
Nationalist	Paddy Glynn	9,217	49.3	−1.5
Total formal votes		18,685	96.8	
Informal votes		615	3.2	
Turnout		19,300	64.5	
Labor gain from Nationalist		Swing	+1.5	

=== Barker ===
1919 Australian federal election: Barker
Party	Candidate	Votes	%	±%
Nationalist	John Livingston	13,233	60.0	−3.9
Labor	Albert Davies	7,023	31.8	−4.3
Independent	Alexander Williams	1,813	8.2	+8.2
Total formal votes		22,069	90.8	
Informal votes		2,238	9.2	
Turnout		24,307	62.3	
Two-party-preferred result
Nationalist	John Livingston		64.1	+0.2
Labor	Albert Davies		35.9	−0.2
Nationalist hold		Swing	+0.2	

=== Boothby ===
1919 Australian federal election: Boothby
Party	Candidate	Votes	%	±%
Nationalist	William Story	18,501	63.5	−1.0
Labor	Stanley Whitford	8,872	30.4	−5.1
Independent	George Illingworth	1,779	6.1	+6.1
Total formal votes		29,152	92.6	
Informal votes		2,341	7.4	
Turnout		31,493	67.3	
Two-party-preferred result
Nationalist	William Story		66.6	+2.1
Labor	Stanley Whitford		33.4	−2.1
Nationalist hold		Swing	+2.1	

=== Grey ===
1919 Australian federal election: Grey
Party	Candidate	Votes	%	±%
Nationalist	Alexander Poynton	11,642	51.8	−5.9
Labor	Charles Gray	10,843	48.2	+5.9
Total formal votes		22,485	97.3	
Informal votes		616	2.7	
Turnout		23,101	68.3	
Nationalist hold		Swing	−5.9	

=== Hindmarsh ===
1919 Australian federal election: Hindmarsh
Party	Candidate	Votes	%	±%
Labor	Norman Makin	17,195	51.4	+7.2
Nationalist	William Archibald	16,279	48.6	−7.2
Total formal votes		33,474	97.4	
Informal votes		906	2.6	
Turnout		34,380	69.1	
Labor gain from Nationalist		Swing	+7.2	

=== Wakefield ===
1919 Australian federal election: Wakefield
Party	Candidate	Votes	%	±%
Nationalist	Richard Foster	10,872	49.7	−6.5
Labor	Edward Stokes	8,067	36.9	−6.9
Farmers and Settlers	Herbert Tuck	2,946	13.5	+13.5
Total formal votes		21,885	91.1	
Informal votes		2,133	8.9	
Turnout		24,018	69.8	
Two-party-preferred result
Nationalist	Richard Foster	12,780	58.4	+2.2
Labor	Edward Stokes	9,105	41.6	−2.2
Nationalist hold		Swing	+2.2	

== Western Australia ==
=== Dampier ===
1919 Australian federal election: Dampier
Party	Candidate	Votes	%	±%
Nationalist	Henry Gregory	10,440	64.6	−6.8
Labor	Thomas Lowry	5,720	35.4	+6.8
Total formal votes		16,160	97.6	
Informal votes		405	2.4	
Turnout		16,565	55.9	
Nationalist hold		Swing	−6.8	

=== Fremantle ===
1919 Australian federal election: Fremantle
Party	Candidate	Votes	%	±%
Nationalist	Reginald Burchell	15,988	60.8	−8.1
Labor	Andrew Clementson	10,294	39.2	+8.1
Total formal votes		26,282	97.6	
Informal votes		660	2.4	
Turnout		26,942	62.0	
Nationalist hold		Swing	−8.1	

=== Kalgoorlie ===
1919 Australian federal election: Kalgoorlie
Party	Candidate	Votes	%	±%
Labor	Hugh Mahon	9,220	52.1	+3.4
Nationalist	Edward Heitmann	8,480	47.9	−3.4
Total formal votes		17,700	98.7	
Informal votes		237	1.3	
Turnout		17,937	79.3	
Labor gain from Nationalist		Swing	+3.4	

=== Perth ===
1919 Australian federal election: Perth
Party	Candidate	Votes	%	±%
Nationalist	James Fowler	7,721	38.4	−7.7
Labor	John Curtin	6,877	34.2	+3.7
Nationalist	Lionel Carter	4,699	23.4	+23.4
Ind. Free Trade	Gerald Hartrey	811	4.0	+4.0
Total formal votes		20,108	93.4	
Informal votes		1,419	6.6	
Turnout		21,527	58.4	
Two-party-preferred result
Nationalist	James Fowler	12,275	61.0	−8.5
Labor	John Curtin	7,833	39.0	+8.5
Nationalist hold		Swing	−8.5	

=== Swan ===
1919 Australian federal election: Swan
Party	Candidate	Votes	%	±%
Labor	Edwin Corboy	7,444	39.1	+39.1
Farmers and Settlers	John Prowse	7,313	38.5	+38.5
Nationalist	William Hedges	4,260	22.4	−77.6
Total formal votes		19,017	93.9	
Informal votes		1,246	6.1	
Turnout		20,263	65.4	
Two-party-preferred result
Farmers and Settlers	John Prowse	11,039	58.0	+58.0
Labor	Edwin Corboy	7,978	42.0	+42.0
Farmers and Settlers gain from Labor		Swing	+58.0	

== Tasmania ==
=== Bass ===
1919 Australian federal election: Bass
Party	Candidate	Votes	%	±%
Labor	Alfred Higgins	4,292	35.3	−4.8
Nationalist	Syd Jackson	3,127	25.7	−13.2
Nationalist	Stephen Margetts	2,553	21.0	+21.0
Ind. Nationalist	Jens Jensen	1,689	13.9	+13.9
Independent	Timothy Earley	328	2.7	+2.7
Independent	Luke Bryant	167	1.4	+1.4
Total formal votes		12,156	91.3	
Informal votes		1,155	8.7	
Turnout		13,311	53.7	
Two-party-preferred result
Nationalist	Syd Jackson	6,779	55.8	−4.1
Labor	Alfred Higgins	5,377	44.2	+4.1
Nationalist hold		Swing	−4.1	

=== Darwin ===
1919 Australian federal election: Darwin
Party	Candidate	Votes	%	±%
Nationalist	George Bell	6,630	54.0	−4.8
Labor	Joseph Lyons	5,645	46.0	+4.8
Total formal votes		12,275	97.8	
Informal votes		274	2.2	
Turnout		12,549	67.2	
Nationalist hold		Swing	−4.8	

=== Denison ===
1919 Australian federal election: Denison
Party	Candidate	Votes	%	±%
Nationalist	William Laird Smith	9,505	53.9	−2.4
Labor	King O'Malley	8,141	46.1	+2.4
Total formal votes		17,646	98.3	
Informal votes		298	1.7	
Turnout		17,944	66.6	
Nationalist hold		Swing	−2.4	

=== Franklin ===
1919 Australian federal election: Franklin
Party	Candidate	Votes	%	±%
Nationalist	William McWilliams	7,291	62.1	−37.9
Nationalist	Louis Shoobridge	4,451	37.9	+37.9
Total formal votes		11,742	93.1	
Informal votes		866	6.9	
Turnout		12,608	53.1	
Nationalist hold		Swing	−37.9	

=== Wilmot ===
1919 Australian federal election: Wilmot
Party	Candidate	Votes	%	±%
Nationalist	Llewellyn Atkinson	4,015	46.7	+12.8
Nationalist	Henry McFie	2,368	27.6	+27.6
Country	Norman Cameron	2,210	25.7	+25.7
Total formal votes		8,593	93.4	
Informal votes		711	7.6	
Turnout		9,304	52.0	
Two-party-preferred result
Nationalist	Llewellyn Atkinson	5,169	60.2	+4.0
Nationalist	Henry McFie	3,424	39.8	+39.8
Nationalist hold		Swing	+4.0	

== See also ==
- Candidates of the 1919 Australian federal election
- Members of the Australian House of Representatives, 1919–1922
- Results of the 1919 Australian federal election (Senate)`
