= Members of the Australian Senate, 1917–1920 =

Composition 1914-1916
Government (24) - (5 seat majority)
Nationalist (24)

Opposition (12)
Labor (12) (Note: Labor senator James Long resigned in December 1918 and was replaced by Nationalist Edward Mulcahy.)

Changes in composition

This is a list of members of the Australian Senate from 1917 to 1920. Half of its members were elected at the 5 September 1914 election and had terms notionally starting on 1 July 1914 and finishing on 30 June 1920; the other half were elected at the 5 May 1917 election and had terms starting on 1 July 1917 and finishing on 30 June 1923.

Senator	Party	State	Term ending	Years in office
Thomas Bakhap	Nationalist	Tasmania	1923	1913–1923
Stephen Barker	Labor	Victoria	1920	1910–1920, 1923–1924
John Barnes	Labor	Victoria	1920	1913–1920, 1923–1935
William Kinsey Bolton	Nationalist	Victoria	1923	1917–1923
Richard Buzacott	Nationalist	Western Australia	1923	1910–1923
Thomas Crawford	Nationalist	Queensland	1923	1917–1947
Hugh de Largie	Nationalist	Western Australia	1923	1901–1923
John Earle	Nationalist	Tasmania	1923	1917–1923
George Fairbairn	Nationalist	Victoria	1923	1917–1923
Myles Ferricks	Labor	Queensland	1920	1913–1920
Harry Foll	Nationalist	Queensland	1923	1917–1947
Albert Gardiner	Labor	New South Wales	1920	1910–1926, 1928
Thomas Givens	Nationalist	Queensland	1920	1904–1928
John Grant	Labor	New South Wales	1920	1914–1920, 1923–1928
Robert Guthrie	Nationalist	South Australia	1923	1904–1921
James Guy	Labor	Tasmania	1920	1914–1920
George Henderson	Nationalist	Western Australia	1923	1904–1923
John Keating	Nationalist	Tasmania	1923	1901–1923
James Long (Note: Labor senator James Long resigned on 20 December 1918; on 15 January 1919 Nationalist Edward Mulcahy was appointed to replace him.)	Labor	Tasmania	1920	1910–1918
Patrick Lynch	Nationalist	Western Australia	1920	1907–1938
William Maughan	Labor	Queensland	1920	1913–1920
Allan McDougall	Labor	New South Wales	1920	1910–1920, 1922–1924
Edward Millen	Nationalist	New South Wales	1923	1901–1923
Edward Mulcahy	Nationalist	Tasmania	1919 (Note: Mulcahy was appointed to a casual vacancy and only held office until the earlier of the next election for the House of Representatives or the Senate. In 1919 Mulcahy was elected for the balance of the term ending in 1920.)	1904–1910, 1918–1920
Ted Needham	Labor	Western Australia	1920	1907–1920, 1923–1929
John Newlands	Nationalist	South Australia	1920	1913–1932
David O'Keefe	Labor	Tasmania	1920	1901–1906, 1910–1920
James O'Loghlin	Labor	South Australia	1920	1907, 1913–1920, 1923–1925
George Pearce	Nationalist	Western Australia	1920	1901–1938
William Plain	Nationalist	Victoria	1923	1917–1923, 1925–1938
Herbert Pratten	Nationalist	New South Wales	1923	1917–1921
Matthew Reid	Nationalist	Queensland	1923	1917–1935
James Rowell	Nationalist	South Australia	1923	1917–1923
Edward Russell	Nationalist	Victoria	1920	1907–1925
William Senior	Nationalist	South Australia	1923	1913–1923
John Shannon	Nationalist	South Australia	1920	1912–1913, 1914–1920
Josiah Thomas	Nationalist	New South Wales	1923	1917–1923, 1925–1929
