= 1919 Australian federal election =

- 13 December 1919

All 75 seats in the House of Representatives 38 seats were needed for a majority in the House 19 (of the 36) seats in the Senate
- Registered: 2,849,862 ▲0.51%
- Turnout: 1,977,843 (71.59%) (Note: Turnout in contested seats) (▼6.71 pp)
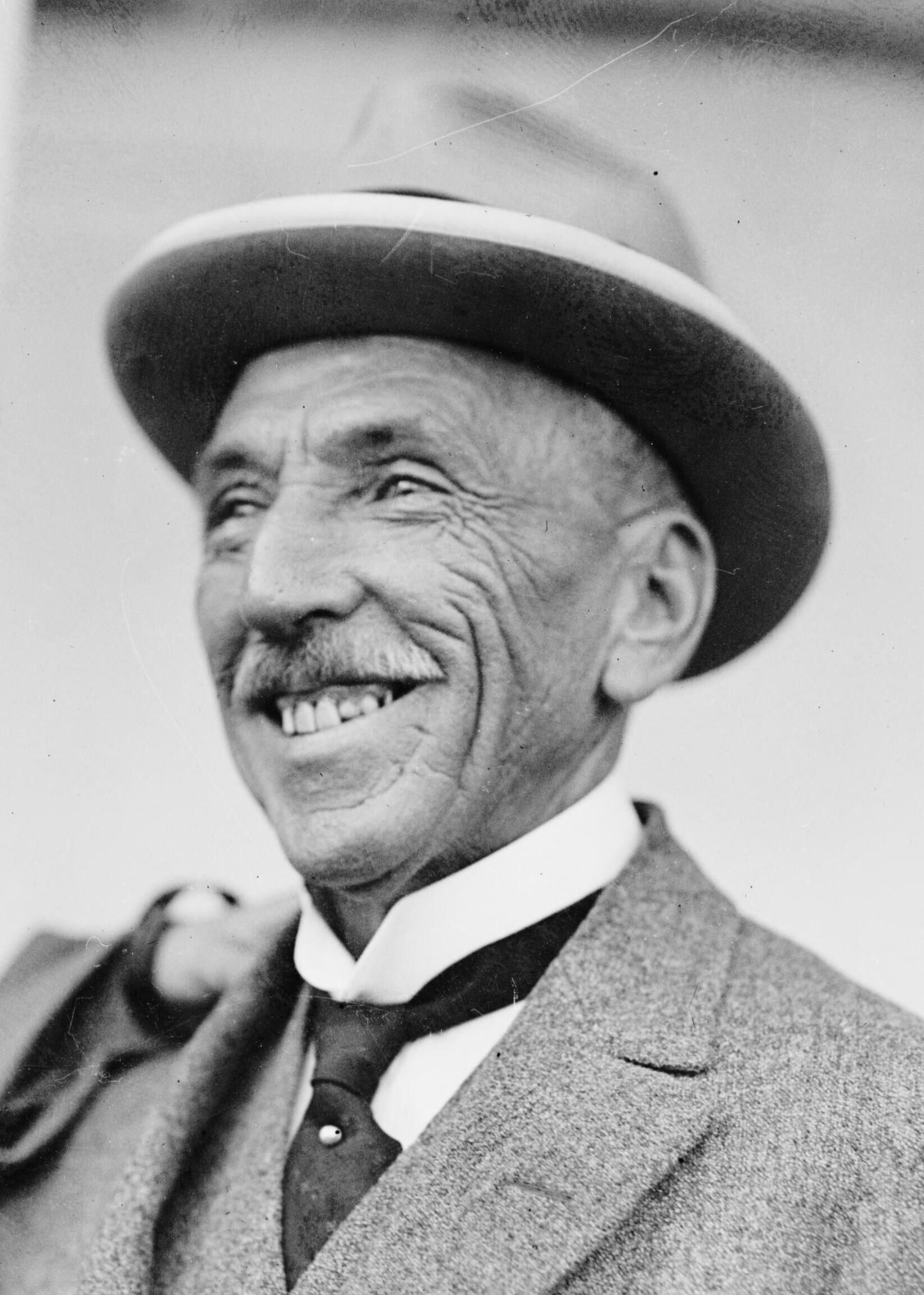

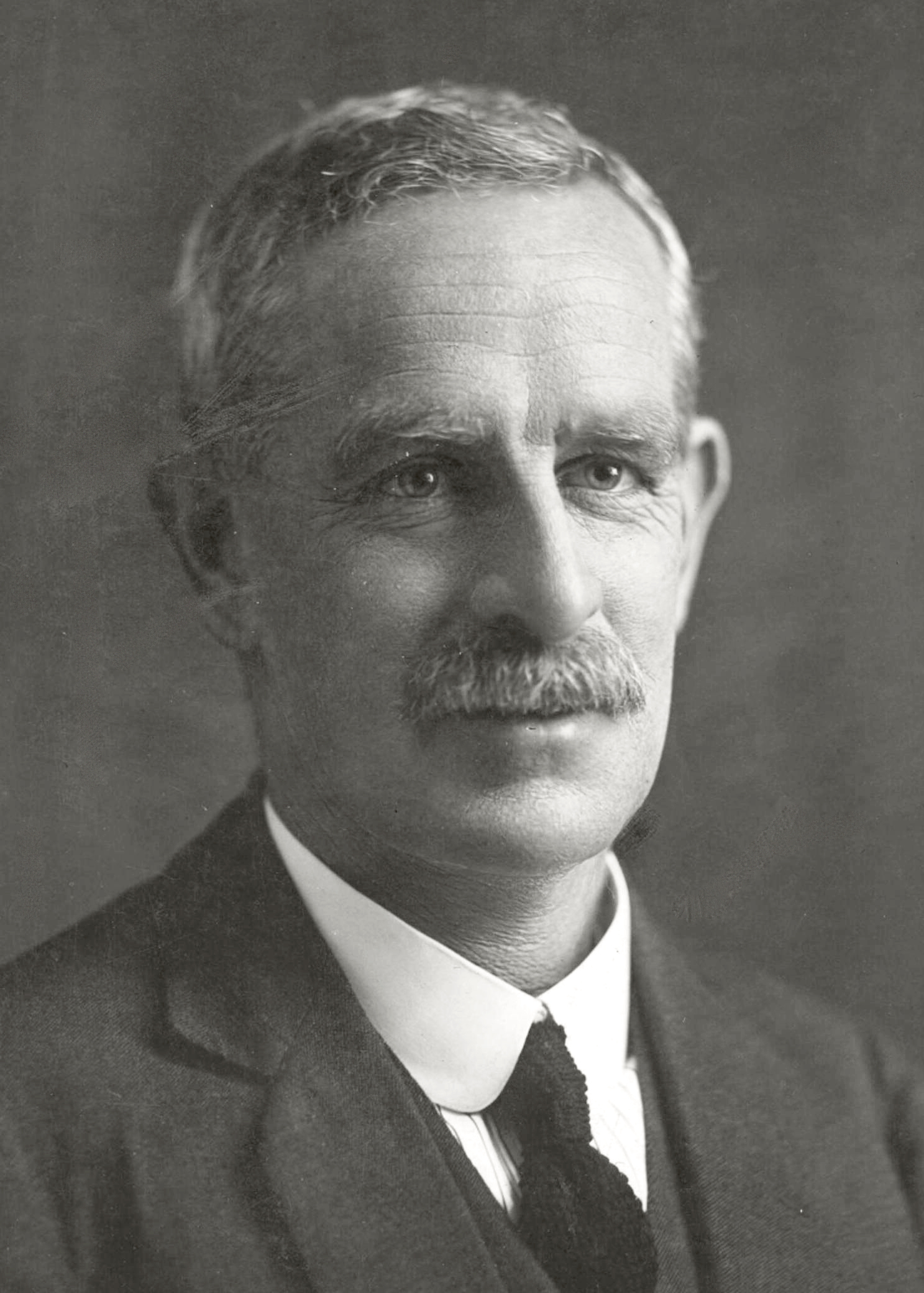
	First party	Second party
Leader	Billy Hughes	Frank Tudor
Party	Nationalist	Labor
Leader since	14 November 1916	14 November 1916
Leader's seat	Bendigo (Vic.)	Yarra (Vic.)
Last election	53 seats	22 seats
Seats won	37	26
Seat change	▼16	▲4
Primary vote	870,959	811,244
Percentage	45.62%	42.49%
- Results by division for the House of Representatives, shaded by winning party's margin of victory
Prime Minister before election
Billy Hughes
Nationalist
Subsequent Prime Minister
Billy Hughes
Nationalist

The 1919 Australian federal election was held on 13 December 1919 to elect members to the Parliament of Australia. All 75 seats in the House of Representatives and 19 of the 36 seats in the Senate were up for election. The incumbent Nationalist Party government won re-election, with Prime Minister Billy Hughes continuing in office.

The 1919 election was the first since the passage of the Commonwealth Electoral Act 1918, which introduced preferential voting for both houses of parliament – instant-runoff voting for the House of Representatives and preferential block voting for the Senate. It was held several months earlier than constitutionally required, so that the government could capitalise on the popularity of Hughes after his return from the Paris Peace Conference. The Nationalists campaigned on the government's war record and appealed to returned soldiers. The Australian Labor Party (ALP), in opposition since the 1916 party split, contested a second election under the formal leadership of Frank Tudor, although Tudor's health issues meant T. J. Ryan was appointed as the party's national campaign director and played a key role in the campaign.

The Nationalists won 37 out of the 75 seats in the House of Representatives, including the seat of Ballaarat by a single vote. The Nationalists also swept the Senate for a second consecutive election, leaving the ALP with just a single senator, Albert Gardiner. Labor won 26 seats in the House, a net gain of four, while 11 seats were won by candidates aligned with farmers' organisations, who formed the first federal parliamentary Country Party after the election. A referendum was held simultaneous to the election, at which the government unsuccessfully sought approval to amend the constitution for increased power over commerce.

== Background ==
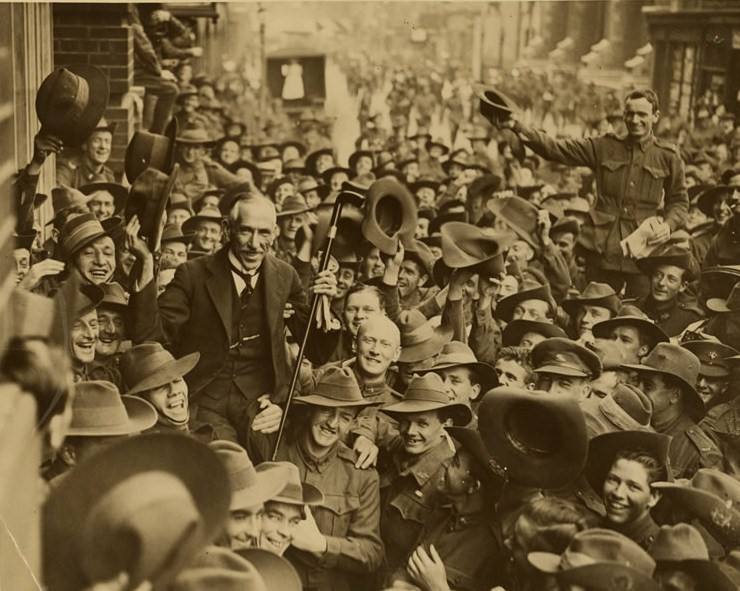
Hughes being carried through George Street, Sydney, upon his return from the Paris Peace Conference in 1919; he was at the height of his popularity during that time

The Nationalist Party, formed after the 1916 Labor Party split, won a large majority at the 1917 federal election. In April 1918, Prime Minister Billy Hughes left Australia to attend the Imperial War Cabinet. He was overseas for sixteen months, which saw the signing of the Armistice of 11 November 1918 and the Paris Peace Conference. He was at the height of his popularity during this time, and was widely feted when he returned to Australia in August 1919. According to Robert Garran, who was both Solicitor-General of Australia and Hughes' personal secretary at the conference, there were three main problems that confronted him upon his return – profiteering, high prices, and industrial unrest.

At the ALP Federal Conference in early October 1919, a resolution was passed calling on T. J. Ryan, premier of Queensland, to enter federal politics. He agreed to do so, and was appointed to the new position of "national campaign director". Con Wallace, MP for West Sydney, agreed to give up the ALP nomination to allow Ryan to win a safe seat. Opposition Leader Frank Tudor remained the party's formal leader, but Ryan had a higher public profile and led the ALP's campaign. According to King O'Malley, who met with him in Hobart a few weeks before the election, Ryan believed that he would become prime minister if Labor won the election.

=== Electoral reform ===
The 1919 federal election was the first to use preferential voting. The Commonwealth Electoral Act 1918 replaced the previous first-past-the-post system used in the House of Representatives, and also re-introduced postal voting. It was amended the following year to also allow preferential voting for the Senate. The new act repealed the existing Commonwealth Franchise Act 1902, but did not alter the terms of the Commonwealth Electoral (War-time) Act 1917, under which naturalised British subjects born in enemy countries were disqualified from voting. This provision mainly affected German-Australians. There was a long history of support for preferential voting in Australia, but the immediate trigger for the new legislation was the decision of farmers' organisations to run candidates of their own in opposition to the Nationalist Party. The Swan by-election in October 1918 saw an ALP candidate elected with just over one-third of the vote, after the Nationalist candidate split the vote with a candidate from the Country Party of Western Australia. The Corangamite by-election in December was the first held under the new system, and resulted in the Victorian Farmers' Union candidate winning from Nationalist preferences.

== Campaign ==
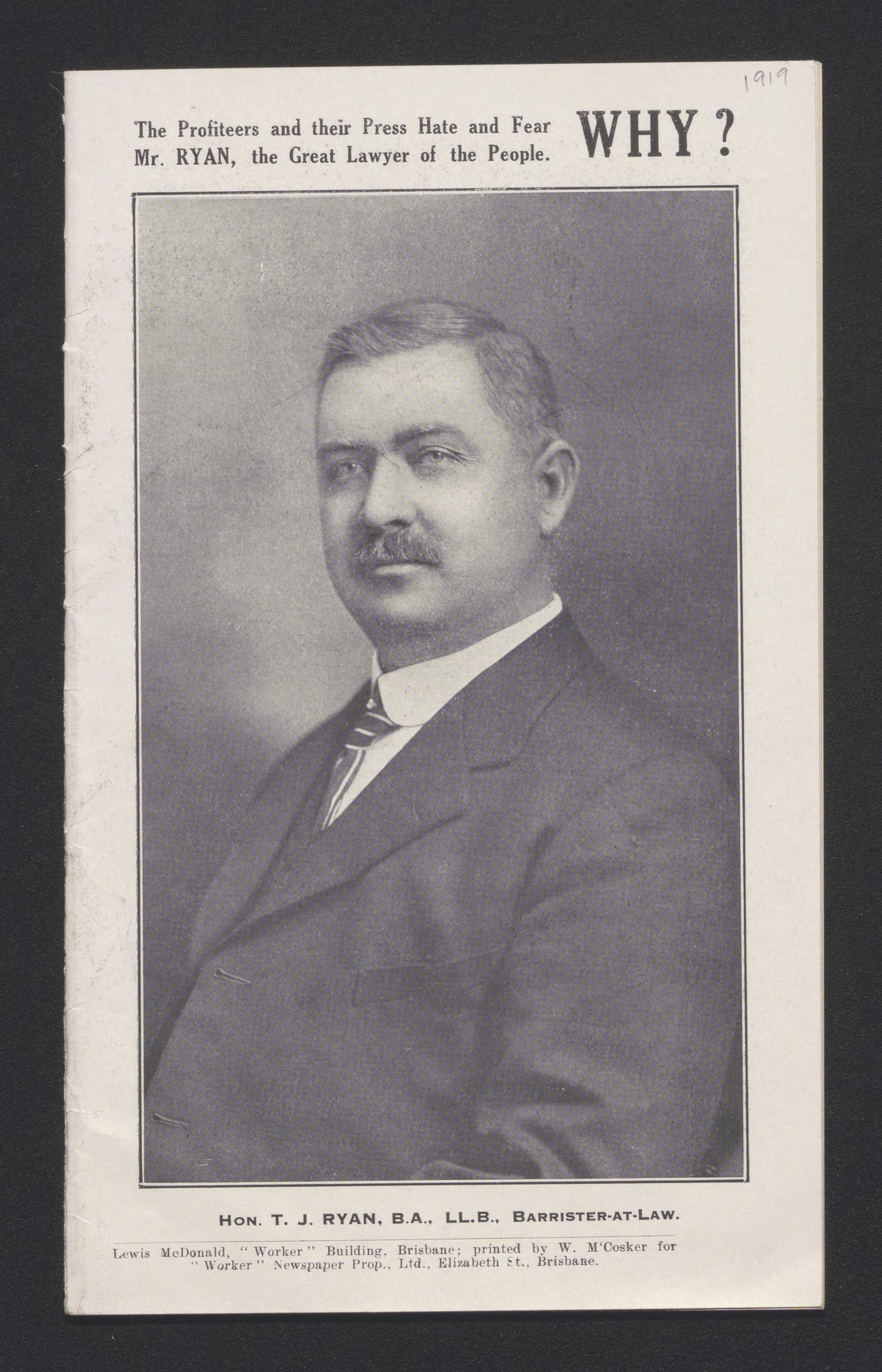
Material used by T. J. Ryan, the Labor Party's national campaign director in 1919

Constitutionally, a new election was not due until early 1920, but the Nationalists wished to hold an early election to capitalise on Hughes' popularity. On 30 September, the party caucus approved an election for 13 December. The writs were formally issued on 3 November, with the close of nominations on 14 November. However, the campaign had begun in earnest after the last sitting day of federal parliament on 24 October.

=== Party platforms ===
==== Nationalists ====
Hughes and the Nationalists sought re-election largely on the basis of their record in government. The prime minister's 90-minute policy speech, delivered in Bendigo on 30 November, was "stronger on generalities than on concrete proposals". Hughes promised to appoint royal commissions on profiteering, the living wage, and taxation, and to call a constitutional convention for 1920. He planned to overhaul industrial relations by setting up a system of industrial councils with a Commonwealth Industrial Court at their apex. The Nationalists also promised government support of industry, primary producers, and immigration.

==== Labor ====
The ALP was ill-prepared for the election – six weeks before the polling date, it had no party manifesto, had preselected few candidates, and the state branches in Victoria and New South Wales were "virtually bankrupt". The party eventually released its manifesto on 4 November, which was signed by Tudor, Ryan, and Jack Holloway. It "showed much of Ryan's hand in its language and political style", and ended with a quote from Abraham Lincoln. Tudor's policy speech was delivered in Melbourne the following day. The party promised an expansion of the welfare system, including the introduction of widows' pensions, child endowment for orphans and children of invalids, and a significant increase in old-age and disability pensions. It also promised to establish a national shipping line, national insurance office, and national medical service, which were to be funded through a wealth tax.

=== Issues ===
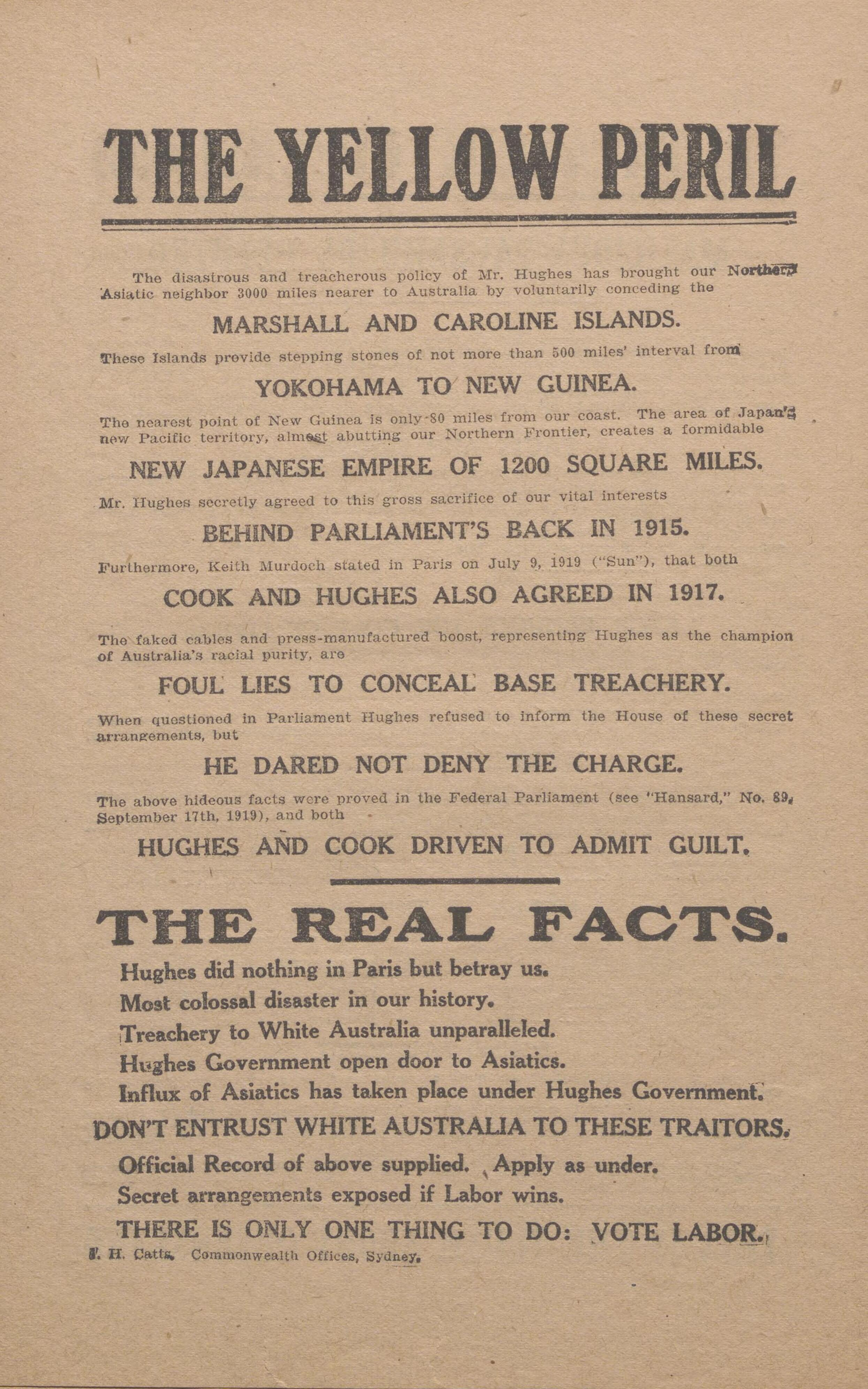
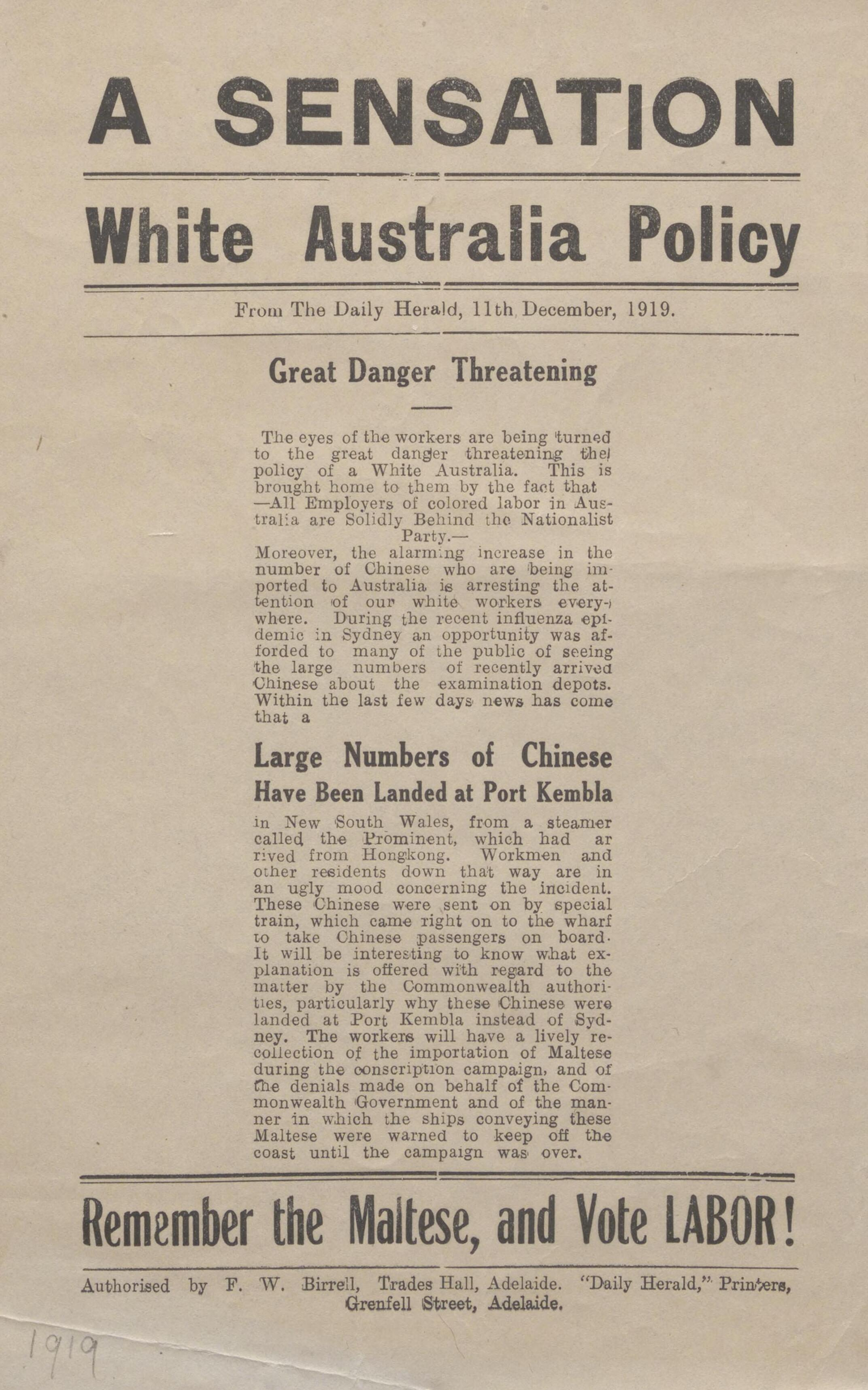
Material used by the ALP attacking Hughes' record on the White Australia policy

The campaign primarily focused on Hughes and Ryan and their respective records. The Round Table observed that "the prominence given to them made genuine political discussion impossible". The Nationalists accused Ryan of disloyalty to the war effort and fostering left-wing extremism, while Labor accused Hughes of mismanaging the war and failing to deal with profiteering. Tudor was "barely considered" in the campaign due to poor health, and twice had to withdraw from campaigning due to "attacks of hemorrhage". The Nationalists claimed Hughes had safeguarded the White Australia policy at the Paris Peace Conference, while the ALP said he had endangered it by failing to stop the Japanese from acquiring the South Seas Mandate. Issues relating to returned soldiers were also prominent, and the 1919 election has been classed as a wartime or "khaki" election, despite it taking place over a year after the Armistice.

==== Returned soldiers ====
Both parties were keen to secure the votes of returned soldiers, and Hughes in particular cultivated them as a new political base. (Note: Earlier in his career he had drawn much of his support from trade unionists, but this diminished when the ALP split over conscription and he was forced out of the labour movement.) In 1919, there were about 270,000 returned soldiers out of a total enrolment of 2.85 million; they and their family members were viewed as a "vital political constituency". While Hughes was already popular with the armed forces, he sought an explicit endorsement from the main lobby group for returned soldiers, the Returned Sailors and Soldiers Imperial League of Australia (RSSILA). Its newly elected president was Gilbert Dyett, a 28-year-old junior officer who was protective of the organisation's independence and political neutrality. In the lead-up to the election Hughes had five separate meetings with Dyett and other officials. He was willing to make concessions on repatriation policy and other related issues, but repeatedly stressed that the RSSILA's agenda could only be enacted if the Nationalists won, for which a formal endorsement was necessary. Dyett was unwilling to compromise his neutrality, and consequently the RSSILA "gained almost every concession they sought, yet maintained their independence by holding out to Hughes the prospect of returned soldier support while never granting it".

==== Sectarianism ====
Sectarianism between Catholics and Protestants became an issue in the campaign. In early November, Ryan chaired an Irish Race Convention in Melbourne, which had been organised by Catholic archbishop Daniel Mannix to support Irish home rule. Mannix tacitly endorsed Ryan as prime minister, stating that "Ireland and Irish Australia have no reason to be ashamed of him, either as Premier of Queensland or as the prospective Prime Minister of the Commonwealth". Additionally, the Catholic press in Melbourne and Sydney "unashamedly support[ed] Ryan and his party". In response, Protestant organisations ran advertisements claiming a Labor government would see Australia controlled by the Catholic Church.

=== McDougall incident ===
One issue in the campaign was the anti-war poem "The White Man's Burden", written by John Keith McDougall in 1900 during the Boer War. It contained lines critical of soldiers, describing them as "sordid killers who murder for a fee", "hog-souled and dirty-handed", and "fools and flunkeys". The poem was republished on a number of occasions during World War I – in January 1915 by the Labor Call, the official ALP newspaper in Victoria, and later by McDougall's opponents at the 1915 Grampians by-election and 1917 federal election. On 13 November 1919, Melbourne Punch re-published excerpts from the poem, contrasting them with the ALP's election manifesto which praised soldiers. Pro-government newspapers did likewise, particularly The Argus, and a leaflet containing the poem was widely circulated. Hughes frequently quoted the poem in his campaign speeches, stating that returned soldiers faced a choice between "those who stood by you, or those who spoke contemptuously of you as 'sordid killers'". Pro-opposition newspapers noted that Hughes had in fact campaigned for McDougall four years later, when he was still a member of the ALP.

The outcry over McDougall's poem was directed at the ALP rather than its author, who was often not identified. However, a week before the election, a group of about 20 ex-soldiers kidnapped McDougall from his property in Ararat, before tarring and feathering him and dumping him in the street, bound and blindfolded. In February 1920, six of the men were convicted of assault and fined £5 each, while receiving sympathy from the magistrate and much of the press.

== Results ==
=== House of Representatives ===
Out of the 75 seats in the House of Representatives, 37 were won by the Nationalists and 26 by the Labor Party. In Melbourne Ports and Newcastle, the ALP candidate was elected unopposed. Eleven of the remaining twelve seats were won by candidates endorsed by or aligned with the farmers' organisations in each state; they subsequently formed the Country Party. The remaining seat was won by Frederick Francis, who stood as an "independent Nationalist" in the Melbourne seat of Henty and defeated the sitting Nationalist member.

Government ministers Paddy Glynn and William Webster were among those who lost their seats. The closest margin of victory was in Ballaarat, where Nationalist Edwin Kerby defeated the sitting Labor member Charles McGrath by a single vote. The result was successfully challenged in the Court of Disputed Returns, with Justice Isaac Isaacs criticising the "almost incredible carelessness" of the electoral officers. McGrath won the seat back at the resulting by-election. Mary Grant was the only woman to stand for the House of Representatives, polling 18.1 percent of the vote in Kooyong.

House of Reps (IRV) — 1919–1922—Turnout 71.59% (Non-CV) — Informal 3.47%
Party	First preference votes	%	Swing	Seats	Change
Nationalist	870,959	45.62	−8.60	37	−16
Labor	811,244	42.49	−1.45	26	+4
Country (Note: At the 1919 election, the Country Party did not yet exist as either a parliamentary party or a nationwide political organisation. For comparative purposes, the votes amassed by the various state organisations are usually tallied together. In the House of Representatives, the total can be broken down into 79,839 votes for the Victorian Farmers' Union, 16,521 for the Farmers' and Settlers' Association of New South Wales, 10,885 for the Primary Producers' Union (Queensland), 7,313 for the Country Party of Western Australia, 2,946 for the Farmers and Settlers Association (South Australia), and 2,210 for country-aligned candidates in Tasmania, where there was no organisation. Several candidates in New South Wales were cross-endorsed by the Nationalists and the FSA; they tallied 46,730 votes, which are grouped with the Country Party as all three successful cross-endorsed candidates joined that party. In addition, the successful Nationalist candidate for Dampier, who tallied 10,440 votes, was cross-endorsed by the Western Australian FSA, and is likewise grouped with the Country Party as he joined it upon formation. In the Senate, the total can be broken down into 100,620 votes for the Farmers and Settlers Association (NSW), 50,620 for the Victorian Farmers' Union, and 11,853 for the Country Party of Western Australia.)	166,444	8.72	+8.72	11	+11
Industrial Socialist Labor	3,637	0.19	+0.19	0	0
Independents	56,947	2.98	+1.13	1	+1
Total	1,909,231			75	

First preference vote
Nationalist	45.62%
Labor	42.49%
Country	8.72%
Independent/Other	3.17%

Parliament seats
Nationalist	49.33%
Labor	34.67%
Country	14.67%
Independent/Other	1.33%

=== Senate ===
In the Senate, the Nationalists won 18 out of the 19 seats up for election. (Note: In addition to the required half-Senate election, a supplementary election was held in Tasmania to fill the casual vacancy caused by the resignation of James Long. Long resigned from the Senate in December 1918, with Edward Mulcahy appointed as his replacement. At the time, section 15 of the constitution mandated that casual vacancies could only be filled by an appointee until the next general election, at which point a supplementary election would be held.) The party had previously won all 18 seats at the 1917 election, leaving them with "an absurdly large majority" – after 1 July 1920, when the new senators began their term, Albert Gardiner was the only non-government senator and the sole representative of the Labor Party in the chamber. The country parties failed to win any seats, but some Nationalist senators were sympathetic to their views. Mary McMahon was the only woman to stand for the Senate, polling 0.3 percent of the statewide vote in New South Wales.

Senate (P BV) — 1919–22—Turnout 71.33% (Non-CV) — Informal 8.61%
Party	First preference votes	%	Swing	Seats won	Seats held	Change
Nationalist	861,990	46.40	−8.97	18	35	+11
Labor	795,858	42.84	−0.89	1	1	−11
Country	163,293	8.79	+8.79	0	0	0
Socialist Labor	10,508	0.57	+0.06	0	0	0
Independent	26,374	1.42	+1.03	0	0	0
Total	1,857,823			19	36	

== Seats changing hands ==
Seat	Pre-1919			Swing	Post-1919		
Seat	Party	Member	Margin	Swing	Margin	Member	Party
Adelaide, SA	Labor	George Edwin Yates	100.0	50.8	0.8	Reginald Blundell	Nationalist
Angas, SA	Nationalist	Paddy Glynn	0.8	1.5	0.7	Moses Gabb	Labor
Ballaarat, Vic	Labor	Charles McGrath	100.0	50.0	0.0	Edwin Kerby	Nationalist
Brisbane, Qld	Labor	William Finlayson	0.0	1.0	1.0	Donald Cameron	Nationalist
Calare, NSW	Nationalist	Henry Pigott	1.8	4.1	2.3	Thomas Lavelle	Labor
Cowper, NSW	Nationalist	John Thomson	100.0	71.6	21.6	Earle Page	Farmers & Settlers
Grampians, Vic	Nationalist	Edmund Jowett	4.8	N/A	8.2	Edmund Jowett	Victorian Farmers
Gwydir, NSW	Nationalist	William Webster	6.5	9.7	3.2	Lou Cunningham	Labor
Henty, Vic	Nationalist	James Boyd	20.6	23.2	2.9	Frederick Francis	Independent
Hindmarsh, SA	Nationalist	William Archibald	5.8	7.2	1.4	Norman Makin	Labor
Hume, NSW	Nationalist	Franc Falkiner	1.9	9.4	7.5	Parker Moloney	Labor
Indi, Vic	Nationalist	John Leckie	6.2	6.4	12.6	Robert Cook	Victorian Farmers
Kalgoorlie, WA	Nationalist	Edward Heitmann	1.3	3.4	2.1	Hugh Mahon	Labor
Swan, WA	Labor	Edwin Corboy	1.5	N/A	8.0	John Prowse	Farmers & Settlers
Werriwa, NSW	Nationalist	John Lynch	2.8	3.8	1.0	Bert Lazzarini	Labor
Wimmera, Vic	Nationalist	Sydney Sampson	100.0	59.5	9.5	Percy Stewart	Victorian Farmers

- Members listed in italics did not contest their seat at this election.

== Post-election pendulum ==
Government seats
Nationalist Party
Marginal
Ballaarat (Vic)	Edwin Kerby	NAT	00.0
Adelaide (SA)	Reginald Blundell	NAT	00.8
Brisbane (Qld)	Donald Cameron	NAT	01.0
Eden-Monaro (NSW)	Austin Chapman	NAT	01.2
Riverina (NSW)	John Chanter	NAT	01.3
Fawkner (Vic)	George Maxwell	NAT	01.5
Grey (SA)	Alexander Poynton	NAT	01.8
Herbert (Qld)	Fred Bamford	NAT	02.4
Illawarra (NSW)	Hector Lamond	NAT	03.1
Robertson (NSW)	William Fleming	NAT	03.5
Oxley (Qld)	James Bayley	NAT	03.8
Denison (Tas)	William Laird Smith	NAT	03.9
Darwin (Tas)	George Bell	NAT	04.0
Wannon (Vic)	Arthur Rodgers	NAT	04.1
Wide Bay (Qld)	Edward Corser	NAT	04.3
Bendigo (Vic)	Billy Hughes	NAT	05.0
Gippsland (Vic)	George Wise	NAT	05.2 v VFU
Moreton (Qld)	Arnold Wienholt	NAT	05.2
Bass (Tas)	Syd Jackson	NAT	05.8
Fairly safe
Nepean (NSW)	Eric Bowden	NAT	07.1
New England (NSW)	Alexander Hay	NAT	07.3
Lang (NSW)	Elliot Johnson	NAT	07.3
Corio (Vic)	John Lister	NAT	07.5
Darling Downs (Qld)	Littleton Groom	NAT	07.7
Wakefield (SA)	Richard Foster	NAT	08.4
Safe
Wilmot (Tas)	Llewellyn Atkinson	NAT	10.2 v NAT
Fremantle (WA)	Reginald Burchell	NAT	10.8
Perth (WA)	James Fowler	NAT	11.0
Parkes (NSW)	Walter Marks	NAT	11.5
Franklin (Tas)	William McWilliams	NAT	12.1 v NAT
Lilley (Qld)	George Mackay	NAT	13.3
Wentworth (NSW)	Charles Marr	NAT	13.6
Barker (SA)	John Livingston	NAT	14.1
Kooyong (Vic)	Robert Best	NAT	14.3 v IND
Dampier (WA)	Henry Gregory	NAT	14.6
Balaclava (Vic)	William Watt	NAT	14.9
Flinders (Vic)	Stanley Bruce	NAT	15.5
Boothby (SA)	William Story	NAT	16.6
Very safe
Richmond (NSW)	Walter Massy-Greene	NAT	22.5
Parramatta (NSW)	Joseph Cook	NAT	22.6
North Sydney (NSW)	Granville Ryrie	NAT	25.5

Non-government seats
Australian Labor Party and Country Party
Marginal
Angas (SA)	Moses Gabb	ALP	00.7
Werriwa (NSW)	Bert Lazzarini	ALP	01.0
Hindmarsh (SA)	Norman Makin	ALP	01.4
Kalgoorlie (WA)	Hugh Mahon	ALP	02.1
Maribyrnong (Vic)	James Fenton	ALP	02.1
Calare (NSW)	Thomas Lavelle	ALP	02.3
Maranoa (Qld)	Jim Page	ALP	02.7 v PPU
Capricornia (Qld)	William Higgs	ALP	02.8
Gwydir (NSW)	Lou Cunningham	ALP	03.2
Macquarie (NSW)	Samuel Nicholls	ALP	03.2
Bourke (Vic)	Frank Anstey	ALP	03.2
Barrier (NSW)	Michael Considine	ALP	03.8 v IND
Fairly safe
Batman (Vic)	Frank Brennan	ALP	07.1
Hume (NSW)	Parker Moloney	ALP	07.5
East Sydney (NSW)	John West	ALP	07.8
Swan (WA)	John Prowse	F&SA	08.0 v ALP
Grampians (Vic)	Edmund Jowett	VFU	08.2 v ALP
Hunter (NSW)	Matthew Charlton	ALP	08.9
Wimmera (Vic)	Percy Stewart	VFU	09.5 v NAT
Dalley (NSW)	William Mahony	ALP	09.7
Safe
Corangamite (Vic)	William Gibson	VFU	10.4 v ALP
Kennedy (Qld)	Charles McDonald	ALP	11.7
Darling (NSW)	Arthur Blakeley	ALP	11.8
Indi (Vic)	Robert Cook	VFU	12.6 v ALP
Echuca (Vic)	William Hill	VFU	14.0 v NAT
Melbourne (Vic)	William Maloney	ALP	15.6
Cook (NSW)	James Catts	ALP	15.7
South Sydney (NSW)	Edward Riley	ALP	18.3
Very safe
Yarra (Vic)	Frank Tudor	ALP	20.3
Cowper (NSW)	Earle Page	F&SA	21.6 v ALP
West Sydney (NSW)	T. J. Ryan	ALP	22.2
Melbourne Ports (Vic)	James Mathews	ALP	unopposed
Newcastle (NSW)	David Watkins	ALP	unopposed
Independents
Henty (Vic)	Frederick Francis	IND	02.9 v NAT

== Aftermath and analysis ==
According to Hughes' biographer L. F. Fitzhardinge, "the result of the election gave no satisfaction to anyone". The Nationalists were the only party capable of forming a government, but their failure to win an absolute majority weakened the position of Hughes within the party. Neither of the referendum questions carried. Ryan attributed the ALP's defeat to the new voting system, while James Catts, the party's campaign director in New South Wales, stated in January 1920 that "the defeat of Labor is due to Labor". Senior Labor MP William Higgs publicly blamed the election result on interference from the organisational wing, and was expelled from the party in February 1920. He sat as an independent for a period before joining the Nationalists later in the year. It has been suggested that anti-Irish sentiment may have played a part in the ALP's failure to win more seats. The result led some within the party to question the wisdom of Archbishop Mannix involving himself in politics.

The new House of Representatives proved much less stable than its immediate predecessors. According to Gavin Souter, the author of an official history of parliament, the most notable result of the 1919 election was the emergence of the Country Party as a force in federal politics. On 22 January 1920, nine of the crossbench MPs agreed to form a parliamentary party, which they named the Australian Country Party. Two others joined the Country Party in the month before parliament opened on 26 February, leaving it with eleven MPs out of 75. William McWilliams was elected as the party's inaugural leader. Tudor moved a motion of no confidence in the government on 3 March, which was defeated by 45 votes to 22. The Country Party generally supported the government's agenda over the course of the parliament.

The election greatly increased the number of returned soldiers in parliament, which rose from four to sixteen; all but two were Nationalists. According to Crotty (2019), the concessions Hughes made in an attempt to gain the returned-soldier vote "ensured two of Australia's major wartime legacies: a powerful, united and well-connected veterans' organisation, and a repatriation system that was perhaps the world's most generous".

== See also ==
- Candidates of the 1919 Australian federal election
- Members of the Australian House of Representatives, 1919–1922
- Members of the Australian Senate, 1920–1923

== Sources ==
- Fitzhardinge, L. F. (1979). William Morris Hughes: A Political Biography. Vol. II: The Little Digger, 1914–1952. Angus & Robertson. ISBN 0207132453.
- Joyner, Conrad (1959). "W. M. Hughes and the 'Powers' Referendum of 1919: A Master Politician at Work". Australian Journal of Politics & History. 5 (1): 15–23. doi:10.1111/j.1467-8497.1959.tb00487.x.
- King, Terry (1983). "The Tarring and Feathering of J. K. McDougall: 'Dirty Tricks' in the 1919 Federal Election". Labour History. 45 (45): 54–67. doi:10.2307/27508605. JSTOR 27508605.
- Murphy, D. J. (1975). T. J. Ryan: A Political Biography. University of Queensland Press. ISBN 0702209929.
- Souter, Gavin (1988). Acts of Parliament:A Narrative History of the Senate and House of Representatives. Melbourne University Press. ISBN 0522844081.
