= Block approval voting =

Winner-take-all approval voting

Block approval voting (also called unlimited voting, in reference to limited voting) is a winner-take-all system where each voter either approves or disapproves of each candidate, and the k candidates with the most approval votes win (where k is the predetermined committee size). It does not provide proportional representation.

== Example with comparison ==
Candidates are running in a 3 member district of the 10000 voters. Voters may not cast more than one vote for a single candidate.

- Under block approval voting (unlimited voting) voter would vote for any candidates with no limit.
- Under limited block approval voting voter would cast up to 6 votes maximum (twice as many as there are winners).
- Under (plurality) block voting, voter would cast up to 3 votes (but do not have to).
- Under the single non-transferable vote, voter would cast 1 vote.
- Under the single transferable vote, voter would cast 1 vote but mark back-up alternatives to be used if neeeded

Party A has about 35% support among the electorate (with one particularly well-like candidate); Party B around 25% (with two well-liked candidates); and the remaining voters primarily support independent candidates but mostly lean towards party B if they have to choose between the two parties. All voters vote sincerely; there is no tactical voting.

Candidate	Party	Block approval voting				Plurality block voting				Single non-transferable vote			
Candidate	Party	Votes	%	Elected?		Votes	%	Elected?		Votes	%	Elected?	
Candidate A1	Party A	4200	42%	8.		3555	36%	3.	check	800	8%	4.	
Candidate A2	Party A	4500	45%	5.		3700	37%	1.	check	1900	19%	1.	check
Candidate A3	Party A	3900	39%	9.		3600	36%	2.	check	700	7%	9.	
Candidate B1	Party B	5200	52%	1.	check	2600	26%	4.		900	9%	3.	check
Candidate B2	Party B	5000	50%	2.	check	2500	25%	5.		1100	11%	2.	check
Candidate B3	Party B	4700	47%	4.		2400	24%	6.		400	4%	12.	
Candidate I1	Independent	4400	44%	6.		2300	23%	8.		800	8%	4.	
Candidate I2	Independent	4900	49%	3.	check	2395	20%	7.		800	8%	4.	
Candidate I3	Independent	4400	44%	6.		1900	19%	9.		700	7%	7.	
Candidate I4	Independent	3900	39%	9.		1800	15%	10		700	7%	7.	
Candidate I5	Independent	2600	26%	11.		650	7%	11.		600	6%	10.	
Candidate I6	Independent	2300	23%	12.		600	6%	12.		500	5%	11.	

- The 3 most popular candidates according to voters' preferences are elected, regardless of party affiliation.
- Under the single non-transferable vote (not a type of approval voting), the 3 most popular candidates according to voters first preferences are elected, regardless of party affiliation. Party B takes two seats, more than its proportional due.
- Under (plurality) block voting, the party with plurality support most likely wins all seats, so Party A likely takes all the seats, more than its proportional due.
- Under limited block approval voting voters, voters of independent candidates may use their extra votes to help candidates other than their top 3, which may result in the reversal of the plurality block vote result. Party B candidates would get votes from Independent voters.
- Under block approval voting, any party-affiliated or independent candidates particularly popular among the district voters may be elected. Voters of independent candidates may use their extra votes to help candidates other than their top 3, which may result in the reversal of the plurality block vote result. But it is possible that about half of the district voters would elect no representatives. One major party or another might take all the other seats.
