= Members of the Australian Senate, 1920–1923 =

Senate composition at 1 July 1920
Government (34) - (16 seat majority) (Note: Changes to the Senate in chronological order, (Note: Appointed to a casual vacancy and only held office until the earlier of the next election for the House of Representatives or the Senate.) were Guthrie died, (Note: Nationalist senator Robert Guthrie died on 20 January 1921; on 16 February Nationalist Edward Vardon was appointed to replace him however Vardon's appointment lapsed on 4 August 1921 due to lack of confirmation by the South Australian Parliament.) Vardon's appointment lapsed, (Note: Nationalist Vardon was reappointed on 9 August 1921until the 16 December 1922 election, when he was defeated by Labor candidate Bert Hoare for the remainder of the term finishing on 30 June 1923.) Pratten resigned, (Note: Nationalist senator Herbert Pratten resigned on 23 November 1921 to contest successfully the 1922 election for the House of Representatives seat of Parramatta; on 15 December Nationalist Henry Garling was appointed to replace him until the 16 December 1922 election, when he was defeated by Labor candidate Allan McDougall for the remainder of the term finishing on 30 June 1923.) Adamson died, (Note: Nationalist senator John Adamson died on 2 May 1922; on 26 May Labor member John MacDonald was appointed to replace him until the 16 December 1922 election, when he was defeated by Nationalist candidate William Thompson for the remainder of the term finishing on 30 June 1926.))
Nationalist (34)

Opposition (3)
Labor (2)

This is a list of members of the Australian Senate from 1920 to 1923. Half of its members were elected at the 5 May 1917 election and had terms starting on 1 July 1917 and finishing on 30 June 1923; the other half were elected at the 13 December 1919 election and had terms starting on 1 July 1920 and finishing on 30 June 1926.

Senator	Party	State	Term ending	Years in office
John Adamson	Nationalist	Queensland	1926	1920–1922
Thomas Bakhap	Nationalist	Tasmania	1923	1913–1923
Benjamin Benny	Nationalist	South Australia	1926	1920–1926
William Bolton	Nationalist	Victoria	1923	1917–1923
Richard Buzacott	Nationalist	Western Australia	1923	1910–1923
Charles Cox	Nationalist	New South Wales	1926	1920–1938
Thomas Crawford	Nationalist	Queensland	1923	1917–1947
Hugh de Largie	Nationalist	Western Australia	1923	1901–1923
Edmund Drake-Brockman	Nationalist	Western Australia	1926	1920–1926
Walter Duncan	Nationalist	New South Wales	1926	1920–1931
John Earle	Nationalist	Tasmania	1923	1917–1923
Harold Elliott	Nationalist	Victoria	1926	1920–1931
George Fairbairn	Nationalist	Victoria	1923	1917–1923
Harry Foll	Nationalist	Queensland	1923	1917–1947
George Foster	Nationalist	Tasmania	1926	1920–1925
Albert Gardiner	Labor	New South Wales	1926	1910–1926, 1928
Henry Garling	Nationalist	New South Wales	1922	1921–1922
Thomas Givens	Nationalist	Queensland	1926	1904–1928
William Glasgow	Nationalist	Queensland	1926	1920–1932
James Guthrie	Nationalist	Victoria	1926	1920–1938
Robert Guthrie	Nationalist	South Australia	1923	1904–1921
George Henderson	Nationalist	Western Australia	1923	1904–1923
Bert Hoare	Labor	South Australia	1923	1922–1935
John Keating	Nationalist	Tasmania	1923	1901–1923
Patrick Lynch	Nationalist	Western Australia	1926	1907–1938
John MacDonald	Labor	Queensland	1922	1922, 1928, 1932–1937
Allan McDougall	Labor	New South Wales	1923	1910–1920, 1922–1924
Edward Millen	Nationalist	New South Wales	1923	1901–1923
John Millen	Nationalist	Tasmania	1926	1920–1938
John Newlands	Nationalist	South Australia	1926	1913–1932
Herbert Payne	Nationalist	Tasmania	1926	1920–1938
George Pearce	Nationalist	Western Australia	1926	1901–1938
William Plain	Nationalist	Victoria	1923	1917–1923, 1925–1938
Herbert Pratten	Nationalist	New South Wales	1923	1917–1921)
Matthew Reid	Nationalist	Queensland	1923	1917–1935
James Rowell	Nationalist	South Australia	1923	1917–1923
Edward Russell	Nationalist	Victoria	1926	1907–1925
William Senior	Nationalist	South Australia	1923	1913–1923
Josiah Thomas	Nationalist	New South Wales	1923	1917–1923, 1925–1929
William Thompson	Nationalist	Queensland	1926	1922–1932
Edward Vardon	Nationalist	South Australia	1922	1921–1922
Victor Wilson	Nationalist	South Australia	1926	1920–1926
