= Insincere voting =

Lying about which of two candidates is preferred

In political science, social choice, and game theory, insincere voting is the practice of casting a vote that provides more support to a worse outcome than a better one, i.e. one that involves voters lying about whether they prefer candidate A or B. It is sometimes called misaligned, deceptive, or dishonest voting. For example, in a first-past-the-post election, a sincere voter would support the candidate they think is best, whereas an insincere voter may instead support a different candidate. The design of many voting rules creates incentives for dishonesty among voters.

First-preference methods like first-past-the-post and ranked-choice runoff voting (RCV) have a strong tendency to force voters into supporting the lesser of two evils, i.e. lying about who their favorite candidate is. If a voter's most preferred candidate is unlikely to win the election, the voter is instead incentivized to support the "least bad" of the candidates they consider viable.

By contrast, systems that satisfy independence of irrelevant alternatives (such as score, approval, and highest medians) tend to exhibit very low rates of insincere voting, and can even satisfy the sincere favorite criterion (which means voters are never forced to choose between the lesser of two evils).

== See also ==
- Strategic voting
- Vote pairing
