= Edward Russell (trade unionist) =

Australian trade unionist

Edward Fitzgerald Russell (27 June 1867 – 14 August 1943) was an Australian trade unionist.

Born at Rocky Lead near Daylesford in Victoria to Irish-born teacher Henry Russell and Maria Louisa, née Doyle. Young Edward became a compositor, and on 24 October 1890 married Catherine McCoy at Dandenong. They moved to Port Melbourne in 1894; Russell continued as a compositor until 1899. He subsequently worked intermittently as a labourer, a candlemaker and a casual dockhand. He later worked as a "vat man" in a soap factory; the family struggled financially at this time. Russell was appointed secretary of the Victorian Agricultural Implement Makers' Society in August 1907 despite not working in this area; his membership of the Victorian Socialist Party is believed to have helped him get the position. He represented the society in the Commonwealth Court of Conciliation and Arbitration against Hugh Victor McKay in September 1907; his wife Kate was used by H. B. Higgins in his landmark Harvester Judgement as an example of struggling working-class women. After the High Court struck down the decision Russell and his union were once more in financial stress.

In January 1911 the union declared that all industry workers were required to join; McKay and the employers responded with a lockout and the use of free labour and Russell was forced to compromise for only small wage increases. His membership of the Labor Party was sporadic, contesting local elections in Port Melbourne as a revolutionary socialist in 1907, but he served as a Labor councillor for Port Melbourne from 1912 to 1914 (mayor in 1913). He contested East Gippsland in the 1911 state election and Echuca in the 1919 federal election and organised the anti-conscription campaign in South Australia in 1916–17. From 1918 to 1919 he was President of the Melbourne Trades Hall Council.

His union bankrupt, Russell kept a lower profile during the 1910s. He and the union returned to the arbitration court in 1925 to seek further wage increases, but their case was rejected. In 1926 an attempt to reduce work hours was also unsuccessful, and unemployment in the industry forced Russell to call for increased tariffs on machinery. The financial situation did not improve during the Depression, during which Russell's salary was £1 per week, and he resigned in February 1933. He and his son Roy, who had worked as an honorary assistant, claimed £500 in back payments; Roy addressed the union in 1936 claiming his father was destitute and threatening to go to the press and the union agreed to pay the debt in £1 instalments. Russell died in 1943 at Footscray.
