= Frederick Riley (trade unionist) =

Frederick John Riley (18 May 1886 – 2 April 1970) was an Australian political activist and trade unionist.

Riley was born at Stirling in South Australia to blacksmith Frederick Riley, an early Labor Party activist and local councillor, and Susannah, née Williams. He left school at twelve and worked as a labourer. During a period in Sydney he was involved in socialist circles with Harry Holland. He was imprisoned for a week at Wollongong in 1914 after ignoring a policeman's demand to stop addressing a free speech public meeting. He became secretary of the Australian Peace Alliance's Victorian council in 1916, and was often fined over involvement in brawls at anti-conscription demonstrations; on one occasion he received a fine after protecting female speakers, including Vida Goldstein, from off-duty soldiers.

A founding member and later secretary of the Y Club socialist discussion group, he participated in the 1919 Melbourne waterfront strike and helped negotiate a settlement. He married Alice Ann Warburton, née Large, on 27 April 1920 in a civil ceremony. In 1922 he was appointed secretary of the Manufacturing Grocers' Employees' Federation of Australia and became a highly successful union leader. From 1931 to 1932 he was President of the Trades Hall Council, and he served as president of the Victorian branch of the Australian Labor Party from 1941 to 1942. In 1942 he became an adviser to the Commonwealth prices commissioner. His wife had died in 1940, and on 17 July 1943 he married Annie Elliott Warn.

Riley was a member of the ALP's anti-communist right wing and was refused admission to the 1955 federal conference; despite his non-Catholicism he joined the Democratic Labor Party, of which he was Victorian president from 1960 to 1961, when he retired from public life. He died in 1970 at Reservoir.
