= William Kinsey Bolton =

Australian politician

William Bolton CBE, VD
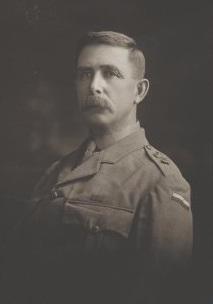
- Lieutenant Colonel William Bolton c.1917

Senator for Victoria
- In office 1 July 1917 – 30 June 1923

Personal details
- Born: 2 November 1861 Lostock Gralam, England
- Died: 8 September 1941 (aged 79) Brighton, Australia
- Party: Nationalist Party of Australia
- Occupation: Soldier

Military service
- Allegiance: Australia
- Branch/service: Citizens Military Force; Australian Imperial Force
- Years of service: 1878–1920
- Rank: Brigadier General
- Commands: 8th Battalion (1914–15); Queenscliff Fort (1914); 70th Regiment (1912–14)
- Battles/wars: First World War; Gallipoli campaign; Second Battle of Krithia
- Awards: Commander of the Order of the British Empire; Colonial Auxiliary Forces Officers' Decoration

Brigadier General William Kinsey Bolton (2 November 1861 – 8 September 1941) was an Australian soldier, politician and a founding member of the Returned Sailors and Soldiers Imperial League of Australia (RSSILA), forerunner of the present Returned and Services League of Australia. Bolton was commander of the 8th Battalion early on in the First World War, including during the landing and initial battles of the Gallipoli campaign. Bolton's Ridge on the right flank of Anzac Cove was named after him. He returned to Australia due to ill health in September 1915, was elected the inaugural National President of the RSSILA (1916–19), and served as a Nationalist Senator from Victoria from 1917 to 1923.

== Sources ==
- Lieutenant Colonel William Kinsey Bolton, CBE, VD
- Australian War Memorial
- The 2nd Brigade, awm.gov.au. Accessed 1 October 2022.
- Official Histories, awm.gov.au. Accessed 1 October 2022.
