= James Guthrie (Australian politician) =

Australian politician

James Guthrie CBE
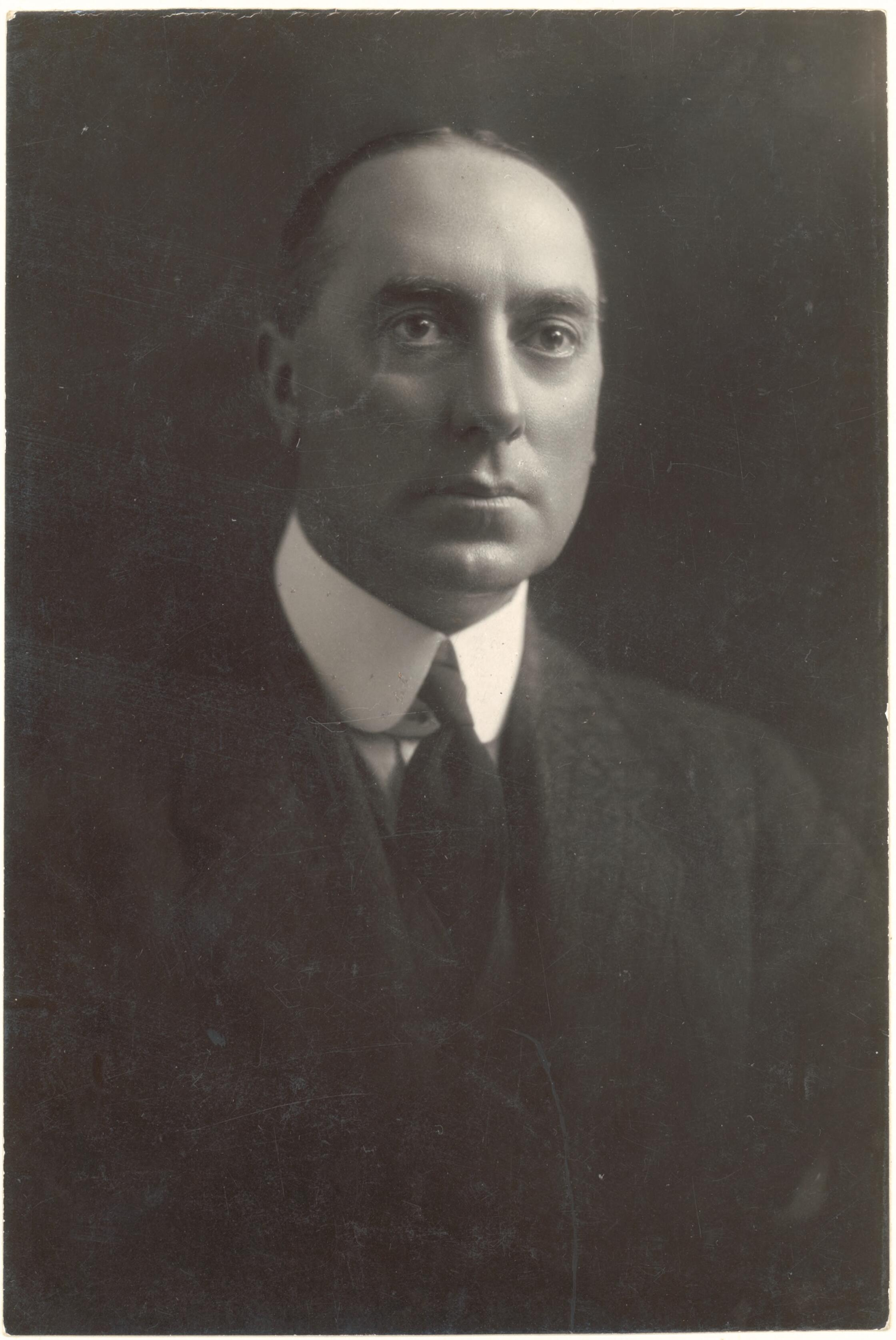

Senator for Victoria
- In office 1 July 1920 – 30 June 1938

Personal details
- Born: 13 September 1872 Rich Avon Station, Victoria
- Died: 18 August 1958 (aged 85) Kangaroo Ground, Victoria, Australia
- Party: Nationalist (1919–31); UAP (1931–38)
- Occupation: Grazier, woolbroker

James Francis Guthrie, CBE (13 September 1872 – 18 August 1958) was an Australian politician. Born at Rich Avon Station in Victoria, he was educated at Geelong College before becoming a grazier, sheep breeder and woolbroker. In 1919, he was elected to the Australian Senate as a Nationalist Senator for Victoria, he continued to work for Dalgerty and Company until 1928. Following this he served as adivser to their London board until his death. In 1931, together with the rest of his party, he joined the United Australia Party. In 1936 he helped establish the Australian Wool Board and served on its board until 1945. He held the seat until his defeat in 1937, taking effect in 1938.

Guthrie was made a Commander of the Order of the British Empire (CBE) in the 1946 New Year Honours. In his later years he wrote about the history of the wool industry, publishing A World History of Sheep and Wool in 1957. He died in 1958.
