= Edward Mulcahy (politician) =

Irish-born Australian politician

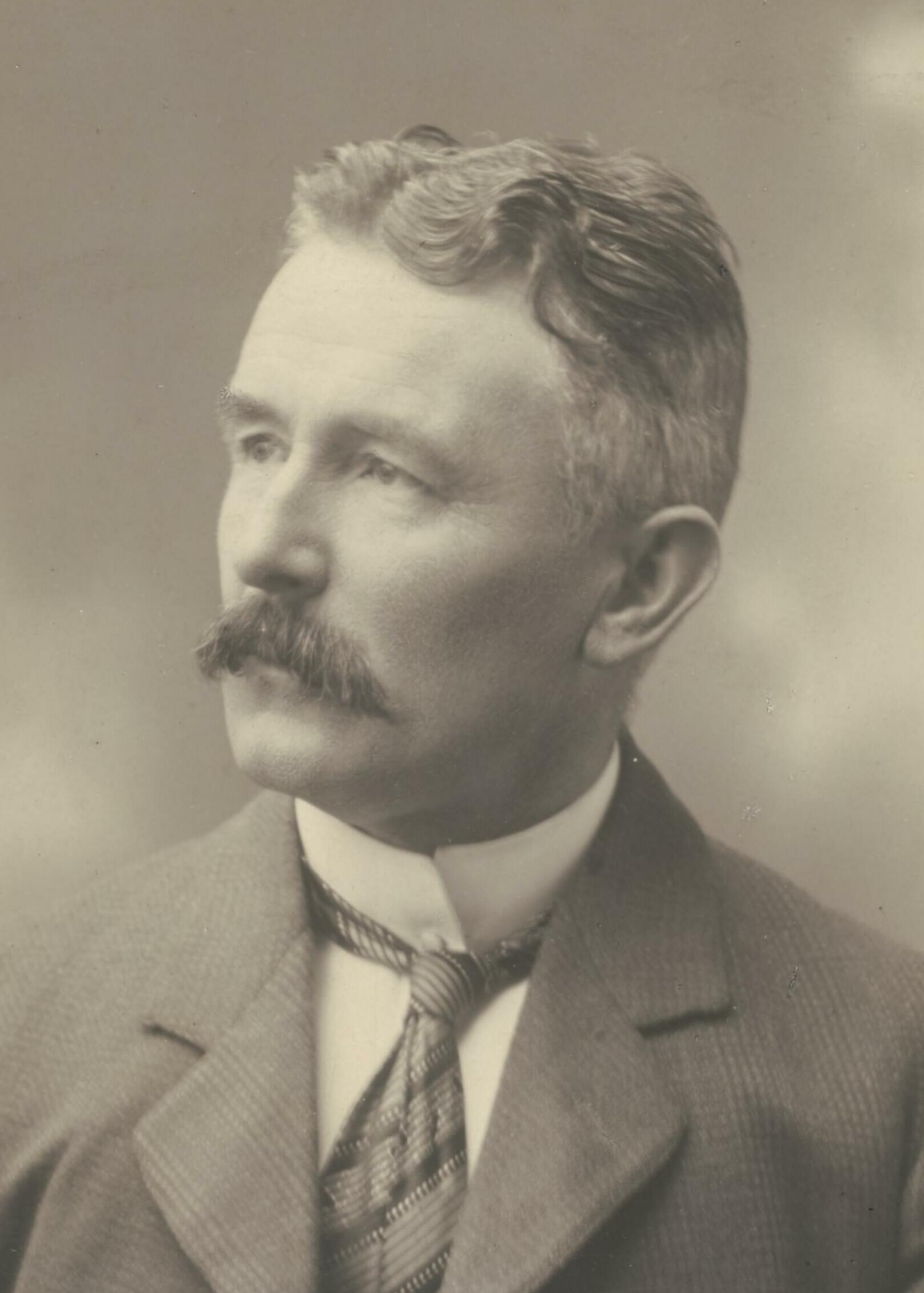

Senator for Tasmania
- In office 15 January 1919 – 30 June 1920
- Preceded by: James Long
- In office 1 January 1904 – 10 May 1910

Personal details
- Born: 28 March 1850 County Limerick, Ireland
- Died: 23 October 1927 (aged 77) Hobart, Tasmania, Australia
- Party: Protectionist (1904–09); Liberal (1909–17); Nationalist (1917–19)
- Children: Mary Bromwich (m. 1878; died 1890) Sarah Bromwich (m. 1893; died 1910) Rosie Winter (m. 1913)
- Occupation: Businessman

Edward Mulcahy (28 March 1850 – 23 October 1927) was an Irish-born Australian politician. Born in County Limerick, he migrated to Australia as a child and was educated in Tasmania. He became an apprentice compositor and established a soft goods business in Hobart. In 1891 he was elected to the Tasmanian House of Assembly for West Hobart, serving until 1903, including a period from 1899 to 1903 when he was Minister for Lands and Works and Minister for Mines. In 1904, he was elected to the Australian Senate as a Protectionist Senator for Tasmania. Defeated as a Liberal in 1910, he returned to the House of Assembly as the member for Wilmot, serving as Minister for Lands and Works, Minister for Mines and Minister for Railways 1912–1914. In 1919, he left the Assembly and was appointed to the Senate as a Nationalist, filling the vacancy caused by Labor Senator James Long's resignation. He retired in 1919.

== Personal life ==
Mulcahy married dressmaker Mary Ann Bromwich in 1878, but was widowed in 1890. He remarried in 1893 to his first wife's sister Sarah Jane Bromwich. He was widowed a second time in 1910, and married a third time in 1913 to Rosie Bernard Winter. He had six daughters and three sons from his three marriages, dying in Hobart on 23 October 1927 at the age of 77.
