= James Long (Australian politician) =

Australian politician (1870–1932)

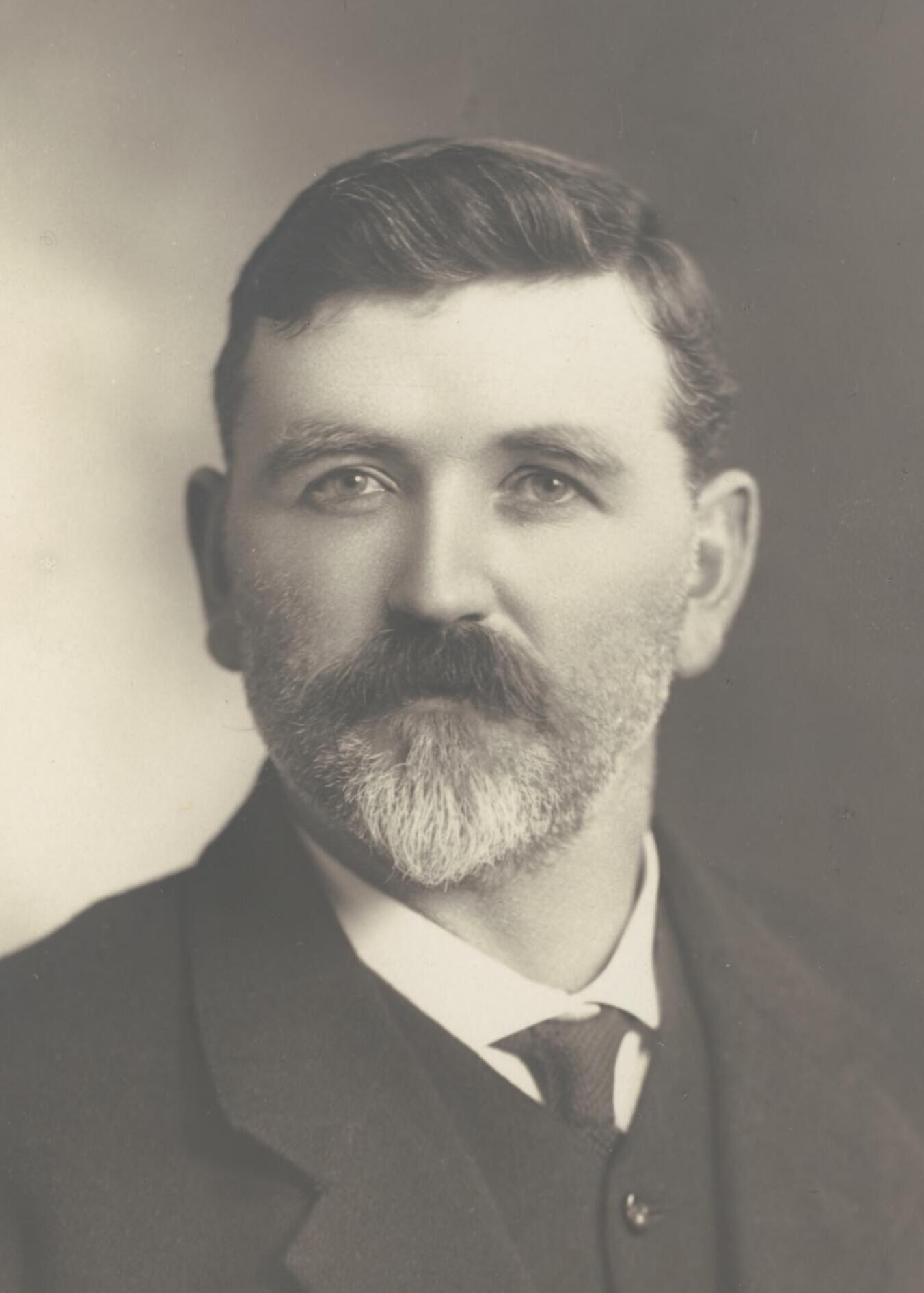

Senator for Tasmania
- In office 1 July 1910 – 20 December 1918
- Succeeded by: Edward Mulcahy

Personal details
- Born: 1870 Hamilton-on-Forth, Tasmania
- Died: 23 December 1932 (aged 61–62) Prahran, Victoria, Australia
- Party: Labor
- Spouse: Rebecca Turnbull (m. 1893)
- Occupation: Miner

James Joseph Long (1870 – 23 December 1932) was an Australian politician. He was a Senator for Tasmania from 1910 to 1918, representing the Australian Labor Party (ALP). He resigned from the Senate following a royal commission's finding that he had accepted bribes, although he was never charged with a criminal offence. Long previously served in the Tasmanian House of Assembly from 1903 to 1910 and was briefly a state government minister. He was a miner and trade union official before entering parliament.

== Early life ==
Long was born in 1870 in Hamilton-on-Forth, Tasmania. He was the son of Maria (née Hannan) and Patrick Long; his father was a farmer.

Long received a primary school education, moving to Tasmania's West Coast at a young age. He initially worked as a prospector and later as a miner, including for the Mount Lyell Mining and Railway Company. He became active in the labour movement as a member of the Amalgamated Miners' Association and was an officeholder in its Mount Lyell branch.

== State politics ==
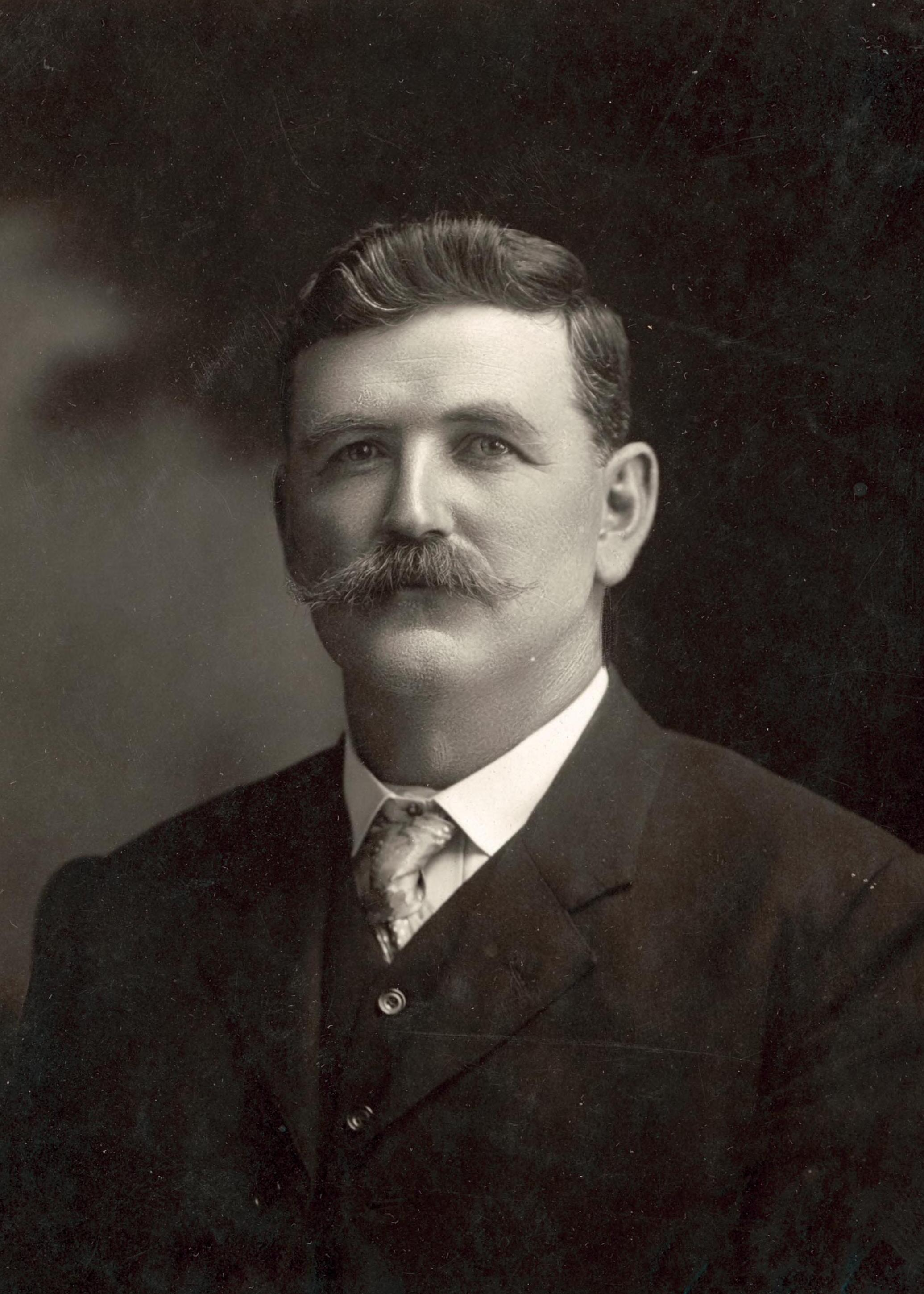
Undated photo

Long was a founding member of the Tasmanian Workers' Political League in 1903, attending the league's first conference as a delegate from Mount Lyell. He was elected to the Tasmanian House of Assembly at the 1903 Tasmanian state election, winning the seat of Lyell as one of the first Labor MPs in Tasmania.

As members of parliament did not receive a full-time salary at the time, Long initially continued to work as a miner following his election to parliament. He was subsequently dismissed by Mount Lyell's general manager Robert Sticht and blacklisted from the local mining industry, with Sticht describing him as "an undesirable character of bad repute".

Long was appointed to the Tasmanian royal commission into wages and wage earners in 1906, where he advocated for a fair day's wage for a fair day's work. He subsequently moved a motion in the House of Assembly calling on the government to institute minimum wage and maximum work week legislation, which was defeated by two votes. Long briefly served as a minister in John Earle's government in 1909, holding the lands, works, mines and agriculture portfolios for a period of one week before the government's defeat. He moved to the new multi-member seat of Darwin at the 1909 state election, resigning on 28 February 1910 to stand for the Senate.

== Federal politics ==
Long was elected to a six-year Senate term at the 1910 federal election. His first term ended following a double dissolution in 1914, but he was re-elected to a further six-year term at the 1914 election.

In parliament, Long supported the ALP platform and spoke frequently on Tasmanian matters. He opposed overseas conscription and remained with the ALP following the 1916 party split, which saw the expulsion of Prime Minister Billy Hughes and his supporters from the party. Long nonetheless accepted an offer from Hughes in February 1917 to conduct a trade mission to the Dutch East Indies. His appointment was widely seen as an attempt by Hughes to shore up his numbers in the Senate, in line with his apparent role in engineering the retirement of Long's ALP colleague Rudolph Ready.

=== Corruption allegations and resignation ===
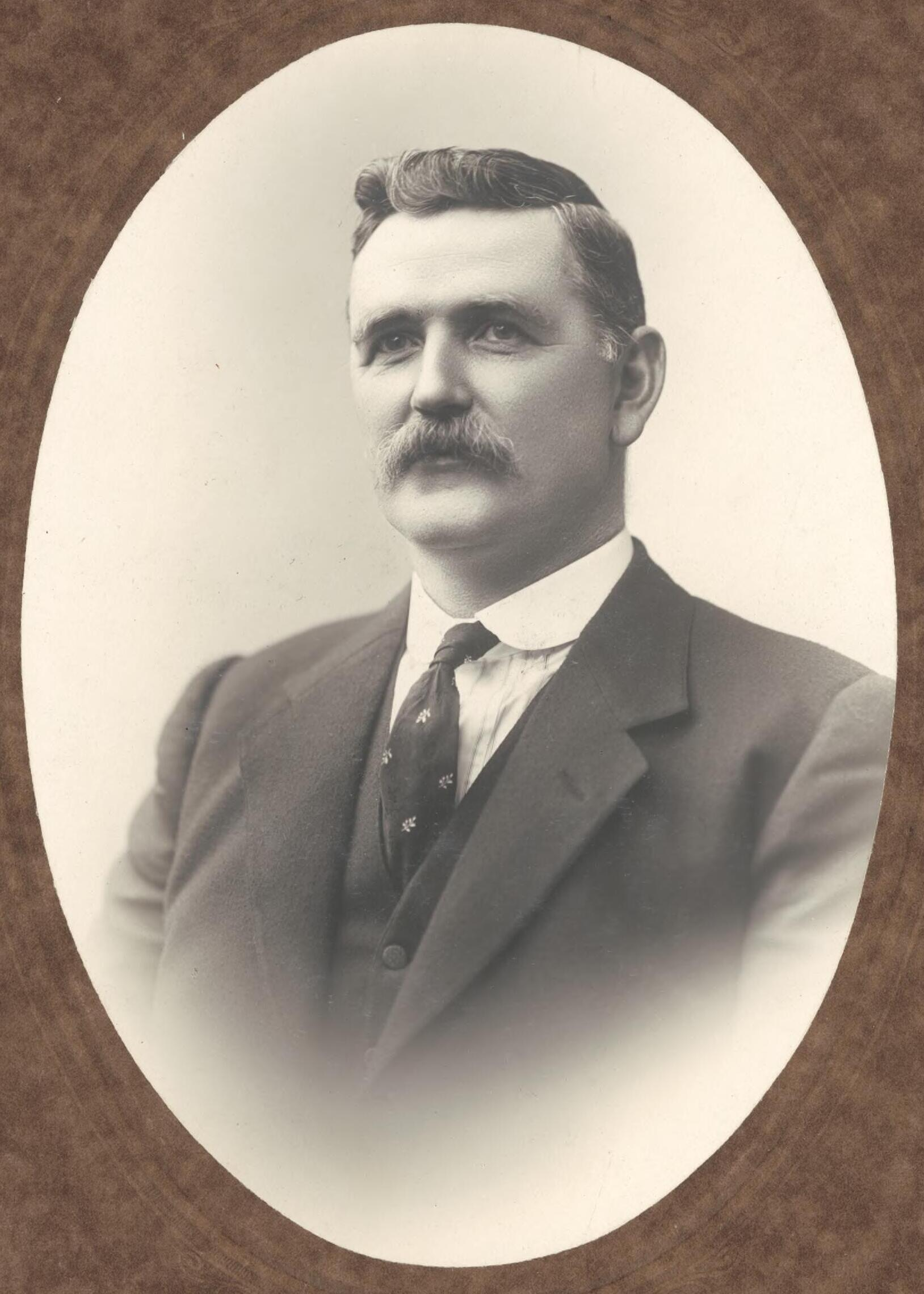
Portrait by VanDyck Studios in Launceston

Long developed a friendship with Catholic priest and radio pioneer Father Archibald Shaw. Long's son was an apprentice at Shaw's factory in Sydney and the two shared an interest in horse racing. In 1916, Long helped facilitate the sale of Shaw's factory to the federal government via navy minister Jens Jensen for £55,000 (equivalent to $6,000,000 in 2022).

Shaw died later in 1916 and allegations were soon made of financial improprieties in relation to the sale, with a significant sum of cash unaccounted for. In 1918, a royal commission into defence administration during World War I found that Long had accepted a bribe of £2,400 (equivalent to $240,000 in 2022) for his role in facilitating the sale. Long admitted only to receiving £1,290 (equivalent to $130,000 in 2022), which he stated were for "services rendered", and claimed that other payments from Shaw were winnings from horse racing.

Long resigned from the Senate on 20 December 1918, stating that the royal commission's findings "though unsupported by evidence, have been accepted with as little hesitation by the members of my own party as by those on the Government side of the House". The scandal also brought about the end of Jensen's ministerial career, although no evidence was found that he had taken bribes. The federal government opted not to proceed with criminal charges against Long after his resignation.

== Personal life ==
In 1893, Long married Rebecca Turnbull, with whom he had five sons and three daughters. One of his sons was killed in World War I.

After resigning from the Senate, Long managed hotels in Wonthaggi, Victoria, and Temora, New South Wales, for periods. He experienced poor health in his final years and retired to Melbourne. He died at his home in Prahran on 23 December 1932.
