= Electoral results for the Division of Gippsland =

Australian division election results

This is a list of electoral results for the Division of Gippsland in Australian federal elections from the division's creation in 1901 until the present.

== Members ==
Member	Party	Term
Allan McLean	Protectionist	1901–1906
George Wise	Protectionist	1906–1909
George Wise	Independent Liberal	1909–1913
James Bennett	Liberal	1913–1914
George Wise	Independent Labor	1914–1917
George Wise	Nationalist	1917–1922
Thomas Paterson	Country	1922–1943
George Bowden	Country	1943–1961
Peter Nixon	Country/National Country/National	1961–1983
Peter McGauran	National	1983–2008
Darren Chester	National	2008–present

== Election results ==
=== Elections in the 2020s ===
==== 2025 ====
2025 Australian federal election: Gippsland
Party	Candidate	Votes	%	±%
National	Darren Chester	54,916	52.56	−1.58
Labor	Sonny Stephens	22,218	21.27	+2.04
One Nation	Gregory Hansford	15,074	14.43	+5.07
Greens	Rochelle Hine	8,854	8.47	+0.00
Libertarian	Simon Wilson	3,412	3.27	+3.27
Total formal votes		104,474	96.41	−0.63
Informal votes		3,891	3.59	+0.63
Turnout		108,365	91.75	+3.39
Two-party-preferred result
National	Darren Chester	72,522	69.42	−1.15
Labor	Sonny Stephens	31,952	30.58	+1.15
National hold		Swing	−1.15	

Results are not final. Last updated on 19 May 2025 at 12:30 PM AEST.

==== 2022 ====
2022 Australian federal election: Gippsland
Party	Candidate	Votes	%	±%
National	Darren Chester	54,635	54.14	+0.14
Labor	Jannette Langley	19,404	19.23	−3.97
One Nation	Greg Hansford	9,443	9.36	+9.36
Greens	Marjorie Thorpe	8,545	8.47	+2.43
United Australia	Gregory Forster	4,593	4.55	+0.15
Liberal Democrats	Jim McDonald	4,286	4.25	+4.25
Total formal votes		100,906	97.04	+2.26
Informal votes		3,073	2.96	−2.26
Turnout		103,979	90.89	−1.49
Two-party-preferred result
National	Darren Chester	71,205	70.57	+3.90
Labor	Jannette Langley	29,701	29.43	−3.90
National hold		Swing	+3.90	

Alluvial diagram for preference flows in the seat of Gippsland in the 2022 federal election. The winning candidate got over 50% of first preference votes, so this alluvial diagram is indicative only, and preference flows were not used to determine the final result. The preference flows were used to determine the two-candidate-preferred.

=== Elections in the 2010s ===
==== 2019 ====
2019 Australian federal election: Gippsland
Party	Candidate	Votes	%	±%
National	Darren Chester	52,202	54.00	−1.84
Labor	Antoinette Holm	22,426	23.20	+2.99
Shooters, Fishers, Farmers	David Snelling	6,872	7.11	+7.11
Greens	Deb Foskey	5,835	6.04	−1.79
United Australia	Kerri Brewer	4,257	4.40	+4.40
Independent	Sonia Buckley	3,043	3.15	+3.15
Conservative National	Neville Tickner	2,043	2.11	+2.11
Total formal votes		96,678	94.78	+1.64
Informal votes		5,320	5.22	−1.64
Turnout		101,998	92.27	−0.58
Two-party-preferred result
National	Darren Chester	64,456	66.67	−1.54
Labor	Antoinette Holm	32,222	33.33	+1.54
National hold		Swing	−1.54	

==== 2016 ====
2016 Australian federal election: Gippsland
Party	Candidate	Votes	%	±%
National	Darren Chester	50,309	56.34	+2.58
Labor	Shashi Bhatti	17,870	20.01	−3.14
Greens	Ian Onley	7,002	7.84	+2.14
Liberal Democrats	Ben Buckley	4,444	4.98	−0.35
Family First	Brian Heath	3,068	3.44	+1.64
Independent	Cherie Smith	1,577	1.77	+1.77
Rise Up Australia	Peter Dorian	1,513	1.69	+1.27
Renewable Energy	Peter Gardner	1,384	1.55	+1.55
Independent	Christine Sindt	1,379	1.54	+1.54
Christians	Ashleigh Belsar	746	0.84	+0.84
Total formal votes		89,292	93.13	−0.88
Informal votes		6,588	6.87	+0.88
Turnout		95,880	92.11	−2.34
Two-party-preferred result
National	Darren Chester	61,106	68.43	+2.59
Labor	Shashi Bhatti	28,186	31.57	−2.59
National hold		Swing	+2.59	

==== 2013 ====
2013 Australian federal election: Gippsland
Party	Candidate	Votes	%	±%
National	Darren Chester	47,533	53.76	+0.76
Labor	Jeff McNeill	20,467	23.15	−8.42
Greens	Scott Campbell-Smith	5,039	5.70	−0.87
Liberal Democrats	Ben Buckley	4,716	5.33	−0.19
Palmer United	Deborah Gravenall	3,785	4.28	+4.28
Sex Party	Douglas Leitch	2,101	2.38	+2.38
Independent	Peter Gardner	1,992	2.25	+2.25
Family First	Angie Foster	1,591	1.80	−1.54
Country Alliance	Sav Mangion	623	0.70	+0.70
Rise Up Australia	Peter Dorian	367	0.42	+0.42
Secular	Mark Guerin	201	0.23	+0.23
Total formal votes		88,415	94.01	−2.20
Informal votes		5,629	5.99	+2.20
Turnout		94,044	94.49	+0.24
Two-party-preferred result
National	Darren Chester	58,214	65.84	+4.39
Labor	Jeff McNeill	30,201	34.16	−4.39
National hold		Swing	+4.39	

==== 2010 ====
2010 Australian federal election: Gippsland
Party	Candidate	Votes	%	±%
National	Darren Chester	47,020	53.00	+4.63
Labor	Darren McCubbin	28,008	31.57	−4.98
Greens	Michael Bond	5,826	6.57	+1.03
Liberal Democrats	Ben Buckley	4,895	5.52	+5.52
Family First	Heath Jefferis	2,963	3.34	−0.97
Total formal votes		88,712	96.21	−0.81
Informal votes		3,496	3.79	+0.81
Total votes		92,208	94.53	−1.14
Two-party-preferred result
National	Darren Chester	54,513	61.45	+5.54
Labor	Darren McCubbin	34,199	38.55	−5.54
National hold		Swing	+5.54	

=== Elections in the 2000s ===
2008 Gippsland by-election
Party	Candidate	Votes	%	±%
National	Darren Chester	32,971	39.60	−8.77
Labor	Darren McCubbin	23,652	28.41	−8.14
Liberal	Rohan Fitzgerald	17,249	20.72	+20.72
Greens	Malcolm McKelvie	5,862	7.04	+1.50
Liberty & Democracy	Ben Buckley	3,518	4.23	+4.23
Total formal votes		83,252	97.12	+0.10
Informal votes		2,465	2.88	−0.10
Total votes		85,717	89.68	-5.98
Two-party-preferred result
National	Darren Chester	51,611	61.99	+6.08
Labor	Darren McCubbin	31,641	38.01	−6.08
National hold		Swing	+6.08	

==== 2007 ====
2007 Australian federal election: Gippsland
Party	Candidate	Votes	%	±%
National	Peter McGauran	42,632	48.37	−0.36
Labor	Jane Rowe	32,214	36.55	+2.46
Greens	Jeff Wrathall	4,881	5.54	+1.16
Family First	Michael Rowell	3,802	4.31	+1.49
Independent	Ben Buckley	2,787	3.16	+3.16
What Women Want	Helen McAdam	1,825	2.07	+2.07
Total formal votes		88,141	97.02	+1.25
Informal votes		2,710	2.98	−1.25
Turnout		90,851	95.75	+0.12
Two-party-preferred result
National	Peter McGauran	49,280	55.91	−1.79
Labor	Jane Rowe	38,861	44.09	+1.79
National hold		Swing	−1.79	

==== 2004 ====
2004 Australian federal election: Gippsland
Party	Candidate	Votes	%	±%
National	Peter McGauran	41,531	48.73	+19.00
Labor	Don Wishart	29,053	34.09	+0.23
Greens	Madelon Lane	3,734	4.38	+0.46
Independent	Peter Maxwell Kelly	3,139	3.68	+3.68
One Nation	Ben Buckley	2,539	2.98	−1.96
Family First	Doug Lillyman	2,405	2.82	+2.82
Democrats	David Leonard Langmore	1,312	1.54	−2.95
	Christina Sindt	1,288	1.51	+1.51
Citizens Electoral Council	Heather Stanton	233	0.27	+0.06
Total formal votes		85,234	95.77	+0.53
Informal votes		3,763	4.23	−0.53
Turnout		88,997	95.63	+0.00
Two-party-preferred result
National	Peter McGauran	49,181	57.70	+5.12
Labor	Don Wishart	36,053	42.30	−5.12
National hold		Swing	+5.12	

==== 2001 ====
2001 Australian federal election: Gippsland
Party	Candidate	Votes	%	±%
National	Peter McGauran	34,555	45.62	+2.65
Labor	Bill Bolitho	19,469	25.70	−0.58
Independent	Doug Treasure	4,249	5.61	+0.10
Greens	Chris Aitken	4,205	5.55	+5.55
One Nation	Michael Freshwater	4,066	5.37	−6.06
Democrats	Jo McCubbin	3,331	4.40	−0.92
Independent	John Jago	1,579	2.08	+2.08
Independent	Phillip Evans	1,551	2.05	+2.05
Independent	Ben Buckley	1,249	1.65	+1.65
Independent	Marjorie Thorpe	791	1.04	+1.04
Independent	Phillip Robinson	487	0.64	+0.64
Citizens Electoral Council	Frank Williams	221	0.29	+0.29
Total formal votes		75,753	94.41	−0.66
Informal votes		4,484	5.59	+0.66
Turnout		80,237	96.02	
Two-party-preferred result
National	Peter McGauran	43,978	58.02	−0.81
Labor	Bill Bolitho	31,775	41.96	+0.81
National hold		Swing	−0.81	

=== Elections in the 1990s ===
==== 1998 ====
1998 Australian federal election: Gippsland
Party	Candidate	Votes	%	±%
National	Peter McGauran	31,774	42.97	−18.24
Labor	Judith Stone	19,438	26.28	+0.30
One Nation	Tony Peters	8,454	11.43	+11.43
Independent	Doug Treasure	4,076	5.51	+5.51
Democrats	Jo McCubbin	3,931	5.32	−2.09
Independent	Leonie Cameron	2,611	3.53	+3.53
Independent	Jack Vanderland	900	1.22	+1.22
Independent	Les Horsfield	799	1.08	+1.08
Natural Law	Frances Clarke	751	1.02	+0.36
Australia First	John Weatherhead	650	0.88	+0.88
Unity	Robert Thorpe	567	0.77	+0.77
Total formal votes		73,951	95.08	−2.37
Informal votes		3,829	4.92	+2.37
Turnout		77,780	95.98	−0.92
Two-party-preferred result
National	Peter McGauran	43,506	58.83	−9.81
Labor	Judith Stone	30,445	41.17	+9.81
National hold		Swing	−9.81	

==== 1996 ====
1996 Australian federal election: Gippsland
Party	Candidate	Votes	%	±%
National	Peter McGauran	46,180	61.21	+4.83
Labor	Judith Stone	19,604	25.98	−4.34
Democrats	John Brownstein	5,584	7.40	+4.63
Independent	Ben Buckley	3,582	4.75	+4.83
Natural Law	Jamie Pollock	495	0.66	−0.07
Total formal votes		75,445	97.45	−0.47
Informal votes		1,974	2.55	+0.47
Turnout		77,419	96.90	+0.57
Two-party-preferred result
National	Peter McGauran	51,400	68.64	+2.80
Labor	Judith Stone	23,486	31.36	−2.80
National hold		Swing	+2.80	

==== 1993 ====
1993 Australian federal election: Gippsland
Party	Candidate	Votes	%	±%
National	Peter McGauran	43,773	60.54	−0.15
Labor	Judith Stone	21,209	29.33	+6.37
Independent	Ben Buckley	3,049	4.22	+0.76
Democrats	Donal Storey	2,105	2.91	−7.53
	Bruce Phillips	1,720	2.38	+2.38
Natural Law	Paul Van Baer	445	0.62	+0.62
Total formal votes		72,301	97.97	+0.28
Informal votes		1,495	2.03	−0.28
Turnout		73,796	96.33	
Two-party-preferred result
National	Peter McGauran	47,886	66.30	−2.64
Labor	Judith Stone	24,345	33.70	+2.64
National hold		Swing	−2.64	

==== 1990 ====
1990 Australian federal election: Gippsland
Party	Candidate	Votes	%	±%
National	Peter McGauran	41,862	60.7	+16.4
Labor	Merv Bundle	15,841	23.0	−7.5
Democrats	Grace McCaughey	7,201	10.4	+6.2
Independent	Ben Buckley	2,382	3.5	+3.5
Call to Australia	Robert Watson	1,684	2.4	+2.4
Total formal votes		68,970	97.7	
Informal votes		1,631	2.3	
Turnout		70,601	95.7	
Two-party-preferred result
National	Peter McGauran	47,507	68.9	+3.9
Labor	Merv Bundle	21,406	31.1	−3.9
National hold		Swing	+3.9	

=== Elections in the 1980s ===
==== 1987 ====
1987 Australian federal election: Gippsland
Party	Candidate	Votes	%	±%
National	Peter McGauran	29,084	44.3	+3.5
Labor	Zona Child	20,056	30.5	+1.7
Liberal	Grant Pearce	12,384	18.9	−0.8
Democrats	Pierre Forcier	2,785	4.2	+1.2
Independent	Rod Anderson	1,350	2.1	+2.1
Total formal votes		65,659	96.6	
Informal votes		2,294	3.4	
Turnout		67,953	95.3	
Two-party-preferred result
National	Peter McGauran	42,687	65.0	+0.7
Labor	Zona Child	22,958	35.0	−0.7
National hold		Swing	+0.7	

==== 1984 ====
1984 Australian federal election: Gippsland
Party	Candidate	Votes	%	±%
National	Peter McGauran	24,818	40.8	+8.9
Labor	Bill de Vink	17,522	28.8	−6.2
Liberal	Rod Conley	11,984	19.7	−4.1
Nuclear Disarmament	Peter Gardner	2,702	4.4	+4.4
Democrats	Wilma Western	1,808	3.0	−1.0
Independent	Ben Buckley	1,176	1.9	+1.9
Democratic Labor	Margaret Handley	789	1.3	+1.3
Total formal votes		60,799	94.0	
Informal votes		3,898	6.0	
Turnout		64,697	95.1	
Two-party-preferred result
National	Peter McGauran	39,056	64.3	+4.2
Labor	Bill De Vink	21,692	35.7	−4.2
National hold		Swing	+4.2	

==== 1983 ====
1983 Australian federal election: Gippsland
Party	Candidate	Votes	%	±%
Labor	Anthony Petersen	24,029	35.4	+5.2
National	Peter McGauran	21,360	31.5	−25.2
Liberal	Philip Davis	16,127	23.8	+23.8
Democrats	Pierre Forcier	2,930	4.3	−6.2
Independent	Pearce Buckley	2,059	3.0	+3.0
Democratic Labor	Stewart Taig	659	1.0	+1.0
Independent	Bruce Ingle	652	1.0	+1.0
Total formal votes		67,816	96.8	
Informal votes		2,257	3.2	
Turnout		70,073	95.4	
Two-party-preferred result
National	Peter McGauran	40,465	59.7	−2.2
Labor	Anthony Petersen	27,351	40.3	+2.2
National hold		Swing	−2.2	

==== 1980 ====
1980 Australian federal election: Gippsland
Party	Candidate	Votes	%	±%
National Country	Peter Nixon	37,180	56.7	−1.3
Labor	Graeme McIntyre	19,791	30.2	+6.5
Democrats	Pierre Forcier	6,861	10.5	+0.1
Independent	Bruce Ingle	1,684	2.6	+2.6
Total formal votes		65,516	97.9	
Informal votes		1,385	2.1	
Turnout		66,901	95.1	
Two-party-preferred result
National Country	Peter Nixon		61.9	−2.6
Labor	Graeme McIntyre		38.1	+2.6
National Country hold		Swing	−2.6	

=== Elections in the 1970s ===
==== 1977 ====
1977 Australian federal election: Gippsland
Party	Candidate	Votes	%	±%
National Country	Peter Nixon	35,778	58.0	−6.7
Labor	William Switzer	14,634	23.7	−4.9
Democrats	Thomas Reid	6,424	10.4	+10.4
Democratic Labor	Robert McMahon	3,003	4.9	−1.9
Independent	Bruce Ingle	1,884	3.1	+3.1
Total formal votes		61,723	97.6	
Informal votes		1,501	2.4	
Turnout		63,224	95.8	
Two-party-preferred result
National Country	Peter Nixon		69.7	−1.2
Labor	William Switzer		30.3	+1.2
National Country hold		Swing	−1.2	

==== 1975 ====
1975 Australian federal election: Gippsland
Party	Candidate	Votes	%	±%
National Country	Peter Nixon	36,806	64.7	+5.2
Labor	Peter Turner	16,274	28.6	−3.4
Democratic Labor	Robert McMahon	3,849	6.8	+2.2
Total formal votes		56,929	98.2	
Informal votes		1,018	1.8	
Turnout		57,947	95.9	
Two-party-preferred result
National Country	Peter Nixon		70.9	+5.1
Labor	Peter Turner		29.1	−5.1
National Country hold		Swing	+5.1	

==== 1974 ====
1974 Australian federal election: Gippsland
Party	Candidate	Votes	%	±%
Country	Peter Nixon	32,484	59.5	+6.4
Labor	Hugh Oakes	17,456	32.0	−1.9
Democratic Labor	John Condon	2,533	4.6	−3.3
Australia	John Bowron	2,123	3.9	−1.3
Total formal votes		54,596	98.4	
Informal votes		899	1.6	
Turnout		55,495	96.0	
Two-party-preferred result
Country	Peter Nixon		65.8	+2.9
Labor	Hugh Oakes		34.2	−2.9
Country hold		Swing	+2.9	

==== 1972 ====
1972 Australian federal election: Gippsland
Party	Candidate	Votes	%	±%
Country	Peter Nixon	26,007	53.1	−5.7
Labor	Peter Turner	16,591	33.9	+4.6
Democratic Labor	John Condon	3,869	7.9	−4.0
Australia	John Bowron	2,541	5.2	+5.2
Total formal votes		49,008	98.4	
Informal votes		775	1.6	
Turnout		49,783	96.4	
Two-party-preferred result
Country	Peter Nixon		62.9	−6.7
Labor	Peter Turner		37.1	+6.7
Country hold		Swing	−6.7	

=== Elections in the 1960s ===
==== 1969 ====
1969 Australian federal election: Gippsland
Party	Candidate	Votes	%	±%
Country	Peter Nixon	27,068	58.8	−5.3
Labor	John Wolfe	13,457	29.3	+7.8
Democratic Labor	John Hansen	5,478	11.9	−2.6
Total formal votes		46,003	98.0	
Informal votes		917	2.0	
Turnout		46,920	96.0	
Two-party-preferred result
Country	Peter Nixon		69.6	−7.7
Labor	John Wolfe		30.4	+7.7
Country hold		Swing	−7.7	

==== 1966 ====
1966 Australian federal election: Gippsland
Party	Candidate	Votes	%	±%
Country	Peter Nixon	28,627	64.3	+6.5
Labor	Thomas Powell	9,478	21.3	−9.7
Democratic Labor	John Hansen	6,439	14.5	+3.2
Total formal votes		44,544	97.6	
Informal votes		1,090	2.4	
Turnout		45,634	95.7	
Two-party-preferred result
Country	Peter Nixon		77.5	+9.5
Labor	Thomas Powell		22.5	−9.5
Country hold		Swing	+9.5	

==== 1963 ====
1963 Australian federal election: Gippsland
Party	Candidate	Votes	%	±%
Country	Peter Nixon	25,422	57.8	+6.2
Labor	Sydney Evans	13,623	31.0	−0.5
Democratic Labor	John Hansen	4,970	11.3	−5.6
Total formal votes		44,015	99.0	
Informal votes		452	1.0	
Turnout		44,467	95.8	
Two-party-preferred result
Country	Peter Nixon		68.0	+1.1
Labor	Sydney Evans		32.0	−1.1
Country hold		Swing	+1.1	

==== 1961 ====
1961 Australian federal election: Gippsland
Party	Candidate	Votes	%	±%
Country	Peter Nixon	22,002	51.6	−6.7
Labor	William Stephenson	13,430	31.5	+4.0
Democratic Labor	John Hansen	7,209	16.9	+2.8
Total formal votes		42,641	98.5	
Informal votes		671	1.5	
Turnout		43,312	95.3	
Two-party-preferred result
Country	Peter Nixon		66.9	−4.1
Labor	William Stephenson		33.1	+4.1
Country hold		Swing	−4.1	

=== Elections in the 1950s ===
==== 1958 ====
1958 Australian federal election: Gippsland
Party	Candidate	Votes	%	±%
Country	George Bowden	23,869	58.3	−4.3
Labor	Clement Little	11,258	27.5	+2.8
Democratic Labor	John Hansen	5,785	14.1	+1.4
Total formal votes		40,912	98.1	
Informal votes		810	1.9	
Turnout		41,722	95.7	
Two-party-preferred result
Country	George Bowden		71.0	−2.0
Labor	Clement Little		29.0	+2.0
Country hold		Swing	−2.0	

==== 1955 ====
1955 Australian federal election: Gippsland
Party	Candidate	Votes	%	±%
Country	George Bowden	24,382	62.6	+2.9
Labor	Clement Little	9,631	24.7	−15.6
Labor (A-C)	Frank Burns	4,951	12.7	+12.7
Total formal votes		38,964	98.0	
Informal votes		785	2.0	
Turnout		39,749	95.2	
Two-party-preferred result
Country	George Bowden		73.0	+13.3
Labor	Clement Little		27.0	−13.3
Country hold		Swing	+13.3	

==== 1954 ====
1954 Australian federal election: Gippsland
Party	Candidate	Votes	%	±%
Country	George Bowden	22,185	60.4	−4.7
Labor	Syd Crofts	14,537	39.6	+4.7
Total formal votes		36,722	99.0	
Informal votes		375	1.0	
Turnout		37,097	95.4	
Country hold		Swing	−4.7	

==== 1951 ====
1951 Australian federal election: Gippsland
Party	Candidate	Votes	%	±%
Country	George Bowden	22,799	65.1	−1.6
Labor	Victor Fitzgerald	12,247	34.9	+1.6
Total formal votes		35,046	98.5	
Informal votes		521	1.5	
Turnout		35,567	95.9	
Country hold		Swing	−1.6	

=== Elections in the 1940s ===
==== 1949 ====
1949 Australian federal election: Gippsland
Party	Candidate	Votes	%	±%
Country	George Bowden	22,824	66.7	+6.6
Labor	Horace Hawkins	11,373	33.3	−2.4
Total formal votes		34,197	98.6	
Informal votes		472	1.4	
Turnout		34,669	96.2	
Country hold		Swing	+4.6	

==== 1946 ====
1946 Australian federal election: Gippsland
Party	Candidate	Votes	%	±%
Country	George Bowden	28,526	55.2	+18.7
Labor	Adam Keltie	20,196	39.1	−6.0
Communist	Wally Williames	2,994	5.8	+5.8
Total formal votes		51,716	98.4	
Informal votes		824	1.6	
Turnout		52,540	94.6	
Two-party-preferred result
Country	George Bowden		55.8	+3.4
Labor	Adam Keltie		44.2	−3.4
Country hold		Swing	+3.4	

==== 1943 ====
1943 Australian federal election: Gippsland
Party	Candidate	Votes	%	±%
Labor	Wally Williames	22,358	45.1	+11.6
Country	George Bowden	18,104	36.5	−23.0
Services and Citizens	Herbert Birch	5,313	10.7	+10.7
Independent Democrat	Stephen Ashton	2,734	5.5	+5.5
One Parliament	Melvyn Morgan	1,119	2.3	+2.3
Total formal votes		49,628	97.9	
Informal votes		1,084	2.1	
Turnout		50,712	97.4	
Two-party-preferred result
Country	George Bowden	25,985	52.4	−4.3
Labor	Wally Williames	23,643	47.6	+4.3
Country hold		Swing	−4.3	

==== 1940 ====
1940 Australian federal election: Gippsland
Party	Candidate	Votes	%	±%
Country	Thomas Paterson	20,547	42.8	−1.6
Labor	James McKenna	16,082	33.5	−5.4
Country	George Bowden	8,006	16.7	+16.7
Independent	Calvert Wyeth	3,402	7.1	+7.1
Total formal votes		48,037	98.5	
Informal votes		708	1.5	
Turnout		48,745	96.0	
Two-party-preferred result
Country	Thomas Paterson	27,257	56.7	−4.4
Labor	James McKenna	20,780	43.3	+4.4
Country hold		Swing	−4.4	

=== Elections in the 1930s ===
==== 1937 ====
1937 Australian federal election: Gippsland
Party	Candidate	Votes	%	±%
Country	Thomas Paterson	29,069	61.1	
Labor	James McKenna	18,483	38.9	
Total formal votes		47,552	98.4	
Informal votes		765	1.6	
Turnout		48,317	96.2	
Country hold		Swing		

==== 1934 ====
1934 Australian federal election: Gippsland
Party	Candidate	Votes	%	±%
Country	Thomas Paterson	32,765	69.3	−30.7
Labor	Reg Pollard	14,489	30.7	+30.7
Total formal votes		47,254	98.3	
Informal votes		828	1.7	
Turnout		48,082	94.8	
Country hold		Swing	−30.7	

==== 1931 ====
1931 Australian federal election: Gippsland
Party	Candidate	Votes	%	±%
Country	Thomas Paterson	unopposed		
Country hold		Swing		

=== Elections in the 1920s ===
==== 1929 ====
1929 Australian federal election: Gippsland
Party	Candidate	Votes	%	±%
Country	Thomas Paterson	25,056	58.2	+0.5
Labor	Michael Buckley	18,030	41.8	+41.8
Total formal votes		43,086	98.0	
Informal votes		889	2.0	
Turnout		43,975	96.4	
Country hold		Swing	+0.5	

==== 1928 ====
1928 Australian federal election: Gippsland
Party	Candidate	Votes	%	±%
Country	Thomas Paterson	24,100	57.7	+13.1
Independent Liberal	George Wise	17,643	42.3	+19.5
Total formal votes		41,743	97.4	
Informal votes		1,101	2.6	
Turnout		42,844	95.4	
Country hold		Swing	−5.4	

==== 1925 ====
1925 Australian federal election: Gippsland
Party	Candidate	Votes	%	±%
Country	Thomas Paterson	18,423	44.6	+5.2
Labor	James Bermingham	13,417	32.5	+5.1
Ind. Nationalist	George Wise	9,428	22.8	+22.8
Total formal votes		41,268	97.1	
Informal votes		1,240	2.9	
Turnout		42,508	93.9	
Two-party-preferred result
Country	Thomas Paterson	26,055	63.1	+0.2
Labor	James Bermingham	15,213	36.9	+36.9
Country hold		Swing	+0.2	

==== 1922 ====
1922 Australian federal election: Gippsland
Party	Candidate	Votes	%	±%
Country	Thomas Paterson	9,132	39.4	−5.4
Nationalist	George Wise	7,682	33.2	−22.0
Labor	James Bermingham	6,357	27.4	+27.4
Total formal votes		23,171	96.1	
Informal votes		950	3.9	
Turnout		24,121	56.1	
Two-party-preferred result
Country	Thomas Paterson	14,563	62.9	+18.1
Nationalist	George Wise	8,608	37.1	−18.1
Country gain from Nationalist		Swing	+18.1	

=== Elections in the 1910s ===
==== 1919 ====
1919 Australian federal election: Gippsland
Party	Candidate	Votes	%	±%
Nationalist	George Wise	14,367	55.2	−17.5
Victorian Farmers	Erland Erlandson	11,675	44.8	+44.8
Total formal votes		26,042	98.7	
Informal votes		344	1.3	
Turnout		26,386	73.5	
Nationalist hold		Swing	−17.5	

==== 1917 ====
1917 Australian federal election: Gippsland
Party	Candidate	Votes	%	±%
Nationalist	George Wise	21,851	72.7	+23.7
Labor	Thomas Holloway	8,215	27.3	+27.3
Total formal votes		30,066	98.3	
Informal votes		518	1.7	
Turnout		30,584	84.6	
Nationalist gain from Independent Labor		Swing	+24.7	

==== 1914 ====
1914 Australian federal election: Gippsland
Party	Candidate	Votes	%	±%
Independent Labor	George Wise	15,484	51.0	+6.0
Liberal	James Bennett	14,874	49.0	−6.0
Total formal votes		30,358	98.5	
Informal votes		473	1.5	
Turnout		30,831	83.3	
Independent Labor gain from Liberal		Swing	+6.0	

==== 1913 ====
1913 Australian federal election: Gippsland
Party	Candidate	Votes	%	±%
Liberal	James Bennett	15,473	55.0	+12.7
Independent	George Wise	12,671	45.0	−12.7
Total formal votes		28,144	98.4	
Informal votes		471	1.6	
Turnout		28,615	75.5	
Liberal gain from Independent		Swing	+12.7	

==== 1910 ====
1910 Australian federal election: Gippsland
Party	Candidate	Votes	%	±%
Independent Liberal	George Wise	11,306	62.1	+62.1
Liberal	James Bowden	6,897	37.9	−62.1
Total formal votes		18,203	99.0	
Informal votes		181	1.0	
Turnout		18,384	65.5	
Independent Liberal gain from Liberal		Swing	+62.1	

=== Elections in the 1900s ===
==== 1906 ====
1906 Australian federal election: Gippsland
Party	Candidate	Votes	%	±%
Protectionist	George Wise	7,825	50.3	−49.7
Protectionist	Allan McLean	7,728	49.7	+49.7
Total formal votes		15,553	96.3	
Informal votes		601	3.7	
Turnout		16,154	55.2	
Protectionist hold		Swing	−49.7	

==== 1903 ====
1903 Australian federal election: Gippsland
Party	Candidate	Votes	%	±%
Protectionist	Allan McLean	unopposed		
Protectionist hold		Swing		

==== 1901 ====
1901 Australian federal election: Gippsland
Party	Candidate	Votes	%	±%
Protectionist	Allan McLean	unopposed		
Protectionist win		(new seat)		
