= Members of the Australian House of Representatives, 1919–1922 =

This is a list of the members of the Australian House of Representatives in the Eighth Australian Parliament, which was elected at the 1919 election on 13 December 1919.

Member	Party	Electorate	State	In office
Frank Anstey	Labor	Bourke	Vic	1910–1934
Llewellyn Atkinson	Nationalist/Country	Wilmot	Tas	1906–1929
Fred Bamford	Nationalist	Herbert	Qld	1901–1925
James Bayley	Nationalist	Oxley	Qld	1917–1931
George Bell	Nationalist	Darwin	Tas	1919–1922, 1925–1943
Sir Robert Best	Nationalist	Kooyong	Vic	1910–1922
Arthur Blakeley	Labor	Darling	NSW	1917–1934
Reginald Blundell	Nationalist	Adelaide	SA	1919–1922
Eric Bowden	Nationalist	Nepean	NSW	1906–1910, 1919–1929
Frank Brennan	Labor	Batman	Vic	1911–1931, 1934–1949
Stanley Bruce	Nationalist	Flinders	Vic	1918–1929, 1931–1933
Reginald Burchell	Nationalist	Fremantle	WA	1913–1922
Donald Cameron	Nationalist	Brisbane	Qld	1919–1931, 1934–1937
James Catts	Labor/Majority Labor	Cook	NSW	1906–1922
John Chanter	Nationalist	Riverina	NSW	1901–1903, 1904–1913, 1914–1922
Austin Chapman	Nationalist	Eden-Monaro	NSW	1901–1926
Matthew Charlton	Labor	Hunter	NSW	1910–1928
Michael Considine	Independent/ISLP	Barrier	NSW	1917–1922
Sir Joseph Cook	Nationalist	Parramatta	NSW	1901–1921
Robert Cook	Victorian Farmers/Country	Indi	Vic	1919–1928
Edward Corser	Nationalist	Wide Bay	Qld	1915–1928
Lou Cunningham	Labor	Gwydir	NSW	1919–1925, 1929–1931
James Fenton	Labor	Maribyrnong	Vic	1910–1934
William Fleming	Nationalist/Country	Robertson	NSW	1913–1922
Richard Foster	Nationalist/Liberal	Wakefield	SA	1909–1928
James Fowler	Nationalist	Perth	WA	1901–1922
Frederick Francis	Independent	Henty	Vic	1919–1925
Moses Gabb	Labor	Angas	SA	1919–1925, 1929–1934
William Gibson	Victorian Farmers/Country	Corangamite	Vic	1918–1929, 1931–1934
Henry Gregory	Nationalist/Country	Dampier	WA	1913–1940
Littleton Groom	Nationalist	Darling Downs	Qld	1901–1929, 1931–1936
Alexander Hay	Nationalist/Country/Independent	New England	NSW	1919–1922
William Higgs	Labor/Independent/Nationalist	Capricornia	Qld	1910–1922
William Hill	Victorian Farmers/Country	Echuca	Vic	1919–1934
Billy Hughes	Nationalist	Bendigo	Vic	1901–1952
Syd Jackson	Nationalist	Bass	Tas	1919–1929
Elliot Johnson	Nationalist	Lang	NSW	1903–1928
Edmund Jowett	Victorian Farmers/Country	Grampians	Vic	1917–1922
Edwin Kerby	Nationalist	Ballarat	Vic	1919–1920
William Laird Smith	Nationalist	Denison	Tas	1910–1922
Hector Lamond	Nationalist	Illawarra	NSW	1917–1922
Thomas Lavelle	Labor	Calare	NSW	1919–1922
Bert Lazzarini	Labor	Werriwa	NSW	1919–1931, 1934–1952
John Lister	Nationalist	Corio	Vic	1917–1929
John Livingston	Nationalist	Barker	SA	1906–1922
George Mackay	Nationalist	Lilley	Qld	1917–1934
Hugh Mahon	Labor	Kalgoorlie	WA	1901–1917, 1919–1920
William Mahony	Labor	Dalley	NSW	1915–1927
Norman Makin	Labor	Hindmarsh	SA	1919–1946, 1954–1963
William Maloney	Labor	Melbourne	Vic	1904–1940
Walter Marks	Nationalist	Wentworth	NSW	1919–1931
Charles Marr	Nationalist	Parkes	NSW	1919–1929, 1931–1943
Walter Massy-Greene	Nationalist	Richmond	NSW	1910–1922
James Mathews	Labor	Melbourne Ports	Vic	1906–1931
George Maxwell	Nationalist	Fawkner	Vic	1917–1935
Charles McDonald	Labor	Kennedy	Qld	1901–1925
William McWilliams	Nationalist/Country	Franklin	Tas	1903–1922, 1928–1929
Parker Moloney	Labor	Hume	NSW	1910–1913, 1914–1917, 1919–1931
Samuel Nicholls	Labor	Macquarie	NSW	1917–1922
Earle Page	Farmers and Settlers/Country	Cowper	NSW	1919–1961
Jim Page	Labor	Maranoa	Qld	1901–1921
Alexander Poynton	Nationalist	Grey	SA	1901–1922
John Prowse	Farmers and Settlers/Country	Swan	WA	1919–1943
Edward Riley	Labor	South Sydney	NSW	1910–1931
Arthur Rodgers	Nationalist	Wannon	Vic	1913–1922, 1925–1929
T. J. Ryan	Labor	West Sydney	NSW	1919–1921
Granville Ryrie	Nationalist	North Sydney	NSW	1911–1927
Percy Stewart	Victorian Farmers/Country	Wimmera	Vic	1919–1931
William Story	Nationalist	Boothby	SA	1904–1917 (S), 1917–1922
Frank Tudor	Labor	Yarra	Vic	1901–1922
David Watkins	Labor	Newcastle	NSW	1901–1935
William Watt	Nationalist/Liberal	Balaclava	Vic	1914–1929
John West	Labor	East Sydney	NSW	1910–1931
Arnold Wienholt	Nationalist	Moreton	Qld	1919–1922
George Wise	Nationalist	Gippsland	Vic	1906–1913, 1914–1922
