= Central Gippsland (disambiguation) =

Central Gippsland or variation, may refer to:

- Central Gippsland, a geographic region of the Australian state of Victoria
- Shire of Wellington, Victoria, Australia; the administrative district corresponding to the geographic region
- Electoral district of Gippsland Central of the Victorian Legislative Assembly for the state of Victoria in Australia

== See also ==
- Central (disambiguation)
- Gippsland (disambiguation)
