= People's Party (Victoria) =

- Founded: October 1910
- Dissolved: October 1917
- Merged into: National Federation
- Membership (1912): 30,000
- Ideology: Agrarianism; Anti-socialism

The People's Party was a political organisation in the Australian state of Victoria. It was established in 1910 by farmers opposed to the Australian Labor Party (ALP). It co-ordinated political campaigns with other anti-Labor organisations, supporting the parliamentary Liberals and later the Nationalists after 1917. It merged into the National Federation in 1917, after an earlier abortive merger with the Commonwealth Liberal Party.

== History ==
The People's Party arose after the 1910 federal election, which resulted in the Australian Labor Party (ALP) forming a majority government for the first time. It was formed "mainly as a result of farmer reaction to Labor's land tax policy and the extension to rural employees of the Commonwealth Conciliation and Arbitration Act". The party was formally launched in Horsham, Victoria, on 29 October 1910. The acting prime minister Billy Hughes described it as "one of those organisations that from time to time are launched upon a credulous public in the vain hope that by changing a name the situation is affected". The organisation grew rapidly, drawing on the membership base of the existing "farmer's leagues" and branches of the Australian Women's National League (AWNL). According to John La Nauze, it was "apparently largely composed of the husbands and brothers of members of the AWNL". It claimed 16,000 members in September 1911 and 30,000 members a year later, spread across 388 branches.

In the lead-up to the 1911 Australian referendum, the People's Party co-ordinated the "No" campaign in Victoria with the AWNL and Alfred Deakin's Commonwealth Liberal Party (CLP). The success of the joint campaign led to an attempted merger with the CLP, which pre-emptively changed its name to the People's Liberal Party (PLP). However, the merger was called off at the last minute. The People's Party eventually merged into Billy Hughes' National Federation in October 1917, having supported the election of Nationalist candidates at the 1917 federal election. However, the party's influence was already declining at this time due to the decision of the Victorian Farmers' Union to enter electoral politics.

== Notable members ==
Future federal government ministers Arthur Rodgers and William Gibson were members of the People's Party. Rodgers served as a vice-president and helped draw up the party's manifesto, while Gibson served as secretary of the Lismore branch. James Bennett, who was briefly the federal MP for Gippsland, was the inaugural secretary of the party and worked as a paid organiser. At state level, the party supported the candidacy of James Menzies at the 1911 Victorian state election. His son Robert Menzies became prime minister of Australia. James Menzies was eventually defeated at the 1920 election by Marcus Wettenhall, another former member of the People's Party.

== Sources ==
- Aimer, Peter (1970). Liberal Party organisation in Victoria, 1945–68 (PDF) (Ph.D. thesis). Australian National University.
