= 1918 Corangamite by-election =

- 14 December 1918
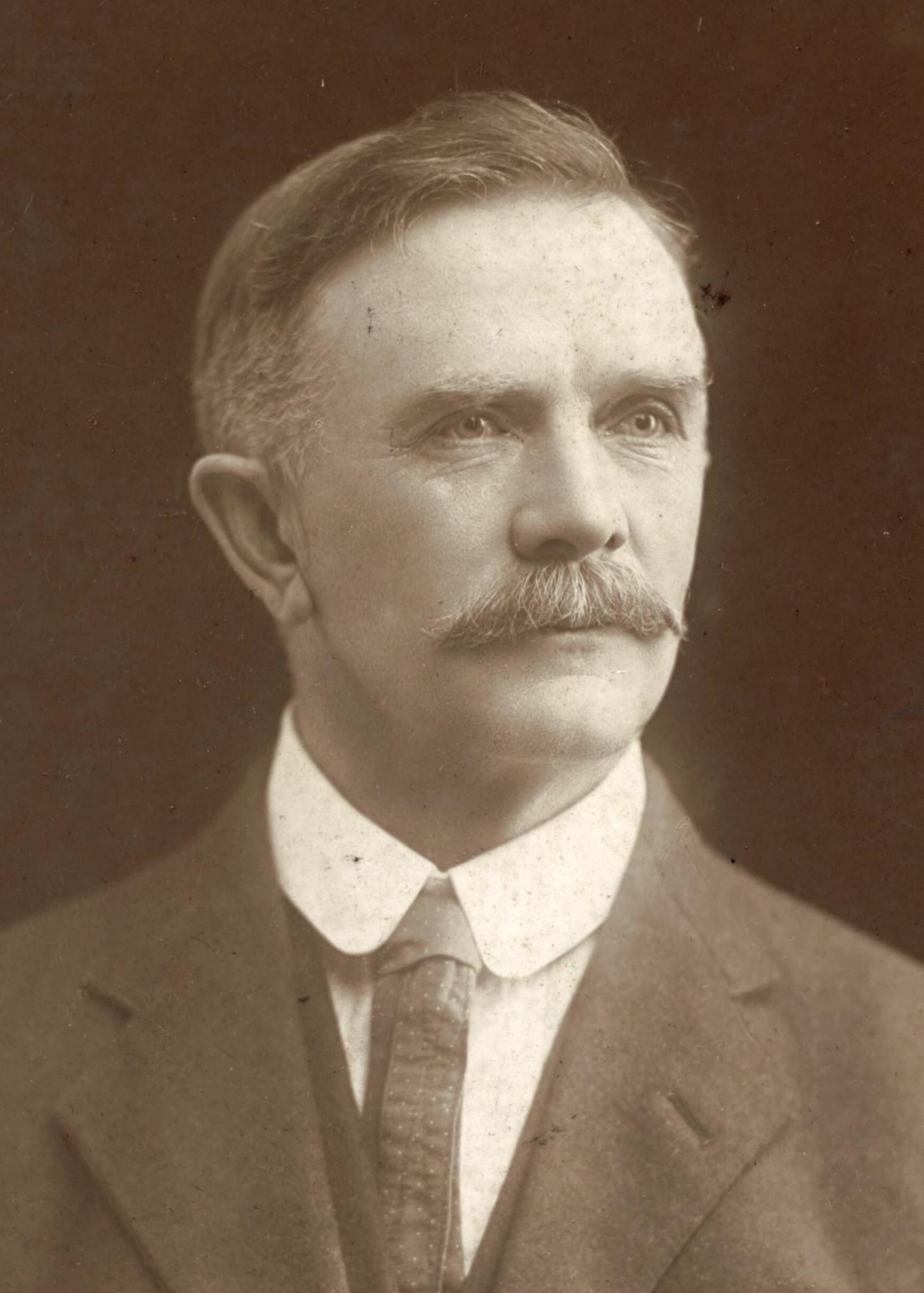

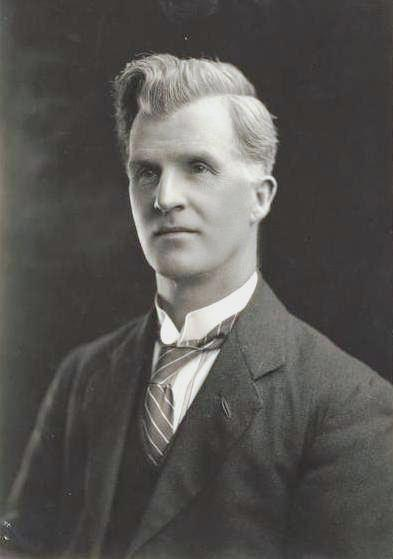
	First party	Second party	Third party
			NAT
Candidate	William Gibson	James Scullin	George Knox
Party	Victorian Farmers	Labor	Nationalist
Popular vote	6,604	10,630	5,737
Percentage	26.4%	42.5%	22.9%
Swing	▲26.4pp	▲2.9pp	▼37.5pp
TPP	56.3%	43.7%
TPP swing	▲56.3pp	▲4.1pp
MP before election
Chester Manifold
Nationalist
Elected MP
William Gibson
Victorian Farmers

A by-election was held for the Australian House of Representatives seat of Corangamite on 14 December 1918. This was triggered by the death of Nationalist MP Chester Manifold.

In October, the Labor Party had won a by-election for the safe conservative seat of Swan when the entry of the Farmers' and Settlers' Association had split the conservative vote. The Nationalists quickly introduced preferential voting, which was first practiced at the Corangamite by-election. Although the Labor candidate, future Prime Minister James Scullin, came first on the primary vote, Nationalist preferences elected William Gibson of the Victorian Farmers' Union, who thus became the first "Country" member of the Australian Parliament.

== Results ==
Corangamite by-election, 1918
Party	Candidate	Votes	%	±%
Labor	James Scullin	10,630	42.5	+2.9
Victorian Farmers	William Gibson	6,604	26.4	+26.4
Nationalist	George Knox	5,737	22.9	−37.5
Ind. Nationalist	Russell Coldham	1,174	4.7	+4.7
Returned Soldiers	Thomas Leaper	895	3.6	+3.6
Total formal votes		25,040	98.0	
Informal votes		516	2.0	
Turnout		25,553	73.2	
Two-party-preferred result
Victorian Farmers	William Gibson	14,096	56.3	+56.3
Labor	James Scullin	10,944	43.7	+4.1
Victorian Farmers gain from Nationalist		Swing	−4.1	
