= List of Australian electorates contested at every election =

Of the 65 federal electoral divisions first contested at the 1901 election, 32 are still in existence without ever being abolished. These are referred to as Federation Divisions, with the Australian Electoral Commission's redistribution guidelines stating that "Every effort should be made to retain the names of original federation divisions".

- The Division of Oxley (1901–1934) was abolished in 1934. Its name was revived in 1949 for a seat in a different area from the original, so Oxley has not been contested at every election.
- The Division of Riverina was abolished in 1984 and re-created in 1993, so it has not been contested at every election.
- Although there were 75 members in the House of Representatives in 1901, there were only 65 divisions contested as the states of South Australia and Tasmania consisted of single multi-member divisions electing 7 and 5 members respectively.

State	Divisions at 1901 election	Current Federation divisions
New South Wales	26	12
Victoria	23	10
Queensland	9	7
Western Australia	5	3
South Australia	1	0
Tasmania	1	0
TOTAL	65	32

In the state parliaments:

- In New South Wales, there is only one of the original 34 contested in 1856 that still exists.
- In Victoria, three of the original 37 contested in 1856 still exist.
- In Queensland there is only one of the original 16 contested in 1860.
- In South Australia there is also only one of the original 17 contested in 1856.
- In Western Australia, five of the original 30 contested in 1890 still exist.
- In the Northern Territory, there are seven of the original 19 contested in 1974.
- In both Tasmania and the Australian Capital Territory none still exist.

== Federal ==
Division	State
Division of Ballarat	Vic
Division of Bendigo	Vic
Division of Brisbane	Qld
Division of Capricornia	Qld
Division of Corangamite	Vic
Division of Corio	Vic
Division of Cowper	NSW
Division of Eden-Monaro	NSW
Division of Flinders	Vic
Division of Fremantle	WA
Division of Gippsland	Vic
Division of Herbert	Qld
Division of Hume	NSW
Division of Hunter	NSW
Division of Indi	Vic
Division of Kennedy	Qld
Division of Kooyong	Vic
Division of Macquarie	NSW
Division of Maranoa	Qld
Division of Melbourne	Vic
Division of Moreton	Qld
Division of New England	NSW
Division of Newcastle	NSW
Division of Parramatta	NSW
Division of Perth	WA
Division of Richmond	NSW
Division of Robertson	NSW
Division of Swan	WA
Division of Wannon	Vic
Division of Wentworth	NSW
Division of Werriwa	NSW
Division of Wide Bay	Qld

== State ==
=== New South Wales ===
- Electoral district of Parramatta

=== Victoria ===
- Electoral district of Brighton
- Electoral district of Richmond (Victoria)
- Electoral district of Williamstown

=== Queensland ===
- Electoral district of South Brisbane

=== South Australia ===
- Electoral district of Flinders

=== Western Australia ===
- Electoral district of Albany
- Electoral district of Bunbury
- Electoral district of Fremantle
- Electoral district of Geraldton
- Electoral district of Murray-Wellington

=== Northern Territory ===
- Electoral division of Arnhem
- Electoral division of Barkly
- Electoral division of Casuarina
- Electoral division of Fannie Bay
- Electoral division of Nightcliff
- Electoral division of Port Darwin
- Electoral division of Sanderson
