= West Gippsland (disambiguation) =

West Gippsland is a primary sub-provincial geographic region of the Australian state of Victoria.

West Gippsland or variation, may also refer to:

- Electoral district of Gippsland West of the Victorian Legislative Assembly for the state of Victoria in Australia
- West Gippsland Hospital, Warragul, Victoria, Australia
- West Gippsland Football League (disambiguation), several leagues
- West Gippsland Gazette, Warragul, Victoria, Australia; a newspaper

== See also ==
- Gippsland (disambiguation)
