= North Gippsland (disambiguation) =

North Gippsland or variation, may refer to:

- North Gippsland, a geographic region of the Australian state of Victoria
- Electoral district of Gippsland North of the Victorian Legislative Assembly for the state of Victoria in Australia
- North Gippsland Football League (Australian rules football)

== See also ==
- Gippsland (disambiguation)
