= Shire of South Gippsland =

Shire of South Gippsland may refer to one of two local government entities in the Australian state of Victoria:

- South Gippsland Shire, created in 1994 and based in Leongatha
- Shire of South Gippsland (former), in existence until 1994 and based in Foster, covering a much smaller area than its modern equivalent

== See also ==
- South Gippsland (disambiguation)
