= South Gippsland (disambiguation) =

South Gippsland or variation, may refer to:

== Places ==
- South Gippsland, a region of the Australian state of Victoria, which includes the Shire of South Gippsland
- South Gippsland Shire (since 1994), a local government area in the Australian state of Victoria
- Shire of South Gippsland (former) (1894-1994), a former local government area in the Australian state of Victoria
- Electoral district of Gippsland South of the Victorian Legislative Assembly for the state of Victoria in Australia

== Transportation ==
- South Gippsland railway line, Victoria, Australia; a rail line
- South Gippsland Railway, Victoria, Australia; a tourist railway
- South Gippsland Freeway, Victoria, Australia;
- South Gippsland Highway, Victoria, Australia;

== Other uses ==
- 22nd Battalion (South Gippsland Regiment), a unit of the Australian army

== See also ==
- Shire of South Gippsland (disambiguation)
- South (disambiguation)
- Gippsland (disambiguation)
