= East Gippsland (disambiguation) =

East Gippsland may refer to one of these overlapping regions in Victoria, Australia:

- East Gippsland, a geographic region, which includes the Shire of East Gippsland and may also include Central Gippsland
- Shire of East Gippsland, a local government area
- Electoral district of Gippsland East of the Victorian Legislative Assembly, covering most of eastern Victoria

== See also ==
- East (disambiguation)
- Gippsland (disambiguation)
