= Gippsland (disambiguation) =

Gippsland is a primary sub-provincial division of the Australian state of Victoria.

Gippsland may also refer to:

== Places ==
- Division of Gippsland, an Australian federal electoral division in the state of Victoria
- Gippsland Province, an Australian provincial electoral district for the state of Victoria
- Electoral district of Gippsland, an Australian provincial electoral district for the state of Victoria
- Electoral district of Gipps' Land, an Australian provincial electoral district for the state of Victoria
- Anglican Diocese of Gippsland, Victoria, Australia

== Other uses ==
- Gippsland languages, a language family spoken in Gippsland, Victoria, Australia
- Gippsland Aeronautics, an Australian aircraft manufacturer
- Gippsland Grammar School, Sale, Victoria, Australia
- Gippsland railway line, a rail line between Melbourne, Latrobe Valley, and Gippsland, Victoria, Australia
- Gippsland V/Line rail service, a rail service between Gippsland and Melbourne, Victoria, Australia

== See also ==
- Gippsland Times, Sale, Victoria, Australia; a newspaper
- East Gippsland (disambiguation)
- North Gippsland (disambiguation)
- South Gippsland (disambiguation)
- West Gippsland (disambiguation)
- Land (disambiguation)
- Gipps (disambiguation)
- Gipp, a surname
