= Allan McLean (Australian politician) =

Australian politician (1840–1911)

The Honourable Allan McLean
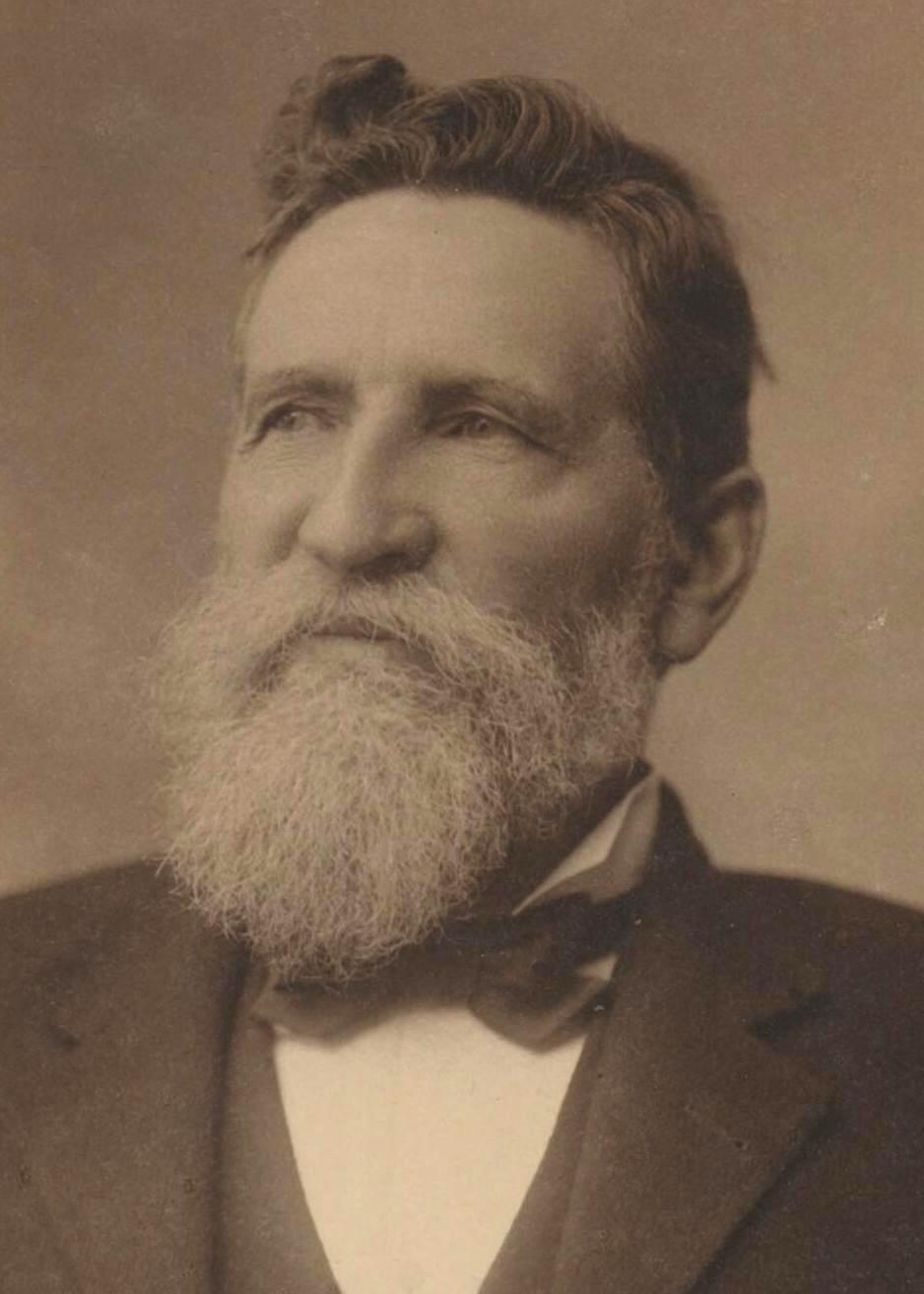

19th Premier of Victoria
- In office 5 December 1899 – 19 November 1900
- Governor: Lord Brassey
- Preceded by: George Turner
- Succeeded by: George Turner

Federal Minister for Trade and Customs
- In office 18 August 1904 – 5 July 1905
- Prime Minister: George Reid
- Preceded by: Andrew Fisher
- Succeeded by: William Lyne

Member of the Australian House of Representatives
- In office 29 March 1901 – 12 December 1906
- Preceded by: New Seat
- Succeeded by: George Wise
- Constituency: Gippsland

Member of the Victorian Legislative Assembly
- In office February 1880 – March 1901
- Preceded by: Charles Gavan Duffy
- Succeeded by: Hubert Keogh
- Constituency: Gippsland North

Personal details
- Born: 3 February 1840 Oban, Argyll, Scotland
- Died: 13 July 1911 (aged 71) Albert Park, Victoria, Australia
- Party: Protectionist
- Spouses: Margaret Shinnick (m. 1866–1884) Emily Macarthur (m. 1885)

Allan McLean (3 February 1840 – 13 July 1911) was an Australian politician who served as the 19th Premier of Victoria, in office from 1899 to 1900. He was later elected to federal parliament, where he served as a government minister under George Reid.

McLean was born in Argyll, Scotland, and arrived in Australia as a child. His family settled in the Gippsland region of Victoria, and he eventually acquired a sheep station near Lake Wellington. McLean was elected to the Victorian Legislative Assembly in 1880 and was promoted to cabinet in 1890, serving under James Munro, William Shiels, and George Turner. He replaced Turner as premier in 1899, but was defeated at the following year's general election. McLean entered the new federal parliament in 1901, as a member of the Protectionist Party. He was a leader of its conservative wing, and in 1904 crossed the floor to become Minister for Trade and Customs in the Reid government. He was the de facto deputy prime minister. The government was defeated in 1905, and he lost his seat at the 1906 election.

== Early life ==
McLean was born in the highlands of Scotland and came to Australia as a child in 1842 with his family. He later said 'were practically frozen out of Scotland' by 'an exceptionally severe winter'. His father, Charles McLean, was a grazier near Tarraville, in the Gippsland region of Victoria.

== Victorian politics ==
McLean was elected to the Victorian Legislative Assembly for Gippsland North in May 1880. A conservative, he was President of the Board of Land and Works and Minister of Agriculture in the James Munro ministry from 1890 to 1891, and Chief Secretary from 1891 to 1892, retaining this position under William Shiels from 1892 to 1893. He became a minister without portfolio in the liberal government of George Turner in 1894, but resigned in April 1898. On 5 December 1899, he moved and carried a vote of no-confidence, becoming Premier and Chief Secretary, but his government lasted less than a year. At the 1900 election the conservatives were defeated and Turner reclaimed the premiership.

== Federal politics ==
McLean was an opponent of Australian federation and was not a member of the conventions which shaped the Australian Constitution. However, reassured to some degree by Deakin's composite stand as an Australian Briton, McLean sent him to London in January 1900 as Victoria's representative in negotiations with the British government.

In March 1901, however, he was elected a member of the first Australian House of Representatives for the seat of Gippsland, and sat as a supporter of the Protectionist Party of Edmund Barton and Alfred Deakin. McLean belonged to the conservative wing of the party and opposed Deakin's increasingly warm alliance with the Labour Party.

In April 1904 Deakin resigned and the Labour leader, Chris Watson, formed a minority government. Watson resigned in August, and the Free Trade leader George Reid formed another minority government, supported by the conservative Protectionists. McLean came into the cabinet as Minister for Trade and Customs, and his position was so strong that the government is often referred to as the Reid-McLean ministry.

This composite ministry was, however, not a success. It was constantly being assailed by the Labour Party and the radical Protectionist section of Deakin's followers, such as H. B. Higgins and Isaac Isaacs. It lasted for less than 11 months, and fell when Deakin withdrew his support. This episode caused great bitterness in the Protectionist ranks, and at the 1906 election McLean was opposed in Gippsland by a radical Protectionist, George Wise, who narrowly defeated McLean with Labour support.

== Personal life ==
Mclean was twice married, once in 1866 to Margaret Bridget Shinnock of Maffra (ca.1847 – 7 August 1884), and subsequently, to Emily Macarthur (née Linton), who survived him with five sons and two daughters by the first marriage. His eldest son, William Joseph McLean (d. 19 April 1938) was a noted pastoralist, and senior partner in the firm of A. McLean and Co., stock and station agents of Maffra, Sale and Bairnsdale, and the Melbourne firm of McLean, McKenzie and Co.

Political offices
Preceded by George Turner	Premier of Victoria; 1899–1900	Succeeded by George Turner
Preceded by Andrew Fisher	Minister for Trade and Customs; 1904–1905	Succeeded by William Lyne
Parliament of Australia
New division	Member for Gippsland; 1901–1906	Succeeded by George Wise
