= Division of Corangamite =

Australian federal electoral division

Coordinates: 38.243°S 143.821°E

Corangamite Australian House of Representatives Division
- Interactive map of electorate boundaries from the 2025 federal election
- Created: 1901
- MP: Libby Coker
- Party: Labor
- Namesake: Lake Corangamite
- Electors: 114,177 (2025)
- Area: 640 km^{2} (247.1 sq mi)
- Demographic: Provincial
Electorates around Corangamite:
Corio	Corio Bay	Port Phillip
Wannon	Corangamite	Port Phillip
Wannon	Bass Strait	Flinders

The Division of Corangamite (/kəræŋɡəmaɪt/) is an Australian electoral division in the state of Victoria. The division was proclaimed in 1900, and was one of the original 65 divisions to be contested at the first federal election. It is named for Lake Corangamite, although the lake no longer falls within the division's boundaries.

The division was redrawn in 2021 and 2024, becoming a much smaller seat due to increased population growth. It now covers 640 square kilometres (250 sq mi) (down from 5,441 square kilometres (2,101 sq mi)) along the Victorian coast, including an eastern part of the growing surf coast area and the southern suburbs of Geelong. Starting at Queenscliff in the east, the electorate takes in the entire Bellarine Peninsula, then runs down the surf coast as far as Bells Beach.

Since the 2019 federal election, the current Member for Corangamite is Libby Coker, a member of the Australian Labor Party.

== Geography ==
Since 1984, federal electoral division boundaries in Australia have been determined at redistributions by a redistribution committee appointed by the Australian Electoral Commission. Redistributions occur for the boundaries of divisions in a particular state, and they occur every seven years, or sooner if a state's representation entitlement changes or when divisions of a state are malapportioned.

When the division was proclaimed in 1900, it covered roughly what is now City of Warrnambool, Moyne Shire, Corangamite Shire, Colac Otway Shire and Surf Coast Shire. It included the areas of Lake Corangamite, Warrnambool, Port Campbell, Apollo Bay, Camperdown, Colac and Winchelsea. Over time, its boundaries have changed massively in redistributions, and at some point in time, it had extended northwards up to Maryborough and Stawell and eastwards to Geelong, Bellarine Peninsula and Queenscliff.

In 1984, the division had shrunk to exclude Port Campbell and Camperdown, but still covered majority of the future Colac Otway and Surf Coast shires, some areas in Geelong and Bellarine Peninsula, and Lake Corangamite itself. It then covered similar areas until the 2021 redistribution. In that redistribution, the seat was shrunk even further towards Geelong, losing its western half (including Lake Corangamite) to the adjacent seat of Wannon and the north to Ballarat. In 2024, it was proposed that the seat be shrunk further towards Geelong and lose its western half to Corio and Wannon. Only a small portion of Surf Coast Shire including Torquay, Bellbrae and Jan Juc would remain included in the seat. This was eventually formalised in October that year.

Between the 2010 and 2024 redistributions, the seat had shrunk from 7,624 km^{2} (2,944 sq mi) to 640 km^{2} (250 sq mi), an approximately 92% decrease.

== History ==
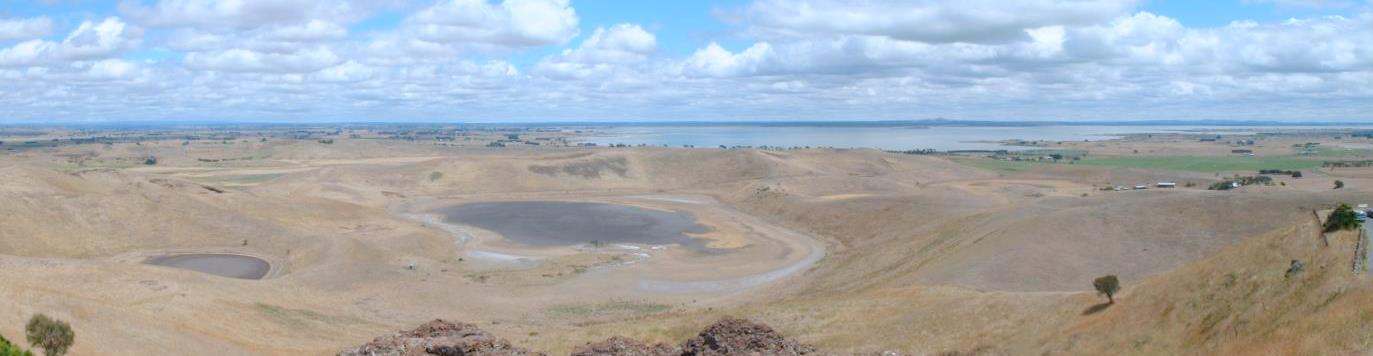
Lake Corangamite (in the background), the division's namesake

Until the 1930s it was usually a marginal seat which leaned toward the conservative parties, but was won by the Australian Labor Party during high-tide elections. In 1918, it was the first seat won by what would become the Country Party.

It was held by the Liberals (and their immediate predecessor, the United Australia Party) without interruption from 1934 to 2007. A reasonably safe seat for most of the time from the 1950s to the 1990s, it became increasingly less safe from 1998 onward as successive redistributions pushed it further into Geelong. This resulted in the seat falling to Darren Cheeseman, the Labor candidate, by less than one percent at the 2007 federal election for the first time since 1929. Cheeseman was only the third Labor member ever to win the seat. Labor retained the seat in 2010 election against former journalist Sarah Henderson, making Cheeseman the first Labor MP to win re-election in the seat. Henderson sought a rematch in 2013, and won.

Henderson retained her seat in 2016 but a redistribution completed prior to the 2019 election pushed the seat further into Geelong. This resulted in the seat becoming notionally Labor, albeit with a very narrow margin. As Henderson failed to gain a swing towards her at the election, she lost the seat to the Labor candidate, Libby Coker. Coker's win in 2019 was historically significant, as it marked the first time that the non-Labor parties had been in government without holding Corangamite.

In 2018, the Australian Electoral Commission (AEC) published its report on the proposed redistribution of Victoria's federal divisions. The report proposed renaming Corangamite to Cox, after swimming instructor May Cox. Incumbent MP Sarah Henderson said the new name "has already prompted some ridicule on social media", due to "Cox" being a homophone of "cocks". In the commission's final determination, the decision was made to retain the name of Corangamite. In 2021, the AEC again proposed to rename Corangamite, this time to Tucker after Aboriginal activist Margaret Tucker, however in the final determination, the renaming proposal was also abandoned over concerns that the name would be vandalised as "Fucker".

In July 2021, City of Greater Geelong Mayor and Bellarine Ward Councillor Stephanie Asher was preselected as the Liberal candidate for Corangamite. However, Coker won a second term with 57 percent of the two-party vote, a swing of six percent. This was the strongest showing for Labor in the seat’s history.

Prominent members of the seat have included James Scullin, who later became the Prime Minister of Australia in 1929–32; Fraser government Minister Tony Street and longtime Liberal backbencher Stewart McArthur.

== Members ==
Image	Member	Party	Term	Notes
	Chester Manifold (1867–1918)	Protectionist	29 March 1901 – 23 November 1903	Retired
	John Gratton Wilson (1863–1948)	Free Trade	16 December 1903 – 1906	Previously held the Victorian Legislative Assembly seat of Villiers and Heytesbury. Lost seat
	John Gratton Wilson (1863–1948)	Anti-Socialist	1906 – 26 May 1909	Previously held the Victorian Legislative Assembly seat of Villiers and Heytesbury. Lost seat
	John Gratton Wilson (1863–1948)	Liberal	26 May 1909 – 13 April 1910	Previously held the Victorian Legislative Assembly seat of Villiers and Heytesbury. Lost seat
	James Scullin (1876–1953)	Labor	13 April 1910 – 31 May 1913	Lost seat. Later elected to the Division of Yarra in 1922
	Chester Manifold (1867–1918)	Liberal	31 May 1913 – 17 February 1917	Died in office
	Chester Manifold (1867–1918)	Nationalist	17 February 1917 – 30 October 1918	Died in office
	William Gibson (1869–1955)	Victorian Farmers' Union	14 December 1918 – 22 January 1920	Served as minister under Bruce. Lost seat
	William Gibson (1869–1955)	Country	22 January 1920 – 12 October 1929	Served as minister under Bruce. Lost seat
	Richard Crouch (1868–1949)	Labor	12 October 1929 – 19 December 1931	Previously held the Division of Corio. Lost seat
	William Gibson (1869–1955)	Country	19 December 1931 – 7 August 1934	Transferred to the Senate
	Geoffrey Street (1894–1940)	United Australia	15 September 1934 – 13 August 1940	Served as minister under Lyons, Page and Menzies. Died in office. Son is Tony Street
	Allan McDonald (1888–1953)	United Australia	21 September 1940 – 21 February 1945	Previously held the Victorian Legislative Assembly seat of Polwarth. Served as minister under Menzies and Fadden. Died in office
	Allan McDonald (1888–1953)	Liberal	21 February 1945 – 10 June 1953	Previously held the Victorian Legislative Assembly seat of Polwarth. Served as minister under Menzies and Fadden. Died in office
	Dan Mackinnon (1903–1983)	Liberal	29 August 1953 – 31 October 1966	Previously held the Division of Wannon. Retired
	Tony Street (1926–2022)	Liberal	26 November 1966 – 18 January 1984	Served as minister under Fraser. Resigned to retire from politics. Father was Geoffrey Street
	Stewart McArthur (1937–)	Liberal	18 February 1984 – 24 November 2007	Lost seat
	Darren Cheeseman (1976–)	Labor	24 November 2007 – 7 September 2013	Lost seat. Later elected to the Victorian Legislative Assembly seat of South Barwon in 2018
	Sarah Henderson (1964–)	Liberal	7 September 2013 – 18 May 2019	Lost seat. Later appointed to the Senate in 2019
	Libby Coker (1962–)	Labor	18 May 2019 – present	Incumbent

== Election results ==
2025 Australian federal election: Corangamite
Party	Candidate	Votes	%	±%
Labor	Libby Coker	38,814	37.31	−1.09
Liberal	Darcy Dunstan	35,488	34.12	+0.10
Greens	Mitch Pope	14,925	14.35	−0.98
Independent	Kate Lockhart	4,565	4.39	+4.39
One Nation	Colin Seabrook	3,343	3.21	+0.77
Legalise Cannabis	Harley Mackenzie	3,161	3.04	+3.04
Trumpet of Patriots	James Jackson	2,452	2.36	+1.51
Libertarian	Paul Barker	1,272	1.22	−1.23
Total formal votes		104,020	96.28	+0.14
Informal votes		4,023	3.72	−0.14
Turnout		108,043	94.67	+6.61
Two-party-preferred result
Labor	Libby Coker	60,381	58.05	+0.21
Liberal	Darcy Dunstan	43,639	41.95	−0.21
Labor hold		Swing	+0.21	
