= James Chester Manifold =

Australian politician (1867–1918)

The Honourable James Chester Manifold
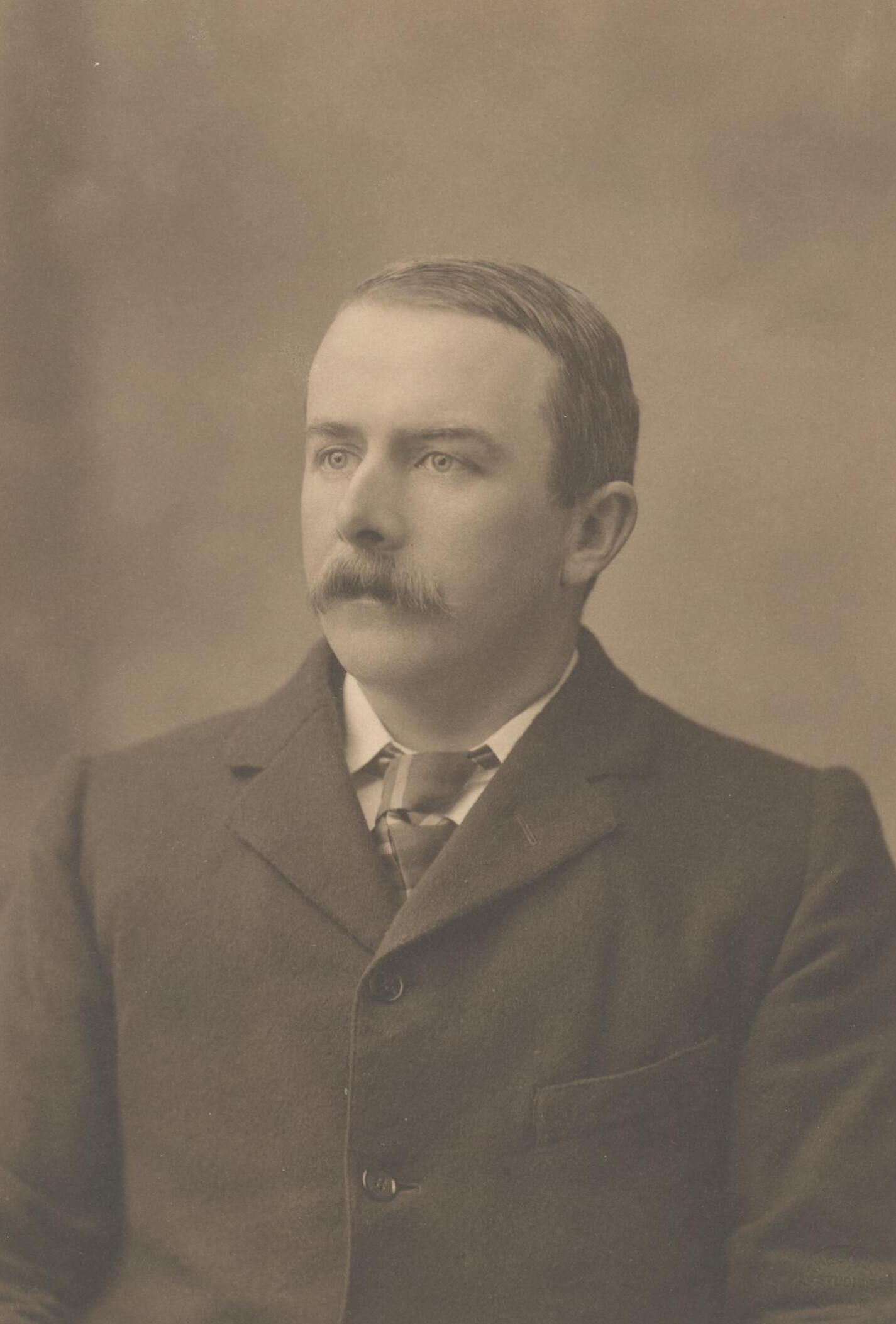

Member of the Australian Parliament for Corangamite
- In office 29 March 1901 – 23 November 1903
- Preceded by: New seat
- Succeeded by: Gratton Wilson
- In office 31 May 1913 – 30 October 1918
- Preceded by: James Scullin
- Succeeded by: William Gibson

Personal details
- Born: 10 February 1867 Camperdown, Victoria, Australia
- Died: 30 October 1918 (aged 51) At sea, Pacific Ocean
- Party: Protectionist (1901–09); Liberal (1909–17); Nationalist (1917–18)
- Spouse: Lilian Eva Curle
- Occupation: Landowner

James Chester Manifold (10 February 1867 – 30 October 1918) was an Australian politician and philanthropist.

== Early life ==
Manifold was born at Purrumbete, near Camperdown, Victoria, attended Geelong Grammar School, and went to England with his family in 1881. However, the family returned to Australia because the northern climate did not agree with his health, and he subsequently attended Melbourne Church of England Grammar School. When he came into possession of Talindert, a property left to him by his father, he mostly rented it to dairy farmers, to whom he later sold the land on liberal terms. He was a director of the Camperdown Cheese and Butter Factory, established in 1891, and was its chairman after 1907.

He was a member of Hampden Shire Council in the 1890s, being its president twice. On 11 March 1891, he married Lilian Eva Curle.

== Federal politics ==
Manifold was elected to the Australian House of Representatives in 1901 as the inaugural member for Corangamite, representing the Protectionist Party. He retired in 1903 due to ill health, but in 1913 was persuaded to oppose the sitting Labor member, future Prime Minister James Scullin, representing the Commonwealth Liberal Party. He defeated Scullin in the election of that year, and held the seat until his unexpected death from pneumonia on 30 October 1918, during a voyage to North America. He was buried at sea, and was survived by a son and a daughter. In 1921, a statue of Manifold by Nelson Illingworth was unveiled at Camperdown by Prime Minister Stanley Bruce.

His son, Sir Thomas Chester Manifold, was a member of the Victorian Legislative Assembly from 1929 to 1935, representing the electoral district of Hampden for the Nationalist Party and later the United Australia Party.

Parliament of Australia
Preceded by new seat	Member for Corangamite; 1901–1903	Succeeded by Gratton Wilson
Preceded by James Scullin	Member for Corangamite; 1913–1918	Succeeded by William Gibson
