= Peter Nixon =

Australian politician (1928–2025)

The Honourable Peter Nixon AO
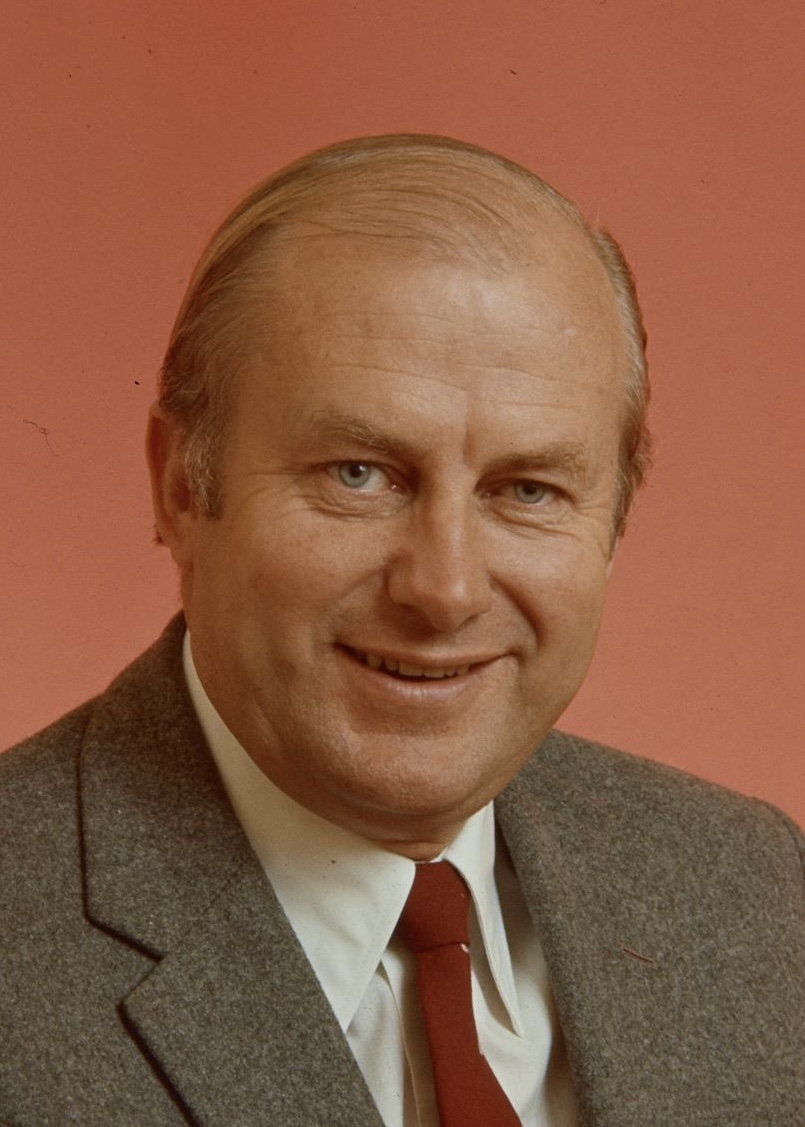
- Nixon in 1974

Minister for Primary Industry
- In office 27 September 1979 – 11 March 1983
- Prime Minister: Malcolm Fraser
- Preceded by: Ian Sinclair
- Succeeded by: John Kerin

Minister for Shipping and Transport
- In office 11 November 1975 – 8 December 1979
- Prime Minister: Malcolm Fraser
- Preceded by: Charles Jones
- Succeeded by: Ralph Hunt
- In office 5 February 1971 – 5 December 1972
- Prime Minister: John Gorton; William McMahon
- Preceded by: Charles Jones
- Succeeded by: Ralph Hunt

Postmaster-General
- In office 11 November 1975 – 22 December 1975
- Prime Minister: Malcolm Fraser
- Preceded by: Reg Bishop
- Succeeded by: Victor Garland

Minister for the Interior
- In office 16 October 1967 – 5 February 1971
- Prime Minister: Harold Holt; John McEwen; John Gorton
- Preceded by: Doug Anthony
- Succeeded by: Ralph Hunt

Member of the Australian Parliament for Gippsland
- In office 9 December 1961 – 4 February 1983
- Preceded by: George Bowden
- Succeeded by: Peter McGauran

Personal details
- Born: 22 March 1928 Orbost, Victoria, Australia
- Died: 1 May 2025 (aged 97) Melbourne, Victoria, Australia
- Party: Country / NCP
- Spouse: Sally Dahlsen (m. 1954–2013)
- Children: 3
- Education: Wesley College, Melbourne
- Occupation: Grazier, company director

Peter James Nixon AO (22 March 1928 – 1 May 2025) was an Australian politician and businessman. He served in the House of Representatives from 1961 to 1983, representing the Division of Gippsland as a member of the National Country Party (NCP). He held ministerial office as Minister for the Interior (1967–1971), Shipping and Transport (1971–1972), Postmaster-General (1975), Transport (1975–1979), and Primary Industry (1979–1983).

== Early life ==
Nixon was born on 22 March 1928 in Orbost, Victoria. He grew up on a farming property outside Orbost. During the Black Friday bushfires of 1939 he and his family had to seek shelter in the Snowy River.

Nixon attended Wesley College, Melbourne. At the age of 18, he sustained a severe injury to his left hip while playing Australian rules football, requiring him to spend eight months in hospital. He passed the time by reading and playing chess. Following his recovery Nixon took up farming, the fourth generation of his family to farm in Gippsland. He had a 500-acre (200 ha) property named Macclesfield, where he grew seed beans and maize. He later switched to mixed farming, growing lucerne and keeping dairy cattle.

== Political career ==
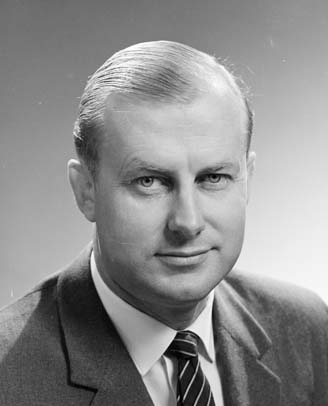
Nixon in 1967

Nixon was elected to parliament at the 1961 federal election, following the resignation of George Bowden, the incumbent Country Party MP in Gippsland. He had initially not been a candidate for preselection, agreeing to stand only when the presumed nominee suffered a fatal heart attack three days before nominations closed.

Nixon was one of several young Country Party MP's mentored by party leader John McEwen as part of his succession strategy, along with Doug Anthony and Ian Sinclair.

In 1967, Nixon was appointed Minister for the Interior in the Holt government, retaining the position in the Gorton government. He was elevated to cabinet following the 1969 election. Following a cabinet reshuffle he was instead appointed Minister for Shipping and Transport in the McMahon government in February 1971, holding the portfolio until the government's defeat at the 1972 federal election.

As interior minister, Nixon held responsibility for the Australian Capital Territory and oversight of the National Capital Development Commission. He was also responsible for the Northern Territory. Nixon is mentioned in the song Gurindji Blues, saying "Buy your land back, Gurindji" referring to his assessment of the Wattie Creek land rights strike.

In opposition from 1972 to 1975, Nixon was a prominent figure in persuading his National Party colleagues to help pass Australian Labor Party legislation opposed by the Nationals' coalition partner, the Liberal Party. Nixon was also a longtime critic of the Australian Broadcasting Corporation, which he accused of being biased against the National Party.

During the Fraser government, Nixon was a significant figure in the renamed National Country Party (NCP), along with Anthony and Sinclair. Nicknamed the "mulga mafia", the trio were "an assertive and sometimes combative presence in the House, and a significant influence on the government's policy agenda". Nixon briefly served as Postmaster-General in the first Fraser ministry following the dismissal of the Whitlam government. He subsequently returned to his prior role of Minister for Shipping and Transport, serving from 1975 to 1979. He then served as Minister for Primary Industry from 1979 until the government's defeat at the 1983 election.

In 1981, as primary industry minister, Nixon faced a scandal over meat substitution, whereby beef exports to the United States had been found to contain kangaroo and horse meat. The government subsequently announced a royal commission into the meat industry, which found that Nixon and his department had not responded adequately to earlier reports of misconduct within the industry. In response, Nixon offered his resignation to Fraser.

On the floor of parliament, Nixon was known for trading insults with opposition members and particularly his verbal stoushes with Fred Daly.

== Later life ==
In 1984, Nixon was appointed chair of Southern Cross Broadcasting. During his tenure Southern Cross underwent significant expansion, acquiring Melbourne radio stations 3AW and 3AK, Perth radio stations 6PR and 6IX, Tasmanian television station TNT, and Canberra television station CTC. In 1994, Hugh Lamberton wrote in The Canberra Times that Nixon was "one of the few long-serving politicians to have established a post-parliamentary life not overburdened with a nostalgic dependence on past achievement".

Outside of broadcasting, Nixon was a member of the Victorian Football League Commission from 1985 to 1991. In 1996, he was chosen to chair a joint Commonwealth-State inquiry into the Tasmanian economy. The report became known as the Nixon Report: Tasmania into the 21st Century. Trustee of MCC 86–91. Freeman City of Jakarta, Athens. Chief Commissioner East Gippsland Shire 95–97.

Nixon delivered the eulogy at Malcolm Fraser's state funeral in 2015.

== Personal life and death ==
In 1952, Nixon, married Jacqueline "Sally" Dahlsen, with whom he had three children.

In the 1990s, Nixon suffered severe injuries in a quad bike accident while spraying blackberries on his farm, including twenty fractures to his ribs, a broken sternum and a partially collapsed lung. The accident resulted in the loss of a kidney.

Nixon died in Melbourne on 1 May 2025, at the age of 97. At the time of his death, Nixon was the earliest elected Country MP still alive, and along with Ian Sinclair he was one of the last two surviving ministers who served under Holt, McEwen, Gorton and McMahon, as well as the First Fraser Ministry.

== Honours ==
On 26 January 1993, Nixon was made an Officer of the Order of Australia for his service to the Australian parliament and to the community.

Political offices
Preceded by Doug Anthony	Minister for the Interior; 1967–1971	Succeeded by Ralph Hunt
Preceded by Ian Sinclair	Minister for Shipping and Transport; 1971–1972	Succeeded by Gough Whitlam
Preceded by Reg Bishop	Postmaster-General; 1975	Succeeded by Victor Garland
Preceded by Charles Jones	Minister for Transport; 1975–1979	Succeeded by Ralph Hunt
Preceded by Ian Sinclair	Minister for Primary Industry; 1979–1983	Succeeded by John Kerin
Parliament of Australia
Preceded by George Bowden	Member for Gippsland; 1961–1983	Succeeded by Peter McGauran
