= James Bennett (Australian politician) =

Australian politician

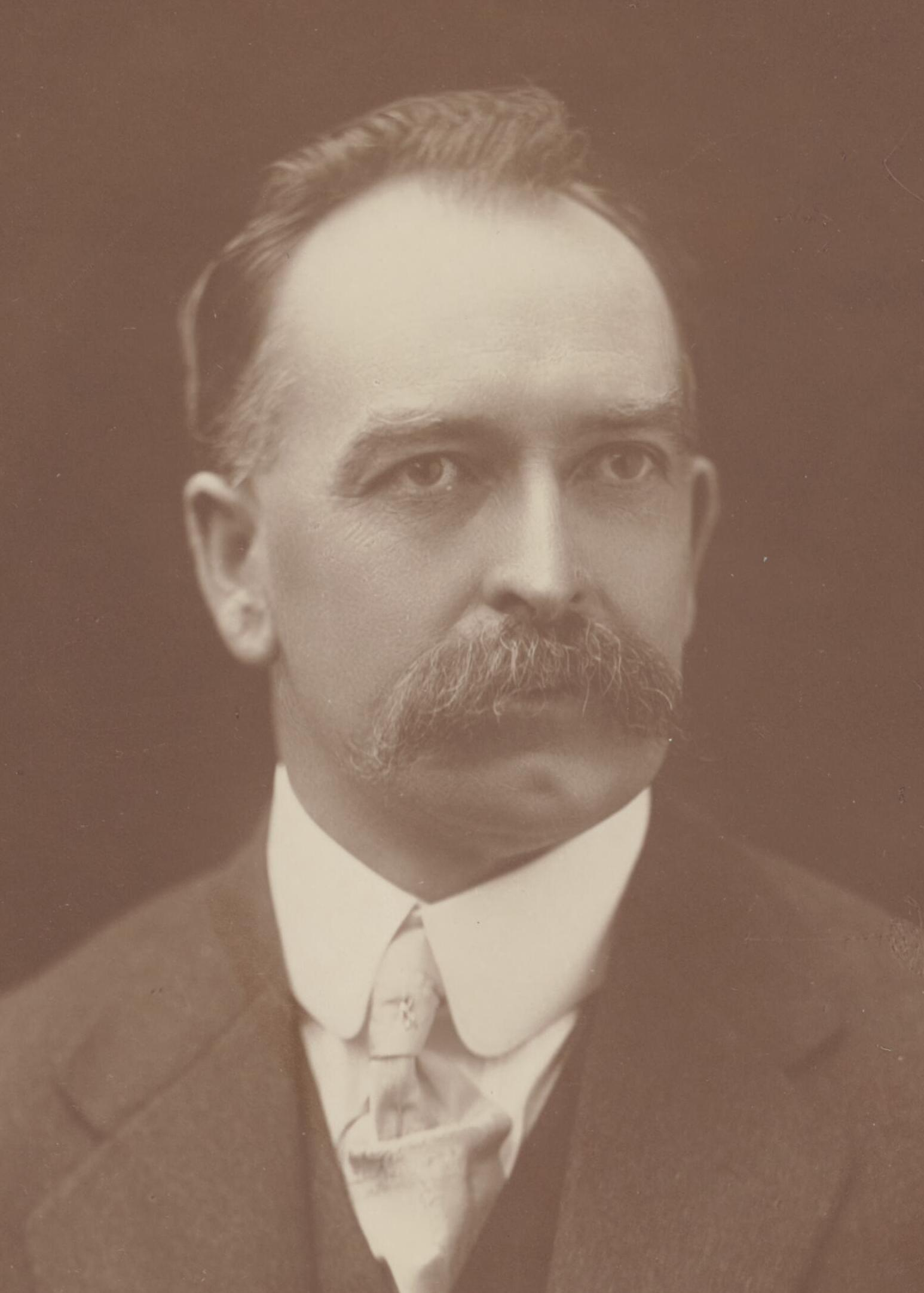

Member of the Australian Parliament for Gippsland
- In office 31 May 1913 – 5 September 1914
- Preceded by: George Wise
- Succeeded by: George Wise

Personal details
- Born: 1874 South Australia
- Died: 23 November 1951 (aged 76–77)
- Party: Liberal
- Other political affiliations: People's
- Occupation: Farmer

James Bennett (1874 – 23 November 1951) was an Australian farmer and politician. He was one of the founders of Victoria's People's Party and served a single term in the House of Representatives from 1913 to 1914. He represented the Victorian seat of Gippsland and sat as a Liberal in parliament.

== Early life ==
Bennett was born in 1874 in South Australia, either in Rapid Bay or Glenelg. He grew up on the Yorke Peninsula, leaving school at the age of 13. He and his parents moved to the Mallee region of Victoria two years later, settling on a 2,000-acre (810 ha) property located 6 miles (9.7 km) outside of Warracknabeal. Bennett bought his own farm in 1900, during the Federation Drought. He grew experimental varieties of wheat and conducted scientific tests on the effectiveness of different varieties of fertiliser, in cooperation with the state agricultural department. He was involved with various farmers' advocacy groups.

== Politics ==
Bennett was one of the co-founders of the People's Party in 1910, serving as the inaugural honorary secretary. He became a paid organiser for the party. In July 1912, he was selected as the endorsed candidate of the People's Party and the Australian Women's National League (AWNL) for the Division of Gippsland. He defeated the incumbent independent member George Wise at the 1913 federal election on a swing of 12.7 points. However, Wise reversed the result at the 1914 election on a swing of 6 points, winning by 610 votes. He was a supporter of preferential voting, and was described by Melbourne's Punch as "sound and reliable - a farmers' representative for a farmers' seat".

== Later life ==
Bennett later worked in Melbourne as a real estate agent and builder. He died on 21 November 1951.

Parliament of Australia
Preceded by George Wise	Member for Gippsland; 1913–1914	Succeeded by George Wise
