= William Gibson (Australian politician) =

Australian politician (1869–1955)

The Honourable William Gibson
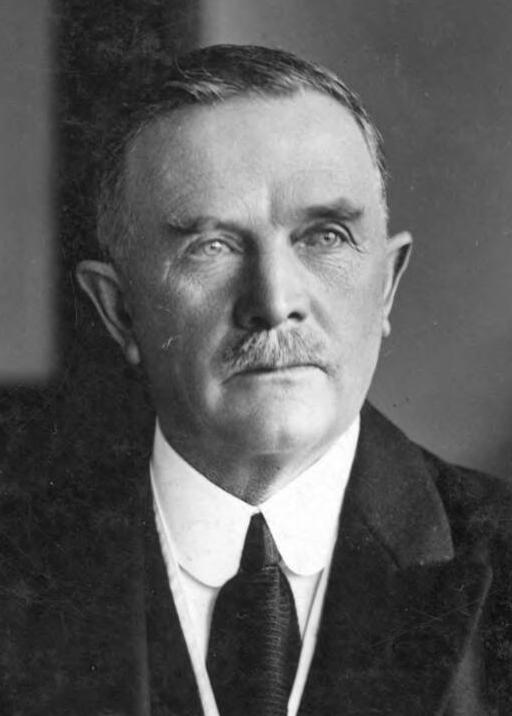

Minister for Works and Railways
- In office 10 December 1928 – 22 October 1929
- Prime Minister: Stanley Bruce
- Preceded by: William Hill
- Succeeded by: Joseph Lyons

Postmaster-General of Australia
- In office 5 February 1923 – 22 October 1929
- Prime Minister: Stanley Bruce
- Preceded by: Alexander Poynton
- Succeeded by: Joseph Lyons

Deputy Leader of the Country Party
- In office 16 January 1923 – 19 November 1929
- Leader: Earle Page
- Preceded by: William Fleming
- Succeeded by: Thomas Paterson

Member of the Australian Parliament for Corangamite
- In office 19 December 1931 – 7 August 1934
- Preceded by: Richard Crouch
- Succeeded by: Geoffrey Street
- In office 14 December 1918 – 12 October 1929
- Preceded by: Chester Manifold
- Succeeded by: Richard Crouch

Senator for Victoria
- In office 1 July 1935 – 30 June 1947

Personal details
- Born: 19 May 1869 Gisborne, Victoria, Australia
- Died: 22 May 1955 (aged 86) Lismore, Victoria, Australia
- Party: Country
- Other political affiliations: People's (1911); Independent (1935–1939)
- Spouse: Mary Paterson (m. 1896–1944)
- Relations: David Gibson (brother)
- Occupation: Farmer

William Gerrand Gibson (19 May 1869 – 22 May 1955) was an Australian politician. He was the first member of the Country Party elected to federal parliament, serving in the House of Representatives (1918–1929, 1931–1934) and as a Senator for Victoria (1935–1947). He was the party's deputy leader from 1923 to 1929 and was a government minister in the Bruce–Page government.

== Early life ==
Gibson was born on 19 May 1869 in Gisborne, Victoria. His parents Grace (née Gerrand) and David Gibson were both born in Scotland, and arrived in Victoria in 1860. His younger brother David also became a member of parliament. Gibson was educated locally, and worked with his father for a period before acquiring his own farm. He married Mary Helen Young Paterson on 4 November 1896 at Riddells Creek.

As well as farming, Gibson established himself as a merchant, running general stores at Romsey and Lancefield. He was president of the Romsey and West Bourke Agricultural Society and the local branch of the Australian Natives Association. In 1910, Gibson bought a subdivision of Gnarpurt, James Chester Manifold's property near Lismore in the Western District. He subsequently established a successful grazing property, with his brother David taking up land nearby in Cressy. He was elected manager of the Western Plains Co-operative Society in 1911.

== Politics ==
=== Early career ===
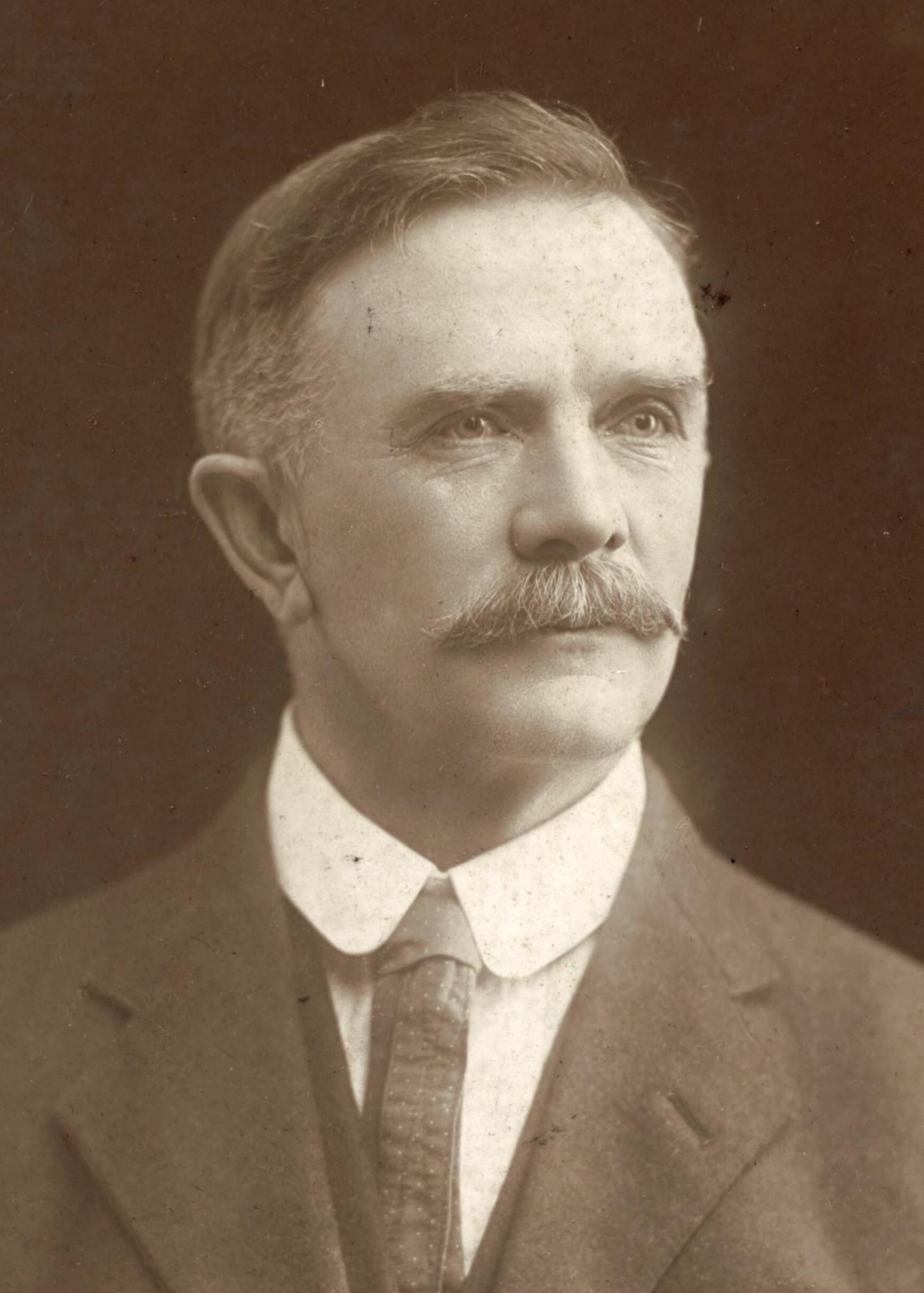
Gibson early in his political career

In 1911 Gibson was elected secretary of the Lismore branch of the People's Party. In 1916, Victorian farmers became suspicious of price-fixing of the price of wheat under the War Precautions Act 1914 and established the Victorian Farmers' Union in response and Gibson was elected secretary of its Lismore branch. His brother, David Havelock (Harvey), won the Victorian Legislative Assembly seat of Grenville for the union in 1917. At a 1918 by-election, he won the federal seat of Corangamite for the Farmers' Union, defeating James Scullin on preferences. It was the first win for what would become the Country Party. In February 1920, when parliament resumed after the 1919 federal election, Gibson chaired the inaugural meeting of the parliamentary Country Party, which saw William McWilliams elected unopposed as leader.

=== Government minister ===
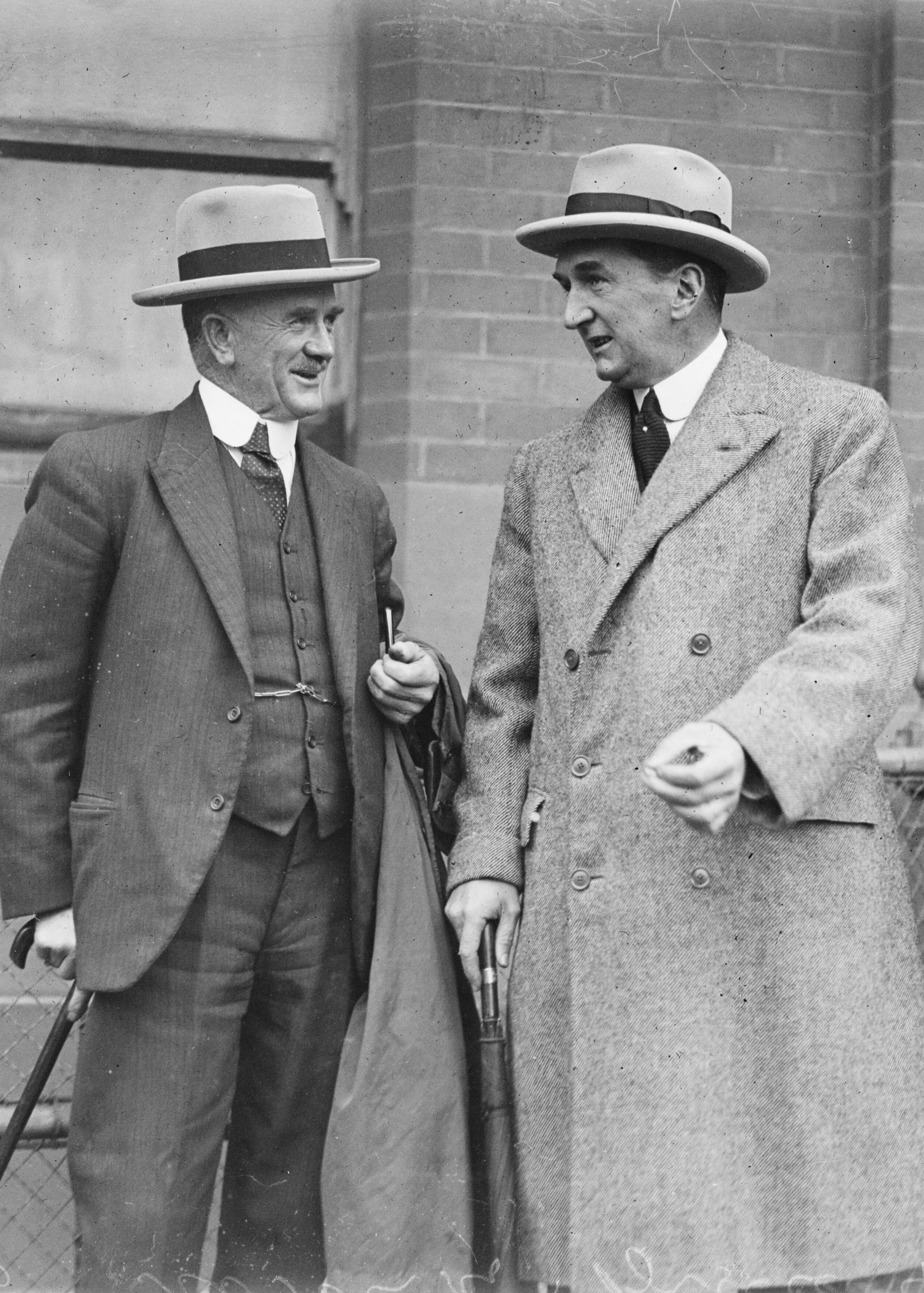
Gibson with Prime Minister Stanley Bruce

He successfully pressed for regulated wheat and dairy prices to be raised until the abolition of price controls in 1921. He was Postmaster-General from 1923 to 1929, and encouraged the construction of telephone lines, the extension of roadside mail deliveries and the building of post offices in country districts. He also encouraged the development of radio broadcasting. In 1928, he was appointed Minister for Works and Railways, as well.

Gibson was defeated with the Bruce-Page government at the 1929 elections and returned to farming. He won Corangamite back at the 1931 elections, but Joseph Lyons did not take the Country Party into his ministry.

=== Senate ===
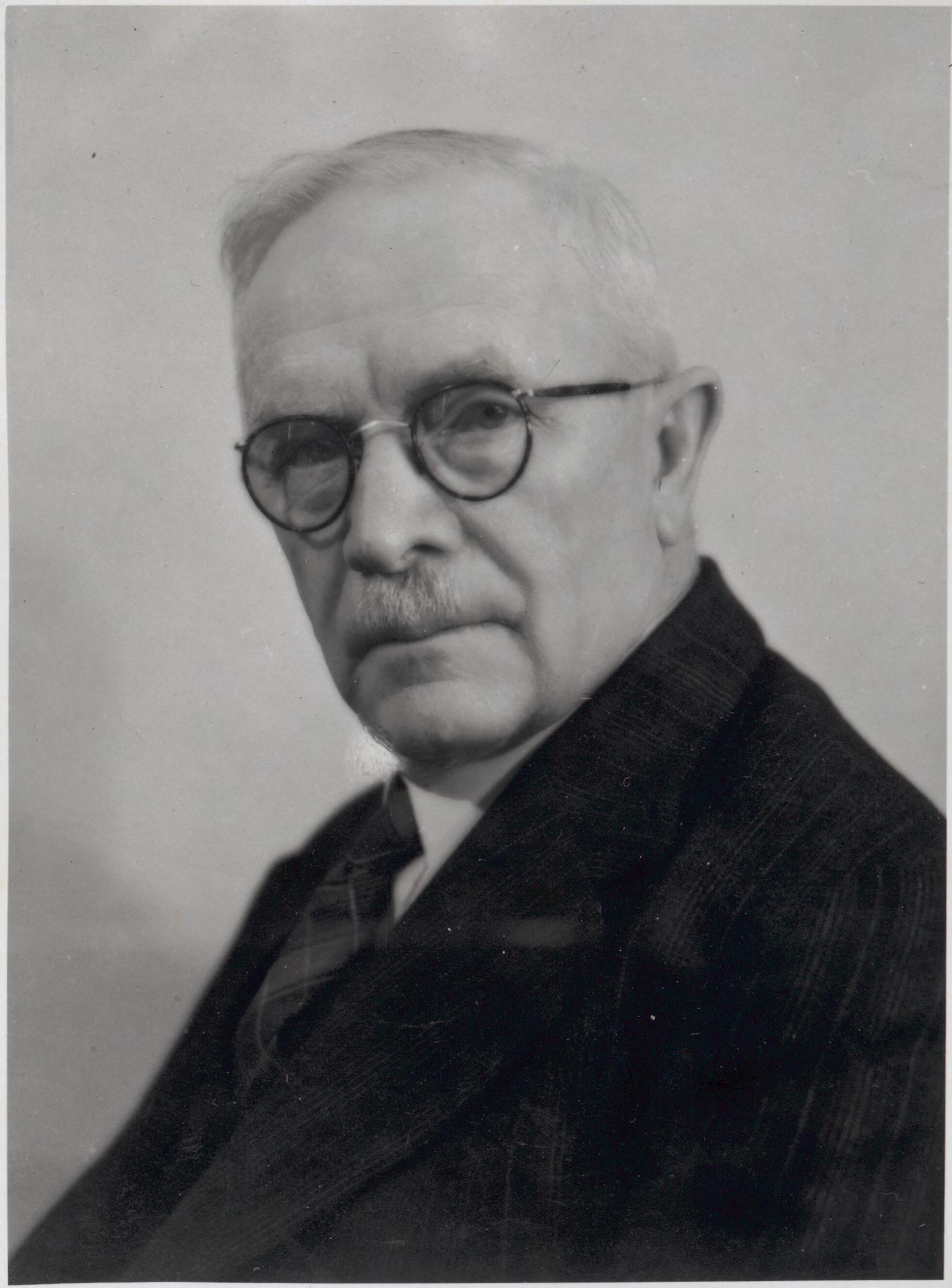
Gibson in 1940

At the 1934 elections, he was elected to the Senate and he remained a senator until he retired in 1947.

Gibson was elected to the Senate on a joint ticket with the UAP, with the support of the Victorian state executive of the Country Party. This was opposed by the federal executive, which endorsed the sitting Country Party senator Robert Elliott; he lost his seat. Gibson took his seat on 1 July 1935 as a member of the Country Party. However, on 23 September the parliamentary party voted to expel him. He subsequently sat as an "Independent Country" senator. He was not re-admitted to the party until November 1939, when the new leader Archie Cameron invited him to rejoin.

In 1941, Gibson was elected chair of the Joint Committee on Wireless Broadcasting, which came to be known as the Gibson Committee due to his "vigorous leadership". Its report led to the passage of the Broadcasting Act 1942 by the Curtin government.

== Later life ==
Gibson retired to "Cluan", his home in Lismore, and in retirement enjoyed fishing, shooting, and golf. He died at the Lismore Bush Nursing Hospital on 22 May 1955, aged 86. He was survived by his son David and daughter Margaret, having been widowed in 1944. His daughter Grace died suddenly in 1946 at the age of 48; she had been his private secretary for 20 years.

== Notes ==
Parliament of Australia
Preceded by Chester Manifold	Member for Corangamite; 1918–1929	Succeeded by Richard Crouch
Preceded by Richard Crouch	Member for Corangamite; 1931–1934	Succeeded by Geoffrey Street
Political offices
Preceded by Alexander Poynton	Postmaster-General; 1923–1929	Succeeded by Joseph Lyons
Preceded by William Hill	Minister for Works and Railways; 1928–1929	Succeeded by Joseph Lyons
Party political offices
Preceded by William Fleming	Deputy Leader of the Country Party of Australia; 1923–1929	Succeeded by Thomas Paterson
