= George Bowden (Australian politician) =

Australian politician and soldier (1888–1962)

George Bowden MC
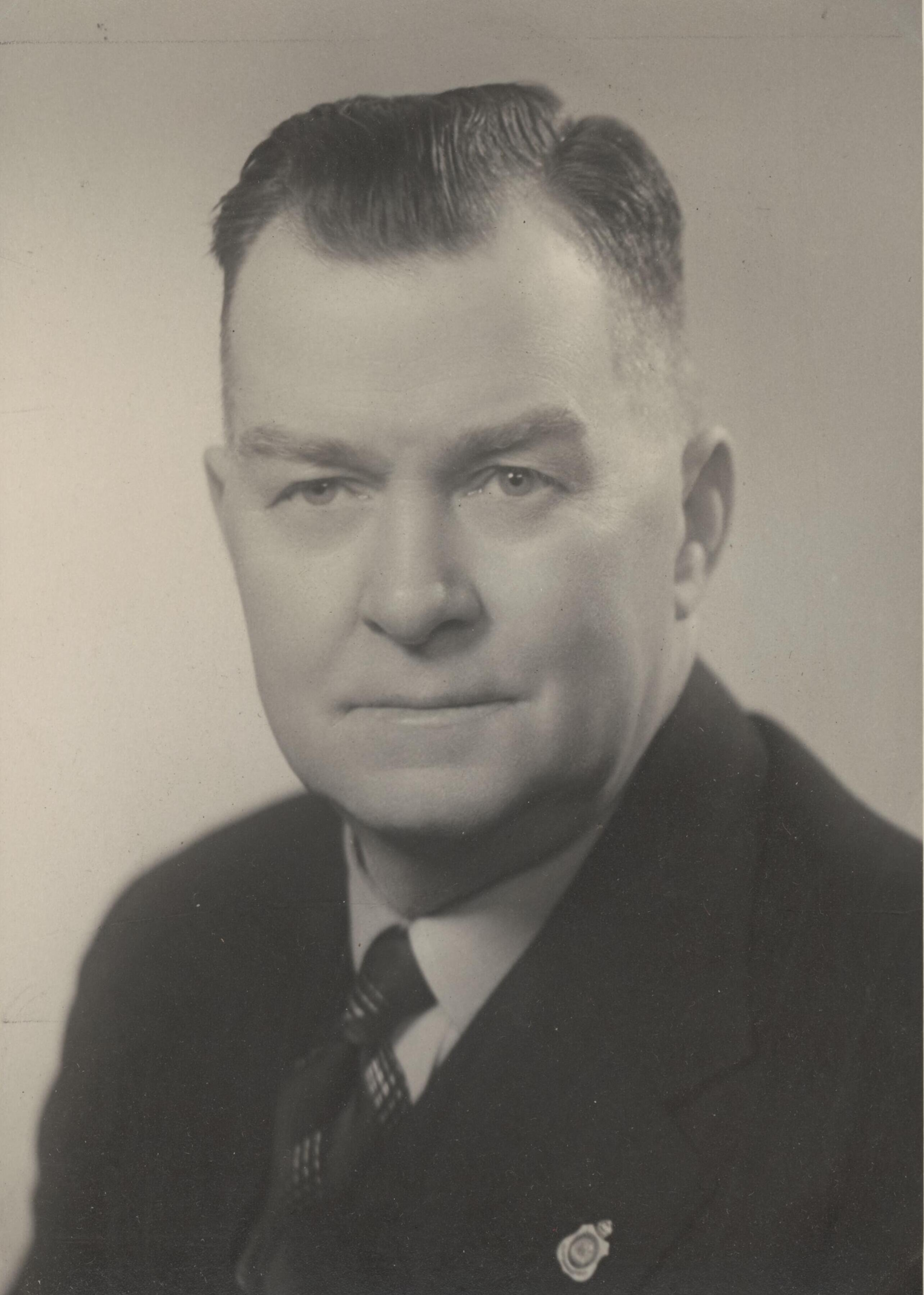

Member of the Australian Parliament for Gippsland
- In office 21 August 1943 – 2 November 1961
- Preceded by: Thomas Paterson
- Succeeded by: Peter Nixon

Personal details
- Born: 17 March 1888 Moyhu, Victoria, Australia
- Died: 8 June 1962 (aged 74) Heidelberg, Victoria, Australia
- Party: Country
- Occupation: Farmer

George James Bowden MC (17 March 1888 – 8 June 1962) was an Australian politician and soldier. He was a member of the House of Representatives from 1943 to 1961, representing the Victorian seat of Gippsland for the Country Party. He served as chairman of committees (deputy speaker) from 1959 to 1961.

== Early life ==
Bowden was born on 17 March 1888 in Moyhu, Victoria. He was the son of Catherine Christine (née McCalman) and William Henry Bowden, a farmer.

Bowden was educated at state schools at Whitfield and Benalla. After leaving school he moved to Melbourne where he worked as a labourer and commission agent. Bowden enlisted in the Australian Imperial Force in March 1915 and served with the 24th Battalion on the Gallipoli campaign. He later served on the Western Front and was promoted captain in January 1918. He was awarded the Military Cross for "his daring reconnaissance under fire and leadership in attack" at the Battle of Mont Saint-Quentin in September 1918. He was gassed and wounded during the war which affected his health in later life.

Bowden was demobilised in 1919 and began farming at Koo Wee Rup. His farm was repossessed by its mortgagee in 1932 during the Great Depression, after which he took up another property through a soldier settlement scheme. In 1939, Bowden was remobilised to the military as a captain in the 3rd Garrison Battalion, a coastal defence unit based in Queenscliff. He later served briefly with Headquarters Southern Command then in 1941 was transferred to the 9th Garrison Battalion. He commanded that unit from March 1942 to December 1943 with the temporary rank of lieutenant-colonel.

== Politics ==
In 1923, Bowden joined the Victorian Country Party, later renamed the United Country Party of Victoria (UCP). He served on the Cranbourne Shire Council from 1928 to 1938, including as shire president from 1930 to 1931. He stood unsuccessfully for the Victorian Legislative Assembly at the 1935 and 1937 state elections.

During the UCP split of the late 1930s, Bowden aligned himself with Albert Hocking's UCP faction which opposed the federal coalition with the United Australia Party and sought to make the state parliamentary party subordinate to the state executive. He was elected vice-president of the UCP in 1939 and served as state president from 1940 to 1943. At the 1940 federal election he stood unsuccessfully for the seat of Gippsland, running as the UCP-endorsed candidate against the incumbent member Thomas Paterson, who was associated with the Liberal Country Party splinter group.

Bowden was elected to the House of Representatives at the 1943 federal election, retaining Gippsland for the Country Party following Paterson's retirement. His first term in parliament overlapped with his military service; he was one of nine sitting MPs to serve in the military during World War II. He was re-elected on six further occasions, retiring prior to the 1961 election.

Bowden had a "solid rather than spectacular" parliamentary career but was "a regular and eloquent contributor to debates, including through sharp interjections". He served on a number of parliamentary committees, including on the Joint Statutory Committee on Public Works from 1950 to 1958. He was chairman of committees from 1959 to 1961 and regularly presided over the House.

== Personal life ==
Bowden was unmarried. He retired to his home in Murrumbeena and was cared for by his sister prior to his death on 8 June 1962 at the Repatriation General Hospital, Heidelberg.

Parliament of Australia
Preceded by Thomas Paterson	Member for Gippsland; 1943-1961	Succeeded by Peter Nixon
