= Alexander Poynton =

Australian politician

The Honourable Alexander Poynton OBE
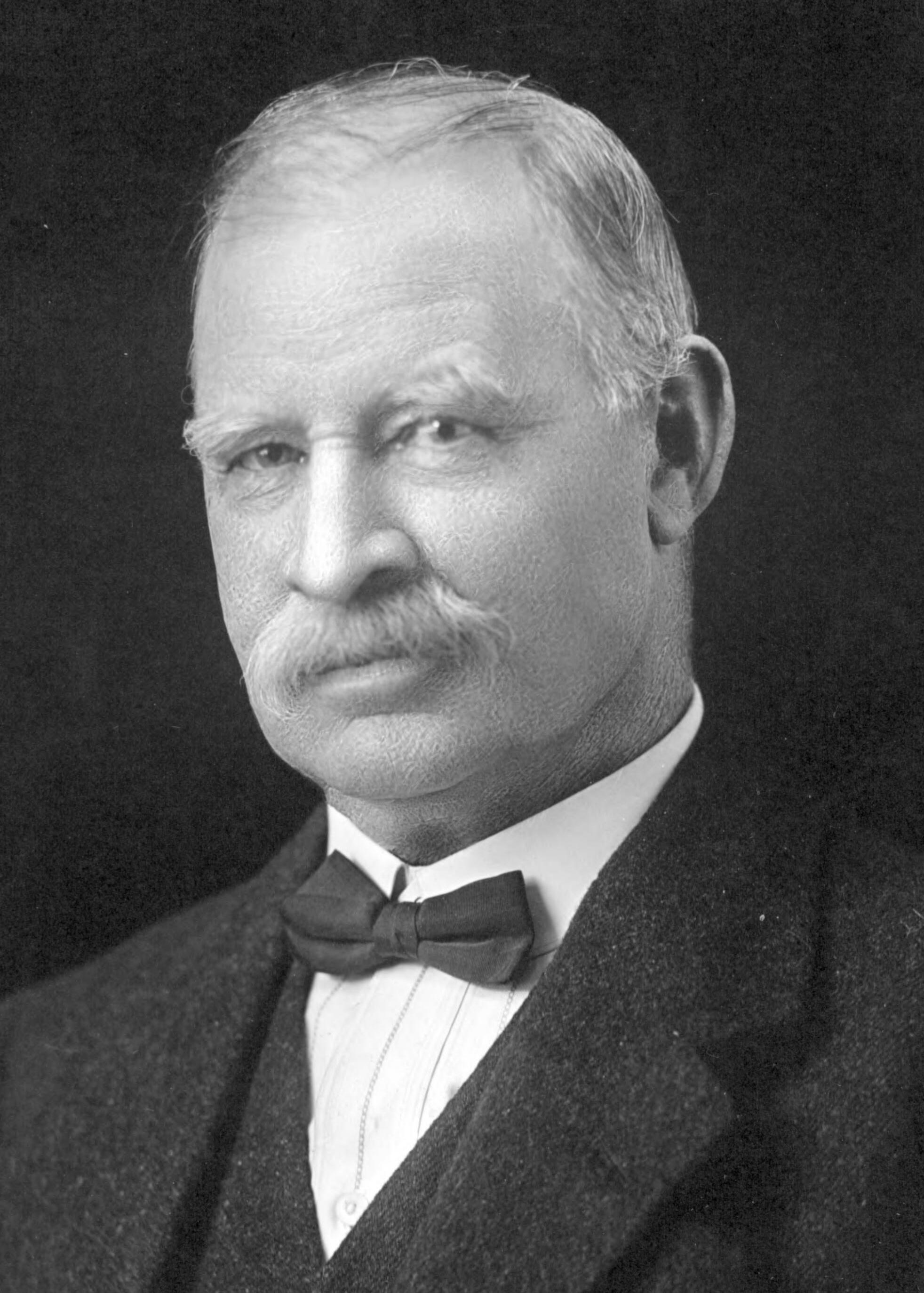

Postmaster-General of Australia
- In office 21 December 1921 – 5 February 1923
- Prime Minister: Billy Hughes
- Preceded by: George Wise
- Succeeded by: William Gibson

Minister for Home and Territories
- In office 3 February 1920 – 21 December 1921
- Prime Minister: Billy Hughes
- Preceded by: Paddy Glynn
- Succeeded by: George Pearce

Treasurer of Australia
- In office 14 November 1916 – 16 February 1917
- Prime Minister: Billy Hughes
- Preceded by: William Higgs
- Succeeded by: John Forrest

Member of the Australian Parliament for Grey
- In office 16 December 1903 – 16 December 1922
- Preceded by: New seat
- Succeeded by: Andrew Lacey

Member of the Australian Parliament for South Australia
- In office 30 March 1901 – 16 December 1903 Serving with Lee Batchelor, Langdon Bonython, Paddy Glynn, Frederick Holder, Charles Kingston, Vaiben Louis Solomon
- Preceded by: New seat
- Succeeded by: Seat abolished

Personal details
- Born: 8 August 1853 Castlemaine, Victoria, Australia
- Died: 9 January 1935 (aged 81) Toorak Gardens, South Australia, Australia
- Party: Ind. Labor (1893–1901); Free Trade (1901–04); Labor (1904–16); National Labor (1916–17); Nationalist (1917–22)
- Spouse: Harriet Brown
- Occupation: Shearer, miner

Alexander Poynton OBE (8 August 1853 – 9 January 1935) was an Australian politician. He held ministerial office under Prime Minister Billy Hughes, serving as Treasurer (1916–1917), Minister for Home and Territories (1920–1921), and Postmaster-General (1921–1923).

Poynton was a shearer and union leader before entering politics. He served in the South Australian House of Assembly (1893–1901) as a supporter of the labour movement before winning election to the House of Representatives at the 1901 federal election. Following the Australian Labor Party split of 1916 he followed Hughes into the Nationalist Party. He lost his seat at the 1922 election.

== Early life ==
Poynton was born on 8 August 1853 in Castlemaine, Victoria. He was the son of Rosanna (née McFadden) and Alexander Poynton; his mother was Irish and his father was from Liverpool, England. He left school at the age of 14 and subsequently worked as a miner, station-hand, and shearer.

Poynton was involved in the Australian labour movement from its beginnings. He was president of the Creswick branch of the Amalgamated Miners' Association and in 1886 became the inaugural treasurer of the Amalgamated Shearers' Union of Australasia (ASU). The following year he moved to Port Augusta, South Australia, to work as an ASU organiser. He was secretary of the local branch.

== Colonial politics ==
With his support in the labour movement, Poynton unsuccessfully stood for the South Australian House of Assembly seat of Newcastle at the 1890 election, before his election to the adjacent seat of Flinders at the 1893 election, serving as an independent Labor MP. As an Independent Labor MP he attended the United Labor Party caucus meetings without being bound by its decisions, but supported it in divisions.

By 1899, however, disaffection with Premier Charles Kingston led him to cross the floor with four others to defeat his ministry, citing Kingston's overbearing nature and his tardiness in implementing adequate land reforms as motives. His actions earned him a place as Commissioner for Crown Lands in the Solomon ministry in 1899, which lasted only eight days. Poynton's decisive role in ousting Kingston lost him many Labor friends.

He served in the House of Assembly until 1901.

== Federal politics ==
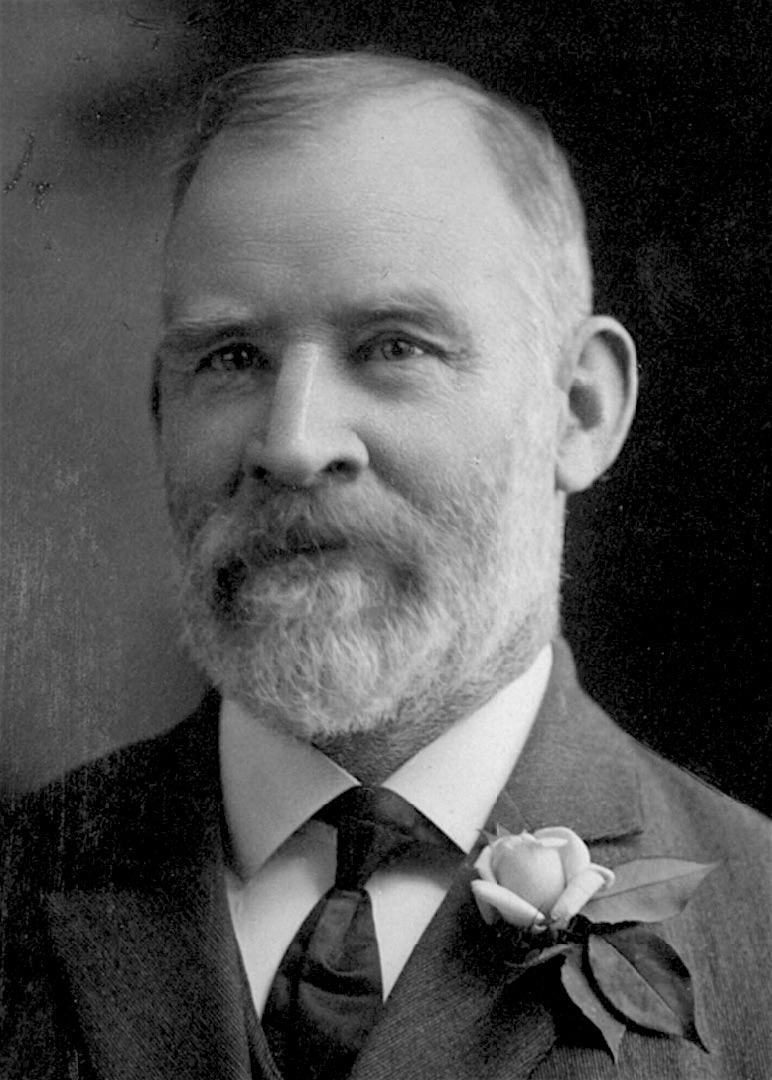
Poynton in 1908 wearing a socialist rose

In 1901 Poynton successfully stood for the Australian House of Representatives in the inaugural federal election as a Free Trade Party member for the Division of South Australia (which was not divided into electorates). Though labelled a Free Trader, he was actually an Australasian National League (National Defence League) candidate. At the 1903 election, South Australia was split into single-member electorates, and Poynton was elected as the first member for the Division of Grey in the vast northern region of South Australia. In May 1904 he became a pledged Labour member.

During his time in parliament Poynton served variously as a member of the royal commission on stripper harvesters, chairman of committees, Treasurer, Minister for Home and Territories and Postmaster-General. Among his political achievements was the establishment of a railway between Port Augusta and Western Australia, for which he lobbied nearly 18 years.

During fiery internal party debates on the issue of conscription during World War I, Poynton became a strong conscriptionist. Along with several other pro-conscription Labor members, he left the party in November 1916 in support of Labor leader and Prime Minister Billy Hughes to help found first the National Labor Party and later the Nationalist Party. Appointed OBE in 1920 for his work on repatriation issues, Poynton was defeated at the 1922 election.

== Personal life ==
In 1880, Poynton married Harriet Brown, with whom he had eight children. He was predeceased by three sons – one was killed in the Second Boer War and one during World War I, while another died in 1929.

Poynton died on 9 January 1935 in Toorak Gardens, South Australia, aged 81. He was buried in North Road Cemetery.

== Sources ==
- Hawkins, John (2008). "Alexander Poynton — the caretaker". Economic Round-up. 4. Department of the Treasury: 125–129.

Political offices
Preceded by William Higgs	Treasurer of Australia; 1916–1917	Succeeded by Sir John Forrest
Preceded by Paddy Glynn	Minister for Home and Territories; 1920–1921	Succeeded by George Pearce
Preceded by George Wise	Postmaster-General; 1921–1923	Succeeded by William Gibson
Parliament of Australia
New division	Member for South Australia; 1901–1903; Served alongside: Batchelor, Bonython, Glynn, Holder, Kingston, Solomon	Divided into single- member divisions
New division	Member for Grey; 1903–1922	Succeeded by Andrew Lacey
