= George Wise (Australian politician) =

Australian politician

The Honourable George Wise
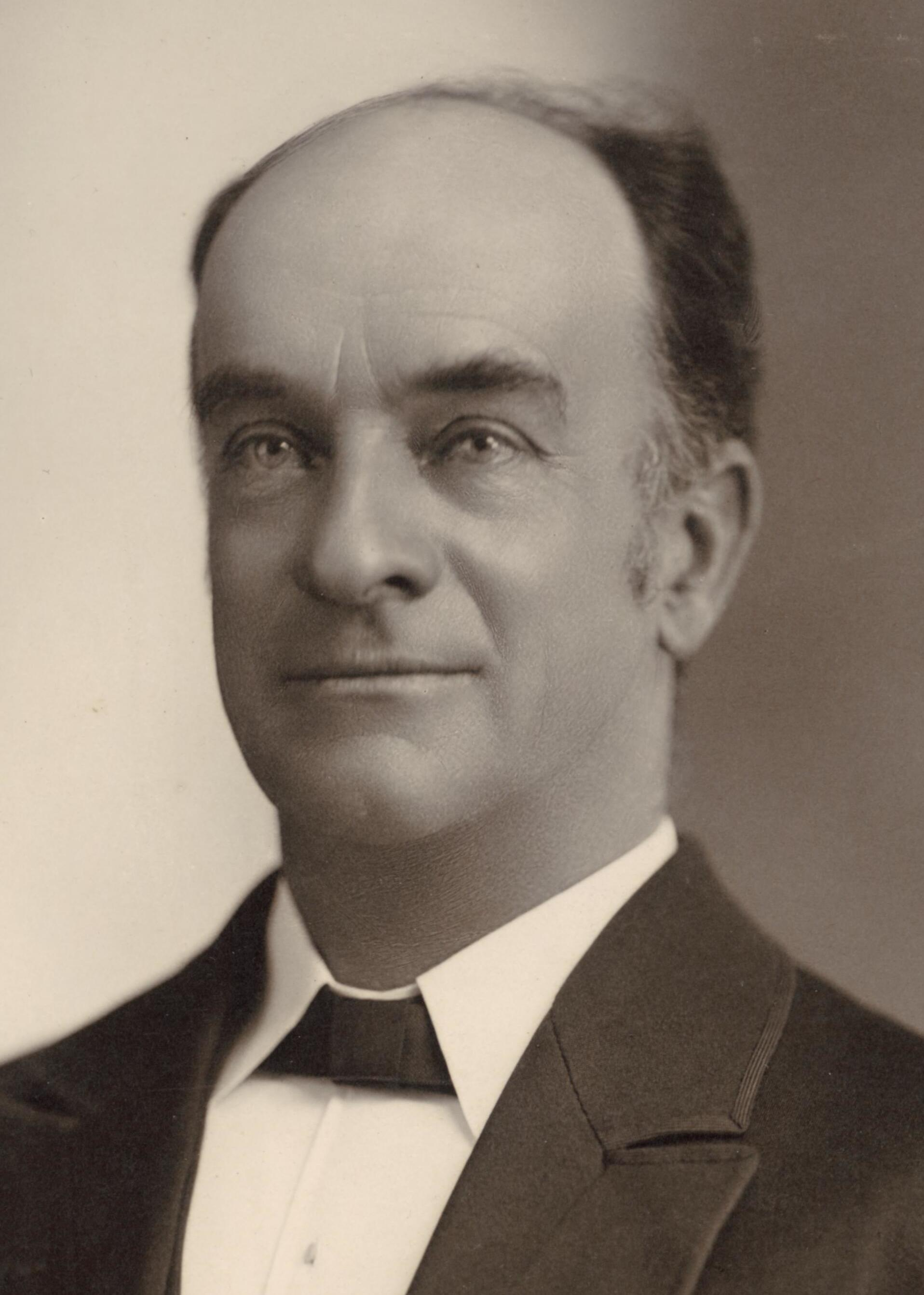

Postmaster-General of Australia
- In office 3 February 1920 – 21 December 1921
- Prime Minister: Billy Hughes
- Preceded by: William Webster
- Succeeded by: Alexander Poynton

Member of the Australian Parliament for Gippsland
- In office 5 September 1914 – 16 December 1922
- Preceded by: James Bennett
- Succeeded by: Thomas Paterson
- In office 12 December 1906 – 31 May 1913
- Preceded by: Allan McLean
- Succeeded by: James Bennett

Personal details
- Born: 1 July 1853 Melbourne, Victoria, Australia
- Died: 31 July 1950 (aged 97) Sale, Victoria, Australia
- Party: Independent Liberal (1910–1913, 1928)
- Other political affiliations: Protectionist (1906–09); Independent Labor (1914); Nationalist (1917–22); Independent Nationalist (1925)
- Spouse: Mary Thornton
- Occupation: Lawyer

George Henry Wise (1 July 1853 – 31 July 1950) was an Australian politician. He held the Division of Gippsland in federal parliament (1906–1913, 1914–1922) and served as Postmaster-General (1920–1921) under Prime Minister Billy Hughes. He was a lawyer by profession.

== Early life ==
Wise was born in Melbourne and educated at Scotch College from the age of five until he matriculated in 1868. He became an articled clerk and was admitted to the bar in September 1874, setting up his own practice in Sale in 1877. He married Mary Thornton (née Smith) in 1880.

He was a member of Sale Borough Council from 1880 to 1904 and was mayor six times. He established the Sale branch of the Australian Natives' Association (ANA) in 1886 and became president of the Victorian branch of the ANA in 1891.

George Wise was born in Melbourne, the eldest child of James Wise, hairdresser, and his wife Mary Macintosh, both from Edinburgh. His biographer writes that George, ‘a slight, wiry child’, was sent ‘as a 5-year-old to Scotch College, Melbourne, where he remained until matriculating in 1868, failing to excel in anything the school then considered important’. He studied law as an articled clerk, was admitted to the Bar in 1874, worked in Sale as a solicitor's clerk, and began his own practice in 1877. In 1880 he married Mary Thornton, née Smith. In 1880 he was elected to the local municipal council and held that position for 24 years, serving as mayor 6 times.

== Political career ==
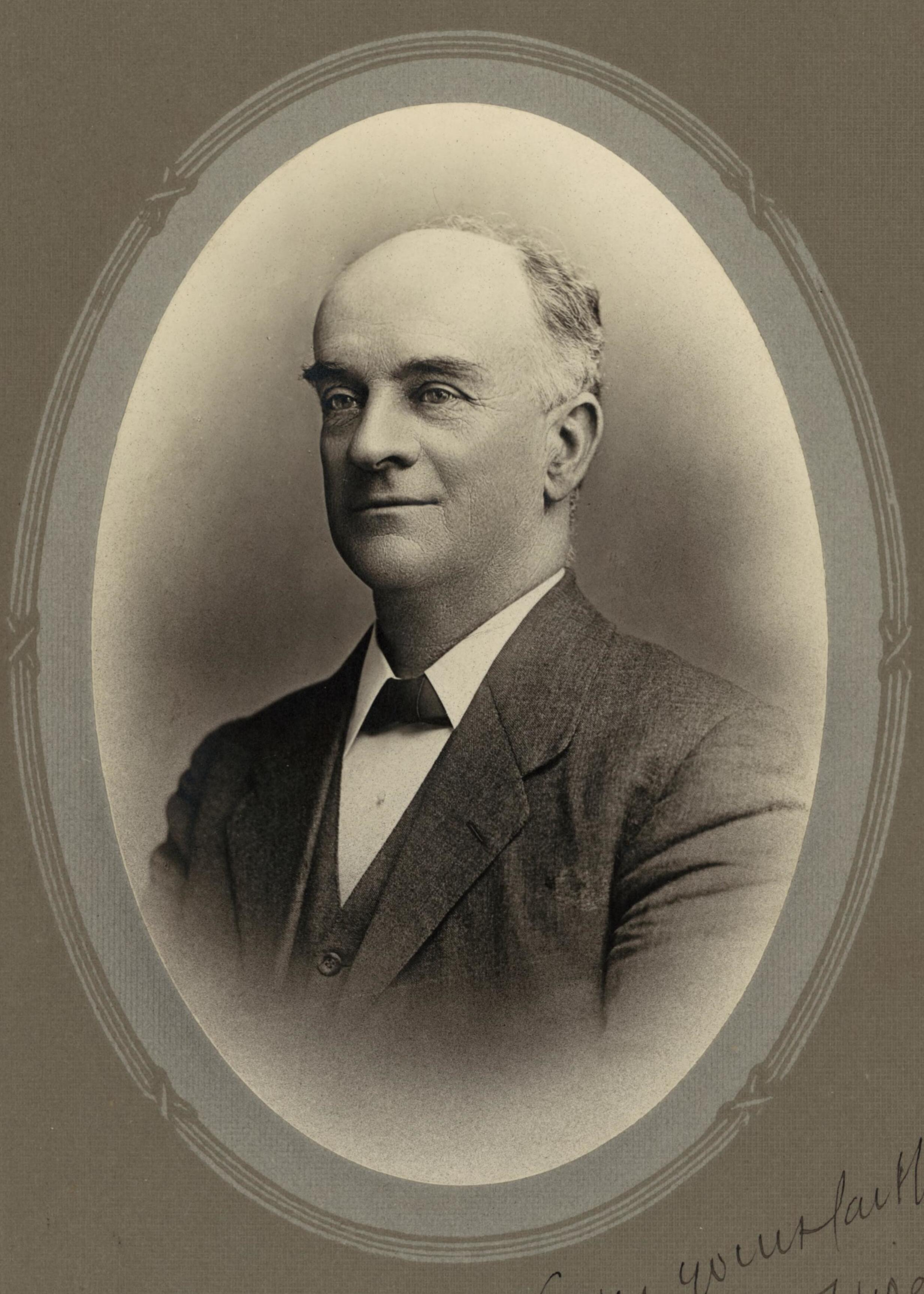
Wise in 1917

Wise was a strong supporter of the federation of Australia, and stood unsuccessfully for election to the Victorian Legislative Assembly in 1892, 1894 and 1904. He also failed win election to the Australian Senate in both the 1901 election and 1903 election. Wise stood unsuccessfully for parliament no less than five times before narrowly winning the House of Representatives seat of Gippsland in 1906, by 97 votes, standing as a Protectionist. He did not follow Deakin into fusion with the Liberals in 1909, rather standing as an Independent in 1910, gaining 62 percent of the vote against the Liberal candidate. Subsequently, he often supported the Australian Labor Party, but did not join it. Fusion Liberal candidate James Bennett beat him at the 1913 election, but Wise won Gippsland back in 1914, standing as an "Independent Labor" candidate.

In 1906 when George Wise when was first elected to parliament a journalist described him as ‘a small figure, [with] a picturesquely bald head, two bright and restless eyes, and a mouth with a distinctly humorous twist to it’ – and always ‘an industrious political organiser’. Wise recalled that he got a taste for politics by watching the great democrat George Higinbotham debate in the legislative assembly in the late 1860s. Certainly Wise's politics were always progressive. In 1887 when he was both the Mayor of Sale and the President of the Sale branch of the ANA, he told a meeting of the branch that ‘The wealthier or so-called upper classes can no longer treat the laboring and poorer classes as so much machinery to be worked at high pressure ... Man must begin to realise that his fellow man is a being like himself’.

On 22 February 1917, following the events of the Australian Labor Party split of 1916, Wise announced that he would support the Nationalist government that included many of his former Protectionist colleagues. He was easily re-elected at the 1917 election. Prime Minister Billy Hughes appointed him an honorary minister assisting the Minister for Defence from March 1918 to February 1920. He was Postmaster-General from February 1920 in the Fifth Hughes Ministry, but lost his position in the reshuffle when Stanley Bruce was brought into the ministry in December 1921. He was almost defeated in 1919 by a candidate from the newly formed the Country Party, and lost to the Country Party candidate, Thomas Paterson, in 1922. Wise failed to win the seat back in 1925 and 1928.

== Australian Natives' Association ==
George Henry Wise helped found the Sale branch of the Australian Natives' Association (ANA) in 1886, becoming its first president, and joined the board of directors in 1887. He was elected Chief President in 1892, and retained close links with the association for the next fifty years.

In 1887 he was both the mayor of Sale and the president of the Sale branch of the ANA. He became the Chief President of the ANA in 1891 and was a long-term member of the board of directors. Wise worked tirelessly to federate Australia on a democratic basis.

== Later life ==
He continued to practice as a solicitor until 1948, two years before his death at 97 years of age. He died in Sale in 1950, survived by three daughters and a son.

Political offices
Preceded by William Webster	Postmaster-General; 1920–1921	Succeeded by Alexander Poynton
Parliament of Australia
Preceded by Allan McLean	Member for Gippsland; 1906–1913	Succeeded by James Bennett
Preceded by James Bennett	Member for Gippsland; 1914–1922	Succeeded by Thomas Paterson
