= Division of Gippsland =

Australian federal electoral division

Coordinates: 37.584°S 147.767°E

Gippsland Australian House of Representatives Division
- Interactive map of electorate boundaries from the 2025 federal election
- Created: 1901
- MP: Darren Chester
- Party: National
- Namesake: Gippsland
- Electors: 118,115 (2025)
- Area: 33,131 km^{2} (12,792.0 sq mi)
- Demographic: Rural
Electorates around Gippsland:
Indi	Eden-Monaro	Eden-Monaro
Monash	Gippsland	Bass Strait
Monash	Bass Strait	Bass Strait

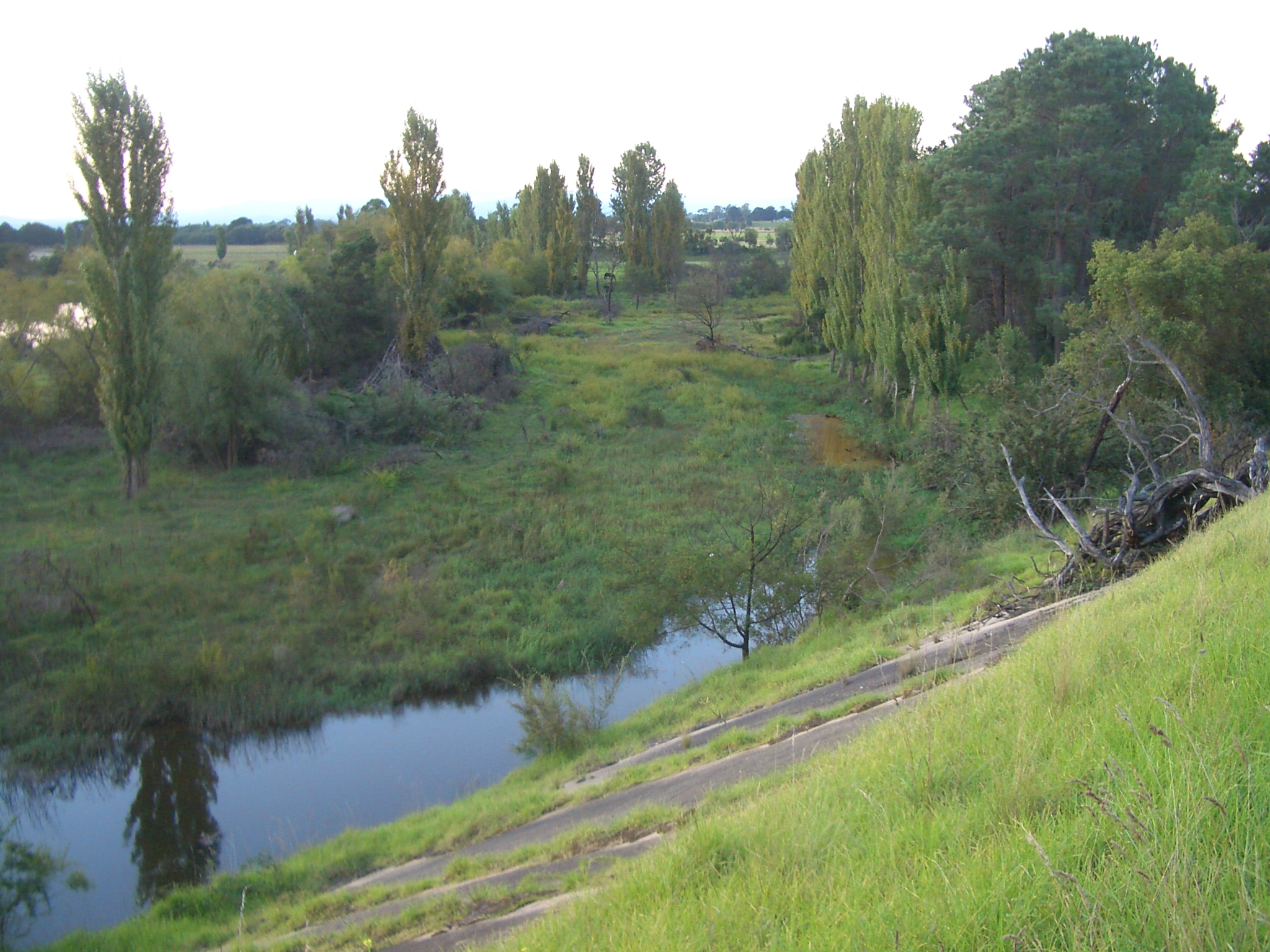
The Avon River located within Gippsland. The division takes its name from the region the river is located in.

The Division of Gippsland is an Australian electoral division in the state of Victoria. The division was proclaimed in 1900, and was one of the original 65 divisions to be contested at the first federal election. It is named for the Gippsland region of eastern Victoria, which in turn is named for Sir George Gipps, Governor of New South Wales 1838–1846.

As of 2025, it covers the entire Shire of East Gippsland and Shire of Wellington, majority of the City of Latrobe, and a small portion of Shire of Baw Baw (near the town of Yallourn North). It includes the towns and regional cities of Bairnsdale, Lakes Entrance, Morwell, Sale and Traralgon.

== Geography ==
Since 1984, federal electoral division boundaries in Australia have been determined at redistributions by a redistribution committee appointed by the Australian Electoral Commission. Redistributions occur for the boundaries of divisions in a particular state, and they occur every seven years, or sooner if a state's representation entitlement changes or when divisions of a state are malapportioned.

Between 1906 and 1937, the division progressively gained South Gippsland areas from the Division of Flinders, extending as far as San Remo (near Phillip Island but not including) in 1937. In 1949, San Remo, along with some other areas in South Gippsland, as well as Gippsland areas west of Traralgon (but not inclusive), were lost to become part of the new Division of McMillan.

In 2003, the division lost all areas in the South Gippsland Shire to the Division of McMillan, but gained Morwell and Traralgon from the latter. In 2010, it had a minor boundary change, losing a small part of Yallourn to the Division of McMillan. In 2018, it had another minor boundary change, gaining Yallourn North from the abolished Division of McMillan (renamed Division of Monash). This gain also included unpopulated areas around the town that were within the Shire of Baw Baw. As of 2025, this was the division's latest boundary change. It did not undergo any boundary changes in the 2021 and 2024 redistributions.

As of the 2024 redistribution, it covers the entire Shire of East Gippsland and Shire of Wellington, the majority of City of Latrobe, and a tiny and unpopulated area of Shire of Baw Baw near Yallourn North. It includes the towns and regional cities of Bairnsdale, Lakes Entrance, Morwell, Sale and Traralgon. It also includes Yallourn North in Shire of Baw Baw. However, it does not include Moe, which is in the City of Latrobe but is in the neighbouring Division of Monash.

== History ==
It is one of two original divisions in Victoria to have never elected a Labor-endorsed member, the other being Kooyong. It has been held by the National Party and its predecessor, the Country Party, since 1922: it is the only seat the party has held continuously since its creation. On its new boundaries, however, it takes in most of the industrial Latrobe Valley.

Prominent former members include Allan McLean, a former Premier of Victoria who served as a minister under George Reid; and Peter Nixon, a senior minister in the Coalition governments from Harold Holt to Malcolm Fraser.

Then-sitting MP Peter McGauran announced his resignation in April 2008, sparking a June 2008 by-election, with the three major parties all contesting the election. The Nationals retained the seat on an increased margin, electing Darren Chester.

== Members ==
Image	Member	Party	Term	Notes
	Allan McLean (1840–1911)	Protectionist	29 March 1901 – 12 December 1906	Previously held the Victorian Legislative Assembly seat of Gippsland North. Served as minister under Reid. Lost seat
	George Wise (1853–1950)	Protectionist	12 December 1906 – 26 May 1909	Lost seat
	George Wise (1853–1950)	Independent Liberal	26 May 1909 – 31 May 1913	Lost seat
	James Bennett (1874–1951)	Liberal	31 May 1913 – 5 September 1914	Lost seat
	George Wise (1853–1950)	Independent Labor	5 September 1914 – 22 February 1917	Served as minister under Hughes. Lost seat
	George Wise (1853–1950)	Nationalist	22 February 1917 – 16 December 1922	Served as minister under Hughes. Lost seat
	Thomas Paterson (1882–1952)	Country	16 December 1922 – 7 July 1943	Served as minister under Bruce and Lyons. Retired
	George Bowden (1888–1962)	Country	21 August 1943 – 2 November 1961	Retired
	Peter Nixon (1928–2025)	Country	9 December 1961 – 2 May 1975	Served as minister under Holt, McEwen, Gorton, McMahon and Fraser. Retired
	Peter Nixon (1928–2025)	National Country	2 May 1975 – 16 October 1982	Served as minister under Holt, McEwen, Gorton, McMahon and Fraser. Retired
	Peter Nixon (1928–2025)	Nationals	16 October 1982 – 4 February 1983	Served as minister under Holt, McEwen, Gorton, McMahon and Fraser. Retired
	Peter McGauran (1955–)	Nationals	5 March 1983 – 9 April 2008	Served as minister under Howard. Resigned to retire from politics
	Darren Chester (1967–)	Nationals	28 June 2008 – present	Served as minister under Turnbull and Morrison. Incumbent

== Election results ==
2025 Australian federal election: Gippsland
Party	Candidate	Votes	%	±%
National	Darren Chester	55,036	52.54	−1.60
Labor	Sonny Stephens	22,291	21.28	+2.05
One Nation	Gregory Hansford	15,118	14.43	+5.07
Greens	Rochelle Hine	8,897	8.49	+0.02
Libertarian	Simon Wilson	3,416	3.26	−0.99
Total formal votes		104,758	96.41	−0.63
Informal votes		3,904	3.59	+0.63
Turnout		108,662	92.03	+3.67
Two-party-preferred result
National	Darren Chester	72,656	69.36	−1.21
Labor	Sonny Stephens	32,102	30.64	+1.21
National hold		Swing	−1.21	
