= Electoral results for the Division of Perth =

Australian division election results

This is a list of electoral results for the Division of Perth in Australian federal elections from the division's creation in 1901 until the present.

== Members ==
| Member | Party | Term |
|---|---|---|
| James Fowler | Labour | 1901–1909 |
| James Fowler | Liberal | 1909–1917 |
| James Fowler | Nationalist | 1917–1922 |
| Edward Mann | Nationalist | 1922–1929 |
| Edward Mann | Independent Nationalist | 1929 |
| Walter Nairn | Nationalist | 1929–1931 |
| Walter Nairn | United Australia | 1931–1943 |
| Tom Burke | Labor | 1943–1955 |
| Fred Chaney Sr. | Liberal | 1955–1969 |
| Joe Berinson | Labor | 1969–1975 |
| Ross McLean | Liberal | 1975–1983 |
| Dr Ric Charlesworth | Labor | 1983–1993 |
| Stephen Smith | Labor | 1993–2013 |
| Alannah MacTiernan | Labor | 2013–2016 |
| Tim Hammond | Labor | 2016–2018 |
| Patrick Gorman | Labor | 2018–present |

== Election results ==
=== Elections in the 2020s ===
==== 2025 ====
2025 Australian federal election: Perth
| Party | Candidate | Votes | % | ±% |
|---|---|---|---|---|
| One Nation | Peter Hallifax | | | |
| Liberal | Susanna Panaia | | | |
| Greens | Sophie Greer | | | |
| Labor | Patrick Gorman | | | |
| Total formal votes | | | | |
| Informal votes | | | | |
| Turnout | | | | |

==== 2022 ====
2022 Australian federal election: Perth
| Party | Candidate | Votes | % | ±% |
|---|---|---|---|---|
| Labor | Patrick Gorman | 40,066 | 39.25 | +5.66 |
| Liberal | David Dwyer | 27,294 | 26.74 | −12.24 |
| Greens | Caroline Perks | 22,621 | 22.16 | +3.79 |
| One Nation | Cameron Bailey | 2,749 | 2.69 | −0.03 |
| Western Australia | Dave Vos | 1,878 | 1.84 | −0.57 |
| United Australia | Sonya Eberhart | 1,605 | 1.57 | −0.23 |
| Animal Justice | Sarah Szmekura-Moor | 1,535 | 1.50 | +1.50 |
| Christians | Dean Powell | 1,514 | 1.48 | +1.09 |
| Liberal Democrats | Evan Nickols | 1,407 | 1.38 | +1.38 |
| Federation | Aiden Gyuru | 710 | 0.70 | +0.70 |
| Great Australian | Sean Connor | 702 | 0.69 | +0.69 |
| Total formal votes | | 102,081 | 94.42 | −1.20 |
| Informal votes | | 6,028 | 5.58 | +1.20 |
| Turnout | | 108,109 | 88.19 | −1.34 |
Two-party-preferred result
| Labor | Patrick Gorman | 66,151 | 64.80 | +11.57 |
| Liberal | David Dwyer | 35,930 | 35.20 | −11.57 |
| Labor hold | | Swing | +11.57 | |

Alluvial diagram for preference flows in the seat of Perth in the 2022 federal election. indicates at what stage the winning candidate had over 50% of the votes and was declared the winner.

=== Elections in the 2010s ===
==== 2019 ====
2019 Australian federal election: Perth
| Party | Candidate | Votes | % | ±% |
|---|---|---|---|---|
| Liberal | Jim Grayden | 32,800 | 37.40 | −4.91 |
| Labor | Patrick Gorman | 30,207 | 34.44 | −2.92 |
| Greens | Caroline Perks | 16,552 | 18.87 | +1.80 |
| One Nation | Mel Lownds | 2,333 | 2.66 | +2.66 |
| Western Australia | Jane Boxall | 2,222 | 2.53 | +2.53 |
| United Australia | Chas Hopkins | 1,661 | 1.89 | +1.89 |
| Science | Gary Davies | 1,329 | 1.52 | +1.52 |
| VOTEFLUX.ORG | Curtis Greening | 602 | 0.69 | +0.69 |
| Total formal votes | | 87,706 | 95.41 | −0.82 |
| Informal votes | | 4,220 | 4.59 | +0.82 |
| Turnout | | 91,926 | 90.65 | +2.61 |
Two-party-preferred result
| Labor | Patrick Gorman | 48,176 | 54.93 | +1.60 |
| Liberal | Jim Grayden | 39,530 | 45.07 | −1.60 |
| Labor hold | | Swing | +1.60 | |

==== 2018 ====
Perth by-election: 28 July 2018
| Party | Candidate | Votes | % | ±% |
|---|---|---|---|---|
| Labor | Patrick Gorman | 22,812 | 39.33 | +1.96 |
| Greens | Caroline Perks | 10,908 | 18.81 | +1.74 |
| Independent | Paul Collins | 5,516 | 9.51 | +9.51 |
| Liberal Democrats | Wesley Du Preez | 3,880 | 6.69 | +4.98 |
| Independent | Julie Matheson | 3,123 | 5.38 | +5.38 |
| Independent Liberal | Jim Grayden | 2,565 | 4.42 | +4.42 |
| Animal Justice | Nicole Arielli | 1,815 | 3.13 | +3.13 |
| Independent | Ian Britza | 1,705 | 2.94 | +2.94 |
| Christians | Ellen Joubert | 1,474 | 2.54 | +2.54 |
| Science | Aaron Hammond | 1,002 | 1.73 | +1.73 |
| Mental Health | Ben Mullings | 930 | 1.60 | +1.60 |
| Sustainable Australia | Colin Scott | 774 | 1.33 | +1.33 |
| Liberty Alliance | Tony Robinson | 682 | 1.18 | +1.18 |
| Citizens Electoral Council | Barry Mason | 596 | 1.03 | +1.03 |
| People's Party | Gabriel Harfouche | 222 | 0.38 | +0.38 |
| Total formal votes | | 58,004 | 89.94 | −6.29 |
| Informal votes | | 6,486 | 10.06 | +6.29 |
| Turnout | | 64,490 | 64.07 | −23.97 |
Two-candidate-preferred result
| Labor | Patrick Gorman | 36,601 | 63.10 | +9.77 |
| Greens | Caroline Perks | 21,403 | 36.90 | +36.90 |
| Labor hold | | Swing | N/A | |

==== 2016 ====
2016 Australian federal election: Perth
| Party | Candidate | Votes | % | ±% |
|---|---|---|---|---|
| Liberal | Jeremy Quinn | 35,381 | 42.31 | +0.20 |
| Labor | Tim Hammond | 31,248 | 37.36 | −1.02 |
| Greens | Tim Clifford | 14,272 | 17.07 | +5.10 |
| Liberal Democrats | Mark Walmsley | 1,430 | 1.71 | +1.71 |
| Online Direct Democracy | Andrew Chambers | 1,300 | 1.55 | +1.55 |
| Total formal votes | | 83,631 | 96.23 | +1.12 |
| Informal votes | | 3,274 | 3.77 | −1.12 |
| Turnout | | 86,905 | 88.04 | −2.79 |
Two-party-preferred result
| Labor | Tim Hammond | 44,602 | 53.33 | +1.15 |
| Liberal | Jeremy Quinn | 39,029 | 46.67 | −1.15 |
| Labor hold | | Swing | +1.15 | |

==== 2013 ====
2013 Australian federal election: Perth
| Party | Candidate | Votes | % | ±% |
|---|---|---|---|---|
| Labor | Alannah MacTiernan | 34,215 | 41.25 | +1.06 |
| Liberal | Darryl Moore | 33,021 | 39.81 | +1.07 |
| Greens | Jonathan Hallett | 8,801 | 10.61 | −5.54 |
| Palmer United | Gabriel Harfouche | 2,897 | 3.49 | +3.49 |
| Christians | Paul Connelly | 1,891 | 2.28 | +2.28 |
| Independent | Ant Clark | 1,025 | 1.24 | +1.24 |
| Family First | Lesley Croll | 669 | 0.81 | −0.74 |
| Rise Up Australia | Evelyn Edney | 422 | 0.51 | +0.51 |
| Total formal votes | | 82,941 | 94.72 | −0.08 |
| Informal votes | | 4,625 | 5.28 | +0.08 |
| Turnout | | 87,566 | 91.96 | −0.08 |
Two-party-preferred result
| Labor | Alannah MacTiernan | 45,079 | 54.35 | −1.53 |
| Liberal | Darryl Moore | 37,862 | 45.65 | +1.53 |
| Labor hold | | Swing | −1.53 | |

==== 2010 ====
2010 Australian federal election: Perth
| Party | Candidate | Votes | % | ±% |
|---|---|---|---|---|
| Labor | Stephen Smith | 32,228 | 40.19 | −6.12 |
| Liberal | Joe Ferrante | 31,064 | 38.74 | +1.84 |
| Greens | Jonathan Hallett | 12,948 | 16.15 | +5.82 |
| Christian Democrats | Paul Connelly | 2,093 | 2.61 | +0.62 |
| Family First | Nigel Irvine | 1,243 | 1.55 | +0.45 |
| Socialist Alliance | Alex Bainbridge | 618 | 0.77 | +0.22 |
| Total formal votes | | 80,194 | 94.80 | −0.61 |
| Informal votes | | 4,400 | 5.20 | +0.61 |
| Turnout | | 84,594 | 92.05 | −1.14 |
Two-party-preferred result
| Labor | Stephen Smith | 44,815 | 55.88 | −2.06 |
| Liberal | Joe Ferrante | 35,379 | 44.12 | +2.06 |
| Labor hold | | Swing | −2.06 | |

=== Elections in the 2000s ===
==== 2007 ====
2007 Australian federal election: Perth
| Party | Candidate | Votes | % | ±% |
|---|---|---|---|---|
| Labor | Stephen Smith | 36,684 | 46.87 | +1.28 |
| Liberal | Daniel Nikolic | 28,163 | 35.98 | −0.90 |
| Greens | Damian Douglas-Meyer | 8,320 | 10.63 | +1.05 |
| Christian Democrats | Paul Connelly | 1,594 | 2.04 | −0.42 |
| Independent | Stephen Brooks | 1,413 | 1.81 | +1.81 |
| Family First | Sharon Fairfull | 838 | 1.07 | +1.07 |
| One Nation | Marie Edmonds | 628 | 0.80 | −1.19 |
| Socialist Alliance | Chris Latham | 464 | 0.59 | −0.75 |
| Citizens Electoral Council | Orm Girvan | 162 | 0.21 | −0.13 |
| Total formal votes | | 78,266 | 95.42 | +1.40 |
| Informal votes | | 3,757 | 4.58 | −1.40 |
| Turnout | | 82,023 | 93.03 | +0.10 |
Two-party-preferred result
| Labor | Stephen Smith | 46,061 | 58.85 | +2.12 |
| Liberal | Daniel Nikolic | 32,205 | 41.15 | −2.12 |
| Labor hold | | Swing | +2.12 | |

==== 2004 ====
2004 Australian federal election: Perth
| Party | Candidate | Votes | % | ±% |
|---|---|---|---|---|
| Labor | Stephen Smith | 33,532 | 45.59 | −2.29 |
| Liberal | Alexander Lawrance | 27,127 | 36.88 | +4.55 |
| Greens | Alison Xamon | 7,045 | 9.58 | +2.22 |
| Christian Democrats | Augustine Loh | 1,807 | 2.46 | +2.46 |
| One Nation | Marie Edmonds | 1,463 | 1.99 | −2.40 |
| Democrats | Ray Bradbury | 1,344 | 1.83 | −5.45 |
| Socialist Alliance | Nikki Ulasowski | 984 | 1.34 | +1.34 |
| Citizens Electoral Council | Ross Russell | 247 | 0.34 | +0.34 |
| Total formal votes | | 73,549 | 94.02 | −0.96 |
| Informal votes | | 4,680 | 5.98 | +0.96 |
| Turnout | | 78,229 | 92.93 | −1.92 |
Two-party-preferred result
| Labor | Stephen Smith | 41,723 | 56.73 | −4.48 |
| Liberal | Alexander Lawrance | 31,826 | 43.27 | +4.48 |
| Labor hold | | Swing | −4.48 | |

==== 2001 ====
2001 Australian federal election: Perth
| Party | Candidate | Votes | % | ±% |
|---|---|---|---|---|
| Labor | Stephen Smith | 35,389 | 47.88 | −1.88 |
| Liberal | Rod Webb | 23,894 | 32.33 | +1.95 |
| Greens | Alison Xamon | 5,437 | 7.36 | +1.27 |
| Democrats | Aaron Hewett | 5,381 | 7.28 | +2.63 |
| One Nation | Peter Gilberthorpe | 3,244 | 4.39 | −3.81 |
| | Philip Chilton | 568 | 0.77 | +0.77 |
| Total formal votes | | 73,913 | 94.98 | −1.18 |
| Informal votes | | 3,907 | 5.02 | +1.18 |
| Turnout | | 77,820 | 95.25 | |
Two-party-preferred result
| Labor | Stephen Smith | 45,239 | 61.21 | −1.33 |
| Liberal | Rod Webb | 28,674 | 38.79 | +1.33 |
| Labor hold | | Swing | −1.33 | |

=== Elections in the 1990s ===
==== 1998 ====
1998 Australian federal election: Perth
| Party | Candidate | Votes | % | ±% |
|---|---|---|---|---|
| Labor | Stephen Smith | 38,395 | 50.16 | +2.89 |
| Liberal | David Montani | 22,689 | 29.64 | −8.66 |
| One Nation | Kerry Mills | 6,555 | 8.56 | +8.56 |
| Greens | Gemma Carter | 4,713 | 6.16 | +0.24 |
| Democrats | Brendon Entrekin | 3,517 | 4.59 | −1.72 |
| Democratic Socialist | Iggy Kim | 682 | 0.89 | +0.89 |
| Total formal votes | | 76,551 | 96.11 | −0.03 |
| Informal votes | | 3,102 | 3.89 | +0.03 |
| Turnout | | 79,653 | 94.32 | +0.37 |
Two-party-preferred result
| Labor | Stephen Smith | 48,441 | 63.28 | +6.60 |
| Liberal | David Montani | 28,110 | 36.72 | −6.60 |
| Labor hold | | Swing | +6.60 | |

==== 1996 ====
1996 Australian federal election: Perth
| Party | Candidate | Votes | % | ±% |
|---|---|---|---|---|
| Labor | Stephen Smith | 32,018 | 47.56 | +1.19 |
| Liberal | Dee Kelly | 25,262 | 37.53 | −1.29 |
| Greens | Elena Jeffreys | 4,189 | 6.22 | +0.59 |
| Democrats | Jim Kerr | 4,175 | 6.20 | +3.88 |
| Independent | Raymond Conder | 914 | 1.36 | +1.36 |
| | Anthony Benbow | 418 | 0.62 | +0.62 |
| | Gary Nelson | 339 | 0.50 | +0.50 |
| Total formal votes | | 67,315 | 96.17 | −0.28 |
| Informal votes | | 2,678 | 3.83 | +0.28 |
| Turnout | | 69,993 | 93.95 | −1.04 |
Two-party-preferred result
| Labor | Stephen Smith | 37,756 | 56.46 | +0.31 |
| Liberal | Dee Kelly | 29,121 | 43.54 | −0.31 |
| Labor hold | | Swing | +0.31 | |

==== 1993 ====
1993 Australian federal election: Perth
| Party | Candidate | Votes | % | ±% |
|---|---|---|---|---|
| Labor | Stephen Smith | 31,585 | 46.37 | +3.79 |
| Liberal | Barney Cresswell | 26,440 | 38.82 | +1.20 |
| Greens | Patsy Molloy | 3,836 | 5.63 | −2.71 |
| Democrats | Irene Knight | 1,581 | 2.32 | −5.50 |
| Call to Australia | Chris Bignell | 1,499 | 2.20 | +2.20 |
| Independent | Peter Blurton | 1,460 | 2.14 | +2.14 |
| Independent | Michael Goff | 857 | 1.26 | +1.26 |
| | Michelle Hovane | 587 | 0.86 | +0.86 |
| Natural Law | Jennifer Benjamin | 268 | 0.39 | +0.39 |
| Total formal votes | | 68,113 | 96.45 | +1.21 |
| Informal votes | | 2,507 | 3.55 | −1.21 |
| Turnout | | 70,620 | 94.99 | |
Two-party-preferred result
| Labor | Stephen Smith | 38,202 | 56.15 | +0.97 |
| Liberal | Barney Cresswell | 29,839 | 43.85 | −0.97 |
| Labor hold | | Swing | +0.97 | |

==== 1990 ====
1990 Australian federal election: Perth
| Party | Candidate | Votes | % | ±% |
|---|---|---|---|---|
| Labor | Ric Charlesworth | 28,047 | 42.6 | −16.4 |
| Liberal | Marylyn Rodgers | 24,775 | 37.6 | −5.9 |
| Greens | Brenda Conochie | 5,496 | 8.3 | +8.3 |
| Democrats | Brian Jenkins | 5,152 | 7.8 | +7.8 |
| Democratic Socialist | Richard Cheuk | 1,211 | 1.8 | +1.8 |
| Grey Power | Don Gudgeon | 702 | 1.1 | +1.1 |
| National | William Witham | 483 | 0.7 | −4.0 |
| Total formal votes | | 65,866 | 95.2 | |
| Informal votes | | 3,292 | 4.8 | |
| Turnout | | 69,158 | 93.4 | |
Two-party-preferred result
| Labor | Ric Charlesworth | 36,252 | 55.2 | −5.2 |
| Liberal | Marylyn Rodgers | 29,455 | 44.8 | +5.2 |
| Labor hold | | Swing | −5.2 | |

=== Elections in the 1980s ===
==== 1987 ====
1987 Australian federal election: Perth
| Party | Candidate | Votes | % | ±% |
|---|---|---|---|---|
| Labor | Ric Charlesworth | 34,003 | 55.4 | +0.2 |
| Liberal | Bob Campbell | 24,494 | 39.9 | −2.3 |
| National | Ted Lisle | 2,857 | 4.7 | +4.7 |
| Total formal votes | | 61,354 | 92.3 | |
| Informal votes | | 5,151 | 7.7 | |
| Turnout | | 66,505 | 93.7 | |
Two-party-preferred result
| Labor | Ric Charlesworth | 34,819 | 56.8 | +0.5 |
| Liberal | Bob Campbell | 26,535 | 43.2 | −0.5 |
| Labor hold | | Swing | +0.5 | |

==== 1984 ====
1984 Australian federal election: Perth
| Party | Candidate | Votes | % | ±% |
|---|---|---|---|---|
| Labor | Ric Charlesworth | 32,906 | 55.2 | −1.3 |
| Liberal | Joan Walters | 25,148 | 42.2 | +1.5 |
| Socialist Workers | Catherine Brown | 1,535 | 2.6 | +2.6 |
| Total formal votes | | 59,589 | 91.3 | |
| Informal votes | | 5,670 | 8.7 | |
| Turnout | | 65,259 | 93.6 | |
Two-party-preferred result
| Labor | Ric Charlesworth | 33,523 | 56.3 | −1.9 |
| Liberal | Joan Walters | 26,066 | 43.7 | +1.9 |
| Labor hold | | Swing | −1.9 | |

==== 1983 ====
1983 Australian federal election: Perth
| Party | Candidate | Votes | % | ±% |
|---|---|---|---|---|
| Labor | Ric Charlesworth | 34,108 | 54.7 | +9.0 |
| Liberal | Ross McLean | 26,510 | 42.5 | −5.7 |
| Democrats | Geoffrey Syme | 1,770 | 2.8 | −2.4 |
| Total formal votes | | 62,388 | 97.7 | |
| Informal votes | | 1,446 | 2.3 | |
| Turnout | | 63,834 | 92.5 | |
Two-party-preferred result
| Labor | Ric Charlesworth | | 56.4 | +7.4 |
| Liberal | Ross McLean | | 43.6 | −7.4 |
| Labor gain from Liberal | | Swing | +7.4 | |

==== 1980 ====
1980 Australian federal election: Perth
| Party | Candidate | Votes | % | ±% |
|---|---|---|---|---|
| Liberal | Ross McLean | 29,131 | 48.2 | −2.6 |
| Labor | William Delaney | 27,599 | 45.7 | +10.4 |
| Democrats | Robert Foster | 3,112 | 5.2 | −4.6 |
| Progressive Conservative | June Steen-Olsen | 551 | 0.9 | +0.9 |
| Total formal votes | | 60,403 | 97.0 | |
| Informal votes | | 1,843 | 3.0 | |
| Turnout | | 62,246 | 93.0 | |
Two-party-preferred result
| Liberal | Ross McLean | 30,807 | 51.0 | −8.5 |
| Labor | William Delaney | 29,596 | 49.0 | +8.5 |
| Liberal hold | | Swing | −8.5 | |

=== Elections in the 1970s ===
==== 1977 ====
1977 Australian federal election: Perth
| Party | Candidate | Votes | % | ±% |
|---|---|---|---|---|
| Liberal | Ross McLean | 31,944 | 50.8 | −5.6 |
| Labor | James Moiler | 22,177 | 35.3 | −6.9 |
| Democrats | Thomas Garrick | 6,153 | 9.8 | +9.8 |
| Progress | Lawrence Curtis | 2,591 | 4.1 | +4.1 |
| Total formal votes | | 62,865 | 96.5 | |
| Informal votes | | 2,266 | 3.5 | |
| Turnout | | 65,131 | 95.1 | |
Two-party-preferred result
| Liberal | Ross McLean | | 59.5 | −3.0 |
| Labor | James Moiler | | 40.5 | +3.0 |
| Liberal hold | | Swing | −3.0 | |

==== 1975 ====
1975 Australian federal election: Perth
| Party | Candidate | Votes | % | ±% |
|---|---|---|---|---|
| Liberal | Ross McLean | 31,658 | 50.7 | +13.0 |
| Labor | Joe Berinson | 29,902 | 47.9 | −8.6 |
| Communist | Vic Slater | 890 | 1.4 | +0.5 |
| Total formal votes | | 62,450 | 97.1 | |
| Informal votes | | 1,845 | 2.9 | |
| Turnout | | 64,295 | 94.3 | |
Two-party-preferred result
| Liberal | Ross McLean | | 50.8 | +9.0 |
| Labor | Joe Berinson | | 49.2 | −9.0 |
| Liberal gain from Labor | | Swing | +9.0 | |

==== 1974 ====
1974 Australian federal election: Perth
| Party | Candidate | Votes | % | ±% |
|---|---|---|---|---|
| Labor | Joe Berinson | 33,786 | 56.5 | +4.0 |
| Liberal | Derrick Tomlinson | 22,529 | 37.7 | −4.5 |
| National Alliance | Dorothy Cranley | 2,487 | 4.2 | −1.1 |
| Communist | Paul Marsh | 539 | 0.9 | +0.9 |
| Australia | Wilfred Campin | 411 | 0.7 | +0.7 |
| Total formal votes | | 59,752 | 96.6 | |
| Informal votes | | 2,077 | 3.4 | |
| Turnout | | 61,829 | 93.9 | |
Two-party-preferred result
| Labor | Joe Berinson | | 58.2 | +4.6 |
| Liberal | Derrick Tomlinson | | 41.8 | −4.6 |
| Labor hold | | Swing | +4.6 | |

==== 1972 ====
1972 Australian federal election: Perth
| Party | Candidate | Votes | % | ±% |
|---|---|---|---|---|
| Labor | Joe Berinson | 28,226 | 51.3 | −3.8 |
| Liberal | Derrick Tomlinson | 23,911 | 43.4 | +5.1 |
| Democratic Labor | Dorothy Cranley | 2,928 | 5.3 | +1.2 |
| Total formal votes | | 55,065 | 97.1 | |
| Informal votes | | 1,623 | 2.9 | |
| Turnout | | 56,688 | 92.3 | |
Two-party-preferred result
| Labor | Joe Berinson | | 52.4 | −5.8 |
| Liberal | Derrick Tomlinson | | 47.6 | +5.8 |
| Labor hold | | Swing | −5.8 | |

=== Elections in the 1960s ===
==== 1969 ====
1969 Australian federal election: Perth
| Party | Candidate | Votes | % | ±% |
|---|---|---|---|---|
| Labor | Joe Berinson | 29,309 | 55.1 | +15.6 |
| Liberal | Fred Chaney Sr. | 20,373 | 38.3 | −8.3 |
| Democratic Labor | John Martyr | 2,159 | 4.1 | −3.7 |
| Independent | Patricia Giles | 1,308 | 2.5 | +2.5 |
| Total formal votes | | 53,149 | 96.6 | |
| Informal votes | | 1,866 | 3.4 | |
| Turnout | | 55,015 | 93.7 | |
Two-party-preferred result
| Labor | Joe Berinson | | 58.2 | +12.2 |
| Liberal | Fred Chaney Sr. | | 41.8 | −12.2 |
| Labor gain from Liberal | | Swing | +12.2 | |

==== 1966 ====
1966 Australian federal election: Perth
| Party | Candidate | Votes | % | ±% |
|---|---|---|---|---|
| Liberal | Fred Chaney Sr. | 13,223 | 49.5 | −4.8 |
| Labor | Alan Bate | 9,785 | 36.6 | −3.6 |
| Democratic Labor | George Mazak | 2,071 | 7.8 | +2.2 |
| Communist | Annette Aarons | 1,627 | 6.1 | +6.1 |
| Total formal votes | | 26,706 | 92.9 | |
| Informal votes | | 2,046 | 7.1 | |
| Turnout | | 28,752 | 93.4 | |
Two-party-preferred result
| Liberal | Fred Chaney Sr. | | 56.9 | −1.9 |
| Labor | Alan Bate | | 43.1 | +1.9 |
| Liberal hold | | Swing | −1.9 | |

==== 1963 ====
1963 Australian federal election: Perth
| Party | Candidate | Votes | % | ±% |
|---|---|---|---|---|
| Liberal | Fred Chaney Sr. | 15,867 | 54.3 | −0.7 |
| Labor | Edward Halse | 11,743 | 40.2 | +4.4 |
| Democratic Labor | Arthur White | 1,629 | 5.6 | −3.6 |
| Total formal votes | | 29,239 | 97.1 | |
| Informal votes | | 860 | 2.9 | |
| Turnout | | 30,099 | 93.8 | |
Two-party-preferred result
| Liberal | Fred Chaney Sr. | | 58.8 | −3.6 |
| Labor | Edward Halse | | 41.2 | +3.6 |
| Liberal hold | | Swing | −3.6 | |

==== 1961 ====
1961 Australian federal election: Perth
| Party | Candidate | Votes | % | ±% |
|---|---|---|---|---|
| Liberal | Fred Chaney Sr. | 16,054 | 55.0 | −1.0 |
| Labor | Laurie Wilkinson | 10,443 | 35.8 | +4.2 |
| Democratic Labor | Julius Re | 2,679 | 9.2 | −1.1 |
| Total formal votes | | 29,176 | 95.3 | |
| Informal votes | | 1,436 | 4.7 | |
| Turnout | | 30,612 | 92.7 | |
Two-party-preferred result
| Liberal | Fred Chaney Sr. | | 62.4 | −2.8 |
| Labor | Laurie Wilkinson | | 37.6 | +2.8 |
| Liberal hold | | Swing | −2.8 | |

=== Elections in the 1950s ===
==== 1958 ====
1958 Australian federal election: Perth
| Party | Candidate | Votes | % | ±% |
|---|---|---|---|---|
| Liberal | Fred Chaney Sr. | 17,426 | 56.0 | +4.5 |
| Labor | Laurie Wilkinson | 9,841 | 31.6 | −16.9 |
| Democratic Labor | Terence Merchant | 3,189 | 10.3 | +10.3 |
| Independent | Claude Swaine | 655 | 2.1 | +2.1 |
| Total formal votes | | 31,111 | 95.7 | |
| Informal votes | | 1,393 | 4.3 | |
| Turnout | | 32,504 | 94.2 | |
Two-party-preferred result
| Liberal | Fred Chaney Sr. | | 65.2 | +13.7 |
| Labor | Laurie Wilkinson | | 34.8 | −13.7 |
| Liberal hold | | Swing | +13.7 | |

==== 1955 ====
1955 Australian federal election: Perth
| Party | Candidate | Votes | % | ±% |
|---|---|---|---|---|
| Liberal | Fred Chaney Sr. | 17,575 | 51.5 | +4.6 |
| Labor | Tom Burke | 16,536 | 48.5 | −2.4 |
| Total formal votes | | 34,111 | 96.8 | |
| Informal votes | | 1,142 | 3.2 | |
| Turnout | | 35,253 | 94.4 | |
| Liberal gain from Labor | | Swing | +3.8 | |

==== 1954 ====
1954 Australian federal election: Perth
| Party | Candidate | Votes | % | ±% |
|---|---|---|---|---|
| Labor | Tom Burke | 15,912 | 51.7 | +2.7 |
| Liberal | Robert Phillips | 14,087 | 45.7 | −3.8 |
| All Parties | Carlyle Ferguson | 530 | 1.7 | +1.7 |
| Communist | John Gandini | 275 | 0.9 | −0.6 |
| Total formal votes | | 30,804 | 97.8 | |
| Informal votes | | 679 | 2.2 | |
| Turnout | | 31,483 | 96.6 | |
Two-party-preferred result
| Labor | Tom Burke | | 52.3 | +2.1 |
| Liberal | Robert Phillips | | 47.7 | −2.1 |
| Labor hold | | Swing | +2.1 | |

==== 1951 ====
1951 Australian federal election: Perth
| Party | Candidate | Votes | % | ±% |
|---|---|---|---|---|
| Liberal | Billy Snedden | 17,705 | 49.5 | +3.1 |
| Labor | Tom Burke | 17,501 | 49.0 | +1.2 |
| Communist | James Kelly | 532 | 1.5 | +0.2 |
| Total formal votes | | 35,738 | 97.4 | |
| Informal votes | | 965 | 2.6 | |
| Turnout | | 36,703 | 94.6 | |
Two-party-preferred result
| Labor | Tom Burke | 17,926 | 50.2 | +0.1 |
| Liberal | Billy Snedden | 17,812 | 49.8 | −0.1 |
| Labor hold | | Swing | +0.1 | |

=== Elections in the 1940s ===
==== 1949 ====
1949 Australian federal election: Perth
| Party | Candidate | Votes | % | ±% |
|---|---|---|---|---|
| Labor | Tom Burke | 18,412 | 47.8 | −7.7 |
| Liberal | Gordon Hack | 17,858 | 46.4 | +10.9 |
| Independent | James Collins | 1,756 | 4.6 | +4.6 |
| Communist | James Kelly | 486 | 1.3 | −2.3 |
| Total formal votes | | 38,512 | 97.5 | |
| Informal votes | | 992 | 2.5 | |
| Turnout | | 39,504 | 94.9 | |
Two-party-preferred result
| Labor | Tom Burke | 19,294 | 50.1 | −11.3 |
| Liberal | Gordon Hack | 19,218 | 49.9 | +11.3 |
| Labor hold | | Swing | −11.3 | |

==== 1946 ====
1946 Australian federal election: Perth
| Party | Candidate | Votes | % | ±% |
|---|---|---|---|---|
| Labor | Tom Burke | 31,231 | 49.0 | +6.7 |
| Liberal | Jim Paton | 27,429 | 43.1 | +13.7 |
| Services | John Graham | 2,167 | 3.4 | +3.4 |
| Communist | Kevin Healy | 2,004 | 3.1 | −3.0 |
| Independent | Robert Salter | 889 | 1.4 | +1.4 |
| Total formal votes | | 63,710 | 95.8 | |
| Informal votes | | 2,820 | 4.2 | |
| Turnout | | 66,530 | 92.6 | |
Two-party-preferred result
| Labor | Tom Burke | | 52.4 | −3.6 |
| Liberal | Jim Paton | | 47.6 | +3.6 |
| Labor hold | | Swing | −3.6 | |

==== 1943 ====
1943 Australian federal election: Perth
| Party | Candidate | Votes | % | ±% |
|---|---|---|---|---|
| Labor | Tom Burke | 25,376 | 42.3 | +10.8 |
| United Australia | Walter Nairn | 17,610 | 29.4 | −33.0 |
| Independent | Thomas Hughes | 8,112 | 13.5 | +13.5 |
| Communist | Clarrie Boyd | 3,639 | 6.1 | +6.1 |
| Independent | Stephenson Fox | 2,611 | 4.4 | +4.4 |
| Independent | Robert Nicholson | 1,501 | 2.5 | +2.5 |
| Independent | Dorothea Foster | 495 | 0.8 | +0.8 |
| Independent | William Herbert | 419 | 0.7 | +0.7 |
| Independent | Thomas Groves | 169 | 0.3 | +0.3 |
| Total formal votes | | 59,932 | 93.3 | |
| Informal votes | | 4,311 | 6.7 | |
| Turnout | | 64,243 | 99.0 | |
Two-party-preferred result
| Labor | Tom Burke | 33,581 | 56.0 | +20.5 |
| United Australia | Walter Nairn | 26,351 | 44.0 | −20.5 |
| Labor gain from United Australia | | Swing | +20.5 | |

==== 1940 ====
1940 Australian federal election: Perth
| Party | Candidate | Votes | % | ±% |
|---|---|---|---|---|
| United Australia | Walter Nairn | 33,999 | 62.4 | +2.4 |
| Labor | Gavan McMillan | 17,144 | 31.5 | −2.6 |
| Independent | James Bolitho | 3,326 | 6.1 | +6.1 |
| Total formal votes | | 54,469 | 96.9 | |
| Informal votes | | 1,738 | 3.1 | |
| Turnout | | 56,207 | 93.5 | |
Two-party-preferred result
| United Australia | Walter Nairn | | 64.5 | +4.2 |
| Labor | Gavan McMillan | | 35.5 | −4.2 |
| United Australia hold | | Swing | +4.2 | |

=== Elections in the 1930s ===
==== 1937 ====
1937 Australian federal election: Perth
| Party | Candidate | Votes | % | ±% |
|---|---|---|---|---|
| United Australia | Walter Nairn | 21,800 | 41.1 | +22.6 |
| Labor | Tom Burke | 18,091 | 34.1 | +0.1 |
| United Australia | Jack Simons | 10,035 | 18.9 | +18.9 |
| Independent | Viv James | 3,085 | 5.8 | +5.8 |
| Total formal votes | | 53,011 | 96.4 | |
| Informal votes | | 1,980 | 3.6 | |
| Turnout | | 54,991 | 93.6 | |
Two-party-preferred result
| United Australia | Walter Nairn | 31,942 | 60.3 | +2.9 |
| Labor | Tom Burke | 21,069 | 39.7 | −2.9 |
| United Australia hold | | Swing | +2.9 | |

==== 1934 ====
1934 Australian federal election: Perth
| Party | Candidate | Votes | % | ±% |
|---|---|---|---|---|
| United Australia | Walter Nairn | 16,727 | 41.6 | −18.9 |
| Labor | Herb Graham | 13,737 | 34.2 | −5.3 |
| Nationalist | Tom Hartrey | 6,713 | 16.7 | +16.7 |
| Independent Liberal | Carlyle Ferguson | 3,015 | 7.5 | +7.5 |
| Total formal votes | | 40,192 | 96.0 | |
| Informal votes | | 1,667 | 4.0 | |
| Turnout | | 41,859 | 92.2 | |
Two-party-preferred result
| United Australia | Walter Nairn | 22,821 | 56.8 | −3.7 |
| Labor | Herb Graham | 17,371 | 43.2 | +3.7 |
| United Australia hold | | Swing | −3.7 | |

==== 1931 ====
1931 Australian federal election: Perth
| Party | Candidate | Votes | % | ±% |
|---|---|---|---|---|
| United Australia | Walter Nairn | 22,102 | 60.5 | +25.0 |
| Labor | John Moloney | 14,459 | 39.5 | −3.6 |
| Total formal votes | | 36,561 | 95.4 | |
| Informal votes | | 1,762 | 4.6 | |
| Turnout | | 38,323 | 91.3 | |
| United Australia hold | | Swing | +10.0 | |

=== Elections in the 1920s ===
==== 1929 ====
1929 Australian federal election: Perth
| Party | Candidate | Votes | % | ±% |
|---|---|---|---|---|
| Labor | Ted Needham | 16,411 | 43.1 | +9.1 |
| Nationalist | Walter Nairn | 13,521 | 35.5 | −26.3 |
| Ind. Nationalist | Edward Mann | 7,645 | 20.1 | +20.1 |
| Independent | John McCoo | 522 | 1.4 | −2.8 |
| Total formal votes | | 38,099 | 97.4 | |
| Informal votes | | 1,020 | 2.6 | |
| Turnout | | 39,119 | 89.9 | |
Two-party-preferred result
| Nationalist | Walter Nairn | 19,254 | 50.5 | −14.4 |
| Labor | Ted Needham | 18,845 | 49.5 | +14.4 |
| Nationalist hold | | Swing | −14.4 | |

==== 1928 ====
1928 Australian federal election: Perth
| Party | Candidate | Votes | % | ±% |
|---|---|---|---|---|
| Nationalist | Edward Mann | 22,002 | 61.8 | −1.0 |
| Labor | Arthur Watts | 12,082 | 34.0 | −3.2 |
| Independent | John McCoo | 1,499 | 4.2 | +4.2 |
| Total formal votes | | 35,583 | 95.2 | |
| Informal votes | | 1,803 | 4.8 | |
| Turnout | | 37,386 | 91.8 | |
Two-party-preferred result
| Nationalist | Edward Mann | | 64.9 | +2.1 |
| Labor | Arthur Watts | | 35.1 | −2.1 |
| Nationalist hold | | Swing | +2.1 | |

==== 1925 ====
1925 Australian federal election: Perth
| Party | Candidate | Votes | % | ±% |
|---|---|---|---|---|
| Nationalist | Edward Mann | 21,517 | 62.8 | −3.0 |
| Labor | Dick Lane | 12,768 | 37.2 | +3.0 |
| Total formal votes | | 34,285 | 96.7 | |
| Informal votes | | 1,161 | 3.3 | |
| Turnout | | 35,446 | 91.3 | |
| Nationalist hold | | Swing | +3.9 | |

==== 1922 ====
1922 Australian federal election: Perth
| Party | Candidate | Votes | % | ±% |
|---|---|---|---|---|
| Labor | Andrew Clementson | 4,951 | 34.2 | −0.3 |
| Nationalist | Edward Mann | 3,073 | 21.3 | +1.0 |
| Nationalist | James Fowler | 2,583 | 17.9 | +1.0 |
| Nationalist | Alfred Carson | 2,125 | 14.7 | +1.0 |
| Nationalist | Harry Bolton | 1,728 | 12.0 | +12.0 |
| Total formal votes | | 14,460 | 92.1 | |
| Informal votes | | 1,246 | 7.9 | |
| Turnout | | 15,706 | 46.8 | |
Two-party-preferred result
| Nationalist | Edward Mann | 8,513 | 58.9 | −2.9 |
| Labor | Andrew Clementson | 5,947 | 41.1 | +2.9 |
| Nationalist hold | | Swing | −2.9 | |

=== Elections in the 1910s ===
==== 1919 ====
1919 Australian federal election: Perth
| Party | Candidate | Votes | % | ±% |
|---|---|---|---|---|
| Nationalist | James Fowler | 7,721 | 38.4 | −7.7 |
| Labor | John Curtin | 6,877 | 34.2 | +3.7 |
| Nationalist | Lionel Carter | 4,699 | 23.4 | +23.4 |
| Ind. Free Trade | Gerald Hartrey | 811 | 4.0 | +4.0 |
| Total formal votes | | 20,108 | 93.4 | |
| Informal votes | | 1,419 | 6.6 | |
| Turnout | | 21,527 | 58.4 | |
Two-party-preferred result
| Nationalist | James Fowler | 12,275 | 61.0 | −8.5 |
| Labor | John Curtin | 7,833 | 39.0 | +8.5 |
| Nationalist hold | | Swing | −8.5 | |

==== 1917 ====
1917 Australian federal election: Perth
| Party | Candidate | Votes | % | ±% |
|---|---|---|---|---|
| Nationalist | James Fowler | 18,715 | 69.5 | +13.7 |
| Labor | Alexander Panton | 8,221 | 30.5 | −13.7 |
| Total formal votes | | 26,936 | 95.8 | |
| Informal votes | | 1,191 | 4.2 | |
| Turnout | | 28,127 | 76.5 | |
| Nationalist hold | | Swing | +13.7 | |

==== 1914 ====
1914 Australian federal election: Perth
| Party | Candidate | Votes | % | ±% |
|---|---|---|---|---|
| Liberal | James Fowler | 15,256 | 55.8 | +2.5 |
| Labor | Alick McCallum | 12,071 | 44.2 | −2.5 |
| Total formal votes | | 27,327 | 97.0 | |
| Informal votes | | 836 | 3.0 | |
| Turnout | | 28,163 | 67.7 | |
| Liberal hold | | Swing | +2.5 | |

==== 1913 ====
1913 Australian federal election: Perth
| Party | Candidate | Votes | % | ±% |
|---|---|---|---|---|
| Liberal | James Fowler | 14,846 | 53.3 | −7.9 |
| Labor | Alick McCallum | 13,001 | 46.7 | +7.9 |
| Total formal votes | | 27,847 | 97.1 | |
| Informal votes | | 1,116 | 3.9 | |
| Turnout | | 28,963 | 71.6 | |
| Liberal hold | | Swing | −7.9 | |

==== 1910 ====
1910 Australian federal election: Perth
| Party | Candidate | Votes | % | ±% |
|---|---|---|---|---|
| Liberal | James Fowler | 9,648 | 60.7 | +13.4 |
| Labour | Ernest Henshaw | 6,237 | 39.3 | −13.4 |
| Total formal votes | | 15,885 | 97.7 | |
| Informal votes | | 371 | 2.3 | |
| Turnout | | 16,256 | 59.8 | |
| Liberal gain from Labour | | Swing | +13.4 | |

=== Elections in the 1900s ===
==== 1906 ====
1906 Australian federal election: Perth
| Party | Candidate | Votes | % | ±% |
|---|---|---|---|---|
| Labour | James Fowler | 4,892 | 52.7 | −20.1 |
| Western Australian | Edward Thurstan | 4,384 | 47.3 | +20.1 |
| Total formal votes | | 9,276 | 96.7 | |
| Informal votes | | 343 | 3.6 | |
| Turnout | | 9,619 | 30.0 | |
| Labour hold | | Swing | −20.1 | |

==== 1903 ====
1903 Australian federal election: Perth
| Party | Candidate | Votes | % | ±% |
|---|---|---|---|---|
| Labour | James Fowler | 4,248 | 72.8 | +13.7 |
| Free Trade | Harry Venn | 1,591 | 27.2 | +27.2 |
| Total formal votes | | 5,839 | 94.3 | |
| Informal votes | | 354 | 5.7 | |
| Turnout | | 6,193 | 22.8 | |
| Labour hold | | Swing | +13.7 | |

==== 1901 ====
1901 Australian federal election: Perth
| Party | Candidate | Votes | % | ±% |
|---|---|---|---|---|
| Labour | James Fowler | 3,334 | 59.1 | +59.1 |
| Protectionist | Michael Cavanagh | 2,310 | 40.9 | +40.9 |
| Total formal votes | | 5,644 | 98.2 | |
| Informal votes | | 106 | 1.8 | |
| Turnout | | 5,750 | 31.1 | |
| Labour win | | (new seat) | | |
