= Electoral results for the Division of Darwin =

Australian division election results

This is a list of electoral results for the Division of Darwin in Australian federal elections from the division's creation in 1903 until its abolition in 1955.

== Members ==
Member	Party	Term
King O'Malley	Labor	1903–1917
Charles Howroyd	Nationalist	1917–1917
William Spence	Nationalist	1917 by–1919
George Bell	Nationalist	1919–1922
Joshua Whitsitt	Country	1922–1925
(Sir) George Bell	Nationalist	1925–1931
(Sir) George Bell	United Australia	1931–1943
Dame Enid Lyons	United Australia	1943–1945
Dame Enid Lyons	Liberal	1945–1951
Aubrey Luck	Liberal	1951–1955

== Election results ==
=== Elections in the 1950s ===
==== 1954 ====
1954 Australian federal election: Darwin
Party	Candidate	Votes	%	±%
Liberal	Aubrey Luck	16,447	50.5	+0.8
Labor	Clem Foster	16,117	49.5	−0.8
Total formal votes		32,564	99.1	
Informal votes		283	0.9	
Turnout		32,847	96.5	
Liberal hold		Swing	−3.5	

==== 1951 ====
1951 Australian federal election: Darwin
Party	Candidate	Votes	%	±%
Liberal	Aubrey Luck	14,819	49.7	−6.9
Labor	Max Poulter	9,820	32.9	+6.9
Labor	Clem Foster	5,171	17.3	+17.3
Total formal votes		29,810	97.3	
Informal votes		822	2.7	
Turnout		30,632	97.3	
Two-party-preferred result
Liberal	Aubrey Luck	16,103	54.0	−2.6
Labor	Max Poulter	13,707	46.0	+2.6
Liberal hold		Swing	−2.6	

=== Elections in the 1940s ===
==== 1949 ====
1949 Australian federal election: Darwin
Party	Candidate	Votes	%	±%
Liberal	Dame Enid Lyons	16,455	56.6	+3.3
Labor	Harold Kirkpatrick	12,602	43.4	−3.3
Total formal votes		29,057	97.6	
Informal votes		728	2.4	
Turnout		29,785	96.8	
Liberal hold		Swing	+3.3	

==== 1946 ====
1946 Australian federal election: Darwin
Party	Candidate	Votes	%	±%
Liberal	Dame Enid Lyons	15,835	54.2	+5.3
Labor	Harold Kirkpatrick	13,392	45.8	+3.2
Total formal votes		29,227	97.6	
Informal votes		730	2.4	
Turnout		29,957	92.4	
Liberal hold		Swing	+2.7	

==== 1943 ====
1943 Australian federal election: Darwin
Party	Candidate	Votes	%	±%
Labor	Eric Reece	7,799	28.6	+1.6
United Australia	Dame Enid Lyons	7,349	26.9	−10.3
Labor	Carrol Bramich	3,832	14.0	+14.0
United Australia	John Leary	3,104	11.4	+11.4
United Australia	John Wright	2,885	10.6	+10.6
Independent Labor	Edgar Nicholls	1,709	6.3	+6.3
Communist	Roy Harvey	616	2.3	+2.3
Total formal votes		27,294	95.3	
Informal votes		1,355	4.7	
Turnout		28,649	96.0	
Two-party-preferred result
United Australia	Dame Enid Lyons	14,055	51.5	−7.7
Labor	Eric Reece	13,239	48.5	+7.7
United Australia hold		Swing	−7.7	

==== 1940 ====
1940 Australian federal election: Darwin
Party	Candidate	Votes	%	±%
United Australia	George Bell	15,896	59.2	+6.7
Labor	Eric Reece	10,961	40.8	−6.7
Total formal votes		26,857	97.4	
Informal votes		707	2.6	
Turnout		27,564	94.0	
United Australia hold		Swing	+6.7	

=== Elections in the 1930s ===
==== 1937 ====
1937 Australian federal election: Darwin
Party	Candidate	Votes	%	±%
United Australia	George Bell	13,557	52.5	−1.9
Labor	Edwin Brown	12,270	47.5	+1.9
Total formal votes		25,827	97.9	
Informal votes		559	2.1	
Turnout		26,386	95.8	
United Australia hold		Swing	−1.9	

==== 1934 ====
1934 Australian federal election: Darwin
Party	Candidate	Votes	%	±%
United Australia	George Bell	13,271	54.4	−15.5
Labor	Edwin Brown	11,126	45.6	+15.5
Total formal votes		24,397	97.4	
Informal votes		663	2.6	
Turnout		25,060	95.2	
United Australia hold		Swing	−15.5	

==== 1931 ====
1931 Australian federal election: Darwin
Party	Candidate	Votes	%	±%
United Australia	George Bell	16,149	69.9	+16.3
Labor	Joseph McGrath	6,962	30.1	−16.3
Total formal votes		23,111	96.3	
Informal votes		887	3.7	
Turnout		23,998	96.3	
United Australia hold		Swing	+14.0	

=== Elections in the 1920s ===
==== 1929 ====
1929 Australian federal election: Darwin
Party	Candidate	Votes	%	±%
Nationalist	George Bell	11,982	53.6	−18.3
Labor	Henry Lane	5,233	23.4	+23.4
Labor	Thomas d'Alton	5,137	23.0	+23.0
Total formal votes		22,352	98.1	
Informal votes		443	1.9	
Turnout		22,795	95.1	
Two-party-preferred result
Nationalist	George Bell		55.9	−16.0
Labor	Henry Lane		44.1	+44.1
Nationalist hold		Swing	−16.0	

==== 1928 ====
1928 Australian federal election: Darwin
Party	Candidate	Votes	%	±%
Nationalist	George Bell	14,880	71.9	+9.4
Independent	James Campbell	5,813	28.1	+28.1
Total formal votes		20,693	93.7	
Informal votes		1,385	6.3	
Turnout		22,078	94.0	
Nationalist hold		Swing	+10.6	

==== 1925 ====
1925 Australian federal election: Darwin
Party	Candidate	Votes	%	±%
Nationalist	George Bell	9,682	48.1	+17.5
Labor	Henry Lane	7,541	37.5	+37.5
Nationalist	Hubert Nichols	2,886	14.4	+14.4
Total formal votes		20,109	95.5	
Informal votes		939	4.5	
Turnout		21,048	90.7	
Two-party-preferred result
Nationalist	George Bell	12,164	60.5	+10.9
Labor	Henry Lane	7,945	39.5	+39.5
Nationalist gain from Country		Swing	+10.9	

==== 1922 ====
1922 Australian federal election: Darwin
Party	Candidate	Votes	%	±%
Nationalist	George Bell	4,533	45.1	−1.3
Country	Joshua Whitsitt	4,051	40.3	+40.3
Independent	James Campbell	1,473	14.6	+14.6
Total formal votes		10,057	96.0	
Informal votes		424	4.0	
Turnout		10,481	46.5	
Two-party-preferred result
Country	Joshua Whitsitt	5,069	50.4	+50.4
Nationalist	George Bell	4,988	49.6	−2.5
Country gain from Nationalist		Swing	+2.5	

=== Elections in the 1910s ===
==== 1919 ====
1919 Australian federal election: Darwin
Party	Candidate	Votes	%	±%
Nationalist	George Bell	6,630	54.0	−4.8
Labor	Joseph Lyons	5,645	46.0	+4.8
Total formal votes		12,275	97.8	
Informal votes		274	2.2	
Turnout		12,549	67.2	
Nationalist hold		Swing	−4.8	

==== 1917 by-election ====
1917 Darwin by-election
Party	Candidate	Votes	%	±%
Nationalist	William Spence	6,665	56.06	−2.73
Labor	James Hurst	5,225	43.94	+2.73
Total formal votes		11,890	99.60	+2.13
Informal votes		48	0.40	−2.13
Registered electors		19,300		
Turnout		11,938	61.85	−21.30
Nationalist hold		Swing	−2.73	

Charles Howroyd (Nationalist) died.

==== 1917 ====
1917 Australian federal election: Darwin
Party	Candidate	Votes	%	±%
Nationalist	Charles Howroyd	9,073	58.8	+14.9
Labor	King O'Malley	6,361	41.2	−14.9
Total formal votes		15,434	97.5	
Informal votes		401	2.5	
Turnout		15,835	83.2	
Nationalist gain from Labor		Swing	+14.9	

==== 1914 ====
1914 Australian federal election: Darwin
Party	Candidate	Votes	%	±%
Labor	King O'Malley	8,585	56.1	+4.0
Liberal	Ernest Plummer	6,723	43.9	−4.0
Total formal votes		15,308	97.8	
Informal votes		340	2.2	
Turnout		15,648	78.6	
Labor hold		Swing	+4.0	

==== 1913 ====
1913 Australian federal election: Darwin
Party	Candidate	Votes	%	±%
Labor	King O'Malley	8,312	52.1	−11.2
Liberal	Alexander Marshall	7,652	47.9	+11.2
Total formal votes		15,964	97.6	
Informal votes		396	2.4	
Turnout		16,360	76.7	
Labor hold		Swing	−11.2	

==== 1910 ====
1910 Australian federal election: Darwin
Party	Candidate	Votes	%	±%
Labour	King O'Malley	6,681	63.3	+8.3
Liberal	William Fisher	3,881	36.7	+0.7
Total formal votes		10,862	97.9	
Informal votes		234	2.1	
Turnout		10,796	53.6	
Labour hold		Swing	+3.8	

=== Elections in the 1900s ===
==== 1906 ====
1906 Australian federal election: Darwin
Party	Candidate	Votes	%	±%
Labour	King O'Malley	5,215	55.0	+4.6
Anti-Socialist	William Lamerton	3,420	36.0	+36.0
Ind. Anti-Socialist	Henry Bannister	849	8.9	+8.9
Total formal votes		9,484	95.8	
Informal votes		420	4.2	
Turnout		9,904	55.3	
Labour hold		Swing	+8.8	

==== 1903 ====
1903 Australian federal election: Darwin
Party	Candidate	Votes	%	±%
Labour	King O'Malley	4,483	50.4	+50.4
Protectionist	James Brickhill	4,354	49.0	+49.0
Independent	James Gaffney	53	0.6	+0.6
Total formal votes		8,890	99.3	
Informal votes		458	4.9	
Turnout		9,348	58.0	
Labour win		(new seat)		
