= August 1954 Australian Labor Party leadership election =

Australian political party leadership election

1954 Australian Labor Party Leadership election
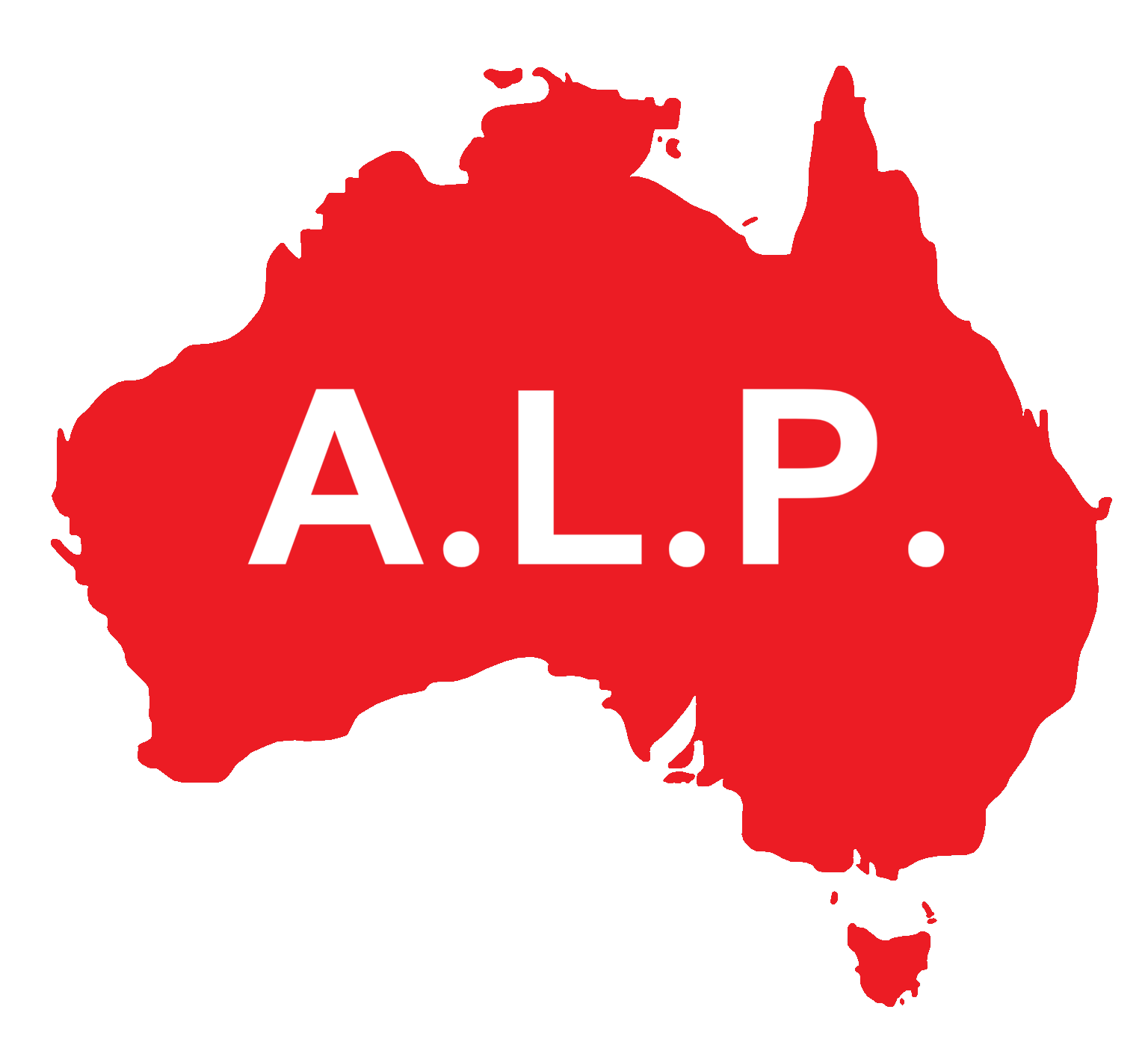
- 3 August 1954
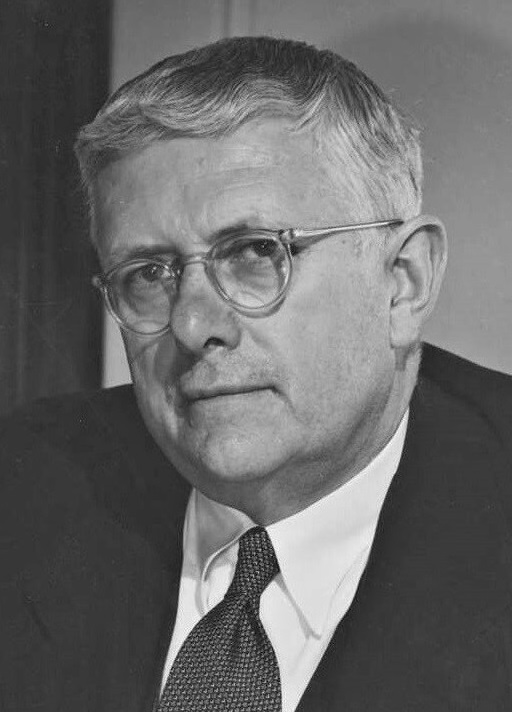

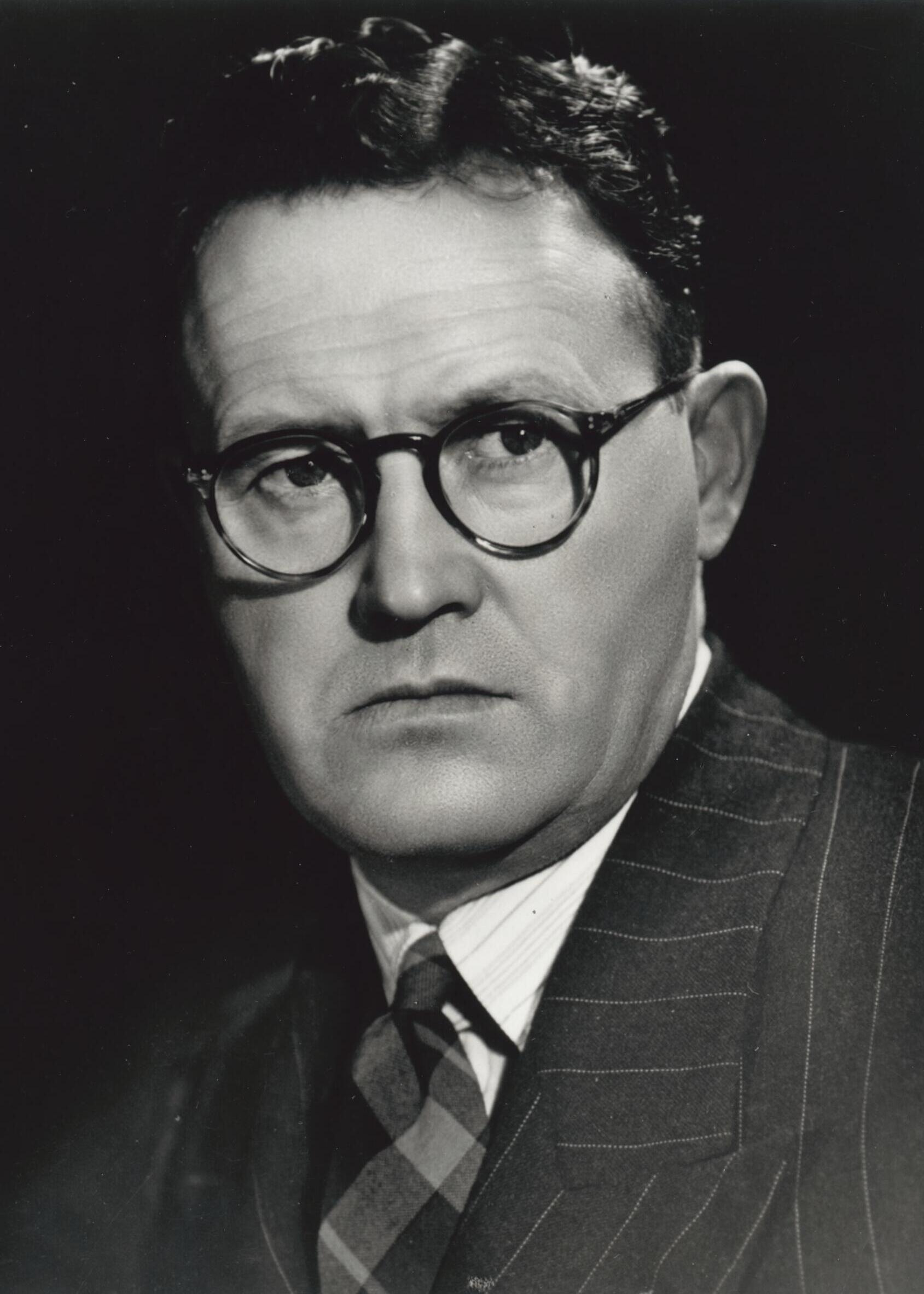
Candidate	H. V. Evatt	Tom Burke
Caucus vote	62 (77.27%)	20 (22.73%)
Leader before election
H. V. Evatt
Elected Leader
H. V. Evatt

A leadership election in the Australian Labor Party, then the opposition party in the Parliament of Australia, was held on 3 August 1954. It followed Labor's defeat at the 1954 federal election.

== Background ==
Labour was defeated at the federal election in May and at the first post-election caucus meeting leadership was declared vacant. Western Australian MP Tom Burke was nominated to challenge H. V. Evatt for the leadership. Burke did not lobby any of his colleagues in advance or organise any formal support. Despite this, he polled well, leading to speculation that had a more prominent challenger to Evatt stood they may well have won. Deputy leader Arthur Calwell was re-elected unopposed.

== Results ==
The following table gives the ballot results:

Leader

Results
Candidate	Vote(s)	V%
H. V. Evatt	68	77.27%
Tom Burke	20	22.73%
	88	100%

Other positions

Senator Bill Ashley challenged Senator Nick McKenna for the leadership in the Senate. In the voting, each polled 43 votes with 2 informal votes. Members said afterwards that one of the informal votes was blank and the other was an informal vote for Ashley. Had it been properly cast, Ashley would have won. In a second ballot, McKenna was re-elected 46 votes to 41 (with one informal). John Armstrong survived a challenge for the deputy leadership in the Senate, 47 votes to 41, by Sid O'Flaherty. Backbench MP Dan Curtin unsuccessfully challenged Fred Daly for the position of whip by 53 votes to 33.

== See also ==
- 1954 Australian federal election
- Australian Labor Party split of 1955
