= James Fowler (Australian politician) =

Australian politician

The Honourable James Fowler
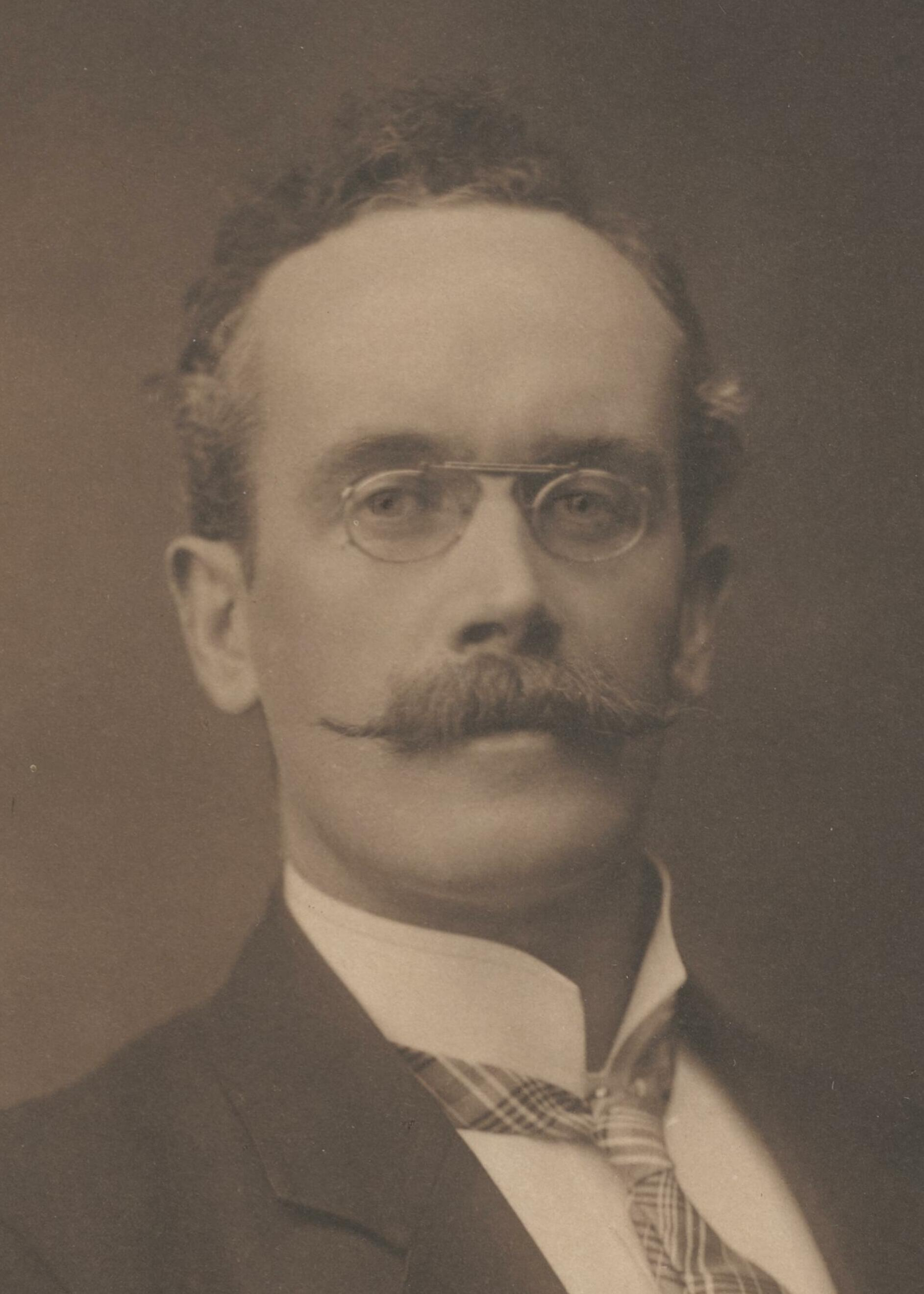

Member of the Australian Parliament for Perth
- In office 29 March 1901 – 16 December 1922
- Preceded by: New division
- Succeeded by: Edward Mann

Personal details
- Born: 20 June 1863 Strathaven, Scotland
- Died: 3 November 1940 (aged 77) Melbourne, Victoria
- Party: Labor (1901–09); Liberal (1909–17); Nationalist (1917–22)
- Spouse: Daisy Winifred Bastow

James Mackinnon Fowler (20 June 1863 – 3 November 1940) was an Australian politician who served as a member of the House of Representatives from 1901 to 1922, representing the Division of Perth. He began his career in the Australian Labor Party (ALP), but joined the Liberal Party in 1909 and then the Nationalist Party in 1917.

== Early life ==
Fowler was born on 20 June 1863 in Millholm, Lanarkshire, Scotland. He was the son of Mary (née McKinnon) and James Fowler, his father being a farmer. He was educated locally before moving to Glasgow, where from 1884 he worked in a countinghouse. He later worked in drapery firms in Glasgow and Manchester before immigrating to Australia in 1891.

Fowler initially settled in Victoria, where he was a prospector on the goldfields and was a member of the Victorian Socialist League. He moved to Perth in 1898 where he worked as a commercial accountant and freelance journalist. He was the honorary secretary of the Federal League, which supported the movement for federation of the Australian colonies.

== Politics ==
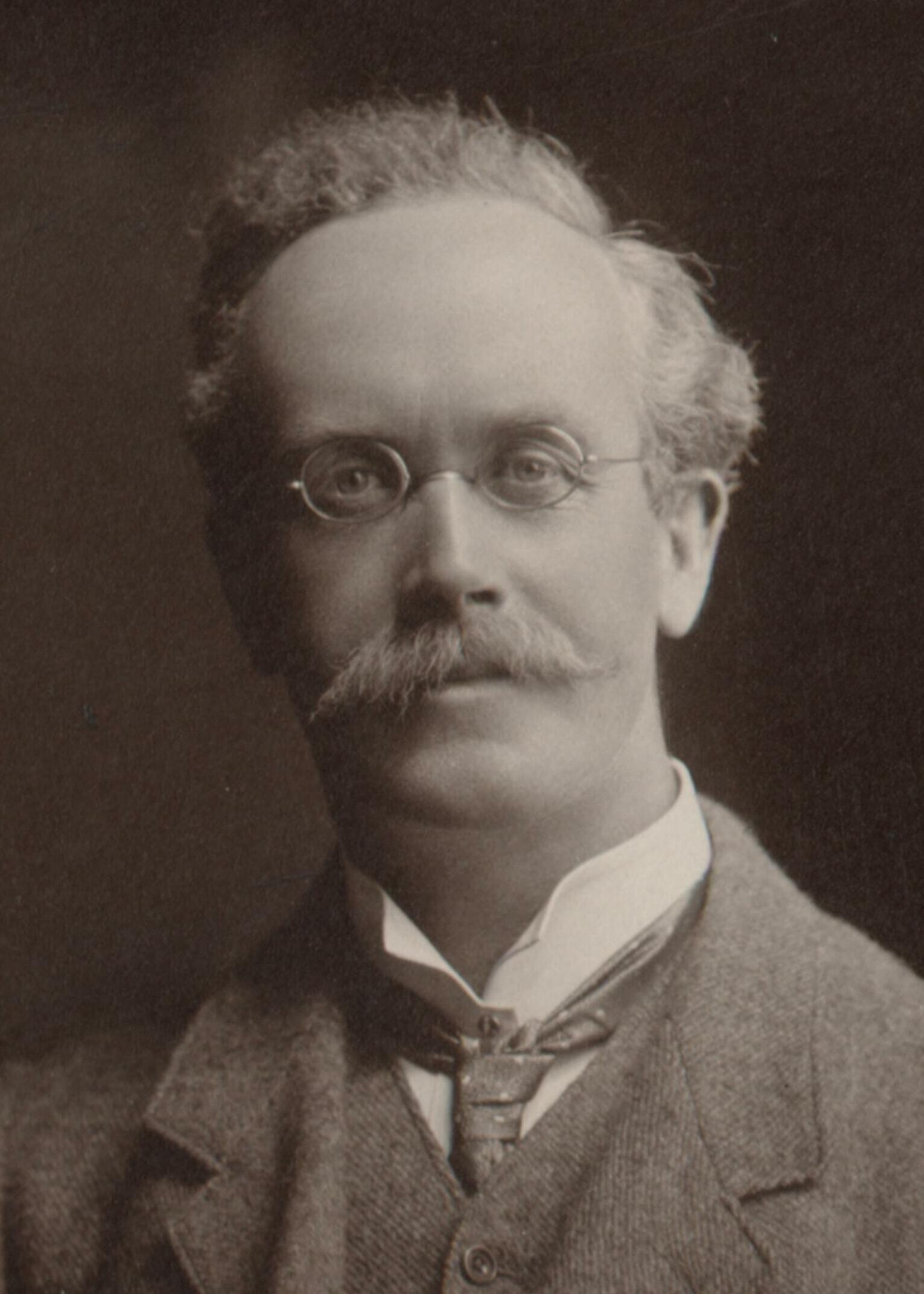
Fowler in 1908

Fowler was a leading supporter of federation and was elected at the first federal election in 1901 to the seat of Perth, representing the Australian Labor Party and was active on financial matters. He was a strong opponent of Billy Hughes within the party. In 1909, Fowler left the party claiming that it can become too centralising, although others suggested it was because of his failure to gain a portfolio. He joined the Commonwealth Liberal Party, remaining with that party until it was folded into the Nationalist Party when it was established in 1916 under Hughes' leadership. He served as chairman of committees from 1913 to 1914 during the Cook government.

In 1919 Fowler published an attack on Hughes—who was now Prime Minister —and continued to oppose him, particularly in relation to his support for high tariffs. Due in part to this, Fowler lost Nationalist endorsement at the 1922 election and lost his seat to fellow Nationalist Edward Mann. According to The Bulletin in 1921, he could have "achieved Ministerial rank long ago if he hadn't been such a good hater".

== Personal life ==
Fowler married Daisy Bastow in 1898, with whom he had a daughter and three sons. He remained in Melbourne after losing his seat in parliament, where he worked as a freelance writer. He wrote short stories and newspaper articles, sometimes using the pseudonyms Hamish Mackinnon and James Evandale. He also wrote an unpublished novel, The Day of Demos, which was inspired by being "driven slowly but surely to the conclusion that democracy as a system of government is a rank failure". He died at his home in Malvern on 3 November 1940, aged 77.

== Notes ==
Parliament of Australia
| New division | Member for Perth; 1901–1922 | Succeeded by Edward Mann |
