= Walter Nairn =

Australian politician (1879–1958)

The Honourable Walter Nairn
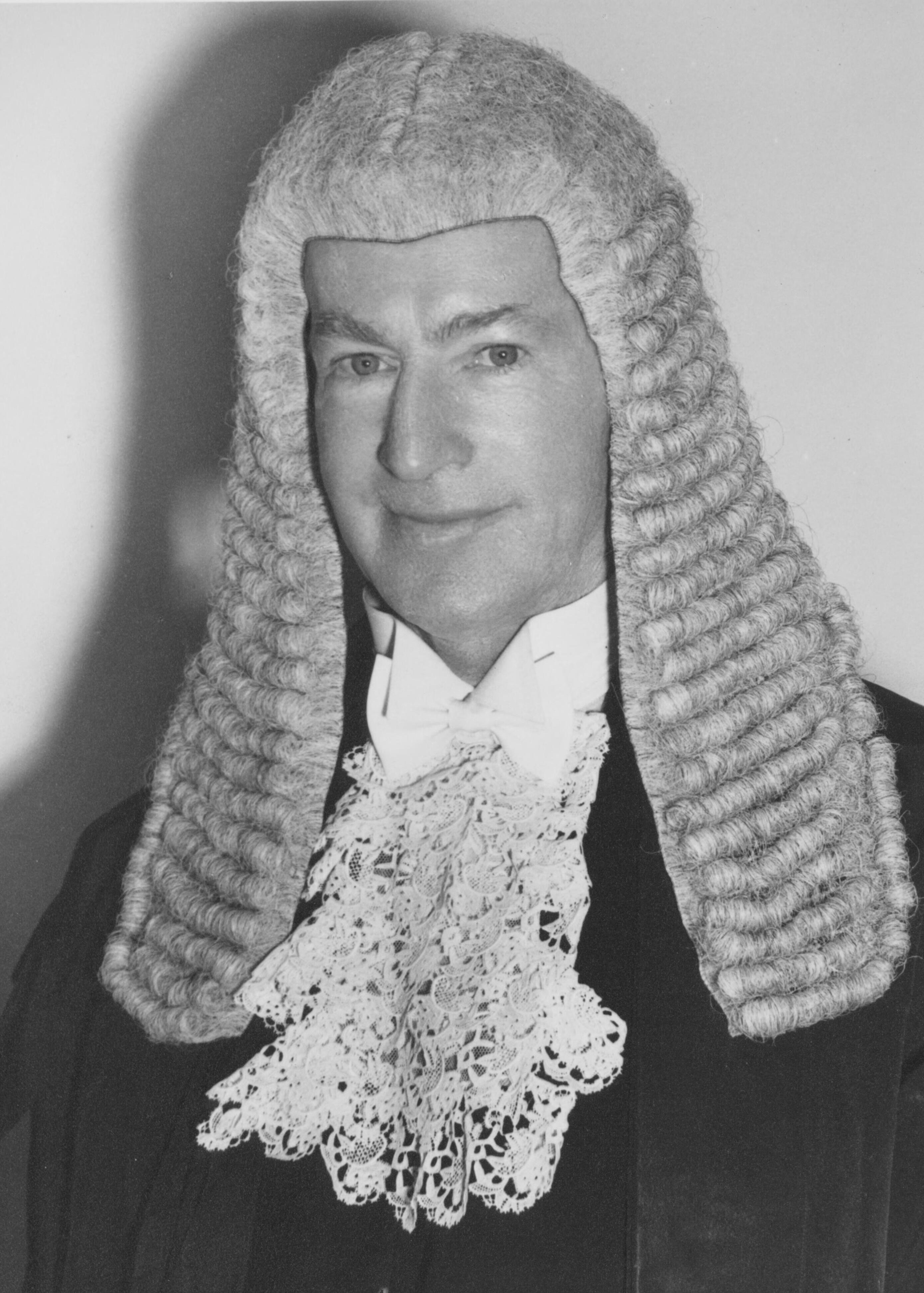

Speaker of the Australian House of Representatives
- In office 20 November 1940 – 21 June 1943
- Preceded by: George Bell
- Succeeded by: Sol Rosevear

Member of the Australian Parliament for Perth
- In office 12 October 1929 – 21 August 1943
- Preceded by: Edward Mann
- Succeeded by: Tom Burke

Personal details
- Born: 17 March 1879 Alberton, Victoria, Australia
- Died: 12 December 1958 (aged 79) Mount Lawley, Western Australia, Australia
- Party: Nationalist (to 1931); UAP (from 1931)
- Spouse(s): Philomena Boladeras (m. 1902; died 1904) Mary Bertram (m. 1905)
- Relations: William Nairn (brother)
- Occupation: Lawyer

Walter Maxwell Nairn (17 March 1879 – 12 December 1958) was an Australian politician. He was a member of the Australian House of Representatives from 1929 to 1943, representing the electorate of Perth for the Nationalist Party of Australia and its successor the United Australia Party. He was the Speaker of the House from 1940 to 1943.

== Early life ==
Nairn was born on 17 March 1879 in Alberton, Victoria. He was the third of four children born to Margaret (née Merritt) and William Nairn. His father, born in Scotland, died in 1890, placing the family into financial hardship.

Nairn attended South Melbourne College on a scholarship, matriculating in 1894. Faced with an economic depression in Victoria, he followed his brother William Ralph Nairn to Western Australia in 1896. He found employment as a proofreader with the Morning Herald, before joining The West Australian as a journalist. His experience as a court reporter led him to pursue a career in law, and he began working as a law clerk under barrister Norman Ewing.

In 1909, Nairn was admitted to the bar and joined the firm of Penny, Hill and Nairn as a partner. He was elected to the North Perth Municipal Council in the same year. In 1921 he went into partnership with Grant McDonald, the brother of Ross McDonald. Nairn's practice thrived through his political connections. In 1917 he represented Frank Wilson's government as junior counsel at the royal commission into the Nevanas affair. In 1924 he was appointed by James Mitchell as royal commissioner into the collapse of the Gosnells Estate Company. In 1927 he defended police officers connected with the Forrest River massacre.

== Politics ==
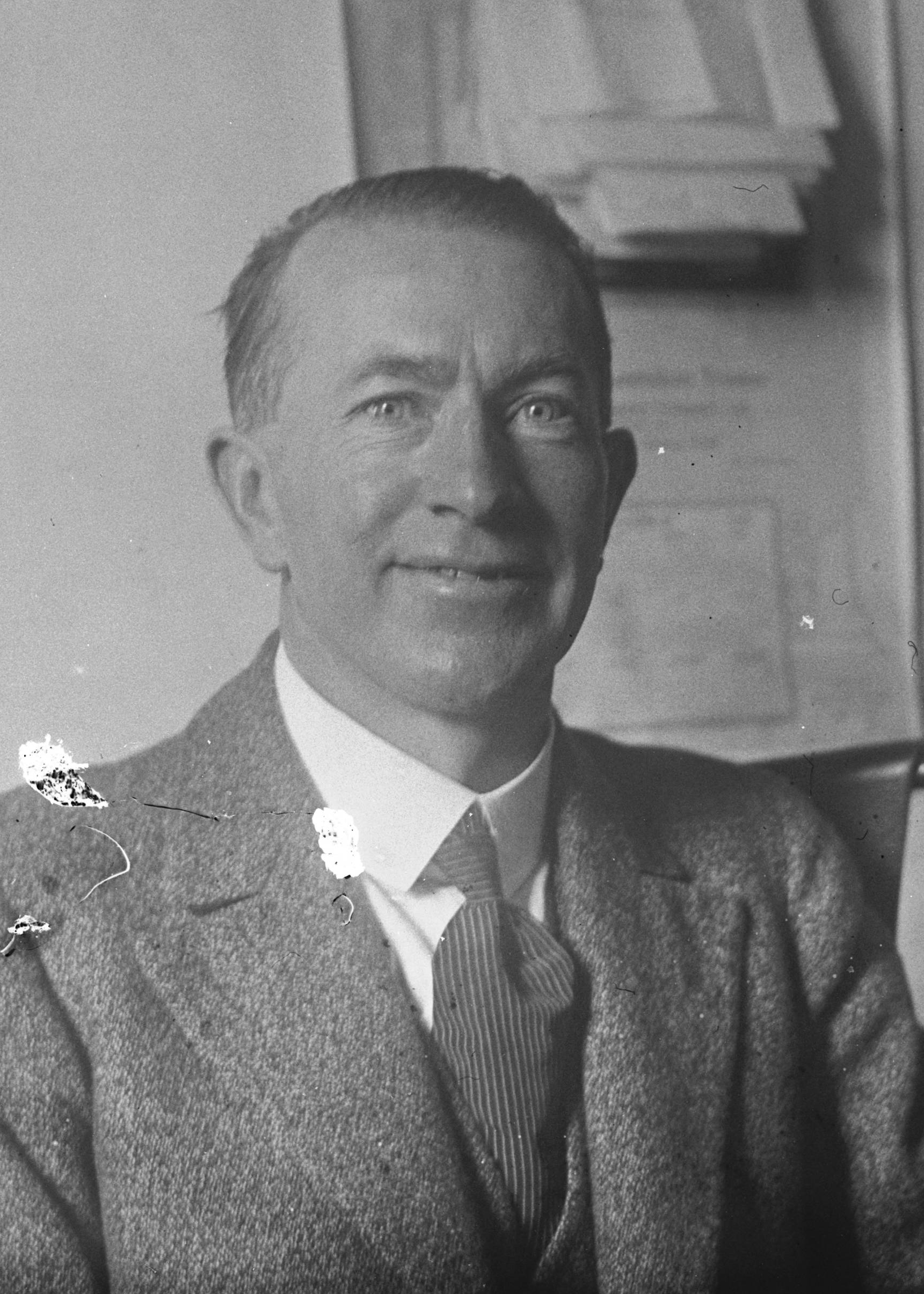
Nairn in 1927

Nairn was an unsuccessful candidate for the state seat of North Perth at the 1911 state election.

Nairn was elected to the House of Representatives at the 1929 federal election as a Nationalist in the seat of Perth, defeating incumbent and dissident former Nationalist member Edward Mann who had renominated as an independent. He was "committed to the Nationalist platform of sound finance and rationalisation of the arbitration system" and promised to resist further tariff increases. He served on the public works committee and as deputy chairman of committees, and was re-elected in 1931, 1934, 1937 and 1940.

During the Scullin government, Nairn followed the rest of the Nationalists into the new United Australia Party (UAP). He had a keen interest in parliamentary procedure and in standing orders, and in 1931 was critical of Speaker Norman Makin's decision to bar journalist Joe Alexander from the House chamber. He opposed the Western Australian secession movement in the lead-up to the 1933 referendum, but considered the Lyons government's Commonwealth Grants Commission flawed and called for the re-establishment of the Inter-State Commission.

=== Speaker of the House ===
Nairn was elected Speaker of the House after the 1940 election, unexpectedly winning a heavily contested partyroom ballot for the government nominee to succeed George John Bell, who had stepped down following the election. He remained Speaker after the Menzies minority government was defeated in parliament and replaced by the Curtin Labor government, but resigned prior to the 1943 election to allow him to vote on a no-confidence motion. He lost his seat to Labor candidate Tom Burke at the election.

== Later life ==
Nairn returned to his legal practice after his parliamentary defeat, and practised into the mid-1950s. He died in 1958, and was accorded a state funeral in Perth. His brother, William Ralph Nairn, was a member of the Western Australian Legislative Assembly.

== Personal life ==
In 1902, Nairn married Philomena Boladeras. He was widowed in 1904 and in 1905 remarried to Mary Bertram. They had three children, although their first child died in infancy.

He was also a member of Mount Lawley Golf Club and served as Vice President of the club in the late 1920s.

Parliament of Australia
Preceded by George Bell	Speaker of the Australian House of Representatives; 1940–1943	Succeeded by Sol Rosevear
Preceded by Edward Mann	Member for Perth; 1929–1943	Succeeded by Tom Burke
