= Tom Burke (Australian politician) =

Australian politician

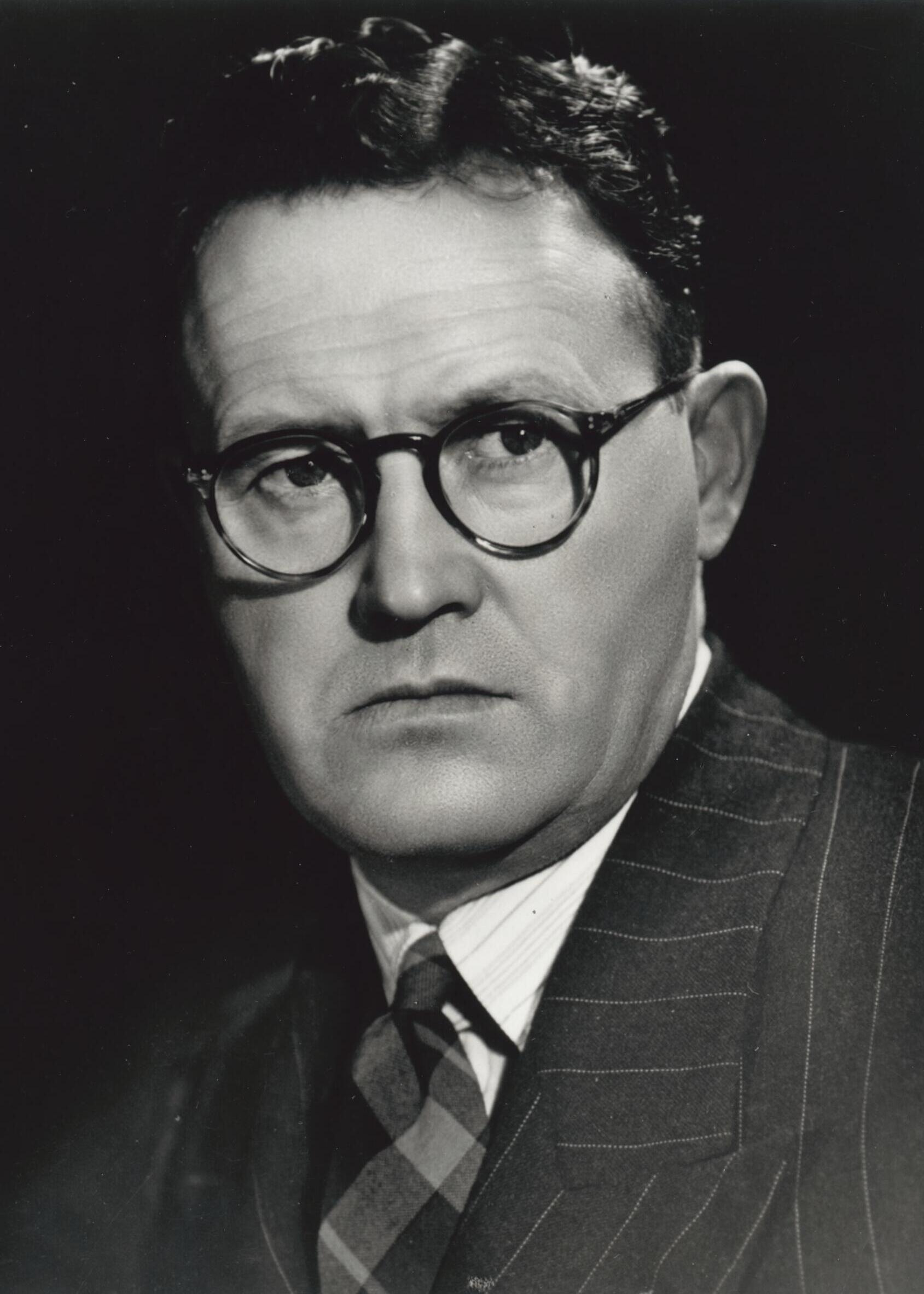
- Undated photograph

Member of the Australian House of Representatives for Perth
- In office 21 August 1943 – 10 December 1955
- Preceded by: Walter Nairn
- Succeeded by: Fred Chaney

Personal details
- Born: Patrick Thomas Burke; 28 August 1910 Moora, Western Australia
- Died: 17 January 1973 (aged 62) Perth, Western Australia
- Party: Labor
- Spouse: Madeline Muirson Orr
- Children: 5, including Terry Burke and Brian Burke

Thomas Patrick Burke (born Patrick Thomas Burke, 28 August 1910 – 17 January 1973) was an Australian politician who was a member of the Australian House of Representatives for the Division of Perth from August 1943 to December 1955. He was a member of the Labor Party until his expulsion in 1957.

Born near the town of Moora, Western Australia, Burke moved to Perth as an adult, where he worked as a cartage contractor for his father and studied accounting. He first attempted to enter politics at the 1937 federal election; after joining the Royal Australian Air Force in 1943, Burke was elected as the member for Perth in the 1943 federal election, defeating the sitting member, Walter Nairn.

Burke did not manage to gain a cabinet position before the defeat of the Labor Party in 1949. He then became one of the most anti-communist Labor MPs. In 1950, Burke convinced the state executive to support the Communist Party Dissolution Bill. He attempted to defeat Labor leader H. V. Evatt following the 1954 federal election, but fell short by 68–20. Despite expectations, following the Australian Labor Party split of 1955, Burke did not join the breakaway Australian Labor Party (Anti-Communist).

Burke lost his seat in the 1955 federal election to the Liberal party's Fred Chaney. In 1957, he was expelled from the Labor Party for his continued criticism of Evatt, however, he was readmitted in 1964. He tried twice to reenter politics, but the Labor Party would not select him. Burke died in 1973 of a myocardial infarction. Two of his sons, Terry and Brian Burke served as Labor members of the Western Australian Legislative Assembly; Brian Burke was the premier of Western Australia from 1983 to 1988.

== Early life ==
Burke was born on 28 August 1910 near the town of Moora in Western Australia. He was the third son out of eight children of Peter Francis Burke, a farmer, and Catherine Mary, née Kelly. Burke's family was of Irish descent and were Catholic. His mother named him Patrick Thomas Burke, after his paternal grandfather. At the time of his birth, his father was working in the Goldfields; when he arrived back, he insisted that Burke's name be changed to Thomas Patrick. The Burke family lived in poor conditions on a farm, named "Brooklyn", 11 kilometres (7 mi) south of Watheroo. In 1921, the farm was repossessed and the Burke's moved to a neglected farm in Miling. A school opened in the town in 1923, which the children attended. In 1929, the farm was sold and the family moved to Perth, where Peter started a cartage business for the West Perth markets. Tom Burke worked for the family business and studied accounting at night at the City Commercial College, achieving good grades.

== Political career ==
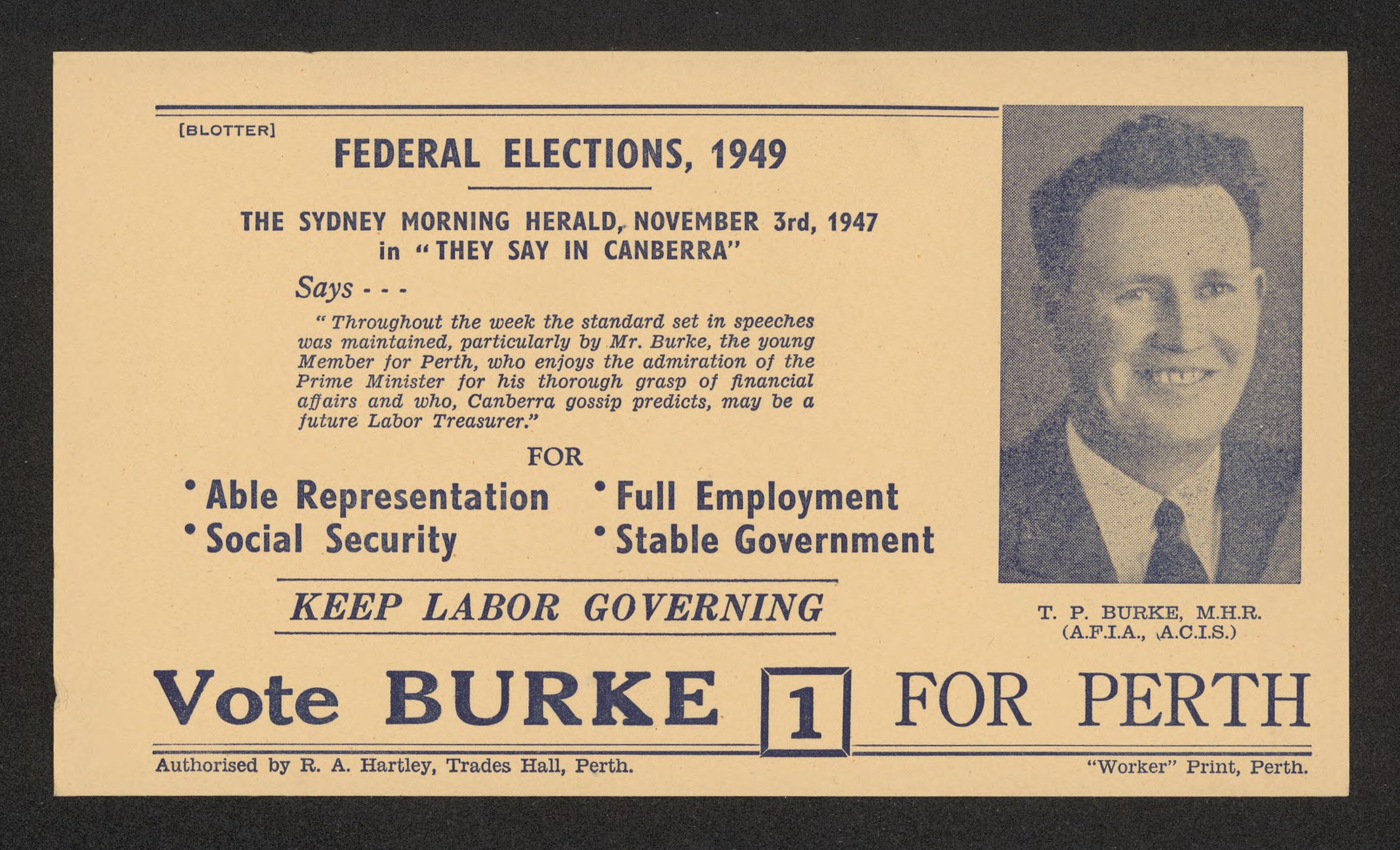
Campaign material used by Burke at the 1949 federal election

The Burke family had long supported the Labor Party, since Peter Burke's time as a miner. Tom Burke joined the Labor Party soon after arriving in Perth, and became involved in election campaigning, starting with the 1930 state election. In May 1933, he assisted in the creation of the Perth branch of the Labor Party, and in April 1935, he nominated to be a member of the party's State Executive as a delegate from the Metropolitan Council. He was a member of the Young Labor League when it formed in 1935, and was elected its inaugural secretary in March.

In December 1936, at the age of 26, Burke nominated himself to be the Labor candidate for the Division of Perth in the Australian House of Representatives. He won preselection against one other contender the following year, but lost in the 1937 federal election to the incumbent Nationalist member, Walter Nairn, who achieved roughly 60 percent of the vote. In the 1940 federal election, the Labor Party, led by John Curtin, came close to defeating the Coalition. The following year, the Coalition government fell and Curtin became prime minister. Burke did not contest the election, likely due to his impending marriage. On 4 January 1941, he married Madeline Muirson Orr, a dressmaker, at St Joseph's Catholic Church in Subiaco. They moved into a house in Highgate, in Perth's inner north.

Burke enlisted with the Royal Australian Air Force in January 1943, joining the ground staff at Kalgoorlie. In the August 1943 federal election though, he was elected as the member for Perth in the Australian House of Representatives, defeating the United Australia Party's Walter Nairn. Burke was transferred to the Air Force Reserve two months later.

Burke aspired to become treasurer in a Labor government under Kim Beazley Sr., but by the defeat of Labor in 1949, Burke had not attained a cabinet position.

Burke was strongly anti-communist. In 1950, against the wishes of Labor leader Ben Chifley, Burke convinced the executive of the Western Australian branch of the Labor Party to support the Communist Party Dissolution Bill, which would ban the Communist Party of Australia. This gave supporters of the bill a majority in the federal executive. The bill passed, but was struck down by the High Court as unconstitutional. Burke opposed Labor leader H. V. Evatt due to his less anti-communist positions. After the 1954 federal election, Burke challenged Evatt to the leadership of the Labor Party in August. Burke polled relatively well, considering the challenge was a surprise to the party and Burke had made no effort to organise support, being defeated by Evatt 68–20. In October 1954, he unsuccessfully tried to trigger another leadership ballot.

At the federal conference in Hobart in March 1955, Burke defied the state executive's instructions to support Evatt. Burke and several other Labor politicians were banned from representing Western Australia at federal conferences. Despite expectations, following the Australian Labor Party split of 1955, Burke did not join the Democratic Labor Party (Australia, 1955), known later as the Democratic Labor Party. In the 1955 federal election, Burke was defeated as the member for Perth by Liberal candidate Fred Chaney.

== Later life ==
After his continual criticism of Evatt, Burke was expelled from the Labor Party in 1957. Despite Chamberlain's objections, Burke was readmitted to the party in 1964. He sought preselection for his former seat of Perth in 1965 and 1968.

Two of Burke's son were elected to the Western Australian Legislative Assembly: Terry Burke was the member for the state seat of Perth from 1968 to 1987, and Brian Burke was the member for Balcatta and Balga. Brian was later the premier of Western Australia from 1983 to 1988.

A heavy smoker, Burke died of a myocardial infarction on 17 January 1973 in Perth. He was buried at Karrakatta Cemetery.

== See also ==
- Electoral results for the Division of Perth

Parliament of Australia
Preceded by Walter Nairn	Member for Perth; 21 August 1943 – 10 December 1955	Succeeded by Fred Chaney
