= George John Bell =

Australian politician (1872–1944)

The Honourable Sir George Bell KCMG DSO VD
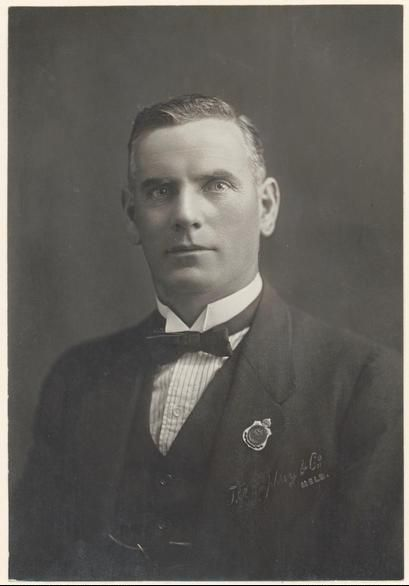

9th Speaker of the Australian House of Representatives
- In office 23 October 1934 – 19 November 1940
- Preceded by: George Mackay
- Succeeded by: Walter Nairn

Member of the Australian Parliament for Darwin
- In office 13 December 1919 – 16 December 1922
- Preceded by: William Spence
- Succeeded by: Joshua Whitsitt
- In office 14 November 1925 – 7 July 1943
- Preceded by: Joshua Whitsitt
- Succeeded by: Enid Lyons

Personal details
- Born: 29 November 1872 Sale, Victoria
- Died: 5 May 1944 (aged 71) Burnie, Tasmania
- Party: Nationalist (1919–31); UAP (1931–43)
- Occupation: Soldier

Military service
- Allegiance: Australia
- Years of service: 1892–1927
- Rank: Lieutenant Colonel
- Commands: 26th Light Horse Regiment (1920–27); 3rd Light Horse Regiment (1917–19)
- Battles/wars: Second Boer War; Siege of Mafeking; Battle of Diamond Hill; First World War; Gallipoli Campaign; Battle of Romani; Battle of Beersheba; Capture of Jericho
- Awards: Knight Commander of the Order of St Michael and St George; Distinguished Service Order; Mentioned in Despatches (2); Volunteer Officers' Decoration

Sir George John Bell KCMG DSO VD (29 November 1872 – 5 March 1944) was an Australian soldier and politician. He served as Speaker of the House of Representatives from 1934 to 1940. He represented the Tasmanian seat of Darwin in the House of Representatives from 1919 to 1922 and from 1925 to 1943, representing the Nationalist Party until 1931 and then the United Australia Party (UAP).

== Early life ==
Bell was born in Sale in the state of Victoria, and was the eldest son of George Bell and Catherine Bell, née Hussey. Bell was one of 15 siblings, including William R. Bell. He received his education in the outback of Victoria, and worked on his parents’ farm, before joining the Victorian Mounted Rifles.

== Military career ==
=== Boer War ===
Following the outbreak of the Second Boer War, Bell enlisted in Victorian Mounted Infantry as a private. Although travelling back to Australia after the disbandment of the Infantry, he returned to the war, joining the Victorian Mounted Rifles Contingent. He was commissioned as a lieutenant, and was severely injured in a battle in early 1902. He was awarded a Distinguished Service Order for his services in the war.

=== World War I ===
After the war, Bell returned to Australia, settling in the state of Tasmania. On the outbreak of the First World War, Bell enlisted for the Australian Imperial Forces, and was dispatched for training in Egypt. He served at Gallipoli and Sinai, and was promoted from the rank of lieutenant to captain, to major and finally, to lieutenant colonel. Given command of the 3rd Light Horse Regiment, Bell's most successful conquest was the capture of Es Salt, and the later successful evacuation of British troops from the stronghold. He was appointed a Companion of the Order of St Michael and St George in April, 1919.

After his return to Australia, Bell married Ellen Rothwell on 5 November 1919.

== Politics ==
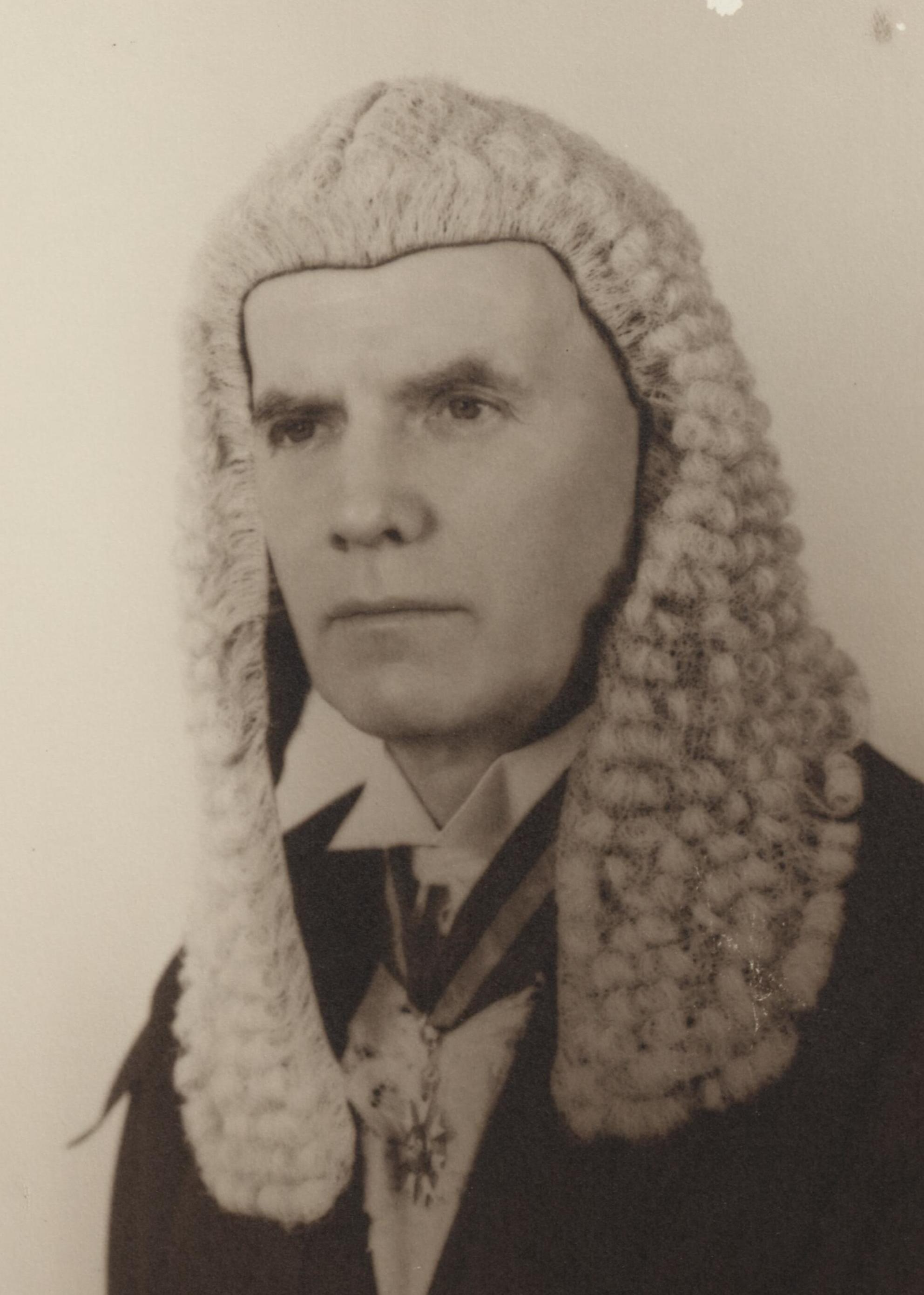
Bell in speaker's garb

Soon after his demobilisation, Bell was proposed as a candidate for federal parliament at the 1919 federal election with the support of the Returned Soldiers and Sailors Imperial League and the Tasmanian Farmers and Stockholders Association. He narrowly defeated the Australian Labor Party (ALP) candidate Joseph Lyons in the seat of Darwin, with a campaign that "appealed to a largely rural electorate by condemning government extravagance and the favouring of 'the crowds of workers in the cities'".

Bell joined the Nationalist Party in federal parliament. He was approached to join the Country Party prior to the 1922 election, but declined and was defeated by Country Party candidate Joshua Whitsitt with the help of ALP preferences. He reclaimed his seat in 1925 and retained it with comfortable majorities at the next six elections, joining the United Australia Party (UAP) upon its creation in 1931.

In 1927, he was appointed as aide-de-camp to the Governor-General of Australia. Elected as chairman of committees in the House of Representatives in 1932, he became Speaker in 1934. Appointed as Knight Commander of the Order of St Michael and St George in 1941, Bell retired from politics in 1943. He died from cardiovascular disease, and was buried in the Burnie Anglican cemetery, following a state funeral.

== Personal life ==
Max Meldrum's 1939 portrait of Bell was awarded the Archibald Prize for portraiture, and was subsequently acquired by the Tasmanian Museum and Art Gallery.

Parliament of Australia
Preceded by George Mackay	Speaker of the Australian House of Representatives; 1934–1940	Succeeded by Walter Nairn
Preceded by William Spence	Member for Darwin; 1919–1922	Succeeded by Joshua Whitsitt
Preceded by Joshua Whitsitt	Member for Darwin; 1925–1943	Succeeded by Enid Lyons
