= Edward Mann (Australian politician) =

Australian politician and radio commentator

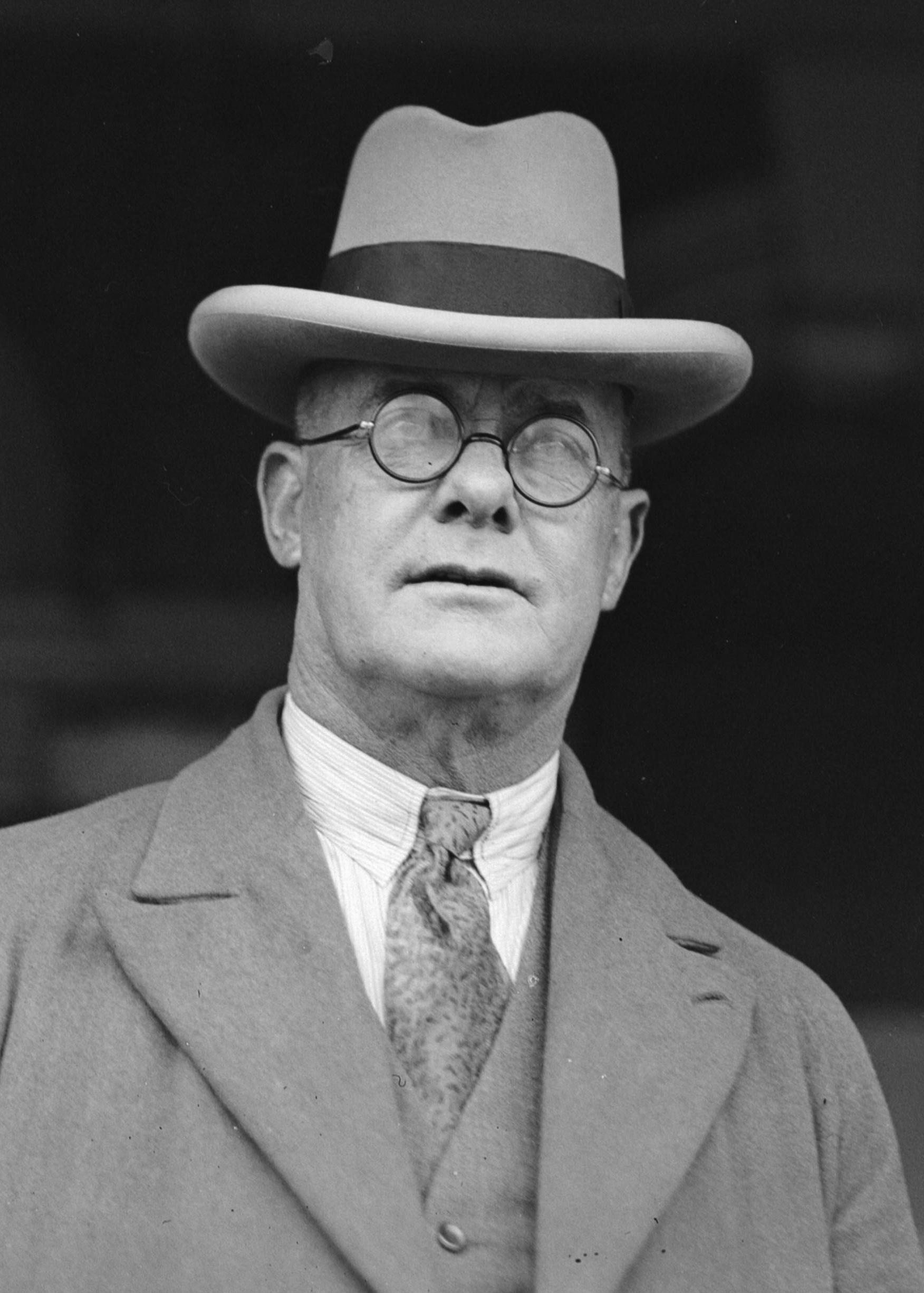
- Mann in 1929

Member of the Australian Parliament for Perth
- In office 16 December 1922 – 12 October 1929
- Preceded by: James Fowler
- Succeeded by: Walter Nairn

Personal details
- Born: 11 August 1874 Mount Gambier, South Australia
- Died: 15 November 1951 (aged 77) Melbourne, Victoria
- Party: Nationalist (1922–29); Independent (1929)
- Spouse(s): 1) Estelle Frances Leonie Hicks; 2) Gladys Alice Kubale
- Education: University of Melbourne
- Occupation: Government analyst

Edward Alexander Mann (11 August 1874 – 15 November 1951) was an Australian politician and radio commentator. He held the Western Australian seat of Perth in the House of Representatives from 1922 to 1929.

== Early life ==
Mann was born in Mount Gambier, South Australia and was the brother of Frederick Mann, Chief Justice of the Supreme Court of Victoria from 1935 to 1944. He was educated at the University of Melbourne and was appointed government analyst in Western Australia in 1895 and set up the government laboratory in Perth. In 1901 he married Estelle Frances Leonie Hicks. He was appointed to the Commonwealth Advisory Council for Science and Industry from 1916 to 1920, although his participation was limited, partly due to the distance between Perth and Melbourne.

== Political career ==
Mann was elected as the member for Perth at the 1922 election, defeating disendorsed Nationalist James Fowler. He was responsible for the passage of the Electoral Act 1924 through the House of Representatives, introducing compulsory voting. Like his predecessor he opposed high tariffs and he publicly criticised party leader and Prime Minister, Stanley Bruce over the issue. In 1929, he attacked the government over its failure to prosecute John Brown for illegally locking out his employees, resulting in his exclusion from party meetings. Later in the year, he voted with Billy Hughes and three others to bring the Bruce government down over the Maritime Industries Bill—which would have abolished the Commonwealth Court of Conciliation and Arbitration—forcing it to the 1929 election and its defeat. He also lost his seat running as an independent.

== Radio career ==
Mann soon became the Australian Broadcasting Commission's chief commentator with his daily news session, At home and abroad, and a weekly programme, The news behind the news. He spoke anonymously under the pseudonym of "The Watchman", and regularly offended the government with his trenchant criticism. The Menzies government censored him and he resigned from the ABC to contest the seat of Flinders at the September election, but lost narrowly. He could not regain a satisfactory position on the ABC and moved to commercial radio, particularly the Major Broadcasting Network where he continued to use the pseudonym "The Watchman". Mann was well known as a regular panelist on the Australian radio version of Information Please.

He married Gladys Alice Kubale in 1949. He died of a heart attack on a Melbourne tram, survived by his second wife and a son and two daughters of his first marriage.

== Notes ==
Parliament of Australia
Preceded by James Fowler	Member for Perth; 1922–1929	Succeeded by Walter Nairn
