= Joshua Whitsitt =

Australian politician

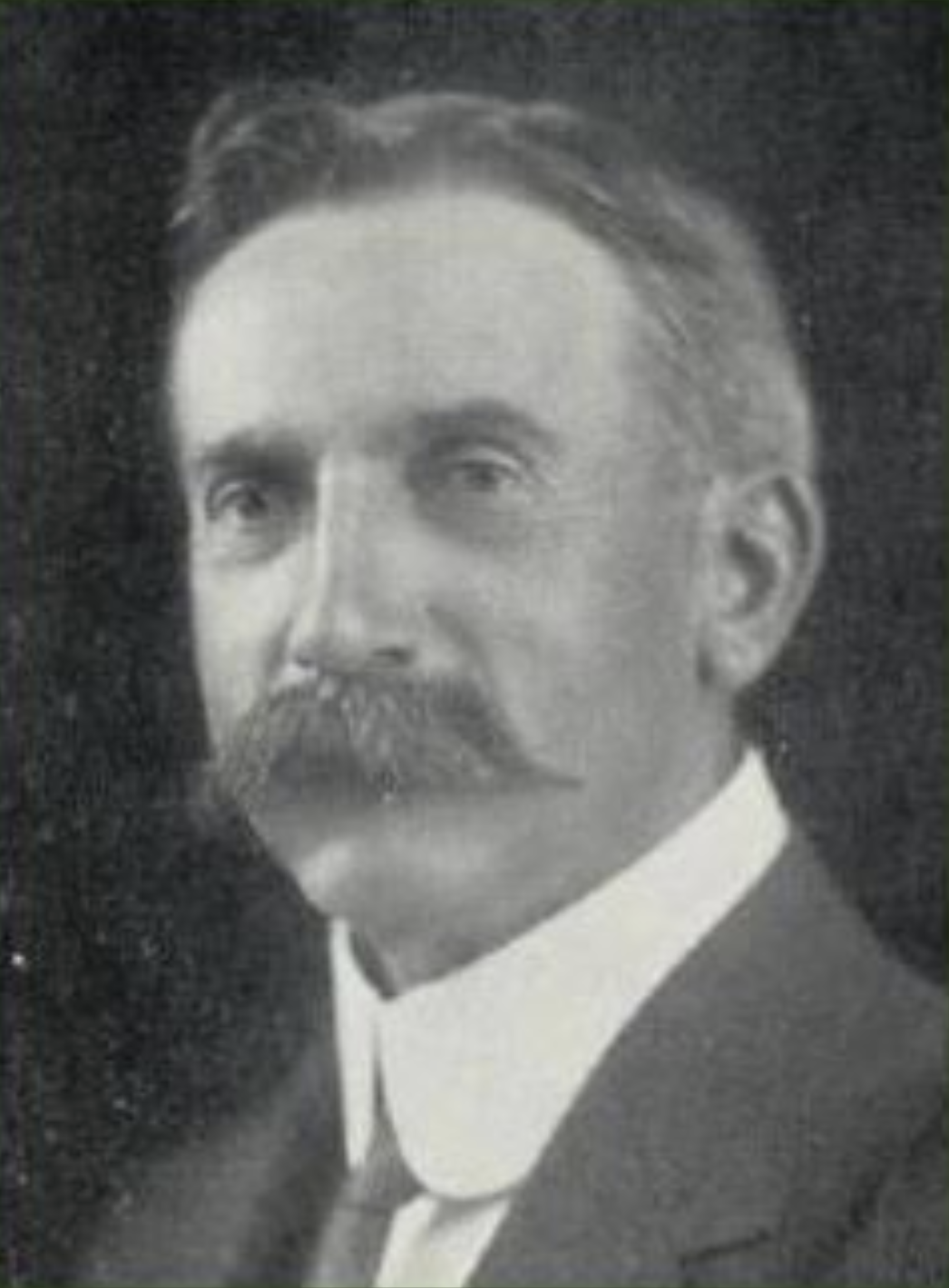

Member of the Australian Parliament for Darwin
- In office 16 December 1922 – 3 October 1925
- Preceded by: George Bell
- Succeeded by: George Bell

Personal details
- Born: 26 September 1869 Rosslea, County Fermanagh, Ireland, United Kingdom
- Died: 14 September 1943 (aged 73) Cooee, Tasmania, Australia
- Occupation: Farmer

Joshua Thomas Hoskins Whitsitt (26 September 1869 – 14 September 1943) was an Australian politician. He was a member of the Tasmanian House of Assembly from 1909 to 1922 and a member of the Australian House of Representatives from 1922 to 1925.

== Early life and business career ==
Whitsitt was born in County Fermanagh and attended college in Belfast. He visited Tasmania at the age of eighteen, intending to return to Ireland, but instead remained in Australia. He worked as an accountant for the Bank of Australasia at Burnie, where he was also a prominent tennis player, winning the state doubles championship and the 1894 intercolonial matches. He married Bertha Quiggin in May 1899. He resigned from the bank in 1900 to become resident secretary of the Blyth Iron Mine Company, while also becoming a farmer and grazier at "Roselea", his property at Cooee.

== State politics ==
In December 1908, Whitsitt announced that he would contest the 1909 state election as an independent candidate for the multi-member seat of Darwin. He advocated a "reformation scheme" including reforming the system for the selection of Crown lands, prioritising agricultural and mining industries and developing the west coast, altering the role of local government in rates assessment and taxation collection, and changes to the overall taxation system. He also supported a poll tax, opposed further extension of the Legislative Council franchise, opposed the nationalisation of industries and the introduction of industrial relations legislation, and supported increasing the salary of members of parliament while reducing their number in both houses. Whitsitt suggested that he could prevent industrial strife by "studying mankind", and upon being asked at a public meeting how he would protect workers from unscrupulous employers, he answered "are there any?"

He retired from the campaign in February on the basis that he had "urgent business interests" requiring travel to England, but re-entered the race in March, postponing his trip until April. He missed the postal cutoff for the close of nominations but saved his candidacy by engaging a motor from the Emu Bay Railway to send the form to Zeehan. He won the sixth and final seat in Darwin at the expense of Treasurer Don Urquhart, whom he had criticised heavily in the campaign. Following his election, there was considerable debate in the media and in parliament about the possibility that he could be unseated due to being overseas and thus being unable to be personally sworn in during the first sitting of parliament. This was resolved in July by granting Whitsitt a leave of absence, allowing him to be belatedly sworn in on 21 September. He then took his seat on the government benches (of Elliott Lewis).

He voted to support the Lewis government in a no-confidence vote in September, but crossed the floor to bring the Lewis government down in October, reaffirming his independence and noting that as the 1909 anti-Labor Fusion that had formed the Commonwealth Liberal Party had happened whilst he was in England, it did not apply to him. He then crossed the floor again within the same week to bring the new Labor Earle government down. He cited as his reasons for the abrupt turnaround being disagreement with the Lewis government over government policy on the potato industry, the resolution of a "mutiny" within the Liberals by Norman Ewing and his supporters, and Whitsitt's opposition to a Labor attempt to introduce full adult suffrage.

He successfully defended his seat in 1916 and 1919.

== Federal politics ==
In 1922, he transferred to federal politics, winning the federal seat of Darwin in the Australian House of Representatives for the Country Party, defeating sitting Nationalist member George Bell. He retired in 1925, returning to farming. Whitsitt died in 1943.

Parliament of Australia
Preceded by George Bell	Member for Darwin; 1922–1925	Succeeded by George Bell
