= 1943 Australian federal election =

Federal Election in Australia in 1943

- 21 August 1943

All 75 (Note: The Northern Territory had one seat, but members for the territories did not have full voting rights until 1966 and did not count toward government formation.) seats in the House of Representatives 38 seats were needed for a majority in the House 19 (of the 36) seats in the Senate
- Registered: 4,466,637 ▲5.36%
- Turnout: 4,245,369 (96.32%) (Note: Turnout in contested seats) (▲1.50 pp)
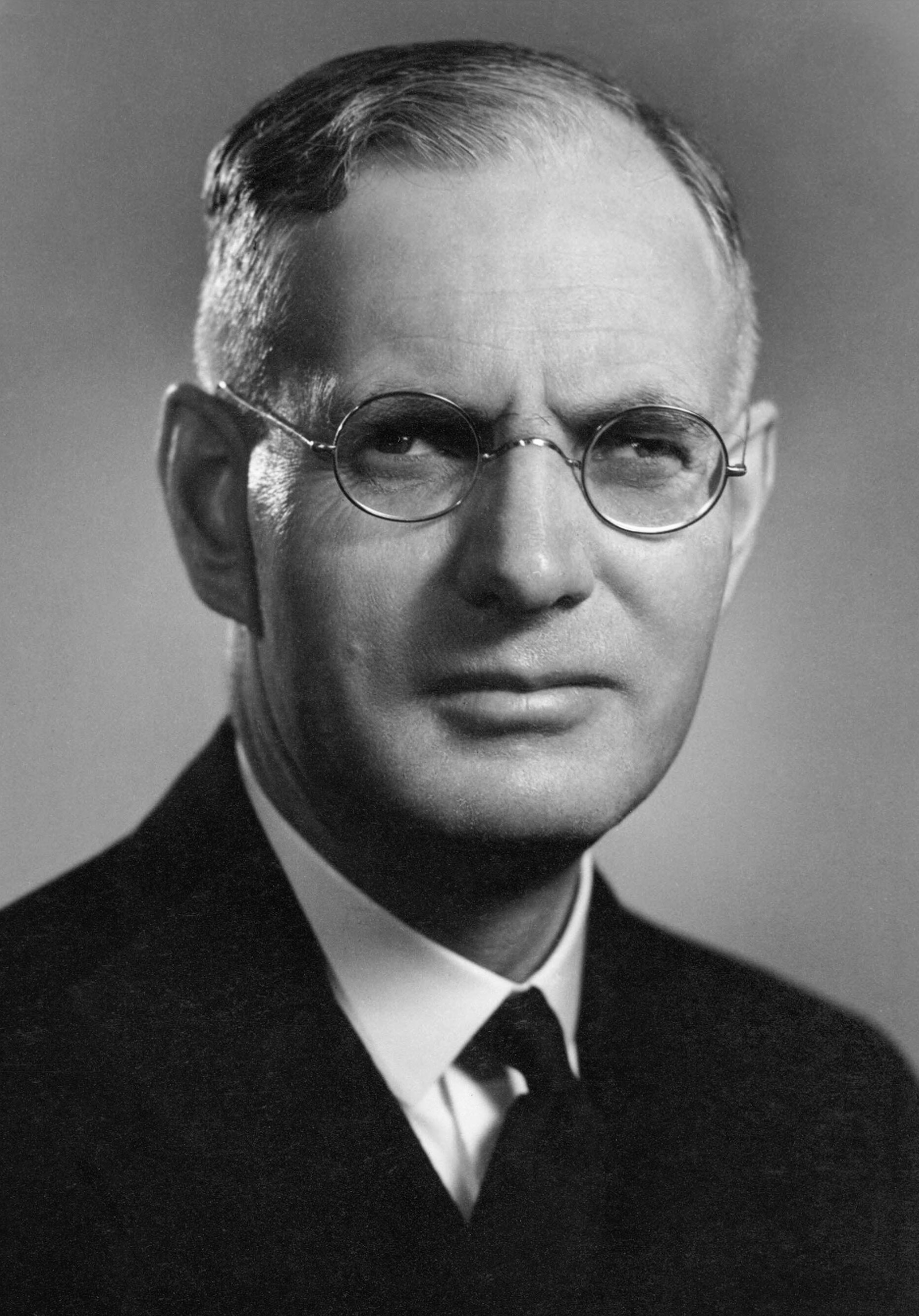

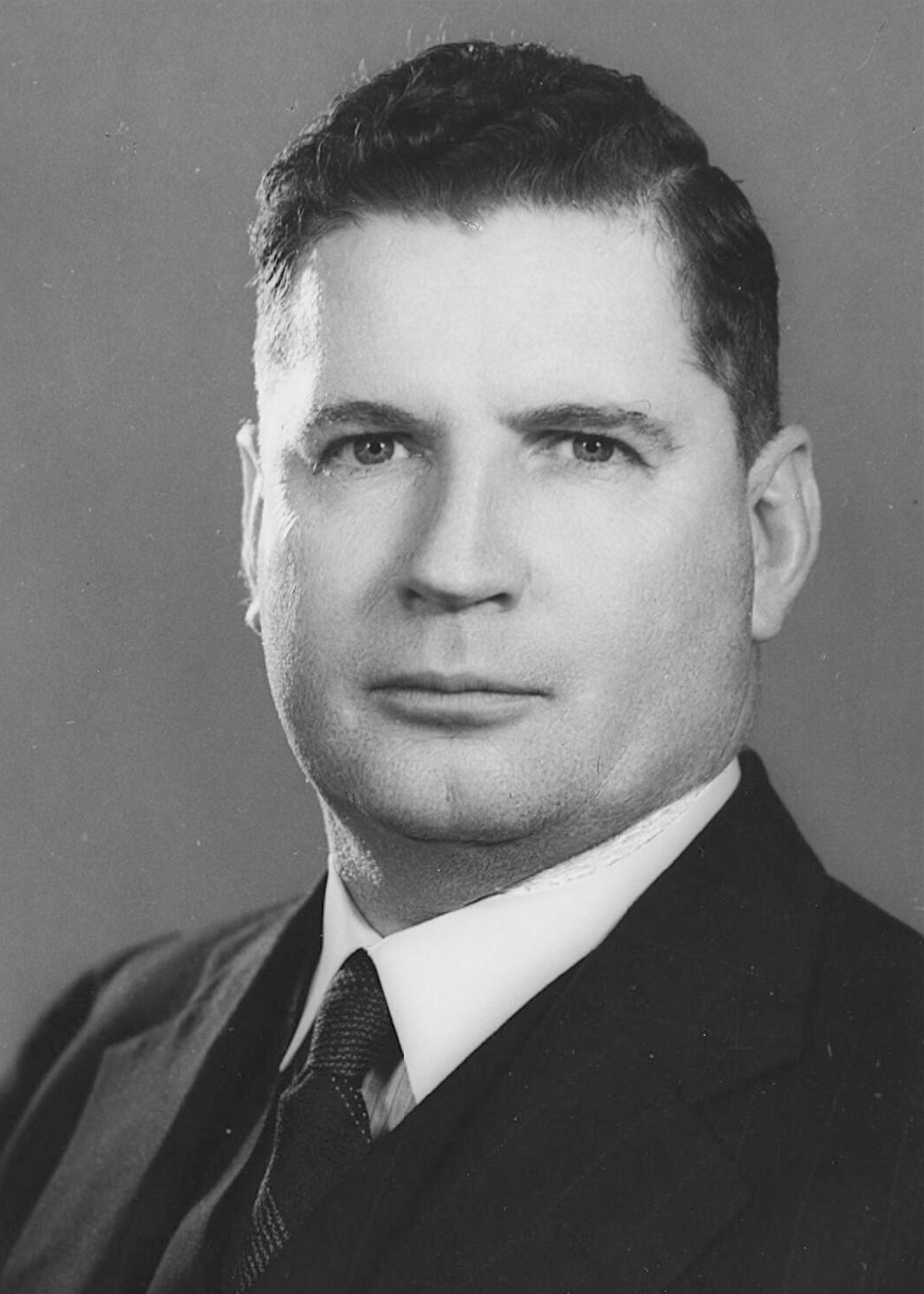
	First party	Second party
Leader	John Curtin	Arthur Fadden
Party	Labor	Country–United Australia Coalition
Leader since	1 October 1935	12 March 1941 (Note: Fadden was appointed acting leader of the Country Party in October 1940. He remained in that position until a March 1941 Country Party pre-sessional meeting, where Fadden was formally appointed leader of the party.)
Leader's seat	Fremantle (WA)	Darling Downs (Qld.)
Last election	32 seats	36 seats
Seats won	49 seats	23 seats
Seat change	▲17	▼13
Primary vote	2,058,582	1,248,506 (Note: The total for the Coalition. Country Party total was: 350,378.)
Percentage	49.93%	30.44%
Swing	▲9.77	▼13.31
TPP	58.20%	41.80%
TPP swing	▲7.90	▼7.90
- Results by division for the House of Representatives, shaded by winning party's margin of victory.
Prime Minister before election
John Curtin
Labor
Subsequent Prime Minister
John Curtin
Labor

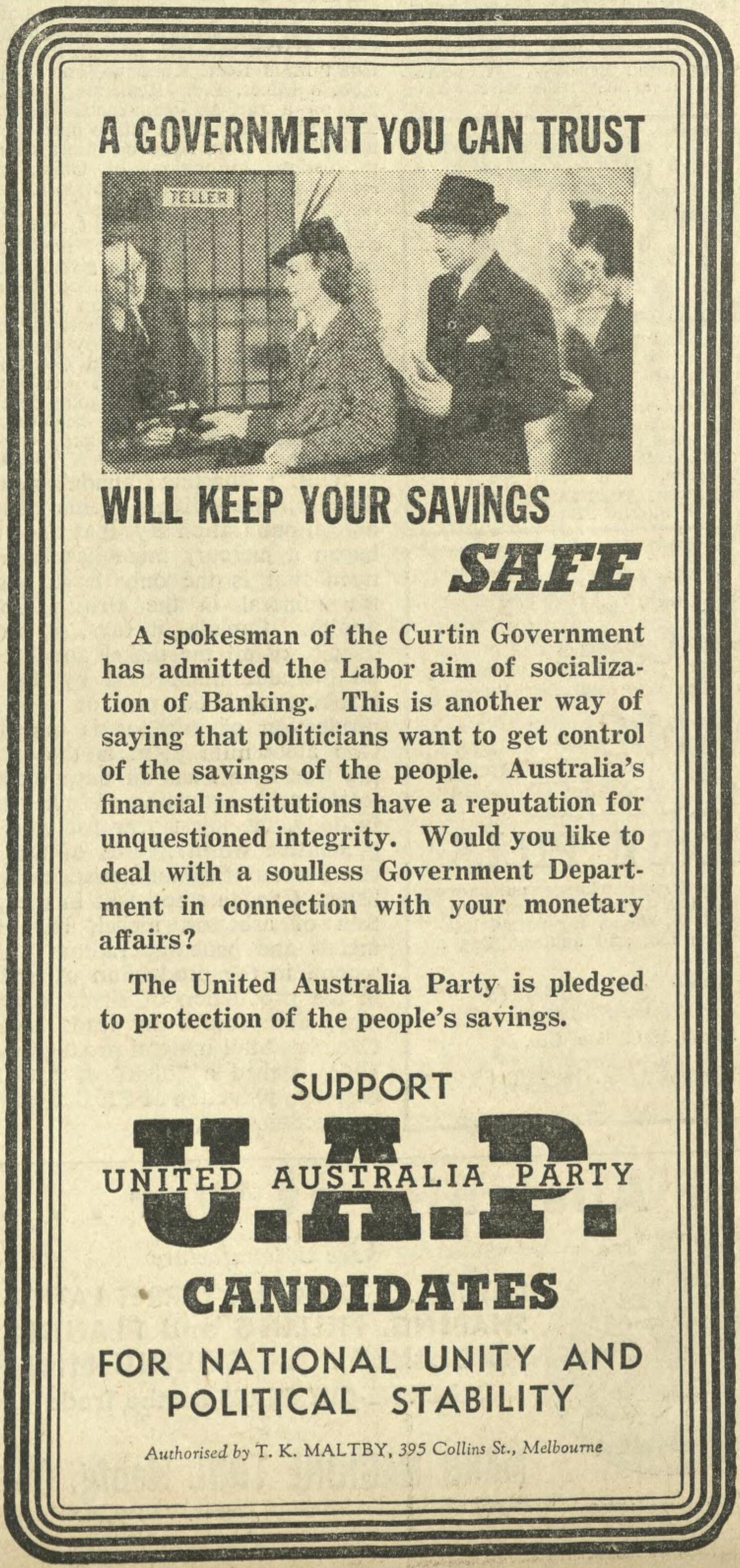
Advertisement used by the UAP during the 1943 Australian federal election, its final campaign before the party was wound up

A federal election was held in Australia on 21 August 1943. All 74 seats in the House of Representatives and 19 of the 36 seats in the Senate were up for election. The incumbent Labor Party, led by Prime Minister John Curtin, defeated the opposition Country–UAP coalition led by Arthur Fadden in a landslide. The Labor party's two-party preferred (TPP) result of 58.2% is its highest in its history.

Fadden, the leader of the Country Party, was serving as Leader of the Opposition despite the Country Party holding fewer seats in parliament than the United Australia Party (UAP). He was previously the Prime Minister in August 1941, after he was chosen by the coalition parties to lead the government after the forced resignation of Prime Minister Robert Menzies, the UAP leader. However, he stayed in office for only six weeks before the two independents who held the balance of power joined Labor in voting down his budget. Governor-General Lord Gowrie was reluctant to call an election for a parliament barely a year old, especially considering the international situation. At his urging, the independents threw their support to Labor for the remainder of the parliamentary term.

Over the next two years, Curtin proved to be a very popular and effective leader, and the Coalition was unable to get the better of him. A number of groups also split away from the UAP prior to the election, the most prominent of which was the Liberal Democratic Party (LDP). Labor thus went into the election in a commanding position, and flipped 13 seats on a 7.9% swing, winning 50.2% of the primary (first preference) vote and 58.2% of the two-party preferred vote.

The Coalition was reduced to 23 seats, including only nine for the Country Party. Notably, Labor won every seat in Western Australia and all but one in South Australia: Archie Cameron, the member for Barker in South Australia, was left as the only Coalition MP outside the eastern states. The LDP did not win any seats.

This election was significant in the fact that it resulted in the election of the first female member of the House of Representatives, the UAP's Enid Lyons for Darwin, Tasmania, and the first female Senator, Labor's Dorothy Tangney, in Western Australia. The election also remains Labor's greatest federal victory in terms of proportion of seats and two-party votes in the lower house, and primary vote in the Senate as of 2022.

The lack of effective opposition to the Labor party in the lead up to and following the election became the catalyst for the creation of the Liberal Party of Australia from the ashes of the UAP, and for George Cole, Keith Murdoch and other big business magnates to form the conservative think tank the Institute of Public Affairs.

This was the last major election that did not involve the current Liberal and Labor Party competition.

== Results ==
=== House of Representatives ===
1943 Australian Federal Election (House of Representatives)

House of Reps (IRV) — 1943–46—Turnout 95.13% (CV) — Informal 3.50%
Party	First preference votes	%	Swing	Seats	Change
Labor	2,058,582	49.93	+9.77	49	+13
UAP–Country coalition	1,284,506	30.44	–13.31	23	–13
United Australia	898,128	21.90	-8.34	14	-9
Country	350,378	8.54	-4.97	9	-4
One Parliament	87,112	2.11	New	0	0
Communist	81,816	1.98	New	0	0
Liberal Democratic	42,149	1.48	New	0	0
State Labor	29,752	0.72	-1.89	0	0
Independents	501,054	12.15	+4.69	3 (Note: Including Northern Territory)	0
Total	4,100,584			75	
Two-party-preferred (estimated)
Labor	Win	58.20	+7.90	49	+13
UAP–Country coalition		41.80	−7.90	23	-13

First preference vote
Labor	49.93%
United Australia	21.90%
Independent	12.15%
Country	8.54%
One Parliament	2.11%
Communist	1.98%
Liberal Democratic	1.48%
State Labor	0.72%

Two-party-preferred vote (estimated)
Labor	58.20%
Coalition	41.80%

Parliament seats
Labor	66.22%
United Australia	18.92%
Country	12.16%
Independent	2.70%

=== Senate ===
Senate (PBV) — 1943–46 — Turnout 96.31% (CV) — Informal 9.73%
Party	First preference votes	%	Swing	Seats won	Seats held	Change
Labor	2,139,164	55.10	+17.57	19	22	+5
Country–UAP Coalition	1,481,563	38.15	–12.26	0	14	–5
Country–UAP joint ticket (NSW & Vic)	995,910	25.65	—			±0
Country–National (Qld)	184,181	4.74	—			±0
Liberal & Country League (SA)	148,419	3.82	—			±0
Nationalist–Country joint ticket (WA)	101,738	2.62	—			±0
United Australia (Tas)	51,315	1.32	—			±0
Christian New Order	101,247	2.61	—			±0
Queensland Country	37,350	0.96	—			±0
One Parliament	29,700	0.77	—			±0
Monetary Reform	19,401	0.48	—			±0
Independent	75,105	1.93	–0.39	0	0	±0
Total	3,882,120	100		19	36	

== Seats changing hands ==
Seat	Pre-1943			Swing	Post-1943		
Seat	Party	Member	Margin	Swing	Margin	Member	Party
Adelaide, SA	United Australia	Fred Stacey	4.7	20.3	15.6	Cyril Chambers	Labor
Barker, SA	Country	Archie Cameron (Note: Ran as candidate for the UAP)	N/A	14.2	1.7	Archie Cameron	United Australia
Boothby, SA	United Australia	Grenfell Price	6.6	16.1	0.9	Thomas Sheehy	Labor
Denison, Tas	United Australia	Arthur Beck	1.1	10.1	9.0	Frank Gaha	Labor
Eden-Monaro, NSW	United Australia	John Perkins	4.8	10.8	5.4	Allan Fraser	Labor
Grey, SA	Country	Oliver Badman	7.7	10.2	2.5	Edgar Russell	Labor
Hume, NSW	Country	Thomas Collins	0.9	7.2	6.3	Arthur Fuller	Labor
Lilley, Qld	United Australia	William Jolly	9.6	9.9	0.4	Jim Hadley	Labor
Maranoa, Qld	Labor	Frank Baker	1.6	2.6	1.0	Charles Adermann	Country
Martin, NSW	United Australia	William McCall	2.6	8.3	5.7	Fred Daly	Labor
Parkes, NSW	United Australia	Charles Marr	7.4	10.3	2.9	Les Haylen	Labor
Perth, WA	United Australia	Walter Nairn	14.5	20.5	6.0	Tom Burke	Labor
Robertson, NSW	United Australia	Eric Spooner	0.3	9.2	8.9	Thomas Williams	Labor
Swan, WA	Country	Thomas Marwick	7.5	10.5	3.0	Don Mountjoy	Labor
Wakefield, SA	United Australia	Jack Duncan-Hughes	3.4	4.6	1.2	Albert Smith	Labor

== See also ==
- Candidates of the Australian federal election, 1943
- Members of the Australian House of Representatives, 1943–1946
- Members of the Australian Senate, 1944–1947
