= Division of Darwin =

Former Australian federal electoral division

Darwin Australian House of Representatives Division
- Created: 1903
- Abolished: 1955
- Namesake: Charles Darwin

The Division of Darwin was an Australian Electoral Division in Tasmania. It was named after Charles Darwin, who visited Australia in 1836, and was not related to the city of Darwin in the Northern Territory (also named after Charles Darwin).

Prior to 1903, the entire state of Tasmania was covered by a single Division of Tasmania. In 1903, the division was split into five divisions, with one of them being Darwin. It was eventually abolished in 1955, when it was replaced by the Division of Braddon; this was effectively an administrative renaming only, as no electoral boundaries changed.

Throughout its history, the division was located in north-western and western Tasmania, including the towns of Burnie and Devonport. It gained Devonport from the neighbouring division of Wilmot in the 1922 redistribution.

After 1917, it was always in the hands of the non-Labor parties. Prominent members included King O'Malley, a colourful Labor member, Sir George Bell, Speaker of the House, and Dame Enid Lyons, the first woman elected to the House of Representatives.

== Members ==
Image	Member	Party	Term	Notes
	King O'Malley (1854–1953)	Labor	16 December 1903 – 5 May 1917	Previously held the Division of Tasmania. Served as minister under Fisher and Hughes. Lost seat
	Charles Howroyd (1867–1917)	Nationalist	5 May 1917 – 10 May 1917	Previously held the Tasmanian House of Assembly seat of Bass. Died in office
	William Spence (1846–1926)	Nationalist	30 June 1917 – 13 December 1919	Previously held the Division of Darling. Did not contest in 1919. Failed to win the Division of Batman
	George Bell (1872–1944)	Nationalist	13 December 1919 – 16 December 1922	Lost seat
	Joshua Whitsitt (1869–1943)	Country	16 December 1922 – 3 October 1925	Previously held the Tasmanian House of Assembly seat of Darwin. Retired
	Sir George Bell (1872–1944)	Nationalist	14 November 1925 – 7 May 1931	Served as Speaker during the Lyons, Page and Menzies Governments. Retired
	Sir George Bell (1872–1944)	United Australia	7 May 1931 – 7 July 1943	Served as Speaker during the Lyons, Page and Menzies Governments. Retired
	Dame Enid Lyons (1897–1981)	United Australia	21 August 1943 – 21 February 1945	Served as minister under Menzies. Retired. First woman elected to the House of Representatives
	Dame Enid Lyons (1897–1981)	Liberal	21 February 1945 – 19 March 1951	Served as minister under Menzies. Retired. First woman elected to the House of Representatives
	Aubrey Luck (1900–1999)	Liberal	28 April 1951 – 10 December 1955	Transferred to the Division of Braddon after Darwin was abolished in 1955
