= Electoral results for the Division of Fremantle =

Australian division election results

This article lists electoral results for the Division of Fremantle in Australian federal elections from the division's creation in 1901 to the present.

== Members ==
Member	Party	Term
Elias Solomon	Free Trade	1901–1903
William Carpenter	Labour	1903–1906
William Hedges	Western Australian	1906–1909
William Hedges	Liberal	1909–1913
Reginald Burchell	Labor	1913–1916
Reginald Burchell	National Labor	1916–1917
Reginald Burchell	Nationalist	1917–1922
William Watson	Independent	1922–1928
John Curtin	Labor	1928–1931
William Watson	United Australia	1931–1934
John Curtin	Labor	1934–1945
Kim Beazley Sr.	Labor	1945 by–1977
John Dawkins	Labor	1977–1994
Carmen Lawrence	Labor	1994 by–2007
Melissa Parke	Labor	2007–2016
Josh Wilson	Labor	2016–present

== Election results ==
=== Elections in the 2020s ===
==== 2025 ====
2025 Australian federal election: Fremantle
Party	Candidate	Votes	%	±%
Labor	Josh Wilson	39,427	38.60	−5.46
Independent	Kate Hulett	23,500	23.01	+23.01
Liberal	Tait Marston	19,254	18.85	−5.30
Greens	Amy Warne	11,802	11.56	−6.47
One Nation	Hannah Marriner	6,245	6.11	+2.94
Socialist Alliance	Joshua Last	970	0.95	−0.27
Citizens	John Bird	932	0.91	+0.91
Total formal votes		102,130	96.45	+2.26
Informal votes		3,764	3.55	−2.26
Turnout		105,894	89.49	+3.84
Notional two-party-preferred count
Labor	Josh Wilson	70,145	68.68	+1.75
Liberal	Tait Marston	31,985	31.32	−1.75
Two-candidate-preferred result
Labor	Josh Wilson	51,765	50.69	−16.24
Independent	Kate Hulett	50,365	49.31	+49.31
Labor hold				

==== 2022 ====
2022 Australian federal election: Fremantle
Party	Candidate	Votes	%	±%
Labor	Josh Wilson	43,111	43.97	+5.95
Liberal	Bill Koul	23,749	24.22	−10.75
Greens	Felicity Townsend	17,790	18.14	+2.14
One Nation	William Edgar	3,060	3.12	−0.71
Great Australian	Ben Tilbury	2,293	2.34	+2.34
Western Australia	Janetia Knapp	2,248	2.29	−0.27
United Australia	Stella Jinman	2,000	2.04	+0.10
Federation	Cathy Gavranich	1,367	1.39	+1.39
Liberal Democrats	Yan Loh	1,251	1.28	+1.28
Socialist Alliance	Sam Wainwright	1,184	1.21	+0.12
Total formal votes		98,053	94.21	−0.39
Informal votes		6,025	5.79	+0.39
Turnout		104,078	89.12	−2.11
Two-party-preferred result
Labor	Josh Wilson	65,585	66.89	+9.97
Liberal	Bill Koul	32,468	33.11	−9.97
Labor hold		Swing	+9.97	

Alluvial diagram for preference flows in the seat of Fremantle in the 2022 federal election. indicates at what stage the winning candidate had over 50% of the votes and was declared the winner.

=== Elections in the 2010s ===
==== 2019 ====
2019 Australian federal election: Fremantle
Party	Candidate	Votes	%	±%
Labor	Josh Wilson	34,636	38.02	−2.97
Liberal	Nicole Robins	31,862	34.97	−1.90
Greens	Jesse Hutchinson	14,574	16.00	−1.74
One Nation	Brett Weary	3,485	3.83	+3.83
Western Australia	Janetia Knapp	2,333	2.56	+2.56
United Australia	Fatima Lever	1,767	1.94	+1.94
Christians	Laetisia Mulder	1,456	1.60	+1.60
Socialist Alliance	Sam Wainwright	990	1.09	−0.56
Total formal votes		91,103	94.60	−1.40
Informal votes		5,199	5.40	+1.40
Turnout		96,302	91.38	+2.57
Two-party-preferred result
Labor	Josh Wilson	51,852	56.92	−0.60
Liberal	Nicole Robins	39,251	43.08	+0.60
Labor hold		Swing	−0.60	

==== 2018 by-election ====
Fremantle by-election: 28 July 2018
Party	Candidate	Votes	%	±%
Labor	Josh Wilson	33,277	52.62	+11.63
Greens	Dorinda Cox	10,456	16.53	−1.21
Liberal Democrats	John Gray	8,916	14.10	+14.10
Christians	Mark Staer	3,350	5.30	+5.30
Animal Justice	Katrina Love	3,297	5.21	+5.21
Independent	Jason Spanbroek	3,239	5.12	+5.12
People's Party	James Harfouche	708	1.12	+1.12
Total formal votes		63,243	92.76	−3.24
Informal votes		4,933	7.24	+3.24
Turnout		68,176	66.09	−22.72
Two-candidate-preferred result
Labor	Josh Wilson	46,375	73.33	+15.81
Liberal Democrats	John Gray	16,868	26.67	+26.67
Labor hold		Swing	N/A	

==== 2016 ====
2016 Australian federal election: Fremantle
Party	Candidate	Votes	%	±%
Labor	Josh Wilson	34,792	40.99	−0.36
Liberal	Pierrette Kelly	31,292	36.87	−0.61
Greens	Kate Davis	15,053	17.74	+5.87
Mature Australia	Mick Connolly	2,335	2.75	+2.75
Socialist Alliance	Chris Jenkins	1,404	1.65	+0.79
Total formal votes		84,876	96.00	+2.51
Informal votes		3,535	4.00	−2.51
Turnout		88,411	88.81	−1.30
Two-party-preferred result
Labor	Josh Wilson	48,821	57.52	+2.12
Liberal	Pierrette Kelly	36,055	42.48	−2.12
Labor hold		Swing	+2.12	

==== 2013 ====
2013 Australian federal election: Fremantle
Party	Candidate	Votes	%	±%
Labor	Melissa Parke	35,554	40.82	+1.88
Liberal	Matthew Hanssen	33,219	38.14	−0.43
Greens	Jordon Steele-John	10,354	11.89	−5.76
Palmer United	Vashil Sharma	3,451	3.96	+3.96
Christians	Owen Mulder	1,163	1.34	+1.34
Katter's Australian	Richard McNaught	1,061	1.22	+1.22
Family First	Jim McCourt	811	0.93	−0.78
Socialist Alliance	Sam Wainwright	743	0.85	+0.05
Rise Up Australia	Philip Scott	416	0.48	+0.48
Protectionist	Teresa van Lieshout	205	0.24	+0.24
Citizens Electoral Council	Ron Rowlands	131	0.15	+0.15
Total formal votes		87,108	93.64	−0.93
Informal votes		5,916	6.36	+0.93
Turnout		93,024	92.26	−0.97
Two-party-preferred result
Labor	Melissa Parke	47,705	54.77	−0.93
Liberal	Matthew Hanssen	39,403	45.23	+0.93
Labor hold		Swing	−0.93	

==== 2010 ====
2010 Australian federal election: Fremantle
Party	Candidate	Votes	%	±%
Labor	Melissa Parke	32,063	38.94	−6.24
Liberal	Matt Taylor	31,755	38.57	+3.48
Greens	Kate Davis	14,531	17.65	+3.07
Family First	Larry Parsons	1,409	1.71	+0.28
Christian Democrats	Scott Robertson	1,294	1.57	−0.15
Socialist Alliance	Sanna Andrew	662	0.80	+0.35
Democratic Labor	Keith McEncroe	622	0.76	+0.76
Total formal votes		82,336	94.57	−1.18
Informal votes		4,724	5.43	+1.18
Turnout		87,060	93.27	−0.51
Two-party-preferred result
Labor	Melissa Parke	45,858	55.70	−3.44
Liberal	Matt Taylor	36,478	44.30	+3.44
Labor hold		Swing	−3.44	

=== Elections in the 2000s ===
==== 2007 ====
2007 Australian federal election: Fremantle
Party	Candidate	Votes	%	±%
Labor	Melissa Parke	36,102	45.18	+0.60
Liberal	John Jamieson	28,042	35.10	−0.84
Greens	Steve Walker	11,645	14.57	+2.79
Christian Democrats	Bill Heggers	1,376	1.72	−0.38
Family First	Andriette du Plessis	1,145	1.43	+1.43
One Nation	Sue Bateman	988	1.24	−1.08
Socialist Alliance	Sam Wainwright	361	0.45	−0.03
Citizens Electoral Council	Paul Ellison	242	0.30	−0.80
Total formal votes		79,901	95.75	+2.60
Informal votes		3,548	4.25	−2.60
Turnout		83,449	93.75	+0.55
Two-party-preferred result
Labor	Melissa Parke	47,253	59.14	+1.38
Liberal	John Jamieson	32,648	40.86	−1.38
Labor hold		Swing	+1.38	

==== 2004 ====
2004 Australian federal election: Fremantle
Party	Candidate	Votes	%	±%
Labor	Carmen Lawrence	32,394	44.58	−2.43
Liberal	Carmelo Zagami	26,118	35.94	+5.54
Greens	Nicola Paris	8,562	11.78	+2.72
One Nation	Craig Mackintosh	1,687	2.32	−3.63
Christian Democrats	Michelle Shave	1,524	2.10	+0.69
Democrats	Delys Beaumont	1,231	1.69	−3.66
Citizens Electoral Council	Damian Poole	800	1.10	+1.10
Socialist Alliance	Ian Jamieson	350	0.48	+0.48
Total formal votes		72,666	93.15	−1.14
Informal votes		5,344	6.85	+1.14
Turnout		78,010	93.20	−1.74
Two-party-preferred result
Labor	Carmen Lawrence	41,970	57.76	−2.91
Liberal	Carmelo Zagami	30,696	42.24	+2.91
Labor hold		Swing	−2.91	

==== 2001 ====
2001 Australian federal election: Fremantle
Party	Candidate	Votes	%	±%
Labor	Carmen Lawrence	34,054	47.01	−2.33
Liberal	Louise Smyth	22,025	30.40	+0.08
Greens	Robert Delves	6,565	9.06	+2.07
One Nation	Chris Reynolds	4,308	5.95	−1.75
Democrats	Rod Swift	3,878	5.35	+0.91
Christian Democrats	Michelle Shave	1,025	1.41	+1.41
	Sarah Harris	588	0.81	+0.81
Total formal votes		72,443	94.28	−1.50
Informal votes		4,393	5.72	+1.50
Turnout		76,836	95.42	
Two-party-preferred result
Labor	Carmen Lawrence	43,952	60.72	−1.57
Liberal	Louise Smyth	28,491	39.28	+1.57
Labor hold		Swing	−1.57	

=== Elections in the 1990s ===
==== 1998 ====
1998 Australian federal election: Fremantle
Party	Candidate	Votes	%	±%
Labor	Carmen Lawrence	36,631	47.45	+0.72
Liberal	Mick Tiller	25,051	32.45	−8.07
One Nation	Tony Hill	5,834	7.56	+7.56
Greens	Leonie Deegan	5,281	6.84	−0.03
Democrats	Jakica Zaknic	3,450	4.47	−1.40
Independent	Lawrence Shave	957	1.24	+1.24
Total formal votes		77,204	95.94	−0.57
Informal votes		3,269	4.06	+0.57
Turnout		80,473	94.88	−0.86
Two-party-preferred result
Labor	Carmen Lawrence	46,338	60.02	+5.81
Liberal	Mick Tiller	30,866	39.98	−5.81
Labor hold		Swing	+5.81	

==== 1996 ====
1996 Australian federal election: Fremantle
Party	Candidate	Votes	%	±%
Labor	Carmen Lawrence	33,763	46.93	−3.28
Liberal	Mick Tiller	29,067	40.40	+1.66
Greens	Alison de Garis	4,930	6.85	+0.09
Democrats	Joe Guentner	4,188	5.82	+2.61
Total formal votes		71,948	96.50	−0.53
Informal votes		2,611	3.50	+0.53
Turnout		74,559	95.75	−0.35
Two-party-preferred result
Labor	Carmen Lawrence	38,747	54.25	−3.54
Liberal	Mick Tiller	32,674	45.75	+3.54
Labor hold		Swing	−3.54	

==== 1994 by-election ====
1994 Fremantle by-election
Party	Candidate	Votes	%	±%
Labor	Carmen Lawrence	32,707	52.35	+2.15
Liberal	Geoff Hourn	23,047	36.89	–1.85
Greens	Stephen Walker	5,215	8.35	+1.59
Independent	Raymond Conder	1,506	2.41	+2.41
Total formal votes		62,475	97.40	+0.37
Informal votes		1,669	2.60	–0.37
Turnout		64,144	85.84	−10.26
Two-party-preferred result
Labor	Carmen Lawrence	36,745	58.83	+1.04
Liberal	Geoff Hourn	25,715	42.21	–1.04
Labor hold		Swing	+1.04	

==== 1993 ====
1993 Australian federal election: Fremantle
Party	Candidate	Votes	%	±%
Labor	John Dawkins	35,084	50.20	+7.27
Liberal	John Papaphotis	27,071	38.74	+5.68
Greens	Mary Salter	4,725	6.76	−3.79
Democrats	Patrick Mullins	2,247	3.22	−7.14
Natural Law	Tom Haynes	755	1.08	+1.08
Total formal votes		69,882	97.03	+1.67
Informal votes		2,141	2.97	−1.67
Turnout		72,023	96.10	
Two-party-preferred result
Labor	John Dawkins	40,375	57.79	−0.51
Liberal	John Papaphotis	29,491	42.21	+0.51
Labor hold		Swing	−0.51	

==== 1990 ====
1990 Australian federal election: Fremantle
Party	Candidate	Votes	%	±%
Labor	John Dawkins	28,009	42.9	−19.2
Liberal	Paul Stevenage	21,564	33.1	+1.6
Greens	Jennie Cary	6,886	10.6	+10.6
Democrats	Ray Tilbury	6,754	10.4	+10.4
Independent	Ian Bolas	1,370	2.1	+2.1
Grey Power	Ronnie Riley	657	1.0	+1.0
Total formal votes		65,240	95.4	
Informal votes		3,175	4.6	
Turnout		68,415	94.7	
Two-party-preferred result
Labor	John Dawkins	37,890	58.3	−5.5
Liberal	Paul Stevenage	27,106	41.7	+5.5
Labor hold		Swing	−5.5	

=== Elections in the 1980s ===
==== 1987 ====
1987 Australian federal election: Fremantle
Party	Candidate	Votes	%	±%
Labor	John Dawkins	36,646	61.1	+2.1
Liberal	Jenny van den Hoek	19,487	32.5	−1.4
National	Jack Clarke	3,834	6.4	+6.4
Total formal votes		59,967	91.8	
Informal votes		5,384	8.2	
Turnout		65,351	95.0	
Two-party-preferred result
Labor	John Dawkins	37,628	62.7	−0.2
Liberal	Jenny van den Hoek	22,338	37.3	+0.2
Labor hold		Swing	−0.2	

==== 1984 ====
1984 Australian federal election: Fremantle
Party	Candidate	Votes	%	±%
Labor	John Dawkins	33,366	59.0	−2.7
Liberal	Max Adams	19,152	33.9	+0.1
Democrats	Shirley de la Hunty	3,362	5.9	+3.4
Independent	Timothy Peach	650	1.1	+1.1
Total formal votes		56,530	90.9	
Informal votes		5,634	9.1	
Turnout		62,164	94.7	
Two-party-preferred result
Labor	John Dawkins	35,631	63.0	−1.9
Liberal	Max Adams	20,889	37.0	+1.9
Labor hold		Swing	−1.9	

==== 1983 ====
1983 Australian federal election: Fremantle
Party	Candidate	Votes	%	±%
Labor	John Dawkins	43,326	63.3	+5.2
Liberal	Max Adams	22,025	32.2	−2.1
Democrats	Colin Hull	1,733	2.5	−3.6
Socialist Labour	Timothy Peach	970	1.4	+1.4
Socialist Workers	Margo Condoleon	360	0.5	−1.0
Total formal votes		68,414	97.5	
Informal votes		1,779	2.5	
Turnout		70,193	93.8	
Two-party-preferred result
Labor	John Dawkins		66.5	+3.4
Liberal	Max Adams		33.5	−3.4
Labor hold		Swing	+3.4	

==== 1980 ====
1980 Australian federal election: Fremantle
Party	Candidate	Votes	%	±%
Labor	John Dawkins	36,272	58.1	+8.5
Liberal	Donald McLeod	21,425	34.3	−2.8
Democrats	Graham Hull	3,791	6.1	−3.8
Socialist Workers	Angelo Lopez	915	1.5	+1.5
Total formal votes		62,403	96.9	
Informal votes		1,982	3.1	
Turnout		64,385	94.0	
Two-party-preferred result
Labor	John Dawkins		63.1	+6.8
Liberal	Donald McLeod		36.9	−6.8
Labor hold		Swing	+6.8	

=== Elections in the 1970s ===
==== 1977 ====
1977 Australian federal election: Fremantle
Party	Candidate	Votes	%	±%
Labor	John Dawkins	29,700	45.1	−6.5
Liberal	Peter Ramshaw	27,372	41.6	−6.8
Democrats	John Kernott	6,491	9.9	+9.9
Communist	Vic Slater	1,305	2.0	+2.0
Progress	David Lavater	957	1.5	+1.5
Total formal votes		65,825	96.7	
Informal votes		2,235	3.3	
Turnout		68,060	95.3	
Two-party-preferred result
Labor	John Dawkins	34,113	51.8	+0.2
Liberal	Peter Ramshaw	31,712	48.2	−0.2
Labor hold		Swing	+0.2	

==== 1975 ====
1975 Australian federal election: Fremantle
Party	Candidate	Votes	%	±%
Labor	Kim Beazley Sr.	32,570	51.6	−7.8
Liberal	Leon Lapinski	30,509	48.4	+12.5
Total formal votes		63,079	97.6	
Informal votes		1,568	2.4	
Turnout		64,647	95.5	
Labor hold		Swing	−9.0	

==== 1974 ====
1974 Australian federal election: Fremantle
Party	Candidate	Votes	%	±%
Labor	Kim Beazley Sr.	35,932	59.4	+3.2
Liberal	Douglas Fernihough	21,711	35.9	−3.5
National Alliance	Peter Moorehouse	2,136	3.5	+0.5
Australia	Charles Pierce	723	1.2	+1.2
Total formal votes		60,502	97.5	
Informal votes		1,554	2.5	
Turnout		62,056	95.5	
Two-party-preferred result
Labor	Kim Beazley Sr.		60.6	+2.5
Liberal	Douglas Fernihough		39.4	−2.5
Labor hold		Swing	+2.5	

==== 1972 ====
1972 Australian federal election: Fremantle
Party	Candidate	Votes	%	±%
Labor	Kim Beazley Sr.	32,803	56.6	−6.7
Liberal	Erica Lawton	22,637	39.0	+6.7
Democratic Labor	Rosemary Tobori	1,764	3.0	−1.5
Communist	Jack Marks	786	1.4	+1.4
Total formal votes		57,990	97.5	
Informal votes		1,515	2.5	
Turnout		59,505	94.8	
Two-party-preferred result
Labor	Kim Beazley Sr.		58.5	−5.7
Liberal	Erica Lawton		41.5	+5.7
Labor hold		Swing	−5.7	

=== Elections in the 1960s ===
==== 1969 ====
1969 Australian federal election: Fremantle
Party	Candidate	Votes	%	±%
Labor	Kim Beazley Sr.	34,336	63.3	+6.0
Liberal	Robert French	17,520	32.3	−3.5
Democratic Labor	Frank Pownall	2,417	4.5	+0.0
Total formal votes		54,273	97.8	
Informal votes		1,206	2.2	
Turnout		55,479	95.1	
Two-party-preferred result
Labor	Kim Beazley Sr.		64.2	+4.4
Liberal	Robert French		35.8	−4.4
Labor hold		Swing	+4.4	

==== 1966 ====
1966 Australian federal election: Fremantle
Party	Candidate	Votes	%	±%
Labor	Kim Beazley Sr.	29,827	57.0	+2.1
Liberal	John Waghorne	18,909	36.1	−6.1
Democratic Labor	John Martyr	2,378	4.5	+4.5
Communist	Paddy Troy	1,248	2.4	+1.0
Total formal votes		52,362	96.1	
Informal votes		2,135	3.9	
Turnout		54,497	95.4	
Two-party-preferred result
Labor	Kim Beazley Sr.		60.1	+3.1
Liberal	John Waghorne		39.9	−3.1
Labor hold		Swing	+3.1	

==== 1963 ====
1963 Australian federal election: Fremantle
Party	Candidate	Votes	%	±%
Labor	Kim Beazley Sr.	27,203	54.9	−5.8
Liberal	John Waghorne	20,931	42.2	+5.4
Independent	James Collins	748	1.5	+1.5
Communist	Paddy Troy	676	1.4	−1.0
Total formal votes		49,558	97.9	
Informal votes		1,043	2.1	
Turnout		50,601	96.3	
Two-party-preferred result
Labor	Kim Beazley Sr.		57.0	−5.9
Liberal	John Waghorne		43.0	+5.9
Labor hold		Swing	−5.9	

==== 1961 ====
1961 Australian federal election: Fremantle
Party	Candidate	Votes	%	±%
Labor	Kim Beazley Sr.	27,615	60.7	+3.5
Liberal	John Waghorne	16,747	36.8	−3.4
Communist	Joan Williams	1,107	2.4	−0.1
Total formal votes		45,469	97.3	
Informal votes		1,268	2.7	
Turnout		46,737	95.5	
Two-party-preferred result
Labor	Kim Beazley Sr.		62.9	+3.4
Liberal	John Waghorne		37.1	−3.4
Labor hold		Swing	+3.4	

=== Elections in the 1950s ===
==== 1958 ====
1958 Australian federal election: Fremantle
Party	Candidate	Votes	%	±%
Labor	Kim Beazley Sr.	23,780	57.2	+0.1
Liberal	Peter Goode	16,725	40.2	+0.4
Communist	Paddy Troy	1,051	2.5	−0.7
Total formal votes		41,556	97.3	
Informal votes		1,134	2.7	
Turnout		42,690	95.7	
Two-party-preferred result
Labor	Kim Beazley Sr.		59.5	−0.5
Liberal	Peter Goode		40.5	+0.5
Labor hold		Swing	−0.5	

==== 1955 ====
1955 Australian federal election: Fremantle
Party	Candidate	Votes	%	±%
Labor	Kim Beazley Sr.	22,011	57.1	−0.5
Liberal	Vernon Hubbard	15,336	39.8	−0.9
Communist	Paddy Troy	1,231	3.2	+1.4
Total formal votes		38,578	97.2	
Informal votes		1,111	2.8	
Turnout		39,689	96.2	
Two-party-preferred result
Labor	Kim Beazley Sr.		60.0	+0.9
Liberal	Vernon Hubbard		40.0	−0.9
Labor hold		Swing	+0.9	

==== 1954 ====
1954 Australian federal election: Fremantle
Party	Candidate	Votes	%	±%
Labor	Kim Beazley Sr.	26,079	54.5	−2.2
Liberal	Douglas McPherson	21,002	43.9	+0.6
Communist	Paddy Troy	765	1.6	+1.6
Total formal votes		47,846	98.5	
Informal votes		722	1.5	
Turnout		48,568	97.2	
Two-party-preferred result
Labor	Kim Beazley Sr.		56.0	−0.7
Liberal	Douglas McPherson		44.0	+0.7
Labor hold		Swing	−0.7	

==== 1951 ====
1951 Australian federal election: Fremantle
Party	Candidate	Votes	%	±%
Labor	Kim Beazley Sr.	23,901	56.7	+2.0
Liberal	Len Seaton	18,273	43.3	−0.3
Total formal votes		42,174	97.8	
Informal votes		960	2.2	
Turnout		43,134	97.1	
Labor hold		Swing	+0.5	

=== Elections in the 1940s ===
==== 1949 ====
1949 Australian federal election: Fremantle
Party	Candidate	Votes	%	±%
Labor	Kim Beazley Sr.	22,463	54.7	−9.8
Liberal	Billy Snedden	17,918	43.6	+8.1
Communist	Paddy Troy	675	1.6	+1.6
Total formal votes		41,056	97.9	
Informal votes		862	2.1	
Turnout		41,918	96.4	
Two-party-preferred result
Labor	Kim Beazley Sr.		56.2	−8.3
Liberal	Billy Snedden		43.8	+8.3
Labor hold		Swing	−8.3	

==== 1946 ====
1946 Australian federal election: Fremantle
Party	Candidate	Votes	%	±%
Labor	Kim Beazley Sr.	45,383	64.1	−2.8
Liberal	Claude Henderson	25,428	35.9	+22.0
Total formal votes		70,811	97.4	
Informal votes		1,908	2.6	
Turnout		72,719	94.1	
Labor hold		Swing	−5.0	

==== 1945 by-election ====
1945 Fremantle by-election
Party	Candidate	Votes	%	±%
Labor	Kim Beazley	34,009	57.33	–9.57
Liberal	Donald Cleland	19,880	33.51	+0.41
Independent	Thomas Hughes	2,210	3.73	+3.73
Communist	Paddy Troy	1,807	3.05	+3.05
State Liberal	Carlyle Ferguson	1,273	2.15	+2.15
Atokist	Louis Phillips	143	0.24	+0.24
Total formal votes		59,322	97.10	–1.12
Informal votes		1,769	2.90	+1.12
Turnout		61,091	84.36	–14.70
Labor hold		Swing		

==== 1943 ====
1943 Australian federal election: Fremantle
Party	Candidate	Votes	%	±%
Labor	John Curtin	45,352	66.9	+18.9
Ind. Nationalist	Frederick Lee	13,046	19.2	+19.2
United Australia	Alex Bracks	9,396	13.9	−32.3
Total formal votes		67,794	98.2	
Informal votes		1,226	1.8	
Turnout		69,020	99.1	
Two-party-preferred result
Labor	John Curtin		69.3	+19.0
Ind. Nationalist	Frederick Lee		30.7	+30.7
Labor hold		Swing	+19.0	

==== 1940 ====
1940 Australian federal election: Fremantle
Party	Candidate	Votes	%	±%
Labor	John Curtin	27,299	48.0	−7.2
United Australia	Frederick Lee	26,274	46.2	+5.3
Ind. United Australia	Gil Clarke	3,344	5.9	+5.9
Total formal votes		56,917	97.4	
Informal votes		1,499	2.6	
Turnout		58,416	94.7	
Two-party-preferred result
Labor	John Curtin	28,779	50.6	−6.6
United Australia	Frederick Lee	28,138	49.4	+6.6
Labor hold		Swing	−0.5	

=== Elections in the 1930s ===
==== 1937 ====
1937 Australian federal election: Fremantle
Party	Candidate	Votes	%	±%
Labor	John Curtin	29,548	55.2	+9.5
United Australia	Eric Isaachsen	21,857	40.9	+0.5
Independent	Henry Wright	2,081	3.9	+3.9
Total formal votes		53,486	96.7	
Informal votes		1,827	3.3	
Turnout		55,313	94.7	
Two-party-preferred result
Labor	John Curtin		57.2	+4.6
United Australia	Eric Isaachsen		42.8	−4.6
Labor hold		Swing	+4.6	

==== 1934 ====
1934 Australian federal election: Fremantle
Party	Candidate	Votes	%	±%
Labor	John Curtin	22,331	45.7	+3.7
United Australia	Florence Cardell-Oliver	19,761	40.4	+9.5
Social Credit	William Buchan	6,782	13.9	+13.9
Total formal votes		48,874	97.1	
Informal votes		1,438	2.9	
Turnout		50,312	93.9	
Two-party-preferred result
Labor	John Curtin	24,951	51.1	+6.6
United Australia	Florence Cardell-Oliver	23,923	48.9	−6.6
Labor gain from United Australia		Swing	+6.6	

==== 1931 ====
1931 Australian federal election: Fremantle
Party	Candidate	Votes	%	±%
Labor	John Curtin	19,142	42.0	−15.0
Independent	William Watson	14,092	30.9	−12.1
United Australia	Keith Watson	12,365	27.1	+27.1
Total formal votes		45,599	97.9	
Informal votes		968	2.1	
Turnout		46,567	94.1	
Two-party-preferred result
Independent	William Watson	25,328	55.5	+12.5
Labor	John Curtin	20,271	44.5	−12.5
Independent gain from Labor		Swing	+12.5	

=== Elections in the 1920s ===
==== 1929 ====
1929 Australian federal election: Fremantle
Party	Candidate	Votes	%	±%
Labor	John Curtin	24,482	57.0	+7.8
Nationalist	Keith Watson	18,426	43.0	+14.2
Total formal votes		42,980	97.9	
Informal votes		914	2.1	
Turnout		43,822	91.0	
Labor hold		Swing	+4.9	

==== 1928 ====
1928 Australian federal election: Fremantle
Party	Candidate	Votes	%	±%
Labor	John Curtin	19,433	49.2	+7.3
Nationalist	Frank Gibson	11,402	28.8	+28.8
Independent	Keith Watson	8,697	22.0	+22.0
Total formal votes		39,532	96.9	
Informal votes		1,253	3.1	
Turnout		40,785	93.0	
Two-party-preferred result
Labor	John Curtin	20,589	52.1	+10.2
Nationalist	Frank Gibson	18,943	47.9	+47.9
Labor gain from Independent		Swing	+10.2	

==== 1925 ====
1925 Australian federal election: Fremantle
Party	Candidate	Votes	%	±%
Independent	William Watson	20,568	58.1	+17.5
Labor	John Curtin	14,812	41.9	+2.0
Total formal votes		35,380	97.6	
Informal votes		877	2.4	
Turnout		36,257	92.2	
Independent hold		Swing	+1.2	

==== 1922 ====
1922 Australian federal election: Fremantle
Party	Candidate	Votes	%	±%
Independent	William Watson	7,420	40.6	+40.6
Labor	John Holman	7,290	39.9	−4.4
Nationalist	William Hedges	3,550	19.4	−34.1
Total formal votes		18,260	96.1	
Informal votes		742	3.9	
Turnout		19,002	54.3	
Two-party-preferred result
Independent	William Watson	10,381	56.9	+56.9
Labor	John Holman	7,879	43.1	−0.6
Independent gain from Nationalist		Swing	+56.9	

=== Elections in the 1910s ===
==== 1919 ====
1919 Australian federal election: Fremantle
Party	Candidate	Votes	%	±%
Nationalist	Reginald Burchell	15,988	60.8	−8.1
Labor	Andrew Clementson	10,294	39.2	+8.1
Total formal votes		26,282	97.6	
Informal votes		660	2.4	
Turnout		26,942	62.0	
Nationalist hold		Swing	−8.1	

==== 1917 ====
1917 Australian federal election: Fremantle
Party	Candidate	Votes	%	±%
Nationalist	Reginald Burchell	21,773	68.9	+25.2
Labor	Jack Simons	9,849	31.1	−25.2
Total formal votes		31,622	96.8	
Informal votes		1,034	3.2	
Turnout		32,656	80.1	
Nationalist gain from Labor		Swing	+25.2	

==== 1914 ====
1914 Australian federal election: Fremantle
Party	Candidate	Votes	%	±%
Labor	Reginald Burchell	16,385	56.3	+0.5
Liberal	Thomas Briggs	12,705	43.7	−0.5
Total formal votes		29,090	96.9	
Informal votes		937	3.1	
Turnout		30,027	77.1	
Labor hold		Swing	+0.5	

==== 1913 ====
1913 Australian federal election: Fremantle
Party	Candidate	Votes	%	±%
Labor	Reginald Burchell	15,428	55.8	+11.4
Liberal	William Hedges	12,225	44.2	−11.4
Total formal votes		27,653	96.6	
Informal votes		975	3.4	
Turnout		28,628	77.8	
Labor gain from Liberal		Swing	+11.4	

==== 1910 ====
1910 Australian federal election: Fremantle
Party	Candidate	Votes	%	±%
Liberal	William Hedges	7,788	54.5	+3.6
Labour	William Carpenter	6,496	45.5	−3.6
Total formal votes		14,284	98.0	
Informal votes		291	2.0	
Turnout		14,575	66.4	
Liberal hold		Swing	+3.6	

=== Elections in the 1900s ===
==== 1906 ====
1906 Australian federal election: Fremantle
Party	Candidate	Votes	%	±%
Western Australian	William Hedges	4,798	50.9	+12.2
Labour	William Carpenter	4,629	49.1	−12.2
Total formal votes		9,427	92.9	
Informal votes		718	7.1	
Turnout		10,145	37.5	
Western Australian gain from Labour		Swing	+12.2	

==== 1903 ====
1903 Australian federal election: Fremantle
Party	Candidate	Votes	%	±%
Labour	William Carpenter	3,439	61.3	+25.1
Free Trade	Elias Solomon	2,174	38.7	−18.0
Total formal votes		5,613	93.2	
Informal votes		408	6.8	
Turnout		6,021	30.9	
Labour gain from Free Trade		Swing	+21.6	

==== 1901 ====
1901 Australian federal election: Fremantle
Party	Candidate	Votes	%	±%
Free Trade	Elias Solomon	2,870	56.7	+56.7
Labour	Tom O'Beirne	1,831	36.2	+36.2
Ind. Free Trade	Charles Jones	262	5.2	+5.2
Ind. Free Trade	William Adcock	102	2.0	+2.0
Total formal votes		5,065	97.2	
Informal votes		148	2.8	
Turnout		5,213	31.1	
Free Trade win		(new seat)		
