= Electoral results for the district of Glendalough =

Western Australian district election results

This is a list of electoral results for the Electoral district of Glendalough in Western Australian state elections.

== Members for Glendalough ==
Member	Party	Term
Carmen Lawrence	Labor	1989–1994
Michelle Roberts	Labor	1994–1996

== Election results ==
=== Elections in the 1990s ===
1994 Glendalough state by-election
Party	Candidate	Votes	%	±%
Labor	Michelle Roberts	7,846	43.4	−2.0
Liberal	Michael Saunders	6,908	40.0	−0.5
Greens	Stewart Jackson	1,199	7.0	+2.8
Independent	Patrick Cranley	1,033	6.0	+6.0
Independent	Barbara Campbell	142	0.8	−1.6
Independent	Eric Brown	134	0.8	+0.8
Independent	Raymond Conder	119	0.7	+0.7
Independent	Nicholas Murray	94	0.5	+0.5
Grey Power	Douglas Ratcliffe	66	0.4	+0.4
Republican Alliance	Eugene Hands	39	0.2	+0.2
Democratic Republican	James Connolly	39	0.2	+0.2
Total formal votes		17,259	95.6	+0.7
Informal votes		786	4.4	−0.7
Turnout		18,045	79.4	−13.6
Two-party-preferred result
Labor	Michelle Roberts	9,099	52.7	0.0
Liberal	Michael Saunders	8,160	47.3	0.0
Labor hold		Swing	0.0	

1993 Western Australian state election: Glendalough
Party	Candidate	Votes	%	±%
Labor	Carmen Lawrence	8,567	45.4	−4.2
Liberal	Michael Saunders	7,635	40.5	+0.6
Greens	Stewart Jackson	790	4.2	+4.2
Independent	Karen Zielinski	775	4.1	+4.1
Democrats	Helen Hodgson	449	2.4	+2.4
Independent	Barbara Campbell	444	2.4	+2.4
Independent	Scott Calnan	194	1.0	+1.0
Total formal votes		18,854	94.9	+4.8
Informal votes		1,021	5.1	−4.8
Turnout		19,875	93.0	+4.3
Two-party-preferred result
Labor	Carmen Lawrence	9,932	52.7	−2.1
Liberal	Michael Saunders	8,922	47.3	+2.1
Labor hold		Swing	−2.1	

=== Elections in the 1980s ===
1989 Western Australian state election: Glendalough
Party	Candidate	Votes	%	±%
Labor	Carmen Lawrence	8,852	49.6	−10.3
Liberal	Gloria Hancock	7,109	39.9	+1.8
Grey Power	Donald Gudgeon	1,006	5.6	+5.6
Independent	Clive Galletly	866	4.9	+4.9
Total formal votes		17,833	90.1	
Informal votes		1,952	9.9	
Turnout		19,785	88.7	
Two-party-preferred result
Labor	Carmen Lawrence	9,773	54.8	−6.1
Liberal	Gloria Hancock	8,060	45.2	+6.1
Labor hold		Swing	−6.1	
