= 1918 Swan by-election =

Australian federal by-election

- 26 October 1918

Division of Swan
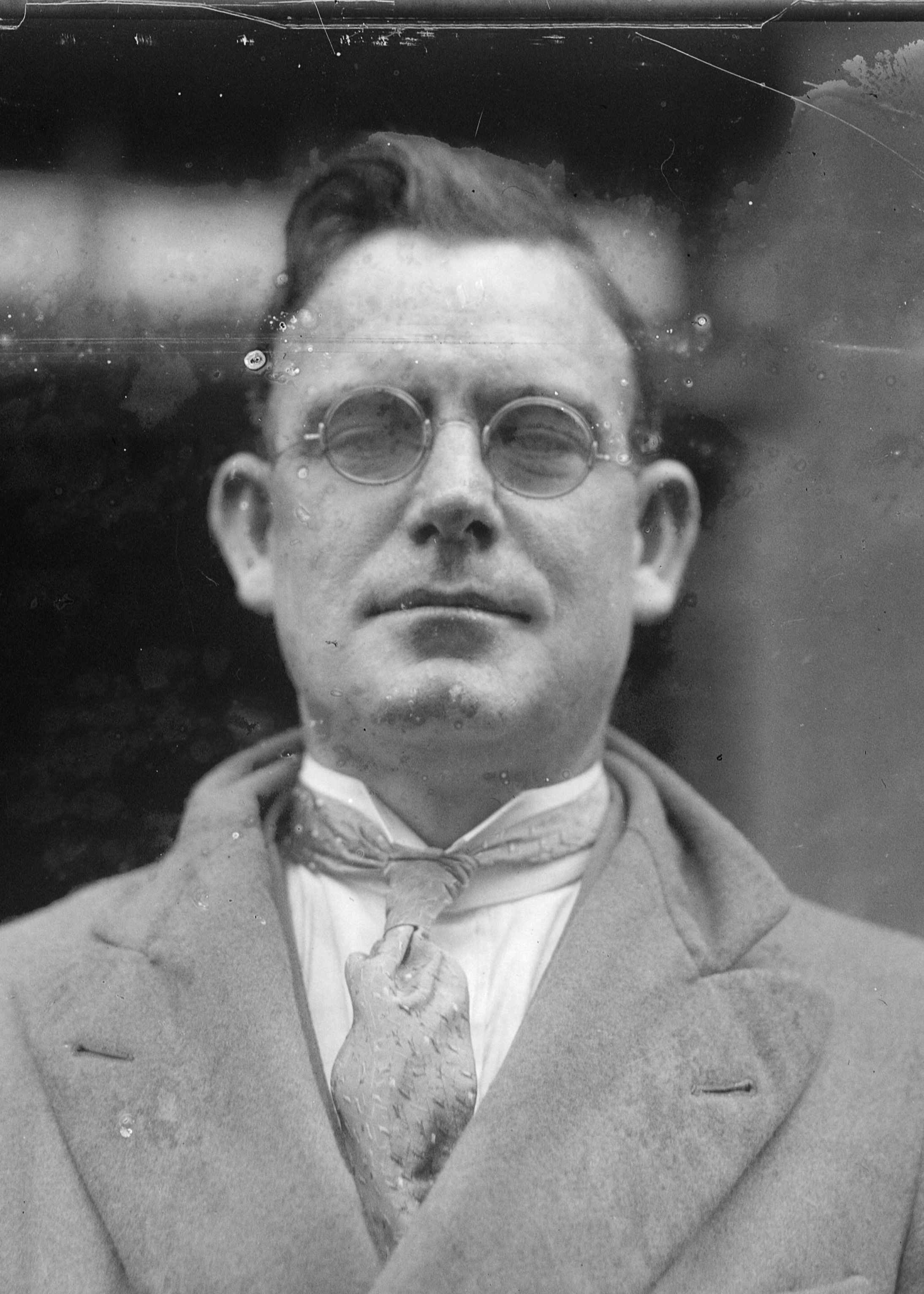

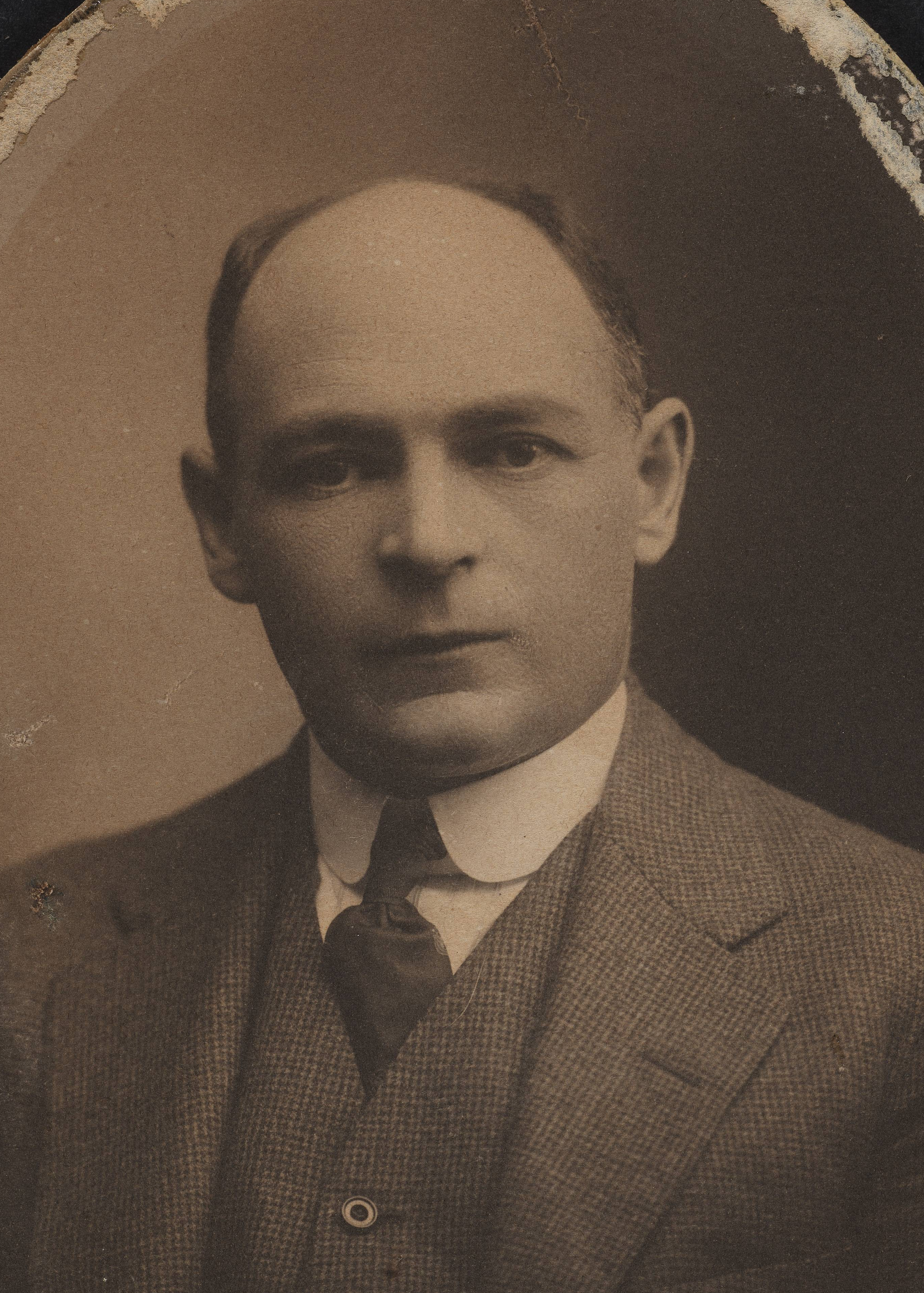

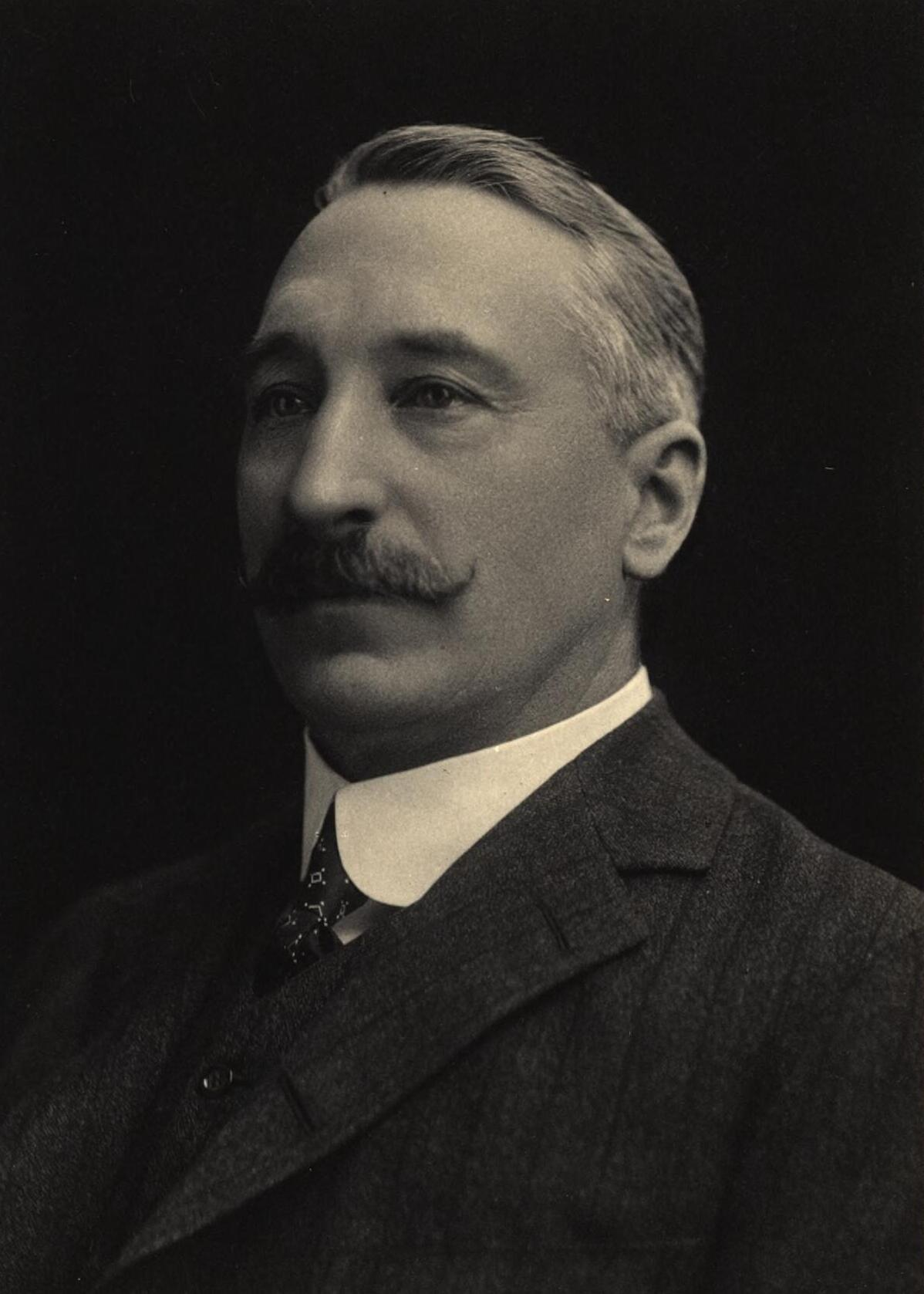
	First party	Second party	Third party
Candidate	Edwin Corboy	Basil Murray	William Hedges
Party	Labor	Country	Nationalist
Popular vote	6,540	5,975	5,635
Percentage	34.4%	31.4%	29.6%
Swing	▲34.4pp	▲31.4pp	▼70.4pp
MP before election
John Forrest
Nationalist
Elected MP
Edwin Corboy
Labor

The 1918 Swan by-election was a by-election for the Division of Swan in the Australian House of Representatives, following the death of the sitting member Sir John Forrest. Held on 26 October 1918, the by-election led to the election of the youngest person to be elected until 2010 to the Parliament of Australia, Edwin Corboy. It saw the conservative vote split between the Country Party and the Nationalist Party, which directly prompted the introduction of preferential voting in Australia.

== Background ==
Sir John Forrest, who had been the first Premier of Western Australia, was elected to the Australian House of Representatives for the Division of Swan at the first federal election on 29 March 1901. Forrest then retained this seat until 2 September 1918, when he died off the coast of Sierra Leone from cancer while en route to England. Thus, a by-election was called to replace Forrest as the representative for Swan.

=== Electoral system and political parties in Australia ===
By 1909, Australia had evolved a two-party system at the federal level, with the conservative Commonwealth Liberal Party and the progressive Australian Labor Party having both alternately won power via general election. This system was upset in November 1916, when the Labor party split over the issue of conscription; Prime Minister Billy Hughes and his pro-conscription supporters left the Labor party and formed a minority government as the "National Labor Party", before merging with the Liberals in February 1917 to form the Nationalist Party with Hughes as their leader.

However, Hughes was distrusted by some on the conservative side of politics for his past involvement in socialist politics as Labor leader, and disaffected conservative farmers were moved to support the new Country Party, which had been formed in Western Australia in 1913 (and would be formed federally in 1922 from an amalgamation of state-based parties).

At the time of the 1918 Swan by-election, Australia used a first past the post voting system, as was (and still is) used in the United Kingdom, in all elections at the federal level. Under this system, the winner was simply the candidate with the highest numerical total of votes, regardless of whether it was a majority.

== Election ==
The by-election was the first of what have come to be known in Australia as "three-cornered contests" with two anti-Labor parties both running candidates against Labor. The Nationalist candidate was William Hedges; Basil Murray was the Country Party candidate; Edwin Corboy was the Labor candidate, with William Watson standing as an independent. Hedges was previously a member of the House of Representatives for the Division of Fremantle, from 1906 to 1913. Forrest had won Swan in the previous election unopposed.

=== Results ===
In the end, the Nationalist and Country candidates split the anti-Labor vote, Hedges achieving 29.6% and Murray gathering 31.4% of the total; however, both were beaten by the Labor candidate Corboy, who received 34.4% of the total vote. Corboy was duly elected as the member for Swan.

1918 Swan by-election
Party	Candidate	Votes	%	±%
Labor	Edwin Corboy	6,540	34.4	+34.4
Country	Basil Murray	5,975	31.4	+31.4
Nationalist	William Hedges	5,635	29.6	−70.4
Independent	William Watson	884	4.6	+4.6
Turnout		19,213	64.3%	
Labor gain from Nationalist		Swing	N/A	

== Consequences ==
Corboy, who was elected just 22 years and two months old, remained the youngest person ever to be elected to either house of the Parliament of Australia until the 2010 election, when 20-year-old Wyatt Roy was elected as a member of the Liberal National Party of Queensland to the seat of Longman.

Shocked by the loss of a safe Nationalist seat to Labor, the Nationalist government was moved to initiate electoral reform and change the voting system to preferential voting (also known outside Australia as instant-runoff voting) as part of a rewrite of the electoral legislation, with the Commonwealth Electoral Act 1918. While preferential voting had already been introduced at the state level in Western Australia (1907) and Victoria (1911) and had been considered at the federal level by Sir Joseph Cook's government (1913–1914), it was only the "considerations of partisan advantage [and not] the finer points of electoral theory" that provided the impetus for the change.

Preferential voting was first put to use in the Corangamite by-election for the Victorian seat of Corangamite two months later, and Labor candidate and future Prime Minister James Scullin topped the primary vote, only to be defeated after distribution of preferences by William Gibson of the Victorian Farmers' Union. The preferential voting system remains in place and has helped to support a fairly stable three-party system, with the anti-Labor parties (presently the Liberal Party of Australia and the National Party of Australia) regularly forming coalition governments.

At the 1919 election, Corboy once again polled the highest percentage at the first count, with two conservative candidates again splitting the conservative vote, but with the introduction of preferential voting, Corboy was easily defeated by the Country Party's John Prowse on preferences.

In a twist of fate William Watson, who finished a distant fourth in this by-election with just 4.6% of the vote, would be elected to the House of Representatives for the Division of Fremantle at the 1922 election on the back of preferences from Nationalist candidate William Hedges, the same man who had also contested the by-election and had previously been the member for Fremantle.

== See also ==
- List of Australian federal by-elections
