= Electoral district of Glendalough =

Former state electoral district of Western Australia

Glendalough Western Australia—Legislative Assembly
- State: Western Australia
- Dates current: 1989–1996
- Namesake: Glendalough

The Electoral district of Glendalough was a Legislative Assembly electorate in the state of Western Australia. The district was named for the inner northern Perth suburb of Glendalough, which fell within its borders. The seat was abolished after two terms at the 1994 redistribution, taking effect from the 1996 election due to the one vote one value legislation. Most parts of the former seat presently fall within the seats of Churchlands and Perth.

Glendalough was created out of parts of Balcatta and the abolished Subiaco at the 1988 redistribution, which gave effect to electoral legislation passed the previous year which increased metropolitan representation in the 57-seat Legislative Assembly from 29 to 34. The seat was first contested in the 1989 election at which Labor candidate and former member for Subiaco, Dr Carmen Lawrence, was successful.

A year after the Labor government's defeat at the 1993 election, Lawrence was offered an opportunity to enter federal politics with the retirement of John Dawkins, who had resigned as Member for Fremantle. Lawrence resigned from the state parliament and won the Fremantle federal by-election, soon becoming Health Minister in the Keating government. Michelle Roberts, meanwhile, won the Glendalough state by-election caused by Lawrence's departure.

The seat was abolished in the 1994 redistribution, and was split between the new districts of Churchlands and Yokine. Roberts contested and won the eastern suburbs seat of Midland.

== Members for Glendalough ==
Member	Party	Term
Carmen Lawrence	Labor	1989–1994
Michelle Roberts	Labor	1994–1996

== See also ==
- Glendalough, Western Australia
- Glendalough railway station
