= 1945 Fremantle by-election =

Australian federal by-election

- 18 August 1945

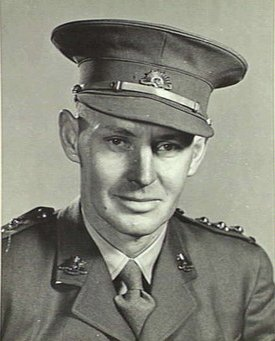
	First party	Second party
Candidate	Kim Beazley	Donald Cleland
Party	Labor	Liberal
Popular vote	34,009	19,880
Percentage	57.33%	33.51%
Swing	▼9.57pp	▲0.41pp
MP before election
John Curtin
Labor
Elected MP
Kim Beazley
Labor

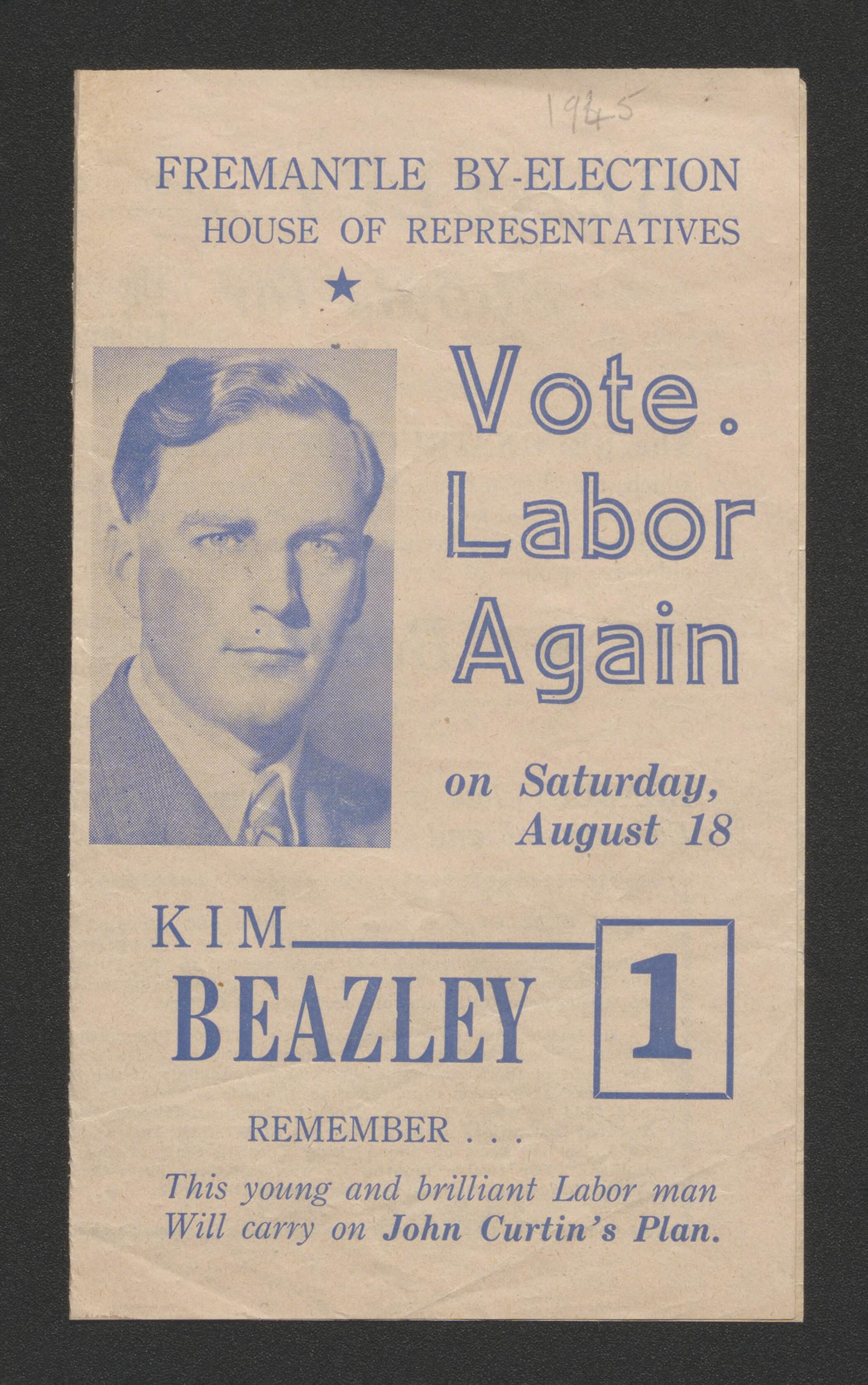
Campaign material used by Beazley

The 1945 Fremantle by-election was held in the Australian federal electorate of Fremantle in Western Australia on 18 August 1945. The by-election was triggered by the death of the sitting member, Prime Minister John Curtin, on 5 July 1945.

== Results ==
Fremantle by-election, 1945
Party	Candidate	Votes	%	±%
Labor	Kim Beazley	34,009	57.33	–9.57
Liberal	Donald Cleland	19,880	33.51	+0.41
Independent	Thomas Hughes	2,210	3.73	+3.73
Communist	Paddy Troy	1,807	3.05	+3.05
State Liberal	Carlyle Ferguson	1,273	2.15	+2.15
Atokist	Louis Phillips	143	0.24	+0.24
Total formal votes		59,322	97.10	–1.12
Informal votes		1,769	2.90	+1.12
Turnout		61,091	84.36	–14.70
Labor hold		Swing		

== See also ==
- List of Australian federal by-elections
