= 1994 Glendalough state by-election =

The 1994 Glendalough state by-election was a by-election for the seat of Glendalough in the Legislative Assembly of Western Australia held on 19 March 1994. It was triggered by the resignation of Carmen Lawrence (the sitting Labor member and a former premier) on 14 February 1994, in order to contest the House of Representatives at the 1994 Fremantle by-election. The Labor Party retained Glendalough at the by-election, with their candidate, Michelle Roberts, recording 52.7 percent of the two-party-preferred vote.

== Background ==
Carmen Lawrence had held Glendalough for the Labor Party since its creation at the 1989 state election. She had previously held Subiaco since 1986. Lawrence replaced Peter Dowding as Labor leader (and thus as premier) in February 1990, but her government was defeated at the 1993 state election. She resigned from state parliament on 14 February 1994, in order to contest the House of Representatives at the Fremantle by-election on 12 March. Following Lawrence's resignation, the writ for the by-election was issued on 17 February, with the close of nominations on 25 February. Polling day was on 19 March, with the writ returned on 30 March.

Lawrence won the Fremantle by-election held a week earlier, on 12 March, and both by-elections were contested by independent Raymond Conder.

== Results ==
Glendalough state by-election, 1994
Party	Candidate	Votes	%	±%
Labor	Michelle Roberts	7,846	43.4	–2.0
Liberal	Michael Saunders	6,908	40.0	–0.5
Greens	Stewart Jackson	1,199	6.9	+2.7
Independent	Patrick Cranley	1,033	6.0	+6.0
Independent	Barbara Campbell	142	0.8	–1.6
Independent	Eric Brown	134	0.8	+0.8
Independent	Raymond Conder	119	0.7	+0.7
Independent	Nicholas Murray	94	0.5	+0.5
Grey Power	Douglas Ratcliffe	66	0.4	+0.4
Republican	Eugene Hands	39	0.2	+0.2
Democratic Republican	James Connolly	39	0.2	+0.2
Total formal votes		17,259	95.6	+0.7
Informal votes		786	4.4	–0.7
Turnout		18,045	79.4	–13.6
Two-party-preferred result
Labor	Michelle Roberts	9,099	52.7	±0.0
Liberal	Michael Saunders	8,160	47.3	±0.0
Labor hold		Swing	±0.0	

- Connolly and Hands recorded the same number of first-preference votes, but Connolly's preferences were distributed first.

== Aftermath ==
Glendalough was abolished at the 1996 state election, and Roberts transferred to the new seat of Midland. She was a government minister between 2001 and 2008, under premiers Geoff Gallop and Alan Carpenter, and in 2015 became Western Australia's longest-serving female parliamentarian. Lawrence was successful in her attempt to transfer to the House of Representatives, and was appointed to the federal ministry almost immediately after entering parliament, where she served until the Labor government's defeat at the 1996 federal election.

== See also ==
- List of Western Australian state by-elections
- Women in the Western Australian Legislative Assembly
