= Melissa Parke =

Australian politician (born 1966)

The Honourable Melissa Parke
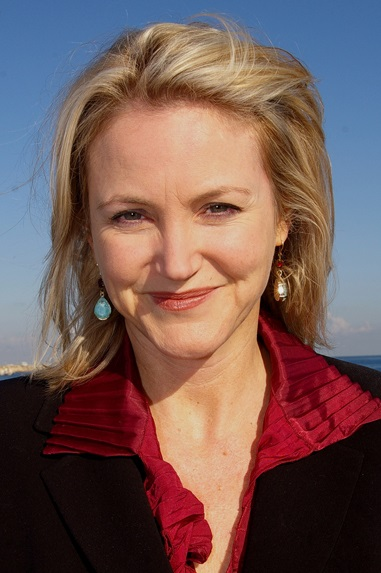
- Parke in 2010

Member of the Australian Parliament for Fremantle
- In office 24 November 2007 – 9 May 2016
- Preceded by: Carmen Lawrence
- Succeeded by: Josh Wilson

Minister for International Development
- In office 1 July 2013 – 18 September 2013
- Prime Minister: Kevin Rudd
- Preceded by: Office established
- Succeeded by: Steven Ciobo (2015)

Personal details
- Born: 11 August 1966 (age 60) Bunbury, Western Australia
- Party: Labor
- Education: Curtin University; Murdoch University; University of New South Wales
- Occupation: Lawyer
- Website: www.melissaparke.com.au

Melissa Parke (born 11 August 1966) is a former Australian Labor Party politician and UN human rights lawyer, who served as Member for the federal electoral Division of Fremantle in the Australian House of Representatives from 2007 to 2016. In 2013 Parke was appointed by Prime Minister Kevin Rudd as Minister for International Development and served in that capacity until Labor lost government later that year.

Prior to entering politics, Parke worked as a lawyer for the United Nations. Between 1999 and 2007 she worked for the UN in Kosovo, Lebanon, Gaza, and New York. She also worked as a law lecturer at Murdoch University, the principal solicitor at the Bunbury Community Legal Centre, and in private legal practice in Sydney and Western Australia.

She retired from politics at the 2016 federal election. In September 2017 Parke was appointed as an Ambassador for the International Campaign to Abolish Nuclear Weapons (ICAN). She was appointed executive director of ICAN in 2023.

In December 2017, and again in 2018, 2019, and 2020, Parke was appointed by the UN Human Rights Commissioner to the "Group of Eminent Experts on Yemen", to investigate human rights violations in Yemen.

In April 2019, she was selected by the ALP to contest the federal seat of Curtin, but stepped down from her candidacy following a media campaign against her because of her advocacy for Palestinian rights.

== Early life and education ==
Melissa Parke was born on 11 August 1966 in Bunbury, Western Australia. She grew up in the south-west of Western Australia on her parents' apple farm in Donnybrook.

She attended public schools in Donnybrook and Bunbury. She completed a Bachelor of Business (with Distinction) at Curtin University in 1989. This was followed by a law degree at the University of New South Wales and subsequently in 1998 a Master of Laws (LLM) in public international law at Murdoch University.

== Early career ==
From 1990 to 1994 Parke worked in law offices in Sydney and Bunbury and from 1994 to 1997 as solicitor-in–charge at the Bunbury Community Legal Centre. It was during this period that she unsuccessfully contested the WA Legislative Assembly seat of Mitchell for Labor at the 1996 election.

=== United Nations ===
Parke began her employment as an international lawyer with UNMIK, the United Nations peacekeeping mission in Kosovo from 1999 to 2002 and subsequently worked in Gaza with the United Nations Relief and Works Agency for Palestine Refugees in the Near East (UNRWA) from 2002 to 2004.

In 2004 Parke became a legal adviser in the Office of the Under-Secretary-General for Management in the UN headquarters, New York. In this role, Parke was responsible for aspects of management reform and for the provision of advice and oversight in respect of the UN system of justice administration.

In 2005 and 2006, Parke was seconded from the Department of Management to establish the new UN Ethics Office, laying the foundations for a permanent unit within the UN that would eventually serve 29,000 personnel worldwide in relation to issues of ethics, transparency and good governance.

From mid-2006 to early 2007, Parke worked as the deputy chief of staff and legal adviser in the UN International Independent Investigation Commission (UNIIIC) in Beirut, Lebanon, investigating the assassination of the former Lebanese prime minister Rafik Hariri and other terrorist attacks in Lebanon.

Parke returned to her post in New York in early 2007 and left the United Nations in June of that year to return to Fremantle, Australia to stand for federal parliament.

== Political career ==
Parke was first elected as the Member for the Division of Fremantle in the 2007 Australian federal election. Former Prime Minister Bob Hawke campaigned in Fremantle with Parke and the retiring MP Carmen Lawrence. She was re-elected in the 2010 Australian federal election and again in the 2013 Australian federal election. Some notable achievements include negotiating the return of Cantonment Hill from the Australian Defence Force to the City of Fremantle and organising a community cabinet forum in Fremantle in March 2011 attended by prime minister Julia Gillard and key cabinet ministers. Parke also sat sat on the Joint Standing Committee for Foreign Affairs, Defence, and Trade; the Joint Standing Committee for Treaties; and the Joint Statutory Committee: Australian Commission for Law Enforcement Integrity.

In June 2011 Parke publicly raised concerns about the government's proposal to send asylum-seeker children to Malaysia and in July 2011 Parke was one of nine backbenchers to raise concerns about the government's decision to resume the live export of cattle to Indonesia after the ABC Four Corners program exposed cruel and inhumane treatment of Australian cattle in Indonesian abattoirs.

In February 2013 Parke was promoted to Parliamentary Secretary for Mental Health, Homelessness and Social Housing. Kevin Rudd appointed Parke as Minister for International Development in his second ministry, a role she served in until Labor lost office in September 2013.

On 22 January 2016, Parke announced her retirement at the next federal election that year, to spend more time with her family, following her marriage to Perth businessman and patron of the arts, Warwick Hemsley.

In April 2019, she was selected by the Australian Labor Party to contest the federal seat of Curtin in the 2019 federal election, which had been held by former Deputy Liberal Leader Julie Bishop since 1998. Parke withdrew her candidacy for the seat following negative media coverage after she had criticised Israel's treatment of Palestinians in a meeting. She said her views regarding Palestine and Israel were well known, but that she did not want them to be a distraction.

== Other activities ==
Over the years Parke's community activities have included acting as a Western Australian representative on the National Council of the Australian Conservation Foundation, as the spokesperson for the Communities for Coastal Conservation, and serving on the management committee of the Waratah Domestic Violence and Sexual Assault Referral Centre.

In September 2017 Parke was appointed as an Ambassador for the International Campaign to Abolish Nuclear Weapons (ICAN). In October 2017 ICAN was announced as the winner of the 2017 Nobel Peace Prize for its role in achieving the Treaty on the Prohibition of Nuclear Weapons. She was appointed executive director of ICAN in 2023.

In December 2017, and again in 2018, 2019, and 2020, Parke was appointed by the UN Human Rights Commissioner to the "Group of Eminent Experts on Yemen", to investigate human rights violations in Yemen.

In 2019, Parke was elected to the governing body of international development organisation BRAC, the world's largest NGO.

In January 2020, Parke sued Liberal MP Dave Sharma for defamation over a tweet in which he accused her of antisemitism and "trafficking in conspiracy theories". She also sued Colin Rubenstein, executive director of the Australia/Israel and Jewish Affairs Council, and the West Australian and Herald Sun newspapers, over a press release from Rubenstein and stories run in those newspapers that she alleged defamed her. On 8 January 2020 The West Australian published an apology and published an article by Parke. On 26 March 2020, the Herald Sun printed an apology to Parke and published her op-ed entitled "Criticism Not Same As Racism". In October 2020, the Federal Court ruled that Parke was entitled to take up an earlier settlement offer from Dave Sharma despite initially rejecting it, and the case was consequently dismissed. In mid-April 2021, Parke withdrew her lawsuit against Rubenstein after he had released a public statement acknowledging that Parke was not an antisemite nor any of the other defamatory implications in his April 2019 press releases, and that he regretted the significant distress he had caused.

In August 2021 Parke was appointed as chair of the Western Australian Museum Board of Trustees.

== Recognition and awards ==
In 2013 Parke was a joint recipient of the Alan Missen Award for integrity, awarded by the Accountability Round Table once every three years.

Parke was awarded the Jerusalem (Al Quds) Peace Prize by the Australia Palestine Advocacy Network (APAN) in 2022, in recognition of her tireless advocacy for Palestinian human rights and justice.

Parliament of Australia
Preceded by Carmen Lawrence	Member for Fremantle; 2007–2016	Succeeded by Josh Wilson
Political offices
New ministerial post	Minister for International Development; 2013	Ministry abolished
