= Reginald Burchell =

Australian politician

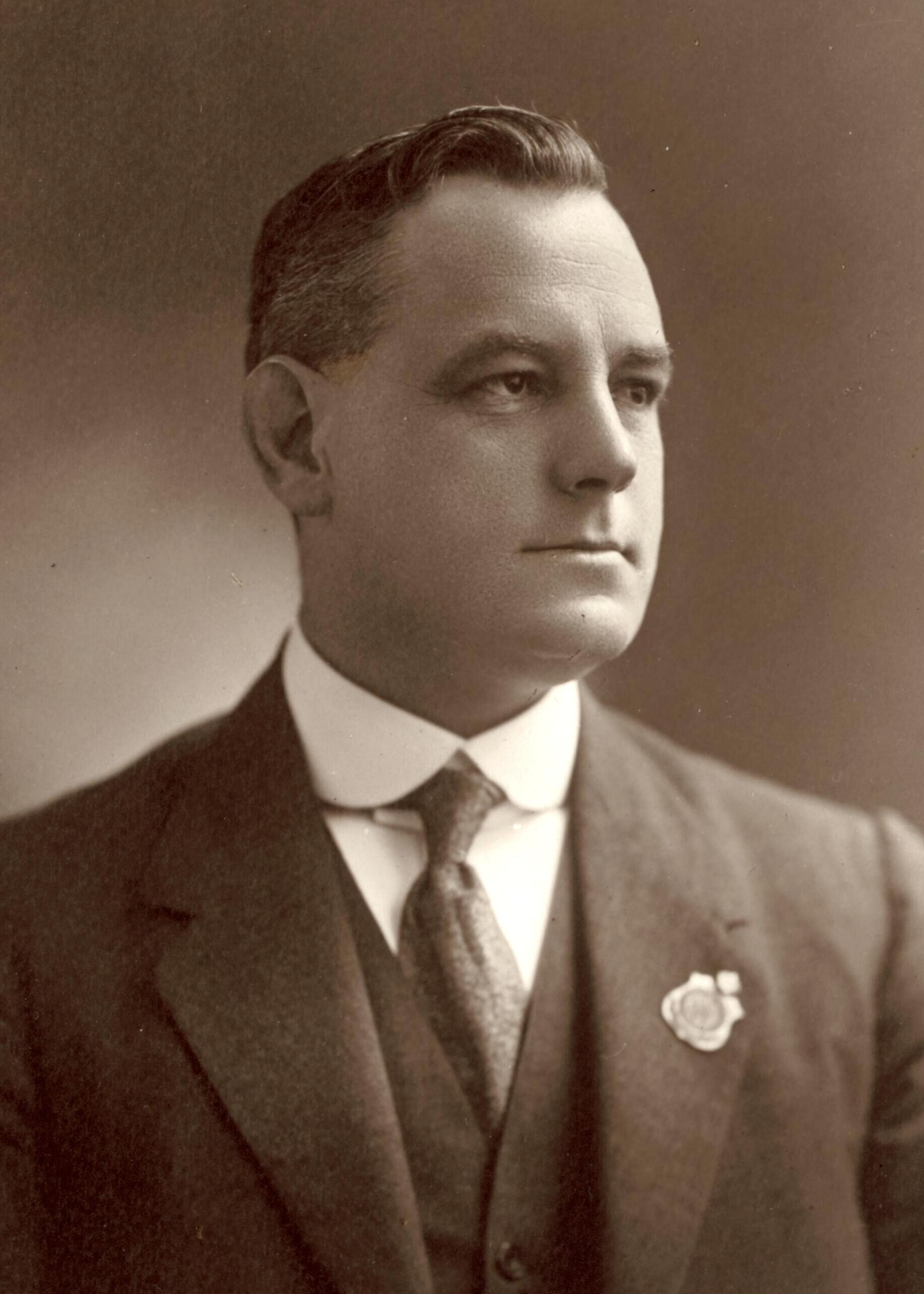

Member of the Australian Parliament for Fremantle
- In office 31 May 1913 – 6 November 1922
- Preceded by: William Hedges
- Succeeded by: William Watson

Personal details
- Born: 20 May 1883 Port Pirie, South Australia
- Died: 20 June 1955 (aged 72) Mosman, New South Wales, Australia
- Party: Nationalist (1917–1922); Labor (1913–1917)
- Occupation: Railwayman

Reginald John Burchell (20 May 1883 – 20 June 1955) was an Australian politician. He was a member of the Australian House of Representatives for the seat of Fremantle from 1913 to 1922, initially for the Australian Labor Party and after the 1916 Labor split for the Nationalist Party.

== Early life ==
Burchell was born in North Adelaide and educated in South Australia, but moved to Western Australia in 1897. He worked in the clerical division of the Western Australian Government Railways as a transport officer and became a railway trade unionist, serving as president of the West Australian Railway Officers' Association, during which time he attempted to affiliate the various railway unions. He was elected to the Cottesloe Roads Board in 1911 and served as its chairman. Burchell was narrowly defeated for the colonial seat of Claremont at the 1911 state election, during which he developed a reputation as a strong campaigner.

== Federal politics ==
In 1913, he was elected to the Australian House of Representatives as the Labor member for Fremantle, defeating the sitting Liberal member, William Hedges. He publicly campaigned for a "Yes" vote in the 1916 Australian conscription referendum, and that year joined Prime Minister Billy Hughes in leaving the Labor Party over the issue of conscription, joining Hughes' new National Labor Party. In 1917, the National Labor Party merged with the Liberal Party to form the Nationalist Party.

In January 1917, Burchell enlisted in the First Australian Imperial Force to serve in World War I and was appointed to the rank of lieutenant. He was re-elected at the 1917 election with a very large 25.2% swing, and embarked for Europe the following week. He served with the 4th Company, Australian Railway Corps, attached to the Royal Engineers, on the Western Front at Ypres, the Somme and Dunkirk, and was awarded the Military Cross for controlling railway operations during a successful evacuation at the Somme. He returned to Western Australia in April 1919.

== Later life ==
He retired in 1922 and began working for Metro-Goldwyn-Mayer, rising to become its South Australian manager in 1927. However, he soon after moved to Sydney, where he worked as advertising manager for The Sunday Times and board director of Beckett's Newspapers, then as a representative of Australian Radio Technical Services and Patents, a subsidiary of AWA. He remained occasionally involved in politics, opening the NSW state election campaign of Hughes' splinter Australian Party and serving as its organising secretary in 1930 and campaigning for a "Yes" vote in the 1933 New South Wales referendum on Legislative Council reform. Burchell died in 1955.

Parliament of Australia
Preceded by William Hedges	Member for Fremantle; 1913–1922	Succeeded by William Watson
