= William Hedges (Australian politician) =

Australian politician

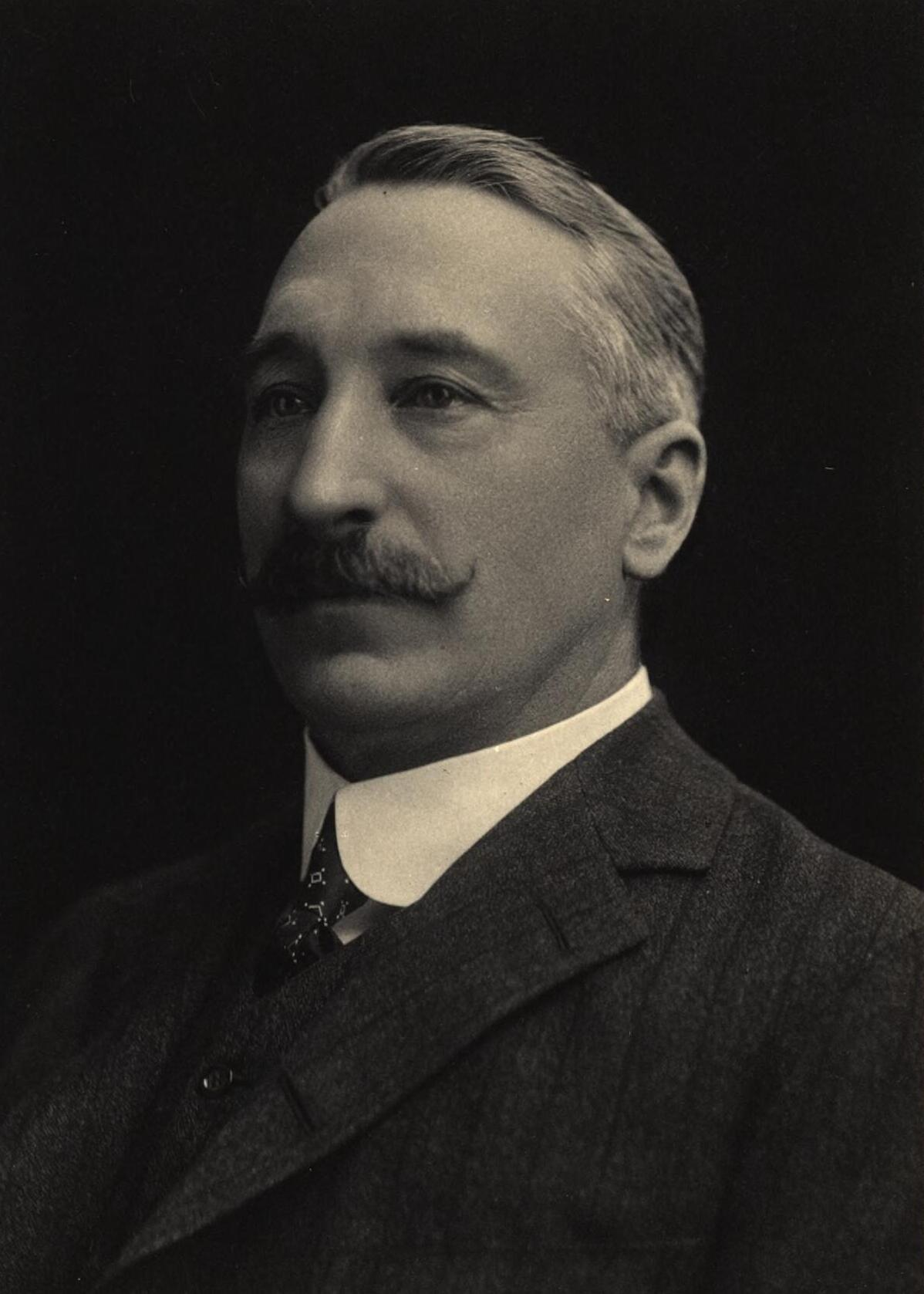

Member of the Australian Parliament for Fremantle
- In office 12 December 1906 – 31 May 1913
- Preceded by: William Carpenter
- Succeeded by: Reginald Burchell

Personal details
- Born: 16 July 1856 Boxmoor, Hertfordshire, England
- Died: 21 November 1935 (aged 79) Perth, Western Australia
- Party: Liberal (from 1909)
- Other political affiliations: Western Australian Party (1906)
- Spouse: Elizabeth Paterson (m. 1884; died 1922)
- Occupation: Contractor, company director

William Noah Hedges (16 July 1856 – 21 November 1935) was an Australian businessman and politician. He was a member of the House of Representatives from 1906 to 1913, representing the Western Australian seat of Fremantle.

== Early life ==
Hedges was born on 16 July 1856 in Boxmoor, Hertfordshire, England. He was the son of Noah Hedges, who died in 1863.

== Business activities ==
Hedges was educated in England and moved to Australia in around 1878. He lived in Queensland for a period and later moved to South Australia, where he worked at stone quarries and as a builder in Mount Barker. He secured a number of public works contracts, building wharves, railways and port facilities, and also had a farming property near Lake Alexandrina.

Hedges moved to Western Australia in 1893 during the Western Australian gold rushes, again working as a public works contractor and later becoming managing director and a major shareholder of a timber and firewood company on the Eastern Goldfields. He also established a grazing property, "Koolberrin", near Narembeen. In 1929, he was appointed President of the Western Australian Employers Federation; he remained in this position until his death in 1935.

== Politics ==
Hedges served on the Mount Barker District Council while living in South Australia. He first stood for parliament at the 1904 Western Australian state election, unsuccessfully contesting the Legislative Assembly seat of Yilgarn.

At the 1906 federal election, Hedges was elected to the House of Representatives, defeating the incumbent Australian Labor Party (ALP) MP William Carpenter in the seat of Fremantle. He was elected with the endorsement of John Forrest's Western Australian Party organisation, although during the campaign he declared himself "pledged to neither leader, party, faction, side nor caucus". Upon taking his seat in parliament he joined the opposition crossbench, to the annoyance of Forrest who continued as a minister in Alfred Deakin's Protectionist Party government.

Hedges enthusiastically joined the new Liberal Party following the "Fusion" of Protectionists and Anti-Socialists in May 1909. In a speech to parliament in July 1909, he stated that the Fusion was "the best thing that has happened since Australia federated". Hedges was re-elected as a Liberal at the 1910 election, but lost his seat to the ALP candidate Reginald Burchell in a landslide at the 1913 election.

Hedges sought re-election to parliament on three occasions after losing his seat, standing in the interests of the Nationalist Party. He was defeated in Swan at the 1918 by-election caused by John Forrest's death and also at the 1919 federal election. He then sought unsuccessfully to reclaim his former seat of Fremantle at the 1922 election.

== Personal life ==
In 1884, Hedges married Elizabeth Paterson in Wistow, South Australia, with whom he had three sons and three daughters. He was widowed in 1922 and died in Perth on 21 November 1935. His estate was valued for probate at £195,199 (equivalent to $21,000,000 in 2022).

He built Highland Valley Homestead in Burekup as a private residence.

Parliament of Australia
Preceded by William Carpenter	Member for Fremantle; 1906–1913	Succeeded by Reginald Burchell
