= Kim Beazley Sr =

Australian politician (1917–2007)

The Honourable Kim Beazley AO
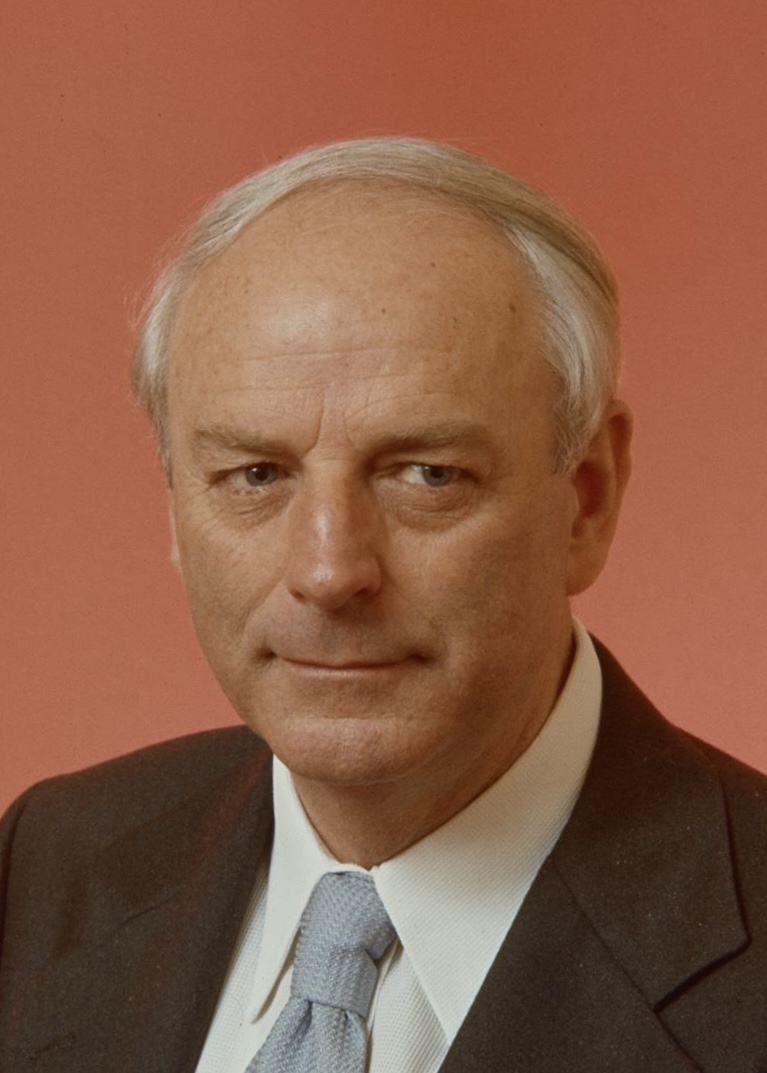
- Official portrait, 1974

Minister for Education
- In office 19 December 1972 – 11 November 1975
- Prime Minister: Gough Whitlam
- Preceded by: Gough Whitlam
- Succeeded by: Margaret Guilfoyle

Father of the House
- In office 11 November 1975 – 10 November 1977
- Preceded by: Fred Daly
- Succeeded by: Clyde Cameron

Member of the Australian Parliament for Fremantle
- In office 18 August 1945 – 10 November 1977
- Preceded by: John Curtin
- Succeeded by: John Dawkins

Personal details
- Born: Kim Edward Beazley; 30 September 1917 Northam, Western Australia
- Died: 12 October 2007 (aged 90) Claremont, Western Australia
- Party: Labor
- Spouse: Betty Judge (m. 1948)
- Children: Kim, Merrilyn, David
- Education: University of Western Australia (BA); Australian National University (MA)

Kim Edward Beazley AO (30 September 1917 – 12 October 2007) was an Australian politician who served as a member of the House of Representatives from 1945 to 1977, representing the Labor Party. He was Minister for Education in the Whitlam government from 1972 to 1975.

== Early life and education ==
Kim Edward Beazley, the youngest of seven children, was born on 30 September 1917 in Northam, Western Australia. He was the son of Alfred Beazley, a storeman and packer, and his wife Mary Wright.

Beazley grew up in Fremantle. He attended the academically selective Perth Modern School (1933–1935), where he topped the state in history and English. He went on to Claremont Teachers College, and first worked as a teacher at the Richmond State School in East Fremantle, and then Arthur River, Midland Junction, and Claremont. Beazley later studied politics at the University of Western Australia (UWA), and tutored in Modern History and Modern Political Institutions at Claremont Teachers College and at UWA. He was a demonstrating assistant and taught the seventh professional class at Claremont Central School, a lecturer in history and economic geography at Claremont's Teachers' Training College and a regular Adult Education board lecturer on international affairs. While at UWA, he was a member of its Labour Club, which was affiliated with the Australian Labor Party. Beazley was later to gain an MA from the Australian National University.

== Career ==
Kim Beazley c. 1949

Beazley joined the Claremont-Nedlands branch of the Australian Labor Party. He was active in the Party, and the elegance of his writings and the eloquence of his speeches marked him out as a rising star. He served as vice president of the State School Teachers' Union, as a member of the State Executive of the Party and as a delegate to the Metropolitan Council of the ALP.

=== In Parliament ===
On the death in office of Prime Minister John Curtin in 1945, the 27-year-old Beazley was preselected for, and won, Curtin's Federal Parliament seat of Fremantle, supported by Norman Makin and Frank Wise, in a by-election. He was the youngest member of the federal parliament when elected, and was known as "the student prince". He spent 32 years in Parliament, holding his seat until he retired in 1977.

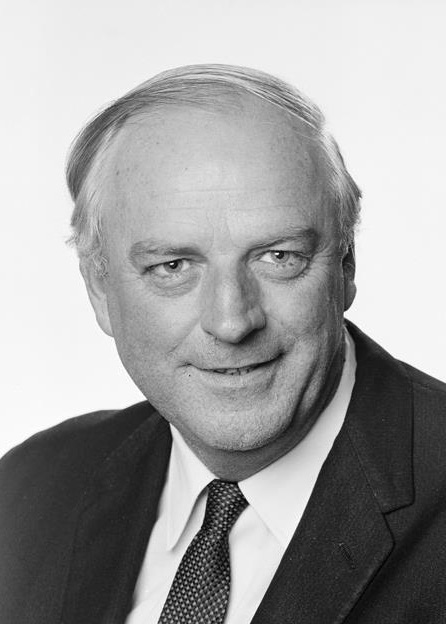
Beazley in 1971

A committed Christian (he was brought up and baptised in the Churches of Christ), and member of Moral Re-Armament (MRA), Beazley was prominent on the right wing of the Labor Party during the ideological battles of the 1950s and 1960s. He claimed a central role in the events leading to the Labor Party's fateful 1954 split and harboured lifelong regret that he failed to help avert the split when he felt it had been in his power to do so. His connection with MRA caused some to doubt his ability to stay in politics, after he declared his decision "to concern myself daily with the challenge of how to live out God's will and to turn the searchlight of absolute honesty on to my motives" in 1953.

During the leadership of Arthur Calwell (from 1960 to 1967) he was considered a possible future leader of the party, but his support for the U.S. Alliance cost him some support, and Gough Whitlam emerged as Calwell's successor.

In 1963 he became an advocate for the Yolngu people of Yirrkala mission in Arnhem Land, Northern Territory, in their fight to be consulted about the use of their land for mining bauxite. After a visit to the mission with Victorian Labor MP Gordon Bryant in July 1963 sponsored by the Federal Council for Aboriginal Advancement, Beazley came up with the idea of petitioning the federal government about the mining company's claims on their land. This led to the creation of the Yirrkala bark petitions by residents of the mission, which were presented to the Australian Parliament in August 1963. As a result, a government committee was created to look into the Yolngus' grievances. Although the mining ultimately went ahead, the petitions marked an important step in the progress towards the recognition of native title in Australia.

In 1971, Beazley took Galarrwuy Yunupingu and Wulanybuma Wununggumurra (the latter a signatory to the Yirrkala bark petitions), to the Moral Re-Armament conference in Caux, Switzerland, Switzerland. He continued to champion the cause of MRA until his death.

Beazley was the education minister in the Whitlam government from 1972 to 1975. Though afflicted with severe illness for part of his tenure, he carried out important reforms in the education field, such as abolishing university fees, introducing needs-based funding for all schools through the Schools Commission and multiplying thirteenfold Commonwealth expenditure on handicapped education. He became the Father of the House. After the defeat of the Whitlam government in 1975, Beazley was elected to the Labor front bench, but resigned in March 1976 when it was revealed that Gough Whitlam and Bill Hartley, with the ALP national secretary, David Combe, had been seeking money from the Iraqi Ba'ath Party to pay for the party's election campaign.

He retired from politics in 1977, stating that he felt the "intense pressure and the demands of parliamentary life are best endured by younger men and women." He claimed that the Labour movement's role was "healing the hurts and hates of mankind" and that he hoped to live out the rest of his life "writing, speaking and working for these ends, but without the stress of parliamentary life". He would attribute his retirement to both health reasons and the financial stress from having to campaign in four elections in five years, as sitting members were expected to fund their own campaigns due to lack of WA Labor funds.

=== Party roles ===
In 1951, Beazley wrote the preamble to the national platform and constitution of the Labor Party, at their conference in Adelaide.

He served on the ALP national executive as well as the state executive in Western Australia, and was senior vice-president of the party from 1969 until 1971.

== Life after politics ==
On Australia Day 1979, Beazley became an Officer in the General Division of the Order of Australia (A.O.). With the election of the Burke Labor government in the 1983 Western Australian state election, Beazley headed a year-long report on education in Western Australia, which was completed in 1984. The report would become the foundation for much of the basis of the future of West Australian education.

== Death and legacy ==
At the time of Beazley's death he was the last parliamentary survivor of the Chifley government, as well as the earliest surviving member of the Commonwealth Parliament. He died in Perth on 12 October 2007, and was accorded a state funeral on 20 October.

He was credited with having made a great contribution to Aboriginal people's welfare and rights, and assisted with the transition to independence of Papua New Guinea.

His memoirs were published posthumously in February 2009, with a foreword by his son Kim Christian Beazley.

The Beazley Medal, annual awards to the top secondary students in WA, were named in his honour.

== Personal life ==
Beazley married Betty Judge, a fellow teacher, union official, and an athlete (she was Australian women's 880 yards champion), on 7 February 1948, at Claremont. They had two sons, including Rhodes Scholar, Deputy Prime Minister and Governor of Western Australia Kim Christian Beazley, and one daughter.

== See also ==
- Political families of Australia

Political offices
Preceded by Gough Whitlam	Minister for Education; 1972–1975	Succeeded by Margaret Guilfoyle
Parliament of Australia
Preceded by John Curtin	Member for Fremantle; 1945–1977	Succeeded by John Dawkins
Honorary titles
Preceded by Fred Daly	Father of the House of Representatives; 1975–1977	Succeeded by Clyde Cameron/ Sir William McMahon
