= Paddy Troy =

Australian trade unionist

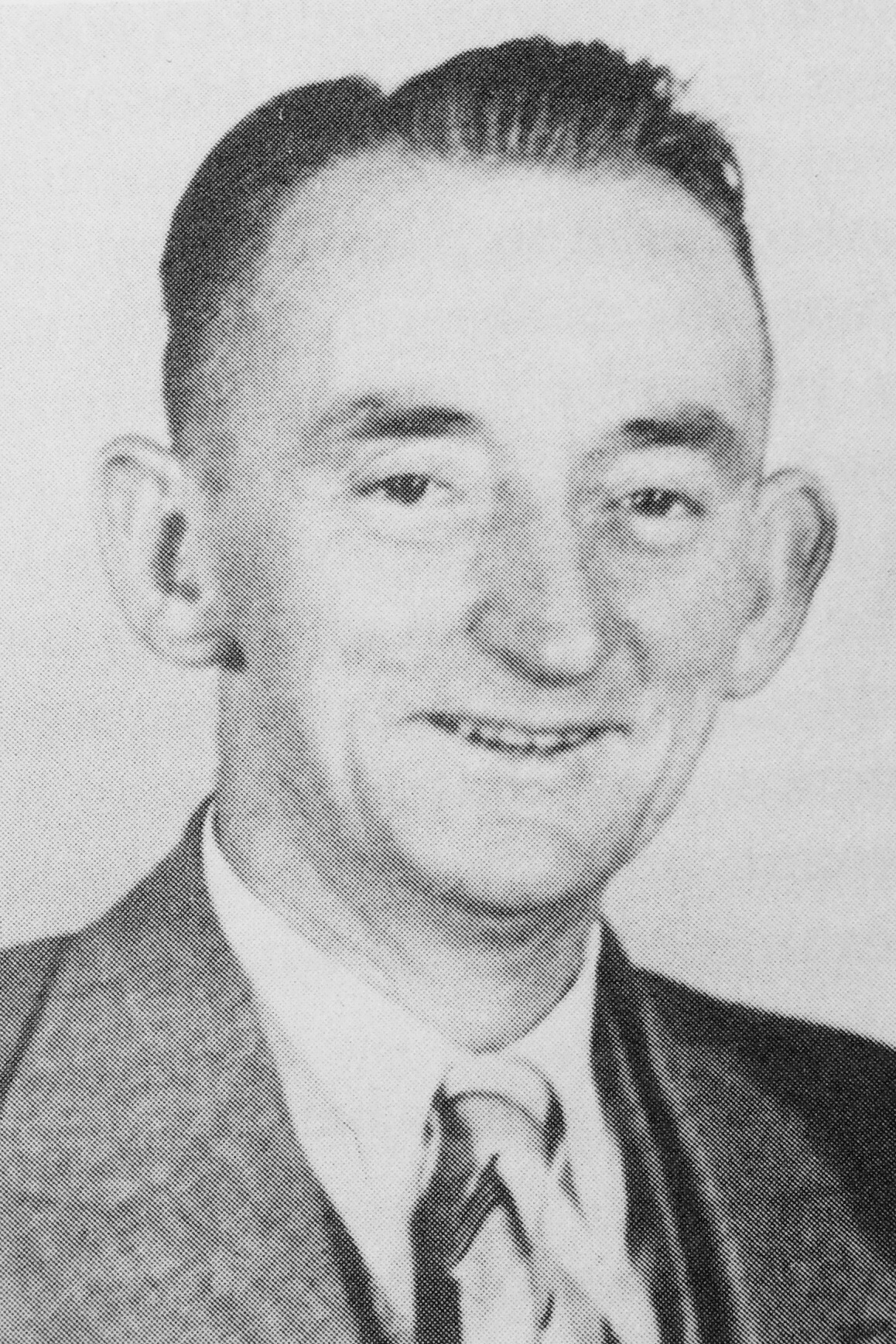
- Born: 17 January 1908; South Melbourne, Australia
- Died: April 19, 1978 (aged 70); Perth, Australia
- Occupations: Trade unionist, communist activist

Patrick Laurence Troy (17 January 1908 – 19 April 1978) was an Australian trade unionist and communist activist.

== Life ==
Troy was born in South Melbourne to Irish marine officer Patrick William Troy and Hilda Winifred, née Ainsworth. The Troys moved to Fremantle, Western Australia, during World War I, and Paddy attended the local Christian Brothers' College. He left school in 1921 to work in various kinds of manual labour until he became a seaman in the State Shipping Service in 1924. The family moved to Geraldton in 1926, where Troy began to take responsibility for the family's welfare as his father's health declined.

The Great Depression was a challenging time for Troy, who spent long periods unemployed with only casual work to support his family. He broke with the Catholic Church and the Australian Labor Party, and joined the Communist Party of Australia in 1934. In 1936 he led a strike at the Youanmi gold mine where he worked. He married Mabel Grace Nielsen at St John's Church of England in Fremantle in 1935.

Troy was jailed for three months after the banning of the Communist Party in 1940, after which he returned to the marine industry. He was elected an official of the Coastal Dock, Rivers and Harbour Works Union of Workers in 1944, and became secretary in 1948. The union was deregistered by the Court of Arbitration in 1952, and Troy began rebuilding the Maritime Services Union, becoming its secretary. In 1955 he helped establish the WA branch of the Federated Miscellaneous Workers' Union, but was thwarted in his attempts to amalgamate the various state maritime unions. He was a founder of the Western Australian Trades and Labor Council in 1963.

Troy was a strong supporter of Aboriginal emancipation, and ran on many occasions for the federal and state parliaments. During his period of activity he was Western Australia's most prominent communist; despite this, he enjoyed the respect of employers and the trust of his union. He retired in 1973. Following his wife's death in 1975, he remarried on 5 December 1976 at Attadale, to Evelyn May Henderson, a widow. He died in 1978 at Royal Perth Hospital and was cremated. He had a pilot boat named after him, and the Perth branch of the Australian Society for the Study of Labour History has an essay competition in his honour.
