= William Watson (Australian politician) =

Australian politician

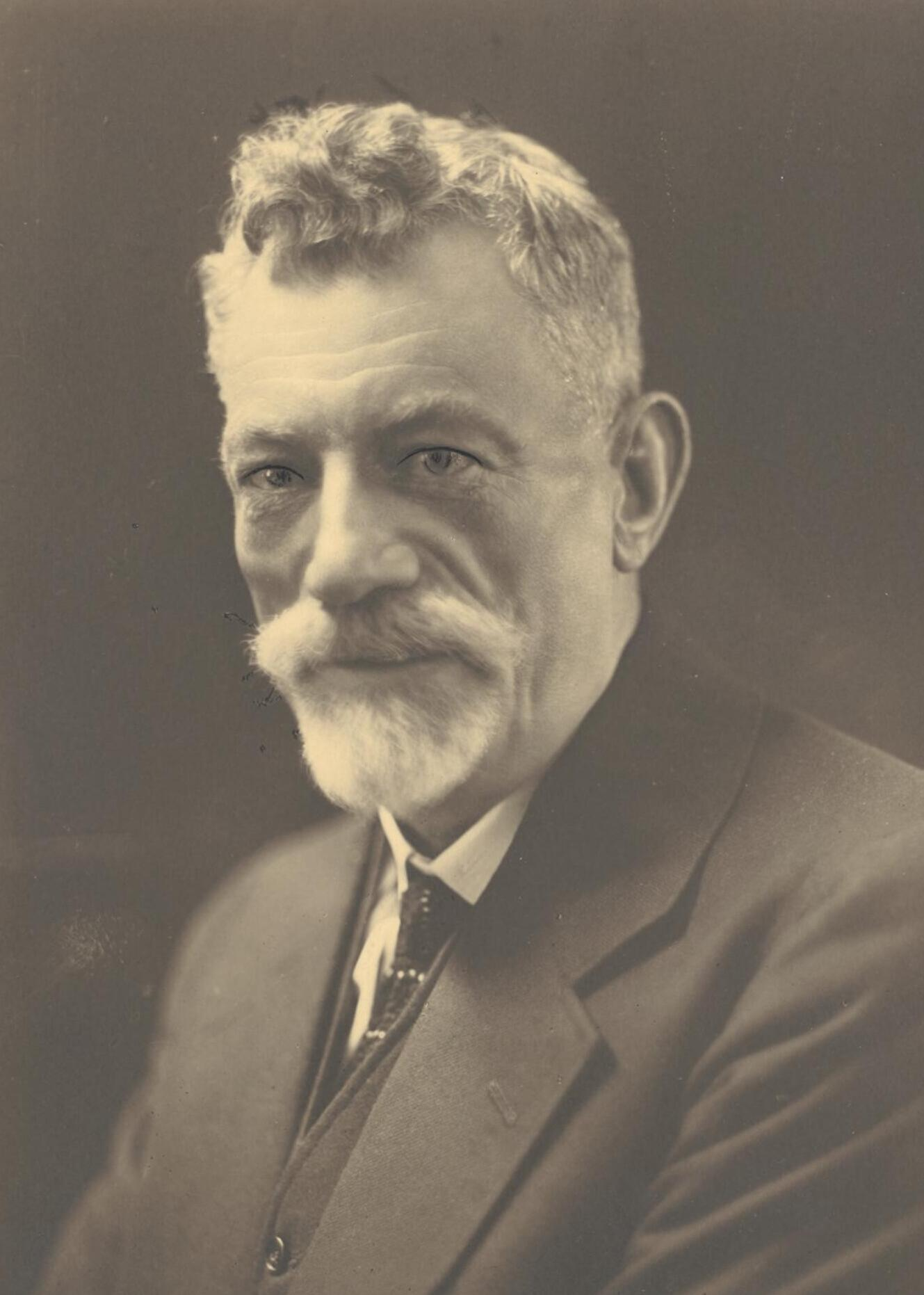

Member of the Australian Parliament for Fremantle
- In office 16 December 1922 – 9 October 1928
- Preceded by: Reginald Burchell
- Succeeded by: John Curtin
- In office 19 December 1931 – 7 August 1934
- Preceded by: John Curtin
- Succeeded by: John Curtin

Personal details
- Born: 22 October 1864 Campbells Creek, Victoria
- Died: 21 December 1938 (aged 74) Peppermint Grove, Western Australia, Australia
- Party: Independent (1922–28); UAP (1931–34)
- Occupation: Various

William Watson (22 October 1864 – 21 December 1938) was an Australian businessman and politician. He was a member of the Australian House of Representatives for the seat of Fremantle as an independent from 1922 to 1928 and as a member of the United Australia Party from 1931 to 1934.

== Early life ==
Watson was born on 21 October 1863 in Campbells Creek, Victoria. He was the son of Matilda (née Spiers) and William Watson. His mother was born in England and his father, a miner, in Scotland.

Watson attended the public school in Guildford until the age of thirteen. He worked in various occupations included farm labourer, axeman, miner, navvy, bricklayer, dairyman and commercial traveller, eventually starting his own grocery store in Melbourne in 1889.

== Business career ==
In 1895, he moved to Western Australia and settled in Fremantle, where he opened the Watson Supply Stores. Watson's business began with a grocery store and tea room in Fremantle and another store in Perth, but expanded over decades to include a bacon factory and abattoir at Spearwood, butter and dairy factories and a large international export operation in bacon and ham under the brand name Watsonia. He also became known as a generous local benefactor, particularly towards returned soldiers after two of his sons were killed in World War I; he made a large donation towards the construction of the Fremantle War Memorial and was made an honorary member of the Fremantle branch of the Returned and Services League.

== Politics ==
In 1922, he was elected to the Australian House of Representatives as an independent representing the seat of Fremantle. Watson was an outspoken opponent of the party system throughout his career, believing that it "prevented men giving their best service to the country and it made them decidedly dishonest, although they would rather it not be so". Despite this, he usually voted with the conservative parties in the House. He held the seat until he retired in 1928, citing his frustration with the political system and his inability to "mitigate the sectional division in parliament". He was re-elected to the House in 1931 - defeating John Curtin - citing his concern about the governmental response to the Great Depression for his decision to return to politics. Initially elected as an independent, he joined the governing UAP soon after the election. However, he retired for a final time in 1934, stating that he had decided not to seek re-election unless it was proved to him that it "would be of some definite advantage to the people" if he were to be returned and this had not occurred.

== Personal life ==
Watson married Eliza Annie Showell on 2 April 1888 at Campbells Creek. They had ten children, with two sons dying in World War I and two daughters also predeceasing them.

Watson retired from the business in July 1937 and sold it to his three sons. He died at his home in Peppermint Grove in December 1938 and was buried in the Methodist section of Fremantle Cemetery.

Watson did not live to see Curtin become Prime Minister in 1941. Curtin was a pallbearer at Watson's funeral, describing him as a "generous and friendly opponent".

Parliament of Australia
Preceded by Reginald Burchell	Member for Fremantle; 1922 – 1928	Succeeded by John Curtin
Preceded by John Curtin	Member for Fremantle; 1931 – 1934	Succeeded by John Curtin
