= Division of Fremantle =

Australian federal electoral division

Coordinates: 32.103°S 115.790°E

Fremantle Australian House of Representatives Division
- Interactive map of electorate boundaries from the 2025 federal election
- Created: 1901
- MP: Josh Wilson
- Party: Labor
- Namesake: Fremantle
- Electors: 116,905 (2022)
- Area: 196 km^{2} (75.7 sq mi)
- Demographic: Inner metropolitan
Electorates around Fremantle:
Curtin	Tangney	Tangney
Indian Ocean	Fremantle	Burt
Indian Ocean	Brand	Burt

The Division of Fremantle is an Australian electoral division in the state of Western Australia. It is centred on and named after the city of Fremantle, also including Rottnest Island in the Indian Ocean. Since 2016 its MP has been Josh Wilson of the Labor Party.

== Geography ==
Since 1984, federal electoral division boundaries in Australia have been determined at redistributions by a redistribution committee appointed by the Australian Electoral Commission. Redistributions occur for the boundaries of divisions in a particular state, and they occur every seven years, or sooner if a state's representation entitlement changes or when divisions of a state are malapportioned.

== History ==
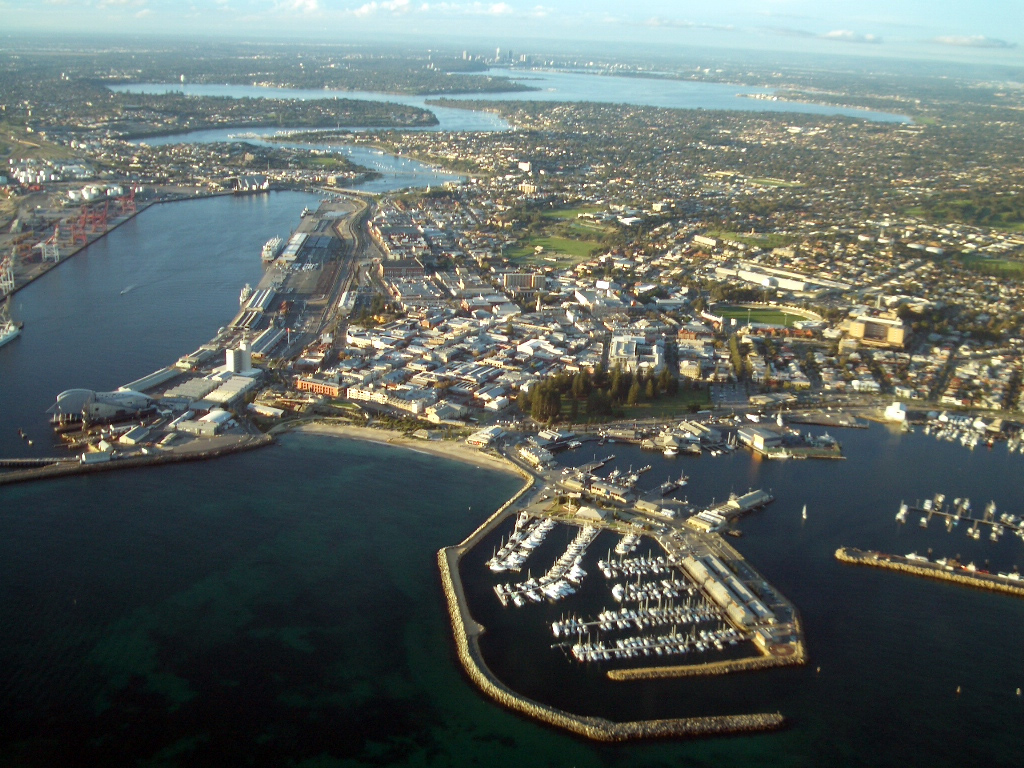
The city of Fremantle, the division's namesake

The division was created at Federation in 1900 and was one of the original 65 divisions contested at the first federal election. It is named for the city of Fremantle, which in turn is named for Captain Charles Fremantle, captain of HMS Challenger, who took formal possession of the west coast of New Holland in the name of His Majesty the King. This action cleared the way for the arrival of Captain James Stirling and the first party of Swan River Colony settlers a few weeks later.

As originally drawn, the Division of Fremantle included nearly all of Perth's south-of-the-river suburbs, plus the western suburbs south from Mt Claremont and Nedlands. On these boundaries, the seat frequently changed hands between the Australian Labor Party and the conservative parties for the first three decades of its existence. However, Labor has held the seat without interruption since 1934, and for all but one term since 1928.

For the first half-century after Federation, Perth and Fremantle were the only seats based on the capital. The 1949 expansion of Parliament shifted most of Fremantle's northern portion to the newly created Division of Curtin. Since then, it has usually been one of the safest Labor seats in Australia. It was nearly lost in the landslides of 1975 and 1977, but since the 1980 redistribution when the suburbs of Mosman Park, Peppermint Grove and Cottesloe were transferred to the Division of Curtin, the Liberals have only twice garnered 45 percent of the two-party vote, in 1996 and 2013.

Since 1934, Fremantle has been held by a succession of senior Labor figures. The seat's best-known member was John Curtin, who held it for all but one term from 1928 to 1945 and was Prime Minister from 1941 to 1945. Other high-profile members were Kim Beazley Sr., a minister in the Whitlam government; John Dawkins, a minister in the Hawke and Keating governments; and Carmen Lawrence, who served as Premier of Western Australia from 1990 to 1993 and who subsequently served as a minister in the Keating government. Lawrence retired at the 2007 election. She was succeeded by Melissa Parke, a former United Nations lawyer and a minister in the second Rudd government.

In the 2021 redistribution, the electoral boundaries of Fremantle were left unchanged. Consequently, the 2016 boundaries continued to apply as of the 2022 election.

In the 2025 election, the seat was contested by the member at the time 'Josh Wilson' and community-independent candidate 'Kate Hulett' coming off from a successful campaign for the state seat of Fremantle, which she narrowly lost.

After around a week of counting the votes, Josh Wilson narrowly won the seat again and sat in the 2025 Federal Parliament. But Kate Hulett has said that this campaign of hers was also successful, and that now Fremantle will never be taken for granted.

== Location ==
The Division is located in the southern suburbs of Perth. As at the 2022 election, it includes the following suburbs:

=== City of Cockburn ===
- Atwell
- Aubin Grove
- Banjup
- Beeliar
- Bibra Lake
- Cockburn Central
- Coogee
- Coolbellup
- Hamilton Hill
- Hammond Park
- Henderson
- Jandakot
- Lake Coogee
- Munster
- North Coogee
- North Lake
- Rottnest Island
- South Lake
- Spearwood
- Success
- Treeby
- Wattleup
- Yangebup

=== Town of East Fremantle ===
- East Fremantle

=== City of Fremantle ===
- Beaconsfield
- Fremantle
- Hilton
- North Fremantle
- O'Connor
- Samson
- South Fremantle
- White Gum Valley

=== City of Melville ===
- Palmyra
- Kardinya (part)
- Leeming (part)

== Members ==
Image	Member	Party	Term	Notes
	Elias Solomon (1839–1909)	Free Trade	29 March 1901 – 16 December 1903	Previously held the Western Australian Legislative Assembly seat of South Fremantle. Lost seat
	William Carpenter (1863–1930)	Labour	16 December 1903 – 12 December 1906	Previously held the South Australian Legislative Assembly seat of Encounter Bay. Lost seat. Later elected to the Western Australian Legislative Assembly seat of Fremantle in 1911
	William Hedges (1856–1935)	Anti-Socialist	12 December 1906 – 26 May 1909	Lost seat
	William Hedges (1856–1935)	Liberal	26 May 1909 – 31 May 1913	Lost seat
	Reginald Burchell (1883–1955)	Labor	31 May 1913 – 14 November 1916	Served as Chief Government Whip in the House under Hughes. Retired
	Reginald Burchell (1883–1955)	National Labor	14 November 1916 – 17 February 1917	Served as Chief Government Whip in the House under Hughes. Retired
	Reginald Burchell (1883–1955)	Nationalist	17 February 1917 – 6 November 1922	Served as Chief Government Whip in the House under Hughes. Retired
	William Watson (1864–1938)	Independent	16 December 1922 – 9 October 1928	Retired
	John Curtin (1885–1945)	Labor	17 November 1928 – 19 December 1931	Lost seat
	William Watson (1864–1938)	United Australia	19 December 1931 – 7 August 1934	Retired
	John Curtin (1885–1945)	Labor	15 September 1934 – 5 July 1945	Served as Opposition Leader from 1935 to 1941. Served as Prime Minister from 1941 to 1945. Died in office
	Kim Beazley (1917–2007)	Labor	18 August 1945 – 10 November 1977	Served as minister under Whitlam. Retired
	John Dawkins (1947–)	Labor	10 December 1977 – 4 February 1994	Previously held the Division of Tangney. Served as minister under Hawke and Keating. Resigned to retire from politics
	Carmen Lawrence (1948–)	Labor	12 March 1994 – 17 October 2007	Previously held the Western Australian Legislative Assembly seat of Glendalough. Served as Premier of Western Australia from 1990 to 1993. Served as minister under Keating. Retired
	Melissa Parke (1966–)	Labor	24 November 2007 – 9 May 2016	Served as minister under Rudd. Retired
	Josh Wilson (1972–)	Labor	2 July 2016 – 10 May 2018	Election results declared void due to dual citizenship. Subsequently re-elected. Incumbent
	Josh Wilson (1972–)	Labor	28 July 2018 – present	Election results declared void due to dual citizenship. Subsequently re-elected. Incumbent

== Election results ==
2025 Australian federal election: Fremantle
Party	Candidate	Votes	%	±%
Labor	Josh Wilson	39,427	38.60	−5.46
Independent	Kate Hulett	23,500	23.01	+23.01
Liberal	Tait Marston	19,254	18.85	−5.30
Greens	Amy Warne	11,802	11.56	−6.47
One Nation	Hannah Marriner	6,245	6.11	+2.94
Socialist Alliance	Joshua Last	970	0.95	−0.27
Citizens	John Bird	932	0.91	+0.91
Total formal votes		102,130	96.45	+2.26
Informal votes		3,764	3.55	−2.26
Turnout		105,894	89.49	+3.84
Notional two-party-preferred count
Labor	Josh Wilson	70,145	68.68	+1.75
Liberal	Tait Marston	31,985	31.32	−1.75
Two-candidate-preferred result
Labor	Josh Wilson	51,765	50.69	−16.24
Independent	Kate Hulett	50,365	49.31	+49.31
Labor hold				
