= 1994 Fremantle by-election =

- 12 March 1994
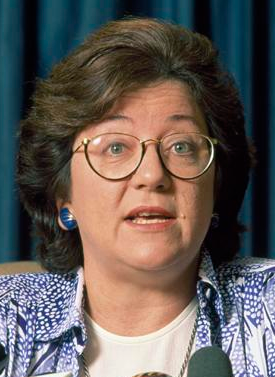

	First party	Second party
Candidate	Carmen Lawrence	Geoff Hourn
Party	Labor	Liberal
Popular vote	32,707	23,047
Percentage	52.35%	36.89%
Swing	▲2.15pp	▼1.85pp
TPP	58.83%	42.21%
TPP swing	▲1.04pp	▼1.04pp
MP before election
John Dawkins
Labor
Elected MP
Carmen Lawrence
Labor

The 1994 Fremantle by-election was held in the Australian federal electorate of Fremantle in Western Australia on 12 March 1994. The by-election was triggered by the retirement of the sitting member, the Australian Labor Party's John Dawkins, on 4 February 1994. The writ for the by-election was issued on the same day.

== Background ==
John Dawkins had held Fremantle for the Labor Party since 1977, and he had been a minister in the Hawke and Keating governments, and had been Treasurer since December 1991. When the Cabinet rebelled against the budget he brought down in August 1993, Dawkins resigned from the Treasury and, after giving occasional signals of his rising disillusionment with political life, resigned from Parliament altogether.

The Labor party preselected former state Premier Dr Carmen Lawrence, who despite her party's defeat in the 1993 state election still maintained persistently high ratings in opinion polls, while the Liberal party preselected prominent businessman Geoff Hourn.

The campaign took place in the context of tensions within the Liberal party over the leadership of Dr John Hewson, and parliamentary conflict over the sports rorts affair which had engulfed a Labor minister Ros Kelly, and a tussle between the Senate and the Labor government over documents relating to media ownership changes.

Lawrence resigned from her state seat of Glendalough in order to contest Fremantle.

The Glendalough by-election was held a week later on March 19 and both by-elections were contested by independent Raymond Conder.

== Results ==
Fremantle by-election, 1994
Party	Candidate	Votes	%	±%
Labor	Carmen Lawrence	32,707	52.35	+2.15
Liberal	Geoff Hourn	23,047	36.89	−1.85
Greens	Stephen Walker	5,215	8.35	+1.59
Independent	Raymond Conder	1,506	2.41	+2.41
Total formal votes		62,475	97.40	+0.37
Informal votes		1,669	2.60	−0.37
Turnout		64,144	85.84	−10.26
Two-party-preferred result
Labor	Carmen Lawrence	36,745	58.83	+1.04
Liberal	Geoff Hourn	25,715	42.21	−1.04
Labor hold		Swing	+1.04	

== See also ==
- List of Australian federal by-elections
