= 1914 Australian Senate election =

- 5 September 1914

All 36 seats in the Senate 18 seats needed for a majority
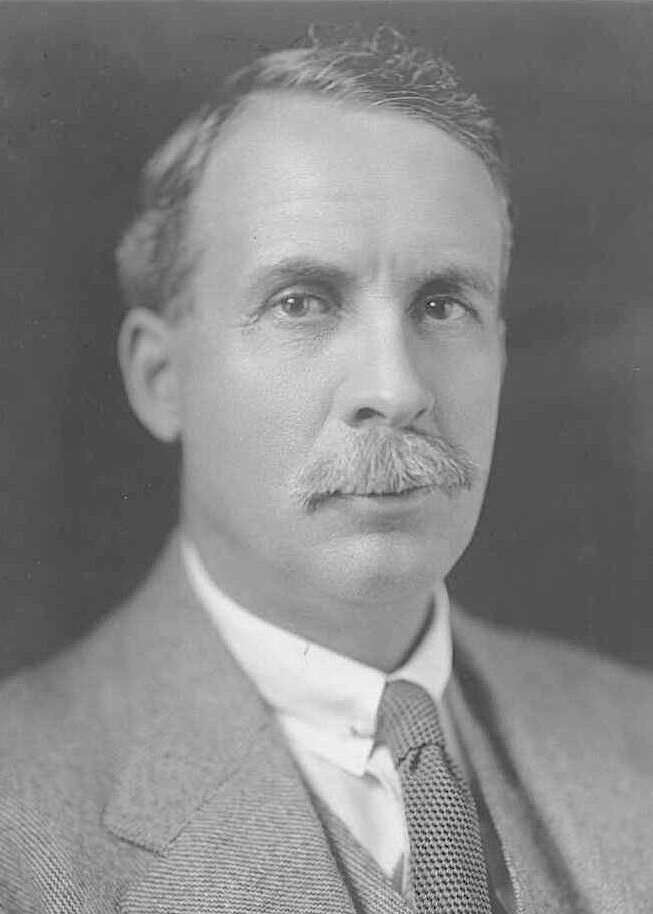

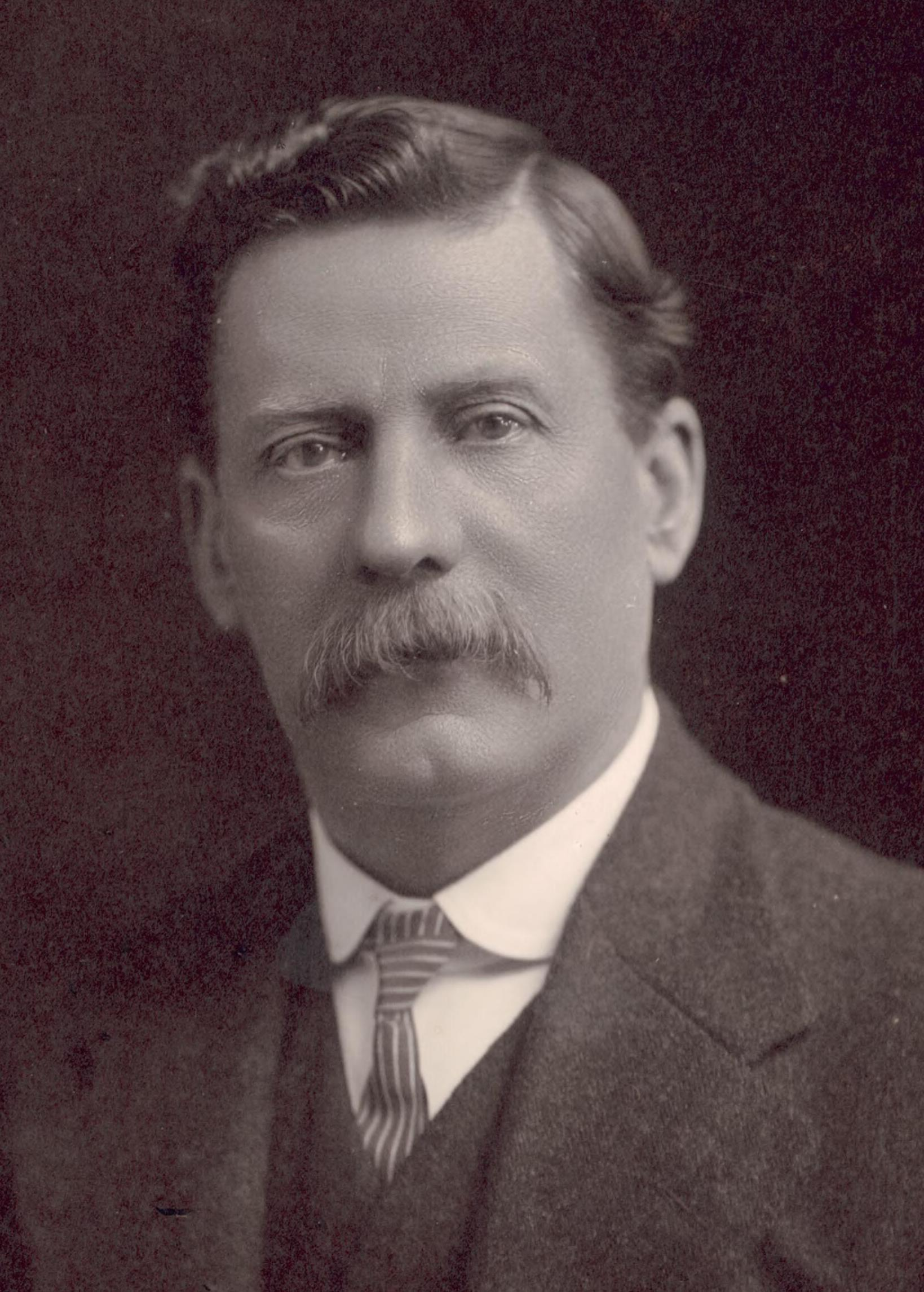
	First party	Second party
Leader	George Pearce	Edward Millen
Party	Labor	Liberal
Leader's seat	Western Australia	New South Wales
Seats before	29	6
Seats won	30	5
Seat change	▲1	▼1
Popular vote	6,119,018	5,605,305
Percentage	52.16%	47.77%
Swing	▲3.43pp	▼1.61pp

The 5 September 1914 election was a double dissolution election which meant all 36 seats in the Senate were up for election, with each Australian states electing six members, with half to serve a six-year term and the rest to serve a three year term. Terms were taken to have commenced on 1 July 1914. The Senate resolved that in each State the three senators who received the most votes would sit for a six-year term, finishing on 30 June 1920 while the other half would sit for a three-year term, finishing on 30 June 1917.

It was a landslide victory for the Labor Party, which won 31 seats and was the largest party by first preference votes in every state except South Australia. The opposition party, the Commonwealth Liberal Party, won just one seat, which was in South Australia, despite retaining four seats (two each in New South Wales and Tasmania). The Liberal Party lost three seats, one each in New South Wales, Victoria and Tasmania, while Labor lost one seat in New South Wales. Every state except Western Australia and South Australia swung to Labor.

== Australia ==
Senate 1914 (FPTP BV) — Turnout 62.16% (Non-CV) — Informal 4.66
Party	Votes	%	Swing	Seats			Change
Party	Votes	%	Swing	6 year term	3 year term	Total	Change
Labor	6,119,018	52.15	+3.43	17	14	31	▲2
Liberal	5,605,305	47.77	−1.61	1	4	4	▼2
Independents	9,799	0.08	−0.78				
Total	11,734,122			18	18	36	
Invalid/blank votes	86,649	4.24	−1.42				
Turnout	2,042,336	73.63	−0.99				
Registered voters	2,811,515						
Source: Psephos: 1914 Senate

== New South Wales ==
Each elector voted for up to six candidates. Percentages refer to the number of voters rather than the number of votes.

1914 Australian federal election: Senate, New South Wales
Party	Candidate	Votes	%	±%
Labor	Albert Gardiner (elected 1)	344,151	51.6	+1.0 (Note: Change compared to the personal vote at the 1910 election.)
Labor	Allan McDougall (elected 2)	342,482	51.3	+0.3
Labor	John Grant (elected 3)	341,934	51.2	+6.0 (Note: Change compared to the personal vote at the 1913 election.)
Liberal	Sir Albert Gould (re-elected 4)	341,569	51.1	−2.5
Liberal	Edward Millen (re-elected 5)	339,476	50.9	−1.6
Labor	David Watson (elected 6)	338,280	50.7	+5.7
Liberal	Charles Oakes (defeated)	333,763	50.0	−2.3
Labor	Arthur Rae (defeated)	333,243	49.9	+0.9
Labor	Ike Smith	324,630	48.6	+6.1
Liberal	Frank Coen	324,152	48.6	
Liberal	Herbert Pratten	322,076	48.3	
Liberal	Arthur Trethowan	318,788	47.8	
Total formal votes		4,004,514; 667,419 voters	95.02	+1.74
Informal votes		34,948	4.98	−1.74
Turnout		702,403	64.85	−4.34
Party total votes
Labor		2,024,690	50.56	+6.34
Liberal		1,979,824	49.44	−3.32

== Queensland ==
Each elector voted for up to six candidates. Percentages refer to the number of voters rather than the number of votes.

1914 Australian federal election: Senate, Queensland
Party	Candidate	Votes	%	±%
Labor	Thomas Givens (re-elected 1)	152,990	57.8	+7.0
Labor	Myles Ferricks (re-elected 2)	152,469	57.6	+2.8
Labor	William Maughan (re-elected 3)	152,321	57.5	+2.8
Labor	James Stewart (re-elected 4)	151,553	57.3	+7.6
Labor	John Mullan (re-elected 5)	150,703	56.9	+6.4
Labor	Harry Turley (re-elected 6)	150,703	56.9	+6.4
Liberal	Thomas Crawford	114,652	43.3	
Liberal	William Aitchison	113,317	42.8	
Liberal	Frederick Johnson	113,230	42.8	
Liberal	Adolphus Jones	112,640	42.6	
Liberal	Edward Smith	111,766	42.2	
Liberal	Michael O'Donnell	111,396	42.1	
Total formal votes		1,588,266; 264,711 voters	95.77	+0.90
Informal votes		11,693	4.23	−0.90
Turnout		276,404	75.07	+1.77
Party total votes
Labor		911,265	57.37	+3.19
Liberal		677,001	42.63	−3.19

== South Australia ==
Each elector voted for up to six candidates. Percentages refer to the number of voters rather than the number of votes.

1914 Australian federal election: Senate, South Australia
Party	Candidate	Votes	%	±%
Liberal	John Shannon (elected 1)	190,590	96.1 (Note: John Shannon was included on the Labor ticket.)	
Labor	John Newlands (re-elected 2)	112,569	56.8	+4.6
Labor	James O'Loghlin (re-elected 3)	112,283	56.6	+4.1
Labor	Robert Guthrie (re-elected 4)	111,774	56.4	+2.4
Labor	William Senior (re-elected 5)	109,975	55.5	+4.4
Labor	William Story (re-elected 6)	108,263	54.6	+8.1
Liberal	Edward Vardon	90,364	45.6	
Liberal	Benjamin Benny	89,568	45.2	
Liberal	George Jenkins	89,194	45.0	
Liberal	George Stewart	88,042	44.4	
Liberal	Patrick Daley	87,365	44.1	
Total formal votes		1,189,987; 198,331 voters	96.16	+1.90
Informal votes		7,913	3.84	−1.90
Turnout		206,244	80.14	+0.04
Party total votes
Liberal		635,123	53.37	+6.97
Labor		554,864	46.63	−6.97

Sitting senator Gregor McGregor (Labor) had re-nominated but died after the close of nominations, leaving Labor with only 5 candidates. Electors were required to vote for 6 candidates or their vote would be invalid. If there was a large informal vote or if the surplus votes were equally distributed there was a risk of Labor losing more than one seat. Labor therefore asked its supporters to vote for John Shannon (Liberal).

== Tasmania ==
Each elector voted for up to six candidates. Percentages refer to the number of voters rather than the number of votes.

1914 Australian federal election: Senate, Tasmania
Party	Candidate	Votes	%	±%
Labor	David O'Keefe (re-elected 1)	39,879	50.9	−5.3
Labor	James Long (re-elected 2)	39,853	50.8	−4.8
Labor	James Guy (elected 3)	39,656	50.6	+6.2
Liberal	John Keating (re-elected 4)	39,193	50.0	−2.3
Labor	Rudolph Ready (re-elected 5)	38,779	49.5	−3.9
Liberal	Thomas Bakhap (re-elected 6)	38,779	49.5	−3.3
Labor	William Shoobridge	38,096	48.6	
Liberal	Edward Mulcahy	38,016	48.5	
Liberal	Louis Shoobridge	38,006	48.5	
Labor	James McDonald	37,771	48.2	
Liberal	John Clemons (defeated)	36,577	46.7	−4.0
Liberal	Hubert Nichols	36,325	46.3	
Independent	Cyril Cameron	6,979	8.9	+2.8
Independent	David Blanchard	2,820	3.6	
Total formal votes		470,292; 78,382 voters	95.29	+1.51
Informal votes		3,871	4.71	−1.51
Turnout		82,253	77.61	+2.30
Party total votes
Labor		234,034	49.76	+3.52
Liberal		226,459	48.15	−3.57
Independent		9,799	2.08	+0.04

== Victoria ==
Each elector voted for up to six candidates. Percentages refer to the number of voters rather than the number of votes.

1914 Australian federal election: Senate, Victoria
Party	Candidate	Votes	%	±%
Labor	John Barnes (re-elected 1)	334,782	53.7	+4.5
Labor	Stephen Barker (re-elected 2)	334,517	53.6	+5.2
Labor	Edward Russell (re-elected 3)	334,238	53.6	+3.5
Labor	Andrew McKissock (elected 4)	333,739	53.5	+4.5
Labor	Albert Blakey (re-elected 5)	331,911	53.2	+5.1
Labor	Edward Findley (re-elected 6)	329,198	52.8	+4.1
Liberal	James McColl (defeated)	294,104	47.2	−2.5
Liberal	Samuel Mauger	293,353	47.0	−1.8
Liberal	William Edgar	289,854	46.5	
Liberal	James Hume Cook	289,478	46.4	
Liberal	William Trenwith	289,196	46.4	
Liberal	William McLean	287,542	46.1	
Total formal votes		3,741,912; 623,652 voters	96.71	+1.6
Informal votes		21,246	3.29	−1.2
Turnout		644,898	79.15	+3.66
Party total votes
Labor		1,998,385	53.41	+3.98
Liberal		1,743,527	46.59	−2.56

== Western Australia ==
Each elector voted for up to six candidates. Percentages refer to the number of voters rather than the number of votes.

1914 Australian federal election: Senate, Western Australia
Party	Candidate	Votes	%	±%
Labor	George Pearce (re-elected 1)	68,245	55.4	−0.2
Labor	Patrick Lynch (re-elected 2)	66,189	53.7	−0.4
Labor	Ted Needham (re-elected 3)	65,960	53.5	−0.5
Labor	George Henderson (re-elected 4)	65,632	53.3	−2.4
Labor	Richard Buzacott (re-elected 5)	65,303	53.0	−1.2
Labor	Hugh de Largie (re-elected 6)	64,452	52.3	+0.4
Liberal	William Butcher	61,288	49.7	+3.9
Liberal	William Dempster	58,208	47.2	
Liberal	George Throssell	56,973	46.2	
Liberal	John Thomson	56,290	45.7	
Liberal	Victor Spencer	55,448	45.0	
Liberal	Charles North	55,164	44.8	
Total formal votes		739,152; 123,192 voters	94.67	+1.3
Informal votes		6,942	5.33	−0.91
Turnout		130,134	71.46	−2.04
Party total votes
Labor		395,781	53.55	−1.03
Liberal		343,371	46.45	+1.03

== See also ==
- Candidates of the 1914 Australian federal election
- Results of the 1914 Australian federal election (House of Representatives)
- Members of the Australian Senate, 1914–1917
