= Candidates of the 1914 Australian federal election =

This article provides information on candidates who stood for the 1914 Australian federal election. The election was held on 5 September 1914.

== By-elections, appointments and defections ==
=== By-elections and appointments ===
- On 22 December 1913, Hugh Mahon (Labor) was declared elected unopposed as the member for Kalgoorlie, succeeding Charlie Frazer (Labor).
- On 10 January 1914, George Edwin Yates (Labor) was elected to replace Ernest Roberts (Labor) as the member for Adelaide.

== Retiring Members and Senators ==
=== Liberal ===
- Agar Wynne MP (Balaclava, Vic)

== House of Representatives ==
Sitting members at the time of the election are shown in bold text. Successful candidates are highlighted in the relevant colour. Where there is possible confusion, an asterisk (*) is also used.

=== New South Wales ===
Electorate	Held by	Labor candidate	Liberal candidate	Other candidates
Barrier	Labor	**Josiah Thomas**	William Ferguson	
Calare	Liberal	William Johnson	**Henry Pigott**	
Cook	Labor	**James Catts**	Stanley Yarrington	Emily Paul (Soc Lab)
Cowper	Liberal		**John Thomson**	
Dalley	Labor	**Robert Howe**	John McEachern	
Darling	Labor	**William Spence**	William Kelk	
East Sydney	Labor	**John West**	Lindsay Thompson	
Eden-Monaro	Liberal	Harry Lestrange	**Austin Chapman**	
Gwydir	Labor	**William Webster**	John Blackney	
Hume	Liberal	Patrick Sullivan	**Robert Patten**	
Hunter	Labor	**Matthew Charlton**	Alexander Hay	
Illawarra	Labor	**George Burns**	George Fuller	
Lang	Liberal	Hector Lamond	**Elliot Johnson**	
Macquarie	Labor	**Ernest Carr**	Robert Moore	
Nepean	Liberal	Voltaire Molesworth	**Richard Orchard**	
New England	Liberal	Edward Bowman	**Percy Abbott**	
Newcastle	Labor	**David Watkins**		
North Sydney	Liberal	Roland Bradley	**Granville Ryrie**	
Parkes	Liberal	William Russell	**Bruce Smith**	
Parramatta	Liberal		**Joseph Cook**	
Richmond	Liberal		**Walter Massy-Greene**	
Riverina	Liberal	John Chanter	**Franc Falkiner**	
Robertson	Liberal	John Fraser	**William Fleming**	
South Sydney	Labor	**Edward Riley**	George Pitt	
Wentworth	Liberal	Robert Cruickshank	**Willie Kelly**	
Werriwa	Liberal	John Lynch	**Alfred Conroy**	
West Sydney	Labor	**Billy Hughes**	Walter Finch	

=== Queensland ===
Electorate	Held by	Labor candidate	Liberal candidate	QFU candidate
Brisbane	Labor	**William Finlayson**	John Lackey	
Capricornia	Labor	**William Higgs**	Neal Macrossan	
Darling Downs	Liberal	Paul Bauers	**Littleton Groom**	
Herbert	Labor	**Fred Bamford**	Frank Fraser	
Kennedy	Labor	**Charles McDonald**		
Lilley	Liberal	Arthur Lilley	**Jacob Stumm**	
Maranoa	Labor	**Jim Page**		
Moreton	Liberal	John Sherlock	**Hugh Sinclair**	
Oxley	Labor	**James Sharpe**	James Bayley	
Wide Bay	Labor	**Andrew Fisher**		John Austin

=== South Australia ===
Electorate	Held by	Labor candidate	Liberal candidate
Adelaide	Labor	**George Edwin Yates**	Walter Hamilton
Angas	Liberal		**Paddy Glynn**
Barker	Liberal	William Sampson	**John Livingston**
Boothby	Labor	**George Dankel**	Samuel Hunt
Grey	Labor	**Alexander Poynton**	William Morrow
Hindmarsh	Labor	**William Archibald**	James Craig
Wakefield	Liberal	William Harvey	**Richard Foster**

=== Tasmania ===
Electorate	Held by	Labor candidate	Liberal candidate
Bass	Labor	**Jens Jensen**	Alexander Marshall
Darwin	Labor	**King O'Malley**	Ernest Plummer
Denison	Labor	**William Laird Smith**	Arthur Clarke
Franklin	Liberal		**William McWilliams**
Wilmot	Liberal	Henry McFie	**Llewellyn Atkinson**

=== Victoria ===
Electorate	Held by	Labor candidate	Liberal candidate	Other candidates
Balaclava	Liberal	John Curtin	William Watt	
Ballaarat	Labor	**Charles McGrath**	Russell Coldham	
Batman	Labor	**Frank Brennan**		
Bendigo	Labor	**John Arthur**	Frank Maldon Robb	
Bourke	Labor	**Frank Anstey**	Richard Jennings	
Corangamite	Liberal	Thomas Burke	**Chester Manifold**	
Corio	Liberal	Alfred Ozanne	**William Kendell**	
Echuca	Liberal	James Gourley	**Albert Palmer**	
Fawkner	Labor	**Joseph Hannan**	Frank Carse	
Flinders	Liberal	John McDougall	**Sir William Irvine**	
Gippsland	Liberal		**James Bennett**	George Wise (Ind Lab)
Grampians	Liberal	Edward Jolley	**Hans Irvine**	
Henty	Liberal	Albert Andrews	**James Boyd**	Richard Crouch (Ind)
Indi	Liberal	Parker Moloney	**Cornelius Ahern**	
Kooyong	Liberal		**Sir Robert Best**	Vida Goldstein (Ind Soc Lab); Edward Terry (Ind)
Maribyrnong	Labor	**James Fenton**	Edward Reynolds	
Melbourne	Labor	**William Maloney**	Wilfred Kent Hughes	
Melbourne Ports	Labor	**James Mathews**		
Wannon	Liberal	Neil Mackinnon	**Arthur Rodgers**	
Wimmera	Liberal		**Sydney Sampson**	
Yarra	Labor	**Frank Tudor**		

=== Western Australia ===
Electorate	Held by	Labor candidate	Liberal candidate
Dampier	Liberal	Patrick Coffey	**Henry Gregory**
Fremantle	Labor	**Reginald Burchell**	Thomas Briggs
Kalgoorlie	Labor	**Hugh Mahon**	
Perth	Liberal	Alick McCallum	**James Fowler**
Swan	Liberal	Walter Peters	**Sir John Forrest**

== Senate ==
Sitting Senators are shown in bold text. As this was a double dissolution election, all senators were up for re-election. Tickets that elected at least one Senator are highlighted in the relevant colour. Successful candidates are identified by an asterisk (*).

=== New South Wales ===
Six seats were up for election. The Labor Party was defending three seats. The Liberal Party was defending three seats.

Labor candidates	Liberal candidates
**Albert Gardiner***; John Grant*; **Allan McDougall***; **Arthur Rae**; Ike Smith; David Watson*	Frank Coen; **Sir Albert Gould***; **Edward Millen***; **Charles Oakes**; Herbert Pratten; Arthur Trethowan

=== Queensland ===
Six seats were up for election. The Labor Party was defending six seats.

Labor candidates	Liberal candidates
**Myles Ferricks***; **Thomas Givens***; **William Maughan***; **John Mullan***; **James Stewart***; **Harry Turley***	William Aitchison; Thomas Crawford; Frederick Johnson; Adolphus Jones; Michael O'Donnell; Edward Smith

=== South Australia ===
Six seats were up for re-election. The Labor Party was defending six seats.

Labor candidates	Liberal candidates
**Robert Guthrie***; **John Newland***; **James O'Loghlin***; **William Senior***; **William Story***	Benjamin Benny; Patrick Daley; George Jenkins; John Shannon*; George Stewart; Edward Vardon

Labor had only five candidates because Senator Gregor McGregor had re-nominated but died after the close of nominations. As electors had to cast six votes, Labor directed the sixth vote to Shannon, who was elected with over 95% of the vote.

=== Tasmania ===
Six seats were up for election. The Labor Party was defending three seats. The Liberal Party was defending three seats.

Labor candidates	Liberal candidates	Independent candidates
James Guy*; **James Long***; James McDonald; **David O'Keefe***; **Rudolph Ready***; William Shoobridge	**Thomas Bakhap***; **John Clemons**; **John Keating***; Edward Mulcahy; Hubert Nichols; Louis Shoobridge	David Blanchard; Cyril Cameron

=== Victoria ===
Six seats were up for election. The Labor Party was defending five seats. The Liberal Party was defending one seat.

Labor candidates	Liberal candidates
**Stephen Barker***; **John Barnes***; **Albert Blakey***; **Edward Findley***; Andrew McKissock*; **Edward Russell***	James Hume Cook; William Edgar; **James McColl**; William McLean; Samuel Mauger; William Trenwith

=== Western Australia ===
Six seats were up for election. The Labor Party was defending six seats.

Labor candidates	Liberal candidates
**Richard Buzacott***; **Hugh de Largie***; **George Henderson***; **Patrick Lynch***; **Ted Needham***; **George Pearce***	William Butcher; William Dempster; Charles North; Victor Spencer; John Thomson; George Throssell

== See also ==
- 1914 Australian federal election
- Members of the Australian House of Representatives, 1913–1914
- Members of the Australian House of Representatives, 1914–1917
- Members of the Australian Senate, 1913–1914
- Members of the Australian Senate, 1914–1917
- List of political parties in Australia
