= Members of the Australian Senate, 1913–1914 =

Members of the Australian Senate, 1913-1914
- ←1910-1913 1914-1917→
- Senate composition at 1 July 1913; Government (29) - (10 seat majority) Labor (29) Opposition (7) Liberal (7)

This is a list of members of the Australian Senate from 1913 to 1914. Half of its members were elected at the 13 April 1910 election and had terms starting on 1 July 1910 and finishing on 30 June 1916; the other half were elected at the 31 May 1913 election and had terms starting on 1 July 1913 and finishing on 30 June 1919. In fact their terms were terminated prematurely with the calling of the 5 September 1914 election as a double dissolution.

Senator	Party	State	Term ending	Years in office
Thomas Bakhap	Liberal	Tasmania	1919	1913–1923
Stephen Barker	Labor	Victoria	1916	1910–1920, 1923–1924
John Barnes	Labor	Victoria	1919	1913–1920, 1923–1935
Albert Blakey	Labor	Victoria	1916	1910–1917
Richard Buzacott	Labor	Western Australia	1916	1910–1923
John Clemons	Liberal	Tasmania	1919	1901–1914
Hugh de Largie	Labor	Western Australia	1916	1901–1923
Myles Ferricks	Labor	Queensland	1919	1913–1920
Edward Findley	Labor	Victoria	1916	1904–1917, 1923–1929
Albert Gardiner	Labor	New South Wales	1916	1910–1926, 1928
Thomas Givens	Labor	Queensland	1916	1904–1928
Albert Gould	Liberal	New South Wales	1919	1901–1917
Robert Guthrie	Labor	South Australia	1916	1904–1921
George Henderson	Labor	Western Australia	1916	1904–1923
John Keating	Liberal	Tasmania	1919	1901–1923
James Long	Labor	Tasmania	1916	1910–1918
Patrick Lynch	Labor	Western Australia	1919	1907–1938
William Maughan	Labor	Queensland	1919	1913–1920
James McColl	Liberal	Victoria	1919	1907–1914
Allan McDougall	Labor	New South Wales	1916	1910–1920, 1922–1924
Gregor McGregor (Note: Gregor McGregor died in August 1914 between the day of his nomination and the day of polling in September 1914)	Labor	South Australia	1916	1901–1914
Edward Millen	Liberal	New South Wales	1919	1901–1923
John Mullan	Labor	Queensland	1919	1913–1917
Ted Needham	Labor	Western Australia	1919	1907–1920, 1923–1929
John Newlands	Labor	South Australia	1919	1913–1932
Charles Oakes	Liberal	New South Wales	1919	1913–1914
David O'Keefe	Labor	Tasmania	1916	1901–-1906, 1910-1920
James O'Loghlin	Labor	South Australia	1919	1907, 1913–1920, 1923–1925
George Pearce	Labor	Western Australia	1919	1901–1938
Arthur Rae	Labor	New South Wales	1916	1910–1914, 1929–1935
Rudolph Ready	Labor	Tasmania	1916	1910–1917
Edward Russell	Labor	Victoria	1919	1907–1925
William Senior	Labor	South Australia	1919	1913–1923
James Stewart	Labor	Queensland	1916	1901–1917
William Story	Labor	South Australia	1916	1904–1917
Harry Turley	Labor	Queensland	1916	1904–1917
