= 1910 Australian Senate election =

- 13 April 1910

18 of the 36 seats in the Senate 18 seats needed for a majority
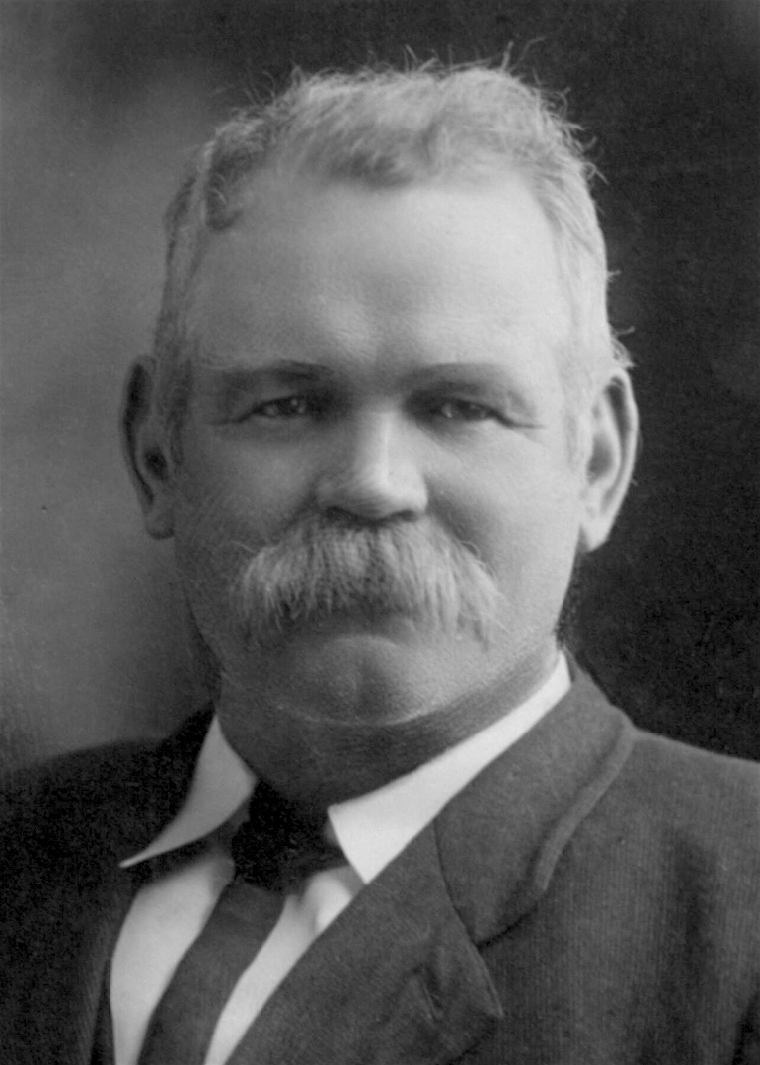

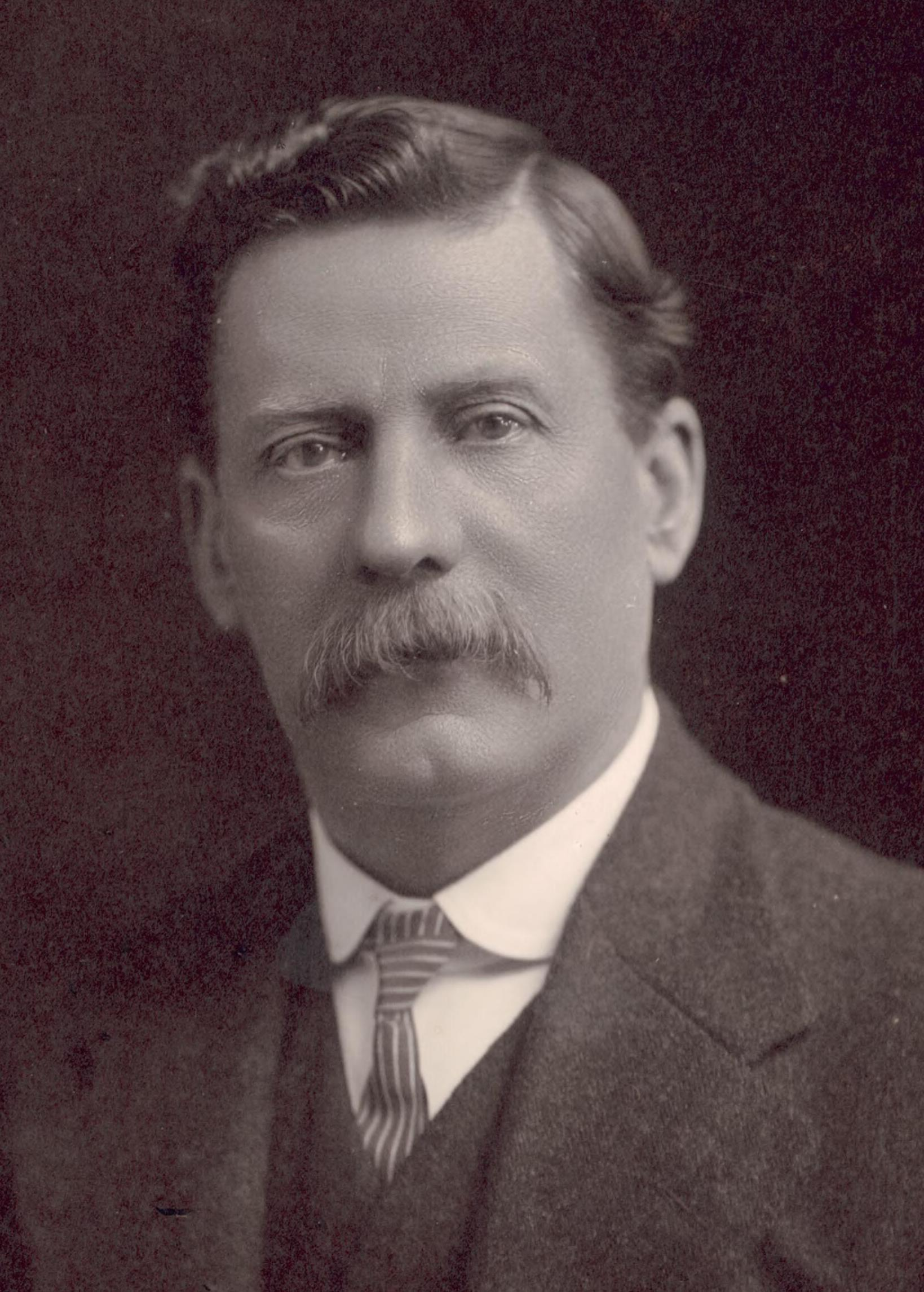
	First party	Second party
Leader	Gregor McGregor	Edward Millen
Party	Labor	Liberal
Leader's seat	South Australia	New South Wales
Seats before	15	20
Seats won	18	0
Seats after	22	14
Seat change	▲7	▼6
Popular vote	2,021,090	1,830,353
Percentage	50.30%	45.55%
Swing	▲11.57pp	▼11.25pp

The Australian states each elected three members of the Australian Senate at the 1910 federal election to serve a six-year term starting on 1 July 1910.

== Australia ==
Senate 1910–13 (FPTP BV) — Turnout 62.16% (Non-CV) — Informal 4.66
Party	Votes	%	Swing	Seats won	Seats held	Change
Labour	2,021,090	50.30	+11.57	18	22	▲7
Liberal	1,830,353	45.55	−11.25 (Note: Change compared to the combined Anti-Socialist and Protectionist vote at the 1906 election.)	0	14	▼6
Independents	134,976	3.36	+2.46	0	0	▼1
Socialist Labor	31,700	0.79	−0.51			
Total	4,018,119			18	36	
Invalid/blank votes	62,700 (Note: Informal votes does not include Tasmania.)	4.66	–1.7			
Turnout	1,402,106	62.08				
Registered voters	2,258,482					
Source: Psephos: 1910 Senate

== New South Wales ==
Each elector voted for up to three candidates. Percentages refer to the number of voters rather than the number of votes.

1910 Australian federal election: Senate, New South Wales
Party	Candidate	Votes	%	±%
Labour	Allan McDougall (elected 1)	249,212	51.0	
Labour	Albert Gardiner (elected 2)	247,047	50.6	+8.9 (Note: Change compared to the personal vote at the 1906 election.)
Labour	Arthur Rae (elected 3)	239,307	49.0	
Liberal	John Gray (defeated)	214,889	44.0	−15.2 (Note: Change compared to the personal vote at the 1903 election.)
Liberal	Edward Pulsford (defeated)	212,150	44.0	−17.0
Liberal	John Neild (defeated)	212,150	43.4	−18.2
Independent	John Norton	50,893	10.4	
Socialist Labor	Robert Mackenzie	13,608	2.8	
Socialist Labor	James Moroney	9,660	2.0	−6.3
Socialist Labor	Thomas Hoare	8,432	1.7	
Total formal votes		1,465,767; 488,589 voters	95.3	+2.6
Informal votes		24,213	4.7	−2.6
Turnout		512,802	61.4	+9.7
Party total votes
Labour		735,566	50.5	+9.2
Liberal		647,608	44.4	−10.8 (Note: Change compared to the combined Anti-Socialist and Protectionist vote at the 1906 election.)
Independent		50,893	3.5	
Socialist Labor		23,268	1.6	−1.8

== Queensland ==
Each elector voted for up to three candidates. Percentages refer to the number of voters rather than the number of votes.

1910 Australian federal election: Senate, Queensland
Party	Candidate	Votes	%	±%
Labour	Thomas Givens (re-elected 1)	82,234	50.8	−1.0
Labour	Harry Turley (re-elected 2)	81,719	50.5	−4.6
Labour	James Stewart (re-elected 3)	80,339	49.7	−3.8
Liberal	Thomas Glassey	77,895	48.1	
Liberal	Hugh Macrossan	77,367	47.8	
Liberal	Joe Millican	75,707	46.8	
Independent	William Kellett	6,065	3.7	
Independent	Horace Ransome	4,014	2.5	
Total formal votes		485,340; 161,780 voters	94.8	+0.7
Informal votes		8,854	5.2	−0.7
Turnout		170,634	61.2	+15.3
Party total votes
Labour		244,292	50.3	+8.3
Liberal		230,969	47.6	−2.8 (Note: Change compared to the combined Anti-Socialist and Protectionist vote at the 1906 election.)
Independent		10,079	2.1	

== South Australia ==
Each elector voted for up to three candidates. Percentages refer to the number of voters rather than the number of votes.

1910 Australian federal election: Senate, South Australia
Party	Candidate	Votes	%	±%
Labour	Gregor McGregor (re-elected 1)	58,955	55.2	−2.8
Labour	Robert Guthrie (re-elected 2)	57,733	54.0	+1.0
Labour	William Story (re-elected 3)	31,489	46.5	+8.5
Liberal	David Gordon	50,729	47.5	
Liberal	David Charleston	49,063	45.9	+0.7
Liberal	John Shannon	48,834	45.7	
Total formal votes		320,484; 106,828 voters	96.7	+0.6
Informal votes		3,675	3.3	−0.6
Turnout		70,517	53.2	+16.7
Party total votes
Labour		171,858	53.6	+7.1
Liberal		148,626	46.4	−0.7 (Note: Change compared to the combined Anti-Socialist and Protectionist vote at the 1906 election.)

== Tasmania ==
Each elector voted for up to three candidates. Percentages refer to the number of voters rather than the number of votes.

1910 Australian federal election: Senate, Tasmania
Party	Candidate	Votes	%	±%
Labour	David O'Keefe (elected 1)	31,304	56.2	+8.8
Labour	James Long (re-elected 2)	30,973	55.6	
Labour	Rudolph Ready (elected 3)	29,756	53.4	
Liberal	Henry Dobson (defeated)	24,422	43.8	−6.8
Liberal	Edward Mulcahy (defeated)	24,419	43.8	+7.9
Liberal	James Macfarlane (defeated)	24,233	43.5	−0.9
Independent	James Campbell	2,041	3.8	
Total formal votes		167,148; 55,716 voters		
Informal votes		unknown		
Turnout		unknown		
Party total votes
Labour		92,033	55.1	+24.5
Liberal		73,074	43.7	−25.7 (Note: Change compared to the combined Anti-Socialist and Protectionist vote at the 1906 election.)

== Victoria ==
Each elector voted for up to three candidates. Percentages refer to the number of voters rather than the number of votes.

1910 Australian federal election: Senate, Victoria
Party	Candidate	Votes	%	±%
Labour	Edward Findley (re-elected 1)	217,573	48.7	+19.8
Labour	Stephen Barker (elected 2)	216,199	48.4	+23.7
Labour	Albert Blakey (elected 3)	215,117	48.1	
Liberal	Robert Best (defeated)	213,976	47.9	+16.0
Liberal	William Trenwith (defeated)	211,058	47.2	+13.8
Liberal	James McCay	195,477	43.7	
Independent	Vida Goldstein	53,583	12.0	
Independent	James Ronald	18,380	4.1	
Total formal votes		1,341,363; 447,121 voters	95.4	+1.6
Informal votes		21,414	4.6	−1.6
Turnout		468,535	66.6	+9.9
Party total votes
Labour		648,889	48.4	+15.7
Liberal		620,511	46.3	−20.9 (Note: Change compared to the combined Anti-Socialist and Protectionist vote at the 1906 election.)
Independent		71,963	5.4	

== Western Australia ==
Each elector voted for up to three candidates. Percentages refer to the number of voters rather than the number of votes.

1910 Australian federal election: Senate, Western Australia
Party	Candidate	Votes	%	±%
Labour	George Henderson (re-elected 1)	44,215	55.7	−3.4
Labour	Richard Buzacott (elected 2)	43,032	54.2	
Labour	Hugh de Largie (re-elected 3)	41,205	51.9	−11.2
Liberal	Walter Kingsmill	37,263	46.9	
Liberal	Archibald Sanderson	36,453	45.9	
Liberal	Nathaniel Harper	35,948	45.3	
Total formal votes		238,116; 79,372 voters	94.6	+1.3
Informal votes		4,544	5.4	−1.3
Turnout		83,916	62.2	+26.0
Party total votes
Labour		128,452	53.9	−1.6
Liberal		109,664	46.1	

== See also ==
- Candidates of the 1910 Australian federal election
- Results of the 1910 Australian federal election (House of Representatives)
- Members of the Australian Senate, 1910–1913
