= Members of the Australian Senate, 1910–1913 =

Members of the Australian Senate, 1910-1913
- ←1907-1910 1913-1914→
- Senate composition at 1 July 1910; Government (23) - (5 seat majority) Labor (23) (Note: Labor senator William Russell died in June 1912 and was replaced by Commonwealth Liberal John Shannon.) Opposition (12); Liberal (12) Crossbench (1); Independent (1) Changes in composition

This is a list of members of the Australian Senate from 1910 to 1913. Half of its members were elected at the 12 December 1906 election and had terms starting on 1 January 1907 and finishing on 30 June 1913—they had an extended term as a result of the 1906 referendum, which changed Senate terms to finish on 30 December, rather than 30 June—the other half were elected at the 13 April 1910 election and had terms starting on 1 July 1910 and finishing on 30 June 1916. Parties reflect those acknowledged at the time of the 1910 election. (Note: The Commonwealth Liberal Party was formed in 1909 by the merger of the Anti-Socialist and Protectionist parties.)

Senator	Party	State	Term ending	Years in office
Stephen Baker	Labor	Victoria	1916	1910–1920, 1923–1924
Albert Blakey	Labor	Victoria	1916	1910–1917
Richard Buzacott	Labor	Western Australia	1916	1910–1923
Cyril Cameron	Liberal	Tasmania	1913	1901–1903, 1907–1913
Thomas Chataway	Liberal	Queensland	1913	1907–1913
John Clemons	Liberal	Tasmania	1913	1901–1914
Hugh de Largie	Labor	Western Australia	1916	1901–1923
Edward Findley	Labor	Victoria	1916	1904–1917, 1923–1929
Simon Fraser	Liberal	Victoria	1913	1901–1913
Albert Gardiner	Labor	New South Wales	1916	1910–1926, 1928
Thomas Givens	Labor	Queensland	1916	1904–1928
Albert Gould	Liberal	New South Wales	1913	1901–1917
Robert Guthrie	Labor	South Australia	1916	1904–1921
George Henderson	Labor	Western Australia	1916	1904–1923
John Keating	Liberal	Tasmania	1913	1901–1923
James Long	Labor	Tasmania	1916	1910–1918
Patrick Lynch	Labor	Western Australia	1913	1907–1938
James McColl	Liberal	Victoria	1913	1907–1914
Allan McDougall	Labor	New South Wales	1916	1910–1920, 1922–1924
Gregor McGregor	Labor	South Australia	1916	1901–1914
Edward Millen	Liberal	New South Wales	1913	1901–1923
Ted Needham	Labor	Western Australia	1913	1907–1920, 1923–1929
David O'Keefe	Labor	Tasmania	1916	1901–1906, 1910–1920
George Pearce	Labor	Western Australia	1913	1901–1938
Arthur Rae	Labor	New South Wales	1916	1910–1914, 1929–1935
Rudolph Ready	Labor	Tasmania	1916	1910–1917
Edward Russell	Labor	Victoria	1913	1907–1925
William Russell (Note: Labor senator William Russell died on 28 June 1912; on 31 July Commonwealth Liberal John Shannon was appointed to replace him.)	Labor	South Australia	1913	1907–1913
Anthony St Ledger	Liberal	Queensland	1913	1907–1913
Robert Sayers	Liberal	Queensland	1913	1907–1913
John Shannon	Liberal	South Australia	1913 (Note: Appointed to a casual vacancy and only held office until the earlier of the next election for the House of Representatives or the Senate.)	1912–1913, 1914–1920
James Stewart	Labor	Queensland	1916	1901–1917
William Story	Labor	South Australia	1916	1904–1917
Sir Josiah Symon	Independent (Note: Sir Josiah Symon became an independent rather than join the Liberal Party formed by the merger of the Anti-Socialist and Protectionist parties.)	South Australia	1913	1901–1913
Harry Turley	Labor	Queensland	1916	1904–1917
Joseph Vardon	Liberal	South Australia	1913	1907, 1908–1913
James Walker	Liberal	New South Wales	1913	1901–1913
