= 1914 Australian House of Representatives election =

Australian federal election, 5 September 1914 House of Representatives << 1913–1917 >>
Enrolled voters	2,811,515				
Votes cast	1,726,906		Turnout	73.53	+0.04
Informal votes	40,143		Informal	2.32	–0.51
Summary of votes by party
Party	Primary votes	%	Swing	Seats	Change
Labor	858,451	50.89%	+2.42%	42	+ 5
Liberal	796,397	47.21%	–1.73%	32	– 6
Independent	31,915	1.89%	–0.70%	1	+ 1
Total	1,686,763			75	

This is a list of electoral division results for the Australian 1914 federal election.

== New South Wales ==
=== Barrier ===
1914 Australian federal election: Barrier
Party	Candidate	Votes	%	±%
Labor	Josiah Thomas	16,063	79.7	+2.9
Liberal	William Ferguson	4,094	20.3	−2.9
Total formal votes		20,157	97.6	
Informal votes		498	2.4	
Turnout		20,655	56.3	
Labor hold		Swing	+2.9	

=== Calare ===
1914 Australian federal election: Calare
Party	Candidate	Votes	%	±%
Liberal	Henry Pigott	12,770	51.2	−0.9
Labor	William Johnson	12,169	48.8	+0.9
Total formal votes		24,939	97.5	
Informal votes		635	2.5	
Turnout		25,574	77.9	
Liberal hold		Swing	−0.9	

=== Cook ===
1914 Australian federal election: Cook
Party	Candidate	Votes	%	±%
Labor	James Catts	16,568	60.7	+2.0
Liberal	Stanley Yarrington	10,197	37.4	−1.6
Socialist	Emily Paul	509	1.9	−0.3
Total formal votes		27,274	97.7	
Informal votes		629	2.3	
Turnout		27,903	60.6	
Labor hold		Swing	+1.8	

=== Cowper ===
1914 Australian federal election: Cowper
Party	Candidate	Votes	%	±%
Liberal	John Thomson	unopposed		
Liberal hold		Swing		

=== Dalley ===
1914 Australian federal election: Dalley
Party	Candidate	Votes	%	±%
Labor	Robert Howe	14,963	61.3	+3.6
Liberal	John McEachern	9,450	38.7	−3.6
Total formal votes		24,413	97.7	
Informal votes		587	2.3	
Turnout		25,000	58.5	
Labor hold		Swing	+3.6	

=== Darling ===
1914 Australian federal election: Darling
Party	Candidate	Votes	%	±%
Labor	William Spence	12,309	60.5	+0.0
Liberal	William Kelk	8,036	39.5	−0.0
Total formal votes		20,345	96.1	
Informal votes		818	3.9	
Turnout		21,163	69.5	
Labor hold		Swing	+0.0	

=== East Sydney ===
1914 Australian federal election: East Sydney
Party	Candidate	Votes	%	±%
Labor	John West	12,831	57.3	+1.2
Liberal	Lindsay Thompson	9,568	42.7	−1.2
Total formal votes		22,399	96.8	
Informal votes		736	3.2	
Turnout		23,135	51.1	
Labor hold		Swing	+1.2	

=== Eden-Monaro ===
1914 Australian federal election: Eden-Monaro
Party	Candidate	Votes	%	±%
Liberal	Austin Chapman	13,439	59.2	+0.5
Labor	Harry Lestrange	9,261	40.8	−0.5
Total formal votes		22,700	97.6	
Informal votes		589	2.5	
Turnout		23,289	72.7	
Liberal hold		Swing	+0.5	

=== Gwydir ===
1914 Australian federal election: Gwydir
Party	Candidate	Votes	%	±%
Labor	William Webster	13,560	53.8	+1.6
Liberal	John Blackney	11,658	46.2	−1.6
Total formal votes		25,218	97.2	
Informal votes		719	2.8	
Turnout		25,937	73.3	
Labor hold		Swing	+1.6	

=== Hume ===
1914 Australian federal election: Hume
Party	Candidate	Votes	%	±%
Liberal	Robert Patten	13,841	51.0	+0.3
Labor	Patrick Sullivan	13,320	49.0	+49.0
Total formal votes		27,161	97.7	
Informal votes		645	2.3	
Turnout		27,806	76.2	
Liberal hold		Swing	+0.3	

=== Hunter ===
1914 Australian federal election: Hunter
Party	Candidate	Votes	%	±%
Labor	Matthew Charlton	12,057	54.6	+0.1
Liberal	Alexander Hay	10,045	45.4	−0.1
Total formal votes		22,102	98.1	
Informal votes		429	1.9	
Turnout		22,531	61.5	
Labor hold		Swing	+0.1	

=== Illawarra ===
1914 Australian federal election: Illawarra
Party	Candidate	Votes	%	±%
Labor	George Burns	17,884	54.2	+4.0
Liberal	George Fuller	15,096	45.8	−4.0
Total formal votes		32,980	98.9	
Informal votes		382	1.1	
Turnout		33,362	75.7	
Labor hold		Swing	+4.0	

=== Lang ===
1914 Australian federal election: Lang
Party	Candidate	Votes	%	±%
Liberal	Elliot Johnson	16,556	53.5	−3.6
Labor	Hector Lamond	14,391	46.5	+3.6
Total formal votes		30,947	98.0	
Informal votes		639	2.0	
Turnout		31,586	64.2	
Liberal hold		Swing	−3.6	

=== Macquarie ===
1914 Australian federal election: Macquarie
Party	Candidate	Votes	%	±%
Labor	Ernest Carr	12,888	53.3	+3.3
Liberal	Robert Moore	11,288	46.7	−0.2
Total formal votes		24,176	97.8	
Informal votes		538	2.2	
Turnout		24,714	74.3	
Labor hold		Swing	+1.7	

=== Nepean ===
1914 Australian federal election: Nepean
Party	Candidate	Votes	%	±%
Liberal	Richard Orchard	16,815	52.7	−1.5
Labor	Voltaire Molesworth	15,092	47.3	+4.3
Total formal votes		31,907	97.7	
Informal votes		747	2.3	
Turnout		32,654	69.2	
Liberal hold		Swing	−2.9	

=== New England ===
1914 Australian federal election: New England
Party	Candidate	Votes	%	±%
Liberal	Percy Abbott	13,929	56.7	+0.2
Labor	Edward Bowman	10,633	43.3	−0.2
Total formal votes		24,562	97.9	
Informal votes		533	2.1	
Turnout		25,095	73.8	
Liberal hold		Swing	+0.2	

=== Newcastle ===
1914 Australian federal election: Newcastle
Party	Candidate	Votes	%	±%
Labor	David Watkins	unopposed		
Labor hold		Swing		

=== North Sydney ===
1914 Australian federal election: North Sydney
Party	Candidate	Votes	%	±%
Liberal	Granville Ryrie	19,810	67.6	−1.5
Labor	Roland Bradley	9,507	32.4	+1.5
Total formal votes		29,317	97.2	
Informal votes		853	2.8	
Turnout		30,170	63.7	
Liberal hold		Swing	−1.5	

=== Parkes ===
1914 Australian federal election: Parkes
Party	Candidate	Votes	%	±%
Liberal	Bruce Smith	19,259	58.5	−3.4
Labor	William Russell	13,676	41.5	+3.4
Total formal votes		32,935	97.9	
Informal votes		722	2.1	
Turnout		33,657	64.9	
Liberal hold		Swing	−3.4	

=== Parramatta ===
1914 Australian federal election: Parramatta
Party	Candidate	Votes	%	±%
Liberal	Joseph Cook	unopposed		
Liberal hold		Swing		

=== Richmond ===
1914 Australian federal election: Richmond
Party	Candidate	Votes	%	±%
Liberal	Walter Massy-Greene	unopposed		
Liberal hold		Swing	unopposed	

=== Riverina ===
1914 Australian federal election: Riverina
Party	Candidate	Votes	%	±%
Labor	John Chanter	14,454	52.1	+3.1
Liberal	Franc Falkiner	13,315	47.9	−3.1
Total formal votes		27,769	97.3	
Informal votes		773	2.7	
Turnout		28,542	74.3	
Labor gain from Liberal		Swing	+3.1	

=== Robertson ===
1914 Australian federal election: Robertson
Party	Candidate	Votes	%	±%
Liberal	William Fleming	11,822	53.4	−1.9
Labor	John Fraser	10,337	46.6	+1.9
Total formal votes		22,159	97.4	
Informal votes		591	2.6	
Turnout		22,750	69.8	
Liberal hold		Swing	−1.9	

=== South Sydney ===
1914 Australian federal election: South Sydney
Party	Candidate	Votes	%	±%
Labor	Edward Riley	15,792	68.8	+3.8
Liberal	George Pitt	7,157	31.2	−3.8
Total formal votes		22,949	97.1	
Informal votes		680	2.9	
Turnout		23,629	52.8	
Labor hold		Swing	+3.8	

=== Wentworth ===
1914 Australian federal election: Wentworth
Party	Candidate	Votes	%	±%
Liberal	Willie Kelly	17,079	56.5	−5.2
Labor	Robert Cruickshank	13,171	43.5	+5.2
Total formal votes		30,250	97.5	
Informal votes		790	2.5	
Turnout		31,040	63.9	
Liberal hold		Swing	−5.2	

=== Werriwa ===
1914 Australian federal election: Werriwa
Party	Candidate	Votes	%	±%
Labor	John Lynch	13,162	50.0	+5.9
Liberal	Alfred Conroy	13,155	50.0	−5.9
Total formal votes		26,317	97.9	
Informal votes		552	2.1	
Turnout		26,869	75.7	
Labor gain from Liberal		Swing	+5.9	

=== West Sydney ===
1914 Australian federal election: West Sydney
Party	Candidate	Votes	%	±%
Labor	Billy Hughes	15,774	75.3	+4.0
Liberal	Walter Finch	5,187	24.7	−4.0
Total formal votes		20,961	96.6	
Informal votes		731	3.4	
Turnout		21,692	54.8	
Labor hold		Swing	+4.0	

== Victoria ==
=== Balaclava ===
1914 Australian federal election: Balaclava
Party	Candidate	Votes	%	±%
Liberal	William Watt	17,607	58.4	−6.6
Labor	John Curtin	12,526	41.6	+6.6
Total formal votes		30,133	97.7	
Informal votes		719	2.3	
Turnout		30,852	78.5	
Liberal hold		Swing	−6.6	

=== Ballaarat ===
1914 Australian federal election: Ballaarat
Party	Candidate	Votes	%	±%
Labor	Charles McGrath	16,734	51.2	+0.6
Liberal	Russell Coldham	15,963	48.8	−0.6
Total formal votes		32,697	98.3	
Informal votes		566	1.7	
Turnout		33,263	87.3	
Labor hold		Swing	+0.6	

=== Batman ===
1914 Australian federal election: Batman
Party	Candidate	Votes	%	±%
Labor	Frank Brennan	unopposed		
Labor hold		Swing		

=== Bendigo ===
1914 Australian federal election: Bendigo
Party	Candidate	Votes	%	±%
Labor	John Arthur	16,134	55.1	+4.6
Liberal	Frank Maldon Robb	13,145	44.9	−1.7
Total formal votes		29,279	99.3	
Informal votes		509	1.7	
Turnout		29,788	83.8	
Labor hold		Swing	+3.1	

=== Bourke ===
1914 Australian federal election: Bourke
Party	Candidate	Votes	%	±%
Labor	Frank Anstey	22,075	65.9	+5.9
Liberal	Richard Jennings	11,407	34.1	−5.9
Total formal votes		33,482	98.3	
Informal votes		583	1.7	
Turnout		34,065	76.3	
Labor hold		Swing	+5.9	

=== Corangamite ===
1914 Australian federal election: Corangamite
Party	Candidate	Votes	%	±%
Liberal	Chester Manifold	16,575	51.6	−0.6
Labor	Thomas Burke	15,535	48.4	+0.6
Total formal votes		32,110	98.4	
Informal votes		530	1.6	
Turnout		32,640	85.8	
Liberal hold		Swing	−0.6	

=== Corio ===
1914 Australian federal election: Corio
Party	Candidate	Votes	%	±%
Labor	Alfred Ozanne	16,064	51.2	+3.3
Liberal	William Kendell	15,316	48.8	−2.6
Total formal votes		31,380	98.4	
Informal votes		519	1.6	
Turnout		31,899	82.4	
Labor gain from Liberal		Swing	+3.0	

=== Echuca ===
1914 Australian federal election: Echuca
Party	Candidate	Votes	%	±%
Liberal	Albert Palmer	16,805	58.2	+0.6
Labor	James Gourley	12,053	41.8	+6.1
Total formal votes		28,858	98.0	
Informal votes		589	2.0	
Turnout		29,447	80.7	
Liberal hold		Swing	−2.8	

=== Fawkner ===
1914 Australian federal election: Fawkner
Party	Candidate	Votes	%	±%
Labor	Joseph Hannan	17,483	59.3	+6.0
Liberal	Frank Carse	11,981	40.7	−6.0
Total formal votes		29,464	97.9	
Informal votes		626	2.1	
Turnout		30,090	75.7	
Labor hold		Swing	+6.0	

=== Flinders ===
1914 Australian federal election: Flinders
Party	Candidate	Votes	%	±%
Liberal	Sir William Irvine	14,956	52.7	−5.1
Labor	John McDougall	13,448	47.3	+5.1
Total formal votes		28,404	97.8	
Informal votes		629	2.2	
Turnout		29,033	77.6	
Liberal hold		Swing	−5.1	

=== Gippsland ===
1914 Australian federal election: Gippsland
Party	Candidate	Votes	%	±%
Independent Labor	George Wise	15,484	51.0	+6.0
Liberal	James Bennett	14,874	49.0	−6.0
Total formal votes		30,358	98.5	
Informal votes		473	1.5	
Turnout		30,831	83.3	
Independent Labor gain from Liberal		Swing	+6.0	

=== Grampians ===
1914 Australian federal election: Grampians
Party	Candidate	Votes	%	±%
Labor	Edward Jolley	14,694	50.3	+4.2
Liberal	Hans Irvine	14,517	49.7	−4.2
Total formal votes		29,211	98.3	
Informal votes		495	1.7	
Turnout		29,706	85.5	
Labor gain from Liberal		Swing	+4.2	

=== Henty ===
1914 Australian federal election: Henty
Party	Candidate	Votes	%	±%
Liberal	James Boyd	17,742	42.8	−13.5
Labor	Albert Andrews	12,607	37.5	+5.3
Independent	Richard Crouch	3,238	9.6	+9.6
Total formal votes		33,587	97.8	
Informal votes		753	2.2	
Turnout		34,340	74.7	
Liberal hold		Swing	−9.4	

=== Indi ===
1914 Australian federal election: Indi
Party	Candidate	Votes	%	±%
Labor	Parker Moloney	15,519	51.0	+3.1
Liberal	Cornelius Ahern	14,900	49.0	−2.8
Total formal votes		30,419	99.3	
Informal votes		217	0.7	
Turnout		30,636	86.9	
Labor gain from Liberal		Swing	+3.0	

=== Kooyong ===
1914 Australian federal election: Kooyong
Party	Candidate	Votes	%	±%
Liberal	Sir Robert Best	18,545	59.4	−2.5
Independent Socialist	Vida Goldstein	10,264	32.9	−5.2
Independent	Edward Terry	2,420	7.7	+7.7
Total formal votes		31,229	98.0	
Informal votes		636	2.0	
Turnout		31,865	76.3	
Liberal hold		Swing	+1.4	

=== Maribyrnong ===
1914 Australian federal election: Maribyrnong
Party	Candidate	Votes	%	±%
Labor	James Fenton	20,834	64.3	+3.5
Liberal	Edward Reynolds	11,574	35.7	−3.5
Total formal votes		32,408	98.2	
Informal votes		583	1.8	
Turnout		32,991	72.4	
Labor hold		Swing	+3.5	

=== Melbourne ===
1914 Australian federal election: Melbourne
Party	Candidate	Votes	%	±%
Labor	William Maloney	18,471	69.3	−2.6
Liberal	Wilfrid Kent Hughes	8,194	30.7	+30.7
Total formal votes		26,665	97.1	
Informal votes		807	2.9	
Turnout		27,472	72.9	
Labor hold		Swing	−2.6	

=== Melbourne Ports ===
1914 Australian federal election: Melbourne Ports
Party	Candidate	Votes	%	±%
Labor	James Mathews	unopposed		
Labor hold		Swing		

=== Wannon ===
1914 Australian federal election: Wannon
Party	Candidate	Votes	%	±%
Liberal	Arthur Rodgers	16,079	53.6	−0.6
Labor	Neil Mackinnon	13,902	46.4	+0.6
Total formal votes		29,981	98.4	
Informal votes		480	1.6	
Turnout		30,461	85.9	
Liberal hold		Swing	−0.6	

=== Wimmera ===
1914 Australian federal election: Wimmera
Party	Candidate	Votes	%	±%
Liberal	Sydney Sampson	unopposed		
Liberal hold		Swing		

=== Yarra ===
1914 Australian federal election: Yarra
Party	Candidate	Votes	%	±%
Labor	Frank Tudor	unopposed		
Labor hold		Swing		

== Queensland ==
=== Brisbane ===
1914 Australian federal election: Brisbane
Party	Candidate	Votes	%	±%
Labor	William Finlayson	18,743	60.3	+3.4
Liberal	John Lackey	12,353	39.7	−3.4
Total formal votes		31,096	97.5	
Informal votes		809	2.5	
Turnout		31,905	74.7	
Labor hold		Swing	+3.4	

=== Capricornia ===
1914 Australian federal election: Capricornia
Party	Candidate	Votes	%	±%
Labor	William Higgs	15,475	67.4	+3.3
Liberal	Neal Macrossan	7,489	32.6	−3.3
Total formal votes		22,964	97.0	
Informal votes		700	3.0	
Turnout		23,664	70.9	
Labor hold		Swing	+3.3	

=== Darling Downs ===
1914 Australian federal election: Darling Downs
Party	Candidate	Votes	%	±%
Liberal	Littleton Groom	15,148	56.9	−3.1
Labor	Paul Bauers	11,495	43.1	+3.1
Total formal votes		26,643	96.7	
Informal votes		914	3.3	
Turnout		27,557	78.0	
Liberal hold		Swing	−3.1	

=== Herbert ===
1914 Australian federal election: Herbert
Party	Candidate	Votes	%	±%
Labor	Fred Bamford	18,700	64.4	+6.4
Liberal	Frank Fraser	10,350	35.6	−6.4
Total formal votes		29,050	97.2	
Informal votes		829	2.8	
Turnout		29,879	74.2	
Labor hold		Swing	+6.4	

=== Kennedy ===
1914 Australian federal election: Kennedy
Party	Candidate	Votes	%	±%
Labor	Charles McDonald	unopposed		
Labor hold		Swing		

=== Lilley ===
1914 Australian federal election: Lilley
Party	Candidate	Votes	%	±%
Liberal	Jacob Stumm	15,475	52.3	−2.4
Labor	Arthur Lilley	14,102	47.7	+2.4
Total formal votes		29,577	97.7	
Informal votes		705	2.3	
Turnout		30,282	77.6	
Liberal hold		Swing	−2.4	

=== Maranoa ===
1914 Australian federal election: Maranoa
Party	Candidate	Votes	%	±%
Labor	Jim Page	unopposed		
Labor hold		Swing		

=== Moreton ===
1914 Australian federal election: Moreton
Party	Candidate	Votes	%	±%
Liberal	Hugh Sinclair	15,811	57.3	−3.4
Labor	John Sherlock	11,774	42.7	+3.4
Total formal votes		27,585	97.6	
Informal votes		667	2.4	
Turnout		28,252	77.8	
Liberal hold		Swing	−3.4	

=== Oxley ===
1914 Australian federal election: Oxley
Party	Candidate	Votes	%	±%
Labor	James Sharpe	18,234	56.8	+2.4
Liberal	James Bayley	13,841	43.2	−2.4
Total formal votes		32,075	97.6	
Informal votes		805	2.4	
Turnout		32,880	79.2	
Labor hold		Swing	+2.4	

=== Wide Bay ===
1914 Australian federal election: Wide Bay
Party	Candidate	Votes	%	±%
Labor	Andrew Fisher	16,494	64.3	+8.7
Queensland Farmers	John Austin	9,155	35.7	+35.7
Total formal votes		25,649	97.0	
Informal votes		788	3.0	
Turnout		26,437	78.1	
Labor hold		Swing	+8.7	

== South Australia ==
=== Adelaide ===
1914 Australian federal election: Adelaide
Party	Candidate	Votes	%	±%
Labor	George Edwin Yates	16,762	66.4	+0.3
Liberal	Walter Hamilton	8,461	33.5	+4.1
Total formal votes		25,223	97.6	
Informal votes		612	2.4	
Turnout		25,835	73.3	
Labor hold		Swing	−2.0	

=== Angas ===
1914 Australian federal election: Angas
Party	Candidate	Votes	%	±%
Liberal	Paddy Glynn	unopposed		
Liberal hold		Swing		

=== Barker ===
1914 Australian federal election: Barker
Party	Candidate	Votes	%	±%
Liberal	John Livingston	16,866	56.7	−2.3
Labor	William Sampson	12,876	43.3	+2.3
Total formal votes		29,742	97.3	
Informal votes		814	2.7	
Turnout		30,556	81.7	
Liberal hold		Swing	−2.3	

=== Boothby ===
1914 Australian federal election: Boothby
Party	Candidate	Votes	%	±%
Labor	George Dankel	18,822	55.3	+2.3
Liberal	Samuel Hunt	15,227	44.7	−2.3
Total formal votes		34,049	97.8	
Informal votes		755	2.2	
Turnout		34,804	81.8	
Labor hold		Swing	+2.3	

=== Grey ===
1914 Australian federal election: Grey
Party	Candidate	Votes	%	±%
Labor	Alexander Poynton	14,218	54.0	+2.0
Liberal	William Morrow	12,116	46.0	−2.0
Total formal votes		26,334	97.9	
Informal votes		565	2.1	
Turnout		26,899	80.3	
Labor hold		Swing	+2.0	

=== Hindmarsh ===
1914 Australian federal election: Hindmarsh
Party	Candidate	Votes	%	±%
Labor	William Archibald	25,913	74.4	−25.6
Liberal	James Craig	8,895	25.6	+25.6
Total formal votes		34,808	97.6	
Informal votes		839	2.4	
Turnout		35,647	77.8	
Labor hold		Swing	−25.6	

=== Wakefield ===
1914 Australian federal election: Wakefield
Party	Candidate	Votes	%	±%
Liberal	Richard Foster	14,505	52.4	−1.3
Labor	William Harvey	13,197	47.6	+1.3
Total formal votes		27,702	97.6	
Informal votes		695	2.4	
Turnout		28,397	84.7	
Liberal hold		Swing	−1.3	

== Western Australia ==
=== Dampier ===
1914 Australian federal election: Dampier
Party	Candidate	Votes	%	±%
Liberal	Henry Gregory	12,817	53.9	+1.3
Labor	Patrick Coffey	10,941	46.1	−1.3
Total formal votes		23,758	95.9	
Informal votes		1,007	4.1	
Turnout		24,765	68.9	
Liberal hold		Swing	+1.3	

=== Fremantle ===
1914 Australian federal election: Fremantle
Party	Candidate	Votes	%	±%
Labor	Reginald Burchell	16,385	56.3	+0.5
Liberal	Thomas Briggs	12,705	43.7	−0.5
Total formal votes		29,090	96.9	
Informal votes		937	3.1	
Turnout		30,027	77.1	
Labor hold		Swing	+0.5	

=== Kalgoorlie ===
1914 Australian federal election: Kalgoorlie
Party	Candidate	Votes	%	±%
Labor	Hugh Mahon	unopposed		
Labor hold		Swing		

=== Perth ===
1914 Australian federal election: Perth
Party	Candidate	Votes	%	±%
Liberal	James Fowler	15,256	55.8	+2.5
Labor	Alick McCallum	12,071	44.2	−2.5
Total formal votes		27,327	97.0	
Informal votes		836	3.0	
Turnout		28,163	67.7	
Liberal hold		Swing	+2.5	

=== Swan ===
1914 Australian federal election: Swan
Party	Candidate	Votes	%	±%
Liberal	Sir John Forrest	15,950	59.2	+4.3
Labor	Walter Peters	10,985	40.8	−4.3
Total formal votes		26,935	97.2	
Informal votes		787	2.8	
Turnout		27,722	72.8	
Liberal hold		Swing	+4.3	

== Tasmania ==
=== Bass ===
1914 Australian federal election: Bass
Party	Candidate	Votes	%	±%
Labor	Jens Jensen	9,731	56.0	+3.6
Liberal	Alexander Marshall	7,638	44.0	−3.6
Total formal votes		17,369	98.5	
Informal votes		270	1.5	
Turnout		17,639	79.0	
Labor hold		Swing	+3.6	

=== Darwin ===
1914 Australian federal election: Darwin
Party	Candidate	Votes	%	±%
Labor	King O'Malley	8,585	56.1	+4.0
Liberal	Ernest Plummer	6,723	43.9	−4.0
Total formal votes		15,308	97.8	
Informal votes		340	2.2	
Turnout		15,648	78.6	
Labor hold		Swing	+4.0	

=== Denison ===
1914 Australian federal election: Denison
Party	Candidate	Votes	%	±%
Labor	William Laird Smith	9,752	55.9	+3.4
Liberal	Arthur Clerke	7,701	44.1	−1.9
Total formal votes		17,453	97.0	
Informal votes		535	3.0	
Turnout		17,988	77.5	
Labor hold		Swing	+2.6	

=== Franklin ===
1914 Australian federal election: Franklin
Party	Candidate	Votes	%	±%
Liberal	William McWilliams	unopposed		
Liberal hold		Swing		

=== Wilmot ===
1914 Australian federal election: Wilmot
Party	Candidate	Votes	%	±%
Liberal	Llewellyn Atkinson	8,169	60.9	−1.7
Labor	Henry McFie	5,255	39.1	+1.7
Total formal votes		13,424	97.1	
Informal votes		404	2.9	
Turnout		13,828	74.0	
Liberal hold		Swing	−1.7	

== See also ==
- Candidates of the 1914 Australian federal election
- Members of the Australian House of Representatives, 1914–1917
- Results of the 1914 Australian federal election (Senate)
