= William Shoobridge =

Australian politician

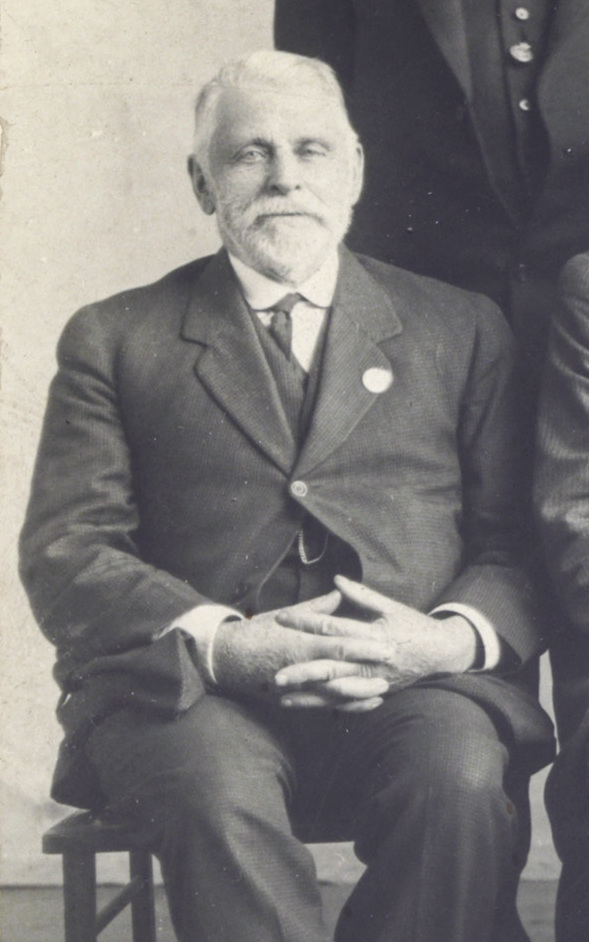
William Shoobridge (ca. 1926)

William Ebenezer Shoobridge (7 January 1846 – 17 May 1940) was an Australian politician. He was born in Richmond, Van Diemen's Land. He unsuccessfully contested the 1910 and 1913 elections for the federal seat of Franklin as a Labor candidate. He narrowly missed election at the 1914 Senate election. In 1916 he was elected to the Tasmanian House of Assembly as a Labor member for Franklin. He served until he was defeated in 1919. He was re-elected in a recount in 1922 and in 1925 switched seats to Wilmot. He was defeated again in 1928 but returned for a final term from 1929 to 1931. He resigned from the Labor Party in 1932. Shoobridge died in Hobart in 1940. His father Ebenezer Shoobridge, brother Louis Shoobridge Sr. and nephew Rupert Shoobridge were all members of the Tasmanian Parliament.
