= Joseph Hannan =

Australian politician (1873–1843)

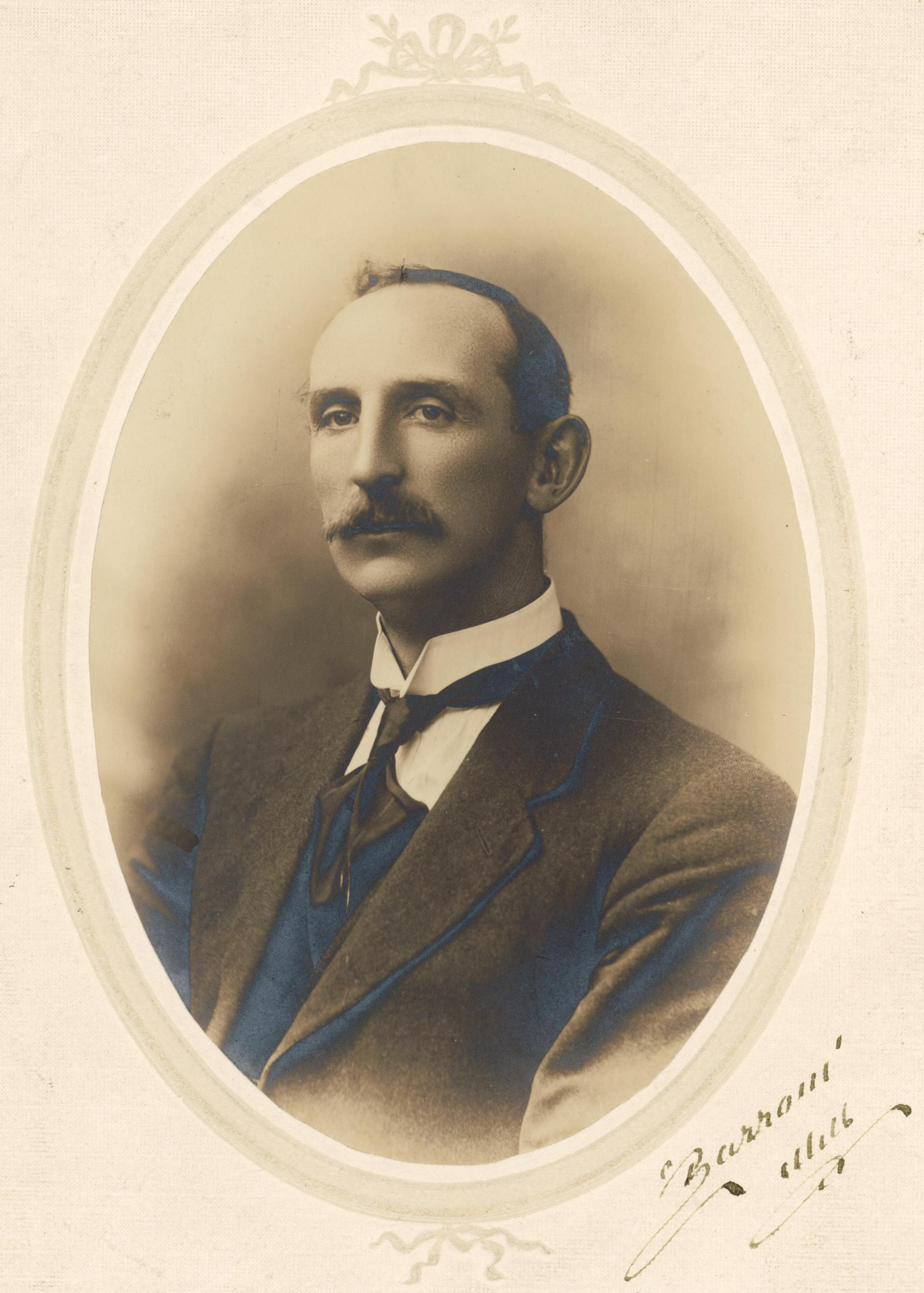

Member of the Australian Parliament for Fawkner
- In office 31 May 1913 – 5 May 1917
- Preceded by: George Fairbairn
- Succeeded by: George Maxwell

Senator for Victoria
- In office 22 July 1924 – 13 November 1925
- Preceded by: Stephen Barker
- Succeeded by: David Andrew

Personal details
- Born: c. 1875 Yorkshire, England
- Died: 14 March 1943 (aged 67–68) Black Rock, Victoria, Australia
- Party: Labor
- Spouse: Agnes Phelan (m. 1903)
- Occupation: Foundry worker

Joseph Francis Hannan (c. 1875 – 14 March 1943) was an Australian trade unionist and politician. He was a member of the Australian Labor Party (ALP) and served terms in the House of Representatives (1913–1917), Victorian Legislative Assembly (1918–1919), and as a Senator for Victoria (1924–1925). He was federal president of the ALP from 1924 to 1927 and was a senior officeholder in the Melbourne Trades Hall Council.

== Early life ==
Hannan was born around 1875, probably in Yorkshire, England. He was the son of Jane (née Hay) and James Hannan, who were originally from Scotland. He and his family immigrated to Australia around 1888.

After a period of two years working as a stablehand, Hannan joined his father in working as a pipe-moulder, involved in the manufacture of pipes. In 1907, during the Harvester case, he testified that "prior to being engaged as a pipe-moulder he had worked as a labourer, a pot-man and afterwards a headman", including for Robison Bros. & Co. in Melbourne as an iron-dresser finishing off metal castings.

== Union movement ==
Hannan was secretary of the Iron Foundries Employees' Union and was associated with various other unions including the Fuel and Fodder Trades Union, the Marine Stewards' and Pantrymen's Association, the Coopers' Trades Union, and the Cycle Trades' Union. He was a delegate to the Melbourne Trades Hall Council from the late 1890s and served for periods as a vice-president (1912–1913), president (1913–1914) and assistant secretary (1920–1924).

== Politics ==
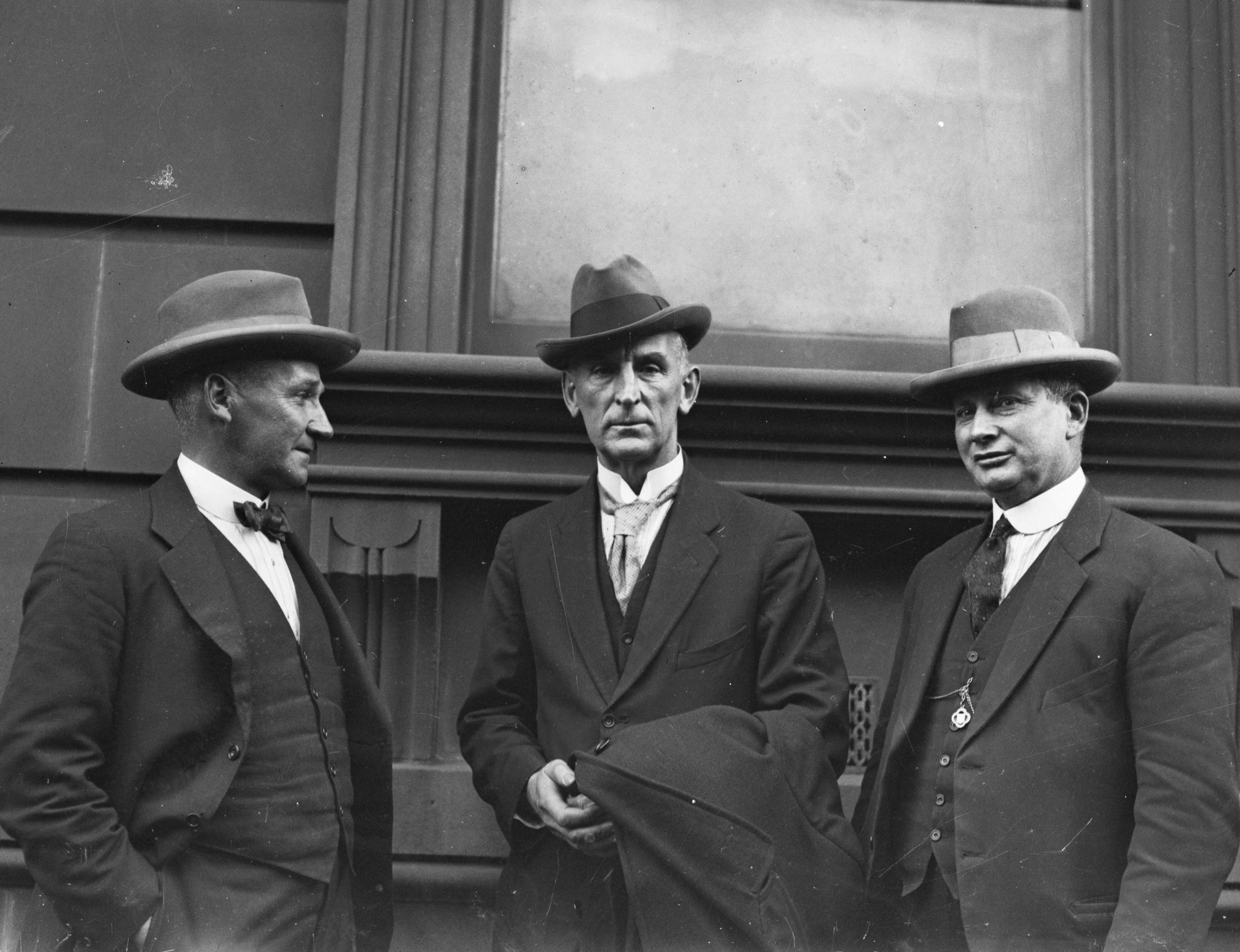
Hannan (centre) in 1927 with ALP officials Lewis McDonald (left) and Daniel McNamara (right)

In 1900, Hannan was involved in the creation of the Political Labor Council of Victoria, the predecessor of the modern Australian Labor Party (Victorian Branch). He was a long-serving member of the ALP state executive and served as state president in 1911. He was a delegate to six ALP federal conferences between 1905 and 1927, including as chairman of the 1927 conference. He was federal president of the ALP from 1924 to 1928.

Hannan was considered a moderate within the ALP and regarded the socialist objective as an electoral liability that would "hang like a millstone around the neck of the Movement". He was anti-communist but supported free speech for communists and their right to organise, including during the debate on the Bruce–Page government's contentious Peace Officers Act 1925. He was also an avowed pacifist and advocate for disarmament, stating that "not until the parliaments of the world are under the control of the workers or their representatives are we likely to have peace"

=== Parliamentary politics ===
Hannan stood unsuccessfully against George Fairbairn for the seat of Fawkner at the 1910 election, but defeated him at the 1913 election. He remained loyal to the ALP during the ALP split of 1916 but lost the seat at the 1917 election, due to his opposition to conscription. In 1918 he won a by-election for the Victorian Legislative Assembly seat of Albert Park, but resigned in 1919 to unsuccessfully contest Fawkner at the 1919 election.

In 1924, Hannan was appointed to fill a casual vacancy in the Senate, but was not returned at the 1925 election. He also unsuccessfully contested the assembly seat of Castlemaine and Kyneton in 1927 and Albert Park in 1932, and stood for the Federal seats of Kooyong the 1928 election and Flinders at the 1934 election without success.

== Personal life ==
In 1903, Hannan married Agnes Phelan, with whom he had four children. After leaving politics he worked as a commercial traveller and served as vice-president of the South Melbourne Districts Football Club. He died on 14 March 1943 in Black Rock, Victoria, having been predeceased by his wife and one of his daughters.

Hannan is buried in the Roman Catholic section of Coburg Cemetery with his wife, daughter Veronica and two infant grandsons. His grave is included in a self-guided heritage walk at the cemetery and information about his life is available on a sign posted at his graveside.

== Notes ==
Parliament of Australia
Preceded by George Fairbairn	Member for Fawkner; 1913 – 1917	Succeeded by George Maxwell
