= John Keating (Australian politician) =

Australian politician

The Honourable John Keating
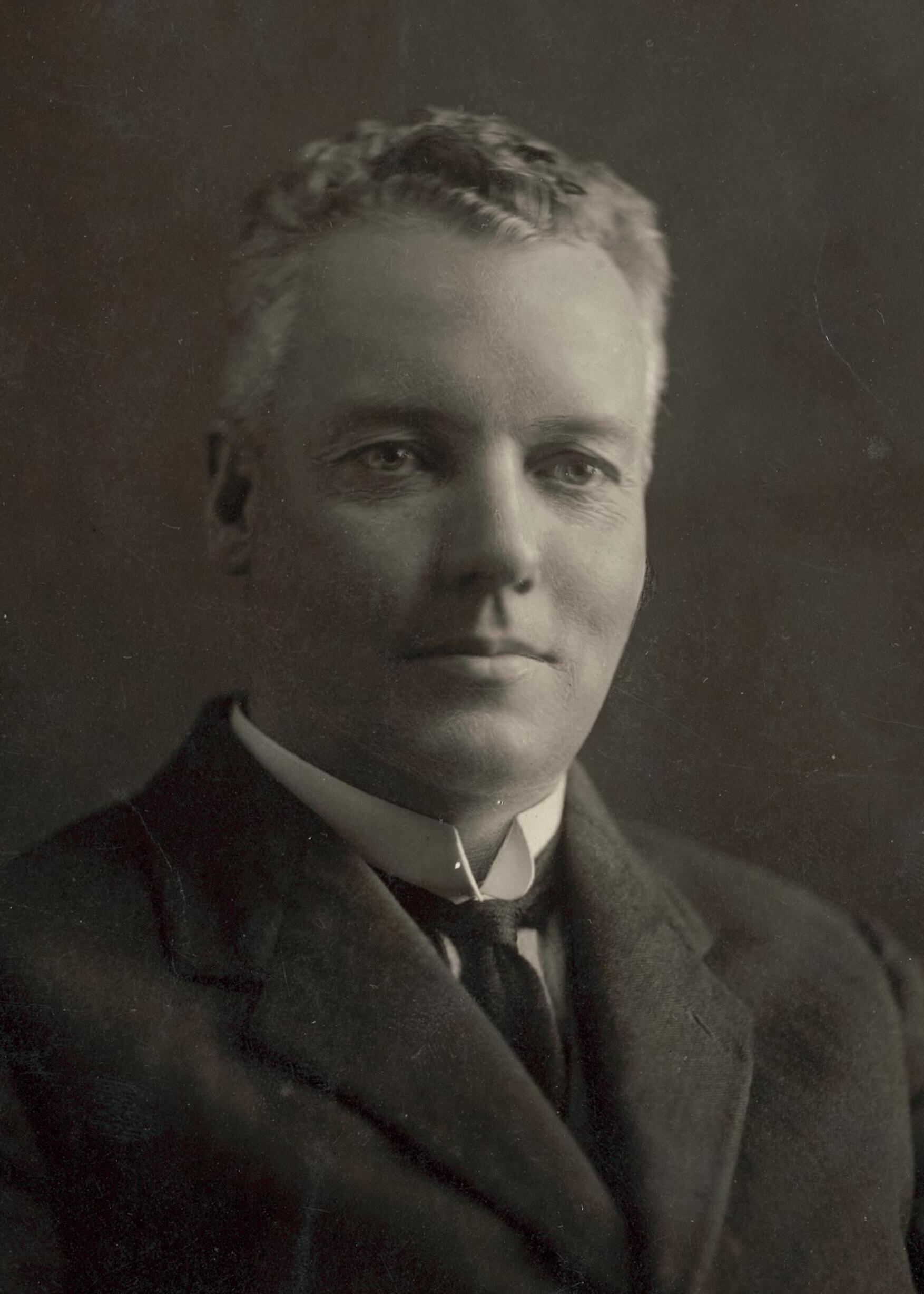

Minister for Home Affairs
- In office 30 July 1907 – 13 November 1908
- Prime Minister: Alfred Deakin
- Preceded by: Thomas Ewing
- Succeeded by: Robert Best

Vice-President of the Executive Council
- In office 12 October 1906 – 30 July 1907
- Prime Minister: Alfred Deakin
- Preceded by: Thomas Ewing
- Succeeded by: Hugh Mahon

Senator for Tasmania
- In office 29 March 1901 – 30 June 1923

Personal details
- Born: 28 June 1872 Hobart, Tasmania
- Died: 31 October 1940 (aged 68) Melbourne, Victoria
- Party: Protectionist (1901–09); Liberal (1909–17); Nationalist (1917–23)
- Spouse: Sarah Alice Monks
- Occupation: Solicitor

John Henry Keating (28 June 1872 – 31 October 1940) was an Australian politician who served as a Senator for Tasmania from 1901 to 1923. He held ministerial office in Alfred Deakin's second government, serving as Vice-President of the Executive Council (1906–1907) and Minister for Home Affairs (1907–1908).

== Early life ==
Keating was born in Hobart on 28 June 1872. He was the son of Mary (née Cronley) and James Keating; his father was a carpenter and furniture-maker.

Keating was educated in Hobart at Officer College and in Sydney at St Ignatius' College, Riverview. He was awarded an Associate of Arts degree by the Tasmanian Council for Education in 1890, and went on to become one of the University of Tasmania's first law graduates in 1896. Keating was admitted as a barrister in August 1894 and established a practice in Lefroy. After two years he moved to Launceston. He was an officeholder in the Australian Natives' Association and a secretary and organiser for the Northern Tasmanian Federation League.

== Political career ==
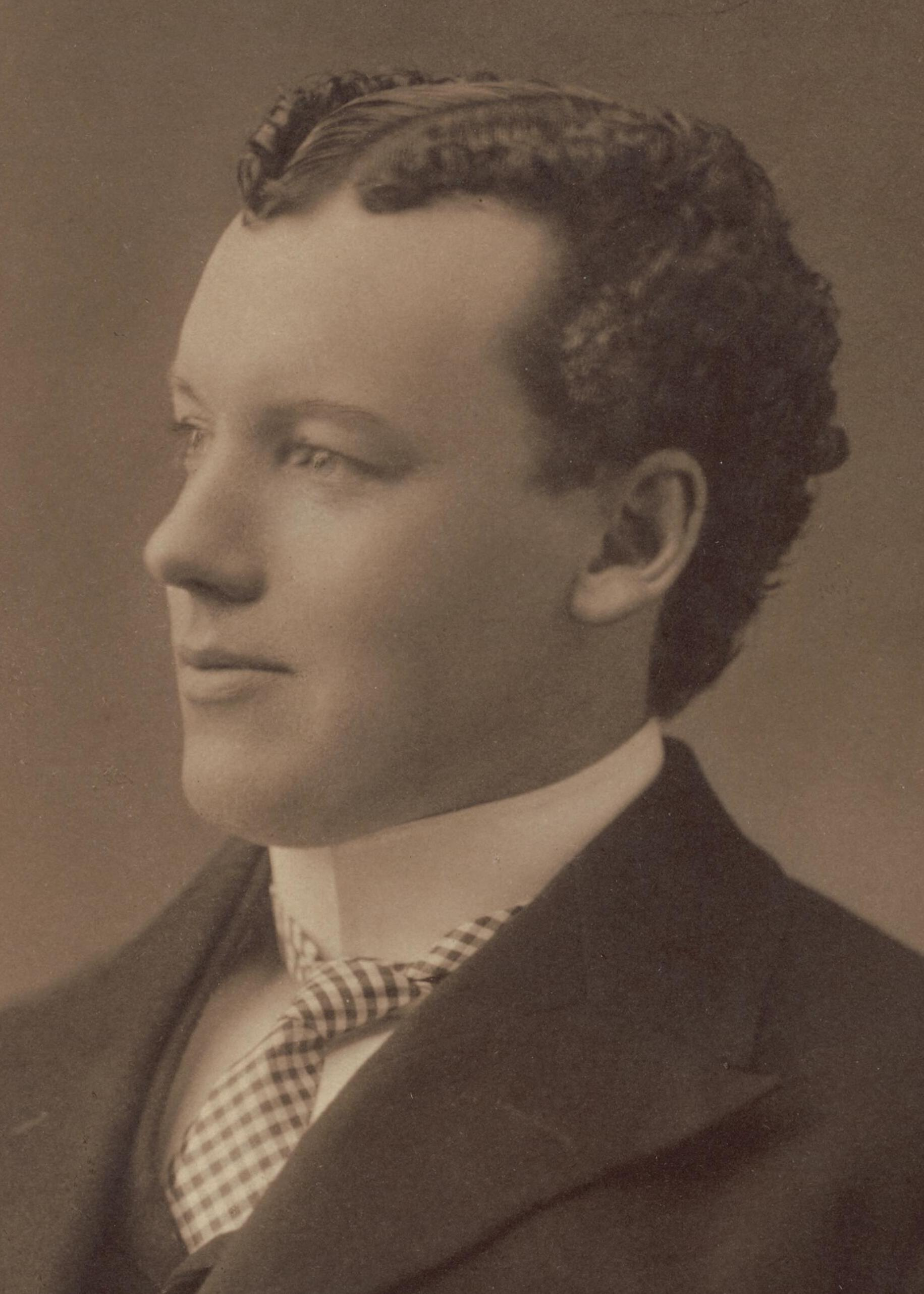
A young Keating

Keating stood unsuccessfully for the Tasmanian House of Assembly seat of George Town in 1900. In the 1901 election, he was elected to the Australian Senate as the youngest member of the Parliament, where he supported the Protectionist Party governments of Edmund Barton and Alfred Deakin. He supported the establishment of a system of compulsory conciliation and arbitration a Commonwealth old-age pension scheme and a White Australia. He was appointed an honorary minister in the second Deakin Ministry in July 1905 and Vice-President of the Executive Council in October 1906. He was responsible for the drafting of the 1905 Copyright Act.

Keating was Minister for Home Affairs from January 1907 to November 1908 and was responsible for passing a bill to provide bounties to assist industry and a bill to establish the Commonwealth quarantine service. He sat on the backbench during Deakin's Fusion government. Although he fully supported Australia's participation in World War I, he voted to force the Hughes government to an election in 1917 in protest at Hughes' manoeuvering to have the Tasmanian Government replace Labor Senator Rudolph Ready—who had been forced by ill-health to resign—with the Nationalist John Earle, thus gaining control of the Senate.

== Later life ==
Keating failed to win re-election as a Nationalist at the 1922 election and returned to his legal practice. His wife died in October 1939 and he died a year later of the effects of a duodenal ulcer, survived by a son and a daughter. He was the last surviving member of Alfred Deakin's 1906-1907 Cabinet.

== Personal life ==
Keating married Sarah Alice "Lallie" Monks in 1906, with whom he had two children. He died in Melbourne on 31 October 1940 from the effects of a duodenal ulcer. He had been widowed the previous year.

== Notes ==
Political offices
Preceded by Thomas Ewing	Vice-President of the Executive Council; 1906–1907	Succeeded by Robert Best
Preceded by Thomas Ewing	Minister for Home Affairs; 1907–1908	Succeeded by Hugh Mahon
