= Albert Blakey =

Australian politician

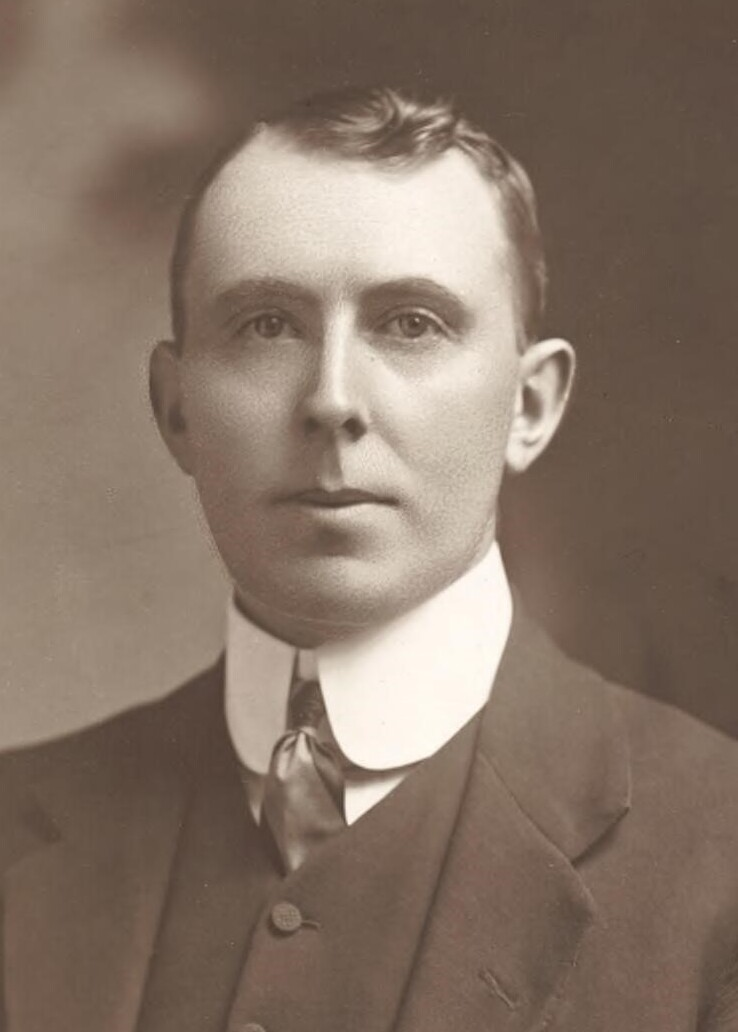
- Blakey in 1912

Senator for Victoria
- In office 1 July 1910 – 30 June 1917

Personal details
- Born: 9 November 1879 Balmoral, Victoria, Australia
- Died: 4 July 1935 (aged 55) Mooroopna, Victoria, Australia
- Party: Labor
- Spouse: Elsie Hines (m. 1912)
- Occupation: Clerk

Albert Edward Howarth Blakey (9 November 1879 – 4 July 1935) was an Australian politician. He was a member of the Australian Labor Party (ALP) and served as a Senator for Victoria from 1910 to 1917.

== Early life ==
Blakey was born on 9 November 1879 in Balmoral, Victoria. He was the son of Louise (née Woodford) and William Henry Blakey. His father worked as a fellmonger and woolclasser.

After leaving school, Blakey was apprenticed to a civil engineer for a period. He settled in Hamilton where he worked as a clerk for a stock and land agency associated with Alfred Tennyson Dickens. Blakey was active in the labour movement from a young age as an early member of the Victorian Clerks' Union. He was a senior vice-president of the Australian Natives' Association and an unsuccessful candidate for the presidency in 1917.

== Politics ==
Blakey became secretary of the Hamilton branch of the Political Labor Council in 1906. He was a delegate to state conferences from 1907 and served on the central executive from 1908 to 1910. He stood for the Victorian Legislative Assembly at the 1907 and 1908 state elections, running unsuccessfully in the seat of Dundas.

At the 1910 federal election, Blakey was elected to a six-year Senate term standing on the ALP ticket in Victoria. His first term was cut short by a double dissolution and at the 1914 election he was re-elected to a shorter three-year term. Blakey was defeated for re-election at the 1917 election. He had remained loyal to the ALP during the 1916 split over conscription.

Blakey identified as a "Labor moderate" and stated that he would not be bound by caucus decisions although he was committed to the ALP platform. He was critical of the Fisher government on a number of occasions, including in relation to protection of public servants, government spending on rural areas, and expenditure on the development of the new national capital Canberra. In his maiden speech he supported "land settlement and land tax, compulsory military training, invalid pensions and the lowering of the age at which women were eligible for old-age pensions"; he also favoured development of the Northern Territory and Territory of Papua, though only using white labour. In parliament, Blakey served on the Joint Statutory Committee on Public Accounts from 1914 to 1917. He also served on the select committee inquiring into the dismissal of Trans-Australian Railway engineer Henry Chinn and supported its recommendation for his reinstatement.

After his defeat Blakey moved to Hobart, Tasmania, to work for The World, a labour-affiliated newspaper. He later returned to Victoria and stood unsuccessfully for re-election to the Senate at the 1925 and 1928 elections. The Age called him a good platform speaker and referred to his genial personality. Punch observed in 1912 that "no man who stood for the Senate was better known all over Victoria, and everywhere his reputation was the same as in Hamilton—that of a straight, courteous, conscientious man, who could be trusted to do his best for the country".

== Personal life ==
In 1912, Blakey married Elsie Hines, with whom he had one son. After his parliamentary defeat, he joined Victorian Railways and worked in the newspaper-selling department and as a timekeeper in the Goulburn Valley.

Blakey died on 4 July 1935 in Mooroopna, Victoria, following a long illness.
