= Stephen Barker (politician) =

Australian politician (1846–1924)

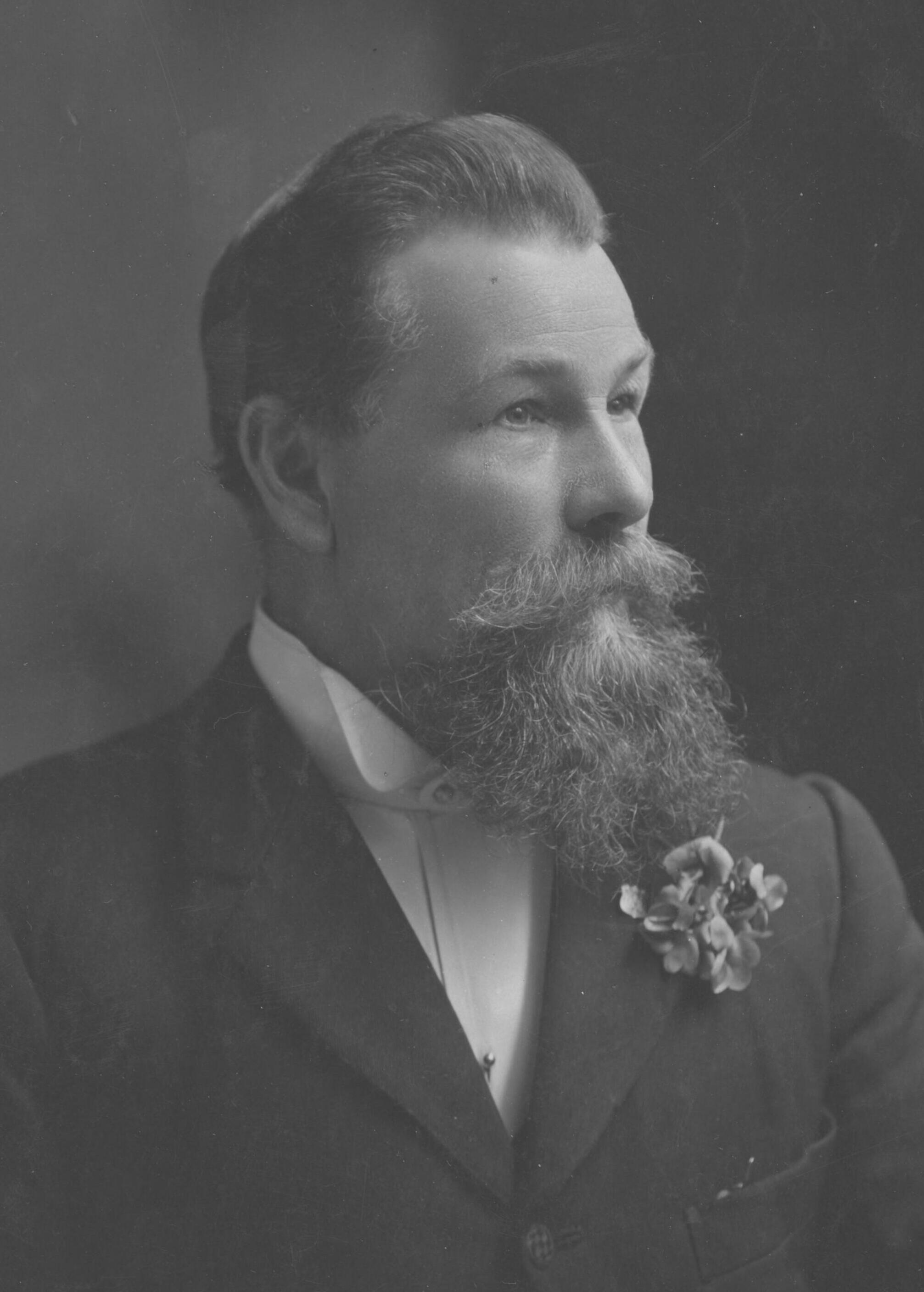
- Barker, c. 1895

Senator for Victoria
- In office 1 July 1910 – 30 June 1920
- In office 1 July 1923 – 21 June 1924
- Succeeded by: Joseph Hannan

Personal details
- Born: 1846 London, England
- Died: 21 June 1924 (aged 77–78) Toorak, Victoria, Australia
- Party: Labor
- Spouse: Jane Laughton (m. 1874; died 1914)
- Occupation: Tailor, unionist

Stephen Barker (1846 – 21 June 1924) was an Australian trade unionist and politician. Born in Sussex, he received a primary education before becoming a tailor. He migrated to Australia where he became an organiser of the Tramways Union. He served as secretary of the Melbourne Trades Hall Council from 1901 to 1910. In 1910, he was elected to the Australian Senate as a Labor Senator from Victoria. He was defeated in 1919 but re-elected in 1922. However, he died in 1924, and Joseph Hannan was appointed as his replacement.

== Early life ==
Barker was born in 1846, in London, to Hannah (née Nagle) and Stephen Barker; his father was a farmer. The family immigrated to Australia when he was a child, settling in the colony of Victoria.

Barker entered the workforce at the age of twelve, working in the clothing industry as a presser. He worked for a clothing manufacturers Sargood, Son & Co. and Sahlberg & Son in Melbourne, later spending time in the wholesale and retail clothing trades in Launceston, Tasmania, and in Auckland and Wellington, New Zealand. He had returned to Australia by the 1870s where he worked for Beath, Schiess & Co. and Barthold & Co., later establishing his own small business in North Melbourne as a tailor and dyer.

== Labour movement ==
In Melbourne, Barker was an early member of the Pressers' Society and later a founding member of the Tailors' Union and the Victorian Clothing Operatives' Union. He played a major role in the revitalisation of the Pressers' Union in the 1890s, serving terms as its president and secretary as well as delegate to the Melbourne Trades Hall Council from 1892 to 1902. He was president of the Trades Hall Council from 1897 to 1898 and a strong advocate for wage boards, helping establish them across 60 industries.

== Politics ==
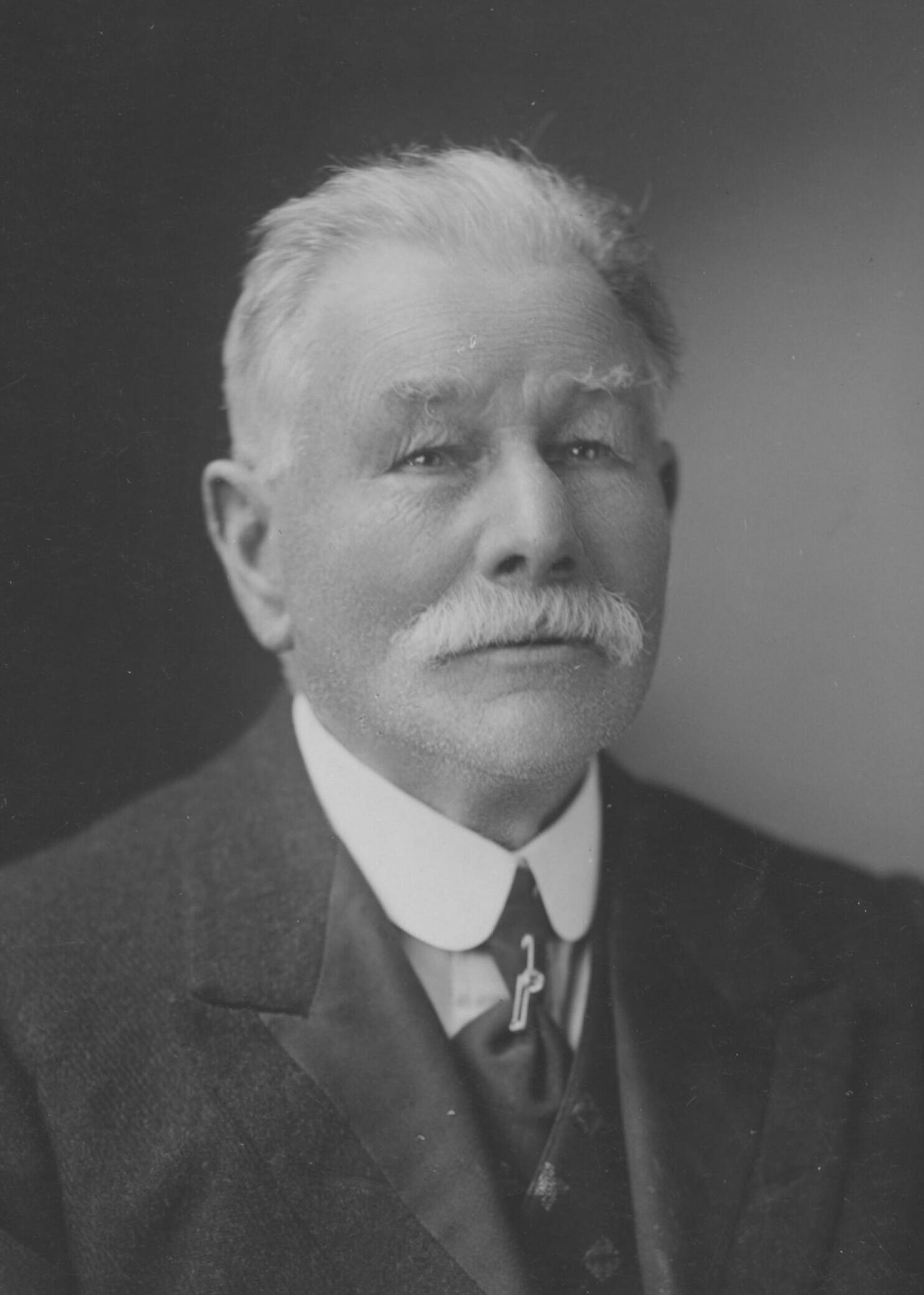
Barker, c. 1920

Barker was an unsuccessful candidate for the seat of North Melbourne at the 1897 Victorian general election, losing to William Watt. He was elected to the North Melbourne Town Council in 1901 and served as its final mayor for a brief period in 1905, prior to the town's annexation to the City of Melbourne.

In 1902, Barker was a "principal mover" in the formation of the Political Labor Council, becoming secretary the following year. He was elected to the Senate in the Australian Labor Party's landslide victory at the 1910 federal election, having previously stood unsuccessfully at the 1901, 1903, and 1906 elections.

In parliament, Barker supported the ALP platform and was vocal in his support for the New Protection and union preference. He was a "staunch anti-conscriptionist", remaining loyal during the ALP split over conscription. In 1916, he visited England with the Empire Parliamentary Association and toured the Western Front, where he "had experience of firing a shell at the Germans". Re-elected in 1914 following a double dissolution, Barker was defeated at the 1919 election. Despite his age, he reprised his candidacy at the 1922 election and defeated high-profile Nationalist candidate George Swinburne. In 1924, he joined a parliamentary delegation to the Territory of New Guinea.

== Personal life ==
Barker married Jane Laughton in 1874, with whom he had seven children. They initially lived in Richmond and later moved to St Kilda East, where he was "surrounded by his extensive collection of books, curios and pictures". He also had a holiday home at Carrum.

Barker was widowed in 1914, and was predeceased by two of his children. He died on 21 June 1924, aged 77 or 78, at Statenboro Private Hospital in Toorak, following complications of influenza. He was interred at Brighton General Cemetery.
