= George Henderson (Australian politician) =

English-born Australian coal miner, trade unionist and politician

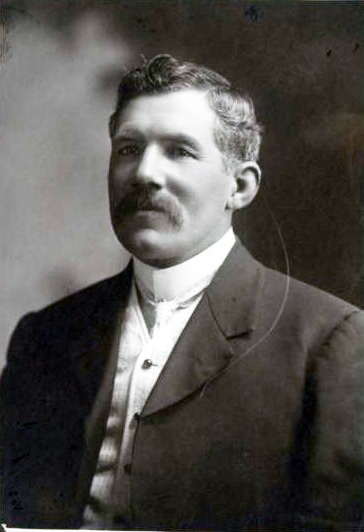

Senator for Western Australia
- In office 1 April 1904 – 30 June 1923

Personal details
- Born: 19 August 1857 Bedlington, Northumberland, England
- Died: 21 January 1933 (aged 75) Willoughby, New South Wales, Australia
- Party: Labor (1904–1917) Nationalist (1917–1923)
- Spouse: Annie Veitch (m. 1885; d. 1912)
- Children: One son and two daughters
- Occupation: Politician, coal miner, trade unionist

Christopher George Henderson (19 August 1857 – 21 January 1933), commonly known as George Henderson, was an English-born Australian coal miner, trade unionist and politician. He served as a Senator for Western Australia from 1904 to 1923, initially for the Australian Labor Party before joining the Nationalist Party of Australia following the 1916 conscription split. He was Chairman of Committees in the Senate from 1914 to 1917.

== Early life ==
Henderson was born on 19 August 1857 at Bedlington, Northumberland, England, the son of George Henderson (an agricultural labourer originally from Rothesay, Scotland) and Jane, née Short. He received a primary education at a school in Newcastle-on-Tyne and began work in a local coal mine in 1869–1870, later continuing his education at the Miners’ Hall while working as a miner in Newcastle. On 10 January 1885, he married Annie Veitch at Holy Cross Church, Ryton, County Durham. The couple migrated to the Colony of New South Wales in October 1885.

== Early career ==
In New South Wales, Henderson worked as a coal miner in the Illawarra region. From 1891 to 1899 he served as secretary (and later general secretary) of the Illawarra Miners Union. In 1893 he led an unsuccessful strike against a proposed reduction in miners' rates. He was also a laypreacher. He moved to Collie in 1900 with his family. Henderson worked as a coal miner and became manager of the Wallsend Coal Mine. He then became the general secretary of the Collie River Miners’ Association. He also was as a founding member of the Collie Progress Committee and as a councillor on the Collie Municipal Council from 1902 to 1904. In 1910 he was appointed a justice of the peace.

== Federal political career ==
In 1903, Henderson was elected to the Australian Senate as a Labor senator for Western Australia, with his term beginning on 1 April 1904. He was re-elected in 1910, 1914 and 1917. He served as Chairman of Committees from 1914 to 1917. During World War I, he was one of five Western Australian Labor senators who supported the introduction of conscription for overseas military service. Following the 1916 Labor Party split over conscription, he joined the National Labor Party and then the Nationalist Party of Australia. He continued as a Nationalist senator and was a member of the Public Works Committee. Henderson was defeated at the 1922 federal election and his term ended on 30 June 1923.

== Later life and death ==
After leaving parliament, Henderson worked in real estate and as a farmer. His wife Annie died in 1912. The couple had one son and two daughters. He died on 21 January 1933 at Willoughby, New South Wales, aged 75. He is buried in the Northern Suburbs Cemetery, Sydney.
