= Rudolph Ready =

Australian politician (1878–1958)

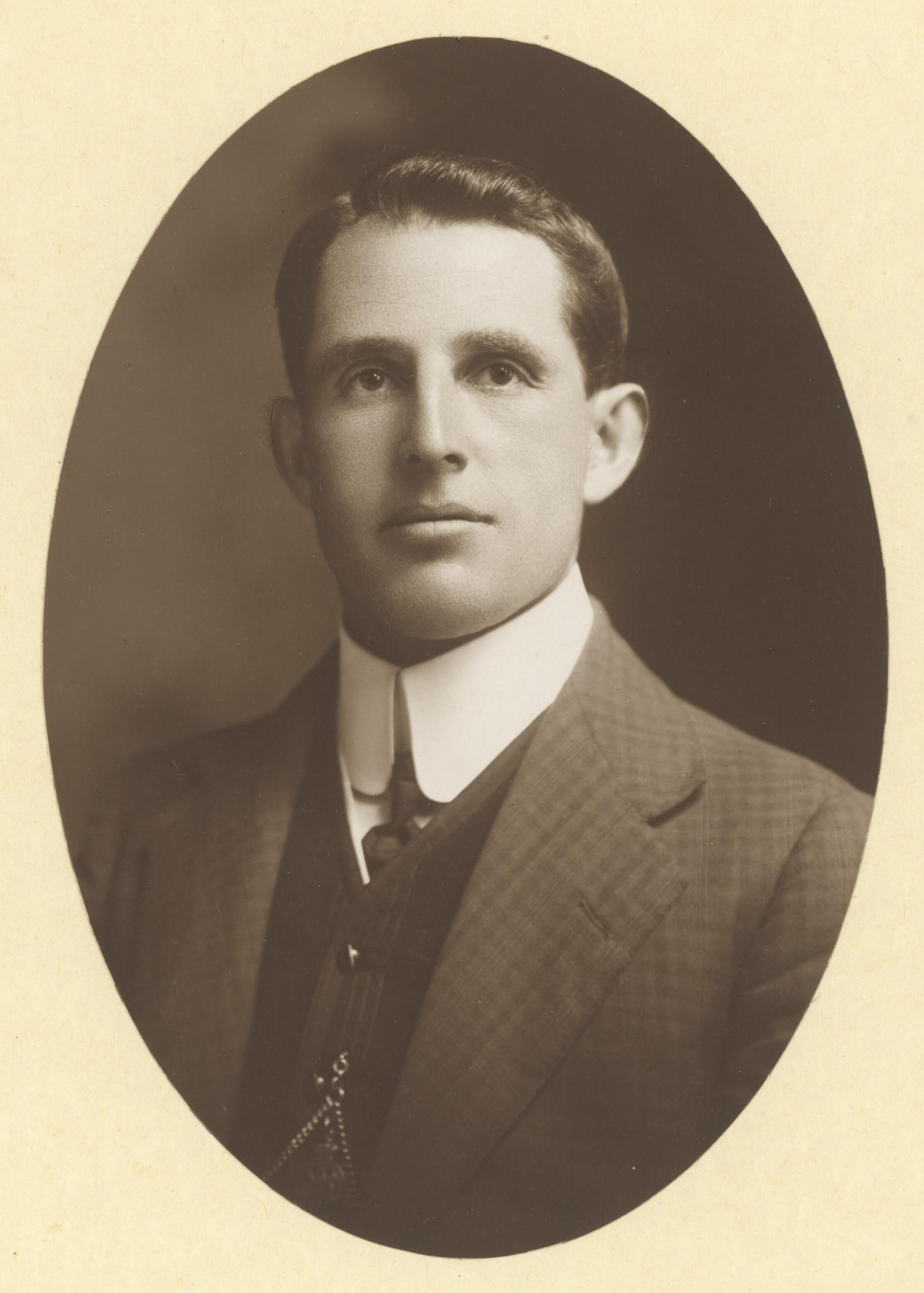

Senator for Tasmania
- In office 1 July 1910 – 1 March 1917
- Succeeded by: John Earle

Personal details
- Born: 15 December 1878 Latrobe, Tasmania, Australia
- Died: 28 July 1958 (aged 79) Kew, Victoria, Australia
- Party: Labor
- Spouse: Vida Lee (m. 1901)
- Occupation: Draper

Rudolph Keith Ready (15 December 1878 – 28 July 1958) was an Australian politician and businessman. He was a member of the Australian Labor Party (ALP) and served as a Senator for Tasmania from 1910 to 1917, including as Government Whip from 1914 to 1917. He is primarily remembered for the controversial circumstances of his resignation.

== Early life ==
Ready was born on 15 December 1878 in Latrobe, Tasmania. He was the son of Mary (née Mumford) and Samuel Ready, his father working as a saddler. He attended a local primary school and also studied at the Latrobe Commercial College before being apprenticed as a draper. At the age of 19 he was appointed as the manager of the Button Brothers store in Campbell Town.

== Politics ==
=== Early involvement ===
Ready joined the Reform League, a short-lived liberal organisation, in 1903, but soon resigned and joined the Tasmanian Workers' Political League. He helped establish the Campbell Town branch of the league in 1908 and was its honorary secretary. He was elected to the state executive the following year and was also secretary and treasurer of the divisional council for the Franklin electorate.

=== Senate ===
At the 1910 federal election, aged 31, Ready was elected to a six-year term in the Senate. He was re-elected at the 1914 election following a double dissolution. In parliament, Ready served on the select committee into the 1913 election and the royal commission into the fruit industry. He was the assistant secretary of the ALP caucus and served as the party's Senate whip from 1914 to 1917. He spoke primarily on Tasmanian matters and supported the ALP platform. In 1916 he became the first senator to visit King Island.

In December 1916, Ready was appointed as the chairman of the Tasmanian Recruiting Committee by Donald Mackinnon, the federal director-general of recruiting. His appointment was poorly received by the public, particularly returned soldiers, and he quickly resigned from the position. However, a few weeks later he decided to accept the post after all, at Mackinnon's request.

=== Resignation and aftermath ===
Ready supported the "No" vote at the 1916 referendum on overseas conscription, remaining loyal to the ALP following the subsequent party split which saw Prime Minister Billy Hughes expelled. He resigned from the Senate on 1 March 1917, aged 38, due to ill health. Despite his political record, it was widely rumoured that he had resigned to allow Hughes to appoint a member of his new Nationalist Party to the Senate, which occurred with the nomination of former ALP premier John Earle. Ready received a show cause notice from the Tasmanian Labor Federation, but refused to reply; the central executive eventually decided to take no action. In May 1917 he commented that he was glad to be "out of the sphere of such Parliamentary pirates who sail under the black flag of malignity and party bitterness".

In 1922, Ready supported the re-election of Herbert Smith, a Nationalist member of the Victorian Legislative Council.

== Personal life ==
Ready married Vida Constance Lee in 1901, with whom he had five children. After leaving politics he opened a bicycle shop in Invermay. He moved to Melbourne in about 1920, living in the suburb of Kew and working as a publicity agent and dairy broker. He died in Kew on 28 July 1958, aged 80.

Honorary titles
Preceded by George Pearce	Earliest serving living Senator; 1956 – 1958	Succeeded by Harry Foll
