= 1914 Australian federal election =

Election for the 6th Parliament of Australia

- 5 September 1914

All 75 seats in the House of Representatives 38 seats were needed for a majority in the House All 36 seats in the Senate
- Registered: 2,811,515 ▲1.86%
- Turnout: 1,726,906 (73.53%) (Note: Turnout in contested seats) (▲0.04 pp)
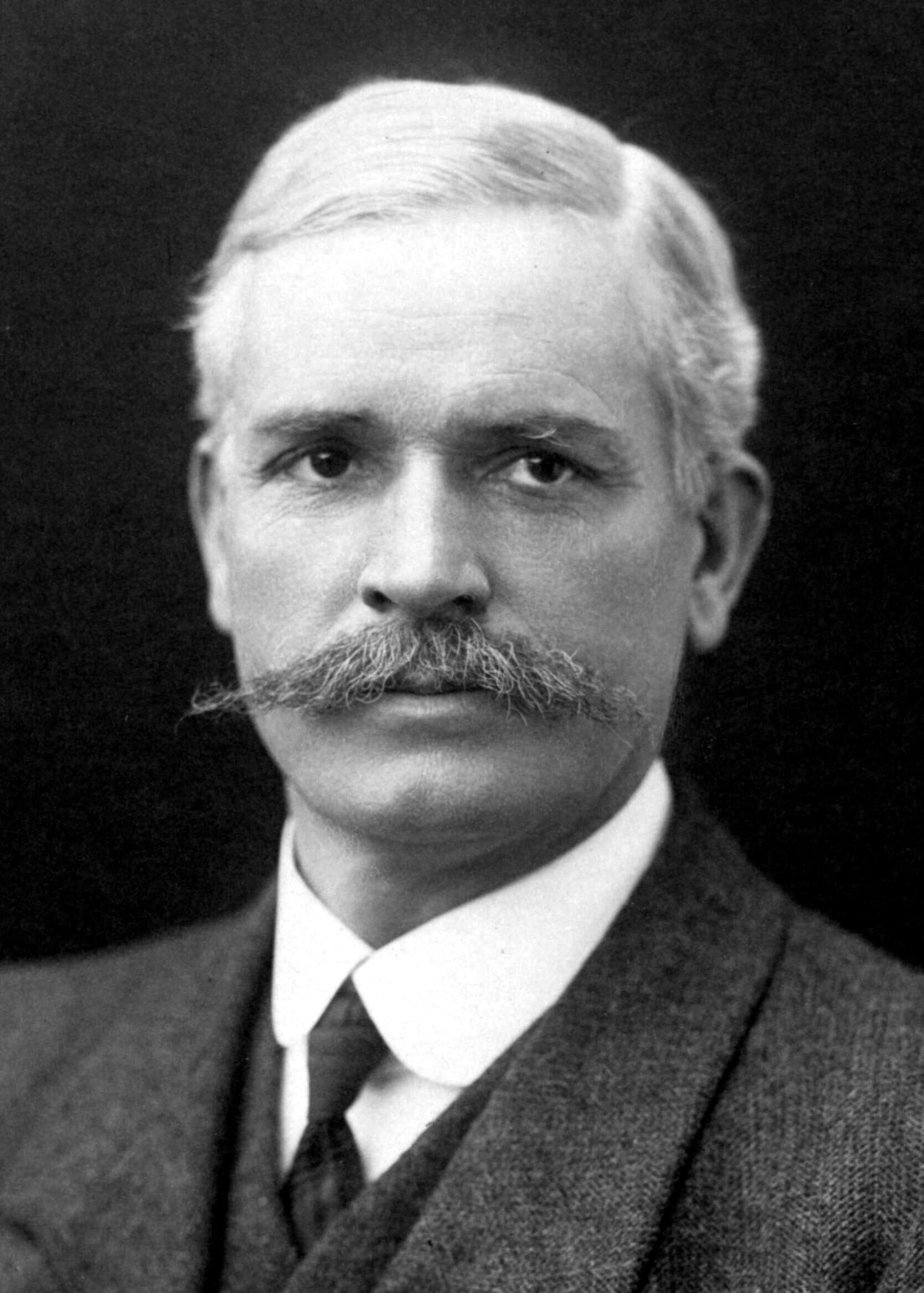

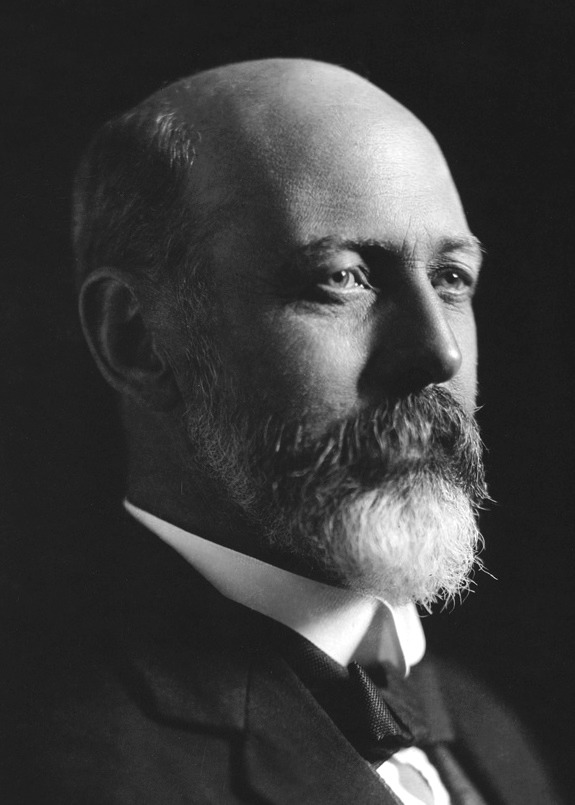
| | First party | Second party |
|---|---|---|
| Leader | Andrew Fisher | Joseph Cook |
| Party | Labor | Liberal |
| Leader since | 30 October 1907 | 20 January 1913 |
| Leader's seat | Wide Bay (Qld) | Parramatta (NSW) |
| Last election | 37 seats | 38 seats |
| Seats won | 42 seats | 32 seats |
| Seat change | ▲5 | ▼6 |
| Popular vote | 858,451 | 796,397 |
| Percentage | 50.89% | 47.21% |
| Swing | ▲2.42% | ▼1.73% |
- Results by division for the House of Representatives, shaded by winning party's margin of victory.
Prime Minister before election
Joseph Cook
Liberal
Subsequent Prime Minister
Andrew Fisher
Labor

The 1914 Australian federal election was held in Australia on 5 September 1914. The election had been called before the declaration of war in August 1914. All 75 seats in the House of Representatives and all 36 seats in the Senate were up for election, as a result of a double dissolution being granted, the first in Australian history. The incumbent Liberal Party, led by Prime Minister Joseph Cook, was defeated by the opposition Labor Party under Andrew Fisher, who returned for a third term as prime minister.

The Cook government is one of only two non-Labor governments in Australian history that did not last longer than the Labor government it had replaced; the other was the Howard government, which was defeated in 2007.

This election also marks the only time that three consecutive elections resulted in changes of government. Indeed, even two consecutive elections resulting in changes of government has only occurred on one instance since this election – in 1929 and 1931.

Fisher is one of only two Labor leaders who took the party from Opposition to Government and also had previous experience as a minister, the other being Anthony Albanese. This election was the second time he accomplished this, the first being in 1910.

This election resulted in the highest ever primary vote percentage for the Labor Party, at 50.89%, and was the first time that Labor achieved more than 50% of the primary vote. The only other time this happened was in 1954.

== Background ==
The 1913 federal election had given Cook's Liberal Party a one-seat majority in the House of Representatives. As prime minister, Cook faced significant difficulties in passing legislation, controlling the House only through the casting vote of the speaker and dealing with a substantial ALP majority in the Senate.

=== Double dissolution ===
Both the Liberals and ALP sought an early election with the aiming of breaking the political deadlock and securing majorities in both houses. In early 1914, the Senate twice rejected the Liberals' Government Preference Prohibition Bill 1914, which would have abolished the previous ALP government's policy of giving preference to trade union members in the Commonwealth Public Service. Cook used this as an opportunity to secure Australia's first double dissolution, a provision contained in section 57 of the constitution.

== Election dates ==
The parliament was dissolved and the writs for the election were formally issued on 30 July, with the close of nominations on 5 August.

== Campaign ==
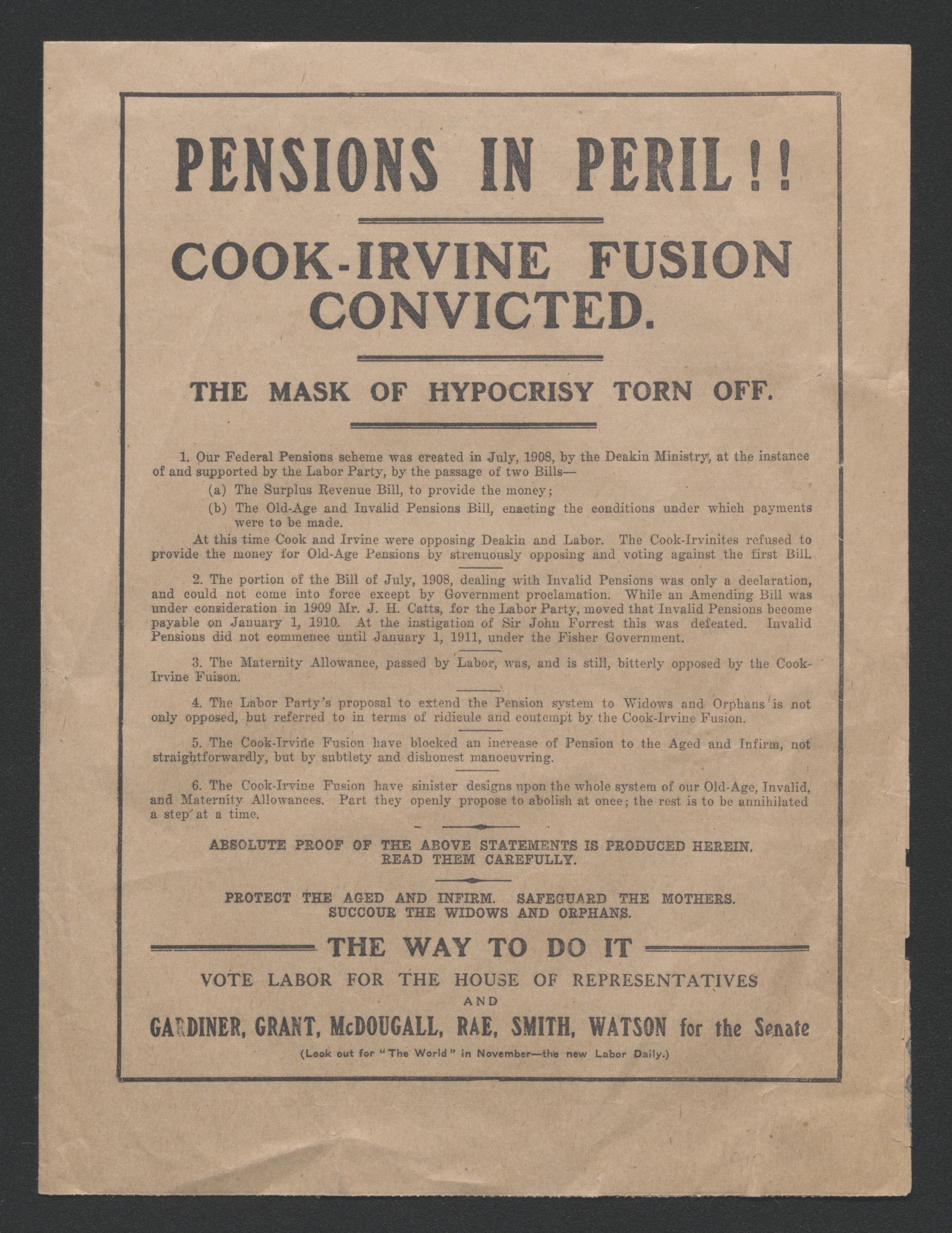
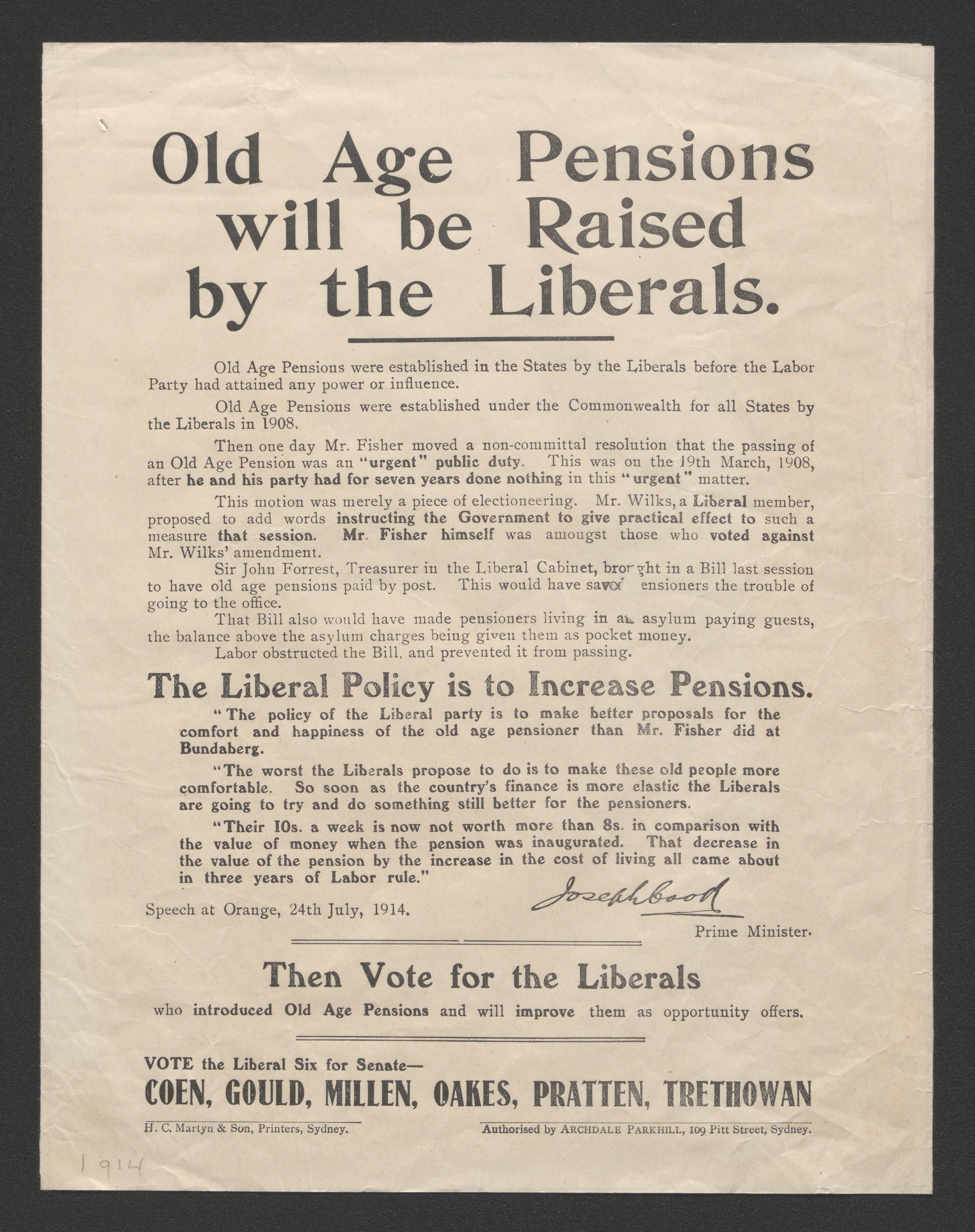
Competing campaign posters on old-age pensions – ALP (left) and Liberal (right)

The election campaign encompassed the assassination of Archduke Franz Ferdinand on 28 June, the ensuing July Crisis and outbreak of World War I on 28 July, and the British Empire's entry into the war on 4 August. As a result – whilst the campaign initially focused on the domestic matters which had been the source of the political deadlock that triggered the double-dissolution election in the first place – Australia's role in the war and support for Britain became more pressing issues later in the campaign.

=== Campaign launches and domestic agenda ===
Cook launched the Liberal Party's campaign on 14 July in Parramatta, New South Wales. He defended his decision to call an early election and accused the ALP of obstructionism.

Fisher's campaign speech was delivered on 6 July in Bundaberg, Queensland. He announced that his priorities if returned to office would include reducing industrial unrest, addressing the cost of living, and breaking up trusts and monopolies. He promised to resubmit the ALP's proposed constitutional reforms – narrowly defeated at a 1913 referendum – to another referendum, and to introduce legislation permitting citizen-initiated referendums. Fisher defended the previous Labor government's legacy and promised to expand on its social reforms by increasing spending on health and pensions, introducing government-owned insurance, establishing public-sector superannuation schemes, and standardising Australia's rail gauges. He was critical of the Cook government's fiscal management and its policy of funding defence expenditure through borrowings rather than revenue.

== Results ==
=== House of Representatives ===
Labor: 42 seats Liberal: 32 seats Independent: 1 seat

House of Reps 1914–17 (FPTP) Turnout 73.53% (Non-CV) Informal 2.32%
| Party | Votes | % | Swing | Seats | Change |
|---|---|---|---|---|---|
| Labor | 858,451 | 50.89 | +2.42 | 42 | +5 |
| Liberal | 796,397 | 47.21 | −1.73 | 32 | -6 |
| Independents | 31,915 | 1.89 | −0.70 | 1 | +1 |
| Total | 1,686,763 | | | 75 | |
| Labor | Win | | | 42 | +5 |
| Liberal | | | | 32 | −6 |

Notes

- Independents: George Wise (Gippsland, Vic)
- Thirteen members were elected unopposed – seven Labor and six Liberal.

Popular vote
| Labor | 50.89% |
| Liberal | 47.21% |
| Independent | 1.89% |

Parliament seats
| Labor | 56.00% |
| Liberal | 42.67% |
| Independent | 1.33% |

=== Senate ===
Senate 1914–17 (FPTP BV) Turnout 72.64% (Non-CV) Informal N/A
| Party | Votes | % | Swing | Seats won | Seats held | Change |
|---|---|---|---|---|---|---|
| Labor | 6,119,018 | 52.15 | +3.43 | 31 | 31 | +2 |
| Liberal | 5,605,305 | 47.77 | −1.61 | 5 | 5 | −2 |
| Independents | 9,799 | 0.08 | –0.78 | 0 | 0 | 0 |
| Total | 11,734,122 | | | 36 | 36 | |

== Seats changing hands ==
| Seat | Pre-1914 | | | Swing | Post-1914 | | |
| Seat | Party | Member | Margin | Swing | Margin | Member | Party |
|---|---|---|---|---|---|---|---|
| Corio, Vic | Liberal | William Kendell | 1.4 | 3.0 | 1.2 | Alfred Ozanne | Labor |
| Gippsland, Vic | Liberal | James Bennett | 5.0 | 6.0 | 1.0 | George Wise | Independent |
| Grampians, Vic | Liberal | Hans Irvine | 3.9 | 4.2 | 0.3 | Edward Jolley | Labor |
| Indi, Vic | Liberal | Cornelius Ahern | 1.8 | 3.0 | 1.0 | Parker Moloney | Labor |
| Riverina, NSW | Liberal | Franc Falkiner | 1.0 | 3.1 | 2.1 | John Chanter | Labor |
| Werriwa, NSW | Liberal | Alfred Conroy | 5.9 | 5.9 | 0.0 | John Lynch | Labor |

== Post-election pendulum ==
Government seats
Australian Labor Party
Marginal
| Werriwa (NSW) | John Lynch | ALP | 00.0 |
| Grampians (Vic) | Edward Jolley | ALP | 00.3 |
| Indi (Vic) | Parker Moloney | ALP | 01.0 |
| Corio (Vic) | Alfred Ozanne | ALP | 01.2 |
| Ballaarat (Vic) | Charles McGrath | ALP | 01.2 |
| Riverina (NSW) | John Chanter | ALP | 02.1 |
| Macquarie (NSW) | Ernest Carr | ALP | 03.3 |
| Gwydir (NSW) | William Webster | ALP | 03.8 |
| Grey (SA) | Alexander Poynton | ALP | 04.0 |
| Illawarra (NSW) | George Burns | ALP | 04.2 |
| Hunter (NSW) | Matthew Charlton | ALP | 04.6 |
| Bendigo (Vic) | John Arthur | ALP | 05.1 |
| Boothby (SA) | George Dankel | ALP | 05.3 |
| Denison (Tas) | William Laird Smith | ALP | 05.9 |
Fairly safe
| Bass (Tas) | Jens Jensen | ALP | 06.0 |
| Darwin (Tas) | King O'Malley | ALP | 06.1 |
| Fremantle (WA) | Reginald Burchell | ALP | 06.3 |
| Oxley (Qld) | James Sharpe | ALP | 06.8 |
| East Sydney (NSW) | John West | ALP | 07.3 |
| Fawkner (Vic) | Joseph Hannan | ALP | 09.3 |
Safe
| Brisbane (Qld) | William Finlayson | ALP | 10.3 |
| Darling (NSW) | William Spence | ALP | 10.5 |
| Dalley (NSW) | Robert Howe | ALP | 11.3 |
| Cook (NSW) | James Catts | ALP | 11.7 |
| Wide Bay (Qld) | Andrew Fisher | ALP | 14.3 vs QFU |
| Maribyrnong (Vic) | James Fenton | ALP | 14.3 |
| Herbert (Qld) | Fred Bamford | ALP | 14.4 |
| Bourke (Vic) | Frank Anstey | ALP | 15.9 |
| Adelaide (SA) | George Edwin Yates | ALP | 16.4 |
| Capricornia (Qld) | William Higgs | ALP | 17.4 |
| South Sydney (NSW) | Edward Riley | ALP | 18.8 |
| Melbourne (Vic) | William Maloney | ALP | 19.3 |
Very safe
| Hindmarsh (SA) | William Archibald | ALP | 24.4 |
| West Sydney (NSW) | Billy Hughes | ALP | 25.3 |
| Barrier (NSW) | Josiah Thomas | ALP | 29.7 |
| Batman (Vic) | Frank Brennan | ALP | unopposed |
| Kalgoorlie (WA) | Hugh Mahon | ALP | unopposed |
| Kennedy (Qld) | Charles McDonald | ALP | unopposed |
| Maranoa (Qld) | Jim Page | ALP | unopposed |
| Melbourne Ports (Vic) | James Mathews | ALP | unopposed |
| Newcastle (NSW) | David Watkins | ALP | unopposed |
| Yarra (Vic) | Frank Tudor | ALP | unopposed |

Non-government seats
Liberal Party
Marginal
| Hume (NSW) | Robert Patten | LIB | 01.0 |
| Calare (NSW) | Henry Pigott | LIB | 01.2 |
| Corangamite (Vic) | Chester Manifold | LIB | 01.6 |
| Lilley (Qld) | Jacob Stumm | LIB | 02.3 |
| Wakefield (SA) | Richard Foster | LIB | 02.4 |
| Flinders (Vic) | William Irvine | LIB | 02.7 |
| Nepean (NSW) | Richard Orchard | LIB | 02.7 |
| Robertson (NSW) | William Fleming | LIB | 03.4 |
| Lang (NSW) | Elliot Johnson | LIB | 03.5 |
| Wannon (Vic) | Arthur Rodgers | LIB | 03.6 |
| Dampier (WA) | Henry Gregory | LIB | 03.9 |
| Perth (WA) | James Fowler | LIB | 05.8 |
Fairly safe
| Wentworth (NSW) | Willie Kelly | LIB | 06.5 |
| New England (NSW) | Percy Abbott | LIB | 06.7 |
| Barker (SA) | John Livingston | LIB | 06.7 |
| Darling Downs (Qld) | Littleton Groom | LIB | 06.9 |
| Moreton (Qld) | Hugh Sinclair | LIB | 07.3 |
| Henty (Vic) | James Boyd | LIB | 07.7 |
| Echuca (Vic) | Albert Palmer | LIB | 08.2 |
| Balaclava (Vic) | William Watt | LIB | 08.4 |
| Parkes (NSW) | Bruce Smith | LIB | 08.5 |
| Eden-Monaro (NSW) | Austin Chapman | LIB | 09.2 |
| Swan (WA) | John Forrest | LIB | 09.2 |
Safe
| Wilmot (Tas) | Llewellyn Atkinson | LIB | 10.9 |
| Kooyong (Vic) | Robert Best | LIB | 13.3 vs IND |
| North Sydney (NSW) | Granville Ryrie | LIB | 17.6 |
Very safe
| Angas (SA) | Paddy Glynn | LIB | unopposed |
| Cowper (NSW) | John Thomson | LIB | unopposed |
| Franklin (Tas) | William McWilliams | LIB | unopposed |
| Parramatta (NSW) | Joseph Cook | LIB | unopposed |
| Richmond (NSW) | Walter Massy-Greene | LIB | unopposed |
| Wimmera (Vic) | Sydney Sampson | LIB | unopposed |
Independents
| Gippsland (Vic) | George Wise | IND | 01.0 vs LIB |

== See also ==
- Candidates of the 1914 Australian federal election
- Members of the Australian House of Representatives, 1914–1917
- Members of the Australian Senate, 1914–1917

== Sources ==
- Day, David (2008). Andrew Fisher: Prime Minister of Australia. HarperCollins. ISBN 9780732276102.
- Irving, Helen (2014). "Pulling the Trigger: The 1914 Double Dissolution Election and Its Legacy" (PDF). Papers on Parliament. Australian Parliamentary Library.
