= Candidates of the 1917 Australian federal election =

This article provides information on candidates who stood for the 1917 Australian federal election. The election was held on 5 May 1917.

Many Labor members had merged with the Commonwealth Liberal Party to form the Nationalist Party. Seats held by the Liberal Party are considered to be held by the Nationalist Party. The seats held by Labor defectors are considered to be held by Labor.

== By-elections, appointments and defections ==
=== By-elections and appointments ===
- On 6 February 1915, Alfred Hampson (Labor) was elected to succeed John Arthur (Labor) as the member for Bendigo.
- On 20 February 1915, Carty Salmon (Liberal) was elected to succeed Edward Jolley (Labor) as the member for Grampians.
- On 6 May 1915, William Mahony (Labor) was elected unopposed to succeed Robert Howe (Labor) as the member for Dalley.
- On 11 December 1915, Edward Corser (Liberal) was elected to succeed Andrew Fisher (Labor) as the member for Wide Bay.
- On 1 March 1917, John Earle (Nationalist) was appointed as a Tasmanian Senator to replace Rudolph Ready (Labor).
- Subsequent to the election, but prior to the new Senate being sworn in:
  - On 24 May 1917, James Rowell (Nationalist) was appointed as a South Australian Senator to replace William Story (Nationalist).

=== Defections ===
- In November 1916, pro-conscription Labor members left the party to form the National Labor Party under the leadership of Labor Prime Minister Billy Hughes (West Sydney). Hughes was joined by MPs William Archibald (Hindmarsh), Fred Bamford (Herbert), Reginald Burchell (Fremantle), Ernest Carr (Macquarie), John Chanter (Riverina), George Dankel (Boothby), Jens Jensen (Bass), William Laird Smith (Denison), John Lynch (Werriwa), Alexander Poynton (Grey), William Spence (Darling), Josiah Thomas (Barrier) and William Webster (Gwydir). In the Senate, the party was joined by Victorian Senator Edward Russell; Queensland Senator Thomas Givens; Western Australian Senators Richard Buzacott, George Henderson, Hugh de Largie, Patrick Lynch and George Pearce; and South Australian Senators Robert Guthrie, John Newland, William Senior and William Story.
- In early 1917, Prime Minister Billy Hughes negotiated a merger of his National Labor Party with Joseph Cook's Liberal Party. The resulting Nationalist Party (Australia) was joined by all National Labor and Liberal members, as well as Independent MP George Wise (Gippsland).

== Seat changes ==
- A number of the ex-Labor Nationalists moved to new seats, as their old seats were unwinnable for conservative candidates.
  - The member for Barrier (NSW), Josiah Thomas, contested the Senate.
  - The member for West Sydney (NSW), Prime Minister Billy Hughes, contested the Victorian seat of Bendigo.
  - South Australian Senator William Story contested Boothby.

== Retiring Members and Senators ==
=== Nationalist ===
- George Dankel MP (Boothby, SA) [elected as Labor]
- Robert Patten MP (Hume, NSW)
- Jacob Stumm MP (Lilley, Qld)
- Senator Sir Albert Gould (NSW)

== House of Representatives ==
Sitting members at the time of the election are shown in bold text. Successful candidates are highlighted in the relevant colour. Where there is possible confusion, an asterisk (*) is also used.

=== New South Wales ===
Electorate	Held by	Labor candidate	Nationalist candidate	Other candidates
Barrier	Labor	Michael Considine	Brian Doe	William Montgomery (Ind Nat)
Calare	Nationalist	Thomas Lavelle	**Henry Pigott**	
Cook	Labor	**James Catts**	Richard Sleath	
Cowper	Nationalist		**John Thomson**	
Dalley	Labor	**William Mahony**	Albert Lane	
Darling	Labor	Arthur Blakeley	**William Spence**	
East Sydney	Labor	**John West**		
Eden-Monaro	Nationalist	John Bailey	**Austin Chapman**	
Gwydir	Labor	Cecil Last	**William Webster**	
Hume	Nationalist	Robert Cruickshank	Franc Falkiner	
Hunter	Labor	**Matthew Charlton**	William Ferguson	
Illawarra	Labor	**George Burns**	Hector Lamond	
Lang	Nationalist	Percy Evans	**Elliot Johnson**	
Macquarie	Labor	Samuel Nicholls	**Ernest Carr**	
Nepean	Nationalist	Tom Arthur	**Richard Orchard**	
New England	Nationalist		**Percy Abbott**	
Newcastle	Labor	**David Watkins**	Arthur Griffith	
North Sydney	Nationalist		**Granville Ryrie**	
Parkes	Nationalist	Mark Gosling	**Bruce Smith**	
Parramatta	Nationalist		**Joseph Cook**	Alfred Conroy (Ind)
Richmond	Nationalist	John Steele	**Walter Massy-Greene**	
Riverina	Labor	Arthur Williams	**John Chanter**	
Robertson	Nationalist	Eva Seery	**William Fleming**	
South Sydney	Labor	**Edward Riley**	Alick Kay	
Wentworth	Nationalist	Henrietta Greville	**Willie Kelly**	
Werriwa	Labor	Jack Christopher	**John Lynch**	
West Sydney	Labor	Con Wallace	Gideon Gillespie	

=== Queensland ===
Electorate	Held by	Labor candidate	Nationalist candidate
Brisbane	Labor	**William Finlayson**	Alfred Plane
Capricornia	Labor	**William Higgs**	Robert Duncan
Darling Downs	Nationalist	John Wilson	**Littleton Groom**
Herbert	Labor	Eugene McKenna	**Fred Bamford**
Kennedy	Labor	**Charles McDonald**	Hubert Sizer
Lilley	Nationalist	Harald Jensen	George Mackay
Maranoa	Labor	**Jim Page**	Herbert Yeates
Moreton	Nationalist	Cuthbert Butler	**Hugh Sinclair**
Oxley	Labor	**James Sharpe**	James Bayley
Wide Bay	Nationalist	Frederick Martyn	**Edward Corser**

=== South Australia ===
Electorate	Held by	Labor candidate	Nationalist candidate
Adelaide	Labor	**George Edwin Yates**	
Angas	Nationalist	Sid O'Flaherty	**Paddy Glynn**
Barker	Nationalist	Stanley Whitford	**John Livingston**
Boothby	Labor	John Gunn	William Story
Grey	Labor	Thomas Lyons	**Alexander Poynton**
Hindmarsh	Labor	James Cavanagh	**William Archibald**
Wakefield	Nationalist	Norman Makin	**Richard Foster**

=== Tasmania ===
Electorate	Held by	Labor candidate	Nationalist candidate	Independent candidate(s)
Bass	Labor	James Mooney	**Jens Jensen**	
Darwin	Labor	**King O'Malley**	Charles Howroyd	
Denison	Labor	Benjamin Watkins	**William Laird Smith**	
Franklin	Nationalist		**William McWilliams**	
Wilmot	Nationalist	Christopher Sheedy	**Llewellyn Atkinson**	Norman Cameron; Louis Page

=== Victoria ===
Electorate	Held by	Labor candidate	Nationalist candidate	Independent candidate(s)
Balaclava	Nationalist	Alfred Foster	**William Watt**	
Ballaarat	Labor	**Charles McGrath**		
Batman	Labor	**Frank Brennan**	Frederick O'Neill	
Bendigo	Labor	**Alfred Hampson**	**Billy Hughes**	
Bourke	Labor	**Frank Anstey**	Arthur May	
Corangamite	Nationalist	Christopher Bennett	**Chester Manifold**	
Corio	Labor	**Alfred Ozanne**	John Lister	
Echuca	Nationalist	Thomas Power	**Albert Palmer**	
Fawkner	Labor	**Joseph Hannan**	George Maxwell	Frank Henty
Flinders	Nationalist	David Russell	**Sir William Irvine**	
Gippsland	Independent	Thomas Holloway	**George Wise**	
Grampians	Nationalist	John McDougall	**Carty Salmon**	
Henty	Nationalist	William Smith	**James Boyd**	
Indi	Labor	**Parker Moloney**	John Leckie	
Kooyong	Nationalist		**Sir Robert Best**	
Maribyrnong	Labor	**James Fenton**	Edmund Jowett	
Melbourne	Labor	**William Maloney**	Reginald Tracey	
Melbourne Ports	Labor	**James Mathews**	William Fozard	
Wannon	Nationalist	Egerton Holden	**Arthur Rodgers**	
Wimmera	Nationalist		**Sydney Sampson**	
Yarra	Labor	**Frank Tudor**	Charles Copeland	

=== Western Australia ===
Electorate	Held by	Labor candidate	Nationalist candidate
Dampier	Nationalist	Michael Costello	**Henry Gregory**
Fremantle	Labor	Jack Simons	**Reginald Burchell**
Kalgoorlie	Labor	**Hugh Mahon**	Edward Heitmann
Perth	Nationalist	Alexander Panton	**James Fowler**
Swan	Nationalist		**Sir John Forrest**

== Senate ==
Sitting Senators are shown in bold text. Tickets that elected at least one Senator are highlighted in the relevant colour. Successful candidates are identified by an asterisk (*).

=== New South Wales ===
Three seats were up for election. The Labor Party was defending one seat. The Nationalist Party was defending two seats. Labor Senators Albert Gardiner, John Grant and Allan McDougall were not up for re-election.

Labor candidates	Nationalist candidates	Socialist Labor candidates
Peter Bowling; Arthur Rae; **David Watson**	**Edward Millen***; Herbert Pratten*; Josiah Thomas*	Ernie Judd; Ludwig Klausen; James Moroney

=== Queensland ===
Three seats were up for election. The Labor Party was defending three seats. Labor Senators Myles Ferricks and William Ryott Maughan and Nationalist Senator Thomas Givens were not up for re-election.

Labor candidates	Nationalist candidates	Independent candidates
**John Mullan**; **James Stewart**; **Harry Turley**	Thomas Crawford*; Harry Foll*; Matthew Reid*	John Adamson

=== South Australia ===
Three seats were up for election. The Labor Party was defending two seats. The Nationalist Party was defending one seat. Labor Senator James O'Loghlin and Nationalist Senators John Newland and John Shannon were not up for re-election.

Labor candidates	Nationalist candidates
Thomas Butterfield; Lionel Hill; Frank Lundie	**Robert Guthrie***; James Rowell*; **William Senior***

=== Tasmania ===
Three seats were up for election. The Nationalist Party was defending three seats. Labor Senators James Guy, James Long and David O'Keefe were not up for re-election.

Labor candidates	Nationalist candidates	Independent candidates
James Belton; James Hurst; Walter Woods	**Thomas Bakhap***; **John Earle***; **John Keating***	Cyril Cameron; Henry Goodluck

=== Victoria ===
Three seats were up for election. The Labor Party was defending three seats. Labor Senators Stephen Barker and John Barnes and Nationalist Senator Edward Russell were not up for re-election.

Labor candidates	Nationalist candidates	Independent candidates
**Albert Blakey**; **Edward Findley**; **Andrew McKissock**	William Bolton*; George Fairbairn*; William Plain*	Vida Goldstein

=== Western Australia ===
Three seats were up for election. The Labor Party was defending three seats. Labor Senator Ted Needham and Nationalist Senators Patrick Lynch and George Pearce were not up for re-election.

Labor candidates	Nationalist candidates
Cyril Bryan; George Dennis; John Lutey	**Richard Buzacott***; **Hugh de Largie***; **George Henderson***

== See also ==
- 1917 Australian federal election
- Members of the Australian House of Representatives, 1914–1917
- Members of the Australian House of Representatives, 1917–1919
- Members of the Australian Senate, 1914–1917
- Members of the Australian Senate, 1917–1920
- List of political parties in Australia
