= Members of the Australian Senate, 1914–1917 =

Members of the Australian Senate, 1914-1917
- ←1913-1914 1917-1920→
- Composition 1914-1916 Government (31) - (12 seat majority); Labor (31) Opposition (5); Liberal (5); Composition 1917; Government (17) - (2 seat minority); Nationalist (17) Opposition (19) Labor (19)

This is a list of members of the Australian Senate from 1914 to 1917. The 5 September 1914 election was a double dissolution called by Prime Minister of Australia Joseph Cook in an attempt to gain control of the Senate. All 75 seats in the House of Representatives, and all 36 seats in the Senate were up for election. The incumbent Commonwealth Liberal Party was defeated by the opposition Australian Labor Party led by Andrew Fisher, who announced with the outbreak of World War I during the campaign that under a Labor government, Australia would "stand beside the mother country to help and defend her to the last man and the last shilling."

In accordance with section 13 of the Constitution, terms for senators was taken to commence on 1 July 1914. The Senate resolved that in each State the three senators who received the most votes would sit for a six-year term, finishing on 30 June 1920 while the other half would sit for a three-year term, finishing on 30 June 1917.

In September 1916, 24 Labor members of the House of Representatives and the Senate—including Prime Minister Billy Hughes—were expelled for their support of conscription during World War I and later formed the National Labor Party, which merged with the Commonwealth Liberal Party in February 1917 to form the Nationalist Party (Australia).

Images	Senator	Party	State	Term ending	Years in office	Portfolio
	Thomas Bakhap	Liberal	Tasmania	1917	1913–1923	
	Thomas Bakhap	Nationalist	Tasmania	1917	1913–1923	
	Stephen Barker	Labor	Victoria	1920	1910–1920, 1923–1924	
	John Barnes	Labor	Victoria	1920	1913–1920, 1923–1935	
	Albert Blakey	Labor	Victoria	1917	1910–1917	
	Richard Buzacott	Labor	Western Australia	1917	1910–1923	
	Richard Buzacott	National Labor	Western Australia	1917	1910–1923	
	Richard Buzacott	Nationalist	Western Australia	1917	1910–1923	
	Hugh de Largie	Labor	Western Australia	1917	1901–1923	• Chief National Labor Whip in the Senate from 14 November 1916 to 17 February 1917 • Chief Nationalist Whip in the Senate from 13 June 1917 to 10 February 1923 • Chief Government Whip in the Senate from 14 November 1916 to 10 February 1923
	Hugh de Largie	National Labor	Western Australia	1917	1901–1923	• Chief National Labor Whip in the Senate from 14 November 1916 to 17 February 1917 • Chief Nationalist Whip in the Senate from 13 June 1917 to 10 February 1923 • Chief Government Whip in the Senate from 14 November 1916 to 10 February 1923
	Hugh de Largie	Nationalist	Western Australia	1917	1901–1923	• Chief National Labor Whip in the Senate from 14 November 1916 to 17 February 1917 • Chief Nationalist Whip in the Senate from 13 June 1917 to 10 February 1923 • Chief Government Whip in the Senate from 14 November 1916 to 10 February 1923
	John Earle (Note: Labor senator Rudolph Ready resigned on 1 March 1917; on the same day Nationalist John Earle was appointed to replace him.)	Nationalist	Tasmania	1917 (Note: Appointed to a casual vacancy and only held office until the earlier of the next election for the House of Representatives or the Senate.)	1917–1923	
	Myles Ferricks	Labor	Queensland	1920	1913–1920	
	Edward Findley	Labor	Victoria	1917	1904–1917, 1923–1929	
	Albert Gardiner	Labor	New South Wales	1920	1910–1926, 1928	• Vice-President of the Executive Council from 17 September 1914 to 27 October 1916 • Deputy Leader of the Labor Party from 14 November 1916 to 30 June 1926 • Leader of the Opposition in the Senate from 17 February 1917 to 30 June 1926
	Thomas Givens	Labor	Queensland	1920	1904–1928	• President of the Senate from 9 July 1913 to 30 June 1926
	Thomas Givens	National Labor	Queensland	1920	1904–1928	• President of the Senate from 9 July 1913 to 30 June 1926
	Thomas Givens	Nationalist	Queensland	1920	1904–1928	• President of the Senate from 9 July 1913 to 30 June 1926
	Albert Gould	Liberal	New South Wales	1917	1901–1917	
	Albert Gould	Nationalist	New South Wales	1917	1901–1917	
	John Grant	Labor	New South Wales	1920	1914–1920, 1923–1928	
	Robert Guthrie	Labor	South Australia	1917	1904–1921	
	Robert Guthrie	National Labor	South Australia	1917	1904–1921	
	Robert Guthrie	Nationalist	South Australia	1917	1904–1921	
	James Guy	Labor	Tasmania	1920	1914–1920	
	George Henderson	Labor	Western Australia	1917	1904–1923	• Chairman of Committees from 9 October 1914 to 30 June 1917
	George Henderson	National Labor	Western Australia	1917	1904–1923	• Chairman of Committees from 9 October 1914 to 30 June 1917
	George Henderson	Nationalist	Western Australia	1917	1904–1923	• Chairman of Committees from 9 October 1914 to 30 June 1917
	John Keating	Liberal	Tasmania	1917	1901–1923	
	John Keating	Nationalist	Tasmania	1917	1901–1923	
	James Long	Labor	Tasmania	1920	1910–1918	
	Patrick Lynch	Labor	Western Australia	1920	1907–1938	• Minister for Works and Railways from 14 November 1916 to 17 February 1917
	Patrick Lynch	National Labor	Western Australia	1920	1907–1938	• Minister for Works and Railways from 14 November 1916 to 17 February 1917
	Patrick Lynch	Nationalist	Western Australia	1920	1907–1938	• Minister for Works and Railways from 14 November 1916 to 17 February 1917
	William Maughan	Labor	Queensland	1920	1913–1920	
	Allan McDougall	Labor	New South Wales	1920	1910–1920, 1922–1924	
	Andrew McKissock	Labor	Victoria	1917	1914–1917	
	Edward Millen	Liberal	New South Wales	1917	1901–1923	• Leader of the Opposition in the Senate from 30 July 1914 to 17 February 1917 • Leader of the Government in the Senate from 17 February 1917 to 9 February 1923 • Vice-President of the Executive Council from 17 February 1917 to 10 January 1918 • Minister for Reparation from 17 February 1917 to 9 February 1923
	Edward Millen	Nationalist	New South Wales	1917	1901–1923	• Leader of the Opposition in the Senate from 30 July 1914 to 17 February 1917 • Leader of the Government in the Senate from 17 February 1917 to 9 February 1923 • Vice-President of the Executive Council from 17 February 1917 to 10 January 1918 • Minister for Reparation from 17 February 1917 to 9 February 1923
	John Mullan	Labor	Queensland	1917	1913–1917	
	Ted Needham	Labor	Western Australia	1920	1907–1920, 1923–1929	
	John Newlands	Labor	South Australia	1920	1913–1932	
	John Newlands	National Labor	South Australia	1920	1913–1932	
	John Newlands	Nationalist	South Australia	1920	1913–1932	
	David O'Keefe	Labor	Tasmania	1920	1901–1906, 1910–1920	
	James O'Loghlin	Labor	South Australia	1920	1907, 1913–1920, 1923–1925	
	George Pearce	Labor	Western Australia	1920	1901–1938	• Minister for Defence from 17 September 1914 to 21 December 1921 • Leader of the Government in the Senate from 17 September 1914 to 17 February 1917 • Deputy Leader of the Labor Party from 27 October 1915 to 14 November 1916 • Deputy Leader of the National Labor Party from 14 November 1916 to 17 February 1917
	George Pearce	National Labor	Western Australia	1920	1901–1938	• Minister for Defence from 17 September 1914 to 21 December 1921 • Leader of the Government in the Senate from 17 September 1914 to 17 February 1917 • Deputy Leader of the Labor Party from 27 October 1915 to 14 November 1916 • Deputy Leader of the National Labor Party from 14 November 1916 to 17 February 1917
	George Pearce	Nationalist	Western Australia	1920	1901–1938	• Minister for Defence from 17 September 1914 to 21 December 1921 • Leader of the Government in the Senate from 17 September 1914 to 17 February 1917 • Deputy Leader of the Labor Party from 27 October 1915 to 14 November 1916 • Deputy Leader of the National Labor Party from 14 November 1916 to 17 February 1917
	Rudolph Ready	Labor	Tasmania	1917	1910–1917	• Chief Labor Whip in the Senate 18 September 1914 to 8 May 1917 • Chief Government Whip in the Senate from 18 September 1914 to 14 November 1916 • Chief Opposition Whip in the Senate from 14 November 1914 to 8 May 1917
	James Rowell (Note: Nationalist senator William Story resigned on 24 April 1917 to run successfully for the House of Representatives seat of Boothby; on 24 May 1917 Nationalist James Rowell—who had been elected at the 5 May 1917 election for a term commencing on 1 July 1917—was appointed to replace him.)	Nationalist	South Australia	1917	1917–1923	
	Edward Russell	Labor	Victoria	1920	1907–1925	• Assistant Minister from 17 September 1914 to 17 February 1917 • Honorary Minister from 17 February 1917 to 27 March 1918
	Edward Russell	National Labor	Victoria	1920	1907–1925	• Assistant Minister from 17 September 1914 to 17 February 1917 • Honorary Minister from 17 February 1917 to 27 March 1918
	Edward Russell	Nationalist	Victoria	1920	1907–1925	• Assistant Minister from 17 September 1914 to 17 February 1917 • Honorary Minister from 17 February 1917 to 27 March 1918
	William Senior	Labor	South Australia	1917	1913–1923	
	William Senior	National Labor	South Australia	1917	1913–1923	
	William Senior	Nationalist	South Australia	1917	1913–1923	
	John Shannon	Liberal	South Australia	1920	1912–1913, 1914–1920	
	John Shannon	Nationalist	South Australia	1920	1912–1913, 1914–1920	
	James Stewart	Labor	Queensland	1917	1901–1917	
	William Story	Labor	South Australia	1917	1904–1917	
	William Story	National Labor	South Australia	1917	1904–1917	
	William Story	Nationalist	South Australia	1917	1904–1917	
	Harry Turley	Labor	Queensland	1917	1904–1917	
	David Watson	Labor	New South Wales	1917	1914–1917	
