= Members of the Australian House of Representatives, 1914–1917 =

Members of the Australian House of Representatives, 1914-1917
- ←1913-1914 1917-1919→

This is a list of the members of the Australian House of Representatives in the Sixth Australian Parliament, which was elected at the 1914 election on 5 September 1914.

There was a significant change in the party system during the Sixth Parliament. There was a split in the Australian Labor Party on 14 November 1916, when the then Prime Minister Billy Hughes walked out of a meeting of the Labor caucus over the issue of conscription along with twenty-four of his supporters, who were all then expelled from the party. Hughes and his followers became the informal "National Labor Party", which formed a minority government until merging with the Commonwealth Liberal Party on 17 February 1917 to form the Nationalist Party of Australia.

Images	Member	Party	Electorate	State	In office	Portfolio
	Percy Abbott	Liberal	New England	NSW	1913–1919	
	Percy Abbott	Nationalist	New England	NSW	1913–1919	
	Frank Anstey	Labor	Bourke	Vic	1910–1934	
	William Archibald	Labor	Hindmarsh	SA	1910–1919	• Minister for Home Affairs from 17 September 1914 to 27 October 1915 • Minister for Trade and Customs from 14 November 1916 to 17 February 1917
	William Archibald	National Labor	Hindmarsh	SA	1910–1919	• Minister for Home Affairs from 17 September 1914 to 27 October 1915 • Minister for Trade and Customs from 14 November 1916 to 17 February 1917
	William Archibald	Nationalist	Hindmarsh	SA	1910–1919	• Minister for Home Affairs from 17 September 1914 to 27 October 1915 • Minister for Trade and Customs from 14 November 1916 to 17 February 1917
	John Arthur	Labor	Bendigo	Vic	1913–1914	• Minister for External Affairs from 27 September 1914 to 9 December 1914
	Llewellyn Atkinson	Liberal	Wilmot	Tas	1906–1929	
	Llewellyn Atkinson	Nationalist	Wilmot	Tas	1906–1929	
	Fred Bamford	Labor	Herbert	Qld	1901–1925	• Minister for Home and Territories from 14 November 1916 to 17 February 1917
	Fred Bamford	National Labor	Herbert	Qld	1901–1925	• Minister for Home and Territories from 14 November 1916 to 17 February 1917
	Fred Bamford	Nationalist	Herbert	Qld	1901–1925	• Minister for Home and Territories from 14 November 1916 to 17 February 1917
	Sir Robert Best	Liberal	Kooyong	Vic	1910–1922	
	Sir Robert Best	Nationalist	Kooyong	Vic	1910–1922	
	James Boyd	Liberal	Henty	Vic	1913–1919	
	James Boyd	Nationalist	Henty	Vic	1913–1919	
	Frank Brennan	Labor	Batman	Vic	1911–1931, 1934–1949	
	Reginald Burchell	Labor	Fremantle	WA	1913–1922	• Chief National Labor Whip in the House from 14 November 1916 to 17 February 1917
	Reginald Burchell	National Labor	Fremantle	WA	1913–1922	• Chief National Labor Whip in the House from 14 November 1916 to 17 February 1917
	Reginald Burchell	Nationalist	Fremantle	WA	1913–1922	• Chief National Labor Whip in the House from 14 November 1916 to 17 February 1917
	George Burns	Labor	Illawarra	NSW	1913–1917	
	Ernest Carr	Labor	Macquarie	NSW	1906–1917	
	Ernest Carr	National Labor	Macquarie	NSW	1906–1917	
	Ernest Carr	Nationalist	Macquarie	NSW	1906–1917	
	James Catts	Labor	Cook	NSW	1906–1922	
	John Chanter	Labor	Riverina	NSW	1901–1903, 1904–1913, 1914–1922	• Chairman of Committees from 9 October 1914 to 6 November 1922
	John Chanter	National Labor	Riverina	NSW	1901–1903, 1904–1913, 1914–1922	• Chairman of Committees from 9 October 1914 to 6 November 1922
	John Chanter	Nationalist	Riverina	NSW	1901–1903, 1904–1913, 1914–1922	• Chairman of Committees from 9 October 1914 to 6 November 1922
	Austin Chapman	Liberal	Eden-Monaro	NSW	1901–1926	
	Austin Chapman	Nationalist	Eden-Monaro	NSW	1901–1926	
	Matthew Charlton	Labor	Hunter	NSW	1910–1928	
	Joseph Cook	Liberal	Parramatta	NSW	1901–1921	• Leader of the Opposition from 17 September 1914 to 17 February 1917 • Deputy Leader of the Nationalist Party from 17 February 1917 to 9 February 1923 • Minister for the Navy from 17 February 1917 to 28 July 1920
	Joseph Cook	Nationalist	Parramatta	NSW	1901–1921	• Leader of the Opposition from 17 September 1914 to 17 February 1917 • Deputy Leader of the Nationalist Party from 17 February 1917 to 9 February 1923 • Minister for the Navy from 17 February 1917 to 28 July 1920
	Edward Corser	Liberal	Wide Bay	Qld	1915–1928	
	Edward Corser	Nationalist	Wide Bay	Qld	1915–1928	
	George Dankel	Labor	Boothby	SA	1913–1917	
	George Dankel	National Labor	Boothby	SA	1913–1917	
	George Dankel	Nationalist	Boothby	SA	1913–1917	
	James Fenton	Labor	Maribyrnong	Vic	1910–1934	
	William Finlayson	Labor	Brisbane	Qld	1910–1919	
	Andrew Fisher	Labor	Wide Bay	Qld	1901–1915	• Prime Minister from 17 September 1914 to 27 October 1915 • Leader of the Labor Party from 30 October 1907 to 72 October 1915 • Treasurer from 17 September 1914 to 27 October 1915
	William Fleming	Liberal	Robertson	NSW	1913–1922	
	William Fleming	Nationalist	Robertson	NSW	1913–1922	
	Sir John Forrest	Liberal	Swan	WA	1901–1918	• Treasurer from 17 February 1917 to 27 March 1918
	Sir John Forrest	Nationalist	Swan	WA	1901–1918	• Treasurer from 17 February 1917 to 27 March 1918
	Richard Foster	Liberal	Wakefield	SA	1909–1928	
	Richard Foster	Nationalist	Wakefield	SA	1909–1928	
	James Fowler	Liberal	Perth	WA	1901–1922	
	James Fowler	Nationalist	Perth	WA	1901–1922	
	Paddy Glynn	Liberal	Angas	SA	1901–1919	• Minister for Home and Territories from 17 February 1917 to 3 February 1920
	Paddy Glynn	Nationalist	Angas	SA	1901–1919	• Minister for Home and Territories from 17 February 1917 to 3 February 1920
	Henry Gregory	Liberal	Dampier	WA	1913–1940	
	Henry Gregory	Nationalist	Dampier	WA	1913–1940	
	Littleton Groom	Liberal	Darling Downs	Qld	1901–1929, 1931–1936	• Honorary Minister from 17 February 1917 to 10 January 1918
	Littleton Groom	Nationalist	Darling Downs	Qld	1901–1929, 1931–1936	• Honorary Minister from 17 February 1917 to 10 January 1918
	Alfred Hampson	Labor	Bendigo	Vic	1915–1917	
	Joseph Hannan	Labor	Fawkner	Vic	1913–1917	
	William Higgs	Labor	Capricornia	Qld	1910–1922	• Treasurer from 27 October 1915 to 14 November 1916
	Robert Howe	Labor	Dalley	NSW	1910–1915	
	Billy Hughes	Labor	West Sydney	NSW	1901–1952	• Deputy Leader of the Labor Party from 18 September 1914 to 27 October 1915 • Attorney-General from 17 September 1914 to 21 December 1921 • Prime Minister from 27 October 1915 to 9 February 1923 • Leader of the Labor Party from 27 October 1915 to 14 November 1916 • Minister for Trade and Customs from 29 September 1916 to 14 November 1916 • Leader of the National labor Party from 14 November 1916 to 17 February 1917 • Leader of the Nationalist Party from 17 February 1917 to 9 February 1923
	Billy Hughes	National Labor	West Sydney	NSW	1901–1952	• Deputy Leader of the Labor Party from 18 September 1914 to 27 October 1915 • Attorney-General from 17 September 1914 to 21 December 1921 • Prime Minister from 27 October 1915 to 9 February 1923 • Leader of the Labor Party from 27 October 1915 to 14 November 1916 • Minister for Trade and Customs from 29 September 1916 to 14 November 1916 • Leader of the National labor Party from 14 November 1916 to 17 February 1917 • Leader of the Nationalist Party from 17 February 1917 to 9 February 1923
	Billy Hughes	Nationalist	West Sydney	NSW	1901–1952	• Deputy Leader of the Labor Party from 18 September 1914 to 27 October 1915 • Attorney-General from 17 September 1914 to 21 December 1921 • Prime Minister from 27 October 1915 to 9 February 1923 • Leader of the Labor Party from 27 October 1915 to 14 November 1916 • Minister for Trade and Customs from 29 September 1916 to 14 November 1916 • Leader of the National labor Party from 14 November 1916 to 17 February 1917 • Leader of the Nationalist Party from 17 February 1917 to 9 February 1923
	Sir William Irvine	Liberal	Flinders	Vic	1906–1918	
	Sir William Irvine	Nationalist	Flinders	Vic	1906–1918	
	Jens Jensen	Labor	Bass	Tas	1910–1919	• Assistant Minister from 17 September 1914 to 12 July 1915 • Minister for the Navy from 12 July 1915 to 17 February 1917 • Minister for Trade and Customs from 17 February 1917 to 13 December 1918
	Jens Jensen	National Labor	Bass	Tas	1910–1919	• Assistant Minister from 17 September 1914 to 12 July 1915 • Minister for the Navy from 12 July 1915 to 17 February 1917 • Minister for Trade and Customs from 17 February 1917 to 13 December 1918
	Jens Jensen	Nationalist	Bass	Tas	1910–1919	• Assistant Minister from 17 September 1914 to 12 July 1915 • Minister for the Navy from 12 July 1915 to 17 February 1917 • Minister for Trade and Customs from 17 February 1917 to 13 December 1918
	Elliot Johnson	Liberal	Lang	NSW	1903–1928	
	Elliot Johnson	Nationalist	Lang	NSW	1903–1928	
	Edward Jolley	Labor	Grampians	Vic	1914–1915	
	Willie Kelly	Liberal	Wentworth	NSW	1903–1919	
	Willie Kelly	Nationalist	Wentworth	NSW	1903–1919	
	John Livingston	Liberal	Barker	SA	1906–1922	
	John Livingston	Nationalist	Barker	SA	1906–1922	
	John Lynch	Labor	Werriwa	NSW	1914–1919	
	John Lynch	National Labor	Werriwa	NSW	1914–1919	
	John Lynch	Nationalist	Werriwa	NSW	1914–1919	
	Hugh Mahon	Labor	Kalgoorlie	WA	1901–1917, 1919–1920	• Assistant Minister from 17 September 1914 to 14 December 1914 • Minister for External Affairs from 9 December 1914 to 27 October 1916
	William Mahony	Labor	Dalley	NSW	1915–1927	
	William Maloney	Labor	Melbourne	Vic	1904–1940	
	Chester Manifold	Liberal	Corangamite	Vic	1901–1903, 1913–1918	
	Chester Manifold	Nationalist	Corangamite	Vic	1901–1903, 1913–1918	
	Walter Massy-Greene	Liberal	Richmond	NSW	1910–1922	• Chief Government Whip in the House from 13 June 1917 to 26 March 1918
	Walter Massy-Greene	Nationalist	Richmond	NSW	1910–1922	• Chief Government Whip in the House from 13 June 1917 to 26 March 1918
	James Mathews	Labor	Melbourne Ports	Vic	1906–1931	
	Charles McDonald	Labor	Kennedy	Qld	1901–1925	• Speaker of the House of Representatives from 8 October 1914 to 26 March 1917
	Charles McGrath	Labor	Ballarat	Vic	1913–1919, 1920–1934	
	William McWilliams	Liberal	Franklin	Tas	1903–1922, 1928–1929	
	William McWilliams	Nationalist	Franklin	Tas	1903–1922, 1928–1929	
	Parker Moloney	Labor	Indi	Vic	1910–1913, 1914–1917, 1919–1931	
	King O'Malley	Labor	Darwin	Tas	1901–1917	• Minister for Home Affairs from 27 October 1915 to 14 November 1916
	Richard Orchard	Liberal	Nepean	NSW	1913–1919	
	Richard Orchard	Nationalist	Nepean	NSW	1913–1919	
	Alfred Ozanne	Labor	Corio	Vic	1910–1913, 1914–1917	
	Jim Page	Labor	Maranoa	Qld	1901–1921	• Chief Government Whip in the House from 17 September 1914 to 14 November 1916 • Chief Labor Whip in the House from 8 July 1913 to 3 June 1921 • Chief Opposition Whip in the House from 14 November 1916 to 3 June 1921
	Albert Palmer	Liberal	Echuca	Vic	1906–1919	
	Albert Palmer	Nationalist	Echuca	Vic	1906–1919	
	Robert Patten	Liberal	Hume	NSW	1913–1917	
	Robert Patten	Nationalist	Hume	NSW	1913–1917	
	Henry Pigott	Liberal	Calare	NSW	1913–1919	
	Henry Pigott	Nationalist	Calare	NSW	1913–1919	
	Alexander Poynton	Labor	Grey	SA	1901–1922	• Treasurer from 14 November 1916 to 17 February 1917
	Alexander Poynton	National Labor	Grey	SA	1901–1922	• Treasurer from 14 November 1916 to 17 February 1917
	Alexander Poynton	Nationalist	Grey	SA	1901–1922	• Treasurer from 14 November 1916 to 17 February 1917
	Edward Riley	Labor	South Sydney	NSW	1910–1931	
	Arthur Rodgers	Liberal	Wannon	Vic	1913–1922, 1925–1929	
	Arthur Rodgers	Nationalist	Wannon	Vic	1913–1922, 1925–1929	
	Granville Ryrie	Liberal	North Sydney	NSW	1911–1927	
	Granville Ryrie	Nationalist	North Sydney	NSW	1911–1927	
	Carty Salmon	Nationalist	Grampians	Vic	1901–1913, 1915–1917	
	Sydney Sampson	Liberal	Wimmera	Vic	1906–1919	
	Sydney Sampson	Nationalist	Wimmera	Vic	1906–1919	
	James Sharpe	Labor	Oxley	Qld	1913–1917	
	Hugh Sinclair	Liberal	Moreton	Qld	1906–1919	
	Hugh Sinclair	Nationalist	Moreton	Qld	1906–1919	
	Bruce Smith	Liberal	Parkes	NSW	1901–1919	
	Bruce Smith	Nationalist	Parkes	NSW	1901–1919	
	William Laird Smith	Labor	Denison	Tas	1910–1922	• Assistant Minister from 14 November 1916 to 17 February 1917
	William Laird Smith	National Labor	Denison	Tas	1910–1922	• Assistant Minister from 14 November 1916 to 17 February 1917
	William Laird Smith	Nationalist	Denison	Tas	1910–1922	• Assistant Minister from 14 November 1916 to 17 February 1917
	William Spence	Labor	Darling	NSW	1901–1917, 1917–1919	• Postmaster-General from 17 September 1914 to 27 October 1915 • Vice-President of the Executive Council from 14 November 1916 to 17 February 1917
	William Spence	National Labor	Darling	NSW	1901–1917, 1917–1919	• Postmaster-General from 17 September 1914 to 27 October 1915 • Vice-President of the Executive Council from 14 November 1916 to 17 February 1917
	William Spence	Nationalist	Darling	NSW	1901–1917, 1917–1919	• Postmaster-General from 17 September 1914 to 27 October 1915 • Vice-President of the Executive Council from 14 November 1916 to 17 February 1917
	Jacob Stumm	Liberal	Lilley	Qld	1913–1917	
	Jacob Stumm	Nationalist	Lilley	Qld	1913–1917	
	Josiah Thomas	Labor	Barrier	NSW	1901–1917	
	Josiah Thomas	National Labor	Barrier	NSW	1901–1917	
	Josiah Thomas	Nationalist	Barrier	NSW	1901–1917	
	John Thomson	Liberal	Cowper	NSW	1906–1919	• Chief Ministerial Whip in the House from 13 June 1917 to 26 March 1918
	John Thomson	Nationalist	Cowper	NSW	1906–1919	• Chief Ministerial Whip in the House from 13 June 1917 to 26 March 1918
	Frank Tudor	Labor	Yarra	Vic	1901–1922	• Minister for Trade and Customs from 17 September 1914 to 14 September 1916 • Leader of the Opposition from 14 November 1916 to 10 January 1922 • Leader of the Labor Party from 14 November 1916 to 10 January 1922
	David Watkins	Labor	Newcastle	NSW	1901–1935	
	William Watt	Liberal	Balaclava	Vic	1914–1929	• Minister for Works and Railways from 17 February 1917 to 27 March 1918
	William Watt	Nationalist	Balaclava	Vic	1914–1929	• Minister for Works and Railways from 17 February 1917 to 27 March 1918
	William Webster	Labor	Gwydir	NSW	1903–1919	• Postmaster-General from 27 October 1915 to 3 February 1920
	William Webster	National Labor	Gwydir	NSW	1903–1919	• Postmaster-General from 27 October 1915 to 3 February 1920
	William Webster	Nationalist	Gwydir	NSW	1903–1919	• Postmaster-General from 27 October 1915 to 3 February 1920
	John West	Labor	East Sydney	NSW	1910–1931	
	George Wise	Independent	Gippsland	Vic	1906–1913, 1914–1922	
	George Wise	Nationalist	Gippsland	Vic	1906–1913, 1914–1922	
	George Edwin Yates	Labor	Adelaide	SA	1914–1919, 1922–1931	
