= Hughes Ministry =

Hughes Ministry may refer to:

- First Hughes Ministry
- Second Hughes Ministry
- Third Hughes Ministry
- Fourth Hughes Ministry
- Fifth Hughes Ministry
