= First Hughes ministry =

12th ministry of the government of Australia

- 11th Ministry of Australia

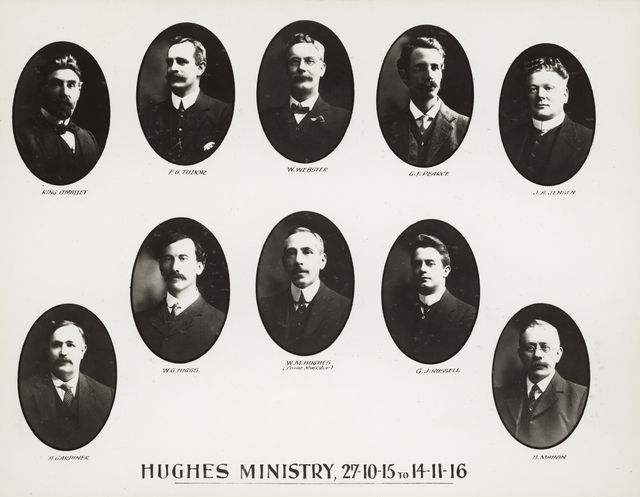
- Photo of the First Hughes ministry
- Date formed: 27 October 1915
- Date dissolved: 14 November 1916

People and organisations
- Monarch: George V
- Governor-General: Sir Ronald Munro Ferguson
- Prime Minister: Billy Hughes
- No. of ministers: 10
- Member party: Labor
- Status in legislature: Majority government
- Opposition party: Liberal
- Opposition leader: Joseph Cook

History
- Legislature term: 6th
- Predecessor: Third Fisher ministry
- Successor: Second Hughes ministry

The First Hughes ministry (Labor) was the 11th ministry of the Government of Australia. It was led by the country's 7th Prime Minister, Billy Hughes. The First Hughes ministry succeeded the Third Fisher ministry, which dissolved on 27 October 1915 following Andrew Fisher's retirement from Parliament to become the next High Commissioner to the United Kingdom. The ministry was replaced by the Second Hughes ministry on 14 November 1916 following the split that took place within Labor over the issue of conscription. This led to Hughes and his supporters leaving the party to form the National Labor Party.

King O'Malley, who died in 1953, was the last surviving member of the First Hughes ministry; O'Malley was also the last surviving member of the Second Fisher ministry.

== Ministry ==
Party	Minister	Portrait	Portfolio
Labor	Billy Hughes (1862–1952) MP for West Sydney (1901–1917)		Prime Minister; Leader of the Labor Party; Attorney-General; Minister for Trade and Customs (from 29 September 1916)
Labor	William Higgs (1862–1951) MP for Capricornia (1910–1922)		Treasurer (to 27 October 1916)
Labor	King O'Malley (1858–1953) MP for Darwin (1903–1917)		Minister for Home Affairs
Labor	Hugh Mahon (1857–1931) MP for Kalgoorlie (1913–1917)		Minister for External Affairs
Labor	Frank Tudor (1866–1922) MP for Yarra (1901–1922)		Minister for Trade and Customs (to 14 September 1916)
Labor	George Pearce (1870–1952) Senator for Western Australia (1901–1938)		Deputy Leader of the Labor Party; Minister for Defence; Leader of the Government in the Senate
Labor	Jens Jensen (1865–1936) MP for Bass (1910–1919)		Minister for the Navy
Labor	William Webster (1860–1936) MP for Gwydir (1903–1919)		Postmaster-General
Labor	Albert Gardiner (1867–1952) Senator for New South Wales (1910–1926)		Vice-President of the Executive Council (to 27 October 1916)
Labor	Edward Russell (1878–1925) Senator for Victoria (1907–1925)		Assistant Minister (to 27 October 1916)
