= David Watson (New South Wales politician) =

Australian politician

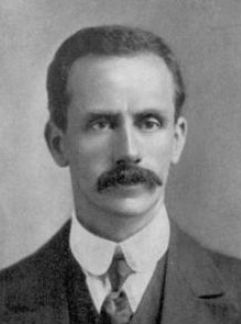

Senator for New South Wales
- In office 5 September 1914 – 30 June 1917

Personal details
- Born: 14 February 1870 Lanarkshire, Scotland
- Died: 4 December 1924 (aged 54)
- Party: Australian Labor Party
- Occupation: Miner

David Watson (14 February 1870 – 4 December 1924) was a Scottish-born Australian politician. He was an Australian Labor Party member of the Australian Senate from 1914 to 1917, representing the state of New South Wales.

Watson was born in Rutherglen in Scotland, and migrated to Australia at 15, settling in the Newcastle suburb of Lambton. He was a miner there for sixteen years, spent some years with the Australian Baptist Home Mission in the Dungog area, then returned to mining at Newcastle. Watson was working in the Pelaw-Main Colliery when he became president of the Northern District Miners' Union during the 1909 miners' strike, succeeding Peter Bowling. He remained in the role until his election to the Senate, with the abolition of the afternoon shift in the mines being a major achievement during this time. Watson was also a long-term temperance advocate and Baptist lay preacher. He was an unsuccessful candidate for the Senate at the 1913 federal election.

In the federal double dissolution election of 1914, Watson was elected to the Australian Senate, for a 3-year term, as a Labor Senator from New South Wales. He campaigned against conscription during the 1916 and 1917 referendums. In March 1917, amidst the fallout of the 1916 Labor split, he alleged on the floor of the Senate that Prime Minister Billy Hughes and Senators George Pearce and Thomas Givens had attempted to bribe him to join their new National Labor Party, which was furiously denied. Hughes subsequently sued him for slander, which after a high-profile months-long legal battle in the Supreme Court of Victoria was settled in October 1917. Watson lost his seat in the election of 1917.

Following his Senate defeat, he turned to full-time temperance organising, initially in Victoria and Queensland before moving to Sydney c. 1921 to head up the field staff for temperance organisation the New South Wales Alliance. He frequently toured the country speaking in support of prohibition of alcohol in these roles until his death. He attempted to make a political comeback at the 1922 state election, but was defeated.

He died at Lewisham Hospital in December 1924 after experiencing complications from a surgical procedure. He was buried in the Baptist section of Sandgate Cemetery.
