= Second Hughes ministry =

12th ministry of Government of Australia

- 12th Ministry of Australia

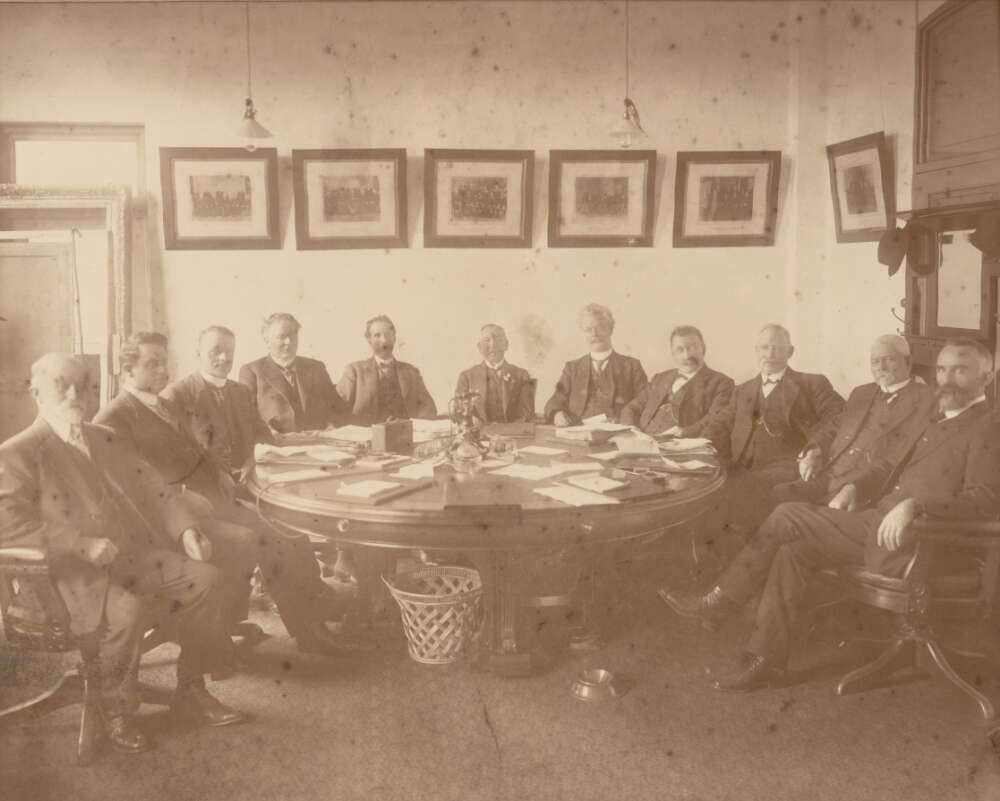
- Group photo of the Second Hughes ministry
- Date formed: 14 November 1916
- Date dissolved: 17 February 1917

People and organisations
- Monarch: George V
- Governor-General: Sir Ronald Munro Ferguson
- Prime Minister: Billy Hughes
- No. of ministers: 11
- Member party: National Labor
- Status in legislature: Minority government (Liberal support)
- Opposition party: Labor
- Opposition leader: Frank Tudor (Note: Joseph Cook, the leader of the Liberals, officially remained opposition leader because his party stayed on the opposition benches until merging with Hughes’s party.)

History
- Legislature term: 6th
- Predecessor: First Hughes ministry
- Successor: Third Hughes ministry

The Second Hughes ministry (National Labor) was the 12th ministry of the Government of Australia. It was led by the country's 7th Prime Minister, Billy Hughes. The Second Hughes ministry succeeded the First Hughes ministry, which dissolved on 14 November 1916 following the split that took place within the governing Labor Party over the issue of conscription. This led to Hughes and his supporters leaving the party to form the National Labor Party, which swiftly received parliamentary support from Joseph Cook and the Liberal Party. The ministry was replaced by the Third Hughes ministry on 17 February 1917 after National Labor and Commonwealth Liberal merged into the Nationalist Party.

Billy Hughes, who died in 1952, was the last surviving member of the Second Hughes ministry; Hughes was also the last surviving member of the Watson ministry, First Fisher ministry, Third Fisher ministry and Third Hughes ministry.

== Ministry ==
Party	Minister	Portrait	Portfolio
National Labor	Billy Hughes (1862–1952) MP for West Sydney (1901–1917)		Prime Minister; Leader of the National Labor Party; Attorney-General
National Labor	Alexander Poynton (1853–1935) MP for Grey (1903–1922)		Treasurer
National Labor	Fred Bamford (1849–1934) MP for Herbert (1901–1925)		Minister for Home and Territories
National Labor	George Pearce (1870–1952) Senator for Western Australia (1901–1938)		Deputy Leader of the National Labor Party; Minister for Defence; Leader of the Government in the Senate
National Labor	Jens Jensen (1865–1936) MP for Bass (1910–1919)		Minister for the Navy
National Labor	Patrick Lynch (1867–1944) Senator for Western Australia (1907–1938)		Minister for Works and Railways
National Labor	William Archibald (1850–1926) MP for Hindmarsh (1910–1919)		Minister for Trade and Customs
National Labor	William Webster (1860–1936) MP for Gwydir (1903–1919)		Postmaster-General
National Labor	William Spence (1846–1926) MP for Darling (1901–1917)		Vice-President of the Executive Council
National Labor	Edward Russell (1878–1925) Senator for Victoria (1907–1925)		Assistant Minister
National Labor	William Laird Smith (1869–1942) MP for Denison (1910–1922)		Assistant Minister
