= 1917 Australian federal election =

Election for the 7th Parliament of Australia

- 5 May 1917

All 75 seats in the House of Representatives 38 seats were needed for a majority in the House 18 (of the 36) seats in the Senate
- Registered: 2,835,327 ▲0.85%
- Turnout: 1,934,478 (78.30%) (Note: Turnout in contested seats) (▲4.77 pp)
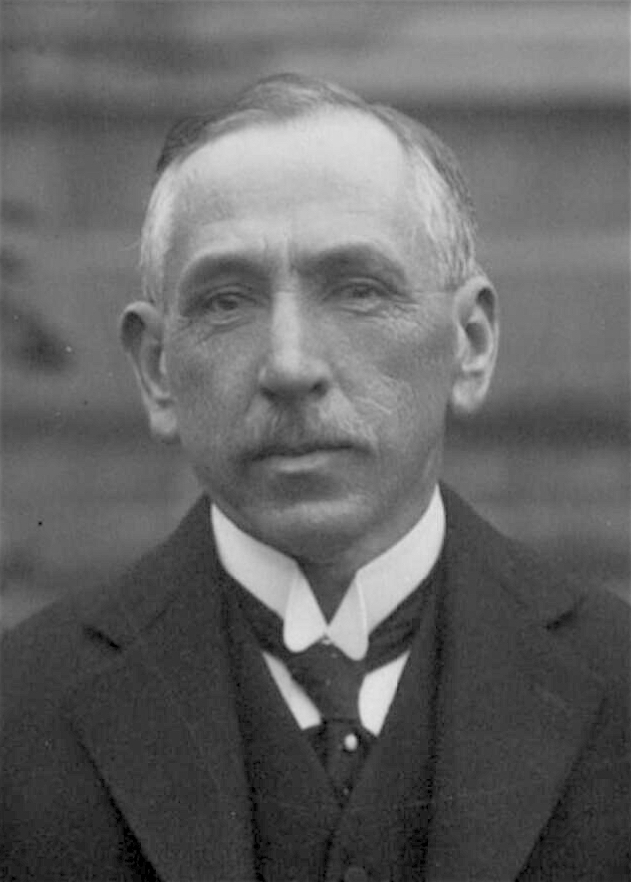

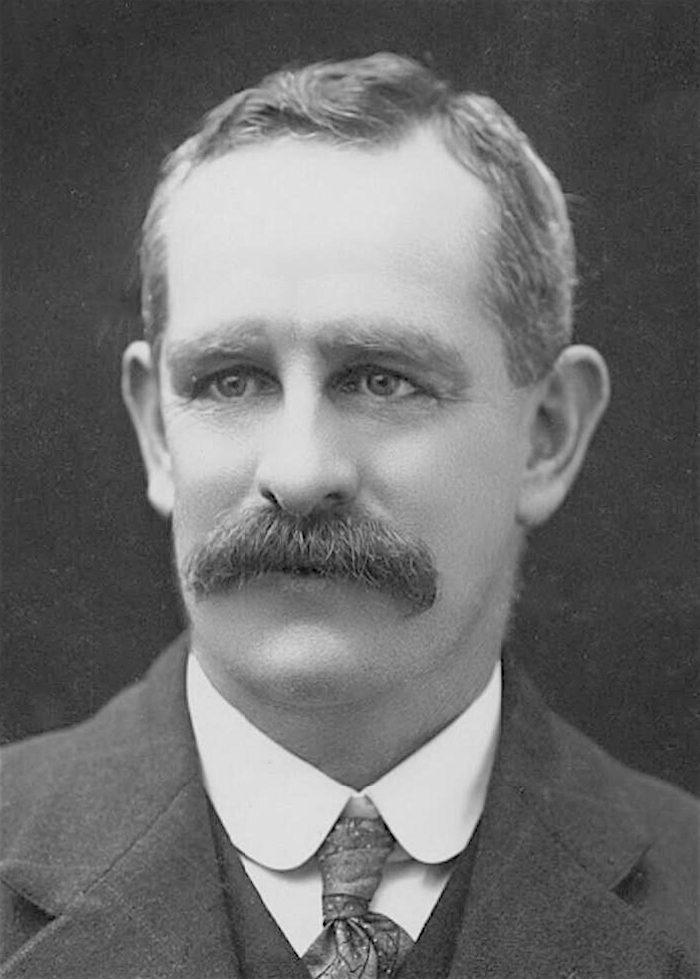
	First party	Second party
Leader	Billy Hughes	Frank Tudor
Party	Nationalist	Labor
Leader since	17 February 1917	14 November 1916
Leader's seat	West Sydney (NSW) won Bendigo (Vic.)	Yarra (Vic.)
Last election	32 seats	42 seats
Seats won	53 seats	22 seats
Seat change	▲21	▼20
Popular vote	1,021,138	827,541
Percentage	54.22%	43.94%
Swing	▲7.01%	▼6.95%
- Results by division for the House of Representatives, shaded by winning party's margin of victory.
Prime Minister before election
Billy Hughes
Nationalist
Subsequent Prime Minister
Billy Hughes
Nationalist

The 1917 Australian federal election was held in Australia on 5 May 1917. All 75 seats in the House of Representatives and 18 of the 36 seats in the Senate were up for election. The incumbent Nationalist Party, led by Prime Minister Billy Hughes, defeated the opposition Labor Party led by Frank Tudor in a landslide.

Hughes, at the time a member of the ALP, had become prime minister when Andrew Fisher retired in 1915. The Australian Labor Party split of 1916 over the conscription issue had led Hughes and 24 other pro-conscription Labor MPs to split off as the National Labor Party, which was able to form a minority government supported by the Commonwealth Liberal Party under Joseph Cook. Later that year, National Labor and the Liberals merged to form the Nationalist Party, with Hughes as leader and Cook as deputy leader. The election was fought in the aftermath of the 1916 plebiscite on conscription, which had been narrowly defeated. The Nationalists won a decisive victory, securing the largest majority government since Federation. The ALP suffered a large electoral swing against it, losing almost seven percentage points of its vote share compared with 1914. The swing was magnified by the large number of former Labor MPs who followed Hughes out of the party. This election would be the last federal election using the first past the post election system as Australia switched to the preferential voting system in 1919.

== Background ==
=== Labor split and aftermath ===
In November 1916 the ALP formally split over the issue of conscription, following the referendum defeat of the government's proposal to require conscript soldiers to serve overseas. Hughes and his supporters were expelled from the ALP and formed a separate National Labor Party (NLP), continuing to govern in minority with the support of the Liberal Party despite holding only 16 out of 75 seats in the House. The remnant ALP, now led by Frank Tudor, retained its Senate majority, making the passage of legislation difficult.

Discussions around an alliance between the NLP and the Liberals began shortly after the split. Although Hughes would have preferred a national unity government of all parties, the ALP was unwilling to co-operate and by mid-December 1916 Hughes had accepted the principle that Liberals would have to join his cabinet. Negotiations between Hughes and Liberal leader Joseph Cook lasted for a couple of months, with terms finally agreed by Hughes on 31 January 1917 and approved by the Liberal Party. A new coalition ministry was sworn in on 17 February, with Cook taking the second rank in cabinet and the Liberals gaining five out of the nine portfolios.

=== Attempted postponement ===
Hughes had initially planned to call an election for April or May 1917 to allow him to attend the Imperial War Cabinet and Imperial War Conference in London. However, at the urging of the Liberals, a plan was instead developed to postpone the election – "until October 1918 or six months after the end of the war, whichever was sooner". As this would have violated section 28 of the constitution, the government sought to prolong the parliament by petitioning the British government to directly amend the Commonwealth of Australia Constitution Act 1900 and thereby circumvent the standard referendum process for constitutional amendments. This mechanism was viewed by some in Australia as legally permissible prior to the adoption of the Statute of Westminster 1931.

Hughes received advice from the British government that a joint resolution of the Australian parliament would be necessary before the British parliament could consider the matter. He succeeded in passing a resolution through the House, but faced difficulties in the Senate where the ALP still held a majority. Hughes was accused by some opponents of improperly influencing ALP senators to miss the vote – as with James Guy, James Long, and David Watson – or resign from the Senate altogether, as with Rudolph Ready. The postponement of the election was ultimately thwarted when Liberal senators Thomas Bakhap and John Keating crossed the floor to vote against the resolution.

Hughes eventually advised Governor-General Ronald Munro Ferguson to dissolve parliament on 23 March 1917 with the election date set for 5 May. He was consequently unable to attend the Imperial War Cabinet.

== Results ==
=== House of Representatives ===
House of Reps 1917–1919 (FPTP) – Turnout 78.30% (Non-CV) – Informal 2.64%
Party	Votes	%	Swing	Seats	Change
Nationalist	1,021,138	54.22	+7.01	53	+21
Labor	827,541	43.94	–6.96	22	–20
Independents	34,755	1.85	−0.05	0	–1
Total	1,883,434			75	
Nationalist	Win			53	+21
Labor				22	−20

Notes

- Ten members were elected unopposed – seven Nationalist and three Labor.
- The changes recorded for the Nationalist Party are with regard to the Commonwealth Liberal Party's performance in 1914.

Popular vote
Nationalist	54.22%
Labor	43.94%
Independent	1.85%

Parliament seats
Nationalist	70.67%
Labor	29.33%

=== Senate ===
Senate 1917–1919 (FPTP BV) – Turnout 77.69% (Non-CV) – Informal N/A
Party	Votes	%	Swing	Seats won	Seats held	Change
Nationalist	3,516,354	55.37	+7.60	18	24	+18
Labor	2,776,648	43.72	−8.42	0	12	−18
Socialist Labor	32,692	0.51	+0.51	0	0	0
Independents	24,676	0.39	+0.39	0	0	0
Total	6,350,370			18	36	

Notes

- The changes recorded for the Nationalist Party are with regard to the Commonwealth Liberal Party's performance in 1914.

== Seats changing hands ==
Seat	Pre-1917			Swing	Post-1917		
Seat	Party	Member	Margin	Swing	Margin	Member	Party
Bass, Tas	Labor	Jens Jensen	6.0	15.9	9.9	Jens Jensen	Nationalist
Bendigo, Vic	Labor	Alfred Hampson	0.9	12.5	7.4	Billy Hughes	Nationalist
Boothby, SA	Labor	George Dankel	5.3	19.8	14.5	William Story	Nationalist
Corio, Vic	Labor	Alfred Ozanne	1.2	8.5	7.3	John Lister	Nationalist
Darwin, Tas	Labor	King O'Malley	6.1	14.9	8.8	Charles Howroyd	Nationalist
Denison, Tas	Labor	William Laird Smith	5.9	12.2	6.3	William Laird Smith	Nationalist
Fawkner, Vic	Labor	Joseph Hannan	9.3	10.7	N/A	George Maxwell	Nationalist
Fremantle, WA	Labor	Reginald Burchell	6.3	25.2	18.9	Reginald Burchell	Nationalist
Gippsland, Vic	Independent	George Wise	1.0	24.7	22.7	George Wise	Nationalist
Grey, SA	Labor	Alexander Poynton	4.0	11.7	7.7	Alexander Poynton	Nationalist
Gwydir, NSW	Labor	William Webster	3.8	10.3	6.5	William Webster	Nationalist
Herbert, Qld	Labor	Fred Bamford	14.4	15.7	1.3	Fred Bamford	Nationalist
Hindmarsh, SA	Labor	William Archibald	24.4	30.2	5.8	William Archibald	Nationalist
Illawarra, NSW	Labor	George Burns	4.2	8.5	4.3	Hector Lamond	Nationalist
Indi, Vic	Labor	Parker Moloney	1.0	7.2	6.2	John Leckie	Nationalist
Kalgoorlie, WA	Labor	Hugh Mahon	100.0	51.3	1.3	Edward Heitmann	Nationalist
Oxley, Qld	Labor	James Sharpe	6.8	9.6	2.3	James Bayley	Nationalist
Werriwa, NSW	Labor	John Lynch	0.0	2.8	2.8	John Lynch	Nationalist

- Members listed in italics did not contest their seat at this election.

== Post-election pendulum ==
Government seats
Nationalist Party
Marginal
Moreton (Qld)	Hugh Sinclair	NAT	00.1
Angas (SA)	Paddy Glynn	NAT	00.8
Kalgoorlie (WA)	Edward Heitmann	NAT	01.3
Herbert (Qld)	Fred Bamford	NAT	01.3
Fawkner (Vic)	George Maxwell	NAT	01.4
Calare (NSW)	Henry Pigott	NAT	01.8
Hume (NSW)	Franc Falkiner	NAT	01.9
Werriwa (NSW)	John Lynch	NAT	02.8
Oxley (Qld)	James Bayley	NAT	02.8
Wide Bay (Qld)	Edward Corser	NAT	02.9
Illawarra (NSW)	Hector Lamond	NAT	04.3
Wannon (Vic)	Arthur Rodgers	NAT	04.8
Hindmarsh (SA)	William Archibald	NAT	05.8
Fairly safe
Darling Downs (Qld)	Littleton Groom	NAT	06.1
Robertson (NSW)	William Fleming	NAT	06.2
Wakefield (SA)	Richard Foster	NAT	06.2
Indi (Vic)	John Leckie	NAT	06.2
Denison (Tas)	William Laird Smith	NAT	06.3
Gwydir (NSW)	William Webster	NAT	06.5
Grampians (Vic)	Carty Salmon	NAT	07.0
Eden-Monaro (NSW)	Austin Chapman	NAT	07.2
Corio (Vic)	John Lister	NAT	07.3
Bendigo (Vic)	Billy Hughes	NAT	07.4
Grey (SA)	Alexander Poynton	NAT	07.7
Darwin (Tas)	Charles Howroyd	NAT	08.8
Riverina (NSW)	John Chanter	NAT	09.2 vs IND
Bass (Tas)	Alexander Poynton	NAT	09.9
Safe
Corangamite (Vic)	Chester Manifold	NAT	10.4
Lang (NSW)	Elliot Johnson	NAT	10.4
Nepean (NSW)	Richard Orchard	NAT	10.5
Echuca (Vic)	Albert Palmer	NAT	10.7
Flinders (Vic)	William Irvine	NAT	11.2
Lilley (Qld)	George Mackay	NAT	12.7
Barker (SA)	John Livingston	NAT	13.9
Wilmot (Tas)	Llewellyn Atkinson	NAT	14.2
Boothby (SA)	William Story	NAT	14.5
Parkes (NSW)	Bruce Smith	NAT	15.4
Balaclava (Vic)	William Watt	NAT	16.6
Wentworth (NSW)	Willie Kelly	NAT	18.5
Fremantle (WA)	Reginald Burchell	NAT	18.9
Perth (WA)	James Fowler	NAT	19.5
Very safe
Henty (Vic)	James Boyd	NAT	20.6
Dampier (WA)	Henry Gregory	NAT	21.4
Gippsland (Vic)	George Wise	NAT	22.7
Parramatta (NSW)	Joseph Cook	NAT	23.8 vs IND
Richmond (NSW)	Walter Massy-Greene	NAT	25.2
Cowper (NSW)	John Thomson	NAT	unopposed
Franklin (Tas)	William McWilliams	NAT	unopposed
Kooyong (Vic)	Robert Best	NAT	unopposed
New England (NSW)	Percy Abbott	NAT	unopposed
North Sydney (NSW)	Granville Ryrie	NAT	unopposed
Swan (WA)	John Forrest	NAT	unopposed
Wimmera (Vic)	Sydney Sampson	NAT	unopposed

Non-government seats
Australian Labor Party
Marginal
Macquarie (NSW)	Samuel Nicholls	ALP	00.0
Brisbane (Qld)	William Finlayson	ALP	00.0
Maribyrnong (Vic)	James Fenton	ALP	02.2
Capricornia (Qld)	William Higgs	ALP	02.3
Barrier (NSW)	Michael Considine	ALP	02.5 vs IND
Darling (NSW)	Arthur Blakeley	ALP	03.3
Hunter (NSW)	Matthew Charlton	ALP	03.4
Dalley (NSW)	William Mahony	ALP	04.0
Bourke (Vic)	Frank Anstey	ALP	04.5
Maranoa (Qld)	Jim Page	ALP	04.8
Fairly safe
Newcastle (NSW)	David Watkins	ALP	08.0
Safe
Melbourne (Vic)	William Maloney	ALP	10.3
Batman (Vic)	Frank Brennan	ALP	10.9
Kennedy (Qld)	Charles McDonald	ALP	12.8
South Sydney (NSW)	Edward Riley	ALP	13.3
Cook (NSW)	James Catts	ALP	14.4
Melbourne Ports (Vic)	James Mathews	ALP	16.3
West Sydney (NSW)	Con Wallace	ALP	16.5
Very safe
Yarra (Vic)	Frank Tudor	ALP	21.3
Adelaide (SA)	George Edwin Yates	ALP	unopposed
Ballaarat (Vic)	Charles McGrath	ALP	unopposed
East Sydney (NSW)	John West	ALP	unopposed

== See also ==
- Candidates of the 1917 Australian federal election
- Members of the Australian House of Representatives, 1917–1919
- Members of the Australian Senate, 1917–1920
