= Patrick Lynch (Australian politician) =

Australian politician

The Honourable Patrick Lynch
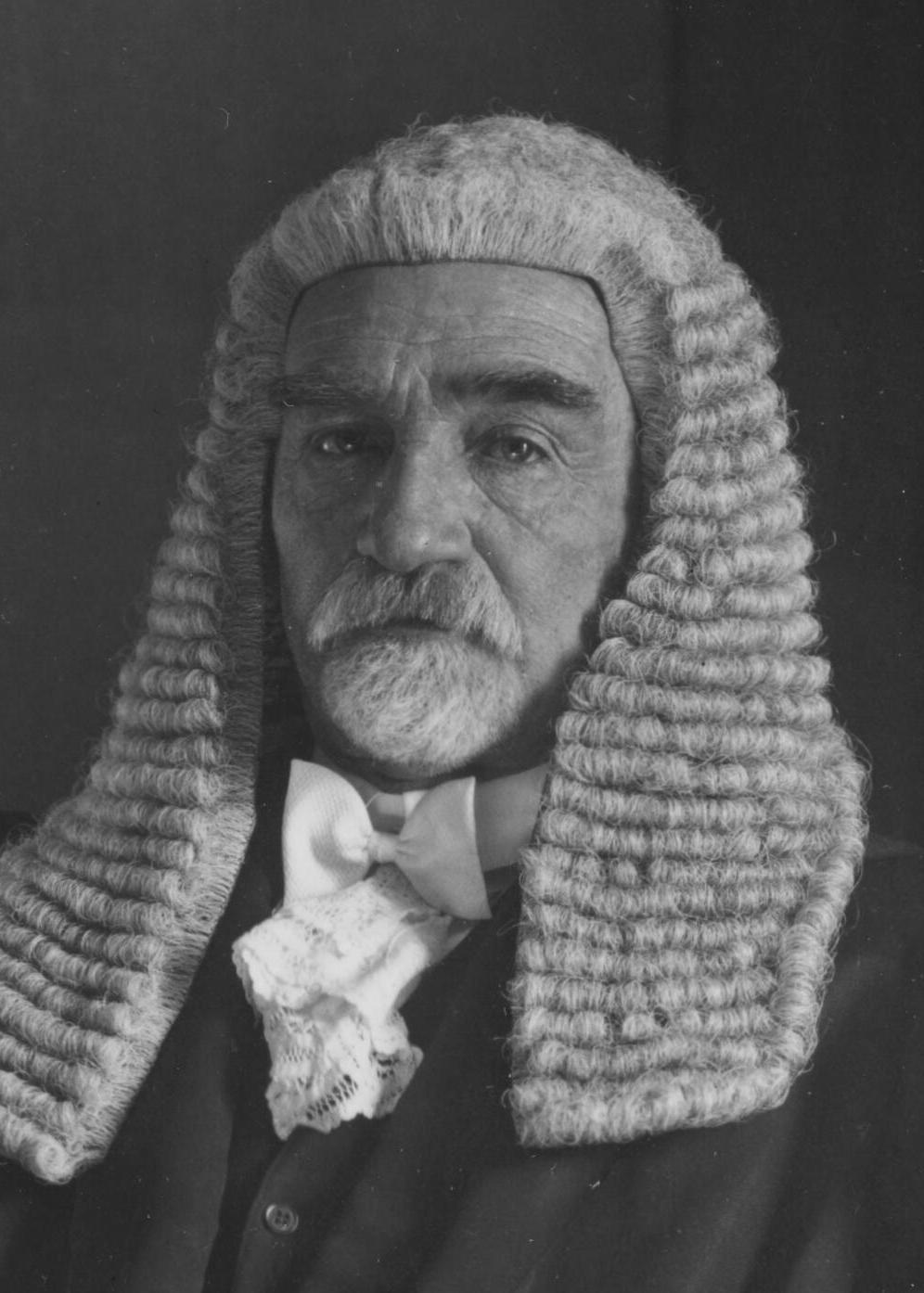

President of the Senate
- In office 31 August 1932 – 30 June 1938
- Preceded by: Walter Kingsmill
- Succeeded by: John Hayes

Minister for Works and Railways
- In office 14 November 1916 – 17 February 1917
- Prime Minister: Billy Hughes
- Preceded by: New office
- Succeeded by: William Watt

Senator for Western Australia
- In office 1 July 1907 – 30 June 1938

Personal details
- Born: 24 May 1867 Skearke, County Meath, Ireland
- Died: 15 January 1944 (aged 76) Mount Lawley, Western Australia, Australia
- Party: Labor (to 1917); Nationalist (1917–31); UAP (from 1931)
- Spouses: Annie Cleary (m. 1901–1931) Mary Brown (m. 1933)
- Occupation: Engineer

Patrick Joseph Lynch (24 May 1867 – 15 January 1944) was an Australian politician who served as a Senator for Western Australia from 1907 to 1938. He was President of the Senate from 1932 to 1938. He began his career in the Australian Labor Party (ALP), but after the party split of 1916 joined the Nationalist Party and later the United Australia Party (UAP).

== Early life ==
Lynch was born on 24 May 1867 in Skearke, a townland of County Meath, Ireland. He was the son of Bridget (née Cahill) and Michael Lynch; his father was a farmer.

Lynch was educated in County Cavan at Cormeen National School and Bailieborough Model School. After leaving school he worked on the family farm. He migrated to Queensland in 1886 and cut railway sleepers near Charleville and then travelled to the Croydon goldfields. In 1888 he started to work on ships operating along the Australian coast and in the South Pacific, eventually qualifying as a marine engineer. He worked as an engineer on a sugar plantation in Fiji and then on the Kalgoorlie goldfields in Western Australia. He helped found the Goldfields Engine-drivers' Association and was its general secretary from 1897 to 1904, also serving on the Boulder Municipal Council from 1901 to 1904.

== State politics ==
Lynch was elected to the Western Australian Legislative Assembly at the 1904 state election, winning the newly created seat of Mount Leonora unopposed for the Labor Party. He briefly served as minister for works from June to August 1905 when the ALP formed its first state government under the leadership of Henry Daglish.

Lynch was re-elected at the 1905 state election, but resigned his seat on 2 November 1906 in order to enter federal politics.

== Federal politics ==
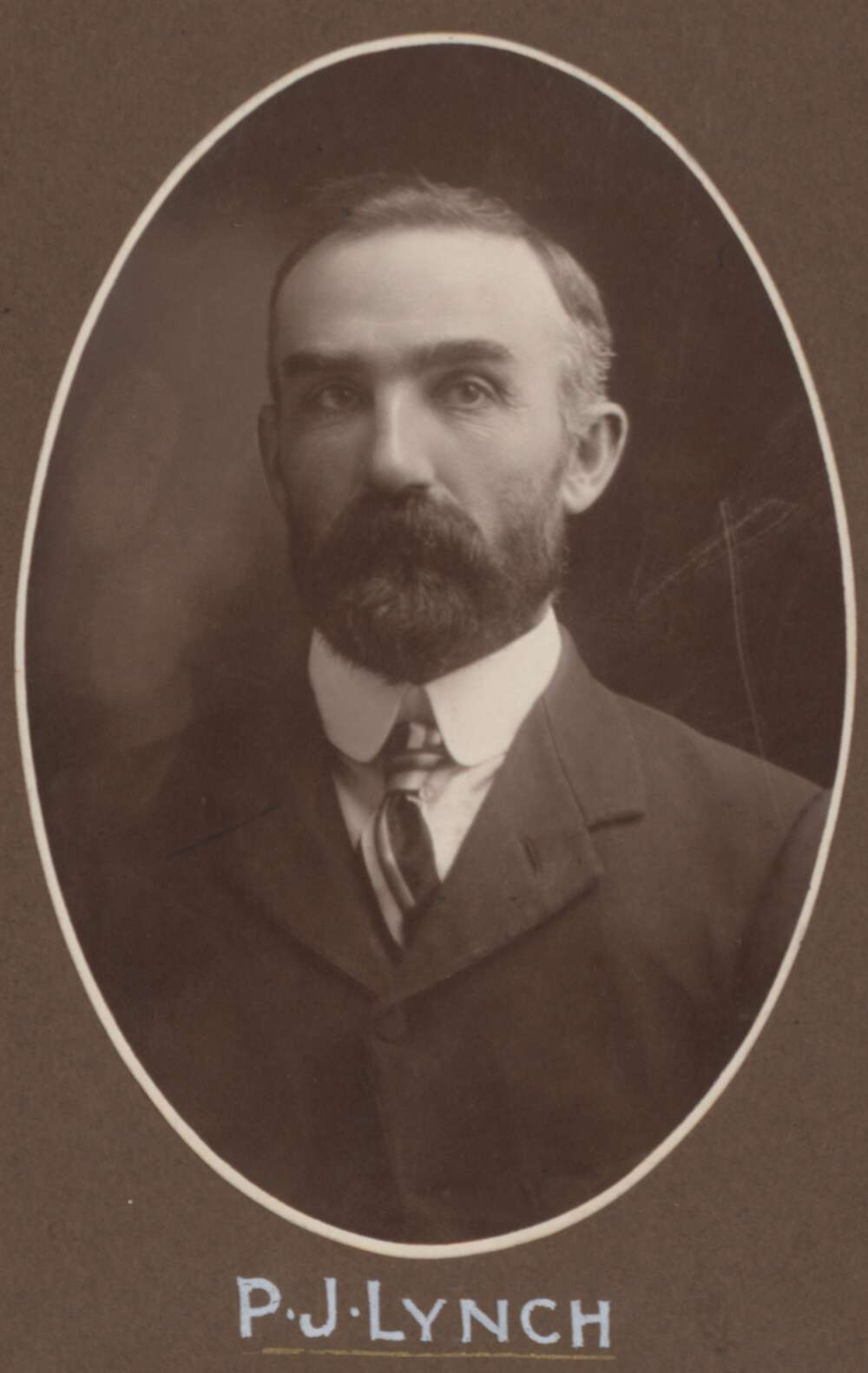
Lynch in 1908

Lynch was elected to the Australian Senate in the 1906 elections In 1916, he became the first chairman of the River Murray Commission. During World War I, he was the first Federal Labor parliamentarian to advocate conscription and along with Billy Hughes, stopped attending the parliamentary caucus of the party on 14 November 1916. Hughes appointed him Minister for Works and Railways in his National Labor Party ministry that day, but he lost this position in the 17 February 1917 ministry to make room for a former Commonwealth Liberal Party member. He was expelled from the state branch of the Australian Labor Party in March 1917. He was President of the Senate from August 1932 to June 1938, but was beaten at the 1937 elections.

== Final years ==
Lynch married Mary Brown in 1933 after being widowed two years earlier. He ran unsuccessfully for the state seat of Geraldton in 1939. He died at Mount Lawley in 1944, survived by his wife and two daughters and a son of his first marriage.

Political offices
Preceded by Sir Walter Kingsmill	President of the Australian Senate; 1932–1938	Succeeded by John Hayes
New office	Minister for Works and Railways; 1916–1917	Succeeded by William Watt
