= Fourth Hughes ministry =

14th ministry of government of Australia

- 14th Ministry of Australia

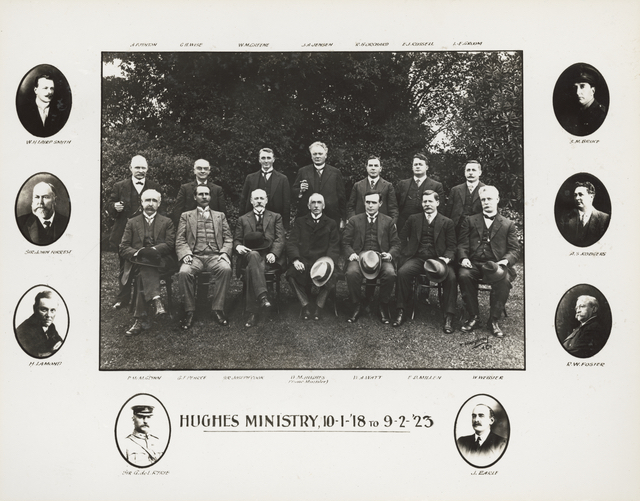
- Group photo of the Hughes ministry
- Date formed: 8 January 1918
- Date dissolved: 3 February 1920

People and organisations
- Monarch: George V
- Governor-General: Sir Ronald Munro Ferguson
- Prime Minister: Billy Hughes
- No. of ministers: 15
- Member party: Nationalist
- Status in legislature: Majority government
- Opposition party: Labor
- Opposition leader: Frank Tudor

History
- Outgoing election: 13 December 1919
- Legislature term: 7th
- Predecessor: Third Hughes ministry
- Successor: Fifth Hughes ministry

The Fourth Hughes ministry (Nationalist) was the 14th ministry of the Government of Australia. It was led by the country's 7th Prime Minister, Billy Hughes. The Fourth Hughes ministry succeeded the Third Hughes ministry, which dissolved on 8 January 1918 following the resignation of Hughes as prime minister after a vote of no-confidence within the Nationalist Party in the wake of a failed second referendum on conscription. However, due to a lack of alternative leaders, Hughes was immediately re-commissioned as prime minister by Governor-General Sir Ronald Munro Ferguson. The ministry was replaced by the Fifth Hughes ministry on 3 February 1920 following the 1919 federal election.

Walter Massy-Greene, who died in 1952, was the last surviving member of the Fourth Hughes ministry.

== Ministry ==
Party	Minister	Portrait	Portfolio
Nationalist	Billy Hughes (1862–1952) MP for Bendigo (1917–1922)		Prime Minister; Leader of the Nationalist Party; Attorney-General
Nationalist	Sir Joseph Cook (1860–1947) MP for Parramatta (1901–1921)		Deputy Leader of the Nationalist Party; Minister for the Navy
Nationalist	Sir John Forrest (1847–1918) MP for Swan (1901–1918)		Treasurer (to 27 March 1918)
Nationalist	Paddy Glynn (1855–1931) MP for Angas (1903–1919)		Minister for Home and Territories
Nationalist	George Pearce (1870–1952) Senator for Western Australia (1901–1938)		Minister for Defence
Nationalist	William Watt (1871–1946) MP for Balaclava (1914–1929)		Minister for Works and Railways (to 27 March 1918); Treasurer (from 27 March 1918); Minister for Trade and Customs (from 13 December 1918 to 17 January 1919); Acting Prime Minister in Mr. Hughes' absence (from April 1918 to August 1919)
Nationalist	Littleton Groom (1867–1936) MP for Darling Downs (1901–1929)		Vice-President of the Executive Council (to 27 March 1918); Minister for Works and Railways (from 27 March 1918)
Nationalist	Jens Jensen (1865–1936) MP for Bass (1910–1919)		Minister for Trade and Customs (to 13 December 1918)
Nationalist	Edward Millen (1860–1923) Senator for New South Wales (1901–1923)		Minister for Repatriation; Leader of the Government in the Senate
Nationalist	William Webster (1860–1936) MP for Gwydir (1903–1919)		Postmaster-General
Nationalist	Edward Russell (1878–1925) Senator for Victoria (1907–1925)		Honorary Minister (to 17 January 1919); Vice-President of the Executive Council (from 27 March 1918)
Nationalist	Walter Massy-Greene (1874–1952) MP for Richmond (1910–1922) (in Ministry from 27 March 1918)		Honorary Minister (from 27 March 1918 to 17 January 1919); Minister for Trade and Customs (from 17 January 1919)
Nationalist	Alexander Poynton (1853–1935) MP for Grey (1903–1922) (in Ministry from 27 March 1918)		Honorary Minister (from 27 March 1918)
Nationalist	George Wise (1853–1950) MP for Gippsland (1914–1922) (in Ministry from 27 March 1918)		Honorary Minister (from 27 March 1918)
Nationalist	Richard Orchard (1871–1942) MP for Nepean (1913–1919) (in Ministry from 27 March 1918)		Honorary Minister (from 27 March 1918 to 31 January 1919)
