= James Rowell =

English-born Australian politician, soldier and horticulturalist

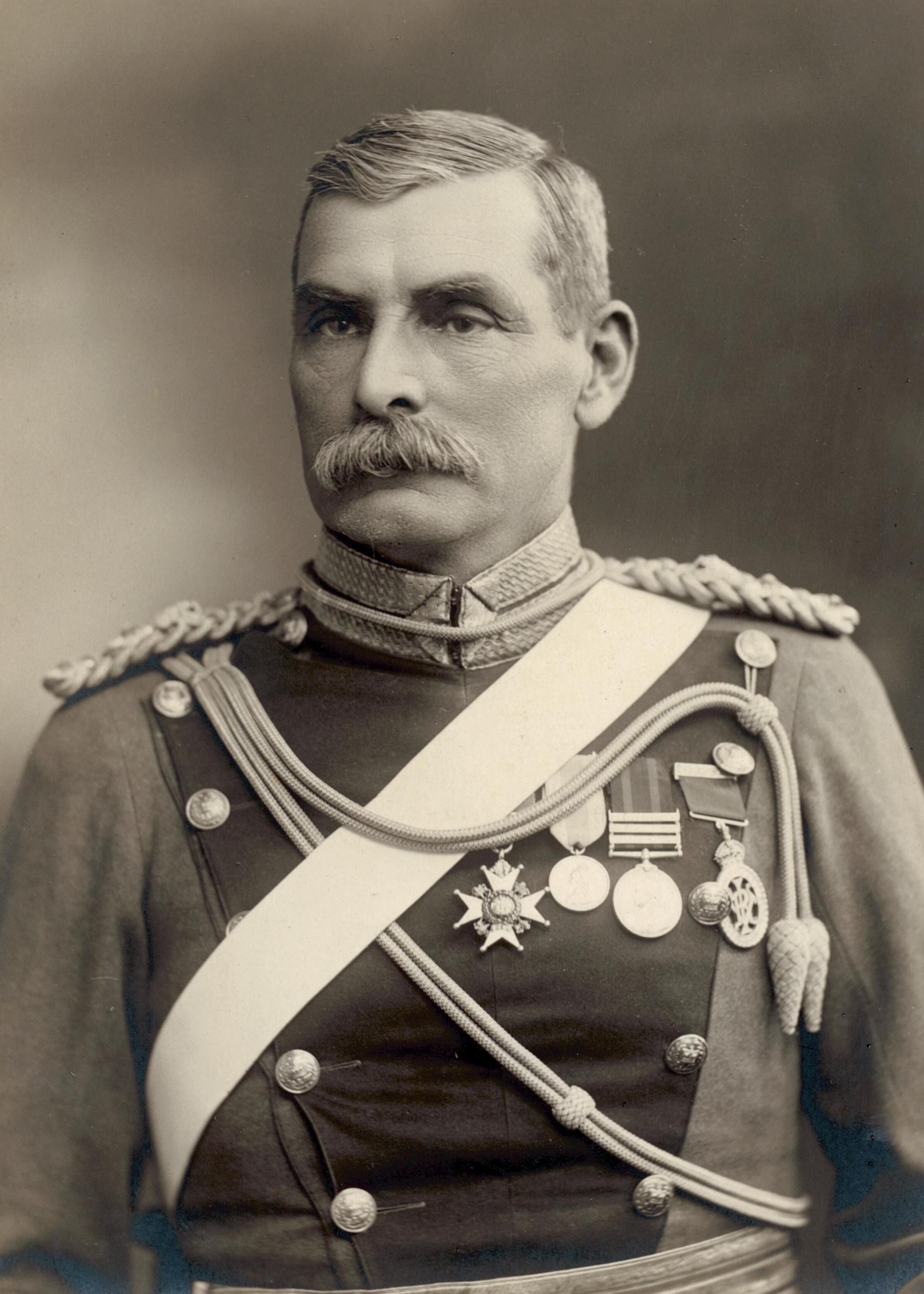

Senator for South Australia
- In office 24 May 1917 – 30 June 1923
- Preceded by: William Story

Personal details
- Born: 20 January 1851 Cambridge, England
- Died: 6 July 1940 (aged 89) Lockleys, South Australia, Australia
- Party: Nationalist (1917–22); Liberal (1922–23)
- Spouse(s): Elizabeth Marchant (m. 1874; died 1881) Zella Williams (m. 1883; died 1938)
- Relations: Sydney Rowell (son)
- Occupation: Horticulturalist

Military service
- Allegiance: Australia
- Branch/service: South Australian Military Force; Citizens Military Force
- Years of service: 1877–1910; 1915–1917
- Rank: Colonel
- Commands: South Australian Brigade; 4th Imperial Bushmen
- Battles/wars: Second Boer War; First World War
- Awards: Companion of the Order of the Bath; Mentioned in Despatches; Volunteer Officers' Decoration

Colonel James Rowell CB, VD (20 January 1851 – 6 July 1940) was an Australian soldier and politician. He was a Senator for South Australia from 1917 to 1923, representing the Nationalist Party. He was a long-serving officer in volunteer units, commanding a South Australian colonial unit during the second Boer War and later holding command in the Citizen Military Forces.

== Early life ==
Rowell was born on 20 January 1851 in Cambridge, England. He was the son of Susan (née Hall) and John Rowell. His father was a gardener at the time of his birth and later became a smallholder.

Rowell and his family immigrated to South Australia in 1855. His father took up a property of 100 acres (40 ha) at Lockleys and established an orchard and vineyard on The Reedbeds. He attended the public school in Fulham, leaving school at a young age to assist his father and later inheriting a one-third share in the property.

Rowell was a councillor of the Royal Agricultural and Horticultural Society of South Australia for nearly 50 years, including a term as president, and also served on the South Australian Board of Agriculture. He was said to be "highly skilled in the horticultural field and did much to advance the interests of the primary producer in South Australia".

== Military service ==
In 1877, Rowell enlisted in South Australia's Volunteer Military Forces as a member of the Reedbeds cavalry. He was subsequently commissioned as an officer in the South Australian Mounted Rifles, with the ranks of lieutenant (1880), captain (1881), major (1885), and lieutenant-colonel (1895). He represented South Australia at the Diamond Jubilee of Queen Victoria in 1897.

Rowell commanded the 4th South Australian Imperial Bushmen's Contingent during the second Boer War, which left Australia in May 1900 and returned in August 1901. He was promoted colonel and mentioned in dispatches during the war, subsequently receiving appointment as a Commander of the Order of the Bath (CB) and the Queen's South Africa Medal with four clasps.

After the federation of the Australian colonies, Rowell remained a high-ranking officer in the Citizen Forces, commanding the 10th Australian Infantry Regiment from 1904. During World War I he was recalled to active duty and from 1915 to 1917 made several journeys to Egypt and England on troop ships carrying Australian Imperial Force units.

== Politics ==
Rowell was a member of the West Torrens District Council for sixteen years, including twelve as chairman, and served as president of the District Councils' Association and vice-president of the Local Government Association. He first stood for parliament at the 1910 South Australian state election, running unsuccessfully for the Liberal Union in the seat of Electoral district of Adelaide.

At the 1917 federal election, Rowell was elected to a six-year Senate term on the Nationalist Party ticket in South Australia. His term was due to commence on 1 July 1917, but he began his term early on 24 May 1917 after being appointed to fill the casual vacancy caused by the resignation of William Story. His term ended on 30 June 1923 following his defeat at the 1922 election.

In the Senate, Rowell spoke frequently on primary industry and matters relating to returned servicemen. He was a strong supporter of the Australian Soldiers' Repatriation Act 1917, which gave generous assistance to returned soldiers, and unsuccessfully sought to extend the war service homes scheme to veterans of the Boer War. In 1918, Rowell was appointed to the Select Committee on the Effect of Intoxicating Liquor on Australian Soldiers. He supported the majority position which opposed legislation to impose prohibition on the military.

== Personal life ==
In 1874, Rowell married Elizabeth Marchant, with whom he had two children. He was widowed in 1881 and remarried in 1883 to Zella Williams, with whom he had another five children. His son Sydney became an army general and served as chief of the general staff, while two other sons also saw active service.

Rowell died at his home in Lockleys on 6 July 1940, aged 89.
