= Third Hughes ministry =

13th ministry of government of Australia

- 13th Ministry of Australia

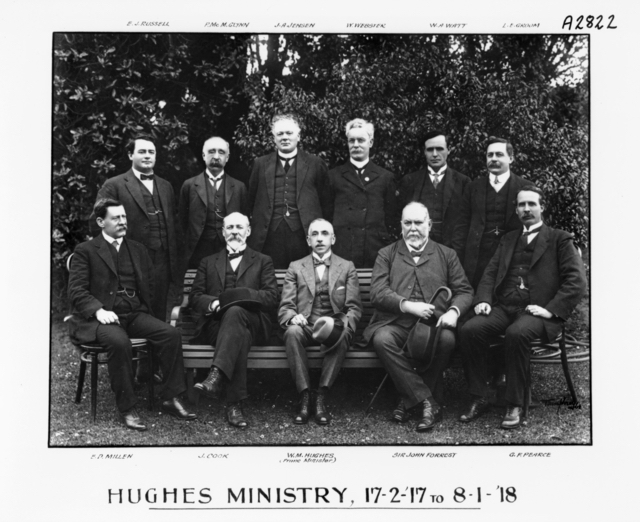
- Group photo of the Third Hughes ministry
- Date formed: 17 February 1917
- Date dissolved: 8 January 1918

People and organisations
- Monarch: George V
- Governor-General: Sir Ronald Munro Ferguson
- Prime Minister: Billy Hughes
- No. of ministers: 11
- Member party: Nationalist
- Status in legislature: Majority government
- Opposition party: Labor
- Opposition leader: Frank Tudor

History
- Election: 5 May 1917
- Legislature terms: 6th 7th
- Predecessor: Second Hughes ministry
- Successor: Fourth Hughes ministry

The Third Hughes ministry (Nationalist) was the 13th ministry of the Government of Australia. It was led by the country's 7th Prime Minister, Billy Hughes. The Third Hughes ministry succeeded the Second Hughes ministry, which dissolved on 17 February 1917 after the governing National Labor Party merged with the Liberal Party to form the Nationalist Party. The National Labor Party itself formed as a consequence of the split that took place within the then-governing Labor Party over the issue of conscription. The ministry was replaced by the Fourth Hughes ministry on 8 January 1918 following the resignation of Hughes as prime minister after a vote of no-confidence within the Nationalist Party in the wake of a failed second referendum on conscription. However, due to a lack of alternative leaders, Hughes was immediately re-commissioned as prime minister by Governor-General Sir Ronald Munro Ferguson.

This new ministry was a predominantly conservative one, with six of the eleven ministries held by Liberals.

Billy Hughes, who died in 1952, was the last surviving member of the Third Hughes ministry; Hughes was also the last surviving member of the Watson ministry, First Fisher ministry, Third Fisher ministry and Second Hughes ministry.

== Ministry ==
Party	Minister	Portrait	Portfolio
Nationalist	Billy Hughes (1862–1952) MP for West Sydney (1901–1917) MP for Bendigo (1917–1922)		Prime Minister; Leader of the Nationalist Party; Attorney-General
Nationalist	Joseph Cook (1860–1947) MP for Parramatta (1901–1921)		Deputy Leader of the Nationalist Party; Minister for the Navy
Nationalist	Sir John Forrest (1847–1918) MP for Swan (1901–1918)		Treasurer
Nationalist	George Pearce (1870–1952) Senator for Western Australia (1901–1938)		Minister for Defence
Nationalist	Edward Millen (1860–1923) Senator for New South Wales (1901–1923)		Vice-President of the Executive Council (to 16 November 1917); Minister for Repatriation (from 28 September 1917); Leader of the Government in the Senate
Nationalist	William Watt (1871–1946) MP for Balaclava (1914–1929)		Minister for Works and Railways
Nationalist	Paddy Glynn (1855–1931) MP for Angas (1903–1919)		Minister for Home and Territories
Nationalist	Jens Jensen (1865–1936) MP for Bass (1910–1919)		Minister for Trade and Customs
Nationalist	William Webster (1860–1936) MP for Gwydir (1903–1919)		Postmaster-General
Nationalist	Littleton Groom (1867–1936) MP for Darling Downs (1901–1929)		Honorary Minister (to 16 November 1917); Vice-President of the Executive Council (from 16 November 1917)
Nationalist	Edward Russell (1878–1925) Senator for Victoria (1907–1925)		Honorary Minister
