= Fred Bamford =

Australian politician (1849–1934)

The Honourable Fred Bamford
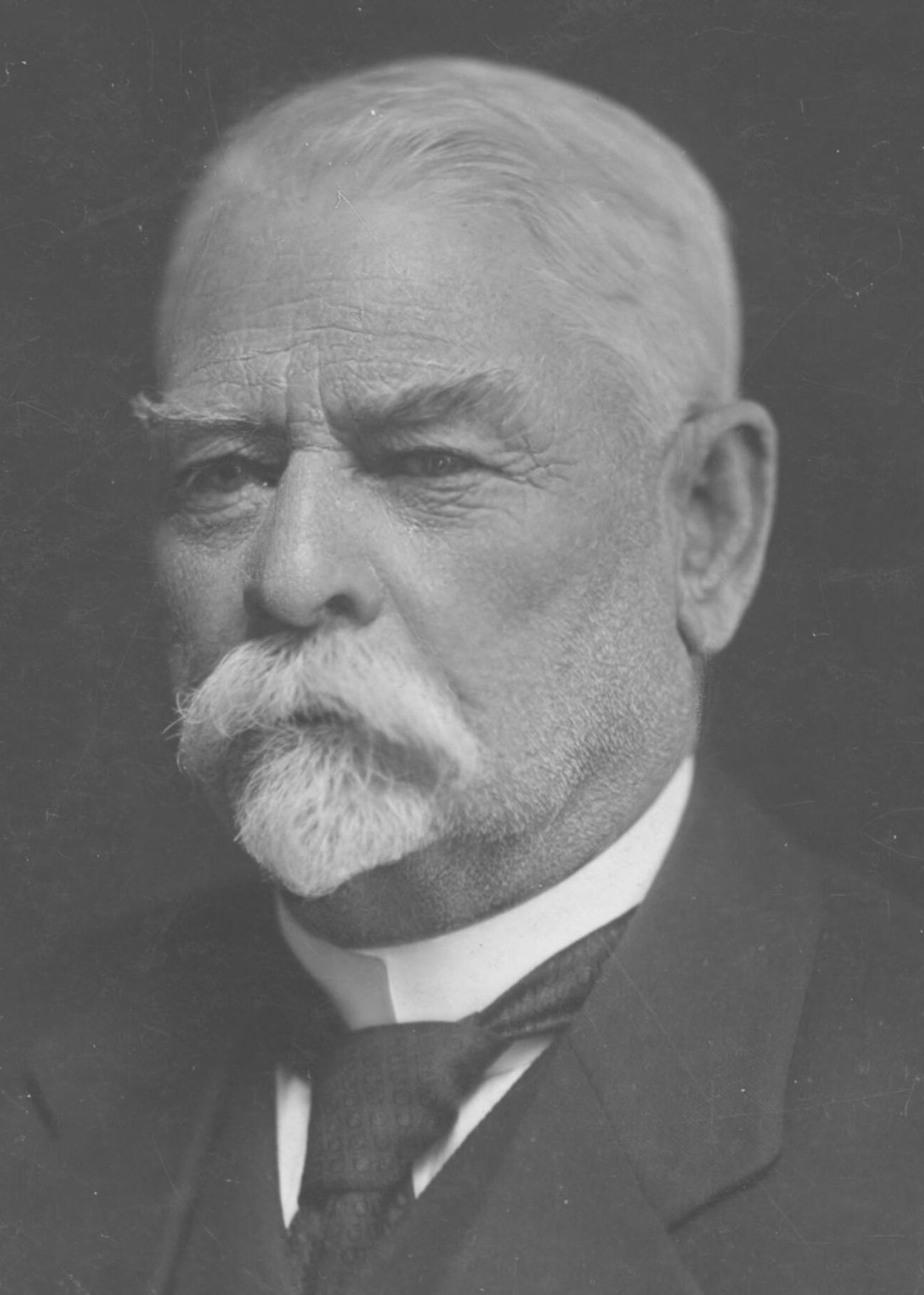

Minister for Home and Territories
- In office 14 November 1916 – 17 February 1917
- Prime Minister: Billy Hughes
- Preceded by: King O'Malley
- Succeeded by: Paddy Glynn

Member of the Australian Parliament for Herbert
- In office 30 March 1901 – 3 October 1925
- Preceded by: New seat
- Succeeded by: Lewis Nott

Personal details
- Born: 11 February 1849 Dubbo, Colony of New South Wales
- Died: 10 September 1934 (aged 85) Sydney, New South Wales, Australia
- Party: Labor (to 1916); National Labor (1916–1917) Nationalist (from 1917)
- Spouse: Mary Ann Miller (m. 1871)
- Occupation: Cabinetmaker

Frederick William Bamford (11 February 1849 – 10 September 1934) was an Australian politician. He was a member of the Australian House of Representatives from the inaugural 1901 federal election until his retirement in 1925, representing the electorate of Herbert. He represented the Australian Labor Party until the 1916 Labor split, when he followed Billy Hughes into the National Labor Party and served as Minister for Home and Territories in the second Hughes Ministry (1916–1917). He remained in parliament until the age of 76.

== Early life ==
Bamford was born in Dubbo, New South Wales and educated at Toowoomba, Queensland. He left school at 14 and worked as a carpenter around the Toowoomba area for many years. In September 1871 he married Mary Ann Miller. In July 1872, he began a building and carpentry partnership in Mackay with a colleague from Toowoomba; however, the partnership was dissolved that December after a falling-out, and he thereafter operated a furniture shop in Mackay before being declared bankrupt in April 1884. He worked as a sleeper-inspector on the under-construction Bowen railway and then as inspector of railway bridges in the Cairns area and was discharged from bankruptcy in November 1885.

Bamford moved to Bowen c. 1892 and operated the Sportsmans Arms Hotel there from early 1894, later shifting to the Railway Hotel, which he operated until the time of his election. He also became the local secretary of the licensed victuallers' association. He was elected as a councillor of the Borough of Bowen in 1897 and was elected mayor in 1898. He resigned from the council in July 1899 and thereafter worked as a journalist for a Townsville newspaper. He made two unsuccessful candidacies for the Parliament of Queensland in 1896 and 1899.

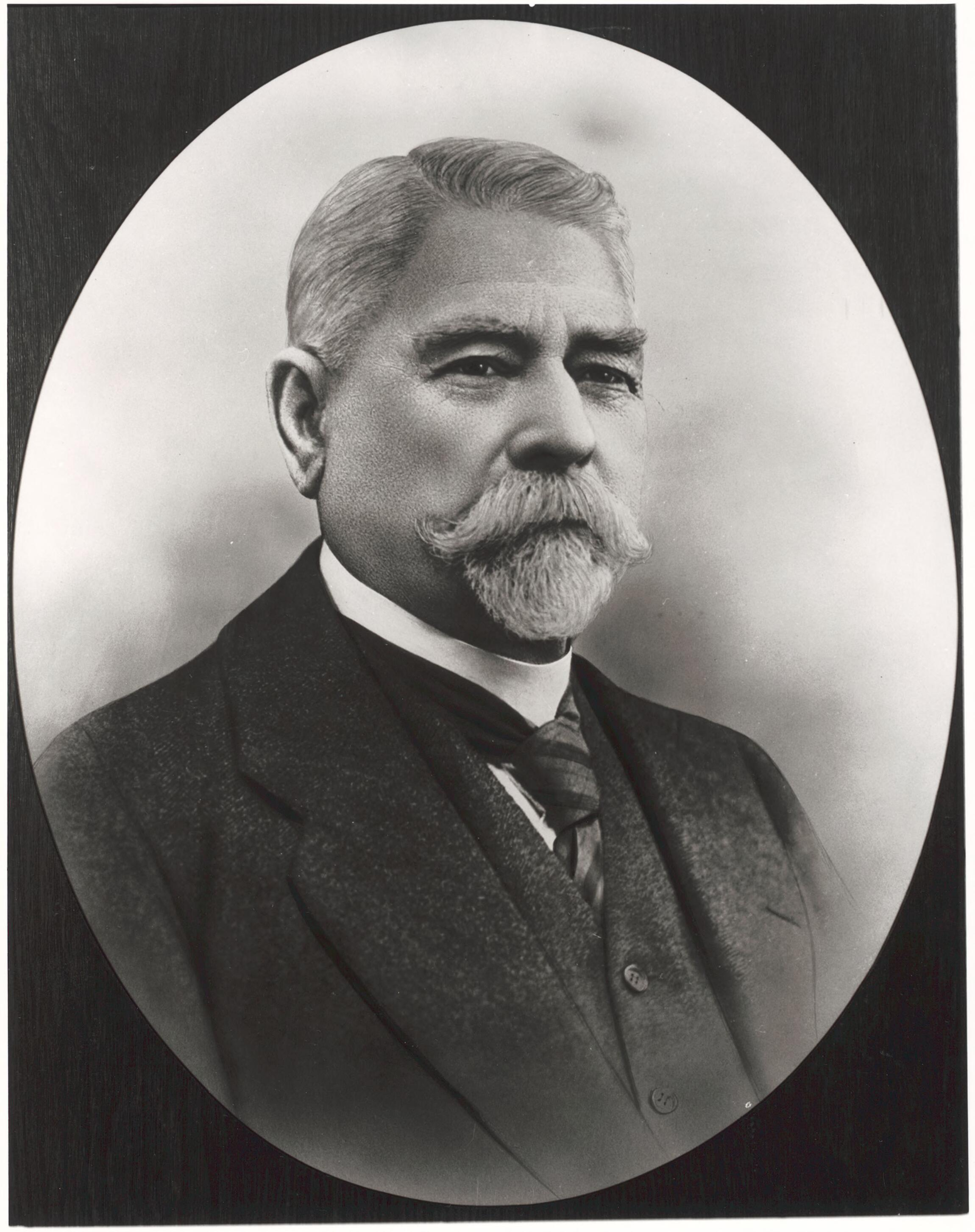
Undated photo

== Federal Parliament ==
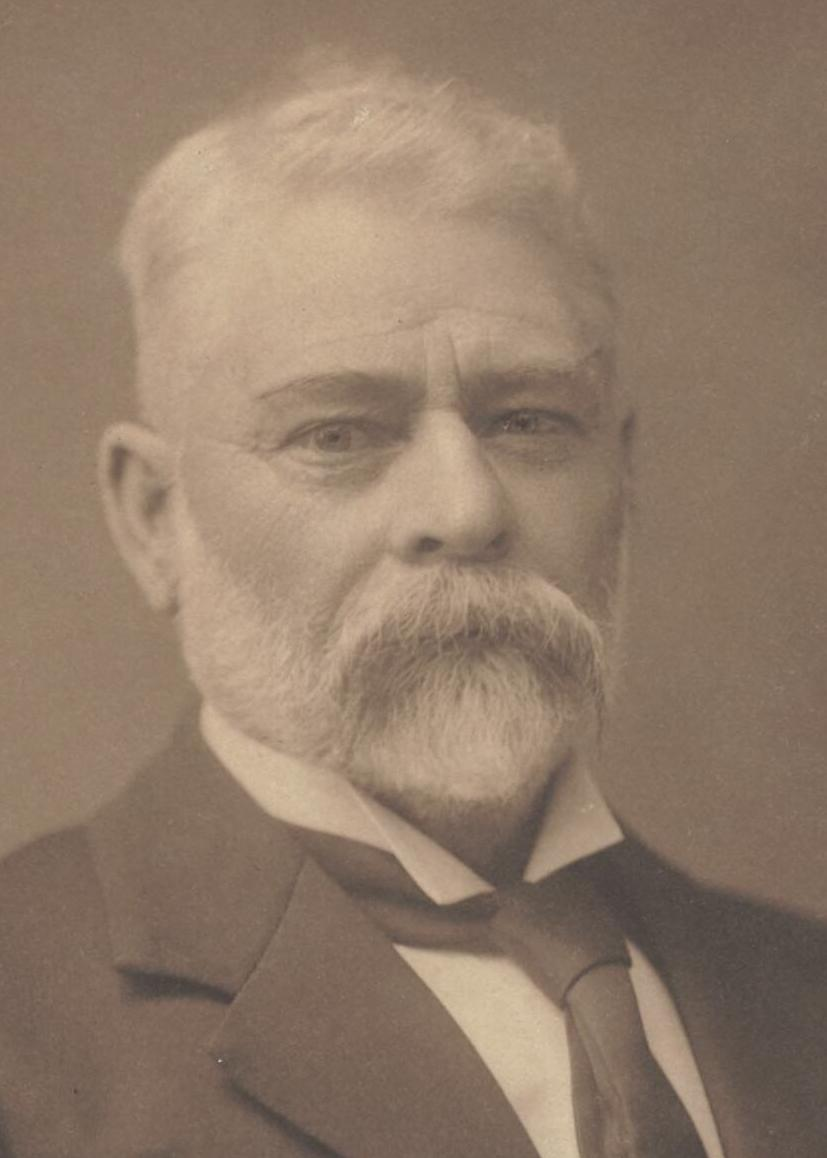
Portrait of Bamford by Swiss Studios

Bamford narrowly won the House of Representatives seat of Herbert at the 1901 election as the Australian Labor Party candidate, campaigning specifically against the employment of Kanakas in the North Queensland sugar cane fields. In parliament, he spoke frequently in support of the White Australia policy and subsidies and protection for the sugar industry. From 1902 to 1916, he was vice-president of the Waterside Workers' Federation while Billy Hughes was its president. He was chairman of the 1913 Royal Commission on the Pearling Industry and the 1915 Royal Commission on New Hebrides mail service.

In July 1915, Bamford became the first member to speak in favour of the introduction of conscription during World War I. He was expelled from the Labor Party on 30 October 1916 and was Minister for Home and Territories in Hughes' National Labor Party ministry from 14 November to 17 February 1917. He served as chairman of committees from 1923 to 1925. He retired from parliament at the 1925 election.

== Later life ==
Bamford moved to Sydney, where he died in 1934, survived by three sons and two daughters. He was cremated at Rookwood Crematorium.

== Notes ==
Political offices
Preceded by King O'Malley	Minister for Home and Territories; 1916–17	Succeeded by Paddy Glynn
Parliament of Australia
New division	Member for Herbert; 1901–25	Succeeded by Lewis Nott
