= Edward Russell (Australian politician) =

Australian politician (1878–1925)

The Honourable Edward Russell
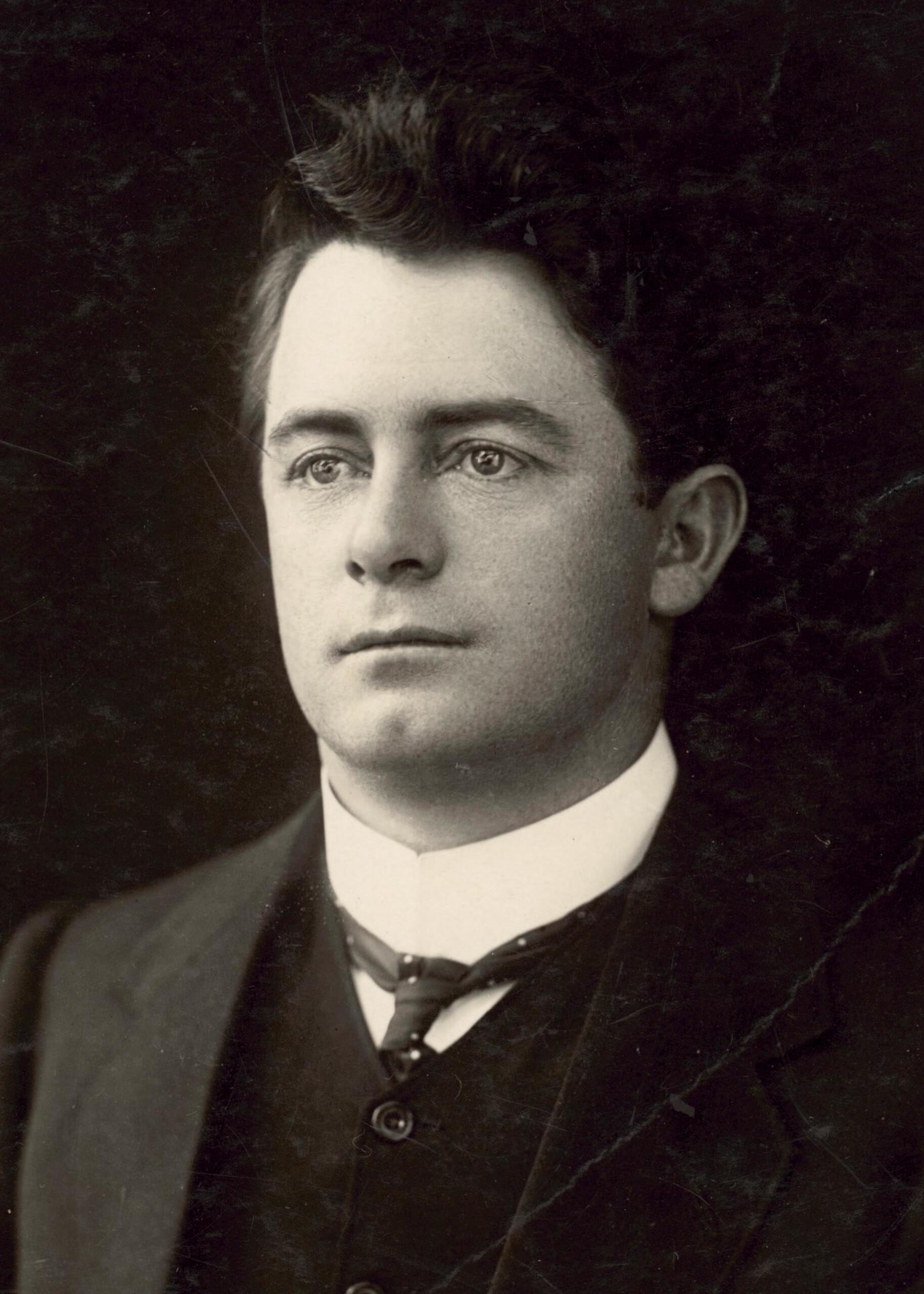

Vice-President of the Executive Council
- In office 27 March 1918 – 21 December 1921
- Prime Minister: Billy Hughes
- Preceded by: Littleton Groom
- Succeeded by: John Earle

Senator for Victoria
- In office 1 July 1907 – 18 July 1925
- Succeeded by: William Plain

Personal details
- Born: 10 August 1878 Warrnambool, Victoria, Australia
- Died: 18 July 1925 (aged 46) Sunbury, Victoria, Australia
- Party: Labor (to 1916); National Labor (1916-1917); Nationalist (from 1917)
- Other political affiliations: Socialist (1906-1907)
- Occupation: Unionist

Edward John Russell (10 August 1878 – 18 July 1925) was an Australian politician. He served as a senator for Victoria from 1907 until his death in 1925. He began his career in the Australian Labor Party (ALP), but was expelled during the 1916 split and became a Nationalist. He served as Vice-President of the Executive Council from 1918 to 1921 and was an assistant minister in the governments of Andrew Fisher and Billy Hughes. Following a nervous breakdown, his final years in the Senate were spent in mental institutions.

== Early life ==
Russell was born on 10 August 1878 in Warrnambool, Victoria, the son of Mary Frances (née Conway) and Joseph Russell. His father was an Irish immigrant who worked as a baker. The family moved to Melbourne in 1890, during a largescale maritime strike. Russell attended the state school in Newport and St Mary's Catholic School in Williamstown. After leaving school he worked variously as a dray driver, tinsmith, and office clerk.

Russell was involved with the labour movement from 1899, becoming a delegate from the Printers' Union to the Melbourne Trades Hall. He developed his public-speaking skills through his participation in literary and debating societies.

== Politics ==
Russell was an unsuccessful candidate for the Victorian Legislative Assembly at the 1904 state election, running for the Australian Labor Party (ALP) in the seat of Prahran. In 1906, he became a founding member of the Victorian Socialist Party (VSP), which operated alongside the ALP.

=== Senate ===
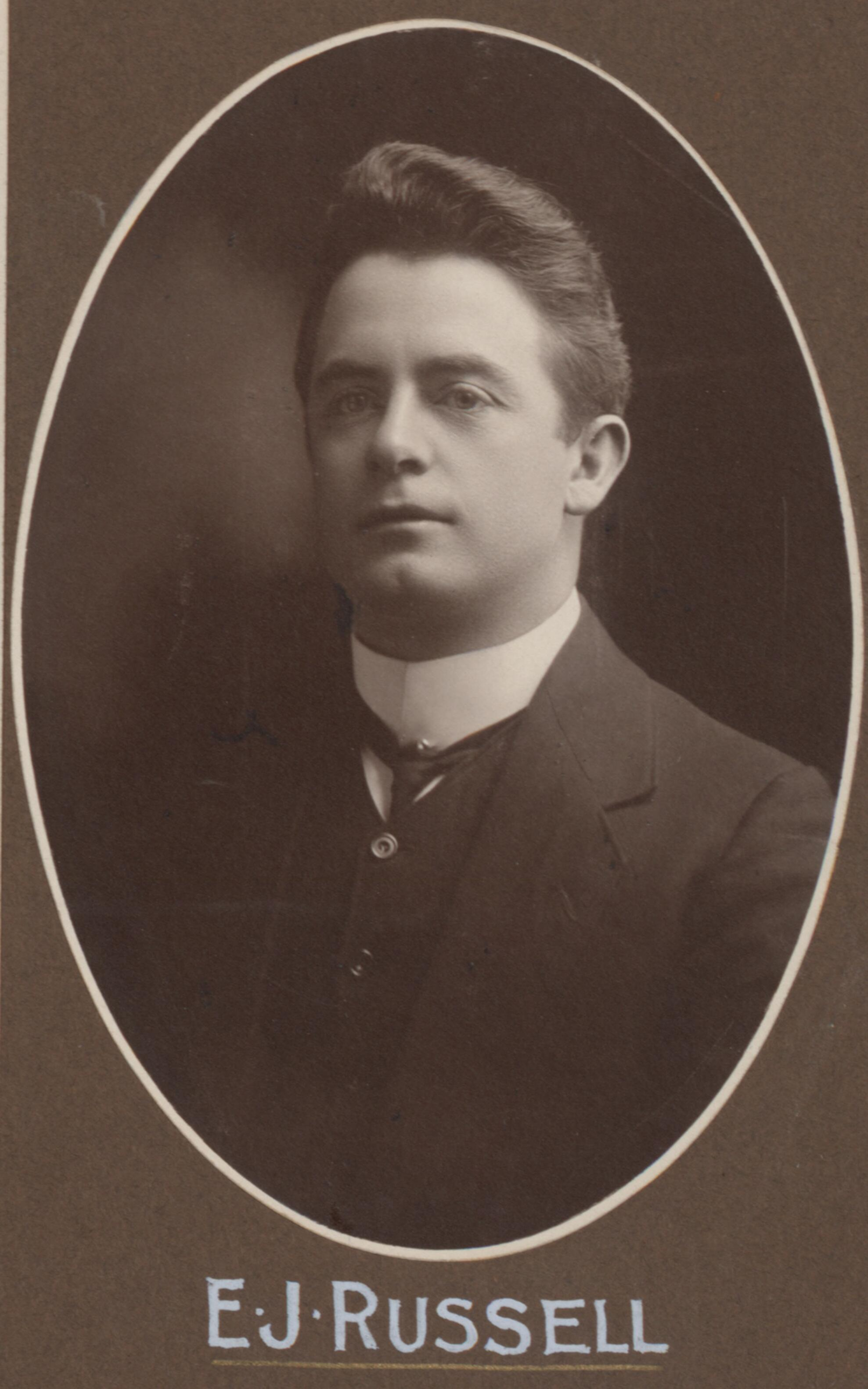
Russell in 1908

Russell was elected to the Senate at the 1906 federal election, to a six-year term beginning on 1 July 1907. He was the only ALP candidate elected in Victoria, polling the third-highest number of votes in the state. From September 1913 he was an assistant minister in the Fisher and Hughes governments. On 27 October 1916, he resigned from the ministry along with William Higgs and William Webster in opposition to Hughes handling of conscription. Nevertheless, on 14 November 1916, he joined Hughes' National Labor Party government and was reappointed to the ministry as assistant minister. From March 1918 to December 1921, he was Vice-President of the Executive Council. He was also chairman of various boards dealing with agricultural commodities and vice-president of the Board of Trade and for much of 1919 he was acting Minister for Defence.

== Personal life ==
Russell married Maggie May Evans on 30 April 1907 in Brunswick, Victoria; she had also been involved in socialist politics. The couple had two sons and three daughters.

Outside of politics, Russell served as chairman of the Gordon Memorial Committee, which organised an annual pilgrimage to the grave of poet Adam Lindsay Gordon and sought to raise funds for an equestrian statue in his honour.

=== Ill health and death ===
Russell was unable to campaign at the 1922 federal election, having suffered a bout of pneumonia and a nervous breakdown. He was subsequently unable to return to public life. He was given two months' leave from the Senate in July 1923 due to ill health, and two further periods of six months' leave in March 1924 and June 1925.

In January 1925, Smith's Weekly reported that Russell had been a resident at the Sunbury Asylum for nearly two months, after a previous stay at Royal Park Hospital for the Insane. The publication criticised parliament for allowing him to retain his seat in the Senate, describing it as "benevolence at the taxpayers' expense". Russell died at Sunbury on 18 July 1925, aged 46. According to The Herald his cause of death was "disease of the brain". He was granted a state funeral and interred at Brighton Cemetery.

Political offices
Preceded by Littleton Groom	Vice-President of the Executive Council; 1918 – 1921	Succeeded by John Earle
