= Frank Tudor =

Australian politician and leader of the Labor Party

The Honourable Frank Tudor
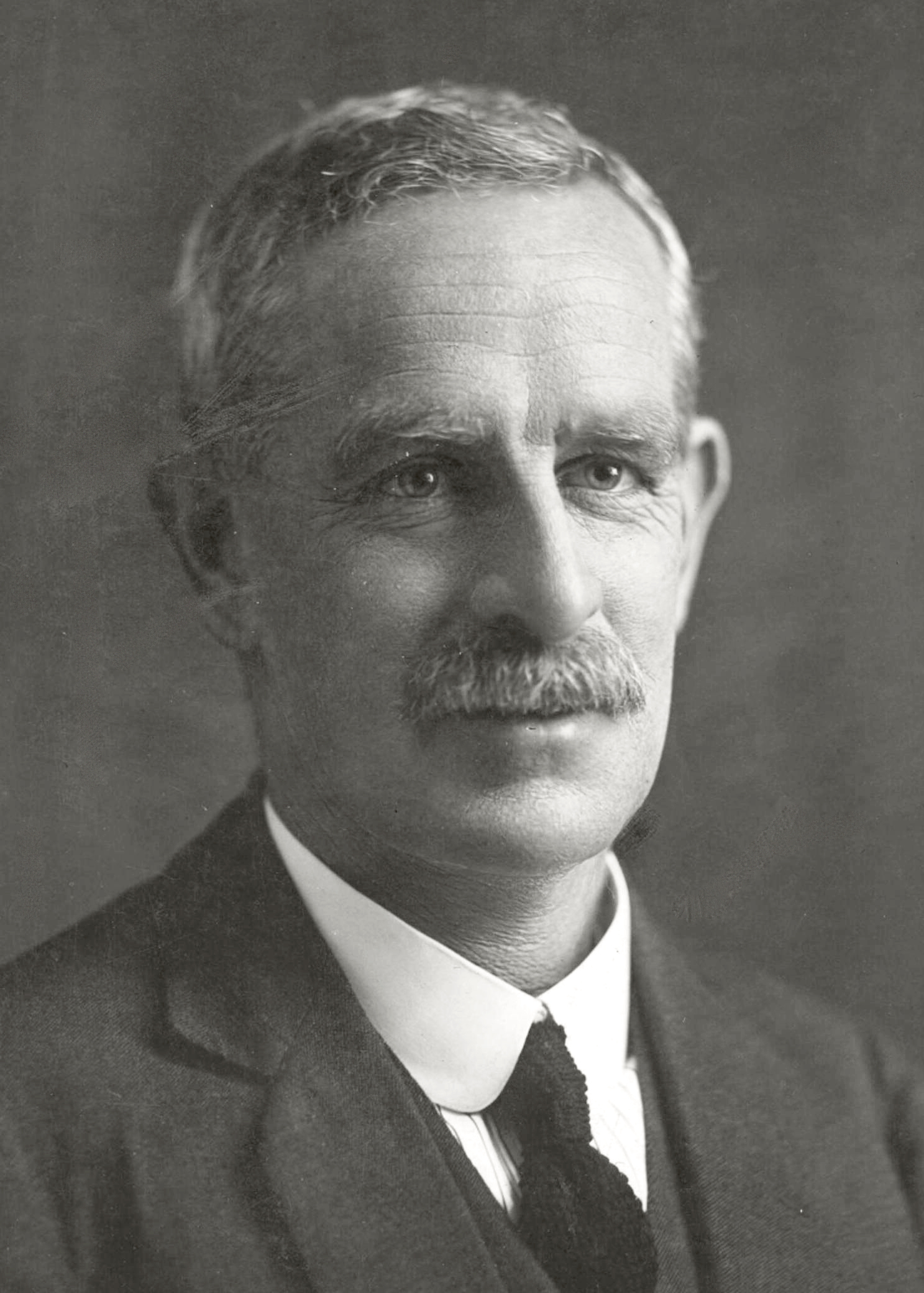

Leader of the Opposition
- In office 17 February 1917 – 10 January 1922
- Prime Minister: Billy Hughes
- Deputy: Albert Gardiner
- Preceded by: Joseph Cook
- Succeeded by: Matthew Charlton

Leader of the Labor Party
- In office 14 November 1916 – 10 January 1922
- Deputy: Albert Gardiner
- Preceded by: Billy Hughes
- Succeeded by: Matthew Charlton

Minister for Trade and Customs
- In office 17 September 1914 – 14 September 1916
- Prime Minister: Andrew Fisher; Billy Hughes
- Preceded by: Littleton Groom
- Succeeded by: Billy Hughes (acting)
- In office 29 April 1910 – 24 June 1913
- Prime Minister: Andrew Fisher
- Preceded by: Robert Best
- Succeeded by: Littleton Groom
- In office 13 November 1908 – 2 June 1909
- Prime Minister: Andrew Fisher
- Preceded by: Austin Chapman
- Succeeded by: Robert Best

Member of the Australian Parliament for Yarra
- In office 30 March 1901 – 10 January 1922
- Preceded by: Seat created
- Succeeded by: James Scullin

Personal details
- Born: 29 January 1866 Williamstown, Victoria Colony, British Empire
- Died: 10 January 1922 (aged 55) Richmond, Victoria, Australia
- Party: Labor
- Spouses: Alice Smale (m. 1894; wid. 1894) Fanny Mead (m. 1897)
- Children: 6
- Education: Richmond Central State School

Francis Gwynne Tudor (29 January 1866 – 10 January 1922) was an Australian politician who served as the leader of the Australian Labor Party from 1916 until his death. He had previously been a government minister under Andrew Fisher and Billy Hughes.

Tudor was born in Melbourne to Welsh immigrant parents. He left school at a young age to enter the workforce, serving an apprenticeship in the felt hat industry and later studying his trade for periods in England and the United States. He became involved in trade unionism in England, and after returning to Australia served as president of the Felt Hatters' Union. Tudor was elected president of the Victorian Trades Hall Council in 1900. The following year, he was elected to the new federal parliament as a representative of the Labor Party. He was chosen as the parliamentary party's first whip, and held that position until entering cabinet in 1908.

Tudor served as Minister for Trade and Customs from 1908 to 1909, 1910 to 1913, and 1914 to 1916, in the governments of Andrew Fisher and Billy Hughes. He remained loyal to the Labor Party during the split over conscription in 1916, and was elected party leader after Hughes' expulsion. He replaced Joseph Cook as leader of the opposition upon the formation of the Third Hughes ministry in February 1917. Tudor led Labor to the 1917 and 1919 federal elections, on both occasions suffering heavy defeats. His death in office at the age of 55 came after a long period of ill health. He was the first leader of a major Australian political party to die in office, and was accorded a state funeral.

== Early life ==
Tudor was born to John Llewellyn Tudor, a ballastman, and Ellen Charlotte Tudor, née Burt, both of Welsh origin, on 29 January 1866 at Williamstown, Victoria. However, the family soon moved to the Melbourne suburb of Richmond, where Tudor lived most of his life.

Upon leaving Richmond Central State School, and after short spells in a sawmill and a boot factory, Tudor entered the felt hat industry. Tudor apprenticed in Abbotsford and then travelled across Victoria in the hat trade. Tudor went to England, working in London, Birmingham, Liverpool and Manchester, marrying Alice Smale in Denton, Lancashire in 1894. Smale died the same year, but Tudor continued in the felt hat trade by moving to London and becoming vice-president of the local branch of the Felt Hatters' Union. In 1897 Tudor remarried to Fanny Jane Mead.

As vice-president of the union Tudor became interested in union politics (as many Labor politicians were before their entry into politics) and persuaded the British unions to adopt the union label principle. Returning to Australia, Tudor worked at Abbotsford's mills and took a seat in the Victorian Trades Hall Council. In 1900 he became president.

Tudor was president of the Victorian Life Saving Society, and held a Bronze Medallion as a qualified life saver. He had a long association with the Richmond Football Club, and served as club president from 1909 to 1918.

== Entry into politics ==
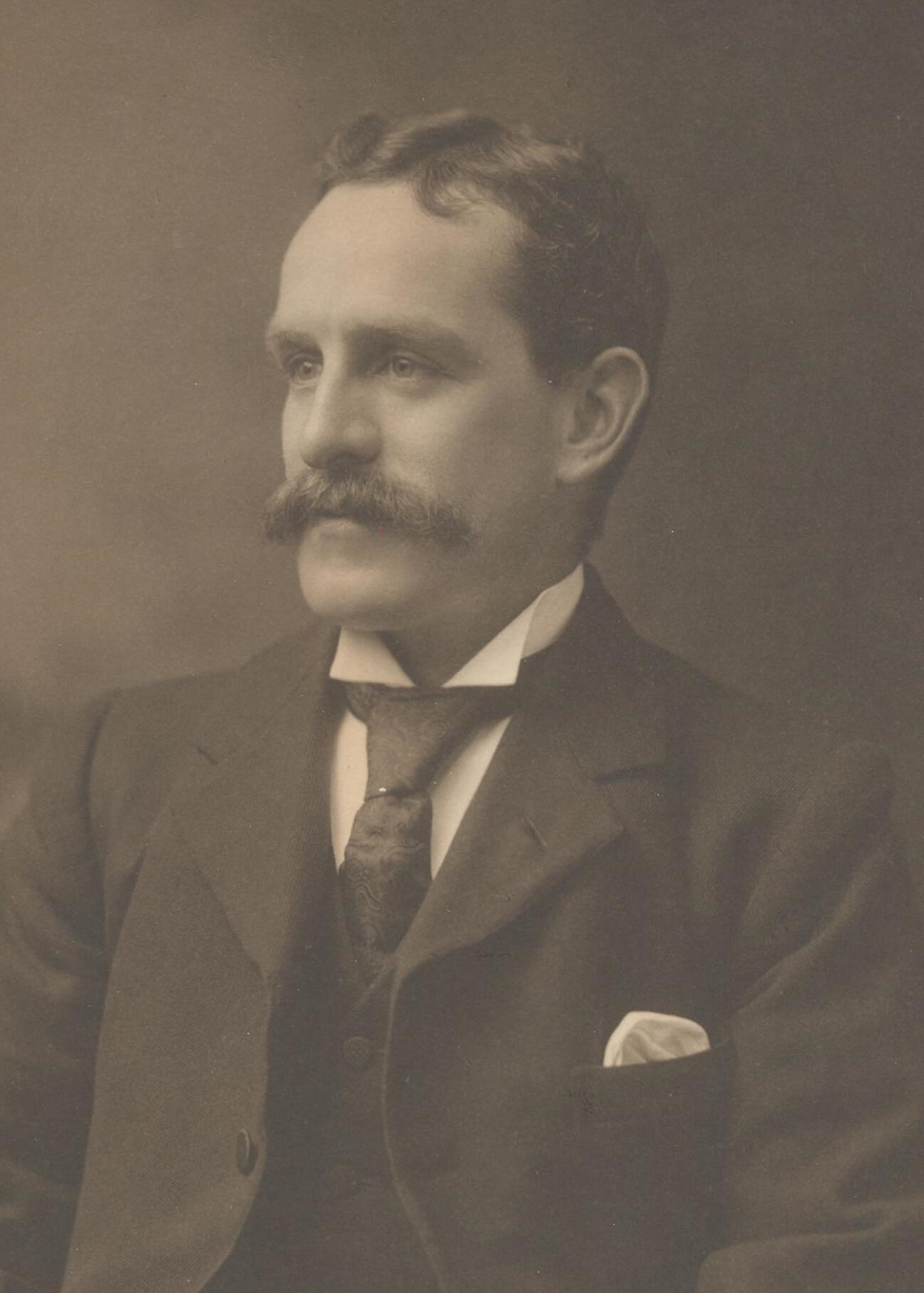
Tudor early in his political career

A prominent figure in Richmond, Victoria, Tudor turned the Division of Yarra into the safest Labor seat in the country by winning that seat by a large margin in the 1901 federal election. Tudor was a deacon of the Congregational Church and angered some Protestants with his calls for Home Rule for Ireland.

== Frontbencher ==
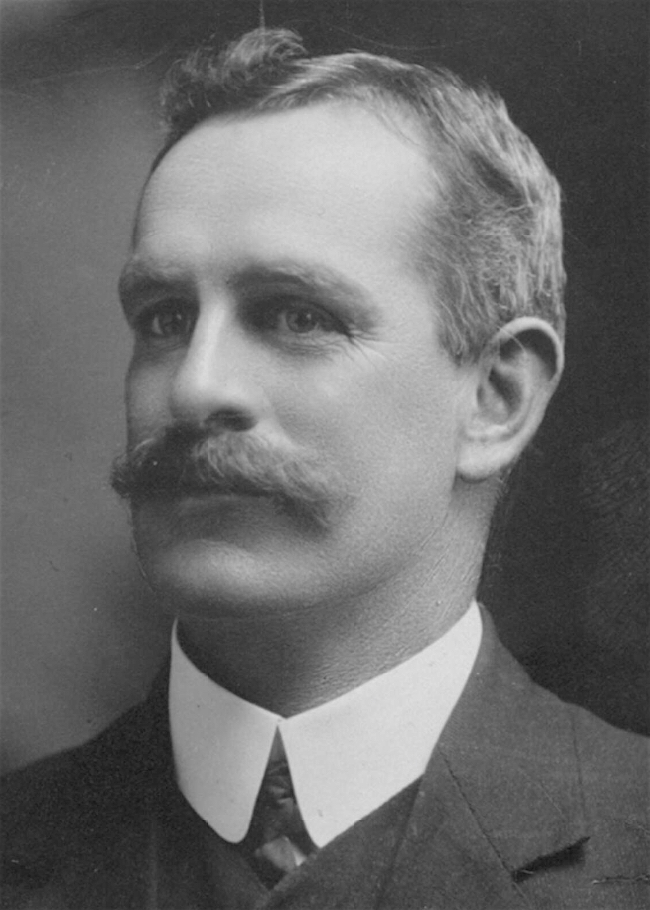
Tudor in 1908

Tudor was immediately elected the Labor Party's whip and assistant secretary, before ascending to the position of secretary in 1904. Under the leadership of Andrew Fisher, he was Minister for Trade and Customs during the three Fisher ministries, from 1908 to 1909, 1910–1913, and 1914–1915. According to the Australian Dictionary of Biography, he was an "efficient administrator, with an eye for detail" who "made friends and earned respect on both sides of the House, and was considered to be the most moderate of the Victorian Labor members".

Billy Hughes replaced Fisher as prime minister in 1915. Tudor maintained his position in the ministry, and initially remained neutral during the debate within the ALP over overseas conscription, which Hughes supported. After pressure from his local political labour council in Richmond, he eventually came out against conscription and resigned from the ministry in September 1916. Tudor became a leader of the "No" campaign during the 1916 conscription referendum, alongside T. J. Ryan and William Higgs. On 14 November, the ALP split irrevocably over the issue. Hughes led his supporters out of a caucus meeting and formed a new National Labor Party, allowing him to stay on as prime minister with the aid of the Liberals. On 15 November Tudor was elected unopposed as the new leader of the Labor Party in his place – the party's first Australian-born leader. According to historian Denis Murphy, he was likely elected to the leadership simply because he was the first member of cabinet to resign over the issue. Tudor did not succeed Liberal leader Joseph Cook as Leader of the Opposition until 17 February 1917, when the Third Hughes ministry was sworn in with Hughes as leader of the composite Nationalist Party.

== Leader of the Opposition ==
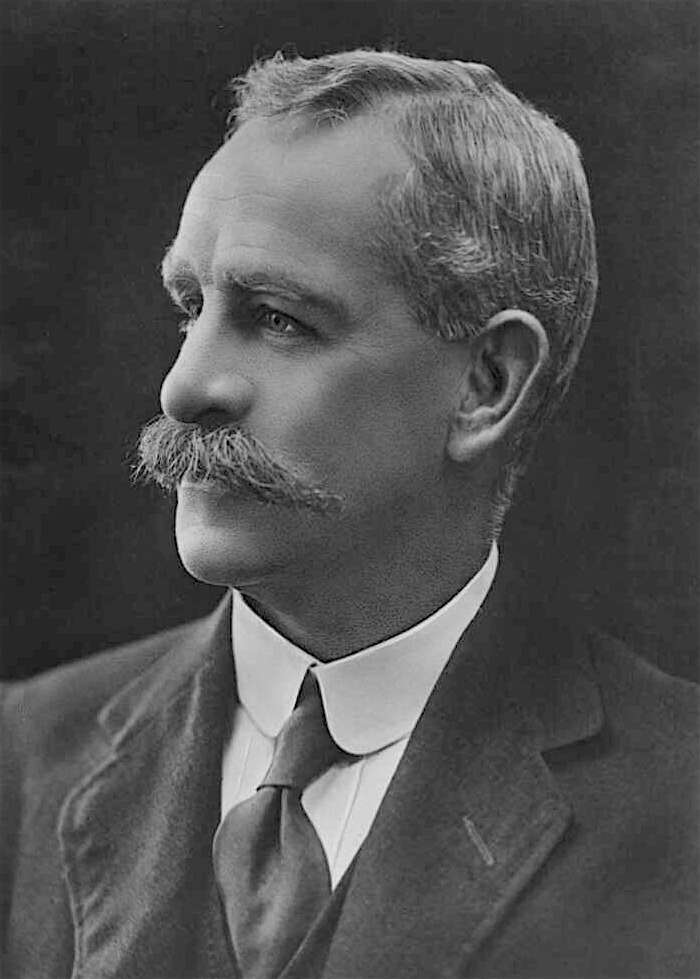
Undated photo

Tudor led his party to a landslide defeat at the 1917 federal election. The ALP won just 22 seats out of 75, and the party was severely weakened by several of its senior figures following Hughes out of the party. Tudor was a leader of the successful "No" campaign at the 1917 conscription referendum. He was not regarded as a good public speaker, and his speeches were often seen as dull or confusing.

While Tudor was respected within the ALP for his loyalty, he was often overshadowed by T. J. Ryan, the charismatic premier of Queensland. Ryan was the only remaining ALP premier in the country, and frequently campaigned outside his own state. In May 1918, Tudor had to officially deny a report in The Age that he would step aside in favour of Ryan prior to the next federal election. There was also some speculation that Fisher – who had been appointed High Commissioner to the United Kingdom – would return and resume the leadership. In May 1919, their former cabinet colleague King O'Malley wrote to Fisher in London that "many people are of the opinion that Labor will not win the next election under Tudor's leadership".

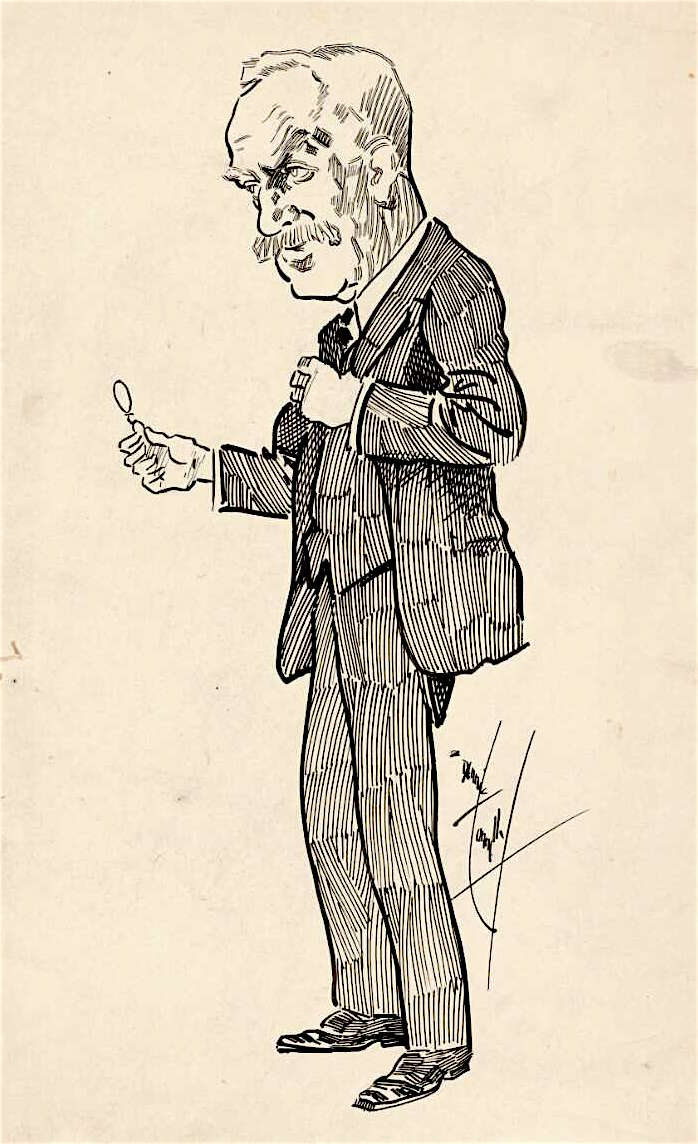
Caricature of Tudor published in 1920

In October 1919, the ALP Federal Conference passed a resolution inviting Ryan to enter federal politics and appointed him as national campaign director. Tudor was "unconsciously insulted" by a number of delegates, who effectively declared that he could not lead Labor to an election victory. His leadership was defended by his supporters in the Victorian delegation, who threatened a walkout, and also by those who viewed the resolution as usurping the role of the party caucus in choosing their leader.

At the election later that year, Tudor led the ALP to a second heavy election loss – 26 seats out of 75. He was twice taken ill during the campaign with "attacks of hemorrhage". Tudor was increasingly seen as an ineffectual leader, and several elements were contemplating replacing him with Ryan. However, Ryan's early death in 1921 prevented him from taking Tudor's place. Tudor's own health became markedly worse during 1921, and he was increasingly unable to carry out his duties. In September 1921, the party elected Matthew Charlton as assistant leader in the House of Representatives.

== Death ==
Tudor died on 10 January 1922 at his home in Richmond, aged 55. His death was attributed to heart disease. He was the first leader of the Labor Party to die in office, and the first Opposition Leader never to become prime minister. He was succeeded as the member for Yarra by future Prime Minister James Scullin. Tudor was the first of five consecutive Opposition Leaders who was not a former prime minister.

Tudor's estate was valued at £4,629 (equivalent to $431,000 in 2022), around half of which was real estate. His widow went bankrupt within the year, after her brother's firm (in which she had invested most of her money) went broke.

Kim Edward Beazley, who wrote a series of articles on ALP leaders for The Canberra Times in 1966, wrote of Tudor that he "held the Labor movement together in the face of massive forces of disintegration, and he did it by his dignity and utter absence of bitterness, hate or rancour".

Parliament of Australia
New division	Member for Yarra; 1901–1922	Succeeded by James Scullin
Political offices
Preceded by Austin Chapman	Minister for Trade and Customs; 1908–1909	Succeeded by Robert Best
Preceded by Robert Best	Minister for Trade and Customs; 1910–1913	Succeeded by Littleton Groom
Preceded by Littleton Groom	Minister for Trade and Customs; 1914–1916	Succeeded by Billy Hughes
Preceded by Joseph Cook	Leader of the Opposition; 1917–1922	Succeeded by Matthew Charlton
Party political offices
Preceded by Billy Hughes	Leader of the Australian Labor Party; 1916–1922	Succeeded by Matthew Charlton
