= Australian Labor Party split of 1916 =

Spilit of the Australian Labor Party in 1916

The Australian Labor Party split of 1916 occurred following severe disagreement within the Australian Labor Party over the issue of proposed World War I conscription in Australia. Labor Prime Minister of Australia Billy Hughes had, by 1916, become an enthusiastic supporter of conscription as a means to boost Australia's contribution to the war effort. On 30 August 1916, he announced plans for a referendum on the issue (the 1916 Australian conscription referendum), and introduced enabling legislation into parliament on 15 September, which passed only with the support of the opposition. Six of Hughes's ministers resigned in protest at the move, and the New South Wales state branch of the Labor Party expelled Hughes. The referendum saw an intense campaign in which Labor figures vehemently advocated on each side of the argument, although the "no" campaign narrowly won on 28 October. In the wake of the referendum defeat, the caucus moved to expel Hughes on 14 November; instead, he and 23 supporters resigned and formed the National Labor Party. Frank Tudor was elected leader of the rump party. Hughes was recommissioned as Prime Minister, heading a minority government supported by the opposition Commonwealth Liberal Party; the two parties then merged as the Nationalist Party of Australia and won the 1917 federal election. The Nationalist Party served as the main conservative party of Australia until 1931, and the split resulted in many early Labor figures ending their careers on the political right. Hughes, for instance, sat as a member of the Nationalists and their successors, the United Australia Party and the Liberal Party, with only a few short breaks until his death in 1952.

The split had different impacts in different states. In Queensland there was no significant split at all, with the state Labor Party having experienced the loss of many early members a decade earlier when William Kidston led a breakaway group out in 1907. During the war Premier T. J. Ryan made strong efforts to minimise losses. Only one member of the state parliament, John Adamson, left the party, and initially there was no attempt to create an alternate vehicle at the state level. However, in October 1919 Adamson was part of the formation of a National Labor Party for ex-Labor supporters that used the name. It had no electoral success and soon disappeared.

== See also ==
- History of the Australian Labor Party § World War I conscription and the split of 1916
- Australian Labor Party split of 1931
- Australian Labor Party split of 1955
- Internationalist–defencist schism
