= National Labor Party =

Former political party in Australia

- Leader: Billy Hughes
- Founded: 14 November 1916; 109 years ago
- Dissolved: 17 February 1917; 109 years ago
- Split from: Australian Labor Party
- Merged into: Nationalist Party
- Headquarters: Canberra
- Ideology: Australian nationalism Interventionism; Social democracy
- Political position: Centre-left
- House of Representatives: 14 / 75 (1916-1917)
- Western Australian Legislative Assembly: 9 / 50 (March 1917)

The National Labor Party (NLP) was an Australian political party formed by Prime Minister Billy Hughes in November 1916, following the 1916 Labor split on the issue of World War I conscription in Australia. Hughes had taken over as leader of the Australian Labor Party and Prime Minister of Australia when anti-conscriptionist Andrew Fisher resigned in 1915. He formed the new party for himself and his followers after he was expelled from the ALP a month after the 1916 plebiscite on conscription in Australia. Hughes held a pro-conscription stance in relation to World War I.

== Formation ==
On 15 September 1916, the executive of the Political Labour League (the Labor Party organisation in New South Wales at the time) expelled Hughes from the Labor Party.

When the Federal Parliamentary Labor caucus met on 14 November 1916, lengthy discussions ensued until Hughes walked out with 24 other Labor members; the remaining 43 members of Caucus then passed their motion of no confidence in the leadership, effectively expelling Hughes and the other members.

Hughes and his followers, who included several early Labor leaders, formed a minority government supported by the Commonwealth Liberal Party, led by another Labor dissident, Joseph Cook. Believing the Labor Party was no longer sufficiently nationalist, they began laying the groundwork for a new party that would be both socially radical and nationalist.

In 1917, Hughes and Cook turned their confidence-and-supply agreement into a formal party, the Nationalist Party of Australia. Hughes became the merged party's leader, with Cook as his deputy. Although it was essentially an upper- and middle-class party dominated by former Liberals, the presence of several Labor men allowed the party to project an image of national unity.

The National Labor Party was never formally constituted itself as a party and had no organisational structure, although some trade union officials and Labor Party branches, particularly in Western Australia and Tasmania, supported it.

== Queensland ==
The Labor Party avoided a split in Queensland due to the efforts of T. J. Ryan to minimise losses. Only one member of the state parliament, John Adamson, left the party and initially there was no attempt to create an alternate vehicle at the state level. However in October 1919, Adamson was part of the formation of a party for ex-Labor supporters that used the name. It had no electoral success and soon disappeared.

== Western Australia ==
The National Labor movement in Western Australia started off as two separate groups—one known as the Labor Solidarity Committee based out of Trades Hall in Perth, and the other known as National Labor and based on the goldfields. The two merged in April–May 1917, with former premier John Scaddan as their leader. However, by July he was without a seat in Parliament, and the party turned to Federal Senators Patrick Lynch, Hugh de Largie and George Pearce for leadership and guidance. Unlike its federal counterpart, it maintained its own distinct identity and structure and worked with the Nationalists as coalition partners. A number of Western Australian unions disaffiliated from the Australian Labor Federation to support the National Labor movement—most notably those representing the engine-drivers, railway employees, boilermakers and carpenters which were powerful in the goldfields. Organisationally, however, the party was believed to be over-dependent on its Senate patrons and struggled to build a genuine extraparliamentary organisation.

The party scored six of 50 Legislative Assembly seats in each of the 1917 and 1921 elections, and held three of 30 Council seats during this period. However, in the 1924 elections, their representation was reduced to one in the Legislative Assembly and two in the Legislative Council — many through the defeat of sitting NLP members by Labor candidates. Later that year, what remained of the party was subsumed by the Nationalists.

== Members of parliament ==
=== House of Representatives ===
==== 1916–1917 ====
- William Archibald (Hindmarsh)
- Fred Bamford (Herbert)
- Reginald Burchell (Fremantle)
- Ernest Carr (Macquarie)
- John Chanter (Riverina)
- George Dankel (Boothby)
- Billy Hughes (West Sydney)
- Jens Jensen (Bass)
- John Lynch (Werriwa)
- Alexander Poynton (Grey)
- William Laird Smith (Denison)
- William Spence (Darling)
- Josiah Thomas (Barrier)
- William Webster (Gwydir)

== See also ==
- Politics of Australia
- Political parties in Australia

== Bibliography ==
- Australian Dictionary of Biography - Billy Hughes
- Cusack, Danny. (2002). With an olive branch and a shillelagh: The political career of Senator Paddy Lynch (1867-1944) (thesis). Murdoch University. Accessed via Murdoch Digital Theses.
- Kirk, Neville. "‘Australians for Australia’: The Right, the Labor Party and Contested Loyalties to Nation and Empire in Australia, 1917 to the Early 1930s." Labour History: A Journal of Labour and Social History 91 (2006): 95-111.
- Perks, Murray. "Lost Debates: The Australian Labor Party and World War I, 1918." Labour History 128 (2025): 53-80.
- Perks, Edgar Murray. "Foreign and Defence Policies and Policy Making in the Australian Labor Parties, 1916-30" (PhD dissertation, Australian National University; ProQuest Dissertations & Theses, 1974. 28826387).
- Robertson, John R. (1958). "The Scaddan government and the conscription crisis, 1911-17 : aspects of Western Australia's political history" (thesis). University of Western Australia. Accessed in Special Collections, Reid Library, UWA.
