= Electoral results for the Division of Darling =

Results for federal electorate of Darling, New South Wales, Australia

This is a list of electoral results for the Division of Darling in Australian federal elections from the division's creation in 1901 until its abolition in 1977.

== Members ==
| Member | Party | Term |
|---|---|---|
| William Spence | Labor | 1901—1916 |
| William Spence | Nationalist | 1916—1917 |
| Arthur Blakeley | Labor | 1917—1934 |
| Joe Clark | Labor (NSW) | 1934—1936 |
| Joe Clark | Labor | 1936—1969 |
| John FitzPatrick | Labor | 1969—1977 |

== Election results ==
=== Elections in the 1970s ===
==== 1975 ====
1975 Australian federal election: Darling
| Party | Candidate | Votes | % | ±% |
|---|---|---|---|---|
| Labor | John FitzPatrick | 25,579 | 56.8 | −2.8 |
| National Country | Walter Mitchell | 18,874 | 41.9 | +17.4 |
| Independent | Walter Miller | 603 | 1.3 | +1.3 |
| Total formal votes | | 45,056 | 98.3 | |
| Informal votes | | 773 | 1.7 | |
| Turnout | | 45,829 | 95.5 | |
Two-party-preferred result
| Labor | John FitzPatrick | | 57.5 | −6.3 |
| National Country | Walter Mitchell | | 42.5 | +6.3 |
| Labor hold | | Swing | −6.3 | |

==== 1974 ====
1974 Australian federal election: Darling
| Party | Candidate | Votes | % | ±% |
|---|---|---|---|---|
| Labor | John FitzPatrick | 26,188 | 59.6 | −1.4 |
| Country | Max Overton | 10,750 | 24.5 | +2.0 |
| Liberal | William Thornton | 5,143 | 11.7 | +2.0 |
| Australia | Peter Farry | 1,871 | 4.3 | +4.3 |
| Total formal votes | | 43,952 | 97.9 | |
| Informal votes | | 937 | 2.1 | |
| Turnout | | 44,889 | 94.9 | |
Two-party-preferred result
| Labor | John FitzPatrick | | 63.8 | +0.7 |
| Country | Max Overton | | 36.2 | −0.7 |
| Labor hold | | Swing | +0.7 | |

==== 1972 ====
1972 Australian federal election: Darling
| Party | Candidate | Votes | % | ±% |
|---|---|---|---|---|
| Labor | John FitzPatrick | 25,310 | 61.0 | +3.5 |
| Country | Max Overton | 9,360 | 22.5 | −1.0 |
| Liberal | James Donohoe | 4,029 | 9.7 | −9.3 |
| Democratic Labor | John Darcy | 2,826 | 6.8 | +6.8 |
| Total formal votes | | 41,525 | 98.4 | |
| Informal votes | | 682 | 1.6 | |
| Turnout | | 42,207 | 95.1 | |
Two-party-preferred result
| Labor | John FitzPatrick | | 63.1 | +2.8 |
| Country | Max Overton | | 36.9 | −2.8 |
| Labor hold | | Swing | +2.8 | |

=== Elections in the 1960s ===
==== 1969 ====
1969 Australian federal election: Darling
| Party | Candidate | Votes | % | ±% |
|---|---|---|---|---|
| Labor | John FitzPatrick | 23,168 | 57.5 | +1.1 |
| Country | Max Overton | 9,474 | 23.5 | +23.5 |
| Liberal | Jack Bonney | 7,650 | 19.0 | −21.8 |
| Total formal votes | | 40,292 | 98.4 | |
| Informal votes | | 642 | 1.6 | |
| Turnout | | 40,934 | 94.3 | |
Two-party-preferred result
| Labor | John FitzPatrick | | 60.3 | +2.2 |
| Country | Max Overton | | 39.7 | −2.2 |
| Labor hold | | Swing | +2.2 | |

==== 1966 ====
1966 Australian federal election: Darling
| Party | Candidate | Votes | % | ±% |
|---|---|---|---|---|
| Labor | Joe Clark | 20,848 | 60.3 | −7.1 |
| Liberal | Allan Connell | 13,714 | 39.7 | +39.7 |
| Total formal votes | | 34,562 | 97.5 | |
| Informal votes | | 900 | 2.5 | |
| Turnout | | 35,462 | 93.5 | |
| Labor hold | | Swing | −7.1 | |

==== 1963 ====
1963 Australian federal election: Darling
| Party | Candidate | Votes | % | ±% |
|---|---|---|---|---|
| Labor | Joe Clark | 23,352 | 67.4 | −5.2 |
| Country | Frederick Harding | 11,299 | 32.6 | +5.2 |
| Total formal votes | | 34,651 | 98.8 | |
| Informal votes | | 424 | 1.2 | |
| Turnout | | 35,075 | 93.2 | |
| Labor hold | | Swing | −5.2 | |

==== 1961 ====
1961 Australian federal election: Darling
| Party | Candidate | Votes | % | ±% |
|---|---|---|---|---|
| Labor | Joe Clark | 25,235 | 72.6 | +2.1 |
| Country | Rodan Dawson | 9,537 | 37.4 | +1.7 |
| Total formal votes | | 34,772 | 97.4 | |
| Informal votes | | 918 | 2.6 | |
| Turnout | | 35,690 | 93.6 | |
| Labor hold | | Swing | +0.2 | |

=== Elections in the 1950s ===
==== 1958 ====
1958 Australian federal election: Darling
| Party | Candidate | Votes | % | ±% |
|---|---|---|---|---|
| Labor | Joe Clark | 24,815 | 70.5 | +3.0 |
| Country | Elson Whyte | 9,055 | 25.7 | −6.8 |
| Independent | Francis O'Donnell | 1,349 | 3.8 | +3.8 |
| Total formal votes | | 35,219 | 97.1 | |
| Informal votes | | 1,041 | 2.9 | |
| Turnout | | 36,260 | 93.3 | |
Two-party-preferred result
| Labor | Joe Clark | | 72.4 | +4.9 |
| Country | Elson Whyte | | 27.6 | −4.9 |
| Labor hold | | Swing | +4.9 | |

==== 1955 ====
1955 Australian federal election: Darling
| Party | Candidate | Votes | % | ±% |
|---|---|---|---|---|
| Labor | Joe Clark | 23,428 | 67.5 | −3.2 |
| Country | Ewen Martin | 11,282 | 32.5 | +3.2 |
| Total formal votes | | 34,710 | 97.2 | |
| Informal votes | | 1,005 | 2.8 | |
| Turnout | | 35,715 | 93.1 | |
| Labor hold | | Swing | −3.2 | |

==== 1954 ====
1954 Australian federal election: Darling
| Party | Candidate | Votes | % | ±% |
|---|---|---|---|---|
| Labor | Joe Clark | 23,875 | 70.5 | +1.7 |
| Country | Rodan Dawson | 10,012 | 29.5 | −1.7 |
| Total formal votes | | 33,887 | 98.2 | |
| Informal votes | | 607 | 1.8 | |
| Turnout | | 34,494 | 93.9 | |
| Labor hold | | Swing | +1.7 | |

==== 1951 ====
1951 Australian federal election: Darling
| Party | Candidate | Votes | % | ±% |
|---|---|---|---|---|
| Labor | Joe Clark | 22,610 | 68.8 | +5.0 |
| Country | Elson Whyte | 10,253 | 31.2 | −0.5 |
| Total formal votes | | 32,863 | 97.4 | |
| Informal votes | | 864 | 2.6 | |
| Turnout | | 33,727 | 94.5 | |
| Labor hold | | Swing | +1.5 | |

=== Elections in the 1940s ===
==== 1949 ====
1949 Australian federal election: Darling
| Party | Candidate | Votes | % | ±% |
|---|---|---|---|---|
| Labor | Joe Clark | 20,843 | 63.8 | −2.7 |
| Country | Elson Whyte | 10,348 | 31.7 | +9.7 |
| Communist | Cecil Connors | 1,017 | 3.1 | +3.1 |
| Independent | Madge Roberts | 450 | 1.4 | +1.4 |
| Total formal votes | | 32,658 | 97.2 | |
| Informal votes | | 929 | 2.8 | |
| Turnout | | 33,587 | 94.7 | |
Two-party-preferred result
| Labor | Joe Clark | | 67.3 | −3.0 |
| Country | Elson Whyte | | 32.7 | +3.0 |
| Labor hold | | Swing | −3.0 | |

==== 1946 ====
1946 Australian federal election: Darling
| Party | Candidate | Votes | % | ±% |
|---|---|---|---|---|
| Labor | Joe Clark | 27,449 | 60.7 | −10.9 |
| Country | John McGirr | 12,229 | 27.0 | +27.0 |
| Protestant People | Cyril Glassop | 5,533 | 12.2 | +12.2 |
| Total formal votes | | 45,211 | 97.7 | |
| Informal votes | | 1,058 | 2.3 | |
| Turnout | | 46,269 | 89.8 | |
Two-party-preferred result
| Labor | Joe Clark | | 66.8 | −4.8 |
| Country | John McGirr | | 32.2 | +32.2 |
| Labor hold | | Swing | −4.8 | |

==== 1943 ====
1943 Australian federal election: Darling
| Party | Candidate | Votes | % | ±% |
|---|---|---|---|---|
| Labor | Joe Clark | 32,540 | 71.6 | +8.2 |
| One Parliament | James Butler | 12,936 | 28.4 | +28.4 |
| Total formal votes | | 45,476 | 97.5 | |
| Informal votes | | 1,180 | 2.5 | |
| Turnout | | 46,656 | 90.9 | |
| Labor hold | | Swing | −1.9 | |

==== 1940 ====
1940 Australian federal election: Darling
| Party | Candidate | Votes | % | ±% |
|---|---|---|---|---|
| Labor | Joe Clark | 29,128 | 63.4 | −2.8 |
| Independent | Alexander Huie | 10,648 | 23.2 | −10.6 |
| Labor (N-C) | Les Murphy | 6,158 | 13.4 | +13.4 |
| Total formal votes | | 45,934 | 97.4 | |
| Informal votes | | 1,229 | 2.6 | |
| Turnout | | 47,163 | 87.3 | |
Two-party-preferred result
| Labor | Joe Clark | | 73.5 | +7.3 |
| Independent | Alexander Huie | | 26.5 | −7.3 |
| Labor hold | | Swing | +7.3 | |

=== Elections in the 1930s ===
==== 1937 ====
1937 Australian federal election: Darling
| Party | Candidate | Votes | % | ±% |
|---|---|---|---|---|
| Labor | Joe Clark | 32,515 | 66.2 | +37.6 |
| Independent | Alexander Huie | 16,581 | 33.8 | +33.8 |
| Total formal votes | | 49,096 | 97.3 | |
| Informal votes | | 1,347 | 2.7 | |
| Turnout | | 50,443 | 94.6 | |
| Labor gain from Labor (NSW) | | Swing | +66.2 | |

==== 1934 ====
1934 Australian federal election: Darling
| Party | Candidate | Votes | % | ±% |
|---|---|---|---|---|
| Labor (NSW) | Joe Clark | 18,208 | 40.0 | +14.9 |
| Country | Paul Goldenstedt | 13,567 | 29.8 | −6.9 |
| Labor | Arthur Blakeley | 13,016 | 28.6 | −8.4 |
| Communist | Stuart Coombe | 758 | 1.7 | +0.5 |
| Total formal votes | | 45,549 | 96.5 | |
| Informal votes | | 1,662 | 3.5 | |
| Turnout | | 47,211 | 93.0 | |
Two-party-preferred result
| Labor (NSW) | Joe Clark | 28,944 | 63.5 | +63.5 |
| Country | Paul Goldenstedt | 16,605 | 36.5 | −2.8 |
| Labor (NSW) gain from Labor | | Swing | +63.5 | |

==== 1931 ====
1931 Australian federal election: Darling
| Party | Candidate | Votes | % | ±% |
|---|---|---|---|---|
| Labor | Arthur Blakeley | 14,581 | 40.8 | −29.4 |
| Country | Harold Campbell | 11,847 | 33.1 | +33.1 |
| Labor (NSW) | Richard Quintrell | 8,795 | 24.6 | +24.6 |
| Communist | Ted Tripp | 522 | 1.5 | +1.5 |
| Total formal votes | | 35,745 | 94.8 | |
| Informal votes | | 1,950 | 5.2 | |
| Turnout | | 37,695 | 92.3 | |
Two-party-preferred result
| Labor | Arthur Blakeley | 22,828 | 63.9 | −6.3 |
| Country | Harold Campbell | 12,917 | 36.1 | +6.3 |
| Labor hold | | Swing | −6.3 | |

=== Elections in the 1920s ===
==== 1929 ====
1929 Australian federal election: Darling
| Party | Candidate | Votes | % | ±% |
|---|---|---|---|---|
| Labor | Arthur Blakeley | 24,124 | 70.2 | −0.7 |
| Nationalist | Brian Doe | 10,259 | 29.8 | +0.7 |
| Total formal votes | | 34,383 | 96.6 | |
| Informal votes | | 1,215 | 3.4 | |
| Turnout | | 35,598 | 90.0 | |
| Labor hold | | Swing | −0.7 | |

==== 1928 ====
1928 Australian federal election: Darling
| Party | Candidate | Votes | % | ±% |
|---|---|---|---|---|
| Labor | Arthur Blakeley | 24,056 | 70.9 | +5.4 |
| Nationalist | Frederick Drury | 9,862 | 29.1 | −5.4 |
| Total formal votes | | 33,918 | 94.7 | |
| Informal votes | | 1,881 | 5.3 | |
| Turnout | | 35,799 | 86.9 | |
| Labor hold | | Swing | +5.4 | |

==== 1925 ====
1925 Australian federal election: Darling
| Party | Candidate | Votes | % | ±% |
|---|---|---|---|---|
| Labor | Arthur Blakeley | 20,965 | 65.5 | +20.2 |
| Nationalist | John Dowling | 11,043 | 34.5 | +2.0 |
| Total formal votes | | 32,008 | 97.6 | |
| Informal votes | | 777 | 2.4 | |
| Turnout | | 32,785 | 80.8 | |
| Labor hold | | Swing | +0.4 | |

==== 1922 ====
1922 Australian federal election: Darling
| Party | Candidate | Votes | % | ±% |
|---|---|---|---|---|
| Labor | Arthur Blakeley | 8,820 | 45.3 | −16.5 |
| Nationalist | Walter Wright | 6,329 | 32.5 | −5.7 |
| Industrial Labor | Michael Considine | 4,331 | 22.2 | +22.2 |
| Total formal votes | | 19,480 | 95.2 | |
| Informal votes | | 976 | 4.8 | |
| Turnout | | 20,456 | 55.3 | |
Two-party-preferred result
| Labor | Arthur Blakeley | 12,682 | 65.1 | +3.3 |
| Nationalist | Walter Wright | 6,798 | 34.9 | −3.3 |
| Labor hold | | Swing | +3.3 | |

=== Elections in the 1910s ===
==== 1919 ====
1919 Australian federal election: Darling
| Party | Candidate | Votes | % | ±% |
|---|---|---|---|---|
| Labor | Arthur Blakeley | 11,344 | 61.8 | +8.5 |
| Nationalist | Alfred Perkins | 7,004 | 38.2 | −8.5 |
| Total formal votes | | 18,348 | 97.8 | |
| Informal votes | | 417 | 2.2 | |
| Turnout | | 18,765 | 67.8 | |
| Labor hold | | Swing | +8.5 | |

==== 1917 ====
1917 Australian federal election: Darling
| Party | Candidate | Votes | % | ±% |
|---|---|---|---|---|
| Labor | Arthur Blakeley | 11,523 | 53.3 | −7.2 |
| Nationalist | William Spence | 10,081 | 46.7 | +7.2 |
| Total formal votes | | 21,604 | 97.1 | |
| Informal votes | | 651 | 2.9 | |
| Turnout | | 22,255 | 74.7 | |
| Labor hold | | Swing | −7.2 | |

==== 1914 ====
1914 Australian federal election: Darling
| Party | Candidate | Votes | % | ±% |
|---|---|---|---|---|
| Labor | William Spence | 12,309 | 60.5 | +0.0 |
| Liberal | William Kelk | 8,036 | 39.5 | −0.0 |
| Total formal votes | | 20,345 | 96.1 | |
| Informal votes | | 818 | 3.9 | |
| Turnout | | 21,163 | 69.5 | |
| Labor hold | | Swing | +0.0 | |

==== 1913 ====
1913 Australian federal election: Darling
| Party | Candidate | Votes | % | ±% |
|---|---|---|---|---|
| Labor | William Spence | 11,582 | 60.5 | −4.2 |
| Liberal | Edwin Townsend | 7,560 | 39.5 | +4.2 |
| Total formal votes | | 19,142 | 95.3 | |
| Informal votes | | 942 | 4.7 | |
| Turnout | | 20,081 | 62.7 | |
| Labor hold | | Swing | −4.2 | |

==== 1910 ====
1910 Australian federal election: Darling
| Party | Candidate | Votes | % | ±% |
|---|---|---|---|---|
| Labour | William Spence | 9,551 | 64.7 | +6.8 |
| Liberal | James Carroll | 5,222 | 35.3 | −6.8 |
| Total formal votes | | 14,773 | 96.8 | |
| Informal votes | | 493 | 3.2 | |
| Turnout | | 15,266 | 54.8 | |
| Labour hold | | Swing | +6.8 | |

=== Elections in the 1900s ===
==== 1906 ====
1906 Australian federal election: Darling
| Party | Candidate | Votes | % | ±% |
|---|---|---|---|---|
| Labour | William Spence | 6,356 | 57.9 | −0.3 |
| Anti-Socialist | Denis Acton | 4,626 | 42.1 | +0.3 |
| Total formal votes | | 10,982 | 95.4 | |
| Informal votes | | 532 | 4.6 | |
| Turnout | | 11,514 | 43.9 | |
| Labour hold | | Swing | −0.3 | |

==== 1903 ====
1903 Australian federal election: Darling
| Party | Candidate | Votes | % | ±% |
|---|---|---|---|---|
| Labour | William Spence | 3,148 | 58.2 | +13.8 |
| Free Trade | Denis Acton | 2,263 | 41.8 | +10.8 |
| Total formal votes | | 5,411 | 96.9 | |
| Informal votes | | 171 | 3.1 | |
| Turnout | | 5,582 | 36.6 | |
| Labour hold | | Swing | +1.5 | |

==== 1901 ====
1901 Australian federal election: Darling
| Party | Candidate | Votes | % | ±% |
|---|---|---|---|---|
| Labour | William Spence | 2,206 | 44.4 | +44.4 |
| Free Trade | Thomas Bertram | 1,537 | 31.0 | +31.0 |
| Protectionist | Patrick Quinn | 1,221 | 24.6 | +24.6 |
| Total formal votes | | 4,964 | 97.5 | |
| Informal votes | | 128 | 2.5 | |
| Turnout | | 5,092 | 57.0 | |
| Labour win | | (new seat) | | |
