= Electoral results for the district of Alma =

Election results for Alma, New South Wales, Australia

Electoral district of Alma, an electoral district of the Legislative Assembly in the Australian state of New South Wales, was created in 1894 and abolished in 1904.

== Members ==
Election	Member	Party
1894	Josiah Thomas	Labour
1895	Josiah Thomas	Labour
1898	Josiah Thomas	Labour
1901	William Williams	Independent Labour

== Election results ==
=== Elections in the 1900s ===
==== 1901 ====
1901 New South Wales state election: Alma
Party	Candidate	Votes	%	±%
Independent Labour	William Williams	874	52.0	
Labour	Jabez Wright	783	46.6	−42.0
Independent	William Colliss	25	1.5	+1.5
Total formal votes		1,682	100	+2.8
Informal votes		0	0	−2.8
Turnout		1,682	64.2	+18.8
Independent Labour gain from Labour				

The sitting member was Josiah Thomas (Labour) who did not contest the election as he had been elected in March 1901 to the federal seat of Barrier which included Broken Hill. William Williams nominated as an Independent Labor candidate after friction between local branches and the Barrier District Assembly.

=== Elections in the 1890s ===
==== 1898 ====
1898 New South Wales colonial election: Alma
Party	Candidate	Votes	%	±%
Labour	Josiah Thomas	1,002	88.6	
National Federal	William Harding	126	11.1	
Independent	Charles Counsell	3	0.3	
Total formal votes		1,131	97.2	
Informal votes		33	2.8	
Turnout		1,164	45.4	
Labour hold				

==== 1895 ====
1895 New South Wales colonial election: Alma
Party	Candidate	Votes	%	±%
Labour	Josiah Thomas	unopposed		
Labour hold				

==== 1894 ====
1894 New South Wales colonial election: Alma
Party	Candidate	Votes	%	±%
Labour	Josiah Thomas	1,442	79.0	
Protectionist	Thomas Coombe	313	17.1	
Independent	Charles Pound	71	3.9	
Total formal votes		1,826	98.8	
Informal votes		22	1.2	
Turnout		1,848	89.8	
Labour win		(new seat)		
