= 1917 Australian House of Representatives election =

Australian federal election, 5 May 1917 House of Representatives << 1914–1919 >>
Enrolled voters	2,835,327				
Votes cast	1,934,478		Turnout	78.30	+4.77
Informal votes	51,044		Informal	2.64	+0.32
Summary of votes by party
Party	Primary votes	%	Swing	Seats	Change
Nationalist	1,021,138	54.22%	+7.01%	53	+ 21
Labor	827,541	43.94%	–6.96%	22	– 20
Independent	34,755	1.85%	–0.04%	0	– 0
Total	1,883,434			75	

This is a list of electoral division results for the Australian 1917 federal election.

== New South Wales ==
=== Barrier ===
1917 Australian federal election: Barrier
Party	Candidate	Votes	%	±%
Labor	Michael Considine	9,710	49.9	−29.8
Ind. Nationalist	William Montgomery	8,734	44.9	+44.9
Nationalist	Brian Doe	1,004	5.2	−15.1
Total formal votes		19,448	97.5	
Informal votes		502	2.5	
Turnout		19,950	60.3	
Labor hold		Swing	−27.2	

=== Calare ===
1917 Australian federal election: Calare
Party	Candidate	Votes	%	±%
Nationalist	Henry Pigott	13,222	51.8	+0.6
Labor	Thomas Lavelle	12,320	48.2	−0.6
Total formal votes		25,542	97.3	
Informal votes		717	2.7	
Turnout		26,259	80.3	
Nationalist hold		Swing	+0.6	

=== Cook ===
1917 Australian federal election: Cook
Party	Candidate	Votes	%	±%
Labor	James Catts	18,101	64.4	+3.7
Nationalist	Richard Sleath	9,985	35.6	−1.8
Total formal votes		28,086	96.7	
Informal votes		950	3.3	
Turnout		29,036	70.7	
Labor hold		Swing	+2.7	

=== Cowper ===
1917 Australian federal election: Cowper
Party	Candidate	Votes	%	±%
Nationalist	John Thomson	unopposed		
Nationalist hold		Swing		

=== Dalley ===
1917 Australian federal election: Dalley
Party	Candidate	Votes	%	±%
Labor	William Mahony	15,658	54.0	−7.3
Nationalist	Albert Lane	13,352	46.0	+7.3
Total formal votes		29,010	97.2	
Informal votes		845	2.8	
Turnout		29,855	72.3	
Labor hold		Swing	−7.3	

=== Darling ===
1917 Australian federal election: Darling
Party	Candidate	Votes	%	±%
Labor	Arthur Blakeley	11,523	53.3	−7.2
Nationalist	William Spence	10,081	46.7	+7.2
Total formal votes		21,604	97.1	
Informal votes		651	2.9	
Turnout		22,255	74.7	
Labor hold		Swing	−7.2	

=== East Sydney ===
1917 Australian federal election: East Sydney
Party	Candidate	Votes	%	±%
Labor	John West	unopposed		
Labor hold		Swing		

=== Eden-Monaro ===
1917 Australian federal election: Eden-Monaro
Party	Candidate	Votes	%	±%
Nationalist	Austin Chapman	12,879	57.2	−2.0
Labor	John Bailey	9,623	42.8	+2.0
Total formal votes		22,502	97.7	
Informal votes		521	2.3	
Turnout		23,023	77.4	
Nationalist hold		Swing	−2.0	

=== Gwydir ===
1917 Australian federal election: Gwydir
Party	Candidate	Votes	%	±%
Nationalist	William Webster	13,275	56.5	+10.3
Labor	Cecil Last	10,239	43.5	−10.3
Total formal votes		23,514	96.8	
Informal votes		781	3.2	
Turnout		24,295	69.4	
Nationalist gain from Labor		Swing	+10.3	

=== Hume ===
1917 Australian federal election: Hume
Party	Candidate	Votes	%	±%
Nationalist	Franc Falkiner	13,714	51.9	+0.9
Labor	Robert Cruickshank	12,732	48.1	−0.9
Total formal votes		26,446	97.2	
Informal votes		772	2.8	
Turnout		27,218	75.1	
Nationalist hold		Swing	+0.9	

=== Hunter ===
1917 Australian federal election: Hunter
Party	Candidate	Votes	%	±%
Labor	Matthew Charlton	13,327	53.4	−1.2
Nationalist	William Ferguson	11,633	46.6	+1.2
Total formal votes		24,960	97.7	
Informal votes		585	2.3	
Turnout		25,545	67.8	
Labor hold		Swing	−1.2	

=== Illawarra ===
1917 Australian federal election: Illawarra
Party	Candidate	Votes	%	±%
Nationalist	Hector Lamond	19,301	54.3	+8.5
Labor	George Burns	16,243	45.7	−8.5
Total formal votes		35,544	97.8	
Informal votes		802	2.2	
Turnout		36,346	75.7	
Nationalist gain from Labor		Swing	+8.5	

=== Lang ===
1917 Australian federal election: Lang
Party	Candidate	Votes	%	±%
Nationalist	Elliot Johnson	21,495	60.4	+6.9
Labor	Percy Evans	14,081	39.6	−6.9
Total formal votes		35,576	97.8	
Informal votes		1,030	2.8	
Turnout		36,606	72.7	
Nationalist hold		Swing	+6.9	

=== Macquarie ===
1917 Australian federal election: Macquarie
Party	Candidate	Votes	%	±%
Labor	Samuel Nicholls	13,566	50.0	−3.3
Nationalist	Ernest Carr	13,557	50.0	+3.3
Total formal votes		27,123	97.6	
Informal votes		655	2.4	
Turnout		27,778	76.3	
Labor hold		Swing	−3.3	

=== Nepean ===
1917 Australian federal election: Nepean
Party	Candidate	Votes	%	±%
Nationalist	Richard Orchard	22,402	60.5	+7.8
Labor	Tom Arthur	14,600	39.5	−7.8
Total formal votes		37,002	97.3	
Informal votes		1,034	2.7	
Turnout		38,036	72.8	
Nationalist hold		Swing	+7.8	

=== New England ===
1917 Australian federal election: New England
Party	Candidate	Votes	%	±%
Nationalist	Percy Abbott	unopposed		
Nationalist hold		Swing		

=== Newcastle ===
1917 Australian federal election: Newcastle
Party	Candidate	Votes	%	±%
Labor	David Watkins	17,643	58.0	−42.0
Nationalist	Arthur Griffith	12,784	42.0	+42.0
Total formal votes		30,427	97.5	
Informal votes		789	2.5	
Turnout		31,216	69.5	
Labor hold		Swing	−42.0	

=== North Sydney ===
1917 Australian federal election: North Sydney
Party	Candidate	Votes	%	±%
Nationalist	Granville Ryrie	unopposed		
Nationalist hold		Swing		

=== Parkes ===
1917 Australian federal election: Parkes
Party	Candidate	Votes	%	±%
Nationalist	Bruce Smith	26,432	65.4	+6.9
Labor	Mark Gosling	13,982	34.6	−6.9
Total formal votes		40,414	96.9	
Informal votes		1,288	3.1	
Turnout		41,702	68.8	
Nationalist hold		Swing	+6.9	

=== Parramatta ===
1917 Australian federal election: Parramatta
Party	Candidate	Votes	%	±%
Nationalist	Joseph Cook	26,869	73.8	−26.2
Independent	Alfred Conroy	9,551	26.2	+26.2
Total formal votes		36,420	95.8	
Informal votes		1,585	4.2	
Turnout		38,005	70.9	
Nationalist hold		Swing	−26.2	

=== Richmond ===
1917 Australian federal election: Richmond
Party	Candidate	Votes	%	±%
Nationalist	Walter Massy-Greene	17,732	75.2	−24.8
Labor	John Steele	5,843	24.8	+24.8
Total formal votes		23,575	96.1	
Informal votes		966	3.9	
Turnout		24,541	71.3	
Nationalist hold		Swing	−24.8	

=== Riverina ===
1917 Australian federal election: Riverina
Party	Candidate	Votes	%	±%
Nationalist	John Chanter	14,140	59.2	+11.3
Labor	Arthur Williams	9,726	40.8	−11.3
Total formal votes		23,866	96.8	
Informal votes		786	3.2	
Turnout		24,652	70.6	
Nationalist gain from Labor		Swing	+11.3	

=== Robertson ===
1917 Australian federal election: Robertson
Party	Candidate	Votes	%	±%
Nationalist	William Fleming	12,827	56.2	+2.8
Labor	Eva Seery	10,008	43.8	−2.8
Total formal votes		22,835	97.2	
Informal votes		655	2.8	
Turnout		23,490	71.6	
Nationalist hold		Swing	+2.8	

=== South Sydney ===
1917 Australian federal election: South Sydney
Party	Candidate	Votes	%	±%
Labor	Edward Riley	17,056	63.3	−5.5
Nationalist	Alick Kay	9,898	36.7	−5.5
Total formal votes		26,954	96.0	
Informal votes		1,112	4.0	
Turnout		28,066	65.8	
Labor hold		Swing	−5.5	

=== Wentworth ===
1917 Australian federal election: Wentworth
Party	Candidate	Votes	%	±%
Nationalist	Willie Kelly	22,653	68.5	+12.0
Labor	Henrietta Greville	10,437	31.5	−12.0
Total formal votes		33,090	96.1	
Informal votes		1,340	3.9	
Turnout		64,430	67.4	
Nationalist hold		Swing	+12.0	

=== Werriwa ===
1917 Australian federal election: Werriwa
Party	Candidate	Votes	%	±%
Nationalist	John Lynch	14,607	52.8	+2.8
Labor	Jack Christopher	13,071	47.2	−2.8
Total formal votes		27,678	97.3	
Informal votes		769	2.7	
Turnout		28,447	75.9	
Nationalist gain from Labor		Swing	+2.8	

=== West Sydney ===
1917 Australian federal election: West Sydney
Party	Candidate	Votes	%	±%
Labor	Con Wallace	14,664	66.5	−8.8
Nationalist	Gideon Gillespie	7,389	33.5	+8.8
Total formal votes		22,053	96.8	
Informal votes		739	3.2	
Turnout		22,792	63.4	
Labor hold		Swing	−8.8	

== Victoria ==
=== Balaclava ===
1917 Australian federal election: Balaclava
Party	Candidate	Votes	%	±%
Nationalist	William Watt	23,308	66.6	+8.2
Labor	Alfred Foster	11,690	33.4	−8.2
Total formal votes		34,998	97.6	
Informal votes		848	2.4	
Turnout		35,846	84.0	
Nationalist hold		Swing	+8.2	

=== Ballaarat ===
1917 Australian federal election: Ballaarat
Party	Candidate	Votes	%	±%
Labor	Charles McGrath	unopposed		
Labor hold		Swing		

=== Batman ===
1917 Australian federal election: Batman
Party	Candidate	Votes	%	±%
Labor	Frank Brennan	18,868	60.9	−39.1
Nationalist	Frederick O'Neill	12,098	39.1	+39.1
Total formal votes		30,966	97.0	
Informal votes		950	3.0	
Turnout		31,916	88.9	
Labor hold		Swing	−39.1	

=== Bendigo ===
1917 Australian federal election: Bendigo
Party	Candidate	Votes	%	±%
Nationalist	Billy Hughes	16,272	57.4	+12.5
Labor	Alfred Hampson	12,091	42.6	−12.5
Total formal votes		28,363	97.9	
Informal votes		618	2.1	
Turnout		28,981	89.7	
Nationalist gain from Labor		Swing	+12.5	

=== Bourke ===
1917 Australian federal election: Bourke
Party	Candidate	Votes	%	±%
Labor	Frank Anstey	22,814	54.5	−11.4
Nationalist	Arthur May	19,033	45.5	+11.4
Total formal votes		41,847	98.6	
Informal votes		596	1.4	
Turnout		42,443	83.5	
Labor hold		Swing	−11.4	

=== Corangamite ===
1917 Australian federal election: Corangamite
Party	Candidate	Votes	%	±%
Nationalist	Chester Manifold	18,432	60.4	+8.8
Labor	Christopher Bennett	12,067	39.6	−8.8
Total formal votes		30,499	98.2	
Informal votes		562	1.8	
Turnout		31,061	84.6	
Nationalist hold		Swing	+8.8	

=== Corio ===
1917 Australian federal election: Corio
Party	Candidate	Votes	%	±%
Nationalist	John Lister	18,902	57.3	+8.5
Labor	Alfred Ozanne	14,102	42.7	−8.5
Total formal votes		33,004	98.4	
Informal votes		536	1.6	
Turnout		33,540	86.8	
Nationalist gain from Labor		Swing	+8.5	

=== Echuca ===
1917 Australian federal election: Echuca
Party	Candidate	Votes	%	±%
Nationalist	Albert Palmer	17,585	60.7	+2.5
Labor	Thomas Power	11,371	39.3	−2.5
Total formal votes		28,956	98.1	
Informal votes		554	1.9	
Turnout		29,510	83.3	
Nationalist hold		Swing	+2.5	

=== Fawkner ===
1917 Australian federal election: Fawkner
Party	Candidate	Votes	%	±%
Nationalist	George Maxwell	16,907	51.1	+10.4
Labor	Joseph Hannan	15,976	48.3	−11.0
Independent	Frank Henty	203	0.6	+0.6
Total formal votes		33,086	97.2	
Informal votes		959	2.8	
Turnout		34,045	84.7	
Nationalist gain from Labor		Swing	+10.7	

=== Flinders ===
1917 Australian federal election: Flinders
Party	Candidate	Votes	%	±%
Nationalist	Sir William Irvine	19,398	61.2	+8.5
Labor	David Russell	12,322	38.8	−8.5
Total formal votes		31,720	97.7	
Informal votes		762	2.3	
Turnout		32,482	80.3	
Nationalist hold		Swing	+8.5	

=== Gippsland ===
1917 Australian federal election: Gippsland
Party	Candidate	Votes	%	±%
Nationalist	George Wise	21,851	72.7	+23.7
Labor	Thomas Holloway	8,215	27.3	+27.3
Total formal votes		30,066	98.3	
Informal votes		518	1.7	
Turnout		30,584	84.6	
Nationalist gain from Independent Labor		Swing	+24.7	

=== Grampians ===
1917 Australian federal election: Grampians
Party	Candidate	Votes	%	±%
Nationalist	Carty Salmon	15,089	57.0	+7.3
Labor	John McDougall	11,390	43.0	−7.3
Total formal votes		26,479	98.1	
Informal votes		509	1.9	
Turnout		26,988	84.4	
Nationalist hold		Swing	+7.3	

=== Henty ===
1917 Australian federal election: Henty
Party	Candidate	Votes	%	±%
Nationalist	James Boyd	30,119	70.6	+17.8
Labor	William Smith	12,526	29.4	−8.1
Total formal votes		42,645	97.9	
Informal votes		908	2.1	
Turnout		43,553	81.6	
Nationalist hold		Swing	+12.9	

=== Indi ===
1917 Australian federal election: Indi
Party	Candidate	Votes	%	±%
Nationalist	John Leckie	16,216	56.2	+7.2
Labor	Parker Moloney	12,639	43.8	−7.2
Total formal votes		28,855	98.6	
Informal votes		422	1.4	
Turnout		29,277	89.5	
Nationalist gain from Labor		Swing	+7.2	

=== Kooyong ===
1917 Australian federal election: Kooyong
Party	Candidate	Votes	%	±%
Nationalist	Sir Robert Best	unopposed		
Nationalist hold		Swing		

=== Maribyrnong ===
1917 Australian federal election: Maribyrnong
Party	Candidate	Votes	%	±%
Labor	James Fenton	20,156	52.2	−12.1
Nationalist	Edmund Jowett	18,483	47.8	+12.1
Total formal votes		38,639	98.3	
Informal votes		675	1.7	
Turnout		39,314	84.7	
Labor hold		Swing	−12.1	

=== Melbourne ===
1917 Australian federal election: Melbourne
Party	Candidate	Votes	%	±%
Labor	William Maloney	16,871	60.3	−9.0
Nationalist	Reginald Tracey	11,130	39.7	+9.0
Total formal votes		28,001	97.1	
Informal votes		842	2.9	
Turnout		28,843	80.6	
Labor hold		Swing	−9.0	

=== Melbourne Ports ===
1917 Australian federal election: Melbourne Ports
Party	Candidate	Votes	%	±%
Labor	James Mathews	22,689	66.3	−33.7
Nationalist	William Fozard	11,557	33.7	+33.7
Total formal votes		34,246	97.7	
Informal votes		801	2.3	
Turnout		35,047	80.5	
Labor hold		Swing	−33.7	

=== Wannon ===
1917 Australian federal election: Wannon
Party	Candidate	Votes	%	±%
Nationalist	Arthur Rodgers	15,597	54.8	+1.2
Labor	Egerton Holden	12,888	45.2	−1.2
Total formal votes		28,485	98.3	
Informal votes		506	1.7	
Turnout		28,991	83.3	
Nationalist hold		Swing	+1.2	

=== Wimmera ===
1917 Australian federal election: Wimmera
Party	Candidate	Votes	%	±%
Nationalist	Sydney Sampson	unopposed		
Nationalist hold		Swing		

=== Yarra ===
1917 Australian federal election: Yarra
Party	Candidate	Votes	%	±%
Labor	Frank Tudor	22,358	71.3	−28.7
Nationalist	Charles Copeland	8,993	28.7	+28.7
Total formal votes		31,351	97.5	
Informal votes		805	2.5	
Turnout		32,156	84.1	
Labor hold		Swing	−28.7	

== Queensland ==
=== Brisbane ===
1917 Australian federal election: Brisbane
Party	Candidate	Votes	%	±%
Labor	William Finlayson	19,571	50.0	−10.3
Nationalist	Alfred Plane	19,556	50.0	+10.3
Total formal votes		39,127	97.8	
Informal votes		877	2.2	
Turnout		40,004	90.9	
Labor hold		Swing	−10.3	

=== Capricornia ===
1917 Australian federal election: Capricornia
Party	Candidate	Votes	%	±%
Labor	William Higgs	15,544	52.3	−15.1
Nationalist	Robert Duncan	14,153	47.7	+15.1
Total formal votes		29,697	97.9	
Informal votes		638	2.1	
Turnout		30,335	92.1	
Labor hold		Swing	−15.1	

=== Darling Downs ===
1917 Australian federal election: Darling Downs
Party	Candidate	Votes	%	±%
Nationalist	Littleton Groom	17,815	56.1	−0.8
Labor	John Wilson	13,937	43.9	+0.8
Total formal votes		31,752	98.3	
Informal votes		544	1.7	
Turnout		32,296	90.5	
Nationalist hold		Swing	−0.8	

=== Herbert ===
1917 Australian federal election: Herbert
Party	Candidate	Votes	%	±%
Nationalist	Fred Bamford	18,583	51.3	+15.7
Labor	Eugene McKenna	17,634	48.7	−15.7
Total formal votes		36,217	97.5	
Informal votes		921	2.5	
Turnout		37,138	90.0	
Nationalist gain from Labor		Swing	+15.7	

=== Kennedy ===
1917 Australian federal election: Kennedy
Party	Candidate	Votes	%	±%
Labor	Charles McDonald	15,346	62.8	−37.2
Nationalist	Hubert Sizer	9,076	37.2	+37.2
Total formal votes		24,422	97.3	
Informal votes		667	2.7	
Turnout		25,089	79.8	
Labor hold		Swing	−37.2	

=== Lilley ===
1917 Australian federal election: Lilley
Party	Candidate	Votes	%	±%
Nationalist	George Mackay	24,844	62.7	+10.4
Labor	Harald Jensen	14,751	37.3	−10.4
Total formal votes		39,595	98.2	
Informal votes		746	1.8	
Turnout		40,341	90.4	
Nationalist hold		Swing	+10.4	

=== Maranoa ===
1917 Australian federal election: Maranoa
Party	Candidate	Votes	%	±%
Labor	Jim Page	13,850	54.8	−45.2
Nationalist	Herbert Yeates	11,409	45.2	+45.2
Total formal votes		25,259	97.1	
Informal votes		753	2.9	
Turnout		26,012	84.4	
Labor hold		Swing	−45.2	

=== Moreton ===
1917 Australian federal election: Moreton
Party	Candidate	Votes	%	±%
Nationalist	Hugh Sinclair	16,292	50.1	−7.2
Labor	Cuthbert Butler	16,234	49.9	+7.2
Total formal votes		32,526	98.2	
Informal votes		601	1.8	
Turnout		33,127	87.2	
Nationalist hold		Swing	−7.2	

=== Oxley ===
1917 Australian federal election: Oxley
Party	Candidate	Votes	%	±%
Nationalist	James Bayley	21,603	52.8	+9.6
Labor	James Sharpe	19,331	47.2	−9.6
Total formal votes		40,934	98.3	
Informal votes		708	1.7	
Turnout		41,642	90.6	
Nationalist gain from Labor		Swing	+9.6	

=== Wide Bay ===
1917 Australian federal election: Wide Bay
Party	Candidate	Votes	%	±%
Nationalist	Edward Corser	15,991	52.9	+52.9
Labor	Frederick Martyn	14,250	47.1	−17.2
Total formal votes		30,241	98.3	
Informal votes		525	1.7	
Turnout		30,766	91.7	
Nationalist hold		Swing	+17.2	

== South Australia ==
=== Adelaide ===
1917 Australian federal election: Adelaide
Party	Candidate	Votes	%	±%
Labor	George Edwin Yates	unopposed		
Labor hold		Swing		

=== Angas ===
1917 Australian federal election: Angas
Party	Candidate	Votes	%	±%
Nationalist	Paddy Glynn	10,031	50.8	−49.2
Labor	Sid O'Flaherty	9,700	49.2	+49.2
Total formal votes		19,731	95.4	
Informal votes		955	4.6	
Turnout		20,686	69.6	
Nationalist hold		Swing	−49.2	

=== Barker ===
1917 Australian federal election: Barker
Party	Candidate	Votes	%	±%
Nationalist	John Livingston	16,869	63.9	+7.2
Labor	Stanley Whitford	9,522	36.1	−7.2
Total formal votes		26,391	96.6	
Informal votes		938	3.4	
Turnout		27,329	70.2	
Nationalist hold		Swing	+7.2	

=== Boothby ===
1917 Australian federal election: Boothby
Party	Candidate	Votes	%	±%
Nationalist	William Story	21,293	64.5	+19.8
Labor	John Gunn	11,700	35.5	−19.8
Total formal votes		32,993	96.9	
Informal votes		1,067	3.1	
Turnout		34,060	74.1	
Nationalist gain from Labor		Swing	+19.8	

=== Grey ===
1917 Australian federal election: Grey
Party	Candidate	Votes	%	±%
Nationalist	Alexander Poynton	13,495	57.7	+11.7
Labor	Thomas Lyons	9,909	42.3	−11.7
Total formal votes		23,404	96.5	
Informal votes		840	3.5	
Turnout		24,244	70.1	
Nationalist gain from Labor		Swing	+11.7	

=== Hindmarsh ===
1917 Australian federal election: Hindmarsh
Party	Candidate	Votes	%	±%
Nationalist	William Archibald	19,174	55.8	+30.2
Labor	James Cavanagh	15,177	44.2	−30.2
Total formal votes		34,351	96.5	
Informal votes		1,264	3.5	
Turnout		35,615	74.9	
Nationalist gain from Labor		Swing	+30.2	

=== Wakefield ===
1917 Australian federal election: Wakefield
Party	Candidate	Votes	%	±%
Nationalist	Richard Foster	13,706	56.2	+3.8
Labor	Norman Makin	10,663	43.8	−3.8
Total formal votes		24,369	96.6	
Informal votes		849	3.4	
Turnout		25,218	73.0	
Nationalist hold		Swing	+3.8	

== Western Australia ==
=== Dampier ===
1917 Australian federal election: Dampier
Party	Candidate	Votes	%	±%
Nationalist	Henry Gregory	15,310	71.4	+17.5
Labor	Michael Costello	6,144	28.6	−17.5
Total formal votes		21,454	95.6	
Informal votes		1,025	4.6	
Turnout		22,479	72.3	
Nationalist hold		Swing	+17.5	

=== Fremantle ===
1917 Australian federal election: Fremantle
Party	Candidate	Votes	%	±%
Nationalist	Reginald Burchell	21,773	68.9	+25.2
Labor	Jack Simons	9,849	31.1	−25.2
Total formal votes		31,622	96.8	
Informal votes		1,034	3.2	
Turnout		32,656	80.1	
Nationalist gain from Labor		Swing	+25.2	

=== Kalgoorlie ===
1917 Australian federal election: Kalgoorlie
Party	Candidate	Votes	%	±%
Nationalist	Edward Heitmann	11,659	51.3	+51.3
Labor	Hugh Mahon	11,087	48.7	−51.3
Total formal votes		22,746	97.3	
Informal votes		635	2.7	
Turnout		23,381	84.4	
Nationalist gain from Labor		Swing	+51.3	

=== Perth ===
1917 Australian federal election: Perth
Party	Candidate	Votes	%	±%
Nationalist	James Fowler	18,715	69.5	+13.7
Labor	Alexander Panton	8,221	30.5	−13.7
Total formal votes		26,936	95.8	
Informal votes		1,191	4.2	
Turnout		28,127	76.5	
Nationalist hold		Swing	+13.7	

=== Swan ===
1917 Australian federal election: Swan
Party	Candidate	Votes	%	±%
Nationalist	Sir John Forrest	unopposed		
Nationalist hold		Swing		

== Tasmania ==
=== Bass ===
1917 Australian federal election: Bass
Party	Candidate	Votes	%	±%
Nationalist	Jens Jensen	9,669	59.9	+15.9
Labor	James Mooney	6,466	40.1	−15.9
Total formal votes		16,135	97.1	
Informal votes		478	2.9	
Turnout		16,613	72.2	
Nationalist gain from Labor		Swing	+15.9	

=== Darwin ===
1917 Australian federal election: Darwin
Party	Candidate	Votes	%	±%
Nationalist	Charles Howroyd	9,073	58.8	+14.9
Labor	King O'Malley	6,361	41.2	−14.9
Total formal votes		15,434	97.5	
Informal votes		401	2.5	
Turnout		15,835	83.2	
Nationalist gain from Labor		Swing	+14.9	

=== Denison ===
1917 Australian federal election: Denison
Party	Candidate	Votes	%	±%
Nationalist	William Laird Smith	10,964	56.3	+12.2
Labor	Benjamin Watkins	8,507	43.7	−12.2
Total formal votes		19,471	97.1	
Informal votes		576	2.9	
Turnout		20,047	79.1	
Nationalist gain from Labor		Swing	+12.2	

=== Franklin ===
1917 Australian federal election: Franklin
Party	Candidate	Votes	%	±%
Nationalist	William McWilliams	unopposed		
Nationalist hold		Swing		

=== Wilmot ===
1917 Australian federal election: Wilmot
Party	Candidate	Votes	%	±%
Nationalist	Llewellyn Atkinson	7,874	61.5	+0.6
Labor	Christopher Sheedy	4,240	33.1	−6.0
Independent	Norman Cameron	590	4.6	+4.6
Independent	Louis Page	108	0.8	+0.8
Total formal votes		12,812	95.8	
Informal votes		566	4.2	
Turnout		13,378	71.5	
Nationalist hold		Swing	+3.3	

== See also ==
- Candidates of the 1917 Australian federal election
- Members of the Australian House of Representatives, 1917–1919
- 1917 Australian Senate election
