= 1917 Australian Senate election =

- 5 May 1917

18 of the 36 seats in the Senate 19 seats needed for a majority
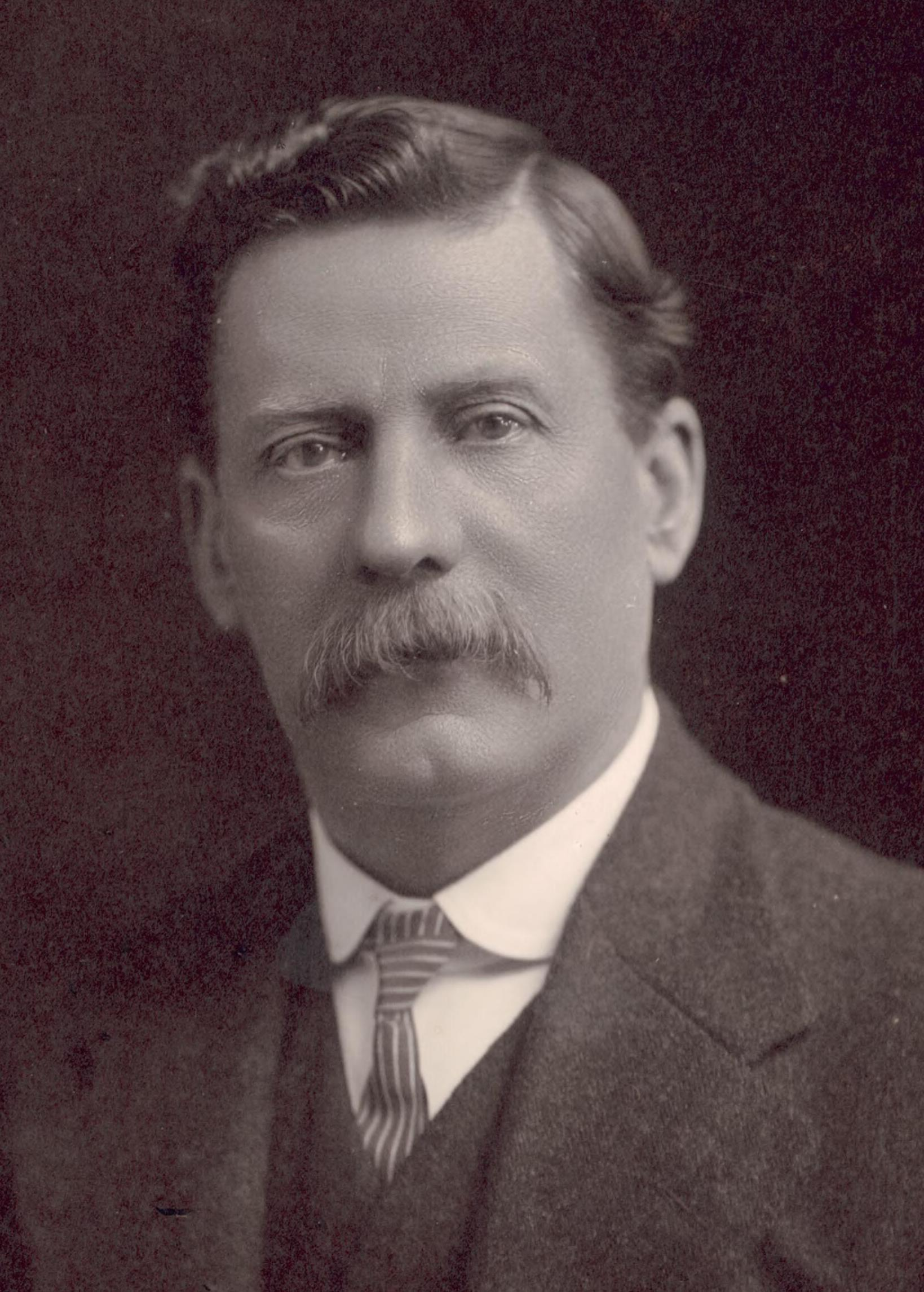

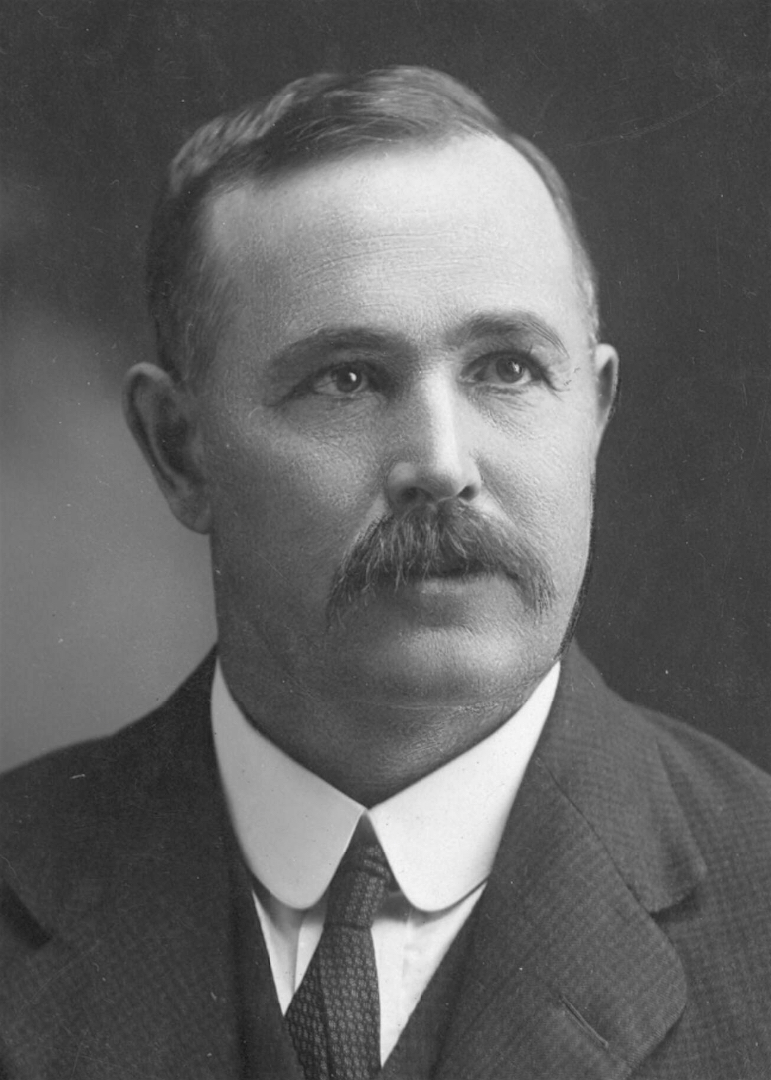
	First party	Second party
Leader	Edward Millen	Albert Gardiner
Party	Nationalist	Labor
Leader's seat	New South Wales	New South Wales
Seats before	6	30
Seats won	18	0
Seats after	24	12
Seat change	▲18	▼18
Popular vote	3,516,354	2,776,648
Percentage	55.37%	43.72
Swing	▲7.60	▼8.42

The 1917 Australian Senate election was held on 5 May 1917 to elect 18 of the 36 senators in the Australian Senate as part of the 1917 federal election. Each state elected three senators to serve a six-year term beginning on 1 July 1917.

The election was a landslide victory for the Nationalist Party, who won all 18 contested seats to gain control of the Senate.

== Australia ==
1917 Australian federal election: Senate, National
Party	Votes	%	±	Seats			
Party	Votes	%	±	Seats won	Not up	New total	Seat change
Nationalist	3,516,354	55.37	+7.60	18	6	24	▲18
Labor	2,776,648	43.72	−8.42	0	12	12	▼18
Socialist Labor	32,692	0.51	+0.51	0	0	0	Steady
Independents	24,676	0.39	+0.39	0	0	0	Steady
Total	6,350,370	100.00	–	18	18	36	–
Invalid/blank votes	86,011	3.90	−0.34	–	–	–	–
Turnout	2,202,801	77.69	+4.06	–	–	–	–
Registered voters	2,835,327	–	–	–	–	–	–

== New South Wales ==
Each elector voted for up to three candidates. Percentages refer to the number of voters rather than the number of votes.

1917 Australian federal election: Senate, New South Wales
Party	Candidate	Votes	%	±%
Nationalist	Edward Millen (re-elected 1)	413,774	55.61	
Nationalist	Herbert Pratten (elected 2)	407,547	54.78	
Nationalist	Josiah Thomas (elected 3)	406,892	54.69	
Labor	David Watson (defeated)	326,411	43.87	
Labor	Arthur Rae	322,991	43.41	
Labor	Peter Bowling	321,789	43.25	
Socialist Labor	James Moroney	12,184	1.64	
Socialist Labor	Ernie Judd	11,983	1.61	
Socialist Labor	Ludwig Klausen	8,525	1.15	
Total formal votes		2,232,096; 744,032 voters	96.17	+1.15
Informal votes		29,625	3.83	−1.15
Turnout		773,657	70.66	+5.81
Party total votes
Nationalist		1,228,213	55.03	+5.59
Labor		971,191	43.51	−7.05
Socialist Labor		32,692	1.46	+1.46

== Victoria ==
Each elector voted for up to three candidates. Percentages refer to the number of voters rather than the number of votes.

1917 Australian federal election: Senate, Victoria
Party	Candidate	Votes	%	±%
Nationalist	George Fairbairn (elected 1)	367,402	55.18	
Nationalist	William Bolton (elected 2)	364,846	54.79	
Nationalist	William Plain (elected 3)	363,798	54.63	
Labor	Albert Blakey (defeated)	301,286	45.25	
Labor	Andrew McKissock (defeated)	297,432	44.67	
Labor	Edward Findley (defeated)	295,087	44.32	
Independent	Vida Goldstein	7,768	1.17	
Total formal votes		1,997,619; 665,873 voters	96.79	+0.08
Informal votes		22,062	3.21	−0.08
Turnout		687,935	83.92	+4.77
Party total votes
Nationalist		1,096,046	54.87	+8.28
Labor		893,805	44.74	−8.67
Independent		7,768	0.39	+0.39

== Queensland ==
Each elector voted for up to three candidates. Percentages refer to the number of voters rather than the number of votes.

1917 Australian federal election: Senate, Queensland
Party	Candidate	Votes	%	±%
Nationalist	Thomas Crawford (elected 1)	163,741	51.05	
Nationalist	Matthew Reid (elected 2)	163,126	50.86	
Nationalist	Harry Foll (elected 3)	162,965	50.81	
Labor	James Stewart (defeated)	154,316	48.11	
Labor	Harry Turley (defeated)	153,894	47.98	
Labor	John Mullan (defeated)	153,337	47.81	
Independent	John Adamson	10,796	3.37	
Total formal votes		962,175; 320,725 voters	95.24	−0.53
Informal votes		16,026	4.76	+0.53
Turnout		336,751	89.02	+13.95
Party total votes
Nationalist		489,832	50.91	+8.28
Labor		461,547	47.97	−9.40
Independent		10,796	1.12	+1.12

== Western Australia ==
Each elector voted for up to three candidates. Percentages refer to the number of voters rather than the number of votes.

1917 Australian federal election: Senate, Western Australia
Party	Candidate	Votes	%	±%
Nationalist	Richard Buzacott (re-elected 1)	84,771	68.40	
Nationalist	George Henderson (re-elected 2)	84,549	68.22	
Nationalist	Hugh de Largie (re-elected 3)	84,104	67.86	
Labor	Cyril Bryan	40,822	32.94	
Labor	George Dennis	38,846	31.34	
Labor	John Lutey	38,704	31.23	
Total formal votes		371,796; 123,932 voters	94.84	+0.17
Informal votes		6,740	5.16	−0.17
Turnout		130,672	77.77	+6.31
Party total votes
Nationalist		253,424	68.16	+21.71
Labor		118,372	31.84	−21.71

== South Australia ==
Each elector voted for up to three candidates. Percentages refer to the number of voters rather than the number of votes.

1917 Australian federal election: Senate, South Australia
Party	Candidate	Votes	%	±%
Nationalist	Robert Guthrie (re-elected 1)	106,408	58.24	
Nationalist	William Senior (re-elected 2)	103,832	56.83	
Nationalist	James Rowell (elected 3)	102,700	56.21	
Labor	Thomas Butterfield	79,751	43.65	
Labor	Lionel Hill	79,036	43.26	
Labor	Frank Lundie	76,358	41.80	
Total formal votes		548,085; 182,695 voters	95.56	−0.60
Informal votes		8,483	4.44	+0.60
Turnout		191,178	71.93	−8.21
Party total votes
Nationalist		312,940	57.10	+3.73
Labor		235,145	42.90	−3.73

== Tasmania ==
Each elector voted for up to three candidates. Percentages refer to the number of voters rather than the number of votes.

1917 Australian federal election: Senate, Tasmania
Party	Candidate	Votes	%	±%
Nationalist	John Earle (re-elected 1)	46,332	58.26	
Nationalist	John Keating (re-elected 2)	45,595	57.33	
Nationalist	Thomas Bakhap (re-elected 3)	43,972	55.29	
Labor	James Hurst	32,855	41.31	
Labor	James Belton	32,470	40.83	
Labor	Walter Woods	31,263	39.31	
Independent	Cyril Cameron	4,783	6.01	
Independent	Henry Goodluck	1,329	1.67	
Total formal votes		238,599; 79,533 voters	96.28	+0.99
Informal votes		3,075	3.72	−0.99
Turnout		82,608	76.01	−1.51
Party total votes
Nationalist		135,899	56.96	+8.81
Labor		96,588	40.48	−9.28
Independent		6,112	2.56	+0.48

== See also ==
- Candidates of the 1917 Australian federal election
- Results of the 1917 Australian federal election (House of Representatives)
- Members of the Australian Senate, 1917–1920
