= Electoral results for the Division of Barrier =

Australian division election results

This is a list of electoral results for the Division of Barrier of New South Wales in Australian federal elections from the division's creation in 1901 until its abolition in 1922.

== Members ==
Member	Party	Term
Josiah Thomas	Labor	1901–1916
Josiah Thomas	Nationalist	1916—1917
Michael Considine	Labor	1917–1919
Michael Considine	Independent	1919–1920
Michael Considine	Industrial Socialist Labor	1920–1922

== Election results ==
=== Elections in the 1910s ===
==== 1919 ====
1919 Australian federal election: Barrier
Party	Candidate	Votes	%	±%
Labor	Michael Considine	8,786	51.7	+1.8
Returned Soldiers	Arthur Lawrence	4,735	27.9	+27.9
Nationalist	Charles McAllister	3,476	20.5	+15.3
Total formal votes		16,997	96.4	
Informal votes		637	3.6	
Turnout		17,634	65.7	
Two-party-preferred result
Labor	Michael Considine		53.8	+53.8
Returned Soldiers	Arthur Lawrence		46.2	+46.2
Labor hold		Swing	+53.8	

==== 1917 ====
1917 Australian federal election: Barrier
Party	Candidate	Votes	%	±%
Labor	Michael Considine	9,710	49.9	−29.8
Ind. Nationalist	William Montgomery	8,734	44.9	+44.9
Nationalist	Brian Doe	1,004	5.2	−15.1
Total formal votes		19,448	97.5	
Informal votes		502	2.5	
Turnout		19,950	60.3	
Labor hold		Swing	−27.2	

==== 1914 ====
1914 Australian federal election: Barrier
Party	Candidate	Votes	%	±%
Labor	Josiah Thomas	16,063	79.7	+2.9
Liberal	William Ferguson	4,094	20.3	−2.9
Total formal votes		20,157	97.6	
Informal votes		498	2.4	
Turnout		20,655	56.3	
Labor hold		Swing	+2.9	

==== 1913 ====
1913 Australian federal election: Barrier
Party	Candidate	Votes	%	±%
Labor	Josiah Thomas	15,047	76.8	+7.6
Liberal	Arthur Harrison	4,537	23.2	−7.6
Total formal votes		19,584	96.3	
Informal votes		750	3.7	
Turnout		20,334	62.2	
Labor hold		Swing	+7.6	

==== 1910 ====
1910 Australian federal election: Barrier
Party	Candidate	Votes	%	±%
Labour	Josiah Thomas	9,447	85.8	+11.3
Liberal	William Shepherd	1,562	14.2	−11.3
Total formal votes		11,009	98.5	
Informal votes		166	1.5	
Turnout		11,175	52.9	
Labour hold		Swing	+11.3	

=== Elections in the 1900s ===
==== 1906 ====
1906 Australian federal election: Barrier
Party	Candidate	Votes	%	±%
Labour	Josiah Thomas	5,602	74.5	−7.5
Anti-Socialist	George Marshall	1,919	25.5	+25.5
Total formal votes		7,521	95.8	
Informal votes		311	4.2	
Turnout		7,832	31.1	
Labour hold		Swing	−7.5	

==== 1903 ====
1903 Australian federal election: Barrier
Party	Candidate	Votes	%	±%
Labour	Josiah Thomas	6,217	82.0	−5.4
Ind. Protectionist	John Dunstan	1,367	18.0	+18.0
Total formal votes		7,584	97.7	
Informal votes		175	2.3	
Turnout		7,759	40.3	
Labour hold		Swing	−5.4	

==== 1901 ====
1901 Australian federal election: Barrier
Party	Candidate	Votes	%	±%
Labour	Josiah Thomas	4,649	87.4	+87.4
Independent	Benjamin Long	670	12.6	+12.6
Total formal votes		5,319	96.8	
Informal votes		174	3.2	
Turnout		5,493	53.4	
Labour win		(new seat)		
