= The People: Official Organ of the Australian Socialist League =

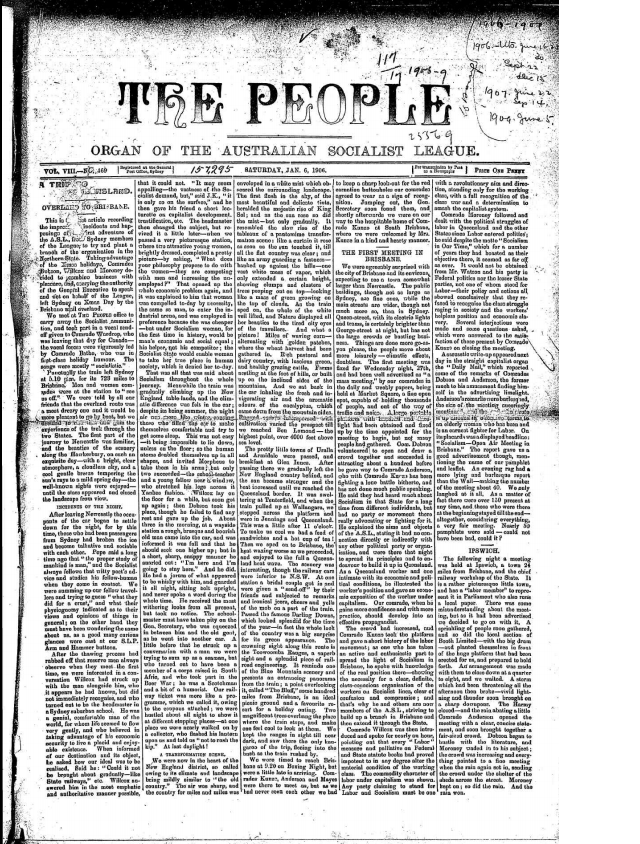
- The People: Official Organ of the Australian Socialist League, 6 January 1906
- Founded: 1898
- Ceased publication: 1971
- Political alignment: Far-left; Official newspaper of the Socialist Labor Party
- Headquarters: Sydney, New South Wales, Australia

The People: Official Organ of the Australian Socialist League, also known as The People and the Collectivist, was a weekly English language newspaper published in Sydney, New South Wales, Australia.

== History ==
In 1898 the Australian Socialist League began publishing The People and the Collectivist. The paper was formed by the union of Northern People and the Collectivist. On 29 December 1900 the title changed to The People: Official Organ of the Australian Socialist League. The title changed in 1919 to The Revolutionary Socialist, published by the Socialist Labor Party. It absorbed the Victorian publication One Big Union Herald and ceased around 1971.

== Digitisation ==
The various versions of the paper have been digitised as part of the Australian Newspapers Digitisation Program project hosted by the National Library of Australia. Digitised copies can be accessed by members of the public through Trove.

== See also ==
- List of newspapers in New South Wales
- List of newspapers in Australia

== Bibliography ==
- Looking good : the changing appearance of Australian newspapers / by Victor Isaacs, for the Australian Newspapers History Group, Middle Park, Qld. : Australian Newspaper History Group, 2007.
- Press timeline : Select chronology of significant Australian press events to 2011 / Compiled by Rod Kirkpatrick for the Australian Newspaper History Group
- Australian Newspaper History : A Bibliography / Compiled by Victor Isaacs, Rod Kirkpatrick and John Russell, Middle Park, Qld. : Australian Newspaper History Group, 2004.
- Newspapers in Australian libraries : a union list. 4th ed.
