= William Williams (New South Wales politician) =

Australian politician (1856–1947)

William John Williams (1856–1947) was an English-born Australian politician.

He was born in Gwennap in Cornwall and was brought up in Wales where he was a house painter. He arrived in New South Wales around 1890 and settled in Broken Hill, where he worked on mining machinery, before conducting an auctioneering and agency business. He was a prominent member of the labor movement, holding various offices including president, vice-president and auditor of the Amalgamated Miners' Association, and president and secretary of the Alma branch of the Political Labour League. He was an alderman in the Broken Hill council from 1899 until 1900.

There was a bitter contest to be the Labour candidate for the district of Alma in the New South Wales Legislative Assembly at the 1901 election. Jabez Wright, the Mayor of Broken Hill, had a history of using unscrupulous means and was frequently in conflict with Williams, who had alleged that Wright had breached the rules of the Political Labour League and was prevented from being its candidate. Wright was selected as the candidate and Williams, despite signing a pledge not to oppose the selected candidate, stood as an Independent Labour candidate. Williams went on to win the election by 91 votes.

Alma was abolished in the 1904 re-distribution of electorates following the 1903 New South Wales referendum, which required the number of members of the Legislative Assembly to be reduced from 125 to 90 and was split between Broken Hill and Sturt. Williams chose to contest Sturt but was easily defeated by the Labour candidate Arthur Griffith. He did not stand as a candidate at any further elections for the Legislative Assembly.

He died in Broken Hill in 1947.

New South Wales Legislative Assembly
Preceded by Josiah Thomas	Member for Alma; 1901–1904	District abolished
