= Peter Bowling =

Australian trade unionist

Peter Bowling (19 December 1864 – 22 February 1942) was an Australian coal miner and trade unionist.

Bowling was born in Stirling, Scotland to miner Patrick Bowling and Marguerite MacGuire. They lived in mining housing in Dunfirmline, Fife. He started working in the mines at the age of twelve and migrated to New South Wales on board the Duke Of Westminster, arriving in Australia when he was 19. He worked around Newcastle. He married Mary Ann Madden at Branxton on 5 September 1889. He worked in Gippsland in the 1890s, where he was involved in founding a miners' union, but returned to New South Wales and in 1893 was elected as an official of the Back Creek miners' lodge. He joined the Australian Socialist League in 1897 and was influenced by the Industrial Workers of the World, supporting direct action and strong unions. Appointed treasurer of the Colliery Employees' Federation, a northern union, in 1904 and president in 1906–10, he was influential in uniting the northern, western and southern unions as the Australian Coal and Shale Employees' Federation in 1908.

Bowling was a militant socialist and supported confrontation against the mine owners, calling for a general strike which eventuated in November 1909. Supporting radical action against the calls for moderation from his fellow mining representative Billy Hughes, Bowling was arrested for conspiracy in Newcastle on 4 December and later physically attacked Hughes while out on bail. In January 1910 Bowling, Daniel Hutton, James Butler and William O'Connor were charged in relation to taking part in a later strike meeting at Bulli on 29 December. Bowling represented himself, while the others were represented by Each were convicted and Judge Rogers sentenced each to imprisonment, Bowling for 12 months and the others 8 months. In February 1910 5 leaders of 2 unions were indicted on 3 conspiracy charges to instigate the coal miners strike in November and December 1909. From the Northern Miners' Federation were Bowling, president, William Brennan, secretary, Amram Lewis, treasurer and from the Amalgamated Coal and Shale Workers Association, Andrew Gray secretary and Albert Burns, treasurer. Bowling, Brennan Burns and Lewis were represented by Mr Gannon and Mr Watt while Gray was represented by Andrew Lysaght. The prosecutors were Ernest Lamb and Thomas Bavin. The jury convicted all 5 and Justice Robert Pring sentenced each of them to imprisonment for 18 months. For Bowling this was to be in addition to the 12 months imposed by Judge Rogers, making a total of two and a half years' imprisonment.

The strike ended in defeat in March 1910. Despite this apparent failure, Bowling was used in the Labor campaign for the 1910 state election, appearing on posters in leg-irons; Labor won government for the first time in New South Wales in that election. After his release Bowling visited New Zealand, during which time he lost his union presidency; he subsequently worked in a colliery in Balmain and the abattoir at Homebush. Initially an anti-conscriptionist, he switched to the conscriptionist camp in 1917 after four of his sons enlisted. Robert served in France in the Medical Corp.

After the War, one of his sons jointed the NSW Police Force. Realising through his son that the police had no formed union structure, Bowling was instrumental in the establishment and development of the NSW Police Union.

In later years, he and Billy Hughes became close friends, particularly after Hughes' daughter first attempted to commit suicide by trying jumping off a ship steaming out of Perth on the way to the UK. After reaching London and giving birth to a son, she ultimately did suicide. As a single young woman, she was depressed by her pregnancy and feared family shame.

During the 1920s Bowling worked on the Sydney wharves before retiring. He died of cerebral arteriosclerosis in 1942 at Sacred Heart Hospice in Darlinghurst.
