= Joe Clark (Australian politician) =

Australian politician

Joe Clark CBE
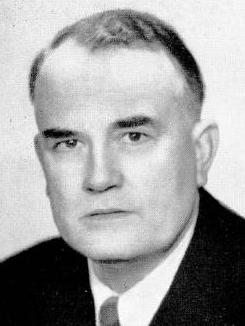

Father of the House
- In office 31 July 1963 – 29 September 1969
- Preceded by: Eddie Ward
- Succeeded by: John McEwen

Member of the Australian Parliament for Darling
- In office 15 September 1934 – 29 September 1969
- Preceded by: Arthur Blakeley
- Succeeded by: John FitzPatrick

Personal details
- Born: 29 July 1897 Coonamble, New South Wales
- Died: 9 December 1992 (aged 95)
- Party: Lang Labor (1934–36); Labor (1936–69)
- Occupation: Tailor

Joseph James Clark, CBE (29 July 1897 – 9 December 1992) was an Australian politician. He was a member of the Australian Labor Party (ALP) and served in the House of Representatives from 1934 to 1969, representing the New South Wales seat of Darling. He is one of the longest-serving members in parliamentary history. He was a backbencher through his period of service, although he did serve as chairman of committees from 1946 to 1949.

== Early life ==
Clark was born on 29 July 1897 in Coonamble, New South Wales. He was the eldest of four children born to Elizabeth Ellen (née Finlay) and Joseph Alfred Clark. His father was a tailor by profession.

Clark was educated at St Brigid's Convent School and Coonamble Public School before completing his education as a boarder at Holy Cross College, Ryde. He returned to Coonamble in 1915 and began an apprenticeship with his father, but also studied engineering by correspondence and was articled to a surveyor. In 1920, his father was elected to state parliament, with Clark taking over the family business. At its peak it employed over 30 people and had shops in Coonamble, Baradine, Dubbo, and Walgett. However, during the Great Depression most staff were laid off and all except the Coonamble shop were closed.

== Politics ==
Clark joined the ALP at the age of 16. He served on the Coonamble Municipal Council from 1925 to 1934, including as mayor for three years. He was associated with the Lang Labor faction and unsuccessfully sought preselection for the seat of Darling prior to the 1931 federal election.

Clark was elected to the House of Representatives at the 1934 election, defeating the incumbent ALP MP Arthur Blakeley.

Clark sat on a number of industry committees and bodies, including the Australian Meat Industry Commission from 1942 to 1943, the Federal Meat Advisory Committee from 1943 to 1946, and in 1946 he led a delegation to the Iron and Steel Committee. He served as chairman of committees from 1946 to 1949.

In 1970 he was appointed a CBE. He was the last surviving MP who served during the Prime Ministerships of Joseph Lyons, Earle Page, the first tenure of Robert Menzies and Arthur Fadden.

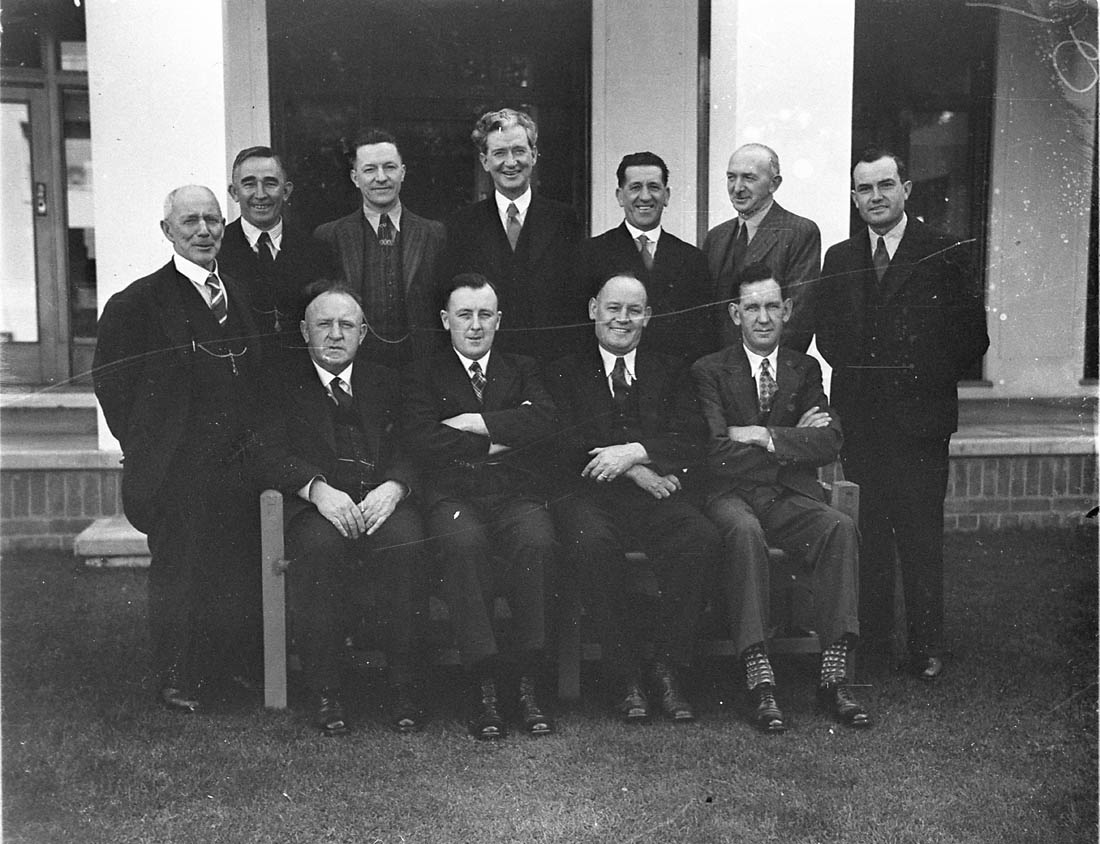
Lang Labor members of the 14th Parliament, Old Parliament House, Canberra, 1935. Joe Clark is standing at right.

== Personal life ==
Clark married Mary Elizabeth Regan in 1927, with whom he had two sons and two daughters. He was widowed in 1962 and the following year married Melbourne Mary "Mollie" Regan, his brother-in-law's ex-wife. He was widowed again in 1985 and died on 9 December 1992 at Bondi, New South Wales, aged 95.

Parliament of Australia
Preceded by Arthur Blakeley	Member for Darling; 1934–1969	Succeeded by John FitzPatrick
