= John FitzPatrick (Australian federal politician) =

Australian politician

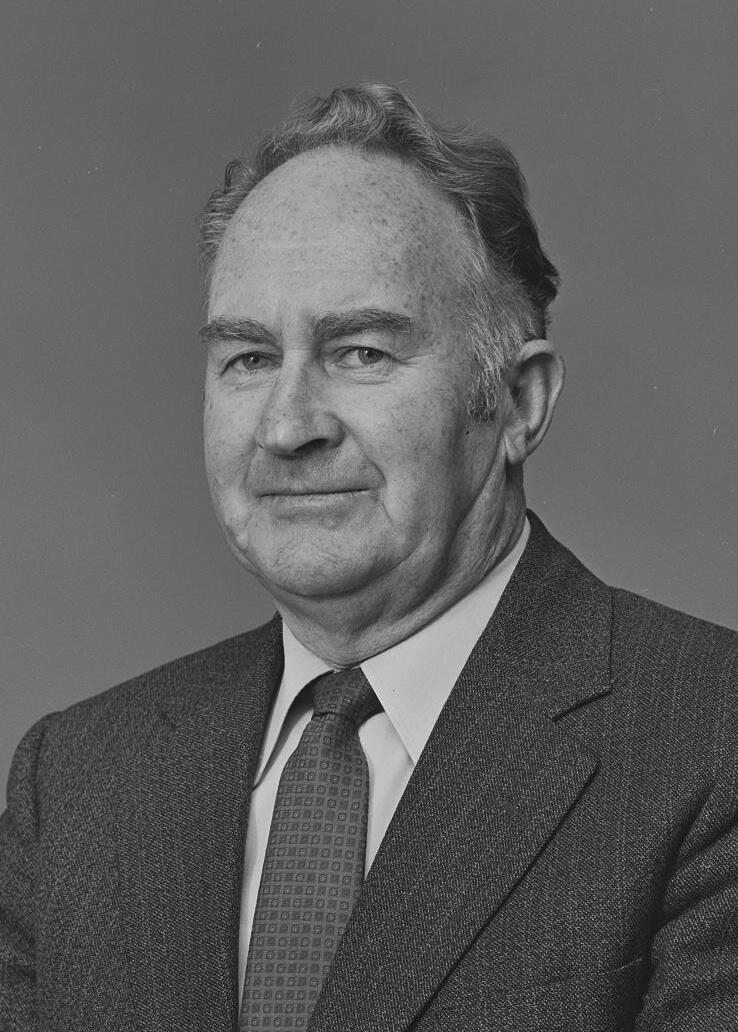
- FitzPatrick in 1973

Member of the Australian Parliament for Darling
- In office 25 October 1969 – 10 December 1977
- Preceded by: Joe Clark
- Succeeded by: Seat abolished

Member of the Australian Parliament for Riverina
- In office 10 December 1977 – 19 September 1980
- Preceded by: John Sullivan
- Succeeded by: Noel Hicks

Personal details
- Born: 24 April 1915 Broken Hill, New South Wales
- Died: 28 July 1997 (aged 82)
- Party: Australian Labor Party
- Occupation: Boilermaker

John FitzPatrick (24 April 1915 – 28 July 1997) was an Australian politician.

FitzPatrick was born and lived all of his life in Broken Hill, New South Wales and was a boilermaker before running for Parliament. He was elected for the Australian Labor Party as the federal member for Darling in rural New South Wales from 1969 to 1977 and as the member for Riverina from 1977 to 1980.

FitzPatrick served his first four terms as the member for Darling, based on Broken Hill. It had been one of the few country seats where Labor consistently did well; indeed, it had been in Labor hands for all but a few months since Federation. As a measure of how safe this seat was, he retained it in 1975 with a majority of seven percent even amid Labor's collapse that year.

Ahead of the 1977 federal election, Darling was abolished, and FitzPatrick opted to follow most of his constituents into neighbouring Riverina. That seat had previously been a safe National Country seat, but the addition of the heavily pro-Labor territory from Darling gave Labor a notional majority. FitzPatrick challenged the National Country incumbent, John Sullivan, and won narrowly even as the Coalition was easily reelected. However, facing the prospect of a challenge from the popular mayor of Broken Hill City Council, Noel Hicks, FitzPatrick did not run for reelection in 1980.

== Notes ==
Parliament of Australia
Preceded by Joe Clark	Member for Darling; 1969–1977	Division abolished
Preceded by John Sullivan	Member for Riverina; 1977–1980	Succeeded by Noel Hicks
