= Electoral district of Alma =

Electoral district of New South Wales (1894–1904)

Alma New South Wales—Legislative Assembly
- State: New South Wales
- Created: 1894
- Abolished: 1904
- Namesake: Alma

Alma was an electoral district of the Legislative Assembly in the Australian state of New South Wales from 1894 to 1904, named after Alma, a locality in southern Broken Hill.

== Members for Alma ==
Josiah Thomas easily won the seat for Labor at the 1894 election, was elected unopposed following year and increased his majority at the 1898 election. Thomas entered federal politics by the winning the seat of Barrier at the first Commonwealth election. William Williams succeeded Thomas after narrowing defeating Jabez Wright in the 1901 election.

Member	Party	Term
Josiah Thomas	Labor	1894–1901
William Williams	Independent Labor	1901–1904

== See also ==
1901 New South Wales state election: Alma
Party	Candidate	Votes	%	±%
Independent Labour	William Williams	874	52.0	
Labour	Jabez Wright	783	46.6	−42.0
Independent	William Colliss	25	1.5	+1.5
Total formal votes		1,682	100	+2.8
Informal votes		0	0	−2.8
Turnout		1,682	64.2	+18.8
Independent Labour gain from Labour				

The sitting member was Josiah Thomas (Labour) who did not contest the election as he had been elected in March 1901 to the federal seat of Barrier which included Broken Hill. William Williams nominated as an Independent Labor candidate after friction between local branches and the Barrier District Assembly.
