= Michael Considine =

Irish-born Australian politician and unionist

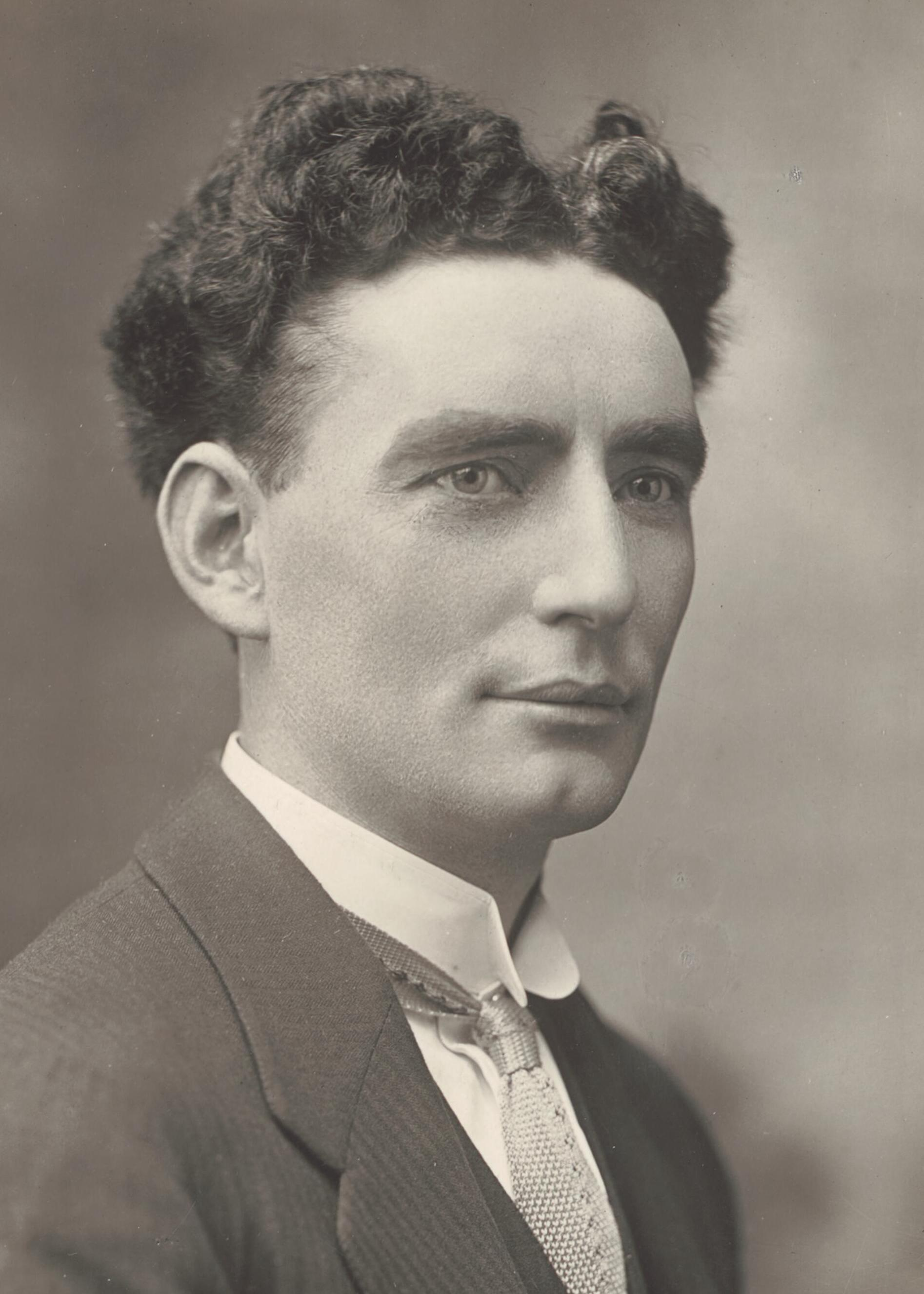

Member of the Australian Parliament for Barrier
- In office 5 May 1917 – 16 December 1922
- Preceded by: Josiah Thomas
- Succeeded by: Seat abolished

Personal details
- Born: c. 26 January 1885 County Mayo, Ireland
- Died: 2 November 1959 (aged 74)
- Party: Labor (1917–20) (1926+); Socialist Labor (1920–21); Industrial Labor Party (1921-)
- Spouse: Bessie Washington
- Occupation: Unionist

Michael Patrick Considine (c. 26 January 1885 – 2 November 1959) was an Irish-born Australian politician and unionist. He represented the seat of Barrier in the House of Representatives from 1917 to 1922. A controversial figure, Considine was pressured to resign from the Australian Labor Party (ALP). He won in 1919 as an independent before joining the Socialist Labor Party in 1920, but his seat was abolished for the 1922 election and he was defeated in an attempt to transfer to the seat of Darling.

== Early life ==
Considine was born in County Mayo, Ireland, the son of Michael Patrick Considine and Margaret Josephine, née Lowney. He and his mother came to New South Wales in 1890, living first at Kempsey and then at Sydney. He was prominent in the 1908 tramway worker strike, and was a member of the Socialist Federation of Australia, resigning in 1909 after the Broken Hill strike of 1909. In 1910, he was sentenced to six months in gaol after demonstrating against Charles Wade's government and the gaoling of Peter Bowling. After his release, Considine moved to Broken Hill in 1911.

During World War I, Considine was president of the militant Amalgamated Miners' Association and was a member of the Marxist Australian Socialist Party, but he resigned from the latter due to his support for unions. At Eaglehawk, Victoria on 23 January 1918 he married Bessie Washington.

== Politics ==
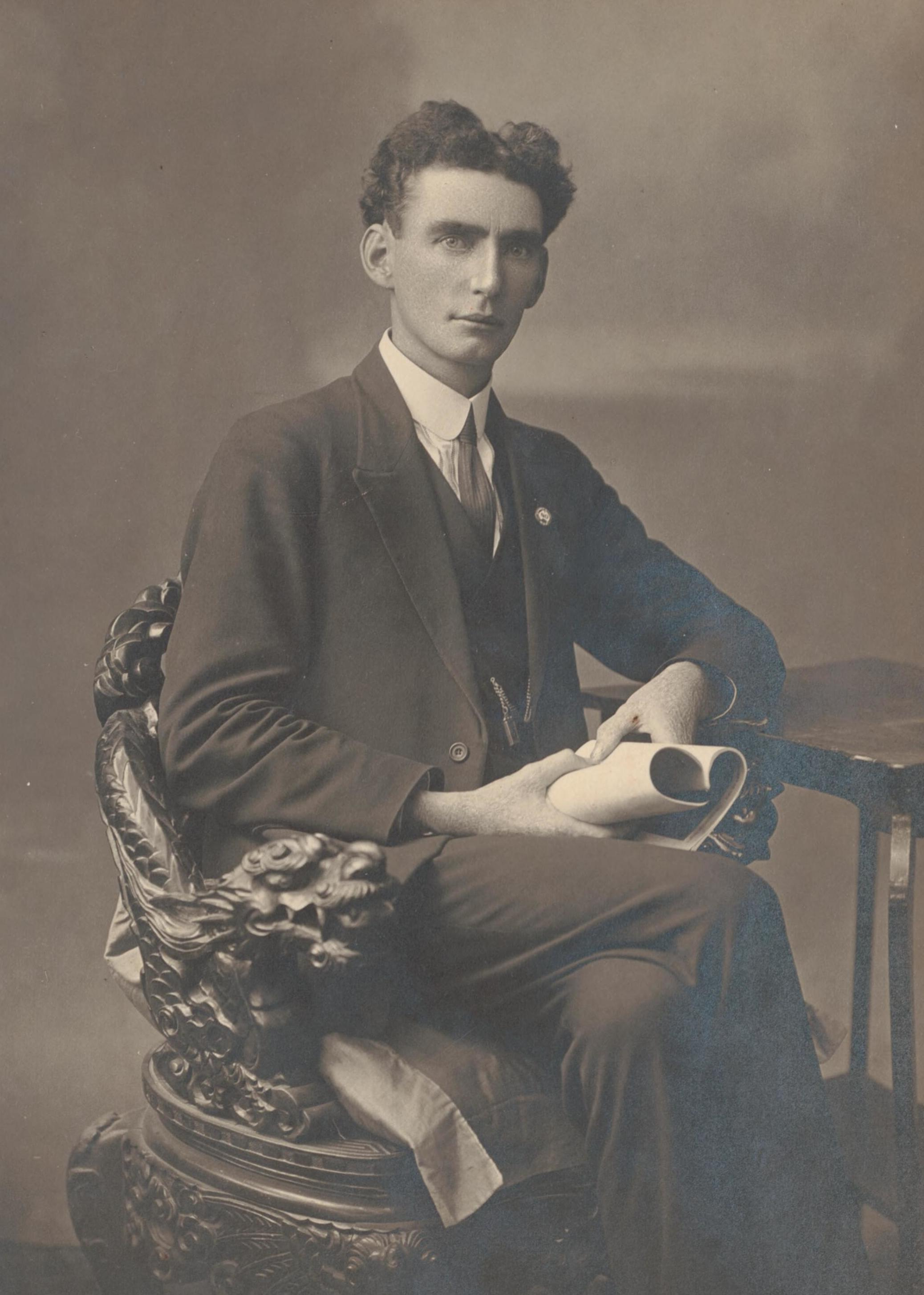
Undated photo

In 1917, Considine was elected to the House of Representatives seat of Barrier for the Labor Party. He immediately established himself as a spokesman of the far left wing of the party, even acting as consul for the Bolshevik government of Russia. He was again gaoled for three weeks in 1919 after publicly declaring, "Bugger the King, he is a bloody German bastard." He also attracted suspension from the House for asserting that the government was supporting the Kolchak forces in Russia.

Following the 1919 split in the New South Wales Labor Party, Considine was placed under considerable pressure and resigned from the party in 1920. He contested the 1922 election as an Industrial Labor Party candidate in the seat of Darling and received 22.2 percent of the vote, but was unsuccessful. In 1926 he rejoined the Labor Party, but was unsuccessful in an attempt for endorsement for Darling.

== Later life ==
Considine moved to Melbourne in 1927 and held various occupations. He remained prominent in the union movement and continued to rebel at the 1930s–40s Labor conferences. He died suddenly on 2 November 1959 and was survived by his wife, a son, and two daughters.

Parliament of Australia
Preceded by Josiah Thomas	Member for Barrier; 1917–1922	Division abolished
