= Socialist Labor Party (Australia) =

Former New South Wales political party

- Founded: 4 May 1887; 139 years ago, (as Australian Socialist League)
- Dissolved: c. 1940
- Headquarters: 107 Liverpool Street, Sydney, New South Wales
- Newspaper: The People
- Membership (1893): ▲ <9,000
- Ideology: Marxism–De Leonism; Syndicalism
- Political position: Far-left

The Socialist Labor Party was a socialist political party of Australia that existed from 1901 to the 1970s. Originally formed as the Australian Socialist League in 1887, it had members such as George Black, New South Wales Premier William Holman and Prime Minister Billy Hughes.

== History ==
=== Australian Socialist League ===
The Australian Socialist League, a multi-tendency organisation similar to the British Socialist League, was founded on 4 May 1887, and publicly launched several months later on 26 August at 533 George Street, Sydney, New South Wales Colony. The Socialist League was largest within the state of New South Wales. The League consisted of three major groups, the "Modern Socialists", the "Scientific socialists or Communist-Anarchists", and the "libertarian and individualist anarchists" Labor historian Verity Burgmann describes the Modern Socialists as a unique historical tendency that "espoused a co-operativist strategy: it was a kind of micro-socialism in that it aimed to build socialist society in bits and pieces, by the voluntary establishment of worker-owned enterprises that would eventually form a socialist whole". Between the late 1890s and 1905, the League shifted towards the radical unionist ideas of De Leonism. The Socialist League and their ideas were influential within the 1890 Maritime strike and the 1891 Australian shearers' strike.

In March 1888 the party sought to establish a Labor Party within New South Wales with the policies of the "nationalization of land and resumption of all monopolies". The League supported the Trades & Labor Council's decision in 1891 to establish the Labor Electoral League of New South Wales, and actively campaigned and ran candidates within the party due to a belief the party would eventually establish the League's policies of state socialism. During the 1891 New South Wales election, in some regions nearly half of all the Labor candidates were League members. At its peak the League had several members elected within the Trades & Labor Council, and several elected members of parliament. The League's list of parliamentarians included Billy Hughes, William Holman, George Black, and Arthur Hill Griffith.

By the mid-1890s, the League became dissatisfied with the ability of the Labor Party in achieving its goals of socialism. The League established a newspaper in 1894 named The Socialist in an attempt to promote socialist ideas. In 1898 the League split from the Labor Party, leaving behind its affiliated Labor parliamentarians, and sought to establish their own Labor Party.

=== Socialist Labor Party ===
The party was founded by the Australian Socialist League in 1901 to contest the Australian federal election of 1901. The party nominated six candidates (known as the "Socialist Six") for the Senate seats of New South Wales: Andrew Thomson, James Moroney, Harry Holland, James Morrish, John Neil, and Thomas Melling. None of the candidates came close to winning a seat.

The Socialist Labor Party is credited with introducing the Industrial Workers of the World to Australia and establishing its first branch in 1908.

In January 1920, the party merged with the Industrial Socialist Labor Party, which had broken away from the Labor Party in 1919, retaining the name Socialist Labor Party. The amalgamated Socialist Labor party ran in the 1920 New South Wales state election, with one of the members Percy Brookfield winning the seat of Sturt as a Socialist candidate. Brookfield had the balance of power in the assembly following the election but was murdered the following year. Several months before his death, in February 1921, Percy and several other members split from the Socialist Labor Party and reformed the independent Industrial Labor Party, citing they were "dissatisfied with the manner in which the affairs of that party have been carried on". Michael Considine, Labor member for Barrier in the federal House of Representatives from 1917, joined the Socialist Labor Party in 1920 after his expulsion from the ALP, and unsuccessfully contested the seat of Darling for the party in 1922 as an Industrial Labor candidate.

Support for the party rapidly diminished after the ALP adopted its socialist objective in 1921, with many members returning to the ALP and others joining the newly founded Communist Party of Australia founded in the same year. Unlike many other socialist organisations, the Socialist Labor Party rejected the unity conferences which led to the Communist Party, labelling it as "a front for capitalist spies". The party survived into the 1940s, under the leadership of E.E. Judd.

The party was re-established at a significantly smaller size in 1961, and maintained writing its newspaper The People until the 1970s.

== Electoral results ==
Senate results
Year	Overall votes	Vote %	Seats won	±
1901	27,347 (Note: The party only contested one state: New South Wales.)	1.02	0 / 36	+1.02
1903	69,769	2.43	0 / 36	+1.41
1913	20,183	1.05	0 / 36	–1.38
1917	32,692	0.51	0 / 36	–0.54
1919	10,508	0.57	0 / 36	+0.06
1922	8,551	0.55	0 / 36	–0.02

== See also ==
- Socialism in Australia
