= Arthur Blakeley =

Australian politician (1886–1972)

The Honourable Arthur Blakeley
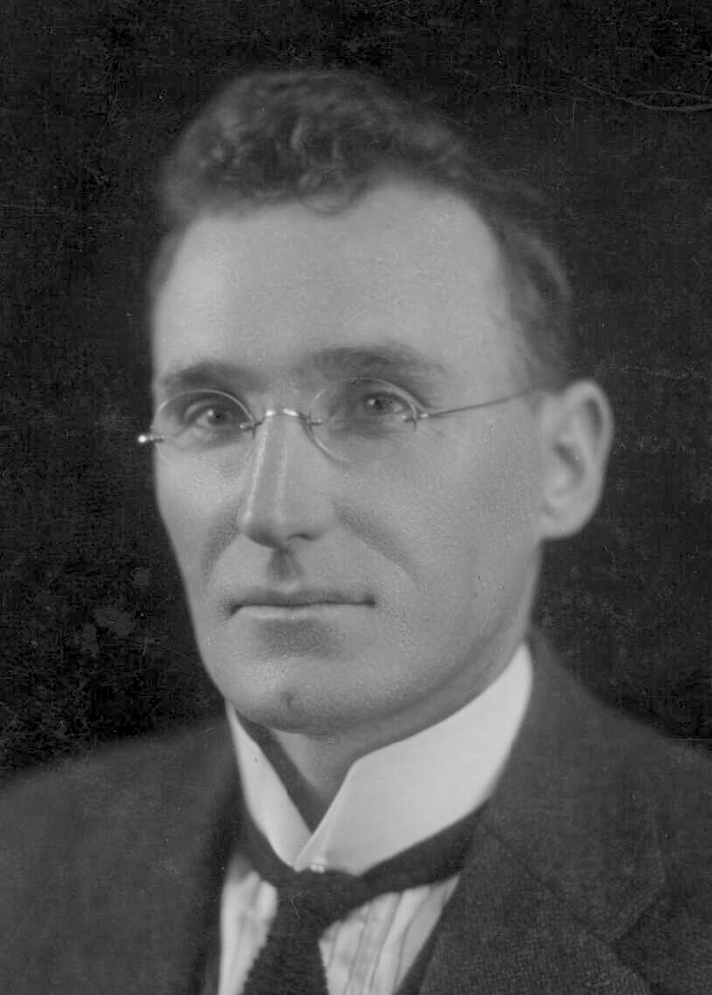

Minister for Home Affairs
- In office 22 October 1929 – 6 January 1932
- Prime Minister: James Scullin
- Preceded by: Aubrey Abbott
- Succeeded by: Archdale Parkhill

Deputy Leader of the Opposition Deputy Leader of the Labor Party
- In office 26 April 1928 – 5 February 1929
- Leader: James Scullin
- Preceded by: James Scullin
- Succeeded by: Ted Theodore

Member of the Australian Parliament for Darling
- In office 5 May 1917 – 15 September 1934
- Preceded by: William Spence
- Succeeded by: Joe Clark

Personal details
- Born: 3 July 1886 Gilberton, South Australia, Australia
- Died: 27 June 1972 (aged 85) Glen Iris, Victoria, Australia
- Party: Labor
- Spouse: Ruby Pauline McCarroll (m. 1914; died 1962)
- Children: 4
- Occupation: Unionist

Arthur Blakeley (3 July 1886 – 27 June 1972) was an Australian politician who served in the House of Representatives from 1917 to 1934, representing the Labor Party. He was the party's deputy leader from 1928 to 1929 and served as Minister for Home Affairs in the Scullin government (1929–1932).

== Early life ==
Blakeley was born on 3 July 1886 in Gilberton, South Australia. He was the son of Catherine Ann (née Greenwood) and Simeon Blakeley, his father being a house-painter from Yorkshire, England. When he was young, the family moved to Broken Hill, New South Wales, where he attended a convent school. Blakeley was educated to the age of 13, when he left school to work in the mining camps. He later worked as a shearer. In 1912, he became an organiser for the Australian Workers' Union (AWU). He served as secretary of its western branch from 1915 to 1917, based in Bourke, New South Wales. Blakeley married Ruby Pauline McCarroll in 1914, with whom he had two sons and two daughters.

== Political career ==
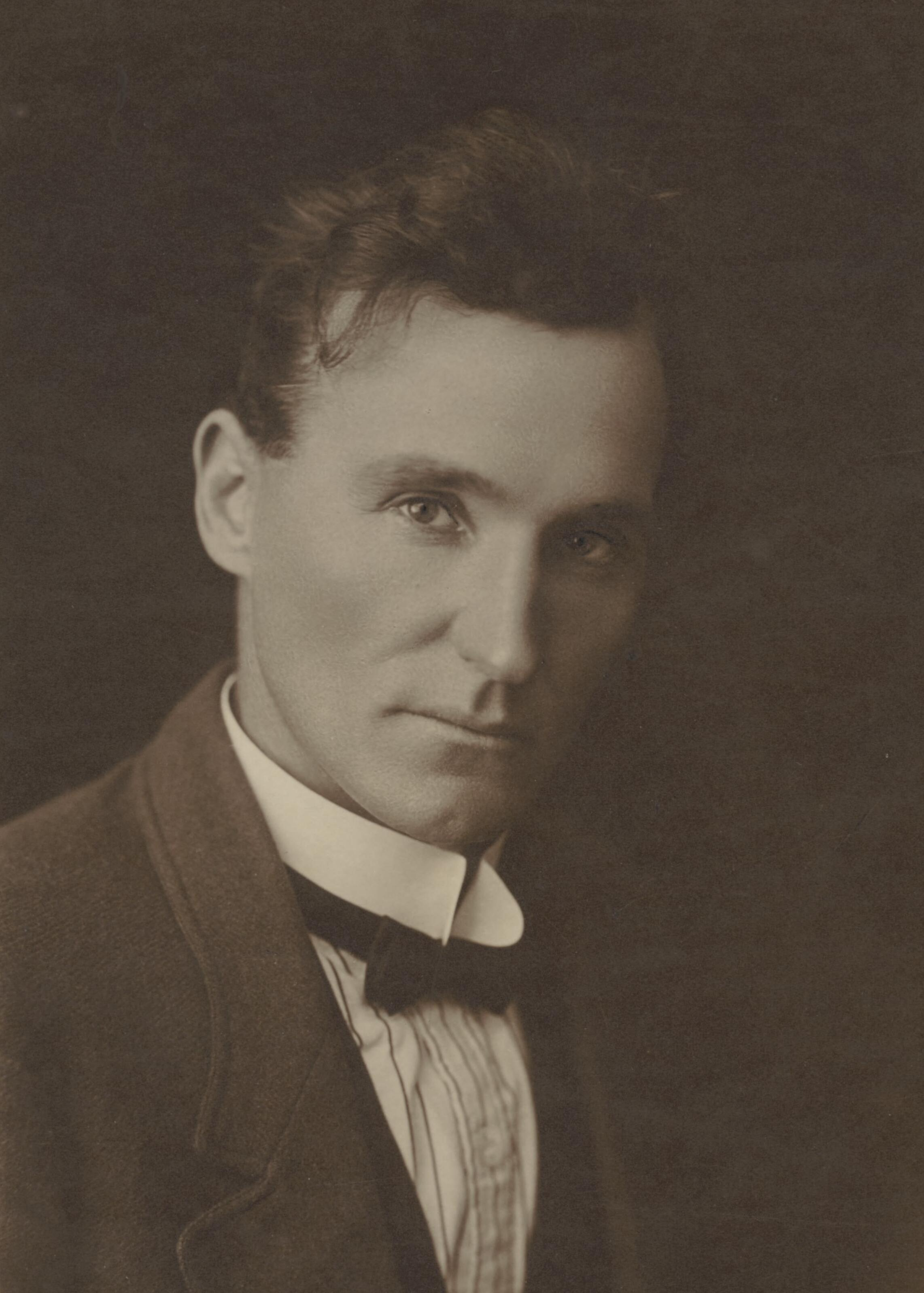
Blakeley in 1917

In the 1917 election, Blakeley was elected as the member for Darling in the Australian House of Representatives after a sustained campaign against conscription. He was president of the Australian Workers' Union from 1919 to 1923. In April 1928, he was elected deputy leader of the parliamentary party, but lost it in 1929 to Ted Theodore. On the election of the Scullin government, Blakeley became Minister for Home and Territories until Labor's defeat at the 1931 election. This position was responsible for the development of Canberra and in 1930 he announced the establishment of a university college and in 1931, he abolished the Federal Capital Commission.

On the advice of the Northern Territory Pastoral Lessees' Association, Blakeley oversaw the re-establishment of the single Northern Territory, which in 1926 had been split into the separate territories of Central Australia and North Australia. The territories were disestablished effective 11 June 1931 by legislation passed the previous year. In 1931, Blakeley also proposed the establishment of a special court for Indigenous people in the Northern Territory, similar to the later community courts. He stated a desire for "a simple tribunal, presided over by a person or persons with a thorough knowledge of native customs, who can sift native evidence [...] I do not want a court restricted by all kinds of legal technicalities and procedures".

At the 1934 election, Blakeley was defeated by the Lang Labor candidate, Joe Clark.

== Later life ==
Blakeley moved to Melbourne and in 1935 he was appointed an inspector of the Commonwealth Court of Conciliation and Arbitration, which he worked for almost continuously until his retirement in 1952. His wife died in 1962, and he died in 1972 in the Melbourne suburb of Glen Iris, after a state funeral he was cremated. He was survived by two sons and two daughters.

== Notes ==
Political offices
| Preceded by Aubrey Abbott | Minister for Home Affairs; 1929–1932 | Succeeded by Archdale Parkhill |
Parliament of Australia
| Preceded by William Spence | Member for Darling; 1917–1934 | Succeeded by Joe Clark |
