= Josiah Thomas (politician) =

19th and 20th-century Australian politician

The Honourable Josiah Thomas
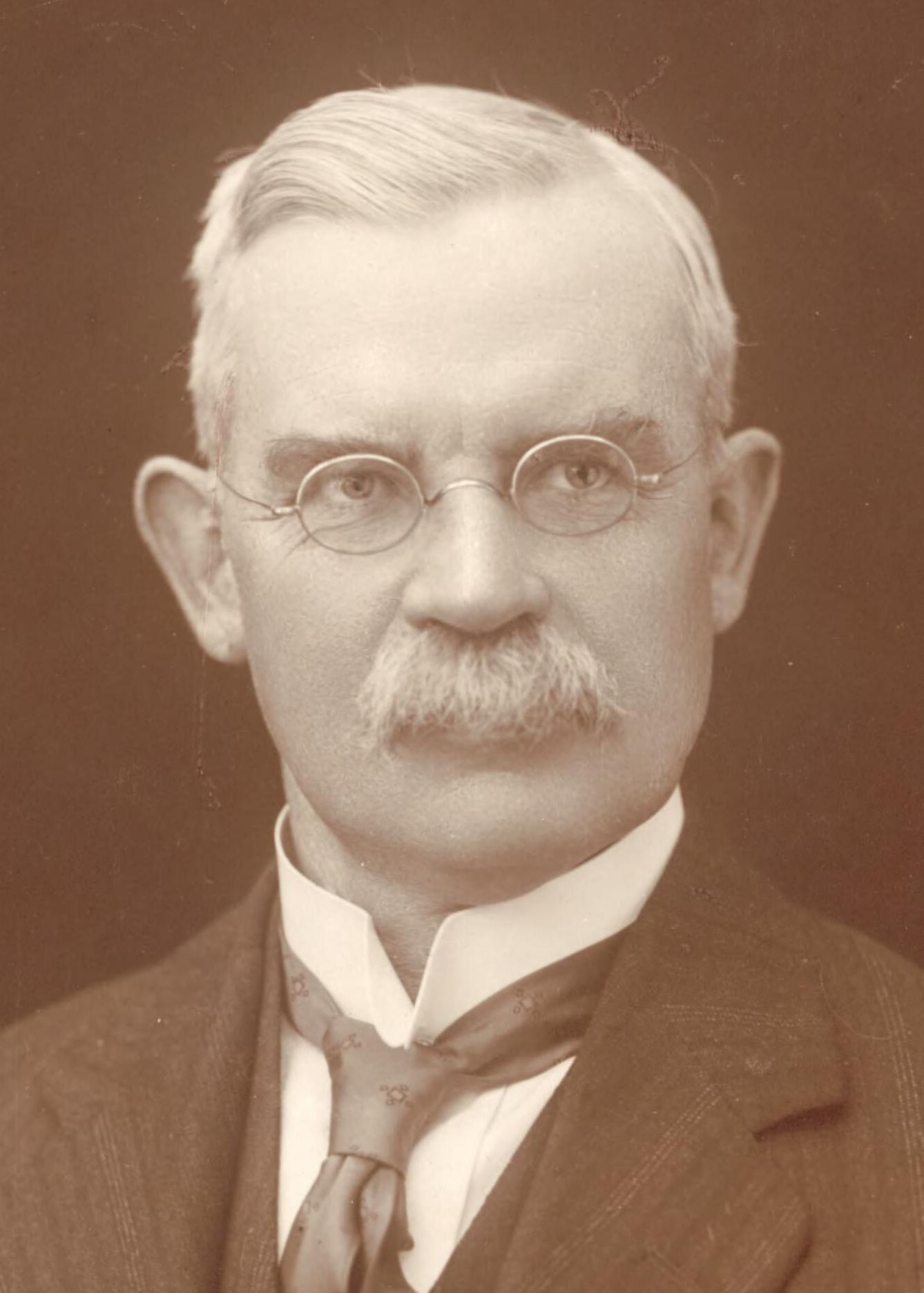

Minister for External Affairs
- In office 14 October 1911 – 24 June 1913
- Prime Minister: Andrew Fisher
- Preceded by: Lee Batchelor
- Succeeded by: Paddy Glynn

Postmaster-General of Australia
- In office 29 April 1910 – 14 October 1911
- Prime Minister: Andrew Fisher
- Preceded by: John Quick
- Succeeded by: Charlie Frazer
- In office 13 November 1908 – 2 June 1909
- Prime Minister: Andrew Fisher
- Preceded by: Samuel Mauger
- Succeeded by: John Quick

Senator for New South Wales
- In office 14 November 1925 – 30 June 1929
- In office 1 July 1917 – 30 June 1923

Member of the Australian Parliament for Barrier
- In office 29 March 1901 – 26 March 1917
- Preceded by: New seat
- Succeeded by: Michael Considine

Member of the New South Wales Parliament for Alma
- In office 17 July 1894 – 11 June 1901
- Preceded by: New seat
- Succeeded by: William Williams

Personal details
- Born: 28 April 1863 Camborne, Cornwall, England
- Died: 5 February 1933 (aged 69) Croydon Park, New South Wales, Australia
- Party: Labor (to 1917); Nationalist (from 1917)
- Spouses: Henrietta Ingleby (m. 1889–1901) Clara Ingleby (m. 1909)
- Occupation: Miner, trade unionist

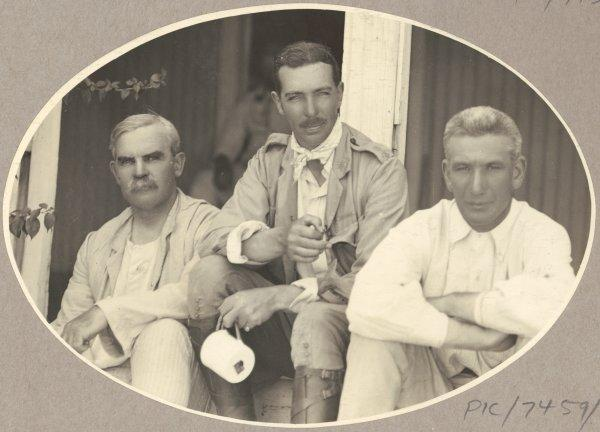
From left: Minister Josiah Thomas, Sir Walter Barttelot and Administrator John Gilruth.

Josiah Thomas (28 April 1863 – 5 February 1933) was an Australian politician. He was elected to the House of Representatives at the inaugural 1901 federal election, representing the Labor Party. Thomas served as a minister in Andrew Fisher's first two governments, as Postmaster-General (1908–1909, 1910–1911) and Minister for External Affairs (1911–1913). He joined the Nationalist Party after the 1916 Labor split and transferred to the Senate at the 1917 election, serving as a Senator for New South Wales from 1917 to 1923 and from 1925 to 1929.

== Early life ==
Thomas was born in Camborne, Cornwall, England, the son of Josiah Thomas Sr. and Ann Rablin. He went to Mexico as a child with his father, a mine manager, and later worked in mines in Cornwall. He travelled to Australia in the mid-1880s and worked at the Barrier Range, near Broken Hill. He was appointed as a member of a royal commission on collieries in 1886 and worked as a mining captain and assayer in 1890. He married Henrietta Lee Ingleby in July 1889 and they subsequently had two sons and one daughter.

Thomas was elected to the executive of the Amalgamated Miners' Association (AMA) in July 1891 and became president of its Broken Hill branch in 1892. He was a member of the Defence Committee formed during the 1892 Broken Hill miners' strike. As a result of his criticism of the magistracy in relation to the arrest of eight fellow committee-members on conspiracy charges, he was dismissed as a Justice of the Peace. The mining companies refused to give him work and he had to take up labouring, although as president of the AMA, he was appointed to a New South Wales Legislative Assembly inquiry into lead poisoning at the mines in 1892.

== New South Wales politics ==
Thomas was elected as the Labor Party member for Alma, covering part of Broken Hill in the Legislative Assembly in 1894, where he campaigned for improvements to workplace health and safety. He opposed the bills for the federation of Australia because he considered their referendums provisions inadequate.

== Federal politics ==
=== House of Representatives ===
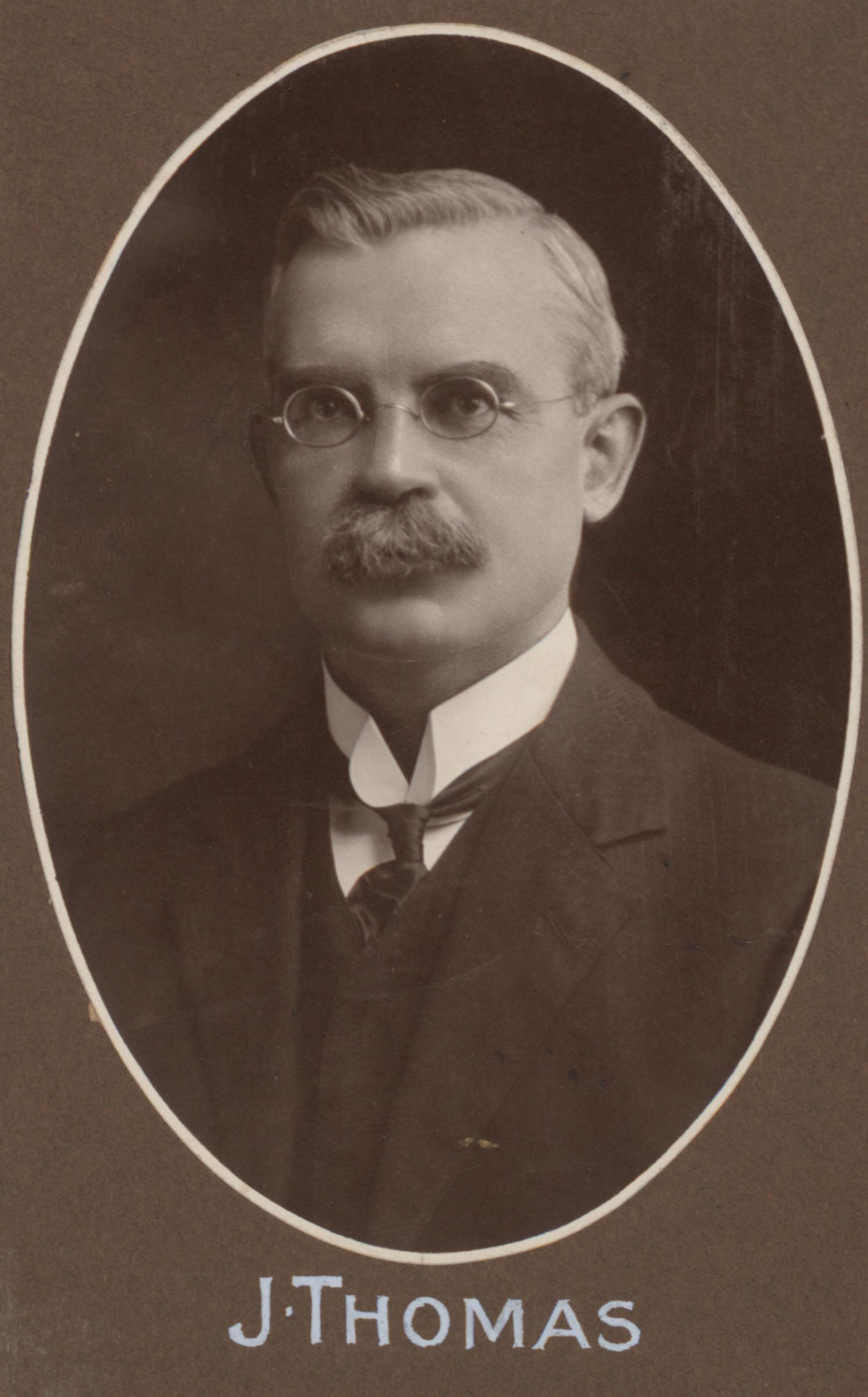
Thomas in 1908

Thomas was elected to the Australian House of Representatives in the inaugural election in 1901 for the seat of Barrier. He was appointed Postmaster-General in Andrew Fisher's first ministry from November 1908 to June 1909 and his second ministry from April 1910 to October 1911, when he became Minister for External Affairs on the death of Lee Batchelor. His appointment was welcomed by the Russian consul-general Alexander Abaza, who wrote to the Russian foreign ministry that "from the point of view of the foreign representatives here, this seems quite a felicitous choice, as the new Minister for External Affairs is known for his broad horizons – rather uncommon in Australia – and has none of that narrow Australian exclusivity". He held the position until the defeat of the government at the 1913 federal election.

Thomas visited England as a member of the Imperial Parliamentary Association in 1916 and was thus absent during Labor's split over conscription. On his return he joined Billy Hughes' Nationalist Party of Australia.

=== Senate ===
Thomas did not seek re-election in Barrier at the 1917 election, instead winning election to the Senate as a Nationalist. He was the first New South Welshman to have served in both houses of federal parliament.

In 1918 Thomas chaired the select committee on "the effect of intoxicating liquor on soldiers", submitting a dissenting report with senators William Bolton and James Guy that called for the introduction of prohibition. He sought to increase Senate scrutiny of the government by allowing ministers from the House of Representatives to appear in the chamber (and vice versa), successfully introducing a motion to that effect in 1920. However, the House failed to reciprocate.

Thomas was defeated at the 1922 election, but was re-appointed to the Senate on 13 January 1926 to fill a casual vacancy caused by the death of ALP senator Allan McDougall. He was again defeated at the 1928 election with his term expiring on 30 June 1929. In his final months he chaired a select committee into international wireless telegraphy, which recommended their nationalisation. The report was not accepted by the government of S. M. Bruce or his ALP successor James Scullin.

== Personal life ==
After politics, Thomas was active as a Methodist preacher opposed to gambling, smoking and drinking and in particular supporting prohibition of alcohol. He participated in the establishment of Sydney radio station 2CH by the New South Wales Council of Churches. Thomas' first wife died in 1901 and he married her sister Clara Ingleby in 1909. One of his sons with Henrietta was killed on the Western Front during World War I. He died of heart disease in the Sydney suburb of Croydon Park. He was survived by his second wife and a son from each of his marriages.

== Notes ==
Political offices
Preceded by Samuel Mauger	Postmaster-General; 1908–1909	Succeeded by John Quick
Preceded by John Quick	Postmaster-General; 1910–1911	Succeeded by Charlie Frazer
Preceded by Lee Batchelor	Minister for External Affairs; 1911–1913	Succeeded by Paddy Glynn
New South Wales Legislative Assembly
Preceded by New division	Member for Alma; 1894–1901	Succeeded by William Williams
Parliament of Australia
Preceded by New division	Member for Barrier; 1901–1917	Succeeded by Michael Considine
