= Division of Barrier =

Former Australian federal electoral division

Barrier Australian House of Representatives Division
- Created: 1901
- Abolished: 1922
- Namesake: Barrier Ranges

The Division of Barrier was an Australian electoral division in the state of New South Wales. The division was proclaimed in 1900, and was one of the original 65 divisions to be contested at the first federal election. It was named for the Barrier Ranges near the city of Broken Hill in western New South Wales. In 1901, it included Broken Hill, Wilcannia, White Cliffs and Tibooburra and the surrounding pastoral areas. In 1906, it gained Menindee, Wentworth from Riverina and in 1913, it gained Balranald and Deniliquin from Riverina. It was abolished in 1922 with Broken Hill, Wentworth and Balranald being transferred to Darling and Deniliquin transferred to Riverina. It was a very safe seat for the Australian Labor Party, although both its members left the ALP at the end their terms: Josiah Thomas to join the Nationalists, and Michael Considine (a radical socialist) to sit as an independent.

Between 1906 and its abolition in 1922, Barrier covered the north-west and south-west corners of the state, the Cameron Corner and the MacCabe Corner respectively.

== Members ==
| Image | Member | Party | Term | Notes |
|---|---|---|---|---|
| | Josiah Thomas (1863–1933) | Labor | 29 March 1901 – 14 November 1916 | Previously held the New South Wales Legislative Assembly seat of Alma. Served as minister under Fisher. Transferred to the Senate |
| | Josiah Thomas (1863–1933) | National Labor | 14 November 1916 – 17 February 1917 | Previously held the New South Wales Legislative Assembly seat of Alma. Served as minister under Fisher. Transferred to the Senate |
| | Josiah Thomas (1863–1933) | Nationalist | 17 February 1917 – 5 May 1917 | Previously held the New South Wales Legislative Assembly seat of Alma. Served as minister under Fisher. Transferred to the Senate |
| | Michael Considine (1885–1959) | Labor | 5 May 1917 – 1920 | Failed to win the Division of Darling after Barrier was abolished in 1922 |
| | Michael Considine (1885–1959) | Socialist Labor | 1920 – 1921 | Failed to win the Division of Darling after Barrier was abolished in 1922 |
| | Michael Considine (1885–1959) | Industrial Labor | 1921 – 16 December 1922 | Failed to win the Division of Darling after Barrier was abolished in 1922 |
