= Division of Darling =

Former Australian federal electoral division

Darling Australian House of Representatives Division
- Created: 1901
- Abolished: 1977
- Namesake: Darling River

The Division of Darling was an Australian electoral division in the state of New South Wales. The division was proclaimed in 1900, and was one of the original 65 divisions to be contested at the first federal election. From 1901 until 1922 it was based on Bourke, Cobar, Nyngan, Coonamble and Gilgandra. From 1906, it also included Dubbo. The 1922 redistribution increased the number of voters in some rural electorates and as a result the division of Barrier was abolished with most of its population, including the large mining town of Broken Hill, Wentworth and Balranald, was absorbed by Darling along with Hay from Riverina. Dubbo was transferred to Gwydir in 1922 but returned to Darling in 1934. In 1948, Dubbo, Gilgandra and Coonamble were transferred to the new division of Lawson and Hay and Balranald were transferred to Riverina. In 1955, Coonamble returned to Darling. In 1977, it was abolished with Broken Hill and Wentworth going to Riverina and Bourke, Cobar, Nyngan and Coonamble going to Gwydir.

Between 1922 and its abolition in 1977, Darling covered the north-west and south-west corners of the state, the Cameron Corner and the MacCabe Corner respectively. As of 2026, majority of the area covered by Darling at the time of abolition is now covered by the Division of Parkes.

Darling was named for the Darling River. It was a safe seat for the Australian Labor Party, which held it for all but seven months of its history. It was one of the few country seats where Labor usually did well. As a measure of Labor's strength in the seat, Labor held it without serious difficulty even in years it was routed nationally.

A few years after the seat's abolition and replacement by the expanded division of Riverina, the latter was briefly renamed Riverina-Darling between 1984 and 1993, also named after the river.

Its most prominent member was William Spence, one of the founders of the Labor Party and the Australian Workers' Union. Spence was also the only non-Labor member ever to hold the seat, having left the party in the 1916 split. He ultimately joined the Nationalist Party, only to lose the seat in 1917.

== Members ==
| Image | Member | Party | Term | Notes |
|---|---|---|---|---|
| | William Spence (1846–1926) | Labor | 29 March 1901 – 14 November 1916 | Previously held the New South Wales Legislative Assembly seat of Cobar. Served as minister under Fisher and Hughes. Lost seat. Later elected to the Division of Darwin in 1917 |
| | William Spence (1846–1926) | National Labor | 14 November 1916 – 17 February 1917 | Previously held the New South Wales Legislative Assembly seat of Cobar. Served as minister under Fisher and Hughes. Lost seat. Later elected to the Division of Darwin in 1917 |
| | William Spence (1846–1926) | Nationalist | 17 February 1917 – 5 May 1917 | Previously held the New South Wales Legislative Assembly seat of Cobar. Served as minister under Fisher and Hughes. Lost seat. Later elected to the Division of Darwin in 1917 |
| | Arthur Blakeley (1886–1972) | Labor | 5 May 1917 – 15 September 1934 | Served as minister under Scullin. Lost seat |
| | Joe Clark (1897–1992) | Labor (NSW) | 15 September 1934 – February 1936 | Retired |
| | Joe Clark (1897–1992) | Labor | February 1936 – 29 September 1969 | Retired |
| | John FitzPatrick (1915–1997) | Labor | 25 October 1969 – 10 December 1977 | Transferred to the Division of Riverina after Darling was abolished in 1977 |
