= Fisher Ministry =

Fisher Ministry may refer to:

- First Fisher Ministry
- Second Fisher Ministry
- Third Fisher Ministry
