= Willie Kelly (politician) =

Australian politician (1877–1960)

The Honourable Willie Kelly
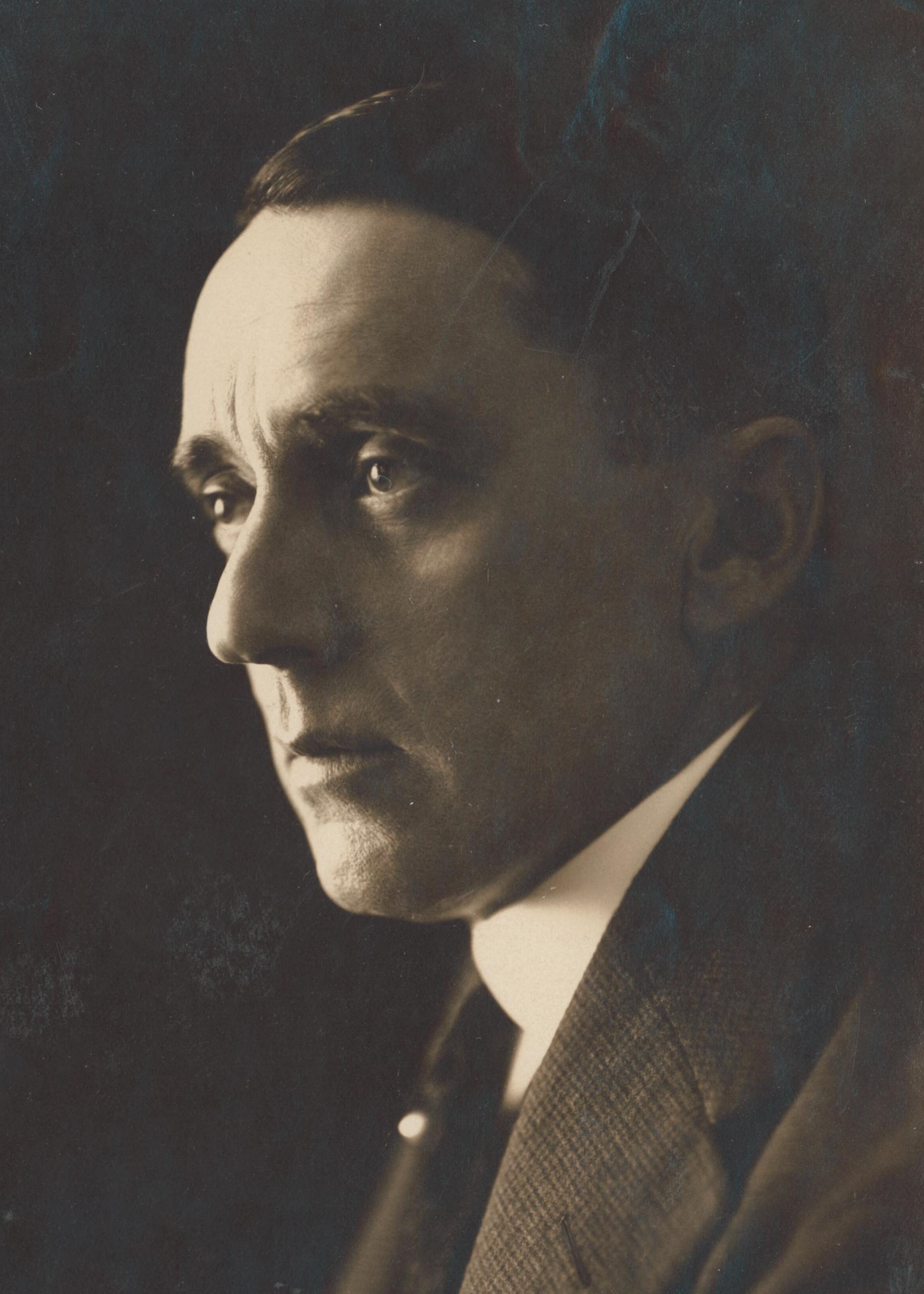

Member of the Australian Parliament for Wentworth
- In office 16 December 1903 – 3 November 1919
- Preceded by: William McMillan
- Succeeded by: Walter Marks

Personal details
- Born: 1 December 1877 Sydney
- Died: 27 January 1960 (aged 82) Camperdown, New South Wales
- Party: Free Trade (1903–06); Anti-Socialist (1906–09); Liberal (1909–17); Nationalist (1917–19)
- Spouse: Olive Miller
- Relations: Frederick Kelly (brother); Ethel Knight Kelly (sister-in-law)

William Henry Kelly (1 December 1877 – 27 January 1960) was an Australian politician. He was a member of the House of Representatives from 1903 to 1919, and served as an honorary minister under Prime Minister Joseph Cook from 1913 to 1914.

== Early life ==
Kelly was born in Sydney on 1 December 1877. He was the third son born to Mary Ann (née Dick) and Thomas Hussey Kelly; his younger brother Frederick Kelly was a professional musician.

Kelly grew up at Glenyarrah, his family's mansion in Double Bay. He was a boarder at All Saints College, Bathurst, before being sent to England to attend Eton College from 1893 to 1896. His father, born in Ireland, was a prominent businessman in Sydney who left an estate valued at £259,000 (equivalent to $44,620,000 in 2022) on his death in 1901.

After returning from England, Kelly became a prominent society figure, holding memberships in the Australian Club, the Union Club and the Melbourne Club. He married professional actress Olive Morrell in London in 1908, with whom he had one daughter.

== Politics ==
In 1903 Kelly was elected to the seat of Wentworth in the Australian House of Representatives, representing the Free Trade Party.

In parliament, Kelly was known for his habit of smoking cigars in the chamber, although he was eventually asked to stop by the speaker Frederick Holder. This combined with his Etonian manners meant he was held in little regard by the Australian Labor Party (ALP). Billy Hughes once said that he had "as much idea of the work of the world as a butterfly has of casting an 81-ton gun". In May 1909, at the instigation of Alfred Deakin, Kelly moved the motion to adjourn that ended ALP leader Andrew Fisher's first term as prime minister.

From June 1913 to September 1914, Kelly was an honorary minister in the Cook Ministry. He reversed King O'Malley's decision to build Walter Burley Griffin's plan for Canberra using the departmental plan and instead appointed Griffin as Federal capital director of design and construction. He also negotiated a plan for standardisation of Australia's rail gauge, but this was scrapped when the Fisher government came to power in September 1914. He was in opposition until the formation of the Nationalist Government in February 1917. He did not get a ministry in the Hughes government and retired at the 1919 election.

== Later life ==
Kelly separated from his wife, who took their daughter Mary Wentworth Kelly back to England. He died at the Royal Prince Alfred Hospital in the Sydney suburb of Camperdown, aged 82. He was the last surviving member of Joseph Cook's Cabinet, as well as the last surviving MP who served during Alfred Deakin's three tenures as prime minister, as well as during the Prime Ministerships of Chris Watson, George Reid and Andrew Fisher's first tenure.

His younger brother was the composer and oarsman Frederick Septimus Kelly.

== Notes ==
Parliament of Australia
Preceded by William McMillan	Member for Wentworth; 1903–1919	Succeeded by Walter Marks
