= Cook ministry =

9th ministry of the government of Australia

- 9th Ministry of Australia

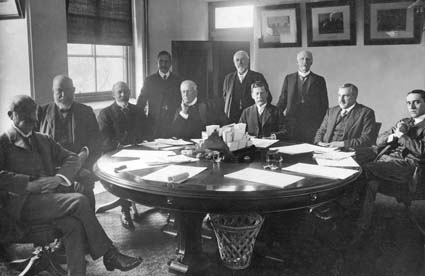
- Group photo of the Cook ministry
- Date formed: 24 June 1913
- Date dissolved: 17 September 1914

People and organisations
- Monarch: George V
- Governor-General: Lord Denman; Sir Ronald Munro Ferguson
- Prime Minister: Joseph Cook
- No. of ministers: 10
- Member party: Liberal
- Status in legislature: Majority government
- Opposition party: Labor
- Opposition leader: Andrew Fisher

History
- Election: 31 May 1913
- Outgoing election: 5 September 1914
- Legislature term: 5th
- Predecessor: Second Fisher ministry
- Successor: Third Fisher ministry

The Cook ministry (Liberal) was the 9th ministry of the Government of Australia. It was led by the country's 6th Prime Minister, Joseph Cook. The Cook Ministry succeeded the Second Fisher ministry, which dissolved on 24 June 1913 following the federal election that took place in May which saw the Liberals defeat Andrew Fisher's Labor Party - albeit with a one-seat majority. The ministry was replaced by the Third Fisher ministry on 17 September 1914 following the federal election that took place on 5 September which saw Labor defeat the Liberals.

Willie Kelly, who died in 1960, was the last surviving member of the Cook ministry.

== Ministry ==
Party	Minister	Portrait	Portfolio
Liberal	Joseph Cook (1860–1947) MP for Parramatta (1901–1921)		Prime Minister; Leader of the Liberal Party; Minister for Home Affairs
Liberal	Sir William Irvine (1858–1943) MP for Flinders (1906–1918)		Attorney-General
Liberal	Sir John Forrest (1847–1918) MP for Swan (1901–1918)		Deputy Leader of the Liberal Party; Treasurer
Liberal	Paddy Glynn (1855–1931) MP for Angas (1903–1919)		Minister for External Affairs
Liberal	Edward Millen (1860–1923) Senator for New South Wales (1901–1923)		Minister for Defence; Leader of the Government in the Senate
Liberal	Littleton Groom (1867–1936) MP for Darling Downs (1901–1929)		Minister for Trade and Customs
Liberal	Agar Wynne (1850–1934) MP for Balaclava (1906–1914)		Postmaster-General
Liberal	James McColl (1844–1929) Senator for Victoria (1907–1914)		Vice-President of the Executive Council
Liberal	John Clemons (1862–1944) Senator for Tasmania (1901–1914)		Minister without Portfolio
Liberal	Willie Kelly (1877–1960) MP for Wentworth (1903–1919)		Minister without Portfolio
