= Andrew Fisher's Cottage =

Andrew Fishers Cottage
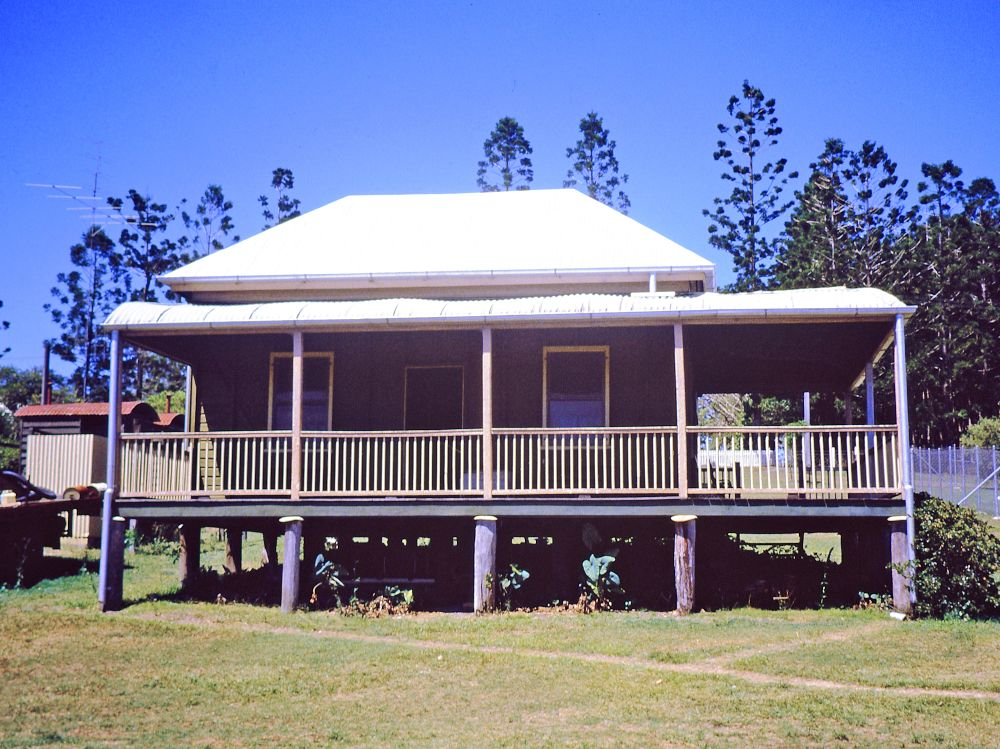
- Andrew Fisher's Cottage

- Location within Queensland Location within Australia
- 26.2132°S 152.6845°E
- Location: 215 Brisbane Road, Monkland, Gympie Region, Queensland, Australia

History
- Design period: 1870s–1890s (late 19th century)
- Built: c. 1870

Queensland Heritage Register
- Official name: Andrew Fishers Cottage
- Type: state heritage
- Designated: 21 October 1992
- Reference no.: 600537
- Significant period: 1870s
- Significant components: residential accommodation – main house

Andrew Fisher's Cottage is a heritage-listed house at 215 Brisbane Road, Monkland, Gympie Region, Queensland, Australia. It was built c. 1870. It was added to the Queensland Heritage Register on 21 October 1992.

== History ==
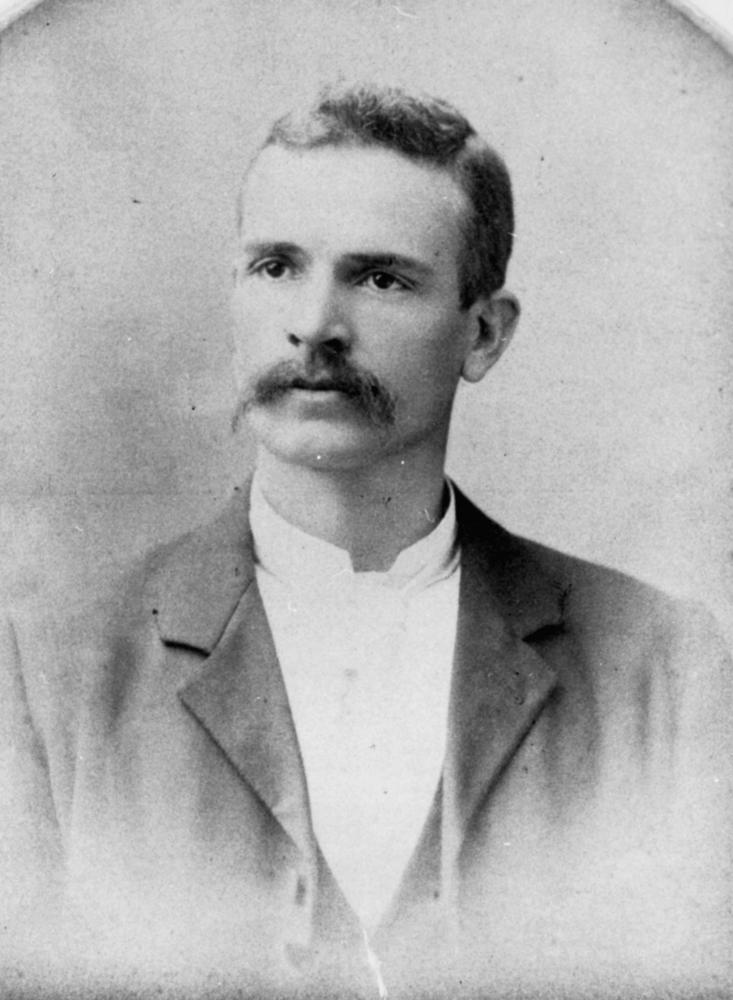
Andrew Fisher, 1899

Andrew Fisher's Cottage was erected c. 1870 and is a simple timber structure, representative of many other miner's house in the district. Originally located in Maori Lane at Red Hill, Gympie, it was relocated to is current site in 1972.

The house was owned by the family of Andrew Fisher's wife, Margaret Irvine, and Andrew and Margaret Fisher are thought to have resided in the house for a short period after their marriage in 1901. Fisher met Margaret whilst residing at her family home in Crown Street, Gympie.

Andrew Fisher was the first Queenslander to become Prime Minister of Australia. Having worked in mines in his birthplace of Ayrshire, Scotland since the age of ten, he arrived in Queensland in 1885. He was previously involved in miner's unions in Scotland where he was blacklisted for his association with the 1881 miners strikes. He continued his association with unions and the Labour movement in Queensland, becoming secretary and then president of the Gympie Branch of the Amalgamated Miner's Association. His foray into politics began with his election to the Queensland Legislative Assembly in 1893, followed by his election to the Australian House of Representatives in the first parliament of the Federation of Australia. He was appointed as Prime Minister after Alfred Deakin's resignation in 1908. He was re-elected in 1910 and it was during this term that he passed many influential bills and established the Commonwealth Bank.

By the time Fisher arrived in Gympie in the late 1880s, it was a well established town. Gold had been discovered in the area by James Nash in 1867, providing the impetus for a rush of prospectors to the area. By 1869, Gympie had a population of many thousands and had been established so rapidly that by the time the official surveyors arrived in 1868, a substantial amount of the town had already been laid out.

== Description ==
Andrew Fisher's Cottage is located within the Gympie and District Historical Society Mining Museum. It sits adjacent to other buildings also relocated to the site, including school buildings and those associated with mining and farming.

The cottage is a typical four room single skin timber dwelling with exposed studs externally. It has a verandah with new balustrading to the south-west and south-east elevations and the roof has been re-clad with new corrugated iron. The cottage has been re-painted internally and externally, the internal finish appearing to imitate the wood grain.

Entrance to the cottage is from the rear, either into the house itself or via a ramp onto the verandah. Internally, all walls on either side of the central hallway have been replaced with aluminium framed glass sliding doors which allow observation of the four rooms. Each of these rooms contain large collections of early furnishings.

== Heritage listing ==
Andrew Fisher's Cottage was listed on the Queensland Heritage Register on 21 October 1992 having satisfied the following criteria.

The place is important in demonstrating the evolution or pattern of Queensland's history.

The place has a strong or special association with a particular community or cultural group for social, cultural or spiritual reasons.

Andrew Fisher was a Gympie miner whose involvement in the mining unions led to a political career culminating in him becoming the first Queenslander to serve as Prime Minister of Australia. Andrew Fisher's Cottage was owned by Fisher's wife's family, the Irvines. The Fishers reputedly stayed in the house for a short period after their marriage.

The cottage was moved to the site of the Gympie and District Historical Society Mining Museum in 1972 and has special association with that group. The Historical Society have carried out extensive renovations on the cottage and value it as a significant part of their historical village.
