= Second Fisher ministry =

8th ministry of the government of Australia

- 8th Ministry of Australia

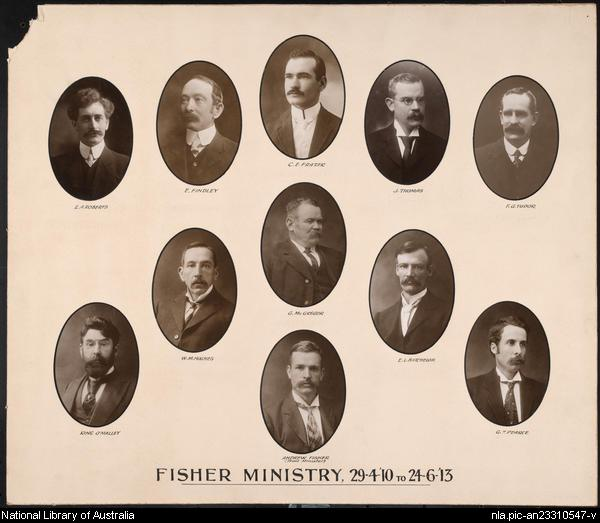
- Photo of the Second Fisher ministry
- Date formed: 29 April 1910
- Date dissolved: 24 June 1913

People and organisations
- Monarch: Edward VII; George V
- Governor-General: Lord Dudley; Lord Denman
- Prime Minister: Andrew Fisher
- No. of ministers: 11
- Member party: Labor
- Status in legislature: Majority government
- Opposition party: Liberal
- Opposition leader: Alfred Deakin; Joseph Cook

History
- Election: 13 April 1910
- Outgoing election: 31 May 1913
- Legislature term: 4th
- Predecessor: Third Deakin ministry
- Successor: Cook ministry

The Second Fisher ministry (Australian Labor Party) was the 8th ministry of the Government of Australia. It was led by the country's 5th Prime Minister, Andrew Fisher. The Second Fisher ministry succeeded the Third Deakin ministry, which dissolved on 29 April 1910 following the federal election that took place on 13 April which saw Labor defeat the Alfred Deakin's Liberal Party. It is the first federal government in Australian history to be elected with a majority in the House of Representatives, as well as the first majority national Labor government in the world. The ministry was replaced by the Cook ministry on 24 June 1913 following the federal election that took place in May which saw the Liberals defeat Labor.

King O'Malley, who died in 1953, was the last surviving member of the Second Fisher ministry; O'Malley was also the last surviving member of the First Hughes ministry.

== Ministry ==
Party	Minister	Portrait	Portfolio
Labor	Andrew Fisher (1862–1928) MP for Wide Bay (1901–1915)		Prime Minister; Leader of the Labor Party; Treasurer
Labor	Billy Hughes (1862–1952) MP for West Sydney (1901–1917)		Attorney-General
Labor	King O'Malley (1858–1953) MP for Darwin (1903–1917)		Minister for Home Affairs
Labor	Lee Batchelor (1865–1911) MP for Boothby (1903–1911)		Minister for External Affairs (to 8 October 1911)
Labor	George Pearce (1870–1952) Senator for Western Australia (1901–1938)		Minister for Defence
Labor	Frank Tudor (1866–1922) MP for Yarra (1901–1922)		Minister for Trade and Customs
Labor	Josiah Thomas (1863–1933) MP for Barrier (1901–1917)		Postmaster-General (to 14 October 1911); Minister for External Affairs (from 14 October 1911)
Labor	Gregor McGregor (1848–1914) Senator for South Australia (1901–1914)		Vice-President of the Executive Council; Leader of the Government in the Senate; Deputy Leader of the Labor Party
Labor	Edward Findley (1864–1947) Senator for Victoria (1904–1917)		Minister without Portfolio
Labor	Charlie Frazer (1880–1913) MP for Kalgoorlie (1903–1913)		Minister without Portfolio (to 14 October 1911); Postmaster-General (from 14 October 1911)
Labor	Ernest Roberts (1868–1913) MP for Adelaide (1908–1913) (in Ministry from 23 October 1911)		Minister without Portfolio (from 23 October 1911)
