= Third Fisher ministry =

11th ministry of the government of Australia

- 10th Ministry of Australia

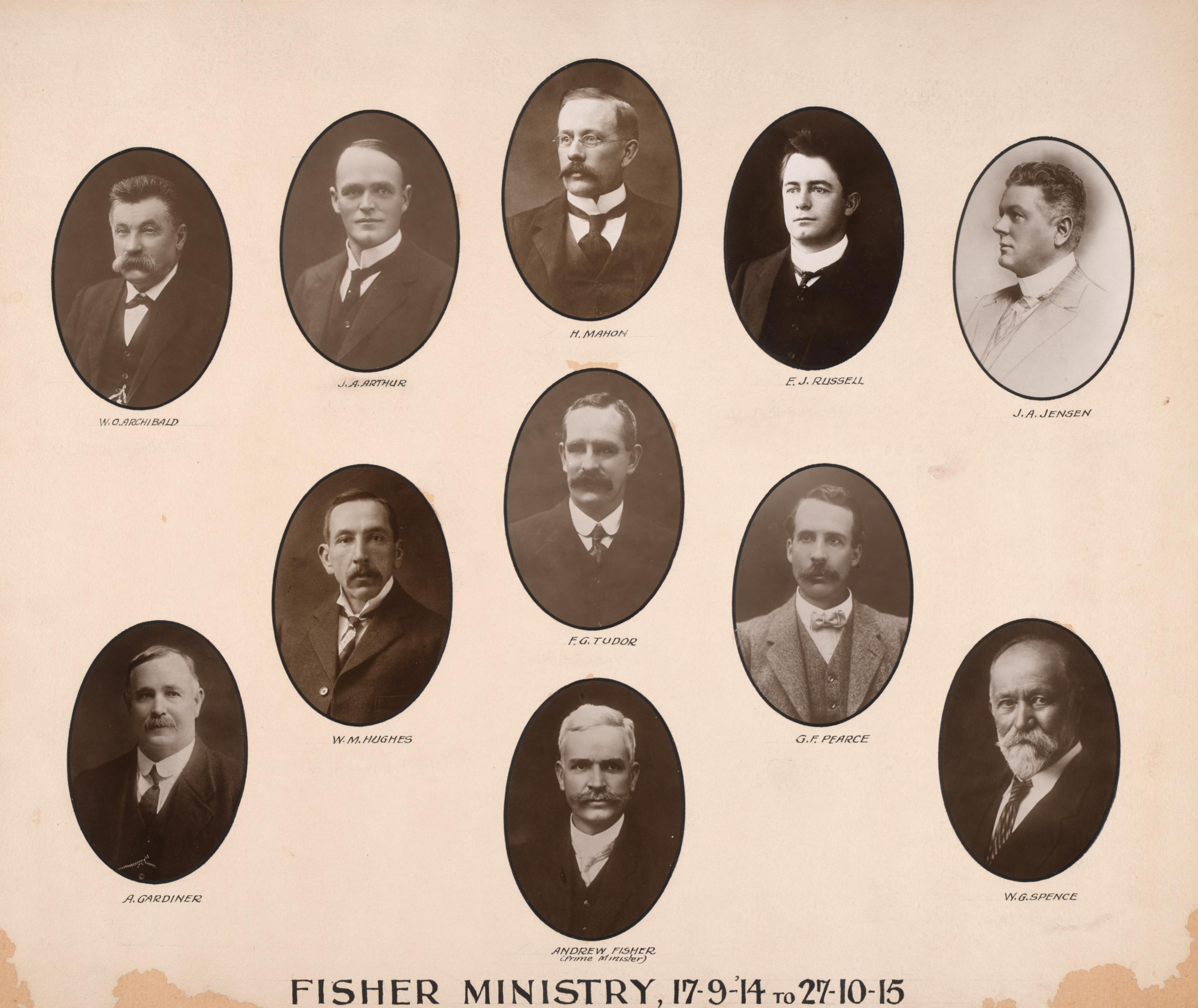
- Photo of the Third Fisher ministry
- Date formed: 17 September 1914
- Date dissolved: 27 October 1915

People and organisations
- Monarch: George V
- Governor-General: Sir Ronald Munro Ferguson
- Prime Minister: Andrew Fisher
- No. of ministers: 11
- Member party: Labor
- Status in legislature: Majority government
- Opposition party: Liberal
- Opposition leader: Joseph Cook

History
- Election: 5 September 1914
- Legislature term: 6th
- Predecessor: Cook ministry
- Successor: First Hughes ministry

The Third Fisher ministry (Labor) was the 10th ministry of the Government of Australia. It was led by the country's 5th Prime Minister, Andrew Fisher. The Third Fisher ministry succeeded the Cook ministry, which dissolved on 17 September 1914 following the federal election that took place on 5 September which saw Labor defeat Joseph Cook's Liberals. The ministry was replaced by the First Hughes ministry on 27 October 1915 following Fisher's retirement from Parliament to become the next High Commissioner to the United Kingdom.

Billy Hughes, who died in 1952, was the last surviving member of the Third Fisher ministry; Hughes was also the last surviving member of the Watson ministry, First Fisher ministry, Second Hughes ministry and Third Hughes ministry.

== Ministry ==
Party	Minister	Portrait	Portfolio
Labor	Andrew Fisher (1862–1928) MP for Wide Bay (1901–1915)		Prime Minister; Leader of the Labor Party; Treasurer
Labor	Billy Hughes (1862–1952) MP for West Sydney (1901–1917)		Deputy Leader of the Labor Party; Attorney-General
Labor	William Archibald (1850–1926) MP for Hindmarsh (1910–1919)		Minister for Home Affairs
Labor	John Arthur (1875–1914) MP for Bendigo (1913–1914)		Minister for External Affairs (to 9 December 1914)
Labor	George Pearce (1870–1952) Senator for Western Australia (1901–1938)		Minister for Defence; Leader of the Government in the Senate
Labor	Frank Tudor (1866–1922) MP for Yarra (1901–1922)		Minister for Trade and Customs
Labor	William Spence (1846–1926) MP for Darling (1901–1917)		Postmaster-General
Labor	Albert Gardiner (1867–1952) Senator for New South Wales (1910–1926)		Vice-President of the Executive Council
Labor	Hugh Mahon (1857–1931) MP for Kalgoorlie (1913–1917)		Assistant Minister (to 14 December 1914); Minister for External Affairs (from 14 December 1914)
Labor	Jens Jensen (1865–1936) MP for Bass (1910–1919)		Assistant Minister (to 12 July 1915); Minister for the Navy (from 12 July 1915)
Labor	Edward Russell (1878–1925) Senator for Victoria (1907–1925)		Assistant Minister
