= Andrew Fisher =

Australian prime minister (1862–1928)

The Right Honourable Andrew Fisher
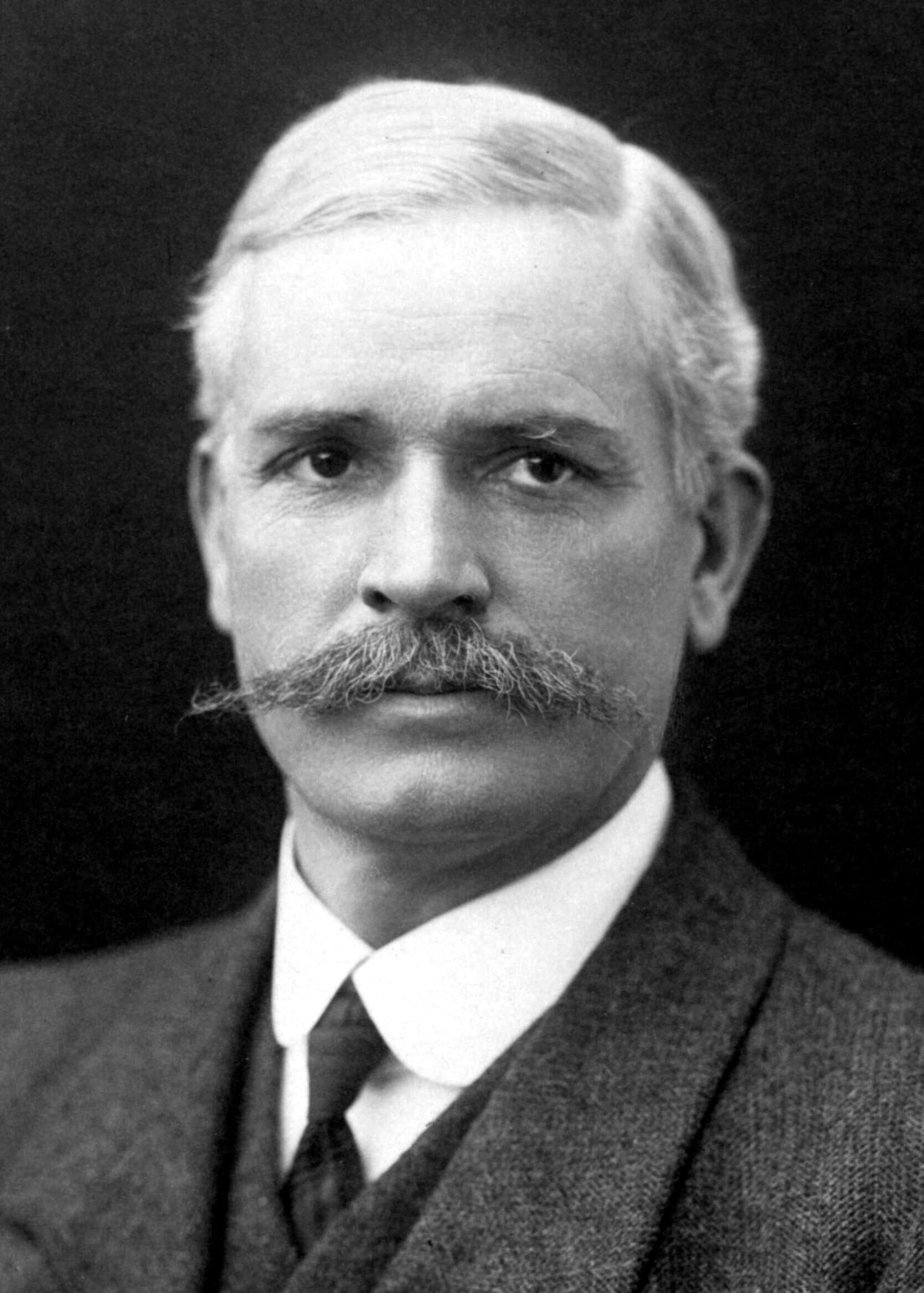
- Fisher in 1912

5th Prime Minister of Australia
- In office 17 September 1914 – 27 October 1915
- Monarch: George V
- Governor-General: Sir Ronald Munro Ferguson
- Preceded by: Joseph Cook
- Succeeded by: Billy Hughes
- In office 29 April 1910 – 24 June 1913
- Monarchs: Edward VII; George V
- Governors-General: Lord Dudley; Lord Denman
- Preceded by: Alfred Deakin
- Succeeded by: Joseph Cook
- In office 13 November 1908 – 2 June 1909
- Monarch: Edward VII
- Governor-General: Lord Dudley
- Preceded by: Alfred Deakin
- Succeeded by: Alfred Deakin

Leader of the Opposition
- In office 8 July 1913 – 17 September 1914
- Prime Minister: Joseph Cook
- Preceded by: Joseph Cook
- Succeeded by: Joseph Cook
- In office 2 June 1909 – 29 April 1910
- Prime Minister: Alfred Deakin
- Preceded by: Alfred Deakin
- Succeeded by: Alfred Deakin

Leader of the Labor Party
- In office 30 October 1907 – 27 October 1915
- Deputy: Gregor McGregor; Billy Hughes
- Preceded by: Chris Watson
- Succeeded by: Billy Hughes

High Commissioner to the United Kingdom
- In office 1 January 1916 – 22 April 1921
- Preceded by: Sir George Reid
- Succeeded by: Joseph Cook

Member of the Australian Parliament for Wide Bay
- In office 30 March 1901 – 26 October 1915
- Preceded by: Seat created
- Succeeded by: Edward Corser

Member of the Queensland Legislative Assembly for Gympie
- In office 25 March 1899 – 9 May 1901 Serving with George Ryland
- Preceded by: Jacob Stumm
- Succeeded by: Daniel Mulcahy
- In office 25 May 1893 – 11 April 1896 Serving with William Smyth
- Preceded by: Matthew Mellor
- Succeeded by: Jacob Stumm

Personal details
- Born: 29 August 1862 Crosshouse, Ayrshire, Scotland
- Died: 22 October 1928 (aged 66) Hampstead, London, England
- Resting place: Hampstead Cemetery
- Party: Labor
- Spouse: Margaret Irvine (m. 1901)
- Children: 6
- Profession: Politician; miner; trade unionist

Andrew Fisher (29 August 1862 – 22 October 1928) was the fifth prime minister of Australia from 1908 to 1909, from 1910 to 1913 and from 1914 to 1915. He held office as the leader of the Australian Labor Party (ALP), and was particularly notable for leading the party to its first federal election victory and first majority government at the 1910 federal election.

Fisher was born in Crosshouse, Ayrshire, Scotland. He left school at a young age to work in the nearby coal mines, becoming secretary of the local branch of the Ayrshire Miners' Union at the age of 17. Fisher emigrated to Australia in 1885, where he continued his involvement with trade unionism. He settled in Gympie, Queensland, and in 1893 was elected to the Queensland Legislative Assembly as a representative of the Labor Party. Fisher lost his seat in 1896, but returned in 1899 and later that year briefly was a minister in the government of Anderson Dawson.

In 1901, Fisher was elected to the new federal parliament representing the Division of Wide Bay. He was the Minister for Trade and Customs for a few months in 1904, in the short-lived government of Chris Watson. Fisher was elected deputy leader of the ALP in 1905 and replaced Watson as leader in 1907. He initially provided support to the minority government of Protectionist leader Alfred Deakin, but in November 1908 the ALP withdrew its support and Deakin resigned as prime minister. Fisher subsequently formed a minority government of his own. It lasted only a few months, as in June 1909 Deakin returned as prime minister at the head of a new anti-socialist Liberal Party.

Fisher returned as prime minister after the 1910 federal election, which saw Labor attain majority government for the first time in its history. His second government passed wide-ranging reforms – old-age and disability pensions, enshrined new workers' rights in legislation, established the Commonwealth Bank, oversaw the continued expansion of the Royal Australian Navy, began construction on the Trans-Australian Railway, and formally established what is now the Australian Capital Territory. However, at the 1913 election the ALP narrowly lost its House of Representatives majority to the Liberal Party, with Fisher being replaced as prime minister by Joseph Cook.

After just over a year in office, Cook was forced to call a new election, the first double dissolution. Labor won back its majority in the House, and Fisher returned for a third term as prime minister. During the election campaign he famously declared that Australia would defend Britain "to the last man and the last shilling". However, he struggled with the demands of Australia's participation in World War I and in October 1915 resigned in favour of his deputy Billy Hughes. Fisher subsequently accepted an appointment as the High Commissioner of Australia to the United Kingdom, holding the position from 1916 to 1920. After a brief return to Australia, he retired to London, dying there at the age of 66. His cumulative total of just under five years as prime minister is the second-longest by an ALP leader, surpassed only by Bob Hawke.

== Early life ==
=== Birth and family background ===
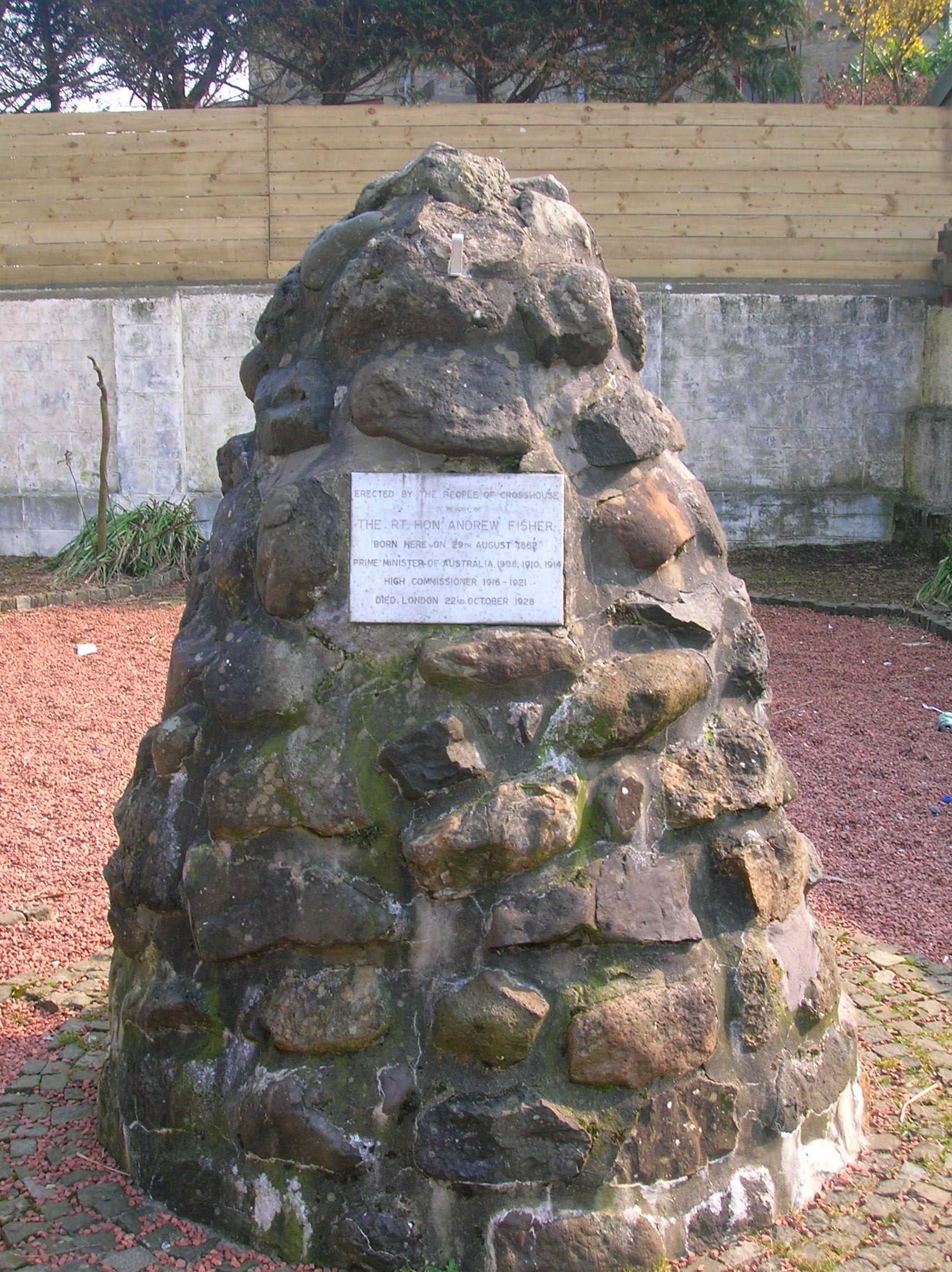
Memorial cairn in Crosshouse, Fisher's birthplace in rural Scotland

Fisher was born on 29 August 1862 in Crosshouse, a mining village 2 miles (3.2 km) west of Kilmarnock, Scotland. He was the second of eight children born to Jane (née Garven or Garvin) and Robert Fisher; he had one older brother, four younger brothers, and two younger sisters. His younger sister died at the age of 10 in 1879, the only one of the siblings not to live to adulthood. Fisher's mother was the daughter of a blacksmith and worked as a domestic servant. On his father's side, he was descended from a long line of Ayrshire coalminers. According to family tradition, his paternal grandfather was persecuted for his involvement in the fledgling union movement, and on one occasion was left homeless with five young children. Although he was probably only partially literate, (Note: On his marriage certificate, Fisher's mother signed her name but his father signed an "X". He may have been able to read, however, as schools in the early 19th century sometimes charged separately for reading and writing.) Fisher's father was prominent in the local community and involved with various community organisations. He was the leader of a temperance society, and in 1863 was one of ten miners who co-founded a cooperative society. He and his family were active members of the Free Church of Scotland.

=== Childhood ===
Fisher spent most of his childhood living in a miners' row, which had an earthen floor and no running water. He was kicked in the head by a cow as a small child, leaving him mostly deaf in one ear. The injury may have contributed to a childhood speech impediment and his reserved nature as an adult. As a boy, Fisher and his brothers fished in Carmel Water, a tributary of the River Irvine, and enjoyed long walks across the countryside. He was athletic, helping form a local football team, and stood 178 centimetres (5 ft 10 in) as an adult, above the average at the time. In later life, Fisher recalled attending four schools as a boy. The exact details are uncertain, but he is known to have finished his schooling in Crosshouse and to have attended a school in nearby Dreghorn for a period. (Note: Fisher recounted in 1911 that he had begun his education at "a little private school", before attending "the old schoolhouse" in Crosshouse, the village school in Dreghorn, and then a new school in Crosshouse. He probably also attended Sunday school.) The standard of public education in Scotland was relatively high at the time, and his schoolmaster in Crosshouse had received formal training in Edinburgh; the main focus of the curriculum was on the three Rs. He later supplemented his limited formal education by attending night school in Kilmarnock and reading at the town library.

The exact age at which Fisher left school is uncertain, but he could have been as young as nine or as old as thirteen. (Note: Bastian believes that Fisher left when he was nine years old, and may have exaggerated his leaving age as an adult because he was self-conscious about his lack of education. He suggests that he was withdrawn from school early to avoid the provisions of the newly enacted Education (Scotland) Act 1872, which mandated compulsory attendance until the age of 13. The price of coal and miners' wages increased during the Franco-Prussian War, which may have provided a financial incentive for younger children to begin work; however, it would still have been illegal for a nine-year-old to work in the mines. Day instead argues that Fisher remained in school until he was thirteen. His parents were known to value education and could afford to have him stay in school until the legal leaving age. He notes a 1911 interview in which Fisher gave his leaving age as thirteen, and suggests that references to him being underground at an earlier age are ambiguous, as he could have simply been visiting his father and older brother rather than actually working.) He is believed to have begun his working life as a coal trapper, opening and closing the trapdoors that allowed for ventilation and the movement of coal. He was later placed in charge of the pit ponies, and finally took his place performing "pick-and-shovel work" at the coalface. When he was 16, he was promoted to air-pump operator, which required additional training and was seen as a relatively prestigious position. Fisher's father had black lung disease, and gave up mining around the same time as his oldest sons began working. He subsequently became the manager of the foodstore at the local cooperative, and the family moved out of miners' row. They later lived in Kilmaurs for a period, but eventually returned to Crosshouse and leased a small farm. Fisher's father then worked as a gardener and apiarist, supplementing his income with contract work repairing the machinery at local mines. He died of lung disease in 1887, aged 53.

=== Early political involvement ===
In 1879, aged 17, Fisher was elected secretary of the Crosshouse branch of the Ayrshire Miners' Union. He soon came into contact with Keir Hardie, a leading figure in the union and a future leader of the British Labour Party. The pair met frequently to discuss politics and would renew their acquaintance later in life. Fisher and Hardie were leaders of the 1881 Ayrshire miners' strike, which was widely seen as a failure. The ten-week strike resulted in only a small pay rise rather than the 10 percent that had been asked for; many workers depleted their savings and some cooperatives came close to bankruptcy. Fisher had originally been opposed to the strike, and unsuccessfully attempted to negotiate a compromise with mine-owners. He lost his job, but soon found work at a different mine. Like many miners, Fisher was a supporter of Gladstone's Liberal Party, in particular the "Liberal-Labour" candidates who had the support of the unions. In 1884, he chaired a public meeting in Crosshouse in support of the Third Reform Bill. He subsequently wrote a letter to Gladstone and received a reply thanking him for his support. The following year, Fisher was involved in another miners' strike. He was not only sacked but also blacklisted. He was left with little future in Scotland and decided to emigrate; his older brother John had already left for England a few years earlier, becoming a police constable in Liverpool.

== Immigration to Australia ==
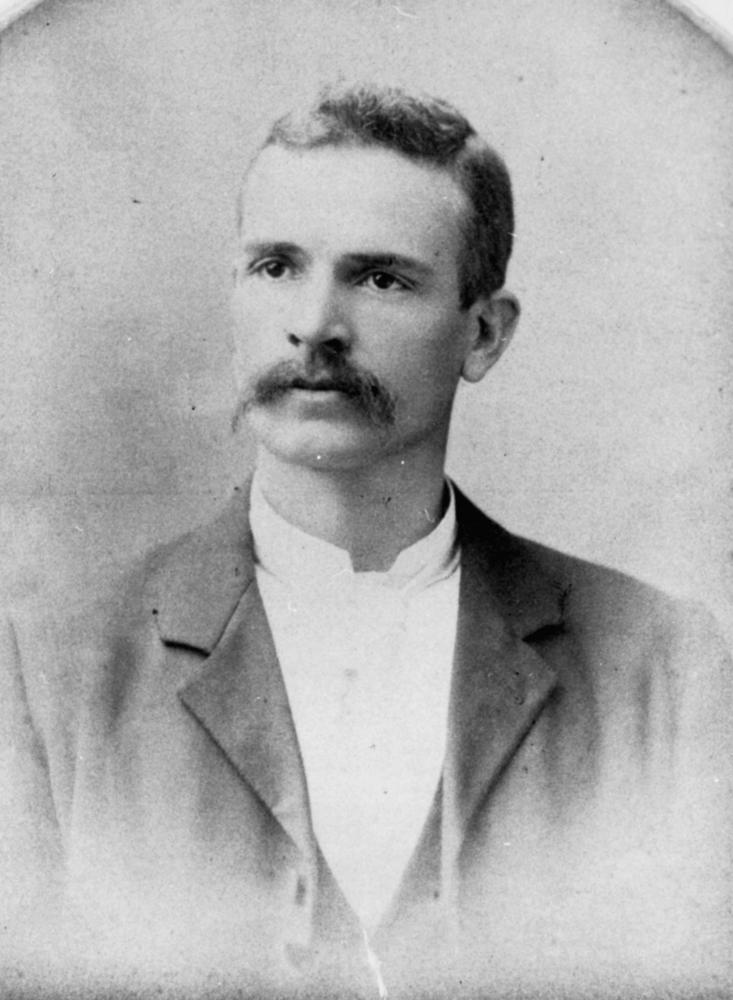
Fisher as a young man in Queensland

Fisher and his younger brother James arrived in Brisbane, Queensland, on 17 August 1885, after a two-month steamship journey from London. He first saw Australia during a stopover at Thursday Island, where whites were a minority and there was a large Japanese population. His biographer David Day has speculated that this initial first impression may have contributed to his later opposition to non-white immigration. Fisher's path to Australia was virtually identical to that of Billy Hughes, who had arrived less than a year earlier in December 1884 – both men took assisted passage, arrived at the age of 22, and travelled from London to Brisbane. Unlike Hughes, Fisher never lost his original accent and retained a thick Scottish "brogue" for the rest of his life.

After arriving in Brisbane, Fisher made his way to the Burrum River coalfields where there were already a number of Scottish miners. He began as an ordinary miner and joined the local miners' union, but after successfully sinking a new shaft at Torbanlea, he was employed as a mine manager. Prospering financially for the first time in his life, he built a timber cottage at Howard and began investing in shares. Fisher moved to the larger gold-mining town of Gympie in 1888, initially working in the No. 1 North Phoenix mine and then in the South Great Eastern Extended. He continued his involvement in unionism, helping form the Gympie branch of the Amalgamated Miners' Association (AMA) and serving terms as secretary and president. He obtained an engine-driver's certificate in 1891, and was elected president of the related craft union. This new job allowed him to work above-ground, operating the machinery that raised and lowered the cages in the mineshaft. During his time in Gympie, Fisher stayed in a boardinghouse in Red Hill; it is now heritage-listed as "Andrew Fisher's Cottage". He would eventually marry his landlady's daughter, Margaret Irvine.

Within years of arriving in the town, Fisher had become "an important figure in the Gympie labour movement, straddling both its political and industrial wings". He was a founding member of the Gympie cooperative, and in 1891 became the secretary of the Gympie Joint Labour Committee, the local labour council. He helped establish a branch of the Workers' Political Association, the forerunner of the Labor Party, and was the inaugural branch president with George Ryland as secretary. In 1892, he represented Gympie at the Labour-in-Politics Convention in Brisbane. He was sacked from his engine-driving job in the same year, and subsequently devoted his full attention to politics.

== Queensland politics ==
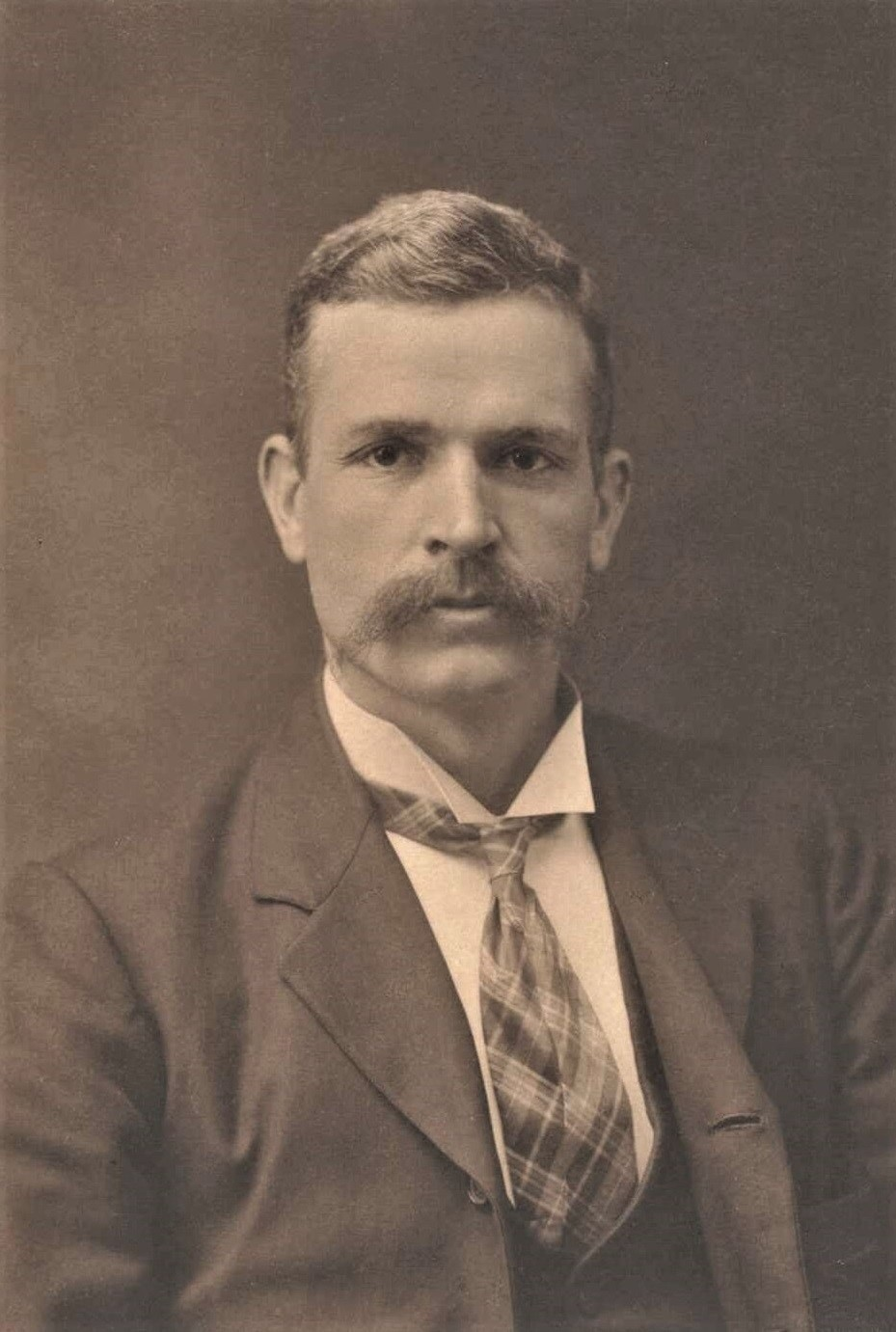
Fisher as a Queensland MP, c. 1899

In 1891, Fisher was elected as the first president of the Gympie branch of the Labour Party. In 1893, he was elected to the Legislative Assembly of Queensland as Labour member for the Electoral district of Gympie and by the following year had become Labour's deputy leader in the Legislative Assembly. In his maiden speech, he pushed for a 50% decrease in military spending and declared support for a federation. He was also active in the Amalgamated Miners Union, becoming President of the Gympie branch by 1891. Another policy area that captured his attention during this term, was the employment of workers from the Pacific Islands in sugar plantations, a practice that Fisher and Labour both strongly opposed. He lost his seat in 1896 following a campaign in which he was charged by his opponent Jacob Stumm with being a dangerous revolutionary and an anti-Catholic, accusations that were propagated by the newspaper Gympie Times.

The 1896 establishment of the Gympie Truth, a newspaper that he was to partly own, was part of his response. Intended as a medium to broadcast Labour's message, the newspaper played a vital role in Fisher's return to parliament in 1899. This time, he was the beneficiary of a scare campaign, in which conservative candidate Francis Power was consistently painted by the Gympie Truth as being a supporter of black labour and the alleged economic and social ills that accompanied it. In that year he was Secretary for Railways and Public Works in the seven-day government of Anderson Dawson, the first parliamentary Labour government in the world.

== First years in federal politics ==
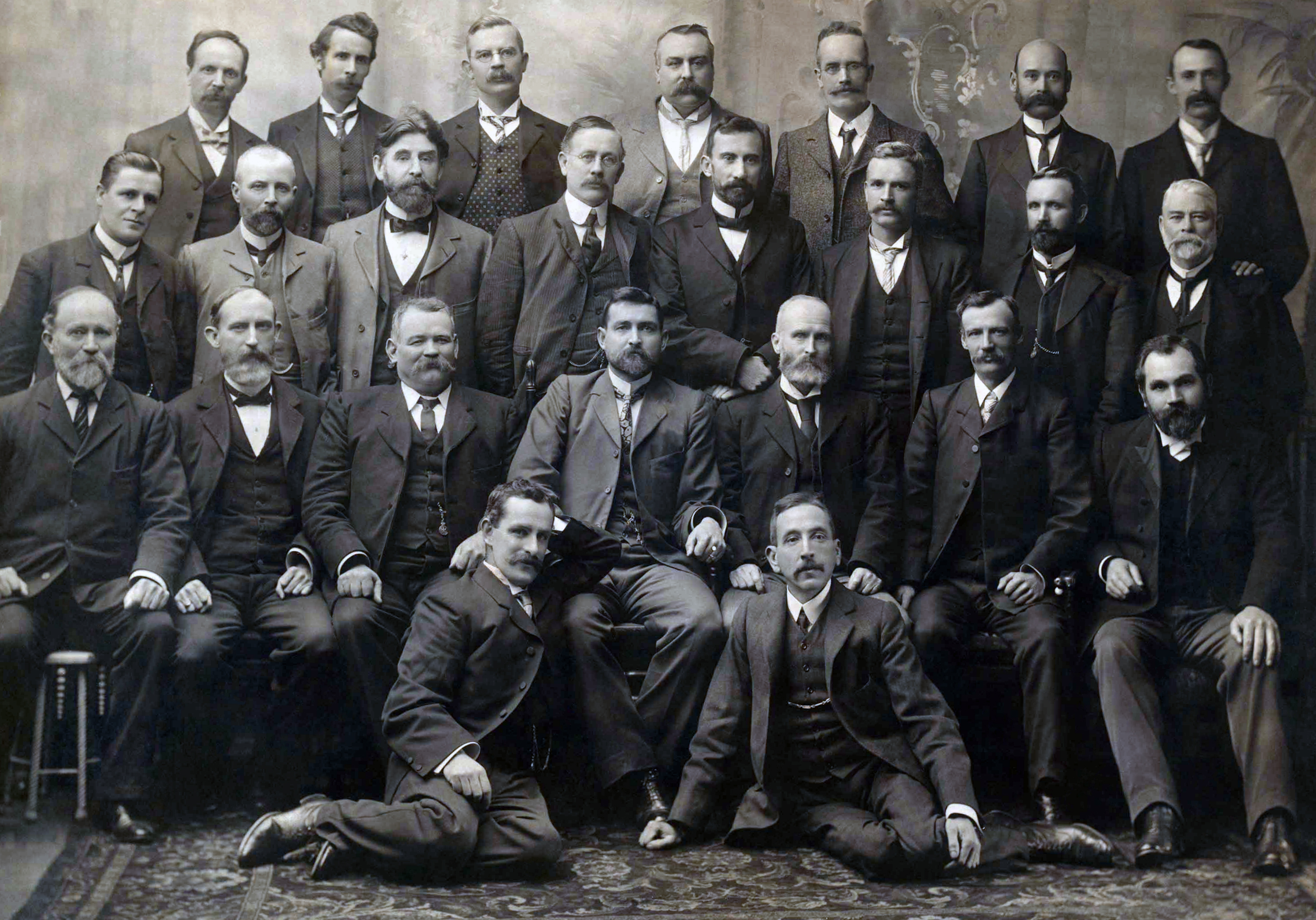
Labour Party MPs elected at the inaugural 1901 election, including Watson, Fisher, Hughes, O'Malley, and Tudor

The state Labour parties and their MPs were mixed in their support for the Federation of Australia. However Fisher was a firm believer in federation, supporting the union of the Australian colonies and campaigned for the 'Yes' vote in Queensland's 1899 referendum. Fisher stood for the Division of Wide Bay at the inaugural 1901 Australian federal election and won the seat, which he held continuously for the rest of his political career. At the end of 1901, Fisher married Margaret Irvine, his previous landlady's daughter.

Fisher supported the White Australia policy but also argued that any Kanaka who had converted to Christianity and married should be allowed to remain in Australia.

Labour improved their position at the 1903 election, gaining enough seats to be on par with the other two, a legislative time colloquially known as the "three elevens". When the Deakin government resigned in 1904, George Reid of the Free Trade Party declined to take office, resulting in Labour taking power and Chris Watson becoming Labour's first prime minister for a four-month period in 1904. Fisher established and demonstrated his ministerial capabilities as Minister for Trade and Customs in the Watson Ministry. The fourth Labour member in the ministry after Watson, Hughes, and Lee Batchelor, Fisher was promoted to Deputy Leader of the Labour Party in 1905.

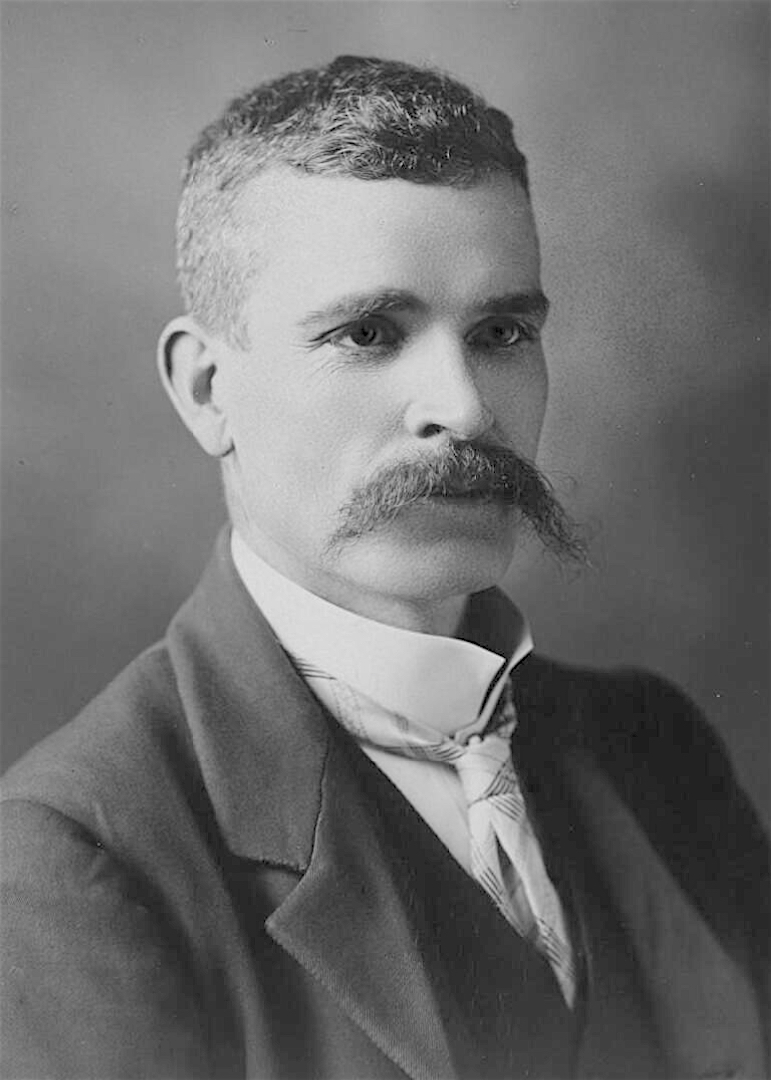
Fisher in 1904, around the time of the Watson government

George Reid adopted a strategy of trying to reorient the party system along Labour vs non-Labour lines – prior to the 1906 election, he renamed his Free Trade Party to the Anti-Socialist Party. Reid envisaged a spectrum running from socialist to anti-socialist, with the Protectionist Party in the middle. This attempt struck a chord with politicians who were steeped in the Westminster tradition and regarded a two-party system as very much the norm.

=== Ascent to party leadership ===
At the 1906 election, Deakin remained prime minister even though Labour gained considerably more seats than the Protectionists. When Watson resigned in 1907, Fisher succeeded him as Labour leader, although Hughes and William Spence also stood for the position. Fisher was considered to have a better understanding of economic matters, was better at handling caucus, had better relations with the party organisation and the unions, and was more in touch with party opinion. He did not share Hughes' passion for free trade or that of Watson and Hughes for defence (and later conscription). In political terms he was a radical, on the left wing of his party, with a strong sense of Labour's part in British working-class history.

At the 1908 Labour Federal Conference, Fisher argued for female representation in parliament:

I trust that not another Federal election will take place without there being a woman endorsed as a Labour candidate for the Senate.

With a majority of seats in the Labour-Protectionist government, Labour caucus by early 1908 had become restive as to the future of the Deakin minority government. With the Deakin ministry in trouble, Deakin spoke to Fisher and Watson about a possible coalition, and following a report agreed to it providing Labour had a majority in cabinet, that there was immediate legislation for old-age pensions, that New Protection was carried and that at the following election the government would promise a progressive land tax. No coalition was formed, however the pressure from Labour brought about productive change by Deakin: he agreed to a royal commission into the post office, old-age pensions were to be provided from the surplus revenue fund and £250,000 set aside for ships for an Australian Navy. New Protection was declared invalid by the High Court in June, Fisher found the tariff proposals of Deakin unsatisfactory, while caucus was also dissatisfied with the old-age pension proposals. Without Labour support the Deakin government collapsed in November 1908.

During the parliamentary ballots that selected Yass-Canberra as the site of the national capital, in October 1908, Fisher voted consistently for Dalgety.

== Prime minister, 1908–1909 ==
=== Appointment and government formation ===
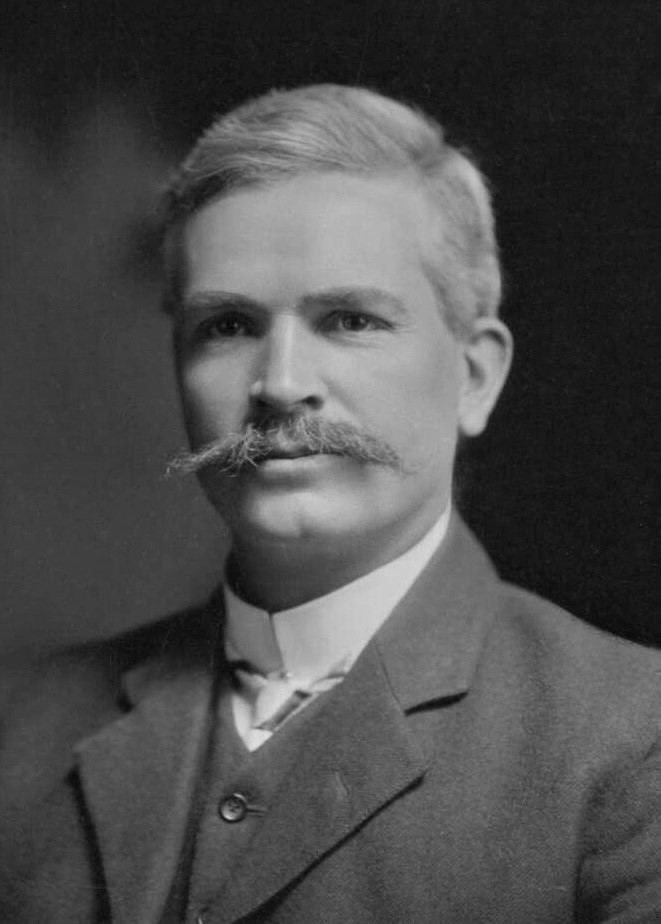
Fisher in 1908

On 5 November 1908, the ALP caucus voted to withdraw its support from the Deakin government, with parliament passing a motion of no confidence on 10 November. Fisher was sworn in as prime minister on 13 November at the head of a minority government, with the support of Deakin and the Protectionists. He also appointed himself treasurer, with the other members of his ministry elected by the ALP caucus and assigned portfolios by Fisher.

=== Legislation and policy agenda ===
Fisher was reliant on the support of other parties to pass legislation, with only 26 seats out of 75 in the House of Representatives and only five senators. He sought to "push on with some of the measures that had been initiated but not completed by Deakin", including passing the Manufacturers' Encouragement Act to provide bounties for iron and steel manufacturers who paid fair and reasonable wages. His aim was to ensure Deakin's continued support to remain in office, buying time to build up public support for the ALP's agenda at the next election. A month after Fisher's appointment, parliament finally passed the Seat of Government Act 1908 to establish Canberra as the site of the new national capital, following years of debate. He had originally favoured Dalgety, New South Wales, as the site for the capital.

Fisher committed Labour to amending the Constitution to give the Commonwealth power over labour, wages and prices, to expanding the navy and providing compulsory military training for youths, to extending pensions, to a land tax, to the construction of a transcontinental railway, to the replacement of pound sterling with Australian currency and to tariffs to protect the sugar industry.

=== Ouster ===
In early 1909, during the parliamentary recess, Deakin and Anti-Socialist Party leader Joseph Cook began negotiations to merge their respective parties and form a single anti-Labor party. Fisher and Deakin simultaneously fell out over Fisher's refusal to recall parliament, which Deakin regarded as a broken promise.

Fisher eventually recalled parliament for 26 May 1909 and presented a throne speech proposed reforms, delivered by Governor-General Lord Dudley. On the same date, the Protectionists and Anti-Socialists agreed to form a united opposition under the leadership of Deakin. The new Liberal Party held a clear majority of seats in both the House and Senate. Fisher did not immediately resign as prime minister, but instead advised Dudley to dissolve parliament and call an early election. Dudley refused, on the grounds that Deakin could form a stable government, and Fisher correspondingly resigned as prime minister on 1 June.

== Prime minister, 1910–1913 ==
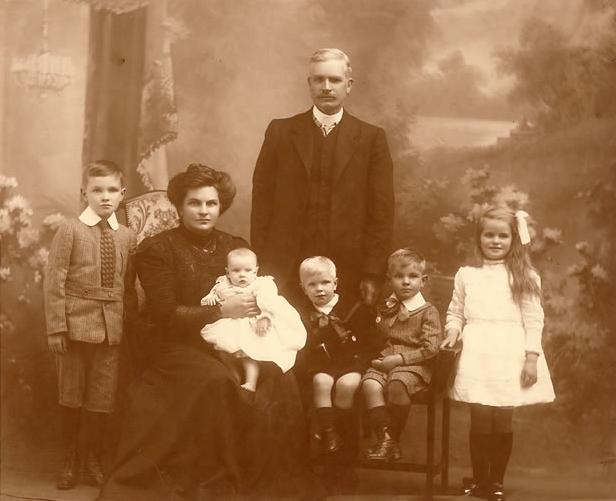
A studio portrait of the prime ministerial family in 1910

At the 1910 election, Labour gained sixteen additional seats to hold a total of forty-two of the seventy-five House of Representatives' seats, and all eighteen Senate seats up for election to hold a total of twenty-two out of thirty-six seats. This gave Labour control of both upper and lower houses and enabled Fisher to form his Second Fisher Ministry, Australia's first elected federal majority government, Australia's first elected Senate majority, and the world's first Labour Party majority government. The 113 acts passed in the three years of the second Fisher government exceeded even the output of the second Deakin government over a similar period.

According to Labor MP and historian Denis Murphy, the second Fisher government represented "the culmination of Labor's involvement in politics", and was "a period of reform unmatched in the Commonwealth until the 1940s", under John Curtin and Ben Chifley. The Fisher government carried out many reforms in defence, finance, transport and communications, and social security, achieving the vast majority of their aims in just three years of government. These included extending old-age and disability pensions, introducing a maternity allowance and issuing Australia's first paper currency, forming the Royal Australian Navy, the start of construction of the Trans-Australian Railway, expanding the bench of the High Court of Australia, the founding of Canberra, and the establishment of the state-owned Commonwealth Bank. Fisher's second government also introduced uniform postal charges throughout Australia, carried out measures to break up land monopolies, put forward proposals for closer regulation of working hours, wages and employment conditions, and amended the 1904 Conciliation and Arbitration Act to provide greater authority for the court president, and to allow for Commonwealth employees' industrial unions, registered with the Arbitration Court.

A land tax, aimed at breaking up big estates and give wider scope for small-scale farming, was also introduced, while coverage of the Arbitration system was extended to agricultural workers, domestics, and federal public servants. In addition, the age at which women became entitled to the old-age pension was lowered from sixty-five to sixty. The introduction of the maternity allowance was a major reform, because it enabled more births to be attended by doctors, thus leading to reductions in infant mortality rates. However, the maternity allowance was only available to white women, with the legislation barring "women who are Asiatic, or are aboriginal natives of Australia, Papua or the Pacific Islands" in line with the racial exclusions in the old-age pension. Compulsory preference to trade unionists in federal employment was also introduced, while the Seaman's Compensation Act 1911 and the Navigation Act 1912 were enacted to improve conditions for those working at sea, together with compensatory arrangements for seamen and next of kin. The Shale Oil Bounties Act of 1910 provided for the encouragement of a certain industry while also providing for (as noted by one study) “the refusal or reduction of a bounty if the production of a commodity is not accompanied by the payment to the workers employed in that production of a fair and reasonable rate of wage.” Eligibility for pensions was also widened. From December 1912 onwards, naturalised residents no longer had to wait three years to be eligible for a pension. That same year, the value of a pensioner's home was excluded from consideration when assessing the value of their property. The Commonwealth Workmens’ Compensation Act, which was introduced in 1912, provided compensation for Commonwealth workers.

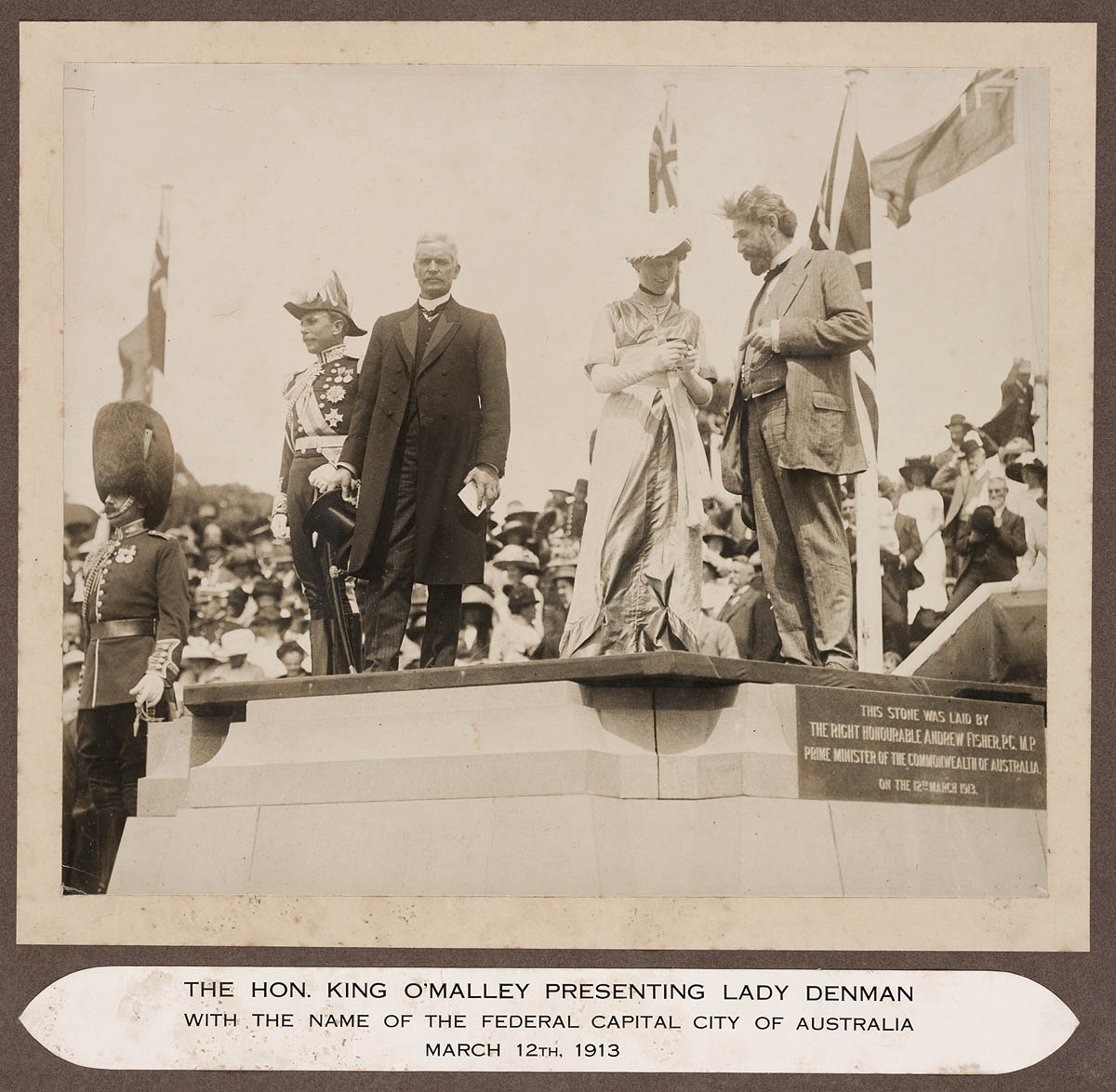
Andrew Fisher at the naming of Canberra ceremony, 1913 (Note: The Governor-General, Lord Denman, is standing to the left of Fisher, while King O'Malley, Minister for Home Affairs, is at the far left of the photo (conversing with Lady Denman who was given the honour of pronouncing the new capital's name for the first time).)

Fisher wanted additional Commonwealth power in certain areas, such as the nationalisation of monopolies. A constitutional referendum was initiated in 1911 which aimed to increase the federal government's legislative powers over trade and commerce and over monopolies. Both questions were defeated, with around 61 per cent voting 'No'. The Fisher government made another attempt, holding a referendum in 1913 which asked for greater federal powers over trade and commerce, corporations, industrial matters, trusts, monopolies, and railway disputes. All six questions were defeated, with around 51 per cent voting 'No'. At the 1913 election, the Commonwealth Liberal Party, led by Joseph Cook, defeated the Labor Party by a single seat.

== Prime minister, 1914–1915 ==
Labor retained control of the Australian Senate despite defeat. In 1914, Cook, frustrated by the Labor-controlled Senate's rejection of his legislation, recommended to the new Governor-General Sir Ronald Munro Ferguson that both houses of the parliament be dissolved and elections called. This was Australia's first double dissolution election, and the only one until the 1951 election. The First World War had broken out in the middle of the 1914 election campaign, with both sides committing Australia to the British Empire. Fisher campaigned on Labor's record of support for an independent Australian defence force, and pledged that Australia would "stand beside the mother country to help and defend her to the last man and the last shilling". Labor won the election with another absolute majority in both houses and Fisher formed his third government on 17 September 1914.

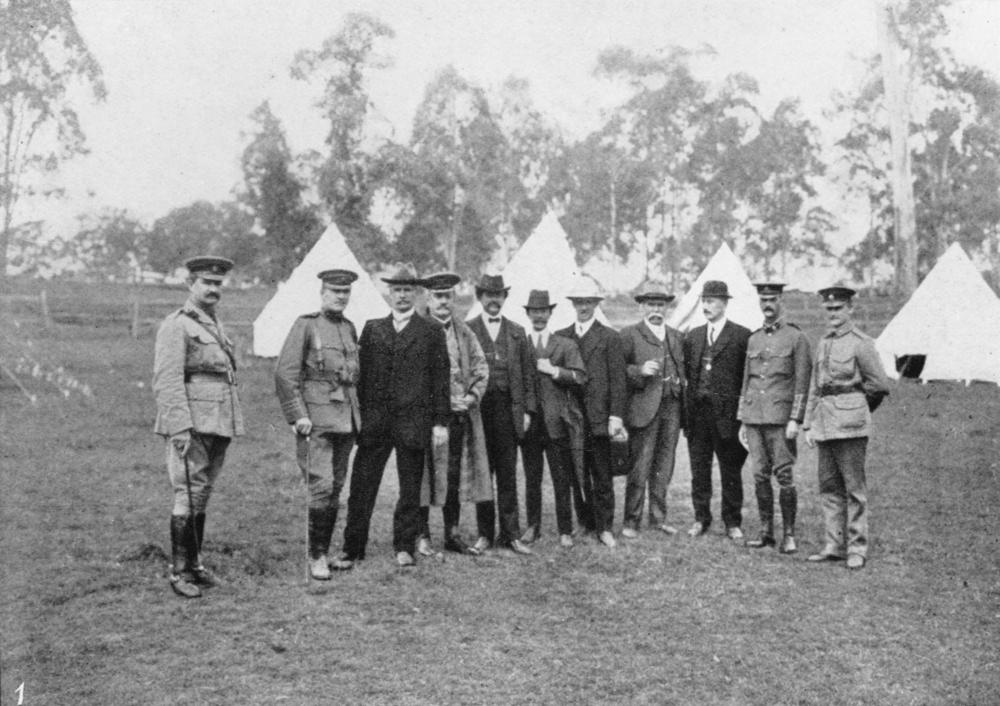
Fisher and his party visit the Army camp in 1914

Fisher and his party were immediately underway in organising urgent defence measures for planning and implementing Australian war effort. Fisher visited New Zealand during this time which saw Billy Hughes serve as acting prime minister for two months. Fisher and Labor continued to implement promised peacetime legislation, including the River Murray Waters Act 1915, the Freight Arrangements Act 1915, the Sugar Purchase Act 1915, the Estate Duty Assessment and the Estate Duty acts in 1914. Wartime legislation in 1914 and 1915 included the War Precautions acts (giving the governor-general power to make regulations for national security), a Trading with the Enemy Act, War Census acts, a Crimes Act, a Belgium Grant Act, and an Enemy Contracts Annulment Act. In December 1914, a War Pensions Act was passed to provide for the grant of Pensions upon the death or incapacity of Members of the Defence Force of the Commonwealth and Members of the Imperial Reserve Forces residents in Australia whose death or incapacity resulted from their employment in connection with warlike operations.

In October 1915, journalist Keith Murdoch reported on the situation in Gallipoli at Fisher's request, and advised him, "Your fears have been justified". He described the Dardanelles Expedition as being "a series of disastrous underestimations" and "one of the most terrible chapters in our history" concluding: "What I want to say to you now very seriously is that the continuous and ghastly bungling over the Dardanelles enterprise was to be expected from such a general staff as the British Army possesses ... the conceit and self complacency of the red feather men are equalled only by their incapacity."

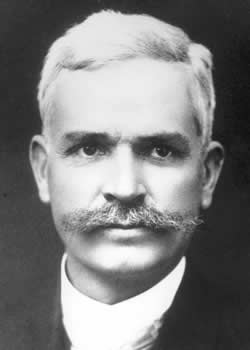
Fisher in 1915

Fisher passed this report on to Hughes and to Defence Minister George Pearce, ultimately leading to the evacuation of the Australian troops in December 1915. The report was also used by the Dardanelles Commission on which Fisher served, while High Commissioner in London.

Fisher resigned as prime minister and from Parliament on 27 October 1915 after being absent from parliament without explanation for three sitting days. Three days later, Labor Caucus unanimously elected Billy Hughes leader of the Federal Parliamentary Party. Fisher's seat was narrowly won by the Commonwealth Liberal Party on a 0.2% margin at the 1915 Wide Bay by-election.

== High Commissioner to the United Kingdom ==
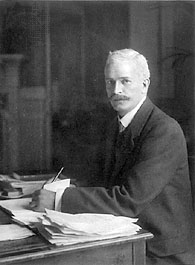
Australia's second High Commissioner to the United Kingdom

Fisher was Australia's second High Commissioner to the United Kingdom from 1 January 1916 until 1 January 1921. Fisher opposed conscription which made his dealings with Billy Hughes difficult. Hughes asked Fisher for support by cable three weeks before the first referendum, but Fisher cabled back "Am unable to sign appeal. Position forbids." He subsequently refused to publicly comment on the issue. Hughes' 1916 referendum on conscription had a No vote of around 52 per cent, while the 1917 referendum had a No vote of around 54 per cent. Fisher visited Australian troops serving in Belgium and France in 1919, and later presented Pearce with an album of battlefield photos from 1917 and 1918, showing the horrendous conditions experienced by the troops.

The Dardanelles Commission, including Fisher, interviewed witnesses in 1916 and 1917 and issued its final report in 1919. It concluded that the expedition was poorly planned and executed and that difficulties had been underestimated, problems which were exacerbated by supply shortages and by personality clashes and procrastination at high levels. Some 480,000 Allied troops had been dedicated to the failed campaign, with around half in casualties. The report's conclusions were regarded as insipid with no figures (political or military) heavily censured. The report of the commission and information gathered by the inquiry remain a key source of documents on the campaign.

== Final years and death ==
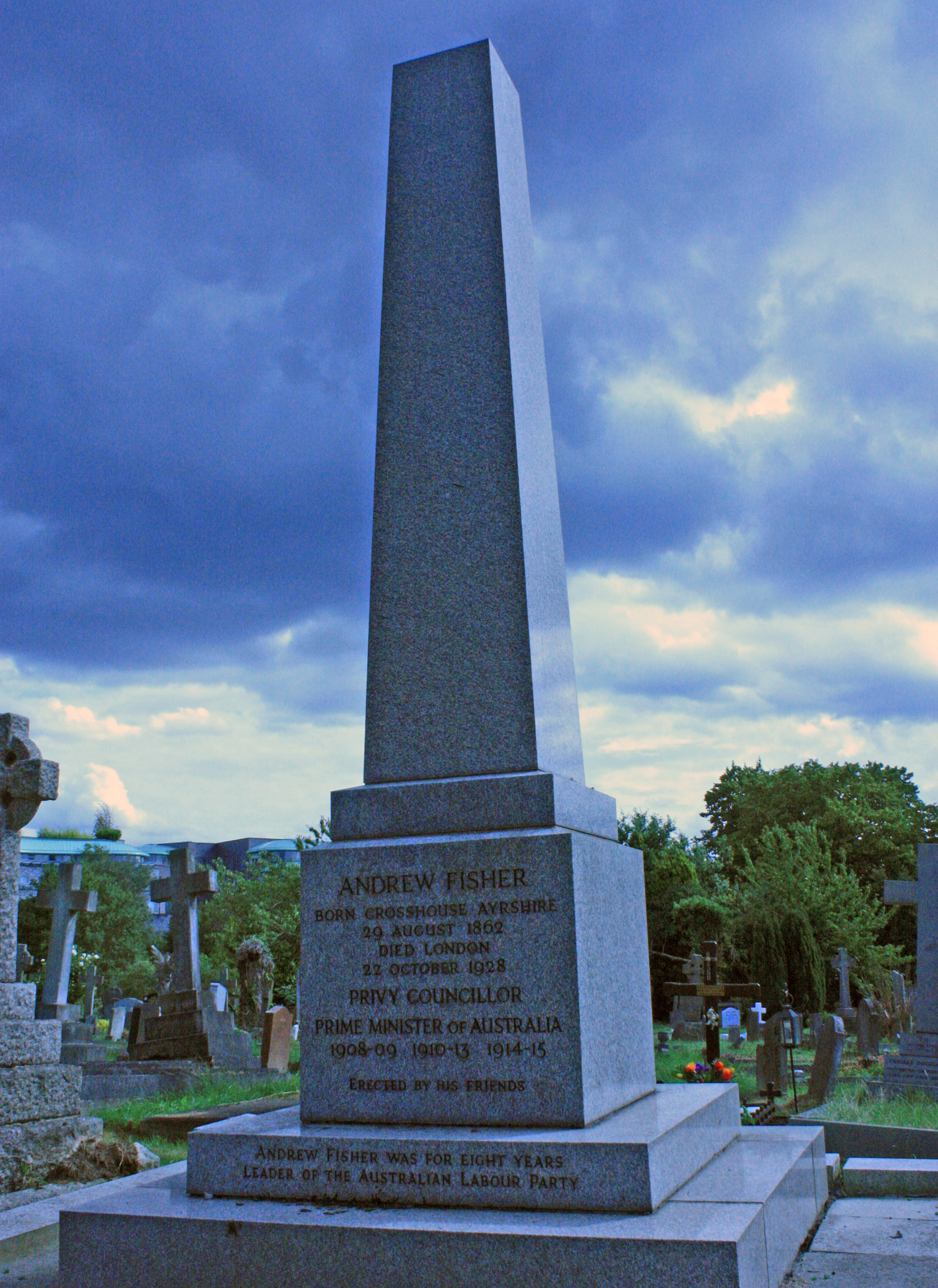
Fisher's grave in Hampstead Cemetery

Fisher's term as High Commissioner officially ended on 22 April 1921, although it concluded with three months' paid leave and he left for Australia on 29 January. He arrived back in Melbourne with no firm plans for his future, but the rapturous receptions he received at labour movement gatherings led him to contemplate a return to active politics. He was the only remaining former prime minister in the Labor Party, which had lost many experienced MPs in the 1916 party split. The party's leader Frank Tudor had had frequent bouts of ill health, and T. J. Ryan, who was widely seen as Tudor's heir apparent, died suddenly of pneumonia in August 1921. Fisher seriously considered standing in the resulting by-election, but found there was no guarantee that the local party would accept him as a candidate. He was unwilling to actively campaign for preselection, and decided he would only stand if he were drafted, which did not happen.

With little else to keep them in Australia, Fisher and his wife decided to return to London to be closer to their children. They rented a property in Highgate for a period, and then in October 1922 bought a home on South Hill Park near Hampstead Heath. He explored the possibility of standing for the British House of Commons, but eventually opted for a permanent retirement from politics. By the time he was 60, Fisher's family and friends had begun to notice a decline in his mental faculties, which was probably a form of early-onset dementia. It was judged unsafe for him to be out alone in public, and in 1925 his assets were placed in trust. By 1928, he was unable to sign his own name, and his children were seriously considering having him institutionalised. Fisher contracted a severe case of influenza in September 1928, and eventually died from complications of the disease on 22 October, aged 66. He is one of only three Australian prime ministers to die overseas, and he and George Reid are the only ones who both began and ended their lives outside Australia.

Fisher was buried at Hampstead Cemetery on 26 October 1928. On the same day, a memorial service was held at St Columba's Church, London, which was attended by representatives of King George V and Prime Minister Stanley Baldwin, as well as Arthur Henderson representing the British Labour Party. In February 1930, Prime Minister Ramsay MacDonald unveiled a granite obelisk above Fisher's grave. His widow eventually moved back to Australia, dying there in 1958.

== Evaluation ==
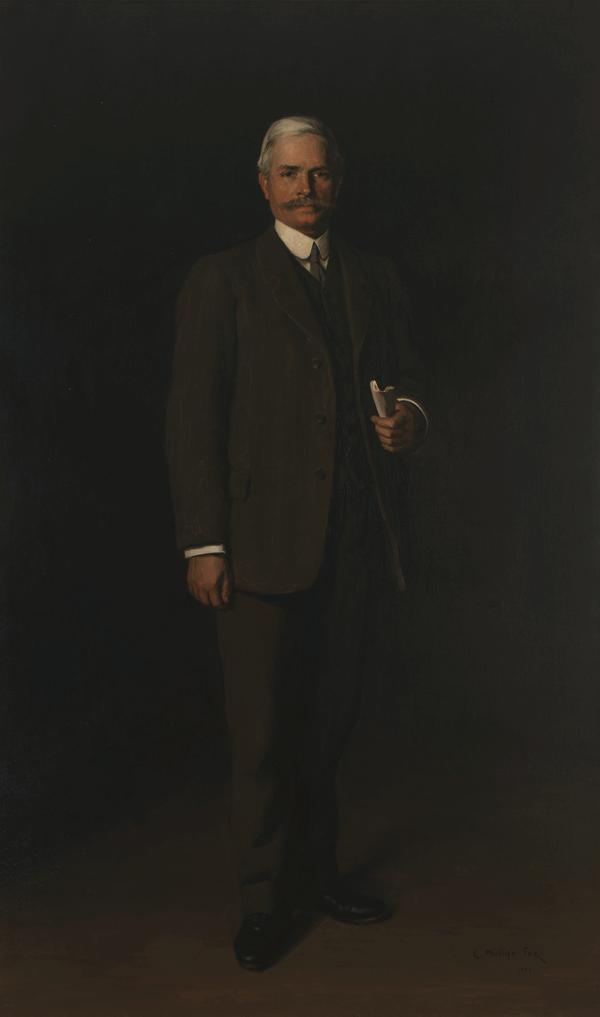
Parliament House portrait of Fisher by E. Phillips Fox, 1913

Despite the length of Fisher's service as prime minister, for many years he and his government were given relatively little scholarly attention. His decision to retire to England placed him out of the public eye, while his mental deterioration and early death deprived him of the opportunity to dictate his own legacy. Writers interested in the post-Federation era did not generally view him as an attractive biographical subject, which has been attributed to the relative orthodoxy of his political views and a reputation for propriety to the point of dullness. Fisher's 1981 entry in the Australian Dictionary of Biography was written by Denis Murphy, who had planned a full-length biography but died in 1984 before completing it. Clem Lloyd also began a biography in the 1990s, which was unfinished at the time of his death in 2001. The first complete biographies of Fisher did not emerge until the 100th anniversary of his prime ministership. These were David Day's Andrew Fisher: Prime Minister of Australia (2008) and Peter Bastian's Andrew Fisher: An Underestimated Man (2009), as well as a shorter volume by Edward Humphreys, Andrew Fisher: The Forgotten Man (2008).

Obituarists of Fisher generally emphasised his modesty, integrity, and dedication to the labour movement. Writing for The Australian Worker, Henry Ernest Boote praised him as "loyal to his class, courageous in the advocacy of their cause, and absolutely incorruptible". In the decades after his death, a general view emerged of Fisher as a competent rather than brilliant leader. He was praised for successfully managing the conflicting personalities within his own party, but as a leader of his country was often compared unfavourably with Deakin and Hughes. In general, his prime ministership was seen as a relatively inconsequential interlude. However, beginning in the 1970s a different view of Fisher began to emerge, which coincided with more of his personal papers becoming available to researchers. His more recent biographers have credited Fisher with establishing Labor as a viable party of government and demonstrating that the party's platform did not have to be sacrificed for political expediency, and argued that he deserves the primary credit for the political and electoral accomplishments of his governments. He is now generally seen as one of the most significant figures in the early years of his party.

== Honours ==
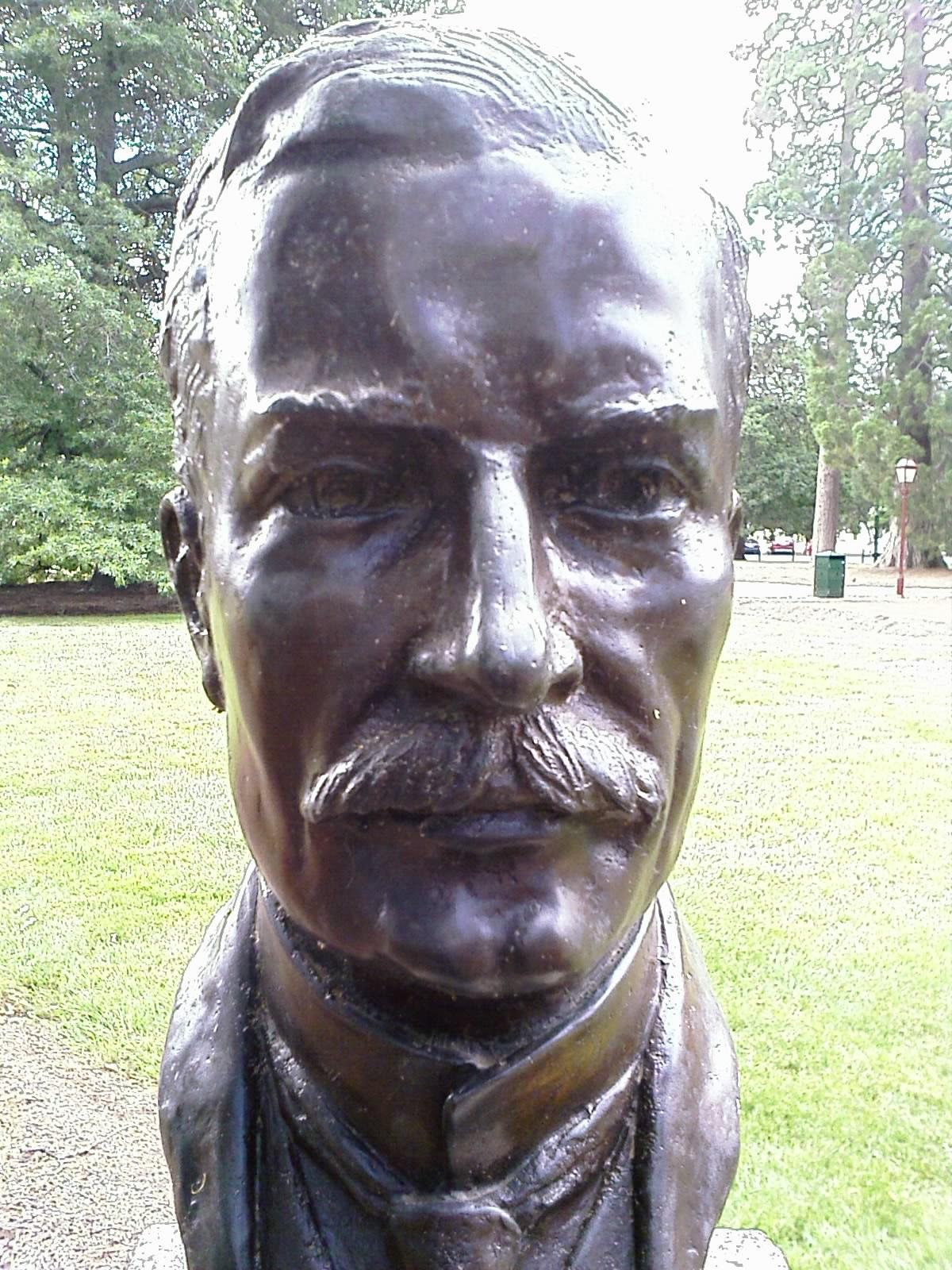
Bust of Andrew Fisher by sculptor Wallace Anderson located in the Prime Ministers Avenue in the Ballarat Botanical Gardens

At the end of the First World War, France awarded him the Légion d'honneur, but he declined it; he did not like decorations of any kind and adhered to this view throughout his life. In 1911 Fisher declined the offer of honorary degrees from the universities of Oxford, Cambridge, Glasgow and Birmingham, although he did accept the Freedom of the City from the cities of Glasgow, Edinburgh and Bristol.

Another honour Fisher did accept was appointment to the Privy Council of the United Kingdom on his visit to the UK in 1911 for the Coronation of King George V and the Imperial Conference at the same time as New Zealand prime minister Sir Joseph Ward and Governor Lord Islington, granting him use of "The Right Honourable". Public reaction to his appointment was positive, with the Brisbane Truth noting it would not change his humble nature: "To plain Andrew Fisher, who lately refused to-be decorated with empty, unearned University degrees, a Privy Councillorship has been awarded. This is an honor to which our Prime Minister is justly entitled by reason of his inclusion in the secret councils of the Imperial Conference, which secrets include the private advice, tendered by him to the administrators of and in the administration of his Majesty's Imperial Government." Although admitted as a Privy Counsellor in absentia on 6 July 1911, it wasn't until 14 February 1916 when he was High Commissioner in London that he formally took his oath of office.

The federal electorate of Fisher was named after him. A Canberra suburb, Fisher, was also created in his memory, with its streets reflecting a mining theme in honour of Fisher's occupation before entering public life. Ramsay MacDonald, Britain's first Labour Prime Minister, unveiled a memorial to Fisher in Hampstead Cemetery in 1930. A memorial garden was also dedicated to Fisher at his birthplace in the late 1970s.

In 1972 he was honoured on a postage stamp bearing his portrait issued by Australia Post. In 1992, his home in Gympie (Andrew Fisher's Cottage) was listed on the Queensland Heritage Register. In 2008, Labor Prime Minister Kevin Rudd, a fellow Queenslander, launched a biography titled Andrew Fisher, written by David Day. In turn, Rudd was presented with an item that once belonged to Fisher – a slightly battered gold pen engraved with Fisher's signature, which had been held in safekeeping for 80 years.

== See also ==
- First Fisher Ministry
- Second Fisher Ministry
- Third Fisher Ministry

== Bibliography ==
- Anderson, W. K. (2001). "Andrew Fisher: 'a proud, honest man of Scotland'". Journal of the Royal Australian Historical Society. 87 (2): 189–208.
- Attard, Bernard (1995). "Andrew Fisher, the High Commissionership and the Collapse of Labor". Labour History (68). Liverpool University Press: 115–131. doi:10.2307/27516357. JSTOR 27516357.
- Bastian, Peter (2009). Andrew Fisher: An Underestimated Man. UNSW Press. ISBN 9781742231822. online
- Day, David (2008). Andrew Fisher: Prime Minister of Australia. HarperCollins. ISBN 9780732276102.
- Grattan, Michelle (2013). Australian Prime Ministers (Revised and updated ed.). Chatswood, N.S.W.: New Holland Publishers. ISBN 978-1-74257-429-5.
- Dyrenfurth, Nick. Heroes and Villains: The Rise and Fall of the Early Australian Labor Party, (Australian Scholarly Publishing, 2011).
- Hawkins, John (2008). "Andrew Fisher: a reforming treasurer" (PDF). Economic Roundup (2). Department of the Treasury: 105–114.
- Hearn, Mark, and Nick Dyrenfurth. "Reinterpreting the second Fisher government." Labour History: A Journal of Labour and Social History 102 (2012): 1–10.
- Hughes, Colin A. (1976). "Chapter 6". Mr Prime Minister. Australian Prime Ministers 1901–1972. Melbourne, Victoria: Oxford University Press. ISBN 0-19-550471-2.
- Humphreys, Edward W. (2008). Andrew Fisher: The Forgotten Man. Sports and Editorial Services Australia. ISBN 9780975197059.
- Murdoch, John R. M. (1998). A Million to One Against: A Portrait of Andrew Fisher. Minerva. ISBN 0754101398.
- Murphy, D.J. "Fisher, Andrew (1862-1928)", Australian Dictionary of Biography
- Sawer, Marian. "Andrew Fisher and the Era of Liberal Reform" Labour History, No. 102 (May 2012), pp. 71–86 online

Parliament of Queensland
Preceded by Mathew Mellor	Member for Gympie; 1893–1896; Served alongside: William Smyth	Succeeded by Jacob Stumm
Preceded by Jacob Stumm	Member for Gympie; 1899–1901; Served alongside: George Ryland	Succeeded by Daniel Mulcahy
Parliament of Australia
New division	Member for Wide Bay; 1901–1915	Succeeded by Edward Corser
Political offices
Preceded by William Lyne	Minister for Trade and Customs; 1904	Succeeded by Allan McLean
Preceded by Alfred Deakin	Prime Minister of Australia; 1908–1909	Succeeded by Alfred Deakin
Preceded by Sir William Lyne	Treasurer of Australia; 1908–1909	Succeeded by Sir John Forrest
Preceded by Alfred Deakin	Prime Minister of Australia; 1910–1913	Succeeded by Joseph Cook
Preceded by Sir John Forrest	Treasurer of Australia; 1910–1913	Succeeded by Sir John Forrest
Preceded by Joseph Cook	Prime Minister of Australia; 1914–1915	Succeeded by Billy Hughes
Preceded by Sir John Forrest	Treasurer of Australia; 1914–1915	Succeeded by William Higgs
Party political offices
Preceded by Chris Watson	Leader of the Australian Labor Party; 1907–1915	Succeeded by Billy Hughes
Diplomatic posts
Preceded by Sir George Reid	Australian High Commissioner to the United Kingdom; 1916–1920	Succeeded by Sir Joseph Cook
