= 1910 Australian House of Representatives election =

Australian federal election, 13 April 1910 House of Representatives << 1906–1913 >>
Enrolled voters	2,258,482				
Votes cast	1,349,626		Turnout	59.52	+12.04
Informal votes	27,144		Informal	2.01	–2.97
Summary of votes by party
Party	Primary votes	%	Swing	Seats	Change
Labour	660,864	49.12%	+12.48%	42	+16
Liberal	591,248	44.71%	–8.01%	31	–11
Socialist Labor	628	0.05%	+0.05%	0	±0
Young Australia	590	0.04%	+0.04%	0	±0
Independent	80,478	6.09%	−2.22%	2	−3
Total	1,322,482			75	

This is a list of electoral division results for the Australian 1910 federal election.

== New South Wales ==
1910 Australian federal election (New South Wales)
← 1906	13 April 1910	1913 →

All 27 New South Wales seats in the House of Representatives
- Registered: 843,662
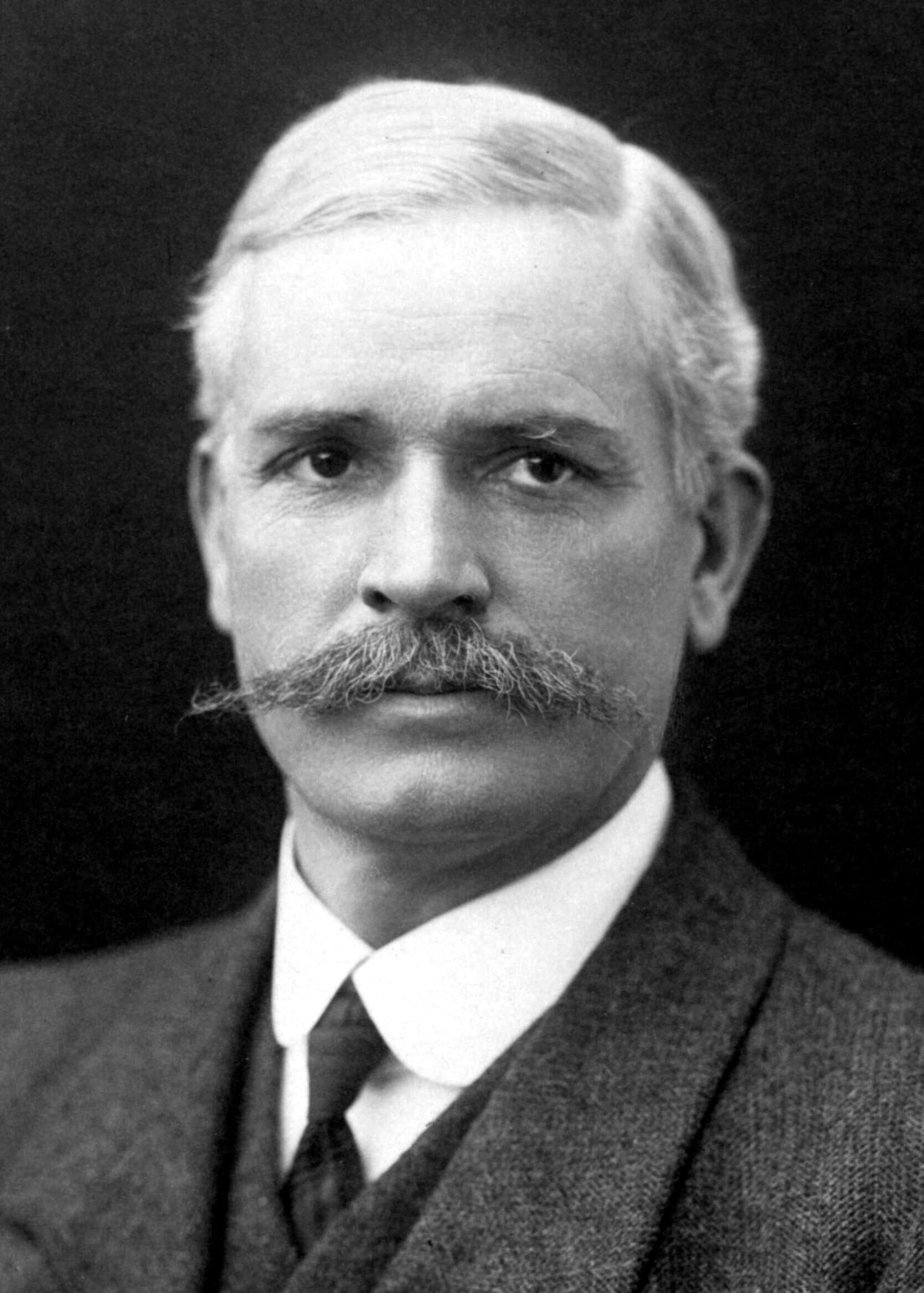

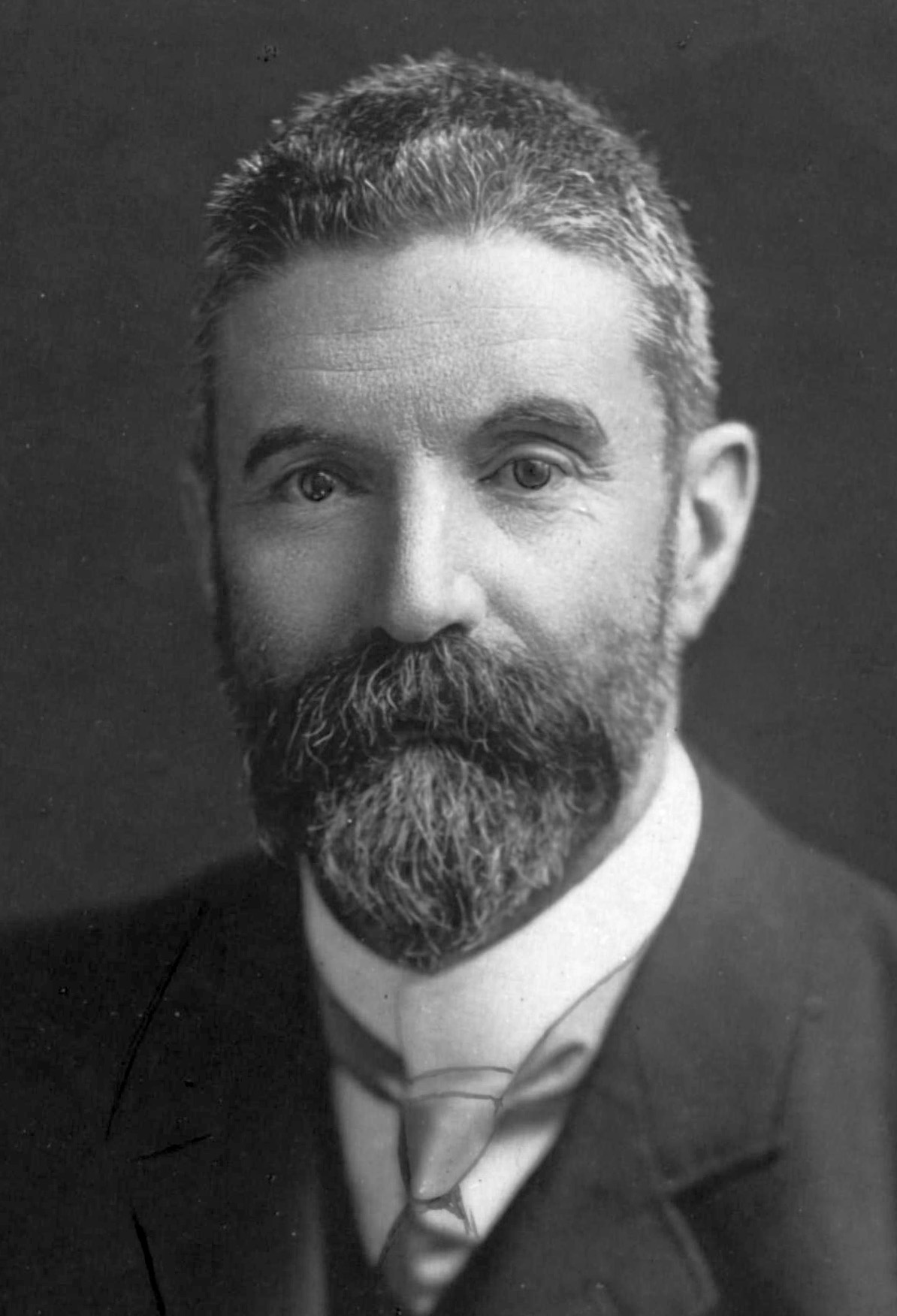
	First party	Second party
Leader	Andrew Fisher	Alfred Deakin
Party	Labour	Liberal
Last election	11 seats	16 seats
Seats won	17	9
Seat change	▲6	▼7
Popular vote	252,194	216,866
Percentage	51.06%	43.91%
Swing	▲12.56	▼21.20

=== Barrier ===
1910 Australian federal election: Barrier
Party	Candidate	Votes	%	±%
Labour	Josiah Thomas	9,447	85.8	+11.3
Liberal	William Shepherd	1,562	14.2	−11.3
Total formal votes		11,009	98.5	
Informal votes		166	1.5	
Turnout		11,175	52.9	
Labour hold		Swing	+11.3	

=== Calare ===
1910 Australian federal election: Calare
Party	Candidate	Votes	%	±%
Labour	Thomas Brown	10,561	53.6	+2.9
Liberal	Henry Pigott	9,147	46.4	−2.9
Total formal votes		19,708	98.0	
Informal votes		394	2.0	
Turnout		20,102	67.2	
Labour hold		Swing	+2.9	

=== Cook ===
1910 Australian federal election: Cook
Party	Candidate	Votes	%	±%
Labour	James Catts	14,021	64.1	+11.1
Liberal	William Clegg	7,856	35.9	−11.1
Total formal votes		21,877	98.6	
Informal votes		319	1.4	
Turnout		22,196	65.7	
Labour hold		Swing	+11.1	

=== Cowper ===
1910 Australian federal election: Cowper
Party	Candidate	Votes	%	±%
Liberal	John Thomson	8,686	67.9	−16.6
Labour	Clem Johnson	3,692	28.9	+25.3
Independent Labour	John O'Brien	418	3.3	+3.3
Total formal votes		12,796	97.6	
Informal votes		313	2.4	
Turnout		13,109	40.6	
Liberal hold		Swing	−30.5	

=== Dalley ===
1910 Australian federal election: Dalley
Party	Candidate	Votes	%	±%
Labour	Robert Howe	14,610	56.6	+9.3
Liberal	William Wilks	11,215	43.4	−9.3
Total formal votes		25,825	98.8	
Informal votes		318	1.2	
Turnout		26,143	74.9	
Labour gain from Liberal		Swing	+9.3	

=== Darling ===
1910 Australian federal election: Darling
Party	Candidate	Votes	%	±%
Labour	William Spence	9,551	64.7	+6.8
Liberal	James Carroll	5,222	35.3	−6.8
Total formal votes		14,773	96.8	
Informal votes		493	3.2	
Turnout		15,266	54.8	
Labour hold		Swing	+6.8	

=== East Sydney ===
1910 Australian federal election: East Sydney
Party	Candidate	Votes	%	±%
Labour	John West	10,487	57.1	+12.0
Liberal	Samuel Lees	7,890	42.9	−12.0
Total formal votes		18,377	99.0	
Informal votes		181	1.0	
Turnout		18,558	58.9	
Labour gain from Liberal		Swing	+12.0	

=== Eden-Monaro ===
1910 Australian federal election: Eden-Monaro
Party	Candidate	Votes	%	±%
Liberal	Austin Chapman	unopposed		
Liberal hold		Swing		

=== Gwydir ===
1910 Australian federal election: Gwydir
Party	Candidate	Votes	%	±%
Labour	William Webster	10,729	59.6	+6.3
Liberal	Robert Patten	7,160	40.4	−6.3
Total formal votes		17,729	98.3	
Informal votes		311	1.7	
Turnout		18,040	59.9	
Labour hold		Swing	+6.3	

=== Hume ===
1910 Australian federal election: Hume
Party	Candidate	Votes	%	±%
Independent	Sir William Lyne	9,322	66.4	+66.4
Liberal	Bernard Grogan	4,708	33.6	−66.4
Total formal votes		14,030	98.2	
Informal votes		251	1.8	
Turnout		14,281	55.6	
Independent gain from Liberal		Swing	+66.4	

=== Hunter ===
1910 Australian federal election: Hunter
Party	Candidate	Votes	%	±%
Labour	Matthew Charlton	14,803	60.9	+11.7
Liberal	Frank Liddell	9,523	39.1	−11.7
Total formal votes		24,326	98.5	
Informal votes		373	1.5	
Turnout		24,699	69.3	
Labour gain from Liberal		Swing	+11.7	

=== Illawarra ===
1910 Australian federal election: Illawarra
Party	Candidate	Votes	%	±%
Liberal	George Fuller	9,763	52.0	−11.8
Labour	George Burns	9,025	48.0	+11.8
Total formal votes		18,788	98.9	
Informal votes		202	1.1	
Turnout		18,990	68.7	
Liberal hold		Swing	+8.5	

=== Lang ===
1910 Australian federal election: Lang
Party	Candidate	Votes	%	±%
Liberal	Elliot Johnson	12,921	51.0	−19.4
Labour	Thomas Crawford	12,402	49.0	+19.4
Total formal votes		25,325	98.9	
Informal votes		285	1.1	
Turnout		25,608	68.4	
Liberal hold		Swing	−19.4	

=== Macquarie ===
1910 Australian federal election: Macquarie
Party	Candidate	Votes	%	±%
Labour	Ernest Carr	9,875	56.5	+5.2
Liberal	Alfred Conroy	7,618	43.5	−5.2
Total formal votes		17,493	98.6	
Informal votes		248	1.4	
Turnout		17,741	70.2	
Labour hold		Swing	+5.2	

=== Nepean ===
1910 Australian federal election: Nepean
Party	Candidate	Votes	%	±%
Labour	George Cann	11,113	51.5	+17.5
Liberal	Eric Bowden	10,461	48.5	−12.1
Total formal votes		21,574	98.3	
Informal votes		376	1.7	
Turnout		21,950	62.3	
Labour gain from Liberal		Swing	+14.8	

=== Newcastle ===
1910 Australian federal election: Newcastle
Party	Candidate	Votes	%	±%
Labour	David Watkins	15,920	76.7	+9.5
Liberal	Frank Pulsford	4,825	23.3	−9.5
Total formal votes		20,745	99.1	
Informal votes		194	0.9	
Turnout		20,939	66.7	
Labour hold		Swing	+9.5	

=== New England ===
1910 Australian federal election: New England
Party	Candidate	Votes	%	±%
Labour	Frank Foster	9,622	52.7	+0.9
Liberal	William Fleming	8,637	47.3	−0.9
Total formal votes		18,259	96.8	
Informal votes		407	2.2	
Turnout		18,666	61.2	
Labour hold		Swing	+0.9	

=== North Sydney ===
1910 Australian federal election: North Sydney
Party	Candidate	Votes	%	±%
Liberal	George Edwards	15,233	65.2	−34.8
Labour	Percy Tighe	7,850	33.6	+33.6
Young Australia	John Steel	294	1.3	+1.3
Total formal votes		23,377	98.7	
Informal votes		300	1.3	
Turnout		23,677	61.5	
Liberal hold		Swing	−33.6	

=== Parkes ===
1910 Australian federal election: Parkes
Party	Candidate	Votes	%	±%
Liberal	Bruce Smith	11,342	45.0	−33.2
Labour	Ernest Burgess	8,776	34.8	+34.8
Independent Liberal	Herbert Pratten	5,009	20.2	+20.2
Total formal votes		25,217	99.0	
Informal votes		262	1.0	
Turnout		25,479	67.9	
Liberal hold		Swing	−23.1	

=== Parramatta ===
1910 Australian federal election: Parramatta
Party	Candidate	Votes	%	±%
Liberal	Joseph Cook	11,881	68.0	−32.0
Labour	Bert Broue	5,579	32.0	+32.0
Total formal votes		17,460	98.0	
Informal votes		359	2.0	
Turnout		17,819	54.5	
Liberal hold		Swing	−32.0	

=== Richmond ===
1910 Australian federal election: Richmond
Party	Candidate	Votes	%	±%
Liberal	Walter Massy-Greene	6,843	37.3	−62.7
Independent Labour	Robert Pyers	5,319	29.0	+29.0
Independent Liberal	Venour Nathan	3,311	18.1	+18.1
Labour	William Gillies	2,858	15.6	+15.6
Total formal votes		18,331	98.4	
Informal votes		303	1.6	
Turnout		18,634	59.4	
Liberal hold		Swing	−62.7	

=== Riverina ===
1910 Australian federal election: Riverina
Party	Candidate	Votes	%	±%
Labour	John Chanter	9,274	57.0	+57.0
Liberal	John Jackson	6,520	40.1	−59.9
Independent Liberal	Edmund O'Dwyer	464	2.9	+2.9
Total formal votes		16,258	97.8	
Informal votes		360	2.2	
Turnout		16,618	58.9	
Labour gain from Liberal		Swing	+57.0	

=== Robertson ===
1910 Australian federal election: Robertson
Party	Candidate	Votes	%	±%
Labour	William Johnson	7,957	50.9	+7.9
Liberal	Henry Willis	7,681	49.1	−7.9
Total formal votes		15,638	98.0	
Informal votes		321	2.0	
Turnout		15,959	57.8	
Labour gain from Liberal		Swing	+7.9	

=== South Sydney ===
1910 Australian federal election: South Sydney
Party	Candidate	Votes	%	±%
Labour	Edward Riley	12,875	74.1	+17.7
Liberal	Eden George	4,509	25.9	−17.7
Total formal votes		17,384	98.0	
Informal votes		361	2.0	
Turnout		17,745	56.6	
Labour hold		Swing	+17.7	

=== Wentworth ===
1910 Australian federal election: Wentworth
Party	Candidate	Votes	%	±%
Liberal	Willie Kelly	11,641	61.0	−12.2
Labour	Arthur Vernon	7,451	39.0	+12.2
Total formal votes		19,092	98.7	
Informal votes		257	1.3	
Turnout		19,349	53.8	
Liberal hold		Swing	−12.2	

=== Werriwa ===
1910 Australian federal election: Werriwa
Party	Candidate	Votes	%	±%
Labour	David Hall	10,876	54.6	+2.8
Liberal	Granville Ryrie	9,036	45.4	−2.8
Total formal votes		19,912	98.5	
Informal votes		307	1.5	
Turnout		20,219	75.1	
Labour hold		Swing	+2.8	

=== West Sydney ===
1910 Australian federal election: West Sydney
Party	Candidate	Votes	%	±%
Labour	Billy Hughes	13,000	69.8	+14.3
Liberal	Stanley Cole	4,986	26.8	−17.7
Socialist Labor	Harry Holland	628	3.4	+3.4
Total formal votes		18,614	98.2	
Informal votes		341	1.8	
Turnout		18,955	60.7	
Labour hold		Swing	+16.0	

== Victoria ==
1910 Australian federal election (Victoria)
← 1906	13 April 1910	1913 →

All 22 Victorian seats in the House of Representatives
- Registered: 703,699
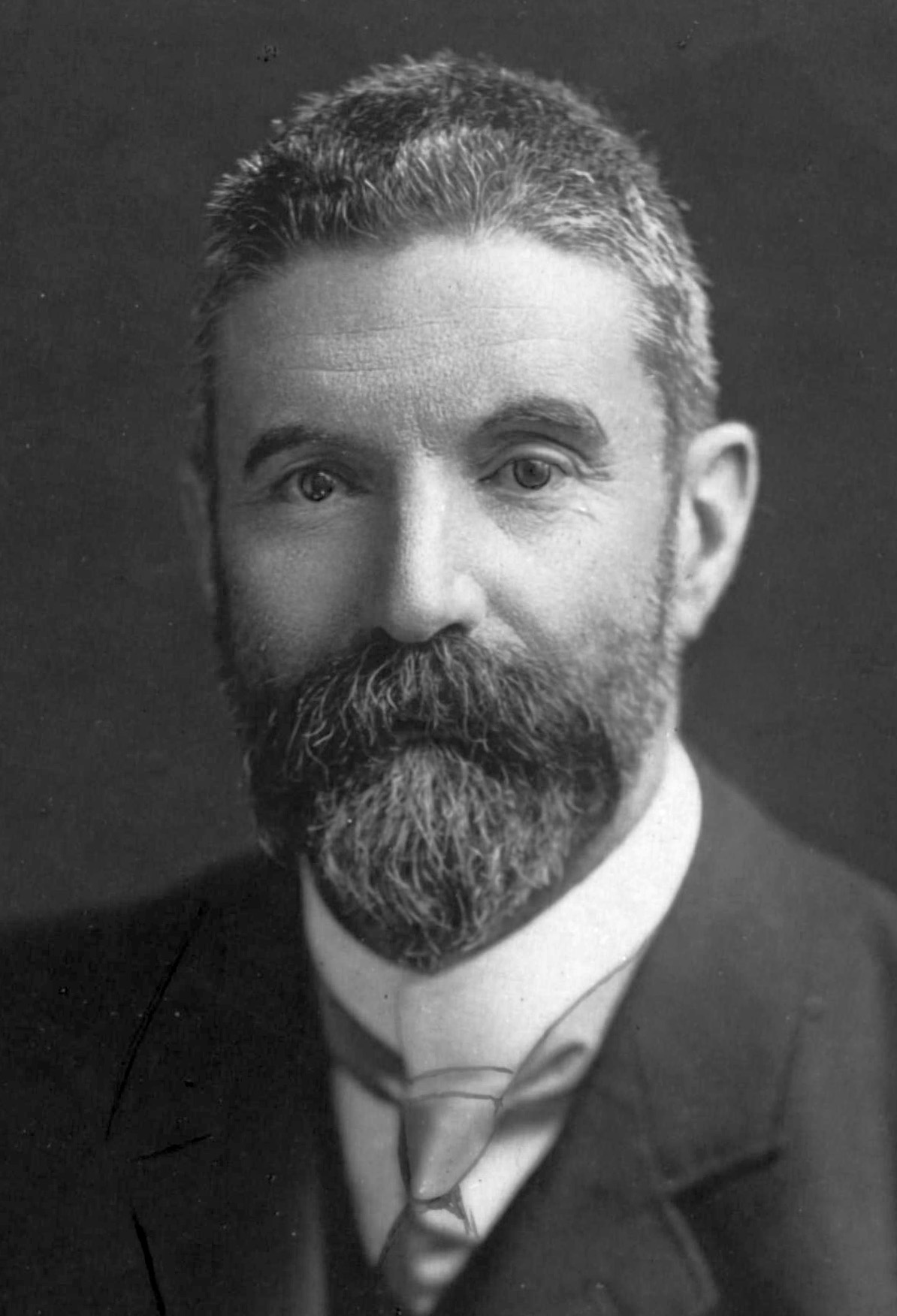

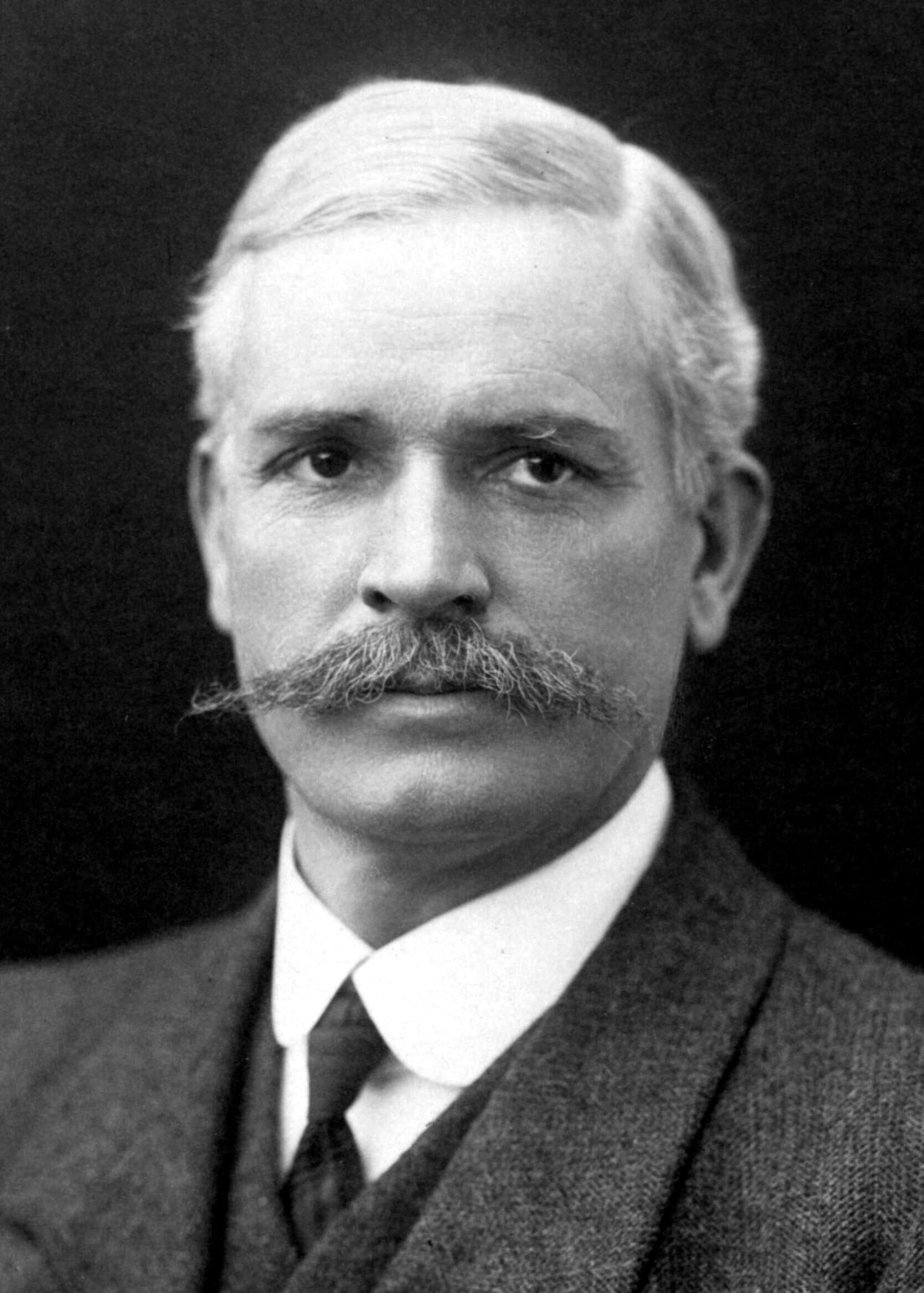
	First party	Second party
Leader	Alfred Deakin	Andrew Fisher
Party	Liberal	Labour
Last election	14 seats	4 seats
Seats won	11	10
Seat change	▼3	▲6
Popular vote	211,253	210,334
Percentage	45.82%	45.62%
Swing	▼6.17	▲15.18

=== Balaclava ===
1910 Australian federal election: Balaclava
Party	Candidate	Votes	%	±%
Liberal	Agar Wynne	12,432	62.0	−18.4
Labour	George Mead	7,615	38.0	+18.4
Total formal votes		20,047	98.2	
Informal votes		358	1.8	
Turnout		20,405	57.7	
Liberal hold		Swing	18.4	

=== Ballaarat ===
1910 Australian federal election: Ballaarat
Party	Candidate	Votes	%	±%
Liberal	Alfred Deakin	10,179	51.1	−15.1
Labour	David Russell	9,736	48.9	+15.1
Total formal votes		19,915	98.6	
Informal votes		281	1.4	
Turnout		20,196	74.9	
Liberal hold		Swing	−15.1	

=== Batman ===
1910 Australian federal election: Batman
Party	Candidate	Votes	%	±%
Labour	Henry Beard	13,569	63.6	+17.0
Liberal	Jabez Coon	7,765	36.4	−13.6
Total formal votes		21,334	98.5	
Informal votes		327	1.5	
Turnout		21,661	68.9	
Labour gain from Liberal		Swing	+15.3	

=== Bendigo ===
1910 Australian federal election: Bendigo
Party	Candidate	Votes	%	±%
Liberal	Sir John Quick	12,723	51.3	−0.4
Labour	Frank Brennan	12,065	48.7	+0.4
Total formal votes		24,788	99.0	
Informal votes		244	1.0	
Turnout		25,032	79.2	
Liberal gain from Independent		Swing	−0.4	

=== Bourke ===
1910 Australian federal election: Bourke
Party	Candidate	Votes	%	±%
Labour	Frank Anstey	17,918	58.6	+19.7
Liberal	James Hume Cook	12,660	41.4	−19.7
Total formal votes		30,578	98.8	
Informal votes		381	1.2	
Turnout		30,959	75.4	
Labour gain from Liberal		Swing	+15.3	

=== Corangamite ===
1910 Australian federal election: Corangamite
Party	Candidate	Votes	%	±%
Labour	James Scullin	11,300	54.7	+29.4
Liberal	Gratton Wilson	9,350	45.3	−29.4
Total formal votes		20,650	98.2	
Informal votes		385	1.8	
Turnout		21,035	68.6	
Labour gain from Liberal		Swing	+29.4	

=== Corio ===
1910 Australian federal election: Corio
Party	Candidate	Votes	%	±%
Labour	Alfred Ozanne	10,164	54.4	+54.4
Liberal	Richard Crouch	8,519	45.6	−9.4
Total formal votes		18,683	97.7	
Informal votes		434	2.3	
Turnout		19,117	62.2	
Labour gain from Liberal		Swing	+54.4	

=== Echuca ===
1910 Australian federal election: Echuca
Party	Candidate	Votes	%	±%
Liberal	Albert Palmer	7,881	43.7	−56.3
Independent	William Orr	7,757	43.0	+43.0
Independent	Anthony O'Dwyer	1,188	6.6	+6.6
Independent Liberal	William Everard	1,052	5.8	+5.8
Independent Liberal	John Davies	168	0.9	+0.9
Total formal votes		18,046	97.4	
Informal votes		476	2.6	
Turnout		18,522	62.4	
Liberal hold		Swing	−56.3	

=== Fawkner ===
1910 Australian federal election: Fawkner
Party	Candidate	Votes	%	±%
Liberal	George Fairbairn	14,544	58.9	−8.3
Labour	Joseph Hannan	10,161	41.1	+8.3
Total formal votes		24,705	98.5	
Informal votes		379	1.5	
Turnout		25,084	60.6	
Liberal hold		Swing	−5.0	

=== Flinders ===
1910 Australian federal election: Flinders
Party	Candidate	Votes	%	±%
Liberal	William Irvine	8,258	47.9	−52.1
Labour	Frank Buckley	5,490	31.8	+31.8
Independent Liberal	Timothy McInerney	3,491	20.3	+20.3
Total formal votes		17,239	96.7	
Informal votes		587	3.3	
Turnout		17,826	58.1	
Liberal hold		Swing	−52.1	

=== Gippsland ===
1910 Australian federal election: Gippsland
Party	Candidate	Votes	%	±%
Independent Liberal	George Wise	11,306	62.1	+62.1
Liberal	James Bowden	6,897	37.9	−62.1
Total formal votes		18,203	99.0	
Informal votes		181	1.0	
Turnout		18,384	65.5	
Independent Liberal gain from Liberal		Swing	+62.1	

=== Grampians ===
1910 Australian federal election: Grampians
Party	Candidate	Votes	%	±%
Liberal	Hans Irvine	9,000	50.4	−5.4
Labour	Archibald Stewart	8,857	49.6	+5.4
Total formal votes		17,857	98.4	
Informal votes		294	1.6	
Turnout		18,151	65.5	
Liberal hold		Swing	−5.4	

=== Indi ===
1910 Australian federal election: Indi
Party	Candidate	Votes	%	±%
Labour	Parker Moloney	10,900	53.1	+14.1
Liberal	Joseph Brown	9,633	46.9	−14.1
Total formal votes		20,533	98.4	
Informal votes		332	1.6	
Turnout		20,865	68.7	
Labour gain from Liberal		Swing	+7.2	

=== Kooyong ===
1910 Australian federal election: Kooyong
Party	Candidate	Votes	%	±%
Liberal	William Knox	15,089	56.3	−37.1
Independent Liberal	Alfred Lumsden	11,733	43.7	+43.7
Total formal votes		26,822	99.1	
Informal votes		253	0.9	
Turnout		27,075	71.1	
Liberal hold		Swing	−37.1	

=== Laanecoorie ===
1910 Australian federal election: Laanecoorie
Party	Candidate	Votes	%	±%
Liberal	Carty Salmon	8,959	50.8	−17.0
Labour	Arthur Fraser	8,664	49.2	+17.0
Total formal votes		17,623	98.3	
Informal votes		296	1.7	
Turnout		17,919	68.5	
Liberal hold		Swing	−1.9	

=== Maribyrnong ===
1910 Australian federal election: Maribyrnong
Party	Candidate	Votes	%	±%
Labour	James Fenton	16,284	60.8	+17.7
Liberal	Samuel Mauger	10,496	39.2	−17.7
Total formal votes		26,780	98.6	
Informal votes		372	1.4	
Turnout		27,152	71.7	
Labour gain from Liberal		Swing	+17.7	

=== Melbourne ===
1910 Australian federal election: Melbourne
Party	Candidate	Votes	%	±%
Labour	William Maloney	13,830	67.0	+6.6
Liberal	William McPherson	6,825	33.0	−6.6
Total formal votes		20,655	98.3	
Informal votes		360	1.7	
Turnout		21,015	60.3	
Labour hold		Swing	+6.6	

=== Melbourne Ports ===
1910 Australian federal election: Melbourne Ports
Party	Candidate	Votes	%	±%
Labour	James Mathews	15,055	69.6	+29.0
Liberal	Alexander Ramsay	6,583	30.4	−5.0
Total formal votes		21,638	98.3	
Informal votes		368	1.7	
Turnout		22,006	65.4	
Labour hold		Swing	+17.0	

=== Mernda ===
1910 Australian federal election: Mernda
Party	Candidate	Votes	%	±%
Liberal	Robert Harper	7,917	44.1	−18.2
Labour	James Kenneally	7,280	40.6	+13.4
Independent Liberal	Thomas Hunt	1,945	10.8	+10.8
Independent	Stephen Thompson	794	4.4	+4.4
Total formal votes		17,936	97.9	
Informal votes		386	2.1	
Turnout		18,322	62.2	
Liberal hold		Swing	−2.9	

=== Wannon ===
1910 Australian federal election: Wannon
Party	Candidate	Votes	%	±%
Labour	John McDougall	11,977	55.0	+2.2
Liberal	Samuel Cooke	9,797	45.0	−2.2
Total formal votes		21,744	98.8	
Informal votes		262	1.2	
Turnout		22,036	75.5	
Labour hold		Swing	+2.2	

=== Wimmera ===
1910 Australian federal election: Wimmera
Party	Candidate	Votes	%	±%
Liberal	Sydney Sampson	11,488	66.0	−0.5
Labour	Richard Taffe	5,920	34.0	+10.8
Total formal votes		17,408	97.9	
Informal votes		366	2.1	
Turnout		17,774	57.3	
Liberal hold		Swing	+1.8	

=== Yarra ===
1910 Australian federal election: Yarra
Party	Candidate	Votes	%	±%
Labour	Frank Tudor	13,549	76.1	+17.8
Liberal	Elizee De Garis	4,258	23.9	+23.9
Total formal votes		17,807	98.9	
Informal votes		189	1.1	
Turnout		17,996	65.2	
Labour hold		Swing	+17.8	

== Queensland ==
1910 Australian federal election (Queensland)
← 1906	13 April 1910	1913 →

All 9 Queensland seats in the House of Representatives
- Registered: 279,031
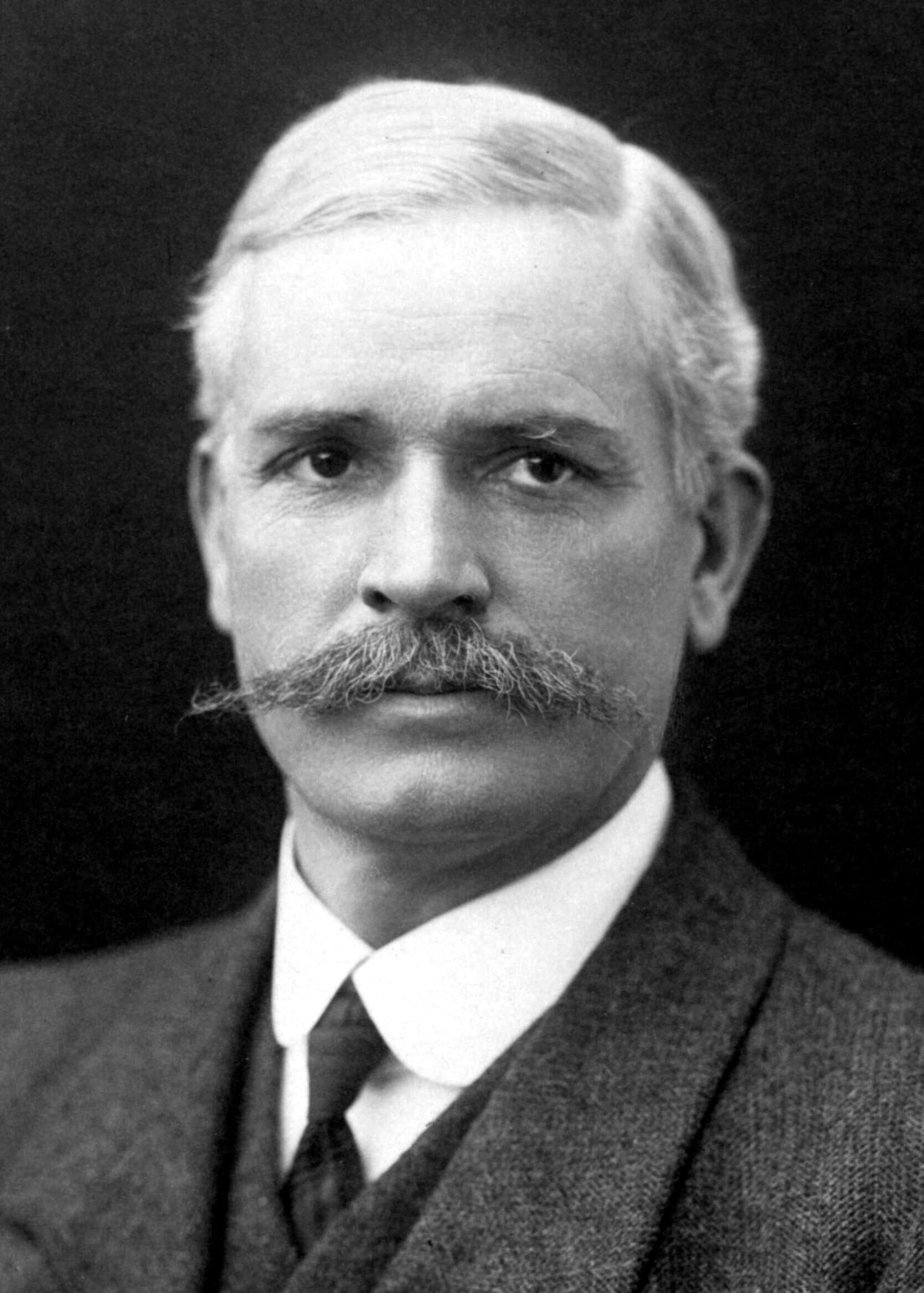

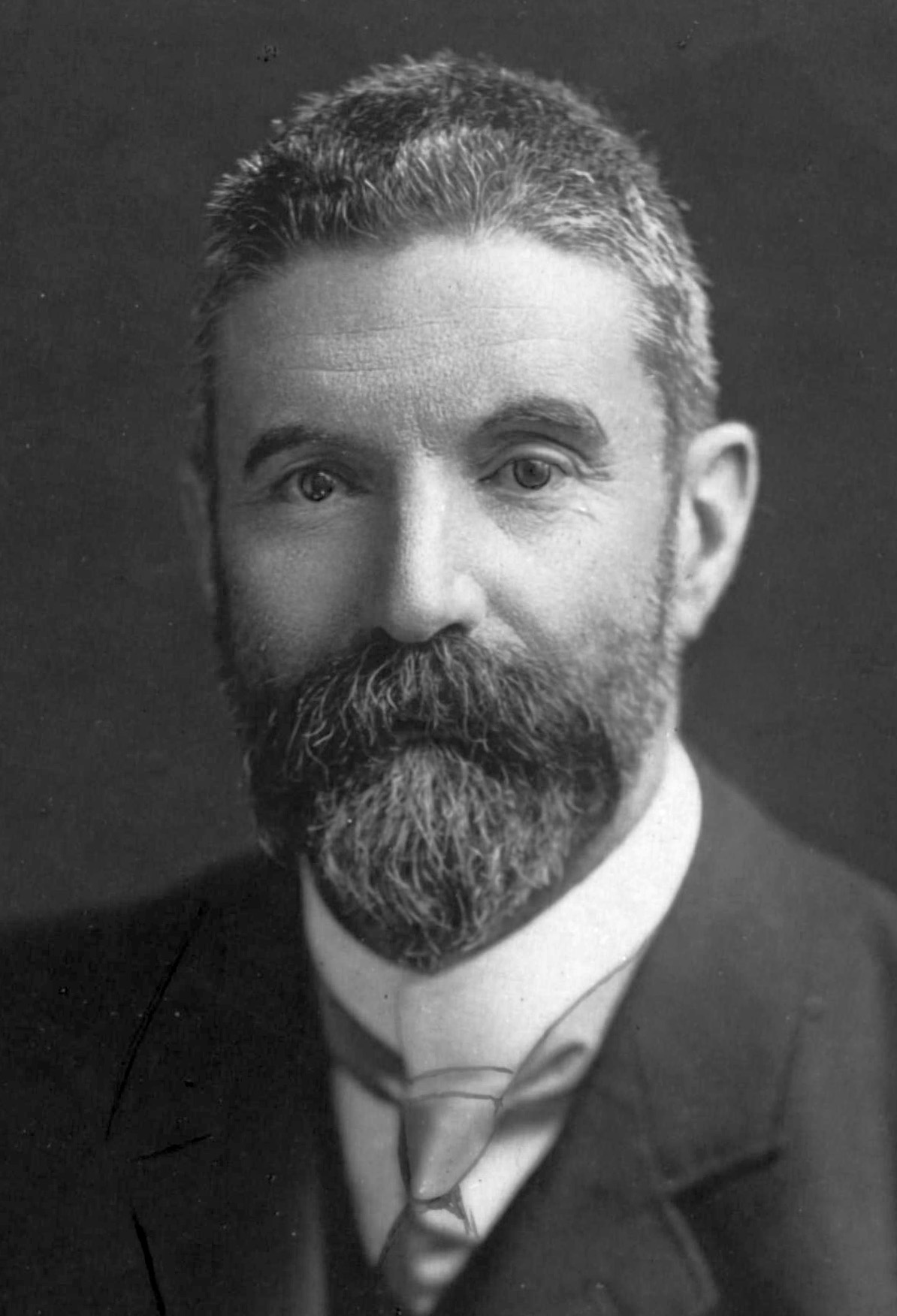
	First party	Second party
Leader	Andrew Fisher	Alfred Deakin
Party	Labour	Liberal
Last election	4 seats	5 seats
Seats won	6	3
Seat change	▲2	▼2
Popular vote	78,881	80,367
Percentage	47.64	48.54%
Swing	▲4.69	▼8.51

=== Brisbane ===
1910 Australian federal election: Brisbane
Party	Candidate	Votes	%	±%
Labour	William Finlayson	8,909	51.2	+12.6
Liberal	Justin Foxton	8,500	48.8	−12.5
Total formal votes		17,409	97.1	
Informal votes		501	2.9	
Turnout		17,930	61.0	
Labour gain from Liberal		Swing	+12.5	

=== Capricornia ===
1910 Australian federal election: Capricornia
Party	Candidate	Votes	%	±%
Labour	William Higgs	11,759	56.8	+12.4
Liberal	Edward Archer	8,950	43.2	−12.4
Total formal votes		20,759	98.0	
Informal votes		413	2.0	
Turnout		21,122	68.0	
Labour gain from Liberal		Swing	+12.4	

=== Darling Downs ===
1910 Australian federal election: Darling Downs
Party	Candidate	Votes	%	±%
Liberal	Littleton Groom	13,010	69.9	+4.8
Labour	Morris Harland	5,609	30.1	−4.8
Total formal votes		18,619	97.2	
Informal votes		540	2.8	
Turnout		19,159	57.2	
Liberal hold		Swing	+4.8	

=== Herbert ===
1910 Australian federal election: Herbert
Party	Candidate	Votes	%	±%
Labour	Fred Bamford	13,668	61.0	+8.1
Liberal	Thomas Crawford	8,751	39.0	−8.1
Total formal votes		22,419	96.7	
Informal votes		765	3.3	
Turnout		23,184	61.5	
Labour hold		Swing	+8.1	

=== Kennedy ===
1910 Australian federal election: Kennedy
Party	Candidate	Votes	%	±%
Labour	Charles McDonald	8,729	64.8	+7.0
Liberal	John Houghton	4,742	35.2	−7.0
Total formal votes		13,471	95.7	
Informal votes		605	4.3	
Turnout		14,076	61.5	
Labour hold		Swing	+7.0	

=== Maranoa ===
1910 Australian federal election: Maranoa
Party	Candidate	Votes	%	±%
Labour	Jim Page	10,862	71.0	+2.2
Liberal	Jasper Harvey	4,436	29.0	−2.2
Total formal votes		15,298	96.8	
Informal votes		510	3.2	
Turnout		15,808	53.6	
Labour hold		Swing	+2.2	

=== Moreton ===
1910 Australian federal election: Moreton
Party	Candidate	Votes	%	±%
Liberal	Hugh Sinclair	11,276	61.1	−1.4
Labour	Thomas Emmerson	7,191	38.9	+1.4
Total formal votes		18,467	97.7	
Informal votes		442	2.3	
Turnout		18,909	58.7	
Liberal hold		Swing	−1.4	

=== Oxley ===
1910 Australian federal election: Oxley
Party	Candidate	Votes	%	±%
Liberal	Richard Edwards	10,399	62.2	−4.4
Independent	Frederick Dent	6,317	37.8	+37.8
Total formal votes		16,716	94.9	
Informal votes		893	5.1	
Turnout		17,609	57.2	
Liberal hold		Swing	−4.4	

=== Wide Bay ===
1910 Australian federal election: Wide Bay
Party	Candidate	Votes	%	±%
Labour	Andrew Fisher	12,154	54.1	−0.4
Liberal	Jacob Stumm	10,303	45.9	+0.4
Total formal votes		22,457	98.3	
Informal votes		380	1.7	
Turnout		22,837	71.4	
Labour hold		Swing	−0.4	

== South Australia ==
1910 Australian federal election (South Australia)
← 1906	13 April 1910	1913 →

All 7 South Australian seats in the House of Representatives
- Registered: 207,655
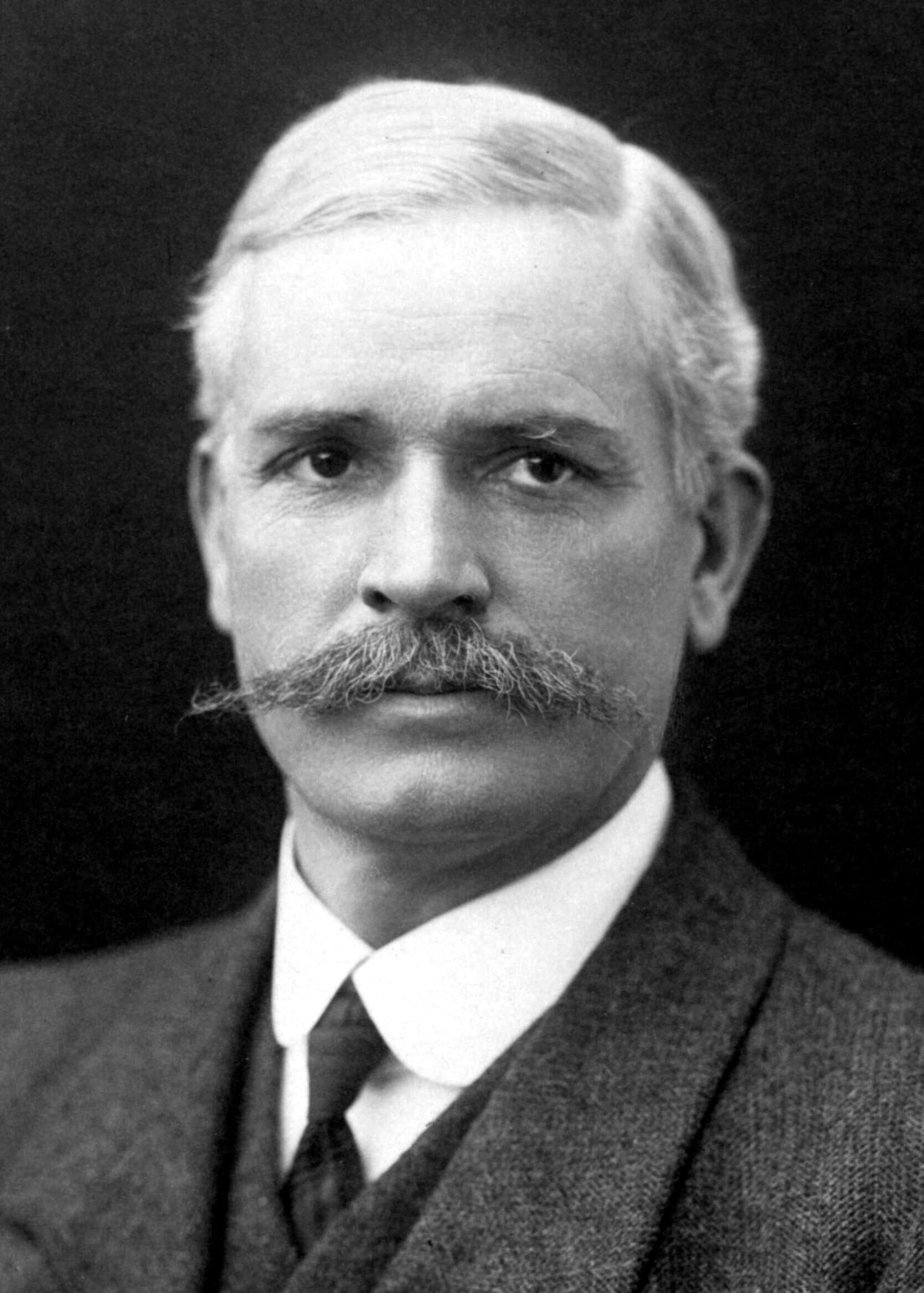

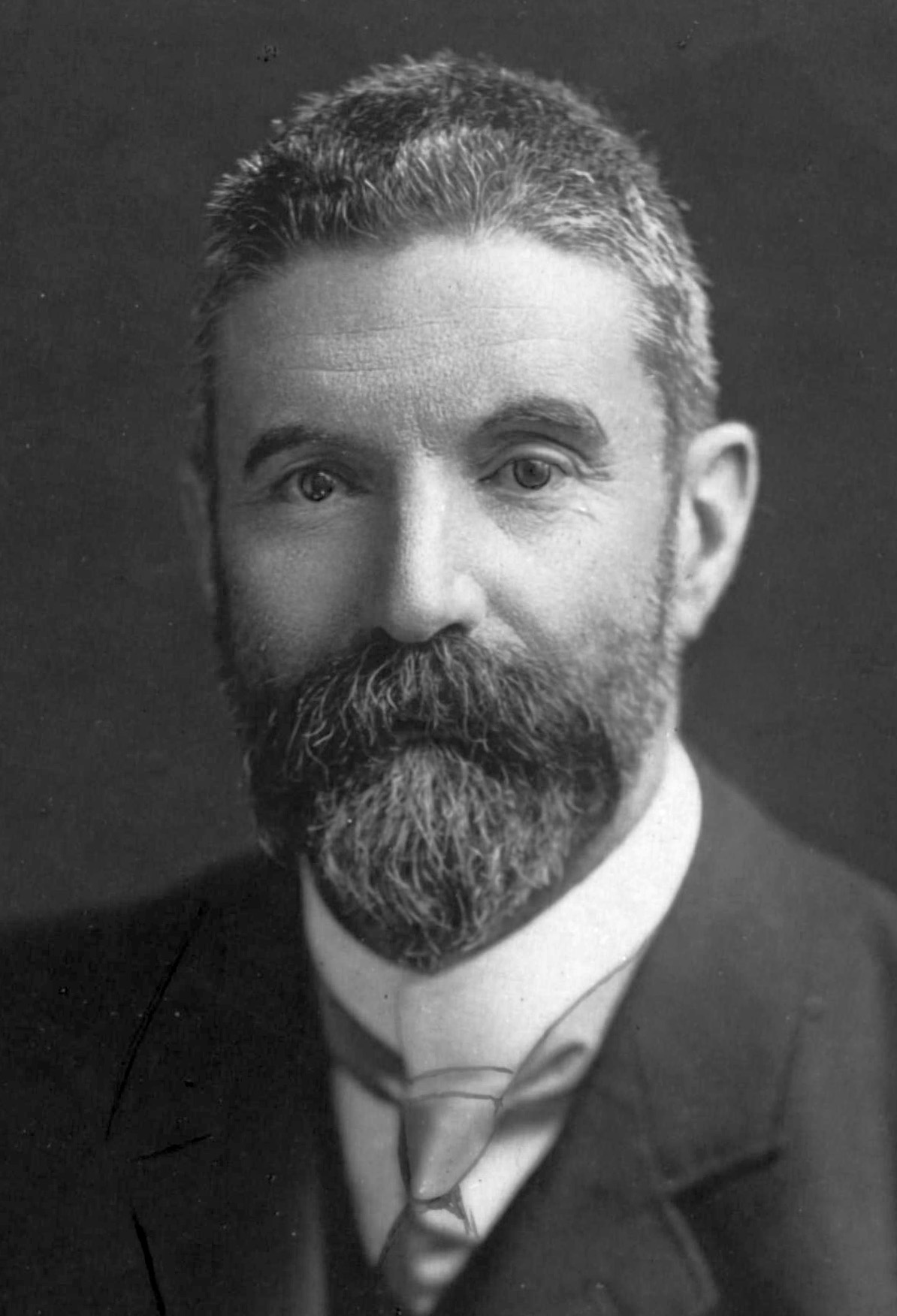
	First party	Second party
Leader	Andrew Fisher	Alfred Deakin
Party	Labour	Liberal
Last election	3 seats	3 seats
Seats won	4	3
Seat change	▲1	Steady
Popular vote	34,156	23,687
Percentage	53.63%	37.19%
Swing	▲15.29	▼1.91

=== Adelaide ===
1910 Australian federal election: Adelaide
Party	Candidate	Votes	%	±%
Labour	Ernest Roberts	9,443	63.3	+63.3
Liberal	Alexander McLachlan	5,466	36.7	−63.3
Total formal votes		14,909	97.0	
Informal votes		457	3.0	
Turnout		15,366	53.2	
Labour hold		Swing	+63.3	

=== Angas ===
1910 Australian federal election: Angas
Party	Candidate	Votes	%	±%
Liberal	Paddy Glynn	unopposed		
Liberal hold		Swing		

=== Barker ===
1910 Australian federal election: Barker
Party	Candidate	Votes	%	±%
Liberal	John Livingston	9,519	59.5	+1.4
Labour	Martin Dwyer	6,473	40.5	−1.4
Total formal votes		15,992	96.1	
Informal votes		642	3.9	
Turnout		16,634	55.8	
Liberal hold		Swing	+1.4	

=== Boothby ===
1910 Australian federal election: Boothby
Party	Candidate	Votes	%	±%
Labour	Lee Batchelor	9,786	63.8	−36.2
Independent Liberal	Paris Nesbit	5,546	36.2	+36.2
Total formal votes		15,332	91.8	
Informal votes		1,367	8.2	
Turnout		16,699	55.4	
Labour hold		Swing	−36.2	

=== Grey ===
1910 Australian federal election: Grey
Party	Candidate	Votes	%	±%
Labour	Alexander Poynton	unopposed		
Labour hold		Swing		

=== Hindmarsh ===
1910 Australian federal election: Hindmarsh
Party	Candidate	Votes	%	±%
Labour	William Archibald	unopposed		
Labour hold		Swing		

=== Wakefield ===
1910 Australian federal election: Wakefield
Party	Candidate	Votes	%	±%
Liberal	Richard Foster	8,702	49.9	+49.9
Labour	John Vaughan	8,454	48.4	+12.2
Young Australia	Charles Horne	296	1.7	+1.7
Total formal votes		17,452	95.1	
Informal votes		890	4.9	
Turnout		18,342	58.9	
Liberal hold		Swing	+49.9	

== Western Australia ==
1910 Australian federal election (Western Australia)
← 1906	13 April 1910	1913 →

All 5 Western Australian seats in the House of Representatives
- Registered: 134,979
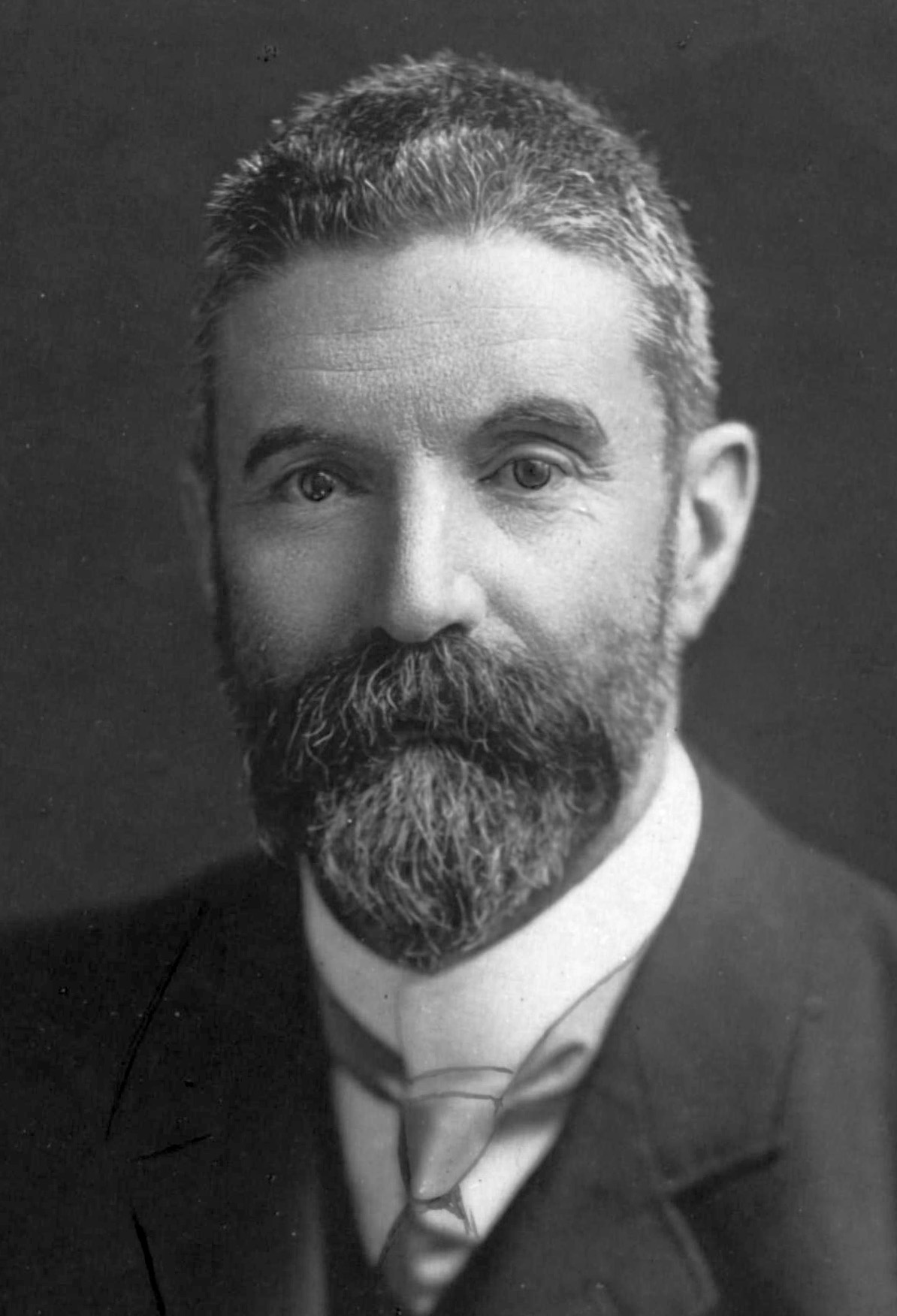

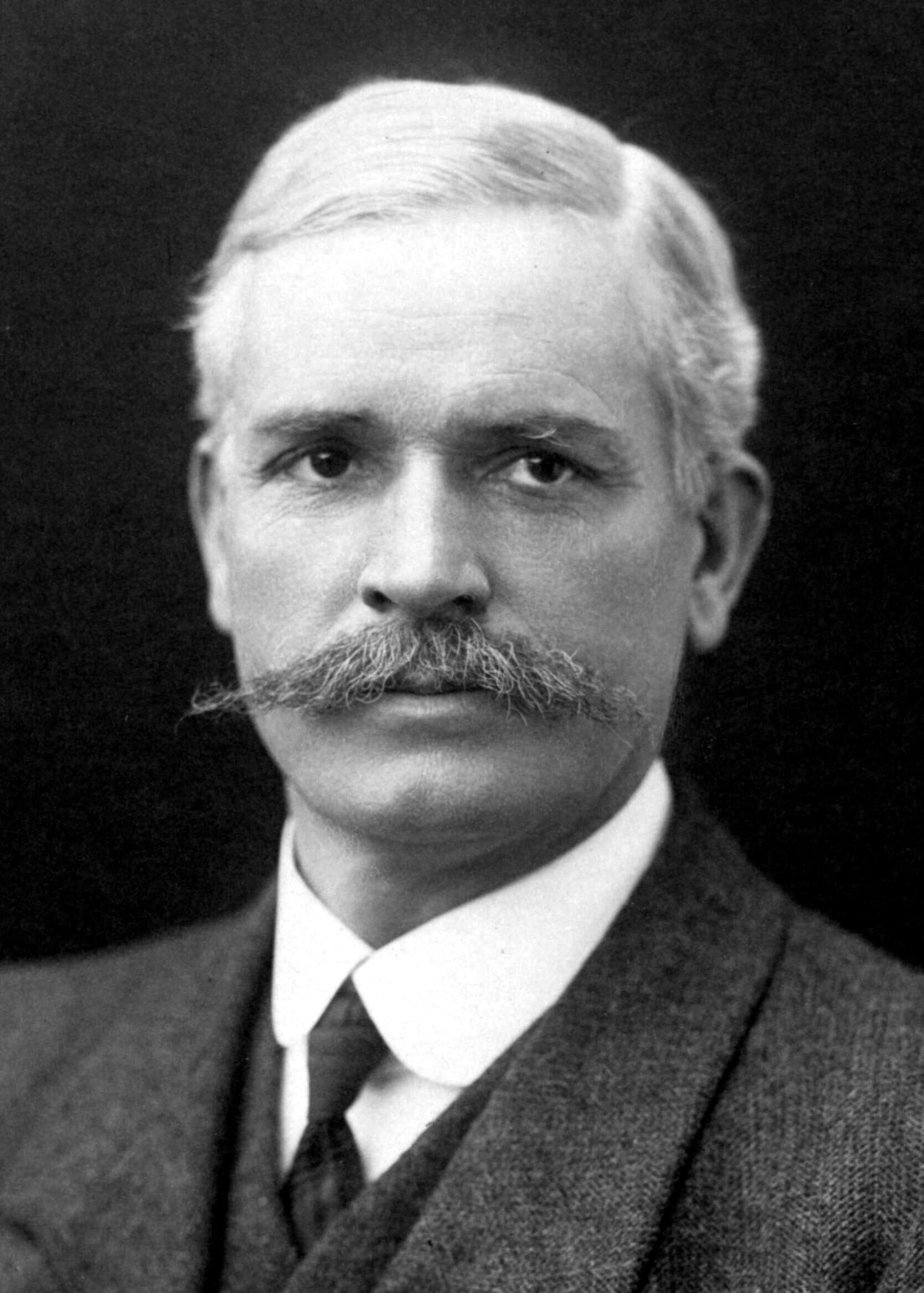
	First party	Second party
Leader	Alfred Deakin	Andrew Fisher
Party	Liberal	Labour
Last election	—	3 seats
Seats won	3	2
Seat change	▲3	▼1
Popular vote	38,168	43,740
Percentage	46.47%	53.25%
Swing	—	▼2.87

=== Coolgardie ===
1910 Australian federal election: Coolgardie
Party	Candidate	Votes	%	±%
Labour	Hugh Mahon	9,915	74.5	+1.4
Liberal	Robert Hastie	3,170	23.8	−3.1
Independent	Harry McClay	226	1.7	+1.7
Total formal votes		13,311	96.2	
Informal votes		523	3.8	
Turnout		13,834	55.7	
Labour hold		Swing	+2.3	

=== Fremantle ===
1910 Australian federal election: Fremantle
Party	Candidate	Votes	%	±%
Liberal	William Hedges	7,788	54.5	+3.6
Labour	William Carpenter	6,496	45.5	−3.6
Total formal votes		14,284	98.0	
Informal votes		291	2.0	
Turnout		14,575	66.4	
Liberal hold		Swing	+3.6	

=== Kalgoorlie ===
1910 Australian federal election: Kalgoorlie
Party	Candidate	Votes	%	±%
Labour	Charlie Frazer	11,162	81.4	+2.4
Liberal	John Thornett	2,550	18.6	−2.4
Total formal votes		13,712	98.5	
Informal votes		214	1.5	
Turnout		13,926	64.3	
Labour hold		Swing	+2.4	

=== Perth ===
1910 Australian federal election: Perth
Party	Candidate	Votes	%	±%
Liberal	James Fowler	9,648	60.7	+13.4
Labour	Ernest Henshaw	6,237	39.3	−13.4
Total formal votes		15,885	97.7	
Informal votes		371	2.3	
Turnout		16,256	59.8	
Liberal gain from Labour		Swing	+13.4	

=== Swan ===
1910 Australian federal election: Swan
Party	Candidate	Votes	%	±%
Liberal	Sir John Forrest	15,012	60.2	−6.0
Labour	Peter O'Loghlen	9,930	39.8	+6.0
Total formal votes		24,942	98.6	
Informal votes		360	1.4	
Turnout		25,302	64.3	
Liberal hold		Swing	−2.0	

== Tasmania ==
1910 Australian federal election (Tasmania)
← 1906	13 April 1910	1913 →

All 5 Tasmanian seats in the House of Representatives
- Registered: 98,456
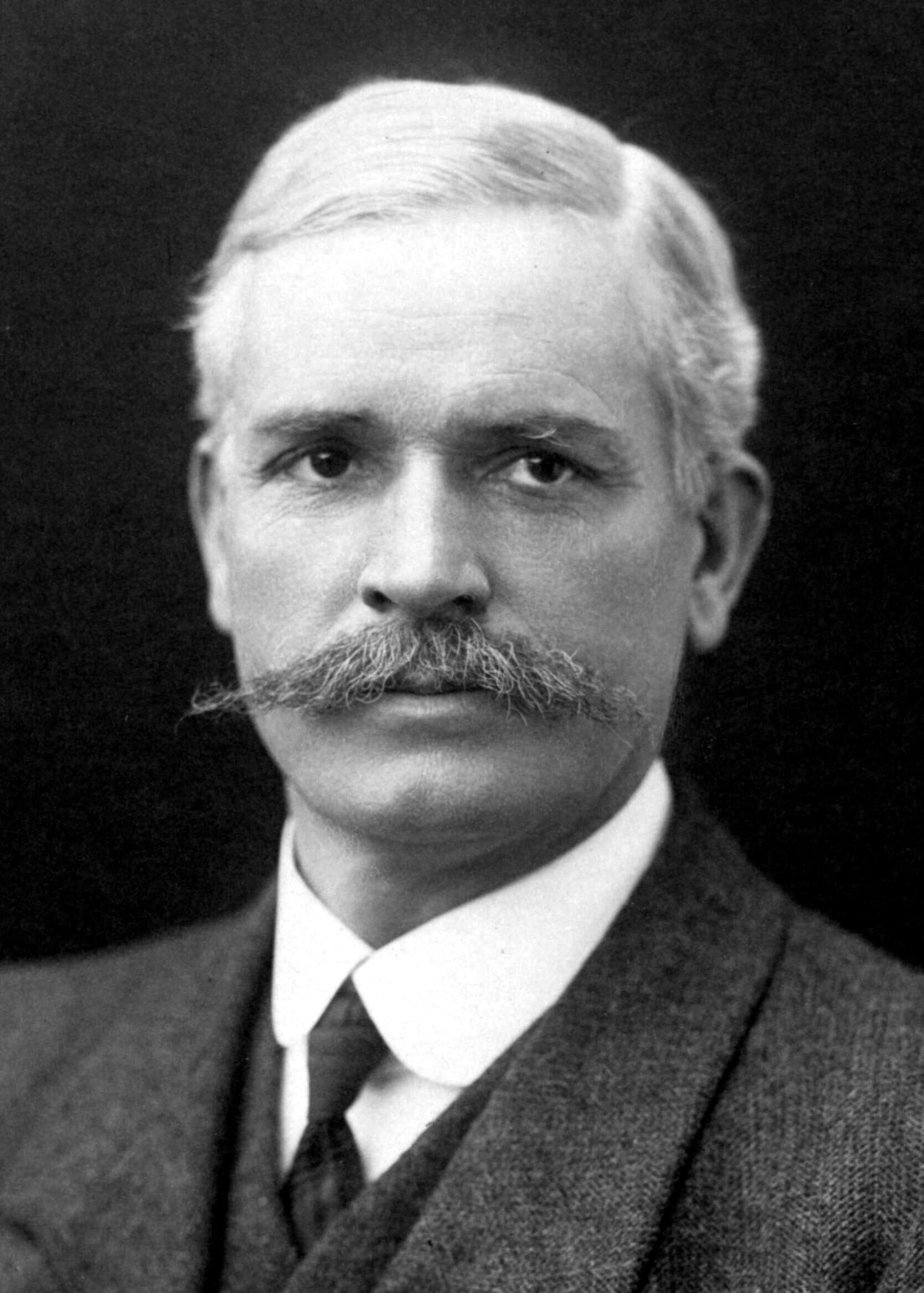

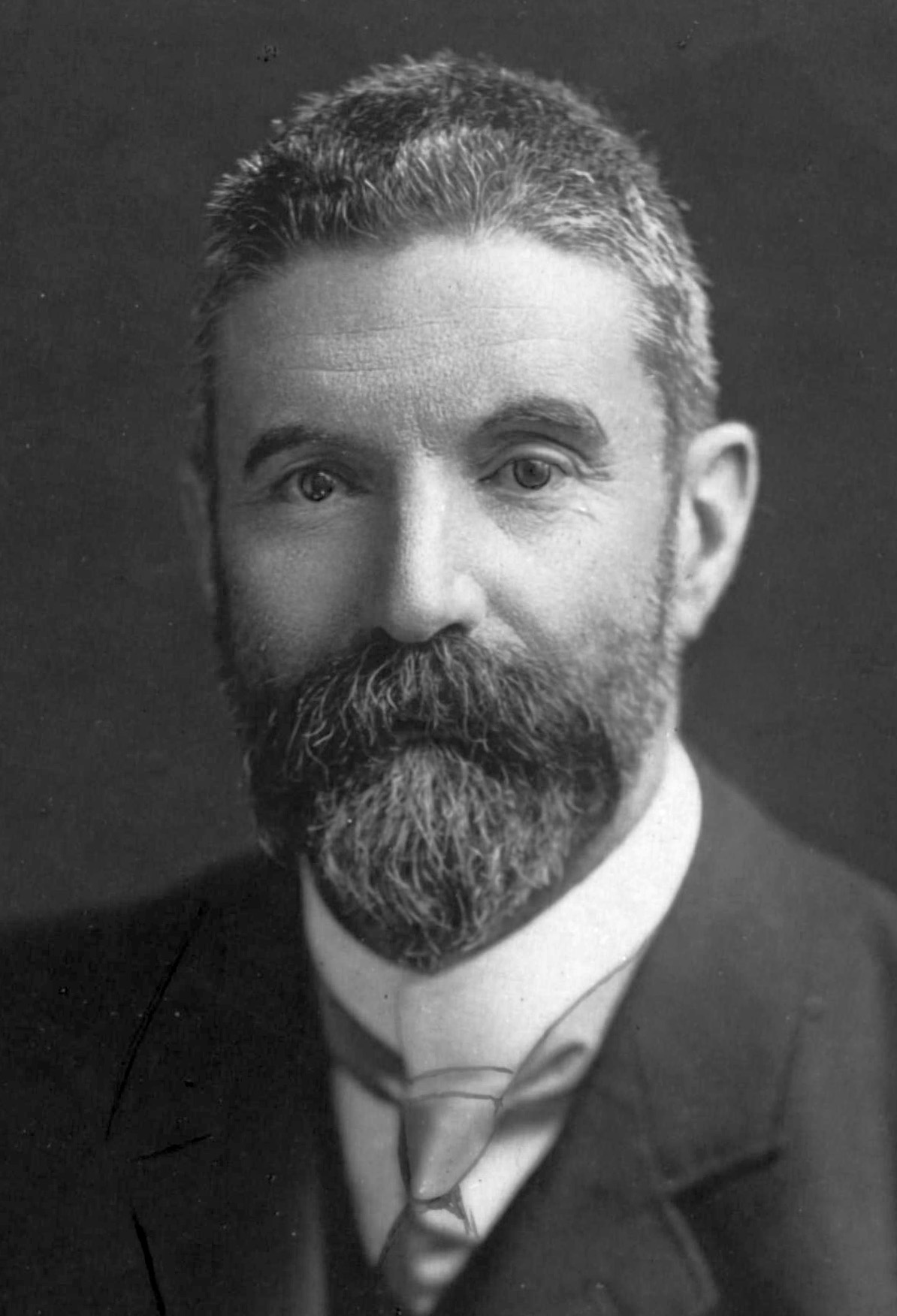
	First party	Second party
Leader	Andrew Fisher	Alfred Deakin
Party	Labour	Liberal
Last election	1 seat	4 seats
Seats won	3	2
Seat change	▲2	▼2
Popular vote	30,233	20,907
Percentage	53.83%	37.23%
Swing	▲21.24	▼24.11

=== Bass ===
1910 Australian federal election: Bass
Party	Candidate	Votes	%	±%
Labour	Jens Jensen	6,612	56.8	+56.8
Ind. Protectionist	David Storrer	5,022	43.2	−3.6
Total formal votes		11,643	97.9	
Informal votes		248	2.1	
Turnout		11,882	56.8	
Labour gain from Liberal		Swing	+56.8	

=== Darwin ===
1910 Australian federal election: Darwin
Party	Candidate	Votes	%	±%
Labour	King O'Malley	6,681	63.3	+8.3
Liberal	William Fisher	3,881	36.7	+0.7
Total formal votes		10,862	97.9	
Informal votes		234	2.1	
Turnout		10,796	53.6	
Labour hold		Swing	+3.8	

=== Denison ===
1910 Australian federal election: Denison
Party	Candidate	Votes	%	±%
Labour	William Laird Smith	7,170	58.1	+20.5
Liberal	Matthew Simmons	5,172	41.9	−20.5
Total formal votes		12,342	97.2	
Informal votes		359	2.8	
Turnout		12,701	64.6	
Labour gain from Liberal		Swing	+18.6	

=== Franklin ===
1910 Australian federal election: Franklin
Party	Candidate	Votes	%	±%
Liberal	William McWilliams	6,356	53.4	−46.6
Labour	William Shoobridge	5,554	46.6	+46.6
Total formal votes		11,910	97.1	
Informal votes		354	2.9	
Turnout		12,264	61.6	
Liberal hold		Swing	−46.6	

=== Wilmot ===
1910 Australian federal election: Wilmot
Party	Candidate	Votes	%	±%
Liberal	Llewellyn Atkinson	5,498	56.6	−6.6
Labour	Thomas Wilson	4,216	43.4	+6.6
Total formal votes		9,714	97.5	
Informal votes		252	2.5	
Turnout		9,966	55.9	
Liberal hold		Swing	−6.6	

== See also ==
- Candidates of the 1910 Australian federal election
- Members of the Australian House of Representatives, 1910–1913
- Results of the 1910 Australian federal election (Senate)
