= Candidates of the 1910 Australian federal election =

This article provides information on candidates who stood for the 1910 Australian federal election. The election was held on 13 April 1910.

The Commonwealth Liberal Party was formed in 1909 as a merger between several conservative groups. Seats previously held by the Protectionist Party, the Anti-Socialist Party, the Western Australian Party, or the Victorian independent Protectionists are considered to be held by the Liberal Party.

== By-elections, appointments and defections ==
=== By-elections and appointments ===
- On 10 July 1907, Albert Palmer (Anti-Socialist) was re-elected to Echuca after his election in 1906 was declared void.
- On 11 July 1907, James O'Loghlin (Labour) was appointed as a South Australian Senator after the voiding of the election of Joseph Vardon (Anti-Socialist).
- On 15 February 1908, Joseph Vardon (Anti-Socialist) was elected as a South Australian Senator in a special election following the voiding of the appointment of James O'Loghlin (Labour).
- On 13 June 1908, Ernest Roberts (Labour) was elected to replace Charles Kingston (Protectionist) as the member for Adelaide.
- On 28 August 1909, Richard Foster (Liberal) was elected to replace Sir Frederick Holder (Independent) as the member for Wakefield.
- On 6 December 1909, James Hutchison (Labour), the member for Hindmarsh, died. Due to the proximity of the election, no by-election was held.
- On 24 December 1909, George Reid (Liberal) resigned as the member for East Sydney. Due to the proximity of the election, no by-election was held.

=== Defections ===
- In 1909, Protectionist leader Alfred Deakin negotiated a merger between his party and Joseph Cook's Anti-Socialists, which became the Commonwealth Liberal Party. The party was joined by most sitting Protectionists and Anti-Socialists, together with Labour MP James Fowler (Perth), WAP MP William Hedges (Fremantle), Independent Senator William Trenwith (Victoria), and the "Corner" group of Independent Protectionists: George Fairbairn (Fawkner), Sir John Forrest (Swan), Sir John Quick (Bendigo), Sydney Sampson (Wimmera) and Agar Wynne (Balaclava). Protectionists Sir William Lyne (Hume), George Wise (Gippsland) and David Storrer (Bass), who were sceptical of the merger, became Independents, as did Anti-Socialist Senator Sir Josiah Symon (South Australia). Protectionist MP John Chanter (Riverina) joined the Labour Party.

== Retiring Members and Senators ==
=== Labour ===
- Chris Watson MP (South Sydney, NSW)
- Senator John Croft (WA)

=== Liberal ===
- Sir Thomas Ewing MP (Richmond, NSW)
- Sir Philip Fysh MP (Denison, Tas)
- Dugald Thomson MP (North Sydney, NSW)

== House of Representatives ==
Sitting members at the time of the election are shown in bold text. Successful candidates are highlighted in the relevant colour. Where there is possible confusion, an asterisk (*) is also used.

=== New South Wales ===
Electorate	Held by	Labour candidate	Liberal candidate	Other candidates
Barrier	Labour	**Josiah Thomas**	William Shepherd	
Calare	Labour	**Thomas Brown**	Henry Pigott	
Cook	Labour	**James Catts**	William Clegg	
Cowper	Liberal	Clem Johnson	**John Thomson**	John O'Brien (Ind Lab)
Dalley	Liberal	Robert Howe	**Bill Wilks**	
Darling	Labour	**William Spence**	James Carroll	
East Sydney	Liberal	John West	Samuel Lees	
Eden-Monaro	Liberal		**Austin Chapman**	
Gwydir	Labour	**William Webster**	Robert Patten	
Hume	Liberal		Bernard Grogan	**Sir William Lyne** (Ind)
Hunter	Liberal	Matthew Charlton	**Frank Liddell**	
Illawarra	Liberal	George Burns	**George Fuller**	
Lang	Liberal	Thomas Crawford	**Elliot Johnson**	
Macquarie	Labour	**Ernest Carr**	Alfred Conroy	
Nepean	Liberal	George Cann	**Eric Bowden**	
Newcastle	Labour	**David Watkins**	Frank Pulsford	
New England	Labour	**Frank Foster**	William Fleming	
North Sydney	Liberal	Percy Tighe	George Edwards	John Steel (YANP)
Parkes	Liberal	Ernest Burgess	**Bruce Smith**	Herbert Pratten (Ind Lib)
Parramatta	Liberal	Bert Broue	**Joseph Cook**	
Richmond	Liberal	William Gillies	Walter Massy-Greene	Venour Nathan (Ind Lib); Robert Pyers (Ind Lab)
Riverina	Liberal	**John Chanter**	John Jackson	Edmund O'Dwyer (Ind Lib)
Robertson	Liberal	William Johnson	**Henry Willis**	
South Sydney	Labour	Edward Riley	Eden George	
Wentworth	Liberal	Arthur Vernon	**Willie Kelly**	
Werriwa	Labour	**David Hall**	Granville Ryrie	
West Sydney	Labour	**Billy Hughes**	Stanley Cole	Harry Holland (Soc Lab)

=== Queensland ===
Electorate	Held by	Labour candidate	Liberal candidate	Other candidates
Brisbane	Liberal	William Finlayson	**Justin Foxton**	
Capricornia	Liberal	William Higgs	**Edward Archer**	
Darling Downs	Liberal	Morris Harland	**Littleton Groom**	
Herbert	Labour	**Fred Bamford**	Thomas Crawford	
Kennedy	Labour	**Charles McDonald**	John Houghton	
Maranoa	Labour	**Jim Page**	Jasper Harvey	
Moreton	Liberal	Thomas Emmerson	**Hugh Sinclair**	
Oxley	Liberal		**Richard Edwards**	Frederick Dent (Ind)
Wide Bay	Labour	**Andrew Fisher**	Jacob Stumm	

=== South Australia ===
Electorate	Held by	Labour candidate	Liberal candidate	Other candidates
Adelaide	Labour	**Ernest Roberts**	Alexander McLachlan	
Angas	Liberal		**Paddy Glynn**	
Barker	Liberal	Martin Dwyer	**John Livingston**	
Boothby	Labour	**Lee Batchelor**		Paris Nesbit (Ind Lib)
Grey	Labour	**Alexander Poynton**		
Hindmarsh	Labour	William Archibald		
Wakefield	Liberal	John Vaughan	**Richard Foster**	Charles Horne (YANP)

=== Tasmania ===
Electorate	Held by	Labour candidate	Liberal candidate	Other candidates
Bass	Liberal	Jens Jensen		**David Storrer** (Ind Prot)
Darwin	Labour	**King O'Malley**	William Fisher	
Denison	Liberal	William Laird Smith	Matthew Simmons	
Franklin	Liberal	William Shoobridge	**William McWilliams**	
Wilmot	Liberal	Thomas Wilson	**Llewellyn Atkinson**	

=== Victoria ===
Electorate	Held by	Labour candidate	Liberal candidate	Other candidates
Balaclava	Liberal	George Mead	**Agar Wynne**	
Ballaarat	Liberal	David Russell	**Alfred Deakin**	
Batman	Liberal	Henry Beard	**Jabez Coon**	
Bendigo	Liberal	Frank Brennan	**Sir John Quick**	
Bourke	Liberal	Frank Anstey	**James Hume Cook**	
Corangamite	Liberal	James Scullin	**Gratton Wilson**	
Corio	Liberal	Alfred Ozanne	**Richard Crouch**	
Echuca	Liberal		**Albert Palmer**	Hugh Davies (Ind Lib); William Everard (Ind Lib); Anthony O'Dwyer (Ind); William Orr (Ind)
Fawkner	Liberal	Joseph Hannan	**George Fairbairn**	
Flinders	Liberal	Frank Buckley	**William Irvine**	Timothy McInerney (Ind Lib)
Gippsland	Liberal		James Bowden	**George Wise** (Ind Lib)
Grampians	Liberal	Archibald Stewart	**Hans Irvine**	
Indi	Liberal	Parker Moloney	**Joseph Brown**	
Kooyong	Liberal		**William Knox**	Alfred Lumsden (Ind Lib)
Laanecoorie	Liberal	Arthur Fraser	**Carty Salmon**	
Maribyrnong	Liberal	James Fenton	**Samuel Mauger**	
Melbourne	Labour	**William Maloney**	William McPherson	
Melbourne Ports	Labour	**James Mathews**	Alexander Ramsay	
Mernda	Liberal	James Kenneally	**Robert Harper**	Thomas Hunt (Ind Lib); Stephen Thompson (Ind)
Wannon	Labour	**John McDougall**	Samuel Cooke	
Wimmera	Liberal	Richard Taffe	**Sydney Sampson**	
Yarra	Labour	**Frank Tudor**	Elizee De Garis	

=== Western Australia ===
Electorate	Held by	Labour candidate	Liberal candidate	Independent candidate(s)
Coolgardie	Labour	**Hugh Mahon**	Robert Hastie	Harry McClay
Fremantle	Liberal	William Carpenter	**William Hedges**	
Kalgoorlie	Labour	**Charlie Frazer**	John Thornett	
Perth	Labour	Ernest Henshaw	**James Fowler**	
Swan	Liberal	Peter O'Loghlen	**Sir John Forrest**	

== Senate ==
Sitting senators are shown in bold text. Tickets that elected at least one Senator are highlighted in the relevant colour. Successful candidates are identified by an asterisk (*).

=== New South Wales ===
Three seats were up for election. The Liberal Party was defending three seats. Liberal Senators Sir Albert Gould, Edward Millen and James Walker were not up for re-election.

Labour candidates	Liberal candidates	Socialist Labor candidates	Independent candidates
Albert Gardiner*; Allan McDougall*; Arthur Rae*	**John Gray**; **John Neild**; **Edward Pulsford**	Thomas Hoare; Robert Mackenzie; James Moroney	John Norton

=== Queensland ===
Three seats were up for election. The Labour Party was defending three seats. Liberal Senators Thomas Chataway, Robert Sayers and Anthony St Ledger were not up for re-election.

Labour candidates	Liberal candidates	Independent candidates
**Thomas Givens***; **James Stewart***; **Harry Turley***	Thomas Glassey; Hugh Macrossan; Joe Millican	William Kellett; Horace Ransome

=== South Australia ===
Three seats were up for election. The Labour Party was defending three seats. Liberal Senator Joseph Vardon, Labour Senator William Russell and Independent Senator Sir Josiah Symon were not up for re-election.

Labour candidates	Liberal candidates
**Robert Guthrie***; **Gregor McGregor***; **William Story***	David Charleston; David Gordon; John Shannon

=== Tasmania ===
Three seats were up for election. The Liberal Party was defending three seats. Liberal Senators Cyril Cameron, John Clemons and John Keating were not up for re-election.

Labour candidates	Liberal candidates	Independent candidates
James Long*; David O'Keefe*; Rudolph Ready*	**Henry Dobson**; **James Macfarlane**; **Edward Mulcahy**	James Campbell

=== Victoria ===
Three seats were up for election. The Liberal Party was defending two seats. The Labour Party was defending one seat. Liberal Senators Simon Fraser and James McColl and Labour Senator Edward Russell were not up for re-election.

Labour candidates	Liberal candidates	Independent candidates
Stephen Barker*; Albert Blakey*; **Edward Findley***	**Robert Best**; James McCay; **William Trenwith**	Vida Goldstein; James Ronald

=== Western Australia ===
Three seats were up for election. The Labour Party was defending three seats. Labour Senators Patrick Lynch, Ted Needham and George Pearce were not up for re-election.

Labour candidates	Liberal candidates
Richard Buzacott*; **Hugh de Largie***; **George Henderson***	Nathaniel Harper; Walter Kingsmill; Archibald Sanderson

== See also ==
- 1910 Australian federal election
- Members of the Australian House of Representatives, 1906–1910
- Members of the Australian House of Representatives, 1910–1913
- Members of the Australian Senate, 1907–1910
- Members of the Australian Senate, 1910–1913
- List of political parties in Australia
