= 1913 Australian House of Representatives election =

Australian federal election, 31 May 1913 House of Representatives << 1910–1914 >>
| Enrolled voters | 2,661,377 | | | | |
| Votes cast | 1,955,723 | | Turnout | 73.49 | +10.69 |
| Informal votes | 55,354 | | Informal | 2.83 | +0.83 |
Summary of votes by party
| Party | Primary votes | % | Swing | Seats | Change |
| Liberal | 930,076 | 48.94% | +3.85% | 38 | + 7 |
| Labor | 921,099 | 48.47% | –1.50% | 37 | – 6 |
| Independent | 49,194 | 2.59% | –2.35% | 0 | – 1 |
| Total | 1,900,369 | | | 75 | |

This is a list of electoral division results for the Australian 1913 federal election.

== New South Wales ==
=== Barrier ===
1913 Australian federal election: Barrier
| Party | Candidate | Votes | % | ±% |
|---|---|---|---|---|
| Labor | Josiah Thomas | 15,047 | 76.8 | +7.6 |
| Liberal | Arthur Harrison | 4,537 | 23.2 | −7.6 |
| Total formal votes | | 19,584 | 96.3 | |
| Informal votes | | 750 | 3.7 | |
| Turnout | | 20,334 | 62.2 | |
| Labor hold | | Swing | +7.6 | |

=== Calare ===
1913 Australian federal election: Calare
| Party | Candidate | Votes | % | ±% |
|---|---|---|---|---|
| Liberal | Henry Pigott | 11,848 | 52.1 | +5.9 |
| Labor | Thomas Brown | 10,911 | 47.9 | −5.9 |
| Total formal votes | | 22,759 | 97.1 | |
| Informal votes | | 691 | 2.9 | |
| Turnout | | 23,450 | 69.0 | |
| Liberal gain from Labor | | Swing | +5.9 | |

=== Cook ===
1913 Australian federal election: Cook
| Party | Candidate | Votes | % | ±% |
|---|---|---|---|---|
| Labor | James Catts | 17,271 | 58.7 | −2.3 |
| Liberal | David Doull | 11,473 | 39.0 | +0.0 |
| Independent | Tom Walsh | 661 | 2.2 | +2.2 |
| Total formal votes | | 29,405 | 96.9 | |
| Informal votes | | 942 | 3.1 | |
| Turnout | | 30,347 | 71.2 | |
| Labor hold | | Swing | −1.1 | |

=== Cowper ===
1913 Australian federal election: Cowper
| Party | Candidate | Votes | % | ±% |
|---|---|---|---|---|
| Liberal | John Thomson | 17,152 | 72.2 | +4.1 |
| Labor | Con Hogan | 6,620 | 27.8 | −0.9 |
| Total formal votes | | 23,772 | 97.6 | |
| Informal votes | | 576 | 2.4 | |
| Turnout | | 24,348 | 66.1 | |
| Liberal hold | | Swing | +2.5 | |

=== Dalley ===
1913 Australian federal election: Dalley
| Party | Candidate | Votes | % | ±% |
|---|---|---|---|---|
| Labor | Robert Howe | 17,520 | 57.7 | +1.1 |
| Liberal | Harry Scott | 12,829 | 42.3 | −1.1 |
| Total formal votes | | 30,349 | 98.3 | |
| Informal votes | | 519 | 1.7 | |
| Turnout | | 30,868 | 74.0 | |
| Labor hold | | Swing | +1.1 | |

=== Darling ===
1913 Australian federal election: Darling
| Party | Candidate | Votes | % | ±% |
|---|---|---|---|---|
| Labor | William Spence | 11,582 | 60.5 | −4.2 |
| Liberal | Edwin Townsend | 7,560 | 39.5 | +4.2 |
| Total formal votes | | 19,142 | 95.3 | |
| Informal votes | | 942 | 4.7 | |
| Turnout | | 20,081 | 62.7 | |
| Labor hold | | Swing | −4.2 | |

=== East Sydney ===
1913 Australian federal election: East Sydney
| Party | Candidate | Votes | % | ±% |
|---|---|---|---|---|
| Labor | John West | 14,174 | 56.1 | −0.1 |
| Liberal | John Willson | 11,077 | 43.9 | +0.1 |
| Total formal votes | | 25,251 | 97.2 | |
| Informal votes | | 733 | 2.8 | |
| Turnout | | 25,984 | 58.0 | |
| Labor hold | | Swing | −0.1 | |

=== Eden-Monaro ===
1913 Australian federal election: Eden-Monaro
| Party | Candidate | Votes | % | ±% |
|---|---|---|---|---|
| Liberal | Austin Chapman | 13,321 | 58.7 | −41.3 |
| Labor | Harry Lestrange | 9,367 | 41.3 | +41.3 |
| Total formal votes | | 22,688 | 97.3 | |
| Informal votes | | 628 | 2.7 | |
| Turnout | | 23,317 | 70.5 | |
| Liberal hold | | Swing | −41.3 | |

=== Gwydir ===
1913 Australian federal election: Gwydir
| Party | Candidate | Votes | % | ±% |
|---|---|---|---|---|
| Labor | William Webster | 11,296 | 52.2 | −7.3 |
| Liberal | John Blackney | 10,348 | 47.8 | +7.3 |
| Total formal votes | | 21,644 | 96.2 | |
| Informal votes | | 851 | 3.8 | |
| Turnout | | 22,495 | 62.2 | |
| Labor hold | | Swing | −7.3 | |

=== Hume ===
1913 Australian federal election: Hume
| Party | Candidate | Votes | % | ±% |
|---|---|---|---|---|
| Liberal | Robert Patten | 11,575 | 50.7 | +16.2 |
| Independent | Sir William Lyne | 11,236 | 49.3 | −9.6 |
| Total formal votes | | 22,811 | 96.4 | |
| Informal votes | | 858 | 3.6 | |
| Turnout | | 23,669 | 68.1 | |
| Liberal gain from Independent | | Swing | +16.2 | |

=== Hunter ===
1913 Australian federal election: Hunter
| Party | Candidate | Votes | % | ±% |
|---|---|---|---|---|
| Labor | Matthew Charlton | 12,884 | 54.5 | −2.4 |
| Liberal | John Fegan | 10,763 | 45.5 | +2.4 |
| Total formal votes | | 23,647 | 98.1 | |
| Informal votes | | 462 | 1.9 | |
| Turnout | | 24,109 | 67.2 | |
| Labor hold | | Swing | −2.4 | |

=== Illawarra ===
1913 Australian federal election: Illawarra
| Party | Candidate | Votes | % | ±% |
|---|---|---|---|---|
| Labor | George Burns | 14,852 | 50.2 | −2.7 |
| Liberal | George Fuller | 14,746 | 49.8 | +2.7 |
| Total formal votes | | 29,598 | 97.4 | |
| Informal votes | | 794 | 2.6 | |
| Turnout | | 30,392 | 77.7 | |
| Labor hold | | Swing | −2.7 | |

=== Lang ===
1913 Australian federal election: Lang
| Party | Candidate | Votes | % | ±% |
|---|---|---|---|---|
| Liberal | Elliot Johnson | 18,293 | 57.1 | +4.7 |
| Labor | Hector Lamond | 13,714 | 42.9 | −4.7 |
| Total formal votes | | 32,007 | 97.0 | |
| Informal votes | | 1,002 | 3.0 | |
| Turnout | | 33,009 | 74.0 | |
| Liberal hold | | Swing | +4.7 | |

=== Macquarie ===
1913 Australian federal election: Macquarie
| Party | Candidate | Votes | % | ±% |
|---|---|---|---|---|
| Labor | Ernest Carr | 11,163 | 50.0 | −9.1 |
| Liberal | Robert Moore | 10,451 | 46.9 | +6.0 |
| Independent | Henry Fletcher | 693 | 3.1 | +3.1 |
| Total formal votes | | 22,307 | 95.6 | |
| Informal votes | | 1,015 | 4.4 | |
| Turnout | | 23,322 | 66.9 | |
| Labor hold | | Swing | −7.5 | |

=== Nepean ===
1913 Australian federal election: Nepean
| Party | Candidate | Votes | % | ±% |
|---|---|---|---|---|
| Liberal | Richard Orchard | 16,322 | 54.2 | −4.7 |
| Labor | George Cann | 12,947 | 43.0 | +2.0 |
| Independent | Alexander Huie | 835 | 2.8 | +2.8 |
| Total formal votes | | 30,104 | 96.7 | |
| Informal votes | | 1,015 | 3.3 | |
| Turnout | | 31,119 | 72.6 | |
| Liberal hold | | Swing | −3.3 | |

=== Newcastle ===
1913 Australian federal election: Newcastle
| Party | Candidate | Votes | % | ±% |
|---|---|---|---|---|
| Labor | David Watkins | 17,865 | 73.8 | −7.6 |
| Liberal | Thomas Collins | 6,334 | 26.2 | +7.6 |
| Total formal votes | | 24,199 | 96.8 | |
| Informal votes | | 812 | 3.2 | |
| Turnout | | 25,011 | 67.6 | |
| Labor hold | | Swing | −7.6 | |

=== New England ===
1913 Australian federal election: New England
| Party | Candidate | Votes | % | ±% |
|---|---|---|---|---|
| Liberal | Percy Abbott | 14,248 | 56.5 | +10.1 |
| Labor | Frank Foster | 10,978 | 43.5 | −8.9 |
| Total formal votes | | 25,226 | 98.1 | |
| Informal votes | | 500 | 1.9 | |
| Turnout | | 25,726 | 72.4 | |
| Liberal gain from Labor | | Swing | +9.5 | |

=== North Sydney ===
1913 Australian federal election: North Sydney
| Party | Candidate | Votes | % | ±% |
|---|---|---|---|---|
| Liberal | Granville Ryrie | 21,639 | 69.1 | +1.8 |
| Labor | Martin Shannon | 9,659 | 30.9 | −0.5 |
| Total formal votes | | 31,298 | 95.4 | |
| Informal votes | | 1,511 | 4.6 | |
| Turnout | | 32,809 | 73.2 | |
| Liberal hold | | Swing | +1.1 | |

=== Parkes ===
1913 Australian federal election: Parkes
| Party | Candidate | Votes | % | ±% |
|---|---|---|---|---|
| Liberal | Bruce Smith | 20,424 | 61.9 | +18.0 |
| Labor | William Russell | 12,546 | 38.1 | +1.4 |
| Total formal votes | | 32,970 | 97.0 | |
| Informal votes | | 1,006 | 3.0 | |
| Turnout | | 33,976 | 75.7 | |
| Liberal hold | | Swing | +8.3 | |

=== Parramatta ===
1913 Australian federal election: Parramatta
| Party | Candidate | Votes | % | ±% |
|---|---|---|---|---|
| Liberal | Joseph Cook | 20,727 | 68.3 | +4.2 |
| Labor | Oscar Zieman | 9,603 | 31.7 | −3.9 |
| Total formal votes | | 30,330 | 96.1 | |
| Informal votes | | 1,227 | 3.9 | |
| Turnout | | 31,557 | 74.4 | |
| Liberal hold | | Swing | +4.0 | |

=== Richmond ===
1913 Australian federal election: Richmond
| Party | Candidate | Votes | % | ±% |
|---|---|---|---|---|
| Liberal | Walter Massy-Greene | 16,954 | 69.9 | +32.3 |
| Labor | Percy Tighe | 7,286 | 30.1 | +15.4 |
| Total formal votes | | 24,240 | 97.9 | |
| Informal votes | | 510 | 2.1 | |
| Turnout | | 24,750 | 71.2 | |
| Liberal hold | | Swing | +15.7 | |

=== Riverina ===
1913 Australian federal election: Riverina
| Party | Candidate | Votes | % | ±% |
|---|---|---|---|---|
| Liberal | Franc Falkiner | 11,674 | 51.0 | +10.0 |
| Labor | John Chanter | 11,208 | 49.0 | −7.2 |
| Total formal votes | | 22,882 | 97.7 | |
| Informal votes | | 550 | 2.3 | |
| Turnout | | 23,432 | 64.8 | |
| Liberal gain from Labor | | Swing | +8.6 | |

=== Robertson ===
1913 Australian federal election: Robertson
| Party | Candidate | Votes | % | ±% |
|---|---|---|---|---|
| Liberal | William Fleming | 12,566 | 55.3 | +4.5 |
| Labor | William Johnson | 10,143 | 44.7 | −4.5 |
| Total formal votes | | 22,709 | 97.2 | |
| Informal votes | | 653 | 2.8 | |
| Turnout | | 23,362 | 70.4 | |
| Liberal hold | | Swing | +4.5 | |

=== South Sydney ===
1913 Australian federal election: South Sydney
| Party | Candidate | Votes | % | ±% |
|---|---|---|---|---|
| Labor | Edward Riley | 17,584 | 65.0 | −4.3 |
| Liberal | Douglas Cooper | 9,489 | 35.0 | +4.3 |
| Total formal votes | | 27,073 | 97.3 | |
| Informal votes | | 750 | 2.7 | |
| Turnout | | 27,823 | 66.4 | |
| Labor hold | | Swing | −4.3 | |

=== Wentworth ===
1913 Australian federal election: Wentworth
| Party | Candidate | Votes | % | ±% |
|---|---|---|---|---|
| Liberal | Willie Kelly | 18,375 | 61.7 | +0.0 |
| Labor | Sydney Green | 11,386 | 38.3 | -0.0 |
| Total formal votes | | 29,761 | 97.1 | |
| Informal votes | | 877 | 2.9 | |
| Turnout | | 30,638 | 71.2 | |
| Liberal hold | | Swing | +0.0 | |

=== Werriwa ===
1913 Australian federal election: Werriwa
| Party | Candidate | Votes | % | ±% |
|---|---|---|---|---|
| Liberal | Alfred Conroy | 13,998 | 55.9 | +6.5 |
| Labor | Richard Corish | 11,062 | 44.1 | −6.5 |
| Total formal votes | | 25,060 | 97.4 | |
| Informal votes | | 682 | 2.6 | |
| Turnout | | 25,742 | 71.5 | |
| Liberal gain from Labor | | Swing | +6.5 | |

=== West Sydney ===
1913 Australian federal election: West Sydney
| Party | Candidate | Votes | % | ±% |
|---|---|---|---|---|
| Labor | Billy Hughes | 17,658 | 71.3 | -0.0 |
| Liberal | John Sutton | 7,119 | 28.7 | +2.9 |
| Total formal votes | | 24,777 | 94.6 | |
| Informal votes | | 1,406 | 5.4 | |
| Turnout | | 26,183 | 64.6 | |
| Labor hold | | Swing | −1.5 | |

== Victoria ==
=== Balaclava ===
1913 Australian federal election: Balaclava
| Party | Candidate | Votes | % | ±% |
|---|---|---|---|---|
| Liberal | Agar Wynne | 18,369 | 65.0 | +0.4 |
| Labor | Louis Holmes | 9,895 | 35.0 | −0.4 |
| Total formal votes | | 28,264 | 98.0 | |
| Informal votes | | 571 | 2.0 | |
| Turnout | | 28,835 | 72.3 | |
| Liberal hold | | Swing | +0.4 | |

=== Ballaarat ===
1913 Australian federal election: Ballaarat
| Party | Candidate | Votes | % | ±% |
|---|---|---|---|---|
| Labor | Charles McGrath | 16,417 | 50.6 | +3.1 |
| Liberal | Hugh McKay | 16,049 | 49.4 | −3.1 |
| Total formal votes | | 32,466 | 98.9 | |
| Informal votes | | 352 | 1.1 | |
| Turnout | | 32,818 | 83.8 | |
| Labor gain from Liberal | | Swing | +3.1 | |

=== Batman ===
1913 Australian federal election: Batman
| Party | Candidate | Votes | % | ±% |
|---|---|---|---|---|
| Labor | Frank Brennan | 19,268 | 64.9 | +2.7 |
| Liberal | Frederick O'Neill | 10,398 | 35.1 | −2.7 |
| Total formal votes | | 29,666 | 98.2 | |
| Informal votes | | 538 | 1.8 | |
| Turnout | | 30,204 | 71.3 | |
| Labor hold | | Swing | +2.7 | |

=== Bendigo ===
1913 Australian federal election: Bendigo
| Party | Candidate | Votes | % | ±% |
|---|---|---|---|---|
| Labor | John Arthur | 14,488 | 50.5 | +2.1 |
| Liberal | Sir John Quick | 13,378 | 46.6 | −5.0 |
| Independent | Cyril James | 821 | 2.9 | +2.9 |
| Total formal votes | | 28,687 | 97.8 | |
| Informal votes | | 639 | 2.2 | |
| Turnout | | 29,326 | 78.6 | |
| Labor gain from Liberal | | Swing | +3.6 | |

=== Bourke ===
1913 Australian federal election: Bourke
| Party | Candidate | Votes | % | ±% |
|---|---|---|---|---|
| Labor | Frank Anstey | 19,225 | 60.0 | +0.8 |
| Liberal | Frank Maldon Robb | 12,806 | 40.0 | −0.8 |
| Total formal votes | | 32,031 | 98.7 | |
| Informal votes | | 421 | 1.3 | |
| Turnout | | 32,452 | 76.9 | |
| Labor hold | | Swing | +0.8 | |

=== Corangamite ===
1913 Australian federal election: Corangamite
| Party | Candidate | Votes | % | ±% |
|---|---|---|---|---|
| Liberal | Chester Manifold | 16,572 | 52.2 | +6.1 |
| Labor | James Scullin | 15,173 | 47.8 | −6.1 |
| Total formal votes | | 31,745 | 99.1 | |
| Informal votes | | 281 | 0.9 | |
| Turnout | | 32,026 | 81.2 | |
| Liberal gain from Labor | | Swing | +6.1 | |

=== Corio ===
1913 Australian federal election: Corio
| Party | Candidate | Votes | % | ±% |
|---|---|---|---|---|
| Liberal | William Kendell | 14,804 | 51.4 | +4.7 |
| Labor | Alfred Ozanne | 13,770 | 47.9 | −5.4 |
| Independent | John Reed | 201 | 0.7 | +0.7 |
| Total formal votes | | 28,775 | 97.5 | |
| Informal votes | | 728 | 2.5 | |
| Turnout | | 29,503 | 76.6 | |
| Liberal gain from Labor | | Swing | +5.1 | |

=== Echuca ===
1913 Australian federal election: Echuca
| Party | Candidate | Votes | % | ±% |
|---|---|---|---|---|
| Liberal | Albert Palmer | 15,618 | 57.6 | +14.0 |
| Labor | Chris Fitzgerald | 9,692 | 35.7 | +25.0 |
| Independent | Egbert England | 1,811 | 6.7 | +6.7 |
| Total formal votes | | 27,121 | 97.4 | |
| Informal votes | | 734 | 2.6 | |
| Turnout | | 27,885 | 74.0 | |
| Liberal hold | | Swing | +10.6 | |

=== Fawkner ===
1913 Australian federal election: Fawkner
| Party | Candidate | Votes | % | ±% |
|---|---|---|---|---|
| Labor | Joseph Hannan | 16,643 | 53.3 | +2.8 |
| Liberal | George Fairbairn | 14,610 | 46.7 | −2.8 |
| Total formal votes | | 31,253 | 97.7 | |
| Informal votes | | 720 | 2.3 | |
| Turnout | | 31,973 | 73.0 | |
| Labor hold | | Swing | +2.8 | |

=== Flinders ===
1913 Australian federal election: Flinders
| Party | Candidate | Votes | % | ±% |
|---|---|---|---|---|
| Liberal | William Irvine | 15,640 | 57.8 | +11.5 |
| Labor | David Russell | 11,418 | 42.2 | +8.4 |
| Total formal votes | | 27,058 | 97.4 | |
| Informal votes | | 714 | 2.6 | |
| Turnout | | 27,772 | 73.1 | |
| Liberal hold | | Swing | +1.5 | |

=== Gippsland ===
1913 Australian federal election: Gippsland
| Party | Candidate | Votes | % | ±% |
|---|---|---|---|---|
| Liberal | James Bennett | 15,473 | 55.0 | +12.7 |
| Independent | George Wise | 12,671 | 45.0 | −12.7 |
| Total formal votes | | 28,144 | 98.4 | |
| Informal votes | | 471 | 1.6 | |
| Turnout | | 28,615 | 75.5 | |
| Liberal gain from Independent | | Swing | +12.7 | |

=== Grampians ===
1913 Australian federal election: Grampians
| Party | Candidate | Votes | % | ±% |
|---|---|---|---|---|
| Liberal | Hans Irvine | 15,414 | 53.9 | +4.1 |
| Labor | Archibald Stewart | 13,191 | 46.1 | −4.1 |
| Total formal votes | | 28,605 | 98.0 | |
| Informal votes | | 580 | 2.0 | |
| Turnout | | 29,185 | 79.5 | |
| Liberal gain from Labor | | Swing | +4.1 | |

=== Henty ===
1913 Australian federal election: Henty
| Party | Candidate | Votes | % | ±% |
|---|---|---|---|---|
| Liberal | James Boyd | 19,138 | 66.3 | +4.6 |
| Labor | William Miles | 9,284 | 32.2 | +7.9 |
| Independent Liberal | Joseph Hewison | 446 | 1.5 | +1.5 |
| Total formal votes | | 28,868 | 97.4 | |
| Informal votes | | 769 | 2.6 | |
| Turnout | | 29,637 | 71.5 | |
| Liberal hold | | Swing | −1.6 | |

=== Indi ===
1913 Australian federal election: Indi
| Party | Candidate | Votes | % | ±% |
|---|---|---|---|---|
| Liberal | Cornelius Ahern | 14,759 | 51.8 | +6.5 |
| Labor | Parker Moloney | 13,653 | 47.9 | +0.2 |
| Independent | Joseph Brown | 67 | 0.2 | +0.2 |
| Total formal votes | | 28,479 | 97.9 | |
| Informal votes | | 609 | 2.1 | |
| Turnout | | 29,088 | 80.1 | |
| Liberal gain from Labor | | Swing | +3.2 | |

=== Kooyong ===
1913 Australian federal election: Kooyong
| Party | Candidate | Votes | % | ±% |
|---|---|---|---|---|
| Liberal | Sir Robert Best | 18,777 | 61.9 | +4.1 |
| Independent | Vida Goldstein | 11,540 | 38.1 | +38.1 |
| Total formal votes | | 30,317 | 98.3 | |
| Informal votes | | 509 | 1.7 | |
| Turnout | | 30,826 | 74.7 | |
| Liberal hold | | Swing | +4.1 | |

=== Maribyrnong ===
1913 Australian federal election: Maribyrnong
| Party | Candidate | Votes | % | ±% |
|---|---|---|---|---|
| Labor | James Fenton | 18,906 | 60.8 | +6.4 |
| Liberal | James Hume Cook | 12,210 | 39.2 | −6.4 |
| Total formal votes | | 31,116 | 98.2 | |
| Informal votes | | 583 | 1.8 | |
| Turnout | | 31,699 | 77.7 | |
| Labor hold | | Swing | +6.4 | |

=== Melbourne ===
1913 Australian federal election: Melbourne
| Party | Candidate | Votes | % | ±% |
|---|---|---|---|---|
| Labor | William Maloney | 18,692 | 71.9 | +4.3 |
| Independent Labor | Ellen Mulcahy | 7,320 | 21.9 | +21.9 |
| Total formal votes | | 26,012 | 95.2 | |
| Informal votes | | 1,313 | 4.8 | |
| Turnout | | 27,325 | 64.4 | |
| Labor hold | | Swing | +4.3 | |

=== Melbourne Ports ===
1913 Australian federal election: Melbourne Ports
| Party | Candidate | Votes | % | ±% |
|---|---|---|---|---|
| Labor | James Mathews | 24,203 | 79.2 | +10.6 |
| Liberal | Charles Merrett | 6,357 | 20.8 | −10.6 |
| Total formal votes | | 30,560 | 97.9 | |
| Informal votes | | 659 | 2.1 | |
| Turnout | | 31,219 | 75.0 | |
| Labor hold | | Swing | +10.6 | |

=== Wannon ===
1913 Australian federal election: Wannon
| Party | Candidate | Votes | % | ±% |
|---|---|---|---|---|
| Liberal | Arthur Rodgers | 16,286 | 54.2 | +7.8 |
| Labor | John McDougall | 13,773 | 45.8 | −7.8 |
| Total formal votes | | 30,059 | 98.5 | |
| Informal votes | | 467 | 1.5 | |
| Turnout | | 30,526 | 83.6 | |
| Liberal gain from Labor | | Swing | +7.8 | |

=== Wimmera ===
1913 Australian federal election: Wimmera
| Party | Candidate | Votes | % | ±% |
|---|---|---|---|---|
| Liberal | Sydney Sampson | 18,030 | 71.0 | +7.6 |
| Labor | Thomas Carey | 7,362 | 29.0 | −6.6 |
| Total formal votes | | 25,392 | 97.9 | |
| Informal votes | | 548 | 2.1 | |
| Turnout | | 25,940 | 73.7 | |
| Liberal hold | | Swing | +7.1 | |

=== Yarra ===
1913 Australian federal election: Yarra
| Party | Candidate | Votes | % | ±% |
|---|---|---|---|---|
| Labor | Frank Tudor | 22,168 | 75.0 | −0.2 |
| Liberal | Edwin Purbrick | 7,398 | 25.0 | +0.2 |
| Total formal votes | | 22,168 | 98.4 | |
| Informal votes | | 471 | 1.6 | |
| Turnout | | 30,037 | 71.5 | |
| Labor hold | | Swing | −0.2 | |

== Queensland ==
=== Brisbane ===
1913 Australian federal election: Brisbane
| Party | Candidate | Votes | % | ±% |
|---|---|---|---|---|
| Labor | William Finlayson | 18,559 | 56.9 | +6.1 |
| Liberal | Osborne Fenwick | 14,050 | 43.1 | −6.1 |
| Total formal votes | | 32,609 | 97.1 | |
| Informal votes | | 977 | 2.9 | |
| Turnout | | 33,586 | 80.8 | |
| Labor hold | | Swing | +6.1 | |

=== Capricornia ===
1913 Australian federal election: Capricornia
| Party | Candidate | Votes | % | ±% |
|---|---|---|---|---|
| Labor | William Higgs | 15,583 | 64.1 | +6.4 |
| Liberal | Francis Dyer | 8,720 | 35.9 | −6.4 |
| Total formal votes | | 24,303 | 97.5 | |
| Informal votes | | 618 | 2.5 | |
| Turnout | | 24,921 | 74.5 | |
| Labor hold | | Swing | +6.4 | |

=== Darling Downs ===
1913 Australian federal election: Darling Downs
| Party | Candidate | Votes | % | ±% |
|---|---|---|---|---|
| Liberal | Littleton Groom | 15,648 | 60.0 | −8.8 |
| Labor | Barnett Allen | 10,451 | 40.0 | +8.8 |
| Total formal votes | | 26,099 | 97.2 | |
| Informal votes | | 741 | 2.8 | |
| Turnout | | 26,840 | 74.6 | |
| Liberal hold | | Swing | −8.8 | |

=== Herbert ===
1913 Australian federal election: Herbert
| Party | Candidate | Votes | % | ±% |
|---|---|---|---|---|
| Labor | Fred Bamford | 16,709 | 58.0 | +0.4 |
| Liberal | John Mann | 12,081 | 42.0 | −0.4 |
| Total formal votes | | 28,790 | 96.1 | |
| Informal votes | | 1,172 | 3.9 | |
| Turnout | | 29,926 | 76.4 | |
| Labor hold | | Swing | +0.4 | |

=== Kennedy ===
1913 Australian federal election: Kennedy
| Party | Candidate | Votes | % | ±% |
|---|---|---|---|---|
| Labor | Charles McDonald | 17,745 | 74.4 | +6.1 |
| Liberal | Owen Edwards | 6,112 | 25.6 | −6.1 |
| Total formal votes | | 23,857 | 95.9 | |
| Informal votes | | 1,013 | 4.1 | |
| Turnout | | 24,870 | 70.7 | |
| Labor hold | | Swing | +6.1 | |

=== Lilley ===
1913 Australian federal election: Lilley
| Party | Candidate | Votes | % | ±% |
|---|---|---|---|---|
| Liberal | Jacob Stumm | 15,729 | 54.7 | −0.1 |
| Labor | Arthur Lilley | 13,010 | 45.3 | +0.1 |
| Total formal votes | | 28,739 | 97.8 | |
| Informal votes | | 638 | 2.2 | |
| Turnout | | 29,377 | 79.3 | |
| Liberal hold | | Swing | −0.1 | |

=== Maranoa ===
1913 Australian federal election: Maranoa
| Party | Candidate | Votes | % | ±% |
|---|---|---|---|---|
| Labor | Jim Page | 13,969 | 65.0 | −4.8 |
| Liberal | Herbert Yeates | 7,516 | 35.0 | +4.8 |
| Total formal votes | | 21,485 | 96.6 | |
| Informal votes | | 752 | 3.4 | |
| Turnout | | 22,237 | 68.6 | |
| Labor hold | | Swing | −4.8 | |

=== Moreton ===
1913 Australian federal election: Moreton
| Party | Candidate | Votes | % | ±% |
|---|---|---|---|---|
| Liberal | Hugh Sinclair | 16,967 | 60.7 | −3.4 |
| Labor | John Sherlock | 10,975 | 39.3 | +3.4 |
| Total formal votes | | 27,942 | 97.5 | |
| Informal votes | | 709 | 2.5 | |
| Turnout | | 28,651 | 80.0 | |
| Liberal hold | | Swing | −3.4 | |

=== Oxley ===
1913 Australian federal election: Oxley
| Party | Candidate | Votes | % | ±% |
|---|---|---|---|---|
| Labor | James Sharpe | 16,744 | 54.4 | +54.4 |
| Liberal | David Hunter | 14,027 | 45.6 | −12.4 |
| Total formal votes | | 30,771 | 98.1 | |
| Informal votes | | 601 | 1.9 | |
| Turnout | | 31,372 | 82.0 | |
| Labor gain from Liberal | | Swing | +12.4 | |

=== Wide Bay ===
1913 Australian federal election: Wide Bay
| Party | Candidate | Votes | % | ±% |
|---|---|---|---|---|
| Labor | Andrew Fisher | 15,702 | 55.6 | −3.3 |
| Liberal | Arnold Wienholt | 12,543 | 44.4 | +3.3 |
| Total formal votes | | 28,245 | 98.4 | |
| Informal votes | | 464 | 1.6 | |
| Turnout | | 28,709 | 84.0 | |
| Labor hold | | Swing | −3.3 | |

== South Australia ==
=== Adelaide ===
1913 Australian federal election: Adelaide
| Party | Candidate | Votes | % | ±% |
|---|---|---|---|---|
| Labor | Ernest Roberts | 15,985 | 66.1 | +2.8 |
| Liberal | James Craig | 7,104 | 29.4 | −7.3 |
| Independent | Edward Craigie | 1,077 | 4.6 | +4.6 |
| Total formal votes | | 24,166 | 93.7 | |
| Informal votes | | 1,626 | 6.3 | |
| Turnout | | 25,792 | 75.9 | |
| Labor hold | | Swing | +5.1 | |

=== Angas ===
1913 Australian federal election: Angas
| Party | Candidate | Votes | % | ±% |
|---|---|---|---|---|
| Liberal | Paddy Glynn | unopposed | | |
| Liberal hold | | Swing | | |

=== Barker ===
1913 Australian federal election: Barker
| Party | Candidate | Votes | % | ±% |
|---|---|---|---|---|
| Liberal | John Livingston | 15,590 | 59.0 | −0.5 |
| Labor | William Sampson | 10,849 | 41.0 | +0.5 |
| Total formal votes | | 26,439 | 95.0 | |
| Informal votes | | 1,392 | 5.0 | |
| Turnout | | 27,831 | 79.7 | |
| Liberal hold | | Swing | −0.5 | |

=== Boothby ===
1913 Australian federal election: Boothby
| Party | Candidate | Votes | % | ±% |
|---|---|---|---|---|
| Labor | George Dankel | 16,976 | 53.0 | −13.8 |
| Liberal | David Gordon | 15,035 | 47.0 | +13.8 |
| Total formal votes | | 32,011 | 96.5 | |
| Informal votes | | 1,158 | 3.5 | |
| Turnout | | 33,169 | 80.5 | |
| Labor gain from Liberal | | Swing | −10.8 | |

=== Grey ===
1913 Australian federal election: Grey
| Party | Candidate | Votes | % | ±% |
|---|---|---|---|---|
| Labor | Alexander Poynton | 12,622 | 52.0 | −48.0 |
| Liberal | Arthur McDonald | 11,642 | 48.0 | +48.0 |
| Total formal votes | | 24,264 | 95.6 | |
| Informal votes | | 1,108 | 4.4 | |
| Turnout | | 25,372 | 78.9 | |
| Labor hold | | Swing | −48.0 | |

=== Hindmarsh ===
1913 Australian federal election: Hindmarsh
| Party | Candidate | Votes | % | ±% |
|---|---|---|---|---|
| Labor | William Archibald | unopposed | | |
| Labor hold | | Swing | | |

=== Wakefield ===
1913 Australian federal election: Wakefield
| Party | Candidate | Votes | % | ±% |
|---|---|---|---|---|
| Liberal | Richard Foster | 14,193 | 53.7 | +3.8 |
| Labor | William Harvey | 12,213 | 46.3 | −2.1 |
| Total formal votes | | 26,406 | 94.8 | |
| Informal votes | | 1,450 | 5.2 | |
| Turnout | | 27,856 | 84.2 | |
| Liberal hold | | Swing | +2.9 | |

== Western Australia ==
=== Dampier ===
1913 Australian federal election: Dampier
| Party | Candidate | Votes | % | ±% |
|---|---|---|---|---|
| Liberal | Henry Gregory | 12,463 | 52.6 | +2.2 |
| Labor | Hugh Mahon | 11,222 | 47.4 | −1.5 |
| Total formal votes | | 23,685 | 96.1 | |
| Informal votes | | 958 | 3.9 | |
| Turnout | | 24,643 | 68.4 | |
| Liberal hold | | Swing | +1.8 | |

=== Fremantle ===
1913 Australian federal election: Fremantle
| Party | Candidate | Votes | % | ±% |
|---|---|---|---|---|
| Labor | Reginald Burchell | 15,428 | 55.8 | +11.4 |
| Liberal | William Hedges | 12,225 | 44.2 | −11.4 |
| Total formal votes | | 27,653 | 96.6 | |
| Informal votes | | 975 | 3.4 | |
| Turnout | | 28,628 | 77.8 | |
| Labor gain from Liberal | | Swing | +11.4 | |

=== Kalgoorlie ===
1913 Australian federal election: Kalgoorlie
| Party | Candidate | Votes | % | ±% |
|---|---|---|---|---|
| Labor | Charlie Frazer | unopposed | | |
| Labor hold | | Swing | | |

=== Perth ===
1913 Australian federal election: Perth
| Party | Candidate | Votes | % | ±% |
|---|---|---|---|---|
| Liberal | James Fowler | 14,846 | 53.3 | −7.9 |
| Labor | Alick McCallum | 13,001 | 46.7 | +7.9 |
| Total formal votes | | 27,847 | 97.1 | |
| Informal votes | | 1,116 | 3.9 | |
| Turnout | | 28,963 | 71.6 | |
| Liberal hold | | Swing | −7.9 | |

=== Swan ===
1913 Australian federal election: Swan
| Party | Candidate | Votes | % | ±% |
|---|---|---|---|---|
| Liberal | Sir John Forrest | 15,055 | 54.9 | −1.4 |
| Labor | Peter O'Loghlen | 12,379 | 45.1 | +1.4 |
| Total formal votes | | 27,434 | 98.6 | |
| Informal votes | | 396 | 1.4 | |
| Turnout | | 27,830 | 76.5 | |
| Liberal hold | | Swing | −1.4 | |

== Tasmania ==
=== Bass ===
1913 Australian federal election: Bass
| Party | Candidate | Votes | % | ±% |
|---|---|---|---|---|
| Labor | Jens Jensen | 7,945 | 52.4 | −4.4 |
| Liberal | Stephen Margetts | 7,212 | 47.6 | +47.6 |
| Total formal votes | | 15,166 | 97.1 | |
| Informal votes | | 457 | 2.9 | |
| Turnout | | 15,623 | 73.4 | |
| Labor hold | | Swing | −4.4 | |

=== Darwin ===
1913 Australian federal election: Darwin
| Party | Candidate | Votes | % | ±% |
|---|---|---|---|---|
| Labor | King O'Malley | 8,312 | 52.1 | −11.2 |
| Liberal | Alexander Marshall | 7,652 | 47.9 | +11.2 |
| Total formal votes | | 15,964 | 97.6 | |
| Informal votes | | 396 | 2.4 | |
| Turnout | | 16,360 | 76.7 | |
| Labor hold | | Swing | −11.2 | |

=== Denison ===
1913 Australian federal election: Denison
| Party | Candidate | Votes | % | ±% |
|---|---|---|---|---|
| Labor | William Laird Smith | 8,943 | 52.5 | −5.6 |
| Liberal | William Trenwith | 7,839 | 46.0 | +4.1 |
| Independent | Alicia O'Shea Petersen | 261 | 1.5 | +1.5 |
| Total formal votes | | 17,043 | 96.3 | |
| Informal votes | | 653 | 3.7 | |
| Turnout | | 17,696 | 76.6 | |
| Labor hold | | Swing | −4.8 | |

=== Franklin ===
1913 Australian federal election: Franklin
| Party | Candidate | Votes | % | ±% |
|---|---|---|---|---|
| Liberal | William McWilliams | 9,202 | 55.8 | +2.4 |
| Labor | William Shoobridge | 7,299 | 44.2 | −2.4 |
| Total formal votes | | 16,501 | 96.8 | |
| Informal votes | | 551 | 3.2 | |
| Turnout | | 17,052 | 76.4 | |
| Liberal hold | | Swing | +2.4 | |

=== Wilmot ===
1913 Australian federal election: Wilmot
| Party | Candidate | Votes | % | ±% |
|---|---|---|---|---|
| Liberal | Llewellyn Atkinson | 8,251 | 62.6 | +6.0 |
| Labor | Henry McFie | 4,922 | 37.4 | −6.0 |
| Total formal votes | | 13,173 | 96.4 | |
| Informal votes | | 494 | 3.6 | |
| Turnout | | 13,667 | 73.0 | |
| Liberal hold | | Swing | +6.0 | |

== See also ==
- Candidates of the 1913 Australian federal election
- Members of the Australian House of Representatives, 1913–1914
- Results of the 1913 Australian federal election (Senate)
