= 1910 Australian federal election =

Election for the 4th Parliament of Australia

- 13 April 1910

All 75 seats in the House of Representatives 38 seats were needed for a majority in the House 18 (of the 36) seats in the Senate
- Registered: 2,267,482 ▲7.49%
- Turnout: 1,349,626 (59.52%) (Note: Turnout in contested seats was 62.80%.) (▲12.04 pp)
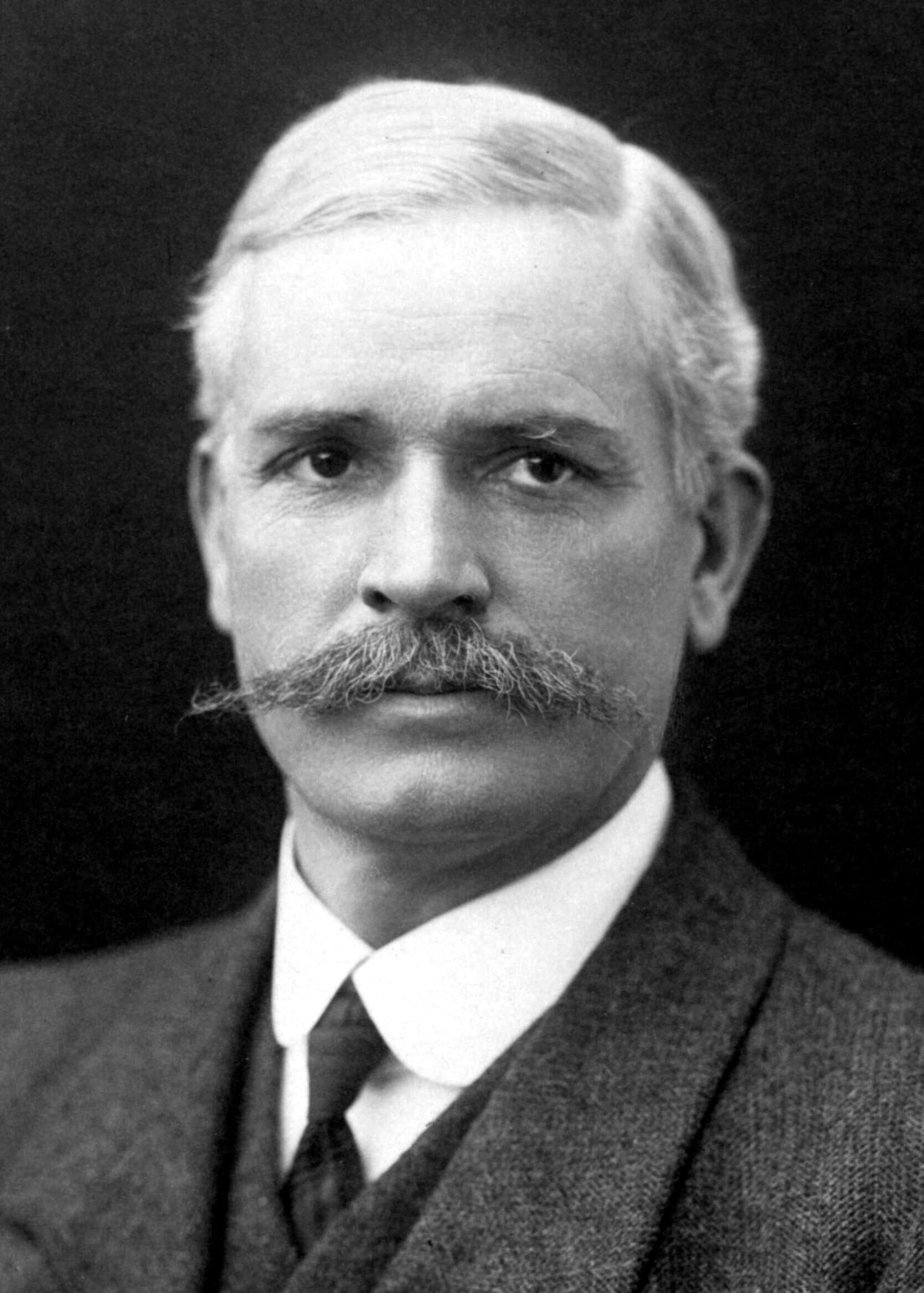

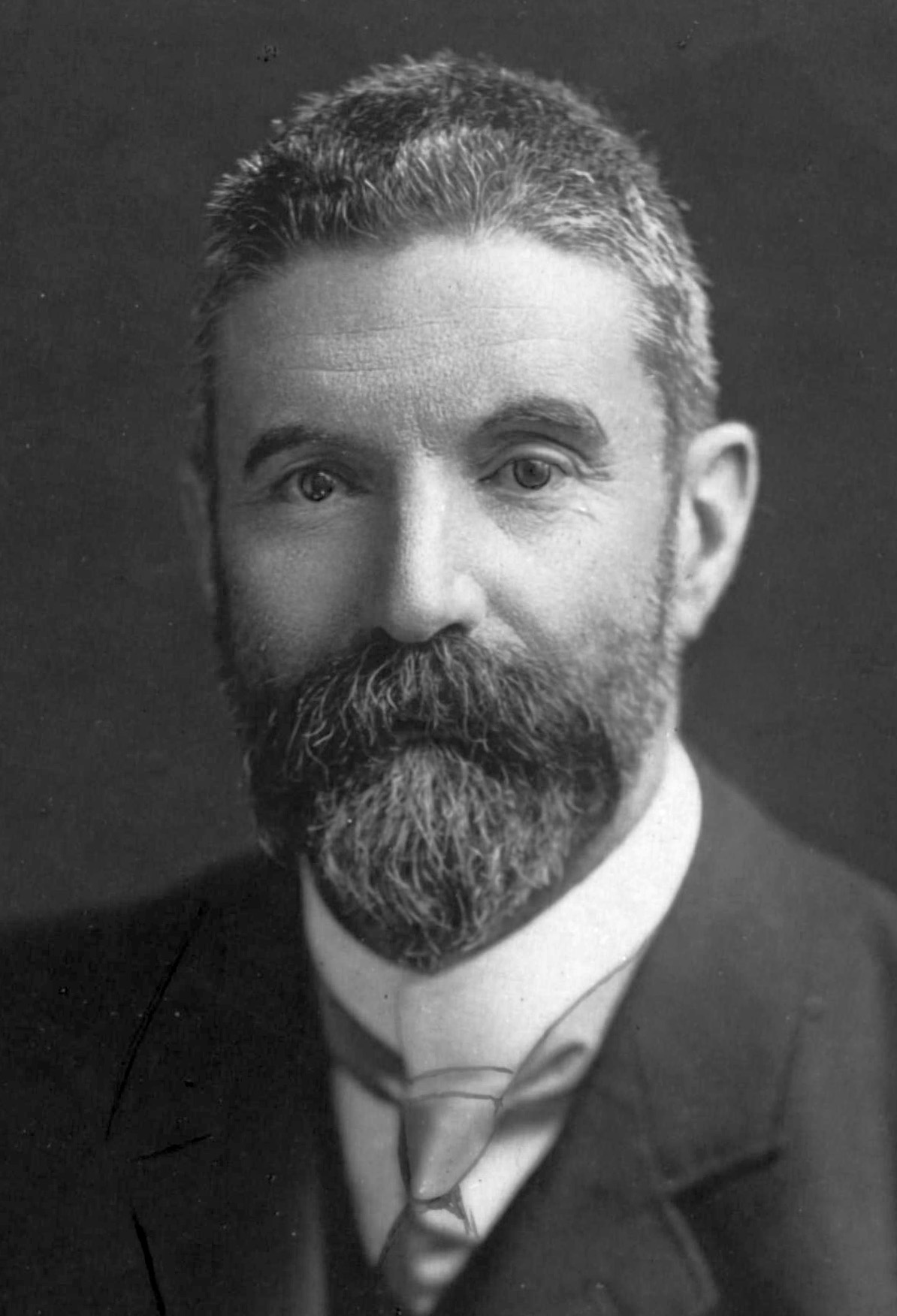
	First party	Second party
Leader	Andrew Fisher	Alfred Deakin
Party	Labour	Liberal
Leader since	30 October 1907	26 May 1909
Leader's seat	Wide Bay (Qld.)	Ballaarat (Vic.)
Last election	26 seats	New party
Seats before	27 seats	42 seats
Seats won	42 seats	31 seats
Seat change	▲15	▼11
Popular vote	649,538	591,248
Percentage	49.12%	44.71%
Swing	▲13.33%	▼8.01
- Results by division for the House of Representatives, shaded by winning party's margin of victory.
Prime Minister before election
Alfred Deakin
Liberal
Subsequent Prime Minister
Andrew Fisher
Labour

The 1910 Australian federal election was held in Australia on 13 April 1910. All 75 seats in the House of Representatives, and 18 of the 36 seats in the Senate were up for election. The incumbent Liberal Party (formed by the fusion of the Protectionist Party and the Anti-Socialist Party in 1909) led by Prime Minister Alfred Deakin was defeated by the opposition Australian Labor Party (ALP) led by Andrew Fisher.

The election represented a number of landmarks: it was Australia's first elected federal majority government; Australia's first elected Senate majority; the world's first labour party majority government at a national level; after the 1904 Chris Watson minority and Fisher's former minority government the world's third labour party government at a national level; the first time it controlled both houses of a bicameral legislature; and the first time that a prime minister, in this case Deakin, was defeated at an election. It also remains the only election in Australia's federal history to have occurred following expiration of a full three-year parliamentary term by the "effluxion of time". This was the first time the Labor Party won a federal election.

Two referendums to approve proposed amendments to the Constitution were held on the same day. The State Debts referendum was carried, but the Surplus Revenue referendum was not carried.

Future Prime Minister James Scullin and future opposition leader Matthew Charlton both entered parliament at this election. Scullin lost his seat at the subsequent 1913 election and did not re-enter parliament until 1922.

== Background ==
After the 1906 election, the House of Representatives first met on 20 February 1907. Prime Minister Alfred Deakin allowed the parliament to run to its maximum permissible length under section 28 of the constitution (three years). Its final meeting ended on 8 December 1909, and it was then prorogued until 19 February 1910 at which point it expired by "effluxion of time". This remains the only occasion to date where the House has been allowed to expire, rather than being dissolved earlier by the Governor-General. The writs for the election were issued on 28 February, producing the longest gap between federal elections in Australian history.

== Results ==
=== House of Representatives ===
Labor: 42 seats Liberal: 31 seats Independent: 2 seats

House of Reps 1910–13 (FPTP) — Turnout 62.80% (Non-CV) — Informal 2.00%
Party	Votes	%	Swing	Seats	Change
Labor	649,538	49.12	+12.48	42	▲16
Liberal	591,248	44.71	−8.01	31	▼11
Socialist Labor	628	0.05	+0.05	0	Steady
Young Australia	590	0.04	+0.04	0	Steady
Independent	80,478	6.09	−2.22	2	▼3
Total	1,322,482			75	
Labor	Win			42	+16
Liberal				31	+31

Notes

- Independents: William Lyne (Hume, NSW), George Wise (Gippsland, Vic)
- Four members were elected unopposed: two Labor and two Liberal.

Popular vote
Labor	49.12%
Liberal	44.71%
Independent/Other	6.17%

Parliament seats
Labor	56.00%
Liberal	41.33%
Independent	2.67%

=== Senate ===
Senate 1910–13 (FPTP BV) — Turnout 62.16% (Non-CV) — Informal N/A
Party	Votes	%	Swing	Seats won	Seats held	Change
Labor	2,021,090	50.30	+11.57	18	22	+7
Liberal	1,830,353	45.55	N/A	0	14	-6
Independents	134,976	3.36	+2.46	0	0	−1
Other	31,700	0.79		0	0	0
Total	4,018,119			18	36	

== Seats changing hands ==
Seat	Pre-1910			Swing	Post-1910		
Seat	Party	Member	Margin	Swing	Margin	Member	Party
Bass, Tas	Liberal	David Storrer	12.3	56.8	6.8	Jens Jensen	Labor
Batman, Vic	Liberal	Jabez Coon	1.3	15.3	13.6	Henry Beard	Labor
Bendigo, Vic	Independent	John Quick	1.7	0.4	1.3	John Quick	Liberal
Bourke, Vic	Liberal	James Hume Cook	2.2	15.3	8.6	Frank Anstey	Labor
Brisbane, Qld	Liberal	Justin Foxton	11.3	12.5	1.2	William Finlayson	Labor
Capricornia, Qld	Liberal	Edward Archer	5.6	12.4	6.8	William Higgs	Labor
Corangamite, Vic	Liberal	Gratton Wilson	24.7	29.4	4.7	James Scullin	Labor
Corio, Vic	Liberal	Richard Crouch	100.0	54.4	4.4	Alfred Ozanne	Labor
Dalley, NSW	Liberal	William Wilks	2.7	9.3	6.6	Robert Howe	Labor
Denison, Tas	Liberal	Philip Fysh	6.5	18.6	8.1	William Laird Smith	Labor
East Sydney, NSW	Liberal	George Reid	4.9	12.0	7.1	John West	Labor
Gippsland, Vic	Liberal	George Wise	100.0	62.1	12.1	George Wise	Independent
Hume, NSW	Liberal	William Lyne	100.0	66.4	16.4	William Lyne	Independent
Hunter, NSW	Liberal	Frank Liddell	0.8	11.7	0.9	Matthew Charlton	Labor
Indi, Vic	Liberal	Joseph Brown	11.0	14.1	3.1	Parker Moloney	Labor
Maribyrnong, Vic	Liberal	Samuel Mauger	6.9	17.7	10.8	James Fenton	Labor
Nepean, NSW	Liberal	Eric Bowden	10.6	14.8	1.5	George Cann	Labor
Perth, WA	Labor	James Fowler	2.7	13.4	10.7	James Fowler	Liberal
Riverina, NSW	Liberal	John Chanter	100.0	57.0	7.0	John Chanter	Labor
Robertson, NSW	Liberal	Henry Willis	7.0	7.9	0.9	William Johnson	Labor

- Members listed in italics did not contest their seat at this election.
- Electorates listed as previously won by a margin of 100% were contested in 1906 as Anti-Socialists v Protectionists (Echuca and Hume) or by two Protectionists (Corio and Gippsland): these parties merged to form the Commonwealth Liberal Party on 26 May 1909.

== Post-election pendulum ==
Government seats
Australian Labor Party
Marginal
Robertson (NSW)	William Johnson	ALP	00.9
Brisbane (Qld)	William Finlayson	ALP	01.2
Nepean (NSW)	George Cann	ALP	01.5
New England (NSW)	Frank Foster	ALP	02.7
Indi (Vic)	Parker Moloney	ALP	03.1
Calare (NSW)	Thomas Brown	ALP	03.6
Wide Bay (Qld)	Andrew Fisher	ALP	04.1
Corio (Vic)	Alfred Ozanne	ALP	04.4
Werriwa (NSW)	David Hall	ALP	04.6
Corangamite (Vic)	James Scullin	ALP	04.7
Wannon (Vic)	John McDougall	ALP	05.0
Fairly safe
Macquarie (NSW)	Ernest Carr	ALP	06.5
Dalley (NSW)	Robert Howe	ALP	06.6
Capricornia (Qld)	William Higgs	ALP	06.8
Bass (Tas)	Jens Jensen	ALP	06.8 vs IND
East Sydney (NSW)	John West	ALP	07.1
Denison (Tas)	William Laird Smith	ALP	08.1
Riverina (NSW)	John Chanter	ALP	08.5
Bourke (Vic)	Frank Anstey	ALP	08.6
Gwydir (NSW)	William Webster	ALP	09.6
Safe
Maribyrnong (Vic)	James Fenton	ALP	10.8
Hunter (NSW)	Matthew Charlton	ALP	10.9
Herbert (Qld)	Fred Bamford	ALP	11.0
Adelaide (SA)	Ernest Roberts	ALP	13.3
Darwin (Tas)	King O'Malley	ALP	13.3
Batman (Vic)	Henry Beard	ALP	13.6
Boothby (SA)	Lee Batchelor	ALP	13.8 vs IND
Cook (NSW)	James Catts	ALP	14.1
Darling (NSW)	William Spence	ALP	14.7
Kennedy (Qld)	Charles McDonald	ALP	14.8
Melbourne (Vic)	William Maloney	ALP	17.0
Melbourne Ports (Vic)	James Mathews	ALP	19.6
Very safe
Maranoa (Qld)	Jim Page	ALP	21.0
West Sydney (NSW)	Billy Hughes	ALP	21.5
South Sydney (NSW)	Edward Riley	ALP	24.1
Coolgardie (WA)	Hugh Mahon	ALP	25.4
Yarra (Vic)	Frank Tudor	ALP	26.1
Newcastle (NSW)	David Watkins	ALP	26.7
Kalgoorlie (WA)	Charlie Frazer	ALP	31.4
Barrier (NSW)	Josiah Thomas	ALP	35.8
Grey (SA)	Alexander Poynton	ALP	unopposed
Hindmarsh (SA)	William Archibald	ALP	unopposed

Non-government seats
Liberal Party
Marginal
Echuca (Vic)	Albert Palmer	LIB	00.4 vs IND
Grampians (Vic)	Hans Irvine	LIB	00.4
Laanecoorie (Vic)	Carty Salmon	LIB	00.8
Wakefield (SA)	Richard Foster	LIB	00.8
Lang (NSW)	Elliot Johnson	LIB	01.0
Ballaarat (Vic)	Alfred Deakin	LIB	01.1
Bendigo (Vic)	John Quick	LIB	01.3
Mernda (Vic)	Robert Harper	LIB	01.8
Illawarra (NSW)	George Fuller	LIB	02.0
Franklin (Tas)	William McWilliams	LIB	03.4
Richmond (NSW)	Walter Massy-Greene	LIB	04.2 vs IND
Fremantle (WA)	William Hedges	LIB	04.5
Parkes (NSW)	Bruce Smith	LIB	05.1
Fairly safe
Kooyong (Vic)	William Knox	LIB	06.3 vs IND
Wilmot (Tas)	Llewellyn Atkinson	LIB	06.6
Flinders (Vic)	William Irvine	LIB	08.1
Fawkner (Vic)	George Fairbairn	LIB	08.9
Barker (SA)	John Livingston	LIB	09.5
Safe
Swan (WA)	John Forrest	LIB	10.2
Perth (WA)	James Fowler	LIB	10.7
Wentworth (NSW)	Willie Kelly	LIB	11.0
Moreton (Qld)	Hugh Sinclair	LIB	11.1
Balaclava (Vic)	Agar Wynne	LIB	12.0
Oxley (Qld)	Richard Edwards	LIB	12.2 vs IND
North Sydney (NSW)	George Edwards	LIB	15.8
Wimmera (Vic)	Sydney Sampson	LIB	16.0
Parramatta (NSW)	Joseph Cook	LIB	18.0
Cowper (NSW)	John Thomson	LIB	19.5
Darling Downs (Qld)	Littleton Groom	LIB	19.9
Very safe
Angas (SA)	Paddy Glynn	LIB	unopposed
Eden-Monaro (NSW)	Austin Chapman	LIB	unopposed
Independents
Gippsland (Vic)	George Wise	IND	12.1 vs LIB
Hume (NSW)	William Lyne	IND	16.4 vs LIB

== See also ==
- Candidates of the 1910 Australian federal election
- Members of the Australian House of Representatives, 1910–1913
- Members of the Australian Senate, 1910–1913

== Notes ==
Notes

Citations
