= Elizee De Garis =

Australian irrigationist

Elisha Clement "Elizee" De Garis (17 September 1851 – 2 July 1948) was an Australian irrigationist.

De Garis was born at Saint Martin in Guernsey in the Channel Islands to carpenter Elisha De Garis and Mary, née Roberts. In 1854 the De Garises migrated to Australia, settling in Adelaide and then Naracoorte. The young Elisha attended the Collegiate School of St Peter before moving to Melbourne in 1872 to study architecture. Ordained in the Wesleyan Methodist Church in 1880, he married Elizabeth Buncle on 2 February 1881 and was formally ordained as a minister in 1882 for Durham Ox and Kerang. He became known as a supporter of Hugh McColl's irrigation schemes and was appointed irrigation correspondent for the Melbourne Daily Telegraph; he was appointed inaugural chairman of the Tragowel Plains Irrigation and Water Supply Trust and also served as chairman of the Central Irrigation League, editing the Australian Irrigationist and founding the Associated Australian Yeomanry.

In 1888, De Garis was a commissioner of the Melbourne Centennial International Exhibition, having formally renounced the cloth in 1887 (although he continued as a lay preacher). He established a market garden at Werribee with George Chaffey but in 1891 moved to Mildura, where he was one of the founders of the Australian Dried Fruits Association and president of Mildura Shire Council (1907–08). He returned to Melbourne in 1908, leaving his son Jack to manage his Mildura affairs. Elected to Moorabbin Shire Council in 1909, he ran unsuccessfully for the state seat of Brighton in 1909 and the federal seat of Yarra in 1910 for the Liberal Party. He spent time in Guernsey from 1916 to 1919; his wife died in 1918 and he remarried Mary Evaleen Waugh on 23 April 1919 at Auburn. He died in 1948.
