= Henry Willis (politician) =

Australian politician (1860–1950)

The Honourable Henry Willis
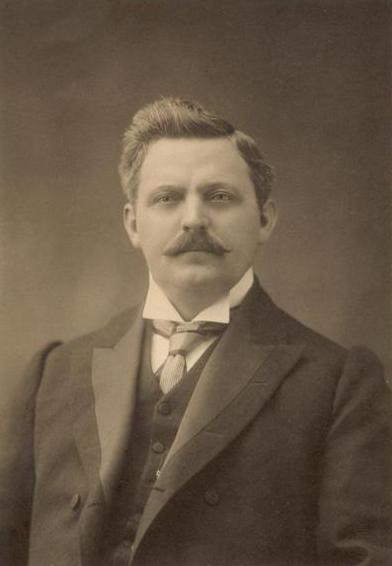

Member of the Australian Parliament for Robertson
- In office 29 March 1901 – 13 April 1910
- Preceded by: New seat
- Succeeded by: William Johnson

Personal details
- Born: 6 April 1860 Port Adelaide, South Australia
- Died: 23 February 1950 (aged 89) Middle Harbour
- Party: Free Trade (1901–1906); Anti-Socialist (1906–1909); Liberal (1909–1913)
- Occupation: Tanner

Henry Willis (6 April 1860 – 23 February 1950) was an Australian politician, born in Port Adelaide, South Australia to English mariner John Willis and Jane, née Emmerson. Having been locally educated, Willis worked at his father's tannery, and in 1884 became a committee member of the South Australian Literary Societies' Union. The following year he had established his own tannery and was serving on the local board of health and Hindmarsh Municipal Council.

== Municipal politics ==
Willis relocated to Sydney in 1888, intending to become a minister in the Church of England. He married Annie Louisa Moore at Campbelltown on 20 September 1889, with whom he had five children. He was the first mayor of Cabramatta and Canley Vale in 1893 and served on Camden (1897–1899) and Randwick (1899–1902) councils. He was unsuccessful as an independent Free Trade candidate at the 1894 election for the district of Sydney-Denison, and at the 1898 election for the district of Camden.

== Federal politics ==
Willis was elected to the Australian House of Representatives in 1901, as the Free Trade member for Robertson. He remained in this position until 1910, when he was defeated.

== State politics ==
Shortly after his defeat in 1910, Willis stood as the Liberal Party candidate for the New South Wales Legislative Assembly seat of Upper Hunter, which he won with 51.85% of the vote.

When Labor lost the majority in the Assembly in July 1911 it appointed Willis, who, as an Opposition member, had offered himself to avoid a dissolution, as Speaker. His Liberal colleagues accused him of betraying his party, some even calling him "Judas" and a "political leper". Having embraced Robert Lowe's ideals, Willis became a more active Speaker, claiming authority to remove members, censor their speeches and questions, and exclude journalists from the press gallery. He also completely reformed the Speaker's office and staff, but most of these reforms were ephemeral.

Willis's measures angered both Liberal and Labor members; once, he even summoned the police to eject seven Liberals from the House. He incurred several civil actions for assault and illegal ejection (John Perry's 1911 action was successful), and was labelled a "petty Napoleon". He became increasingly unpopular, constantly lampooned in the press, and almost hated within the House. He resigned the Speakership on 22 July 1913, and was defeated as an independent Liberal at the 1913 election.

His last appearance in politics was as an unsuccessful Labor candidate for the state seat of North Shore in 1920.

== Later life ==
Willis personified the Victorian ideal of the "cultivated" gentleman, and was noted for his parliamentary eloquence. He possessed four estates, one of them in Queensland. Willis died at his home at Middle Harbour on 23 February 1950, and was survived by his wife, a son and two daughters. At the time of his death, Willis was one of the last surviving members of the First Parliament, with only William Higgs, Sir George Pearce, Billy Hughes and King O'Malley outliving him.

Parliament of Australia
New division	Member for Robertson; 1901–1910	Succeeded by William Johnson
New South Wales Legislative Assembly
Preceded by William Ashford	Member for Upper Hunter; 1910–1913	Succeeded by Mac Abbott
Preceded by John Cann	Speaker of the New South Wales Legislative Assembly; 1911–1913	Succeeded by Henry Morton
