= Young Australia National Party =

Former Australian political party

The Young Australia National Party (YANP), later the Young Australia Party (YAP), was a minor Australian political party that operated in the 1910s.

The party was founded in 1909 by John Boyd Steel, a Labour Party member who supported the unification of Australia's states. Although the party failed to make much headway at the 1910 federal election, the party did establish a nationwide presence and its cause was supported by Queensland Labor senator Fred Bamford. The party changed its name to the Young Australia Party in 1911 and announced the four points of its platform as unification, White Australia, compulsory defence, and transcontinental railways.

The Labor Party adopted unification as part of its platform after Billy Hughes succeeded Andrew Fisher as party leader, and the YAP faded out of existence. It was not connected with Greg McGirr's Young Australia Party of 1925.
