= William Johnson (Australian politician) =

Australian politician

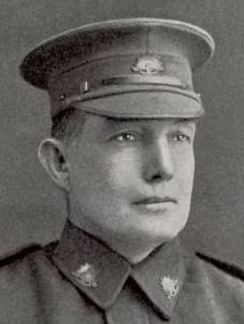

Member of the Australian Parliament for Robertson
- In office 13 April 1910 – 31 May 1913
- Preceded by: Henry Willis
- Succeeded by: William Fleming

Mayor of Auburn
- In office 9 February 1914 – 3 February 1916
- Preceded by: George Ritchie
- Succeeded by: Tom Cheetham

Personal details
- Born: 1871 Yass, Colony of New South Wales, British Empire
- Died: 30 July 1916 (aged 44–45) Étaples, Pas-de-Calais, France
- Cause of death: Died of wounds
- Party: Labor
- Occupation: Coachbuilder; Soldier; Politician

Military service
- Allegiance: Australia
- Branch/service: Australian Army
- Years of service: 1915–1916
- Rank: Private
- Unit: 2nd Battalion
- Battles/wars: World War I • Battle of the Somme

William James Johnson (1871 – 30 July 1916) was an Australian politician and soldier.

Born in Yass, New South Wales, he received a primary education before becoming a coachbuilder. He was involved in local politics as a member of Auburn Council. In 1910, he was elected to the Australian House of Representatives as the Labor member for Robertson, defeating Henry Willis. He held the seat until 1913, when he was defeated by William Fleming, representing the Commonwealth Liberal Party.

Johnson enlisted as a Private on 14 August 1915 and served in the Second Battalion in France. While there, his Division was addressed by then Prime Minister of Australia Billy Hughes and former Prime Minister Andrew Fisher, then serving as Australian High Commissioner to Britain, and Hughes recognised Johnson in the crowd. The former colleagues were seen laughing and reminiscing for some time. Johnson was wounded at Pozières, and died of his wounds in Étaples on 30 July 1916.

Parliament of Australia
| Preceded by Henry Willis | Member for Robertson; 1910–1913 | Succeeded by William Fleming |
Civic offices
| Preceded by George Ritchie | Mayor of Auburn; 1914–1916 | Succeeded by Tom Cheetham |
