= Candidates of the 1913 Australian federal election =

This article provides information on candidates who stood for the 1913 Australian federal election. The election was held on 31 May 1913.

== By-elections, appointments and defections ==
=== By-elections and appointments ===
- On 24 August 1910, Sir Robert Best (Liberal) was elected to replace William Knox (Liberal) as the member for Kooyong.
- On 8 February 1911, Frank Brennan (Labour) was elected to replace Henry Beard (Labour) as the member for Batman.
- On 11 March 1911, Granville Ryrie (Liberal) was elected to replace George Edwards (Liberal) as the member for North Sydney.
- On 11 November 1911, David Gordon (Liberal) was elected to replace Lee Batchelor (Labour) as the member for Boothby.
- On 1 June 1912, Benjamin Bennett (Labor) was elected to replace David Hall (Labor) as the member for Werriwa.
- On 31 July 1912, John Shannon (Liberal) was appointed as a South Australian Senator to replace William Russell (Labor).

=== Defections ===
- Liberal Senator Cyril Cameron (Tasmania) lost pre-selection and contested the election as an independent.

== Redistributions and seat changes ==
- Redistributions of electoral boundaries occurred in New South Wales, Victoria, Queensland and Western Australia.
  - In New South Wales, no seats were created or abolished. The Liberal-held seat of Illawarra became notionally Labor, while the Labor-held seats of Nepean and Robertson became notionally Liberal.
  - In Victoria, Laanecoorie and Mernda (both Liberal-held) were abolished and Henty (notionally Liberal) was created. The Liberal-held seats of Fawkner and Grampians became notionally Labor.
    - The member for Laanecoorie, Carty Salmon (Liberal), contested the Senate.
  - In Queensland, the seat of Lilley (notionally Liberal) was created.
  - In Western Australia, Coolgardie was renamed Dampier.
    - The member for Coolgardie, Hugh Mahon (Labor), contested Dampier.

== Retiring Members and Senators ==
=== Labor ===
- Benjamin Bennett MP (Werriwa, NSW)

=== Liberal ===
- Alfred Deakin MP (Ballaarat, Vic)
- Richard Edwards MP (Oxley, Qld)
- Robert Harper MP (Mernda, Vic)
- Senator Simon Fraser (Vic)
- Senator James Walker (NSW)

== House of Representatives ==
Sitting members at the time of the election are shown in bold text. Successful candidates are highlighted in the relevant colour. Where there is possible confusion, an asterisk (*) is also used.

=== New South Wales ===
Electorate	Held by	Labor candidate	Liberal candidate	Other candidates
Barrier	Labor	**Josiah Thomas**	Arthur Harrison	
Calare	Labor	**Thomas Brown**	Henry Pigott	
Cook	Labor	**James Catts**	David Doull	Tom Walsh (Soc Lab)
Cowper	Liberal	Con Hogan	**John Thomson**	
Dalley	Labor	**Robert Howe**	Harry Scott	
Darling	Labor	**William Spence**	Edwin Townsend	
East Sydney	Labor	**John West**	John Willson	
Eden-Monaro	Liberal	Harry Lestrange	**Austin Chapman**	
Gwydir	Labor	**William Webster**	John Blackney	
Hume	Independent		Robert Patten	**Sir William Lyne** (Ind)
Hunter	Labor	**Matthew Charlton**	John Fegan	
Illawarra	Labor	George Burns	**George Fuller**	
Lang	Liberal	Hector Lamond	**Elliot Johnson**	
Macquarie	Labor	**Ernest Carr**	Robert Moore	Henry Fletcher (Ind)
Nepean	Liberal	**George Cann**	Richard Orchard	Alexander Huie (Ind)
Newcastle	Labor	**David Watkins**	Thomas Collins	
New England	Labor	**Frank Foster**	Percy Abbott	
North Sydney	Liberal	Martin Shannon	**Granville Ryrie**	
Parkes	Liberal	William Russell	**Bruce Smith**	
Parramatta	Liberal	Oscar Zieman	**Joseph Cook**	
Richmond	Liberal	Percy Tighe	**Walter Massy-Greene**	
Riverina	Labor	**John Chanter**	Franc Falkiner	
Robertson	Liberal	**William Johnson**	William Fleming	
South Sydney	Labor	**Edward Riley**	Douglas Cooper	
Wentworth	Liberal	Sydney Green	**Willie Kelly**	
Werriwa	Labor	Richard Corish	Alfred Conroy	
West Sydney	Labor	**Billy Hughes**	John Sutton	

=== Queensland ===
Electorate	Held by	Labor candidate	Liberal candidate
Brisbane	Labor	**William Finlayson**	Osborne Fenwick
Capricornia	Labor	**William Higgs**	Francis Dyer
Darling Downs	Liberal	Frank Allen	**Littleton Groom**
Herbert	Labor	**Fred Bamford**	John Mann
Kennedy	Labor	**Charles McDonald**	Owen Edwards
Lilley	Liberal	Arthur Lilley	Jacob Stumm
Maranoa	Labor	**Jim Page**	Herbert Yeates
Moreton	Liberal	John Sherlock	**Hugh Sinclair**
Oxley	Liberal	James Sharpe	David Hunter
Wide Bay	Labor	**Andrew Fisher**	Arnold Wienholt

=== South Australia ===
Electorate	Held by	Labor candidate	Liberal candidate	Independent candidate(s)
Adelaide	Labor	**Ernest Roberts**	James Craig	Edward Craigie
Angas	Liberal		**Paddy Glynn**	
Barker	Liberal	William Sampson	**John Livingston**	
Boothby	Liberal	George Dankel	**David Gordon**	
Grey	Labor	**Alexander Poynton**	Arthur McDonald	
Hindmarsh	Labor	**William Archibald**		
Wakefield	Liberal	William Harvey	**Richard Foster**	

=== Tasmania ===
Electorate	Held by	Labor candidate	Liberal candidate	Independent candidate(s)
Bass	Labor	**Jens Jensen**	Stephen Margetts	
Darwin	Labor	**King O'Malley**	Alexander Marshall	
Denison	Labor	**William Laird Smith**	William Trenwith	Alicia O'Shea Petersen
Franklin	Liberal	William Shoobridge	**William McWilliams**	
Wilmot	Liberal	Henry McFie	**Llewellyn Atkinson**	

=== Victoria ===
Electorate	Held by	Labor candidate	Liberal candidate	Other candidates
Balaclava	Liberal	Louis Holmes	**Agar Wynne**	
Ballaarat	Liberal	Charles McGrath	Hugh McKay	
Batman	Labor	**Frank Brennan**	Frederick O'Neill	
Bendigo	Liberal	John Arthur	**Sir John Quick**	Cyril James (Ind)
Bourke	Labor	**Frank Anstey**	Frank Maldon Robb	
Corangamite	Labor	**James Scullin**	Chester Manifold	
Corio	Labor	**Alfred Ozanne**	William Kendell	John Reed (Ind)
Echuca	Liberal	Chris Fitzgerald	**Albert Palmer**	Egbert England (Ind)
Fawkner	Labor	Joseph Hannan	**George Fairbairn**	
Flinders	Liberal	David Russell	**William Irvine**	
Gippsland	Independent		James Bennett	**George Wise** (Ind)
Grampians	Labor	Archibald Stewart	**Hans Irvine**	
Henty	Liberal	William Miles	James Boyd	Joseph Hewison (Ind Lib)
Indi	Labor	**Parker Moloney**	Cornelius Ahern	Joseph Brown (Ind)
Kooyong	Liberal		**Sir Robert Best**	Vida Goldstein (Ind)
Maribyrnong	Labor	**James Fenton**	James Hume Cook	
Melbourne	Labor	**William Maloney**		Ellen Mulcahy (Ind Lab)
Melbourne Ports	Labor	**James Mathews**	Charles Merrett	
Wannon	Labor	**John McDougall**	Arthur Rodgers	
Wimmera	Liberal	Thomas Carey	**Sydney Sampson**	
Yarra	Labor	**Frank Tudor**	Edwin Purbrick	

=== Western Australia ===
Electorate	Held by	Labor candidate	Liberal candidate
Dampier	Liberal	**Hugh Mahon**	Henry Gregory
Fremantle	Liberal	Reginald Burchell	**William Hedges**
Kalgoorlie	Labor	**Charlie Frazer**	
Perth	Liberal	Alick McCallum	**James Fowler**
Swan	Liberal	Peter O'Loghlen	**Sir John Forrest**

== Senate ==
Sitting senators are shown in bold text. Tickets that elected at least one Senator are highlighted in the relevant colour. Successful candidates are identified by an asterisk (*).

=== New South Wales ===
Three seats were up for election. The Liberal Party was defending three seats. Labor Senators Albert Gardiner, Allan McDougall and Arthur Rae were not up for re-election.

Labor candidates	Liberal candidates	Socialist Labor candidates
John Grant; Ike Smith; David Watson	**Sir Albert Gould***; **Edward Millen***; Charles Oakes*	Tom Batho; James Moroney; Henry Ostler

=== Queensland ===
Three seats were up for election. The Liberal Party was defending three seats. Labor Senators Thomas Givens, James Stewart and Harry Turley were not up for re-election.

Labor candidates	Liberal candidates
Myles Ferricks*; William Maughan*; John Mullan*	**Thomas Chataway**; **Robert Sayers**; **Anthony St Ledger**

=== South Australia ===
Three seats were up for election. The Liberal Party was defending three seats. Labor Senators Robert Guthrie, Gregor McGregor and William Story were not up for re-election.

Labor candidates	Liberal candidates	Independent candidates
John Newlands*; James O'Loghlin*; William Senior*	Peter Allen; **John Shannon**; **Joseph Vardon**	**Sir Josiah Symon**

=== Tasmania ===
Three seats were up for election. The Liberal Party was defending three seats. Labor Senators James Long, David O'Keefe and Rudolph Ready were not up for re-election.

Labor candidates	Liberal candidates	Independent candidates
James Guy; James Hurst; James Ogden	Thomas Bakhap*; **John Clemons***; **John Keating***	**Cyril Cameron**

=== Victoria ===
Three seats were up for election. The Liberal Party was defending two seats. The Labor Party was defending one seat. Labor Senators Stephen Barker, Albert Blakey and Edward Findley were not up for re-election.

Labor candidates	Liberal candidates	Independent candidates
John Barnes*; Andrew McKissock; **Edward Russell***	**James McColl***; Samuel Mauger; Carty Salmon	William Renwick

=== Western Australia ===
Three seats were up for election. The Labor Party was defending three seats. Labor Senators Richard Buzacott, Hugh de Largie and George Henderson were not up for re-election.

Labor candidates	Liberal candidates
**Patrick Lynch***; **Ted Needham***; **George Pearce***	William Butcher; Charles Davies; William Nairn

== See also ==
- 1913 Australian federal election
- Members of the Australian House of Representatives, 1910–1913
- Members of the Australian House of Representatives, 1913–1914
- Members of the Australian Senate, 1910–1913
- Members of the Australian Senate, 1913–1914
- List of political parties in Australia
