= Electoral results for the Division of Grampians =

Australian division election results

This is a list of electoral results for the Division of Grampians in Australian federal elections from the division's creation in 1901 until its abolition in 1922.

== Members ==
Member	Party	Term
Thomas Skene	Free Trade/Anti-Socialist	1901–1906
Hans Irvine	Anti-Socialist	1906–1909
Hans Irvine	Liberal	1909–1914
Edward Jolley	Labor	1914–1915
Carty Salmon	Liberal	1915–1917
Carty Salmon	Nationalist	1917–1917
Edmund Jowett	Nationalist	1917–1919
Edmund Jowett	Victorian Farmers/Country	1919–1922

== Election results ==
=== Elections in the 1910s ===
==== 1919 ====
1919 Australian federal election: Grampians
Party	Candidate	Votes	%	±%
Victorian Farmers	Edmund Jowett	13,736	58.2	+58.2
Labor	Mark Lazarus	9,855	41.8	−1.2
Total formal votes		23,591	98.6	
Informal votes		343	1.4	
Turnout		23,934	78.2	
Victorian Farmers gain from Nationalist		Swing	+1.2	

1917 Grampians by-election
Party	Candidate	Votes	%	±%
Nationalist	Edmund Jowett	11,232	54.8	−2.2
Labor	David Russell	9,265	45.2	+2.2
Total formal votes		20,497	99.5	
Informal votes		109	0.5	
Turnout		20,606	65.7	
Nationalist hold		Swing	−2.2	

==== 1917 ====
1917 Australian federal election: Grampians
Party	Candidate	Votes	%	±%
Nationalist	Carty Salmon	15,089	57.0	+7.3
Labor	John McDougall	11,390	43.0	−7.3
Total formal votes		26,479	98.1	
Informal votes		509	1.9	
Turnout		26,988	84.4	
Nationalist hold		Swing	+7.3	

1915 Grampians by-election
Party	Candidate	Votes	%	±%
Liberal	Carty Salmon	12,116	51.3	+1.6
Labor	John McDougall	11,522	48.7	−1.6
Total formal votes		23,638	99.5	
Informal votes		120	0.5	
Turnout		23,758	67.9	
Liberal gain from Labor		Swing	+1.6	

==== 1914 ====
1914 Australian federal election: Grampians
Party	Candidate	Votes	%	±%
Labor	Edward Jolley	14,694	50.3	+4.2
Liberal	Hans Irvine	14,517	49.7	−4.2
Total formal votes		29,211	98.3	
Informal votes		495	1.7	
Turnout		29,706	85.5	
Labor gain from Liberal		Swing	+4.2	

==== 1913 ====
1913 Australian federal election: Grampians
Party	Candidate	Votes	%	±%
Liberal	Hans Irvine	15,414	53.9	+4.1
Labor	Archibald Stewart	13,191	46.1	−4.1
Total formal votes		28,605	98.0	
Informal votes		580	2.0	
Turnout		29,185	79.5	
Liberal gain from Labor		Swing	+4.1	

==== 1910 ====
1910 Australian federal election: Grampians
Party	Candidate	Votes	%	±%
Liberal	Hans Irvine	9,000	50.4	−5.4
Labour	Archibald Stewart	8,857	49.6	+5.4
Total formal votes		17,857	98.4	
Informal votes		294	1.6	
Turnout		18,151	65.5	
Liberal hold		Swing	−5.4	

=== Elections in the 1900s ===
==== 1906 ====
1906 Australian federal election: Grampians
Party	Candidate	Votes	%	±%
Anti-Socialist	Hans Irvine	7,598	55.8	+19.5
Labour	Edward Grayndler	6,013	44.2	+18.3
Total formal votes		13,611	95.6	
Informal votes		633	4.4	
Turnout		14,244	50.5	
Anti-Socialist hold		Swing	+3.2	

==== 1903 ====
1903 Australian federal election: Grampians
Party	Candidate	Votes	%	±%
Free Trade	Thomas Skene	3,836	36.3	−12.7
Protectionist	Archibald Ritchie	3,285	31.1	−5.7
Labour	Patrick McGrath	2,735	25.9	+25.9
Independent Labour	Albert Andrews	722	6.9	+6.9
Total formal votes		10,578	97.7	
Informal votes		254	2.3	
Turnout		10,832	49.8	
Free Trade hold		Swing	−3.5	

==== 1901 ====
1901 Australian federal election: Grampians
Party	Candidate	Votes	%	±%
Free Trade	Thomas Skene	2,576	49.0	+49.0
Protectionist	Alfred Rinder	1,934	36.8	+36.8
Ind. Protectionist	Holford Wettenhall	745	14.2	+14.2
Total formal votes		5,255	99.0	
Informal votes		54	1.0	
Turnout		5,309	49.4	
Free Trade win		(new seat)		
