= Members of the Australian House of Representatives, 1917–1919 =

This is a list of the members of the Australian House of Representatives in the Seventh Australian Parliament, which was elected at the 1917 election on 5 May 1917.

Member	Party	Electorate	State	In office
Percy Abbott	Nationalist	New England	NSW	1913–1919
Frank Anstey	Labor	Bourke	Vic	1910–1934
William Archibald	Nationalist	Hindmarsh	SA	1910–1919
Llewellyn Atkinson	Nationalist	Wilmot	Tas	1906–1929
Fred Bamford	Nationalist	Herbert	Qld	1901–1925
James Bayley	Nationalist	Oxley	Qld	1917–1931
Sir Robert Best	Nationalist	Kooyong	Vic	1910–1922
Arthur Blakeley	Labor	Darling	NSW	1917–1934
James Boyd	Nationalist	Henty	Vic	1913–1919
Frank Brennan	Labor	Batman	Vic	1911–1931, 1934–1949
Stanley Bruce	Nationalist	Flinders	Vic	1918–1929, 1931–1933
Reginald Burchell	Nationalist	Fremantle	WA	1913–1922
James Catts	Labor	Cook	NSW	1906–1922
John Chanter	Nationalist	Riverina	NSW	1901–1903, 1904–1913, 1914–1922
Austin Chapman	Nationalist	Eden-Monaro	NSW	1901–1926
Matthew Charlton	Labor	Hunter	NSW	1910–1928
Michael Considine	Labor/Independent	Barrier	NSW	1917–1922
Joseph Cook	Nationalist	Parramatta	NSW	1901–1921
Edward Corser	Nationalist	Wide Bay	Qld	1915–1928
Franc Falkiner	Nationalist	Hume	NSW	1913–1914, 1917–1919
James Fenton	Labor	Maribyrnong	Vic	1910–1934
William Finlayson	Labor	Brisbane	Qld	1910–1919
William Fleming	Nationalist	Robertson	NSW	1913–1922
Sir John Forrest	Nationalist	Swan	WA	1901–1918
Richard Foster	Nationalist	Wakefield	SA	1909–1928
James Fowler	Nationalist	Perth	WA	1901–1922
William Gibson	Victorian Farmers	Corangamite	Vic	1918–1929, 1931–1934
Paddy Glynn	Nationalist	Angas	SA	1901–1919
Henry Gregory	Nationalist	Dampier	WA	1913–1940
Littleton Groom	Nationalist	Darling Downs	Qld	1901–1929, 1931–1936
Edward Heitmann	Nationalist	Kalgoorlie	WA	1917–1919
William Higgs	Labor	Capricornia	Qld	1910–1922
William Hill	Victorian Farmers	Echuca	Vic	1919–1934
Charles Howroyd	Nationalist	Darwin	Tas	1917
Billy Hughes	Nationalist	Bendigo	Vic	1901–1952
Sir William Irvine	Nationalist	Flinders	Vic	1906–1918
Jens Jensen	Nationalist/Independent	Bass	Tas	1910–1919
Elliot Johnson	Nationalist	Lang	NSW	1903–1928
Edmund Jowett	Victorian Farmers	Grampians	Vic	1917–1922
Willie Kelly	Nationalist	Wentworth	NSW	1903–1919
William Laird Smith	Nationalist	Denison	Tas	1910–1922
Hector Lamond	Nationalist	Illawarra	NSW	1917–1922
John Leckie	Nationalist	Indi	Vic	1917–1919
John Lister	Nationalist	Corio	Vic	1917–1929
John Livingston	Nationalist	Barker	SA	1906–1922
John Lynch	Nationalist	Werriwa	NSW	1914–1919
George Mackay	Nationalist	Lilley	Qld	1917–1934
William Mahony	Labor	Dalley	NSW	1915–1927
William Maloney	Labor	Melbourne	Vic	1904–1940
Chester Manifold	Nationalist	Corangamite	Vic	1901–1903, 1913–1918
Walter Massy-Greene	Nationalist	Richmond	NSW	1910–1922
James Mathews	Labor	Melbourne Ports	Vic	1906–1931
George Maxwell	Nationalist	Fawkner	Vic	1917–1935
Charles McDonald	Labor	Kennedy	Qld	1901–1925
Charles McGrath	Labor	Ballarat	Vic	1913–1919, 1920–1934
William McWilliams	Nationalist	Franklin	Tas	1903–1922, 1928–1929
Samuel Nicholls	Labor	Macquarie	NSW	1917–1922
Richard Orchard	Nationalist	Nepean	NSW	1913–1919
Jim Page	Labor	Maranoa	Qld	1901–1921
Albert Palmer	Nationalist	Echuca	Vic	1906–1919
Henry Pigott	Nationalist	Calare	NSW	1913–1919
Alexander Poynton	Nationalist	Grey	SA	1901–1922
Edward Riley	Labor	South Sydney	NSW	1910–1931
Arthur Rodgers	Nationalist	Wannon	Vic	1913–1922, 1925–1929
Granville Ryrie	Nationalist	North Sydney	NSW	1911–1927
Carty Salmon	Nationalist	Grampians	Vic	1901–1913, 1915–1917
Sydney Sampson	Nationalist	Wimmera	Vic	1906–1919
Hugh Sinclair	Nationalist	Moreton	Qld	1906–1919
Bruce Smith	Nationalist/Independent	Parkes	NSW	1901–1919
William Spence	Nationalist	Darwin	Tas	1901–1917, 1917–1919
William Story	Nationalist	Boothby	SA	1904–1917 (S), 1917–1922
John Thomson	Nationalist	Cowper	NSW	1906–1919
Frank Tudor	Labor	Yarra	Vic	1901–1922
Con Wallace	Labor	West Sydney	NSW	1917–1919
David Watkins	Labor	Newcastle	NSW	1901–1935
William Watt	Nationalist	Balaclava	Vic	1914–1929
William Webster	Nationalist	Gwydir	NSW	1903–1919
John West	Labor	East Sydney	NSW	1910–1931
George Wise	Nationalist	Gippsland	Vic	1906–1913, 1914–1922
George Edwin Yates	Labor	Adelaide	SA	1914–1919, 1922–1931
