= Members of the Australian House of Representatives, 1910–1913 =

Members of the Australian House of Representatives, 1910-1913
- ←1906-1910 1913-1914→

This is a list of the members of the Australian House of Representatives in the Fourth Australian Parliament, which was elected on 13 April 1910.

Member	Party	Electorate	State	In office
Frank Anstey	Labor	Bourke	Vic	1910
William Archibald *	Labor	Hindmarsh	SA	1910
Llewellyn Atkinson	Liberal	Wilmot	Tas	1906
Frederick Bamford	Labor	Herbert	Qld	1901
Lee Batchelor	Labor	Boothby	SA	1901
Henry Beard	Labor	Batman	Vic	1910
Thomas Brown	Labor	Calare	NSW	1901–1906, 1906
George Cann	Labor	Nepean	NSW	1910
Ernest Carr	Labor	Macquarie	NSW	1906
James Catts	Labor	Cook	NSW	1906
John Chanter	Labor	Riverina	NSW	1901–1903, 1904 (by-election)
Austin Chapman *	Liberal	Eden-Monaro	NSW	1901
Matthew Charlton	Labor	Hunter	NSW	1910
Joseph Cook	Liberal	Parramatta	NSW	1901
Alfred Deakin	Liberal	Ballarat	Vic	1901
George Edwards	Liberal	North Sydney	NSW	1901–1906, 1910
Richard Edwards	Liberal	Oxley	Qld	1901
George Fairbairn	Liberal	Fawkner	Vic	1906
James Fenton	Labor	Maribyrnong	Vic	1910
William Finlayson	Labor	Brisbane	Qld	1910
Andrew Fisher	Labor	Wide Bay	Qld	1901
Sir John Forrest	Liberal	Swan	WA	1901
Frank Foster	Labor	New England	NSW	1906
Richard Foster	Liberal	Wakefield	SA	1909 (by-election)
James Fowler	Liberal	Perth	WA	1901
Charlie Frazer	Labor	Kalgoorlie	WA	1903
George Fuller	Liberal	Illawarra	NSW	1901
Paddy Glynn *	Liberal	Angas	SA	1901
Littleton Groom	Liberal	Darling Downs	Qld	1901
David Hall	Labor	Werriwa	NSW	1906
Robert Harper	Liberal	Mernda	Vic	1901
William Hedges	Liberal	Fremantle	WA	1906
William Higgs	Labor	Capricornia	Qld	1910
Robert Howe	Labor	Dalley	NSW	1910
Billy Hughes	Labor	West Sydney	NSW	1901
Hans Irvine	Liberal	Grampians	Vic	1906
William Irvine	Liberal	Flinders	Vic	1906
Jens Jensen	Labor	Bass	Tas	1910
Elliot Johnson	Liberal	Lang	NSW	1903
William Johnson	Labor	Robertson	NSW	1910
Willie Kelly	Liberal	Wentworth	NSW	1903
William Knox	Liberal	Kooyong	Vic	1901
William Laird Smith	Labor	Denison	Tas	1910
John Livingston	Liberal	Barker	SA	1906
Sir William Lyne	Independent	Hume	NSW	1901
Charles McDonald	Labor	Kennedy	Qld	1901
John McDougall	Labor	Wannon	Vic	1906
William McWilliams	Liberal	Franklin	Tas	1903
Hugh Mahon	Labor	Coolgardie	WA	1901
William Maloney	Labor	Melbourne	Vic	1906
Walter Massy-Greene	Liberal	Richmond	NSW	1910
James Mathews	Labor	Melbourne Ports	Vic	1906
Parker Moloney	Labor	Indi	Vic	1910
King O'Malley	Labor	Darwin	Tas	1901
Alfred Ozanne	Labor	Corio	Vic	1910
Jim Page	Labor	Maranoa	Qld	1901
Albert Palmer	Liberal	Echuca	Vic	1906
Alexander Poynton *	Labor	Grey	SA	1901
Sir John Quick	Liberal	Bendigo	Vic	1901
Edward Riley	Labor	South Sydney	NSW	1910
Ernest Roberts	Labor	Adelaide	SA	1908 (by-election)
Carty Salmon	Liberal	Laanecoorie	Vic	1901
Sydney Sampson	Liberal	Wimmera	Vic	1906
James Scullin	Labor	Corangamite	Vic	1910
Hugh Sinclair	Liberal	Moreton	Qld	1906
Bruce Smith	Liberal	Parkes	NSW	1901
William Spence	Labor	Darling	NSW	1901
Josiah Thomas	Labor	Barrier	NSW	1901
John Thomson	Liberal	Cowper	NSW	1906
Frank Tudor	Labor	Yarra	Vic	1901
David Watkins	Labor	Newcastle	NSW	1901
William Webster	Labor	Gwydir	NSW	1903
John West	Labor	East Sydney	NSW	1910
George Wise	Independent	Gippsland	Vic	1906
Agar Wynne	Liberal	Balaclava	Vic	1906

== Notes ==
* These candidates were elected unopposed.

1. The Commonwealth Liberal Party, or the Fusion Party, was formed in 1909 when the Protectionist Party merged with the Free Trade Party.
2. Lee Batchelor died in 1911, and was replaced by David Gordon (Commonwealth Liberal) at the resulting by-election on 11 November 1911.
3. Henry Beard died in 1911, and was replaced by Frank Brennan (Labor) at the resulting by-election on 8 February 1911.
4. Thomas Brown was first elected in 1901 to the Division of Canobolas, which was abolished at the 1906 redistribution.
5. John Chanter was first elected in 1901, defeated at the 1903 election, but then re-elected at a by-election in 1904.
6. George Edwards died in 1911, and was replaced by Granville Ryrie (Commonwealth Liberal) at the resulting by-election on 11 March 1911.
7. George Edwards was first elected in 1901 to the Division of South Sydney, but retired before the 1906 election.
8. James Fowler joined the Commonwealth Liberal Party in 1909 having previously been a Labor member.
9. David Hall resigned in 1912, and was replaced by Benjamin Bennett (Labor) at the resulting by-election on 1 June 1912.
10. William Higgs previously sat in the Australian Senate as a Senator for Queensland from 1901 to 1907.
11. William Knox resigned in 1910, and was replaced by Sir Robert Best (Commonwealth Liberal) at the resulting by-election on 29 August 1910.
12. Sir William Lyne stood as an independent, having previously been a member of the Protectionist Party.
13. George Wise stood as an independent, having previously been a member of the Protectionist Party.
