= Members of the Australian House of Representatives, 1913–1914 =

Members of the Australian House of Representatives, 1913-1914
- ←1910-1913 1914-1917→

This is a list of the members of the Australian House of Representatives in the Fifth Australian Parliament, which was elected on 31 May 1913.

| Member | Party | Electorate | State | In office |
|---|---|---|---|---|
| Percy Abbott | Liberal | New England | NSW | 1913 |
| Cornelius Ahern | Liberal | Indi | Vic | 1913 |
| Frank Anstey | Labor | Bourke | Vic | 1910 |
| William Archibald * | Labor | Hindmarsh | SA | 1910 |
| John Arthur | Labor | Bendigo | Vic | 1913 |
| Llewellyn Atkinson | Liberal | Wilmot | Tas | 1906 |
| Fred Bamford | Labor | Herbert | Qld | 1901 |
| James Bennett | Liberal | Gippsland | Vic | 1913 |
| Sir Robert Best | Liberal | Kooyong | Vic | 1910 (by-election) |
| James Boyd | Liberal | Henty † | Vic | 1913 |
| Frank Brennan | Labor | Batman | Vic | 1911 (by-election) |
| Reginald Burchell | Labor | Fremantle | WA | 1913 |
| George Burns | Labor | Illawarra | NSW | 1913 |
| Ernest Carr | Labor | Macquarie | NSW | 1906 |
| James Catts | Labor | Cook | NSW | 1906 |
| Austin Chapman | Liberal | Eden-Monaro | NSW | 1901 |
| Matthew Charlton | Labor | Hunter | NSW | 1910 |
| Alfred Conroy | Liberal | Werriwa | NSW | 1901–1906, 1913 |
| Joseph Cook | Liberal | Parramatta | NSW | 1901 |
| George Dankel | Labor | Boothby | SA | 1913 |
| Franc Falkiner | Liberal | Riverina | NSW | 1913 |
| James Fenton | Labor | Maribyrnong | Vic | 1910 |
| William Finlayson | Labor | Brisbane | Qld | 1910 |
| Andrew Fisher | Labor | Wide Bay | Qld | 1901 |
| William Fleming | Liberal | Robertson | NSW | 1913 |
| Sir John Forrest | Liberal | Swan | WA | 1901 |
| Richard Foster | Liberal | Wakefield | SA | 1909 (by-election) |
| James Fowler | Liberal | Perth | WA | 1901 |
| Charlie Frazer * | Labor | Kalgoorlie | WA | 1903 |
| Paddy Glynn * | Liberal | Angas | SA | 1901 |
| Henry Gregory | Liberal | Dampier † | WA | 1913 |
| Littleton Groom | Liberal | Darling Downs | Qld | 1901 (by-election) |
| Joseph Hannan | Labor | Fawkner | Vic | 1913 |
| William Higgs | Labor | Capricornia | Qld | 1910 |
| Robert Howe | Labor | Dalley | NSW | 1910 |
| Billy Hughes | Labor | West Sydney | NSW | 1901 |
| Hans Irvine | Liberal | Grampians | Vic | 1906 |
| William Irvine | Liberal | Flinders | Vic | 1906 |
| Jens Jensen | Labor | Bass | Tas | 1910 |
| Elliot Johnson | Liberal | Lang | NSW | 1903 |
| Willie Kelly | Liberal | Wentworth | NSW | 1903 |
| William Kendell | Liberal | Corio | Vic | 1913 |
| William Laird Smith | Labor | Denison | Tas | 1910 |
| John Livingston | Liberal | Barker | SA | 1906 |
| Charles McDonald | Labor | Kennedy | Qld | 1901 |
| Charles McGrath | Labor | Ballarat | Vic | 1913 |
| William McWilliams | Liberal | Franklin | Tas | 1903 |
| William Maloney | Labor | Melbourne | Vic | 1906 |
| Chester Manifold | Liberal | Corangamite | Vic | 1901–1903, 1913 |
| Walter Massy-Greene | Liberal | Richmond | NSW | 1910 |
| James Mathews | Labor | Melbourne Ports | Vic | 1906 |
| King O'Malley | Labor | Darwin | Tas | 1901 |
| Richard Orchard | Liberal | Nepean | NSW | 1913 |
| Jim Page | Labor | Maranoa | Qld | 1901 |
| Albert Palmer | Liberal | Echuca | Vic | 1906 |
| Robert Patten | Liberal | Hume | NSW | 1913 |
| Henry Pigott | Liberal | Calare | NSW | 1913 |
| Alexander Poynton | Labor | Grey | SA | 1901 |
| Edward Riley | Labor | South Sydney | NSW | 1910 |
| Ernest Roberts | Labor | Adelaide | SA | 1908 (by-election) |
| Arthur Rodgers | Liberal | Wannon | Vic | 1913 |
| Granville Ryrie | Liberal | North Sydney | NSW | 1911 (by-election) |
| Sydney Sampson | Liberal | Wimmera | Vic | 1906 |
| James Sharpe | Labor | Oxley | Qld | 1913 |
| Hugh Sinclair | Liberal | Moreton | Qld | 1906 |
| Bruce Smith | Liberal | Parkes | NSW | 1901 |
| William Spence | Labor | Darling | NSW | 1901 |
| Jacob Stumm | Liberal | Lilley † | Qld | 1913 |
| Josiah Thomas | Labor | Barrier | NSW | 1901 |
| John Thomson | Liberal | Cowper | NSW | 1906 |
| Frank Tudor | Labor | Yarra | Vic | 1901 |
| David Watkins | Labor | Newcastle | NSW | 1901 |
| William Webster | Labor | Gwydir | NSW | 1903 |
| John West | Labor | East Sydney | NSW | 1910 |
| Agar Wynne | Liberal | Balaclava | Vic | 1906 |

== Notes ==
* These candidates were elected unopposed.
† These seats were created at the 1912 redistribution.

1. Alfred Conroy was first elected as the member for Werriwa in 1901, but was defeated in 1906.
2. Charlie Frazer died in 1913, and was replaced by Hugh Mahon (Labor) at the resulting by-election on 22 December 1913.
3. Chester Manifold was first elected as the member for Corangamite in 1901, but he retired in 1903.
4. Ernest Roberts died in 1913, and was replaced by George Edwin Yates (Labor) at the resulting by-election on 10 January 1914.
