= 1913 Australian Senate election =

- 31 May 1913

18 of the 36 seats in the Senate 18 seats needed for a majority
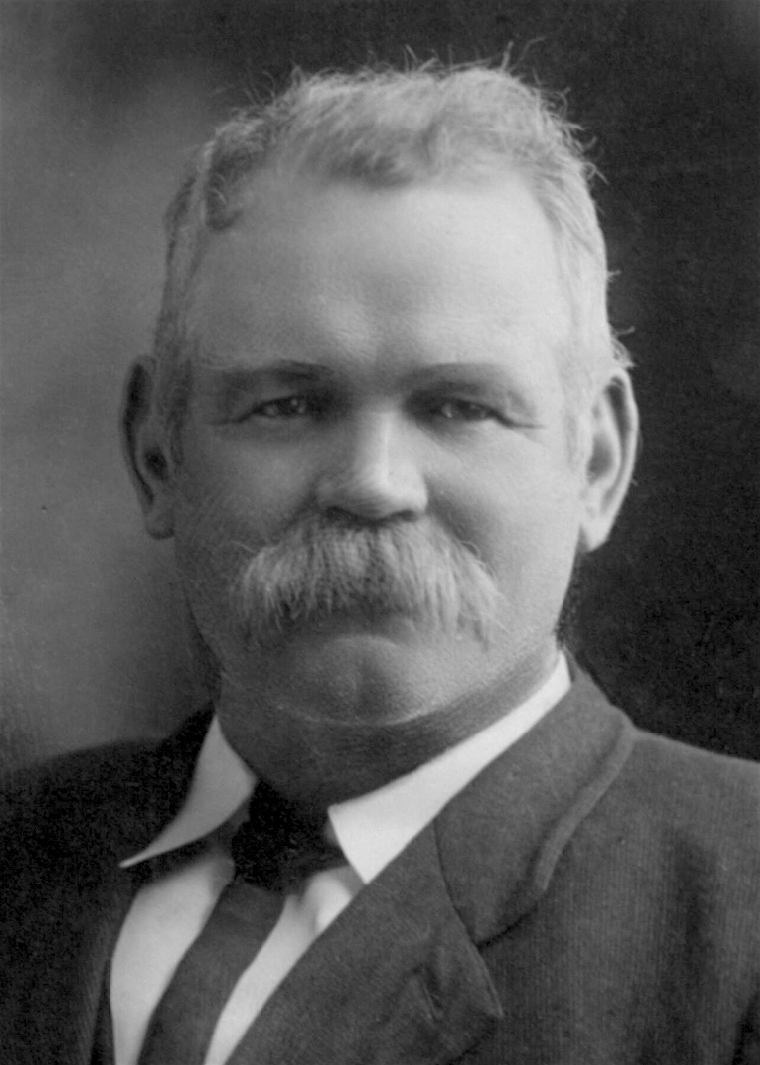

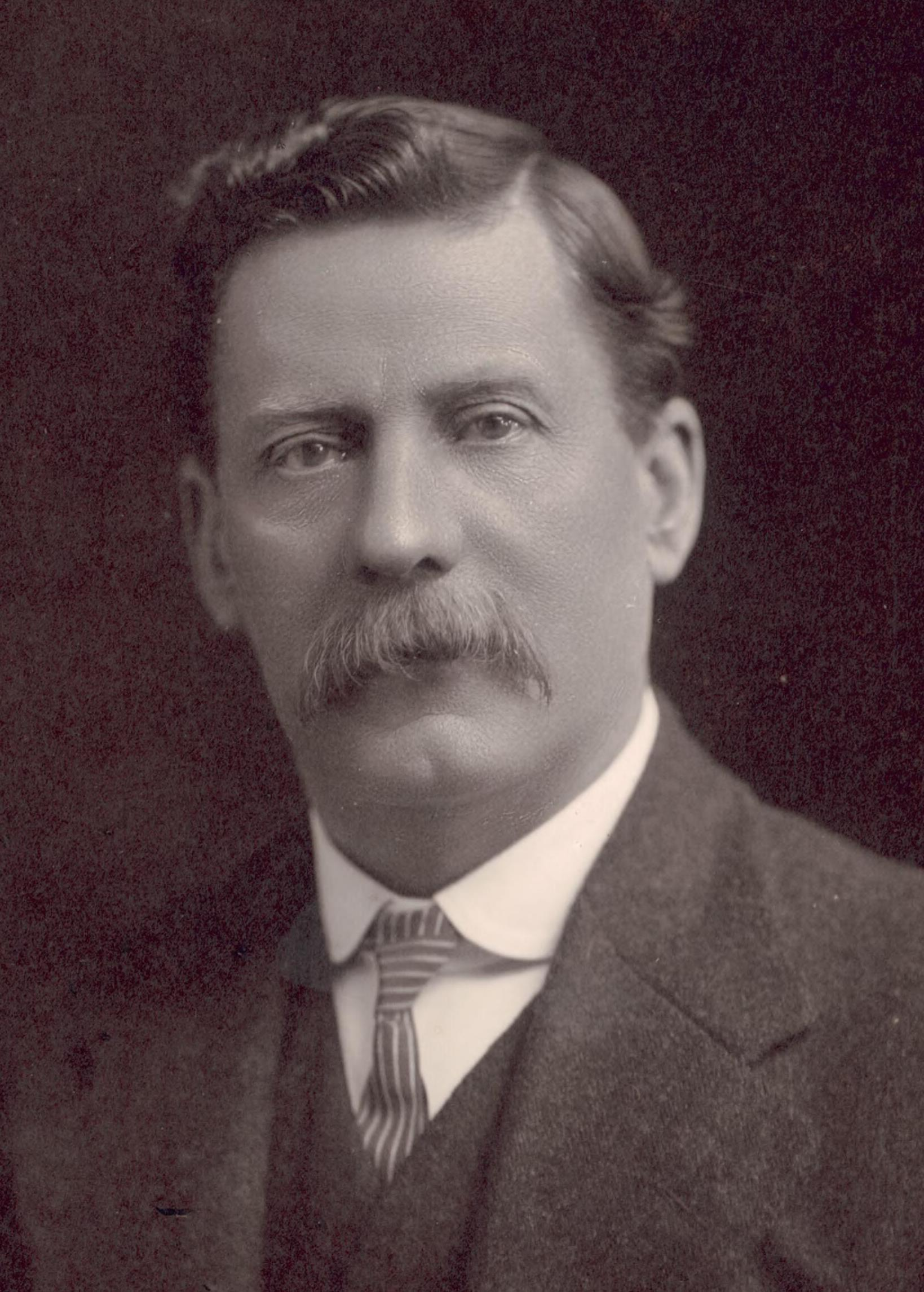
	First party	Second party
Leader	Gregor McGregor	Edward Millen
Party	Labor	Liberal
Leader's seat	South Australia	New South Wales
Seats before	22	14
Seats won	11	7
Seats after	29	7
Seat change	▲7	▼7
Popular vote	934,176	946,807
Percentage	48.72%	49.38%
Swing	▼1.58pp	▲3.82pp

The Australian states each elected three members of the Australian Senate at the 1913 federal election to serve a six-year term starting on 1 July 1913.

== Australia ==
Senate 1913 (FPTP BV) — Turnout 73.63% (Non-CV) — Informal 5.66
Party	Votes	%	Swing	Seats won	Seats held	Change
Liberal	946,807	49.38	+3.83	7	7	▼7
Labour	934,176	48.72	−1.58	11	29	▲7
Socialist Labor	20,183	1.05	+1.05			
Independents	16,233	0.85	−2.51			
Total	1,917,399			18	36	
Invalid/blank votes	114,947	5.66	−1.00			
Turnout	2,032,346	73.63	+11.55			
Registered voters	2,760,216					
Source: Psephos: 1913 Senate

== New South Wales ==
Each elector voted for up to three candidates. Percentages refer to the number of voters rather than the number of votes.

1913 Australian federal election: Senate, New South Wales
Party	Candidate	Votes	%	±%
Liberal	Sir Albert Gould (re-elected 1)	358,143	53.6	−2.3 (Note: Change compared to the personal vote at the 1906 election.)
Liberal	Edward Millen (re-elected 2)	350,887	52.5	−1.7
Liberal	Charles Oakes (elected 3)	349,544	52.3	
Labour	John Grant	301,994	45.2	
Labour	David Watson	300,826	45.0	
Labour	Ike Smith	284,322	42.5	
Socialist Labor	James Moroney	22,969	3.4	−1.1 (Note: Change compared to the personal vote at the 1910 election.)
Socialist Labor	Thomas Batho	21,817	3.3	
Socialist Labor	Henry Ostler	15,763	2.4	
Total formal votes		2,006,265; 668,755 voters	93.2	−2.0
Informal votes		48,195	6.7	+2.0
Turnout		716,950	69.2	+7.8
Party total votes
Liberal		1,058,574	52.8	+8.4
Labour		887,142	44.2	−6.3
Socialist Labor		60,549	3.0	+1.4

== Queensland ==
Each elector voted for up to three candidates. Percentages refer to the number of voters rather than the number of votes.

1913 Australian federal election: Senate, Queensland
Party	Candidate	Votes	%	±%
Labour	William Maughan (elected 1)	145,477	54.7	
Labour	John Mullan (elected 2)	143,700	54.0	
Labour	Myles Ferricks (elected 3)	143,416	53.9	
Liberal	Thomas Chataway (defeated)	123,621	46.5	−5.3
Liberal	Robert Sayers (defeated)	121,780	45.8	−4.4
Liberal	Anthony St Ledger (defeated)	121,372	45.2	−4.0
Total formal votes		798,366; 266,122 voters	94.9	+0.1
Informal votes		14,403	−0.1	
Turnout		280,525	77.3	+16.1
Party total votes
Labour		432,593	54.2	+3.9
Liberal		365,773	45.8	−1.8

== South Australia ==
Each elector voted for up to three candidates. Percentages refer to the number of voters rather than the number of votes.

1913 Australian federal election: Senate, South Australia
Party	Candidate	Votes	%	±%
Labour	James O'Loghlin (elected 1)	96,750	52.5	
Labour	John Newlands (elected 2)	96,179	52.2	
Labour	William Senior (elected 3)	94,222	51.1	
Liberal	Joseph Vardon (defeated)	82,829	45.0	−1.5
Liberal	John Shannon (defeated)	82,436	44.7	(Note: John Shannon (Liberal) had been appointed to replace William Russell (Labour) who died on 28 June 1912.)
Liberal	Peter Allen	81,805	44.4	
Independent	Sir Josiah Symon (defeated)	18,556	10.1	−1.7
Total formal votes		552,777; 184,259 voters	94.3	−2.4
Informal votes		11,204	5.7	+2.4
Turnout		195,463	80.1	+26.9
Party total votes
Labour		287,151	51.9	−1.7
Liberal		247,070	44.7	−1.7
Independent		18,556	10.1	

== Tasmania ==
Each elector voted for up to three candidates. Percentages refer to the number of voters rather than the number of votes.

1913 Australian federal election: Senate, Tasmania
Party	Candidate	Votes	%	±%
Liberal	John Keating (re-elected 1)	39,409	52.3	+1.2
Liberal	Thomas Bakhap (elected 2)	39,331	52.2	
Liberal	John Clemons (re-elected 2)	38,249	50.7	−0.4
Labour	James Guy	35,062	44.4	+2.1
Labour	James Ogden	34,951	46.4	
Labour	James Hurst	34,583	45.9	
Independent	Cyril Cameron (defeated) (Note: Cyril Cameron lost Liberal pre-selection and contested the election as an Independent.)	4,615	6.1	−47.6
Total formal votes		226,200; 75,400 voters	93.8	
Informal votes		4,998	6.2	
Turnout		80,398	75.3	
Party total votes
Liberal		116,989	51.7	+8.0
Labour		104,596	46.2	−8.9
Independent		4,615	2.0	

== Victoria ==
Each elector voted for up to three candidates. Percentages refer to the number of voters rather than the number of votes.

1913 Australian federal election: Senate, Victoria
Party	Candidate	Votes	%	±%
Labour	Edward Russell (re-elected 1)	299,969	50.1	+13.3
Liberal	James McColl (re-elected 2)	297,390	49.7	−2.3
Labour	John Barnes (elected 3)	294,919	49.2	
Liberal	Carty Salmon	293,370	49.0	
Labour	Andrew McKissock	293,307	49.0	
Liberal	Samuel Mauger	292,412	48.8	
Independent	William Renwick	25,528	4.3	
Total formal votes		1,796,895; 598,965 voters	95.5	+1.0
Informal votes		27,896	4.5	−0.1
Turnout		626,861	75.5	+8.9
Party total votes
Labour		888,195	49.4	+1.0
Liberal		883,172	49.1	+2.8
Independent		25,528	1.4	

== Western Australia ==
Each elector voted for up to three candidates. Percentages refer to the number of voters rather than the number of votes.

1913 Australian federal election: Senate, Western Australia
Party	Candidate	Votes	%	±%
Labour	George Pearce (re-elected 1)	68,916	55.6	−3.1
Labour	Patrick Lynch (re-elected 2)	67,039	54.1	+7.1
Labour	Ted Needham (re-elected 3)	66,897	54.0	−0.8
Liberal	William Butcher	56,730	45.8	
Liberal	William Nairn	56,162	45.3	
Liberal	Charles Davies	55,950	45.2	
Total formal votes		371,694; 123,898 voters	93.8	−0.8
Informal votes		8,251	6.2	+0.8
Turnout		132,149	73.5	+11.3
Party total votes
Labour		202,852	54.6	+0.7
Liberal		168,842	45.4	−0.7

== See also ==
- Candidates of the 1913 Australian federal election
- Results of the 1913 Australian federal election (House of Representatives)
- Members of the Australian Senate, 1913–1914
