= 1913 Australian federal election =

Election for the 5th Parliament of Australia

- 31 May 1913

All 75 seats in the House of Representatives 38 seats were needed for a majority in the House 18 (of the 36) seats in the Senate
- Registered: 2,760,216 ▲22.22%
- Turnout: 1,955,723 (73.49%) (Note: Turnout in contested seats) (▲10.69 pp)
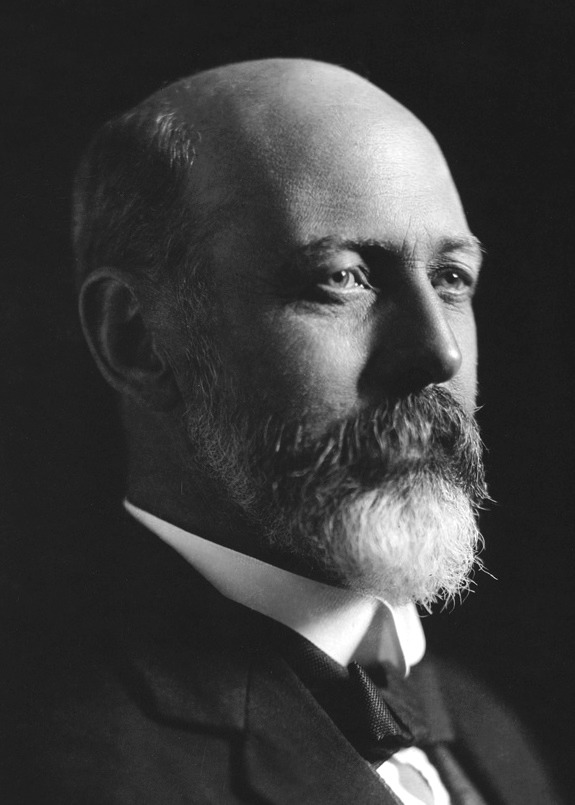

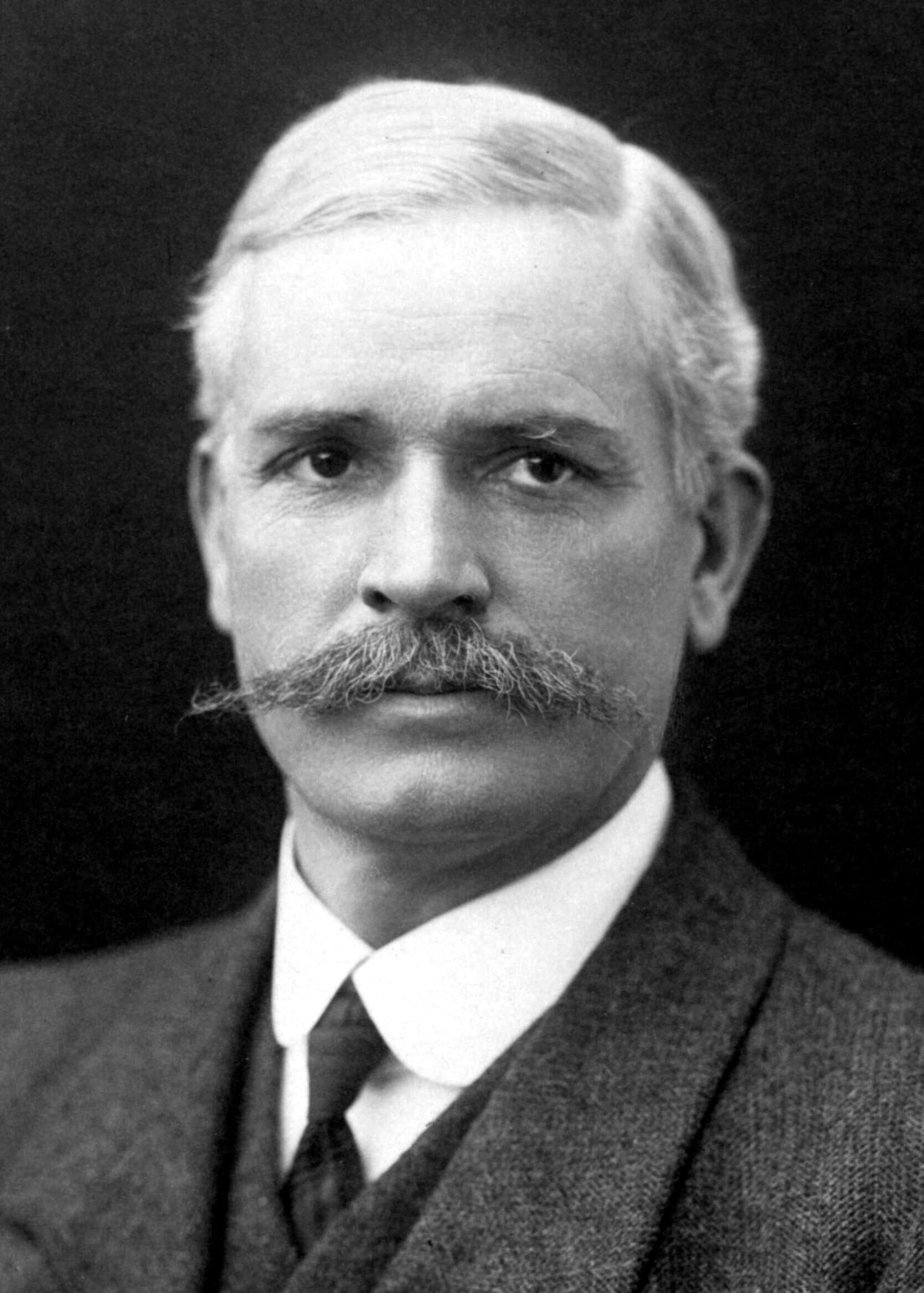
	First party	Second party
Leader	Joseph Cook	Andrew Fisher
Party	Liberal	Labor
Leader since	20 January 1913	30 October 1907
Leader's seat	Parramatta (NSW)	Wide Bay (Qld)
Last election	31 seats	42 seats
Seats won	38 seats	37 seats
Seat change	▲7	▼5
Popular vote	930,076	921,099
Percentage	48.94%	48.47%
Swing	▲3.85%	▼1.50%
- Results by division for the House of Representatives, shaded by winning party's margin of victory.
Prime Minister before election
Andrew Fisher
Labor
Subsequent Prime Minister
Joseph Cook
Liberal

The 1913 Australian federal election was held in Australia on 31 May 1913. All 75 seats in the House of Representatives, and 18 of the 36 seats in the Senate were up for election. The incumbent Labor Party, led by Prime Minister Andrew Fisher, was defeated by the opposition Commonwealth Liberal Party under Joseph Cook, marking the second time an Australian Prime Minister was defeated at an election. The new government had a majority of just a single seat, and held a minority of seats in the Senate. It would last only 15 months, suffering defeat at the 1914 election.

The 1913 election was held in conjunction with six referendum questions, none of which were carried. According to David Day, Andrew Fisher's biographer, "it was probably the timing of the referenda that was most responsible for the disappointing election result" for the Labor Party.

== Results ==
=== House of Representatives ===
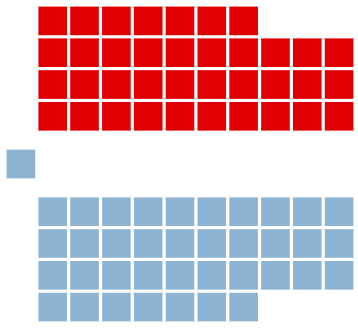
Labour: 37 seats Liberal: 38 seats

House of Reps 1913–14 (FPTP) — Turnout 73.49% (Non-CV) — Informal 2.83%
Party	Votes	%	Swing	Seats	Change
Liberal	930,076	48.94	+3.85	38	+7
Labor	921,099	48.47	−1.50	37	−5
Independents	49,194	2.59	−2.35	0	−2
Total	1,900,369			75	
Liberal	Win			38	+7
Labor				37	−5

Notes

- Three members were elected unopposed – one Liberal and two Labor.

Popular vote
Liberal	48.94%
Labor	48.47%
Independent	2.59%

Parliament seats
Liberal	50.67%
Labor	49.33%

=== Senate ===
Senate 1913–14 (FPTP BV) — Turnout 73.66% (Non-CV) — Informal N/A
Party	Votes	%	Swing	Seats won	Seats held	Change
Liberal	946,807	49.38	+3.83	7	7	−7
Labor	934,176	48.72	−1.58	11	29	+7
Socialist Labor	20,183	1.05	+1.05	0	0	0
Independents	16,233	0.85	−2.51	0	0	0
Total	1,917,399			18	36	

== Seats changing hands ==
Seat	Pre-1913			Swing	Post-1913		
Seat	Party	Member	Margin	Swing	Margin	Member	Party
Ballaarat, Vic	Liberal	Alfred Deakin	1.1	3.1	0.6	Charles McGrath	Labor
Bendigo, Vic	Liberal	John Quick	1.3	3.6	2.0	John Arthur	Labor
Boothby, SA	Liberal	David Gordon	7.1	10.8	3.0	George Dankel	Labor
Calare, NSW	Labor	Thomas Brown	3.6	5.9	2.1	Henry Pigott	Liberal
Corangamite, Vic	Labor	James Scullin	4.7	6.1	2.2	Chester Manifold	Liberal
Corio, Vic	Labor	Alfred Ozanne	4.4	5.1	1.8	William Kendell	Liberal
Fremantle, WA	Liberal	William Hedges	4.5	11.4	5.8	Reginald Burchell	Labor
Gippsland, Vic	Independent	George Wise	12.1	12.7	5.0	James Bennett	Liberal
Hume, NSW	Independent	William Lyne	16.4	16.2	0.7	Robert Patten	Liberal
Indi, Vic	Labor	Parker Moloney	3.1	3.2	2.2	Cornelius Ahern	Liberal
New England, NSW	Labor	Frank Foster	2.7	9.5	6.5	Percy Abbott	Liberal
Oxley, Qld	Liberal	Richard Edwards	12.2	N/A	4.4	James Sharpe	Labor
Riverina, NSW	Labor	John Chanter	7.0	8.6	1.0	Franc Falkiner	Liberal
Wannon, Vic	Labor	John McDougall	5.0	7.8	4.2	Arthur Rodgers	Liberal
Werriwa, NSW	Labor	Benjamin Bennett	0.8	6.5	5.9	Alfred Conroy	Liberal

- Members listed in italics did not contest their seat at this election.

== Post-election pendulum ==
Government seats
Commonwealth Liberal Party
Marginal
Hume (NSW)	Robert Patten	LIB	0.7 vs IND
Riverina (NSW)	Franc Falkiner	LIB	1.0
Corio (Vic)	William Kendell	LIB	1.8
Calare (NSW)	Henry Pigott	LIB	2.1
Indi (Vic)	Cornelius Ahern	LIB	2.2
Corangamite (Vic)	Chester Manifold	LIB	2.2
Dampier (WA)	Henry Gregory	LIB	2.6
Perth (WA)	James Fowler	LIB	3.3
Wakefield (SA)	Richard Foster	LIB	3.7
Grampians (Vic)	Hans Irvine	LIB	3.9
Wannon (Vic)	Arthur Rodgers	LIB	4.2
Lilley (Qld)	Jacob Stumm	LIB	4.7
Swan (WA)	John Forrest	LIB	4.9
Gippsland (Vic)	James Bennett	LIB	5.0 vs IND
Robertson (NSW)	William Fleming	LIB	5.3
Nepean (NSW)	Richard Orchard	LIB	5.6
Franklin (Tas)	William McWilliams	LIB	5.8
Werriwa (NSW)	Alfred Conroy	LIB	5.9
Fairly safe
New England (NSW)	Percy Abbott	LIB	6.5
Lang (NSW)	Elliot Johnson	LIB	7.1
Flinders (Vic)	William Irvine	LIB	7.8
Eden-Monaro (NSW)	Austin Chapman	LIB	8.7
Barker (SA)	John Livingston	LIB	9.0
Safe
Darling Downs (Qld)	Littleton Groom	LIB	10.0
Moreton (Qld)	Hugh Sinclair	LIB	10.7
Echuca (Vic)	Albert Palmer	LIB	11.0
Wentworth (NSW)	Willie Kelly	LIB	11.7
Kooyong (Vic)	Robert Best	LIB	11.9 vs IND
Parkes (NSW)	Bruce Smith	LIB	11.9
Wilmot (Tas)	Llewellyn Atkinson	LIB	12.6
Balaclava (Vic)	Agar Wynne	LIB	15.0
Henty (Vic)	James Boyd	LIB	17.1
Parramatta (NSW)	Joseph Cook	LIB	18.3
North Sydney (NSW)	Granville Ryrie	LIB	19.1
Richmond (NSW)	Walter Massy-Greene	LIB	19.9
Very safe
Wimmera (Vic)	Sydney Sampson	LIB	21.0
Cowper (NSW)	John Thomson	LIB	22.2
Angas (SA)	Paddy Glynn	LIB	unopposed

Non-government seats
Australian Labor Party
Marginal
Illawarra (NSW)	George Burns	ALP	0.2
Ballaarat (Vic)	Charles McGrath	ALP	0.6
Macquarie (NSW)	Ernest Carr	ALP	1.6
Grey (SA)	Alexander Poynton	ALP	2.0
Bendigo (Vic)	John Arthur	ALP	2.0
Darwin (Tas)	King O'Malley	ALP	2.1
Gwydir (NSW)	William Webster	ALP	2.2
Bass (Tas)	Jens Jensen	ALP	2.4
Boothby (SA)	George Dankel	ALP	3.0
Denison (Tas)	William Laird Smith	ALP	3.3
Fawkner (Vic)	Joseph Hannan	ALP	3.3
Oxley (Qld)	James Sharpe	ALP	4.4
Hunter (NSW)	Matthew Charlton	ALP	4.5
Wide Bay (Qld)	Andrew Fisher	ALP	5.6
Fremantle (WA)	Reginald Burchell	ALP	5.8
Fairly safe
East Sydney (NSW)	John West	ALP	6.1
Brisbane (Qld)	William Finlayson	ALP	6.9
Dalley (NSW)	Robert Howe	ALP	7.7
Herbert (Qld)	Fred Bamford	ALP	8.0
Cook (NSW)	James Catts	ALP	9.9
Safe
Bourke (Vic)	Frank Anstey	ALP	10.0
Darling (NSW)	William Spence	ALP	10.5
Maribyrnong (Vic))	James Fenton	ALP	10.8
Capricornia (Qld)	William Higgs	ALP	14.1
Batman (Vic)	Frank Brennan	ALP	14.9
Maranoa (Qld)	Jim Page	ALP	15.0
South Sydney (NSW)	Edward Riley	ALP	15.0
Adelaide (SA)	Ernest Roberts	ALP	18.4
Very safe
West Sydney (NSW)	Billy Hughes	ALP	21.3
Melbourne (Vic)	William Maloney	ALP	21.9 vs IND
Newcastle (NSW)	David Watkins	ALP	23.8
Kennedy (Qld)	Charles McDonald	ALP	24.4
Yarra (Vic)	Frank Tudor	ALP	25.0
Barrier (NSW)	Josiah Thomas	ALP	26.8
Melbourne Ports (Vic)	James Mathews	ALP	29.2
Hindmarsh (SA)	William Archibald	ALP	unopposed
Kalgoorlie (WA)	Charlie Frazer	ALP	unopposed

== See also ==
- Candidates of the 1913 Australian federal election
- Members of the Australian House of Representatives, 1913–1914
- Members of the Australian Senate, 1913–1914
