= Electoral results for the Division of Laanecoorie =

Australian division election results

This is a list of electoral results for the Division of Laanecoorie in Australian federal elections from the division's creation in 1901 until its abolition in 1913.

== Members ==
Member	Party	Term
Carty Salmon	Protectionist	1901–1909
Carty Salmon	Liberal	1909–1913

== Election results ==
=== Elections in the 1910s ===
==== 1910 ====
1910 Australian federal election: Laanecoorie
Party	Candidate	Votes	%	±%
Liberal	Carty Salmon	8,959	50.8	−17.0
Labour	Arthur Fraser	8,664	49.2	+17.0
Total formal votes		17,623	98.3	
Informal votes		296	1.7	
Turnout		17,919	68.5	
Liberal hold		Swing	−1.9	

=== Elections in the 1900s ===
==== 1906 ====
1906 Australian federal election: Laanecoorie
Party	Candidate	Votes	%	±%
Protectionist	Carty Salmon	5,204	37.5	−37.1
Labour	William Rowe	4,466	32.2	+32.2
Anti-Socialist	Walter Grose	4,206	30.3	+4.9
Total formal votes		13,876	94.0	
Informal votes		881	6.0	
Turnout		14,757	53.5	
Protectionist hold		Swing	−21.9	

==== 1903 ====
1903 Australian federal election: Laanecoorie
Party	Candidate	Votes	%	±%
Protectionist	Carty Salmon	6,930	74.6	+22.5
Free Trade	David Bevan	2,358	25.4	+25.4
Total formal votes		9,288	96.8	
Informal votes		311	3.2	
Turnout		9,599	48.1	
Protectionist hold		Swing	+22.5	

==== 1901 ====
1901 Australian federal election: Laanecoorie
Party	Candidate	Votes	%	±%
Protectionist	Carty Salmon	3,054	52.1	+52.1
Ind. Protectionist	Walter Grose	2,819	47.9	+47.9
Total formal votes		5,864	99.5	
Informal votes		30	0.5	
Turnout		5,894	58.1	
Protectionist win		(new seat)		
