= Boorara =

Boorara could refer to:

- Boorara, Western Australia, a small town in Western Australia.
- Boorara Station, a pastoral lease in Queensland, Australia.
- HMT Boorara, the name under which SS Pfalz sailed from 1914 to 1926
