= 1917 Grampians by-election =

27 October 1917
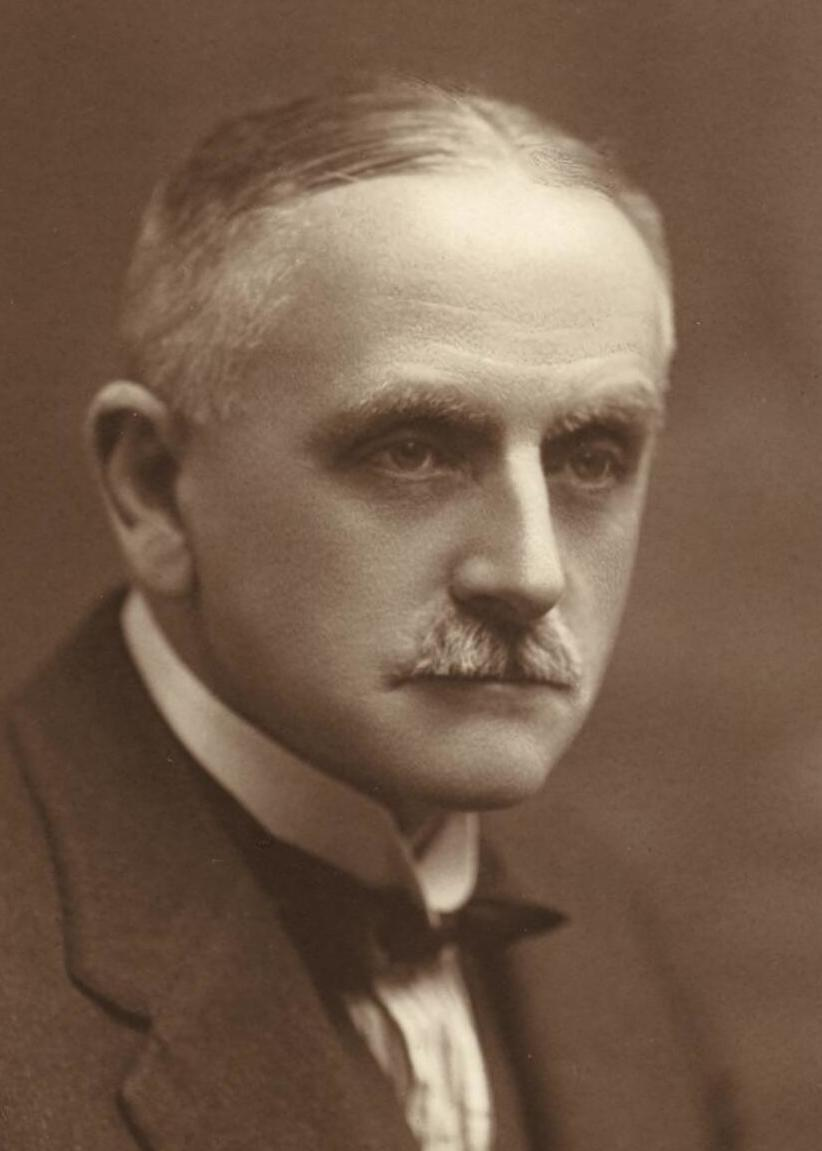
	First party	Second party
		ALP
Candidate	Edmund Jowett	David Russell
Party	Nationalist	Labor
Popular vote	11,232	9,265
Percentage	54.80%	45.20%
Swing	▼2.19pp	▲2.19pp
MP before election
Carty Salmon
Nationalist
Elected MP
Edmund Jowett
Nationalist

A by-election was held for the Australian House of Representatives seat of Grampians on 27 October 1917. This was triggered by the death of Nationalist MP and former Speaker Carty Salmon.

The by-election was won by Nationalist candidate Edmund Jowett, who was also endorsed by the Victorian Farmers' Union and who would defect to them before the 1919 election.

== Results ==
1917 Grampians by-election
Party	Candidate	Votes	%	±%
Nationalist	Edmund Jowett	11,232	54.80	−2.19
Labor	David Russell	9,265	45.20	+2.19
Total formal votes		20,497	99.47	+1.36
Informal votes		109	0.53	−1.36
Registered electors		31,346		
Turnout		20,606	65.74	−18.65
Nationalist hold		Swing	−2.19	
