= 1915 Grampians by-election =

A by-election was held for the Australian House of Representatives seat of Grampians on 20 February 1915. This was triggered by the death of Labor MP Edward Jolley.

The by-election was won by Liberal candidate Carty Salmon, who had previously served as member for Laanecoorie from 1901 to 1913 and as Speaker from 1909 to 1910.

== Results ==
1915 Grampians by-election
Party	Candidate	Votes	%	±%
Liberal	Carty Salmon	12,116	51.30	+1.56
Labor	John McDougall	11,522	48.74	−1.56
Total formal votes		23,638	99.49	+1.16
Informal votes		120	0.51	−1.16
Registered electors		34,977		
Turnout		23,758	67.92	−17.58
Liberal gain from Labor		Swing	+1.56	
