= Boorara Station =

Pastoral lease in south west Queensland, Australia

Coordinates: 28.66°S 144.38°E

Location in Queensland

Boorara Station, most commonly known as Boorara, is a pastoral lease that operates as a sheep and cattle station in south west Queensland.

== Geography ==
The property is located 38 kilometres (24 mi) north of Hungerford and 143 kilometres (89 mi) south west of Cunnamulla in the Channel Country of Queensland.

The station currently occupies an area of 1,153 square kilometres (445 sq mi) and in 2013 was carrying 1,500 head of cattle and 25,000 sheep. It is split into 23 paddocks and situated in the Paroo River catchment.

== History ==
The original lease was taken up by Alexander Hood, James Hood and James Torrance in the early 1800s and was run along with another property named Currawinya. By 1874 both of the properties had been sold to Hector and Norman Wilson who, in turn, sold it again in 1881 to Hew, Blackwood, Patterson and Company.

In 1894 approximately 140,000 sheep were being shorn at Boorara.

An attempt was made to sell the property in 1908 when the 1,458 square miles (3,776 km^{2}) was put up for auction along with the 80,000 sheep, 590 cattle and 259 horses the property was stocked with. No bids were received and the property was passed in for private treaty.

The cattle baron, Sidney Kidman acquired the property in 1913 and sold it in 1924 to Edmund Jowett for about £20,000.

In 1927 a well borer struck a flow of 500,000 imperial gallons (2,273 kl) daily, Jowett decided to sink three more bores in an attempt to find more permanent water supply on the property. Jowett changed Boorara from a cattle run to a sheep run and then later sold it on in 1930 to William George McGrath when the property had a size of 1,200 square miles (3,108 km^{2}) who held it until his death on 4 August 1949 when it was passed onto his sons J. D. and A. McGrath.

In 2008, the property was 452 square miles (1,171 km^{2}) and still uses the HT3 brand used by Hood and Torrance in 1866. The last of the owners of this proud station sold the property to the Queensland Government and Boorara is now part of the Currawinya National Park.

In September 2012 all the farm equipment was offered for sale.

== See also ==
- List of ranches and stations
