= Electoral district of Talbot and Avoca =

Former legislative electoral district of Victoria, Australia

Talbot and Avoca Victoria—Legislative Assembly
- State: Victoria
- Created: 1889
- Abolished: 1904
- Demographic: Rural

Talbot and Avoca was an electoral district of the Legislative Assembly in the Australian state of Victoria from 1889 to 1904. It was based in western Victoria around the towns of Talbot and Avoca. The Electoral district of Avoca was abolished in March 1889 and Talbot and Avoca created in April 1889.

== Members ==
Member	Term
James Syme Stewart	April 1889 – November 1889
Robert Bowman	May 1890^{#} – December 1893
Carty Salmon	May 1894^{#} – May 1901
George Mitchell	June 1901^{#} – May 1904

^{#} =by-election
