= Thomas Skene =

Australian politician

The Honourable Thomas Skene
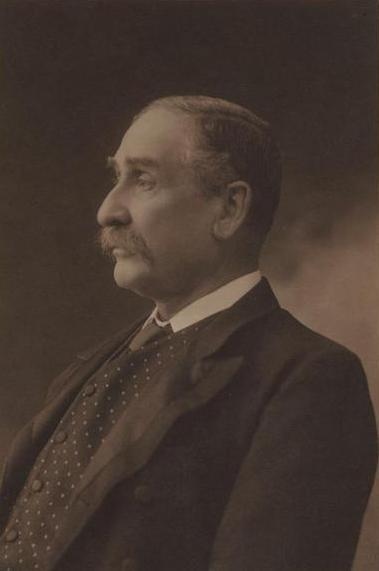

Member of the Australian Parliament for Grampians
- In office 29 March 1901 – 8 November 1906
- Preceded by: New seat
- Succeeded by: Hans Irvine

Personal details
- Born: 15 December 1845 Ballarat, Victoria
- Died: 15 March 1910 (aged 64) Sandringham, Victoria
- Party: Free Trade Party
- Spouse: Margaret Scott Anderson
- Occupation: Businessman

Thomas Skene (15 December 1845 – 15 March 1910) was an Australian politician.

== Early life ==
Skene was born near Ballarat, Victoria on 15 December 1845 to Scottish-born pastoralist William Skene and Jane, née Robertson. William was a member of the Victorian Legislative Council 1870–76. Thomas attended Cavendish and Scotch College in Melbourne, and subsequently entered the University of Aberdeen, after which he embarked on a long tour of Europe and the United States.

Skene married Margaret Scott Anderson on 2 September 1871, and ran Bassett, his father's property near Branxholme, from 1868, where he bred merino sheep. He sold the property in 1882 to finance a venture in New Mexico; he was unable to come to terms with the Mexican Government, however, necessitating his return to Victoria.

Maintaining a Melbourne home from 1892, Skene served on both the Portland and Stawell shire councils, was a founder of the Chamber of Agriculture, and was president of the Royal Agricultural Society of Victoria 1897–99 and 1906–08, having been a councillor since 1892. He also held the positions of chairman and president of the Colonial Bank of Australasia and director of the Trustees Executors & Agency Co. Ltd.

== Politics ==
Skene unsuccessfully ran for the Victorian Legislative Assembly in 1892 for the seat of Dundas. After strongly supporting Federation, he was elected to the first Parliament as a Free Trade Party member of the Australian House of Representatives, representing the seat of Grampians. He was a moderate free trader, however, and functioned as a link between that party and the Protectionists. He attempted to transfer to the Senate in 1906 but was defeated.

Skene died at Sandringham on 15 March 1910, and was survived by his wife, two sons and three daughters (his eldest son was killed in the South African War). At the time of his death, he had been selected to run for the Senate again, this time for the Commonwealth Liberal Party.

Parliament of Australia
| Preceded by new seat | Member for Grampians; 1901–1906 | Succeeded by Hans Irvine |
