= Division of Laanecoorie =

Former Australian federal electoral division

Laanecoorie Australian House of Representatives Division
- Created: 1901
- Abolished: 1913
- Namesake: Laanecoorie

The Division of Laanecoorie was an Australian electoral division in the state of Victoria. It was located in the centre of the state, covering the towns of Creswick, Maldon and Maryborough, and later Castlemaine and Daylesford. It was named after the town of Laanecoorie.

The division was proclaimed in 1900, and was one of the original 65 divisions to be contested at the first federal election. It gained Castlemaine in 1906 from the abolished Division of Corinella. The division of Laanecoorie was abolished at the redistribution of 1 February 1913, replaced by parts of Division of Bendigo (Maldon and Castlemaine) and Division of Grampians (remainder of Laanecoorie).

Throughout its 13 years of existence, it was held by one member, Carty Salmon, who was the second Speaker of the Australian House of Representatives from 1909 to 1910.

== Members ==
Image	Member	Party	Term	Notes
	Carty Salmon (1860–1917)	Protectionist	29 March 1901 – 26 May 1909	Previously held the Victorian Legislative Assembly seat of Talbot and Avoca. Served as Speaker during the Deakin Government. Failed to win a Senate seat after Laanecoorie was abolished in 1913. Later elected to the Division of Grampians in 1915
	Carty Salmon (1860–1917)	Liberal	26 May 1909 – 23 April 1913	Previously held the Victorian Legislative Assembly seat of Talbot and Avoca. Served as Speaker during the Deakin Government. Failed to win a Senate seat after Laanecoorie was abolished in 1913. Later elected to the Division of Grampians in 1915
