= Cyril Cameron =

Australian politician

Colonel The Honourable Cyril Cameron CB
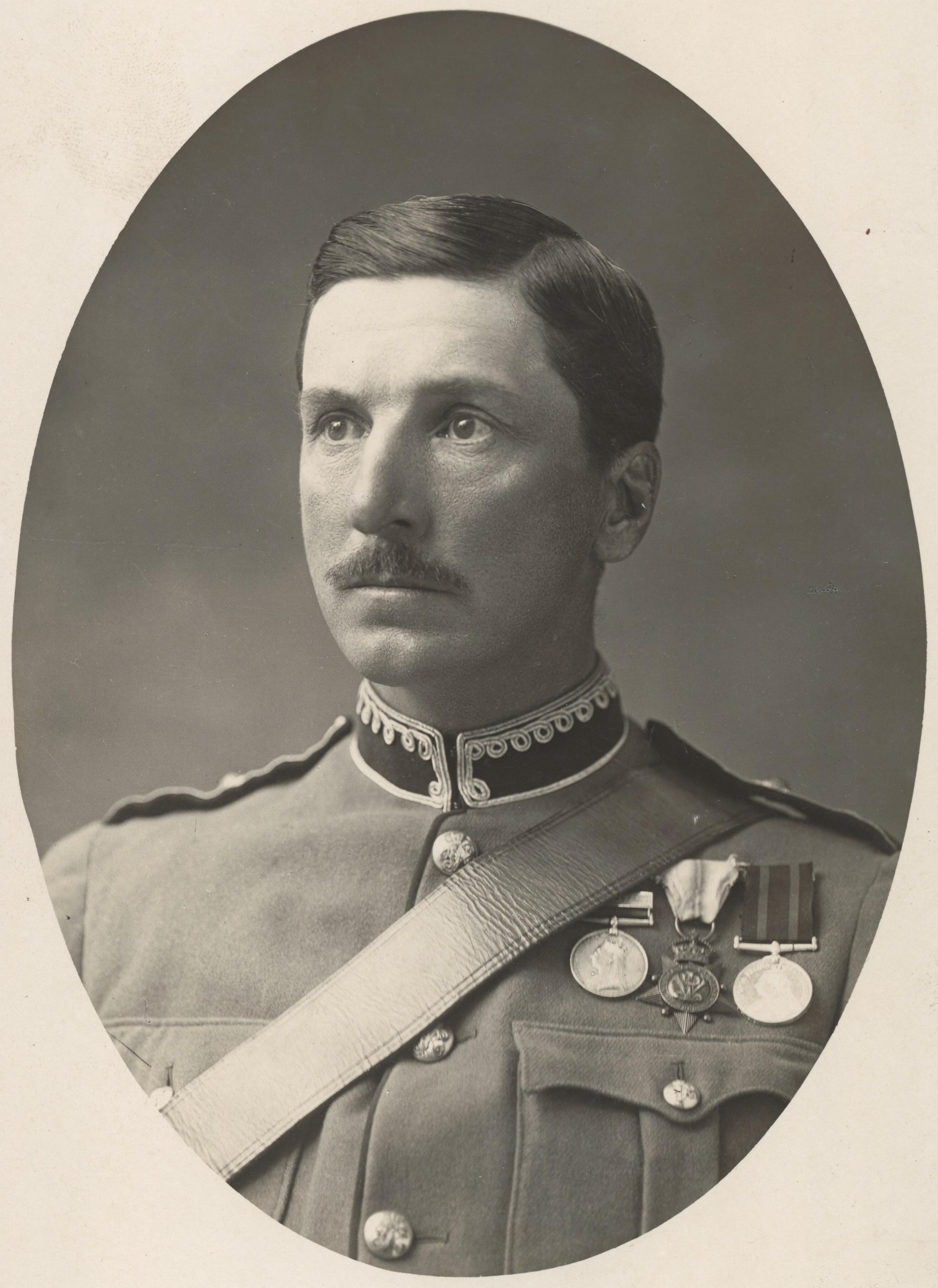

Senator for Tasmania
- In office 29 March 1901 – 31 December 1903
- In office 1 January 1907 – 30 June 1913

Personal details
- Born: 5 December 1857 Nile, Tasmania
- Died: 22 December 1941 (aged 84) Nile, Tasmania, Australia
- Party: Protectionist (1901–03); Anti-Socialist (1906–09); Liberal (1909–13)
- Relations: Norman Cameron (brother)
- Occupation: Soldier, pastoralist

Military service
- Allegiance: United Kingdom; Australia
- Branch/service: British Army; Australian Military Forces
- Years of service: 1877–1894; 1899–1916
- Rank: Colonel
- Commands: 26th Light Horse Regiment; 12th Light Horse Regiment
- Battles/wars: Second Anglo-Afghan War; Second Boer War; First World War
- Awards: Companion of the Order of the Bath

Colonel Cyril St Clair Cameron, CB (5 December 1857 – 22 December 1941) was an Australian soldier and politician. He was a Senator for Tasmania from 1901 to 1903 and again from 1907 to 1913.

== Early life ==
Cameron was born on 5 December 1857 at Fordon, his family's grazing property near Nile, Tasmania. He was one of four children born to Mary (née Morrison) and Donald Cameron. His paternal grandfather, also Donald Cameron, was a Scottish naval surgeon who had settled in Van Diemen's Land in 1822 and established Fordon the following year.

Cameron's father was elected to the Tasmanian Legislative Council in 1868 and his older brother Norman Cameron later served alongside him in federal parliament. He was educated at Launceston Church Grammar School and also spent time in Edinburgh.

== Military service ==
Cameron served in Afghanistan 1878–1880 and South Africa during the Second Boer War in 1899–1900, rising to rank of colonel in the Australian Imperial Force. He was later aide-de-camp to the Governor-General and warden of Evandale. He was made a Companion of the Order of the Bath in 1901 for his service with the Tasmanian Mounted Infantry during the Boer War.

== Politics ==
In 1901 he was elected to the Australian Senate as a Protectionist Senator for Tasmania. His brother, Norman Cameron, was elected to the House of Representatives at the same election as a Free Trader. He was defeated in 1903 but was re-elected as an Anti-Socialist in 1906.

In 1912, Cameron was denied Senate preselection by the Tasmanian Liberal League for his refusal to sign a pledge agreeing not to stand against the successful candidates if not chosen. He recontested his Senate seat at the 1913 federal election, self-identifying as an "Independent Liberal". He polled only around two percent of the statewide vote, with his term expiring on 30 June 1913.

== Personal life ==
In 1887, Cameron married Margaret Honeywood Hughes, a daughter of General Sir William Templer Hughes of the British Indian Army. The couple had five children together, including Lieutenant Colonel Donald Cameron (1888–1979) who was awarded the Military Cross and appointed an Officer of the Order of the British Empire. He was predeceased by two of his sons: Cyril, who died at the Battle of Neuve Chapelle in 1915, and Ewan who died in 1941.

Cameron retired to "Fordon", also spending time at his mansion "Lowestoft" near Berriedale. He died on 22 December 1941, aged 84.
