= Edmund Jowett =

Australian politician

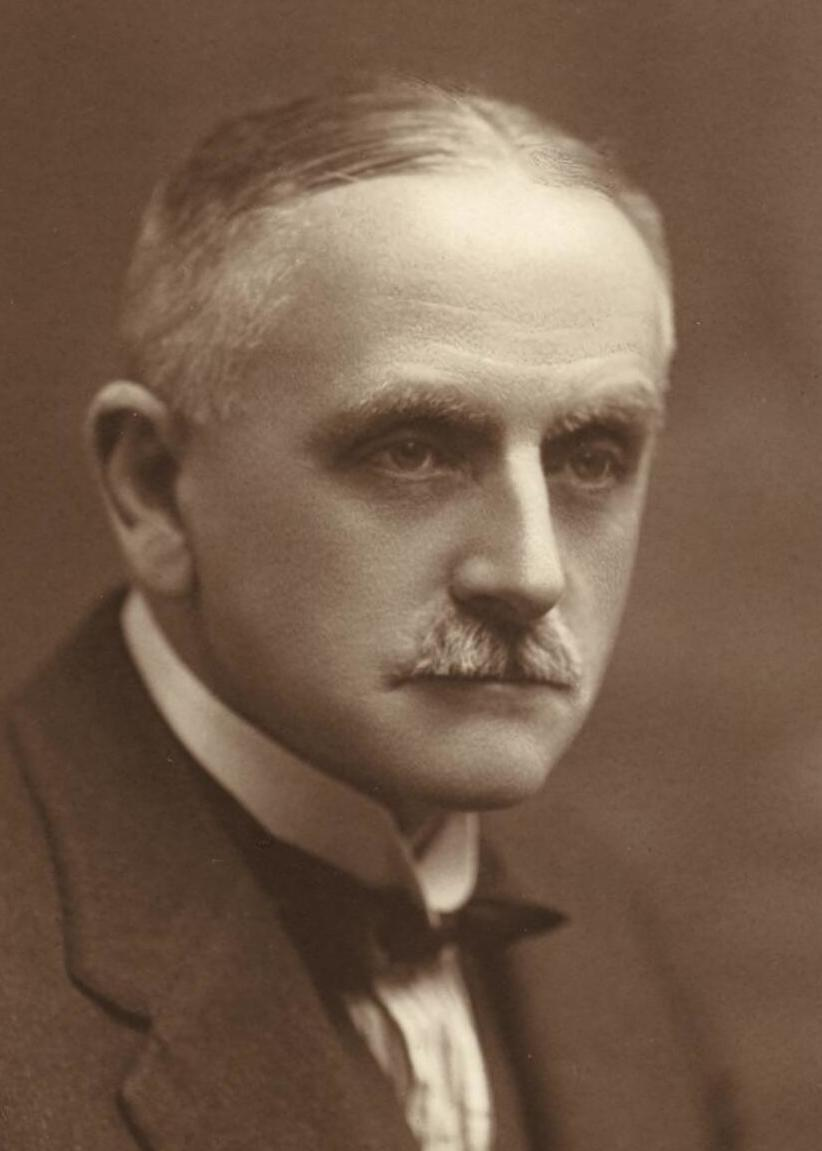

Deputy Leader of the Country Party
- In office 25 February 1920 – 5 April 1921
- Leader: William McWilliams
- Preceded by: New office
- Succeeded by: Henry Gregory

Member of the Australian Parliament for Grampians
- In office 27 October 1917 – 16 December 1922
- Preceded by: Carty Salmon
- Succeeded by: Division abolished

Personal details
- Born: 6 January 1858 Bradford, Yorkshire, England
- Died: 14 April 1936 (aged 78) Leyburn, Queensland, Australia
- Party: Nationalist (1917–19); Country (1919–22)
- Spouse: Annette Rose McCallum (m. 1883)
- Relations: David Fairbairn (grandson)
- Occupation: Pastoralist
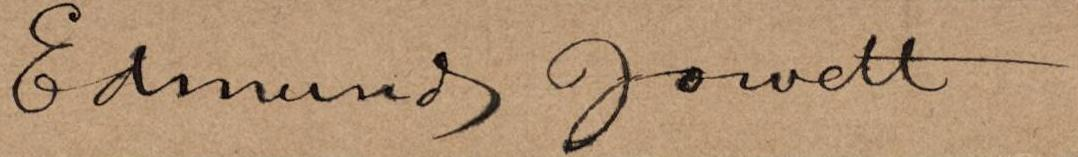
- Signature

Edmund Jowett (6 January 1858 – 14 April 1936) was an Australian pastoralist and politician. He was born in England and arrived in Australia at the age of 18, eventually amassing vast pastoral holdings across Victoria, New South Wales, and Queensland. Jowett was elected to federal parliament at the 1917 Grampians by-election, as a Nationalist. He joined the Country Party upon its formation in 1920. He served as the party's inaugural deputy leader for just over one year, on a provisional basis under the leadership of William McWilliams.

== Early life ==
Jowett was born in Bradford, Yorkshire, England, on 6 January 1858 to Joseph Jowett and Sarah, née Craven. He attended Mr James Ward's Classical School at Clapham Common in London and went to his uncle's wool mill at Thornton. He migrated to Melbourne in Australia in 1876 with his father and elder brother Charles, where he worked on The Argus and contributed to the Australasian Banking Record. He married Annette Rose McCallum on 24 November 1883 at East St Kilda.

== Pastoralist ==
Jowett gradually accumulated property in Queensland, New South Wales and Victoria, eventually controlling more than forty properties including Palparara, Boorara and Kynuna Stations and owned over six million acres (24,000 km^{2}). The Bulletin stated at his death that he had owned more sheep than anyone in the world. He was appointed growers' representative on the Central Wool Committee (a wartime institution) in 1916, and also served on the Commonwealth Bureau of Commerce and Industry and the Victorian Meat Advisory Committee.

== Politics ==
Jowett was influenced as a young man by Sir Frederick Sargood; his early political activity consists of membership of the Young Victorian Patriotic League and campaigning for conscription. In 1917 he became the first Victorian vice-president of the Nationalist Party; in the election of that year he unsuccessfully contested the seat of Maribyrnong. However, in October he won the by-election for the seat of Grampians that followed the death of Carty Salmon, and became a member of the Country Party in 1920.

On 25 February 1920, Jowett was elected unopposed as the inaugural deputy leader of the Country Party, with William McWilliams as leader. He did not re-contest the position when it was declared vacant on 5 April 1921, and was succeeded by Henry Gregory. His seat was abolished in 1922, and he contested Bendigo instead, but was unsuccessful. He continued to be active in the Country Party.

== Later life ==
An advocate of electoral reform and proportional representation, Jowett always encouraged the immigration of Britons to Australia. He also produced a number of publications, and was a company director for some years. On 14 April 1936 he died at Strathane, one of his properties in the Queensland district of Leyburn, and was buried at St Kilda. He was survived by his wife, a son and three daughters.

One of his grandsons was the cabinet minister David Fairbairn.

== Publications ==
- The Unnatural Fall in Prices Due to Currency Legislation (1895)
- The Ruinous Fall in the Prices of Produce and the Prevailing Scarcity of Money (1894)
- Electoral reform for Australia (1917)
- Proportional Representation for the Senate (1919)

== Sources ==
- Rydon, Joan (1983). "Jowett, Edmund (1858 - 1936)". Australian Dictionary of Biography. National Centre of Biography, Australian National University. ISBN 978-0-522-84459-7. ISSN 1833-7538. OCLC 70677943.

Parliament of Australia
Preceded by Carty Salmon	Member for Grampians; 1917–1922	Division abolished
Party political offices
New political party	Deputy Leader of the Australian Country Party; 1920–1921	Succeeded by Henry Gregory
