= Edward Jolley =

Australian politician

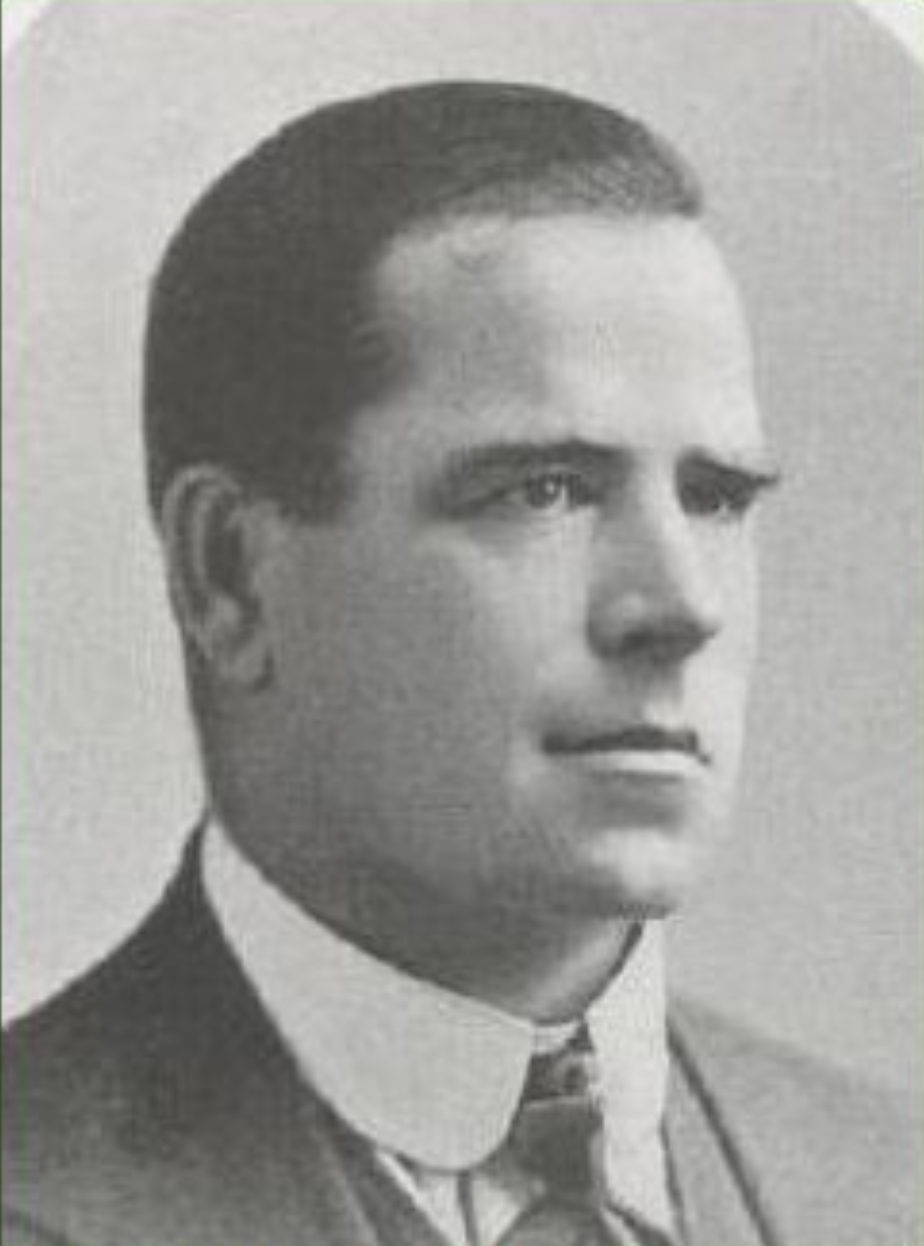

Member of the Australian Parliament for Grampians
- In office 5 September 1914 – 1 January 1915
- Preceded by: Hans Irvine
- Succeeded by: Carty Salmon

Personal details
- Born: 1874 Maryborough, Victoria
- Died: 1 January 1915 (aged 40–41)
- Party: Australian Labor Party
- Education: University of Melbourne
- Occupation: Lawyer

Edward Francis George Jolley (1874 – 1 January 1915) was an Australian politician. He was an Australian Labor Party member of the Australian House of Representatives from September 1914 until his death in January 1915, representing the electoral of Grampians.

Jolley was born in Maryborough, Victoria and was initially educated at Maryborough Primary School, St. Augustine's Catholic School and W. N. Lacey's private school. At the age of 12, Jolley won a scholarship to attend Xavier College in Melbourne. He was both school captain and dux in 1889 and 1890 and also gained the University Exhibition in English and honours in classics. He then won a scholarship to Ormond College at the University of Melbourne, where he won a succession of awards: honours in English Part 1 and Latin Part 1 in 1891, first in the first class with an exhibition in history and jurisprudence and the prize for British Empire history in 1892, and in 1893-94 passed his final honours examination with the only first class for history, political economy and jurisprudence and won the school scholarship, the Wyselaskie prize for English constitutional law and the Cobden Club Medal for political economy. He received his Bachelor of Arts in 1894, his Bachelor of Laws and Master of Arts in 1896 and his Master of Laws in 1899.

Following the completion of his studies, Jolley became a barrister and solicitor, practising first at Avoca and then for many years at Maryborough, largely in criminal law. He also wrote for The Bulletin, was president of the Maryborough Technical School Council, the Advisory Council of the Maryborough District High School and the Maryborough branch of the Australian Natives' Association and was involved in the Maryborough Dramatic Society.

In 1914, he was elected to the Australian House of Representatives as the Labor member for Grampians, narrowly defeating sitting Liberal Hans Irvine after an intense campaign. His victory in the conservative rural seat was celebrated by Labor supporters, and was the only time in the seat's 22-year history that it was won by Labor. However, Jolley became almost immediately unwell following the first sitting of parliament with what was variously described as "prostration" or a nervous breakdown, and remained ill until he died of a brain haemorrhage at Maryborough a few months later, on New Year's Day 1915. He was buried at Maryborough Cemetery.

Parliament of Australia
| Preceded by Hans Irvine | Member for Grampians; 1914–1915 | Succeeded by Carty Salmon |
