= Cornelius Ahern =

Australian politician

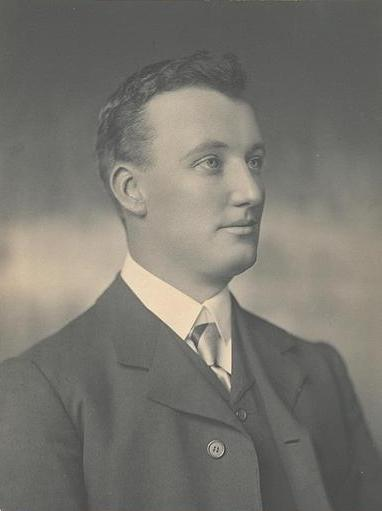

Member of the Australian Parliament for Indi
- In office 31 May 1913 – 5 September 1914
- Preceded by: Parker Moloney
- Succeeded by: Parker Moloney

Personal details
- Born: 10 July 1871 Victoria
- Died: 10 July 1955 (aged 84)
- Party: Commonwealth Liberal Party
- Occupation: Solicitor

Cornelius Joseph Ahern (10 July 1871 – 10 July 1955) was an Australian politician. Born in Victoria, he was educated at Xavier College in Melbourne and became a solicitor in Wangaratta. In 1913, he was elected to the Australian House of Representatives as the Liberal member for Indi, defeating the sitting Labor MP Parker Moloney. He was defeated by Moloney the following year, and retired from politics, becoming an insurance company director in Melbourne. Ahern died on his birthday in 1955.

Parliament of Australia
Preceded by Parker Moloney	Member for Indi; 1913–1914	Succeeded by Parker Moloney
