= Division of Dampier =

Former Australian federal electoral division

Dampier Australian House of Representatives Division
- Created: 1913
- Abolished: 1922
- Namesake: William Dampier

The Division of Dampier was an Australian Electoral Division in Western Australia. The seat was created in 1913 and abolished in 1922. It was named for the navigator William Dampier, the first Englishman to see Australia, and was located in rural Western Australia, including the towns of Northam and Toodyay. It was a safe seat for the non-Labor parties.

== Members ==
Image	Member	Party	Term	Notes
	Henry Gregory (1860–1940)	Liberal	31 May 1913 – 17 February 1917	Previously held the Western Australian Legislative Assembly seat of Menzies. Transferred to the Division of Swan after Dampier was abolished in 1922
	Henry Gregory (1860–1940)	Nationalist	17 February 1917 – 22 January 1920	Previously held the Western Australian Legislative Assembly seat of Menzies. Transferred to the Division of Swan after Dampier was abolished in 1922
	Henry Gregory (1860–1940)	Country	22 January 1920 – 16 December 1922	Previously held the Western Australian Legislative Assembly seat of Menzies. Transferred to the Division of Swan after Dampier was abolished in 1922
