= William Archibald (politician) =

Australian politician (1850–1926)

The Honourable William Archibald
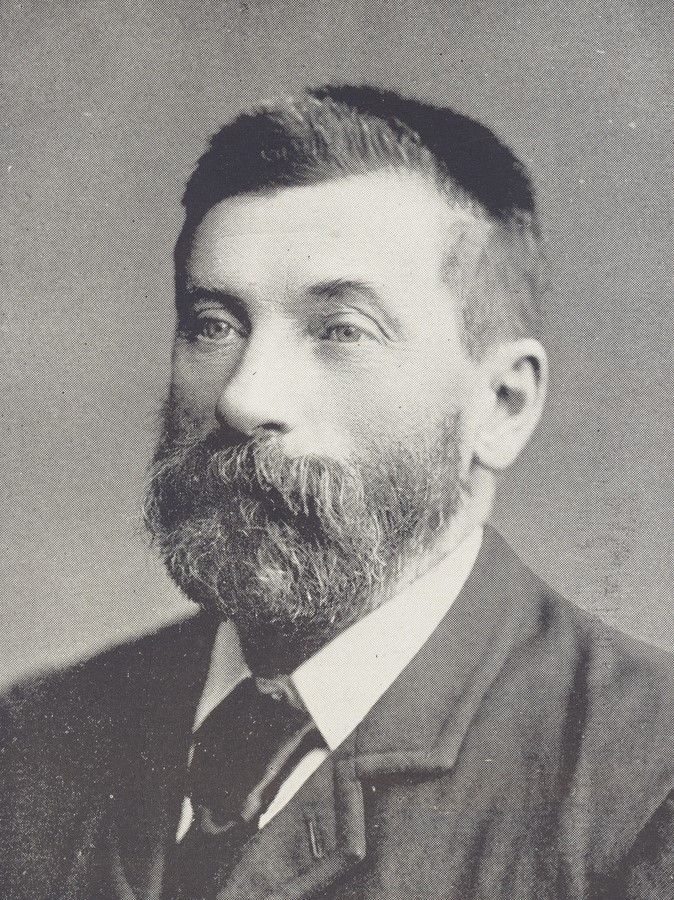

Minister for Trade and Customs
- In office 14 November 1916 – 17 February 1917
- Prime Minister: Billy Hughes
- Preceded by: Frank Tudor
- Succeeded by: Jens Jensen

Minister for Home Affairs
- In office 17 September 1914 – 27 October 1915
- Prime Minister: Andrew Fisher
- Preceded by: Joseph Cook
- Succeeded by: King O'Malley

Member of the Australian Parliament for Hindmarsh
- In office 13 April 1910 – 13 December 1919
- Preceded by: James Hutchison
- Succeeded by: Norman Makin

Member of the South Australian Parliament for Port Adelaide
- In office 15 April 1893 – 2 April 1910
- Preceded by: William Mattinson
- Succeeded by: Thompson Green

Personal details
- Born: 3 June 1850 St Pancras, London, England
- Died: 28 June 1926 (aged 76) Adelaide, South Australia, Australia
- Party: Labor (1893–17); Nationalist (1917–19)
- Spouse(s): 1) Rose Owens; 2) Elizabeth Pollard; 3) Marie Schmett
- Occupation: Various

William Oliver Archibald (3 June 1850 – 28 June 1926) was an Australian politician. He was a member of the South Australian House of Assembly from 1893 to 1910, representing Port Adelaide, and a member of the Australian House of Representatives from 1910 to 1919, representing Hindmarsh. Archibald was a Labor member until resigning in the 1916 Labor split; he subsequently served as a Nationalist until his defeat at the 1919 federal election.

== Early life ==
Born in St Pancras, London, Archibald was orphaned at 10 and educated to primary school level in England, then worked as an apprentice piano builder before emigrating first to New Zealand in 1879 and thence to New South Wales and Victoria in 1881 before arriving in South Australia in 1882.

Archibald was initially employed on the Port Adelaide wharves before working for the South Australian Government Railway workshop, where he was elected to the executive council of the Railway Services Mutual Association.

== Political career ==
A foundation member of the United Labor Party (the predecessor of the Australian Labor Party), Archibald gained pre-selection for the South Australian House of Assembly Electoral district of Port Adelaide and was comfortably elected at the 1893 election.

Archibald rose to prominence in parliament and gained a reputation as a "hard-working member who always thoroughly mastered his subject". He also successfully introduced a number of important bills into parliament, including legislation on social issues like the establishment of public libraries, worker's compensation and rent relief. Archibald also served as President of the South Australian branch of the Labor Party from 1901 to 1902 and Caucus chairman from 1905 to 1908.

Archibald retired from state parliament in 1910 in order to stand as the Labor candidate for the safe federal seat of Hindmarsh at the 1910 federal election. He was elected unopposed.

After travelling to England as an official Australian parliament representative to the coronation of King George V in 1911, Archibald was re-elected in 1913 and 1914 and appointed Minister for Home Affairs by Prime Minister Andrew Fisher.

In 1916, an internal party row over conscription led to a split in the ALP and Archibald, along with Prime Minister and Labor leader Billy Hughes, left the ALP to form the National Labor Party. For his support, Hughes appointed Archibald Minister for Trade and Customs in the short lived Second Hughes Ministry. Archibald followed Hughes into the Nationalist Party of Australia later in 1917. He narrowly won reelection as a Nationalist in the election held later that year. However, Hindmarsh was naturally a Labor seat, and he was defeated by Labor's Norman Makin in the 1919 general election.

== Late life ==
The three-times-married Archibald worked as a book-seller in Semaphore until his retirement and died in Adelaide in 1926. He was survived by his third wife and a son and daughter from his first marriage.

Political offices
Preceded by Joseph Cook	Minister for Home Affairs; 1914 – 1915	Succeeded by King O'Malley
Preceded by Billy Hughes	Minister for Trade and Customs; 1916 – 1917	Succeeded by Jens Jensen
Parliament of Australia
Preceded by James Hutchison	Member for Hindmarsh; 1910 – 1919	Succeeded by Norman Makin
