= Hugh Sinclair (politician) =

Australian politician

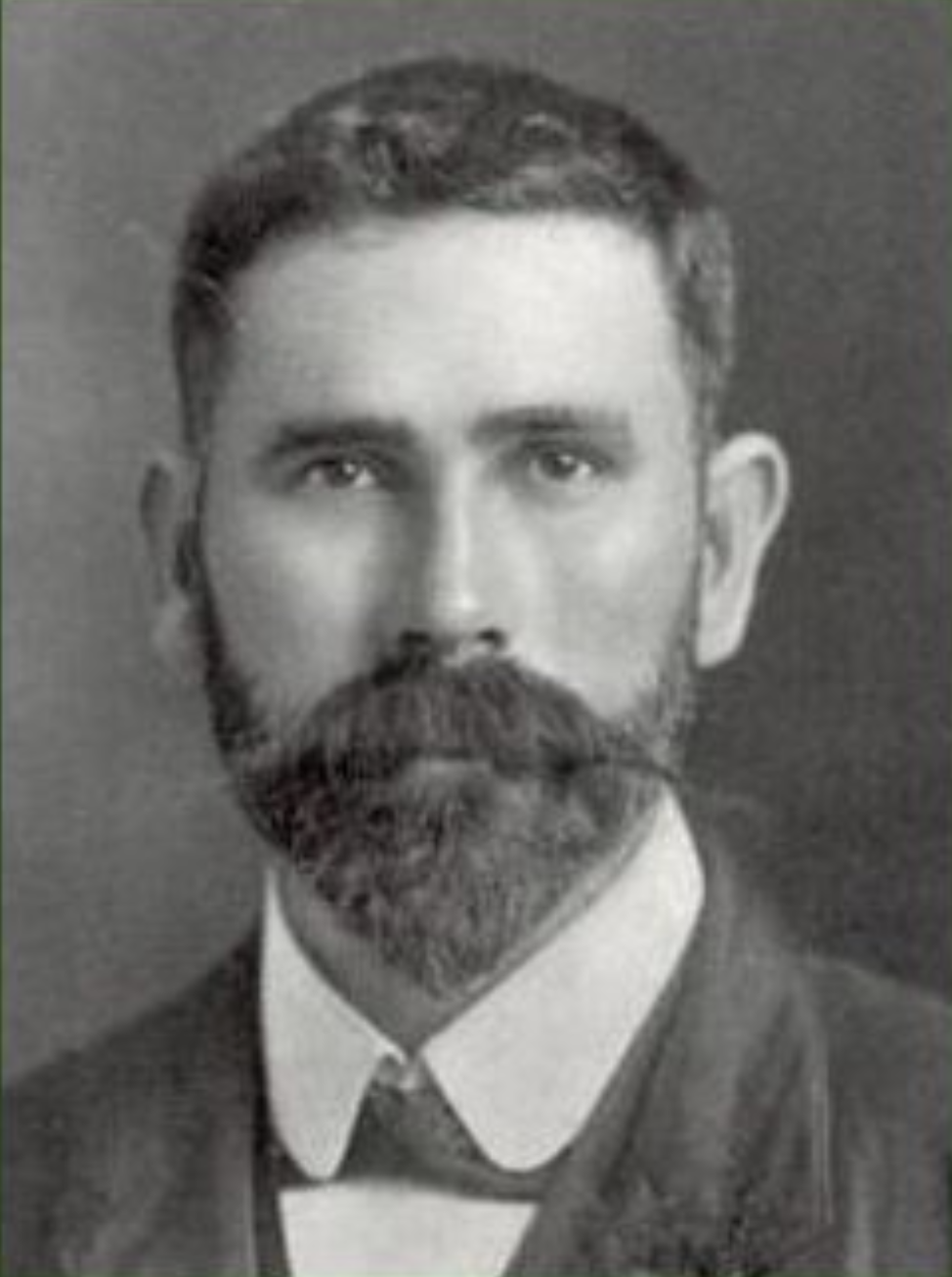

Member of the Australian Parliament for Moreton
- In office 12 December 1906 – 3 November 1919
- Preceded by: James Wilkinson
- Succeeded by: Arnold Wienholt

Personal details
- Born: 6 June 1864 Cambewarra, New South Wales
- Died: 3 August 1926 (aged 62)
- Party: Anti-Socialist (1906–09); Liberal (1909–17); Nationalist (1917–19)
- Occupation: Farmer, company manager

Hugh Sinclair (6 June 1864 – 3 August 1926) was an Australian politician. He was a member of the Australian House of Representatives from 1906 until 1919, representing the electorate of Moreton for the Anti-Socialist Party and its successors the Commonwealth Liberal Party and Nationalist Party.

Sinclair was born at Cambewarra on the South Coast of New South Wales and was raised on his family's farm. He took an interest in the development of dairy co-operatives in the region and became a successful butter factory manager, at the Bengelala Dairy Company and Foley Bros. Cambewarra factories, then Foley Bros. creamery in Sydney, before becoming district manager of the Australian Dairying Company Ltd in the Manning River area for three years. In 1901, he relocated to Ipswich in Queensland as manager of the Queensland Farmers Co-operative Dairy Company, later expanding its operations across the region. He was one of the foundation members of the Ipswich Oddfellows' Lodge and was a member of the Ipswich Masonic Lodge.

In 1906, he was elected to the Australian House of Representatives as the Anti-Socialist member for Moreton. After the "fusion" of 1909, Sinclair, together with the rest of the Anti-Socialists, merged with the Protectionist Party to form the Commonwealth Liberal Party, which in turn merged into the Nationalist Party in 1917. During his time in federal parliament, he was chairman of a Royal Commission into electoral laws and was the deputy chairman and then chairman of the Commonwealth Dairy Produce Pool Committee. Sinclair held Moreton until his retirement due to ill health in 1919. He reported upon standing down that he had been very ill and that his doctors had warned him against recontesting his seat.

After his retirement, he was contracted by the federal government as one of a number of butter factory representatives to visit England and make arrangements to contract with the British Government to purchase Australia's surplus butter. He later retired to Melbourne, where he died at his North Fitzroy home in 1926; he had reportedly been in "indifferent health" for some time.

He was married to Mary Sinclair (died 1941); they had one son and eight daughters. His granddaughter, Heather Bonner, would go on to be an indigenous rights activist and the second wife of Neville Bonner, the first Aboriginal member of the Australian Senate. His niece Zara Dare in 1931 became one of the first two female police officers in Queensland.

Parliament of Australia
Preceded by James Wilkinson	Member for Moreton; 1906 – 1919	Succeeded by Arnold Wienholt
