= William Finlayson (Australian politician) =

Australian politician (1867–1955)

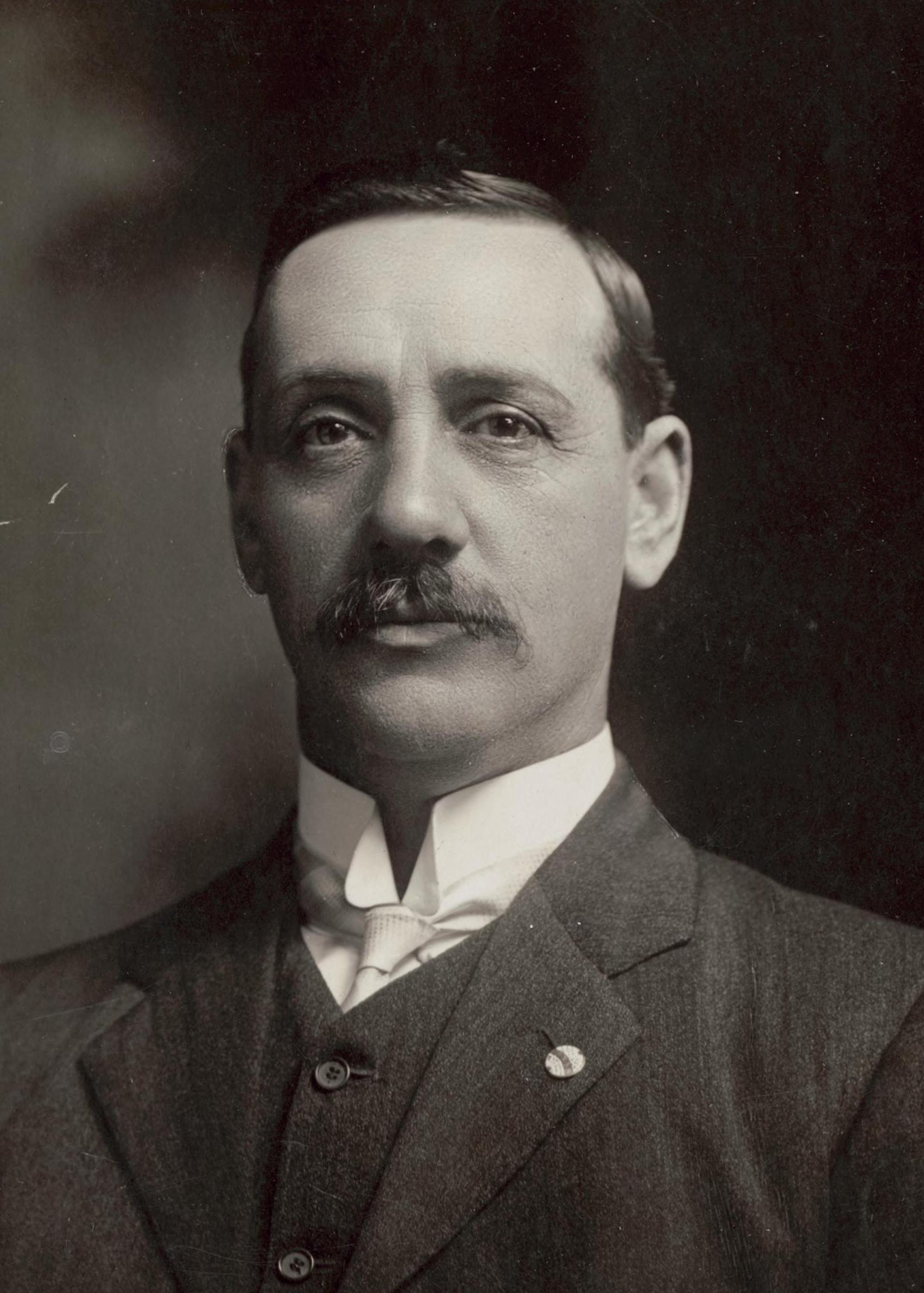

Member of the Australian Parliament for Brisbane
- In office 13 April 1910 – 13 December 1919
- Preceded by: Justin Foxton
- Succeeded by: Donald Cameron

Member of the Queensland Legislative Council
- In office 19 February 1920 – 23 March 1922

Personal details
- Born: 12 August 1867 Kilsyth, Stirlingshire, Scotland
- Died: 13 January 1955 (aged 87) Melbourne, Victoria, Australia
- Party: Labor
- Occupation: Grocer

William Fyfe Finlayson (12 August 1867 – 13 January 1955) was an Australian politician. He was an Australian Labor Party member of the Australian House of Representatives from 1910 to 1919 and a member of the Queensland Legislative Council from 1920 to 1922.

== Early life ==
Finlayson was born on 12 August 1867 in Kilsyth, Stirlingshire (now in North Lanarkshire), Scotland, the son of Malcolm Finlayson and his wife Christine (née Fergus). He was educated there before becoming an apprentice grocer. Together with his parents and siblings, he immigrated to Brisbane on the Duke of Devonshire arriving on 13 September 1887. He started a wholesale and retail fruit business in George Street with his brother, left in 1895 after a trip to the United States to set up a branch of the business in Maryborough, before returning to the Brisbane business as junior partner c. 1903 following a prolonged trip to Scotland. He was active in church work, was Queensland Grand Secretary of the International Organisation of Good Templars and was also a trade unionist, serving as president of the Hairdressers' Employees Federation.

== Politics ==
In 1910, Finlayson was elected to the Australian House of Representatives as the Labor member for Brisbane, defeating Liberal minister Justin Foxton. In parliament, he was a member of the Royal Commission on the Fruit Industry from 1912 to 1914 and a member of the Standing Committee on Public Works from 1914 to 1917. He was a staunch opponent of conscription during the 1916 conscription referendum. He was involved in a key moment of the 1916 Labor split that followed the referendum result, when on 14 November 1916 he moved a successful motion to expel Prime Minister Billy Hughes from the Labor caucus, leading Hughes and his supporters to form a non-Labor ministry with their former opponents on 15 November. He held the seat until his defeat in 1919.

In 1920 Finlayson was appointed to the Queensland Legislative Council and was one of the Labor members who successfully voted for its abolition in 1922. An attempt to win Labor preselection for his old federal seat in 1925 was ruled ineligible due to his ties to the Victorian Anti-Liquor League, which had endorsed a non-Labor candidate for the Melbourne City Council.

Finlayson relocated to Victoria during the 1920s, making an unsuccessful Labor candidacy for the conservative Victorian Legislative Assembly seat of Brighton at a 1928 by-election and serving as a City of Heidelberg councillor during the 1930s. He was an influential member of the Victorian General Assembly of the Presbyterian Church of Australia and was the convenor of its temperance committee.

== Temperance movement ==
Finlayson was a staunch campaigner for the prohibition of alcohol throughout his life, and at the peak of the Prohibition movement in the 1920s was known as one of Australia's leading prohibitionists, serving as secretary of the Australian Prohibition Council, superintendent of the Victorian Prohibition League, industrial organiser for the Anti-Saloon League of Victoria, and touring Australia campaigning for Prohibition. He was Grand Chief Templar of Victoria of the International Organisation of Good Templars and remained an active temperance advocate until his death.

== Personal life ==
Finlayson died in Melbourne in 1955.

Parliament of Australia
Preceded by Justin Foxton	Member for Brisbane; 1910–1919	Succeeded by Donald Charles Cameron
