= Hans Irvine =

Australian politician and vigneron

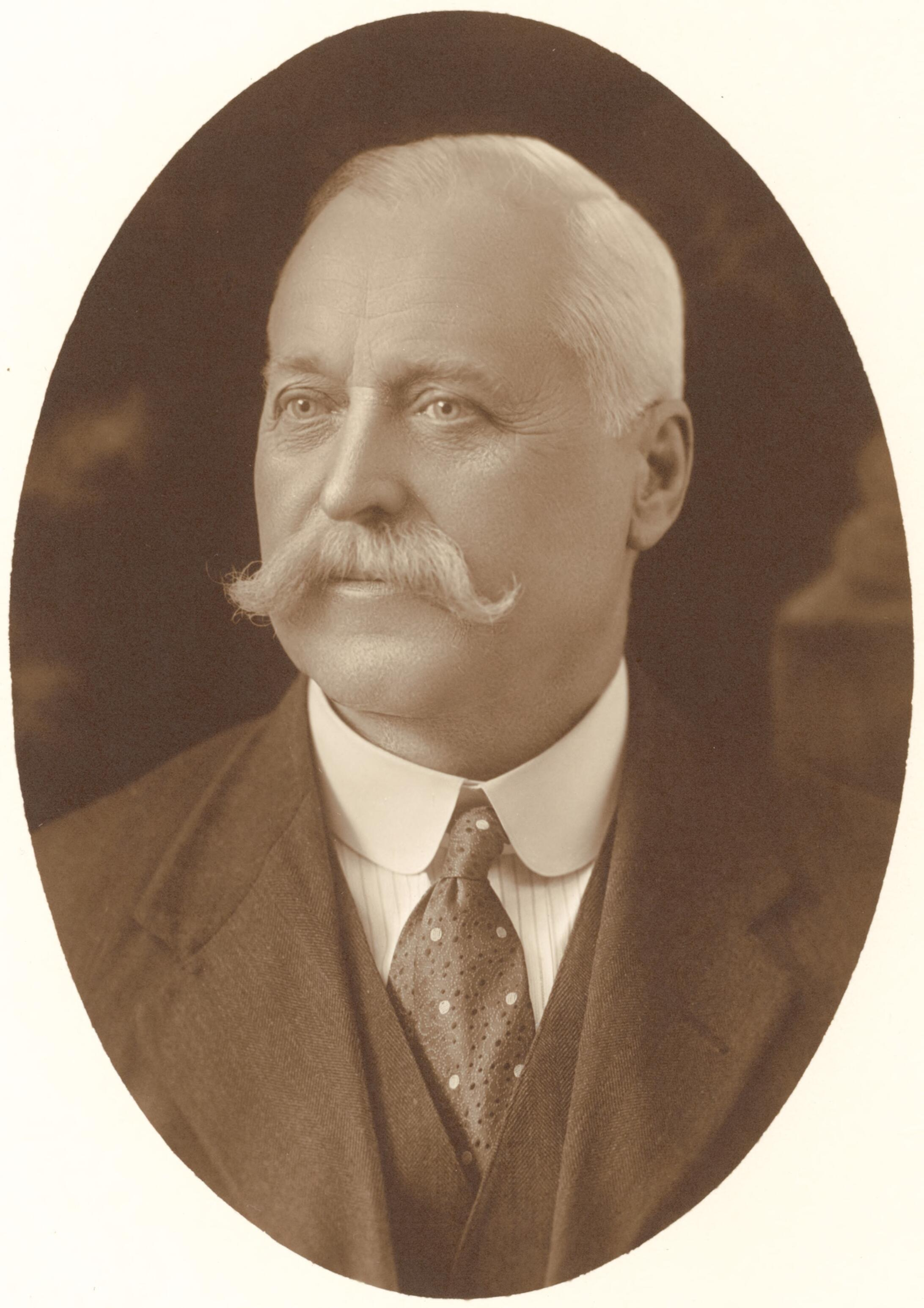

Member of the Australian Parliament for Grampians
- In office 12 December 1906 – 5 September 1914
- Preceded by: Thomas Skene
- Succeeded by: Edward Jolley

Personal details
- Born: 2 August 1856 Melbourne, Victoria
- Died: 11 July 1922 (aged 65) London, England
- Party: Anti-Socialist (1906–09); Liberal (1909–14)
- Spouse: Mary Jane Robinson
- Occupation: Vigneron

Hans William Henry Irvine (2 August 1856 – 11 July 1922) was an Australian vigneron, winemaker, and politician.

== Early life ==
Irvine was born in Melbourne on 2 August 1856 to flour-miller John William Henry Irvine and Mary, née Gray. His father was a flourmiller of Irish parentage who had a business at Learmonth, near Ballarat. Apprenticed to a printing firm in order to learn lithography, Hans was soon foreman and acquired a share in the business. He also joined the Australian Natives' Association. He married Mary Jane Robinson (died 1915) on 7 October 1885 at Ballarat East; the couple had no children.

== Vigneron ==
Irvine's wealth grew as he invested in various enterprises, including land, mining, and viticulture. In 1888, having sold his interest in the printing trade, he purchased the Great Western vineyard of the late Joseph Best and some grazing land, and acquired more land near Arawatta. He was fortunate to obtain the services of the French winemaker, Charles Pierlot, a former employee of the Champagne house of Pommery & Greno. Irvine was well aware of the potential market in Victoria for quality Champagne method sparkling wine and became the leading Australian commercial producer. He traveled to Europe in 1891 to learn of French wine-making practices and the possibilities of a British export market.

Irvine became influential in the wine business in the Great Western area, buying two thirds of local produce in the early 1890s and distilling a considerable amount into brandy. He had 250 acres (1.0 km^{2}) of storage under the Great Western vineyard as well as Melbourne cellars and a London depot.

While Irvine's success grew, the Victorian wine industry was struggling. He suggested a conference in 1894 to discuss problems in the industry and supported moves to establish American root-stocks, which were resistant to phylloxera, into Victoria. In 1899 he won 1st prize at the Greater Britain Exhibition in London. He was the first president of the Viticultural Society of Victoria in 1905; he also produced Report on the Australian Wine Trade in 1892 for the Victorian minister for agriculture.

== Politics ==
In 1901, Irvine was elected to the Victorian Legislative Council, and became known as among the most liberal in the chamber. In 1906 he transferred to the Australian House of Representatives, representing the seat of Grampians as a member of the Anti-Socialist Party. He supported the Protectionist Alfred Deakin, and later joined Deakin's Commonwealth Liberal Party. He was defeated in 1914.

Irvine sold his Great Western enterprise to Benno Seppelt, then head of the South Australian family wine business in 1918 and retired to South Yarra. Seppelt continued the production of sparkling and table wines at Great Western. In 1922 he travelled to England to seak treatment for a gastric ulcer. He died on 11 July of that year in London, following an operation; his body was returned to Australia and buried in Great Western cemetery. His estate was valued for probate at £175,356 (equivalent to $16,300,000 in 2022).

Parliament of Australia
| Preceded by Thomas Skene | Member for Grampians; 1906-1914 | Succeeded by Edward Jolley |
