= John Livingston (Australian politician) =

Australian politician

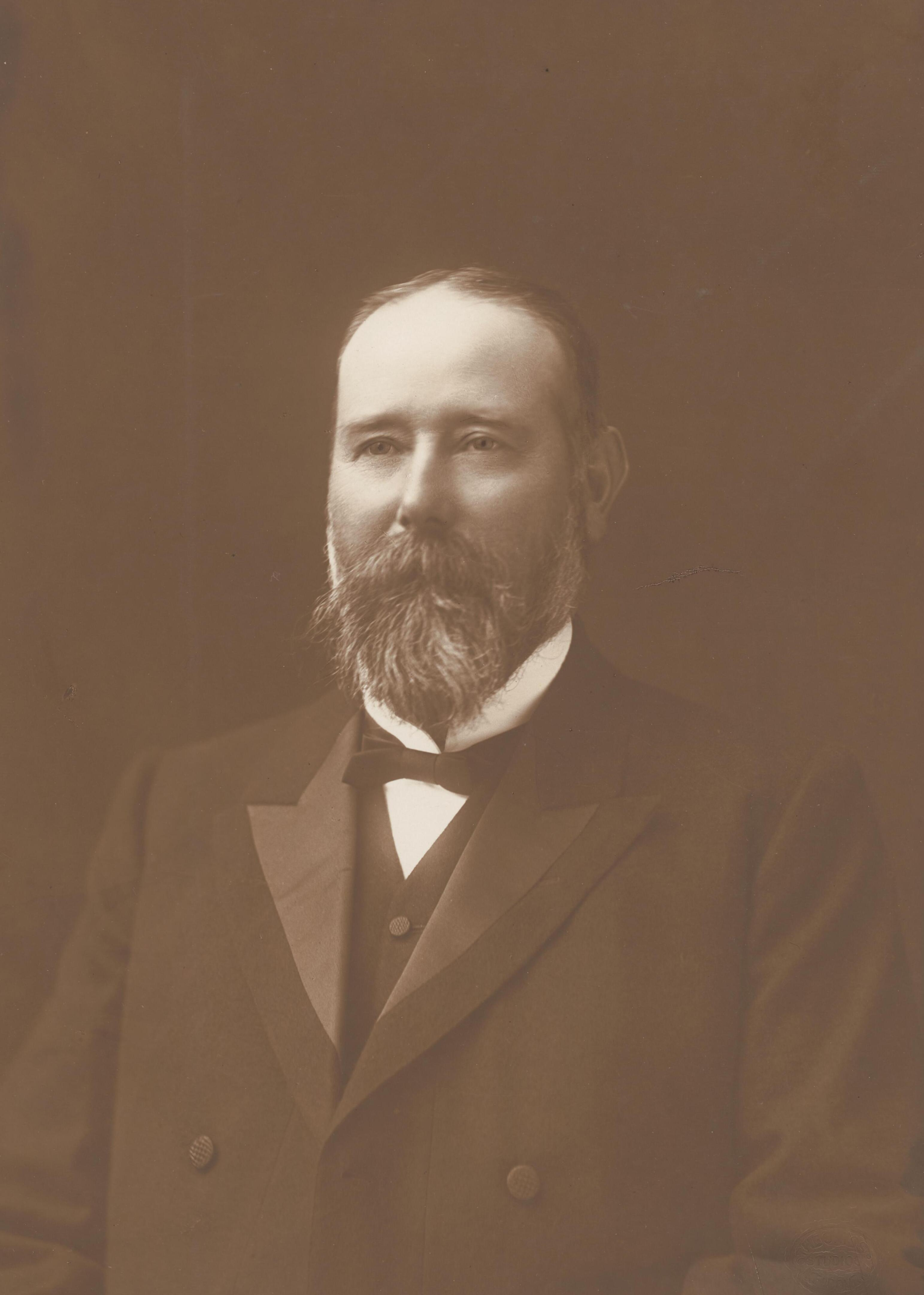

Member of the Australian Parliament for Barker
- In office 12 December 1906 – 6 November 1922
- Preceded by: Langdon Bonython
- Succeeded by: Malcolm Cameron

Personal details
- Born: 19 September 1857 Mount Gambier, South Australia
- Died: 4 September 1935 (aged 77) Melbourne, Victoria
- Party: Anti-Socialist (1906–09); Liberal (1909–17); Nationalist (1917–22)
- Spouse: Eliza Dunn Paltridge
- Relations: William Paltridge (father-in-law)
- Occupation: Farmer

John Livingston (19 September 1857 – 4 September 1935) was an Australian politician. He was a member of the South Australian House of Assembly from 1899 to 1906, and a member of the Australian House of Representatives from 1906 to 1922.

Livingston was born in Mount Gambier, South Australia and educated privately at the family home of Curratum. He worked on farms in New South Wales, Queensland and Victoria and in 1880 explored the Gascoyne River area of northern Western Australia. He married Eliza Dunn Paltridge on 11 June 1884 at the home of her father William Paltridge at Compton, South Australia. In 1898, he auction house in Mount Gambier and he became mayor of Mount Gambier in 1899.

In 1899, Livingston was elected as the member for Victoria in the South Australian House of Assembly and retained the seat after it was renamed to Victoria and Albert in 1902 but lost the seat in 1906.

Livingston won the federal seat of Barker at the 1906 election for the Anti-Socialist Party. From 1909 to 1916 he was a member for the Commonwealth Liberal Party, and from 1916 to 1922 he was a member for the Nationalist Party of Australia. He was a consistent opponent of the construction of Canberra.

Livingston died in Melbourne in 1935 (aged77), survived by his wife, five daughters and two sons.

== Notes ==
Parliament of Australia
Preceded by Langdon Bonython	Member for Barker; 1906–1922	Succeeded by Malcolm Cameron
