= Carty Salmon =

Australian politician (1860–1917)

The Honourable Carty Salmon
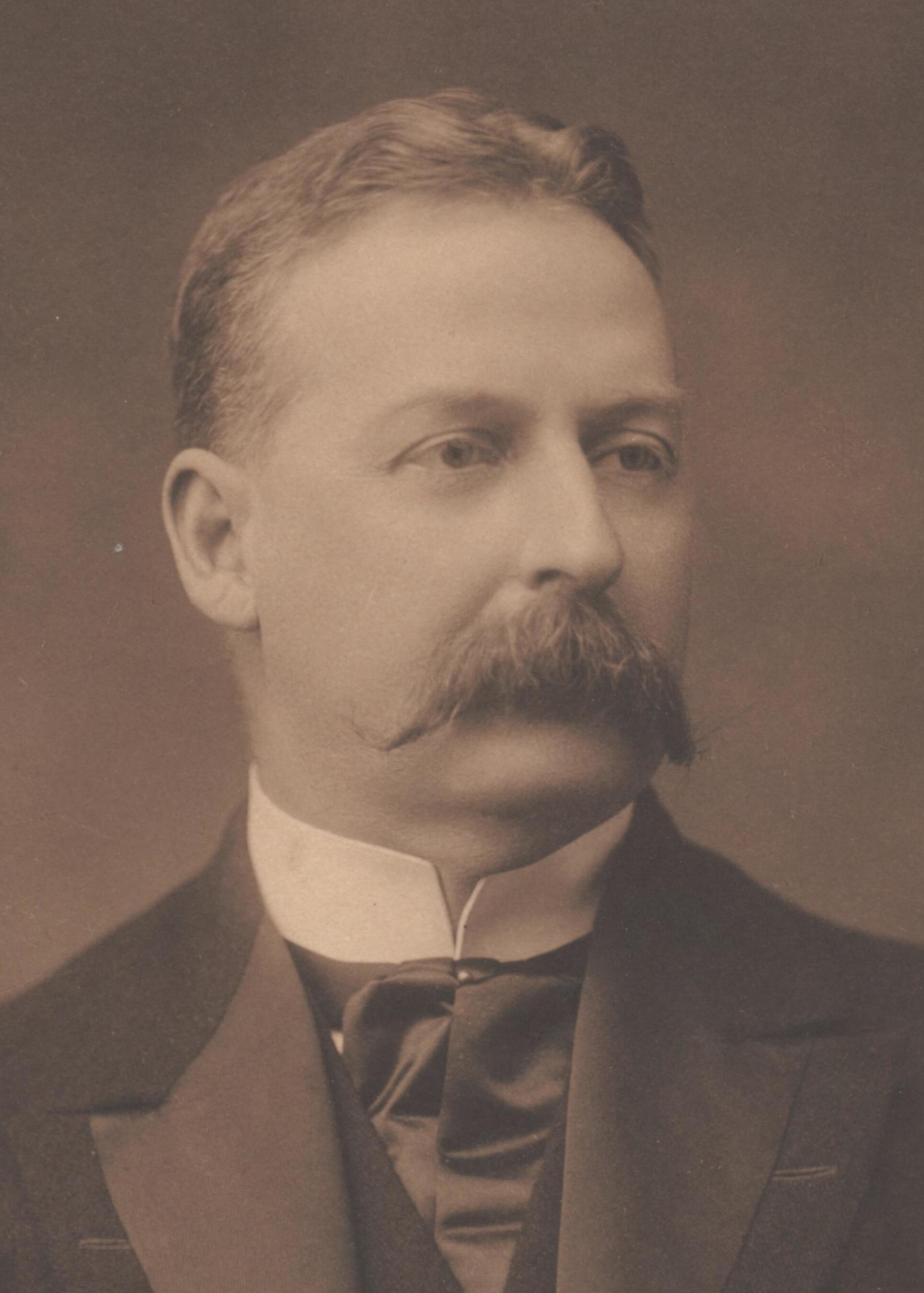

2nd Speaker of the Australian House of Representatives
- In office 23 July 1909 – 30 June 1910
- Preceded by: Frederick Holder
- Succeeded by: Charles McDonald

Member of the Australian Parliament for Grampians
- In office 20 February 1915 – 15 September 1917
- Preceded by: Edward Jolley
- Succeeded by: Edmund Jowett

Member of the Australian Parliament for Laanecoorie
- In office 29 March 1901 – 23 April 1913
- Preceded by: New seat
- Succeeded by: Division abolished

Personal details
- Born: Charles Carty Salmon; 27 July 1860 Amherst, Victoria
- Died: 15 September 1917 (aged 57) South Yarra, Victoria
- Party: Protectionist (1901–09); Liberal (1909–17); Nationalist (1917)
- Spouse: Nancy Anne Harris
- Education: University of Melbourne; Edinburgh Medical School
- Profession: Doctor

Charles Carty Salmon (27 July 1860 – 15 September 1917) was an Australian politician who served as the second speaker of the Australian House of Representatives from 1909 to 1910. A member Protectionist Party for most of his career, he was the member of parliament (MP) for the division of Laanecoorie from 1901 to 1913 and the division of the Grampians from 1915 until his death in 1917.

A doctor by profession, he began his political career in the Victorian Legislative Assembly before winning election to the House of Representatives at the inaugural 1901 federal election. He represented the Protectionist Party initially and then the Liberal Party, serving as Speaker for the duration of the Third Deakin Ministry. Salmon lost his seat in 1913, but returned to the House at a by-election in 1915. He died in office two years later.

== Early life ==
Salmon was born on 27 July 1860 in Amherst, Victoria. He was the sixth child born to Susannah Carty (née Arnell) and Frederick Browne Salmon. His parents were born in England, although his father was said to be "descended from an old Glamorganshire family" from the Welsh village of Penllyn.

Salmon's father had arrived in South Australia in 1849. He later moved to Victoria and profited from the subsequent gold rush, acquiring a grazing property near Talbot. Salmon attended Scotch College, Melbourne. In 1877 he began working for Arnell & Dudgeon, one of the first tobacco manufacturing firms in Australia. It had been co-founded by his uncle and namesake Charles Carty Arnell, who was childless. He was said to have disliked the industry and returned to the family grazing property, but later resumed his association with Arnell & Dudgeon and served as a managing director of the firm, which he combined with his parliamentary career.

In 1886, Salmon enrolled to study medicine at the University of Melbourne, living at Trinity College. After three years he moved to Scotland to attend the University of Edinburgh Medical School. He obtained the qualifications of LRCP, LRCS and LFPS. He then served as a house surgeon at the Royal Hospital for Sick Children, Edinburgh, for a period, and also worked in London. He returned to Australia in 1891 and established a general practice in South Yarra.

== Colonial politics ==
Salmon became interested in politics while studying in Scotland and later developed a friendship with Alfred Deakin through their shared involvement in the South Yarra Relief Committee. Deakin encouraged him to stand for parliament. He was elected to the Victorian Legislative Assembly in May 1894, winning a by-election for the seat of Talbot and Avoca. According to the Australian Dictionary of Biography, "immediately he abandoned medicine for politics and soon identified with the Deakinite liberal causes of anti-sweating legislation, a shorter working week and a high tariff".

Salmon was re-elected at the 1894, 1897 and 1900 general elections. He held ministerial office in the government of Allan McLean, serving briefly as minister without portfolio in 1899 and then as Minister of Public Instruction and Commissioner of Trade and Customs from 1899 to 1900.

== Federal politics ==
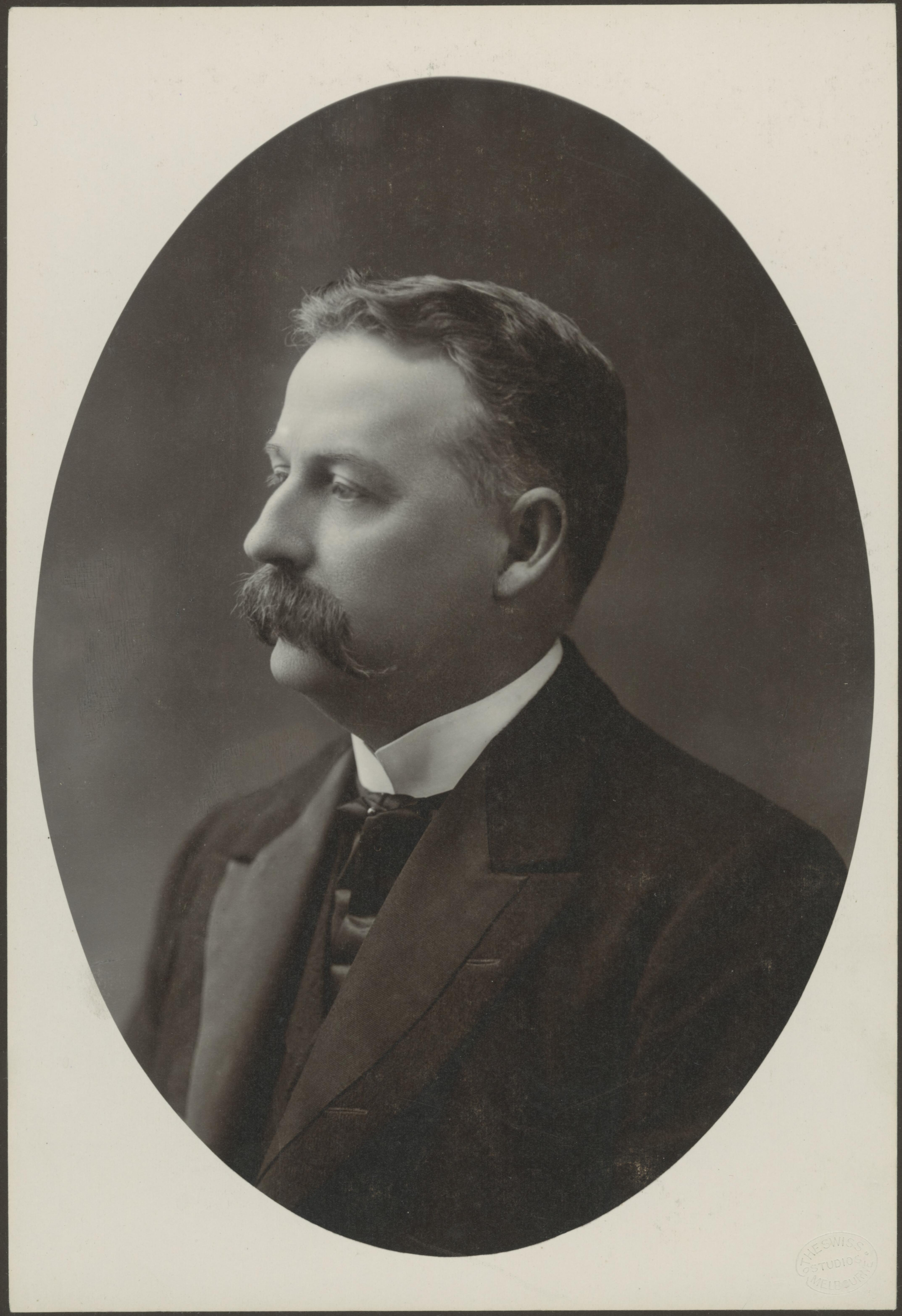
Undated photo

=== Early career ===
In 1901, Salmon resigned from the Victorian parliament to contest the seat of Laanecoorie at the inaugural federal election. He joined Deakin in the Liberal Protectionist Party when parliament sat for the first time.

Salmon was re-elected at the 1903 election. On 17 March 1904 he was elected as chairman of committees, replacing John Chanter who had lost his seat. Chanter, a member of the Australian Labor Party (ALP), was subsequently re-elected at a by-election and unsuccessfully challenged Salmon for the position in August 1905. Salmon was regarded as overly partisan by members of the ALP and the Anti-Socialist Party, at a time when the Protectionists were governing in minority. The House voted to dissent from his rulings on several occasions and on 20 June 1906 he was defeated for re-election as chairman by the ALP candidate Frederick McDonald.

Salmon joined Deakin's new Liberal Party in July 1909 when the Protectionists merged with the Anti-Socialists.

=== Speaker of the House ===
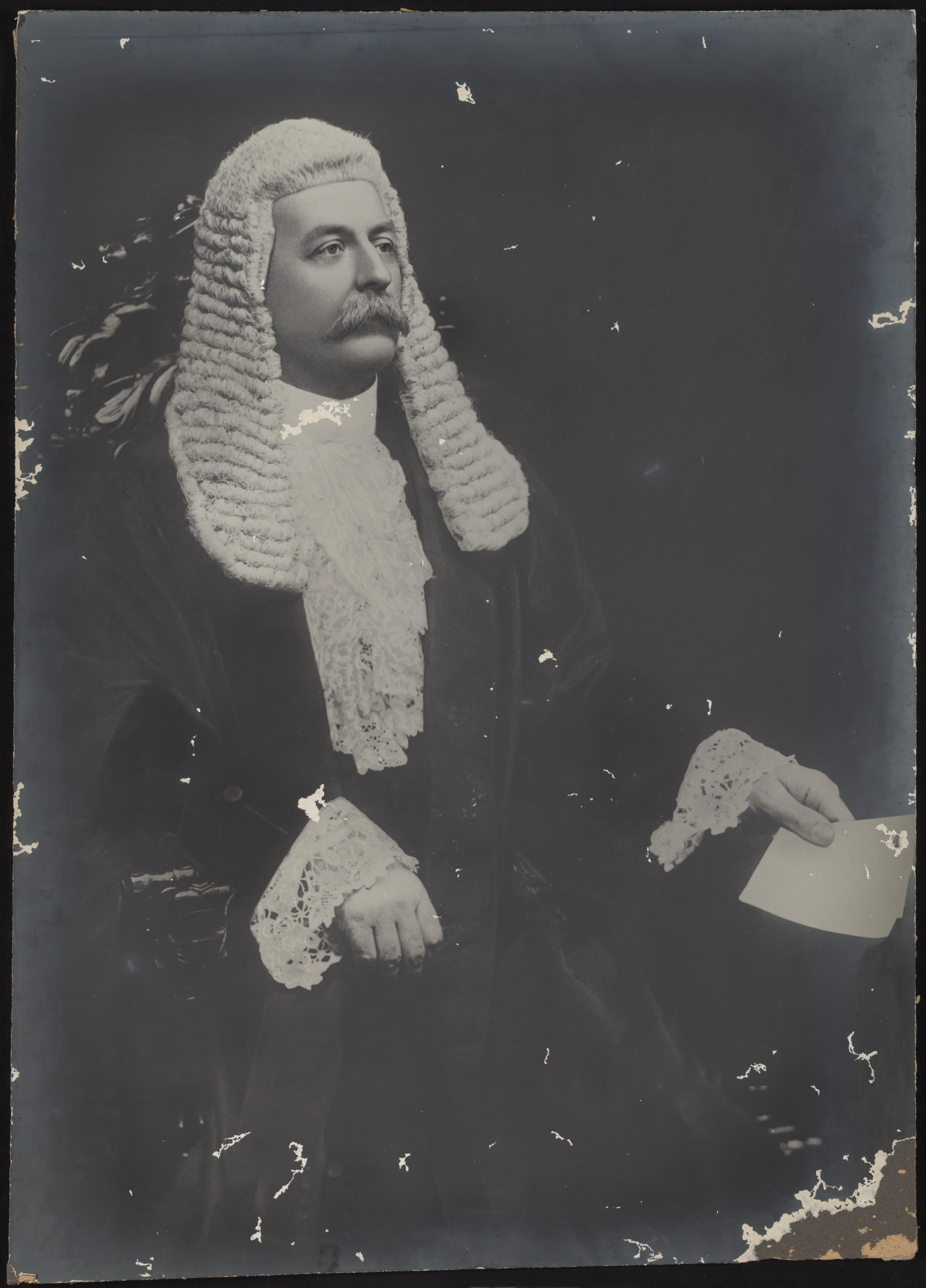
Salmon as Speaker of the House

On 28 July 1909, Salmon was elected speaker of the House of Representatives in succession to Frederick Holder, the inaugural speaker. Holder had died in office in dramatic circumstances five days earlier while presiding over the house, with Salmon attending him in his capacity as a physician.

Salmon's elevation to the speakership was largely at the behest of his close friend Deakin. He narrowly defeated Agar Wynne in a Liberal partyroom ballot, then was elected by 37 votes to 29 following an acrimonious debate presided over by the clerk of the House, Charles Gavan Duffy. The balloting took several hours and the ALP unsuccessfully attempted to engineer Wynne's election, with Billy Hughes describing Salmon as a "notorious partisan". According to Stephen Wilks, the editor of the Biographical Dictionary of the House of Representatives, Salmon's election "is seen as the decisive point in determining that the Australian speakership would not maintain the Westminster ideal" and would become an explicitly partisan office.

Salmon's term as Speaker lasted less than a year, as the Labor Party won the 1910 federal election and elected one of its own members to the position, Charles McDonald. This remained the shortest tenure for a Speaker until Ian Sinclair's term of 180 days in 1998. Salmon attempted to transfer to the Senate in 1913 after his seat's abolition, but was defeated; he also declined preselection for the safe seat of Balaclava. In 1915, however, he won the seat of Grampians from Labor in a by-election and joined the Nationalist Party upon its formation in 1916.

=== Final years ===
Salmon's seat of Laanecoorie was abolished in a redistribution prior to the 1913 election and he unsuccessfully attempted to transfer to the Senate. He sought Liberal preselection for the seat of Balaclava at the 1914 election, but withdrew in favour of former Victorian premier William Watt. He was then re-elected to the House at the 1915 Grampians by-election, "but he was never again seriously considered for the Speakership".

== Australian Natives' Association ==
Charles Carty Salmon joined the South Yarra branch of the Australian Natives' Association ANA in 1894, and was immediately elevated to the board of directors. He was elected Chief President in 1898.

Punch magazine commented cynically that Carty Salmon also aligned himself with the 'rising young men' in the House who were 'using the Australian Natives Association as a ladder to climb on'. He joined the association in 1894, and his 'pleasant drawing-room manner of speaking' soon made him 'a leading figure in the councils of the A.N.A.' Punch also noted that his election in 1898 as chief president of the ANA was 'great luck for Carty'. 'That year was the year of the referendum over Federation, and he was able to achieve a great reputation as a Federalist through the efforts of the association over which he presided'. A close examination of Carty Salmon's record as chief president does not disprove this judgement.

== Freemason ==
Salmon was a freemason and from 1914 was the grand master of the Grand Lodge of Victoria. He was also a lieutenant-colonel in the Australian Army Medical Corps and commanded a base hospital in Melbourne in 1914. He died on 15 September 1917 at his home in South Yarra and was buried with Masonic rites and full military honours. His eulogy was delivered by Lowther Clarke, Archbishop of Melbourne, and both Prime Minister Billy Hughes and Leader of the Opposition Matthew Charlton attended his funeral.

== Personal life ==
In 1900, Salmon married Nancy Harris, the daughter of Sydney mayor Matthew Harris. The couple had three sons.

Salmon collapsed at his office three days after winning re-election at the 1917 election. He died of a cerebral tumour at his home on South Yarra on 15 September 1917, aged 57.

Victorian Legislative Assembly
Preceded by Robert Bowman	Member for Talbot and Avoca; 1894–1901	Succeeded by George Mitchell
Parliament of Australia
Preceded by Frederick Holder	Speaker of the Australian House of Representatives; 1909–1910	Succeeded by Charles McDonald
Division created	Member for Laanecoorie; 1901–1913	Division abolished
Preceded by Edward Jolley	Member for Grampians; 1915–1917	Succeeded by Edmund Jowett
Masonic offices
Preceded by Reverend Albert Holden	Grand Master of the United Grand Lodge of Victoria; 1914–1918	Succeeded by Fredrick Hickford
