= Division of Grampians =

Former Australian federal electoral division

Grampians Australian House of Representatives Division
- Created: 1901
- Abolished: 1922
- Namesake: Grampian Ranges

The Division of Grampians was an Australian Electoral Division in Victoria. It was named for the Grampian Ranges in central Victoria, and included the towns of Daylesford, Maryborough, St Arnaud and Stawell. It was a marginal seat.

The division was created in 1900 and was one of the original 75 divisions contested at the first federal election. In 1913, it gained areas from the abolished divisions of Mernda (Kyneton and Woodend) and Laanecoorie (Maryborough and Daylesford). It was abolished in 1922.

== Members ==
Image	Member	Party	Term	Notes
	Thomas Skene (1845–1910)	Free Trade	29 March 1901 – 1906	Did not contest in 1906. Failed to win a Senate seat
	Thomas Skene (1845–1910)	Anti-Socialist	1906 – 8 November 1906	Did not contest in 1906. Failed to win a Senate seat
	Hans Irvine (1856–1922)	Anti-Socialist	12 December 1906 – 26 May 1909	Previously a member of the Victorian Legislative Council. Lost seat
	Hans Irvine (1856–1922)	Liberal	26 May 1909 – 5 September 1914	Previously a member of the Victorian Legislative Council. Lost seat
	Edward Jolley (1874–1915)	Labor	5 September 1914 – 1 January 1915	Died in office
	Carty Salmon (1860–1917)	Liberal	20 February 1915 – 17 February 1917	Previously held the Division of Laanecoorie. Died in office
	Carty Salmon (1860–1917)	Nationalist	17 February 1917 – 15 September 1917	Previously held the Division of Laanecoorie. Died in office
	Edmund Jowett (1858–1936)	Nationalist	27 October 1917 – 1919	Failed to win the Division of Bendigo after Grampians was abolished in 1922
	Edmund Jowett (1858–1936)	Victorian Farmers' Union	1919 – 22 January 1920	Failed to win the Division of Bendigo after Grampians was abolished in 1922
	Edmund Jowett (1858–1936)	Country	22 January 1920 – 16 December 1922	Failed to win the Division of Bendigo after Grampians was abolished in 1922
