= Electoral results for the district of Ballarat West =

Electoral results for Ballarat West, Victoria, Australia

This is a list of electoral results for the electoral district of Ballarat West in Victorian state elections.

== Members for Ballarat West ==
First incarnation (1859–1904)
Member	Party	Term
John Bailey	Unaligned	1859–1861
Robert Serjeant	Unaligned	1859–1861
Duncan Gillies	Unaligned	1861–1868
William Collard Smith	Unaligned	1861–1864
Robert Lewis	Unaligned	1864
William Vale	Unaligned	1864–65, 1865–69
Charles Jones	Unaligned	1868–69, 1869, 1869–71
John James	Unaligned	1869–1870
Sir Archibald Michie	Unaligned	1870–1871
Joseph Jones	Unaligned	1871–1875
William Collard Smith	Unaligned	1871–1892
George Fincham	Unaligned	1875–1886
Henry Bell	Unaligned	1877–1886
Charles Jones	Unaligned	1886–1889
Richard Vale	Unaligned	1886–1889
Joseph Kirton	Unaligned	1889–1894
Richard Vale	Unaligned	1892–1902
William Collard Smith	Unaligned	1894
Joseph Kirton	Unaligned	1894–1904
Richard Vale	Unaligned	1892–1902
Charles Shoppee	Ministerialist	1902–1904
Second incarnation (1904–1927)
Member	Party	Term
Harry Bennett	Labor	1904–1907
Joseph Kirton	Unaligned	1907–1908
Andrew McKissock	Labor	1908–1911
Matthew Baird	Commonwealth Liberal	1911–1917
Matthew Baird	Economy	1917–1918
Matthew Baird	Nationalist	1918–1927
Third incarnation (1992–2014)
Member	Party	Term
Paul Jenkins	Liberal	1992–1999
Karen Overington	Labor	1999–2010
Sharon Knight	Labor	2010–2014

== Election results ==
=== Elections in the 2010s ===
2010 Victorian state election: Ballarat West
Party	Candidate	Votes	%	±%
Liberal	Craig Coltman	17,230	43.60	+5.66
Labor	Sharon Knight	16,446	41.62	−5.49
Greens	Leon Dwyer	3,876	9.81	−0.08
Family First	Dale Butterfield	1,284	3.25	−1.78
Country Alliance	Carl Wesley	681	1.72	+1.72
Total formal votes		39,517	95.78	−0.56
Informal votes		1,740	4.22	+0.56
Turnout		41,257	93.84	+1.55
Two-party-preferred result
Labor	Sharon Knight	20,175	51.05	−5.55
Liberal	Craig Coltman	19,342	48.95	+5.55
Labor hold		Swing	−5.55	

=== Elections in the 2000s ===
2006 Victorian state election: Ballarat West
Party	Candidate	Votes	%	±%
Labor	Karen Overington	17,292	47.11	−5.33
Liberal	Shane Brennan	13,934	37.96	+1.23
Greens	Belinda Coates	3,631	9.89	+2.93
Family First	Dale Butterfield	1,847	5.03	+5.03
Total formal votes		36,704	96.34	−1.19
Informal votes		1,395	3.66	+1.19
Turnout		38,099	92.29	−2.34
Two-party-preferred result
Labor	Karen Overington	20,761	56.56	−2.44
Liberal	Shane Brennan	15,948	43.44	+2.44
Labor hold		Swing	−2.44	

2002 Victorian state election: Ballarat West
Party	Candidate	Votes	%	±%
Labor	Karen Overington	19,221	52.44	+1.43
Liberal	Judy Verlin	13,461	36.73	−12.26
Greens	Faye Backstrom	2,552	6.96	+6.96
Independent	Geoff Sullivan	912	2.49	+2.49
Christian Democrats	Rob Donker	507	1.38	+1.38
Total formal votes		36,653	97.53	−0.08
Informal votes		929	2.47	+0.08
Turnout		37,582	94.63	−0.17
Two-party-preferred result
Labor	Karen Overington	21,625	59.00	+7.99
Liberal	Judy Verlin	15,027	41.00	−7.99
Labor hold		Swing	+7.99	

=== Elections in the 1990s ===
1999 Victorian state election: Ballarat West
Party	Candidate	Votes	%	±%
Labor	Karen Overington	15,527	51.0	+2.4
Liberal	Judy Verlin	14,910	49.0	−2.4
Total formal votes		30,437	97.6	−0.6
Informal votes		744	2.4	+0.6
Turnout		31,181	94.8	
Labor gain from Liberal		Swing	+2.4	

1996 Victorian state election: Ballarat West
Party	Candidate	Votes	%	±%
Liberal	Paul Jenkins	14,706	49.5	+0.7
Labor	Robyn Mason	13,623	45.8	+3.6
Call to Australia	Jodie Rickard	871	2.9	+2.9
Natural Law	Peter Smith	530	1.8	+1.8
Total formal votes		29,730	98.2	+1.0
Informal votes		550	1.8	−1.0
Turnout		30,280	94.9	
Two-party-preferred result
Liberal	Paul Jenkins	15,265	51.4	−1.3
Labor	Robyn Mason	14,446	48.6	+1.3
Liberal hold		Swing	−1.3	

1992 Victorian state election: Ballarat West
Party	Candidate	Votes	%	±%
Liberal	Paul Jenkins	14,091	48.8	+2.9
Labor	Karen Overington	12,204	42.3	−3.4
Independent	Joan Chambers	1,456	5.0	+5.0
Independent	David White	721	2.5	+2.5
Independent	Noel Vodden	410	1.4	+1.4
Total formal votes		28,882	97.2	−0.9
Informal votes		833	2.8	+0.9
Turnout		29,715	96.6	
Two-party-preferred result
Liberal	Paul Jenkins	15,210	52.7	+1.0
Labor	Karen Overington	13,640	47.3	−1.0
Liberal hold		Swing	+1.0	

=== Elections in the 1920s ===
1924 Victorian state election: Ballarat West
Party	Candidate	Votes	%	±%
Nationalist	Matthew Baird	4,286	57.5	−9.7
Labor	Mark Lazarus	3,163	42.5	+9.7
Total formal votes		7,449	99.4	−0.2
Informal votes		42	0.6	+0.2
Turnout		7,491	75.1	+7.7
Nationalist hold		Swing	−9.7	

1921 Victorian state election: Ballarat West
Party	Candidate	Votes	%	±%
Nationalist	Matthew Baird	4,622	67.2	+9.7
Labor	Thomas Wilson	2,255	32.8	+32.8
Total formal votes		6,877	99.7	+0.4
Informal votes		23	0.3	−0.4
Turnout		6,900	67.4	−8.9
Nationalist hold		Swing	N/A	

1920 Victorian state election: Ballarat West
Party	Candidate	Votes	%	±%
Nationalist	Matthew Baird	4,567	57.5	
Independent	Charles Brind	3,372	42.5	+42.5
Total formal votes		7,939	99.3	
Informal votes		59	0.7	
Turnout		7,998	76.3	
Nationalist hold		Swing	N/A	

=== Elections in the 1910s ===
1917 Victorian state election: Ballarat West
Party	Candidate	Votes	%	±%
Nationalist	Matthew Baird	unopposed		
Nationalist hold		Swing		

1914 Victorian state election: Ballarat West
Party	Candidate	Votes	%	±%
Liberal	Matthew Baird	4,390	61.3	+4.7
Labor	Thomas Richards	2,765	38.6	−4.7
Total formal votes		7,155	98.6	−0.5
Informal votes		104	1.4	+0.5
Turnout		7,259	67.8	−4.0
Liberal hold		Swing	+4.7	

1911 Victorian state election: Ballarat West
Party	Candidate	Votes	%	±%
Liberal	Matthew Baird	4,100	56.6	+8.3
Labor	Andrew McKissock	3,146	43.4	−8.3
Total formal votes		7,246	99.1	−0.7
Informal votes		64	0.9	+0.7
Turnout		7,310	71.8	+13.6
Liberal gain from Labor		Swing	+8.3	
