= David John Wheal =

Australian Indigenous leader

- Born: 1851; Sandhurst, Victoria, Australia
- Died: May 1904 (aged 52–53)
- Occupation(s): Salesman, footwear manufacturer
- Partner: Pamela Were 1954–1918
- Children: 2
- Parent(s): David Wheal and Margaret MacDonald.

David John Wheal was a bootmaker, salesman, businessman and a chief president of the Australian Natives' Association.

== Background ==
David Wheal was born in Adelaide in 1851, the only son of David Wheal and Margaret MacDonald. On 2 May 1877 he married Pamela Were in the Lydiard Street Wesleyan Church. In his youth he seems to have been apprenticed as a bootmaker.

== Community ==
By 1888 he was the head of a substantial business in Ballarat, a ‘wholesale and retail boot and shoe manufacturer and importer’ located at 80 Bridge Street, Ballarat. His public activities were focussed through the ANA. His obituary notes that he was a man of ‘intense religious fervour’, but he believed that religion should be a private matter. He was ‘a fluent speaker’, but no orator; he persuaded his hearers by the strength of his conviction. He was several times invited to stand for Parliament, but always declined, preferring to work in support of other Liberal candidates.

Wheal was a member of the Lydiard Street Methodist Church and a teacher at their Sunday School. He was a founding member of the committee and also provided financial support to the City Wesley Junior Cricket Club and was on the committee of the seniors club. In the winter sports season he was on the committee of the City Wesley Football Club.

He was active in the community and petitioned a candidate to stand for council through a paid advertisement. Participating in community events, such as the formal presentation of an award for bravery to Mr M J Carmody for his demonstration of bravery in the disastrous flooding of the No. 2 Australasian Mine on 12 December 1882, and other public speaking events.

In the 1880s and 1890s, Wheal was a member of Joseph Kirton's electoral committee and attended and participated in many of Kirton's public meetings in support of the election campaigns.

== Australian Natives' Association ==
Wheal was one of the earliest members of the Ballarat Branch of The Australian Natives' Association. His speech in Geelong at a public meeting to consider forming a Geelong Branch of the ANA he spoke of the ANA's positive financial performance. Then in support of the broad national agenda of the ANA he said: "They were not a political organisation; such combinations had been tried, and had failed. They were national in their objects and aims: they desired federation, the stoppage of French recidivists transportation to the Pacific islands, and British protection for all islands in proximity to Australia."

He served earnestly in most roles in the branch. At the 1885-6 Annual Conference he was elected to the board of directors. This was a time when there was much discussion within the ANA about the extent of policy discussion and attempts to limit both the extent of political discussion and members use of the association to further their own political aims. Success in saving the park Russel Square in Ballarat from being used as a foundry. He was elected vice president in 1887. He stood for Chief President in 1889 but was defeated by James Liddell Purves who served for two terms. He was elected unopposed in 1890 becoming the 10th Chief President of the organisation.

Debates where a popular part of community life at both the ANA and the Lydiard Street Mutual Improvement Association.(Wesleyan) and Wheal was a frequent and competent participant.

His vision for the association was a generous one. "There had been a great deal of religious intolerance in the old land, and they were trying to get rid of the narrow sectarianism of the past, to do away with it wherever it separated man from man, and offended humanity. They did not want that sort of thing to exist in Australia, and as a society, he believed they were sowing the seeds of political and social freedom."

Wheal was an active participant and speaker at events organised by the ANA. He was an energetic speaker at the public meeting the ANA held and in debates.

ANA local debates and annual conference resolutions were instrumental in significantly influencing the development of Australian society and political form while remaining non-political and non-sectarian. Wheal was an early and important part of this process.

During Wheal's time on the board and as vice and chief president, many branches moved motions and promoted the idea of nativism. From 1886 the designation corroboree began to appear in Branch Records for gatherings or meetings, the recognition of Adam Lindsay Gordon was promoted as our Australian Poet, and the promotion of Australian history was promoted in Victorian school books.

The ANA Intercolonial Federation Conference was held in Melbourne on 22 January 1890, with Wheal one of the Victorian delegates and as vice president. This Conference brought together ANA representatives from each state and building on Henry Parkes 1899 Tenterfield Oration initiated progress towards an Australian Federation. Many of the motions passed at this conference were adopted by the Colonies Premier's Conference of 1991.

== Later years ==
Wheal died in 1903, aged only 53 with health issues over two years with a sudden decline in his last week. He was survived by his wife and two sons. One of his sons was in the boot trade and both were members of the South Street Society debates and recitations. His obituary in the Advance Australia remembered him as ‘one of that band of honest, plodding, patriotic men who laid the foundations of the Australian Natives’ Association’.
