= Walter Skelton (Victoria) =

Australian accountant (1864–1929)

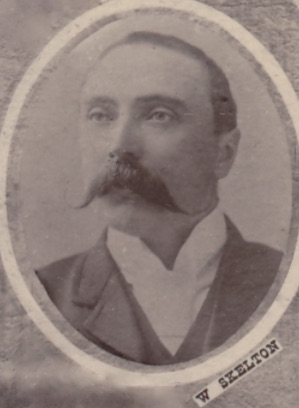
- Walter_Skelton (ANA Chief President)
- Born: 1864; Scarsdale
- Died: 11 May 1929 (aged 65); Bendigo Cemetery, Victoria
- Burial place: Bendigo Victoria
- Occupations: Draper and Tailor
- Partner: Marie Riedle
- Children: August Vaughan 1886 Alice Victoria 1888 Arthur Philip 1889 Xavier 1891 Henrietta Cecily 1896
- Parent(s): John Cahill and Mary Deehan

Walter Skelton (February 1864 – May 1929) was an accountant, businessman, draper, Magistrate, breeder of fine poultry, and Chief President of the Australian Natives' Association (ANA).

== Early years ==
Walter Skelton was born in Scarsdale, Victoria, on 5 February 1864, the son of Walter Skelton and Maria Moyle. His parents were sufficiently prosperous to educate him at Wesley College in Melbourne. In 1883 his father, also a draper, died in Dunolly. In 1885 he tendered for a new house to be built. On 11 March 1887 at Collingwood he married Grace Elizabeth Threlkeld in her parents' house. Their son, Walter, was born in 1888 and passed away within 5 month. Then in 1890 they had a daughter, Ida Frances, who lived a full life.

== Business ==
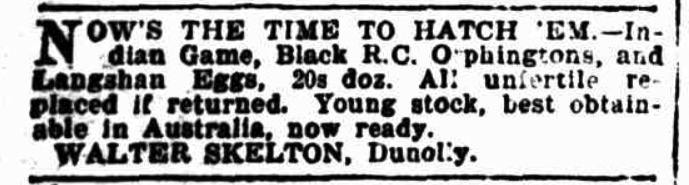
Walter Skelton Poultry - Dunolly - Advertisement 1900

Skelton was an accountant and also a businessman; in 1900 the Weekly Times reported that ‘At Dunolly he carries on business as a merchant, and is a leading public man’. He ran one of the drapery businesses in Dunolly until 1910 when he offered it for sale by tender.

He was a breeder of fine poultry ‘who delights in the feather hobby’ – Indian Game, Black Orpingtons and Langshams. Over the first decade of the 20th century Skelton entered many poultry competitions and either won his class or was well placed nearly every year from 1902 to 1910. While he delighted in the hobby, it was also a business as he sold poultry and fertilised eggs. The eggs had a warranty on their fertility or immediate replacement.

Skelton invented and applied for a patented on an improved combination water tank and cool chamber in 1896. In 1900 his solicitor wrote to the Herald newspaper in Melbourne requesting publication of the letter to clarify to the public his patent another claimed inventor. The letter advises that Skeltons invention had previously been published in "The Scientific Australian".

== Community ==
Skelton was appointed a lieutenant in the Victorian Rangers, the Colony of Victoria's volunteer infantry in November 1889.

He was a member of the Dunolly Borough Council, being first elected unopposed in an extraordinary election in 1894. While 1900 was the third year in succession he was elected Mayor of the borough of Dunolly.

Skelton was a Justice of the Peace (JP). On 16 October 1901 he was appointed a magistrate, ‘to keep the peace in the Midland Bailiwick of Victoria’.

== Australian Natives' Association ==
Skelton was a founding member and the first Vice President of the Dunolly ANA Branch No. 33 in June 1885. Dunolly was one of the flourishing gold fields towns where there was a rich source of members needing the support of a Friendly Society such as the ANA. The branch grew steadily while the gold held out. Skelton attended his first annual ANA conference in 1886 and was a regular attendee thereafter. At the 1900 conference he was elected Chief President after a strong challenge from James Liddell Purves a previous Chief President and a capable and charismatic speaker.

Skelton was the board of directors’ candidate for the presidency at the 1900 ANA annual conference in Geelong. He was opposed by Purves, who had the backing of a number of metropolitan branches. Skelton was ‘not one of the orators of the association’, rather a hard worker on its behalf. He defeated Purves soundly, probably because it was widely believed that Purves was intending to use the ANA to enter federal politics. Skelton's presidency was not marked by controversy or rancorous debate.

His election as Chief President also meant he was to host the 1900 Intercolonial Conference of ANA. He also saw the culmination of almost 20 years of work by the ANA to bring about the federation of the six Australian Colonies into the Commonwealth of Australia. Skelton was the head of a maturing organisation that now had an average membership age of nearly 30 years. This is 10 years older than it was in the 1880s, it was also something that would keep growing.

Skelton was also involved in the opening of the Carngham ANA Branch No. 198 opened in 1900.

In appreciation of his services Skelton was presented with a gold medal studded with six diamonds stars.

In his address to the 1901 ANA Conference Skelton made the following points:

- Referring to the death of Queen Victoria he said few received affection from world as she had;
- Referring to the planned interstate conference of ANA boards of directors he urged:
  - Federating the Australian Natives’ Association;
  - Subscriptions for members serving in the South African conflict he said treat it in a business like manner rather than a sentimental spirit;
- Commended the principles of the old age pension;
- Recognised the achievement of federation of the Australian Colonies;
- Challenged members to study the great national questions;
- observed that the ANA had been called a nursery for politicians while the ANA is apolitical and non religious and that politicians in its ranks represented all shades of opinion.

== Later years ==
Skelton died in Essendon on 11 May 1929.
