= Edward Elliott Roberts =

Australian clerk and politician (1863–1950)

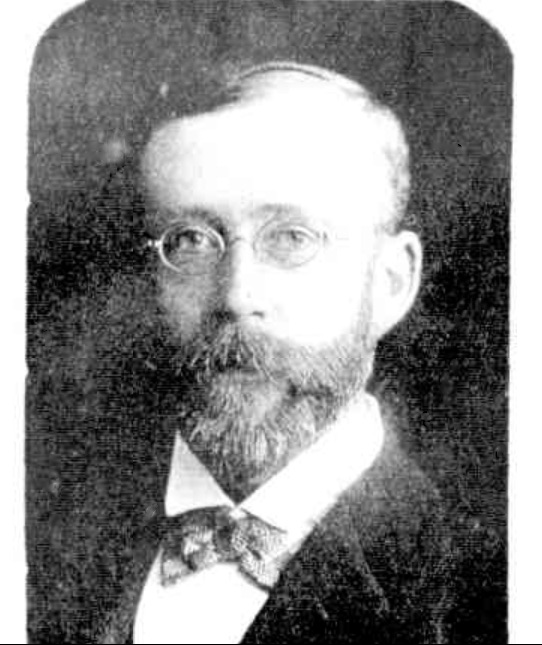
- Born: 1863; Newham, Victoria, Australia
- Died: September 1950 (aged 86–87); Moonee Ponds, Victoria, Australia
- Occupations: Clerk, administrator, politician
- Partner: Sarah Dean
- Children: Several

Edward Elliott Roberts (1863 – September 1950) was a clerk, administrator, politician and a Chief President of the Australian Natives' Association (ANA).

== Background ==
Robert was born at Newham, near Woodend, and spent his youth in the country. He moved to Melbourne at the age of 23.

Roberts married Sarah Dean in 1888, and that they had several children. He worked as a clerk in the Government Statists Office.

== Politics ==
Roberts was a councillor and Mayor of Essendon.

He was also one of the strong proponents of Federation of the Australian colonies working closely with Isaacs, Peacock, Deakin and Salmon in pursuing the success of the two public votes leading to the formation of the Commonwealth of Australia. In 1901 when Alfred Deakin formed his electoral organisation, the National Liberal Organisation, Roberts was one of the executive vice-presidents.

In 1902 he contested the Victorian seat of Kilmore as candidate for the Irvine government, and was defeated. In the years that followed he stood for a series of state and federal seats, always unsuccessfully. For example, he nominated for the federal seat of Balaclava in 1906 in support of the Protectionist Party and polled poorly in last place of the four candidates. See Electoral results for the Division of Balaclava.

Roberts described himself as a Liberal, but his opinions tended to the conservative side of politics.

Roberts was also the General Secretary of the Victorian Farmers' Union Country Party.

== Australian Natives' Association ==
Within the ANA Roberts seems to have been valued more for his business acumen than his oratory. Members of the Flemington branch praised him for his ‘painstaking qualities’, and Alexander Peacock, welcoming Roberts to the presidency, said that his election was ‘the reward of consistent and hard work in lodge and on the board of directors’. He was also regarded as ‘an authority on Friendly Society law. Notwithstanding, at times his speeches were described as ‘stirring’ and ‘spirited’.

Roberts described himself as a Liberal, but his opinions tended to the conservative side of politics. He spoke strongly against the involvement of the ANA in party politics, and as president was quick to commit the association to support for Australia's involvement in the Boer War. A paper that he read to the North Melbourne branch of the association on ‘The Discontent of the Working Classes’ came in for ‘severe criticism’ from radical members of the branch.

In 1898 he travelled to Mildura via train to Swan Hill and then in a horse-drawn coach for the last 100 miles (160 kilometres) for the opening of the Mildura ANA Branch No 171.

Roberts, was secretary and long-term member of the Flemington branch of the ANA, and was elected to the position of Chief President of the association in March 1899. During his time as Chief President, 11 new ANA branches were opened, higher than previous average rate. The decision to facilitate the creation of the Australasian Women's Association was made during Roberts stuardship after two previous failed attempts. In this role Roberts went to Tasmania with the General Secretary F. C. Wainwright and opened branches in Launceston and Deloraine. As Chief President, Roberts was involved in the ANA supporting the Australian Federation League in promoting a positive vote for the formation of the Commonwealth of Australia. ANA branches in effectively remained local agents of the league with support of Roberts and the Board.

Robert was also on the ANA Auditor committee.

== Employment ==
Roberts initially worked as a clerk in the Government Statists Office. In 1901 he resigned from the Government Statists Office to take up the position of Melbourne manager of the Independent Order of Odd Fellows (IOOF).

== Community ==
Roberts is a prominent sculler, having won trophies in matches, pulling with Civil Service and Maribyrnong crews.

He was also a patron of the Australian Literature Society.

== Later years ==
Roberts died in September 1950 at his home in Moonee Ponds aged 87.
