= List of chief presidents of the Australian Natives' Association =

The Australian Natives' Association (ANA) was a mutual society founded in Melbourne, Australia in April 1871. From 1877, the ANA elected a Chief President at their Annual Conference held at different cities each year. The ANA ceased having a Chief President in 1993, following their merger of certain operations with Manchester Unity IOOF of Victoria to create Australian Unity.

== Chief presidents ==
Year	Name	Portrait	Branch elected from	Conference elected at	Additional information
1877-78	Thomas O'Callaghan		Sandhurst	Melbourne	First Conference held on Melbourne Cup Day, 9 November 1877. O’Callaghan took a conservative view of the proper function of the ANA. He believed that as a benefit society it should have nothing to do with matters that might be considered political.
1879-80	Simon Cadden		Ballarat	Melbourne	The ninth branch of the ANA was formed in Charters Towers, Queensland, in 1879.
1881	Malachi James Cahill		Sandhurst	Ballarat	The 1881 Census showed for the first time that the Australian born were for the first time in a majority, with 59% of the population. Cahill first proposes the precursor to Australia Day in 1884.
1882	William Anderson		Creswick	Melbourne	Anderson was active in promoting new branches, achieving five new branches in 1882 when Chief President.
1883	Richard Henry Hart		Stawell	Stawell	When Hart was Chief President membership of the ANA grew by 40%.
1884	Osbert Edrick Wilson		Horsham	Creswick	Wilson chaired the first public meeting run by the ANA in support of Federation of the Australian colonies and other national issues.
1885-1886	Alexander Peacock		Creswick	Bendigo & Melbourne	Peacock was always an active office holder in the association, expanding its membership and branches in the 1880s, and leading it into an increasingly public role in the 1890s, especially in area of Federation.
1887	Thomas Jefferson Connelly		Sandhurst	Ballarat	Connelly was the founding editor of the second ANA journal, The National Australian. He also travelled to South Australia to form the ANA there.
1888-89	James Liddell Purves		Melbourne	Geelong & Bendigo	While his speeches alienated some, association grew in members and branches under his leadership, and his oratory aroused in its members a strong sense of responsibility for their country's future.
1890	David John Wheal		Ballarat	Maryborough	The ANA Intercolonial Federation Conference held in Melbourne on 22 January 1890, with Wheal one of the Victorian delegates and as vice president.
1891	George Wise		Sale	Ararat	Wise worked to federate Australia on a democratic basis. He was a trustee of the Association for 53 years.
1892	John William Larter		Ballarat East	Sale	ANA reaches 10,000 members.
1893	Alexander Peacock		Creswick	Kyneton	His third term as Chief President.
1894	George Fitzsimmons		Prahran	Warrnambool	The 1894 ANA Warrnambool Conference passed a series of radical motions adopting as ANA ‘planks’ a tax on the unimproved value of land, a minimum wage for workers in public utilities, and full adult suffrage.
1895	Joseph Kirton		Ballarat	Melbourne	
1896	James Hume Cook		Brunswick	Daylesford	
1897	Richard Toutcher		Richmond	Castlemaine	
1898	Carty Salmon		Avoca	Bendigo	
1899	Edward Elliott Roberts		Flemington	Port Fairy	
1900	Walter Skelton		Dunnolly	Geelong	
1901	Thomas Crosbie		North Melbourne	Beechworth	
1902	T. M. Burke		Ararat	Ballarat	
1903	Arthur Robinson		Malvern	Daylesford	
1904	J. M. A. Callaghan		Coburg	Bairnsdale	
1905	T. Glass		Sandhurst	Queenscliff	
1906	A. D. Freeman		Castlemaine	Shepparton	
1907	A. J. O’Dwyer		Echuca	Hamilton	
1908	A. G. Proudfoot		Hawthorn	Maryborough	
1909	A. A. Peverill		South Melbourne	Geelong	
1910	E. D. Wilcox		Geelong	Echuca	
1911	John Lemmon		Williamstown	Warrnambool	
1912	William Francis McNamara		Rushworth	Castlemaine	
1913	Morris Mondle Phillips		Malvern	Ararat	
1914	A. M. Taylor		Ballarat	Wangaratta	
1915	J. H. Hewison		Carlton	Port Fairy	
1916	A. C. Ostrom		Echuca	Warragul	
1917	M. Davine		Warragul	Kerang	
1918	C. A. Hack		Collingwood	Bendigo	
1919	G. D. McLean		Castlemaine	Horsham	
1920	G. Allen Moir		Albert Park	Sale	
1921	Thos Rust		Hawthorn	Colac	
1922	E. J. L. Bremner		Toora	Mildura	
1923	Albert Bussau		Hopetoun	Bairnsdale	
1924	V. L. Ginn		Malvern	Warrnambool	
1925	J. Patterson		Mildura	Ballarat	
1926	Bill Slater		Hamilton	Sorrento	
1927	J. Green		Mirboo North	Hamilton	
1928	A. Staples		Bendigo	Swan Hill	
1929	A. G. Byrne		South Yarra	Healesville	
1930	J. Howlett Ross		Fitzroy	Echuca	
1931	D. Black		Sunshine	Warrnambool	
1932	J. M. Elliot		Ballarat East	Bendigo	
1933	R. C. Ritchie		Murrumbeena	Mornington	
1934	Harry Drew		Middle Park	Mildura	
1935	P. J. Toohey		Warracknabeal	Queenscliff	
1936	G. F. Holland		Albert Park	Castlemaine	
1937	J. W. Marrows		Merbein	Warragul	
1938	S. J. Herron		Prahran	Sorrento	
1939	J. B. Dwyer		Warrnambool	Warrnambool	
1940	H. G. Hughes		Geelong West	Cowes	
1941-42	J. E. Menadue		Horsham	Sorrento	Served for two years as a result of the Second World War
1943	Dr. A. R. Haywood		Hastings	Melbourne	
1944-45	H. B. V. Dimelow		Fitzroy	Melbourne	Served for two years as a result of the Second World War
1946	P. J. Lynch CBE		Murrumbeena	Melbourne	
1947	Bill Fulton		Maffra	Geelong	
1948	R. J. Joseph		St Kilda	Ballarat	
1949	A. Shaw		Moyston	Bendigo	
1950	W. G. Smallman		Footscray West	Sorrento	
1951	A. R. Milne		Tatura	Bendigo	
1952	J. E. Kellway		Elsternwick	Ballarat	
1953	C. W. Quihampton		Fitzroy	Queenscliff	
1954	V. G. Wright		Bentleigh	Daylesford	
1955	J. A. Donald		Camberwell	Mildura	
1956	G. A. Abberton		Williamstown	Sorrento	
1957	G. Briggs		Burwood	Lorne	
1958	Arthur Smith		Seymour	Lorne	
1959	T. R. Davey		Balwyn & Deepdene	Lakes Entrance	
1960	E. W. Pitts		Newport	Ballarat	
1961	H. J. Peagram		South Yarra	Daylesford	
1962	H. T. Shannon		Box Hill	Warrnambool	
1963	K. E. Rash		Ballarat	Wangaratta	
1964	J. A. S Geddes		Creswick	Lorne	Amalgamated with the Australasian Women's Association
1965	C. D. D. Martin		Glen Iris	Sorrento	
1966	D. C. T. Robertson		Camberwell	Lorne	
1967	J. E. Menadue		Black Rock	Wodonga	Second term as Chief President
1968	H. A. Patterson		Learmonth	Mildura	
1969	F. E. Capuano		Essendon North	Yarrawonga	
1970	W. . Foley		Ballarat	Lakes Entrance	
1971	A. J. Brisbane		Wangaratta	Wangaratta	
1972	H. T. Murley		Bendigo	Swan Hill	
1973	B. J. Kelleher		Chadstone	Sale	
1974	J. A. S Geddes		Creswick	Horsham	Second term as Chief President
1975	L. J. Yelland		Elsternwick	Shepparton	
1976	F. E. Capuano		Essendon North	Wodonga	Second term as Chief President
1977	Mrs. I. V. Meagher		Fairfield & Alphington	Portland	The first Female Chief President, previously a member of AWA.
1978	H. J. Peagram		South Yarra	Bairnsdale	
1979	W. A. Cuddihy		Elsternwick	Wangaratta	
1980	R. A. Storey AIHIA		Bendigo	Bendigo	
1981	W. L. J. Crofts		Altona	Hamilton	
1982	E. S. A. Wickham		Hawthorn	Ballarat	
1983	Mrs. S. V. Wright		Rosebud	Horsham	
1984	B. W. Armstrong		Glen Iris	Yarrawonga	
1985	W. L. J. Cook		Geelong	Geelong	
1986	G. D. Wearne		Newington	Sale	
1987	J. H. Dean		Bendigo	Warrnambool	
1988	W. R. Jewell		Box Hill	Swan Hill	
1989	T. A. Byrne		Yarraville	Bendigo	Agreement to merge ANA with the Manchester Unity IOOF Friendly Society to create Australia Unity.
1990	Alan Yawkins		Ballarat		
1990	Leon Hickey		Central		Merger of ANA with the Manchester Unity to create Australia Unity was completed.

== Sources ==
- Aveling, M. (1970). A History of the Australian Natives Association 1871-1900, Melbourne: Department of History, Monash University - Thesis.
- Menadue, J. E. (1971) A Centenary History of The Australian Natives Association 1871 - 1971, Horticultural Press: Melbourne.
