= John Quick (politician) =

Australian politician (1852–1932)

The Honourable Sir John Quick
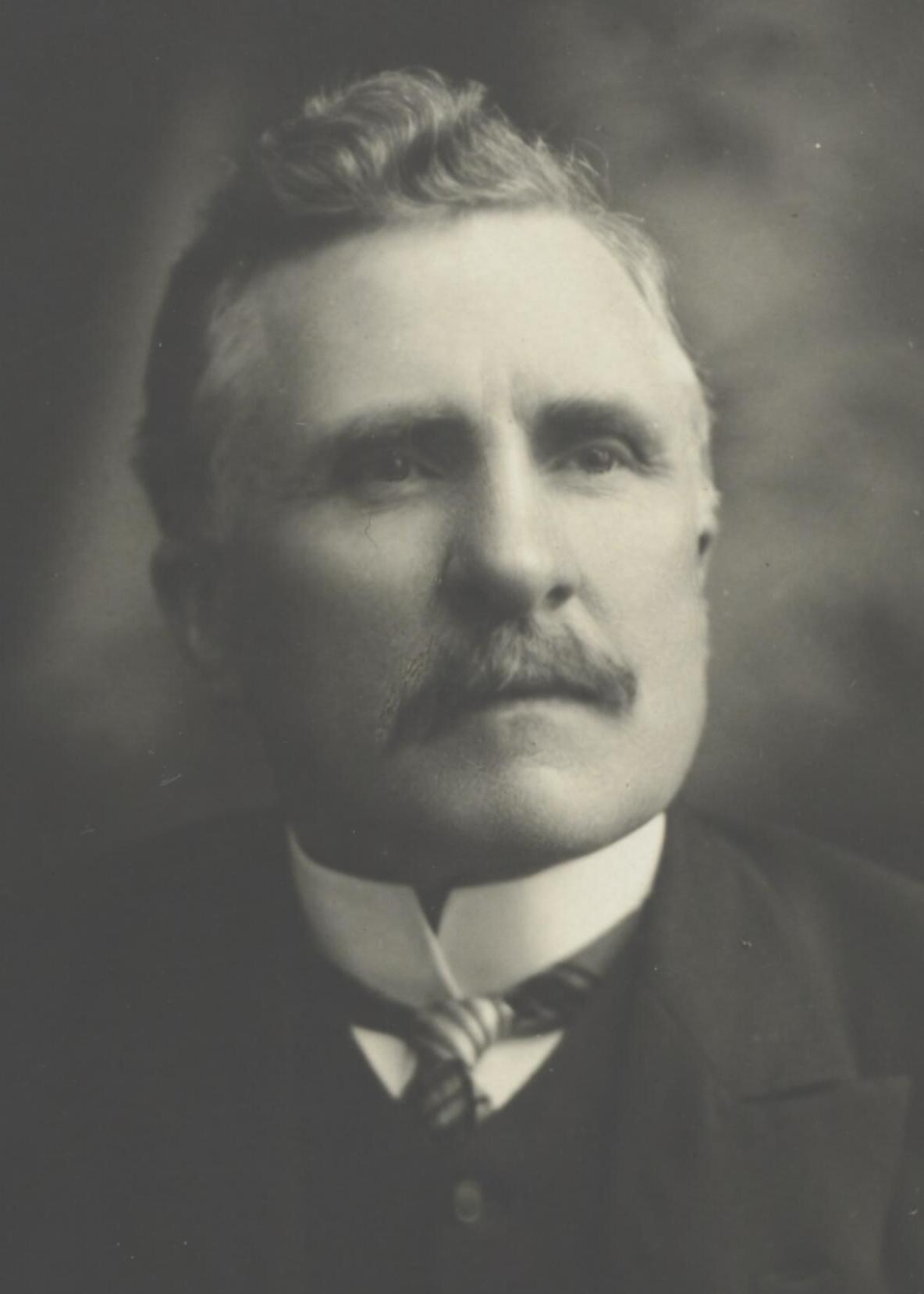

Postmaster-General of Australia
- In office 2 June 1909 – 29 April 1910
- Prime Minister: Alfred Deakin
- Preceded by: Josiah Thomas
- Succeeded by: Josiah Thomas

Member of the Australian Parliament for Bendigo
- In office 29 March 1901 – 31 May 1913
- Preceded by: New seat
- Succeeded by: John Arthur

Personal details
- Born: 22 April 1852 Towednack, Cornwall, England
- Died: 17 June 1932 (aged 80) Melbourne, Victoria, Australia
- Party: Protectionist (1901–06); Ind Protectionist (1906–09); Liberal (1909–13)
- Spouse: Catherine Harris
- Education: University of Melbourne
- Occupation: Journalist

Sir John Quick (22 April 1852 – 17 June 1932) was an Australian lawyer, politician and judge. He played a prominent role in the movement for Federation and the drafting of the Australian constitution, later writing several works on Australian constitutional law. He began his political career in the Victorian Legislative Assembly (1880–1889) and later won election to the House of Representatives at the first federal election in 1901. He served as Postmaster-General in the third Deakin Government (1909–1910). He lost his seat in 1913 and ended his public service as deputy president of the Commonwealth Court of Conciliation and Arbitration (1922–1930).

== Early life ==
He was born in the parish of Towednack, near St Ives in Cornwall, England, the son of John Sr and Mary Quick. His life changed when he was 2 when his family migrated to Australia in 1854, where his father, a farmer, began prospecting at the Bendigo goldfields but died a few months later of a fever.

Quick worked as an assistant at the Bendigo Evening News and then as a junior reporter at the Bendigo Independent. There, he gained skills in shorthand writing and improved his general education.

In 1873, Quick moved to Melbourne, passing the University of Melbourne in 1877 with a Bachelor of Laws (LLB). Quick continued as a journalist. Soon, he became the Parliament reporter at The Age.

== Victorian politics ==
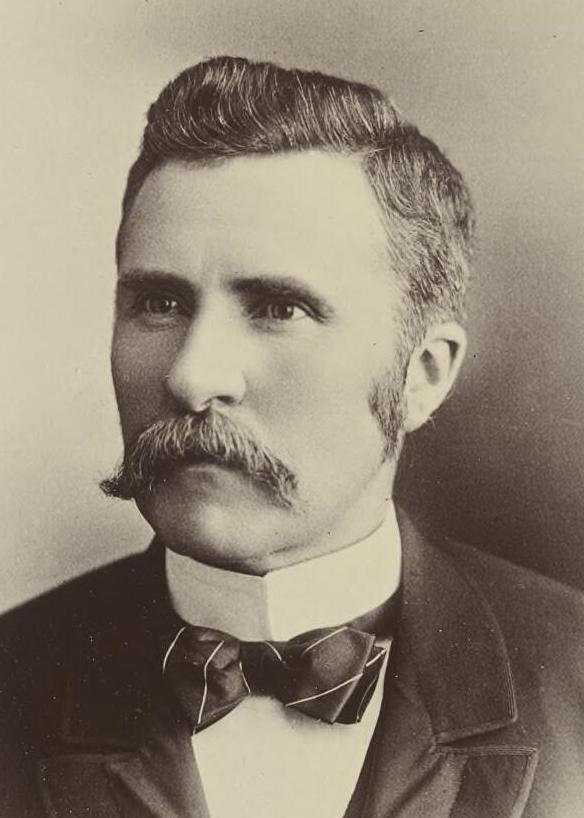
Quick at the 1898 Australian Federal Convention

In 1880 Quick was elected the Member for Sandhurst (Bendigo) in the Victorian Legislative Assembly. He was a supporter of the radical liberal leader Sir Graham Berry. He resigned from The Age and returned to live in Bendigo, where he practised as a solicitor. In 1882, Quick received a Doctor of Laws degree (LL.D) after an examination.

On 24 December 1883, he married Catherine Harris (born 26 July 1861 at Eaglehawk) the daughter of Joseph Harris and Annie Cahill. They married at St Peter's Episcopal Church, Eaglehawk. The couple did not have any children together.

Quick was successful in parliament, and in 1886 was offered a ministerial portfolio by the then Premier of Victoria Duncan Gillies. However, after an electoral redistribution, Quick lost his seat at the 1889 election.

== Federation ==
Quick had become interested in the Australian Federation movement while in the Victorian Parliament, and in the early 1890s, he successfully persuaded the Australian Natives' Association to advocate Federation.

In August 1893, Quick attended a convention of Federationists, the Corowa Conference, and there devised a scheme for the direct election of national convention, tasked to draft a federal constitution which would then be put to voter by means of a referendum. The scheme elicited little interest, and was formally rejected by Edward Barton's Australasian Federal League. But in November 1893 Quick drafted a bill encapsulating his ideas, in 1894 George Reid adopted them as Premier of New South Wales, and in 1897-8 the Australasian Federal Convention was constructed out of Quick's plan with very little modification.

In March 1897 Quick won the second of ten vacancies in Victoria's delegation to the Federal Australasian Convention, outpolling Alfred Deakin. In the Convention's proceedings, his voting pattern was characteristic of the radical strain within it, and more closely resembled that of Alfred Deakin's more than any other delegate. Nevertheless, he was personally estranged from Deakin, to his later cost.

On 1 January 1901, Quick and Robert Garran published The Annotated Constitution of the Australian Commonwealth, which is widely regarded as one of the most authoritative works on the Australian Constitution.

== Australian Natives Association ==
While Quick was not born in Australia as was required for membership of the Australian Natives' Association (ANA) he nonetheless became a member of the Sandhurst (Bendigo) branch in 1882. He was a member at the same time as Malachi Cahill. Cahill also became the chairman of his electoral committee.

== Federal politics ==
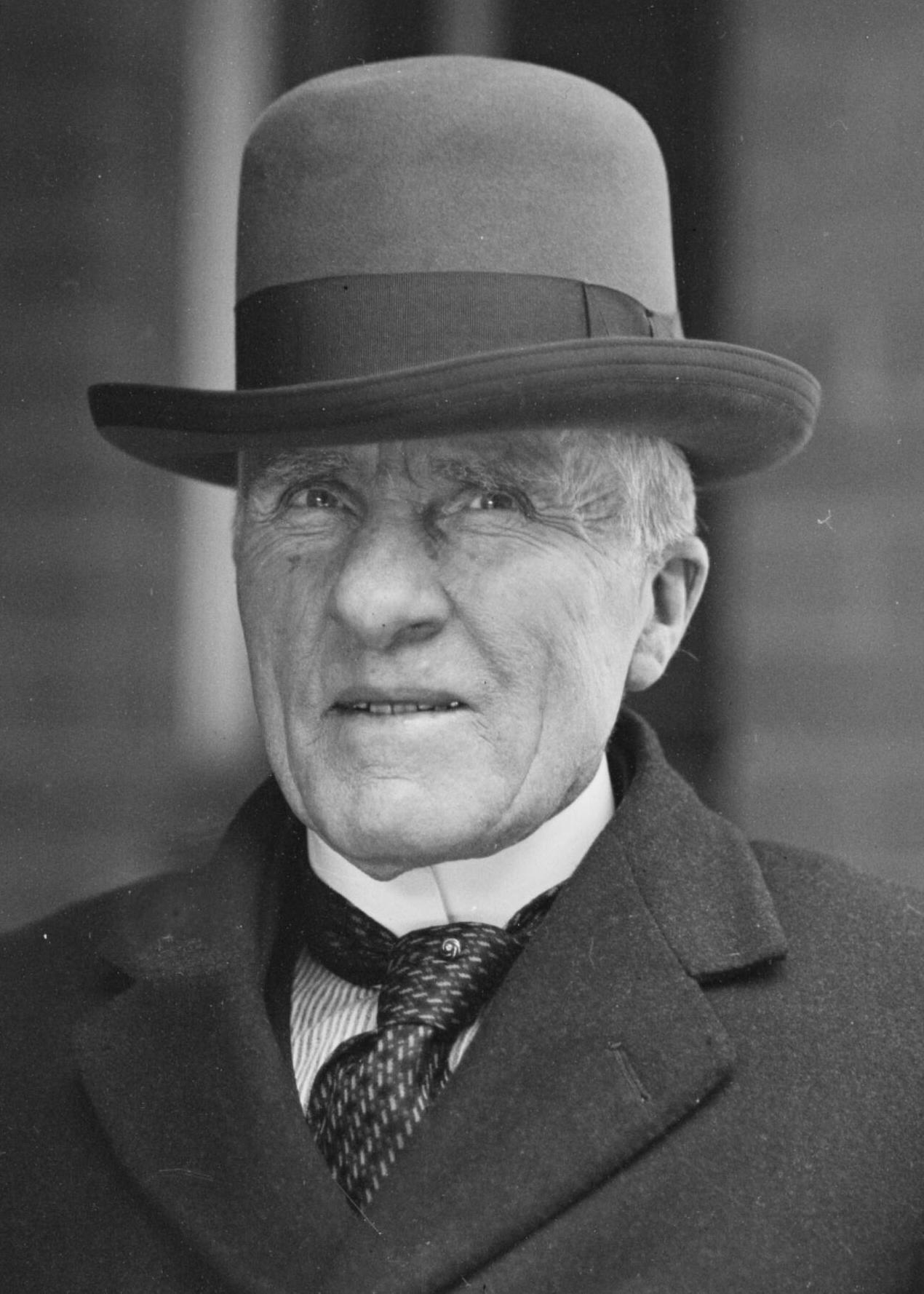
Quick in 1930

At the federal election of 1901, Quick was elected to the Australian House of Representatives as Member for the Division of Bendigo. He was initially considered a member of the Protectionist Party, but by 1903 the protectionist Age was no longer classifying him so. Partly on account of his shift to a less protectionist posture, George Reid made Quick chairman of a Royal Commission into tariffs. He held no cabinet position until 1909, when he was briefly Postmaster-General in the third cabinet under Alfred Deakin.

Quick was defeated in the 1913 election by the Australian Labor Party candidate, John Arthur. That year, Quick became the founding President of the first Bendigo Cornish Association.

In 1922, he was appointed deputy president of the Arbitration Court, which he held until his retirement on 25 March 1930.

== Later life ==
Quick continued to be a prolific author. In 1904, along with Littleton Groom, Quick published The Judicial Power of the Commonwealth, and in 1919 published The Legislative Powers of the Commonwealth and the States of Australia. After retiring in 1930, he worked on a book, which he intended to call The Book of Australian Authors, a bibliographical survey of various Australian authors, poets and playwrights. However, he died before he could complete the work.

Professor E Morris Miller continued the work, which was published in 1940 as Australian Literature from its beginnings to 1935.

== Legacy ==
La Trobe University Bendigo established the annual Sir John Quick Bendigo Lecture in 1994 in recognition of Quick's contribution to Federation and his election as Bendigo's first Federal Member of Parliament. He also helped start the Australian federation.

Political offices
Preceded by Josiah Thomas	Postmaster-General; 1909–1910	Succeeded by Charlie Frazer
Parliament of Australia
Preceded by New division	Member for Division of Bendigo; 1901–1913	Succeeded by John Arthur
