= Richard Henry Hart =

Australian school owner (1862–1884)

- Born: 1862; Ballarat East
- Died: 1884 (aged 21–22)
- Occupation: Business man, teacher
- Known for: Elected fourth Chief President of the Australian Natives' Association, a love of Music

Richard Henry Hart (1862–1884) was a school teacher, school owner and Chief President of the Australian Natives' Association (ANA).

== Early years ==
Richard Henry Hart was born in 1862 in Ballarat East, the eldest son of Grace Tresidder and the Reverend Richard Hart, a Methodist minister. Early in his life Hart was handicapped by ill health and the resulting lack of continuity of his education. Given the opportunity he attended Wesley College he studied diligently and became the first pupil at the college to pass the Melbourne University Matriculation examination. He followed his father in being a fine public speaker from an early age; he was also a talented young musician and school teacher. He trained as a teacher at his old school.

His issues with ill health caused him to move to a warmer climate, so he moved to Stawell.

In 1883 Richard Henry Hart married Elizabeth Matthews; he was 21 and she was 19 years of age.

== Community ==
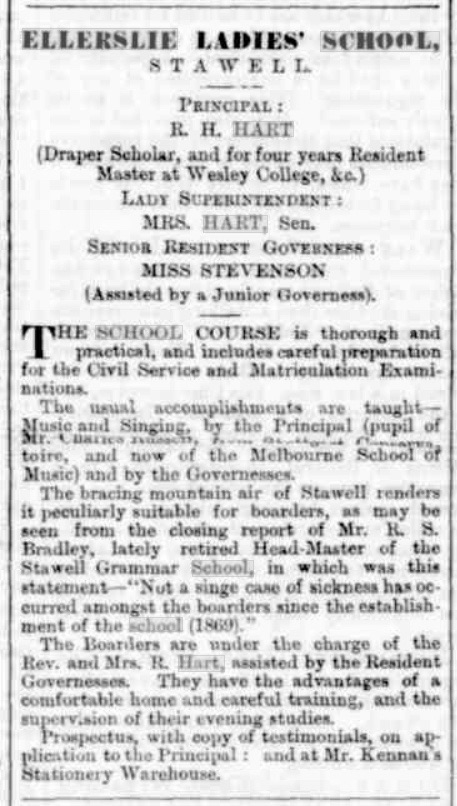
Ellerslie Ladies' School - Richard Henry Hart Advertisement 1881

About 1880 Hart established the Ellerslie Ladies' School. He ran the school with the assistance of his parents, his wife and employees. There is an intriguing public apology from Mr Charles Dumorguo for apparently impugning the Character of Hart and his school. The apology is published twice on successive days in the Melbourne Argus newspaper. He was an active member of the local Masonic Lodge in Stawell and a founding member of the local ANA Branch.

In the 1883 he stood for Parliament as a radical, and came near to defeating the sitting member.

In 1882–83 he set up a music school in Ballarat. He organised a musical Cantata "The Flower Queen" with funds to go to the ANA Ballarat branch building fund. Forty ex-pupils form his Stawell school volunteered to assist with the performance. There were over 1,000 people in the audience at Ballarat's Alfred Hall.

The Creswick grand concert on 31 October 1883 was attended through the ANA with his assistance. The next day, 1 November 1883, the Stawell conference he organised for the Cricket Club occurred. He went home suffering from peritonitis.

== Politics ==
In early 1883 Hart had a tilt at politics being the Liberal candidate for the seat of Stawell, but failed to beat the sitting member. His electoral committee was largely made up of ANA members and he was seen as a representative native and an ANA candidate.

== Australian Natives' Association ==
Hart was a founding member of the Stawell branch Number 10 of the Australian Natives' Association (ANA) in 1880. He was its first secretary and in 1882 its president, at only 20 years of age. In 1882 he was elected vice president of the association and then in January 1883 he was elected as the fifth chief president. As chief president he used his speaking skills to revitalise interest in the ANA and the broader issues of the time. He spoke about proposals by the French Government to use New Caledonia as a penal colony for some of their worst convicts and Von Bismarck's actions in annexing part of New Guinea. During 1883 when Hart was ANA chief president, the membership of the ANA grew by 40% compared to the average Friendly Society growth of 7.5%.

== Later years ==
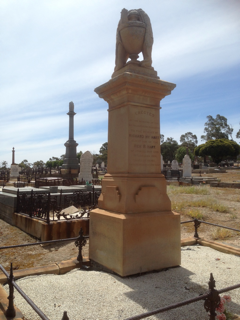
In appreciation for Hart's community standing and his contribution to the Association, the ANA erected this memorial to him.

After the Stawell Cricket Club concert, Hart suffered pain for the rest of his short life. In October 1884 he died after a long struggle with tuberculosis. A friend of the family and Methodist minister, Reverend Thomas Williams, published a memoir describing his conduct during his last months as an ideal for all Christians to follow. In a letter to Hart's mother Alfred Deakin said "He was an eloquent speaker and swayed his audience with cultured enthusiasm . . . He was an intellectual leader for the youth, their hero and teacher . . . His zeal was for the general welfare".

Hart's funeral in October 1884 was the largest that the town of Stawell had seen. 50 members of the Masonic Lodge walked in procession before his coffin, and 60 members of the Australian Natives Association walked on each side. The Ballarat Star estimated that 1,000 people witnessed the funeral procession.
