= Simon Cadden =

Australian public official

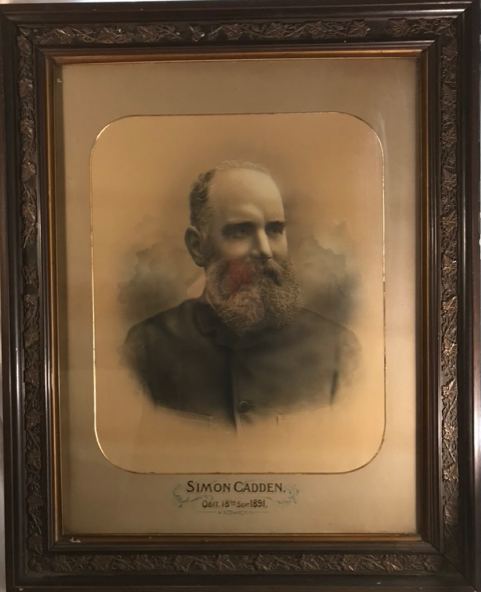
- Simon Cadden, Second ANA Chief President 1879-80
- Born: 5 January 1838; Hobart
- Died: 1891 (aged 52–53); Ballarat
- Occupation: Keeper of the Ballarat City Corporation's cattleyards
- Known for: Elected Second Chief President of the Australian Natives' Association

Simon Cadden (1838 to 1891) was a farmer, Ballarat pound keeper and Chief President of the Australian Natives' Association while Ballarat was a prosperous and growing city.

== Early years ==
Simon Cadden was born in Hobart in 1838. His father, Alex Cadden, was a Scottish emigrant and a Presbyterian; his mother Euphemia Brough was an assisted immigrant from England. Alex Cadden was a farm manager with special skills with cattle, and his son followed his father's calling.

Two bushrangers held up Cadden at his Mount Gap Station North West of Learmonth on 4 March 1862. They sacked his house and stole two of his horses. In 1865 he applied for a lease on the Yaloak Swamp in the Western District as part of a swamp reclamation scheme but the proposal was objected to by the station owner, deferred and never progressed.

On 21 January 1870 he married Eliza Jane Swifte, eldest daughter of the late Theophilus Swifte, of Campbelltown, Tasmania.

== At Ballarat ==
Cadden was elected to the Ballarat Shire Council despite an objection that he was not qualified. In 1864 he was appointed as Ballarat City Corporation's Cattle Inspector. He was the keeper of the Ballarat cattle-yards. As the municipality's functions grew he became pound-keeper and inspector of markets, often in the news for taking people to court for disregarding the city regulations.

He was the winner of prizes at the Ballarat show for best sheep dog, best cattle dog and best cattle dog bitch. He was an inveterate competitor at agricultural shows in and around Ballarat, extending his range across the decade to include prizes for cattle and fat lambs, vegetables and flowers. He was also secretary of the Ballarat Coursing Club, which organised dog races with running rabbits or hares as the lure. He was the secretary the club continuously from 1875 to 1888. He was responsible for organising coursing events at Ercildoune, Plumpton and other stations. He was secretary to the club during Samual Wilson's presidency.

By 1874 Cadden was already a man of some standing in Ballarat, rumoured several times to be a parliamentary candidate. He was a member and held responsible positions in a number of agricultural organisations and other organisations around Ballarat. These include:

- Ballarat District Road Board, member 1862;
- The Ballarat Farmers Club, secretary 1975;
- Ballarat Horticultural Society, AGM Chairman;
- Ballarat Agricultural and Pastoral Society, member from about 1864 for many years;
- Australian Natives' Association, Ballarat Branch, founding member and president 1874.

== Australian Natives' Association ==
On 10 July 1874 he chaired the meeting that founded the Ballarat Branch of the Australian Natives' Association (ANA), and was elected its first president. This was the fourth branch in the association. The branch grew rapidly, attracting in addition to benefit members many honorary members drawn by a lively program of politically-charged debates. The toast at the Branches annual meeting and dinner illustrate the developing national identity and emerging political focus. The toasts were:

- The Queen and Royal Family;
- Our Native Land;
- The Australian Natives Association;
- The Ballarat Branch;
- Our Native Industries;
- Our Colonial Forces and Navy;
- The Press;
- The Ladies.

Cadden was elected an ANA Vice President in 1877 when the first Board of Directors was elected. With the removal of the provisions forbidding political discussions removed in 1877, Caden moved:

"That the various branches of the Association be required to co-operate with this Branch in endeavouring to obtain an alteration of Land Act so as to allow Australians the privilege of selecting land throughout the Colony without complying with the Residential Clause."

The demand for privilege treatment for Australian born drew a favourable response with every ANA branch reporting its members "most happy to co-operate". While the motion brought about a draft petition with proposal for amendment from all branches, it eventually stalled. Political discussion continued within the Ballarat Branch with ultimately the ANA's strong support for federation of the Australian colonies.

When elected as the second Chief President in 1879 - 1880, Cadden tried to move the whole association into a more active role, but with limited success. The ninth branch was formed in 1879 in Charters Towers Queensland. This was the first branch outside Victoria. He presided over an expansion of the association in the old gold towns. From 1881 - 1890, Ballarat was the centre of administration for the association.

The Board led by Cadden considered "the best way to bring the Association more prominently before the public". This approach coincided with the discovery of new deposits of gold locally with resultant greater prosperity coupled with energetic promotion lead to increased membership of the young organisation. This promotion and lead to significant growth on branches in the gold mining centres around Ballarat from 1880 to 1883 there were 15 new branches created most in near by towns such as Buninyong, Hadden, Creswick and Clunes.

Cadden's term of Chief President is a time when the early nationalising activities became clearly apparent. There were essays delivered to branch meeting that were both nationalistic and racist on such subjects as:

- The Source of British Greatness;
- The Federation of the Australian Colonies ( March 1879);
- The Chinese Question.

Cadden also used symbols to foster nationalism such as buying a large Australian flag for display at functions in early 1880. This is 21 years before the Australian Federation and before there was an official Australian Flag.

In 1886 Cadden was instrumental in the formation of the Windermere Branch No. 53 of the ANA.

In an expression of "nativism" he moved a motion at the Ballarat branch of the ANA that a letter of congratulations be sent to Chief Justice Giblin of Tasmania on his appointment as acting governor. In his speech in support of the motion Cadden said that "this is the first occasion on which an Australian native had occupied such a position of trust and honour, in the colonies, so that it was fitting that the association should take cognisance of the fact".

== Later years ==
Simon Cadden died in Ballarat in 1891 after a short period of illness.

His son took over the role of Ballarat City pound keeper (Cattle Inspector).
