= George Fitzsimmons =

George Fitzsimmons may refer to:

- George Fitzsimmons (public servant)
- George Fitzsimmons (serial killer)
