= Thomas Jefferson Connelly =

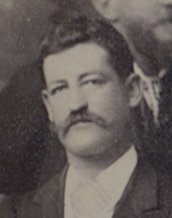
- Born: November 1858; Sandhurst, Colony of Victoria
- Died: October 1892 (aged 33); Kerang
- Occupations: Storekeeper, solicitor
- Partner: Frances Creswell Reynolds
- Children: 3
- Parent(s): Thomas James Connelly and Elizabeth Hoskin

Thomas Jefferson Connelly (1858–1892) was a storekeeper, solicitor, local politician and a Chief President of the Australian Natives' Association.

== Background ==
Thomas Jefferson Connelly was born in Sandhurst in 1858, the son of Thomas James Connelly and Elizabeth Hoskin. Their son was a storekeeper and the founder of successful firm of ironmongers. Thomas Jefferson was educated to matriculation level at the Bendigo High School. After matriculating he worked briefly in his father's business, but "trade was not to his taste".

In 1883 Connelly married Frances Creswell Reynolds, and in the next few years they had three children, two boys and a girl.

== Community ==
Connelly was active in the public life of Bendigo, serving on the committees of the hospital and the local school of mines; it was said that ‘he was connected with almost every public and charitable movement, and was very popular’. In 1885, aged only 27, he became president of the local mechanics institute. In the same year he was elected to the city council. In 1886 – the year he became president of the Sandhurst ANA – Connelly was elected mayor of the city, the first native-born Australian to achieve this. In 1887 he became Chief President of the Australian Natives Association (ANA).

== The Law ==
He was articled to a local lawyer and completed his bar examination without attending university in Melbourne, taking a partnership in a Bendigo firm of lawyers. A contemporary remembered that ‘during the years that he practised the profession of law in the city [he] earned the respect and confidence, both of his brother members of the profession and the public, and he was accounted justly one of the ablest lawyers in this city’.

Connelly worked as a solicitor and partner in various law firms and for a time as a solo practitioner in and around Bendigo. The firms he was a partner in were:

- Bennett, Attenborough, Wilks and Connelly;
- Brown, Ellison and Co.;
- Connelly and Tatchell.

== Australian Natives' Association ==
Connelly was the founding editor of the second ANA journal, the National Australian; the first issue was published in November 1885. In 1886 Connelly took on the presidency of the Sandhurst [Bendigo] branch of the Australian Natives Association, and in 1887 he became its Chief President. He was an inspirational leader of the association, preaching a nativist message that brought unparalleled growth and enthusiasm to its branches.

Thomas Connelly was influential within the ANA as a proponent of an idealist form of nativist nationalism. As he wrote in his first editorial in the National Australian in November 1885: No nation ever was, or ever could be truly great that had not generous impulses, and a deep and strong race sentiment, which inspired its poets, its musicians, its painters, and fired the hearts of hero and citizen, patriot and common soldier alike … To take what part we may in such education, and in the development of such a sentiment, is the chief end of the National Australian.

Connelly was not an orator, but his mastery of the written word was unsurpassed within the ANA, and he was a competent poet. His poem Autumn in Australia, published in the National Australian in 1886, argues that, unlike the European autumn, "a time of fading and decay", the Australian autumn was "more the early promise of the new", a time of regeneration. His conclusion drew a social moral:

So let the Autumn of the old world’s life
With crowded weary souls oppressed by caste ...
Be here the gladdening spring of free new life,
As broad and unconfined as our blue sky.
Thus makes brave seed-time in the hearts of men,
And there shall be a harvest grander yet
Than e’er our earth has known.

Connelly was instrumental in the creation of the Echuca No 52 ANA Branch in 1886. In 1888, Connelly and others visited South Australia to assist the creation of ANA in South Australia.

A painting of Connelly was commissioned and paid for by public subscription hangs in the Bendigo Art Gallery.

== Later years ==
Connelly died in October 1892, aged only 34. His obituaries blamed overwork, leading to an attack of typhoid fever which weakened his heart, followed by a ‘paralytic stroke’. He had been announced as a parliamentary candidate in the previous elections, but had withdrawn, pleading ill-health. His death was a loss to Bendigo, to the ANA, and to the progressive forces in Victorian politics.
