= Malachi James Cahill =

Australian draper and tailor (1851–1916)

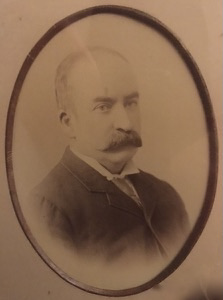
- Born: 11 June 1851; Adelaide
- Died: 23 June 1916 (aged 65); Bendigo Cemetery, Victoria
- Burial place: Bendigo Victoria
- Occupations: Draper and Tailor
- Partner: Marie Riedle
- Children: 5

Malachi James Cahill (June 1851 – June 1916) was a draper, a tailor and a Chief President of the Australian Natives' Association (ANA).

== Early years ==
Cahill was born in Adelaide in 1851 the son of John Cahill and Mary Deehan. Both parents were immigrants to South Australia. John migrating from the Bailiwick of Guernsey and Mary from former Kings County now County Offaly, Ireland. The young family moved to Sandhurst now called Bendigo in about 1857 or 1858 when Malachi was about six or seven years old. Malachi Cahill married Marie Riedle in 1885 and they had five children, Vaughan 1886, Alice 1888, Arthur 1889, Xavier 1891 and Cecily 1896.

== Business ==
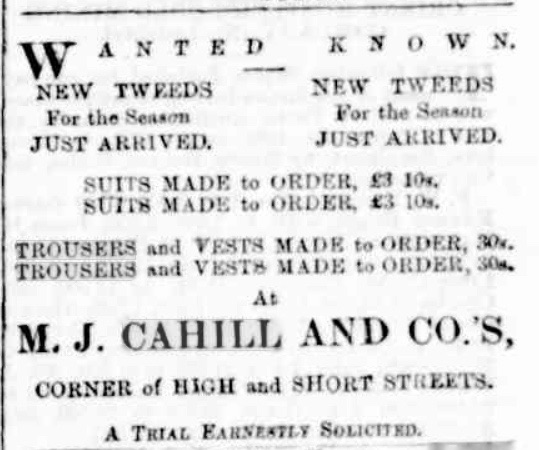
M. J. Cahill and Co. Tailors Advertisement 9 Sept 1881, Bendigo Victoria

Cahill became a cloths manufacturer and retailer in Ballarat. In 1874 it is recorded that someone tried to pass a fake cheque to his retail business. In 1882 Cahill gave evidence to a Board of Inquiry into the working hours of shop employees. He gave evidence that he had been in business for seven years, he employed 20 hands whose hours of work were 9am to 6pm in winter; 9am to 7pm in summer with the exception of Wednesdays with 2pm close and Saturdays 9am to 10pm. All the drapers in the town had the same working hours. While Cahill and others had tried longer hours, they found that it was better for their businesses to all have the same working hours. All the Sandhurst drapers including Cahill agreed to close on 10pm Saturdays in 1880.

The council agreed to provide a street gas light outside his shop on Pall Mall in 1878.

In 1881, Cahill started advertising as a tailor from a shop in High St Bendigo. High street abuts Pall Mal. He seems to have had continuing success until a little before the death of his wife in 1898 at which time advertising in the newspaper reduces and in September 1899 all his stock is liquidated. He was declared insolvent in March 1900 with the reason given as a death in the family, poor health and a drop off of business.

The year 1908 finds Cahill working as a manager for the Perfect Tailoring Company. He continued in this role until his death.

== Community ==
Cahill was active in the community predominately though his work in the ANA but also in other roles he played. Like being the secretary of a benefit entertainment in support of the widow of P. Lunch in 1879. He was also involved in planning the 1880 Easter Fair Committee Cahill as the elected ANA representative.

Other involvement was his chairmanship of the Dr John Quick's Electoral Committee up until September 1893. He was also a member of Quick's election committee in 1901, supporting his successful bid for a parliamentary seat in the first federal parliament.

== Australian Natives' Association ==
Cahill was a founding member and of the Sandhurst ANA Branch No. 5 when it opened in August 1874. He was elected as the branches first Vice President. The next year, 1875, he was elected president. He was also elected president of the branch in 1877, 1878, 1880 and 1884. Cahill remained active in the branch on committees and filling other roles until November 1896 when he tendered his resignation from the branch committee role to focus on his business. In these early years of the ANA branches grew quickly in the well populated and wealthy gold fields.

Cahill spread the word on about ANA and was participated in the opening the Eaglehawk ANA Branch No. 6 in 1876 and also the Kerang No. 19 branch in 1882.

At the 1881 ANA Ballarat conference Cahill was elected Chief President. He was the third Chief President and the second from the gold fields. Also, in the year 1881 total ANA membership climb to 430. The 1881 Census showed for the first time that The Australian born where for the first time in a majority, with 59% of the population.

At the 1884 ANA Conference in Melbourne, Cahill proposed that each Australian Colonial Government co-operatively set aside some day on the calendar for a national annual holiday. He suggested the most appropriate day would be day on which the British Flag was planted on the continent, 26 January. After a long discussion, the motion was shelved. In later years this became ANA policy and ultimately Australian Government policy that was enacted over time. The ANA was closely associated with Australia Day, on 26 January, and in Victoria it was for a long time called ANA Day.

The Ballarat and Creswick branches attained an intellectual sophistication than the Melbourne or other gold field branches with branches expanding in the gold fields and more diverse activities being available at branch meetings.

== Later years ==
Cahill's later years were punctuated by frequent personal tragedies. His wife died in 1898 as did his mother about the time he was declared insolvent. Xavier, one of his sons died on 3 June and then another son Arthur died in July 1905. On 6 June 1905 a police constable found him in a pool of blood having sustained several deep cuts to his head, he took him to hospital where he was given several stitches.

Cahill applied for release from insolvency in November 1905. After these events Cahill became a manager for Perfect Tailoring Company, where he worked until his death from heart failure in 1916.
