= Osbert Edrick Wilson =

Australian poet and author

- Born: 1857; Ballarat, Victoria, Australia
- Died: June 1901 (aged 43–44); Australia
- Occupation: Clerk
- Partner(s): Lily Araminta Guthridge, 1857–1928
- Children: Beryl Noble, one other daughter
- Parent(s): Jonathon Noble Wilson, Martha Stripling

Osbert Edrick Wilson (1857 – July 1901) was a clerk, poet, author, orator and a Chief President of the Australian Natives' Association.

== Background ==
Wilson was born in Ballarat in 1857, the son of Jonathon Noble Wilson and Martha Stripling. The father was active in public affairs; in 1885 he was mayor of Ballarat. The son – followed his father's lead. He was an active member of the Ballarat rowing, swimming and football clubs, and he was in demand for his recitations at concerts and social evenings. In July 1885 Wilson became a probationary Lieutenant in the Victorian Militia. Then in 1886 he was commissioned as a Lieutenant in the Militia at Ballarat.

In 1886, he married Lily Araminta Guthridge. She was the eighth child of Nehemiah Guthridge, an early settler in Victoria. They had two daughters.

== Australian Natives' Association ==
Wilson was active in the Australian Natives Association (ANA) in Ballarat and the region. He attended of the opening of the Horsham Branch No. 24 and also the Haddon Branch No. 25 both in 1883. He was Chief President of the ANA in 1884, and president of the Ballarat Branch in 1885. Under his leadership the association launched its first great ‘public demonstration’ – mass meetings in the Ballarat and the Melbourne Town Halls in support of the Service government's campaign for British annexation of the New Hebrides. These meetings effectively launched the ANA as a public pressure group.

In 1887 Wilson moved to Melbourne and became the founding president of the Hotham branch. He was a popular lecturer at ANA branches across the city, drawing large audiences to hear topics such as ‘Britain and her Colonies’ and the mildly republican ‘The Life of Oliver Cromwell’. His lectures seem to have become increasingly nativist and anti-imperialist in tone. In an editorial in the ANA journal the Australian Wilson declared that: A race is growing up to whom the Old World is but a name for a state of Conservatism and armed terrorism, to whom the old racial and national distinctions are as nought … They will fight strenuously to keep their native land's shores free from pollution, and their forces and money from being dragged into foreign quarrels which to Australia are of little moment.. Aveling describes Wilson as "an Australian nationalist with a fierce radical dislike of British cant, cast and imperialism. His desire was not to enter parliament but to influence national policy by making the association an active force in national policy. Under his leadership, the Board of Directors began taking an active part discussion of the national issue. Wilson wished to influence national events, not though his elevation to parliament, but by having the Association as an active force in national policy. By 1885 the aim of Federation was already a part of the Associations policy.

The ANA Board with the support of Ballarat and 4 neighbouring ANA Branches called their first public meeting with a political objective in Ballarat's Alfred Hall "to strengthen the hand of the Service Government" in dealing with national questions of federation, annexation of Papua and proposed French recidivist transportation to New Caledonia. The meeting on 22 August 1884 was accompanied by a torch lit precession of 4,000 people and was chaired by Wilson.

When James Purves led the Melbourne ANA Branch into a declaration of republicanism, Wilson was one of those members whose refusal to rise to the loyal toast scandalised Melbourne society.

Wilson was one of the attendees to a conference in 1887 to consider the creation of the ANA Metropolitan Committee to improve social interaction between branches to promote the Association and Australia. He remained an influential presence in the ANA, later moving to St Kilda, joining the St Kilda branch and acting as its representative on the ANA Metropolitan Committee.

== Later years ==
He died in 1901, aged only 44 and was buried at Boroondara Cemetery, Kew. He was survived by his wife and a daughter, Beryl Noble Wilson. Wilson, the nationalist, had the satisfaction of living to see the achievement of the federation of the Australian colonies in 1901.
