= Joseph Kirton =

Australian auctioneer, politician and secretary (1861–1935)

The Honourable Joseph William Kirton
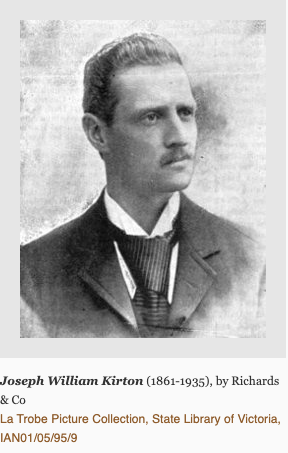
- Joseph William Kirton MLA
- In office 1 April 1889 – 21 December 1921
- Preceded by: Charles Jones
- Succeeded by: William Collard Smith

Member of the Victorian Parliament for Ballarat West
- In office 1 November 1894 – 1 May 1904
- Preceded by: William Collard Smith
- Succeeded by: Harry Bennett
- In office 1 July 1907 – 1 December 1908
- Preceded by: Harry Bennett
- Succeeded by: Andrew McKissock

Personal details
- Born: 23 November 1861 Ballarat East, Victoria, Australia
- Died: 12 October 1935 (aged 73) Balwyn, Australia
- Party: unalligned: (1889–94); (1894–1904); (1907–08)
- Spouse: Violette Finnis
- Occupation: Auctioneer and Commission Agent

Joseph William Kirton (1861 – 1935) was an Australian politician, who after primary school was apprenticed to a trade, worked in the Victorian Post and Telegraph Department, with continued studies he became an Auctioneer and Commission Agent. He served thee terms in the Victorian Parliament and became a Director and the Chief President of the Australian Natives' Association.

== Early life ==
Kirton was born in 1861 in Ballarat East, the son of boot-maker Emanuel Kirton and his wife Jane Milburn, both from Cumberland, England. After a primary education in Oldham's National School and its successor, the Dana Street State School in Ballarat he was apprenticed to a trade and then worked in the Post and Telegraph Department. He continued his studies with a tutor from the School of Mines, and became an Auctioneer and Commission Agent.

== Family ==
In 1893 he married Annie Elder Thomas, who died in 1897. In 1899 he married again, Violette Finnis.

His brother, Alfred Kirton, was elected as a Member of the Legislative Assembly representing Mornington 1932-1947.

== Beliefs ==
Kirton was a man of strong beliefs that were ‘matured within three powerful Ballarat institutions, the Lydiard Street Wesleyan Church Mutual Improvement Association, the Australian Natives’ Association, and the South Street Debating Society’. ‘A teetotaller and Sabbatarian, Kirton also expressed the concern of goldfields society for social justice and economic opportunity’.

== Politics ==
Kirton represented Ballarat West in the Victorian Legislative Assembly from 1889 to 1904, and from 1907 to 1908. In parliament he condemned privilege and fought against the abuse of free railway passes. He pioneered old age pensions and supported income tax, abolition of plural voting, and votes for women. He championed village settlement schemes and openly supported the right to strike. But his biographer comments that ‘as a minister ... he seemed to forget lifelong principles and by calling the rail strike of May 1903 a rebellion he so alienated ... his working-class support that he lost his seat’. There are no records of his parliamentary speeches.

He was Chairman of the 1897-98 Royal Commission on old age pensions, was a member of the Royal Commissions on gold mining (1889–91) and was a member of the Royal Commission into the factories and shops laws (1900–02)

Kirton was Chairman of the Ballarat Water Commission in 1903.

== Australian Natives Association ==
Joseph Kirton was a long-term member of the Ballarat ANA and its president in 1890.

Becoming a director in 1892 and Chief President of the ANA in 1895, Kirton worked to achieve a democratic form of federation for Australia, with universal suffrage and limitation of the powers of the Senate. He actively supported the "Yes" campaign for Federation.

== Later years ==
In 1911 Kirton moved to Melbourne, where he set up an estate agency and became secretary of Victorian Master Baker's Association, working with that organisation until 1921.

He died in Balwyn in 1935 survived by his second wife, two daughters and a son.
