= Electoral district of Ballarat West =

State electoral district of Victoria, Australia

Ballarat West Victoria—Legislative Assembly
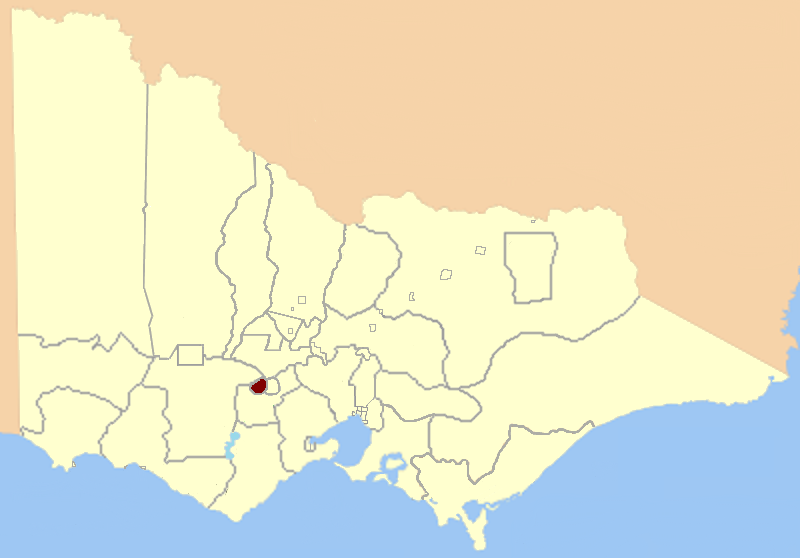
- Location in Victoria, 1859
- State: Victoria
- Dates current: 1859–1927, 1992–2014
- Electors: 43,964 (2010)
- Area: 135 km^{2} (52.1 sq mi)
- Demographic: Urbanised Rural
- Coordinates: 37°34′S 143°50′E

The Electoral district of Ballarat West (initially spelt Ballaarat West) was an electoral district of the Victorian Legislative Assembly in Australia. It existed from 1859 to 1927 and from 1992 to 2014.

The original seat was created for the second election to the Legislative Assembly in 1859. In 1927, it was merged with Ballaarat East to form a single Ballaarat electorate.

Its second implementation occurred in 1992, when it replaced Ballarat North. Unlike Ballarat East, which had a rural character, Ballarat West was mostly urban, and included much of Ballarat proper and its southern and western suburbs.

The seat was replaced by Wendouree in 2014.

== Members for Ballarat West ==
Three members from 1877 to 1889.

First incarnation (1859–1927)
Member 1	Party	Term	Member 2	Party	Term			
John Bailey	Unaligned	1859–1861	Robert Serjeant	Unaligned	1859–1861			
Duncan Gillies	Unaligned	1861–1868	William Collard Smith	Unaligned	1861–1864			
Duncan Gillies	Unaligned	1861–1868	Robert Lewis	Unaligned	1864			
Duncan Gillies	Unaligned	1861–1868	William Vale	Unaligned	1864–65, 1865–69			
Charles Jones	Unaligned	1868–69, 1869, 1869–71	John James	Unaligned	1869–1870			
Charles Jones	Unaligned	1868–69, 1869, 1869–71	Sir Archibald Michie	Unaligned	1870–1871			
Joseph Jones	Unaligned	1871–1875	William Collard Smith	Unaligned	1871–1892			
George Fincham	Unaligned	1875–1886	William Collard Smith	Unaligned	1871–1892	Member 3	Party	Term
George Fincham	Unaligned	1875–1886	William Collard Smith	Unaligned	1871–1892	Henry Bell	Unaligned	1877–1886
Charles Jones	Unaligned	1886–1889	William Collard Smith	Unaligned	1871–1892			
Charles Jones	Unaligned	1886–1889	William Collard Smith	Unaligned	1871–1892	Richard Vale	Unaligned	1886–1889
Joseph Kirton	Unaligned	1889–1894	William Collard Smith	Unaligned	1871–1892			
William Collard Smith	Unaligned	1894	Richard Vale	Unaligned	1892–			
Joseph Kirton	Unaligned	1894–1904	" "	"	–1902			
Joseph Kirton	Unaligned	1894–1904	Charles Shoppee	Ministerialist	1902–1904			
Harry Bennett	Labour	1904–1907						
Joseph Kirton	Unaligned	1907–1908						
Andrew McKissock	Labour	1908–1911						
Matthew Baird	Commonwealth Liberal	1911–1917						
Matthew Baird	Economy	1917–1918						
Matthew Baird	Nationalist	1918–1927						

Second incarnation (1992–2014)
Member	Party	Term
Paul Jenkins	Liberal	1992–1999
Karen Overington	Labor	1999–2010
Sharon Knight	Labor	2010–2014

== Election results ==
2010 Victorian state election: Ballarat West
Party	Candidate	Votes	%	±%
Liberal	Craig Coltman	17,230	43.60	+5.66
Labor	Sharon Knight	16,446	41.62	−5.49
Greens	Leon Dwyer	3,876	9.81	−0.08
Family First	Dale Butterfield	1,284	3.25	−1.78
Country Alliance	Carl Wesley	681	1.72	+1.72
Total formal votes		39,517	95.78	−0.56
Informal votes		1,740	4.22	+0.56
Turnout		41,257	93.84	+1.55
Two-party-preferred result
Labor	Sharon Knight	20,175	51.05	−5.55
Liberal	Craig Coltman	19,342	48.95	+5.55
Labor hold		Swing	−5.55	

== See also ==
- Parliaments of the Australian states and territories
- List of members of the Victorian Legislative Assembly
