= Ruth Hope Crow =

Australian activist

- Born: 14 September 1916; Ballarat, Victoria, Australia
- Died: 9 April 1999 (aged 82); Horsham, Victoria, Australia
- Occupations: Political activist, social worker, writer, and long serving member of the Communist Party of Australia

Ruth Hope Crow (née Miller) AM (14 September 1916 – 9 April 1999) was an Australian political activist, social worker, writer, and long serving member of the Communist Party of Australia. Her work ranged from establishing child care centres, youth activities and neighbourhood centres, to campaigning on topics of anti-fascism, urban planning, women's issues and the environment. Crow is credited with mentoring other women in their careers and activism, with the result that 'the whole society was politicised'.

== Early life ==
Crow was born in Ballarat, Victoria, on 14 September 1916. Her mother had been a school teacher prior to marriage. Her father was a dentist who sometimes helped Crow's uncle, Matthew Baird, a conservative Member of Parliament, to write his speeches. The death of her father in 1931 plunged her family into poverty, and they moved to Melbourne.

Crow was educated at Pleasant Street State School and, from 1930, attended Ballarat Church of England Girls Grammar School (CEGGS) on scholarship. From 1934 to 1936 she attended Emily McPherson College of Domestic Economy and gained a Diploma of Institutional Management and Dietetics, graduating with distinction. She entered on a "Free Place" and then, based on her marks, gained a Senior Technical Scholarship for the following years. However, she was unable to gain the qualification of 'dietician' because it required a further year of unpaid hospital work and self-funding of expenses such as a uniform.

Crow met Maurie Crow in 1936, they married in 1937 and had two children (1940 & 1942). They lived in The Dandenongs until towards the end of World War II, when they moved to Brunswick, Coburg and later North Melbourne.

In 1945 Crow received a bursary to train in social work at the University of Melbourne. This was a special one-year course in Group Work Techniques, Youth Leadership, as preparation for the post-war expansion of social services.

In 1988 her husband Maurie died. Crow died on 9 April 1999 at Horsham, Victoria.

== Employment ==
From 1937 to 1943 Ruth worked as a waitress, cook, assistant dietician, joint manager of a tearoom with her husband (Observatory Tea Rooms and adjoining camping ground in the Dandenong Ranges) and manager of a factory canteen. As a married woman, she could only find work by using her maiden name and working in areas where people didn't know her. From 1943 to 1944 Crow was secretary-organiser of the Brunswick Childcare Centres. These were the first federally funded wartime child care centres.

From 1946 to 1948 Crow was Club Leader at the Exhibition Youth Centre (EYC) and Education Field Officer for the Victorian Association of Youth Clubs. EYC was a community recreation scheme located in South Fitzroy.

From 1953 to 1969 Crow taught secondary school Home Economics.

In the late 1960s Crow was a freelance columnist with at the Northern Advertiser. During the 1970s Crow had similar casual employment with the Melbourne Times. Sometimes she wrote under the pen name 'Una Voce'.

== Political activism and community service ==
From 1936 to 1996 Crow was a political activist. Crow and her husband were partners in both life and activism up until his death in 1988, after which Crow continued alone.

Crow said that her views changed greatly from 1933, when she was one of thousands of Australians greeting the visiting German battleship Koln because it flew the Nazi flag, to 1936 when she joined the Communist Party. She was influenced by Egon Kisch's protest against Nazism, and the attempt to exclude Kisch from Australia in 1934. In 1936 Crow was secretary on the Student Council, and was delegate representing them to a student conference on war and fascism called 'Youth What Next?'

In 1935–1936 Crow was Secretary Student Council at Emily McPherson College.

In 1938 she was involved in research on the topic of food health and income in Victoria, with the results published in a booklet edited by Marjorie Coppel in 1939.

From 1939 to 1942 Crow helped to establish a chain of youth hike hostels in the Dandenong Ranges.

From 1943 to 1944 Crow was Honorary Secretary for the South Yarra Day Nursery. She was member of the Committee for Coordinating Child Care in Wartime. In 1946 Crow helped initiate the Day Nursery Development Association. In 1948 Crow was part of a delegation of the Victorian Association of Creches who planned to speak to the Premier Thomas Hollway about the continuation of child care after the wartime efforts, however the Premier refused to meet the delegation while it included a communist. As a result, Crow was asked to resign from the organisation. From 1949 to 1954 Crow was involved with organisations which offered leisure time activities for children such as dance, drama, sports, and music. In 1950 Crow was organiser of the Victorian Junior Eureka Youth League, and in 1952 Secretary of the Adult Advisory Committee of the Junior Eureka League in Melbourne.

With Maurie Crow she wrote "Plans for Melbourne Part 1, 2, and 3". Crow was one of the main people responsible for publishing a monthly newsletter on urban issues called "Irregular", and later called "Ecoso Exchange".

In 1977 Crow was involved in the book "Seeds for Change – Creatively Confronting, the Energy Crisis".

In the late 1970s Crow participated in the Melbourne City Council Consultation on Children's Services.

Crow was arrested for graffitiing a wall in Melbourne with the words "No scrap iron for Japan".

Crow was a prominent member of the Union of Australian Women.

== Awards ==
In 1972 Crow, with her husband, was jointly awarded a Robin Boyd Information Award by the Victorian Chapter of the Royal Australian Institute of Architects for 'consistently valuable and perspective contributions to the literature of planning issues in Melbourne' for her work on "Plan for Melbourne Parts 1, 2 and 3", "Irregular", and elsewhere.

In 1973 Crow, with her husband, was jointly awarded the Barrett Medal by the Town and Country Planning Association for 'notable contribution to planning'.

In the late 1970s Crow was made a Life Member of Community Child Care in recognition of her contribution to establishing the organisation.

In 1993 Crow was made a Member of the Order of Australia for 'service to the community through the promotion of participative environmental and social planning'.

A plaque in the Royal Park commemorates Crow and her husband.

In 2008 Crow was inducted into the Victorian Honour Roll of Women.

== The Crow Collection ==
In 1990 Crow donated her personal papers, approximately 2000 books and 700 pamphlets, to Victoria University. The collection of working papers and printed material (both published and unpublished) relate to the campaign work of Crow and her husband, including Crow's work with women and children in Brunswick during World War II, and Maurie Crow's in the Clerk's Union, and the pioneering work they did from the 1960s onwards in relation to public participation in urban planning, building neighbourhood communities and creating a sustainable future. Many of the publications of Ruth and Maurie Crow were digitised in the 2011 ASHER funded Crow Papers Digitisation Project.

The Crow Collection has been extended by donations from Mannie Biederberg, Alvie Booth, Jack Cotter, Bert Davies, Lloyd Edmonds, Ken Gott, Rivkah Mathews, Joyce Nicholson, John Reeves, Percy Rogers, and Colin Watson.

In February 1991 the Crow Collection Association was founded. The Association published one of Australia's earliest environmental issues journals, the Ecoso Exchange Newsletter. The 2011 Crow Papers Digitisation Project made available many of the issues of the Ecoso Exchange (1973–1999) and its predecessor, Irregular (1967–1972).

In 1996 the Crow Collection Association was involved in the Ideas Exchange Project which took up the theme of the 1995 Senate Inquiry, 'What Sort of Society Do You Want Australia To Be?'

To commemorate Ruth Crow's death in April 1999 the Crow Collection Association held a memorial celebration of Ruth's life at the North Melbourne Town Hall on 21 May 1999. This event was attended by over 500 people.

At the last meeting of the Crow Collection Association on 25 February 2003 the members in attendance voted in favour of winding up the Association and handing over its remaining assets to Victoria University Library. The Library was entrusted to use these funds to promote research in the subject areas that were of interest to Ruth and Maurie Crow. Funds from the Crow Collection Association trust were used to compile an archive of Ruth Crow's papers in 2004. In 2011 Federal Government funding under the ASHER program was granted to VU Library to undertake a digitisation project of significant unpublished and out of print material from the Crow Papers.

The University of Melbourne also holds a collection related to Crow and her activities with the Communist Party.
