= Andrew McKissock =

Australian trade unionist and politician (1873–1919)

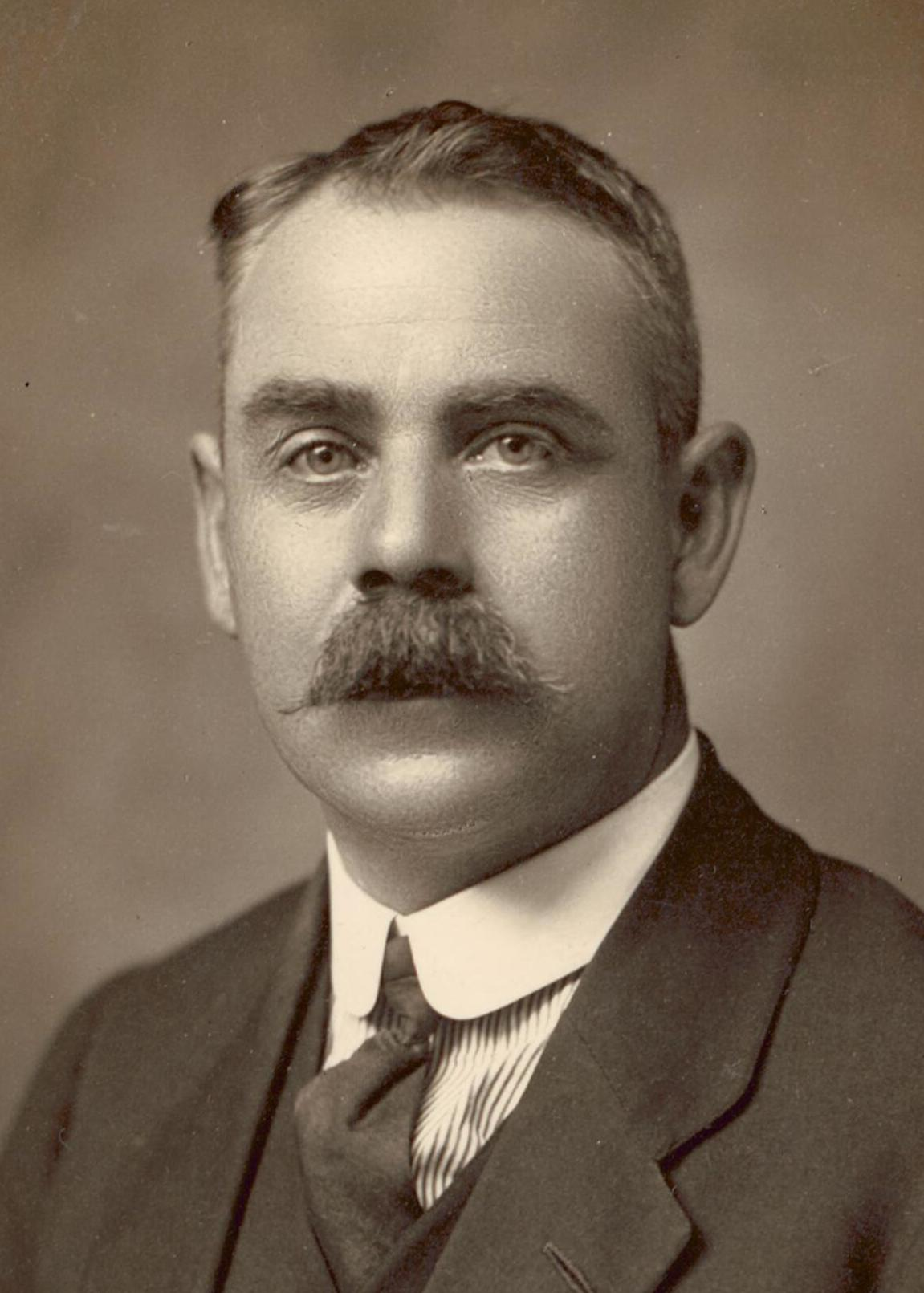

Senator for Victoria
- In office 5 September 1914 – 30 June 1917

Member of the Victorian Legislative Assembly
- In office 1 December 1908 – 1 October 1911
- Preceded by: Joseph Kirton
- Succeeded by: Matthew Baird
- Constituency: Ballarat West

Personal details
- Born: 6 December 1873 Ballarat, Victoria, Australia
- Died: 17 July 1919 (aged 45) Ballarat, Victoria, Australia
- Party: Labor
- Spouse: Margaret Keay (m. 1899)
- Occupation: Printer

Andrew Nelson McKissock (6 December 1873 – 17 July 1919) was an Australian trade unionist and politician. He was a member of the Australian Labor Party (ALP) and served as a Senator for Victoria from 1914 to 1917. He was also a member of the Victorian Legislative Assembly from 1908 to 1911.

== Early life ==
McKissock was born on 6 December 1872 in Ballarat East, Victoria. He was the son of Helen (née Rattray) and John McKissock, his father being a butcher.

McKissock was educated at a local school in Ballarat and then apprenticed to a compositor. In 1896, he travelled to South Africa and met up with "a group of young adventurers from his home town", calling themselves the Ballarat Boys. He briefly worked in Cape Town as a printer. McKissock and two others subsequently enlisted in Herbert Plumer's Matabele Relief Force and took part in the Second Matabele War. His unit proceeded to Mafeking on foot and took part in several engagements, culminating in the Battle of Umlugulu Mountain. He detailed his experiences in letters to the Ballarat Courier, and after the war's end resumed working as a compositor with Ballarat newspapers and printers.

McKissock became involved in the labour movement as a member of the Ballarat Typographical Society. He became a delegate to the Ballarat Trades and Labor Council in 1900 and later served as the council's president. He was also chairman of the Eight Hours Committee, president of the Ballarat branch of the Tramways Employees' Association, and chairman of the Victoria–Riverina branch of the Australian Workers' Union (AWU).

== State politics ==
McKissock was an unsuccessful Labor candidate at the 1907 state election, running in the seat of Ballarat West. He reprised his candidacy at the 1908 election and was elected by 81 votes. In parliament he spoke mainly on workers' issues and local matters. He was defeated at the 1911 election after a single term and subsequently joined the staff of the Evening Echo, the ALP's newspaper in Ballarat.

== Federal politics and later activities ==
McKissock was elected to the Senate at the 1914 federal election, which saw the ALP win all six Senate seats in Victoria. He was not a regular speaker in parliament, but as an anti-conscriptionist "vigorously attacked the concept of conscription and the Military Service Referendum Bill, both of which he held to be essentially undemocratic". He remained in the ALP following the 1916 party split over conscription, but was defeated at the 1917 election after a single term.

After his defeat, McKissock attempted to return to state parliament, unsuccessfully contesting the seat of Ballarat East at the 1917 Victorian state election. He was subsequently appointed as a professional organiser for the ALP, concentrating on rural areas.

== Personal life ==
McKissock married Margaret Keay in 1899, with whom he had two daughters. He died on 17 July 1919 at the age of 46 as a result of the Spanish flu pandemic.
