= George Fitzsimmons (public servant) =

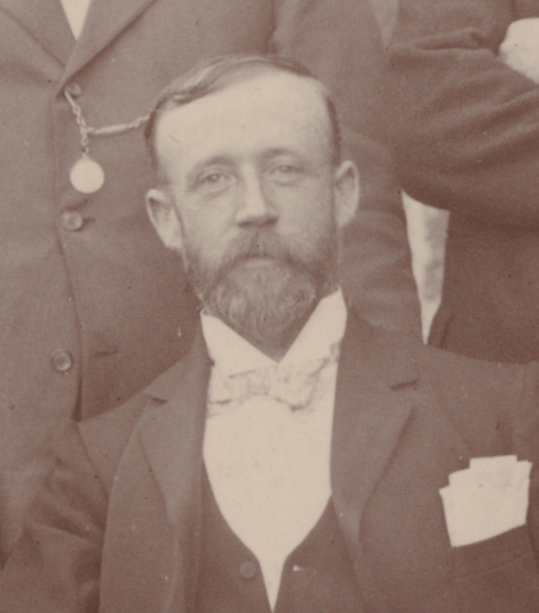
- Born: 1858; Ballarat East, Colony of Victoria
- Died: 23 September 1933 (aged 74–75); Brighton, Victoria, Australia
- Occupations: Letter server, clerk, footwear manufacturer
- Partner: Alice Scates
- Parent(s): John Fitzsimmons and Ellen Lindsay

George Fitzsimmons (1858–1933) was a letter server, a clerk and a Chief President of the Australian Natives' Association.

== Background ==
Fitzsimmons was born in Ballarat East in 1858, the son of John Fitzsimmons and Ellen Lindsay. In 1877 he married Alice Scates. He joined the Victorian Post Office and Telegraph Department in 1875 as a letter server.

== Employment ==
After Fitzsimmons joined the Victorian Post Office and Telegraph Department as a letter server in 1875, and by the 1890s had worked his way up to the position of clerk. In 1901, as a result of the Federation of the Australian States, the Victorian Post Office and Telegraph Department became part of the Australian Postmaster General's Department. For a number of years he was responsible for the Private Letters Branch. Fitzsimmons retired in 1916 after over 41 years of employment.

Fitzsimmons became a Justice of the Peace (JP).

== Australian Natives' Association ==
Fitzsimmons joined the Ballarat Branch of the ANA. In 1883 he moved to Prahran and was secretary of the Prahran branch for 44 years from 1889 to 1933, and in 1894 Chief President of the association. His election was despite an objection from the floor of the conference that he was a Civil Servant. He was a well-liked, able administrator.

At the Prahran branch of the ANA he did not serve as president—the usual point of departure for the chief presidency—but as secretary, with responsibility for fees and membership. Another public role in 1894 was being a master of the Prahran Loyal Orange Lodge, a conservative and anti-republican body. 1894 was a past master to the Windsor Masonic Lodge and was chaplain to the lodge for 30 years

The 1894 ANA Warrnambool Conference passed a series of radical motions adopting as ANA "planks" a tax on the unimproved value of land, a minimum wage for workers in public utilities, and full adult suffrage. George Fitzsimmons was elected Chief President at the head of a board containing a majority of men who had initiated or actively supported these motions. Many branch members objected to these motions as "party political", and called for them to be rescinded. Fitzsimmons was not personally inclined to be radical, but he stood with his board and ignored calls to rescind the resolutions, while taking no action to promote them.

ANA membership rose by 550 members to 10,200 during the year Fitzsimmons was Chief President.

Fitzsimmons attended the opening of the remote and Walhalla ANA Branch No.151 on the way to the 1895 Bairnsdale Conference. He also served as a Trustee of the Friendly Societies Garden as the ANA representative from 1896 - 1906.

He spent 44 year as Secretary of the Prahran Branch, from 1889 to 1933.

== Later years ==
Fitzsimmons died at home in Brighton on September 23, 1933, at 74 years old.
