= John William Larter =

Australian station master, auctioneer, insurance agent and politician (1858–1911)

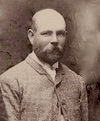
- Larrer in 1890
- Born: 1858; Kyneton, Australia
- Died: 4 August 1911 (aged 47–48); Sydney, Australia
- Occupations: Station master, auctioneer, insurance agent, politician

John William Larter (1858 – September 1911) was an Australian station master, auctioneer, insurance agent and politician.

== Background ==
Larter was born in Kyneton, in 1858, the son of railway employee George Henry Larter and Mary Ann Halliday. Larter, aged about 16 years old followed his father into the railways; in 1883 he was listed in the Freemasons’ Register as Station Master at Craigieburn.

In 1880, Larter married Rosa Elizabeth Crisp.

== Employment ==
Initially joining the railway in about 1874 he progressed to Station Master at Craigieburn in 1883. In 1886, he ran a business as an auctioneer and insurance agent. In 1893, he was made a magistrate and then chief magistrate.

== Community ==
The first report of Larter in Ballarat is "a notice from Messrs Larter and Crisp, house, land, and estate agents, 4 Peel street north", and then at a land sale in July 1885.

Apart from his not insignificant activity in the ANA Larter was involved in a number of important community organisations. Some examples include:

- In 1891 Larter is recorded as being President and a life member of the Ballarat Imperial Football Club attending their annual meeting with Joseph Kirton (ANA Chief President 1895). He became a Life Patron of the club in 1891.
- Ballarat Swimming Club had Larter as Mayor attend their Annual Meeting with Carthy Salmon (ANA Chief President 1898) in 1993.
- The Ballarat Cricket Club had Larter on its committee of management.
- He was President of the Bowling Club in 1994.
- Larter was appointed to a committee to consideration the legal standing of the brigade Fire-brigade in 1889. He also participated in other ways to support the brigade including becoming a member. He retired from the Fire-brigade in 1893.
- He participated in the Ballarat Water Commission Annual Meeting 1893.
- Attended meeting of the Benevolent Asylum committee.
- Larter was on the committee for the Ballarat Australian Juvenile Industrial Exhibition.
- Participated in the formation of a Debating Society in 1886.
- In 1994 the Orphans Asylum voted to appoint Larter and others as Life Governors "in recognition for valuable services rendered to the asylum.

Larter was also involved in providing evidence in liquor licensing matters as a witness.

== Politics ==
Larter successfully ran for the Ballarat East Council in 1889 a number of times becoming Mayor in 1893/94.

In the 1889 municipal elections a letter of pamphlet was circulated imputing Larter's actions. His response was to call a formal public meeting at the White Horse hotel with Mr Searle in the chair. After addressing the meeting on his position he produced his letter-copying hook to the meeting to prove that he had taken active steps, with other gentlemen, to procure the establishment of several factories and work shops in Ballarat East. Larter was elected in 1889.

In 1894 the issues he understood were on the minds of rates payers were:

- amalgamation of the Ballarat East municipality with the Ballarat municipality;
- electric lighting in the streets of Ballarat East;
- the wage question;
- tolls; and
- several other matters of importance to the ratepayers.

Latter was very active in the community and a popular councillor and mayor.

== Australian Natives' Association ==
Larter was a foundation member of the Ballarat East Branch No. 128 of the in 1886. Although it is numbered branch 128, it was the 100th branch as 28 branches had started twice. He was the first Secretary of the branch. Locally and with the support of the ANA branch he inspired organised opposition to the alienation of the park in Russel Square.

In its 21 years the ANA had grown to 10,000 members and had doubled its six over the previous six years. The association continued to express members view on national affairs and was arousing a strong interest in federation of the states and a desire to advance Australia. In 1911, he wrote a letter on behalf of the Branch and ANA board to the municipal council seeking permission to effect improvements at the Eureka Stockade.

== Later years ==
Larter moved to Woolloomooloo, New South Wales about the turn of the century as Australian federation was taking place. He died on Friday 4 August 1911.
