= James Purves (politician) =

Australian politician

James Liddell Purves
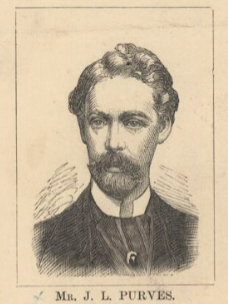
- Born: 3 August 1843; Melbourne, Colony of New South Wales
- Died: 24 November 1910 (aged 67); South Yarra, Australia
- Occupations: Barrister, Politician
- Partner(s): Annie Lavinia Grice, Eliza Emma Brodribb
- Children: 7
- Parent(s): James Purves, Caroline Guillod

James Liddell Purves QC (23 August 1843 – 24 November 1910) was an Australian barrister, politician. and a Chief President of the Australian Natives' Association.

== Background ==
James Liddell Purves was born in Swanston Street, Melbourne, on 23 August 1843, the eldest son of James Purves and his wife Caroline. His father became a prosperous importer, race-horse-breeder and station-owner, and he gave his son the best possible education – in Melbourne, then in Germany and Belgium and at King's College London. After matriculating in 1861 Purves initially travelled in Europe before initially entering Trinity College, Cambridge with medicine in mind. He quickly changed to study law at Lincoln's Inn, London. He travelled widely on the Continent and at times supported himself by writing for London journals.

== The Law ==
In 1865 he was called to the English Bar and in 1866 on his return to Melbourne he was admitted to the Victorian Bar. Purves' biographer notes that 'this varied education produced quick intelligence, a fluent and often brilliant tongue, and great charm'. She also notes that 'his influence of colonial opinion and practice [was] based less on intellect than on personality and style'.

Within the legal profession Purves showed a flair for spectacular cases that were widely reported in the press. By the 1880s he was briefed to appear in almost every important jury case, and was retained as standing counsel by a large number of public and private institutions, including the Victorian railways. In 1886 he was appointed Q.C. and acknowledged as a leader of the Victorian bar. His success depended less on abstract legalities than on a ready grasp of technical skills and an ability to easily make disputed points clear to a jury. His significant contribution to forensic law in Victoria was the development of a new style of cross-examination, a persistent and focussed questioning by which a defensive witness could be led to trip up and prejudice his own case.

In the early 1890s Purves successfully defended the Age in two libel cases, of which the most famous and politically significant, Speight v. Syme, carried a great load of involved technical evidence; its hearing took 98 days and a subsequent appeal of 86 days was also lost.

Purves was President of the Victorian Bar from 1900 to 1903.

== Writing ==
Purves published his diary of the trip to London in 1856 as A Young Australian's Log and contributed to his support by writing articles for London newspapers and journals.

In Melbourne in the late 1860s he made contributions to Talk of the Town and to the Melbourne Herald. He also became co-editor of the Australian Jurist

== Politics ==
Purves was elected for the electorate of Mornington in the Victorian Legislative Assembly on 1 April 1872 as a free trader and constitutionalist. Where he served until 1 February 1880. During this time he soon became known for his oratory. He was offered cabinet rank on several occasions, but his talents and inclinations lay with ideological debate rather than administration. In February 1880 he made a surprising decision to contest the working-class electorate of Footscray, where he was defeated. He tried and lost again in the liberal stronghold of Maryborough in July the same year. He gave up parliamentary ambition and turned his talents in other directions.

== Family ==
In 1875 he had married Annie Lavinia Grice in St. Peter's Church, Melbourne; she died in childbirth, and in 1879 he married Eliza Emma Bobridd in St Mark's Church, Darling Point, Sydney. He had one son by his first marriage and two sons and three daughters by the second.

They holidayed at their Family property in Cove Avenue Portsea.

== Australian Natives' Association ==
From the mid-1880s Purves' political talents were channelled through the ANA. He became a regular speaker at ANA public meetings supporting Australian federation and British annexation of the Pacific islands. In his addresses to these meetings Purves developed a vague and ardent vision of Australia's future greatness which he placed sometimes within a renewed British empire, sometime in glorious national independence. This nativist vision was based on the belief – widely accepted within the ANA – that the Anglo-Saxon race would evolve to new heights in Australia, and that the superior virtues of the new race were limited to the native-born.

Purves often claimed to be a founder of the Australian Natives Association, but he was not present at the meetings which created the association in 1871. He spoke at a 'Grand Concert and Ball' held by the ANA in mid 1872, and in 1874 he was elected as one of many vice-presidents – a purely honorary position. His involvement really dates from 1884, when he gave the first of many speeches to the association invoking Australian nativism and British neglect. Speaking to a motion advocating Australian federation, he moved rapidly from its virtues to its consequences: 'the time had arrived when they must either assist the mother country, or set out on life's journey by themselves'. England's motives in establishing the colonies had been 'selfish', 'to deliver the offscourings of her civilisation upon the shores of Australia'. Australia desired nothing more than to be 'one of the brightest jewels in an Imperial Crown', but 'if our wishes continued to be disregarded … England would run a mighty risk of losing us altogether. (Cheers)'. These were themes that he would bring to the association as its Chief President in 1888 and again in 1889: a time known by his friends and foes alike as 'the reign of the Emperor'. Despite never having held office within the association. His two years as Chief President were marked more by oratorical fireworks than by constructive leadership. Conservatives denounced him – and the nativism of the association – as disloyal to the British Empire; republicans wavered between praising his claims for Australian independence, and condemning him as a covert imperialist. But the association grew in members and branches under his leadership, and his oratory aroused in its members a strong sense of responsibility for their country's future.

Across the 1890s Purves was active and effective in the long crusade to persuade Victorians to support Australian federation, but he never took on a leadership role; he had no patience with negotiations and compromises. He failed to be elected to the Victorian delegation to the Federal Conventions of 1897–1898, but was prominent in the dramatic crusading and canvassing in the last days before the first federal referendum.

== Sport ==
Purves was also prominent in Victorian sporting circles as an owner of fine race-horses, a champion shot, and a keen lawn-tennis player and a yachtsman.

== Later years ==
Purves continued to represent clients in court in later years. He died at his residence Wangenella in Rockley Rd South Yarra on 24 November 1910. He is buried in the St Kilda Cemetery.
