= Australasian Women's Association =

Australian Women's support society

The Australasian Women's Association (AWA) was a Friendly Society formed in 1900 to provide social support and health benefits to Australian-born women. Its formation was sponsored by the Australian Natives' Association to fill a growing need to social supports such as health care, unemployment benefits, and funeral benefits to working women and their families.

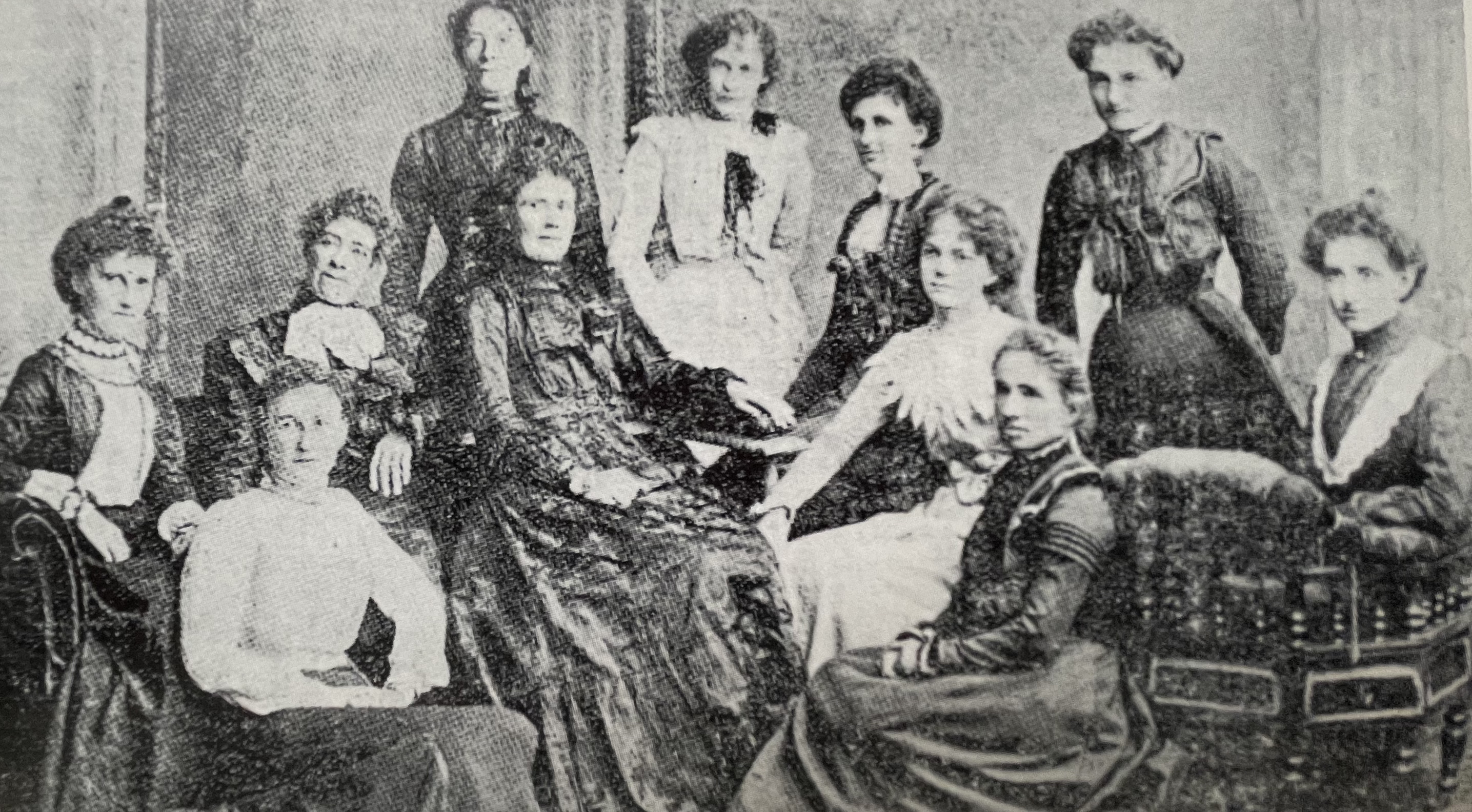
Australasian Women's Association AWA First Board of Directors November 1900, Left to Right: Miss O'Connor, Miss Tapner, Mrs Taylor, Miss Potts, Miss Robertson, Miss Hickman, Miss Cullin, Miss Wilson, Miss Murray; Front Row: Miss Cooke, Mrs Ley

Of the many Benefit Societies in Australia only two admitted women, and the Catholic Ladies Benefit Branch of Hibernian Australasian Catholic Benefit Society, a registered Friendly Society, admitted only female members.

Between the 1871 and 1891 censuses, female breadwinners had increased from 52,243 to 114,804. In November 1899 the ANA Board supported the creation of a Friendly Society for women. In August 1900 its constitution and bye-laws were passed, and the society registered in September 1900.

In November the Australasian Women's Association (AWA) was formed. The ANA absorbed all the expenses of setting up the Association, which commenced with seven branches in Victoria and 405 members. It grew with time and had branches in each state.

The AWA held annual conferences where they accepted resolutions from their branches about governance and social issues. An example is the 1903 conference where there were resolutions of:

- annual election and rate of payment for the General Secretary
- appointment of auditors
- water conservation
- compulsory vaccination
- swimming

The ANA and AWA worked closely together and at times jointly published documents listing key office holders.

The changing circumstances after WW2 and the greater involvement of the Federal Government in providing social supports started to challenge Friendly Societies including the AWA. In 1955 the ANA took steps to enable AWA members to transfer to the ANA. A past AWA Chief President, Mrs. I. V. Meagher, became the first woman Chief President of the ANA in 1977.
