= Harry Scott Bennett =

Australian politician

Harry Scott Bennett (1 June 1877 – 24 May 1959), originally Henry Gilbert Scott Bennett, was an Australian socialist speaker and organiser. He was born in Chilwell, Victoria and died in Sydney.

He was MLA for Ballarat West, Victoria for the Labor Party 1904–1907.

He spent 1913–1915 in New Zealand (where John A. Lee heard him while they were in prison) and 1915–1917 in the United States.

== Notes ==
- Page at Australian Dictionary of Biography
- Page on Victorian Parliament website
- Olssen, Erik. "Henry Gilbert Scott Bennett". Dictionary of New Zealand Biography. Ministry for Culture and Heritage.
