= Paul Jenkins (politician) =

Australian politician (born 1938)

Geoffrey Paul Jenkins (born 5 March 1938) is an Australian former politician.

Jenkins was born in Ballarat and attended Redan Primary School, Ballarat High School and Ballarat School of Mines. In 1952 he took an apprenticeship with H. L. Pullen, but in 1958 underwent national service. On his return, as an electrical mechanic, he worked for a number of companies until becoming a self-employed contractor and company director in 1961. In 1985 he was elected to Sebastopol Borough Council, serving until 1993 (and as mayor from 1989 to 1990). In 1992 he was elected to the Victorian Legislative Assembly as the Liberal member for Ballarat West. He retired on 17 September 1999.

Victorian Legislative Assembly
New seat	Member for Ballarat West; 1992–1999	Succeeded by Karen Overington
