= Richard Vale =

Australian politician

Richard Taylor Vale (30 August 1836 – 18 June 1916) was an Australian bookseller and politician.

Born in London to John Vale and Elizabeth Taylor, he attended Cowper Street School before working as a wholesale stationer. In March 1853 he arrived in Victoria and briefly mined for gold at Castlemaine before opening a bookshop. He moved his business to Beechworth in 1854 or 1855. He returned to England in 1860–62 before establishing a bookshop at Smythesdale, finally settling in Ballarat in 1869. In 1865 he married Gertrude Campbell at Scarsdale, with whom he had seven children. In 1886, he was elected to the Victorian Legislative Assembly as the member for Ballarat West, serving until 1889 and again from 1892 to 1902. From 1894 to 1896 he was a minister without portfolio. Vale died in 1916 at Ballarat.

Vale for a while owned the historic property Eyres House, Soldiers Hill, Ballarat.
