= Karen Overington =

Australian politician

Member of the Victorian Parliament for Ballarat West
- In office 18 September 1999 – 2 November 2010
- Preceded by: Paul Jenkins
- Succeeded by: Sharon Knight

Personal details
- Born: Karen Marie Brown; 16 November 1951 Ballarat, Victoria, Australia
- Died: 11 August 2011 (aged 59) Ballarat, Victoria, Australia
- Party: Labor Party
- Spouse: Brian Overington (1970–2009; his death)
- Children: 2
- Occupation: Politician, welfare worker

Karen Marie Overington (16 November 1951 – 11 August 2011) was an Australian politician. She was a Labor Party member of the Victorian Legislative Assembly from 1999 to 2010, representing the electorate of Ballarat West.

Overington was born Karen Marie Brown in Ballarat and attended Sacred Heart College. She worked as an electorate officer from 1984 to 1992 and as a Uniting Church outreach worker from 1994 to 1999. She had a lengthy career in local government before her election to parliament, serving as a councillor for the Borough of Sebastopol from 1982 until 1994, with a stint as mayor in 1990–1991. The council was merged with several neighbouring ones in 1994, and Overington won election to the larger City of Ballarat council at its first election in 1996, serving in that role until her election to parliament.

Overington was elected to parliament on her second attempt as part of Labor's victory in the 1999 elections, having lost one prior attempt in 1993. She was re-elected with little difficulty in 2002 and 2006, winning 55.5 per cent of the vote at the 2006 election.

Overington was married with two children. Her husband, Brian Overington, died in 2009, and she was diagnosed with cancer shortly afterwards. She retired from parliament at the 2010 state election and died on 11 August 2011.

Victorian Legislative Assembly
| Preceded by Paul Jenkins | Member for Ballarat West; 1999–2010 | Succeeded by Sharon Knight |
