= Matthew Baird (politician) =

Australian politician

Matthew Baird (15 October 1879 – 14 January 1930) was an Australian politician.

Born at Mount Blowhard, Victoria, to Scottish-born parents Robert Baird, a farmer, and Agnes McKerrow, he attended Learmonth State School and University College in Ballarat. After working on his father's farm he served in South Africa from 1901 to 1902 as a trooper with the Victorian Mounted Rifles. After his matriculation in 1904 he was admitted as a solicitor in 1910, partnering with his brother Robert. He married Ruby Melita Coutts in 1913. Having joined the citizen militia, he became a captain in 1913 and served in the Australian Imperial Force from 1915 to 1916 in Egypt and Gallipoli as a major, where he was wounded and sent home. In November 1911 he had been elected to the Victorian Legislative Assembly for Ballarat West, representing the Liberal Party. From November 1917 to March 1918 he was Minister of Public Instruction; he later held the portfolios of Minister for Labour (1919–20) and Chief Secretary and Minister for Public Health (1919–23). Baird held the seat until its abolition in 1927, when he tried and failed to win the new seat of Ballarat. He died in 1930 at Ballarat.

Baird's niece (by marriage) was Ruth Crow AM, a member of the Communist Party and political activist.
