= William Collard Smith =

Australian politician

Lieutenant-Colonel Hon. William Collard Smith (19 July 1830 – 20 October 1894) was a politician in colonial Victoria (Australia), a member of the Victorian Legislative Assembly, and a Minister of Education from 1880 to 1881.

Smith was youngest son of William Smith, manager of a large cotton factory at Bollington, in Cheshire, England, where he was born. He emigrated to Victoria in 1852, and ultimately settled at Ballarat, of which he was mayor in 1874–75 and 1887–88. Identifying himself with the mining interest, he began to acquire that ascendency in the local politics of the goldfields' city, which he for many years maintained.

Smith was returned to the Legislative Assembly in August 1861 for Ballarat West, in conjunction with the ex-Premier of Victoria, Duncan Gillies, and after a brief retirement stood again in 1871, when he was returned, and represented the constituency without intermission till April 1892, when he was defeated. Lieut.-Colonel Smith, who holds that rank in the local forces, early identified himself with the volunteer movement, and distinguished himself in Parliament by his mastery of the Local Government question. He was Minister of Mines in Graham Berry's first Government from August to October 1875, and held the same office in conjunction with that of Minister of Education in Berry's second Cabinet from May 1877 to March 1880. He also acted as Treasurer of Victoria during his chief's absence in England on the famous "Embassy" from December 1878 to November 1879. In Berry's third Administration Colonel Smith was Minister of Education from August 1880 to July 1881. He was one of the delegates to the Federation Convention held in Sydney in March 1891, and the next year lost his seat for Ballarat West. In September 1894 Smith was again elected for Ballarat West, but died soon afterward.
