= Charles Jones (Victorian politician) =

Australian politician

Charles Edwin Jones (1828 – 18 March 1903) was an Australian politician, member of the Victorian Legislative Assembly 1864 to 1871 and 1886 to 1889.

== Biography ==
Jones was born in Plymouth, Devon, England, to Welsh tailor John Jones and Elizabeth, née Tucker, becoming a tailor like his father. He became involved in radical and temperance causes and vigorously opposed Roman Catholicism. He married Anne Letitia Angear at Devonport in 1850, and in 1851 the couple migrated to Melbourne where Jones continued to work as a tailor until 1862. He was elected to Melbourne City Council in 1862 and remained until October 1865, his activism against Premier John O'Shanassy's "Irish ministry" led him to be associated with the protectionists despite his earlier free trade leanings. In 1864, having been persuaded by the Orange Order to stand for the Victorian Parliament, he was elected to the seat of Ballarat East as a supporter of James McCulloch, and was appointed government whip.

Jones' wife died on 3 June 1863, and he remarried on 17 February 1865 to Charlotte Ryan. Appointed literary editor of the Ballarat Evening Post in 1867, he had defected to the Opposition in October 1866 after being disappointed in his hopes for a ministry; he later returned to McCulloch but lost his seat at the 1868 election. During the Darling grant crisis he was re-elected to the parliament, defeating the lands minister William Vale in a ministerial by-election for Ballarat West and joining the opposition to Charles Sladen's government. In July, with McCulloch's return to government, he was appointed commissioner of roads and railways and vice-president of the Board of Lands and Works. He quickly became embroiled in a series of court cases and inquiries resulting from his involvement in corrupt land operations; despite resigning his seat and winning re-election in March 1869, he was expelled from the Assembly in April and re-elected again by his constituents. He lost his seat in 1871 after his support was split by a large field of candidates.

Jones' marriage fell apart in 1872 and after an unsuccessful court case in which he tried to marry Rebecca Einley he travelled to America, where he worked as a journalist and lecturer, living in Utah and Wisconsin. He returned to Victoria in 1881 and attempted to re-enter politics, failing at a by-election for Geelong in 1882 and for Ballarat West at the 1883 election before winning the seat in 1886. Running for Windermere in 1889 he was decisively defeated, losing again in 1892 for East Bourke Boroughs, after which he moved to Western Australia to work as a librarian. He continued his political efforts, running for Fremantle in the first federal election in 1901 with disappointing results. He returned to Ballarat in 1902 and died at Korumburra in 1903.
