= Australian Natives' Association =

Defunct mutual organisation in Australia

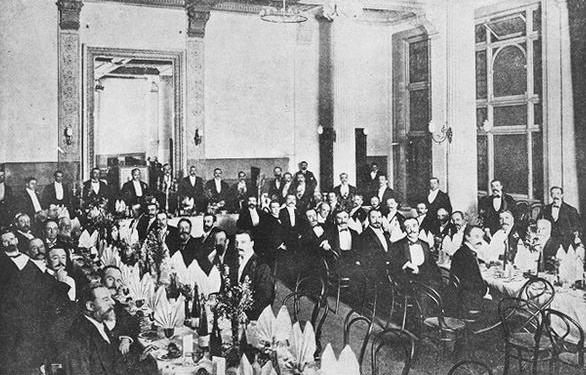
An Australian Natives' Association banquet held in 1901 to honour Prime Minister Edmund Barton, following his return from the United Kingdom

The Australian Natives' Association (ANA) was a mutual society founded in Melbourne, Australia, in April 1871. It was founded by and for the benefit of White native-born Australians, and membership was restricted to that group.

The Association's objectives were to "raise funds by subscription, donations ... for the purpose of relieving sick members, and defraying expenses of funeral of members and their wives, relieving distressed widows and orphans and for the necessary expenses of the general management of the Society."

The organisation had up to 95,000 members and provided benefits to 250,000 people, which were members and their families. While the ANA was legally required to have no affiliation with any political party, it was socially active. It provided strong support for the Federation of Australia, sport, afforestation, social well-being and the Federal Government's restricted immigration policy, later referred to as the White Australia policy. The ANA and Manchester Unity agreed to merge to form Australian Unity in 1990. After the merger, social and educative functions continued in the ANA Fraternal organisation. The last remaining branch of the ANA closed in 2007 in Western Australia.

== Background ==
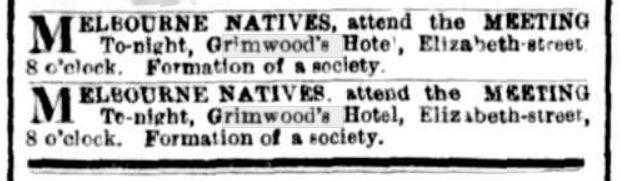
Advertisement, 24 April 1871, that brought about the formation of the ANA

The formation of the Australian Natives Association was a multi-stage process. It comes after the creation of the six Australian colonies, the discovery of significant quantities of gold with the wealth that was brought, and the increasing number of locally born citizens. The initial idea was to form a Friendly Society to provide help in sickness and distress solely for Melbourne-born citizens.

"Melbourne Natives" desirous of forming a society for the protection and promotion of their interests are requested to attend a meeting on Monday evening, 8 o'clock, at Grimwood's Hotel, Elizabeth St. Formation of a Society.

== Victorian Natives' Association ==
The 24 April 1871 meeting had 14 men in attendance, who resolved to form a Friendly Society of Victorian Natives. A committee was established and several committee meetings and another public meeting, registration as a Friendly Society was gained on 4 May 1871. At 5 June meeting, it was agreed the objects were "To promote the social and intellectual improvement of its members".

=== ANA Day ===
Around the end of the 19th century, the Victorian association advocated for a kind of forerunner of what is today Australia Day, to be celebrated on 26 January as a public holiday and the national day. This subsequently became known as ANA Day in Victoria, but was not taken up by the other states until 1935, and renamed Australia Day.

"...What the people celebrate on Australia Day is not the coming into being of the Australian Commonwealth, for that befell on New Year’s Day; and not May 9, when the first Parliament of the Commonwealth commenced its sittings; but January 26, the day in 1788 when the first permanent white settlers, being Captain Arthur Phillip’s officials, marines and transported convicts from England, landed on the shores of Sydney Cove."

== Australian Natives' Association ==
In 1872, it was voted to extend membership to men born in the other Australian colonies and to change the name at the same time. The association started to grow and form new branches initially around Melbourne and then in the golds fields towns of Ballarat and Sandhurst (now Bendigo) in 1874 and Neangor (now Eaglehawk) 1876. In 1878 the Sandhurst branch initiated a motion that the Association allow having debates or essays at the meetings after the business had been completed. The membership population centre of the Association moved to the gold fields towns west of Melbourne as the membership of these branches grew. The administration also moved West with the election of F. C. Wainwright, a member in Ballarat, as General Secretary in 1881. As the Association grew, it was decided in 1890 to move administration back to Melbourne. The Association played a leading role in the movement for Australian federation in the last 20 years of the 19th century. In 1900, it had a membership of 17,000, mainly in Victoria.

The ANA provided sickness, medical, and funeral cover. Membership in the ANA was restricted to men born in Australia, at a time when Australian-born people of European descent (not including Indigenous Australians) were rising to power in place of an older generation born in Britain. In the 1890s, for the first time, the native-born became the majority of the population.

The organisation received criticism for their name, including from Aboriginal leader and activist William Cooper over the appropriation of the term 'native'.

Former Chief President James Hume Cook described as "three great principles" of the A.N.A:

The maintenance of a White Australia.

The Made-in-Australia movement.

The broadening of the Commonwealth Constitution.

== Chief Presidents ==
With the establishment of a growing number of branches, including some outside Melbourne, a conference was held in 1874 to plan for centralised administration of the ANA. From 1877 the ANA was placed under the control of a board of directors to be presided over by a chief president. From 1877 onwards, the ANA elected a chief president at their annual conference held in different cities each year. There were four instances when the conference was not annual and the Chief President served for two years—the first two terms and twice due to the Second World War.

== New Zealand Natives' Association ==
With the 1880 public consideration of Australian colonies and New Zealand federating, there was discussion of forming a New Zealand branch of the ANA. The Victorian ANA Board of Directors considered forming branches in Wellington, Westport, and Auckland, but the legislative hurdles caused by the differing legislation in the two colonies were insurmountable. A separate organisation, the New Zealand Natives Association (NZNA) was formed 30 April 1897. The Wellington branch grew satisfactorily, reaching 245 members within a year. At its peak it reached 2,500 members.

In 1900 while the Australian federation was not to include New Zealand, the New Zealand Natives Association voted to allow Australians to become members. Apart from differing legislation, limitations in communications technologies of the time made thoughts of amalgamating ANA and NZNA impractical. In 1904, the Wellington Branch experienced significant difficulties and despite the offer from Victorian ANA to support it as if it were one of their own branches, the Wellington Branch disbanded in June 1905. The ANA met the deficiency of £8/10/- so all creditors were paid. Over the next twenty or so years, several attempts were made to align the New Zealand branches with the ANA, but all failed.

== Federation ==
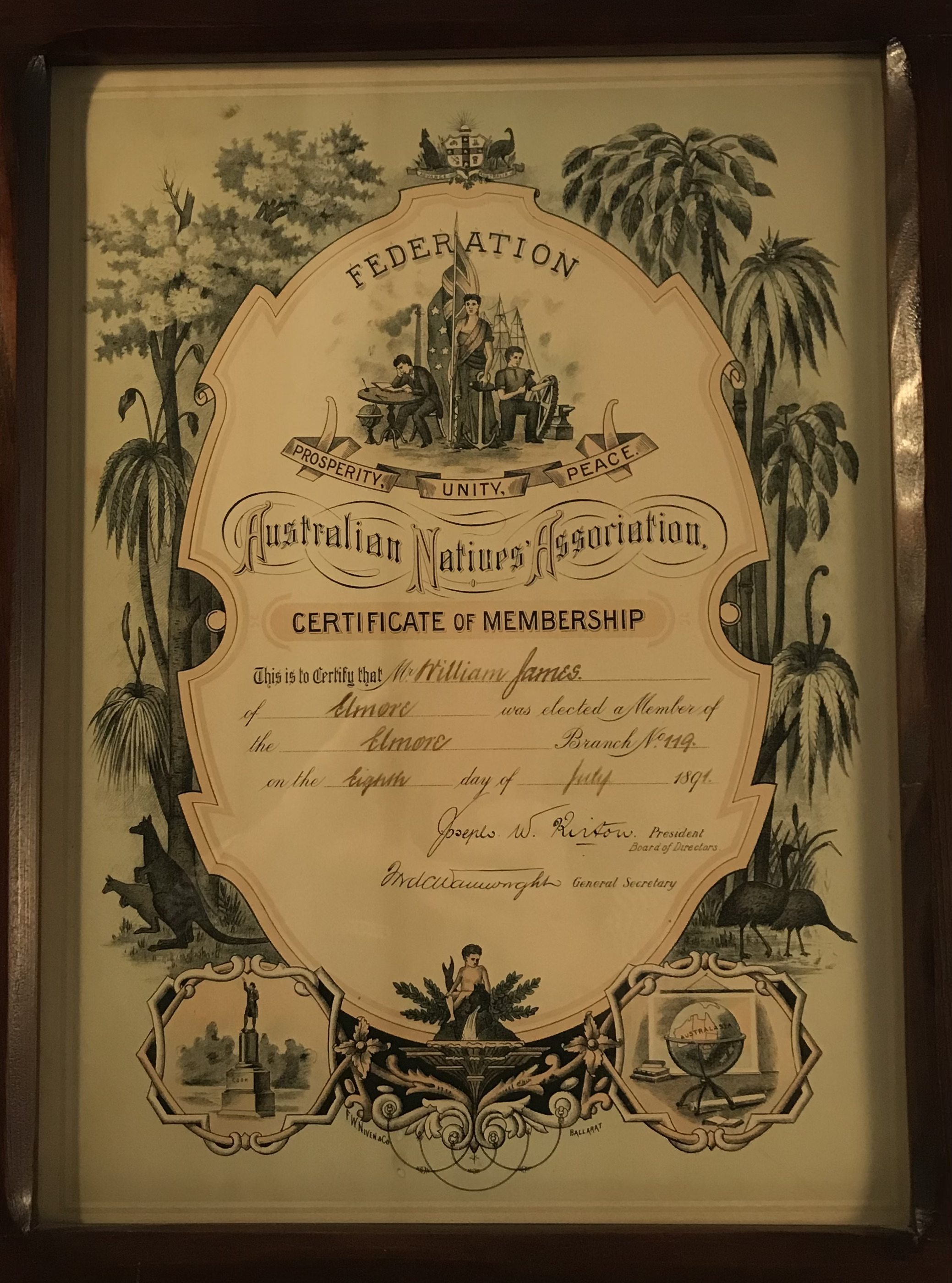
Australian Natives' Association Membership Certificate 1891

In 1885, the ANA committed itself to the federation of the Australian colonies, in response to what was seen as the threat of foreign incursion into the Pacific. The organisation avoided party politics, but they soon adopted the rising liberal politician and ANA member Alfred Deakin as their candidate for leadership of the federal movement. The membership certificate of 1891 shows many of the emblems of the federation such as the Australian Flag, the words Prosperity, Unity, Peace and Federation, a globe of the world showing Australia as a single entity, self-sufficiency through successful industry, and the ANA coat of arms featuring the kangaroo and emu.

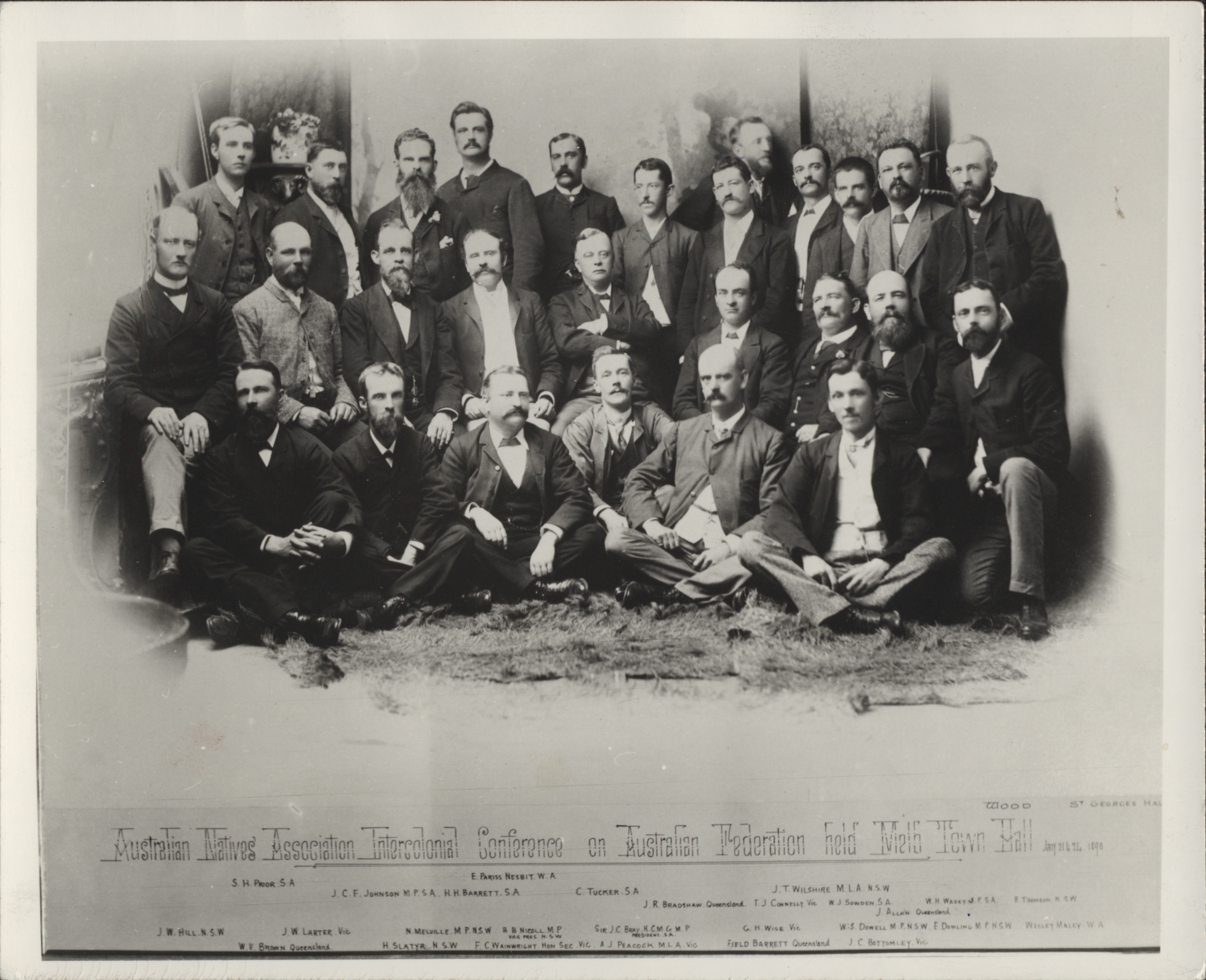
ANA intercolonial conference 1890

In 1891, when the Victorian Parliament was considering the federation bill, the ANA organised public meetings around the colony to rally support for the bill, many of them addressed by Deakin. The ANA continued to campaign following the failure of the 1891 bill. From 1893 the association provided much of the organisational and financial support for the Federation Leagues which led the campaign, particularly in Victoria. When the movement revived after 1897, the ANA campaigned for the referendums to approve the proposed constitution. With federation achieved in 1901, the ANA withdrew from political activity, although it continued other activities such as promoting the observance of Australia Day. Other national issues supported by the ANA included afforestation, an Australian-made goods policy, water conservation, and the celebration of 'proper and meaningful' citizenship ceremonies following the increased levels of migration after World War II. The ANA also supported the adoption of the wattle as Australia's patriotic symbol, included in the coat of arms of Australia in 1912.

== Culture ==
In the late 1880s, an ANA-sponsored literary and musical competition was mooted by several Victorian branches, along the lines of that run by the South Street Society and, like that organisation, originating in Ballarat, there the first such event took place on Foundation Day, 26 January 1892; Calder Smith and C. R. Church being among those credited with its successful launch, with Ballarat's Star newspaper a strong supporter. The literary competition was dropped early, but the vocal competitions were prominent in Australia's cultural calendar for over thirty years. In 1927 the 38th, and final, ANA musical and elocutionary competitions were held in Melbourne.

Between 1897 and 1919, the ANA published the monthly "The Advance Australia" magazine.

== Female membership ==
The ANA was wary of admitting female members, on the basis that at the time males were predominately the primary income earners. At the 1896 Daylesford Conference, the Clifton Hill branch presented a motion instructing the Board to take steps for form a Friendly Society similar to the ANA for Australian-born females. At the 1897 Castlemaine Conference, a detailed report was provided that showed:

- 168,757 native born women between the age of 15 and 40 years;
- an estimate of 109,000 women eligible to join a Society was given.

A motion to allow women to join the ANA was defeated.

The 1899 Port Fairy Conference heard that between the 1871 and 1891 censuses, female primary income earners had increased from 52,243 to 114,804. In November 1899 the Board supported the creation of a Friendly Society for women. In August 1900, the Constitution and Bye Laws for the society were approved, and then registered in September.

In November 1900, the Australasian Women's Association (AWA) was formed. The ANA absorbed all the expenses of setting up the Association. The ANA and AWA worked closely together and at times jointly published document listing key office holder.

The changing circumstances after WW2 and the greater involvement of the Federal Government in providing social supports started to challenge Friendly Societies including the AWA. In 1955, the ANA began taking steps to enable AWA members to transfer to the ANA, and this came to fruition in 1964. A past AWA Chief President, Mrs. I. V. Meagher, became the first woman Chief President of the ANA in 1977.

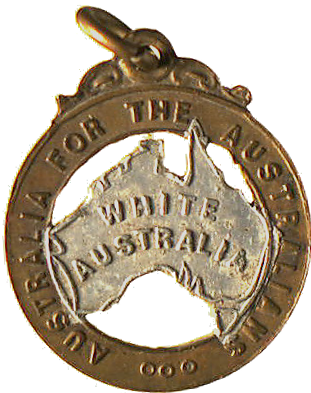
1910 badge produced by the ANA, showing the use of the slogan "White Australia"

== White Australia policy ==
Alongside the Returned and Services League, the ANA was one of the last Australian groups to support the White Australia Policy. While this policy was wound down in the decades after the Second World War and totally abolished by 1970, a few members continued to support it until the 1970s.

== Later years ==
The ANA continued to operate a private health fund, a building society, general insurance company and small-scale life insurance and fund management activities. In 1993, it merged those operations with Manchester Unity IOOF of Victoria to create Australian Unity, the largest friendly society in Australia by number of members.

In 2007, the Mosman Park WA Branch of the ANA closed down; the building owned by the chapter was sold, and the proceeds distributed among the group's remaining 320 members.

== New Australian Natives' Association ==
In 2018, an organisation also called the Australian Natives Association was established in Canberra, with incorporated branches later opening in Victoria and Brisbane. The new ANA advocates for an ethnonationalist conception of the Australian identity, arguing that Australia is "inseparable" from its "English-speaking European descent" colonisers, and that an Aboriginal therefore cannot be an Australian.

It has been classified by the Global Project Against Hate and Extremism (GPAHE) as a far-right hate and extremist group, with an anti-immigrant, white nationalist and anti-woman ideology.

== Notable members ==
- Edmund Barton, Member of Parliament for Hunter (1901–1903); Prime Minister of Australia (1901–1903).
- Alfred Deakin, Member of Parliament for Ballaarat (1901–1913); Prime Minister of Australia (1903–1904, 1905–1908, 1909–1910).
- Charles McGrath, Member of Parliament for Ballaarat (1913–1919, 1920–1934).
- Alexander Peacock, Speaker of the Victorian Legislative Assembly (1928–1933); Premier of Victoria (1901–1902, 1914–1917, 1924).
- T. J. Ryan, Member of the Queensland Parliament for Barcoo (1909–1919); Premier of Queensland (1915–1919).
- Carty Salmon, Member of Parliament for Laanecoorie (1901–1913) and the Grampians (1915–1917); Speaker of the House of Representatives (1909–1910).
- George Turner, Premier of Victoria (1894–1899, 1900–1901); Treasurer of Australia (1901–1904, 1904–1905).

== Bibliography ==
- "Australian Natives' Association". National Museum of Australia. 13 April 2018.
- "Australian Unity | Company History". Archived from the original on 8 March 2005. "Australian Unity, formerly known as Australian Unity Friendly Society Limited, was formed in September 1993, when two long established organisations merged; the Australian Natives' Association Friendly Society (ANA) and Manchester Unity Independent Order of Oddfellows in Victoria Friendly Society"
- Gregory, Alan (1988). "Sir Alexander James Peacock (1861–1933)". Australian Dictionary of Biography. Vol. 11. Melbourne University Press.
- Kelleher, Bryan J. (compiler). Australian poetry and the Australian Natives' Association (South Melbourne: Australian Natives' Association, 1983)
- Livingston, Kevin T.; Jordan, Richard; Sweely, Gay, eds. (2001). Becoming Australians: The Movement Towards Federation in Ballarat and the Nation. Wakefield Press. ISBN 1-86254-520-0.
- Menadue, J. E. (1971). A Centenary History of the Australian Natives' Association 1871–1971. Horticultural Press Pty Ltd. ISBN 978-09599-6910-8.
- Murphy, D. J.; Joyce, R. B.; Hughes, Colin A., eds. (1970). Prelude to Power: The Rise of the Labour Party in Queensland 1885–1915. The Jacaranda Press. ISBN 978-07016-0312-0.
- Murphy, D. J. (1975). TJ Ryan: A Political Biography. University of Queensland Press. ISBN 0-7022-2289-5.
- Serle, Geoffrey (1990). "Sir George Turner (1851–1916)". Australian Dictionary of Biography | Sir George Turner (1851–1916). Vol. 12. Melbourne University Press.
- Wilks, Stephen, ed. (May 2023). 'Order, Order!': A Biographical Dictionary of Speakers, Deputy Speakers and Clerks of the Australian House of Representatives. ANU Press. doi:10.22459/OO.2023. ISBN 978-17604-6575-9.
