= Electoral results for the Division of Werriwa =

Australian division election results

This is a list of electoral results for the Division of Werriwa in Australian federal elections from the division's creation in 1901 until the present.

== Members ==
Member	Party	Term
Alfred Conroy	Free Trade, Anti-Socialist	1901–1906
David Hall	Labor	1906–1912
Benjamin Bennett	Labor	1912 by–1913
Alfred Conroy	Liberal	1913–1914
John Lynch	Labor	1914–1916
John Lynch	Nationalist	1916–1919
Bert Lazzarini	Labor	1919–1931
Bert Lazzarini	Labor (NSW)	1931–1931
Walter McNicoll	Country	1931–1934
Bert Lazzarini	Labor (NSW)	1934–1936
Bert Lazzarini	Labor	1936–1952
Gough Whitlam	Labor	1952 by–1978
John Kerin	Labor	1978 by–1994
Mark Latham	Labor	1994–2005
Chris Hayes	Labor	2005 by–2010
Laurie Ferguson	Labor	2010–2016
Anne Stanley	Labor	2016–present

== Election results ==
=== Elections in the 2020s ===
==== 2025 ====
2025 Australian federal election: Werriwa
Party	Candidate	Votes	%	±%
Labor	Anne Stanley	35,785	40.84	+1.71
Liberal	Sam Kayal	27,003	30.82	−0.08
Greens	Janet Castle	9,747	11.12	+4.48
One Nation	Ian Cimera	3,499	3.99	−0.99
Legalise Cannabis	Andrew Murphy	3,005	3.43	+3.43
Libertarian	Gemma Noiosi	2,802	3.20	−5.92
Independent	Jamal Daoud	2,232	2.55	+2.55
Trumpet of Patriots	Shannon McGlone	1,800	2.05	+2.05
Family First	Jacob Balestri	1,741	1.99	+1.99
Total formal votes		87,614	82.74	−7.08
Informal votes		18,274	17.26	+7.08
Turnout		105,888	89.90	+7.39
Two-party-preferred result
Labor	Anne Stanley	49,741	56.77	+1.43
Liberal	Sam Kayal	37,873	43.23	−1.43
Labor hold		Swing	+1.43	

==== 2022 ====
2022 Australian federal election: Werriwa
Party	Candidate	Votes	%	±%
Labor	Anne Stanley	40,108	39.86	−7.90
Liberal	Sam Kayal	30,864	30.67	−4.60
Liberal Democrats	Victor Tey	8,978	8.92	+8.92
United Australia	Tony Nikolic	8,813	8.76	+4.56
Greens	Apurva Shukla	6,772	6.73	+1.36
One Nation	Adam Booke	5,096	5.06	+5.06
Total formal votes		100,631	90.18	+1.75
Informal votes		10,962	9.82	−1.75
Turnout		111,593	88.53	−2.00
Two-party-preferred result
Labor	Anne Stanley	56,173	55.82	+0.35
Liberal	Sam Kayal	44,458	44.18	−0.35
Labor hold		Swing	+0.35	

Alluvial diagram for preference flows in the seat of Werriwa in the 2022 federal election. indicates at what stage the winning candidate had over 50% of the votes and was declared the winner.

=== Elections in the 2010s ===
==== 2019 ====
2019 Australian federal election: Werriwa
Party	Candidate	Votes	%	±%
Labor	Anne Stanley	45,002	47.76	−4.38
Liberal	Shayne Miller	33,234	35.27	−1.29
Greens	Signe Westerberg	5,060	5.37	+0.77
Christian Democrats	Narelle Storey	4,841	5.14	−1.56
United Australia	Ignatios Tsiriplis	3,957	4.20	+4.20
Independent	Michael White	2,135	2.27	+2.27
Total formal votes		94,229	88.43	−2.81
Informal votes		12,324	11.57	+2.81
Turnout		106,553	90.53	+0.31
Two-party-preferred result
Labor	Anne Stanley	52,270	55.47	−2.73
Liberal	Shayne Miller	41,959	44.53	+2.73
Labor hold		Swing	−2.73	

==== 2016 ====
2016 Australian federal election: Werriwa
Party	Candidate	Votes	%	±%
Labor	Anne Stanley	46,596	52.14	+2.81
Liberal	Ned Mannoun	32,670	36.56	+0.51
Christian Democrats	Daniel Edwards	5,986	6.70	+2.49
Greens	Signe Westerberg	4,109	4.60	+1.36
Total formal votes		89,361	91.24	+4.88
Informal votes		8,581	8.76	−4.88
Turnout		97,942	90.22	+1.77
Two-party-preferred result
Labor	Anne Stanley	52,005	58.20	+1.67
Liberal	Ned Mannoun	37,356	41.80	−1.67
Labor hold		Swing	+1.67	

==== 2013 ====
2013 Australian federal election: Werriwa
Party	Candidate	Votes	%	±%
Labor	Laurie Ferguson	34,117	44.09	−4.48
Liberal	Kent Johns	30,693	39.67	+0.95
Palmer United	Katryna Thirup	3,363	4.35	+4.35
Christian Democrats	John Ramsay	2,936	3.79	+3.79
Greens	Daniel Griffiths	2,532	3.27	−9.43
Democratic Labour	Michael Byrne	1,562	2.02	+2.02
One Nation	Marella Harris	1,519	1.96	+1.96
Katter's Australian	Kerryn Ball	657	0.85	+0.85
Total formal votes		77,379	87.13	−2.52
Informal votes		11,433	12.87	+2.52
Turnout		88,812	92.46	+0.11
Two-party-preferred result
Labor	Laurie Ferguson	40,426	52.24	−4.51
Liberal	Kent Johns	36,953	47.76	+4.51
Labor hold		Swing	−4.51	

==== 2010 ====
2010 Australian federal election: Werriwa
Party	Candidate	Votes	%	±%
Labor	Laurie Ferguson	36,582	48.57	−10.13
Liberal	Sam Eskaros	29,165	38.72	+8.33
Greens	Lauren Moore	9,567	12.70	+8.87
Total formal votes		75,314	89.65	−3.77
Informal votes		8,692	10.35	+3.77
Turnout		84,006	92.32	−1.58
Two-party-preferred result
Labor	Laurie Ferguson	42,740	56.75	−8.32
Liberal	Sam Eskaros	32,574	43.25	+8.32
Labor hold		Swing	−8.32	

=== Elections in the 2000s ===
==== 2007 ====
2007 Australian federal election: Werriwa
Party	Candidate	Votes	%	±%
Labor	Chris Hayes	46,892	58.83	+8.92
Liberal	Rachel Elliott	24,046	30.17	−7.44
Greens	Neerav Bhatt	3,022	3.79	+0.07
Independent	Joe Bryant	2,016	2.53	+2.53
Family First	Andrew Mills	1,920	2.41	+2.00
Christian Democrats	Hany Gayed	1,814	2.28	+1.90
Total formal votes		79,710	93.47	+1.45
Informal votes		5,569	6.53	−1.45
Turnout		85,279	94.43	+1.10
Two-party-preferred result
Labor	Chris Hayes	51,999	65.24	+8.30
Liberal	Rachel Elliott	27,711	34.76	−8.30
Labor hold		Swing	+8.30	

==== 2005 by-election ====
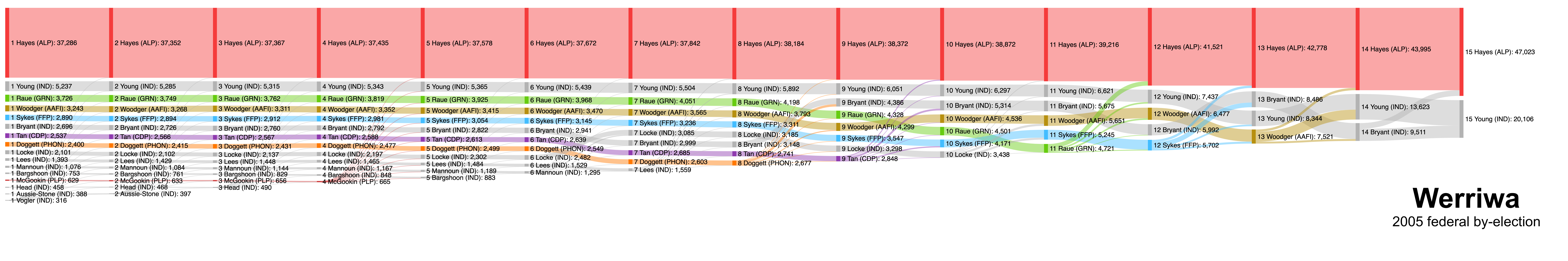
The distribution of preferences in the by-election resulted in the election of Chris Hayes.

The by-election, as largely expected in the absence of a Liberal candidate, resulted in an easy victory for Labor candidate Chris Hayes. Hayes polled 55.5% of the primary vote, with his nearest challenger being independent Liberal Young on 7.8%, ahead of Green Raue on 5.5%. Locke, despite some predictions of an upset victory, polled only 3.1%. Hayes was able to claim victory on the day of the by-election, and was subsequently sworn in as a member of the Australian House of Representatives. Steven Chaytor, who had stepped aside for Hayes in preselection, later served as a member of the New South Wales Legislative Assembly from 2005 to 2007.

2005 Werriwa by-election
Party	Candidate	Votes	%	±%
Labor	Chris Hayes	37,286	55.54	+2.90
Independent Liberal	James Young	5,237	7.80	+7.80
Greens	Ben Raue	3,726	5.55	+2.42
AAFI	Janey Woodger	3,243	4.83	+4.83
Family First	Mick Sykes	2,890	4.31	+4.31
Independent Liberal	Joe Bryant	2,696	4.02	+4.02
Christian Democrats	Greg Tan	2,536	3.78	+3.78
One Nation	Charles Doggett	2,400	3.48	+1.22
People Power	Deborah Locke	2,101	3.13	+3.13
Independent	Mal Lees	1,393	2.08	+2.08
	Ned Mannoun	1,076	1.60	+1.60
Independent	Sam Bargshoon	753	1.12	−3.75
Progressive Labour	Mary Patricia McGookin	629	0.94	+0.94
Socialist Equality	Mike Head	458	0.68	+0.04
Independent	Marc Aussie-Stone	388	0.58	+0.58
Independent	Robert Vogler	316	0.47	+0.47
Total formal votes		67,129	86.85	−5.17
Informal votes		10,162	13.15	+5.17
Turnout		77,291	85.19	−8.73
Two-candidate-preferred result
Labor	Chris Hayes	47,023	70.05	+10.74
Independent Liberal	James Young	20,106	29.95	+29.95
Labor hold		Swing	N/A	

==== 2004 ====
2004 Australian federal election: Werriwa
Party	Candidate	Votes	%	±%
Labor	Mark Latham	40,837	52.64	+2.31
Liberal	Michael Medway	27,241	35.11	+1.79
Independent	Sam Bargshoon	3,779	4.87	+4.87
Greens	Ben Raue	2,432	3.13	+0.48
One Nation	Charles Doggett	1,831	2.36	−2.36
Democrats	Patrick Briscoe-Hough	965	1.24	−1.40
	Mike Head	497	0.64	+0.64
Total formal votes		77,582	92.02	+0.53
Informal votes		6,724	7.98	−0.53
Turnout		84,306	93.92	−0.05
Two-party-preferred result
Labor	Mark Latham	46,012	59.31	+0.82
Liberal	Michael Medway	31,570	40.69	−0.82
Labor hold		Swing	+0.82	

==== 2001 ====
2001 Australian federal election: Werriwa
Party	Candidate	Votes	%	±%
Labor	Mark Latham	35,980	50.33	−1.15
Liberal	Paul Masina	23,816	33.32	+4.24
One Nation	P. Kotarski	3,372	4.72	−6.16
Greens	Roger Barsony	1,891	2.65	+0.87
Democrats	Glenda Blanch	1,886	2.64	−0.79
Christian Democrats	Greg Tan	1,759	2.46	+2.46
Unity	John Uri	1,527	2.14	−0.04
AAFI	Janey Woodger	1,256	1.76	+1.76
Total formal votes		71,487	91.49	−3.32
Informal votes		6,651	8.51	+3.32
Turnout		78,138	94.47	
Two-party-preferred result
Labor	Mark Latham	41,810	58.49	−4.13
Liberal	Paul Masina	29,677	41.51	+4.13
Labor hold		Swing	−4.13	

=== Elections in the 1990s ===
==== 1998 ====
1998 Australian federal election: Werriwa
Party	Candidate	Votes	%	±%
Labor	Mark Latham	37,106	50.58	+2.69
Liberal	Andrew Thorn	21,251	28.97	−4.74
One Nation	John Hyslop	8,440	11.51	+11.51
Democrats	James Cockayne	2,594	3.54	−2.90
Greens	Vicki Kearney	1,605	2.19	+2.19
Independent	Sharynne Freeman	1,260	1.72	+1.72
Unity	Ibrahim Peck	1,099	1.50	+1.50
Total formal votes		73,355	95.12	+0.20
Informal votes		3,766	4.88	−0.20
Turnout		77,121	94.54	−1.28
Two-party-preferred result
Labor	Mark Latham	45,974	62.67	+6.46
Liberal	Andrew Thorn	27,381	37.33	−6.46
Labor hold		Swing	+6.46	

==== 1996 ====
1996 Australian federal election: Werriwa
Party	Candidate	Votes	%	±%
Labor	Mark Latham	33,800	47.90	−13.51
Liberal	Andrew Thorn	23,790	33.71	+3.22
Democrats	Emanuela Lang	4,541	6.44	+1.47
AAFI	Vince Townsend	3,973	5.63	+5.63
Independent	James Whitehall	2,722	3.86	+3.86
Reclaim Australia	Edwin Woodger	1,169	1.66	+1.66
	Greg Josling	571	0.81	+0.81
Total formal votes		70,566	94.91	−1.09
Informal votes		3,782	5.09	+1.09
Turnout		74,348	95.82	+0.52
Two-party-preferred result
Labor	Mark Latham	39,489	56.21	−9.56
Liberal	Andrew Thorn	30,761	43.79	+9.56
Labor hold		Swing	−9.56	

==== 1994 by-election ====
1994 Werriwa by-election
Party	Candidate	Votes	%	±%
Labor	Mark Latham	30,337	50.13	−11.27
Liberal	Charlie Lynn	20,466	33.82	+3.52
AAFI	Robyn Spencer	4,384	7.24	+7.24
Independent	Julia Moon	3,199	5.29	+5.29
	Graeme MacAllister	1,111	1.84	+1.84
Independent	Maxwill Corbett	458	0.76	+0.76
Independent	Alex Kammoun	378	0.62	+0.62
Independent	Earle Keegel	188	0.31	+0.31
Total formal votes		60,521	94.80	−1.20
Informal votes		3,318	5.20	+1.20
Turnout		63,839	85.64	−9.66
Two-party-preferred result
Labor	Mark Latham	35,972	59.49	−6.28
Liberal	Charlie Lynn	24,500	40.51	+6.28
Labor hold		Swing	−6.28	

==== 1993 ====
1993 Australian federal election: Werriwa
Party	Candidate	Votes	%	±%
Labor	John Kerin	41,725	61.40	+9.23
Liberal	Rick Lewis	20,722	30.50	+0.48
Democrats	Peter Fraser	3,376	4.97	−5.31
Natural Law	Julie Chamberlain	2,129	3.13	+3.13
Total formal votes		67,952	96.00	−0.30
Informal votes		2,830	4.00	+0.30
Turnout		70,782	95.30	
Two-party-preferred result
Labor	John Kerin	44,671	65.77	+1.69
Liberal	Rick Lewis	23,250	34.23	−1.69
Labor hold		Swing	+1.69	

==== 1990 ====
1990 Australian federal election: Werriwa
Party	Candidate	Votes	%	±%
Labor	John Kerin	38,392	52.0	−11.7
Liberal	Rick Lewis	22,200	30.0	−6.3
Democrats	Eamon Quinn	7,547	10.2	+10.2
Environment Inds	Sue Dobson	4,866	6.6	+6.6
Australian Gruen	Robert Tomasiello	886	1.2	+1.2
Total formal votes		73,891	96.3	
Informal votes		2,801	3.7	
Turnout		76,692	94.9	
Two-party-preferred result
Labor	John Kerin	47,190	64.0	+0.3
Liberal	Rick Lewis	26,546	36.0	−0.3
Labor hold		Swing	+0.3	

=== Elections in the 1980s ===
==== 1987 ====
1987 Australian federal election: Werriwa
Party	Candidate	Votes	%	±%
Labor	John Kerin	43,094	63.7	+0.0
Liberal	David Brock	24,600	36.3	+7.0
Total formal votes		67,694	94.7	
Informal votes		3,798	5.3	
Turnout		71,492	95.3	
Labor hold		Swing	−3.2	

==== 1984 ====
1984 Australian federal election: Werriwa
Party	Candidate	Votes	%	±%
Labor	John Kerin	36,892	63.7	+3.6
Liberal	Peter Swiderski	16,963	29.3	−2.1
Democrats	Valerie George	4,079	7.0	+7.0
Total formal votes		57,934	92.1	
Informal votes		5,002	7.9	
Turnout		62,936	93.5	
Two-party-preferred result
Labor	John Kerin	38,737	66.9	−0.9
Liberal	Peter Swiderski	19,195	33.1	+0.9
Labor hold		Swing	−0.9	

==== 1983 ====
1983 Australian federal election: Werriwa
Party	Candidate	Votes	%	±%
Labor	John Kerin	52,584	63.2	+5.3
Liberal	Marie Rutledge	23,586	28.3	−2.1
Independent	David Brandon	4,714	5.7	+5.7
Socialist Labour	Dorothea Brocksop	1,351	1.6	+1.6
Socialist Workers	Gail Cumming	1,025	1.2	+1.2
Total formal votes		83,260	97.0	
Informal votes		2,584	3.0	
Turnout		85,844	94.4	
Two-party-preferred result
Labor	John Kerin		69.1	+2.5
Liberal	Marie Rutledge		30.9	−2.5
Labor hold		Swing	+2.5	

==== 1980 ====
1980 Australian federal election: Werriwa
Party	Candidate	Votes	%	±%
Labor	John Kerin	45,296	57.9	+2.4
Liberal	Marie Rutledge	23,813	30.4	−3.5
Democrats	Keith Olson	5,074	6.5	−2.5
Independent	Edward Bell	4,079	5.2	+5.2
Total formal votes		78,262	96.8	
Informal votes		2,577	3.2	
Turnout		80,839	95.0	
Two-party-preferred result
Labor	John Kerin		66.6	+6.4
Liberal	Marie Rutledge		33.4	−6.4
Labor hold		Swing	+6.4	

=== Elections in the 1970s ===
==== 1978 by-election ====
1978 Werriwa by-election
Party	Candidate	Votes	%	±%
Labor	John Kerin	40,272	67.2	+11.7
Liberal	William Sadler	14,566	24.3	−9.6
Democrats	Keith Olson	3,774	6.3	−2.7
Socialist Workers	John Garcia	1,081	1.8	+1.8
New Australian	Hans Penninger	214	0.4	+0.4
Total formal votes		59,897	98.2	
Informal votes		1,093	1.8	
Turnout		60,990	81.7	
Two-party-preferred result
Labor	John Kerin		72.3	+12.1
Liberal	William Sadler		27.7	−12.1
Labor hold		Swing	+12.1	

==== 1977 ====
1977 Australian federal election: Werriwa
Party	Candidate	Votes	%	±%
Labor	Gough Whitlam	37,262	55.5	−0.7
Liberal	Jonas Abromas	22,787	33.9	−6.4
Democrats	Keith Olson	6,035	9.0	+9.0
Independent	Ross May	1,079	1.6	+1.6
Total formal votes		67,163	96.7	
Informal votes		2,205	3.2	
Turnout		69,368	95.5	
Two-party-preferred result
Labor	Gough Whitlam		60.2	+2.0
Liberal	Jonas Abromas		39.8	−2.0
Labor hold		Swing	+2.0	

==== 1975 ====
1975 Australian federal election: Werriwa
Party	Candidate	Votes	%	±%
Labor	Gough Whitlam	44,356	59.4	−9.6
Liberal	William Sadler	27,724	37.1	+7.9
Independent	Marc Aussie-Stone	1,178	1.6	+1.6
Workers	Ronald Watson	578	0.8	+0.8
Independent	Maurice Sharp	271	0.4	+0.4
Independent	Fredrick Keep	270	0.4	+0.4
Independent	Ross May	263	0.4	+0.4
Total formal votes		74,640	97.1	
Informal votes		2,266	2.9	
Turnout		76,906	95.4	
Two-party-preferred result
Labor	Gough Whitlam		61.4	−8.5
Liberal	William Sadler		38.6	+8.5
Labor hold		Swing	−8.5	

==== 1974 ====
1974 Australian federal election: Werriwa
Party	Candidate	Votes	%	±%
Labor	Gough Whitlam	46,844	69.0	+0.1
Liberal	Michael Darby	19,822	29.2	+1.1
Australia	Robert Tuckwell	360	0.5	+0.5
Independent	Margaret Tomkins	221	0.3	+0.3
Independent	Maurice Sharp	152	0.2	+0.2
Independent	Robert Demkiw	98	0.1	+0.1
Independent	Steve Dodd	97	0.1	+0.1
National Socialist	Ross May	82	0.1	+0.1
Independent	Ian Robertson	78	0.1	+0.1
Independent	Eileen Eason	73	0.1	+0.1
Independent	Leslie Shaw	42	0.1	+0.1
Independent	Veljko Prlja	35	0.1	+0.1
Total formal votes		67,904	97.5	
Informal votes		1,715	2.5	
Turnout		69,619	96.0	
Two-party-preferred result
Labor	Gough Whitlam		69.9	+0.0
Liberal	Michael Darby		30.1	+0.0
Labor hold		Swing	+0.0	

==== 1972 ====
1972 Australian federal election: Werriwa
Party	Candidate	Votes	%	±%
Labor	Gough Whitlam	41,297	68.9	+7.7
Liberal	Ron Dunbier	16,822	28.1	−1.0
Democratic Labor	Andrew Murphy	1,139	1.9	−3.2
Independent	Walter Turner	380	0.6	+0.6
Independent	Maurice Sharp	331	0.6	+0.6
Total formal votes		59,969	97.2	
Informal votes		1,731	2.8	
Turnout		61,700	95.5	
Two-party-preferred result
Labor	Gough Whitlam		69.9	+5.2
Liberal	Ron Dunbier		30.1	−5.2
Labor hold		Swing	+5.2	

=== Elections in the 1960s ===
==== 1969 ====
1969 Australian federal election: Werriwa
Party	Candidate	Votes	%	±%
Labor	Gough Whitlam	32,435	61.2	+8.1
Liberal	Christopher May	15,416	29.1	−9.4
Democratic Labor	William Arundel	2,680	5.1	+2.0
Independent	Fay McCallum	1,088	2.1	+2.1
Independent	William Sadler	1,021	1.9	+1.9
Communist	Don Syme	377	0.7	+0.7
Total formal votes		53,017	95.6	
Informal votes		2,427	4.4	
Turnout		55,444	94.2	
Two-party-preferred result
Labor	Gough Whitlam		64.7	+7.1
Liberal	Christopher May		35.3	−7.1
Labor hold		Swing	+7.1	

==== 1966 ====
1966 Australian federal election: Werriwa
Party	Candidate	Votes	%	±%
Labor	Gough Whitlam	45,345	55.0	−3.1
Liberal	Elga Rodze	30,198	36.6	−0.7
Communist	Les Kelton	4,411	5.3	+5.3
Democratic Labor	Andrew Murphy	2,539	3.1	−1.5
Total formal votes		82,493	94.9	
Informal votes		4,396	5.1	
Turnout		86,889	94.6	
Two-party-preferred result
Labor	Gough Whitlam		59.5	+0.5
Liberal	Elga Rodze		40.5	−0.5
Labor hold		Swing	+0.5	

==== 1963 ====
1963 Australian federal election: Werriwa
Party	Candidate	Votes	%	±%
Labor	Gough Whitlam	39,440	58.1	−7.2
Liberal	Kevin Byrne	25,301	37.3	+11.2
Democratic Labor	Harry Cole	3,115	4.6	−4.1
Total formal votes		67,856	97.4	
Informal votes		1,803	2.6	
Turnout		69,659	94.9	
Two-party-preferred result
Labor	Gough Whitlam		59.0	−7.8
Liberal	Kevin Byrne		41.0	+7.8
Labor hold		Swing	−7.8	

==== 1961 ====
1961 Australian federal election: Werriwa
Party	Candidate	Votes	%	±%
Labor	Gough Whitlam	36,153	65.3	+8.9
Liberal	Vernon Luckman	14,427	26.1	−6.6
Democratic Labor	Kevin Davis	4,792	8.7	−2.3
Total formal votes		55,372	96.3	
Informal votes		2,119	3.7	
Turnout		57,491	94.5	
Two-party-preferred result
Labor	Gough Whitlam		66.8	+8.4
Liberal	Vernon Luckman		33.2	−8.4
Labor hold		Swing	+8.4	

=== Elections in the 1950s ===
==== 1958 ====
1958 Australian federal election: Werriwa
Party	Candidate	Votes	%	±%
Labor	Gough Whitlam	26,241	56.4	+0.0
Liberal	John Shannon	15,199	32.7	−10.9
Democratic Labor	Les Hale	5,100	11.0	+2.0
Total formal votes		46,540	96.1	
Informal votes		1,889	3.9	
Turnout		48,429	95.0	
Two-party-preferred result
Labor	Gough Whitlam		58.4	+2.0
Liberal	John Shannon		41.6	−2.0
Labor hold		Swing	+2.0	

==== 1955 ====
1955 Australian federal election: Werriwa
Party	Candidate	Votes	%	±%
Labor	Gough Whitlam	21,903	56.4	−3.2
Liberal	John Shannon	16,921	43.6	+6.6
Total formal votes		38,824	95.9	
Informal votes		1,647	4.1	
Turnout		40,471	94.5	
Labor hold		Swing	−4.9	

==== 1954 ====
1954 Australian federal election: Werriwa
Party	Candidate	Votes	%	±%
Labor	Gough Whitlam	33,961	57.7	+2.6
Liberal	Jack Lee	22,530	38.3	−6.6
Communist	Edwin Lipscombe	2,363	4.0	+4.0
Total formal votes		58,854	98.4	
Informal votes		943	1.6	
Turnout		59,797	95.5	
Two-party-preferred result
Labor	Gough Whitlam		61.3	+6.2
Liberal	Jack Lee		38.7	−6.2
Labor hold		Swing	+6.2	

==== 1952 by-election ====
1952 Werriwa by-election
Party	Candidate	Votes	%	±%
Labor	Gough Whitlam	32,561	67.5	+12.4
Liberal	Ian Griffith	15,706	32.5	−12.4
Total formal votes		48,267	98.3	+0.6
Informal votes		826	1.7	−0.6
Turnout		49,093	88.5	−7.1
Labor hold		Swing	+12.4	

==== 1951 ====
1951 Australian federal election: Werriwa
Party	Candidate	Votes	%	±%
Labor	Bert Lazzarini	26,104	55.1	−1.1
Liberal	Ian Griffith	21,257	44.9	+1.1
Total formal votes		47,361	97.7	
Informal votes		1,114	2.3	
Turnout		48,475	95.6	
Labor hold		Swing	−1.1	

=== Elections in the 1940s ===
==== 1949 ====
1949 Australian federal election: Werriwa
Party	Candidate	Votes	%	±%
Labor	Bert Lazzarini	24,142	56.2	+1.6
Liberal	Ray Watson	18,787	43.8	+6.5
Total formal votes		42,929	97.8	
Informal votes		961	2.2	
Turnout		43,890	95.2	
Labor hold		Swing	−6.0	

==== 1946 ====
1946 Australian federal election: Werriwa
Party	Candidate	Votes	%	±%
Labor	Bert Lazzarini	39,408	54.0	−14.7
Liberal	Ray Watson	26,993	37.0	+37.0
Communist	Les Mullin	6,511	8.9	+8.9
Total formal votes		72,912	98.0	
Informal votes		1,478	2.0	
Turnout		74,390	94.9	
Two-party-preferred result
Labor	Bert Lazzarini		62.1	−12.6
Liberal	Ray Watson		37.9	+37.9
Labor hold		Swing	−12.6	

==== 1943 ====
1943 Australian federal election: Werriwa
Party	Candidate	Votes	%	±%
Labor	Bert Lazzarini	46,346	68.7	+27.2
One Parliament	Arthur Brown	12,996	19.3	+19.3
Independent	Michel Kartzoff	8,122	12.0	+12.0
Total formal votes		67,464	97.8	
Informal votes		1,520	2.2	
Turnout		68,984	95.3	
Two-candidate-preferred result
Labor	Bert Lazzarini		74.7	+9.6
One Parliament	Arthur Brown		25.3	+25.3
Labor hold		Swing	+9.6	

==== 1940 ====
1940 Australian federal election: Werriwa
Party	Candidate	Votes	%	±%
Labor	Bert Lazzarini	24,766	41.5	−13.8
United Australia	Charles Hardwick	7,954	13.3	−9.3
State Labor	Rex Connor	7,512	12.6	+12.6
Labor (N-C)	Con Quilkey	6,301	10.6	+10.6
United Australia	Walter Duncan	6,010	10.1	+10.1
United Australia	Lyell Scott	4,170	7.0	+7.0
United Australia	Joseph Worland	2,278	3.8	+3.8
United Australia	Mont Sheppard	731	1.2	+1.2
Total formal votes		59,722	94.8	
Informal votes		3,277	5.2	
Turnout		62,999	94.3	
Two-party-preferred result
Labor	Bert Lazzarini		65.1	+9.8
United Australia	Charles Hardwick		34.9	−9.8
Labor hold		Swing	+9.8	

=== Elections in the 1930s ===
==== 1937 ====
1937 Australian federal election: Werriwa
Party	Candidate	Votes	%	±%
Labor	Bert Lazzarini	31,188	55.3	+51.9
United Australia	Henry Storey	25,190	44.7	−1.4
Total formal votes		56,378	97.8	
Informal votes		1,241	2.2	
Turnout		57,619	96.9	
Labor gain from Labor (NSW)		Swing	+55.3	

==== 1934 ====
1934 Australian federal election: Werriwa
Party	Candidate	Votes	%	±%
United Australia	Thomas Mutch	22,981	46.1	+46.1
Labor (NSW)	Bert Lazzarini	22,561	45.3	+5.3
Communist	Bill Blake	2,610	5.2	+5.2
Labor	Thomas Lavelle	1,695	3.4	−6.0
Total formal votes		49,847	97.1	
Informal votes		1,466	2.9	
Turnout		51,313	96.6	
Two-party-preferred result
Labor (NSW)	Bert Lazzarini	26,180	52.5	+3.2
United Australia	Thomas Mutch	23,667	47.5	+47.5
Labor (NSW) gain from Country		Swing	+3.2	

==== 1931 ====
1931 Australian federal election: Werriwa
Party	Candidate	Votes	%	±%
Country	Walter McNicoll	21,762	47.9	+47.9
Labor (NSW)	Bert Lazzarini	18,948	41.7	+41.7
Labor	Ernest Tully	4,254	9.4	−56.0
Ind. United Australia	Mont Sheppard	496	1.1	+1.1
Total formal votes		45,460	96.4	
Informal votes		1,679	3.6	
Turnout		47,139	94.6	
Two-candidate-preferred result
Country	Walter McNicoll	23,518	51.7	+51.7
Labor (NSW)	Bert Lazzarini	21,942	48.3	+48.3
Country gain from Labor		Swing	+17.1	

=== Elections in the 1920s ===
==== 1929 ====
1929 Australian federal election: Werriwa
Party	Candidate	Votes	%	±%
Labor	Bert Lazzarini	28,213	65.4	+3.7
Nationalist	Bernard Grogan	14,903	34.6	−3.7
Total formal votes		43,116	97.3	
Informal votes		1,204	2.7	
Turnout		44,320	94.7	
Labor hold		Swing	+3.7	

==== 1928 ====
1928 Australian federal election: Werriwa
Party	Candidate	Votes	%	±%
Labor	Bert Lazzarini	24,842	61.7	+8.0
Nationalist	Herbert Ogilvie	15,407	38.3	−8.0
Total formal votes		40,249	95.5	
Informal votes		1,900	4.5	
Turnout		42,149	93.1	
Labor hold		Swing	+8.0	

==== 1925 ====
1925 Australian federal election: Werriwa
Party	Candidate	Votes	%	±%
Labor	Bert Lazzarini	20,799	53.7	+0.6
Nationalist	Sir Charles Rosenthal	17,904	46.3	+8.3
Total formal votes		38,703	98.4	
Informal votes		633	1.6	
Turnout		39,336	92.2	
Labor hold		Swing	−0.2	

==== 1922 ====
1922 Australian federal election: Werriwa
Party	Candidate	Votes	%	±%
Labor	Bert Lazzarini	12,397	53.1	+1.3
Nationalist	Henry Bate	8,881	38.0	+1.4
Country	James Newman	2,085	8.9	+8.9
Total formal votes		23,363	95.0	
Informal votes		1,242	5.0	
Turnout		24,605	61.9	
Two-party-preferred result
Labor	Bert Lazzarini		53.9	−0.1
Nationalist	Henry Bate		46.1	+0.1
Labor hold		Swing	−0.1	

=== Elections in the 1910s ===
==== 1919 ====
1919 Australian federal election: Werriwa
Party	Candidate	Votes	%	±%
Labor	Bert Lazzarini	11,948	49.6	+2.4
Nationalist	John Lynch	7,600	31.6	−21.2
Independent	William Wright	4,536	18.8	+18.8
Total formal votes		24,084	92.1	
Informal votes		2,063	7.9	
Turnout		26,147	71.6	
Two-party-preferred result
Labor	Bert Lazzarini	12,275	51.0	+3.8
Nationalist	John Lynch	11,809	49.0	−3.8
Labor gain from Nationalist		Swing	+3.8	

==== 1917 ====
1917 Australian federal election: Werriwa
Party	Candidate	Votes	%	±%
Nationalist	John Lynch	14,607	52.8	+2.8
Labor	Jack Christopher	13,071	47.2	−2.8
Total formal votes		27,678	97.3	
Informal votes		769	2.7	
Turnout		28,447	75.9	
Nationalist gain from Labor		Swing	+2.8	

==== 1914 ====
1914 Australian federal election: Werriwa
Party	Candidate	Votes	%	±%
Labor	John Lynch	13,162	50.0	+5.9
Liberal	Alfred Conroy	13,155	50.0	−5.9
Total formal votes		26,317	97.9	
Informal votes		552	2.1	
Turnout		26,869	75.7	
Labor gain from Liberal		Swing	+5.9	

==== 1913 ====
1913 Australian federal election: Werriwa
Party	Candidate	Votes	%	±%
Liberal	Alfred Conroy	13,998	55.9	+6.5
Labor	Richard Corish	11,062	44.1	−6.5
Total formal votes		25,060	97.4	
Informal votes		682	2.6	
Turnout		25,742	71.5	
Liberal gain from Labor		Swing	+6.5	

==== 1912 by-election ====
1912 Werriwa by-election
Party	Candidate	Votes	%	±%
Labor	Benjamin Bennett	10,884	50.79	−3.83
Liberal	Alfred Conroy	10,546	49.21	+3.83
Total formal votes		21,430	98.71	+0.23
Informal votes		279	1.29	−0.23
Registered electors		28,565		
Turnout		21,709	76.00	+0.94
Labor hold		Swing	−3.83	

==== 1910 ====
1910 Australian federal election: Werriwa
Party	Candidate	Votes	%	±%
Labour	David Hall	10,876	54.6	+2.8
Liberal	Granville Ryrie	9,036	45.4	−2.8
Total formal votes		19,912	98.5	
Informal votes		307	1.5	
Turnout		20,219	75.1	
Labour hold		Swing	+2.8	

=== Elections in the 1900s ===
==== 1906 ====
1906 Australian federal election: Werriwa
Party	Candidate	Votes	%	±%
Labour	David Hall	7,316	51.8	+20.5
Anti-Socialist	Alfred Conroy	6,818	48.2	−20.5
Total formal votes		14,134	96.5	
Informal votes		518	3.5	
Turnout		14,652	57.2	
Labour gain from Anti-Socialist		Swing	+20.5	

==== 1903 ====
1903 Australian federal election: Werriwa
Party	Candidate	Votes	%	±%
Free Trade	Alfred Conroy	6,545	68.7	+16.8
Labour	Arthur Barrett	2,976	31.3	+31.3
Total formal votes		9,521	96.7	
Informal votes		322	3.3	
Turnout		9,843	46.7	
Free Trade hold		Swing	+16.8	

==== 1901 ====
1901 Australian federal election: Werriwa
Party	Candidate	Votes	%	±%
Free Trade	Alfred Conroy	4,025	51.9	+51.9
Protectionist	Thomas Rose	3,731	48.1	+48.1
Total formal votes		7,756	98.3	
Informal votes		138	1.7	
Turnout		7,894	69.9	
Free Trade win		(new seat)		
