= Department of Works =

Department of Works may refer to:

- Department of Works (1938–39), an Australian government department
- Department of Works (1945), an Australian government department
- Department of Works (1952–73), an Australian government department
