= John Lynch (Australian politician) =

Australian politician

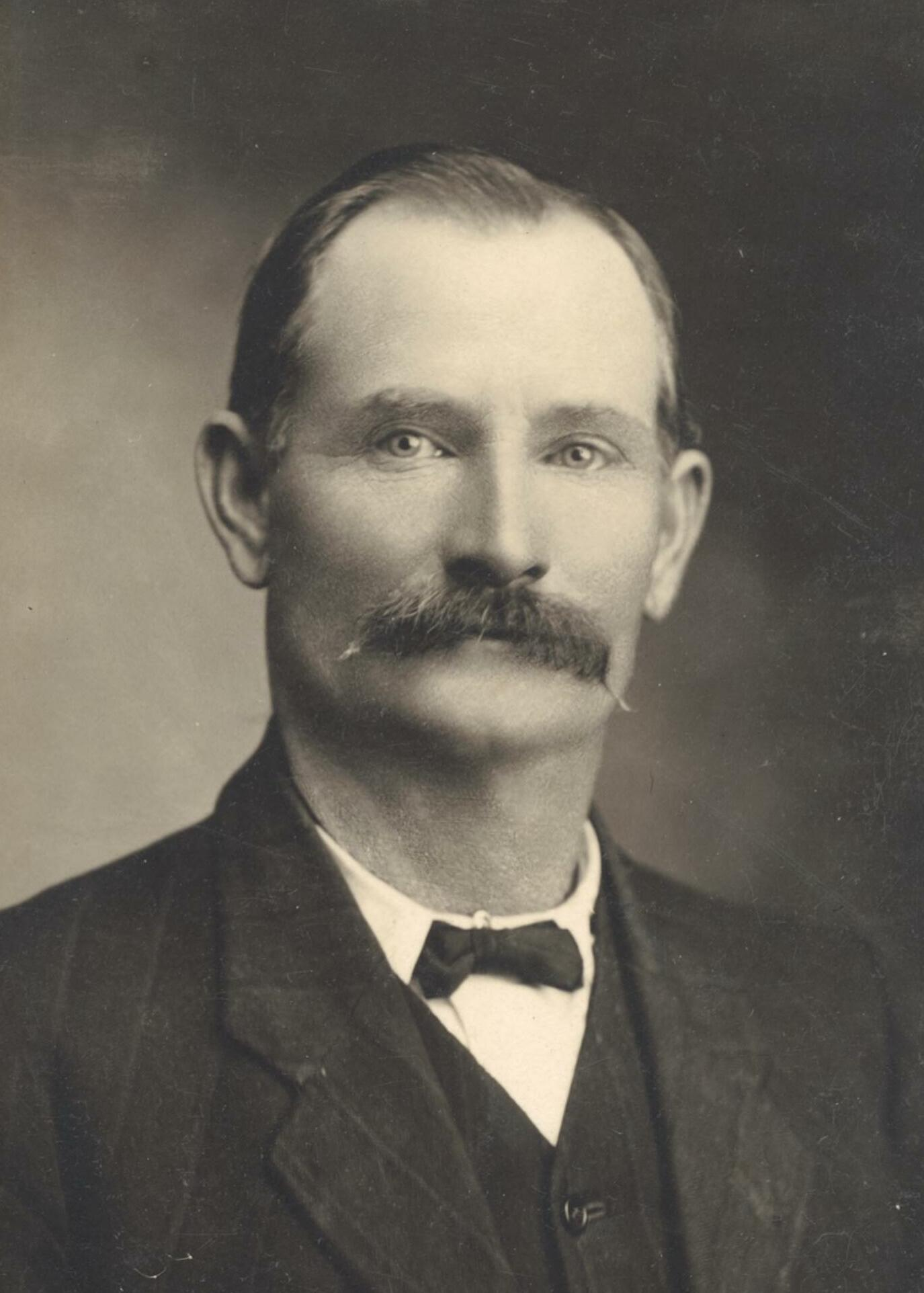

Member of the Australian Parliament for Werriwa
- In office 5 September 1914 – 13 December 1919
- Preceded by: Alfred Conroy
- Succeeded by: Bert Lazzarini

Personal details
- Born: 1862 Young, New South Wales
- Died: 15 June 1941 (aged 78–79)
- Party: Labor (1914–17); Nationalist (1917–19)
- Occupation: Road contractor

John Lynch (1862 – 15 June 1941) was an Australian politician. He was a member of the Australian House of Representatives from 1914 to 1919, initially for the Labor Party before joining the Nationalist Party following the 1916 Labor split.

Born in Young, New South Wales, Lynch was educated at St Mary's Denominational School before becoming a mining, road and railway contractor and dam sinker along with his father and brothers. In 1890, after being injured in a workplace accident, he selected land at Thuddungra, establishing and clearing the 1400-acre "Glenachrawn" property. He largely grew wheat on the property, but also experimented in cotton-growing. Lynch was a foundation councillor and deputy president for seven years of the Burrangong Shire, a member of the Young Land Board, a member of the local Pastures Protection Board and a justice of the peace. Lynch was an active member of the Australian Workers' Union and Young Political Labor League and was a prominent member of the Hibernian Society. He had initially been endorsed as the Labor candidate for the 1912 Werriwa by-election, but was forced to withdraw due to procedural issues with his nomination.

In 1914, he was elected to the Australian House of Representatives as the Labor member for Werriwa, defeating Liberal MP Alfred Conroy. Lynch was one of the Labor members who left the party in the 1916 Labor split over conscription in World War I, walking out of caucus in support of expelled Prime Minister Billy Hughes in November and being formally expelled from the party himself in December. Lynch joined the new Nationalist Party along with the other MPs involved in the split and won re-election as a Nationalist in 1917, but was defeated in 1919 by Labor's Bert Lazzarini.

After his political defeat, Lynch returned to farming at "Glenachrawn" and was a prolific "writer to the press of letters and articles on rural matters". After three years of failing health, he died at the Sacred Heart Hospital in Young in 1941.

Parliament of Australia
Preceded by Alfred Conroy	Member for Werriwa; 1914 – 1919	Succeeded by Bert Lazzarini
