= Burrangong Argus =

Newspaper in New South Wales, Australia published from 1865 to 1913

The Burrangong Argus was an Australian newspaper based in Young, New South Wales, published twice-weekly from 1865 to 1913. It was, at the time of its closure, the oldest newspaper in Young. It sold at 6d per copy, then 3d per copy and finally 1d per copy, as it attempted to compete with later rivals the Young Chronicle and Young Witness.

It was first published on 22 October 1864 by John Bird Stormer. James George Clevier was editor for the first three months, after which Stormer assumed the role himself. It replaced an earlier newspaper, The Star, which had folded some time beforehand. Stormer would reportedly deliver the newspaper himself around the mining diggings, which had only been renamed from Lambing Flat to Young the year before after the fallout of the infamous Lambing Flat riots.

At the end of 1869, Stormer sold the newspaper to one of his contributors, Benjamin John Bennett, and moved to Gulgong, where he founded the Gulgong Argus. There was fierce competition between the Argus and its later rival the Burrangong Chronicle. Bennett Sr was reported to decline to take a part in public movements so as not to interfere with his independence as a journalist.

Bennett Sr died in January 1891, and his widow Anne Josephine Bennett inherited his interest, with the newspaper being managed by their son, Benjamin Holland Bennett. The newspaper took on a less conservative tone under Bennett Jr, who unlike his father was a Labor supporter. Chris Watson, the first Labor Prime Minister of Australia, reputedly credited the support of the Argus for significantly assisting his first election to parliament. The Young Chronicle described the newspaper's politics as having been "independent at the start; then it favoured the Liberal side, and finally...took up the cudgels here on behalf of Labor".

Bennett Jr acquired his mother's interest in the newspaper in 1911. He was elected to the Australian House of Representatives in 1912, with F. H. Hopwood assuming the editorship in his absence. The Argus ceased publication in February 1913, with the newspaper's assets sold to the Young Newspaper Company, owners of the Young Witness. The new owners reportedly stated it had been decided that "the wiser course will be to damp down the fires, so to speak, of [the Argus] altogether". The last issue was printed on 8 February 1913.

The Freeman's Journal described the Argus following its closure as "the only authentic record existing" of the earlier periods of the town's history. It wrote that "its path has been an undeviating one of pure unalloyed honesty", and suggested that if it had been less so it might have experienced more success. The Australian Town and Country Journal wrote that it "contributed largely towards the advancement of Young and the district around".
