= Louis Loder =

Australian public servant and policymaker

Sir Louis Loder CBE

Director-General of the Department of Works
- In office 2 February 1945 – 13 July 1945

Director-General of the Department of Works and Housing
- In office 13 July 1945 – 4 June 1952

Director-General of the Department of Works
- In office 6 June 1952 – 29 December 1961

Personal details
- Born: 30 December 1896 Louis Francis Loder
- Died: 11 February 1972 (aged 75)
- Spouse(s): Jean Arnot (m. 1924–1972; his death)
- Education: University of Melbourne
- Occupation: Public servant

Sir Louis Francis Loder CBE (30 December 1896 – 11 February 1972) was a senior Australian public servant and policymaker. He was head of the Department of Works between 1945 and his retirement in 1961.

== Life and career ==
Louis Loder was born in Sale, Victoria on 30 December 1896.

Loder served in the Australian Imperial Force during the First World War.

Between 1928 and 1940, Loder was Chief Engineer at the Victorian Country Roads Board. He then went on to work for Allied Works between 1940 and 1945.

In 1945, Loder was appointed to be Director-General of the newly established Department of Works (later Department of Works and Housing and then Department of Works (II)). In these roles, Loder was responsible for the design, costing, supervision and execution of all architectural and engineering works for the Australian Government. During this time he was occupied with work that included coordinating the works of experts to establish the Snowy River Hydro-electric scheme as urgent politics, working to manage the expansion of war aircraft facilities at Mascot Airport in Sydney and managing the rocket range at Woomera.

Loder retired from the Australian Public Service in 1961. On retirement, Loder was planning a 13-month overseas holiday.

Loder died in Healesville, Victoria on 11 February 1972.

== Awards and honours ==
Loder was made a Commander of the Order of the British Empire in June 1953. He was appointed a Knight Bachelor in June 1962.

In 1987, a street in the Canberra suburb of Theodore was named Louis Loder Street in Loder's honour.

Government offices
New title Department established	Director-General of the Department of Works (II); 1945	Succeeded by Himself as Secretary of the Department of Works and Housing
Preceded by Himself as Secretary of the Department of Works (II)	Director-General of the Department of Works and Housing; 1945 – 1952	Succeeded by Himself as Secretary of the Department of Works (III)
Preceded by Himself as Secretary of the Department of Works and Housing	Director-General of the Department of Works; 1952 – 1961	Succeeded by Ronald Lewis
