= Benjamin Bennett (politician) =

Australian politician (1872–1939)

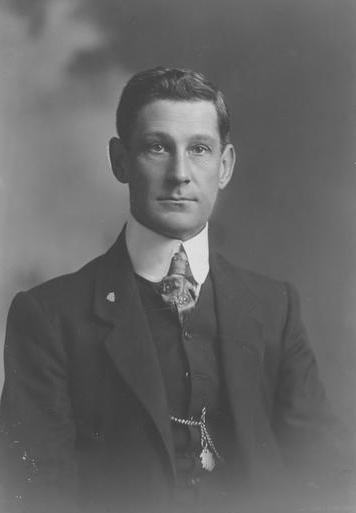

Member of the Australian Parliament for Werriwa
- In office 1 June 1912 – 23 April 1913
- Preceded by: David Hall
- Succeeded by: Alfred Conroy

Personal details
- Born: 1872 Young, New South Wales
- Died: 12 June 1939 (aged 66–67)
- Party: Australian Labor Party
- Occupation: Newspaper editor

Benjamin Holland Bennett (1872 – 12 July 1939) was an Australian politician. He was an Australian Labor Party member of the Australian House of Representatives from 1912 to 1913.

Bennett was born in Young, New South Wales and was educated at Young Superior Public School. He studied law, but when his father, owner of the Burrangong Argus newspaper, died, Bennett returned to the family newspaper as manager and editor, and then later owner after acquiring his mother's interest. Although Bennett's father had been conservative in his politics, Bennett was supportive of Labor and a long-rumoured potential Labor candidate. He was secretary of the Young Turf Club and Burrangong Turf Club for many years and was president of the Young branch of the Labor Party.

Bennett was elected to the House of Representatives at a 1912 by-election after the resignation of David Hall to serve as NSW Solicitor-General. The Argus ceased publication in February 1913, with its assets sold to the Young Witness. Bennett's term in parliament was short-lived, however, as an unfavourable electoral redistribution hampered his chances of re-election and he decided not to contest the 1913 federal election.

Bennett was appointed a clerk in the New South Wales Registrar-General's Department in 1917 and retired from the department in 1936. During the 1920s, he was president of the Public Service section of the Australian Clerical Association and the union's vice-president. Bennett died in 1939 and was cremated at Rookwood Crematorium.

Parliament of Australia
Preceded by David Hall	Member for Werriwa; 1912 – 1913	Succeeded by Alfred Conroy
