= Department of Works and Housing =

Australian government department, 1945–1952

Department overview
- Formed: 13 July 1945
- Preceding Department: Department of Works (II)
- Dissolved: 4 June 1952
- Superseding Department: Department of Works (III)
- Jurisdiction: Commonwealth of Australia
- Ministers responsible: Bert Lazzarini, Minister (1945–1946); Nelson Lemmon, Minister (1946–1949); Richard Casey, Minister (1949–1951); Wilfrid Kent Hughes, Minister (1951–1952)
- Department executive: Louis Loder, Secretary

The Department of Works and Housing was an Australian government department that existed between July 1945 and June 1952.

== Scope ==
Information about the department's functions and government funding allocation could be found in the Administrative Arrangements Orders, the annual Portfolio Budget Statements and in the department's annual reports.

The functions of the department were listed at its creation as:

- Design, estimate of cost, supervision and execution of all architectural and engineering works (both capital and maintenance) for the Commonwealth Government and such other works as were requested by a state or an authority of the Commonwealth or of a state
- Inspection of all works and advice to the department concerned as to necessary maintenance and the estimated cost of such maintenance
- Formulation of proposals for the co-ordination of works projects independently initiated by two or more departments
- Formulation of town planning proposals in areas controlled by the Commonwealth in collaboration with other responsible departments
- Technical advice in relation to Commonwealth works programs
- Investigation, planning and development of such works of national importance as were referred to the department by the Commonwealth government
- Technical advice to the Commonwealth in relation to works of a state, or of an authority of a state, in which the Commonwealth had a direct financial interest, and, if so directed by the Commonwealth Government, the design or execution of those works
- Collaboration with Commonwealth and state departments and authorities and local authorities on regional and town planning insofar as it affected Commonwealth works
- Submissions to the Defence Services of works proposals or work plans (other than defence works) for which the Commonwealth was wholly or partially responsible, and which, in the consideration of the department, had strategic importance
- Collaboration in research carried out by Commonwealth and state departments or authorities in relation to works and the circulation of relevant data to interested departments or authorities; and also the planning and conduct of such further research as the department considered necessary in relation to matters affecting the planning, design and execution of works

== Structure ==
The department was a Commonwealth Public Service department, staffed by officials who were responsible to the Minister for Works and Housing.
