= Bert Lazzarini =

Australian politician (1884–1952)

The Honourable Bert Lazzarini
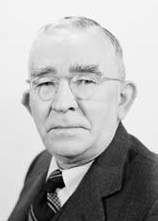

Minister for Works and Housing
- In office 13 July 1945 – 1 November 1946
- Prime Minister: Ben Chifley
- Preceded by: Himself (Works)
- Succeeded by: Nelson Lemmon

Minister for Works
- In office 6 February 1945 – 13 July 1945
- Prime Minister: John Curtin; Frank Forde
- Preceded by: New office
- Succeeded by: Himself (Works and Housing)

Minister for Home Security
- In office 7 November 1941 – 2 February 1946
- Prime Minister: John Curtin; Frank Forde; Ben Chifley
- Preceded by: Joe Abbott
- Succeeded by: Abolished

Member of the Australian Parliament for Werriwa
- In office 15 September 1934 – 1 October 1952
- Preceded by: Walter McNicoll
- Succeeded by: Gough Whitlam
- In office 13 December 1919 – 19 December 1931
- Preceded by: John Lynch
- Succeeded by: Walter McNicoll

Personal details
- Born: Hubert Peter Lazzarini; 8 September 1884 Young, New South Wales, Australia
- Died: 1 October 1952 (aged 68) Fairfield, New South Wales, Australia
- Party: Labor
- Other political affiliations: Lang Labor (1931–1936)
- Spouse: Constance Williams (m. 1916)
- Relations: Carlo Lazzarini (brother)
- Occupation: Draper

Hubert Peter Lazzarini (Italian: [laddzaˈriːni]; 8 September 1884 – 1 October 1952) was an Australian politician. He was a member of the Australian Labor Party (ALP) and represented the Division of Werriwa in the House of Representatives for over 30 years (1919–1931, 1934–1952). After the ALP split of 1931 he joined the Lang Labor faction, which was reunited with the official ALP in 1936. In the 1940s Lazzarini held ministerial office in the Curtin and Chifley governments, serving as Minister for Home Security (1941–1946), Works (1945), and Works and Housing (1945–1946).

== Early life ==
Lazzarini was born on 8 September 1884 in Young, New South Wales. He was the son of Annie (née Stubbs) and Pietro Lazzarini; his older brother Carlo also entered politics. Their mother was an Australian, while their father was born in Italy and came to Australia via the United States.

Lazzarini was educated at a Catholic school in Young. Before entering politics he worked as a draper, initially at Holbrook and later at his own business in Wellington. He married Constance Williams in 1916, with whom he had a son and two daughters. In 1919 he moved to the Sydney suburb of Dulwich Hill.

== Politics ==
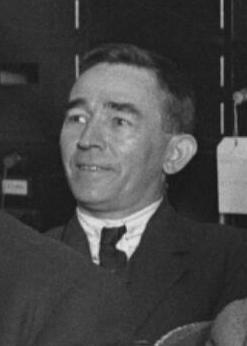
Lazzarini in 1928

Lazzarini won the seat of Werriwa in the 1919 election, when it was a rural electorate that included the Southern Highlands, Goulburn and part of the South West Slopes, including Young. He won re-election at the 1922, 1925, 1928 and 1929 elections when Werriwa had moved eastward to include the Illawarra and Sutherland Shire, but had lost the South West Slopes and some of the Southern Highlands. He was a part of break-away Lang Labor from 1931 to 1936. He lost the seat at the 1931 election and regained it at the 1934 election, when it included the Sydney suburb of Liverpool—which was then semi-rural—for the first time and had lost Goulburn. He was Minister for Home Security and Minister assisting the Treasurer in John Curtin's first and second ministry and Minister for Works and Housing in Ben Chifley's first ministry. The Chifley government was defeated at the 1949, but Lazzarini was re-elected for Werriwa, which had been redistributed to lose the llawarra.

Carlo Lazzarini was Hubert's brother and was also a member of parliament, and died one month after Hubert.

== Personal life ==
Lazzarini died of cerebral haemorrhage in the Sydney suburb of Fairfield, survived by his wife, son and two daughters. Gough Whitlam succeeded him in the seat of Werriwa at the 1952 by-election.

Bert's great-great-great-grandneice is Courtney Houssos who is a member of the New South Wales Legislative Council.

== Notes ==
Political offices
Preceded by Joe Abbott	Minister for Home Security; 1941–1946	Abolished
New title	Minister for Works and Housing; 1945–1946	Succeeded by Nelson Lemmon
Parliament of Australia
Preceded by John Lynch	Member for Werriwa; 1919–1931	Succeeded by Walter McNicoll
Preceded by Walter McNicoll	Member for Werriwa; 1934–1952	Succeeded by Gough Whitlam
