= The Young Witness =

Newspaper in NSW, Australia

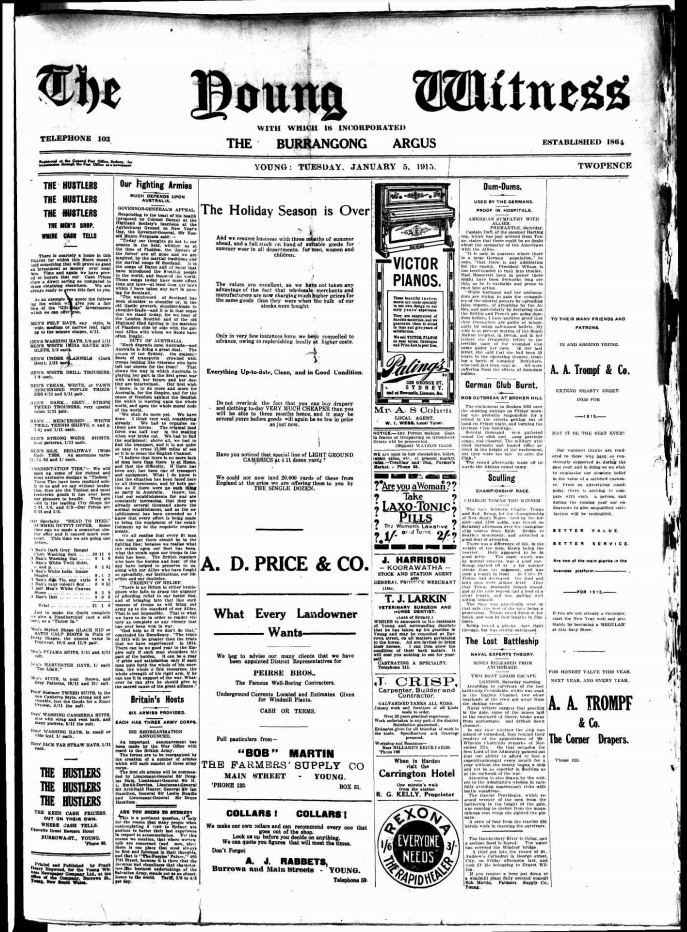
The Young Witness, 5 January 1915

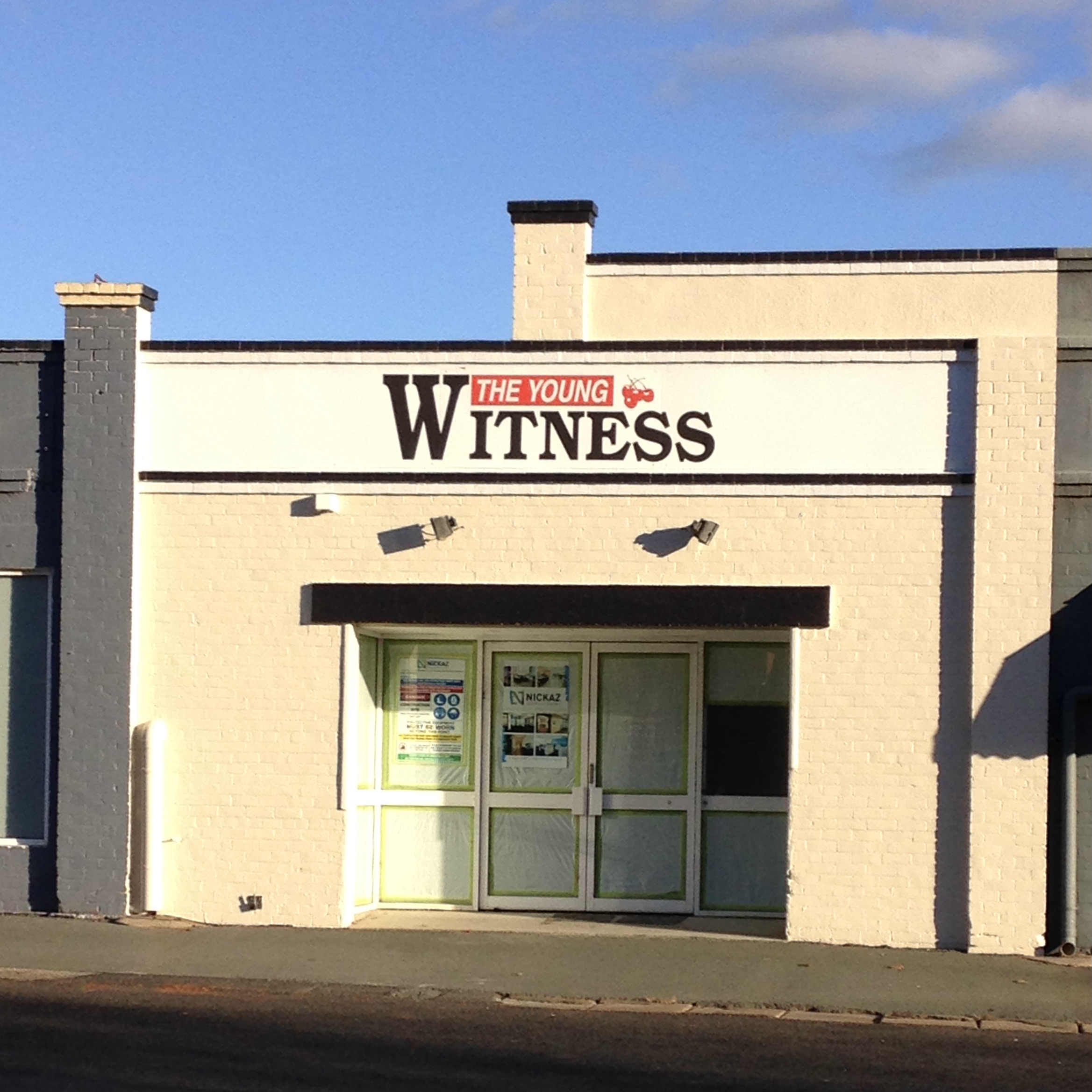
The Young Witness office in 2021

The Young Witness is a newspaper published in Young, New South Wales, Australia. It has previously been published under the names Daily Witness and South West News Pictorial.

== History ==
The Young Witness was first published in 1909. It has since undergone several name changes as well as absorbed several other newspapers from the Young region. It acquired the assets of the defunct Burrangong Argus in 1913. In 1923 the title changed to Daily Witness but reverted to Young Witness in 1931. In 1947, the newspaper absorbed The Young Chronicle. The title was changed to South West News Pictorial in 1961 and this name remained until 1993 when it was merged with The Young Times. At this point the name reverted again to The Young Witness and it is still published under that name. The former editor is Craig Thomson. Rebecca Hewson is the Witness' journalist.

== Digitisation ==
The paper has been digitised as part of the Australian Newspapers Digitisation Program project of the National Library of Australia.

== See also ==
- List of newspapers in Australia
- List of newspapers in New South Wales
