= 1912 Werriwa by-election =

- 1 June 1912

The Werriwa seat in the House of Representatives
- Registered: 28,565
- Turnout: 21,709 (76.00%)
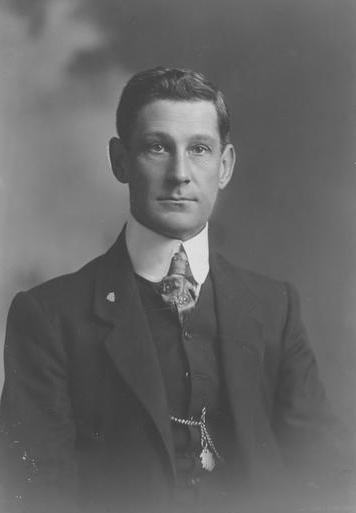

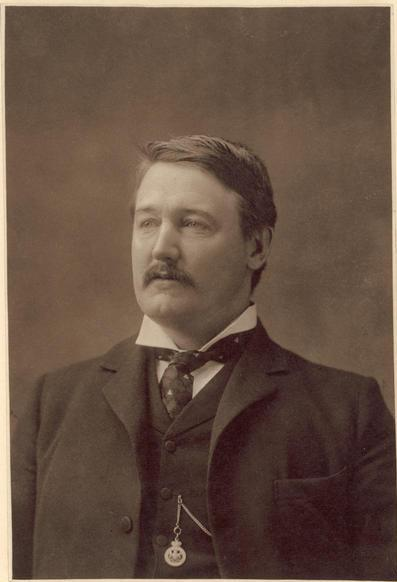
	First party	Second party
Candidate	Benjamin Bennett	Alfred Conroy
Party	Labor	Liberal
Popular vote	10,884	10,546
Percentage	50.79%	49.21%
Swing	▼3.83	▲3.83
MP before election
David Hall
Labor
Elected MP
Benjamin Bennett
Labor

A by-election was held for the Australian House of Representatives seat of Werriwa on 1 June 1912. This was triggered by the resignation of Labor MP David Hall.

The by-election was won by Labor candidate Benjamin Bennett.

== Results ==
1912 Werriwa by-election
Party	Candidate	Votes	%	±%
Labor	Benjamin Bennett	10,884	50.79	−3.83
Liberal	Alfred Conroy	10,546	49.21	+3.83
Total formal votes		21,430	98.71	+0.23
Informal votes		279	1.29	−0.23
Registered electors		28,565		
Turnout		21,709	76.00	+0.94
Labor hold		Swing	−3.83	
