= David Hall (Australian politician) =

Politician and lawyer in New South Wales, Australia

The Honourable David Hall
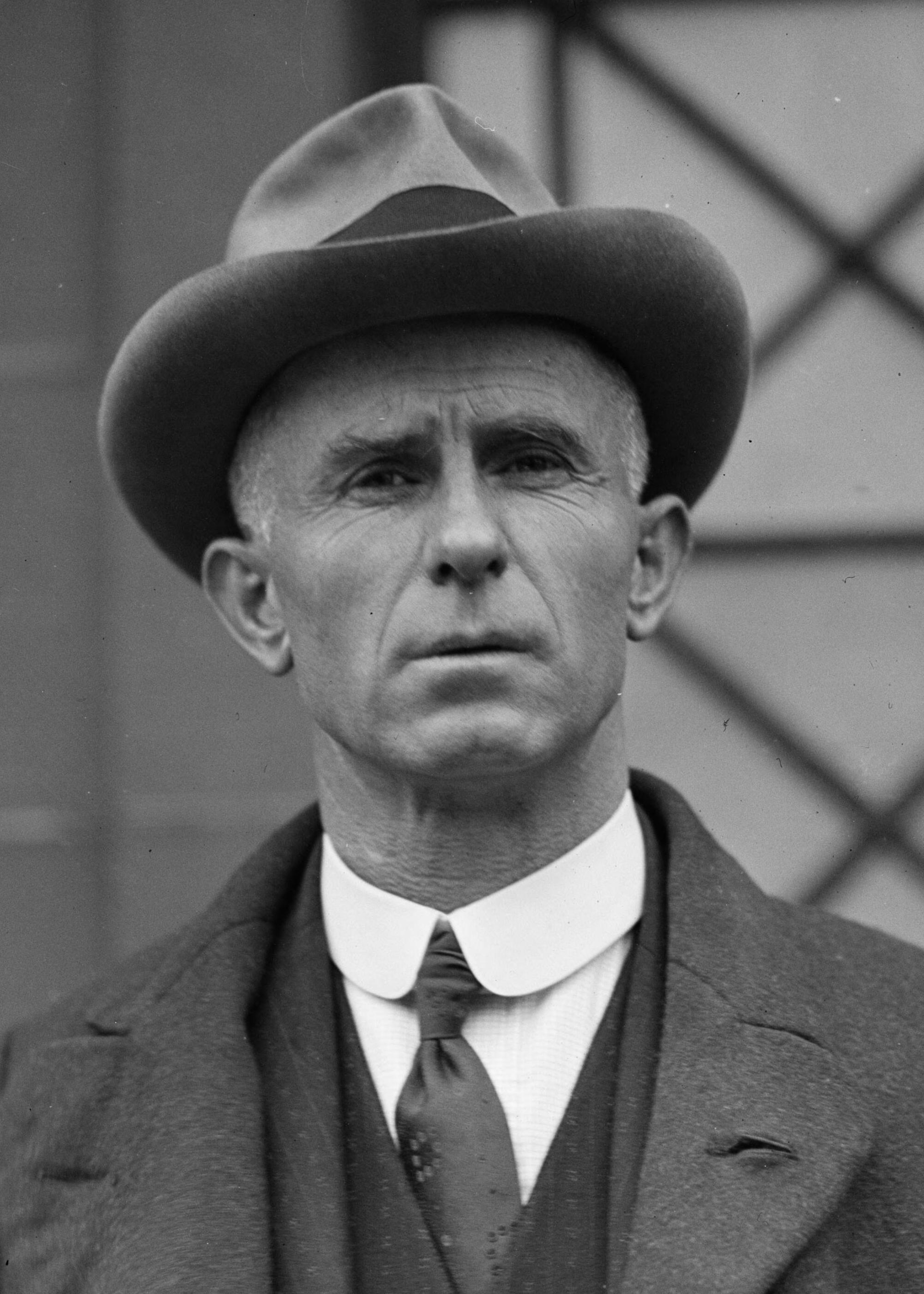
- Hall in 1928

Member of the Australian Parliament for Werriwa
- In office 12 December 1906 – 1 April 1912
- Preceded by: Alfred Conroy
- Succeeded by: Benjamin Bennett

Attorney General of New South Wales
- In office 29 January 1914 – 23 July 1919
- Preceded by: William Holman
- Succeeded by: John Garland KC

Solicitor General for New South Wales
- In office 4 April 1912 – 28 January 1914
- Preceded by: Walter Bevan
- Succeeded by: William Holman

Personal details
- Born: 5 March 1874 Harrietville, Victoria, Australia
- Died: 6 September 1945 (aged 71) Vaucluse, New South Wales, Australia
- Party: Labor (1901–17); Nationalist (1917–20)
- Education: University of Sydney
- Occupation: Barrister

David Robert Hall (5 March 1874 – 6 September 1945) was a politician and lawyer in New South Wales, Australia. He came from a political family which included Maggie Hall and he went to leading positions including Attorney General of New South Wales.

== Early life ==
Hall was born in Harrietville, Victoria. His sisters were Margaret Cable Hall who was known as Maggie, Jeanette and Marion and he had several brothers. His parents, Marion and Thomas had a guest house which was used for political meetings including a visit by Ramsay MacDonald.

He studied law at the University of Sydney before becoming a barrister in 1903. By that time, he had already become involved in state politics, having been elected to the New South Wales Legislative Assembly as the member for the rural electorate of Gunnedah in 1901.

== Federal politics ==
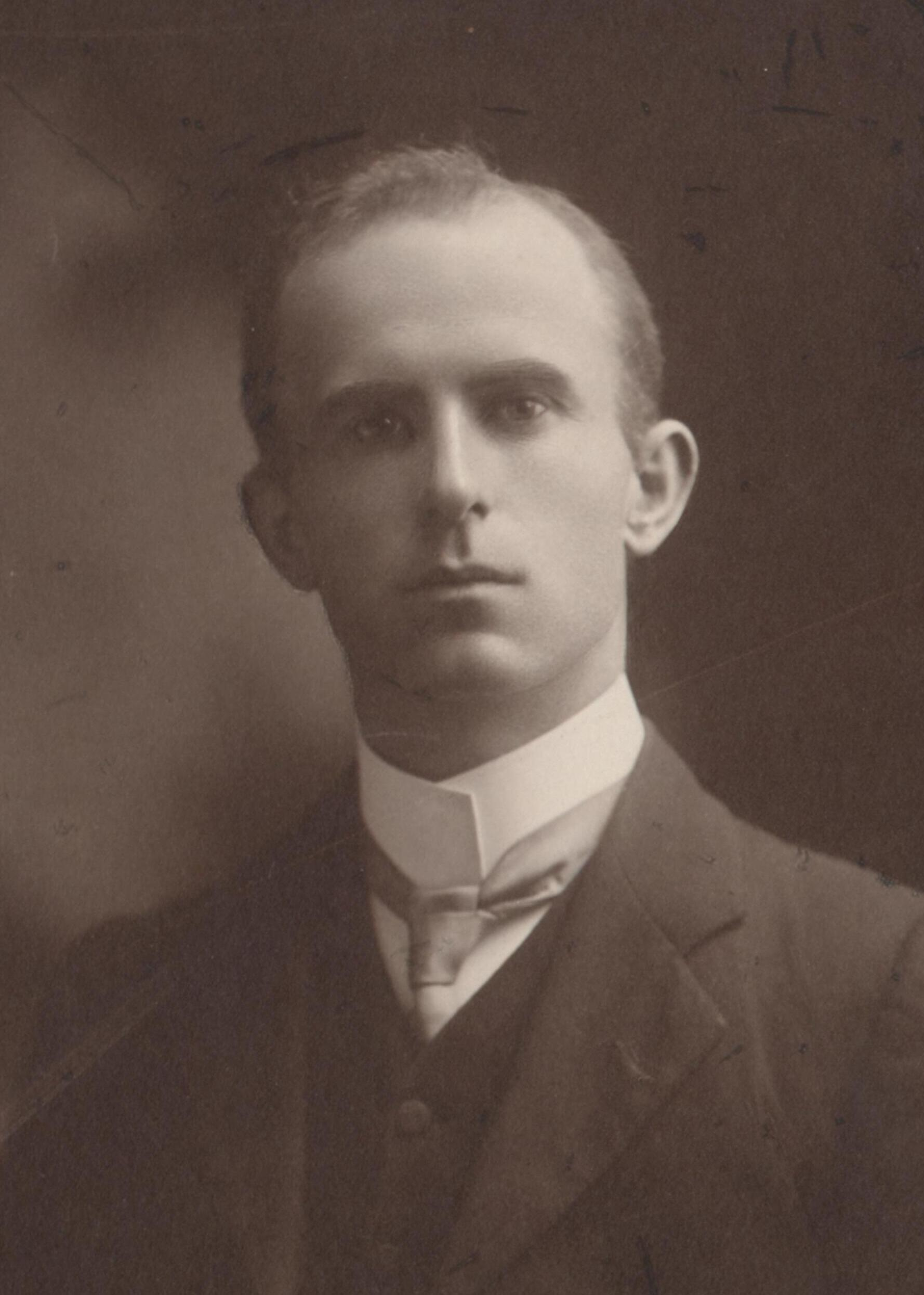
Hall in 1908

Hall made a switch to federal politics at the 1906 election, contesting the House of Representatives seat of Werriwa for the Labor Party. He was successful, defeating Alfred Conroy, the sitting Free Trade Party member. Hall represented the electorate until 1912, when he resigned mid-term to return to State politics. At the subsequent by-election, the new Labor candidate, Benjamin Bennett, once again defeated Conroy.

== State politics ==
On 2 April 1912 New South Wales Premier James McGowen appointed Hall to the Legislative Council and as Minister of Justice. Two days later he was also appointed Solicitor General. Hall moved to the Legislative Assembly when he won the seat of Enmore in December 1913, holding it until 1920. He was Attorney General between 1914 and 1919. Hall was Attorney General in the Holman Labor ministry from 1914 until November 1916 when Holman and his supporters, including Hall, were expelled from the Labor Party for supporting conscription. Holman continued as Premier with the support of the Liberal Reform Party, and Hall continued to be Attorney General, but was no longer Minister of Justice. In 1919 he became Minister for Housing and Vice-President of the Executive Council until February 1920.

== Later life ==
Hall was appointed Agent-General for New South Wales in London in February 1920, but this appointment was cancelled in April by the incoming Storey Labor government.

Hall subsequently had a successful career as a solicitor and ran unsuccessfully for the United Australia Party in the Senate in 1937.

He died in Vaucluse on 6 September 1945 (aged 71).

Parliament of Australia
Preceded by Alfred Conroy	Member for Werriwa; 1906 – 1912	Succeeded by Benjamin Bennett
Parliament of New South Wales
Political offices
Preceded by William Holman	Minister of Justice; 1912 – 1916	Succeeded by John Garland KC
Preceded by Walter Bevan	Solicitor General; 1912 – 1914	Dormant Title next held by William Holman
Preceded by William Holman	Attorney General; 1914 – 1919	Succeeded by John Garland KC
New office	Minister for Housing; 1919 – 1920	Succeeded by Charles Oakes
Preceded by Jack FitzGerald	Vice-President of the Executive Council; 1919 – 1920	Succeeded by George Fuller KC
New South Wales Legislative Assembly
Preceded by Thomas Goodwin	Member for Gunnedah; 1901 – 1904	District abolished
New district	Member for Enmore; 1913 – 1920	District abolished
Diplomatic posts
Preceded by Sir Charles Wade	Agent-General for New South Wales; 1920	Succeeded by Sir Timothy Coghlan
