= Department of Works (1945) =

Australian government department, 1945

Department overview
- Formed: 2 February 1945
- Preceding Department: Department of the Interior
- Dissolved: 13 July 1945
- Superseding Department: Department of Works and Housing
- Jurisdiction: Commonwealth of Australia
- Minister responsible: Bert Lazzarini, Minister
- Department executive: Louis Loder, Director‑General

The Department of Works was an Australian government department that existed between February and July 1945. It was the second so-named Australian government department.

== History ==
The department was established in February 1945 under the Curtin government. Less than five months later, in July 1945, it was dismantled by the Chifley government soon after the death of John Curtin.

== Structure ==
The Department was a Commonwealth Public Service department, staffed by officials who were responsible to the Minister for Works, Bert Lazzarini. The Director-General of the Department was Louis F. Loder.
