= Department of Works (1952–1973) =

Australian government department, 1952–1973

Department overview
- Formed: 4 June 1952
- Preceding Department: Department of Works and Housing
- Dissolved: 30 November 1973
- Superseding Department: Department of Housing and Construction (I)
- Jurisdiction: Commonwealth of Australia
- Ministers responsible: Wilfrid Kent Hughes, Minister (1952–1956); Allen Fairhall, Minister (1956–1958); Gordon Freeth, Minister (1958–1963); John Gorton, Minister (1963–1967); Bert Kelly, Minister (1967–1968); Reg Wright, Minister (1968–1972); Gough Whitlam, Minister (1972); Jim Cavanagh, Minister (1972–1973)
- Department executives: Louis Loder, Secretary (1952–1961); Ronald Lewis, Secretary (1961–1964); George Maunder, Secretary (1964–1967); Alan Reiher, Secretary (1967–1973)

The Department of Works was an Australian government department that existed between June 1952 and November 1973. It was the third so-named Australian government department.

== Scope ==
Information about the department's functions and government funding allocation could be found in the Administrative Arrangements Orders, the annual Portfolio Budget Statements and in the department's annual reports.

The functions of the department were listed in Administrative Arrangements Orders as the planning execution and maintenance of Commonwealth works.

== Structure ==
The department was a Commonwealth Public Service department, staffed by officials who were responsible to the Minister for Works.
