= Alfred Conroy =

Australian politician

The Honourable Alfred Conroy
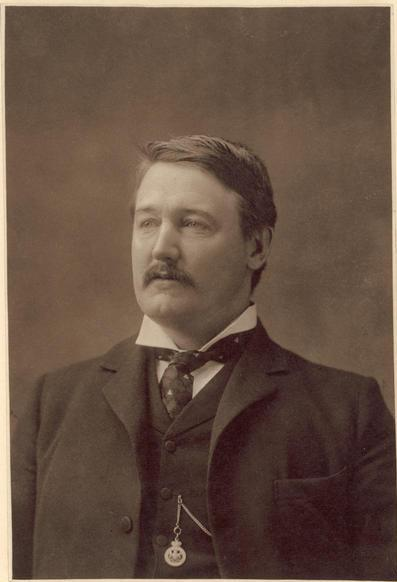

Member of the Australian Parliament for Werriwa
- In office 29 March 1901 – 12 December 1906
- Preceded by: New seat
- Succeeded by: David Hall
- In office 31 May 1913 – 5 September 1914
- Preceded by: Benjamin Bennett
- Succeeded by: John Lynch

Personal details
- Born: 7 April 1864 Winchelsea, Victoria, Australia
- Died: 28 November 1920 (aged 56) Warrawee, New South Wales, Australia
- Party: Free Trade (1901–06); Liberal (1913–14)
- Occupation: Barrister

Alfred Hugh Beresford Conroy (7 April 1864 – 28 November 1920) was an Australian politician. Born in Winchelsea, Victoria, the son of James McDowall Conroy, he was educated at Hawthorn Grammar School in Melbourne. Becoming a bank clerk and surveyor, he moved to Goulburn in New South Wales in 1883. In 1893 he became a barrister, and he was an alderman on Goulburn Council. In 1901, he was elected to the Australian House of Representatives as the inaugural member for Werriwa, representing the Free Trade Party. In 1906, he was defeated by Labor candidate David Hall, but in 1913 he was returned to the Parliament, again as the member for Werriwa but this time representing the Commonwealth Liberal Party. He was defeated again in 1914, and retired, dying in 1920.

== Personal life ==
In 1900, Conroy married Adele Sophie Doyle, a niece of colonial MP Jack Want. The couple had three children. They separated in 1915 and he successfully petitioned for a divorce in 1918 on the grounds of abandonment.

Conroy died of heart failure on 28 November 1920, aged 56, at his home in Warrawee.

Parliament of Australia
Preceded by New seat	Member for Werriwa; 1901–1906	Succeeded by David Hall
Preceded by Benjamin Bennett	Member for Werriwa; 1913–1914	Succeeded by John Lynch
