= List of Australian federal elections =

This article summarises results for the general elections to the Australian House of Representatives and Senate, respectively the lower and upper houses of Australia's federal bicameral legislative body, the Parliament of Australia. The number of seats has increased steadily over time, from 111 for the first election, to the current total of 227; 151 in the Lower House and 76 in the Upper House. The current federal government structure was established in 1901 by the Commonwealth of Australia Constitution Act, 1901.

The first three national elections resulted in minority governments. The world’s first ever Labor Party Prime Minister took office in Australia in 1904, though Labor governed in minority. The first majority government was formed in 1909, when the Protectionist Party merged with the Free Trade Party in an anti-socialist alliance. However, the first Party to win majority government at an election was the Labor Party in 1910.

During the first 50 years of Federation, the Labor Party was the most successful party, governing for approximately fifteen years in total. The Nationalist Party governed for approximately twelve years and The United Australia Party governed for approximately nine years.

However, after the formation of the Liberal Party of Australia, it became the dominant force. After winning its first election in 1949, the Liberal Party of Australia stayed in power for approximately 22 years. Between 1949 and 2025, the party has held office for a total of approximately 50 years. During the same time, the Labor Party held office for approximately 24 years. However, in the period between 1972 and 2022, both Labor and Liberal have held power for almost equal lengths of time - the Liberals (in Coalition) have held power for 28 years and Labor has held power for 24 years.

Since WW2, two groups have dominated politics in Australia: Labor and the Coalition, composed of the Liberal Party and the National Party (formerly the Country Party). Since the foundation of the Liberal Party in 1944, every government has been formed either by the Coalition or by the Labor Party. Prior to this, the main non-Labor Parties to form government consisted of the Protectionist party (which formed the first government in 1901), the Nationalist Party and the United Australia Party (which was led by Robert Menzies prior to him founding the Liberal Party).

Although government has been a two-party system, since 1955 Australians have consistently elected Senators from multiple parties. This has included defectors from the major parties such as the Democratic Labor Party, which was formed by defectors from the Australian Labor Party, and the Australian Democrats, whose founding leader defected from the Liberal Party. In the 1955 election one DLP candidate was elected (under the ALP-AC banner). Although the DLP ceased to be a force after Gough Whitlam took power in 1972, the Liberal Movement and its successor the Australian Democrats carved out their own niche. In the 1980s the NDP briefly gained election, and in the 1990s the Greens were elected to the Senate.

By 2007, the Democrats' federal parliamentary representation had disappeared, while the Greens have emerged at the national level to take their place. The Nationals' representation has also steadily declined, with their percentage of the vote hitting new lows. With the high-profile defection of Senator Julian McGauran to the Liberals in 2006, questions have been raised about the Nationals' viability, and proposals for a Liberal-National party merger have increased in strength. More recently various smaller parties or microparties are represented.

== Results ==
=== House of Representatives ===
The total for the party forming government after the election is bolded. Parties that have never formed government are listed under "Others".

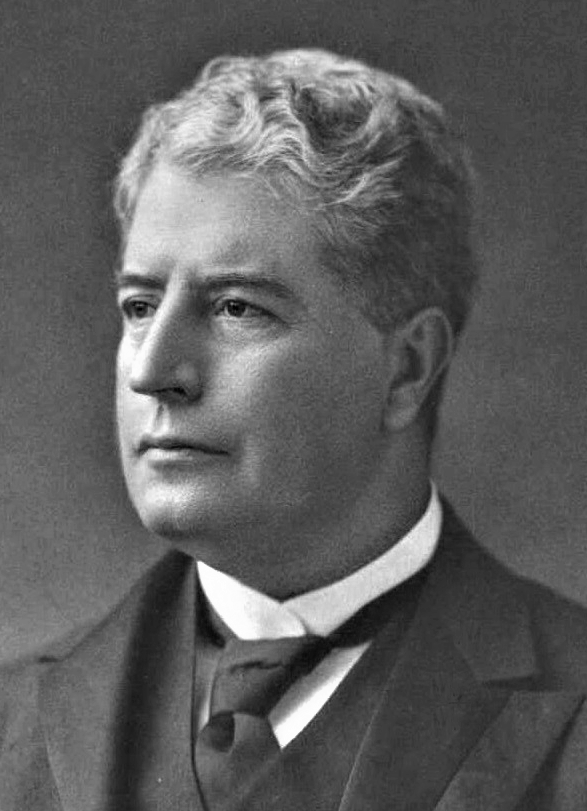
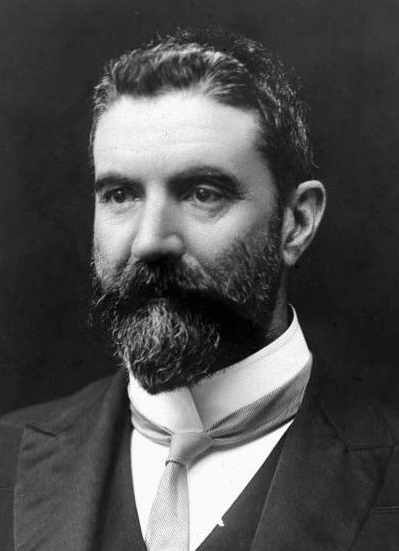
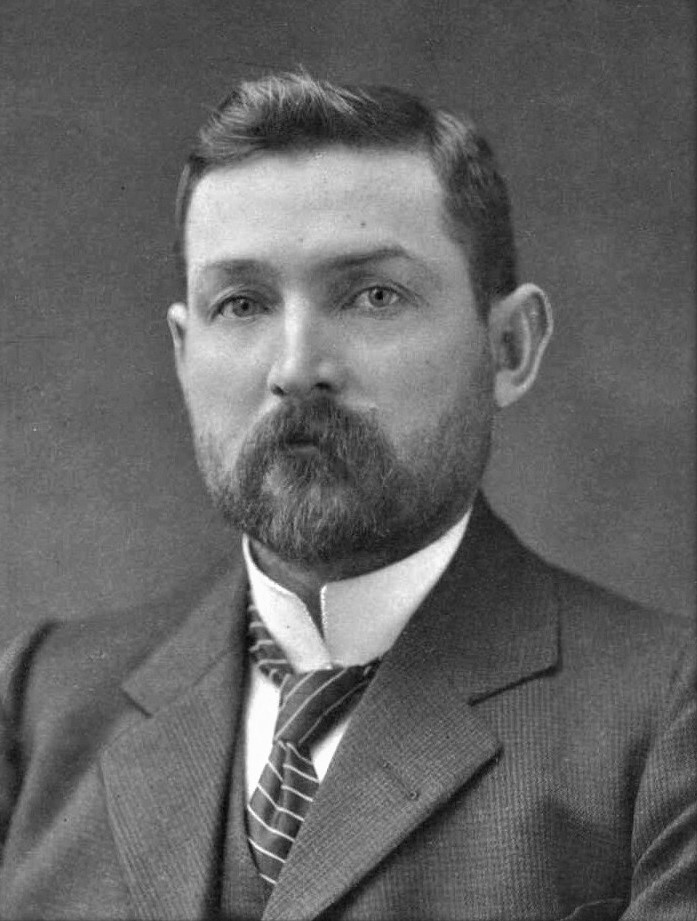
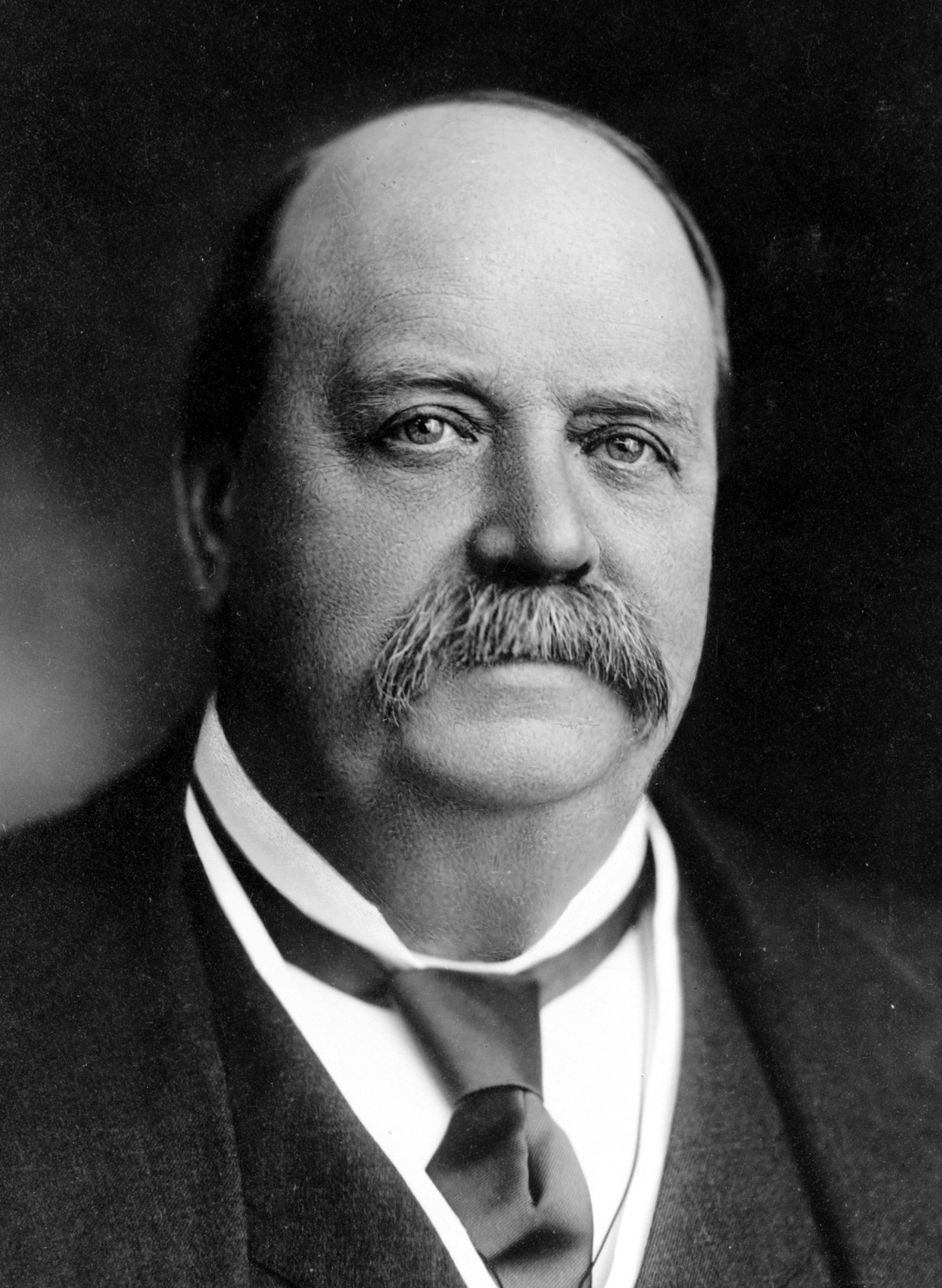
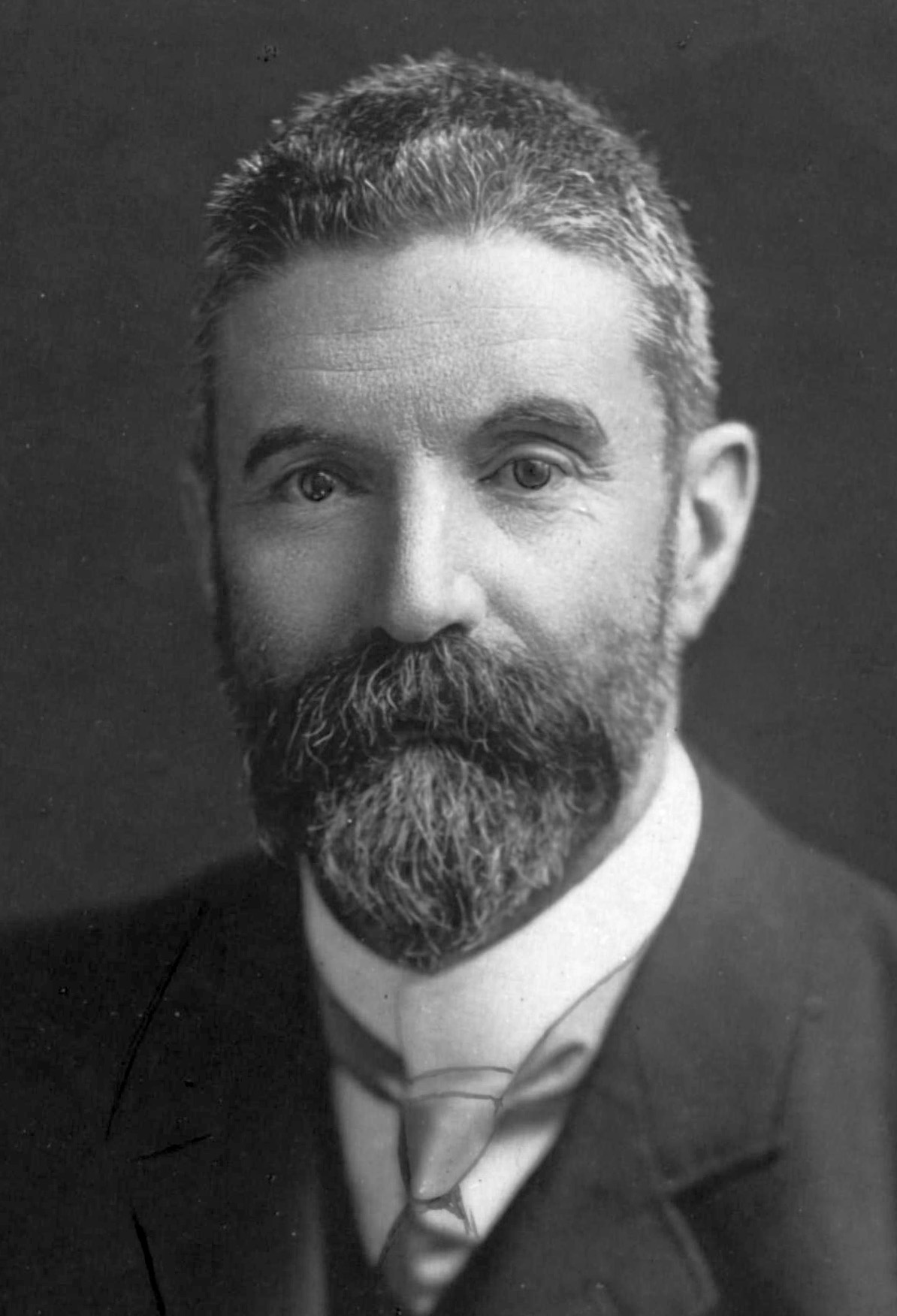
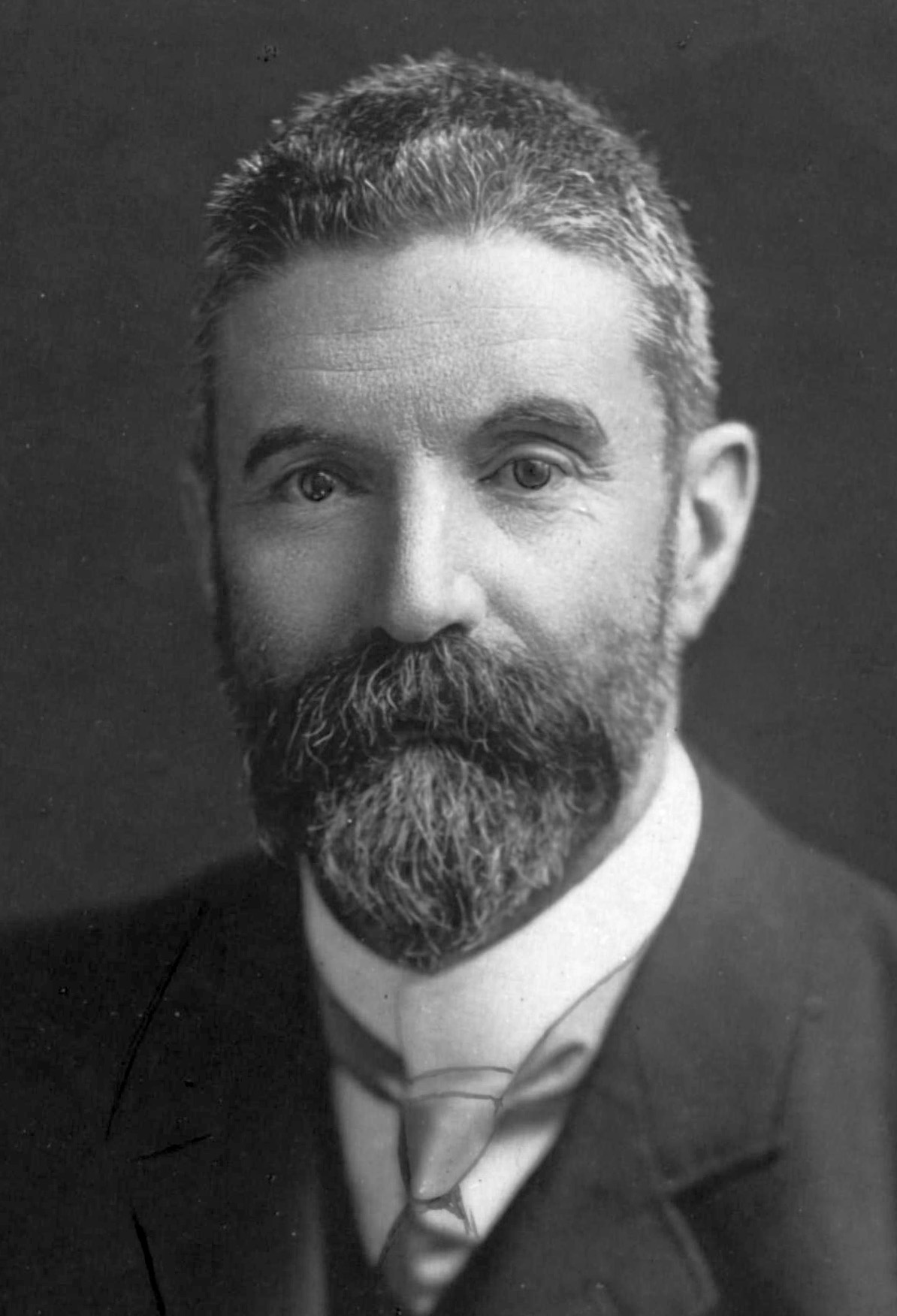
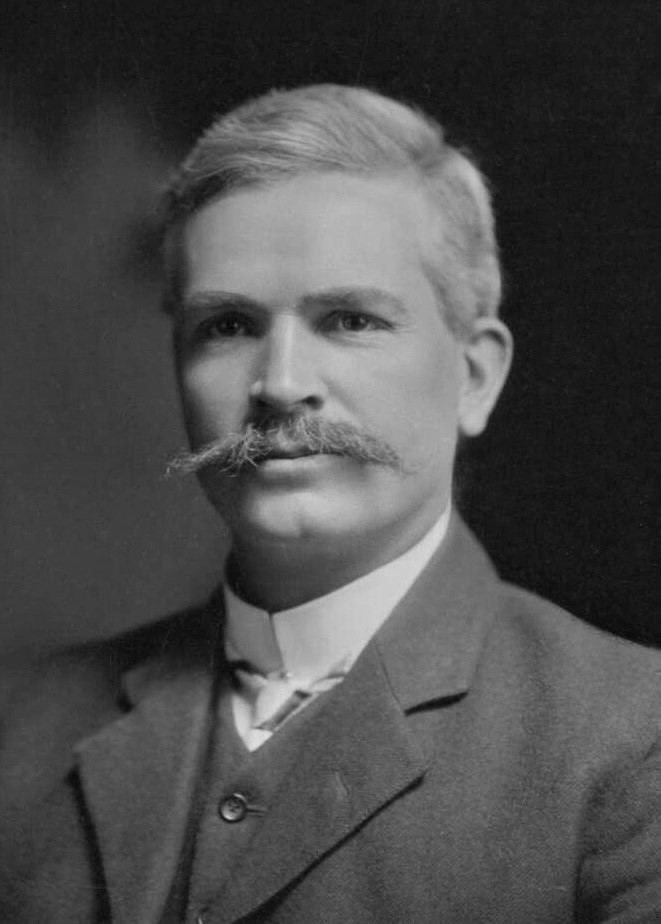
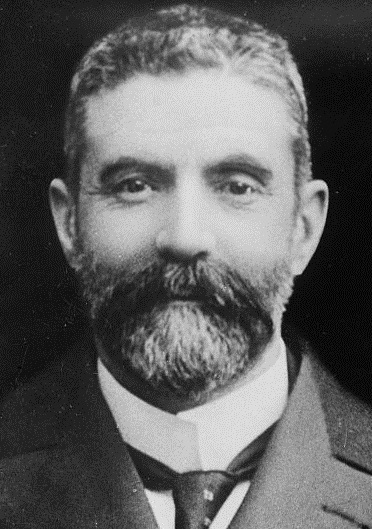
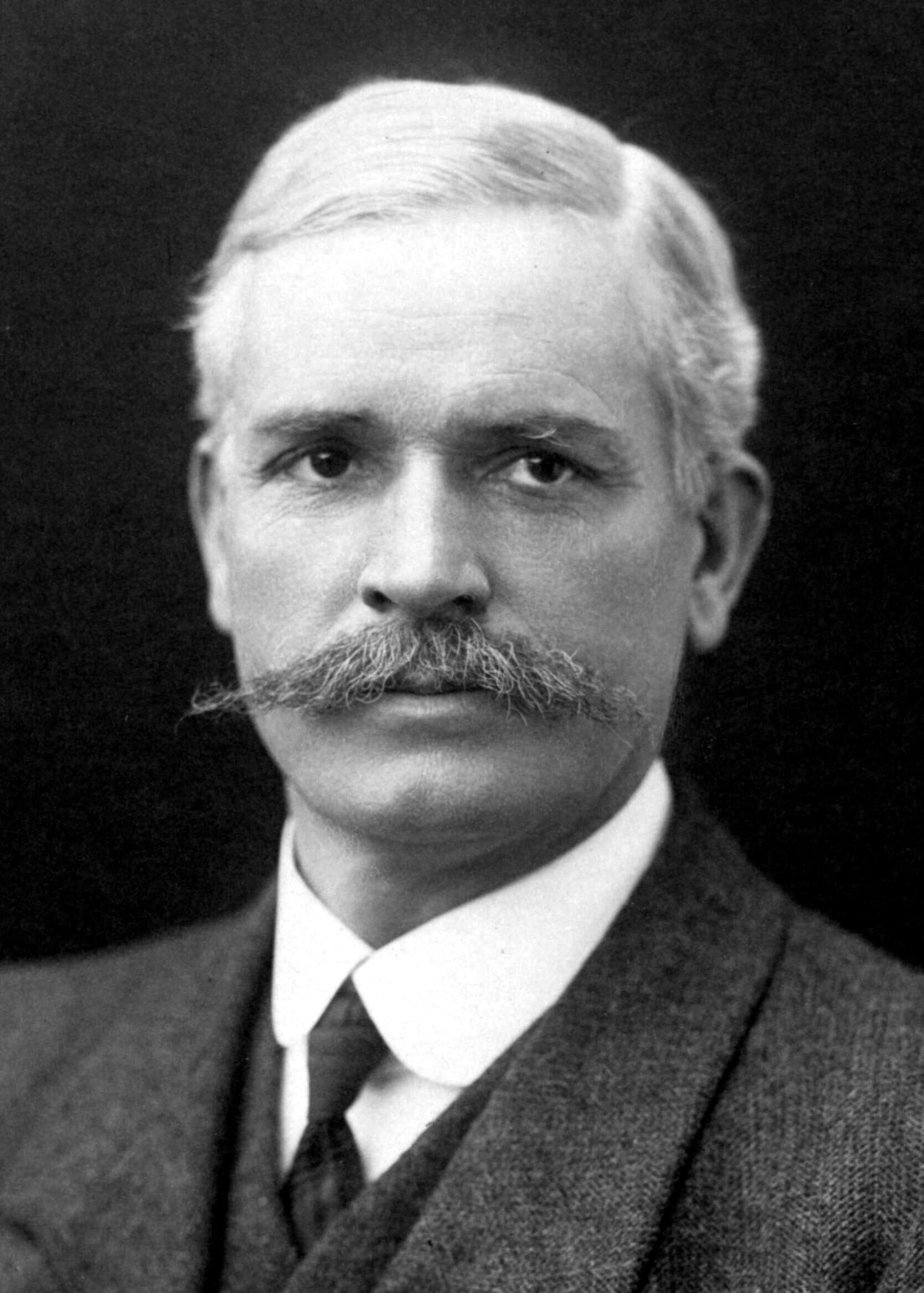
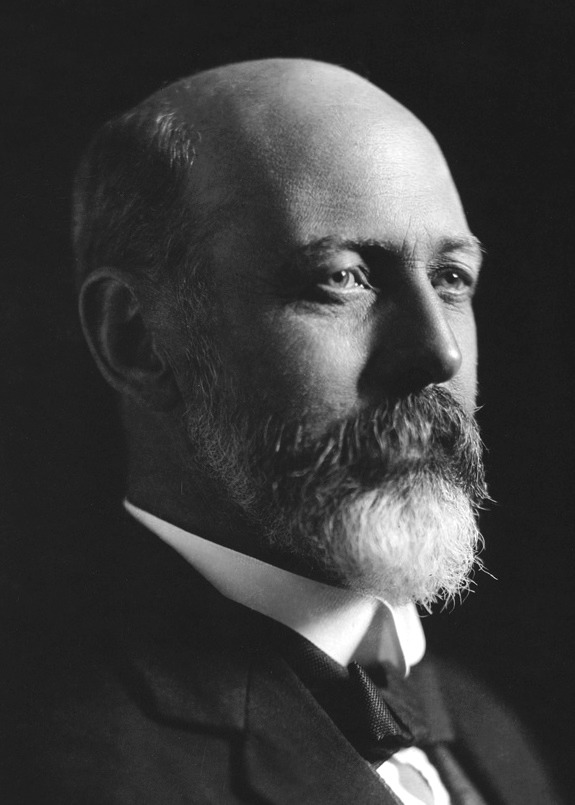
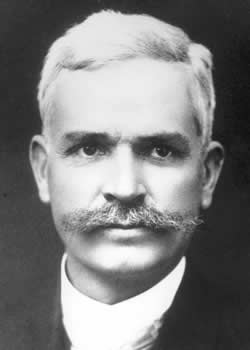
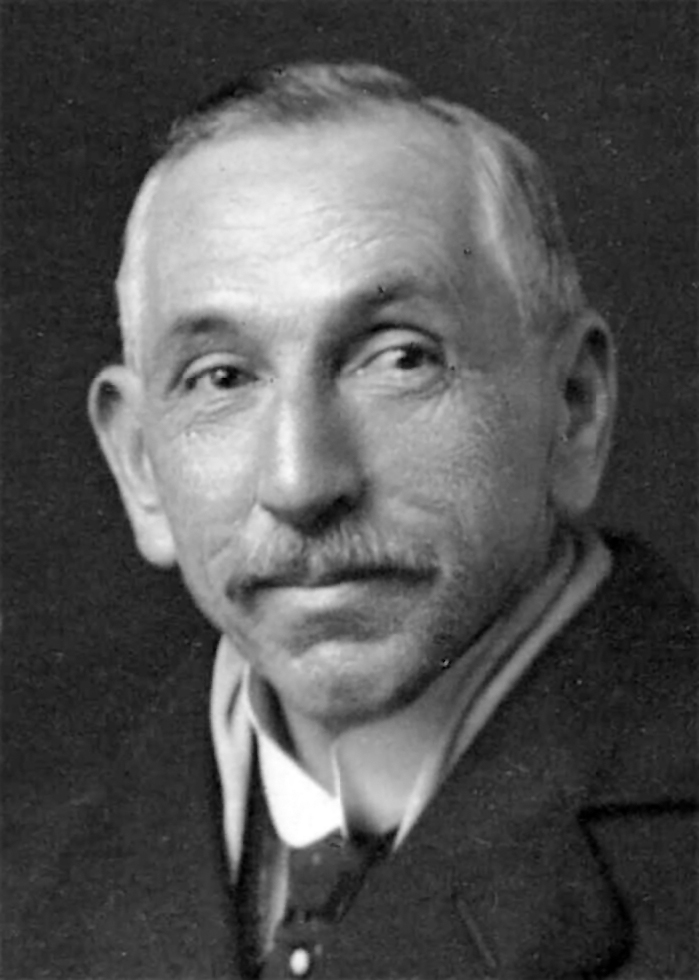
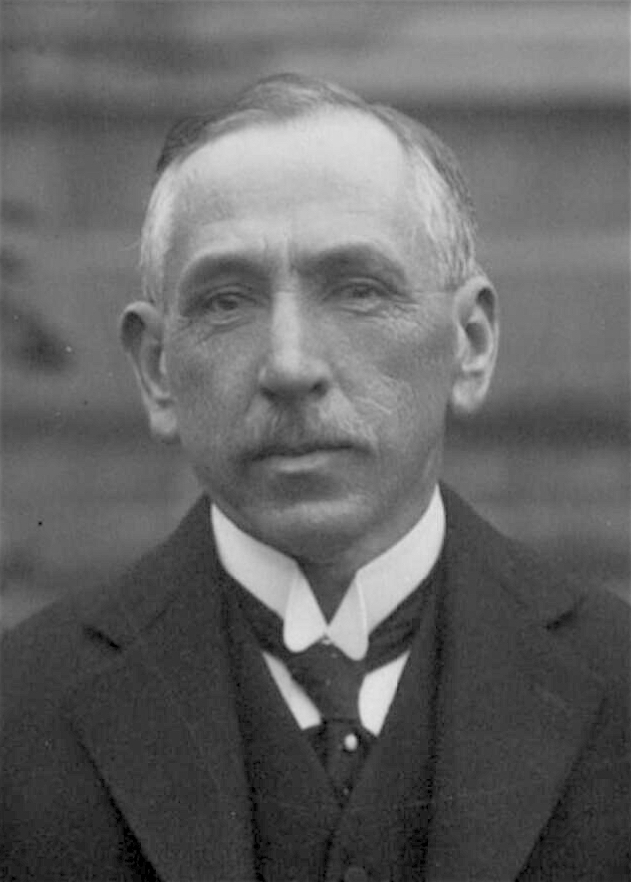
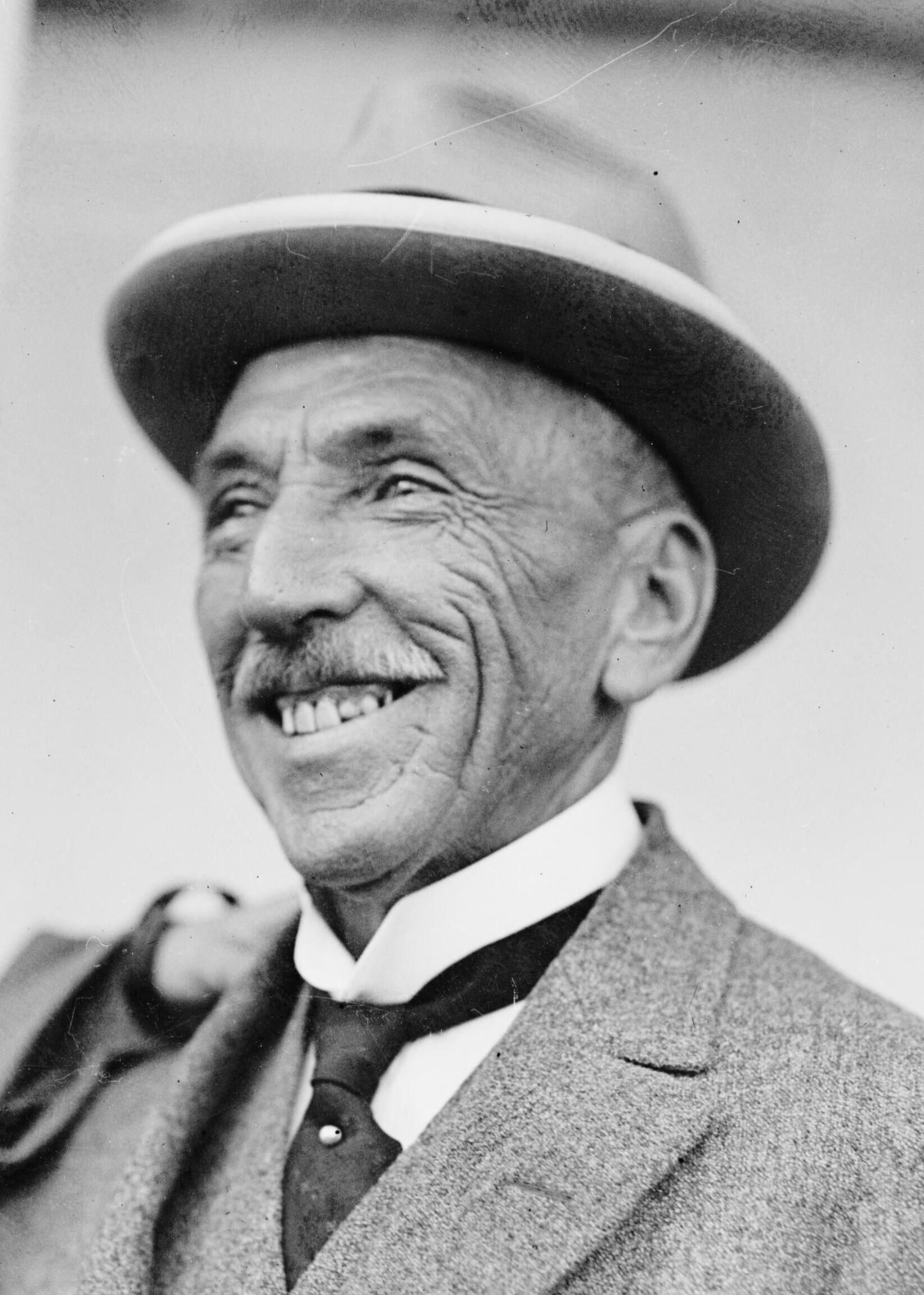
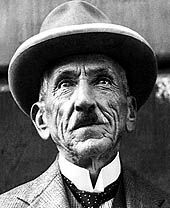
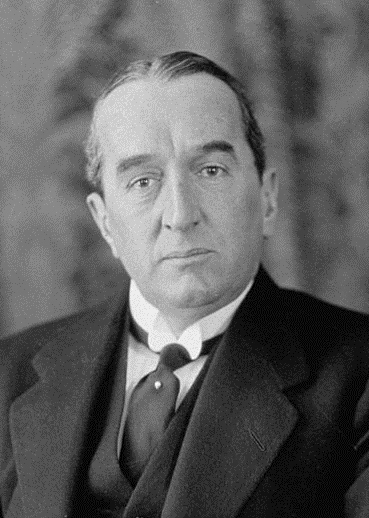
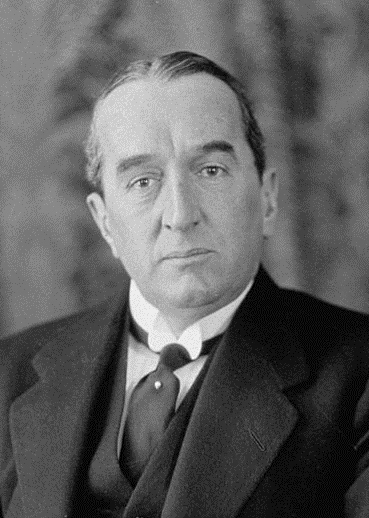
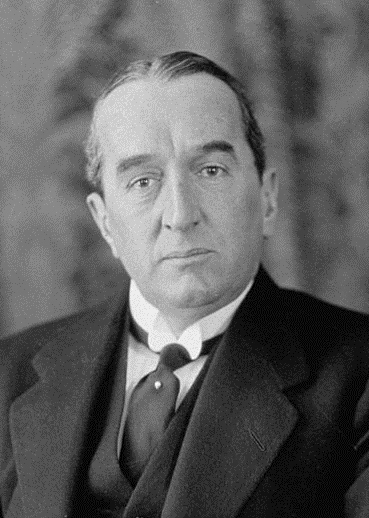
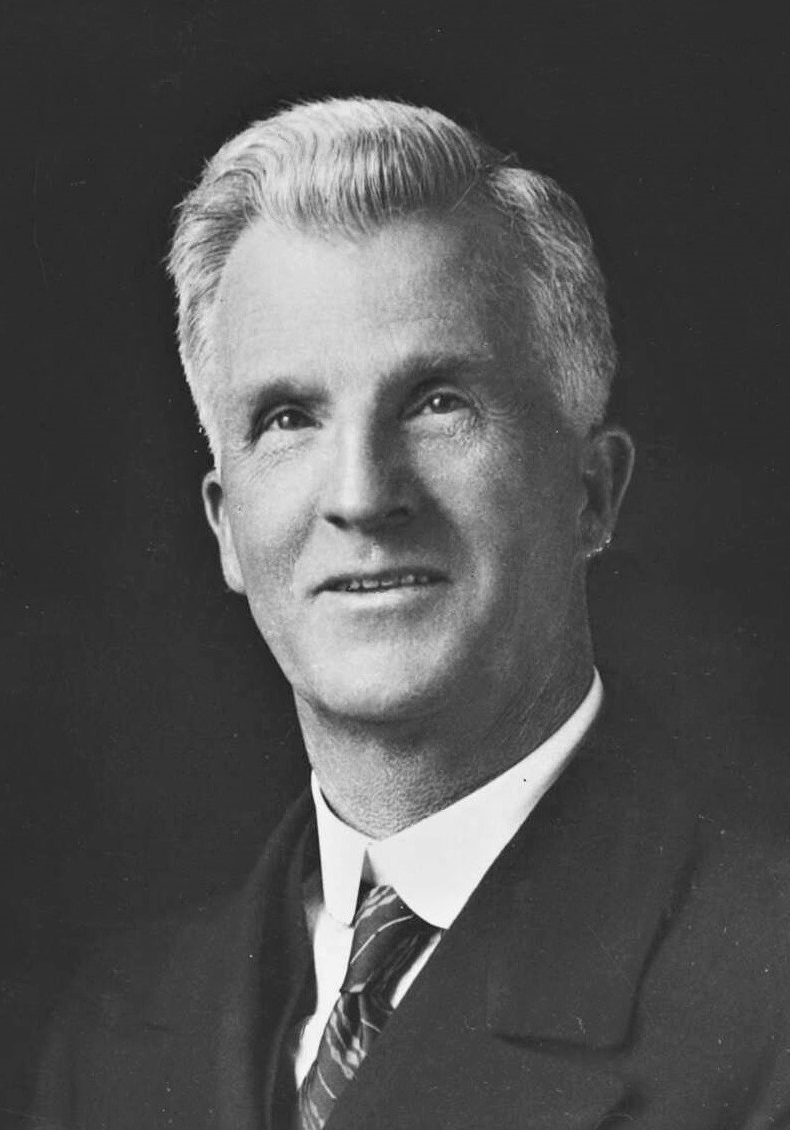
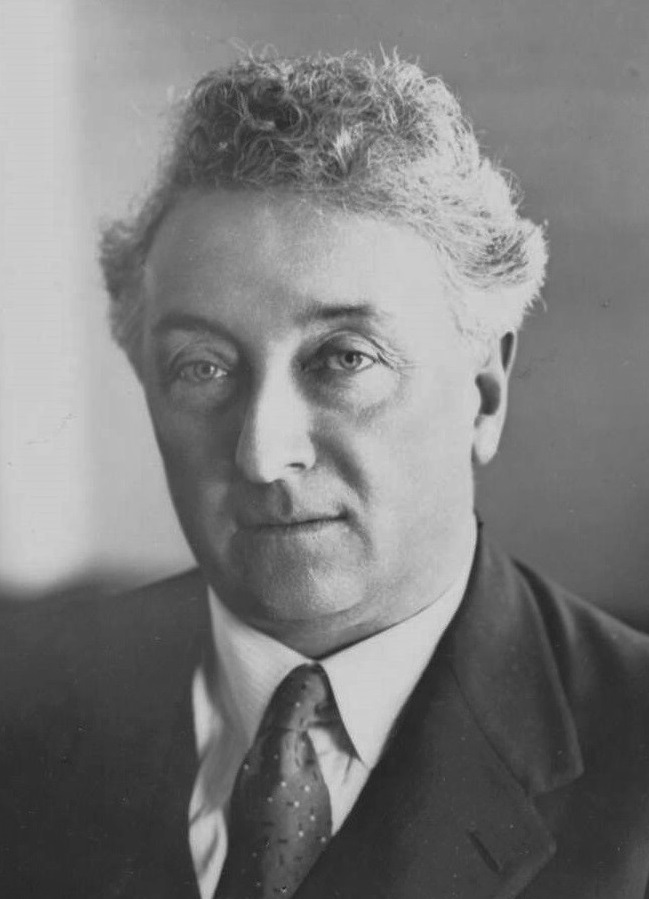
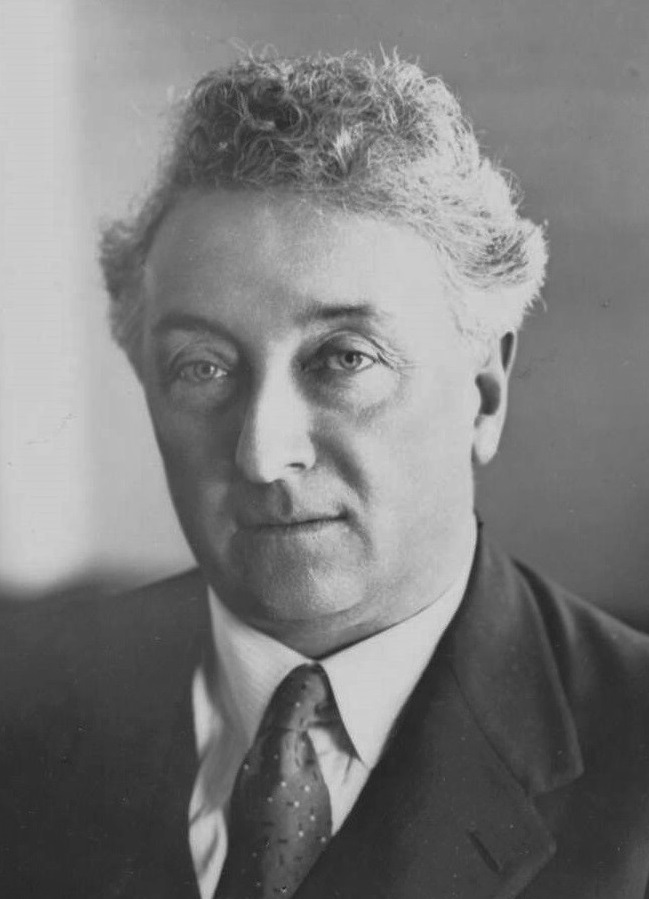
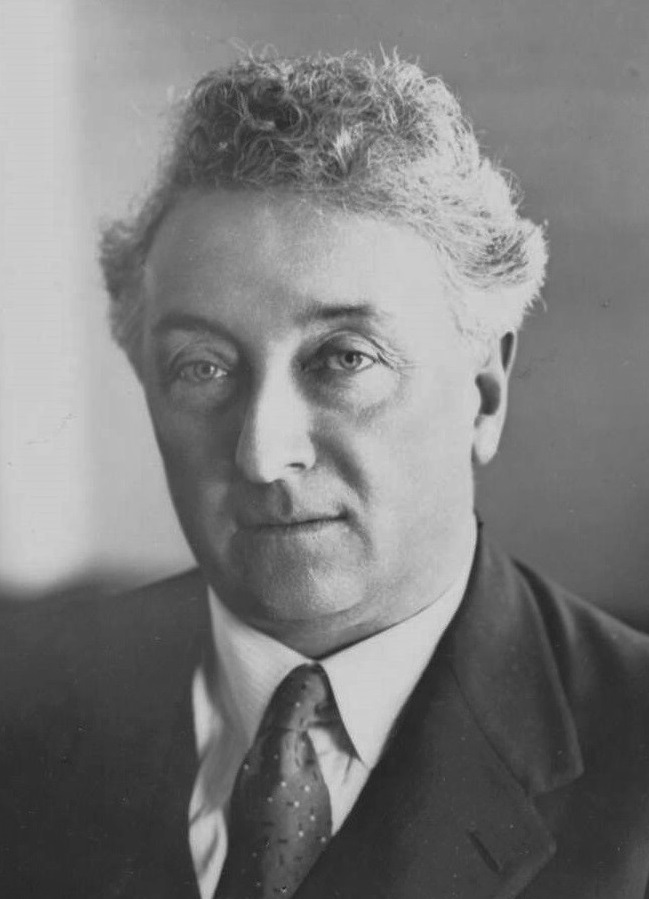
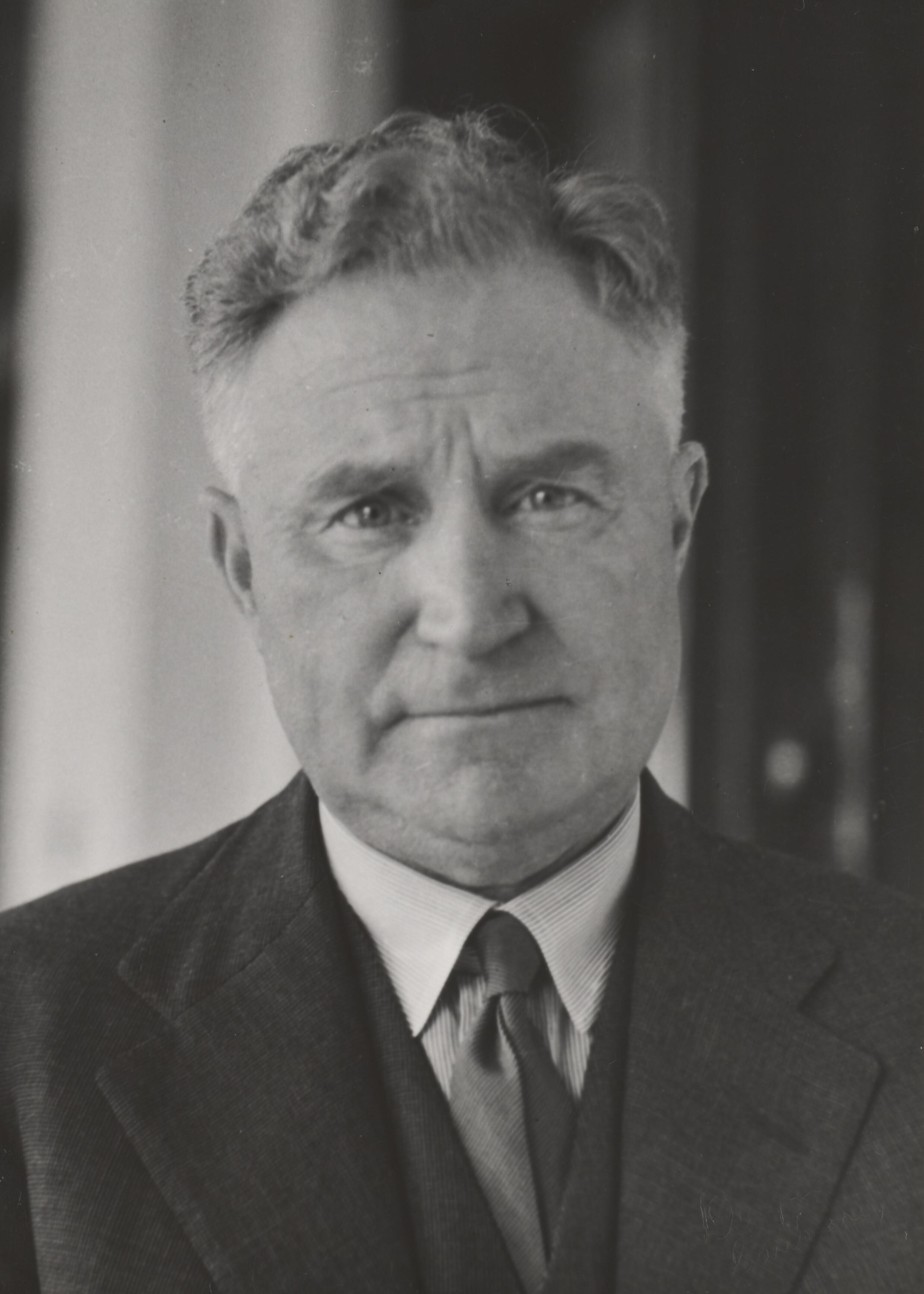
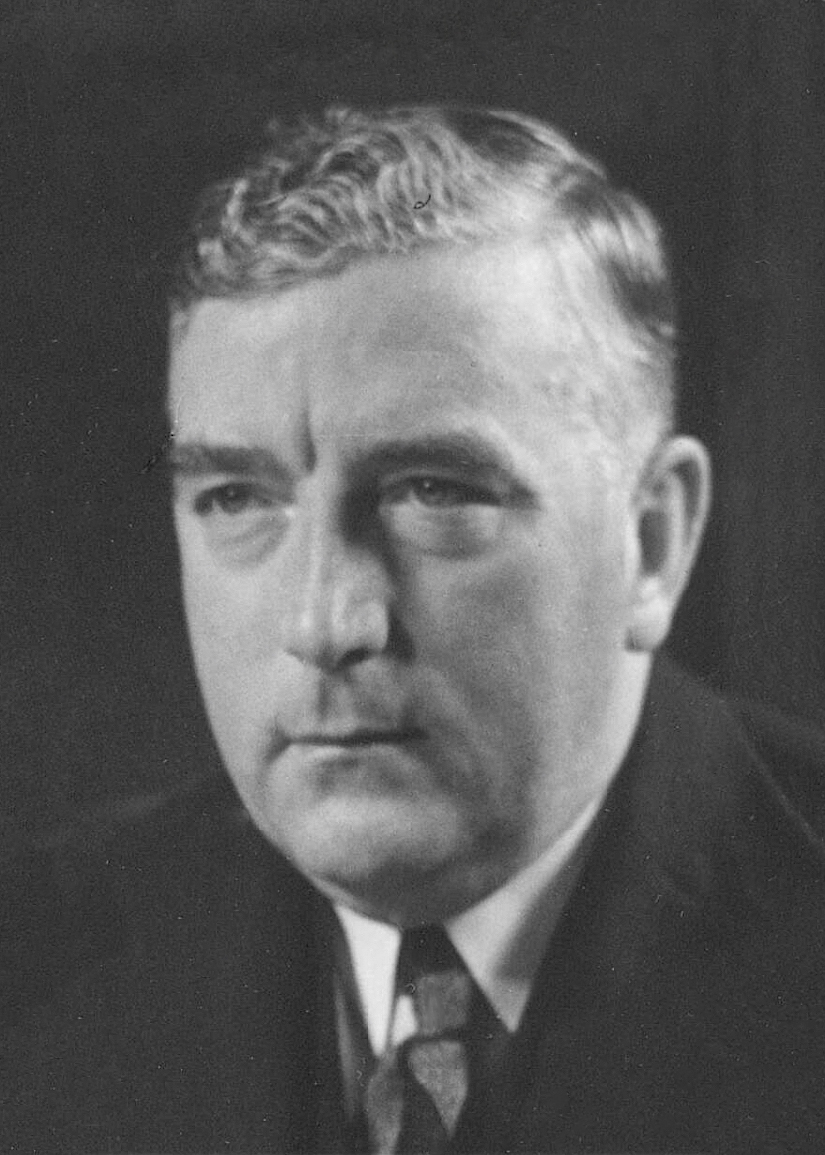
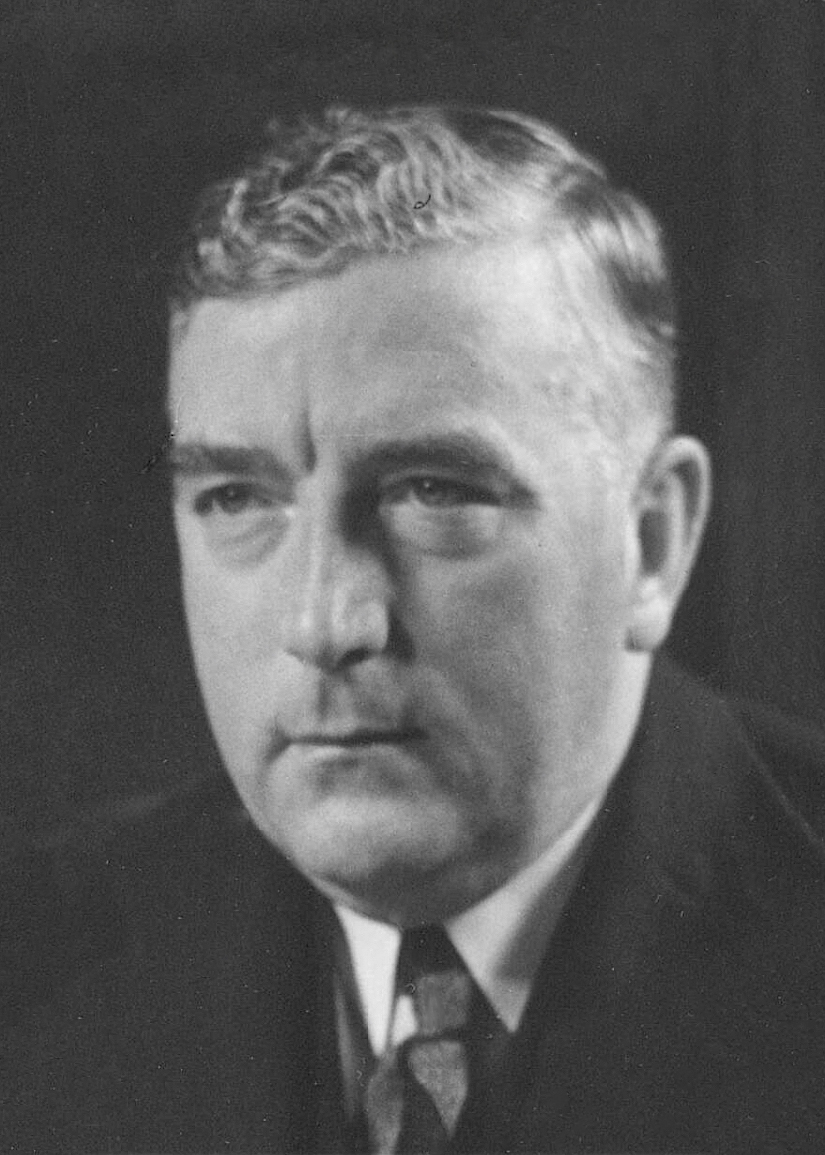
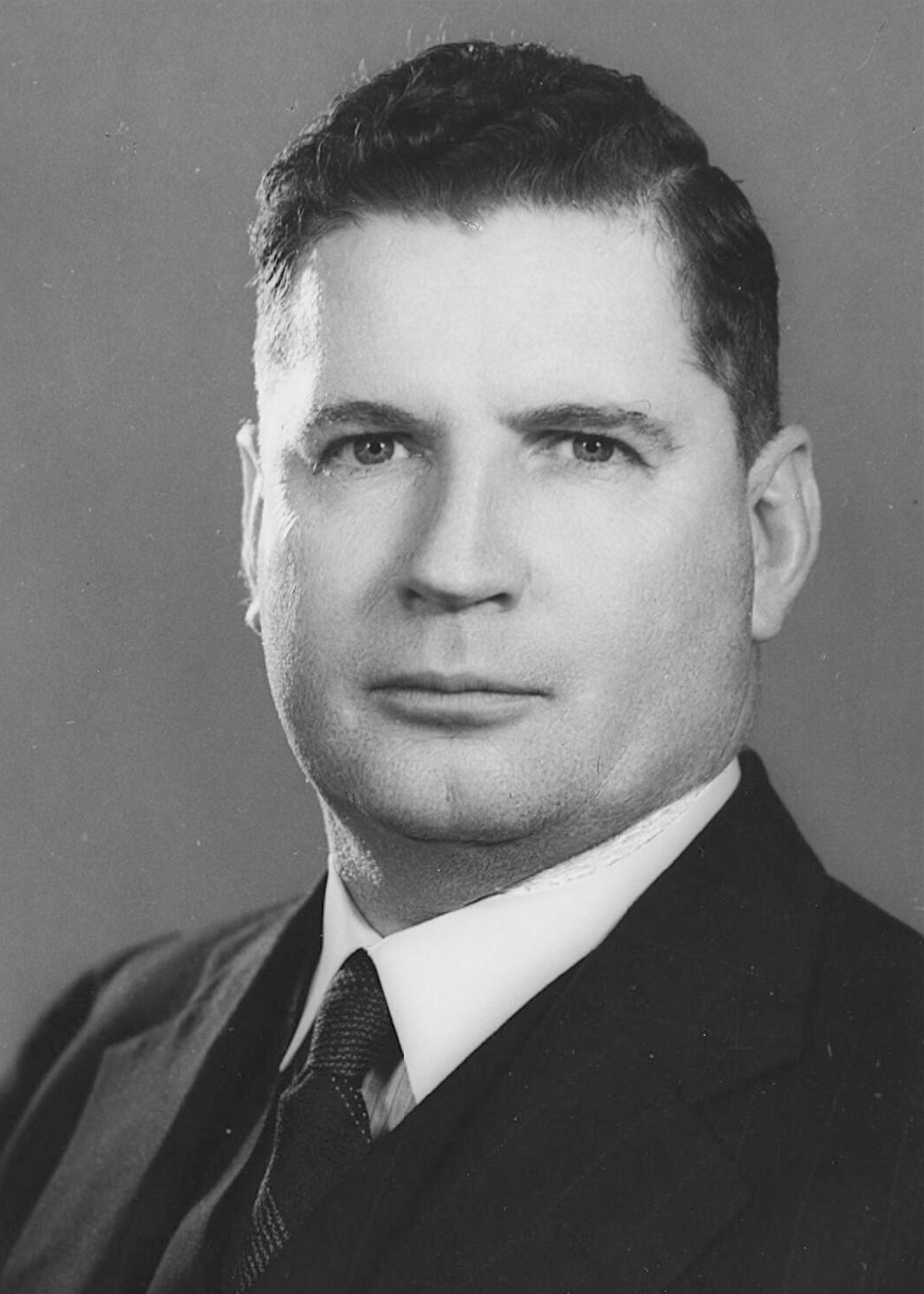
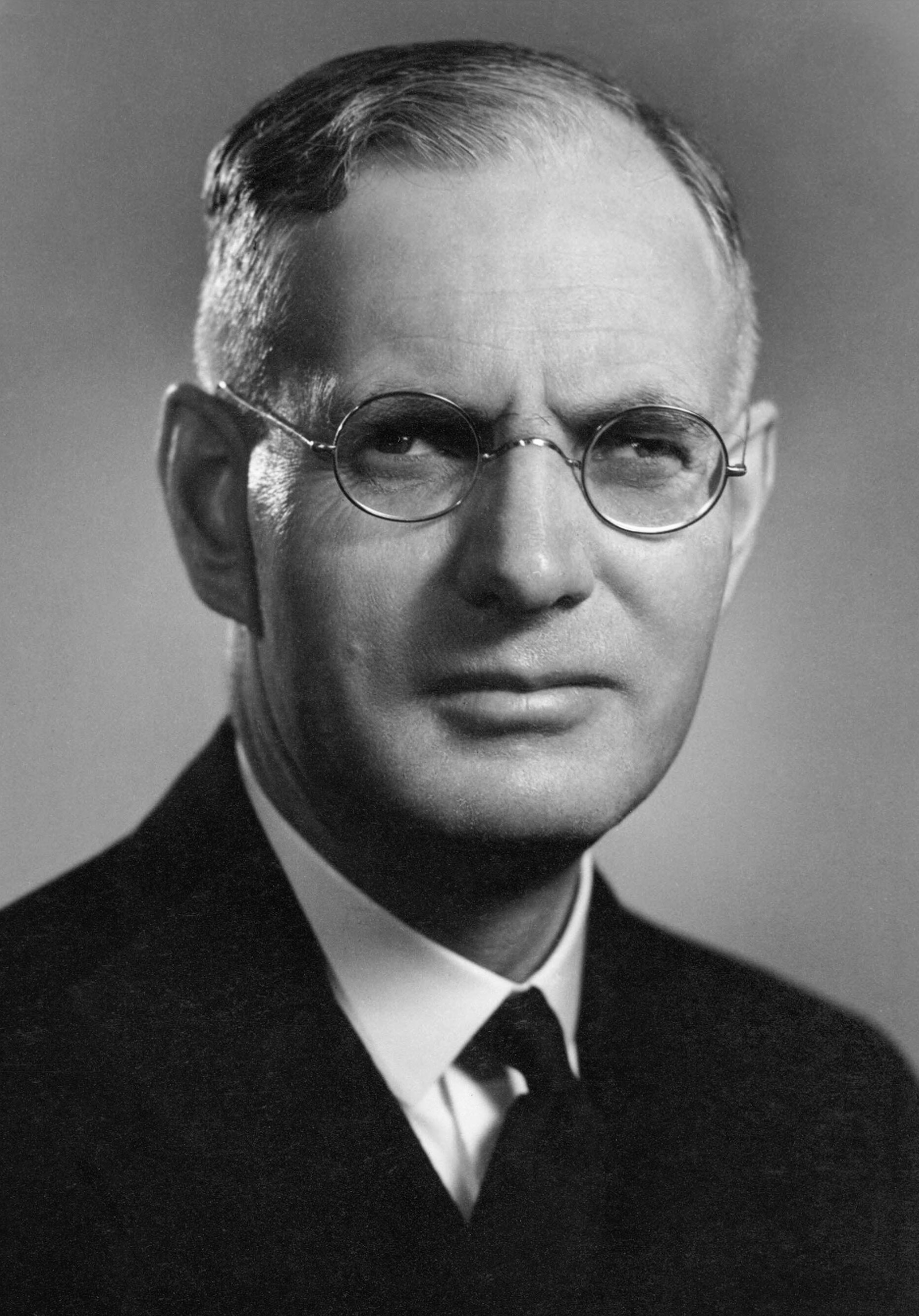
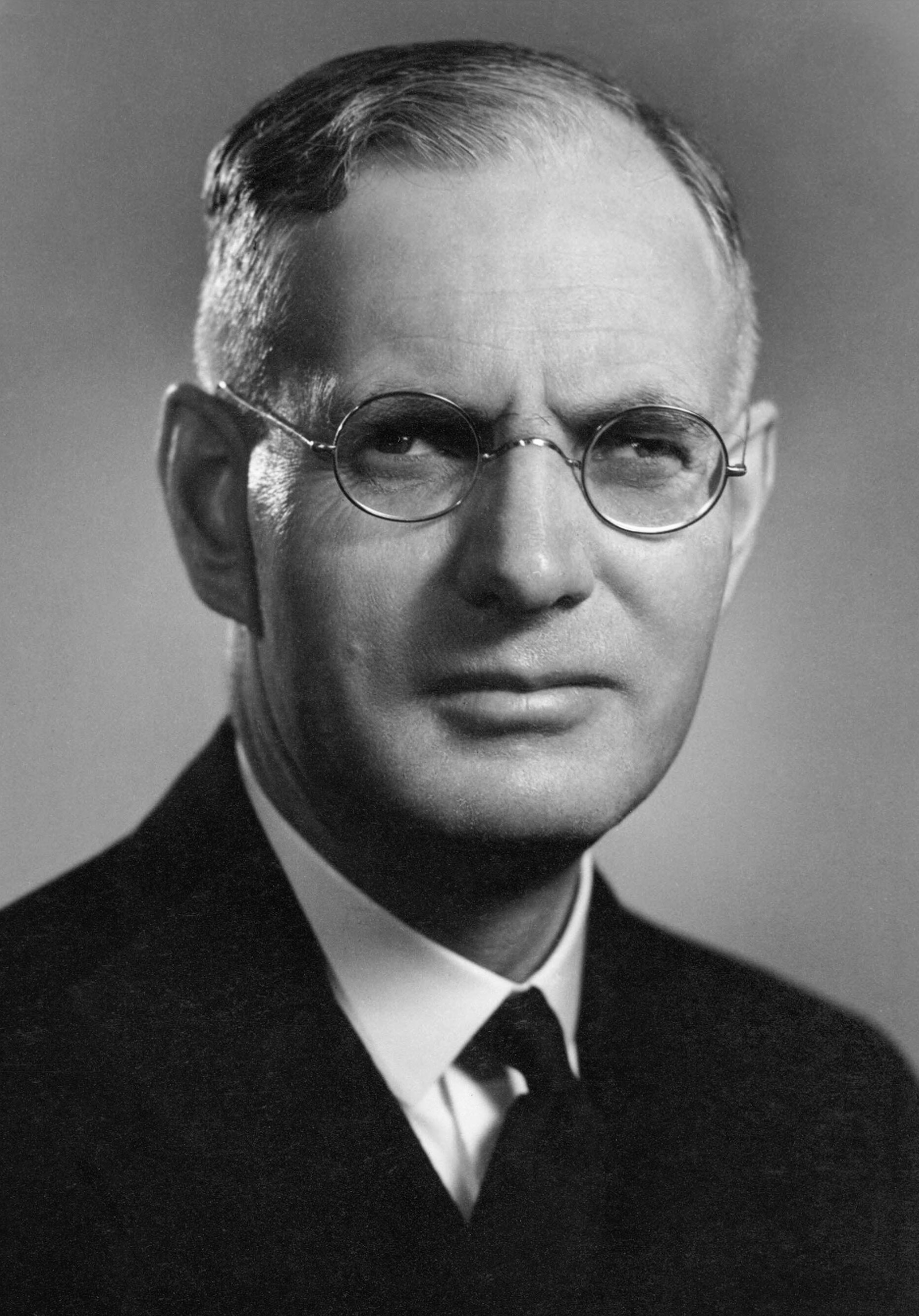
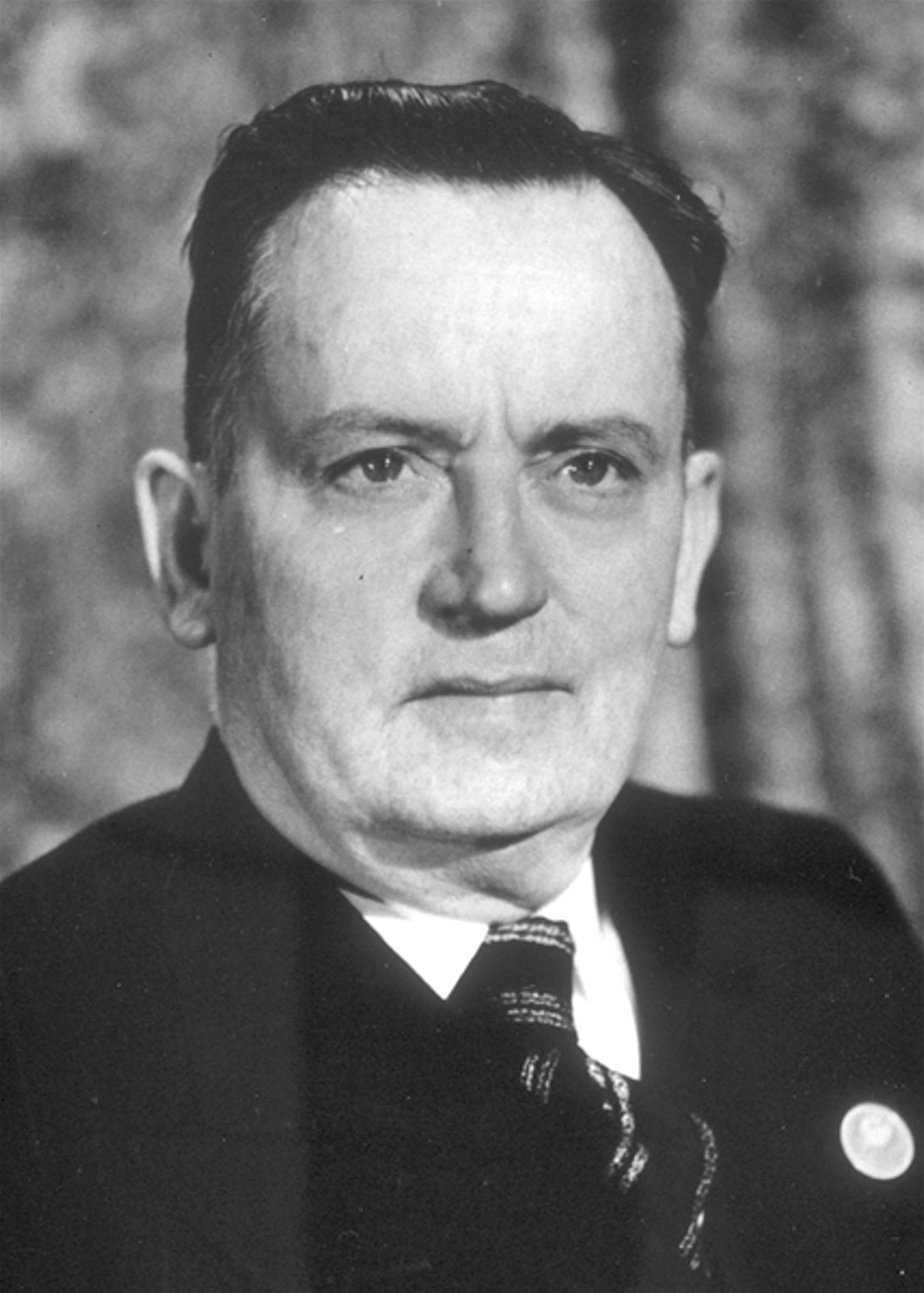
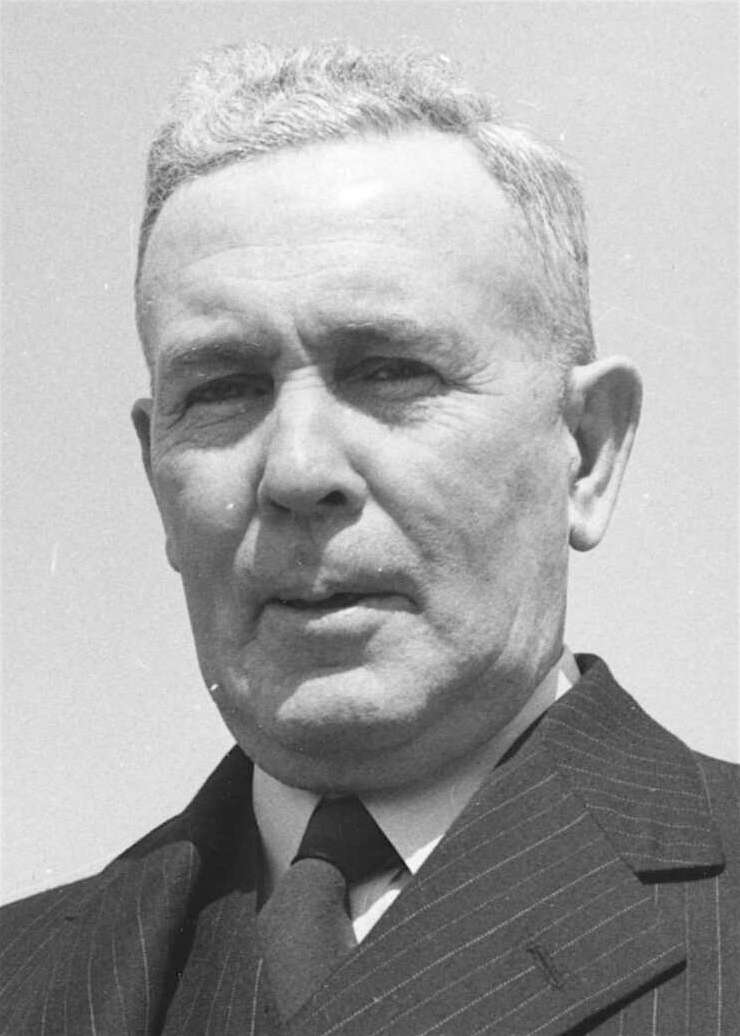
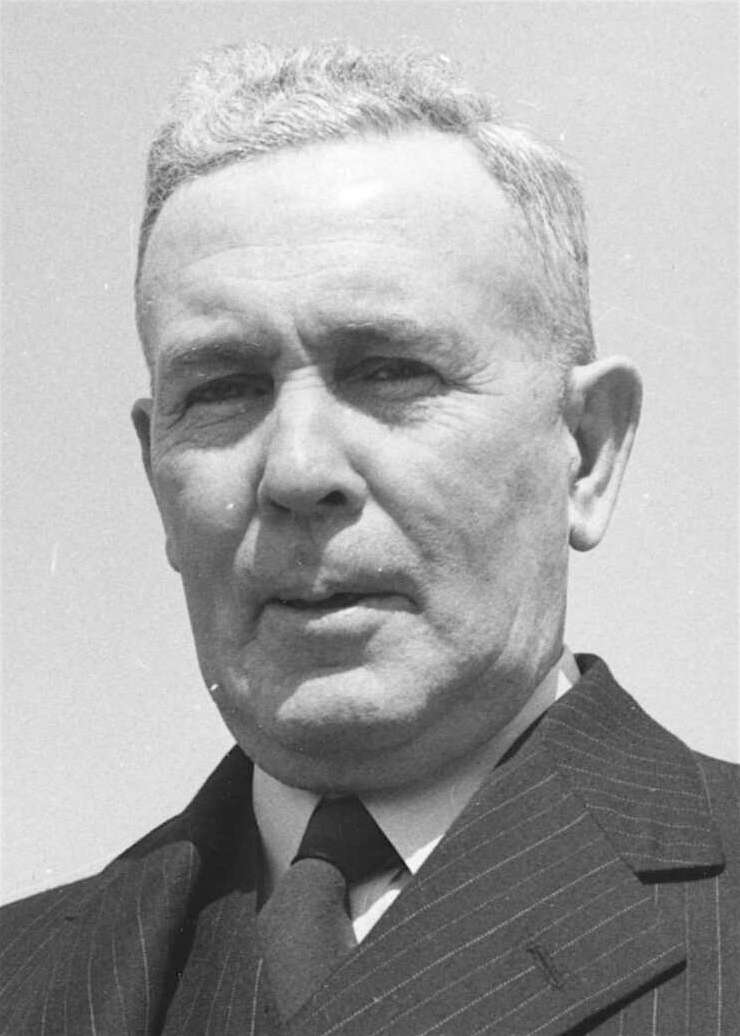
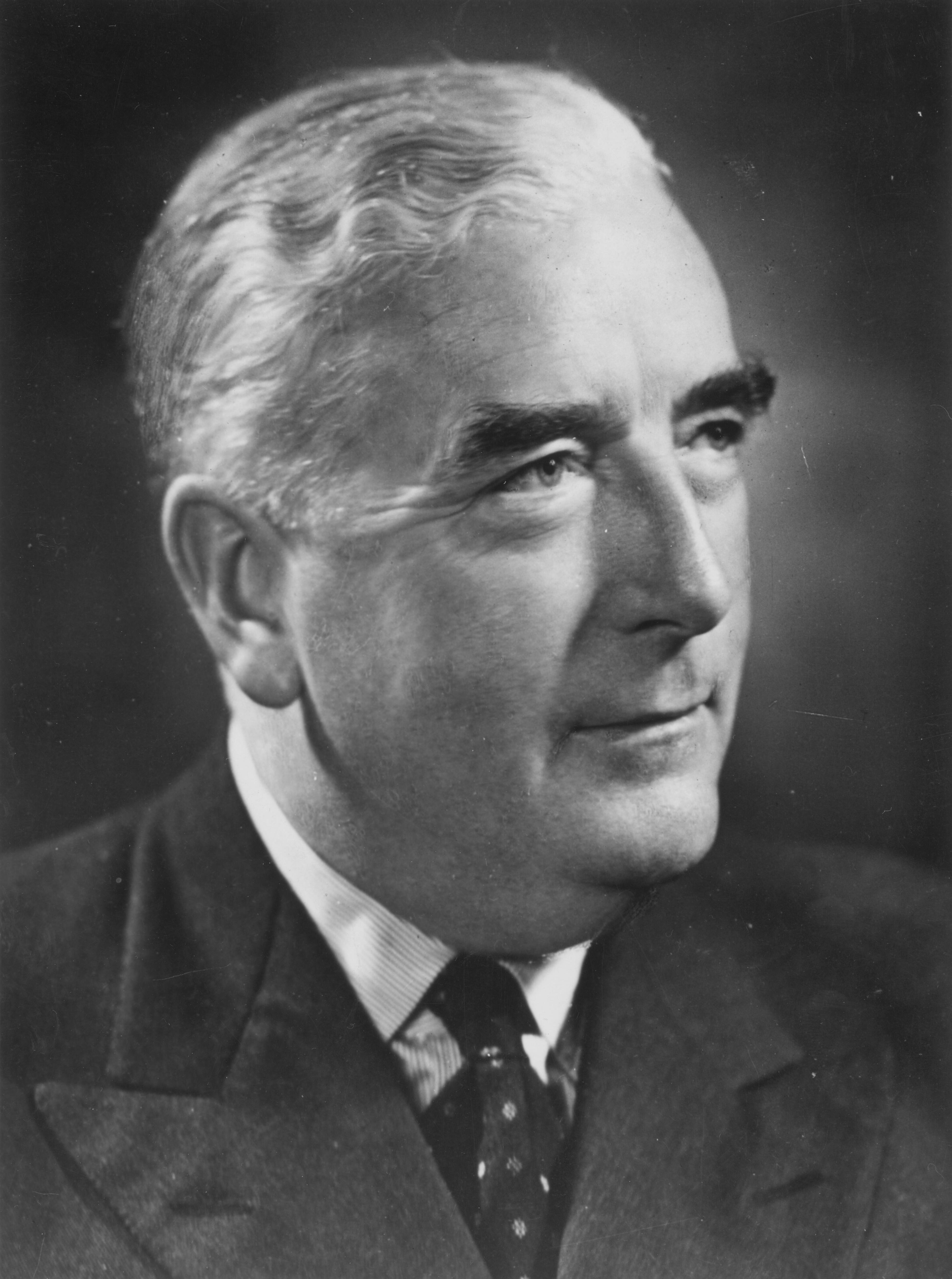
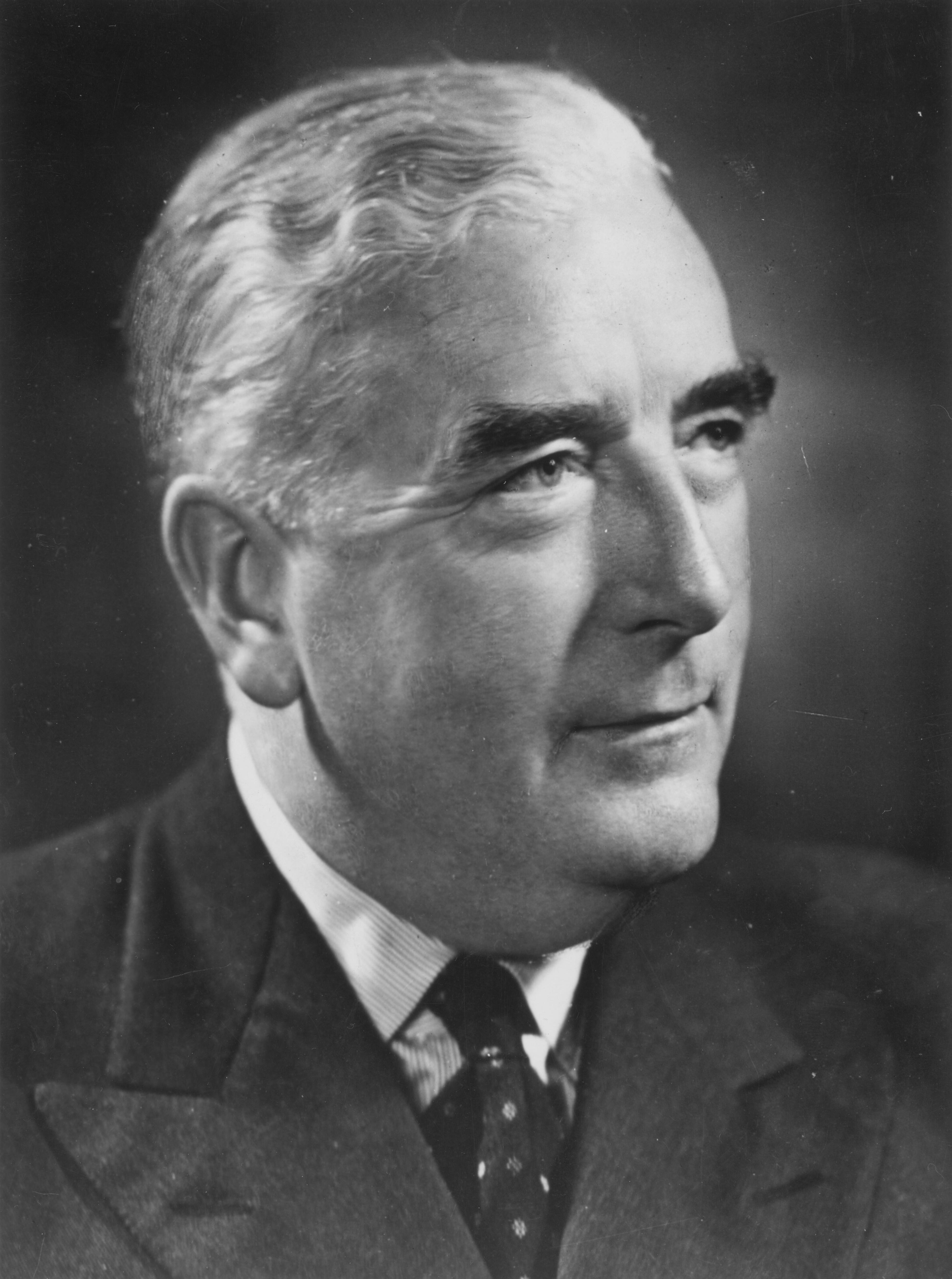
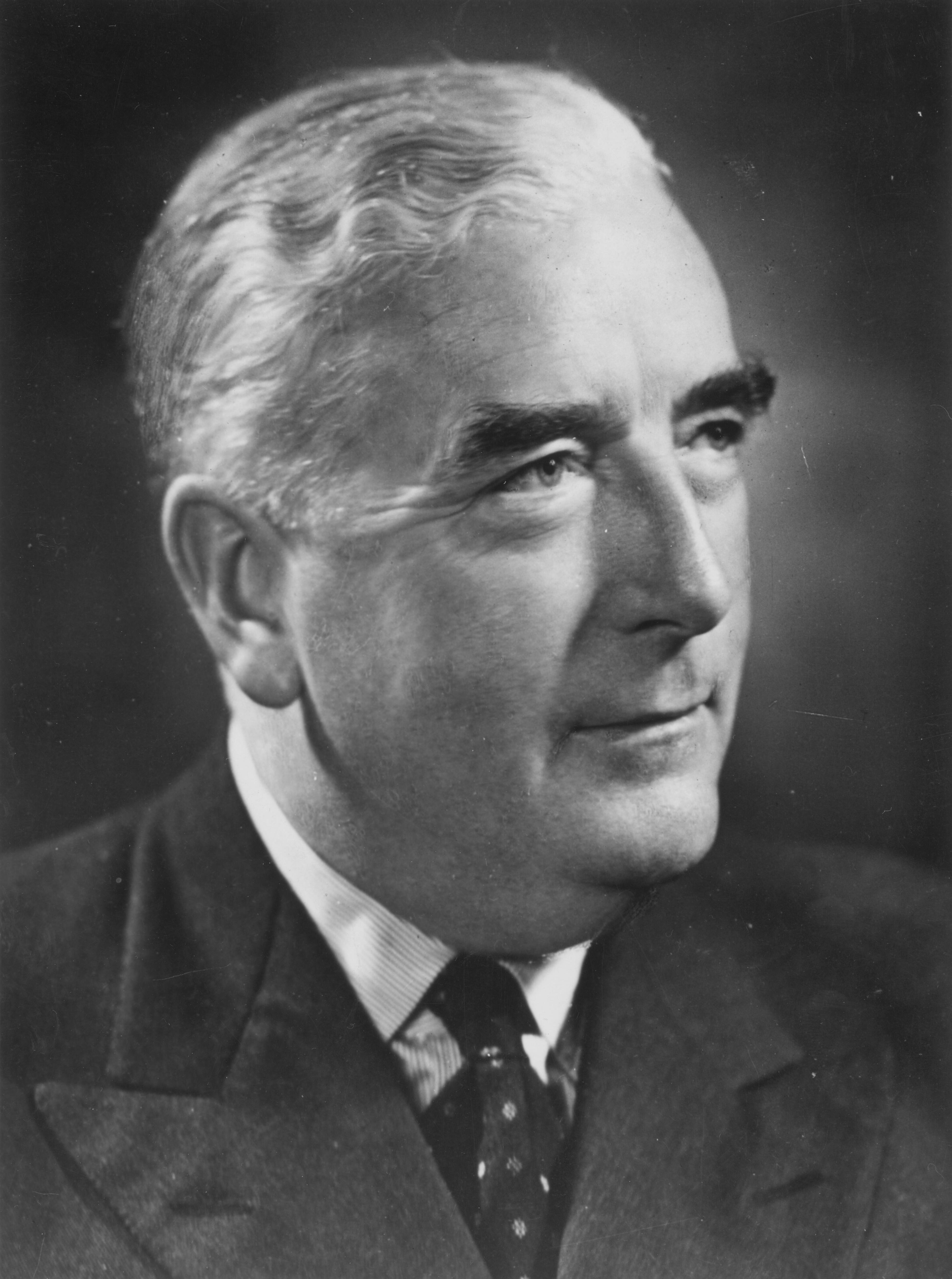
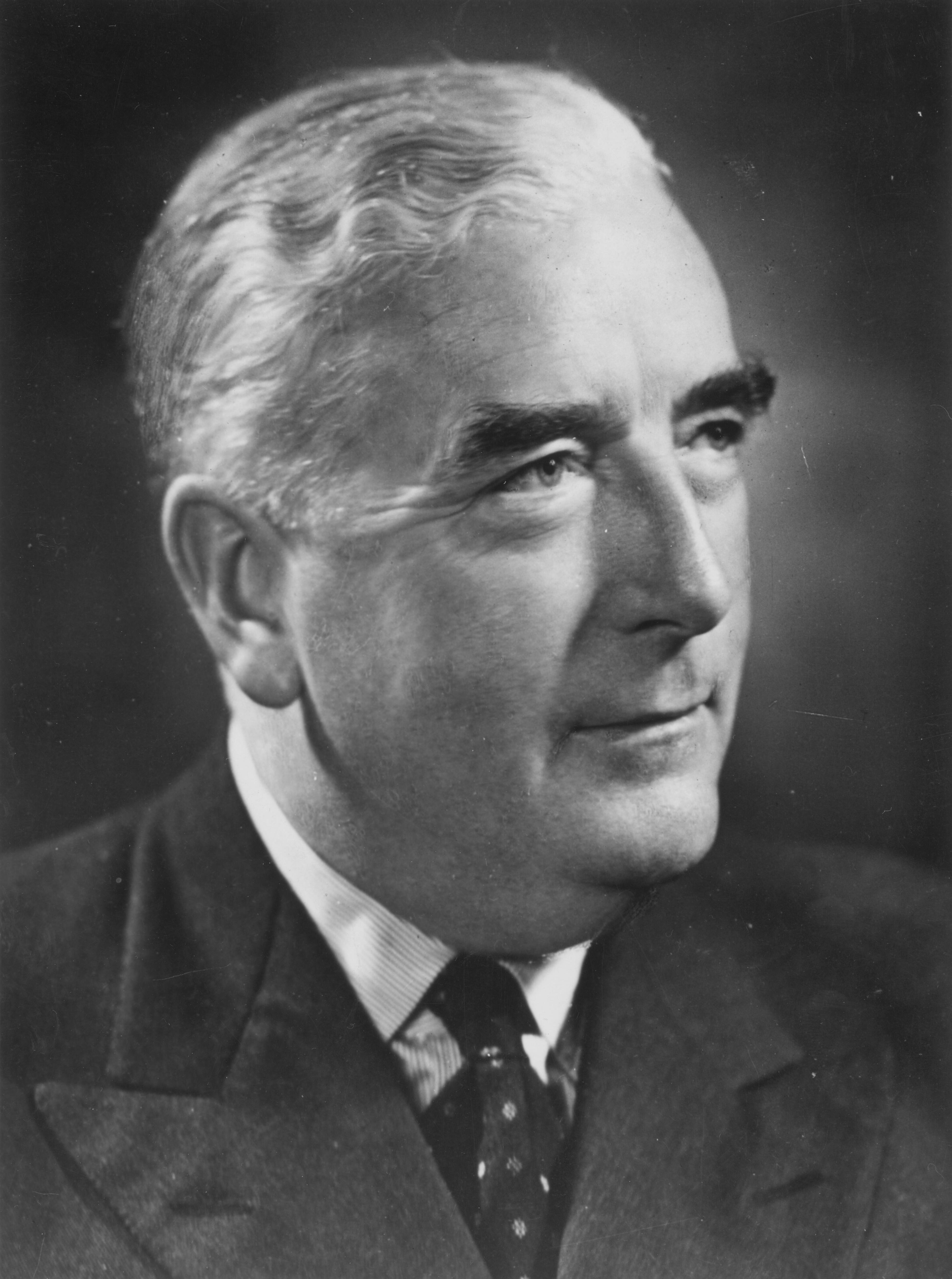
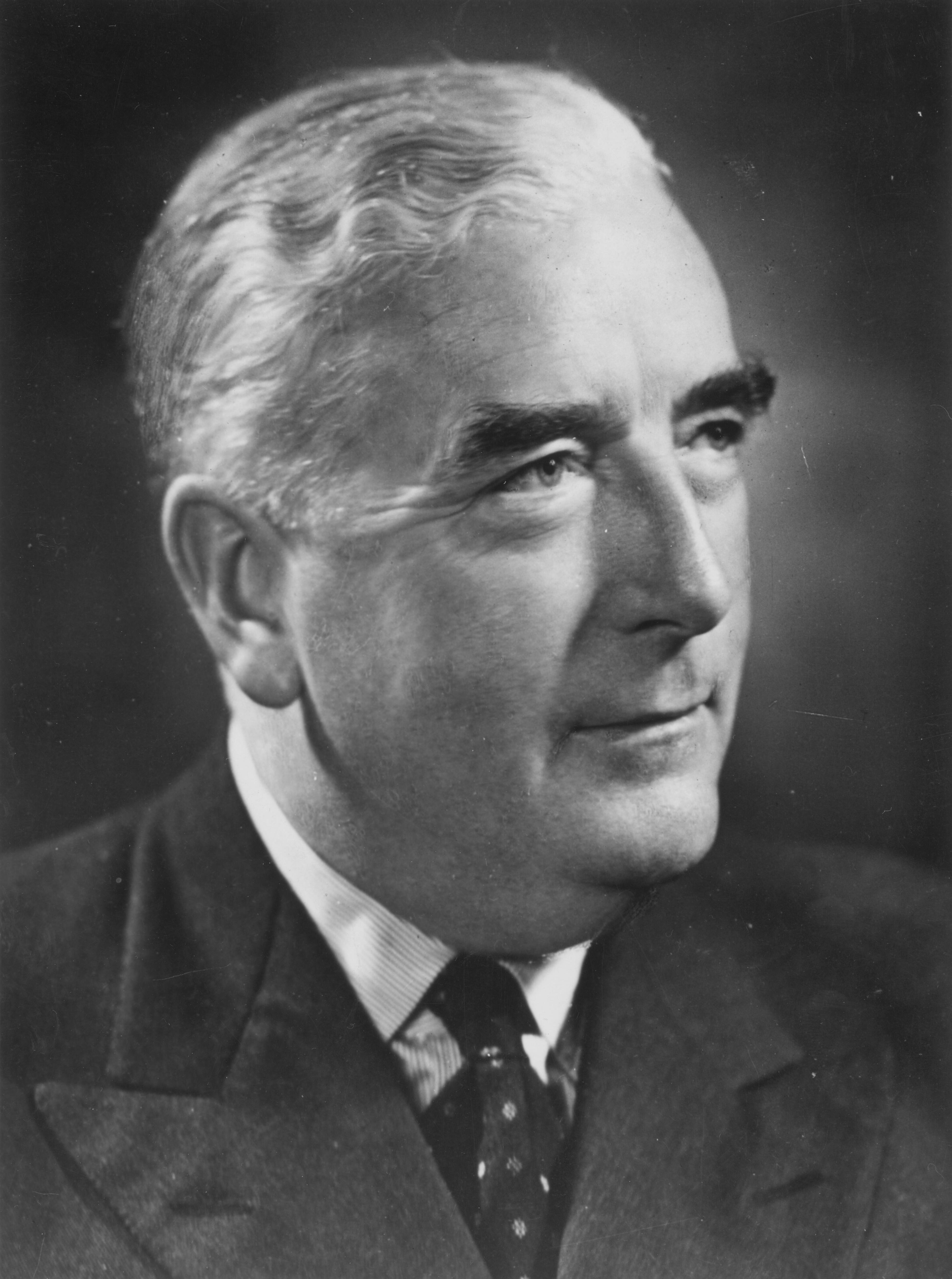
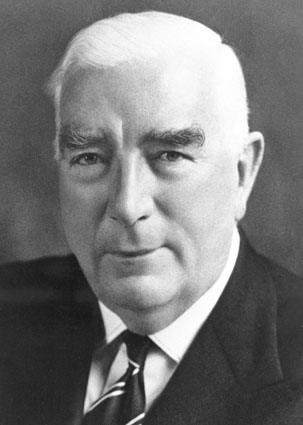
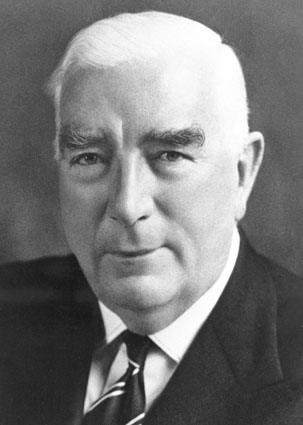
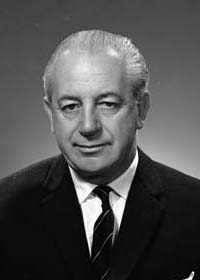
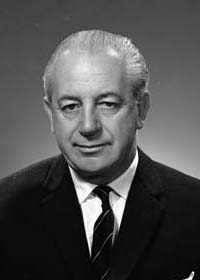
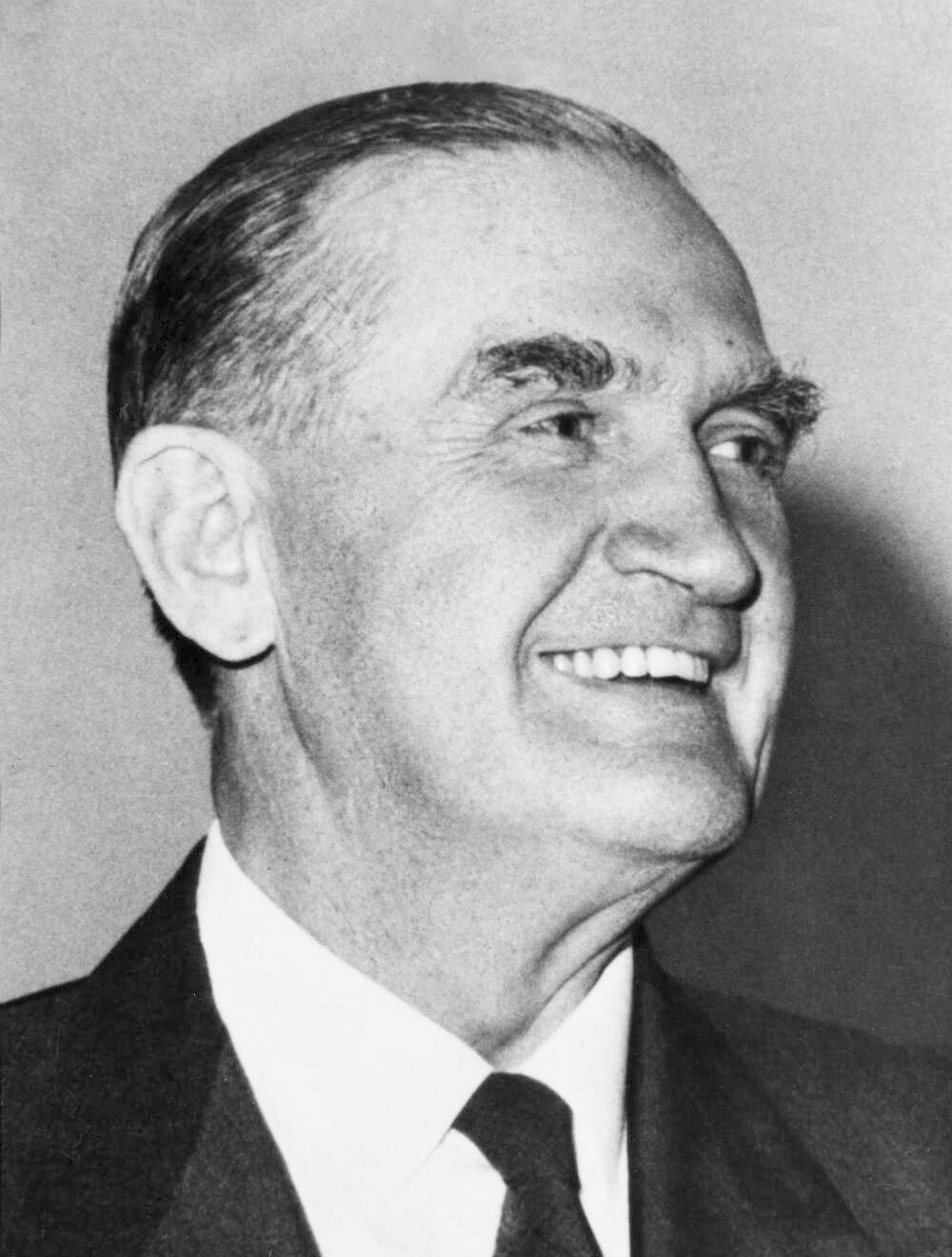
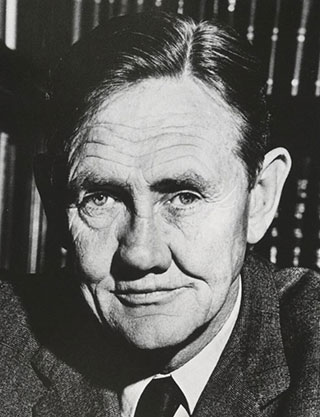
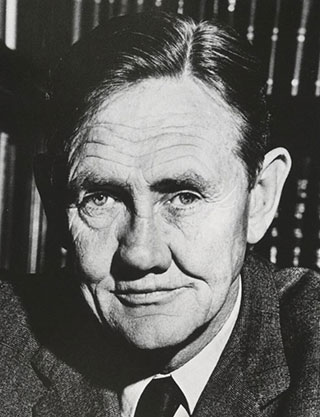
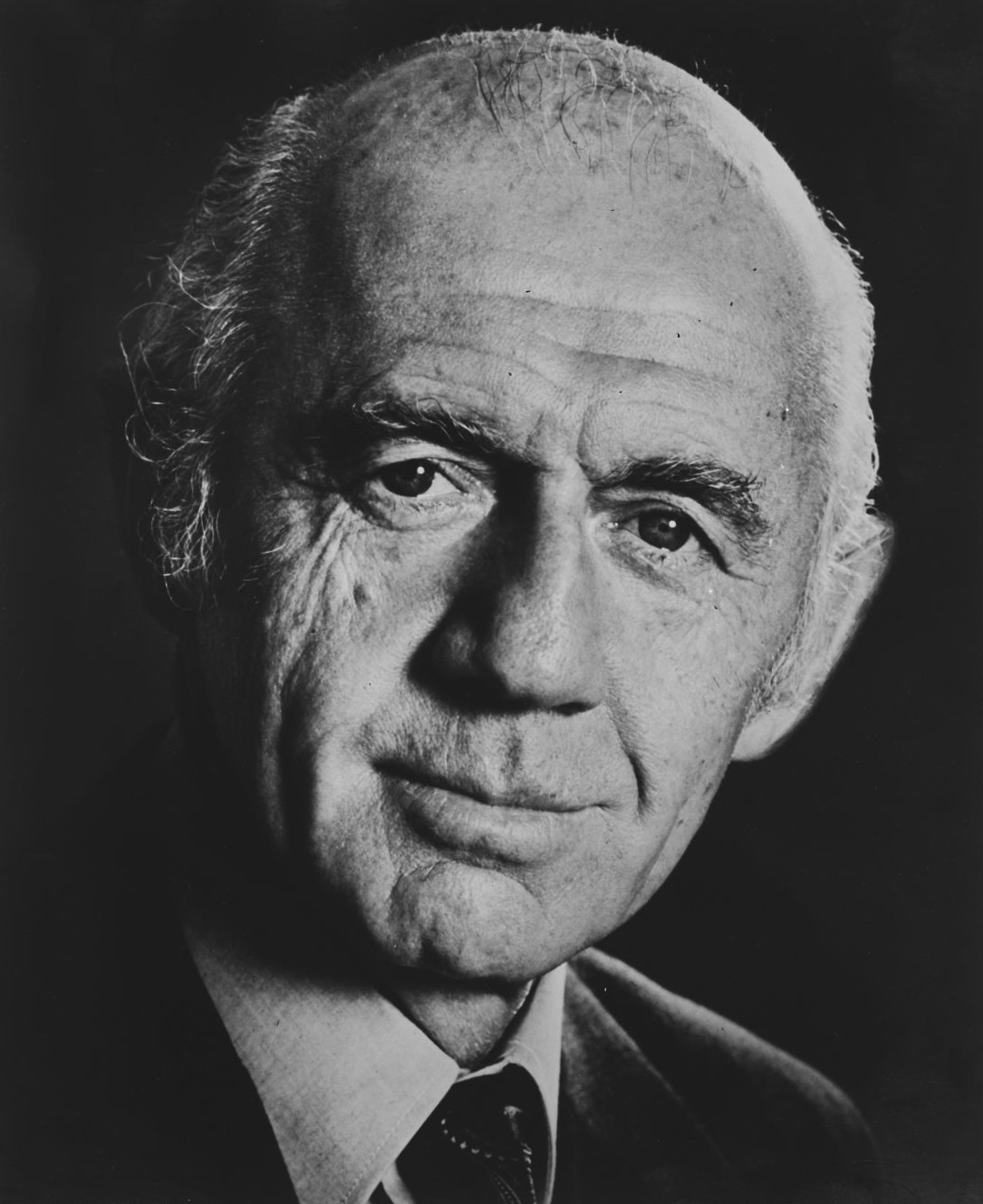
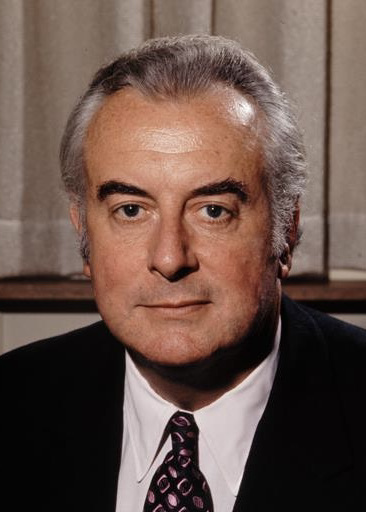
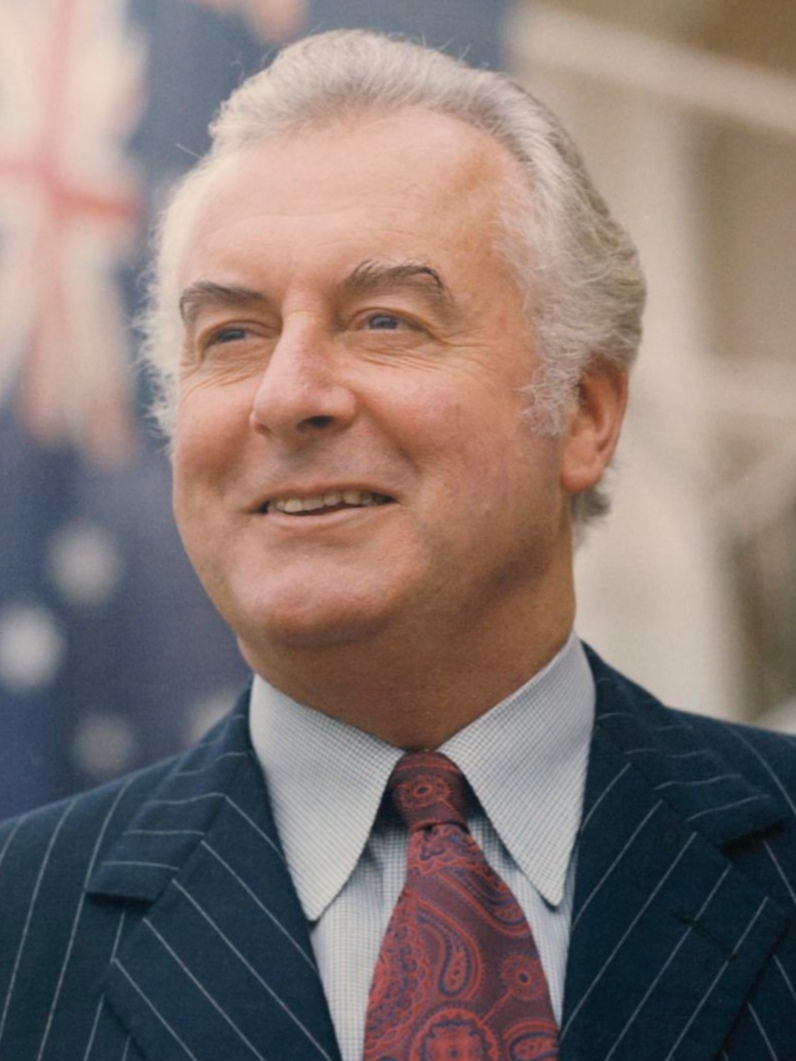
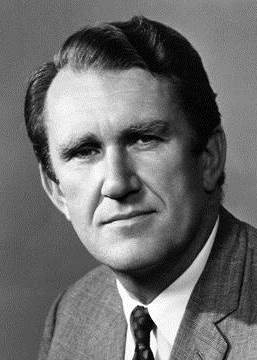
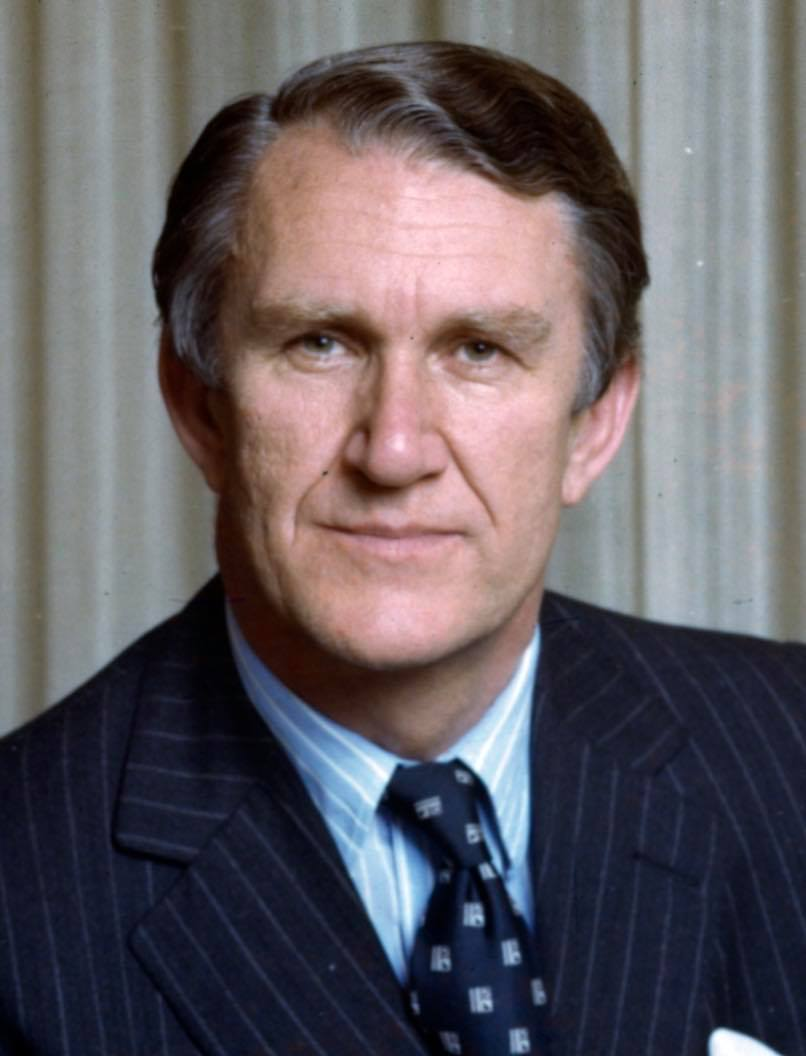
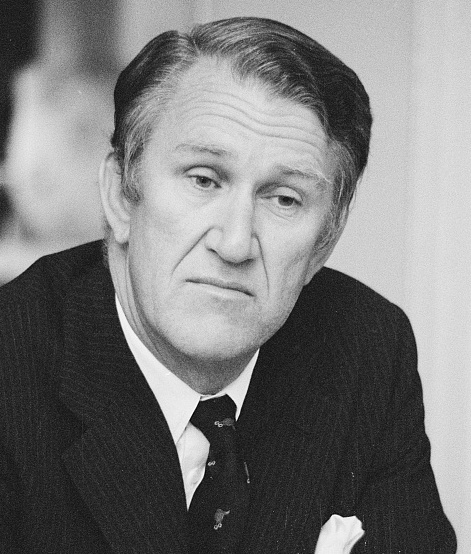
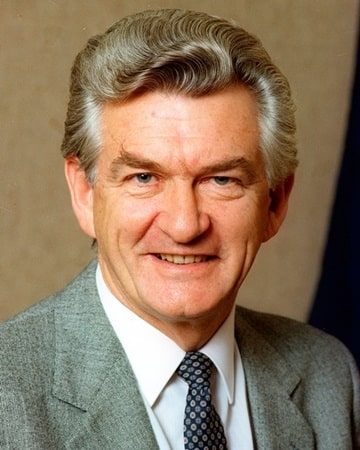
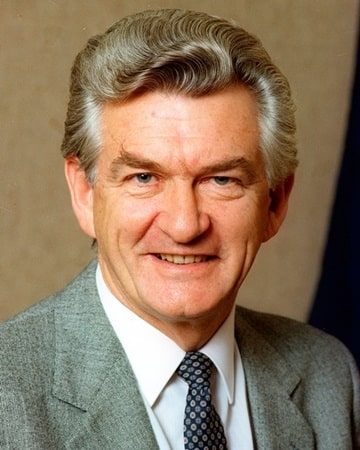
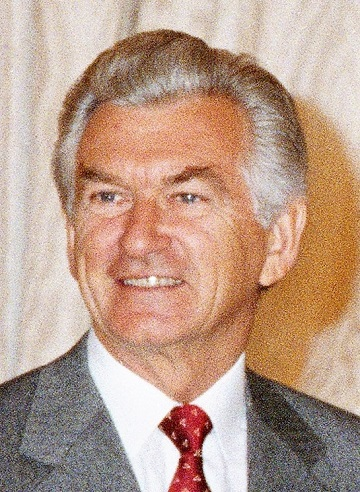
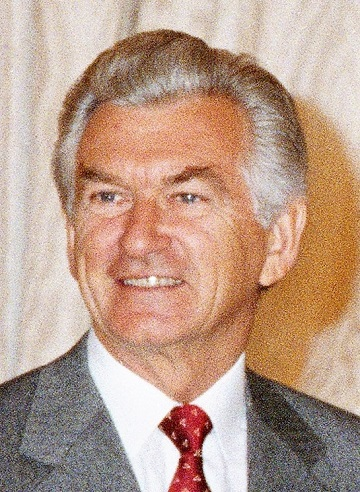
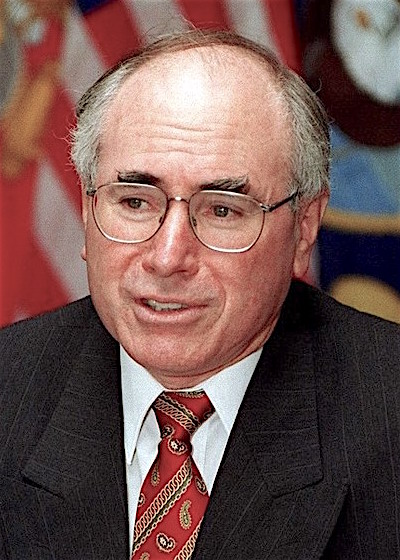
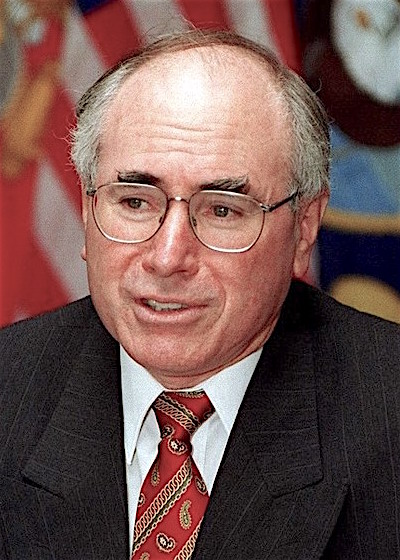
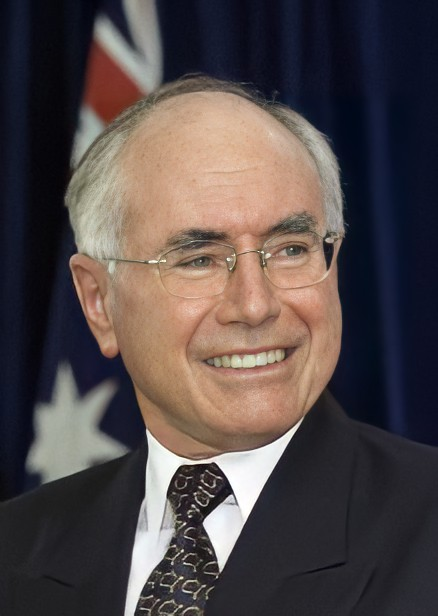
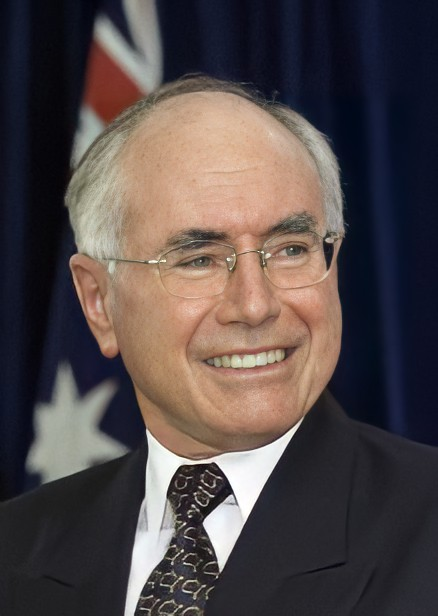
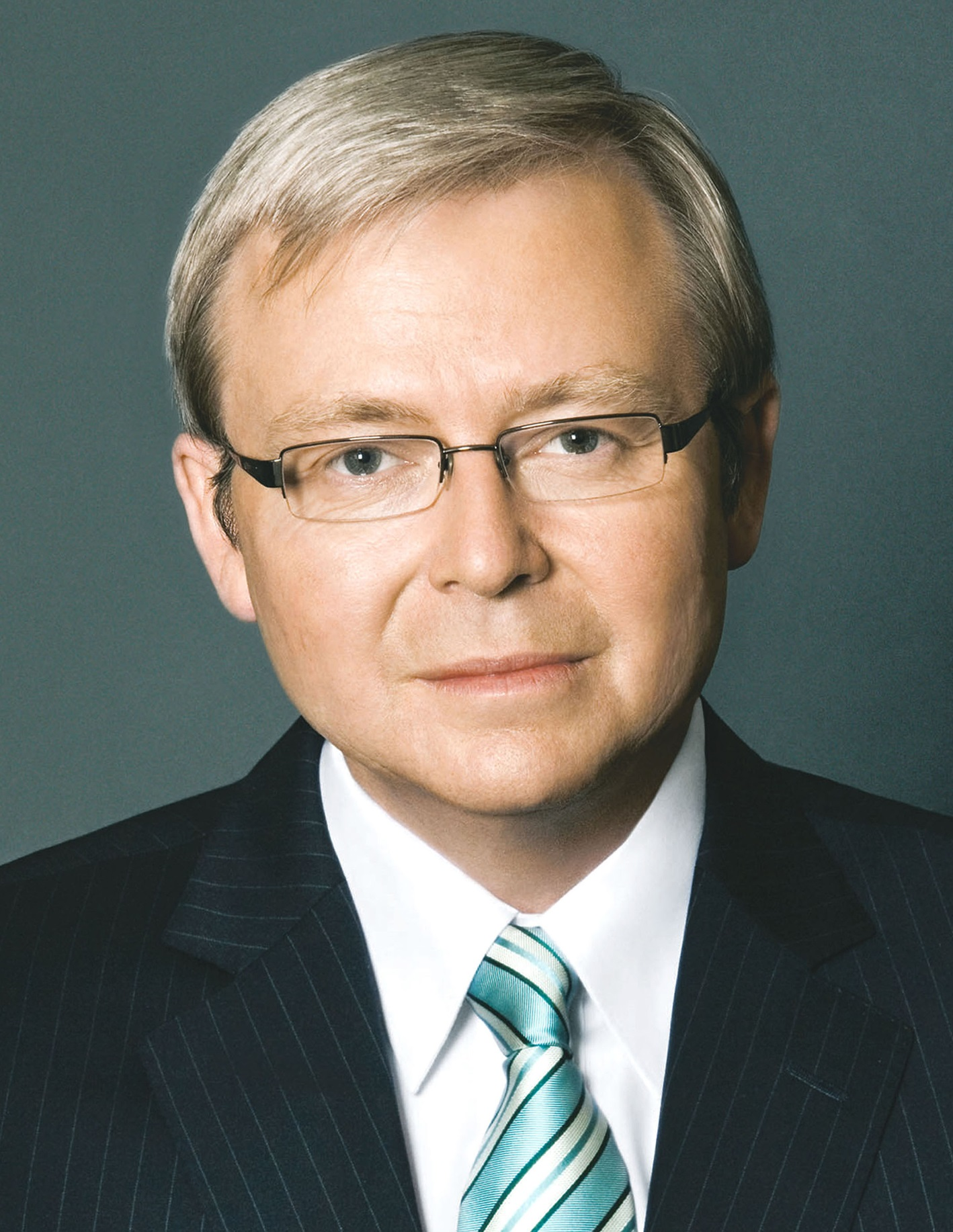
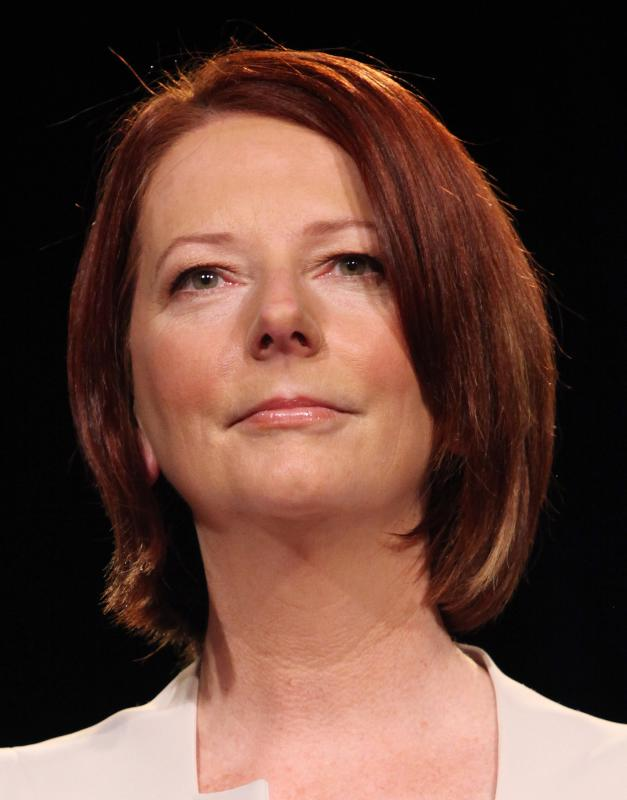
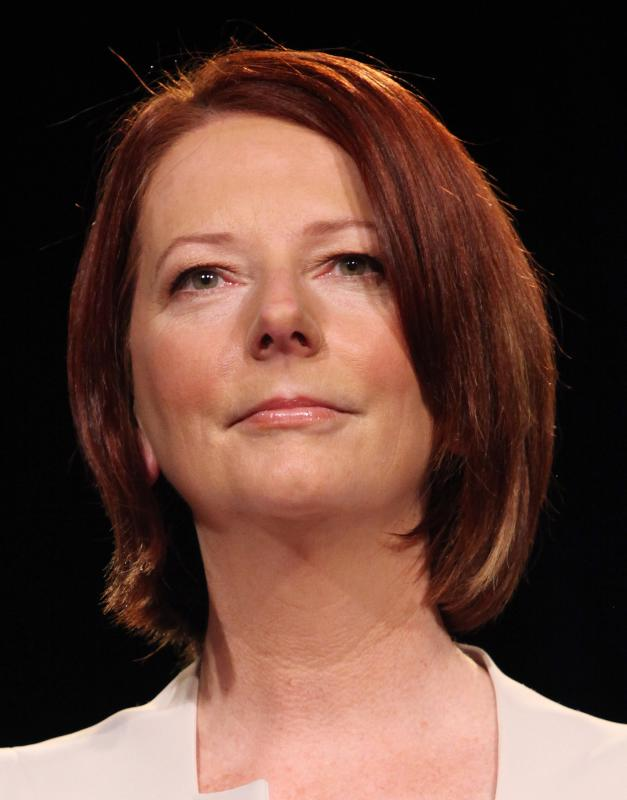
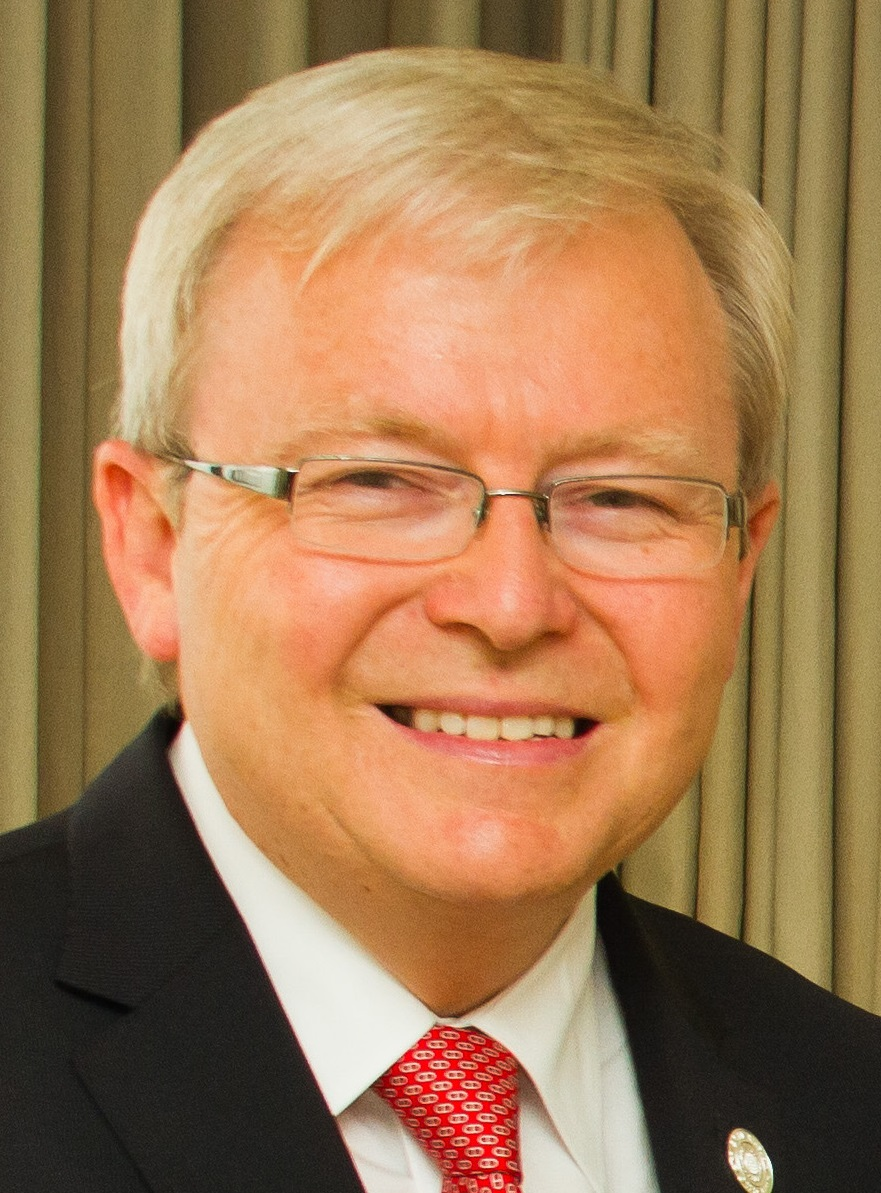
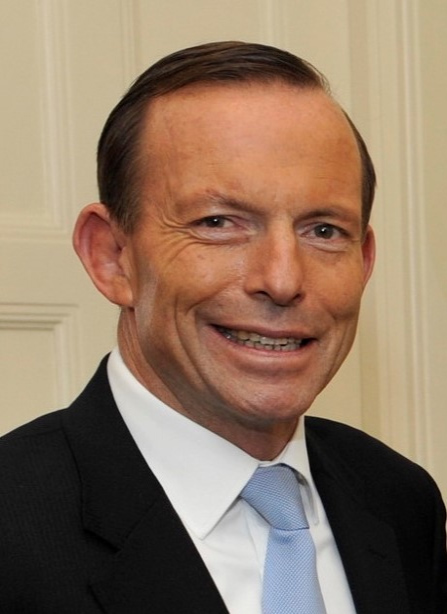
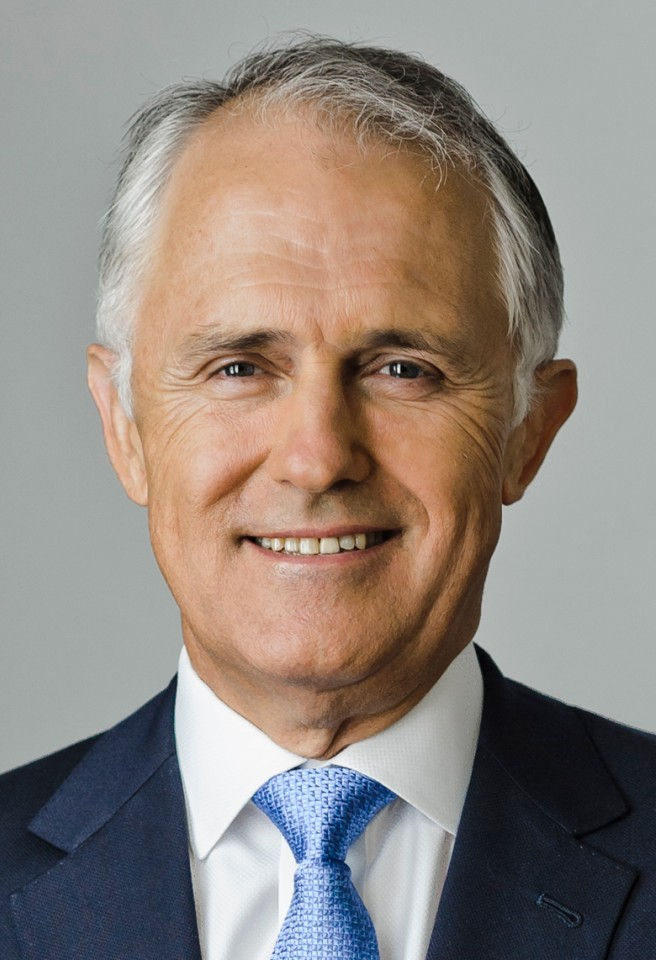
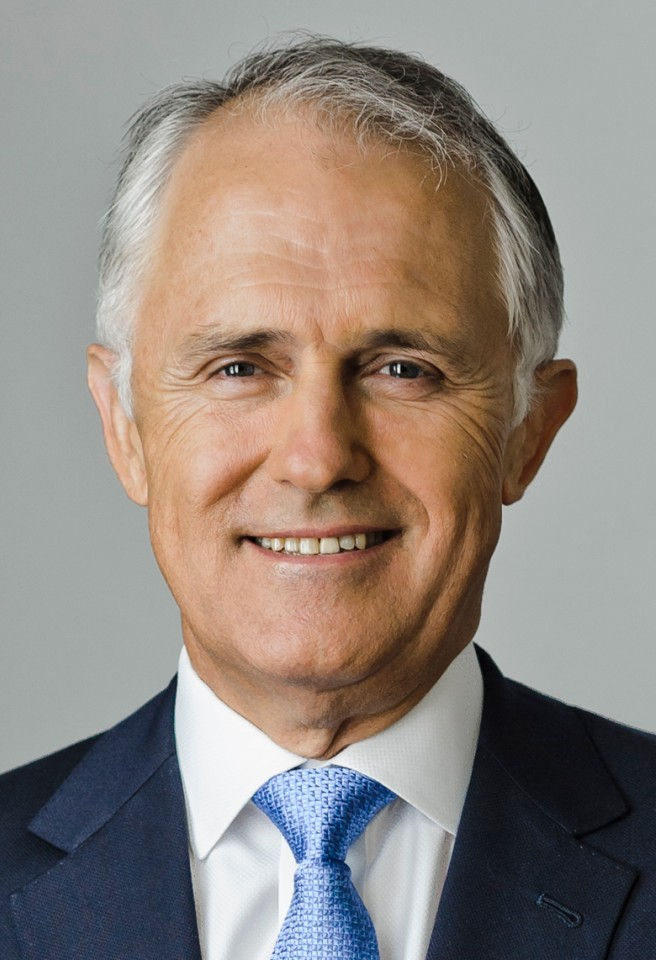
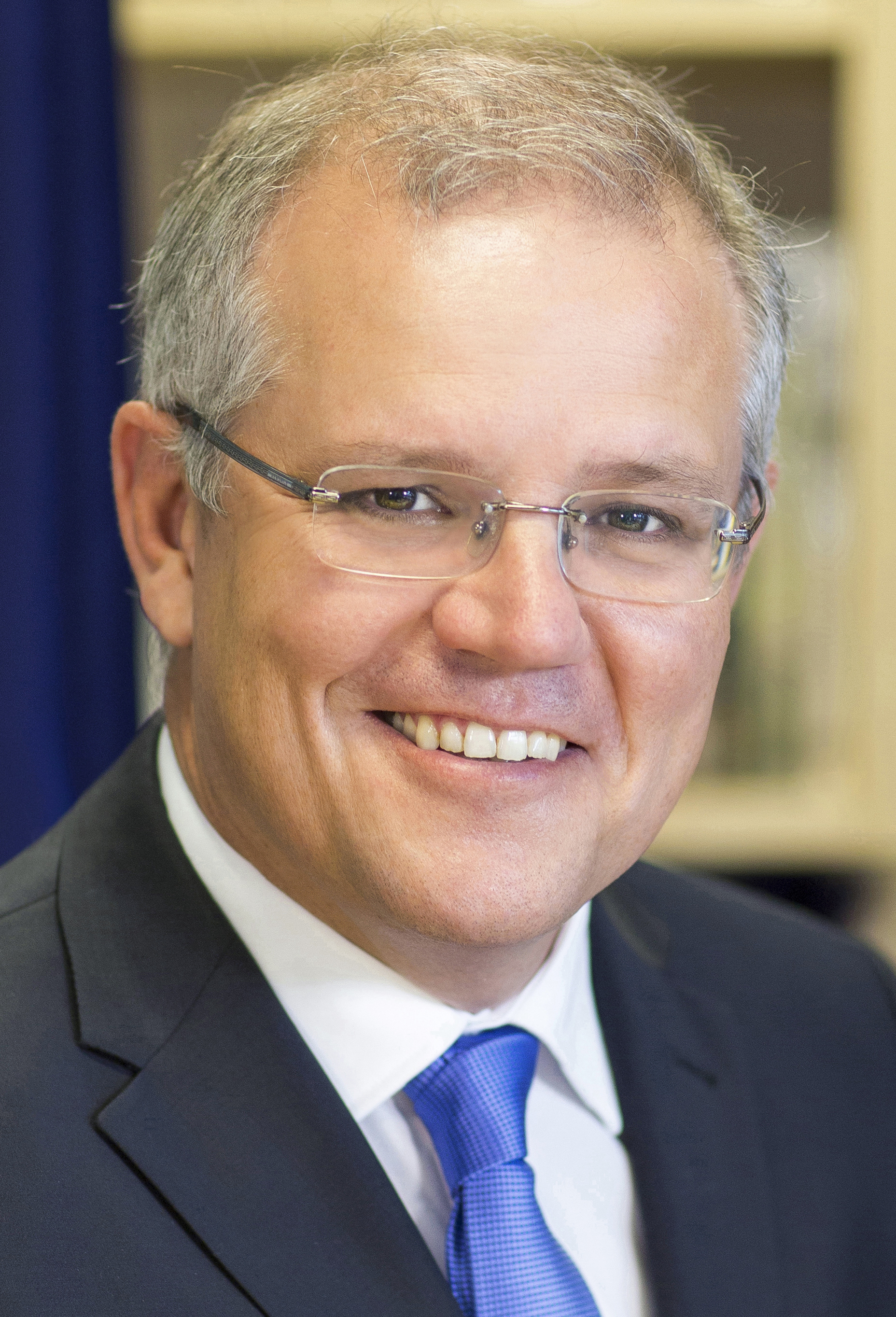
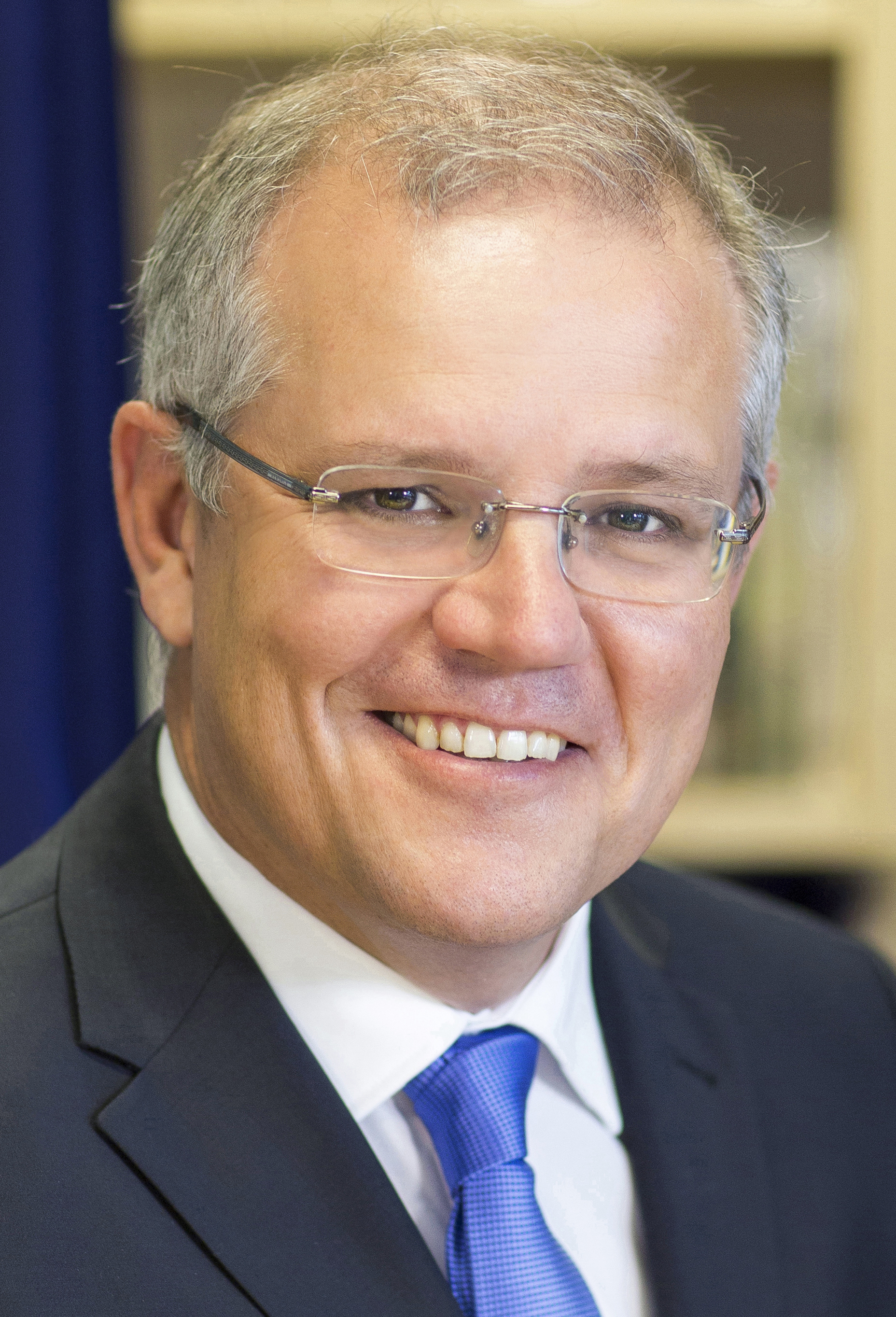
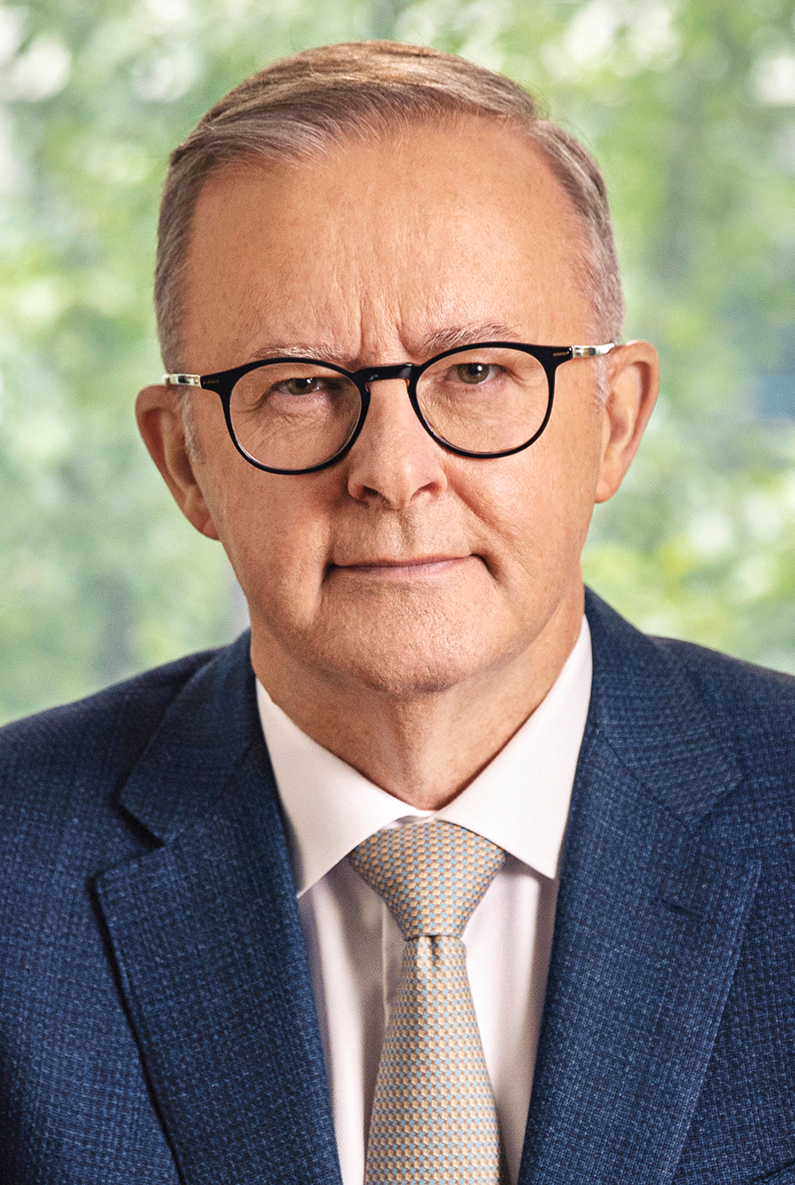
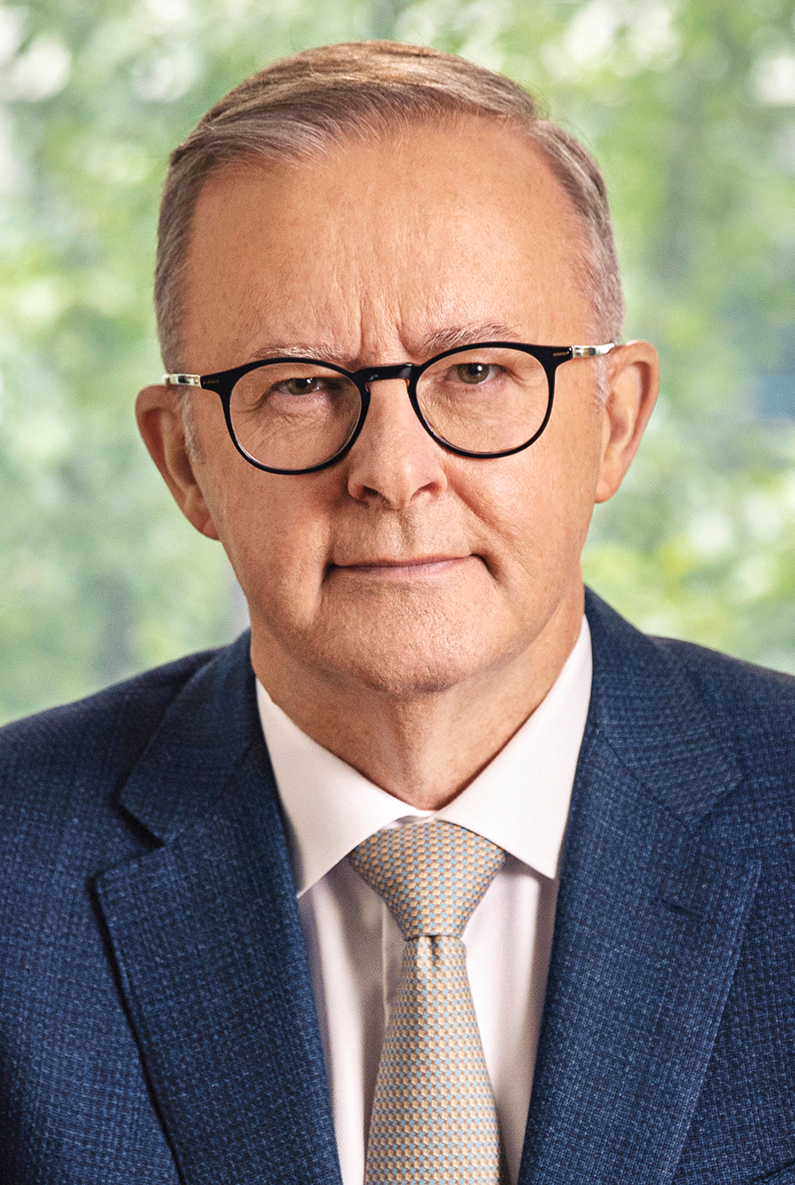
Election Year		Prime Minister	Summary	Labor	Free Trade	Protectionist	-	Independent	Other parties		Total seats
1st	1901	Sir Edmund Barton (1849–1920)	The **Protectionists** do not gain a majority, and form a minority government with **Labor** support, while George Reid's Free Traders form the opposition.	14	28	**31**		2			75
Election Year		Prime Minister	Summary	Labor	Free Trade	Protectionist	-	Independent	Other parties		Total seats
2nd	1903	Alfred Deakin (1856–1919) Chris Watson (1867–1941); Sir George Reid (1845–1918); Alfred Deakin (1856–1919)	**Protectionist** Alfred Deakin forms a minority government with **Labor**, but the coalition splits over a dispute on the Conciliation and Arbitration Bill. Free Trade leader George Reid declines Government, so the Governor-General commissions **Labor** leader Chris Watson to form Government. Watson resigns four months later and Free Trade forms Government under Reid, finally passing the Conciliation and Arbitration Act five months later. **Labor** and the **Protectionists** return to Government in 1905 when Reid loses the confidence of the parliament.	23	25	**26**			1	Revenue Tariff	75
Election Year		Prime Minister	Summary	Labor	Anti-Socialist	Protectionist	-	Independent	Other parties		Total seats
3rd	1906	Alfred Deakin (1856–1919) Andrew Fisher (1862–1928); Alfred Deakin (1856–1919)	**Protectionist** Alfred Deakin forms another minority government, which remains in power largely due to the Anti-Socialists reluctance to pass a vote of no-confidence in it. Deakin loses Labor's support in late 1908 and Andrew Fisher of the **Labor Party** becomes Prime Minister. Alfred Deakin regains the Prime Ministership as leader of the new Commonwealth Liberal Party.	26	27	**16**		1	1	Western Australian	75
Election Year		Prime Minister	Summary	Labor	Commonwealth Liberal	-	-	Independent	Other parties		Total seats
4th	1910	Andrew Fisher (1862–1928)	**Labor** wins control of the House of Representatives and the Senate under Andrew Fisher, becoming Australia's first elected federal majority.	**43**	31			1			75
Election Year		Prime Minister	Summary	Labor	Commonwealth Liberal	-	-	Independent	Other parties		Total seats
5th	1913	Joseph Cook (1860–1947)	The **Commonwealth Liberals** win a one-seat majority under Joseph Cook while Labor retains control of the Senate.	37	**38**						75
Election Year		Prime Minister	Summary	Labor	Commonwealth Liberal	-	-	Independent	Other parties		Total seats
6th	1914	Andrew Fisher (1862–1928) Billy Hughes (1862–1952)	**Labor** forms a government under Andrew Fisher after the double dissolution election, where World War I breaks out in the middle of the campaign. Fisher resigns due to ill-health, and **Labor** forms government under Billy Hughes. Hughes – a strong advocate of conscription – holds a national plebiscite on conscription to give his stance legitimacy. The plebiscite is defeated. On the 15 September 1916, Hughes is expelled from the Labor party. Hughes briefly forms the **National Labor Party** and forms Government, but then merges with the Commonwealth Liberal Party to form the **Nationalist Party**, with Hughes as Prime Minister and Joseph Cook as his deputy.	**42**	32			1			75
Election Year		Prime Minister	Summary	Labor	Nationalist	-	-	Independent	Other parties		Total seats
7th	1917	Billy Hughes (1862–1952)	The **Nationalists** form a government under Billy Hughes. A second plebiscite on conscription is held and is defeated again in 1917.	22	**53**						75
Election Year		Prime Minister	Summary	Labor	Nationalist	Various Agrarian Parties	-	Independent	Other parties		Total seats
8th	1919	Billy Hughes (1862–1952)	The **Nationalists** form another government under Billy Hughes with Independent support. First election held under **Instant-runoff voting**.	26	**37**	11		1			75
Election Year		Prime Minister	Summary	Labor	Nationalist	Country	-	Independent	Other parties		Total seats
9th	1922	Billy Hughes (1862–1952) Stanley Bruce (1883–1967)	From around 1920, Hughes lost the support of many of the conservative elements of his party. **The Nationalists** lose their majority in the election. Earle Page declares that his Country Party will not serve under Hughes, forcing Hughes to resign a month after his re-election. His Treasurer Stanley Bruce forms a coalition Government with the Country Party.	29	**26**	14		1	5	Liberal	75
Election Year		Prime Minister	Summary	Labor	Nationalist	Country	-	Independent	Other parties		Total seats
10th	1925	Stanley Bruce (1883–1967)	The **Coalition** of **Nationalists** and the **Country Party** forms another government under Stanley Bruce.	23	**37**	**14**		1			75
Election Year		Prime Minister	Summary	Labor	Nationalist	Country	-	Independent	Other parties		Total seats
11th	1928	Stanley Bruce (1883–1967)	The **Coalition** forms another government under Stanley Bruce despite Labor gaining eight seats under Jim Scullin.	31	**29**	**13**		1	1	Country Progressives	75
Election Year		Prime Minister	Summary	Labor	Nationalist	Country	-	Independent	Other parties		Total seats
12th	1929	Jim Scullin (1876–1953)	**Labor** forms a government under Jim Scullin in an election where Prime Minister Stanley Bruce is defeated in his seat of Flinders.	**46**	14	10		4	1	Country Progressives	75
Election Year		Prime Minister	Summary	Labor	United Australia Party	Country	Lang Labor	Independent	Other parties		Total seats
13th	1931	Joe Lyons (1879–1939)	**United Australia**, forms a minority government under Joe Lyons.	14	**34**	16	4	1	6	Emergency Committee	75
Election Year		Prime Minister	Summary	Labor	United Australia Party	Country	Lang Labor	Independent	Other parties		Total seats
14th	1934	Joe Lyons (1879–1939)	The **Coalition** of the **UAP** and the **Country Party** forms a government under Joe Lyons.	18	**28**	**14**	9		5	LCL	74
Election Year		Prime Minister	Summary	Labor	United Australia Party	Country	Lang Labor	Independent	Other parties		Total seats
15th	1937	Joe Lyons (1879–1939) Sir Earle Page (1880–1961) Robert Menzies (1894–1978)	The **Coalition** forms another government under Joe Lyons.	29	**28**	**16**		1			74
Election Year		Prime Minister	Summary	Labor	United Australia Party	Country	Lang Labor	Independent	Other parties		Total seats
16th	1940	Robert Menzies (1894–1978) Arthur Fadden (1895–1973) John Curtin (1885–1945)	The **Coalition** forms a minority government under Robert Menzies. Billy Hughes later replaces him as **UAP** leader, and **Country Party** leader Arthur Fadden replaces him as **Coalition** leader and Prime Minister. Fadden serves for only 40 days, until Labor and the independents defeat his budget. **Labor** forms Government under John Curtin.	32	**23**	**14**	4	1			74
Election Year		Prime Minister	Summary	Labor	United Australia Party	Country	Lang Labor	Independent	Other parties		Total seats
17th	1943	John Curtin (1885–1945) Frank Forde (1890–1983) Ben Chifley (1885–1951)	**Labor** forms a government under John Curtin.	**49**	12	8		2	3	Country-National, Liberal Country, Country (QLD)	74
Election Year		Prime Minister	Summary	Labor	Liberal	Country	Lang Labor	Independent	Other parties		Total seats
18th	1946	Ben Chifley (1885–1951)	**Labor** forms a government under Ben Chifley.	**43**	15	11	1	1	3	LCL (2), Liberal Country	74
Election Year		Prime Minister	Summary	Labor	Liberal	Country	-	Independent	Other parties		Total seats
19th	1949	Robert Menzies (1894–1978)	The **Coalition** forms a government under Robert Menzies, but lacks a Senate majority. Menzies uses the Senate's rejection of the Commonwealth Bank Bill 1951 as a trigger for a double dissolution election.	47	**55**	**19**					121
Election Year		Prime Minister	Summary	Labor	Liberal	Country	-	Independent	Other parties		Total seats
20th	1951	Robert Menzies (1894–1978)	The **Coalition** forms another government under Robert Menzies and gains control of the Senate after a double dissolution.	52	**52**	**17**					121
Election Year		Prime Minister	Summary	Labor	Liberal	Country	-	Independent	Other parties		Total seats
21st	1954	Robert Menzies (1894–1978)	The **Coalition** forms another government under Robert Menzies.	57	**47**	**17**					121
Election Year		Prime Minister	Summary	Labor	Liberal	Country	-	Independent	Other parties		Total seats
22nd	1955	Robert Menzies (1894–1978)	The **Coalition** forms another government under Robert Menzies.	47	**57**	**18**					122
Election Year		Prime Minister	Summary	Labor	Liberal	Country	-	Independent	Other parties		Total seats
23rd	1958	Robert Menzies (1894–1978)	The **Coalition** forms another government under Robert Menzies.	45	**58**	**19**					122
Election Year		Prime Minister	Summary	Labor	Liberal	Country	-	Independent	Other parties		Total seats
24th	1961	Robert Menzies (1894–1978)	The **Coalition** forms another government under Robert Menzies.	60	**45**	**17**					122
Election Year		Prime Minister	Summary	Labor	Liberal	Country	-	Independent	Other parties		Total seats
25th	1963	Sir Robert Menzies (1894–1978) Harold Holt (1908–1967)	The **Coalition** forms another government under Sir Robert Menzies.	50	**52**	**20**					122
Election Year		Prime Minister	Summary	Labor	Liberal	Country	-	Independent	Other parties		Total seats
26th	1966	Harold Holt (1908–1967) John McEwen (1900–1980) John Gorton (1911–2002)	The **Coalition** forms a government under Harold Holt.	41	**61**	**21**		1			124
Election Year		Prime Minister	Summary	Labor	Liberal	Country	-	Independent	Other parties		Total seats
27th	1969	John Gorton (1911–2002) William McMahon (1908–1988)	The **Coalition** forms a government under John Gorton.	59	**46**	**20**					125
Election Year		Prime Minister	Summary	Labor	Liberal	Country	-	Independent	Other parties		Total seats
28th	1972	Gough Whitlam (1916–2014)	**Labor** forms its first government since 1949 under Gough Whitlam.	**67**	38	20					125
Election Year		Prime Minister	Summary	Labor	Liberal	Country	-	Independent	Other parties		Total seats
29th	1974	Gough Whitlam (1916–2014)	**Labor** forms another government under Gough Whitlam after a double dissolution triggered by a hostile Senate and resulting in the 1974 Joint Sitting.	**66**	40	21					127
Election Year		Prime Minister	Summary	Labor	Liberal	National Country Party	-	Independent	Other parties		Total seats
30th	1975	Malcolm Fraser (1930–2015)	The **Coalition** forms a government under Malcolm Fraser.	36	**68**	**23**					127
Election Year		Prime Minister	Summary	Labor	Liberal	National Country Party	-	Independent	Other parties		Total seats
31st	1977	Malcolm Fraser (1930–2015)	The **Coalition** forms another government under Malcolm Fraser.	38	**67**	**19**					124
Election Year		Prime Minister	Summary	Labor	Liberal	National Country Party	-	Independent	Other parties		Total seats
32nd	1980	Malcolm Fraser (1930–2015)	The **Coalition** forms another government under Malcolm Fraser.	51	**54**	**20**					125
Election Year		Prime Minister	Summary	Labor	Liberal	Nationals	-	Independent	Other parties		Total seats
33rd	1983	Bob Hawke (1929-2019)	**Labor** forms a government under Bob Hawke after a double dissolution.	**75**	33	17					125
Election Year		Prime Minister	Summary	Labor	Liberal	Nationals	-	Independent	Other parties		Total seats
34th	1984	Bob Hawke (1929-2019)	**Labor** forms another government under Bob Hawke.	**82**	45	21					148
Election Year		Prime Minister	Summary	Labor	Liberal	Nationals	-	Independent	Other parties		Total seats
35th	1987	Bob Hawke (1929-2019)	**Labor** forms another government under Bob Hawke after a double dissolution over the Australia Card.	**86**	43	19					148
Election Year		Prime Minister	Summary	Labor	Liberal	Nationals	-	Independent	Other parties		Total seats
36th	1990	Bob Hawke (1929-2019) Paul Keating (1944– )	**Labor** forms another government under Bob Hawke.	**78**	55	14		1			148
Election Year		Prime Minister	Summary	Labor	Liberal	Nationals	-	Independent	Other parties		Total seats
37th	1993	Paul Keating (1944– )	**Labor** forms a government under Paul Keating.	**80**	49	16		2			147
Election Year		Prime Minister	Summary	Labor	Liberal	Nationals	-	Independent	Other parties		Total seats
38th	1996	John Howard (1939– )	The **Coalition** forms a government under John Howard.	49	**75**	**19**		5			148
Election Year		Prime Minister	Summary	Labor	Liberal	Nationals	-	Independent	Other parties		Total seats
39th	1998	John Howard (1939– )	The **Coalition** forms another government under John Howard.	67	**64**	**16**		1			148
Election Year		Prime Minister	Summary	Labor	Liberal	Nationals	-	Independent	Other parties		Total seats
40th	2001	John Howard (1939– )	The **Coalition** forms another government under John Howard.	65	**69**	**13**		3			150
Election Year		Prime Minister	Summary	Labor	Liberal	Nationals	-	Independent	Other parties		Total seats
41st	2004	John Howard (1939– )	The **Coalition** forms another government under John Howard.	60	**75**	**12**		3			150
Election Year		Prime Minister	Summary	Labor	Liberal	Nationals	-	Independent	Other parties		Total seats
42nd	2007	Kevin Rudd (1957– ) Julia Gillard (1961– )	**Labor** forms a government under Kevin Rudd.	**83**	55	10		2			150
Election Year		Prime Minister	Summary	Labor	Liberal	Nationals	Greens	Independent	Other parties		Total seats
43rd	2010	Julia Gillard (1961– ) Kevin Rudd (1957– )	**Labor** forms a minority government with the support of 3 independents and 1 Green under Julia Gillard.	**72**	44 (+ 16 LNP and 1 CLP)	6 + (5 LNP)	1	4	1	WA Nationals	150
Election Year		Prime Minister	Summary	Labor	Liberal	Nationals	Greens	Independent	Other parties		Total seats
44th	2013	Tony Abbott (1957– ) Malcolm Turnbull (1954– )	The **Coalition** forms a government under Tony Abbott.	55	**58 (+ 16 LNP and 1 CLP)**	**9 (+6 LNP)**	1	2	2	(1) Katter's Australian Party (1) Palmer United	150
Election Year		Prime Minister	Summary	Labor	Liberal	Nationals	Greens	Independent	Other parties		Total seats
45th	2016	Malcolm Turnbull (1954– ) Scott Morrison (1968– )	The **Coalition** forms another government under Malcolm Turnbull.	69	**45 (+ 15 LNP)**	**10 (+ 6 LNP)**	1	2	2	(1) Katter's Australian Party (1) Nick Xenophon Team	150
Election Year		Prime Minister	Summary	Labor	Liberal	Nationals	Greens	Independent	Other parties		Total seats
46th	2019	Scott Morrison (1968–)	The **Coalition** forms another government under Scott Morrison.	68	**44 (+ 17 LNP)**	**10 (+ 6 LNP)**	1	3	2	(1) Katter's Australian Party (1) Centre Alliance	151
Election Year		Prime Minister	Summary	Labor	Liberal	Nationals	Greens	Independent	Other parties		Total seats
47th	2022	Anthony Albanese (1963–)	**Labor** forms a government under Anthony Albanese.	**77**	27 (+ 15 LNP)	10 (+ 6 LNP)	4	10	2	(1) Katter's Australian Party (1) Centre Alliance	151
Election Year		Prime Minister	Summary	Labor	Liberal	Nationals	Greens	Independent	Other parties		Total seats
48th	2025	Anthony Albanese (1963–)	**Labor** forms another government under Anthony Albanese.	**94**	18 (+ 10 LNP)	9 (+ 6 LNP)	1	9	2	(1) Katter's Australian Party (1) Centre Alliance	150

=== House of Representatives primary, two-party and seat results ===
A two-party system has existed in the Australian House of Representatives since the two non-Labor parties merged in 1909. The 1910 election was the first to elect a majority government, with the Australian Labor Party concurrently winning the first Senate majority. Prior to 1909 a three-party system existed in the chamber. A two-party-preferred vote (2PP) has been calculated since the 1919 change from first-past-the-post to preferential voting and subsequent introduction of the Coalition. ALP = Australian Labor Party, L+NP = grouping of Liberal/National/LNP/CLP Coalition parties (and predecessors), Oth = other parties and independents.

1901-1906 House of Representatives results
Election Year		Labor	Free Trade	Protectionist	Independent	Other Parties		Total seats
Election Year		Labor	Free Trade	Protectionist	Independent	Name	Seats	Total seats
1st	1901	16	25	**32**	2	—N/a	—N/a	75
2nd	1903	22	24	**26**	2	Revenue Tariff	1	75
Election Year		Labor	Anti-Socialist	Protectionist	Independent	Other Parties		Total seats
Election Year		Labor	Anti-Socialist	Protectionist	Independent	Name	Seats	Total seats
3rd	1906	26	26	**16**	5	Western Australian	2	75

1910-present House of Representatives results
Election Date	Primary vote			2PP vote		Seats			
Election Date	ALP	L/NP	Oth.	ALP	L/NP	ALP	L/NP	Oth.	Total
13 April 1910 election	**50.0%**	45.1%	4.9%	—N/a	—N/a	**42**	31	2	75
31 May 1913 election	48.5%	**48.9%**	2.6%	—N/a	—N/a	37	**38**	—N/a	75
5 September 1914 election	**50.9%**	47.2%	1.9%	—N/a	—N/a	**42**	32	1	75
5 May 1917 election	43.9%	**54.2%**	1.9%	—N/a	—N/a	22	**53**	—N/a	75
13 December 1919 election	42.5%	**54.3%**	3.2%	45.9%	**54.1%**	26	**48**	1	75
16 December 1922 election	42.3%	**47.8%**	9.9%	48.8%	**51.2%**	29	**40**	6	75
14 November 1925 election	45.0%	**53.2%**	1.8%	46.2%	**53.8%**	23	**50**	2	75
17 November 1928 election	44.6%	**49.6%**	5.8%	48.4%	**51.6%**	31	**42**	2	75
12 October 1929 election	**48.8%**	44.2%	7.0%	**56.7%**	43.3%	**46**	24	5	75
19 December 1931 election	27.1%	**48.4%**	24.5%	41.5%	**58.5%**	14	**50**	11	75
15 September 1934 election	26.8%	**45.6%**	27.6%	46.5%	**53.5%**	18	**42**	14	74
23 October 1937 election	43.2%	**49.3%**	7.5%	49.4%	**50.6%**	29	**43**	2	74
21 September 1940 election	40.2%	**43.9%**	15.9%	**50.3%**	49.7%	32	**36**	6	74
21 August 1943 election	**49.9%**	31.3%	18.6%	**58.2%**	41.8%	**49**	23	2	74
28 September 1946 election	**49.7%**	39.3%	11.0%	**54.1%**	45.9%	**43**	26	5	74
10 December 1949 election	46.0%	**50.3%**	3.7%	49.0%	**51.0%**	47	**74**	—N/a	121
28 April 1951 election	47.6%	**50.3%**	2.1%	49.3%	**50.7%**	52	**69**	—N/a	121
29 May 1954 election	**50.0%**	46.8%	3.2%	**50.7%**	49.3%	57	**64**	—N/a	121
10 December 1955 election	44.6%	**47.6%**	7.8%	45.8%	**54.2%**	47	**75**	—N/a	122
22 November 1958 election	42.8%	**46.6%**	10.6%	45.9%	**54.1%**	45	**77**	—N/a	122
9 December 1961 election	**47.9%**	42.1%	10.0%	**50.5%**	49.5%	60	**62**	—N/a	122
30 November 1963 election	45.5%	**46.0%**	8.5%	47.4%	**52.6%**	50	**72**	—N/a	122
26 November 1966 election	40.0%	**50.0%**	10.0%	43.1%	**56.9%**	41	**82**	1	124
25 October 1969 election	**47.0%**	43.3%	9.7%	**50.2%**	49.8%	59	**66**	—N/a	125
2 December 1972 election	**49.6%**	41.5%	8.9%	**52.7%**	47.3%	**67**	58	—N/a	125
18 May 1974 election	**49.3%**	44.9%	5.8%	**51.7%**	48.3%	**66**	61	—N/a	127
13 December 1975 election	42.8%	**53.1%**	4.1%	44.3%	**55.7%**	36	**91**	—N/a	127
10 December 1977 election	39.7%	**48.1%**	12.2%	45.4%	**54.6%**	38	**86**	—N/a	124
18 October 1980 election	45.2%	**46.3%**	8.5%	49.6%	**50.4%**	51	**74**	—N/a	125
5 March 1983 election	**49.5%**	43.6%	6.9%	**53.2%**	46.8%	**75**	50	—N/a	125
1 December 1984 election	**47.6%**	45.0%	7.4%	**51.8%**	48.2%	**82**	66	—N/a	148
11 July 1987 election	45.8%	**46.1%**	8.1%	**50.8%**	49.2%	**86**	62	—N/a	148
24 March 1990 election	39.4%	**43.5%**	17.1%	49.9%	**50.1%**	**78**	69	1	148
13 March 1993 election	**44.9%**	44.3%	10.7%	**51.4%**	48.6%	**80**	65	2	147
2 March 1996 election	38.7%	**47.3%**	14.0%	46.4%	**53.6%**	49	**94**	5	148
3 October 1998 election	**40.1%**	39.5%	20.4%	**51.0%**	49.0%	67	**80**	1	148
10 November 2001 election	37.8%	**43.0%**	19.2%	49.0%	**51.0%**	65	**82**	3	150
9 October 2004 election	37.6%	**46.7%**	15.7%	47.3%	**52.7%**	60	**87**	3	150
24 November 2007 election	**43.4%**	42.1%	14.5%	**52.7%**	47.3%	**83**	65	2	150
21 August 2010 election	38.0%	**43.3%**	18.7%	**50.1%**	49.9%	**72**	72	6	150
7 September 2013 election	33.4%	**45.6%**	21.0%	46.5%	**53.5%**	55	**90**	5	150
2 July 2016 election	34.7%	**42.0%**	23.3%	49.6%	**50.4%**	69	**76**	5	150
18 May 2019 election	33.3%	**41.4%**	25.3%	48.5%	**51.5%**	68	**77**	6	151
21 May 2022 election	32.6%	**35.7%**	31.7%	**52.1%**	47.9%	**77**	58	16	151
3 May 2025 election	**34.6%**	31.8%	33.6%	**55.3%**	44.7%	**94**	43	13	150

== Historical party composition of the Senate ==
The Senate has included representatives from a range of political parties, including several parties that have seldom or never had representation in the House of Representatives, but which have consistently secured a small but significant level of electoral support, as the table shows.

Results represent the composition of the Senate after the elections. The full Senate has been contested on eight occasions; the inaugural election and seven double dissolutions. These are highlighted in puce.

Election Year		ALP Labor	LIB Liberal (Note: Includes results for the Free Trade Party for 1901 and 1903, the Anti-Socialist Party for 1906, the Commonwealth Liberal Party for 1910—1914, the Nationalist Party for 1917—1929, and the United Australia Party for 1931—1943.)		NAT National (Note: Includes results for the Country Party for 1919—1974 and the National Country Party for 1975—1980.)	DLP Labor DLP	DEM Democrats	GRN Greens	CLP CLP	IND Independent	Other parties		Total seats	Electoral system
Election Year		ALP Labor	LIB Liberal		NAT National	DLP Labor DLP	DEM Democrats	GRN Greens	CLP CLP	IND Independent	Name	Seats	Total seats	Electoral system
1st	1901	8	11 (Note: Protectionist Party)	17	—N/a	—N/a	—N/a	—N/a	—N/a	—N/a	—N/a	—N/a	36	(Note: Plurality-at-large voting)
2nd	1903	8	12	14	—N/a	—N/a	—N/a	—N/a	—N/a	1	Revenue Tariff	1	36	
3rd	1906	15	6	13	—N/a	—N/a	—N/a	—N/a	—N/a	2	—N/a	—N/a	36	
4th	1910	22	14		—N/a	—N/a	—N/a	—N/a	—N/a	—N/a	—N/a	—N/a	36	
5th	1913	29	7		—N/a	—N/a	—N/a	—N/a	—N/a	—N/a	—N/a	—N/a	36	
6th	1914	31	5		—N/a	—N/a	—N/a	—N/a	—N/a	—N/a	—N/a	—N/a	36	
7th	1917	12	24		—N/a	—N/a	—N/a	—N/a	—N/a	—N/a	—N/a	—N/a	36	
8th	1919	1	35		—N/a	—N/a	—N/a	—N/a	—N/a	—N/a	—N/a	—N/a	36	(Note: Preferential block voting)
9th	1922	12	24		—N/a	—N/a	—N/a	—N/a	—N/a	—N/a	—N/a	—N/a	36	
10th	1925	8	25		3	—N/a	—N/a	—N/a	—N/a	—N/a	—N/a	—N/a	36	
11th	1928	7	24		5	—N/a	—N/a	—N/a	—N/a	—N/a	—N/a	—N/a	36	
12th	1931	10	21		5	—N/a	—N/a	—N/a	—N/a	—N/a	—N/a	—N/a	36	
13th	1934	3	26		7	—N/a	—N/a	—N/a	—N/a	—N/a	—N/a	—N/a	36	
14th	1937	16	16		4	—N/a	—N/a	—N/a	—N/a	—N/a	—N/a	—N/a	36	
15th	1940	17	15		4	—N/a	—N/a	—N/a	—N/a	—N/a	—N/a	—N/a	36	
16th	1943	22	12		2	—N/a	—N/a	—N/a	—N/a	—N/a	—N/a	—N/a	36	
17th	1946	33	2		1	—N/a	—N/a	—N/a	—N/a	—N/a	—N/a	—N/a	36	
18th	1949	34	21		5	—N/a	—N/a	—N/a	—N/a	—N/a	—N/a	—N/a	60	
19th	1951	28	26		6	—N/a	—N/a	—N/a	—N/a	—N/a	—N/a	—N/a	60	(Note: Single transferable vote)
20th	1953	29	26		5	—N/a	—N/a	—N/a	—N/a	—N/a	—N/a	—N/a	60	
21st	1955	28	24		6	2	—N/a	—N/a	—N/a	—N/a	—N/a	—N/a	60	
22nd	1958	26	25		7	2	—N/a	—N/a	—N/a	—N/a	—N/a	—N/a	60	
23rd	1961	28	24		6	1	—N/a	—N/a	—N/a	1	—N/a	—N/a	60	
24th	1964	27	23		7	2	—N/a	—N/a	—N/a	1	—N/a	—N/a	60	
25th	1967	27	21		7	4	—N/a	—N/a	—N/a	1	—N/a	—N/a	60	
26th	1970	26	21		5	5	—N/a	—N/a	—N/a	3	—N/a	—N/a	60	
27th	1974	29	23		6	—N/a	—N/a	—N/a	—N/a	1	Liberal Movement	1	60	
28th	1975	27	26		8	—N/a	—N/a	—N/a	1	1	Liberal Movement	1	64	
29th	1977	27	27		6	—N/a	2	—N/a	1	1	—N/a	—N/a	64	
30th	1980	27	27		3	—N/a	5	—N/a	1	1	—N/a	—N/a	64	
31st	1983	30	23		4	—N/a	5	—N/a	1	1	—N/a	—N/a	64	
32nd	1984	34	27		5	—N/a	7	—N/a	1	1	Nuclear Disarmament	1	76	(Note: Preferential block voting (Group voting ticket))
33rd	1987	32	26		7	—N/a	7	—N/a	1	2	Nuclear Disarmament	1	76	
34th	1990	32	28		5	—N/a	8	—N/a	1	1	Greens (WA)	1	76	
35th	1993	30	29		6	—N/a	7	—N/a	1	1	Greens (WA)	2	76	
36th	1996	29	31		5	—N/a	7	—N/a	1	1	Greens (WA)	1	76	
36th	1996	29	31		5	—N/a	7	—N/a	1	1	Greens (Tas)	1	76	
36th	1996	29	31		5	—N/a	7	—N/a	1	1	Total	2	76	
37th	1998	29	31		3	—N/a	9	1	1	1	One Nation	1	76	
38th	2001	28	31		3	—N/a	8	2	1	2	One Nation	1	76	
39th	2004	28	33		5	—N/a	4	4	1	—N/a	Family First	1	76	
40th	2007	32	32		4	—N/a	—N/a	5	1	1	Family First	1	76	
41st	2010	31	28 (+3 LNP)		2	1	—N/a	9	1	1	—N/a	—N/a	76	
42nd	2013	25	23 (+5 LNP)		3 (+1 LNP)	1	—N/a	10	1	1	Family First	1	76	
42nd	2013	25	23 (+5 LNP)		3 (+1 LNP)	1	—N/a	10	1	1	Liberal Democrats	1	76	
42nd	2013	25	23 (+5 LNP)		3 (+1 LNP)	1	—N/a	10	1	1	Motoring Enthusiast	1	76	
42nd	2013	25	23 (+5 LNP)		3 (+1 LNP)	1	—N/a	10	1	1	Palmer United	3	76	
42nd	2013	25	23 (+5 LNP)		3 (+1 LNP)	1	—N/a	10	1	1	Total	6	76	
43rd	2016	26	21 (+3 LNP)		3 (+2 LNP)	—N/a	—N/a	9	1	—N/a	Family First	1	76	(Note: Single transferable vote (Optional preferential voting))
43rd	2016	26	21 (+3 LNP)		3 (+2 LNP)	—N/a	—N/a	9	1	—N/a	Liberal Democrats	1	76	(Note: Single transferable vote (Optional preferential voting))
43rd	2016	26	21 (+3 LNP)		3 (+2 LNP)	—N/a	—N/a	9	1	—N/a	Jacqui Lambie	1	76	(Note: Single transferable vote (Optional preferential voting))
43rd	2016	26	21 (+3 LNP)		3 (+2 LNP)	—N/a	—N/a	9	1	—N/a	Justice Party	1	76	(Note: Single transferable vote (Optional preferential voting))
43rd	2016	26	21 (+3 LNP)		3 (+2 LNP)	—N/a	—N/a	9	1	—N/a	Nick Xenophon Team	3	76	(Note: Single transferable vote (Optional preferential voting))
43rd	2016	26	21 (+3 LNP)		3 (+2 LNP)	—N/a	—N/a	9	1	—N/a	One Nation	4	76	(Note: Single transferable vote (Optional preferential voting))
43rd	2016	26	21 (+3 LNP)		3 (+2 LNP)	—N/a	—N/a	9	1	—N/a	Total	11	76	(Note: Single transferable vote (Optional preferential voting))
44th	2019	26	26 (+4 LNP)		2 (+2 LNP)	—N/a	—N/a	9	1	1	Jacqui Lambie	1	76	
44th	2019	26	26 (+4 LNP)		2 (+2 LNP)	—N/a	—N/a	9	1	1	Centre Alliance	2	76	
44th	2019	26	26 (+4 LNP)		2 (+2 LNP)	—N/a	—N/a	9	1	1	One Nation	2	76	
44th	2019	26	26 (+4 LNP)		2 (+2 LNP)	—N/a	—N/a	9	1	1	Total	5	76	
45th	2022	26	23 (+5 LNP)		3	—N/a	—N/a	12	1	1	United Australia	1	76	(Note: Single transferable vote (Proportional representation))
45th	2022	26	23 (+5 LNP)		3	—N/a	—N/a	12	1	1	Jacqui Lambie	2	76	(Note: Single transferable vote (Proportional representation))
45th	2022	26	23 (+5 LNP)		3	—N/a	—N/a	12	1	1	One Nation	2	76	(Note: Single transferable vote (Proportional representation))
45th	2022	26	23 (+5 LNP)		3	—N/a	—N/a	12	1	1	Total	5	76	(Note: Single transferable vote (Proportional representation))
46th	2025	28	26		9	—N/a	—N/a	11	1	4	Jacqui Lambie	1	76	
46th	2025	28	26		9	—N/a	—N/a	11	1	4	United Australia	1	76	
46th	2025	28	26		9	—N/a	—N/a	11	1	4	Australia's Voice	1	76	
46th	2025	28	26		9	—N/a	—N/a	11	1	4	People First	1	76	
46th	2025	28	26		9	—N/a	—N/a	11	1	4	One Nation	2	76	
46th	2025	28	26		9	—N/a	—N/a	11	1	4	Total	6	76	

== See also ==
- Chronology of Australian federal parliaments
- Timeline of Australian elections
- Elections in Australia
- List of political parties in Australia
- List of Australian federal by-elections
- 2013 Australian federal election
