= 1943 Australian House of Representatives election =

This is a list of electoral division results for the Australian 1943 federal election.

Australian federal election, 21 August 1943 House of Representatives << 1940–1946 >>
| Enrolled voters | 4,466,749 | | | | |
| Votes cast | 4,249,369 | | Turnout | 95.13 | +1.27 |
| Informal votes | 148,785 | | Informal | 3.50 | +0.95 |
Summary of votes by party
| Party | Primary votes | % | Swing | Seats | Change |
| Labor | 2,058,582 | 50.20% | +10.04% | 49 | + 17 |
| United Australia | 898,128 | 21.90% | –8.34% | 14 | – 9 |
| Country | 350,378 | 8.54% | –4.97% | 9 | – 4 |
| One Parliament | 87,112 | 2.11% | +2.11% | 0 | ± 0 |
| Communist | 81,816 | 1.98% | +1.98% | 0 | ± 0 |
| Liberal Democratic | 42,149 | 1.02% | +1.02% | 0 | ± 0 |
| State Labor | 29,752 | 0.72% | –1.89% | 0 | ± 0 |
| Independent | 501,054 | 12.15% | +4.69% | 2 | ± 0 |
| Total | 4,100,584 | | | 74 | |

== New South Wales ==
1943 Australian federal election (New South Wales)
| ← 1940 | 21 August 1943 | 1946 → |

All 28 NSW seats in the House of Representatives 14 seats needed for a majority
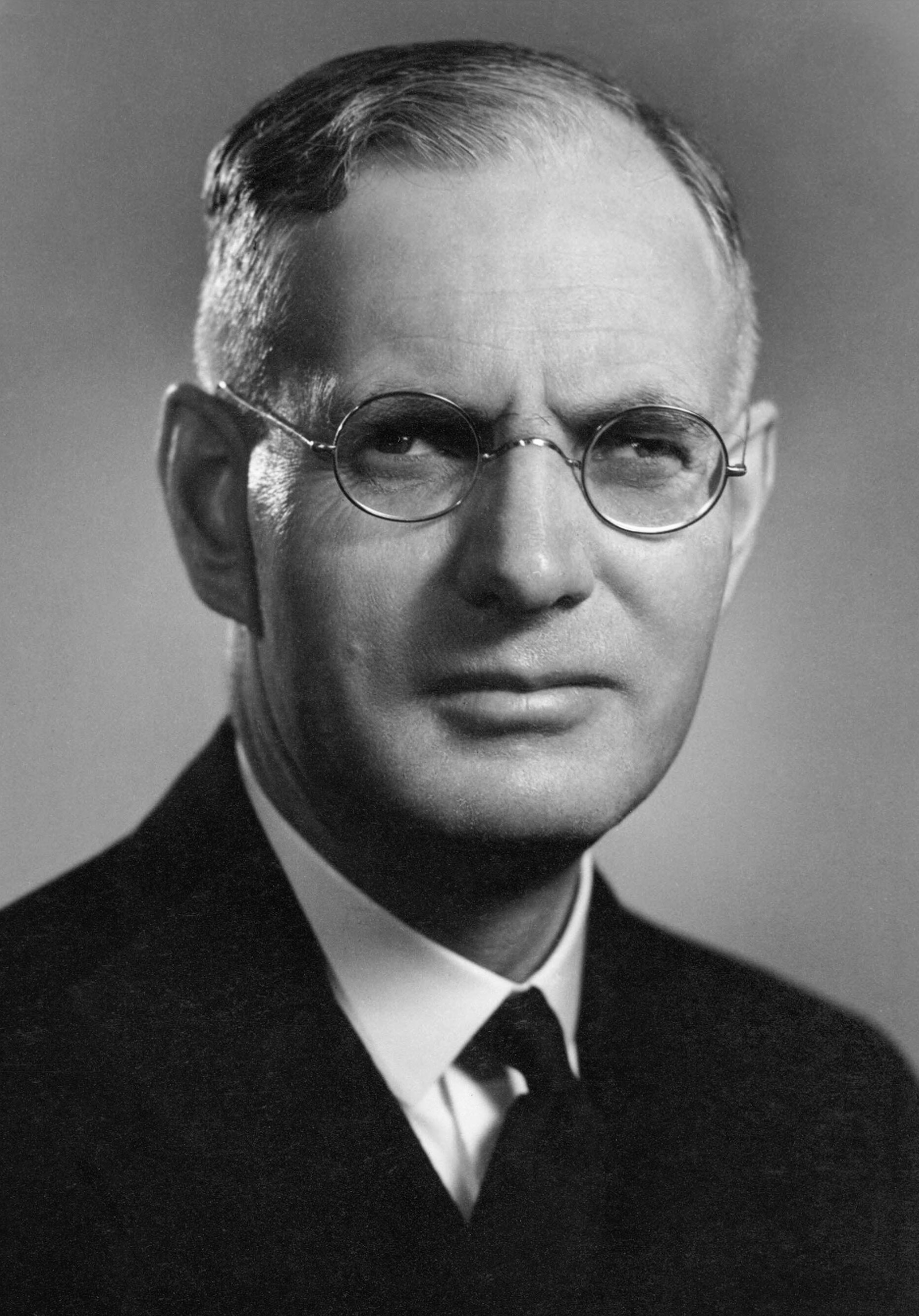

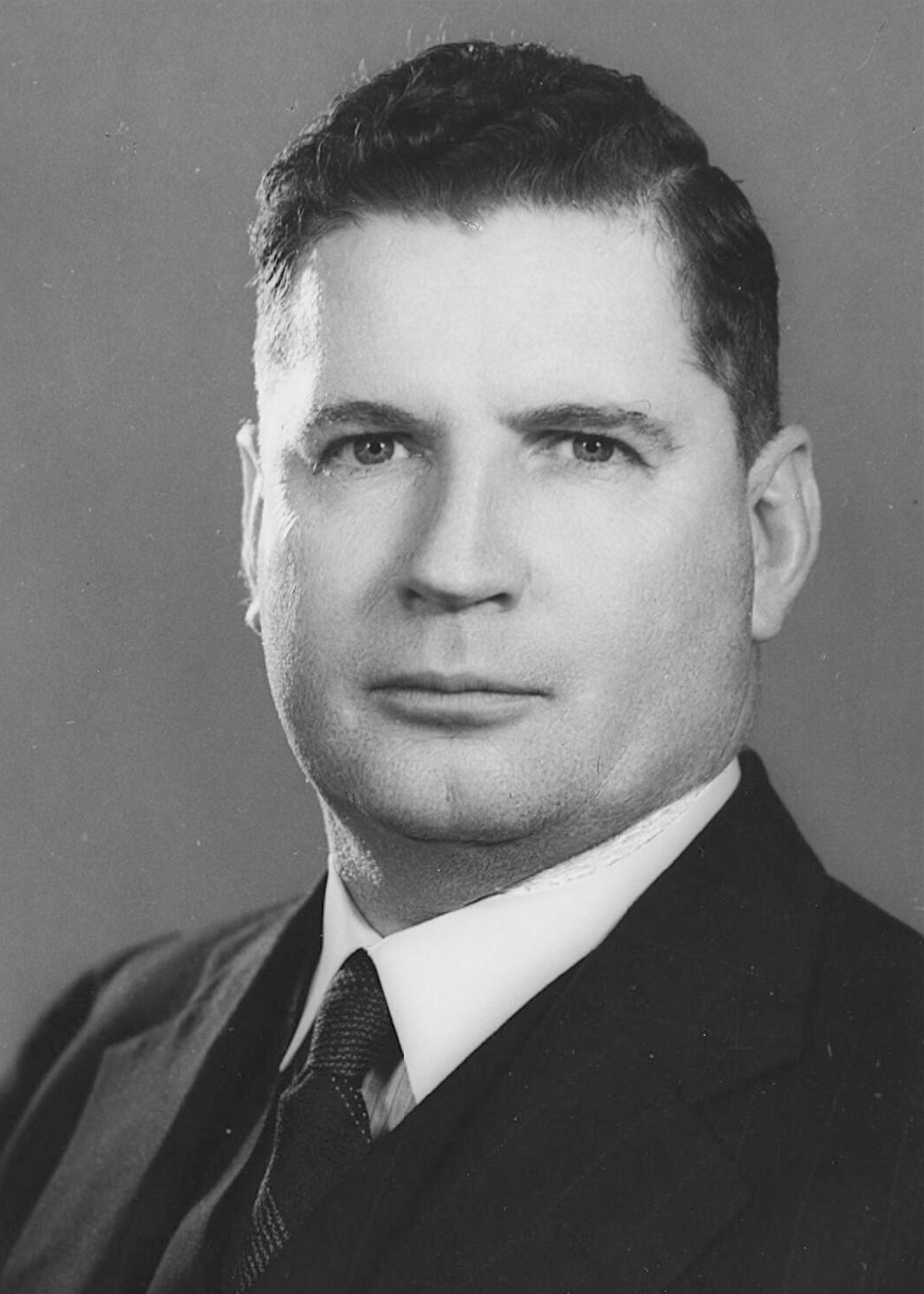
| | First party | Second party |
|---|---|---|
| Leader | John Curtin | Arthur Fadden |
| Party | Labor | Coalition |
| Seats before | 12 | 12 |
| Seats won | 21 | 7 |
| Seat change | ▲9 | ▼5 |
| Popular vote | 834,855 | 404,101 |
| Percentage | 53.8% | 25.6% |
| Swing | ▲18.5pp | ▼13.3pp |

=== Barton ===
1943 Australian federal election: Barton
| Party | Candidate | Votes | % | ±% |
|---|---|---|---|---|
| Labor | H. V. Evatt | 51,296 | 74.2 | +16.8 |
| United Australia | Frank Browne | 15,897 | 23.0 | −12.4 |
| Protestant People | Thomas Claydon | 1,936 | 2.8 | +2.8 |
| Total formal votes | | 69,129 | 98.3 | |
| Informal votes | | 1,179 | 1.7 | |
| Turnout | | 70,308 | 99.3 | |
Two-party-preferred result
| Labor | H. V. Evatt | | 75.6 | +13.5 |
| United Australia | Frank Browne | | 24.4 | −13.5 |
| Labor hold | | Swing | +13.5 | |

=== Calare ===
1943 Australian federal election: Calare
| Party | Candidate | Votes | % | ±% |
|---|---|---|---|---|
| Labor | John Breen | 27,071 | 54.4 | +27.8 |
| Country | Albert Reid | 10,275 | 20.6 | −14.0 |
| Independent | Harold Thorby | 6,270 | 12.6 | +12.6 |
| Country | Reg Edols | 5,142 | 10.3 | +10.3 |
| One Parliament | Percy Phelan | 1,029 | 2.1 | +2.1 |
| Total formal votes | | 49,787 | 97.9 | |
| Informal votes | | 1,061 | 2.1 | |
| Turnout | | 50,848 | 97.3 | |
Two-party-preferred result
| Labor | John Breen | | 59.9 | +6.5 |
| Country | Albert Reid | | 40.1 | −6.5 |
| Labor hold | | Swing | +6.5 | |

=== Cook ===
1943 Australian federal election: Cook
| Party | Candidate | Votes | % | ±% |
|---|---|---|---|---|
| Labor | Tom Sheehan | 39,653 | 68.9 | +36.3 |
| State Labor | Sid Conway | 12,131 | 21.1 | +21.1 |
| One Parliament | Albert Jones | 3,238 | 5.6 | +5.6 |
| Protestant Labour | Cyril Glassop | 2,557 | 4.4 | +4.4 |
| Total formal votes | | 57,579 | 96.7 | |
| Informal votes | | 1,986 | 3.3 | |
| Turnout | | 59,565 | 98.0 | |
Two-party-preferred result
| Labor | Tom Sheehan | | 76.4 | +40.0 |
| State Labor | Sid Conway | | 23.6 | +23.6 |
| Labor gain from Labor (N-C) | | Swing | +40.0 | |

=== Cowper ===
1943 Australian federal election: Cowper
| Party | Candidate | Votes | % | ±% |
|---|---|---|---|---|
| Country | Sir Earle Page | 24,017 | 45.5 | −8.2 |
| Labor | John Howard | 21,375 | 40.5 | +18.6 |
| Independent | Joseph McElhone | 5,403 | 10.2 | −6.0 |
| One Parliament | Alexander Moore | 1,936 | 3.7 | +3.7 |
| Total formal votes | | 52,731 | 98.7 | |
| Informal votes | | 690 | 1.3 | |
| Turnout | | 53,421 | 97.0 | |
Two-party-preferred result
| Country | Sir Earle Page | 27,736 | 52.6 | −12.3 |
| Labor | John Howard | 24,995 | 47.4 | +12.3 |
| Country hold | | Swing | −12.3 | |

=== Dalley ===
1943 Australian federal election: Dalley
| Party | Candidate | Votes | % | ±% |
|---|---|---|---|---|
| Labor | Sol Rosevear | 44,127 | 74.8 | +41.3 |
| One Parliament | Ernest de Faria | 10,760 | 18.2 | +18.2 |
| Communist | Lance Sharkey | 4,087 | 6.9 | +6.9 |
| Total formal votes | | 58,974 | 96.9 | |
| Informal votes | | 1,864 | 3.1 | |
| Turnout | | 60,838 | 98.0 | |
Two-party-preferred result
| Labor | Sol Rosevear | | 81.1 | +38.3 |
| One Parliament | Ernest de Faria | | 18.9 | +18.9 |
| Labor gain from Labor (N-C) | | Swing | +38.3 | |

=== Darling ===
1943 Australian federal election: Darling
| Party | Candidate | Votes | % | ±% |
|---|---|---|---|---|
| Labor | Joe Clark | 32,540 | 71.6 | +8.2 |
| One Parliament | James Butler | 12,936 | 28.4 | +28.4 |
| Total formal votes | | 45,476 | 97.5 | |
| Informal votes | | 1,180 | 2.5 | |
| Turnout | | 46,656 | 90.9 | |
| Labor hold | | Swing | −1.9 | |

=== East Sydney ===
1943 Australian federal election: East Sydney
| Party | Candidate | Votes | % | ±% |
|---|---|---|---|---|
| Labor | Eddie Ward | 36,531 | 69.0 | +19.9 |
| United Australia | Vincent Brady | 12,430 | 23.5 | −7.0 |
| Liberal Democratic | Hugh Angrave | 2,377 | 4.5 | +4.5 |
| One Parliament | Ernest Carr | 1,141 | 2.2 | +2.2 |
| Independent | Arthur Shirley | 494 | 0.9 | +0.9 |
| Total formal votes | | 52,973 | 96.4 | |
| Informal votes | | 1,967 | 3.6 | |
| Turnout | | 54,940 | 94.8 | |
Two-party-preferred result
| Labor | Eddie Ward | | 71.0 | +4.9 |
| United Australia | Vincent Brady | | 29.0 | −4.9 |
| Labor hold | | Swing | +4.9 | |

=== Eden-Monaro ===
1943 Australian federal election: Eden-Monaro
| Party | Candidate | Votes | % | ±% |
|---|---|---|---|---|
| Labor | Allan Fraser | 23,662 | 48.9 | +14.4 |
| Liberal Democratic | Denzil Macarthur-Onslow | 10,510 | 21.7 | +21.7 |
| United Australia | John Perkins | 10,162 | 21.0 | −30.9 |
| Independent | Bill Beale | 3,210 | 6.6 | +1.3 |
| Independent | Jonas Crabtree | 365 | 0.8 | +0.8 |
| Independent | Cecil Gray | 262 | 0.5 | +0.5 |
| Independent | John Egan | 211 | 0.4 | +0.4 |
| Total formal votes | | 48,382 | 96.6 | |
| Informal votes | | 1,695 | 3.4 | |
| Turnout | | 50,077 | 97.1 | |
Two-party-preferred result
| Labor | Allan Fraser | | 55.4 | +10.2 |
| Liberal Democratic | Denzil Macarthur-Onslow | | 46.6 | +46.6 |
| Labor gain from United Australia | | Swing | +10.8 | |

=== Gwydir ===
1943 Australian federal election: Gwydir
| Party | Candidate | Votes | % | ±% |
|---|---|---|---|---|
| Labor | William Scully | 28,404 | 59.5 | +4.1 |
| Country | Colin Gale | 14,320 | 30.0 | −13.0 |
| Independent | Edmund Daniel | 3,985 | 8.3 | +8.3 |
| One Parliament | William Mills | 1,027 | 2.2 | +2.2 |
| Total formal votes | | 47,736 | 98.6 | |
| Informal votes | | 684 | 1.4 | |
| Turnout | | 48,420 | 95.0 | |
Two-party-preferred result
| Labor | William Scully | | 63.7 | +4.9 |
| Country | Colin Gale | | 36.3 | −4.9 |
| Labor hold | | Swing | +4.9 | |

=== Hume ===
1943 Australian federal election: Hume
| Party | Candidate | Votes | % | ±% |
|---|---|---|---|---|
| Labor | Arthur Fuller | 25,420 | 49.6 | +26.7 |
| Country | Thomas Collins | 19,629 | 38.3 | −3.9 |
| Independent | Vernon Lawrence | 4,667 | 9.1 | +9.1 |
| Communist | John McLeod | 1,143 | 2.2 | +2.2 |
| Liberal Democratic | John Neeld | 406 | 0.8 | +0.8 |
| Total formal votes | | 51,265 | 97.6 | |
| Informal votes | | 1,242 | 2.4 | |
| Turnout | | 52,507 | 96.0 | |
Two-party-preferred result
| Labor | Arthur Fuller | | 56.3 | +7.2 |
| Country | Thomas Collins | | 43.7 | −7.2 |
| Labor gain from Country | | Swing | +7.2 | |

=== Hunter ===
1943 Australian federal election: Hunter
| Party | Candidate | Votes | % | ±% |
|---|---|---|---|---|
| Labor | Rowley James | unopposed | | |
| Labor hold | | Swing | | |

=== Lang ===
1943 Australian federal election: Lang
| Party | Candidate | Votes | % | ±% |
|---|---|---|---|---|
| Labor | Dan Mulcahy | 41,701 | 61.5 | +41.2 |
| United Australia | William Harris | 16,649 | 24.6 | −11.0 |
| Communist | Adam Ogston | 4,312 | 6.4 | +6.4 |
| Independent | John Metcalfe | 3,899 | 5.7 | +5.7 |
| Independent | Henry Mulcahy | 1,249 | 1.8 | +1.8 |
| Total formal votes | | 67,810 | 97.3 | |
| Informal votes | | 1,881 | 2.7 | |
| Turnout | | 69,691 | 97.7 | |
Two-party-preferred result
| Labor | Dan Mulcahy | | 71.0 | +71.0 |
| United Australia | William Harris | | 29.0 | −5.0 |
| Labor gain from Labor (N-C) | | Swing | +5.0 | |

=== Macquarie ===
1943 Australian federal election: Macquarie
| Party | Candidate | Votes | % | ±% |
|---|---|---|---|---|
| Labor | Ben Chifley | 36,937 | 65.0 | +20.4 |
| United Australia | Arthur Hebblewhite | 15,693 | 27.6 | −12.7 |
| One Parliament | Albert Walker | 2,766 | 4.9 | +4.9 |
| Independent Country | Millie Sullivan | 1,471 | 2.6 | +2.6 |
| Total formal votes | | 56,837 | 98.1 | |
| Informal votes | | 1,120 | 1.9 | |
| Turnout | | 57,987 | 93.6 | |
Two-party-preferred result
| Labor | Ben Chifley | | 68.8 | +10.7 |
| United Australia | Arthur Hebblewhite | | 31.2 | −10.7 |
| Labor hold | | Swing | +10.7 | |

=== Martin ===
1943 Australian federal election: Martin
| Party | Candidate | Votes | % | ±% |
|---|---|---|---|---|
| Labor | Fred Daly | 27,999 | 46.9 | +11.9 |
| United Australia | William McCall | 19,886 | 33.3 | −16.8 |
| State Labor | Albert Sloss | 3,597 | 6.0 | −8.9 |
| Liberal Democratic | George Mills | 3,591 | 6.0 | +6.0 |
| Independent | John Lee | 1,690 | 2.8 | +2.8 |
| Independent | Eleanor Glencross | 833 | 1.4 | +1.4 |
| Independent | Gerrard Armstrong | 787 | 1.3 | +1.3 |
| Independent | Edward Beck | 564 | 0.9 | +0.9 |
| Independent Nationalist | William Milne | 507 | 0.8 | +0.8 |
| Independent | Isabella Stenning | 170 | 0.3 | +0.3 |
| Ind. United Australia | Rupert Nicholson | 86 | 0.1 | +0.1 |
| Total formal votes | | 59,710 | 93.4 | |
| Informal votes | | 4,228 | 6.6 | |
| Turnout | | 63,938 | 97.6 | |
Two-party-preferred result
| Labor | Fred Daly | | 55.7 | +8.3 |
| United Australia | William McCall | | 44.3 | −8.3 |
| Labor gain from United Australia | | Swing | +8.3 | |

=== New England ===
1943 Australian federal election: New England
| Party | Candidate | Votes | % | ±% |
|---|---|---|---|---|
| Labor | Herbert Oxford | 22,342 | 46.9 | +13.8 |
| Country | Joe Abbott | 21,636 | 45.4 | −21.5 |
| Independent | Charles Abbott | 2,507 | 5.3 | +5.3 |
| One Parliament | James Fowler | 680 | 1.4 | +1.4 |
| Independent | Albert Royal | 468 | 1.0 | +1.0 |
| Total formal votes | | 47,633 | 96.8 | |
| Informal votes | | 1,552 | 3.2 | |
| Turnout | | 49,185 | 95.5 | |
Two-party-preferred result
| Country | Joe Abbott | 24,337 | 51.1 | −9.5 |
| Labor | Herbert Oxford | 23,296 | 48.9 | +9.5 |
| Country hold | | Swing | −9.5 | |

=== Newcastle ===
1943 Australian federal election: Newcastle
| Party | Candidate | Votes | % | ±% |
|---|---|---|---|---|
| Labor | David Watkins | 44,379 | 69.2 | −5.2 |
| Communist | Stan Deacon | 7,271 | 11.3 | +11.3 |
| Independent | James Bayley | 5,616 | 8.8 | +8.8 |
| Independent Labor | Fred Wright | 4,753 | 7.4 | +7.4 |
| Independent Labor | John Cain | 2,067 | 3.2 | +3.2 |
| Total formal votes | | 64,086 | 96.3 | |
| Informal votes | | 2,448 | 3.7 | |
| Turnout | | 66,534 | 97.0 | |
Two-party-preferred result
| Labor | David Watkins | | incalculable | ? |
| Labor hold | | Swing | ? | |

=== North Sydney ===
1943 Australian federal election: North Sydney
| Party | Candidate | Votes | % | ±% |
|---|---|---|---|---|
| United Australia | Billy Hughes | 29,962 | 44.1 | −17.2 |
| Labor | Leo Haylen | 24,989 | 35.7 | +20.2 |
| Independent | Patrick Williams | 6,132 | 9.0 | +9.0 |
| Independent | Eric Bentley | 3,349 | 4.9 | +4.9 |
| Communist | Jack Miles | 2,821 | 4.2 | +4.2 |
| One Parliament | Jack Lewis | 938 | 1.4 | +1.4 |
| Independent | Oliver Partington | 455 | 0.7 | +0.7 |
| Total formal votes | | 67,946 | 95.3 | |
| Informal votes | | 3,323 | 4.7 | |
| Turnout | | 71,269 | 98.4 | |
Two-party-preferred result
| United Australia | Billy Hughes | 36,066 | 53.1 | −14.5 |
| Labor | Leo Haylen | 31,880 | 46.9 | +46.9 |
| United Australia hold | | Swing | −14.5 | |

=== Parkes ===
1943 Australian federal election: Parkes
| Party | Candidate | Votes | % | ±% |
|---|---|---|---|---|
| Labor | Les Haylen | 29,891 | 48.5 | +10.8 |
| United Australia | Sir Charles Marr | 17,141 | 27.8 | −22.7 |
| Liberal Democratic | Nigel Love | 12,020 | 19.5 | +19.5 |
| Australian Women's Party | Pauline Budge | 1,301 | 2.1 | +2.1 |
| One Parliament | Arthur Miles | 929 | 1.5 | +1.5 |
| Independent | Francis Wilson | 171 | 0.3 | +0.3 |
| Independent | Arthur Thompson | 155 | 0.3 | +0.3 |
| Total formal votes | | 61,608 | 96.7 | |
| Informal votes | | 2,074 | 3.3 | |
| Turnout | | 63,682 | 97.4 | |
Two-party-preferred result
| Labor | Les Haylen | | 52.9 | +10.3 |
| United Australia | Sir Charles Marr | | 47.1 | −10.3 |
| Labor gain from United Australia | | Swing | +10.3 | |

=== Parramatta ===
1943 Australian federal election: Parramatta
| Party | Candidate | Votes | % | ±% |
|---|---|---|---|---|
| United Australia | Sir Frederick Stewart | 25,267 | 38.3 | −26.8 |
| Labor | Arthur Treble | 24,680 | 37.4 | +19.9 |
| Liberal Democratic | Ormond Bissett | 8,884 | 13.5 | +13.5 |
| National Unity | Robert Firebrace | 5,806 | 8.8 | +8.8 |
| Independent | Dexter Moore | 1,069 | 1.6 | +1.6 |
| Ind. United Australia | Howard Miscamble | 336 | 0.5 | +0.5 |
| Total formal votes | | 66,042 | 96.9 | |
| Informal votes | | 2,110 | 3.1 | |
| Turnout | | 68,152 | 96.7 | |
Two-party-preferred result
| United Australia | Sir Frederick Stewart | 39,150 | 59.3 | −6.4 |
| Labor | Arthur Treble | 26,892 | 40.7 | +6.4 |
| United Australia hold | | Swing | −6.4 | |

=== Reid ===
1943 Australian federal election: Reid
| Party | Candidate | Votes | % | ±% |
|---|---|---|---|---|
| Lang Labor | Jack Lang | 26,532 | 41.4 | +41.4 |
| Labor | Charles Morgan | 22,313 | 34.8 | +4.8 |
| United Australia | David Knox | 6,996 | 10.9 | +10.9 |
| State Labor | Jack Hughes | 3,729 | 5.8 | −4.8 |
| Ind. United Australia | Dick George | 2,863 | 4.5 | +4.5 |
| One Parliament | Alfred Turner | 1,728 | 2.7 | +2.7 |
| Total formal votes | | 64,161 | 96.0 | |
| Informal votes | | 2,671 | 4.0 | |
| Turnout | | 66,832 | 97.4 | |
Two-party-preferred result
| Labor | Charles Morgan | 34,154 | 53.2 | +1.2 |
| Lang Labor | Jack Lang | 30,007 | 46.8 | −1.2 |
| Labor hold | | Swing | +1.2 | |

=== Richmond ===
1943 Australian federal election: Richmond
| Party | Candidate | Votes | % | ±% |
|---|---|---|---|---|
| Country | Larry Anthony | 25,929 | 48.2 | −16.7 |
| Labor | Arthur Dodd | 17,030 | 31.6 | +0.6 |
| One Parliament | Alfred Anderson | 10,888 | 20.2 | +20.2 |
| Total formal votes | | 53,847 | 98.7 | |
| Informal votes | | 712 | 1.3 | |
| Turnout | | 54,559 | 95.8 | |
Two-party-preferred result
| Country | Larry Anthony | 34,246 | 63.6 | −3.3 |
| Labor | Arthur Dodd | 19,601 | 36.4 | +3.3 |
| Country hold | | Swing | −3.3 | |

=== Riverina ===
1943 Australian federal election: Riverina
| Party | Candidate | Votes | % | ±% |
|---|---|---|---|---|
| Labor | Joe Langtry | 25,397 | 55.3 | +33.6 |
| Country | Lindsay McIvor | 9,427 | 20.5 | −9.4 |
| Country | Russell Scilley | 5,613 | 12.2 | +12.2 |
| Independent | Robert Ballantyne | 2,992 | 6.5 | +6.5 |
| Independent | Robert McKenzie | 1,860 | 4.1 | +4.1 |
| Liberal Democratic | George Simons | 489 | 1.1 | +1.1 |
| Independent | Frank Rieck | 131 | 0.3 | +0.3 |
| Total formal votes | | 45,909 | 94.9 | |
| Informal votes | | 2,464 | 5.1 | |
| Turnout | | 48,373 | 96.0 | |
Two-party-preferred result
| Labor | Joe Langtry | | 63.1 | +11.5 |
| Country | Lindsay McIvor | | 46.9 | −11.5 |
| Labor hold | | Swing | +11.5 | |

=== Robertson ===
1943 Australian federal election: Robertson
| Party | Candidate | Votes | % | ±% |
|---|---|---|---|---|
| Labor | Thomas Williams | 28,927 | 49.6 | +16.4 |
| United Australia | Eric Spooner | 21,746 | 37.3 | −10.6 |
| State Labor | Walter Evans | 4,633 | 7.9 | +1.3 |
| One Parliament | Donald Brown | 2,550 | 4.4 | +4.4 |
| Independent | Roberta Galagher | 480 | 0.8 | +0.8 |
| Total formal votes | | 58,336 | 97.1 | |
| Informal votes | | 1,762 | 2.9 | |
| Turnout | | 60,098 | 95.0 | |
Two-party-preferred result
| Labor | Thomas Williams | | 58.9 | +9.2 |
| United Australia | Eric Spooner | | 41.1 | −9.2 |
| Labor gain from United Australia | | Swing | +9.2 | |

=== Warringah ===
1943 Australian federal election: Warringah
| Party | Candidate | Votes | % | ±% |
|---|---|---|---|---|
| United Australia | Percy Spender | 34,177 | 48.5 | −20.3 |
| Labor | Ronald Ashworth | 23,723 | 33.7 | +22.7 |
| Independent | Stephen Stack | 9,381 | 13.3 | +13.3 |
| Independent | Gerald Robinson | 1,644 | 2.3 | +2.3 |
| One Parliament | Douglas Morris | 1,078 | 1.5 | +1.5 |
| Independent Middle Class | Edward Doherty | 425 | 0.6 | +0.6 |
| Total formal votes | | 70,428 | 97.5 | |
| Informal votes | | 1,773 | 2.5 | |
| Turnout | | 72,201 | 95.5 | |
Two-party-preferred result
| United Australia | Percy Spender | 42,600 | 60.5 | −15.0 |
| Labor | Ronald Ashworth | 27,828 | 39.5 | +15.0 |
| United Australia hold | | Swing | −15.0 | |

=== Watson ===
1943 Australian federal election: Watson
| Party | Candidate | Votes | % | ±% |
|---|---|---|---|---|
| Labor | Max Falstein | 35,400 | 52.3 | +18.0 |
| United Australia | Norman Whitfield | 18,588 | 27.5 | −17.5 |
| State Labor | Richard Wilson | 5,662 | 8.4 | −1.2 |
| Ind. United Australia | Les Fingleton | 2,304 | 3.4 | +3.4 |
| Liberal Democratic | Arthur Dudley | 2,218 | 3.3 | +3.3 |
| Independent | Harry Yates | 1,942 | 2.9 | +2.9 |
| Ind. United Australia | Hubert O'Connell | 1,579 | 2.3 | +2.3 |
| Total formal votes | | 67,693 | 95.9 | |
| Informal votes | | 2,873 | 4.1 | |
| Turnout | | 70,566 | 98.0 | |
Two-party-preferred result
| Labor | Max Falstein | | 62.1 | +10.1 |
| United Australia | Norman Whitfield | | 37.9 | −10.1 |
| Labor hold | | Swing | +10.1 | |

=== Wentworth ===
1943 Australian federal election: Wentworth
| Party | Candidate | Votes | % | ±% |
|---|---|---|---|---|
| Labor | Jessie Street | 31,048 | 43.5 | +20.4 |
| United Australia | Eric Harrison | 23,519 | 32.9 | −32.7 |
| National Government | Bill Wentworth | 14,875 | 20.8 | +20.8 |
| Liberal Democratic | Charles Mayo | 1,654 | 2.3 | +2.3 |
| Independent | Thomas Whitehouse | 311 | 0.4 | +0.4 |
| Total formal votes | | 71,407 | 97.4 | |
| Informal votes | | 1,897 | 2.6 | |
| Turnout | | 73,304 | 98.5 | |
Two-party-preferred result
| United Australia | Eric Harrison | 36,871 | 51.6 | −14.2 |
| Labor | Jessie Street | 34,536 | 48.4 | +14.2 |
| United Australia hold | | Swing | −14.2 | |

=== Werriwa ===
1943 Australian federal election: Werriwa
| Party | Candidate | Votes | % | ±% |
|---|---|---|---|---|
| Labor | Bert Lazzarini | 46,346 | 68.7 | +27.2 |
| One Parliament | Arthur Brown | 12,996 | 19.3 | +19.3 |
| Independent | Michel Kartzoff | 8,122 | 12.0 | +12.0 |
| Total formal votes | | 67,464 | 97.8 | |
| Informal votes | | 1,520 | 2.2 | |
| Turnout | | 68,984 | 95.3 | |
Two-candidate-preferred result
| Labor | Bert Lazzarini | | 74.7 | +9.6 |
| One Parliament | Arthur Brown | | 25.3 | +25.3 |
| Labor hold | | Swing | +9.6 | |

=== West Sydney ===
1943 Australian federal election: West Sydney
| Party | Candidate | Votes | % | ±% |
|---|---|---|---|---|
| Labor | Jack Beasley | 34,404 | 69.7 | +47.7 |
| State Labor | Horace Foley | 9,166 | 18.6 | +14.5 |
| One Parliament | Eddington Sherwood | 4,481 | 9.1 | +9.1 |
| Independent | Malinda Ivey | 957 | 1.9 | +1.9 |
| Soldiers Labor | William McCristal | 352 | 0.7 | +0.7 |
| Total formal votes | | 49,360 | 96.6 | |
| Informal votes | | 1,748 | 3.4 | |
| Turnout | | 51,108 | 94.9 | |
Two-party-preferred result
| Labor | Jack Beasley | | 79.2 | +43.5 |
| State Labor | Horace Foley | | 20.8 | +20.8 |
| Labor gain from Labor (N-C) | | Swing | +43.5 | |

== Victoria ==
1943 Australian federal election (Victoria)
| ← 1940 | 21 August 1943 | 1946 → |

All 20 Victorian seats in the House of Representatives 14 seats needed for a majority
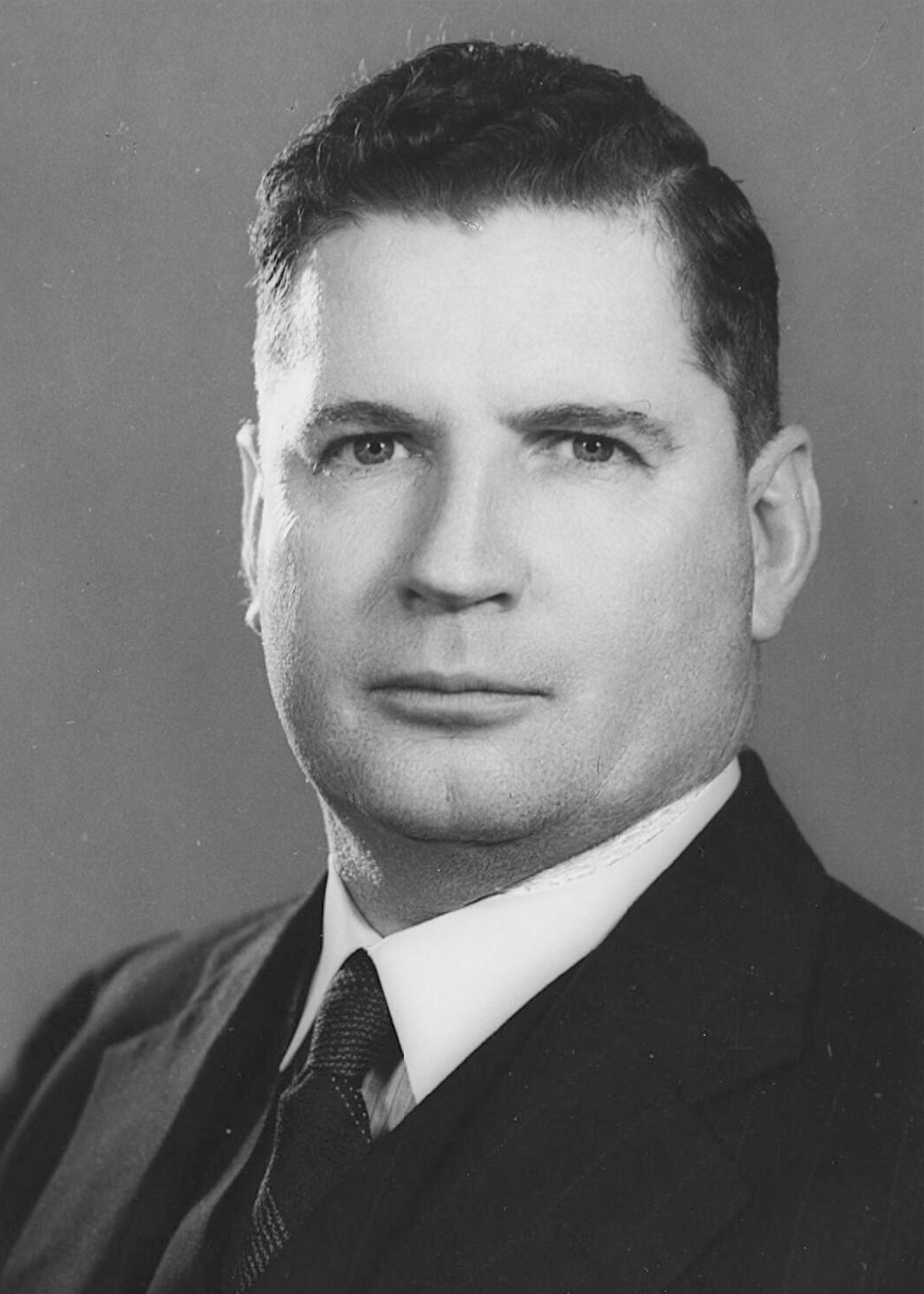

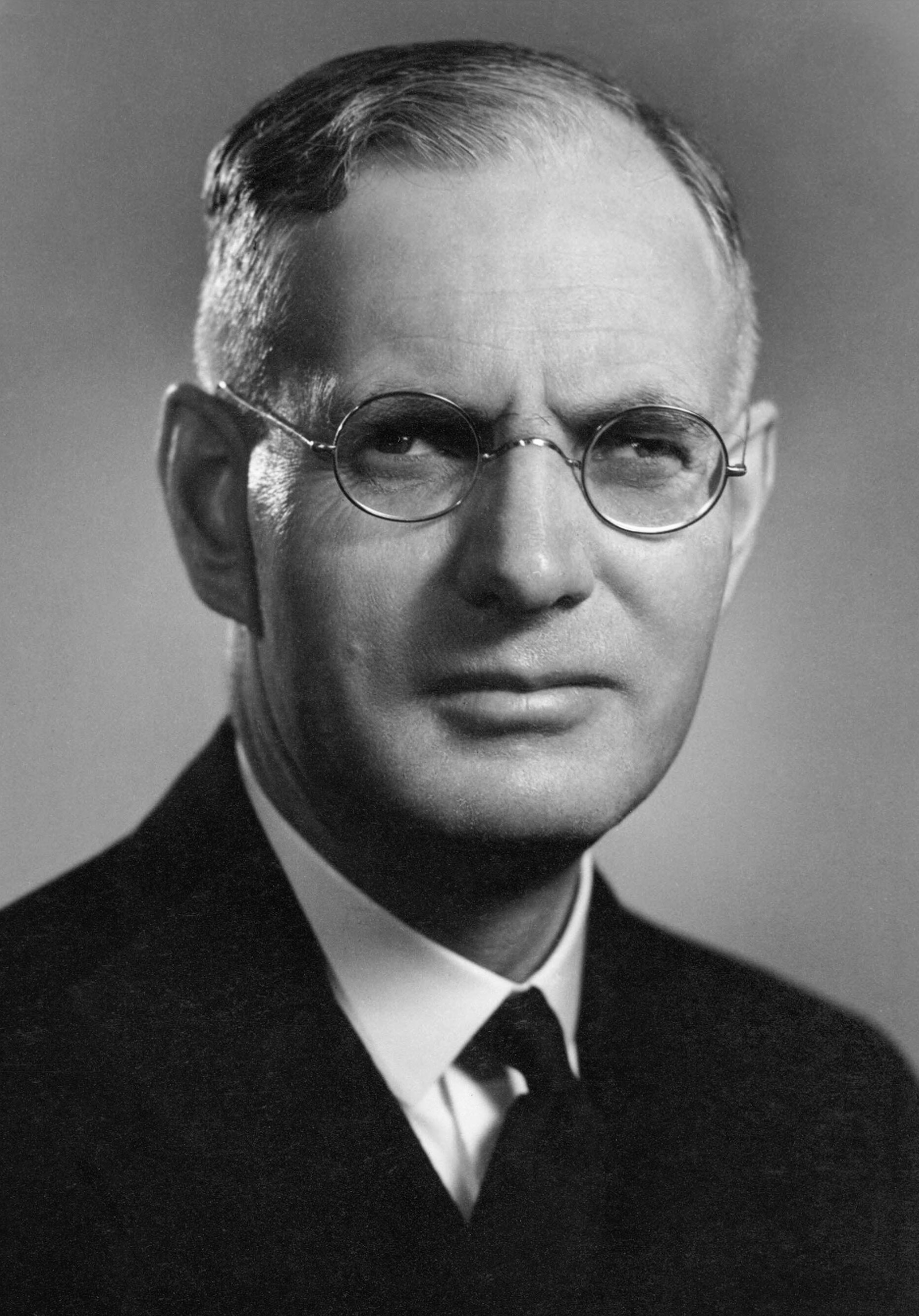
| | First party | Second party |
|---|---|---|
| Leader | Arthur Fadden | John Curtin |
| Party | Coalition | Labor |
| Seats before | 9 | 9 |
| Seats won | 9 | 9 |
| Seat change | Steady | Steady |
| Popular vote | 361,581 | 518,600 |
| Percentage | 30.8% | 44.1% |
| Swing | ▼12.0pp | ▲0.6pp |

=== Balaclava ===
1943 Australian federal election: Balaclava
| Party | Candidate | Votes | % | ±% |
|---|---|---|---|---|
| United Australia | Thomas White | 38,698 | 51.6 | −12.4 |
| Labor | John Barry | 27,281 | 36.3 | +11.3 |
| Independent | Frank Barnes | 4,087 | 5.4 | +5.4 |
| Independent | Constance Duncan | 2,900 | 3.9 | +3.9 |
| Progressive | Helen Maxwell | 1,680 | 2.2 | +2.2 |
| Independent | George Morris | 409 | 0.5 | +0.5 |
| Total formal votes | | 75,055 | 96.2 | |
| Informal votes | | 3,964 | 3.8 | |
| Turnout | | 78,019 | 98.4 | |
Two-party-preferred result
| United Australia | Thomas White | | 56.6 | −12.0 |
| Labor | John Barry | | 43.4 | +12.0 |
| United Australia hold | | Swing | −12.0 | |

=== Ballaarat ===
1943 Australian federal election: Ballaarat
| Party | Candidate | Votes | % | ±% |
|---|---|---|---|---|
| Labor | Reg Pollard | 26,428 | 54.5 | +6.7 |
| United Australia | Bill Roff | 19,750 | 40.7 | +0.6 |
| Christian Independent | Gordon Irish | 2,333 | 4.8 | +4.8 |
| Total formal votes | | 48,511 | 99.0 | |
| Informal votes | | 480 | 1.0 | |
| Turnout | | 48,991 | 97.6 | |
Two-party-preferred result
| Labor | Reg Pollard | | 57.9 | +7.6 |
| United Australia | Bill Roff | | 42.1 | −7.6 |
| Labor hold | | Swing | +7.6 | |

=== Batman ===
1943 Australian federal election: Batman
| Party | Candidate | Votes | % | ±% |
|---|---|---|---|---|
| Labor | Frank Brennan | 42,073 | 64.3 | +4.6 |
| United Australia | Arthur McAdam | 13,647 | 20.9 | −19.4 |
| Services and Citizens | Ian Malloch | 7,635 | 11.7 | +11.7 |
| Independent | Joseph Cahir | 1,090 | 1.7 | +1.7 |
| Independent | Christina Debney | 590 | 0.9 | +0.9 |
| Services | Gordon Currie | 380 | 0.6 | +0.6 |
| Total formal votes | | 65,415 | 96.9 | |
| Informal votes | | 2,070 | 3.1 | |
| Turnout | | 67,485 | 98.4 | |
Two-party-preferred result
| Labor | Frank Brennan | | 74.6 | +14.9 |
| United Australia | Arthur McAdam | | 25.4 | −14.9 |
| Labor hold | | Swing | +14.9 | |

=== Bendigo ===
1943 Australian federal election: Bendigo
| Party | Candidate | Votes | % | ±% |
|---|---|---|---|---|
| Country | George Rankin | 20,050 | 44.9 | −4.4 |
| Labor | Bert de Grandi | 19,107 | 42.8 | +4.7 |
| Ind. United Australia | Morton Garner | 2,151 | 4.8 | +4.8 |
| Independent | John Crawford | 2,089 | 4.7 | +4.7 |
| Independent Labor | William Banks | 1,292 | 2.9 | +2.9 |
| Total formal votes | | 44,689 | 97.5 | |
| Informal votes | | 1,169 | 2.5 | |
| Turnout | | 45,858 | 96.7 | |
Two-party-preferred result
| Country | George Rankin | 23,386 | 52.3 | −5.2 |
| Labor | Bert de Grandi | 21,303 | 47.7 | +5.2 |
| Country hold | | Swing | −5.2 | |

=== Bourke ===
1943 Australian federal election: Bourke
| Party | Candidate | Votes | % | ±% |
|---|---|---|---|---|
| Independent Labor | Maurice Blackburn | 26,494 | 40.4 | +40.4 |
| Labor | Bill Bryson | 24,722 | 37.7 | −28.5 |
| United Australia | David Smith | 12,004 | 18.3 | −15.5 |
| Independent | John March | 2,404 | 3.7 | +3.7 |
| Total formal votes | | 65,624 | 97.8 | |
| Informal votes | | 1,468 | 2.2 | |
| Turnout | | 67,092 | 96.6 | |
Two-party-preferred result
| Labor | Bill Bryson | 35,162 | 53.6 | −12.6 |
| Independent Labor | Maurice Blackburn | 30,462 | 46.4 | +46.4 |
| Labor hold | | Swing | −12.6 | |

=== Corangamite ===
1943 Australian federal election: Corangamite
| Party | Candidate | Votes | % | ±% |
|---|---|---|---|---|
| United Australia | Allan McDonald | 21,655 | 47.2 | −9.0 |
| Labor | Harold Miller | 20,691 | 45.1 | +1.3 |
| Independent | Elsie Brushfield | 1,856 | 4.0 | +4.0 |
| Independent Country | Sydney Donaldson | 1,643 | 3.6 | +3.6 |
| Total formal votes | | 45,845 | 98.9 | |
| Informal votes | | 515 | 1.1 | |
| Turnout | | 46,360 | 96.6 | |
Two-party-preferred result
| United Australia | Allan McDonald | 24,342 | 53.1 | −3.1 |
| Labor | Harold Miller | 21,503 | 46.9 | +3.1 |
| United Australia hold | | Swing | −3.1 | |

=== Corio ===
1943 Australian federal election: Corio
| Party | Candidate | Votes | % | ±% |
|---|---|---|---|---|
| Labor | John Dedman | 30,578 | 52.3 | −0.3 |
| Independent | Neil Freeman | 16,013 | 27.4 | +27.4 |
| United Australia | Rupert Curnow | 10,255 | 17.5 | −22.4 |
| Progressive | James Baker | 1,589 | 2.7 | +2.7 |
| Total formal votes | | 58,435 | 98.5 | |
| Informal votes | | 908 | 1.5 | |
| Turnout | | 59,343 | 97.1 | |
Two-party-preferred result
| Labor | John Dedman | | 54.8 | −1.6 |
| Independent | Neil Freeman | | 45.2 | +45.2 |
| Labor hold | | Swing | −1.6 | |

=== Deakin ===
1943 Australian federal election: Deakin
| Party | Candidate | Votes | % | ±% |
|---|---|---|---|---|
| Labor | Frank Williamson | 22,356 | 37.7 | +5.4 |
| United Australia | William Hutchinson | 19,375 | 32.7 | −22.1 |
| Independent | Robert Elliott | 10,318 | 17.4 | +17.4 |
| Middle Class | Alan Coffey | 4,185 | 7.1 | +7.1 |
| Ind. United Australia | Dick Radclyffe | 1,526 | 2.6 | +2.6 |
| Independent | Arthur Coles | 1,471 | 2.5 | +2.5 |
| Total formal votes | | 59,231 | 97.1 | |
| Informal votes | | 1,760 | 2.9 | |
| Turnout | | 60,991 | 96.4 | |
Two-party-preferred result
| United Australia | William Hutchinson | 33,577 | 56.7 | −5.5 |
| Labor | Frank Williamson | 25,654 | 43.3 | +5.5 |
| United Australia hold | | Swing | −5.5 | |

=== Fawkner ===
1943 Australian federal election: Fawkner
| Party | Candidate | Votes | % | ±% |
|---|---|---|---|---|
| United Australia | Harold Holt | 23,931 | 33.4 | −27.4 |
| Labor | Thomas Jude | 23,508 | 32.8 | −3.0 |
| Independent | William Cremor | 15,958 | 22.3 | +22.3 |
| Independent | Vernon Margetts | 3,437 | 4.8 | +4.8 |
| Communist | Malcolm Good | 3,300 | 4.6 | +4.6 |
| Independent | Charles Kennett | 1,196 | 1.7 | +1.7 |
| Independent | Ruth Ravenscroft | 381 | 0.5 | +0.5 |
| Total formal votes | | 71,711 | 95.6 | |
| Informal votes | | 3,275 | 4.4 | |
| Turnout | | 74,986 | 92.9 | |
Two-party-preferred result
| United Australia | Harold Holt | 41,602 | 58.0 | −4.5 |
| Labor | Thomas Jude | 30,109 | 42.0 | +4.5 |
| United Australia hold | | Swing | −4.5 | |

=== Flinders ===
1943 Australian federal election: Flinders
| Party | Candidate | Votes | % | ±% |
|---|---|---|---|---|
| Labor | Frank Lee | 24,132 | 39.6 | +11.9 |
| United Australia | Rupert Ryan | 22,395 | 36.8 | −2.9 |
| Country | Morton Moyes | 6,867 | 11.3 | +11.3 |
| Australian Women's Party | Mabel Brookes | 5,305 | 8.7 | +8.7 |
| Independent | Rupert Clark | 2,198 | 3.6 | +3.6 |
| Total formal votes | | 60,897 | 97.1 | |
| Informal votes | | 1,817 | 2.9 | |
| Turnout | | 62,714 | 95.2 | |
Two-party-preferred result
| United Australia | Rupert Ryan | 31,518 | 51.8 | −6.6 |
| Labor | Frank Lee | 29,379 | 48.2 | +6.6 |
| United Australia hold | | Swing | −6.6 | |

=== Gippsland ===
1943 Australian federal election: Gippsland
| Party | Candidate | Votes | % | ±% |
|---|---|---|---|---|
| Labor | Wally Williames | 22,358 | 45.1 | +11.6 |
| Country | George Bowden | 18,104 | 36.5 | −23.0 |
| Services and Citizens | Herbert Birch | 5,313 | 10.7 | +10.7 |
| Independent Democrat | Stephen Ashton | 2,734 | 5.5 | +5.5 |
| One Parliament | Melvyn Morgan | 1,119 | 2.3 | +2.3 |
| Total formal votes | | 49,628 | 97.9 | |
| Informal votes | | 1,084 | 2.1 | |
| Turnout | | 50,712 | 97.4 | |
Two-party-preferred result
| Country | George Bowden | 25,985 | 52.4 | −4.3 |
| Labor | Wally Williames | 23,643 | 47.6 | +4.3 |
| Country hold | | Swing | −4.3 | |

=== Henty ===
1943 Australian federal election: Henty
| Party | Candidate | Votes | % | ±% |
|---|---|---|---|---|
| Independent | Arthur Coles | 32,885 | 44.5 | −10.1 |
| United Australia | Jo Gullett | 28,123 | 38.1 | +38.1 |
| Independent Labor | Bernard Rees | 4,598 | 6.2 | +6.2 |
| Services and Citizens | Edmund Lind | 4,437 | 6.0 | +6.0 |
| Women for Canberra | Ivy Weber | 2,885 | 3.9 | +3.9 |
| Independent Liberal | Carlyle Ferguson | 928 | 1.3 | +1.3 |
| Total formal votes | | 73,856 | 96.6 | |
| Informal votes | | 2,596 | 3.4 | |
| Turnout | | 76,452 | 97.5 | |
Two-party-preferred result
| Independent | Arthur Coles | | 55.5 | −8.0 |
| United Australia | Jo Gullett | | 44.5 | +44.5 |
| Independent hold | | Swing | −8.0 | |

=== Indi ===
1943 Australian federal election: Indi
| Party | Candidate | Votes | % | ±% |
|---|---|---|---|---|
| Country | John McEwen | 29,471 | 58.8 | −2.7 |
| Labor | Charles Sandford | 18,767 | 37.4 | −1.1 |
| Communist | Gerry O'Day | 1,919 | 3.8 | +3.8 |
| Total formal votes | | 50,157 | 98.8 | |
| Informal votes | | 599 | 1.2 | |
| Turnout | | 50,756 | 96.0 | |
Two-party-preferred result
| Country | John McEwen | | 59.2 | −2.3 |
| Labor | Charles Sandford | | 40.8 | +2.3 |
| Country hold | | Swing | −2.3 | |

=== Kooyong ===
1943 Australian federal election: Kooyong
| Party | Candidate | Votes | % | ±% |
|---|---|---|---|---|
| United Australia | Robert Menzies | 37,988 | 48.6 | −14.3 |
| Labor | Albert Nicholls | 20,912 | 26.7 | +6.1 |
| Middle Class | John Nimmo | 10,601 | 13.5 | +13.5 |
| Communist | Ted Laurie | 6,402 | 8.2 | +8.2 |
| Christian Independent | Gwendolyn Noad | 2,338 | 3.0 | +3.0 |
| Total formal votes | | 78,241 | 98.0 | |
| Informal votes | | 1,599 | 2.0 | |
| Turnout | | 79,840 | 97.2 | |
Two-party-preferred result
| United Australia | Robert Menzies | | 62.5 | −7.6 |
| Labor | Albert Nicholls | | 37.5 | +7.6 |
| United Australia hold | | Swing | −7.6 | |

=== Maribyrnong ===
1943 Australian federal election: Maribyrnong
| Party | Candidate | Votes | % | ±% |
|---|---|---|---|---|
| Labor | Arthur Drakeford | 48,441 | 67.6 | +3.0 |
| United Australia | Albert Pennell | 14,469 | 20.2 | −15.2 |
| Christian Candidate Movement | Robert Firebrace | 7,478 | 10.4 | +10.4 |
| Anti-Conscription Labour | Kenneth Kenafick | 1,254 | 1.8 | +1.8 |
| Total formal votes | | 71,642 | 97.8 | |
| Informal votes | | 1,640 | 2.2 | |
| Turnout | | 73,282 | 97.5 | |
Two-party-preferred result
| Labor | Arthur Drakeford | | 74.5 | +9.9 |
| United Australia | Albert Pennell | | 25.5 | −9.9 |
| Labor hold | | Swing | +9.9 | |

=== Melbourne ===
1943 Australian federal election: Melbourne
| Party | Candidate | Votes | % | ±% |
|---|---|---|---|---|
| Labor | Arthur Calwell | 37,779 | 63.8 | +11.9 |
| United Australia | Elizabeth Couchman | 10,319 | 17.4 | −6.5 |
| Communist | Ken Miller | 5,477 | 9.3 | +9.3 |
| Middle Class | Louis Bickart | 4,119 | 7.0 | +7.0 |
| Independent | Charles Dicker | 808 | 1.4 | +1.4 |
| Services | Noble Kerby | 680 | 1.1 | +1.1 |
| Total formal votes | | 59,182 | 93.9 | |
| Informal votes | | 3,848 | 6.1 | |
| Turnout | | 63,030 | 91.5 | |
Two-party-preferred result
| Labor | Arthur Calwell | | 75.2 | +4.1 |
| United Australia | Elizabeth Couchman | | 24.8 | −4.1 |
| Labor hold | | Swing | +4.1 | |

=== Melbourne Ports ===
1943 Australian federal election: Melbourne Ports
| Party | Candidate | Votes | % | ±% |
|---|---|---|---|---|
| Labor | Jack Holloway | 47,149 | 72.8 | +6.7 |
| United Australia | Frank Preacher | 17,629 | 27.2 | −6.7 |
| Total formal votes | | 64,778 | 97.6 | |
| Informal votes | | 1,612 | 2.4 | |
| Turnout | | 66,390 | 95.7 | |
| Labor hold | | Swing | +6.7 | |

=== Wannon ===
1943 Australian federal election: Wannon
| Party | Candidate | Votes | % | ±% |
|---|---|---|---|---|
| Labor | Don McLeod | 25,609 | 51.4 | +2.8 |
| Country | Leonard Rodda | 10,778 | 21.6 | +21.6 |
| United Australia | John Menadue | 9,248 | 18.6 | −23.6 |
| Ind. United Australia | Thomas Scholfield | 4,190 | 8.4 | +8.4 |
| Total formal votes | | 49,825 | 98.9 | |
| Informal votes | | 555 | 1.1 | |
| Turnout | | 50,380 | 98.3 | |
Two-party-preferred result
| Labor | Don McLeod | | 54.1 | +0.4 |
| United Australia | John Menadue | | 45.9 | −0.4 |
| Labor hold | | Swing | +0.4 | |

=== Wimmera ===
1943 Australian federal election: Wimmera
| Party | Candidate | Votes | % | ±% |
|---|---|---|---|---|
| Independent | Alexander Wilson | 26,479 | 62.3 | +18.3 |
| Independent Country | Reginald Skeat | 10,976 | 25.8 | +25.8 |
| Independent Country | Albert Thompson | 3,219 | 7.6 | +7.6 |
| Independent | Herbert Follett | 1,449 | 3.4 | +3.4 |
| Independent Country | Eric Phillips | 378 | 0.9 | +0.9 |
| Total formal votes | | 42,501 | 97.9 | |
| Informal votes | | 930 | 2.1 | |
| Turnout | | 43,431 | 96.6 | |
Two-party-preferred result
| Independent | Alexander Wilson | | 67.2 | +1.0 |
| Independent Country | Reginald Skeat | | 32.8 | +32.8 |
| Independent hold | | Swing | +1.0 | |

=== Yarra ===
1943 Australian federal election: Yarra
| Party | Candidate | Votes | % | ±% |
|---|---|---|---|---|
| Labor | James Scullin | 36,709 | 60.4 | +3.0 |
| United Australia | Gilbert Jenkin | 11,294 | 18.6 | −14.9 |
| Communist | Ralph Gibson | 6,585 | 10.8 | +10.8 |
| Services and Citizens | William Jinkins | 5,138 | 8.5 | +8.5 |
| Independent | Allan MacDonald | 1,065 | 1.8 | +1.8 |
| Total formal votes | | 60,791 | 95.9 | |
| Informal votes | | 2,632 | 4.1 | |
| Turnout | | 63,423 | 94.9 | |
Two-party-preferred result
| Labor | James Scullin | | 74.3 | +8.7 |
| United Australia | Gilbert Jenkin | | 25.7 | −8.7 |
| Labor hold | | Swing | +8.7 | |

== Queensland ==
1943 Australian federal election (Queensland)
| ← 1940 | 21 August 1943 | 1946 → |

All 10 Queensland seats in the House of Representatives 5 seats needed for a majority
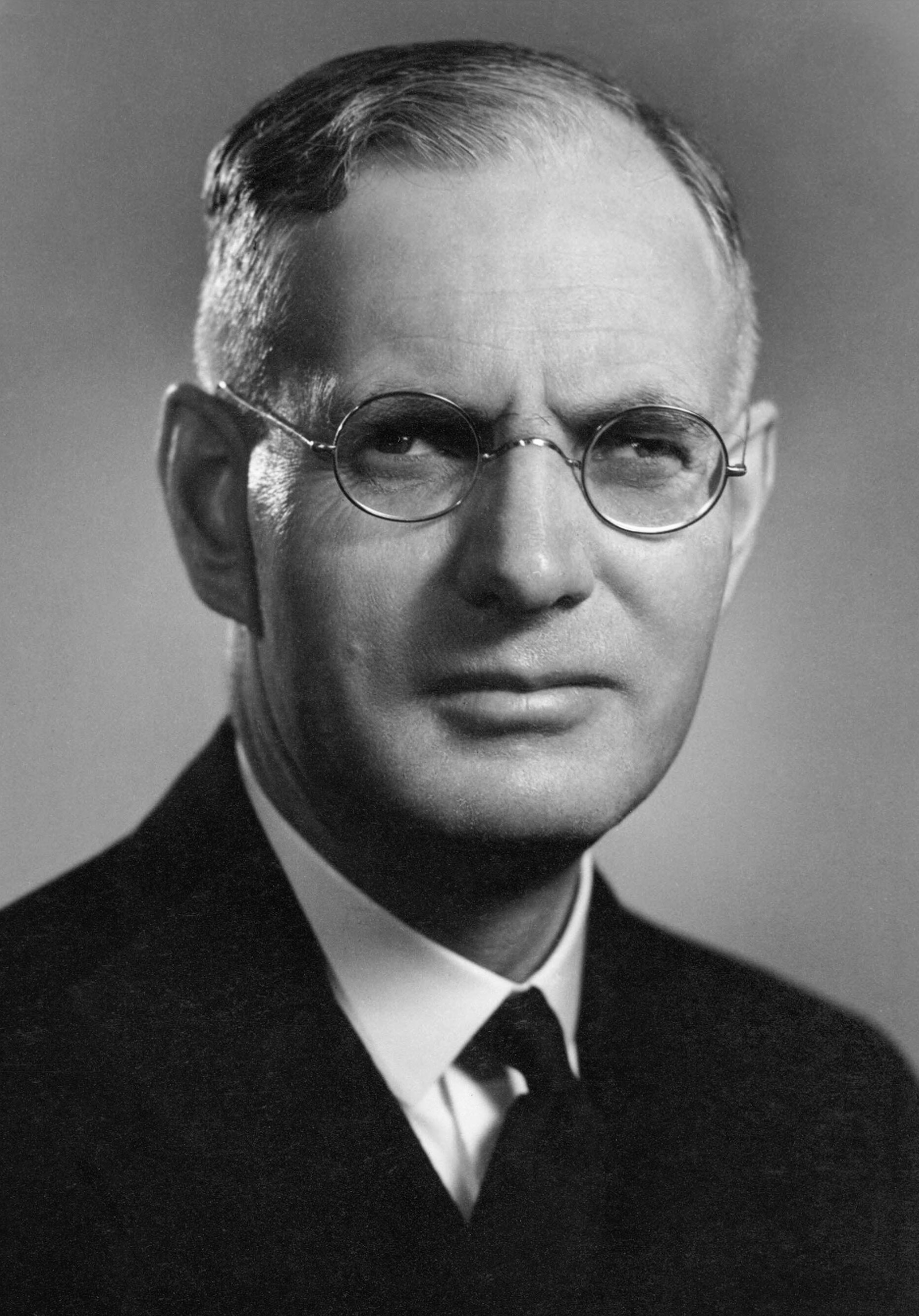

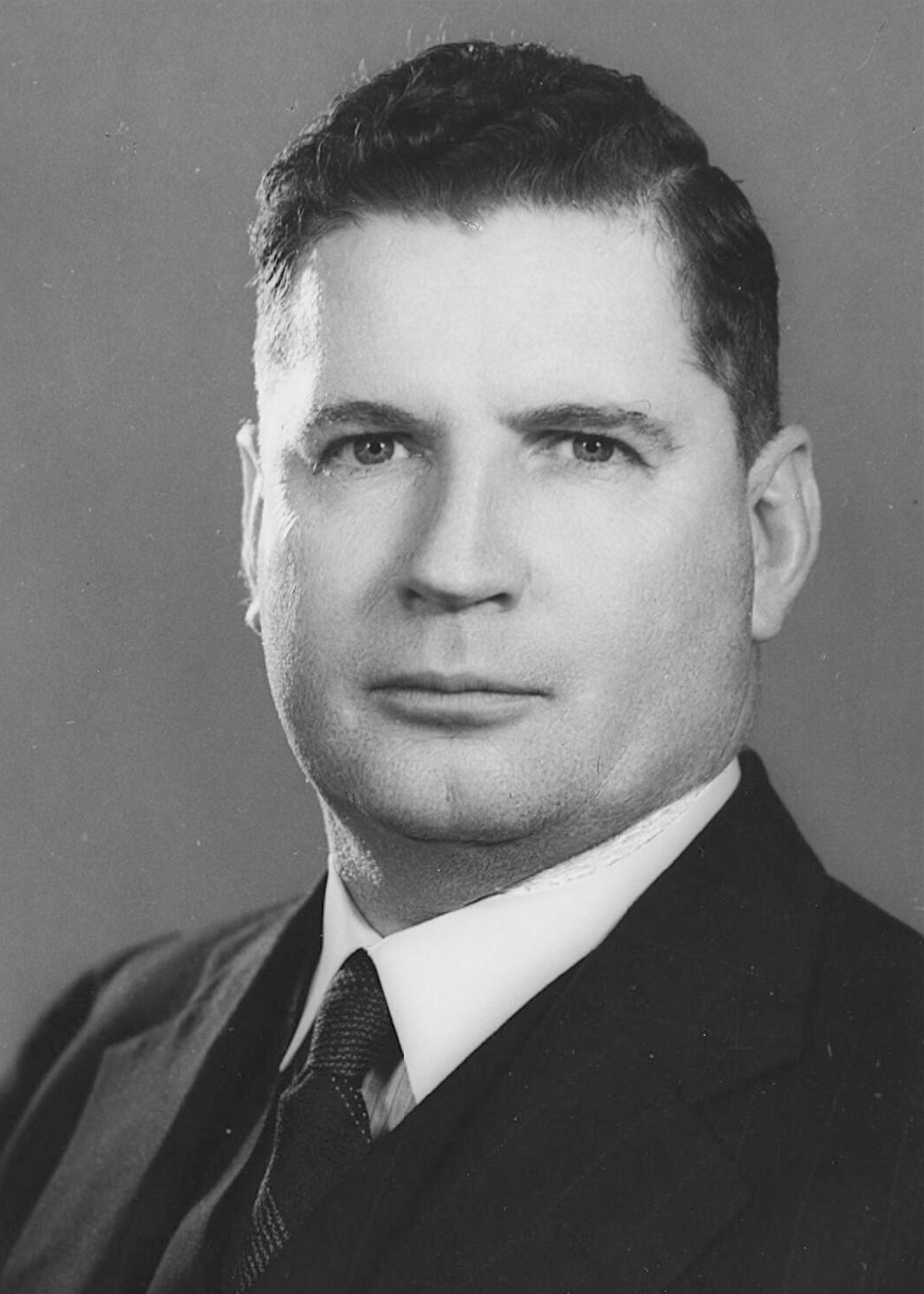
| | First party | Second party |
|---|---|---|
| Leader | John Curtin | Arthur Fadden |
| Party | Labor | Coalition |
| Seats before | 5 | 5 |
| Seats won | 6 | 4 |
| Seat change | ▲1 | ▼1 |
| Popular vote | 279,372 | 227,615 |
| Percentage | 47.8% | 39.0% |
| Swing | ▲1.7pp | ▼9.9pp |

=== Brisbane ===
1943 Australian federal election: Brisbane
| Party | Candidate | Votes | % | ±% |
|---|---|---|---|---|
| Labor | George Lawson | 31,099 | 50.9 | +0.5 |
| Independent Democrat | Bruce Pie | 17,317 | 28.3 | +28.3 |
| United Australia | John Fletcher | 10,976 | 18.0 | −31.6 |
| One Parliament | Robert Boardman | 1,701 | 2.8 | +2.8 |
| Total formal votes | | 61,093 | 97.0 | |
| Informal votes | | 1,908 | 3.0 | |
| Turnout | | 63,001 | 95.3 | |
Two-party-preferred result
| Labor | George Lawson | | 53.6 | +3.2 |
| Independent Democrat | Bruce Pie | | 46.4 | +46.4 |
| Labor hold | | Swing | +3.2 | |

=== Capricornia ===
1943 Australian federal election: Capricornia
| Party | Candidate | Votes | % | ±% |
|---|---|---|---|---|
| Labor | Frank Forde | 32,396 | 55.9 | −2.8 |
| United Australia | Charles Ward | 25,597 | 44.1 | +44.1 |
| Total formal votes | | 57,993 | 98.9 | |
| Informal votes | | 627 | 1.1 | |
| Turnout | | 58,620 | 95.7 | |
| Labor hold | | Swing | −2.8 | |

=== Darling Downs ===
1943 Australian federal election: Darling Downs
| Party | Candidate | Votes | % | ±% |
|---|---|---|---|---|
| Country | Arthur Fadden | 26,123 | 48.6 | −9.3 |
| Labor | Leslie Bailey | 23,253 | 43.3 | +1.2 |
| Independent | Raymond Mullaly | 3,398 | 6.3 | +6.3 |
| One Parliament | Hugh Phair | 989 | 1.8 | +1.8 |
| Total formal votes | | 53,763 | 98.4 | |
| Informal votes | | 868 | 1.6 | |
| Turnout | | 54,631 | 97.9 | |
Two-party-preferred result
| Country | Arthur Fadden | 28,232 | 52.5 | −5.4 |
| Labor | Leslie Bailey | 25,531 | 47.5 | +5.4 |
| Country hold | | Swing | −5.4 | |

=== Griffith ===
1943 Australian federal election: Griffith
| Party | Candidate | Votes | % | ±% |
|---|---|---|---|---|
| Labor | William Conelan | 38,138 | 57.4 | +6.9 |
| United Australia | Richard Larking | 19,388 | 29.2 | −20.3 |
| One Parliament | John Carbine | 3,900 | 5.9 | +5.9 |
| Independent | William Kingwell | 3,756 | 5.7 | +5.7 |
| Independent | Theophilus Dunstone | 1,210 | 1.8 | +1.8 |
| Total formal votes | | 66,392 | 96.9 | |
| Informal votes | | 2,115 | 3.1 | |
| Turnout | | 68,507 | 96.3 | |
Two-party-preferred result
| Labor | William Conelan | | 65.1 | +14.6 |
| United Australia | Richard Larking | | 34.9 | −14.6 |
| Labor hold | | Swing | +14.6 | |

=== Herbert ===
1943 Australian federal election: Herbert
| Party | Candidate | Votes | % | ±% |
|---|---|---|---|---|
| Labor | George Martens | 22,697 | 37.6 | −3.1 |
| Communist | Fred Paterson | 20,629 | 34.2 | +34.2 |
| Country | Archie Graham | 13,693 | 22.7 | −12.8 |
| Independent | Charles Cook | 3,300 | 5.5 | +5.5 |
| Total formal votes | | 60,319 | 97.3 | |
| Informal votes | | 1,673 | 2.7 | |
| Turnout | | 61,992 | 91.6 | |
Two-party-preferred result
| Labor | George Martens | 37,219 | 61.7 | +5.3 |
| Communist | Fred Paterson | 23,100 | 38.3 | +38.3 |
| Labor hold | | Swing | +5.3 | |

=== Kennedy ===
1943 Australian federal election: Kennedy
| Party | Candidate | Votes | % | ±% |
|---|---|---|---|---|
| Labor | Bill Riordan | 29,551 | 65.2 | +1.0 |
| Country | Wilfrid Simmonds | 10,769 | 23.8 | −12.0 |
| Independent | Athena Deane | 3,753 | 8.3 | +8.3 |
| Independent | Richard Vane-Millbank | 1,265 | 2.8 | +2.8 |
| Total formal votes | | 45,338 | 96.8 | |
| Informal votes | | 1,483 | 3.2 | |
| Turnout | | 46,821 | 88.0 | |
Two-party-preferred result
| Labor | Bill Riordan | | 71.7 | +7.5 |
| Country | Wilfrid Simmonds | | 28.3 | −7.5 |
| Labor hold | | Swing | +7.5 | |

=== Lilley ===
1943 Australian federal election: Lilley
| Party | Candidate | Votes | % | ±% |
|---|---|---|---|---|
| United Australia | William Jolly | 30,992 | 45.8 | −12.3 |
| Labor | Jim Hadley | 30,882 | 45.7 | +6.8 |
| One Parliament | Hans Beiers | 4,555 | 6.7 | +6.7 |
| Independent | James Julin | 1,191 | 1.8 | +1.8 |
| Total formal votes | | 67,620 | 97.6 | |
| Informal votes | | 1,653 | 2.4 | |
| Turnout | | 69,273 | 97.8 | |
Two-party-preferred result
| Labor | Jim Hadley | 34,051 | 50.4 | +9.9 |
| United Australia | William Jolly | 33,569 | 49.6 | −9.9 |
| Labor gain from United Australia | | Swing | +9.9 | |

=== Maranoa ===
1943 Australian federal election: Maranoa
| Party | Candidate | Votes | % | ±% |
|---|---|---|---|---|
| Country | Charles Adermann | 26,963 | 51.0 | +6.4 |
| Labor | Frank Baker | 25,914 | 49.0 | +1.1 |
| Total formal votes | | 52,877 | 98.7 | |
| Informal votes | | 686 | 1.3 | |
| Turnout | | 53,563 | 92.0 | |
| Country gain from Labor | | Swing | +2.6 | |

=== Moreton ===
1943 Australian federal election: Moreton
| Party | Candidate | Votes | % | ±% |
|---|---|---|---|---|
| United Australia | Josiah Francis | 32,681 | 50.0 | −9.3 |
| Labor | Patrick McInally | 26,804 | 41.0 | +0.2 |
| One Parliament | Ralph Belcham | 3,747 | 5.7 | +5.7 |
| Country | John Cantwell | 2,093 | 3.2 | +3.2 |
| Total formal votes | | 65,325 | 97.7 | |
| Informal votes | | 1,658 | 2.3 | |
| Turnout | | 66,893 | 95.3 | |
Two-party-preferred result
| United Australia | Josiah Francis | | 56.7 | −2.6 |
| Labor | Patrick McInally | | 43.3 | +2.6 |
| United Australia hold | | Swing | −2.6 | |

=== Wide Bay ===
1943 Australian federal election: Wide Bay
| Party | Candidate | Votes | % | ±% |
|---|---|---|---|---|
| Country | Bernard Corser | 20,662 | 38.5 | −2.1 |
| Labor | George Watson | 18,638 | 34.7 | +5.4 |
| Country | James Heading | 7,678 | 14.3 | +14.3 |
| Independent | Henry Madden | 3,750 | 7.0 | +7.0 |
| Independent | Clive Lambourne | 2,988 | 5.6 | +5.6 |
| Total formal votes | | 53,716 | 97.7 | |
| Informal votes | | 1,237 | 2.3 | |
| Turnout | | 54,953 | 95.0 | |
Two-party-preferred result
| Country | Bernard Corser | 30,342 | 56.5 | −2.4 |
| Labor | George Watson | 23,374 | 43.5 | +2.4 |
| Country hold | | Swing | −2.4 | |

== South Australia ==
1943 Australian federal election (South Australia)
| ← 1940 | 21 August 1943 | 1946 → |

All 6 SA seats in the House of Representatives 3 seats needed for a majority
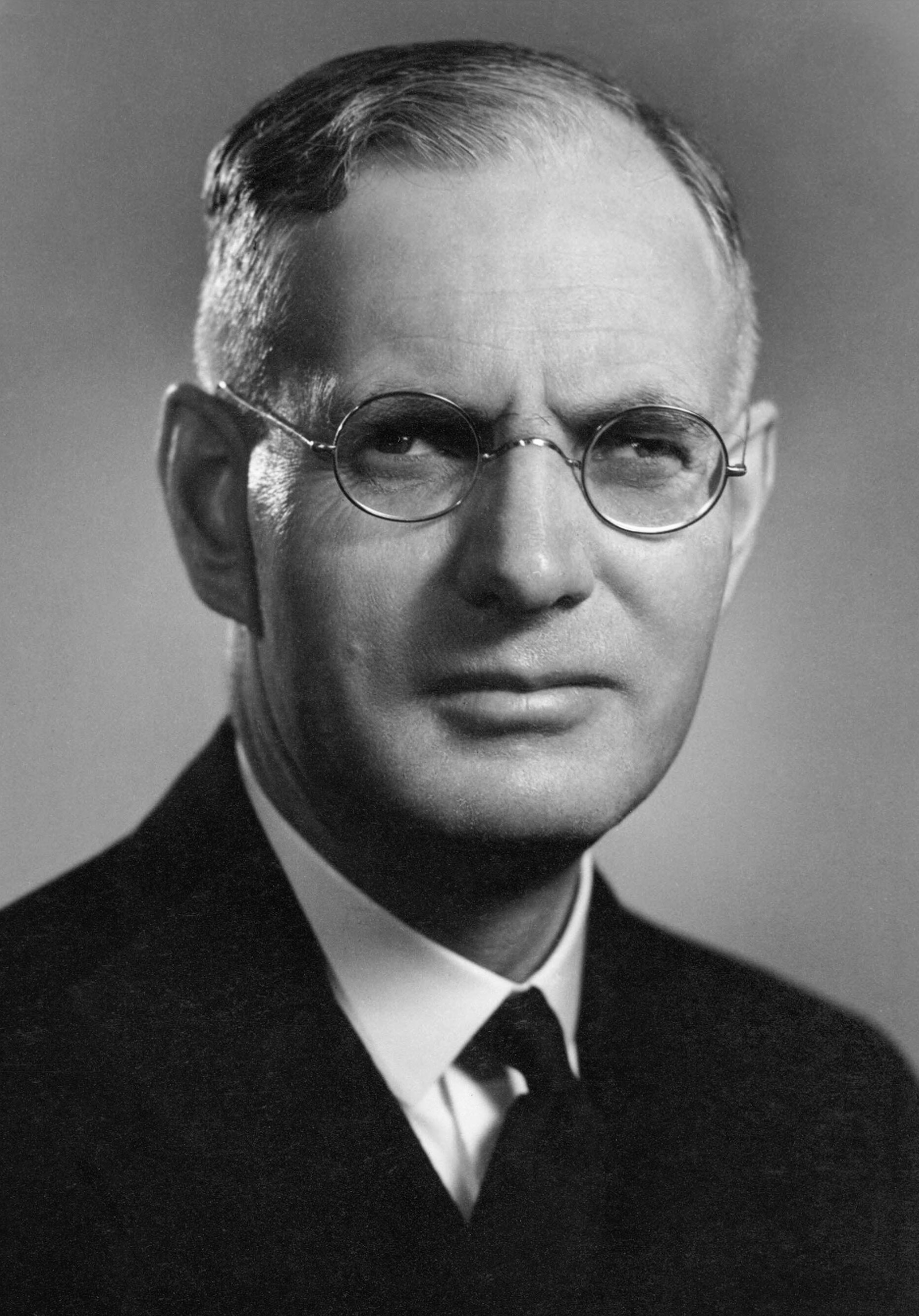

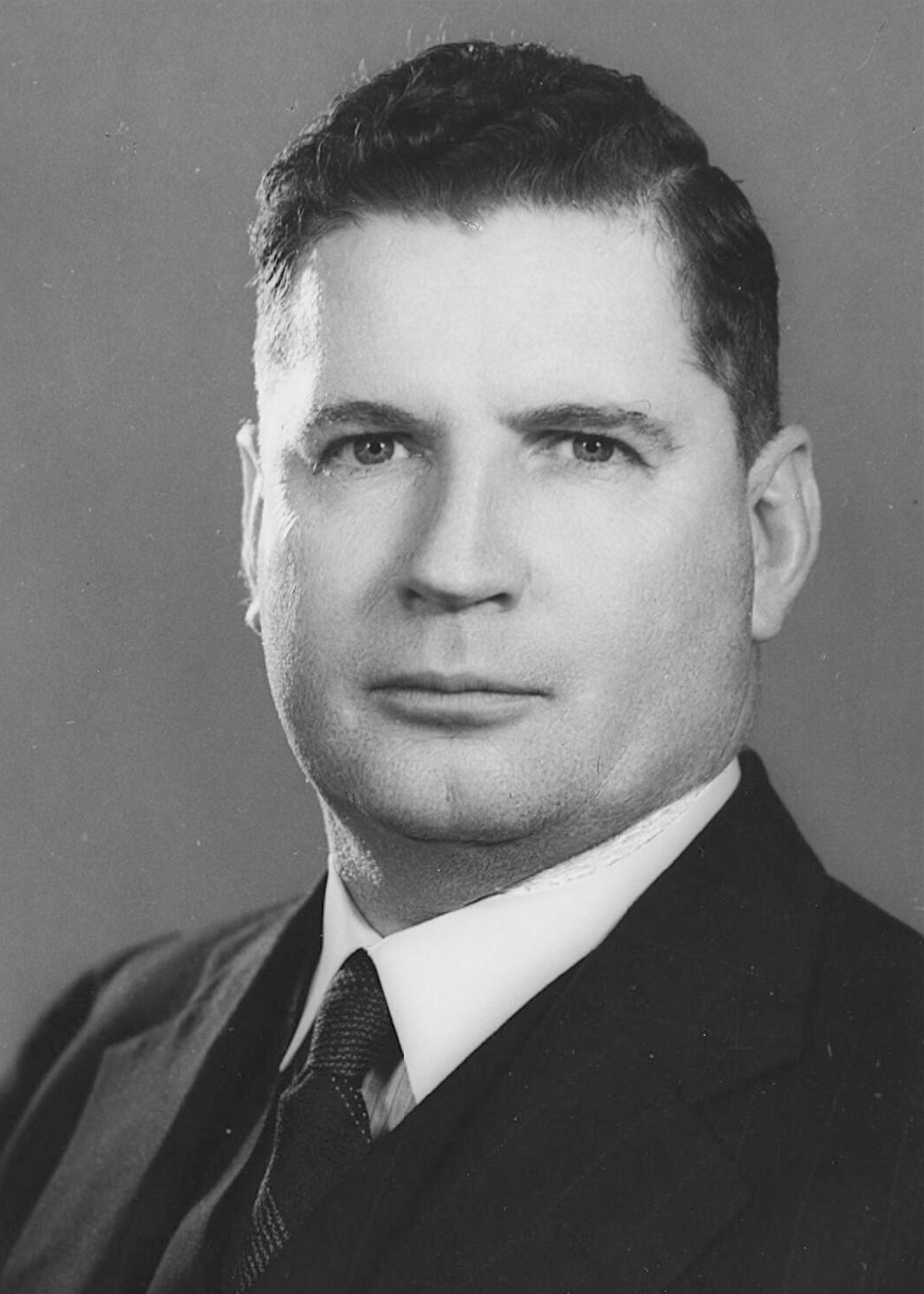
| | First party | Second party |
|---|---|---|
| Leader | John Curtin | Arthur Fadden |
| Party | Labor | Coalition |
| Seats before | 1 | 3 |
| Seats won | 5 | 1 |
| Seat change | ▲4 | ▼2 |
| Popular vote | 203,784 | 145,665 |
| Percentage | 54.4% | 38.9% |
| Swing | ▲14.6pp | ▼14.6pp |

=== Adelaide ===
1943 Australian federal election: Adelaide
| Party | Candidate | Votes | % | ±% |
|---|---|---|---|---|
| Labor | Cyril Chambers | 40,110 | 60.0 | +26.1 |
| United Australia | Fred Stacey | 22,636 | 33.8 | −16.2 |
| Communist | Alf Watt | 2,854 | 4.3 | +4.3 |
| Independent Labor | Edwin Yates | 1,291 | 1.9 | +1.9 |
| Total formal votes | | 66,891 | 96.1 | |
| Informal votes | | 2,714 | 3.9 | |
| Turnout | | 69,605 | 95.8 | |
Two-party-preferred result
| Labor | Cyril Chambers | | 65.6 | +20.3 |
| United Australia | Fred Stacey | | 34.4 | −20.3 |
| Labor gain from United Australia | | Swing | +20.3 | |

=== Barker ===
1943 Australian federal election: Barker
| Party | Candidate | Votes | % | ±% |
|---|---|---|---|---|
| United Australia | Archie Cameron | 24,616 | 40.6 | +40.6 |
| Labor | Harry Krantz | 24,240 | 40.0 | +13.3 |
| Independent | Frank Halleday | 10,508 | 17.3 | +17.3 |
| Independent | John Gartner | 1,222 | 2.0 | +2.0 |
| Total formal votes | | 60,586 | 97.1 | |
| Informal votes | | 1,816 | 2.9 | |
| Turnout | | 62,402 | 97.5 | |
Two-party-preferred result
| United Australia | Archie Cameron | 31,294 | 51.7 | +51.7 |
| Labor | Harry Krantz | 29,292 | 48.3 | +14.2 |
| United Australia gain from Country | | Swing | −14.2 | |

=== Boothby ===
1943 Australian federal election: Boothby
| Party | Candidate | Votes | % | ±% |
|---|---|---|---|---|
| United Australia | Grenfell Price | 32,869 | 45.0 | −12.4 |
| Labor | Thomas Sheehy | 30,896 | 42.3 | +14.3 |
| Communist | Alan Finger | 6,986 | 9.6 | +9.6 |
| Constructive Democrat | John Turner | 2,331 | 3.2 | +3.2 |
| Total formal votes | | 73,082 | 96.6 | |
| Informal votes | | 2,597 | 3.4 | |
| Turnout | | 75,679 | 97.4 | |
Two-party-preferred result
| Labor | Thomas Sheehy | 37,190 | 50.9 | +16.1 |
| United Australia | Grenfell Price | 35,892 | 49.1 | −16.1 |
| Labor gain from United Australia | | Swing | +16.1 | |

=== Grey ===
1943 Australian federal election: Grey
| Party | Candidate | Votes | % | ±% |
|---|---|---|---|---|
| Labor | Edgar Russell | 25,735 | 52.5 | +15.1 |
| United Australia | Oliver Badman | 23,285 | 47.5 | +47.5 |
| Total formal votes | | 49,020 | 97.5 | |
| Informal votes | | 1,241 | 2.5 | |
| Turnout | | 50,261 | 96.5 | |
| Labor gain from Country | | Swing | +10.2 | |

=== Hindmarsh ===
1943 Australian federal election: Hindmarsh
| Party | Candidate | Votes | % | ±% |
|---|---|---|---|---|
| Labor | Norman Makin | 56,359 | 76.8 | +11.1 |
| United Australia | James Butler | 17,030 | 23.2 | −11.1 |
| Total formal votes | | 73,389 | 97.6 | |
| Informal votes | | 1,824 | 2.4 | |
| Turnout | | 75,213 | 97.5 | |
| Labor hold | | Swing | +11.1 | |

=== Wakefield ===
1943 Australian federal election: Wakefield
| Party | Candidate | Votes | % | ±% |
|---|---|---|---|---|
| Labor | Albert Smith | 26,444 | 51.2 | +4.6 |
| United Australia | Jack Duncan-Hughes | 25,229 | 48.8 | −4.6 |
| Total formal votes | | 51,673 | 97.5 | |
| Informal votes | | 1,327 | 2.5 | |
| Turnout | | 53,000 | 96.5 | |
| Labor gain from United Australia | | Swing | +4.6 | |

== Western Australia ==
1943 Australian federal election (Western Australia)
| ← 1940 | 21 August 1943 | 1946 → |

All 5 WA seats in the House of Representatives 3 seats needed for a majority
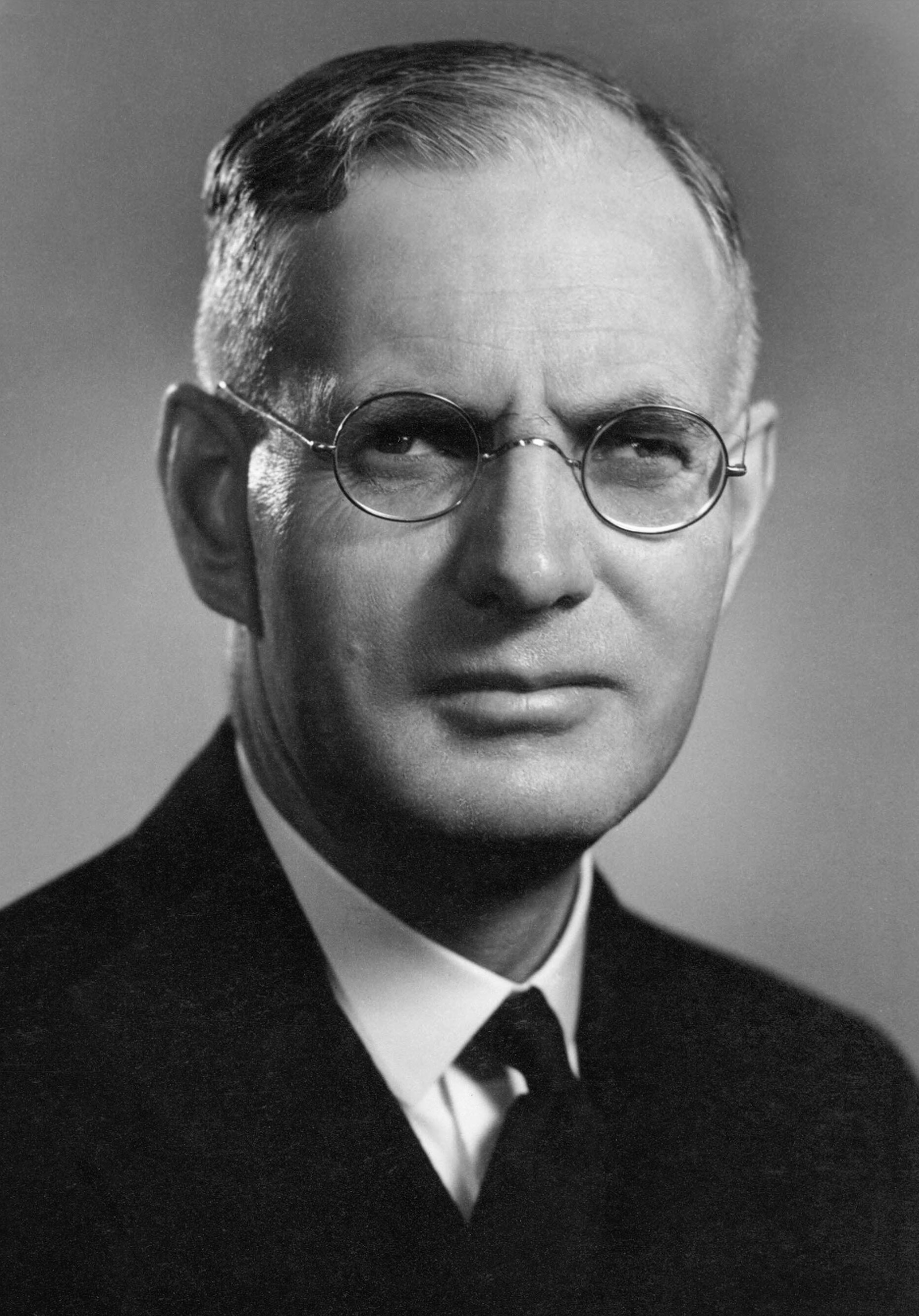

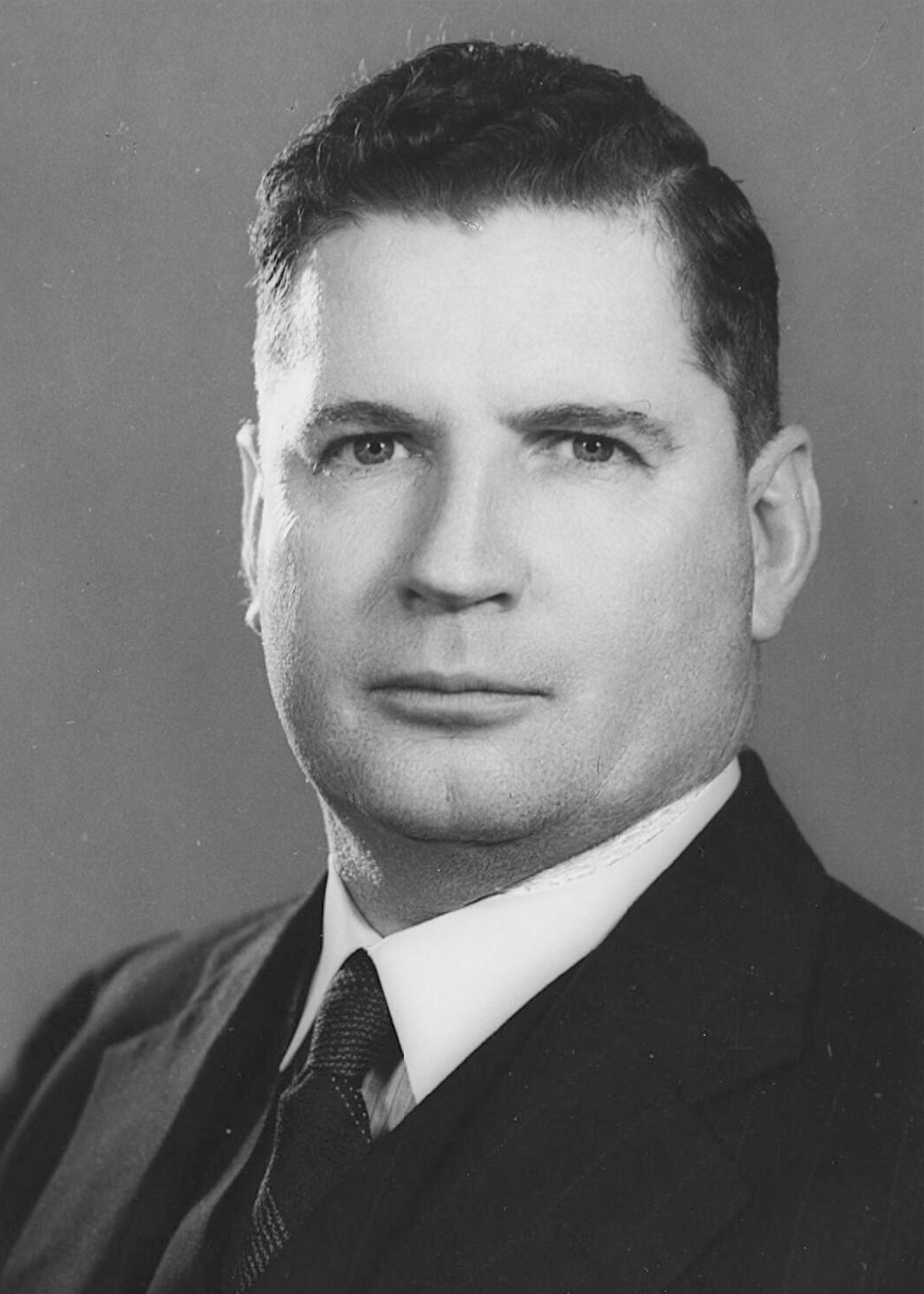
| | First party | Second party |
|---|---|---|
| Leader | John Curtin | Arthur Fadden |
| Party | Labor | Coalition |
| Seats before | 2 | 3 |
| Seats won | 5 | 0 |
| Seat change | ▲3 | ▼3 |
| Popular vote | 143,773 | 54,772 |
| Percentage | 56.0% | 21.1% |
| Swing | ▲17.8pp | ▼33.1pp |

=== Forrest ===
1943 Australian federal election: Forrest
| Party | Candidate | Votes | % | ±% |
|---|---|---|---|---|
| Labor | Nelson Lemmon | 23,931 | 52.9 | +8.3 |
| Country | John Prowse | 15,507 | 34.3 | −21.1 |
| Independent | Ian Fergusson-Stewart | 3,264 | 7.2 | +7.2 |
| Independent Country | Arthur West | 2,156 | 4.8 | +4.8 |
| Independent | Wildred Lewis | 377 | 0.8 | +0.8 |
| Total formal votes | | 45,235 | 97.1 | |
| Informal votes | | 1,343 | 2.9 | |
| Turnout | | 46,578 | 97.5 | |
Two-party-preferred result
| Labor | Nelson Lemmon | | 58.4 | +13.8 |
| Country | John Prowse | | 42.6 | −13.8 |
| Labor gain from Country | | Swing | +13.8 | |

=== Fremantle ===
1943 Australian federal election: Fremantle
| Party | Candidate | Votes | % | ±% |
|---|---|---|---|---|
| Labor | John Curtin | 45,352 | 66.9 | +18.9 |
| Ind. Nationalist | Frederick Lee | 13,046 | 19.2 | +19.2 |
| United Australia | Alex Bracks | 9,396 | 13.9 | −32.3 |
| Total formal votes | | 67,794 | 98.2 | |
| Informal votes | | 1,226 | 1.8 | |
| Turnout | | 69,020 | 99.1 | |
Two-party-preferred result
| Labor | John Curtin | | 69.3 | +19.0 |
| Ind. Nationalist | Frederick Lee | | 30.7 | +30.7 |
| Labor hold | | Swing | +19.0 | |

=== Kalgoorlie ===
1943 Australian federal election: Kalgoorlie
| Party | Candidate | Votes | % | ±% |
|---|---|---|---|---|
| Labor | Herbert Johnson | 23,424 | 67.6 | −32.4 |
| United Australia | Lance Horley | 6,227 | 18.0 | +18.0 |
| Communist | Kevin Healy | 3,002 | 8.7 | +8.7 |
| United Australia | Ralph Shaw | 1,538 | 4.4 | +4.4 |
| Independent | William McGhie | 463 | 1.3 | +1.3 |
| Total formal votes | | 34,654 | 96.9 | |
| Informal votes | | 1,092 | 3.1 | |
| Turnout | | 35,746 | 95.5 | |
Two-party-preferred result
| Labor | Herbert Johnson | | 75.4 | −24.6 |
| United Australia | Lance Horley | | 24.6 | +24.6 |
| Labor hold | | Swing | −24.6 | |

=== Perth ===
1943 Australian federal election: Perth
| Party | Candidate | Votes | % | ±% |
|---|---|---|---|---|
| Labor | Tom Burke | 25,376 | 42.3 | +10.8 |
| United Australia | Walter Nairn | 17,610 | 29.4 | −33.0 |
| Independent | Thomas Hughes | 8,112 | 13.5 | +13.5 |
| Communist | Clarrie Boyd | 3,639 | 6.1 | +6.1 |
| Independent | Stephenson Fox | 2,611 | 4.4 | +4.4 |
| Independent | Robert Nicholson | 1,501 | 2.5 | +2.5 |
| Independent | Dorothea Foster | 495 | 0.8 | +0.8 |
| Independent | William Herbert | 419 | 0.7 | +0.7 |
| Independent | Thomas Groves | 169 | 0.3 | +0.3 |
| Total formal votes | | 59,932 | 93.3 | |
| Informal votes | | 4,311 | 6.7 | |
| Turnout | | 64,243 | 99.0 | |
Two-party-preferred result
| Labor | Tom Burke | 33,581 | 56.0 | +20.5 |
| United Australia | Walter Nairn | 26,351 | 44.0 | −20.5 |
| Labor gain from United Australia | | Swing | +20.5 | |

=== Swan ===
1943 Australian federal election: Swan
| Party | Candidate | Votes | % | ±% |
|---|---|---|---|---|
| Labor | Don Mountjoy | 25,690 | 50.1 | +21.9 |
| Country | Thomas Marwick | 18,124 | 35.3 | −17.7 |
| Country | Cecil Elsegood | 5,632 | 11.0 | +11.0 |
| Independent | John Tregenza | 1,859 | 3.6 | +3.6 |
| Total formal votes | | 51,305 | 97.4 | |
| Informal votes | | 1,369 | 2.6 | |
| Turnout | | 52,674 | 94.8 | |
Two-party-preferred result
| Labor | Don Mountjoy | | 53.0 | +10.5 |
| Country | Thomas Marwick | | 47.0 | −10.5 |
| Labor gain from Country | | Swing | +10.5 | |

== Tasmania ==
1943 Australian federal election (Tasmania)
| ← 1940 | 21 August 1943 | 1946 → |

All 5 Tasmanian seats in the House of Representatives 3 seats needed for a majority
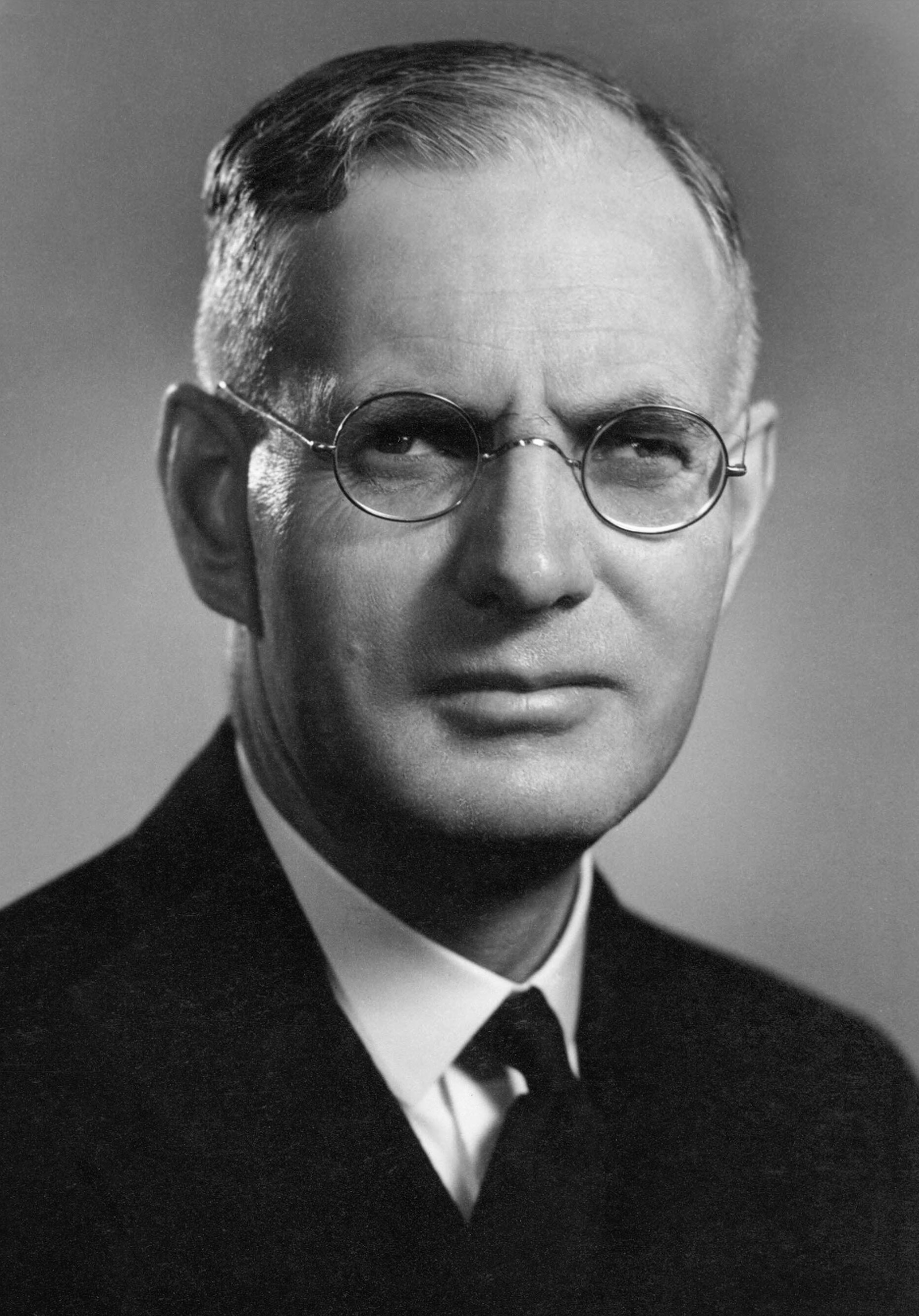

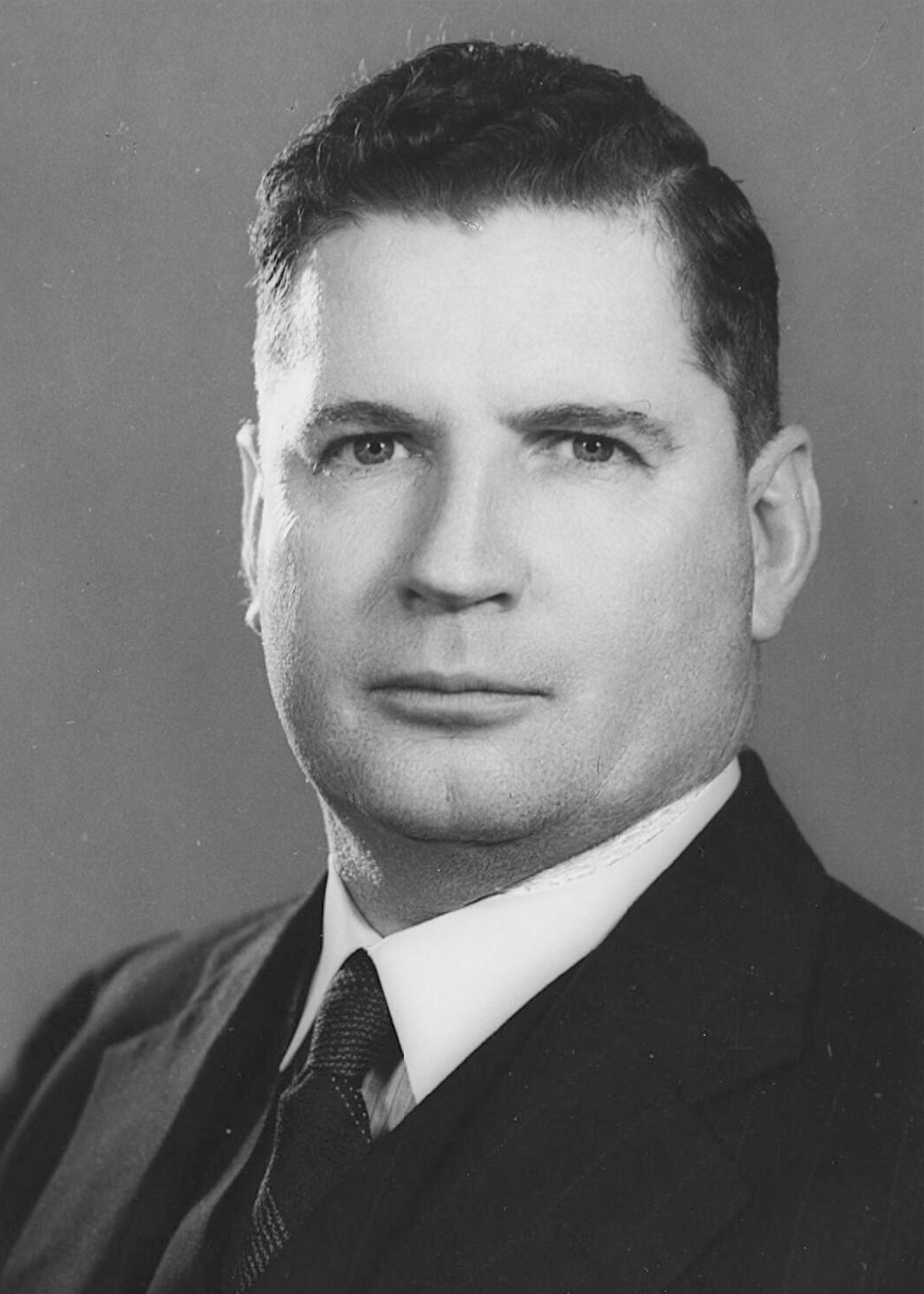
| | First party | Second party |
|---|---|---|
| Leader | John Curtin | Arthur Fadden |
| Party | Labor | Coalition |
| Seats before | 2 | 3 |
| Seats won | 3 | 2 |
| Seat change | ▲1 | ▼1 |
| Popular vote | 66,168 | 55,172 |
| Percentage | 49.3% | 41.1% |
| Swing | ▲10.5pp | ▼2.1pp |
| TPP | 54.8% | 45.2% |

=== Bass ===
1943 Australian federal election: Bass
| Party | Candidate | Votes | % | ±% |
|---|---|---|---|---|
| Labor | Claude Barnard | 13,136 | 51.2 | +1.8 |
| United Australia | Desmond Oldham | 7,085 | 27.6 | −17.1 |
| Independent | John Orchard | 4,509 | 17.6 | +17.6 |
| Independent | John Watson | 469 | 1.8 | −4.2 |
| Independent | Harold Harwood | 440 | 1.7 | +1.7 |
| Total formal votes | | 25,639 | 96.1 | |
| Informal votes | | 1,039 | 3.9 | |
| Turnout | | 26,678 | 98.4 | |
Two-party-preferred result
| Labor | Claude Barnard | 14,691 | 57.3 | +3.1 |
| United Australia | Desmond Oldham | 10,947 | 42.7 | −3.1 |
| Labor hold | | Swing | +3.1 | |

=== Darwin ===
1943 Australian federal election: Darwin
| Party | Candidate | Votes | % | ±% |
|---|---|---|---|---|
| Labor | Eric Reece | 7,799 | 28.6 | +1.6 |
| United Australia | Dame Enid Lyons | 7,349 | 26.9 | −10.3 |
| Labor | Carrol Bramich | 3,832 | 14.0 | +14.0 |
| United Australia | John Leary | 3,104 | 11.4 | +11.4 |
| United Australia | John Wright | 2,885 | 10.6 | +10.6 |
| Independent Labor | Edgar Nicholls | 1,709 | 6.3 | +6.3 |
| Communist | Roy Harvey | 616 | 2.3 | +2.3 |
| Total formal votes | | 27,294 | 95.3 | |
| Informal votes | | 1,355 | 4.7 | |
| Turnout | | 28,649 | 96.0 | |
Two-party-preferred result
| United Australia | Dame Enid Lyons | 14,055 | 51.5 | −7.7 |
| Labor | Eric Reece | 13,239 | 48.5 | +7.7 |
| United Australia hold | | Swing | −7.7 | |

=== Denison ===
1943 Australian federal election: Denison
| Party | Candidate | Votes | % | ±% |
|---|---|---|---|---|
| Labor | Frank Gaha | 13,208 | 47.3 | −1.6 |
| United Australia | Arthur Beck | 10,803 | 38.7 | −12.4 |
| Independent Labor | Gerald Mahoney | 3,120 | 11.2 | +11.2 |
| Communist | George Walliss | 773 | 2.8 | +2.8 |
| Total formal votes | | 27,904 | 96.2 | |
| Informal votes | | 1,094 | 3.8 | |
| Turnout | | 28,998 | 98.4 | |
Two-party-preferred result
| Labor | Frank Gaha | 16,493 | 59.0 | +10.1 |
| United Australia | Arthur Beck | 11,411 | 40.9 | −10.1 |
| Labor gain from United Australia | | Swing | +10.1 | |

=== Franklin ===
1943 Australian federal election: Franklin
| Party | Candidate | Votes | % | ±% |
|---|---|---|---|---|
| Labor | Charles Frost | 17,195 | 58.9 | +5.4 |
| United Australia | Denis Warner | 9,101 | 31.2 | −5.4 |
| United Australia | Charles Tennant | 2,903 | 9.9 | +9.9 |
| Total formal votes | | 29,199 | 97.7 | |
| Informal votes | | 831 | 2.8 | |
| Turnout | | 30,030 | 96.2 | |
Two-party-preferred result
| Labor | Charles Frost | 17,490 | 59.9 | +6.4 |
| United Australia | Denis Warner | 11,708 | 40.1 | −6.4 |
| Labor hold | | Swing | +6.4 | |

=== Wilmot ===
1943 Australian federal election: Wilmot
| Party | Candidate | Votes | % | ±% |
|---|---|---|---|---|
| United Australia | Allan Guy | 19,417 | 49.6 | −7.5 |
| Labor | Ern Pinkard | 10,994 | 45.6 | +2.2 |
| Independent | John McGeary | 1,259 | 5.2 | +5.2 |
| Total formal votes | | 24,105 | 97.4 | |
| Informal votes | | 656 | 2.6 | |
| Turnout | | 24,761 | 96.0 | |
Two-party-preferred result
| United Australia | Allan Guy | 12,463 | 51.7 | −3.3 |
| Labor | Ernest Pinkard | 11,642 | 48.3 | +3.3 |
| United Australia hold | | Swing | −3.3 | |

== Northern Territory ==
=== Northern Territory ===
1943 Australian federal election: Northern Territory
| Party | Candidate | Votes | % | ±% |
|---|---|---|---|---|
| Independent | Adair Blain | 859 | 35.5 | −3.4 |
| Independent Labor | Bob Murray | 682 | 28.2 | −3.4 |
| Independent Labor | Jock Nelson | 602 | 24.9 | +24.9 |
| Independent | Sydney Barker | 99 | 4.1 | +4.1 |
| Independent | Hector Fuller | 99 | 4.1 | +4.1 |
| Independent | Alexander Grant | 43 | 1.8 | +1.8 |
| One Parliament | Harry Russell | 36 | 1.5 | +1.5 |
| Total formal votes | | 2,420 | 97.7 | |
| Informal votes | | 58 | 2.3 | |
| Turnout | | 2,478 | 59.1 | |
Two-party-preferred result
| Independent | Adair Blain | 1,274 | 52.6 | −9.2 |
| Independent Labor | Bob Murray | 1,146 | 47.4 | +9.2 |
| Independent hold | | Swing | −9.6 | |

== See also ==
- Candidates of the 1943 Australian federal election
- Members of the Australian House of Representatives, 1943–1946
