= Candidates of the 1943 Australian federal election =

This article provides information on candidates who stood for the 1943 Australian federal election. The election was held on 21 August 1943.

In 1941, the Lang Labor supporters had rejoined the Australian Labor Party. Their seats are still designated as Lang Labor seats.

== By-elections, appointments and defections ==
=== By-elections and appointments ===
- On 16 November 1940, Herbert Johnson (Labor) was elected to replace Albert Green (Labor) as the member for Kalgoorlie.
- On 21 December 1940, Thomas Marwick (Country) was elected to replace Henry Gregory (Country) as the member for Swan.
- On 24 May 1941, Grenfell Price (UAP) was elected to replace John Price (UAP) as the member for Boothby.
- On 8 October 1942, Charles Latham (Country) was appointed a Western Australian Senator to replace Bertie Johnston (Country).

=== Defections ===
- In 1941, Labor MP Maurice Blackburn (Bourke) was expelled from the Labor Party and subsequently sat as an independent.
- In 1941, the Australian Labor Party (Non-Communist) was reabsorbed into the federal Labor Party. Non-Communist members Senator Stan Amour (New South Wales), Senator John Armstrong (New South Wales), Jack Beasley (West Sydney), Dan Mulcahy (Lang), Sol Rosevear (Dalley) and Tom Sheehan (Cook) were all readmitted to the ALP.
- In 1943, Country Party MP Thomas Marwick (Swan) left the party to sit as an independent.
- In 1943, Labor Senator Tom Arthur lost his place on the Labor ticket. He contested the election as an independent.

== Retiring Members and Senators ==
=== United Australia ===
- Sir George Bell MP (Darwin, Tas)
- Senator Alexander McLachlan (SA)

=== Country ===
- Thomas Paterson MP (Gippsland, Vic)

== House of Representatives ==
Sitting members at the time of the election are shown in bold text. Successful candidates are highlighted in the relevant colour. Where there is possible confusion, an asterisk (*) is also used.

=== New South Wales ===
Electorate	Held by	Labor candidate	Coalition candidate	OPA candidate	LDP candidate	Other candidates
Barton	Labor	**H. V. Evatt**	Frank Browne (UAP)			Thomas Claydon (PPP)
Calare	Labor	**John Breen**	Reg Edols (CP); Albert Reid (CP)	Percy Phelan		Harold Thorby (Ind)
Cook	Labor (N-C)	**Tom Sheehan**		Albert Jones		Sid Conway (SL); Cyril Glassop (PL)
Cowper	Country	John Howard	**Sir Earle Page** (CP)	Alexander Moore		Joseph McElhone (Ind)
Dalley	Labor (N-C)	**Sol Rosevear**		Ernest de Faria		Lance Sharkey (CPA)
Darling	Labor	**Joe Clark**		James Butler		
East Sydney	Labor	**Eddie Ward**	Vincent Brady (UAP)	Ernest Carr	Hugh Angrave	Arthur Shirley (Ind)
Eden-Monaro	United Australia	Allan Fraser	**John Perkins** (UAP)		Denzil Macarthur-Onslow	Bill Beale (Ind); Jonas Crabtree (Ind); John Egan (Ind); Cecil Gray (Ind)
Gwydir	Labor	**William Scully**	Colin Gale (CP)	William Mills		Edmund Daniel (Ind)
Hume	Country	Arthur Fuller	**Thomas Collins** (CP)		John Neeld	Vernon Lawrence (Ind); John McLeod (CPA)
Hunter	Labor	**Rowley James**				
Lang	Labor (N-C)	**Dan Mulcahy**	William Harris (UAP)			John Metcalfe (Ind); Henry Mulcahy (Ind); Adam Ogston (CPA)
Macquarie	Labor	**Ben Chifley**	Arthur Hebblewhite (UAP)	Albert Walker		Millie Sullivan (Ind CP)
Martin	United Australia	Fred Daly	**William McCall** (UAP)		George Mills	Gerrard Armstrong (Ind); Edward Beck (Ind); Eleanor Glencross (Ind); John Lee (Ind); William Milne (Ind Nat); Rupert Nicholson (Ind UAP); Albert Sloss (SL); Isabella Stenning (Ind)
New England	Country	Herbert Oxford	**Joe Abbott** (CP)	James Fowler		Charles Abbott (Ind); Albert Royal (Ind)
Newcastle	Labor	**David Watkins**				James Bayley (Ind); John Cain (Ind Lab); Stan Deacon (CPA); Fred Wright (Ind Lab)
North Sydney	United Australia	Leo Haylen	**Billy Hughes** (UAP)	Jack Lewis		Eric Bentley (Ind); Jack Miles (CPA); Oliver Partington (Ind); Patrick Williams (Ind)
Parkes	United Australia	Les Haylen	**Sir Charles Marr** (UAP)	Arthur Miles	Nigel Love	Pauline Budge (AWP); Arthur Thompson (Ind); Francis Wilson (Ind)
Parramatta	United Australia	Arthur Treble	**Sir Frederick Stewart** (UAP)		Ormond Bissett	Robert Firebrace (NU); Howard Miscamble (Ind UAP); Dexter Moore (Ind)
Reid	Labor	**Charles Morgan**	David Knox (UAP)	Alfred Turner		Dick George (Ind UAP); Jack Hughes (SL); Jack Lang (LL)
Richmond	Country	Arthur Dodd	**Larry Anthony** (CP)	Alfred Anderson		
Riverina	Labor	**Joe Langtry**	Lindsay McIvor (CP); Russell Scilley (CP)		George Simons	Robert Ballantyne (Ind); Robert McKenzie (Ind); Frank Rieck (Ind)
Robertson	United Australia	Thomas Williams	**Eric Spooner** (UAP)	Donald Brown		Walter Evans (SL); Roberta Galagher (Ind)
Warringah	United Australia	Ronald Ashworth	**Percy Spender** (UAP)	Douglas Morris		Edward Doherty (Ind MCP); Gerald Robinson (Ind); Stephen Stack (Ind)
Watson	Labor	**Max Falstein**	Norman Whitfield (UAP)		Arthur Dudley	Les Fingleton (Ind UAP); Hubert O'Connell (Ind UAP); Richard Wilson (SL); Harry Yates (Ind)
Wentworth	United Australia	Jessie Street	**Eric Harrison** (UAP)		Charles Mayo	Bill Wentworth (Nat Gov); Thomas Whitehouse (Ind)
Werriwa	Labor	**Bert Lazzarini**		Arthur Brown		Michel Kartzoff (Ind)
West Sydney	Labor (N-C)	**Jack Beasley**		Eddington Sherwood		Horace Foley (SL); Malinda Ivey (Ind); William McCristal (SCWW)

=== Northern Territory ===
Electorate	Held by	Candidates
Northern Territory	Independent	Sydney Barker (Ind); **Adair Blain*** (Ind); Hector Fuller (Ind); Alexander Grant (Ind); Bob Murray (Ind Lab); Jock Nelson (Ind Lab); Harry Russell (OPA)

=== Queensland ===
Electorate	Held by	Labor candidate	Coalition candidate	OPA candidate	Other candidates
Brisbane	Labor	**George Lawson**	John Fletcher (UAP)	Robert Boardman	Bruce Pie (Ind)
Capricornia	Labor	**Frank Forde**	Charles Ward (UAP)		
Darling Downs	Country	Leslie Bailey	**Arthur Fadden** (CP)	Hugh Phair	Raymond Mullaly (Ind)
Griffith	Labor	**William Conelan**	Richard Larking (UAP)	John Carbine	Theophilus Dunstone (Ind); William Kingwell (Ind)
Herbert	Labor	**George Martens**	Archie Graham (CP)		Charles Cook (Ind); Fred Paterson (CPA)
Kennedy	Labor	**Bill Riordan**	Wilfrid Simmonds (CP)		Athena Deane (Ind); Richard Vane-Millbank (Ind)
Lilley	United Australia	Jim Hadley	**William Jolly** (UAP)	Hans Beiers	James Julin (Ind)
Maranoa	Labor	**Frank Baker**	Charles Adermann (CP)		
Moreton	United Australia	Patrick McInally	John Cantwell (CP); **Josiah Francis*** (UAP)	Ralph Belcham	
Wide Bay	Country	George Watson	**Bernard Corser*** (CP); James Heading (CP)		Clive Lambourne (Ind); Henry Madden (Ind)

=== South Australia ===
Electorate	Held by	Labor candidate	UAP candidate	Other candidates
Adelaide	United Australia	Cyril Chambers	**Fred Stacey**	Alf Watt (CPA); George Edwin Yates (Ind Lab)
Barker	United Australia	Harry Krantz	**Archie Cameron**	John Gartner (Ind); Frank Halleday (Ind)
Boothby	United Australia	Thomas Sheehy	**Grenfell Price**	Alan Finger (CPA); John Turner (CD)
Grey	Country	Edgar Russell		**Oliver Badman** (CP)
Hindmarsh	Labor	**Norman Makin**	James Butler	
Wakefield	United Australia	Albert Smith	**Jack Duncan-Hughes**	

=== Tasmania ===
Electorate	Held by	Labor candidate	UAP candidate	Other candidates
Bass	Labor	**Claude Barnard**	Desmond Oldham	Harold Harwood (Ind); John Orchard (Ind); John Watson (Ind)
Darwin	United Australia	Carrol Bramich; Eric Reece	John Leary; Dame Enid Lyons*; John Wright	Roy Harvey (CPA); Edgar Nicholls (Ind Lab)
Denison	United Australia	Frank Gaha	**Arthur Beck**	Gerald Mahoney (Ind Lab); George Walliss (CPA)
Franklin	Labor	**Charles Frost**	Charles Tennant; Denis Warner	
Wilmot	United Australia	Ern Pinkard	**Allan Guy**	John McGeary (Ind)

=== Victoria ===
Electorate	Held by	Labor candidate	Coalition candidate	Other candidates
Balaclava	United Australia	John Barry	**Thomas White** (UAP)	Frank Barnes (Ind); Constance Duncan (Ind); Helen Maxwell (Prog); George Morris (Ind)
Ballaarat	Labor	**Reg Pollard**	Bill Roff (UAP)	Gordon Irish (Chr Ind)
Batman	Labor	**Frank Brennan**	Arthur McAdam (UAP)	Joseph Cahir (Ind); Gordon Currie (SP); Christina Debney (Ind); Ian Malloch (SCP)
Bendigo	Country	Bert de Grandi	**George Rankin** (CP)	William Banks (Ind Lab); John Crawford (Ind); Morton Garner (Ind UAP)
Bourke	Labor	Bill Bryson	David Smith (UAP)	**Maurice Blackburn** (Ind Lab); John March (Ind)
Corangamite	United Australia	Harold Miller	**Allan McDonald** (UAP)	Elsie Brushfield (Ind); Sydney Donaldson (Ind CP)
Corio	Labor	**John Dedman**	Rupert Curnow (UAP)	James Baker (Prog); Neil Freeman (Ind)
Deakin	United Australia	Frank Williamson	**William Hutchinson** (UAP)	Alan Coffey (MCP); Arthur Coles (Ind); Robert Elliott (Ind); Dick Radclyffe (Ind UAP)
Fawkner	United Australia	Thomas Jude	**Harold Holt** (UAP)	William Cremor (Ind); Malcolm Good (CPA); Charles Kennett (Ind); Vernon Margetts (Ind); Ruth Ravenscroft (Ind)
Flinders	United Australia	Frank Lee	Morton Moyes (CP); **Rupert Ryan*** (UAP)	Mabel Brookes (AWP); Rupert Clark (Ind)
Gippsland	Country	Wally Williames	George Bowden (CP)	Stephen Ashton (Ind Dem); Herbert Birch (SCP); Mervyn Morgan (OPA)
Henty	Independent		Jo Gullett (UAP)	**Arthur Coles*** (Ind); Carlyle Ferguson (Ind Lib); Edmund Lind (SCP); Bernard Rees (Ind Lab); Ivy Weber (WFCM)
Indi	Country	Charles Sandford	**John McEwen** (CP)	Gerry O'Day (CPA)
Kooyong	United Australia	Albert Nicholls	**Robert Menzies** (UAP)	Ted Laurie (CPA); John Nimmo (MCP); Gwendolyn Noad (Chr Ind)
Maribyrnong	Labor	**Arthur Drakeford**	Albert Pennell (UAP)	Kenneth Kenafick (Ind Lab); Charles Woollacott (CCM)
Melbourne	Labor	**Arthur Calwell**	Elizabeth Couchman (UAP)	Louis Bickart (MCP); Charles Dicker (Ind); Noble Kerby (SP); Ken Miller (CPA)
Melbourne Ports	Labor	**Jack Holloway**	Frank Preacher (UAP)	
Wannon	Labor	**Don McLeod**	John Menadue (UAP); Leonard Rodda (CP)	Thomas Scholfield (Ind UAP)
Wimmera	Independent			Herbert Follett (Ind); Eric Phillips (Ind CP); Reginald Skeat (Ind CP); Albert Thompson (Ind CP); **Alexander Wilson*** (Ind)
Yarra	Labor	**James Scullin**	Gilbert Jenkin (UAP)	Ralph Gibson (CPA); William Jinkins (SCP); Allan MacDonald (Ind)

=== Western Australia ===
Electorate	Held by	Labor candidate	Coalition candidate	Other candidates
Forrest	Country	Nelson Lemmon	**John Prowse** (CP)	Ian Fergusson-Stewart (Ind); Wilfred Lewis (Ind); Arthur West (Ind CP)
Fremantle	Labor	**John Curtin**	Alex Bracks (UAP)	Frederick Lee (Ind Nat)
Kalgoorlie	Labor	**Herbert Johnson**	Lance Horley (UAP); Ralph Shaw (UAP)	Kevin Healy (CPA); William McGhie (Ind)
Perth	United Australia	Tom Burke	**Walter Nairn** (UAP)	Clarrie Boyd (CPA); Dorothea Foster (Ind); Stephenson Fox (Ind); Thomas Groves (Ind); William Herbert (Ind); Thomas Hughes (Ind); Robert Nicholson (Ind)
Swan	Country	Don Mountjoy	Cecil Elsegood (CP); **Thomas Marwick** (CP)	John Tregenza (Ind)

== Senate ==
Sitting Senators are shown in bold text. Tickets that elected at least one Senator are highlighted in the relevant colour. Successful candidates are identified by an asterisk (*).

=== New South Wales ===
Three seats were up for election. The Labor Party was defending three seats. Labor Senators James Arnold, Bill Ashley and William Large were not up for re-election.

Labor candidates	Coalition candidates	OPA candidates	CNOM candidates	Ungrouped candidates
1. **Stan Amour***; 2. **John Armstrong***; 3. Donald Grant*	1. Guy Arkins (UAP); 2. Dick Dein (UAP); 3. Horace Nock (CP)	1. Harold Sterling; 2. William O'Sullivan; 3. Sylvan Deloraine	1. Peter Pollack; 2. Julius Burnham; 3. George Southern	Ada Beveridge (Ind); Francis Walter (Ind); Gilbert Leitch (Ind); Valdemar Olling (Ind); **Tom Arthur** (Ind); Claude Sugden (Ind Lab); Edith Cook (Ind)

=== Queensland ===
Three seats were up for election. The Labor Party was defending three seats. United Australia Party Senators Thomas Crawford and Harry Foll and Country Party Senator Walter Cooper were not up for re-election.

Labor candidates	UAP candidates	Country candidates	Ungrouped candidates
1. **Gordon Brown***; 2. **Joe Collings***; 3. **Ben Courtice***	1. Charles Brown; 2. Paul Goldenstedt; 3. James McDonald	1. James Annand; 2. Bob McGeoch; 3. Charles Ware	James Kidman; Walter Hughes

=== South Australia ===
Three seats were up for election. The United Australia Party was defending three seats. United Australia Party Senators James McLachlan, George McLeay and Oliver Uppill were not up for re-election.

Labor candidates	UAP candidates
1. Sid O'Flaherty*; 2. Theo Nicholls*; 3. Alex Finlay*	1. **Philip McBride**; 2. **Keith Wilson**; 3. Ted Mattner

=== Tasmania ===
Three seats were up for election. The Labor Party was defending three seats. United Australia Party Senators John Hayes, Herbert Hays and Burford Sampson were not up for re-election.

Labor candidates	UAP candidates
1. **Bill Aylett***; 2. **Charles Lamp***; 3. Nick McKenna*; 4. **Richard Darcey**; 5. George Carruthers	1. Bayard Edgell; 2. Algie Findlay; 3. Peregrine Andrews; 4. Darrel Tait; 5. Bruce Hamilton; 6. Frank Edwards

=== Victoria ===
Three seats were up for election. The Labor Party was defending two seats. The United Australia Party was defending one seat. United Australia Party Senators Charles Brand and John Leckie and Country Party Senator William Gibson were not up for re-election.

Labor candidates	Coalition candidates	Monetary Reform candidates	Ungrouped candidates
1. **Don Cameron***; 2. **Richard Keane***; 3. Jim Sheehan*	1. Sir Frank Beaurepaire (UAP); 2. William Moss (CP); 3. **John Spicer** (UAP)	1. Vera Carr; 2. Alexander Amess; 3. Bartholomew Goulding	John Smith; Rupert Millane; Edith Hardy

=== Western Australia ===
Four seats were up for election. One of these was a short-term vacancy caused by Country Party Senator Bertie Johnston's death; this was filled in the interim by the Country Party's Charles Latham. The Labor Party was defending three seats. The Country Party was defending one seat. United Australia Party Senators Herbert Collett and Allan MacDonald were not up for re-election.

Labor candidates	Coalition candidates	Ungrouped candidates
1. **James Fraser***; 2. **Robert Clothier***; 3. Richard Nash*; 4. Dorothy Tangney*	1. Thomas Louch (UAP); 2. John Teasdale (UAP); 3. Jim Paton (UAP); 4. **Charles Latham** (CP)	Cropper Milligan; Colin Unwin; Claude Swaine

== See also ==
- 1943 Australian federal election
- Members of the Australian House of Representatives, 1940–1943
- Members of the Australian House of Representatives, 1943–1946
- Members of the Australian Senate, 1941–1944
- Members of the Australian Senate, 1944–1947
- List of political parties in Australia
