= Edmund Lind =

Edmund Lind may refer to:

- Edmund Lind (medical officer) (1888–1944), Australian medical officer and soldier
- Edmund George Lind (1829–1909), American architect
