= John Teasdale (wheat farmer) =

Australian wheat farmer and administrator

Sir John Smith Teasdale CBE (28 June 1881 – 2 July 1962) was an Australian wheat farmer and administrator.

Teasdale was born at Alston, Cumbria, England to stonemason James Teasdale and Jane, née Maughan. He worked as a grain merchant before his migration to Western Australia in 1911, where he and a number of his brothers settled to farm in the Bruce Rock area. Although the Teasdales' initial efforts were devastated by a 1914 drought, John connected with the local farming community to canvass ways of improving drought resistance. Becoming more involved in the farming community, Teasdale was an executive member of the Farmers' and Settlers' Association in 1916 and in 1922 helped found the Wheat Pool of Western Australia, touring Great Britain and the United States to gather information on farming methods. He married Luita Christina Waldeck on 22 August 1929 in Perth.

Teasdale, a Country Party member, successfully lobbied for the 1930 Farmers' Debts Adjustment Act; from 1932 to 1940 he was President of the Primary Producers' Association of Western Australia. He proposed a twenty per cent reduction in acreage for wheat producing countries in 1932, but opposed the Wheatgrowers' Union of Western Australia when it attempted to withhold wheat supply until a compulsory national pool was established. In 1933 Teasdale was a founding director of Co-operative Bank Handling Ltd, and in 1939 he was appointed to the Australian Wheat Board (AWB), chairing the 1947 Royal Commission on Wheat Marketing and Stabilisation.

In 1950 he was appointed chairman of the AWB, a position he held until his death. During his chairmanship, Teasdale supported research into new wheat strains but was out-voted when he opposed selling wheat to China on extended credit. Appointed Commander of the Order of the British Empire in 1948 and knighted in 1951, Teasdale died in 1962 at Kew, having moved to Melbourne shortly after his appointment as AWB chairman.
