= One Parliament for Australia =

Defunct Australian political party

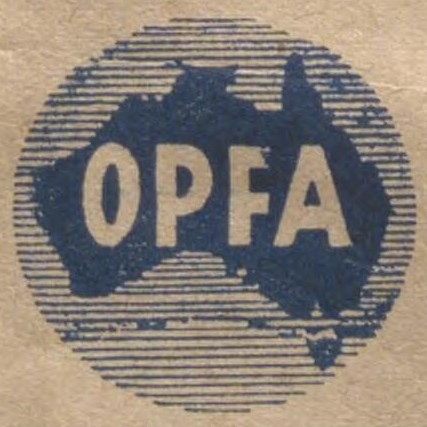
- Founder: Alfred Anderson
- Ideology: Unitarism

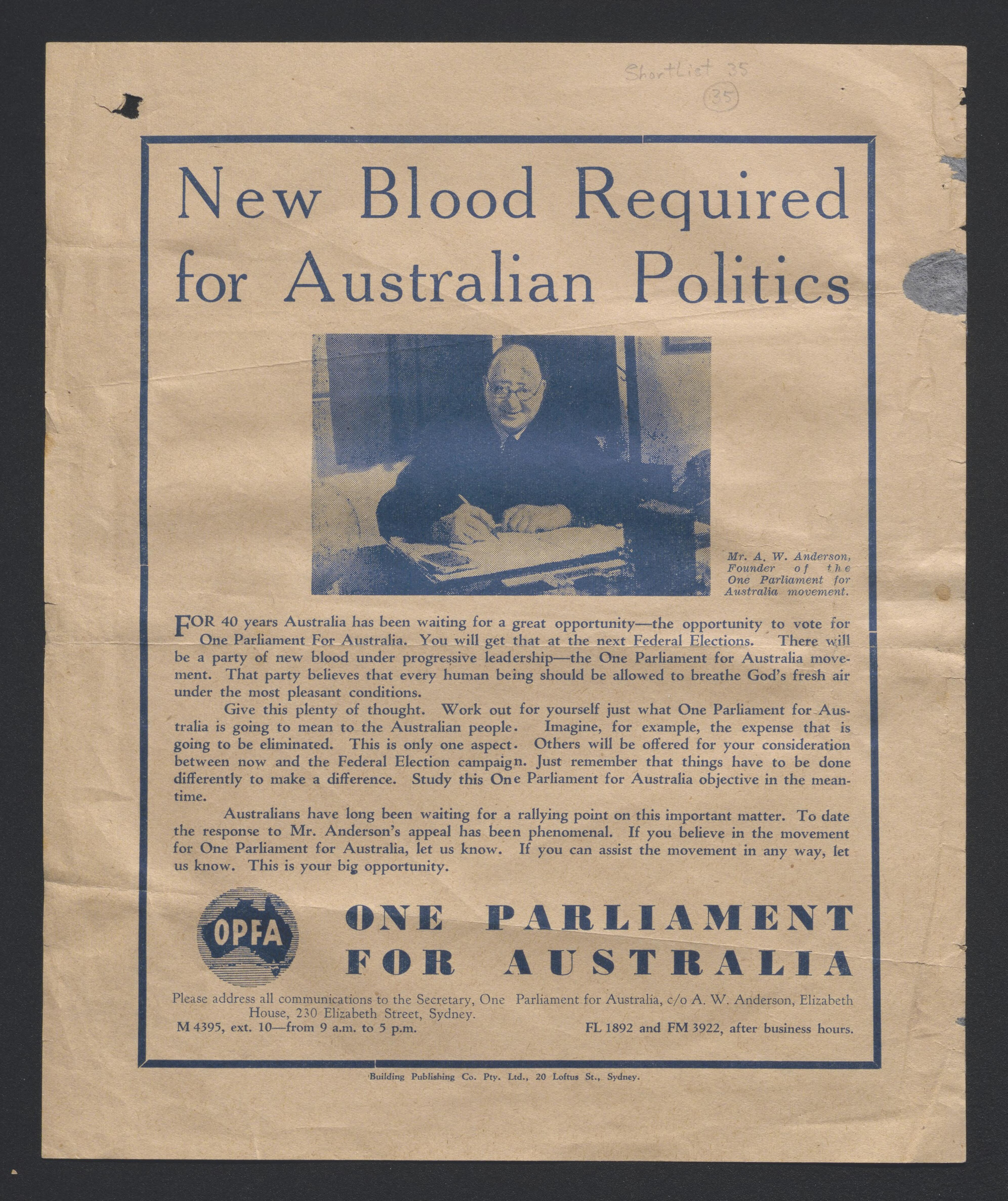
Campaign material used by One Parliament for Australia at the 1943 federal election

One Parliament for Australia was a minor Australian political party that contested the 1943 federal election. It was founded by butcher and company owner Alfred Anderson.

The party wanted to abolish state government.
