= Middle Class Party (Australia) =

Defunct political party in Australia

The Middle Class Party was an Australian political party formed in 1943.

The party was led by Hector Dwyer, and was formed on 8 April 1943 at a meeting of the Australian Bank Officials' Organisation. It claimed to represent Australia's middle class, a claim that would be echoed by Robert Menzies' formation of the Liberal Party of Australia a year later.
