= Nigel Love =

Australian aviator (1892–1979)

Nigel Borland Love
- Born: 16 January 1892; Kurrajong, New South Wales
- Died: 2 October 1979 (aged 87); Killara, New South Wales
- Military career
- Allegiance: Commonwealth of Australia
- Branch: Royal Australian Air Force
- Service years: 1915–1919, 1941–1945
- Rank: Wing Commander
- Unit: No. 3 Squadron (1918)
- Commands: No. 2 Wing, Air Training Corps (1941–1945)
- Conflicts: World War I World War II

Wing Commander Nigel Borland Love (16 January 1892 – 2 October 1979) was an Australian aviator and flour miller.

Love was born at South Kurrajong to businessman John Love and Rebecca, née Charley. He attended Sydney Boys' High School before working in his father's importing business, Plummer Love & Co. He visited Britain 1912–13. In 1915 he enlisted in the Australian Imperial Force and was sent to the government flying school at Richmond. He was commissioned on 11 January 1917 and sent for further training in Britain. In January 1918 he was promoted lieutenant, and served in France with the Australian Flying Corps until June, when he was returned to England as an instructor.

Love returned to Sydney in 1919, and in partnership with W. J. Warneford and H. E. Broadsmith registered the Australian Aircraft and Engineering Co. Ltd., establishing its premises at Mascot. Love, the inaugural managing director, pursued a vigorous publicity campaign and later supplied Qantas with its first commercial aircraft. The market was limited, however, and a lack of government assistance saw the company voluntarily liquidate in 1923. The Commonwealth resumed ownership of their airfield, now Sydney Airport, when the lease expired.

On 4 June 1924 Love married Phyllis Eloise Davey at Strathfield Methodist Church, joining her father's flour mill firm, Edwin Davey & Sons. He registered N. B. Love Pty Ltd and built his own flour mill at Enfield in January 1935. He was also a founding member of the New South Wales Flour Millers' Trade Council in 1942.

In August 1941, Love was appointed wing commander in the Royal Australian Air Force and commanded a wing of the Air Training Corps for boys between 16 and 18. He contested the 1943 federal election unsuccessfully, running as a Liberal Democrat in Parkes. From 1945 to 1946 he was president of the state branch of the Air Force Association.

Love took over Edwin Davey & Sons in 1940, acquiring a Boggabri flour mill in 1944. He established Millmaster Feeds Pty Ltd in 1952 and in 1958 floated N. B. Love Industries Ltd., which was sold to George Weston Limited in 1962, when Love retired to the Canberra region. He died at Killara in 1979 and was cremated.
