= Harry Krantz =

Australian trade union leader

Harry David Krantz OAM (24 November 1919 – 30 March 2006) was an Australian trade union leader. He was Secretary of the South Australian branch of the Federated Clerks' Union (FCU) from 1941 to 1984.

Krantz, whose political views were formed during the Great Depression, became secretary of the Federated Clerks' Union's South Australian branch in 1941, when aged only twenty-one, after the previous incumbent was killed in a bicycle accident. The branch at this time was almost moribund, with only around twenty members. Krantz became known for his advocacy for the union before the Industrial Court and the Industrial Commission, and shortly after his election as secretary the union established the award rate for clerks.

Krantz joined the Australian Imperial Force in 1942 and served with the Royal Australian Engineers throughout the Second World War, leaving the leadership of the FCU to Elizabeth Teesdale-Smith, first female secretary of a South Australian trade union. He took leave from the army in 1943 and 1946 to run as the Labor Party candidate for the seat of Barker against Archie Cameron. In the former contest, he scored a swing of 15 percent and nearly unseated Cameron. To date, this is the last time Labor has come anywhere close to taking what has long been the most conservative seat in South Australia.

After his return from the war, Krantz was associated with the left of the union movement, being ardently opposed to B. A. Santamaria and the "groupers". He retired from the union in 1984, by which time it had more than 6,000 members.

Krantz was also President of the Industrial Relations Society of South Australia (1972–73), chairman of the Remuneration Tribunal, chairman of the South Australian Trotting Control Board, and a board member of the State Government Insurance Commission and the Workers Educational Association. He was awarded the Medal of the Order of Australia in 1981. He died after a brief illness on 30 March 2006.
