= John Vincent Barry =

Australian judge (1903–1969)

Sir John Vincent Barry QC
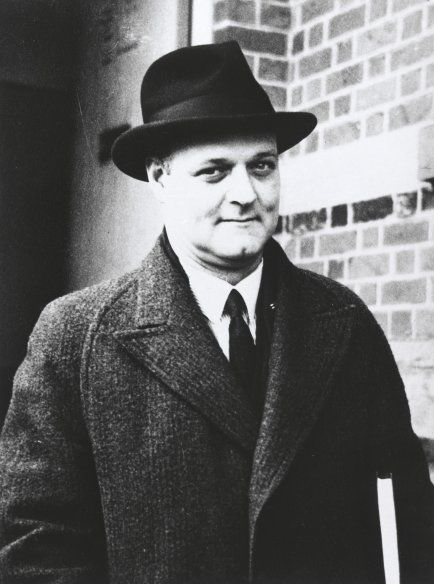

Judge of the Supreme Court of Victoria
- In office 14 January 1947 – 8 November 1969

Personal details
- Born: 13 June 1903 Albury, New South Wales, Australia
- Died: 8 November 1969 (aged 66) Armadale, Victoria, Australia
- Spouses: Ethel Pryor (m. 1930–1943) Nancy Hudson (m. 1951)
- Education: University of Melbourne

Sir John Vincent William Barry QC (13 June 1903 – 8 November 1969) was an Australian justice of the Supreme Court of Victoria, and an expert in criminology.

== Early life ==
Born the eldest child of William Edward Barry and Sarah Lena Jeanette, née Keene in Albury, New South Wales, Barry was educated at St Patrick's College, a small convent school in Goulburn. In 1921, he finished his tertiary education at the University of Melbourne. After being articled to the legal firm, Luke Murphy and Company, in 1921, Barry qualified as a lawyer in 1923, as a result of graduation from the articled clerks' course.

== Legal career ==
On 3 May 1926, Barry was admitted to the Victorian Bar, and began his practice as a barrister. During his time as a barrister, he was known for a jury practice and later, an appellate and High Court practice. After watching a murder trial, in which the accused was convicted and hanged, Barry became opposed to the use of the death penalty. In Mosman, Sydney, on 16 August 1930, Barry married Ethel May Pryor. A foundation vice-president of the Australian Council for Civil Liberties from 1935, Barry became the foundation secretary of the Medico-Legal Society of Victoria.

In 1939, Barry joined the Australian Labor Party and ran, unsuccessfully, for the federal seat of Balaclava in the electoral year of 1943. However, he later became a member of the Victorian central executive in 1945–47, as well as becoming a member of the Overseas Telecommunications Commission in 1946–47. He was also elected chairman of the ethics committee of the Australian Journalists' Association, after becoming a member in 1943. Appointed as a King's Counsel in 1942, Barry assisted Sir Charles Lowe in the inquiry into the Darwin air raids. Representing the politician, Eddie Ward in a royal commission into the Brisbane Line, Barry was appointed commissioner to investigate the suspension of government in Papua New Guinea.

== Judicial career ==
Although failing to be appointed to the High Court despite Arthur Calwell's endorsement in the cabinet, Barry was appointed to the Supreme Court of Victoria on 14 January 1947. Barry became a foundation chairman in the Department of Criminology at the University of Melbourne from 1951, and a member of the Victorian Parole Board from 1957, and was knighted in the 1961 New Year Honours. In 1966, Barry graduated from the University of Melbourne with a Bachelor of Law, after serving nearly 20 years in the Supreme Court. From 1966, until his death in 1969, Barry was the senior Puisne Judge of the Supreme Court. He died of cancer on 8 November 1969 at Armadale, Melbourne and was cremated.

== Writing ==
A prolific writer, Barry wrote many books and articles, most of which concern criminology. One of his well-known biographies, Alexander Maconochie of Norfolk Island, which he wrote in 1958 about penal reformer Alexander Maconochie, was described as "a fascinating tale ... Justice Barry has permeated it with warmth and understanding." Authoring the biography on John Price, The Life and Death of John Price: A Study in the Exercise of Naked Power, Barry was also a contributor to the Australian Law Journal as well as the Australian Dictionary of Biography. A collection of letters he has written prior to his death were published posthumously as The Courts and Criminal Punishments.
