= Kevin Healy =

Kevin Martin Healy (1909–2001) was an Australian communist activist and trade unionist.

== Biography ==
He was born in Fremantle, but at the age of two moved to his parents' native Ireland. He returned to Western Australia in the late 1920s and took up a variety of labouring jobs. During this period he was attracted to radical politics, participating in the 1930 Carnarvon shearers' strike and joining the Communist Party of Australia in 1937. He eventually became chairman of the party's state committee, and in 1949 was charged with sedition, presenting his own defence and winning acquittal. In the early 1950s he moved to New South Wales, where he worked at Mort's Dock. Involved in Aboriginal issues, he founded the Ryde Aboriginal Interest Group in 1992 as part of Ryde Municipal Council's bicentennial.
