= Services and Citizens' Party =

Australian political party

The Services and Citizens' Party was a Victorian political party that was formed in 1943. It was one of the groups that later merged to form the Liberal Party of Australia.

The party was formed to promote the appreciation of service to Australia, and its policies included a unified Australian Army and a National Government during the war. Its candidates for the 1943 election included celebrated Gallipoli veteran Brigadier Edmund Lind, and all of its candidates were required to be servicemen or ex-servicemen. In 1944 it was one of the groups brought together by Robert Menzies to form the Liberal Party of Australia.
