= Constance Duncan =

Australian welfare activist

- Duncan, c. 1922
- Born: Ada Constance Duncan; 26 October 1896; Canterbury Victoria, Australia
- Died: 13 September 1970 (aged 73); Kew Victoria, Australia

Ada Constance Duncan (26 October 1896 – 13 September 1970) was an Australian welfare activist.

Duncan was born at Canterbury to agent Andrew William Bartlett Duncan and Alice Dalby, née Bellin. She attended the local Baptist school, Hessle College, before achieving a Bachelor of Arts (Hons) from the University of Melbourne in 1917, followed by a Master of Arts in 1922. She was one of the first women at the university to own a motorcycle, and offered rides during World War I to raise money for the Australian Red Cross Society. She worked for the Australian Student Christian Movement for two years before being appointed Australian secretary of the Young Women's Christian Association, in which capacity she was sent "on loan" to the Japanese association.

Duncan worked in Tokyo and Kyoto while in Japan and studied at the London School of Economics in the 1928–29 period. She returned home in 1932 due to her father's illness, and joined the Lyceum Club. Secretary of the Victorian branch of the Australian League of Nations Union and the Bureau of Social and International Affairs from 1934 to 1941, she attended the Institute of Pacific Relations conference at Yosemite in California as the Victorian delegate. She returned home via a fact-finding mission for the Australian Broadcasting Commission, investigating short-wave programs in China and Japan.

Duncan then became involved in the peace movement, serving on the executive of the United Peace Council and becoming secretary of the International Peace Campaign in 1937. She resigned after the Munich Agreement (Doris Blackburn was the replacement). In 1938 Duncan was appointed inaugural director of the Victorian International Refugee Emergency Council (VIREC), which assisted European refugees in assimilating into Australian life, and fought against widely held community prejudices. She visited refugees deported from Britain to Australia (the "Dunera boys") at their internment camps and wrote angrily to the British Society of Friends deploring the conditions on the ships, resulting in a summons to Victoria Barracks.

Duncan resigned from the VIREC in December 1941 to join the Department of Labour and National Service, investigating the welfare of children of working mothers. She stood unsuccessfully at the 1943 federal election as an independent for the seat of Balaclava, and in 1944 produced a report for the National Health and Medical Research Council supporting, among other things, family welfare and increased pay for domestic workers.

Duncan visited Korea in 1946 for the United Nations Relief and Rehabilitation Administration in her capacity as welfare officer for the South-West Pacific and liaised with the commanding generals of the United States and Soviet armies before returning to Australia to lecture at universities. She was a foundation member of the International House council (1955–66) and continued her considerable community and church involvement. She died at Kew in 1970 and was cremated; the private dining-room at International House at the University of Melbourne is named for her.
