= Edmund Lind (medical officer) =

Australian Army officer (1888-1944)

Edmund Frank Lind
- Born: 23 December 1888; South Yarra, Victoria
- Died: 2 May 1944 (aged 55); South Yarra, Victoria
- Burial place: Box Hill, Victoria
- Military career
- Allegiance: Australia
- Branch: Australian Army
- Service years: 1910–1942
- Rank: Brigadier
- Unit: 5th Battalion (1914–16)
- Commands: 23rd Infantry Brigade (1940–42); 4th Infantry Brigade (1934–39); 29th/22nd Battalion (1930–34); 29th Battalion (1929–30); Melbourne University Regiment (1921–26); 2nd Field Ambulance (1918–19)
- Conflicts: First World War; Gallipoli Campaign; Western Front; Battle of Fromelles; Battle of Messines; Battle of Broodseinde; Battle of Passchendaele; Battle of Hamel; Second World War; Bombing of Darwin
- Awards: Commander of the Order of the British Empire; Distinguished Service Order; Colonial Auxiliary Forces Officers' Decoration; Mentioned in Despatches (2)

Brigadier Edmund Frank Lind, CBE, DSO, VD (23 December 1888 – 2 May 1944) was an Australian medical practitioner and soldier.

== Early life and First World War ==
Lind was born in South Yarra to bank manager Edmund Frank Lind and Emily Margaret, née Harris, and educated at Camberwell Grammar School. He attended the University of Melbourne and received a Bachelor of Medicine, Bachelor of Surgery in 1914, subsequently practising in Williamstown. On 20 August 1914 he enlisted in the Australian Imperial Force, retaining the rank of captain he had achieved in the Melbourne University Rifles in 1910. He was posted as regimental medical officer to the 5th Battalion, and his criticisms of training conditions in Egypt were heeded. He arrived at Gallipoli on 28 May 1915, having been delayed by a fractured skull from a fall in April.

Following the 5th Battalion's extensive campaign in Turkey, it was sent to Egypt on 11 December. Lind, who transferred to the 8th Field Ambulance on 2 April 1916, was promoted temporary major on 8 June and sailed for France, serving in the Battle of Fromelles before joining the 9th Field Ambulance training in England. He was promoted full major on 14 November. Returning to France on 23 November, Lind was involved in the Battle of Messines in June 1917 as a medical officer and on 22 August was appointed deputy assistant director of medical services (DADMS) for the II ANZAC Corps, serving at Broodseinde and Passchendaele. Appointed DADMS for the 4th Division on 11 January 1918 he served at the Battle of Hamel in July and was promoted temporary lieutenant colonel in September. His AIF appointment was ended in March 1919; he had been awarded the Distinguished Service Order and was twice mentioned in dispatches.

== Interbellum ==
On 23 June 1920 at St Paul's Cathedral in Melbourne, Lind married Beulah Rotterdale McMinn. He practised medicine in Brighton and rejoined the Melbourne University Rifles, which he commanded from 1921 to 1926. In 1926 he became a staff officer on 4th Division Headquarters of the Australian Military Forces, and in 1929 was given command of the 29th and then the 29/22nd Battalions, and in 1934 the 4th Infantry Brigade. Promoted colonel in 1936 and brigadier in 1938, Lind led the Australian Military Contingent to King George VI's coronation in 1937.

== Second World War and later life ==
Lind was appointed Commander of the Order of the British Empire and commander of the 23rd Brigade in July 1940 and deployed to the Northern Territory, where it was dispersed, with one battalion sent to Rabaul, another to Ambon and a third to Dutch Timor. Lind's protestations led him to lose favour with the General Staff, and Lind, instead of commanding the Sparrow Force in Timor, was left to defend 28 miles of coastline near Darwin. Concern at the 1942 air raids and a general replacement of officers led Lind to be removed from command in March and retired in July.

In 1943 Lind was appointed inaugural chairman of the Services and Citizens' Party and ran unsuccessfully for Henty in the 1943 federal election. He died of a heart attack in 1944 at South Yarra and was buried in Box Hill.
