= 1946 Australian House of Representatives election =

This is a list of electoral division results for the Australian 1946 federal election.

== Overall ==
This section is an excerpt from 1946 Australian federal election § House of Representatives

Labor: 43 seats Liberal: 18 seats Country: 11 seats Lang Labor: 1 seat Independent: 1 seat

House of Reps (IRV) — 1946–49—Turnout 93.97% (CV) — Informal 2.45%
Party	Votes	%	Swing	Seats	Change
Labor	2,159,953	49.71	−0.22	43	−6
Liberal–Country coalition	1,896,349	43.65	+13.20	29	+6
Liberal	1,431,682	32.95	+11.05	18	+4
Country	464,667	10.70	+2.16	11	+2
Labor (Non-Communist)	69,138	1.59	+0.87	1	+1
Communist	64,811	1.49	+1.49	0	0
Services	55,140	1.27	+1.27	0	0
Protestant People's	20,111	0.46	+0.46	0	0
Independents	79,040	1.82	−10.34	2 (Note: Including Northern Territory)	-1
Total	4,344,542			75	
Two-party-preferred (estimated)
Labor	Win	54.10	−4.10	43	−6
Liberal–Country coalition		45.90	+4.10	29	+6

Notes

- Independent: Doris Blackburn (Bourke, Vic.)
- In South Australia, the Liberal Party was known as the Liberal and Country League.

Popular vote
Labor	49.71%
Liberal	32.95%
Country	10.70%
Lang Labor	1.59%
Independent/Other	1.83%

Two-party-preferred vote
Labor	54.10%
Coalition	45.90%

Parliament seats
Labor	58.11%
Coalition	35.14%

== New South Wales ==
1946 Australian federal election (New South Wales)
← 1943	28 September 1946	1949 →

All 28 NSW seats in the House of Representatives 14 seats needed for a majority
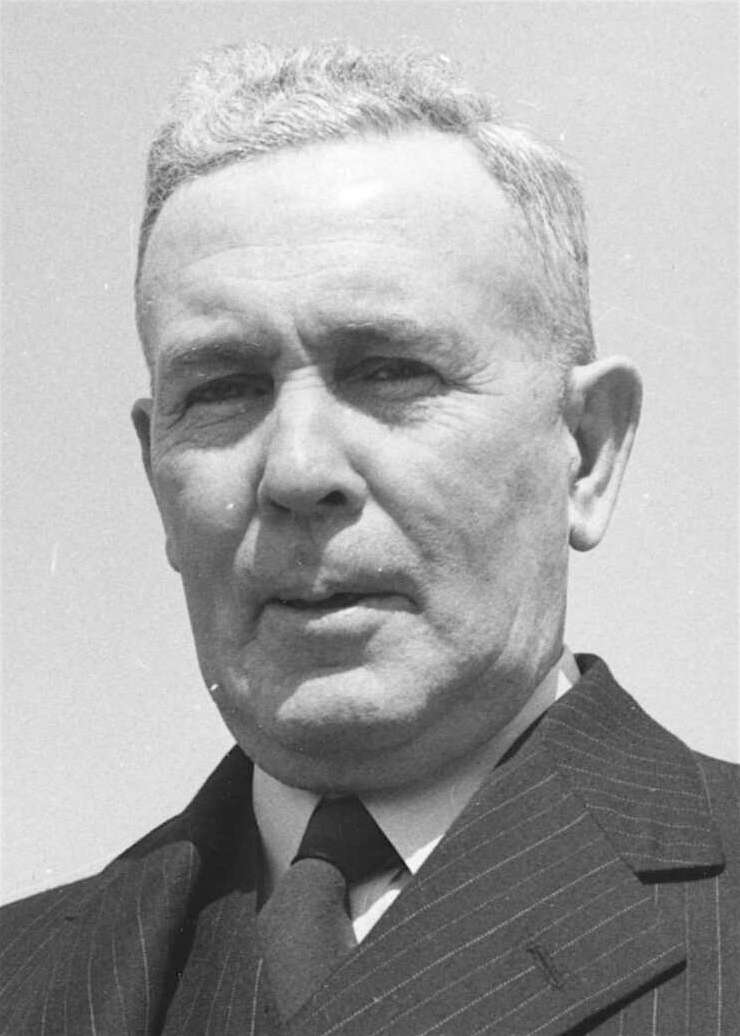

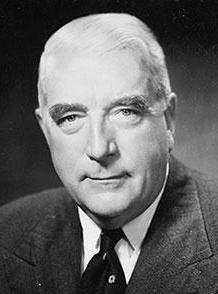

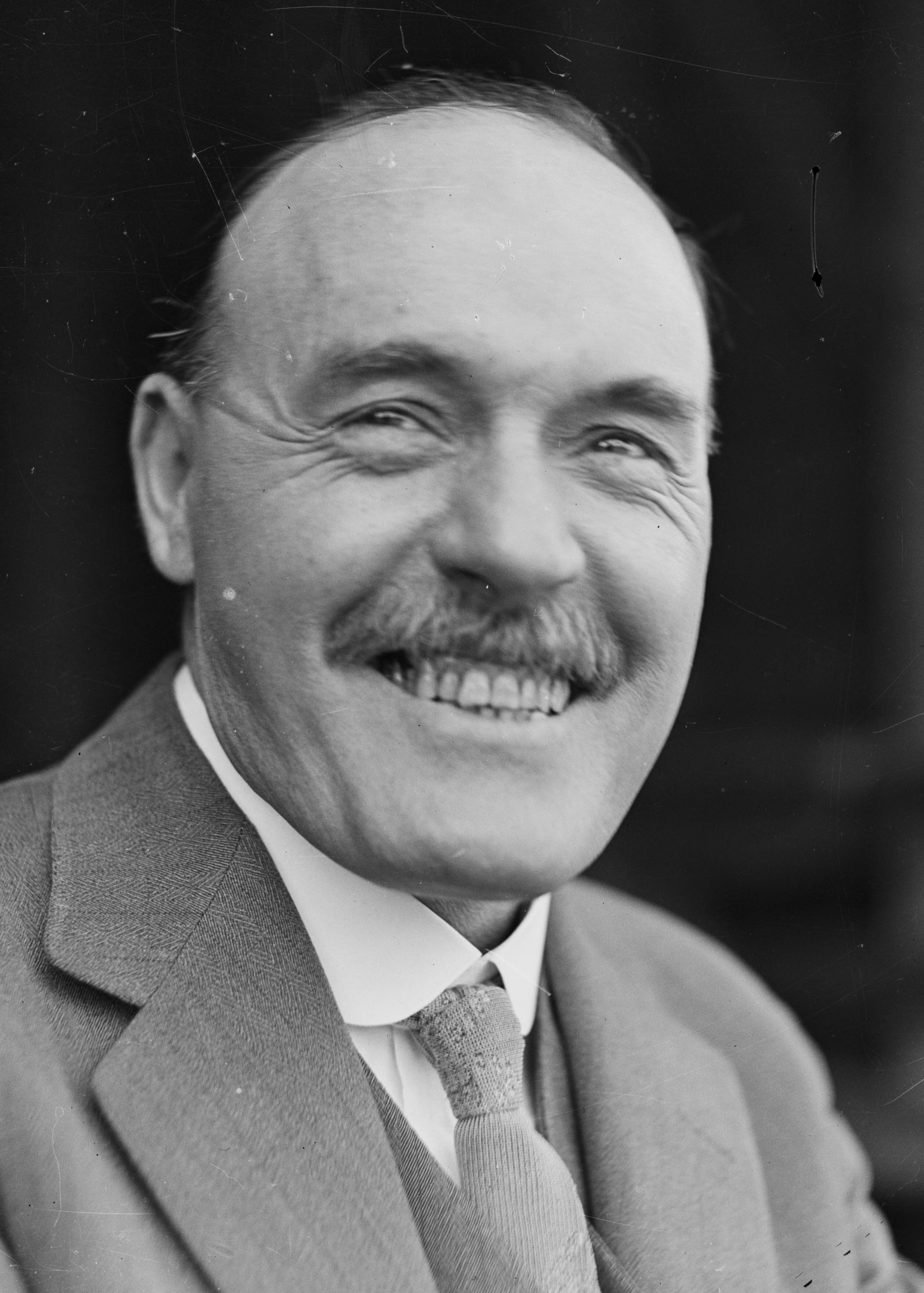
	First party	Second party	Third party
Leader	Ben Chifley	Robert Menzies	Jack Lang
Party	Labor	Coalition	Lang Labor
Seats before	21	7	0
Seats won	19	8	1
Seat change	▼2	▲1	▲1
Popular vote	880,493	700,876	69,138
Percentage	51.3%	40.9%	4.0%
Swing	▼2.4pp	▲15.3pp	▲4.0pp

=== Barton ===
This section is an excerpt from Electoral results for the Division of Barton § 1946

1946 Australian federal election: Barton
Party	Candidate	Votes	%	±%
Labor	Herbert Evatt	48,740	66.9	−7.3
Liberal	George Hohnen	24,064	33.1	+10.1
Total formal votes		72,804	98.1	
Informal votes		1,389	1.9	
Turnout		74,193	96.8	
Labor hold		Swing	−8.7	

=== Calare ===
This section is an excerpt from Electoral results for the Division of Calare § 1946

1946 Australian federal election: Calare
Party	Candidate	Votes	%	±%
Labor	John Breen	22,988	47.2	−7.2
Liberal	John Howse	14,270	29.3	+29.3
Country	Harold Thorby	11,189	23.0	−7.9
Independent	Madge Roberts	296	0.6	+0.6
Total formal votes		48,743	98.3	
Informal votes		840	1.7	
Turnout		49,583	94.5	
Two-party-preferred result
Liberal	John Howse	25,247	51.8	+11.7
Labor	John Breen	23,496	48.2	−11.7
Liberal gain from Labor		Swing	+11.7	

=== Cook ===
This section is an excerpt from Electoral results for the Division of Cook (1906–1955) § 1946

1946 Australian federal election: Cook
Party	Candidate	Votes	%	±%
Labor	Tom Sheehan	38,407	65.1	−3.8
Lang Labor	Arthur Brittain	8,423	14.3	+14.3
Liberal	Frank Preacher	7,306	12.4	+12.4
Communist	Lance Sharkey	4,341	7.4	+7.4
Independent	Frederick Fairbrother	559	0.9	+0.9
Total formal votes		59,036	96.0	
Informal votes		2,441	4.0	
Turnout		61,477	95.0	
Two-party-preferred result
Labor	Tom Sheehan		73.4	−3.0
Lang Labor	Arthur Brittain		26.6	+26.6
Labor hold		Swing	−3.0	

=== Cowper ===
This section is an excerpt from Electoral results for the Division of Cowper § 1946

1946 Australian federal election: Cowper
Party	Candidate	Votes	%	±%
Country	Sir Earle Page	31,785	57.2	+11.7
Labor	George Mitchell	21,253	38.2	−2.3
Independent	Richard Williams	2,544	4.6	+4.6
Total formal votes		55,582	99.6	
Informal votes		798	1.4	
Turnout		56,380	95.2	
Two-party-preferred result
Country	Sir Earle Page		59.5	+6.9
Labor	George Mitchell		40.5	−6.9
Country hold		Swing	+6.9	

=== Dalley ===
This section is an excerpt from Electoral results for the Division of Dalley § 1946

1946 Australian federal election: Dalley
Party	Candidate	Votes	%	±%
Labor	Sol Rosevear	38,571	63.4	−11.4
Liberal	Leslie Webster	14,674	24.1	+24.1
Lang Labor	Kenneth Falvey	7,549	12.4	+12.4
Total formal votes		60,794	97.5	
Informal votes		1,531	2.5	
Turnout		62,325	94.8	
Two-party-preferred result
Labor	Sol Rosevear		73.7	−7.4
Liberal	Leslie Webster		26.3	+26.3
Labor hold		Swing	−7.4	

=== Darling ===
This section is an excerpt from Electoral results for the Division of Darling § 1946

1946 Australian federal election: Darling
Party	Candidate	Votes	%	±%
Labor	Joe Clark	27,449	60.7	−10.9
Country	John McGirr	12,229	27.0	+27.0
Protestant People	Cyril Glassop	5,533	12.2	+12.2
Total formal votes		45,211	97.7	
Informal votes		1,058	2.3	
Turnout		46,269	89.8	
Two-party-preferred result
Labor	Joe Clark		66.8	−4.8
Country	John McGirr		32.2	+32.2
Labor hold		Swing	−4.8	

=== East Sydney ===
This section is an excerpt from Electoral results for the Division of East Sydney § 1946

1946 Australian federal election: East Sydney
Party	Candidate	Votes	%	±%
Labor	Eddie Ward	37,863	65.5	−3.5
Liberal	Ivan Dougherty	16,348	28.3	+4.8
Protestant People	Wal Campbell	3,578	6.2	+6.2
Total formal votes		57,789	97.1	
Informal votes		1,716	2.9	
Turnout		59,505	92.0	
Two-party-preferred result
Labor	Eddie Ward		67.6	−3.4
Liberal	Ivan Dougherty		32.4	+3.4
Labor hold		Swing	−3.4	

=== Eden-Monaro ===
This section is an excerpt from Electoral results for the Division of Eden-Monaro § 1946

1946 Australian federal election: Eden-Monaro
Party	Candidate	Votes	%	±%
Labor	Allan Fraser	25,231	50.2	+1.3
Liberal	Denzil Macarthur-Onslow	18,560	36.9	+15.9
Country	Pat Osborne	3,292	6.5	+6.5
Country	Allan Backhouse	2,883	5.7	+5.7
Services	Victor Brown	322	0.6	+0.6
Total formal votes		50,288	97.4	
Informal votes		1,321	2.6	
Turnout		51,609	95.0	
Two-party-preferred result
Labor	Allan Fraser		52.7	−2.7
Liberal	Denzil Macarthur-Onslow		47.3	+47.3
Labor hold		Swing	−2.7	

=== Gwydir ===
This section is an excerpt from Electoral results for the Division of Gwydir § 1946

1946 Australian federal election: Gwydir
Party	Candidate	Votes	%	±%
Labor	William Scully	22,434	48.7	−10.8
Country	Thomas Treloar	16,513	35.4	+5.4
Protestant People	William Campbell	2,661	5.8	+5.8
Liberal	Thomas Mort	1,689	3.7	+3.7
Independent Country	Ben Wade	1,350	2.9	+2.9
Services	Tom Carmody	914	2.0	+2.0
Independent	George McDonald	381	0.8	+0.8
Independent	Kevin Nott	322	0.7	+0.7
Total formal votes		46,064	95.7	
Informal votes		2,054	4.3	
Turnout		48,118	92.6	
Two-party-preferred result
Labor	William Scully		51.2	−12.5
Country	Thomas Treloar		48.8	+12.5
Labor hold		Swing	−12.5	

=== Hume ===
This section is an excerpt from Electoral results for the Division of Hume § 1946

1946 Australian federal election: Hume
Party	Candidate	Votes	%	±%
Labor	Arthur Fuller	26,720	51.8	+2.2
Country	Warren McDonald	17,474	33.9	−4.4
Liberal	Geoffrey Davey	7,397	14.3	+14.3
Total formal votes		51,591	98.3	
Informal votes		872	1.7	
Turnout		52,463	92.4	
Two-party-preferred result
Labor	Arthur Fuller		54.2	−2.1
Country	Warren McDonald		45.8	+2.1
Labor hold		Swing	−2.1	

=== Hunter ===
This section is an excerpt from Electoral results for the Division of Hunter § 1946

1946 Australian federal election: Hunter
Party	Candidate	Votes	%	±%
Labor	Rowley James	25,366	76.9	−23.1
Liberal	Ted Fletcher	10,208	17.3	+17.3
Lang Labor	John Cain	3,392	5.8	+5.8
Total formal votes		58,966	98.1	
Informal votes		1,119	1.9	
Turnout		60,085	95.8	
Two-party-preferred result
Labor	Rowley James		80.3	−19.7
Liberal	Ted Fletcher		19.7	+19.7
Labor hold		Swing	−19.7	

=== Lang ===
This section is an excerpt from Electoral results for the Division of Lang § 1946

1946 Australian federal election: Lang
Party	Candidate	Votes	%	±%
Labor	Dan Mulcahy	37,918	51.7	−9.8
Liberal	John Paget	24,963	34.0	+9.4
Communist	Adam Ogston	5,508	7.5	+1.1
Lang Labor	Sidney Bell	4,995	6.8	+6.8
Total formal votes		73,384	97.7	
Informal votes		1,708	2.3	
Turnout		75,092	96.7	
Two-party-preferred result
Labor	Dan Mulcahy		64.6	−6.4
Liberal	John Paget		35.4	+6.4
Labor hold		Swing	−6.4	

=== Macquarie ===
This section is an excerpt from Electoral results for the Division of Macquarie § 1946

1946 Australian federal election: Macquarie
Party	Candidate	Votes	%	±%
Labor	Ben Chifley	33,412	58.4	−6.6
Liberal	Eric Spooner	17,106	29.9	+2.3
Country	Cecil Williams	5,342	9.3	+9.3
Independent	John Sutton	1,344	2.3	+2.3
Total formal votes		57,204	98.1	
Informal votes		1,121	1.9	
Turnout		58,325	93.6	
Two-party-preferred result
Labor	Ben Chifley		60.5	−8.3
Liberal	Eric Spooner		39.5	+8.3
Labor hold		Swing	−8.3	

=== Martin ===
This section is an excerpt from Electoral results for the Division of Martin § 1946

1946 Australian federal election: Martin
Party	Candidate	Votes	%	±%
Labor	Fred Daly	35,998	55.0	+8.1
Liberal	Frederick Jacobs	29,507	45.0	+11.7
Total formal votes		65,505	98.1	
Informal votes		1,258	1.9	
Turnout		66,763	96.2	
Labor hold		Swing	−0.7	

=== New England ===
This section is an excerpt from Electoral results for the Division of New England § 1946

1946 Australian federal election: New England
Party	Candidate	Votes	%	±%
Country	Joe Abbott	29,664	60.6	+15.2
Labor	Leigh Cuthbertson	19,310	39.4	−7.5
Total formal votes		48,974	98.2	
Informal votes		880	1.8	
Turnout		49,854	93.9	
Country hold		Swing	+9.5	

=== Newcastle ===
This section is an excerpt from Electoral results for the Division of Newcastle § 1946

1946 Australian federal election: North Sydney
Party	Candidate	Votes	%	±%
Liberal	Billy Hughes	40,845	55.9	+11.8
Labor	Leo Haylen	32,247	44.1	+8.4
Total formal votes		73,092	98.0	
Informal votes		1,503	2.0	
Turnout		74,595	96.1	
Liberal hold		Swing	+2.8	

=== North Sydney ===
This section is an excerpt from Electoral results for the Division of North Sydney § 1946

1946 Australian federal election: Newcastle
Party	Candidate	Votes	%	±%
Labor	David Watkins	38,203	58.9	−10.3
Liberal	Allen Fairhall	15,124	23.3	+23.3
Communist	Stan Deacon	4,616	7.1	−4.2
Lang Labor	Charles Dicker	2,474	3.8	+3.8
Services	Grahame Bland	1,466	2.3	+2.3
Independent	Edwin Dark	923	1.4	+1.4
Independent	Frederick Wilson	723	1.1	+1.1
Independent	Isabel Longworth	626	1.0	+1.0
Social Credit	Arthur Clarke	360	0.6	+0.6
Service	Harry Ellis	336	0.5	+0.5
Total formal votes		64,851	94.7	
Informal votes		3,653	5.3	
Turnout		68,504	95.8	
Two-party-preferred result
Labor	David Watkins		71.3	?
Liberal	Allen Fairhall		28.7	+28.7
Labor hold		Swing	?	

=== Parkes ===
This section is an excerpt from Electoral results for the Division of Parkes (1901–1969) § 1946

1946 Australian federal election: Parkes
Party	Candidate	Votes	%	±%
Labor	Les Haylen	32,806	50.1	+1.6
Liberal	Athol Richardson	32,642	49.9	+22.1
Total formal votes		65,448	98.2	
Informal votes		1,176	1.8	
Turnout		66,624	95.6	
Labor hold		Swing	−2.8	

=== Parramatta ===
This section is an excerpt from Electoral results for the Division of Parramatta § 1946

1946 Australian federal election: Parramatta
Party	Candidate	Votes	%	±%
Liberal	Howard Beale	43,070	60.1	+21.8
Labor	Dudley Jeffree	28,645	39.9	+2.5
Total formal votes		71,715	98.1	
Informal votes		1,417	1.9	
Turnout		73,132	95.0	
Liberal hold		Swing	+0.8	

=== Reid ===
This section is an excerpt from Electoral results for the Division of Reid § 1946

1946 Australian federal election: Reid
Party	Candidate	Votes	%	±%
Labor	Charles Morgan	29,547	40.7	+5.9
Lang Labor	Jack Lang	25,049	34.5	+34.5
Liberal	Jeffrey Blaxland	15,755	21.7	+10.8
Services	William Beckett	2,194	3.0	+3.0
Total formal votes		72,545	97.6	
Informal votes		1,805	2.4	
Turnout		74,350	96.0	
Two-party-preferred result
Lang Labor	Jack Lang	39,316	54.2	+7.4
Labor	Charles Morgan	33,229	45.8	−7.4
Lang Labor gain from Labor		Swing	+7.4	

=== Richmond ===
This section is an excerpt from Electoral results for the Division of Richmond § 1946

1946 Australian federal election: Richmond
Party	Candidate	Votes	%	±%
Country	Larry Anthony	37,826	68.3	+20.1
Labor	Keith Compton	17,567	31.7	+0.1
Total formal votes		55,393	98.6	
Informal votes		814	1.4	
Turnout		56,207	93.7	
Country hold		Swing	+4.7	

=== Riverina ===
This section is an excerpt from Electoral results for the Division of Riverina § 1946

1946 Australian federal election: Riverina
Party	Candidate	Votes	%	±%
Labor	Joe Langtry	19,898	43.5	−11.8
Country	Hugh Roberton	16,284	35.6	+2.9
Liberal	Christopher Lethbridge	7,086	15.5	+15.5
Lang Labor	John Gosling	2,230	4.9	+4.9
Independent	William Pow	246	0.5	+0.5
Total formal votes		45,744	96.4	
Informal votes		1,714	3.6	
Turnout		47,458	92.8	
Two-party-preferred result
Labor	Joe Langtry	23,134	50.6	−12.5
Country	Hugh Roberton	22,610	49.4	+12.5
Labor hold		Swing	−12.5	

=== Robertson ===
This section is an excerpt from Electoral results for the Division of Robertson § 1946

1946 Australian federal election: Robertson
Party	Candidate	Votes	%	±%
Labor	Thomas Williams	32,865	50.5	+0.9
Liberal	Roy Wheeler	24,483	37.6	+0.3
Country	George Watkins	4,624	7.1	+7.1
Lang Labor	Ian Grant	3,113	4.8	+4.8
Total formal votes		65,085	97.1	
Informal votes		1,965	2.9	
Turnout		67,050	93.8	
Two-party-preferred result
Labor	Thomas Williams		53.8	−5.1
Liberal	Roy Wheeler		46.2	+5.1
Labor hold		Swing	−5.1	

=== Warringah ===
This section is an excerpt from Electoral results for the Division of Warringah § 1946

1946 Australian federal election: Warringah
Party	Candidate	Votes	%	±%
Liberal	Percy Spender	48,625	62.8	+14.3
Labor	George Godfrey	28,773	37.2	+3.5
Total formal votes		77,398	98.3	
Informal votes		1,337	1.7	
Turnout		78,735	94.4	
Liberal hold		Swing	+2.3	

=== Watson ===
This section is an excerpt from Electoral results for the Division of Watson (1934–1969) § 1946

1946 Australian federal election: Watson
Party	Candidate	Votes	%	±%
Labor	Max Falstein	38,025	53.7	+1.4
Liberal	Charles de Monchaux	24,246	34.2	+6.7
Protestant People	Charles Wilson	6,177	8.7	+8.7
Services	Wallace Knox	2,364	3.3	+3.3
Total formal votes		70,812	97.5	
Informal votes		1,809	2.5	
Turnout		72,621	94.8	
Two-party-preferred result
Labor	Max Falstein		56.7	−5.4
Liberal	Charles de Monchaux		45.3	+5.4
Labor hold		Swing	−5.4	

=== Wentworth ===
This section is an excerpt from Electoral results for the Division of Wentworth § 1946

1946 Australian federal election: Wentworth
Party	Candidate	Votes	%	±%
Liberal	Eric Harrison	40,790	54.3	+21.4
Labor	Jessie Street	31,432	41.8	−1.7
Lang Labor	Charles Walsh	2,898	3.9	+3.9
Total formal votes		75,120	98.0	
Informal votes		1,501	2.0	
Turnout		76,621	93.8	
Two-party-preferred result
Liberal	Eric Harrison		55.3	+3.7
Labor	Jessie Street		44.7	−3.7
Liberal hold		Swing	+3.7	

=== Werriwa ===
This section is an excerpt from Electoral results for the Division of Werriwa § 1946

1946 Australian federal election: Werriwa
Party	Candidate	Votes	%	±%
Labor	Bert Lazzarini	39,408	54.0	−14.7
Liberal	Ray Watson	26,993	37.0	+37.0
Communist	Les Mullin	6,511	8.9	+8.9
Total formal votes		72,912	98.0	
Informal votes		1,478	2.0	
Turnout		74,390	94.9	
Two-party-preferred result
Labor	Bert Lazzarini		62.1	−12.6
Liberal	Ray Watson		37.9	+37.9
Labor hold		Swing	−12.6	

=== West Sydney ===
This section is an excerpt from Electoral results for the Division of West Sydney § 1946

1946 Australian federal election: West Sydney
Party	Candidate	Votes	%	±%
Labor	William O'Connor	29,417	56.6	−13.1
Lang Labor	Thomas Ryan	7,671	14.8	+14.8
Liberal	John Mant	6,300	12.1	+12.1
Communist	Stan Moran	4,380	8.4	+8.4
Protestant People	Ronald Sarina	2,162	4.2	+4.2
Independent	Malinda Ivey	2,063	4.0	+4.0
Total formal votes		51,993	94.8	
Informal votes		2,829	5.2	
Turnout		54,822	91.9	
Two-party-preferred result
Labor	William O'Connor		77.4	−1.8
Lang Labor	Thomas Ryan		22.6	+22.6
Labor hold		Swing	−1.8	

== Victoria ==
1946 Australian federal election (Victoria)
← 1943	28 September 1946	1949 →

All 20 Victorian seats in the House of Representatives 10 seats needed for a majority
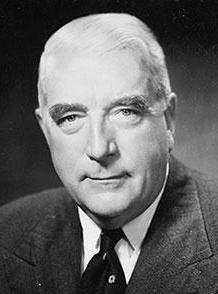

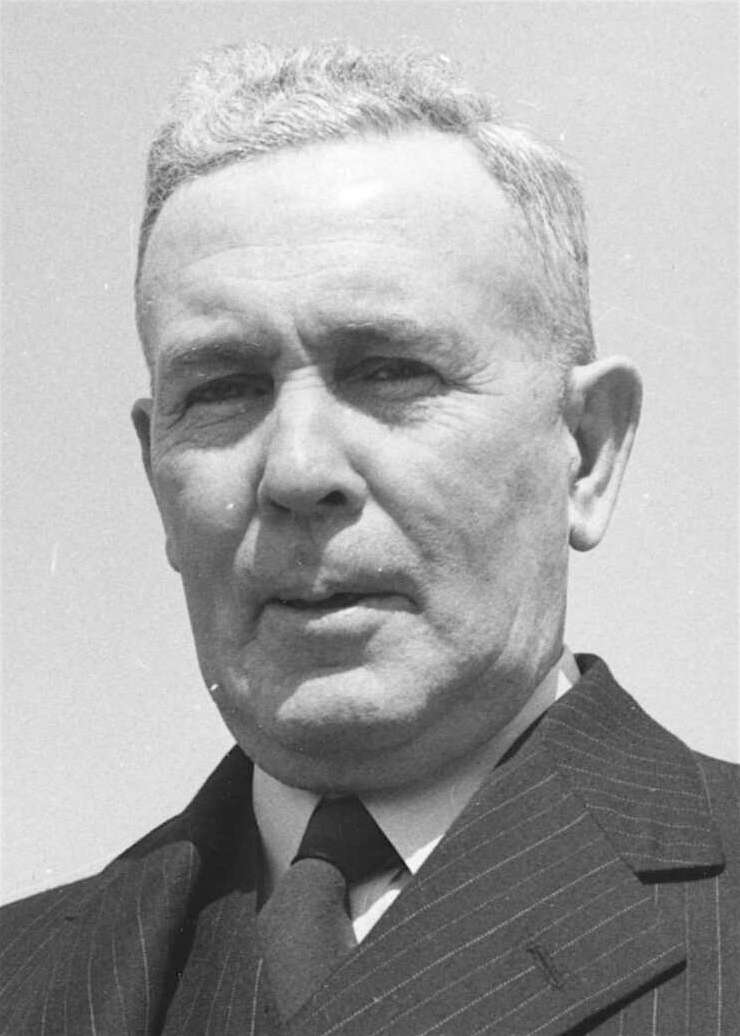
	First party	Second party
Leader	Robert Menzies	Ben Chifley
Party	Coalition	Labor
Seats before	9	9
Seats won	11	8
Seat change	▲2	▼1
Popular vote	583,180	592,000
Percentage	47.2%	47.9%
Swing	▲16.4pp	▲3.8pp

=== Balaclava ===
This section is an excerpt from Electoral results for the Division of Balaclava § 1946

1946 Australian federal election: Balaclava
Party	Candidate	Votes	%	±%
Liberal	Thomas White	45,137	58.4	+6.8
Labor	Maurice Ashkanasy	32,087	41.6	+5.3
Total formal votes		77,224	98.3	
Informal votes		1,348	1.7	
Turnout		78,572	93.4	
Liberal hold		Swing	+1.8	

=== Ballaarat ===
This section is an excerpt from Electoral results for the Division of Ballarat § 1946

1946 Australian federal election: Ballaarat
Party	Candidate	Votes	%	±%
Labor	Reg Pollard	25,827	53.1	−1.4
Liberal	Arnold Caddy	22,812	46.9	+6.2
Total formal votes		48,639	98.7	
Informal votes		617	1.3	
Turnout		49,256	95.7	
Labor hold		Swing	−4.8	

=== Batman ===
This section is an excerpt from Electoral results for the Division of Batman § 1946

1946 Australian federal election: Batman
Party	Candidate	Votes	%	±%
Labor	Frank Brennan	39,754	58.3	−6.0
Liberal	John McColl	20,930	30.7	+9.8
Independent	Allan Brennan	4,250	6.2	+6.2
Communist	George Oke	3,222	4.7	+4.7
Total formal votes		68,156	97.3	
Informal votes		1,881	2.7	
Turnout		70,037	95.7	
Two-party-preferred result
Labor	Frank Brennan		66.7	−7.9
Liberal	John McColl		33.3	+7.9
Labor hold		Swing	−7.9	

=== Bendigo ===
This section is an excerpt from Electoral results for the Division of Bendigo § 1946

1946 Australian federal election: Bendigo
Party	Candidate	Votes	%	±%
Labor	Ernest Duus	19,613	42.9	+0.1
Country	George Rankin	15,780	34.5	−10.4
Liberal	Joseph Hall	10,323	22.6	+22.6
Total formal votes		45,716	98.6	
Informal votes		664	1.4	
Turnout		46,380	95.4	
Two-party-preferred result
Country	George Rankin	25,172	55.1	+2.8
Labor	Ernest Duus	20,544	44.9	−2.8
Country hold		Swing	+2.8	

=== Bourke ===
This section is an excerpt from Electoral results for the Division of Bourke § 1946

1946 Australian federal election: Bourke
Party	Candidate	Votes	%	±%
Labor	Bill Bryson	30,620	45.4	+7.7
Independent Labor	Doris Blackburn	18,625	27.6	+27.6
Liberal	Russell Stokes	16,889	25.0	+6.7
Services	Henry Brand	1,333	2.0	+2.0
Total formal votes		67,467	96.6	
Informal votes		2,342	3.4	
Turnout		69,809	93.3	
Two-party-preferred result
Independent Labor	Doris Blackburn	34,478	51.1	+4.7
Labor	Bill Bryson	32,989	48.9	−4.7
Independent Labor gain from Labor		Swing	+4.7	

=== Corangamite ===
This section is an excerpt from Electoral results for the Division of Corangamite § 1946

1946 Australian federal election: Corangamite
Party	Candidate	Votes	%	±%
Liberal	Allan McDonald	25,999	54.9	+7.7
Labor	Henry Stacpoole	21,317	45.1	+0.0
Total formal votes		47,316	99.2	
Informal votes		393	0.8	
Turnout		47,709	94.7	
Liberal hold		Swing	+1.8	

=== Corio ===
This section is an excerpt from Electoral results for the Division of Corio § 1946

1946 Australian federal election: Corio
Party	Candidate	Votes	%	±%
Labor	John Dedman	34,330	56.4	+4.1
Liberal	Frederick Wallace	25,546	42.0	+24.5
Independent	Winifred West	968	1.6	+1.6
Total formal votes		60,844	98.6	
Informal votes		838	1.4	
Turnout		61,682	94.6	
Two-party-preferred result
Labor	John Dedman		57.2	+2.4
Liberal	Frederick Wallace		42.8	+42.8
Labor hold		Swing	+2.4	

=== Deakin ===
This section is an excerpt from Electoral results for the Division of Deakin § 1946

1946 Australian federal election: Deakin
Party	Candidate	Votes	%	±%
Liberal	William Hutchinson	36,262	56.7	+24.0
Labor	Arthur Smith	27,710	43.3	+5.6
Total formal votes		63,972	98.5	
Informal votes		1,002	1.5	
Turnout		64,974	93.7	
Liberal hold		Swing	+0.0	

=== Fawkner ===
This section is an excerpt from Electoral results for the Division of Fawkner § 1946

1946 Australian federal election: Fawkner
Party	Candidate	Votes	%	±%
Liberal	Harold Holt	39,047	53.5	+20.1
Labor	Bill Bourke	30,835	42.2	+9.4
Independent	Mascotte Brown	2,121	2.9	+2.9
Services	Harold Rettig	1,042	1.4	+1.4
Total formal votes		73,045	97.1	
Informal votes		2,155	2.9	
Turnout		75,200	89.5	
Two-party-preferred result
Liberal	Harold Holt		56.2	−1.8
Labor	Bill Bourke		43.8	+1.8
Liberal hold		Swing	−1.8	

=== Flinders ===
This section is an excerpt from Electoral results for the Division of Flinders § 1946

1946 Australian federal election: Flinders
Party	Candidate	Votes	%	±%
Liberal	Rupert Ryan	36,615	54.4	+17.6
Labor	Frank Lee	30,698	45.6	+6.0
Total formal votes		67,313	98.4	
Informal votes		1,087	1.6	
Turnout		68,400	93.5	
Liberal hold		Swing	+2.6	

=== Gippsland ===
This section is an excerpt from Electoral results for the Division of Gippsland § 1946

1946 Australian federal election: Gippsland
Party	Candidate	Votes	%	±%
Country	George Bowden	28,526	55.2	+18.7
Labor	Adam Keltie	20,196	39.1	−6.0
Communist	Wally Williames	2,994	5.8	+5.8
Total formal votes		51,716	98.4	
Informal votes		824	1.6	
Turnout		52,540	94.6	
Two-party-preferred result
Country	George Bowden		55.8	+3.4
Labor	Adam Keltie		44.2	−3.4
Country hold		Swing	+3.4	

=== Henty ===
This section is an excerpt from Electoral results for the Division of Henty § 1946

1946 Australian federal election: Henty
Party	Candidate	Votes	%	±%
Liberal	Jo Gullett	41,069	52.1	+14.0
Labor	Val Doube	37,785	47.9	+47.9
Total formal votes		78,854	98.5	
Informal votes		1,196	1.5	
Turnout		80,050	95.0	
Liberal hold		Swing	+14.0	

1946 Henty by-election
Party	Candidate	Votes	%	±%
Liberal	Jo Gullett	38,718	54.3	+16.2
Labor	Val Doube	32,556	45.7	+45.7
Total formal votes		71,274	98.5	
Informal votes		1,086	1.5	
Turnout		72,360	89.5	
Liberal gain from Independent		Swing	+9.8	

=== Indi ===
This section is an excerpt from Electoral results for the Division of Indi § 1946

1946 Australian federal election: Indi
Party	Candidate	Votes	%	±%
Country	John McEwen	33,634	65.9	+7.1
Independent Country	John Chanter	17,406	34.1	+34.1
Total formal votes		51,040	98.1	
Informal votes		1,005	1.9	
Turnout		52,045	92.9	
Country hold		Swing	+6.7	

=== Kooyong ===
This section is an excerpt from Electoral results for the Division of Kooyong § 1946

1946 Australian federal election: Kooyong
Party	Candidate	Votes	%	±%
Liberal	Robert Menzies	49,298	61.7	+13.1
Labor	Albert Nicholls	25,494	31.9	+5.2
Communist	Ted Laurie	5,134	6.4	−1.8
Total formal votes		79,926	98.4	
Informal votes		1,299	1.6	
Turnout		81,225	93.7	
Two-party-preferred result
Liberal	Robert Menzies		63.3	+0.8
Labor	Albert Nicholls		36.7	−0.8
Liberal hold		Swing	+0.8	

=== Maribyrnong ===
This section is an excerpt from Electoral results for the Division of Maribyrnong § 1946

1946 Australian federal election: Maribyrnong
Party	Candidate	Votes	%	±%
Labor	Arthur Drakeford	48,424	65.8	−1.8
Liberal	Adrian Cole	25,155	34.2	+34.2
Total formal votes		73,579	98.3	
Informal votes		1,297	1.7	
Turnout		74,876	95.7	
Labor hold		Swing	−8.7	

=== Melbourne ===
This section is an excerpt from Electoral results for the Division of Melbourne § 1946

1946 Australian federal election: Melbourne
Party	Candidate	Votes	%	±%
Labor	Arthur Calwell	42,922	73.4	+9.6
Liberal	Reg Cooper	15,572	26.6	+9.2
Total formal votes		58,494	96.3	
Informal votes		2,235	3.7	
Turnout		60,729	89.9	
Labor hold		Swing	−1.8	

=== Melbourne Ports ===
This section is an excerpt from Electoral results for the Division of Melbourne Ports § 1946

1946 Australian federal election: Melbourne Ports
Party	Candidate	Votes	%	±%
Labor	Jack Holloway	43,905	66.7	−6.1
Liberal	Douglas Dennis	21,884	33.3	+6.1
Total formal votes		65,789	97.5	
Informal votes		1,705	2.5	
Turnout		67,494	92.2	
Labor hold		Swing	−6.1	

=== Wannon ===
This section is an excerpt from Electoral results for the Division of Wannon § 1946

1946 Australian federal election: Wannon
Party	Candidate	Votes	%	±%
Labor	Don McLeod	24,387	47.3	−4.1
Liberal	Dan Mackinnon	15,262	29.6	+11.0
Country	Leonard Rodda	11,955	23.1	+1.5
Total formal votes		51,604	98.9	
Informal votes		551	1.1	
Turnout		52,155	96.9	
Two-party-preferred result
Labor	Don McLeod	26,409	51.2	−2.9
Liberal	Dan Mackinnon	25,195	48.8	+2.9
Labor hold		Swing	−2.9	

=== Wimmera ===
This section is an excerpt from Electoral results for the Division of Wimmera § 1946

1946 Australian federal election: Wimmera
Party	Candidate	Votes	%	±%
Country	Winton Turnbull	26,551	62.1	+3.1
Labor	Alfred Loveridge	16,216	37.9	+37.9
Total formal votes		42,767	98.6	
Informal votes		601	1.4	
Turnout		43,368	94.1	
Country hold		Swing	+3.1	

1946 Wimmera by-election
Party	Candidate	Votes	%	±%
Country	Winton Turnbull	15,284	43.1	+43.1
Country	Anthony Everett	6,724	19.0	+19.0
Independent Country	James Stoddart	6,361	17.9	+17.9
Independent Labor	John Smith	2,923	8.2	+8.2
Independent	Arnold Eberle	2,042	5.8	+5.8
Independent Labor	Frederick Arlington-Burke	1,824	5.1	+5.1
Independent	Louis Phillips	312	0.9	+0.9
Total formal votes		35,470	95.5	
Informal votes		1,692	4.5	
Turnout		37,162	82.9	
Two-party-preferred result
Country	Winton Turnbull	20,924	59.0	+59.0
Country	Anthony Everett	14,546	41.0	+41.0
Country gain from Independent		Swing	+59.0	

=== Yarra ===
This section is an excerpt from Electoral results for the Division of Yarra § 1946

1946 Australian federal election: Yarra
Party	Candidate	Votes	%	±%
Labor	James Scullin	39,880	63.7	+3.3
Liberal	Kenneth Bisney	18,934	30.2	+11.6
Communist	Ken Miller	3,838	6.1	−4.7
Total formal votes		62,652	96.6	
Informal votes		2,221	3.4	
Turnout		64,873	93.1	
Two-party-preferred result
Labor	James Scullin		69.3	−5.0
Liberal	Kenneth Bisney		30.7	+5.0
Labor hold		Swing	−5.0	

== Queensland ==
1946 Australian federal election (Queensland)
← 1943	28 September 1946	1949 →

All 10 Queensland seats in the House of Representatives 5 seats needed for a majority
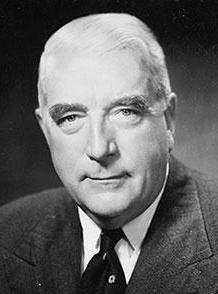

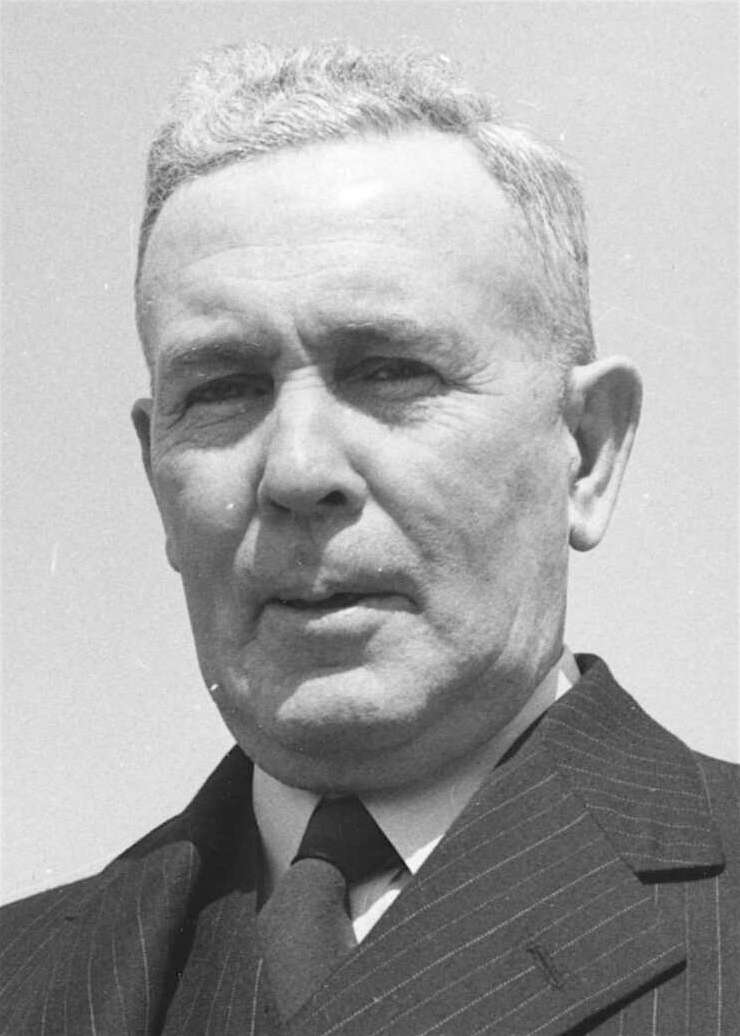
	First party	Second party
Leader	Robert Menzies	Ben Chifley
Party	Coalition	Labor
Seats before	4	6
Seats won	5	5
Seat change	▲1	▼1
Popular vote	282,573	256,370
Percentage	47.4%	43.1%
Swing	▲8.4pp	▼4.7pp

=== Brisbane ===
This section is an excerpt from Electoral results for the Division of Brisbane § 1946

1946 Australian federal election: Brisbane
Party	Candidate	Votes	%	±%
Labor	George Lawson	33,763	54.6	+3.7
Liberal	Geoffrey Ward	22,314	36.1	+18.1
Services	Gordon Olive	5,806	9.4	+9.4
Total formal votes		61,883	96.7	
Informal votes		2,086	3.3	
Turnout		63,969	92.2	
Two-party-preferred result
Labor	George Lawson		57.0	+3.4
Liberal	Geoffrey Ward		43.0	+43.0
Labor hold		Swing	+3.4	

=== Capricornia ===
This section is an excerpt from Electoral results for the Division of Capricornia § 1946

1946 Australian federal election: Capricornia
Party	Candidate	Votes	%	±%
National	Charles Davidson	28,999	49.9	+5.8
Labor	Frank Forde	26,611	45.8	−10.1
Services	Andrew Taylor	2,454	4.2	+4.2
Total formal votes		58,064	98.2	
Informal votes		1,094	1.8	
Turnout		59,158	94.1	
Two-party-preferred result
National	Charles Davidson	30,731	52.9	+8.8
Labor	Frank Forde	27,333	47.1	−8.8
National gain from Labor		Swing	+8.8	

=== Darling Downs ===
This section is an excerpt from Electoral results for the Division of Darling Downs § 1946

1946 Australian federal election: Darling Downs
Party	Candidate	Votes	%	±%
Country	Arthur Fadden	31,550	59.9	+11.3
Labor	William English	17,902	34.0	−9.3
Services	Maxwell Owen	3,209	6.1	+6.1
Total formal votes		52,661	98.3	
Informal votes		901	1.7	
Turnout		53,562	96.2	
Two-party-preferred result
Country	Arthur Fadden		61.9	+9.4
Labor	William English		38.1	−9.4
Country hold		Swing	+9.4	

=== Griffith ===
This section is an excerpt from Electoral results for the Division of Griffith § 1946

1946 Australian federal election: Griffith
Party	Candidate	Votes	%	±%
Labor	William Conelan	33,725	50.1	−7.3
Liberal	William Scott	25,960	38.6	+9.4
Services	Arthur Chresby	7,565	11.2	+11.2
Total formal votes		67,260	96.4	
Informal votes		2,518	3.6	
Turnout		69,778	94.8	
Two-party-preferred result
Labor	William Conelan		53.9	−11.2
Liberal	William Scott		46.1	+11.2
Labor hold		Swing	−11.2	

=== Herbert ===
This section is an excerpt from Electoral results for the Division of Herbert § 1946

1946 Australian federal election: Herbert
Party	Candidate	Votes	%	±%
Labor	Bill Edmonds	28,246	46.0	+8.4
Country	Lloyd Roberts	20,804	33.9	+11.2
Communist	Jack Henry	9,404	15.3	−18.9
Independent	Joseph Pollard	1,668	2.7	+2.7
Services	Alexander McNamee	1,236	2.0	+2.0
Total formal votes		61,358	95.3	
Informal votes		3,050	4.7	
Turnout		64,408	90.5	
Two-party-preferred result
Labor	Bill Edmonds	37,026	60.3	−1.4
Country	Lloyd Roberts	24,332	39.7	+39.7
Labor hold		Swing	−1.4	

=== Kennedy ===
This section is an excerpt from Electoral results for the Division of Kennedy § 1946

1946 Australian federal election: Kennedy
Party	Candidate	Votes	%	±%
Labor	Bill Riordan	25,404	57.5	−7.7
Country	Clement Cummings	18,769	42.5	+18.7
Total formal votes		44,173	97.5	
Informal votes		1,120	2.5	
Turnout		45,293	84.0	
Labor hold		Swing	−14.2	

=== Lilley ===
This section is an excerpt from Electoral results for the Division of Lilley § 1946

1946 Australian federal election: Lilley
Party	Candidate	Votes	%	±%
Labor	Jim Hadley	32,780	45.8	+0.1
Liberal	Charles Wilson	31,072	43.4	−2.4
Services	George Mocatta	7,776	10.9	+10.9
Total formal votes		71,628	97.0	
Informal votes		2,216	3.0	
Turnout		73,844	95.9	
Two-party-preferred result
Labor	Jim Hadley	36,350	50.7	+0.4
Liberal	Charles Wilson	35,278	49.3	−0.4
Labor hold		Swing	+0.4	

=== Maranoa ===
This section is an excerpt from Electoral results for the Division of Maranoa § 1946

1946 Australian federal election: Maranoa
Party	Candidate	Votes	%	±%
Country	Charles Adermann	29,547	58.0	+7.0
Labor	John Dufficy	18,934	37.2	−11.8
Services	John Walker	2,441	4.8	+4.8
Total formal votes		50,922	98.2	
Informal votes		909	1.8	
Turnout		51,831	89.6	
Two-party-preferred result
Country	Charles Adermann		61.6	+10.6
Labor	John Dufficy		38.4	−10.6
Country hold		Swing	+10.6	

=== Moreton ===
This section is an excerpt from Electoral results for the Division of Moreton § 1946

1946 Australian federal election: Moreton
Party	Candidate	Votes	%	±%
Liberal	Josiah Francis	42,521	60.4	+10.4
Labor	Jack Perrett	22,934	32.6	−8.4
Services	Charles McCormack	4,985	7.1	+7.1
Total formal votes		70,440	97.7	
Informal votes		1,690	2.3	
Turnout		72,130	94.2	
Two-party-preferred result
Liberal	Josiah Francis		65.7	+9.0
Labor	Jack Perrett		34.3	−9.0
Liberal hold		Swing	+9.0	

=== Wide Bay ===
This section is an excerpt from Electoral results for the Division of Wide Bay § 1946

1946 Australian federal election: Wide Bay
Party	Candidate	Votes	%	±%
Country	Bernard Corser	31,027	54.3	+1.5
Labor	George Watson	16,071	28.1	−6.6
Services	Eric Paterson	7,866	13.8	+13.8
Communist	Max Julius	2,142	3.8	+3.8
Total formal votes		57,106	98.1	
Informal votes		1,091	1.9	
Turnout		58,197	93.4	
Two-party-preferred result
Country	Bernard Corser		65.1	+8.6
Labor	George Watson		34.9	−8.6
Country hold		Swing	+8.6	

== South Australia ==
1946 Australian federal election (South Australia)
← 1943	28 September 1946	1949 →

All 6 SA seats in the House of Representatives 3 seats needed for a majority
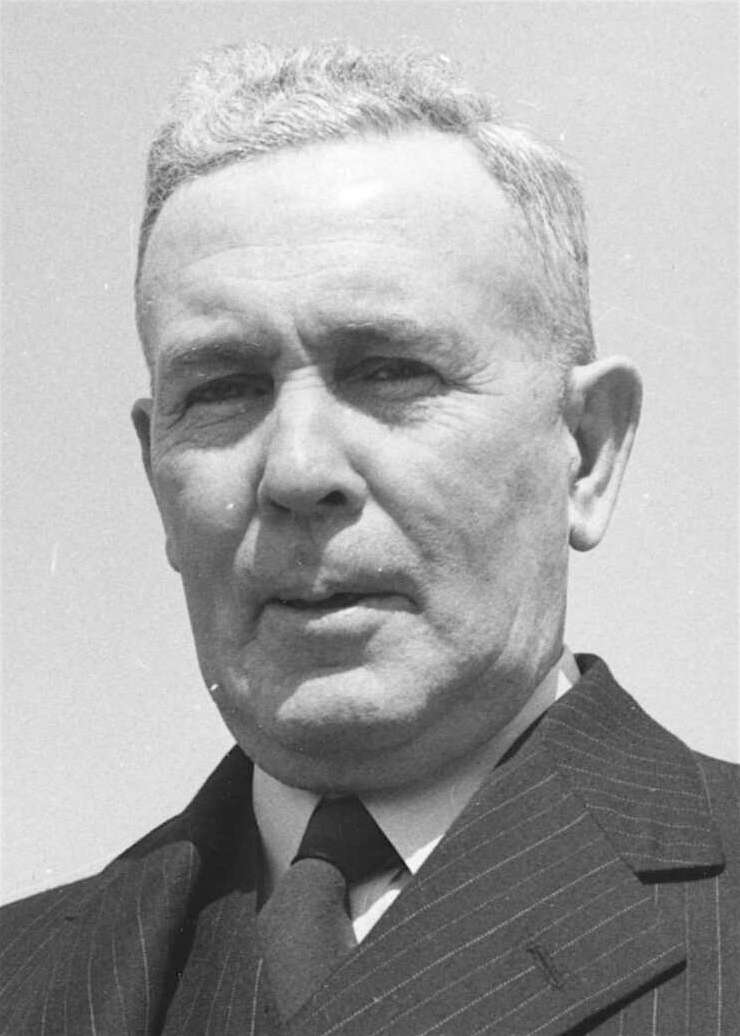

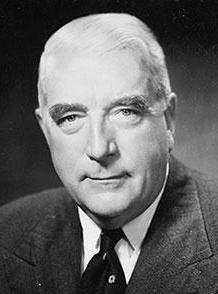
	First party	Second party
Leader	Ben Chifley	Robert Menzies
Party	Labor	Coalition
Seats before	5	1
Seats won	4	2
Seat change	▼1	▲1
Popular vote	210,862	161,215
Percentage	54.5%	41.7%
Swing	Steady	▲2.8pp

=== Adelaide ===
This section is an excerpt from Electoral results for the Division of Adelaide § 1946

1946 Australian federal election: Adelaide
Party	Candidate	Votes	%	±%
Labor	Cyril Chambers	40,638	59.9	−0.1
Liberal	Ian Hayward	24,238	35.7	+1.9
Communist	Alf Watt	2,986	4.4	+0.1
Total formal votes		67,862	96.0	
Informal votes		2,805	4.0	
Turnout		70,667	93.3	
Two-party-preferred result
Labor	Cyril Chambers		63.9	−1.7
Liberal	Ian Hayward		36.1	+1.7
Labor hold		Swing	−1.7	

=== Barker ===
This section is an excerpt from Electoral results for the Division of Barker § 1946

1946 Australian federal election: Barker
Party	Candidate	Votes	%	±%
Liberal	Archie Cameron	34,619	54.0	+13.4
Labor	Harry Krantz	26,500	41.3	+1.3
Independent	David Eddy	2,992	4.7	+4.7
Total formal votes		64,111	97.3	
Informal votes		1,781	2.7	
Turnout		65,892	95.9	
Two-party-preferred result
Liberal	Archie Cameron		56.4	−4.7
Labor	Harry Krantz		43.6	+4.7
Liberal hold		Swing	+4.7	

=== Boothby ===
This section is an excerpt from Electoral results for the Division of Boothby § 1946

1946 Australian federal election: Boothby
Party	Candidate	Votes	%	±%
Labor	Thomas Sheehy	39,724	51.8	+9.5
Liberal	Keith Wilson	36,941	48.2	+3.2
Total formal votes		76,665	97.2	
Informal votes		2,169	2.8	
Turnout		78,834	95.7	
Labor hold		Swing	+0.9	

=== Grey ===
This section is an excerpt from Electoral results for the Division of Grey § 1946

1946 Australian federal election: Grey
Party	Candidate	Votes	%	±%
Labor	Edgar Russell	27,479	55.5	+3.0
Liberal	Oliver Badman	22,016	44.5	−3.0
Total formal votes		49,495	97.8	
Informal votes		1,128	2.2	
Turnout		50,623	95.2	
Labor hold		Swing	+3.0	

=== Hindmarsh ===
This section is an excerpt from Electoral results for the Division of Hindmarsh § 1946

1946 Australian federal election: Hindmarsh
Party	Candidate	Votes	%	±%
Labor	Albert Thompson	52,475	68.4	−8.4
Liberal	William Palmer	16,462	21.5	−1.7
Communist	Alan Finger	7,731	10.1	+10.1
Total formal votes		76,668	96.3	
Informal votes		2,931	3.7	
Turnout		79,599	95.2	
Two-party-preferred result
Labor	Albert Thompson		76.5	−0.3
Liberal	William Palmer		23.5	+0.3
Labor hold		Swing	−0.3	

=== Wakefield ===
This section is an excerpt from Electoral results for the Division of Wakefield § 1946

1946 Australian federal election: Wakefield
Party	Candidate	Votes	%	±%
Liberal	Philip McBride	26,894	51.5	+2.7
Labor	Albert Smith	24,046	46.1	−5.1
Independent	Frank Rieck	1,260	2.4	+2.4
Total formal votes		52,200	97.2	
Informal votes		1,486	2.8	
Turnout		53,686	94.7	
Two-party-preferred result
Liberal	Philip McBride		52.7	+3.9
Labor	Albert Smith		47.3	−3.9
Liberal gain from Labor		Swing	+3.9	

== Western Australia ==
1946 Australian federal election (Western Australia)
← 1943	28 September 1946	1949 →

All 5 WA seats in the House of Representatives 3 seats needed for a majority
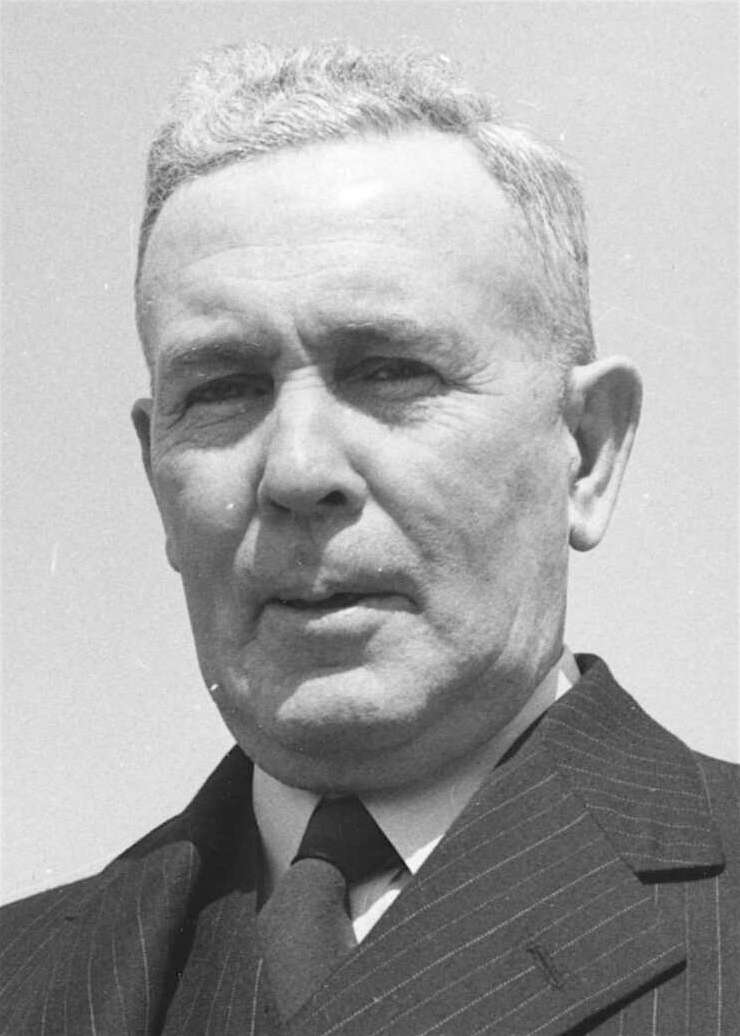

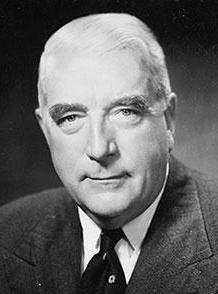
	First party	Second party
Leader	Ben Chifley	Robert Menzies
Party	Labor	Coalition
Seats before	5	0
Seats won	4	1
Seat change	▼1	▲1
Popular vote	148,473	104,369
Percentage	54.8%	38.5%
Swing	▼1.2pp	▲17.4pp

=== Forrest ===
This section is an excerpt from Electoral results for the Division of Forrest § 1946

1946 Australian federal election: Forrest
Party	Candidate	Votes	%	±%
Labor	Nelson Lemmon	23,944	50.1	−2.8
Liberal	James Cumming	13,349	28.0	+28.0
Country	Jasper Norton	10,466	21.9	−12.4
Total formal votes		47,759	97.8	
Informal votes		1,064	2.2	
Turnout		48,823	94.5	
Two-party-preferred result
Labor	Nelson Lemmon		52.3	−6.1
Liberal	James Cumming		47.7	+47.7
Labor hold		Swing	−6.1	

=== Fremantle ===
This section is an excerpt from Electoral results for the Division of Fremantle § 1946

1946 Australian federal election: Fremantle
Party	Candidate	Votes	%	±%
Labor	Kim Beazley Sr.	45,383	64.1	−2.8
Liberal	Claude Henderson	25,428	35.9	+22.0
Total formal votes		70,811	97.4	
Informal votes		1,908	2.6	
Turnout		72,719	94.1	
Labor hold		Swing	−5.0	

=== Kalgoorlie ===
This section is an excerpt from Electoral results for the Division of Kalgoorlie § 1946

1946 Australian federal election: Kalgoorlie
Party	Candidate	Votes	%	±%
Labor	Herbert Johnson	22,655	68.0	+0.4
Liberal	Seddon Vincent	10,646	32.0	−9.6
Total formal votes		33,301	97.8	
Informal votes		749	2.2	
Turnout		34,050	90.0	
Labor hold		Swing	−7.4	

=== Perth ===
This section is an excerpt from Electoral results for the Division of Perth § 1946

1946 Australian federal election: Perth
Party	Candidate	Votes	%	±%
Labor	Tom Burke	31,231	49.0	+6.7
Liberal	Jim Paton	27,429	43.1	+13.7
Services	John Graham	2,167	3.4	+3.4
Communist	Kevin Healy	2,004	3.1	−3.0
Independent	Robert Salter	889	1.4	+1.4
Total formal votes		63,710	95.8	
Informal votes		2,820	4.2	
Turnout		66,530	92.6	
Two-party-preferred result
Labor	Tom Burke		52.4	−3.6
Liberal	Jim Paton		47.6	+3.6
Labor hold		Swing	−3.6	

=== Swan ===
This section is an excerpt from Electoral results for the Division of Swan § 1946

1946 Australian federal election: Swan
Party	Candidate	Votes	%	±%
Labor	Don Mountjoy	25,260	45.6	−4.5
Country	Len Hamilton	17,223	31.1	−15.2
Independent	Bill Grayden	12,856	23.2	+23.2
Total formal votes		55,339	97.2	
Informal votes		1,605	2.8	
Turnout		56,944	92.2	
Two-party-preferred result
Country	Len Hamilton	27,790	50.2	+50.2
Labor	Don Mountjoy	27,549	49.8	−3.2
Country gain from Labor		Swing	+3.2	

== Tasmania ==
1946 Australian federal election (Tasmania)
← 1943	28 September 1946	1949 →

All 5 Tasmanian seats in the House of Representatives 3 seats needed for a majority
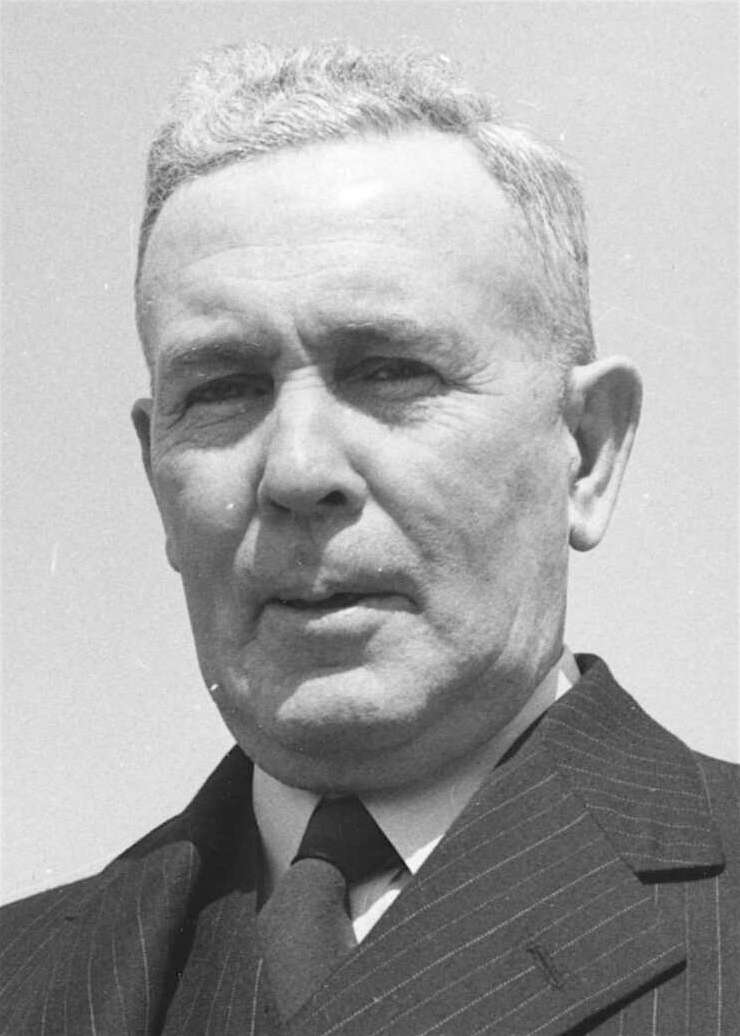

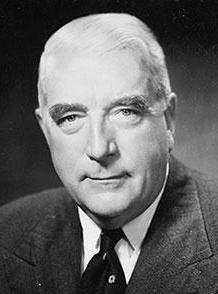
	First party	Second party
Leader	Ben Chifley	Robert Menzies
Party	Labor	Coalition
Seats before	3	2
Seats won	3	2
Seat change	Steady	Steady
Popular vote	71,755	64,136
Percentage	50.8%	45.4%
Swing	▲1.5pp	▲4.3pp

=== Bass ===
This section is an excerpt from Electoral results for the Division of Bass § 1946

1946 Australian federal election: Bass
Party	Candidate	Votes	%	±%
Labor	Claude Barnard	13,495	50.0	−1.2
Liberal	Harry Spotswood	8,219	30.4	+12.8
Independent	John Orchard	5,281	19.6	+2.0
Total formal votes		26,995	98.0	
Informal votes		557	2.0	
Turnout		27,552	93.9	
Two-party-preferred result
Labor	Claude Barnard	15,387	57.0	−0.3
Liberal	Harry Spotswood	11,608	43.0	+0.3
Labor hold		Swing	−0.3	

=== Darwin ===
This section is an excerpt from Electoral results for the Division of Darwin § 1946

1946 Australian federal election: Darwin
Party	Candidate	Votes	%	±%
Liberal	Dame Enid Lyons	15,835	54.2	+5.3
Labor	Harold Kirkpatrick	13,392	45.8	+3.2
Total formal votes		29,227	97.6	
Informal votes		730	2.4	
Turnout		29,957	92.4	
Liberal hold		Swing	+2.7	

=== Denison ===
This section is an excerpt from Electoral results for the Division of Denison § 1946

1946 Australian federal election: Denison
Party	Candidate	Votes	%	±%
Labor	Frank Gaha	16,231	57.0	+9.7
Liberal	Bruce Hamilton	12,227	43.0	+4.3
Total formal votes		28,458	97.0	
Informal votes		874	3.0	
Turnout		29,332	93.4	
Labor hold		Swing	−2.0	

=== Franklin ===
This section is an excerpt from Electoral results for the Division of Franklin § 1946

1946 Australian federal election: Franklin
Party	Candidate	Votes	%	±%
Liberal	Bill Falkinder	15,678	50.1	+9.0
Labor	Charles Frost	15,605	49.9	−9.0
Total formal votes		31,283	97.3	
Informal votes		876	2.7	
Turnout		32,159	94.6	
Liberal gain from Labor		Swing	+10.0	

=== Wilmot ===
This section is an excerpt from Electoral results for the Division of Wilmot § 1946

1946 Australian federal election: Wilmot
Party	Candidate	Votes	%	±%
Labor	Gil Duthie	13,032	51.7	+6.1
Liberal	Allan Guy	12,177	48.3	−0.9
Total formal votes		25,209	97.4	
Informal votes		671	2.6	
Turnout		25,880	94.6	
Labor gain from Liberal		Swing	+3.4	

== Northern Territory ==
=== Northern Territory ===
This section is an excerpt from Electoral results for the Division of Northern Territory § 1946

1946 Australian federal election: Northern Territory
Party	Candidate	Votes	%	±%
Independent	Adair Blain	1,281	42.4	+6.9
Independent Labor	Leigh Wallman	924	30.6	+30.6
Labor	Bob Murray	677	22.4	−5.8
Independent	Ralph Edwards	141	4.7	+4.7
Total formal votes		3,023	99.0	
Informal votes		30	1.0	
Turnout		3,053	73.3	
Two-party-preferred result
Independent	Adair Blain	1,690	55.9	+3.3
Independent Labor	Leigh Wallman	1,333	44.1	+44.1
Independent hold		Swing	+3.3	

== See also ==
- Candidates of the 1946 Australian federal election
- Members of the Australian House of Representatives, 1946–1949
