= Candidates of the 1946 Australian federal election =

This article provides information on candidates who stood for the 1946 Australian federal election. The election was held on 28 September 1946.

In 1944–45, the United Australia Party (UAP) had reconstituted itself as the Liberal Party of Australia. Former UAP seats are now designated as Liberal seats.

== By-elections, appointments and defections ==
=== By-elections and appointments ===
- On 10 October 1944, Ted Mattner (UAP) was appointed a South Australian Senator to replace Oliver Uppill (UAP).
- On 18 August 1945, Kim Beazley (Labor) was elected to replace John Curtin (Labor) as the member for Fremantle.
- On 9 February 1946, Winton Turnbull (Country) was elected to replace Alexander Wilson (Independent) as the member for Wimmera.
- On 30 March 1946, Jo Gullett (Liberal) was elected to replace Arthur Coles (Independent) as the member for Henty.
- On 15 May 1946, Alexander Fraser (Country) was appointed a Victorian Senator to replace Richard Keane (Labor).
- On 14 August 1946, Jack Beasley (Labor), the member for West Sydney, resigned. The following day, Norman Makin (Labor), the member for Hindmarsh, also resigned. No by-elections were held due to the proximity of the election.

=== Defections ===
- In 1944, the United Australia Party was reconstituted as the Liberal Party of Australia. All former UAP members joined the new party.

== Retiring Members and Senators ==
=== Labor ===
- George Martens MP (Herbert, Qld)

=== Liberal ===
- Sir Frederick Stewart MP (Parramatta, NSW)
- Senator Thomas Crawford (Qld)
- Senator Harry Foll (Qld)
- Senator John Hayes (Tas)
- Senator James McLachlan (SA)

=== Country ===
- Senator William Gibson (Vic)

== House of Representatives ==
Sitting members at the time of the election are shown in bold text. Successful candidates are highlighted in the relevant colour. Where there is possible confusion, an asterisk (*) is also used.

=== New South Wales ===
Electorate	Held by	Labor candidate	Coalition candidate	Other candidates
Barton	Labor	**H. V. Evatt**	George Hohnen (Lib)	
Calare	Labor	**John Breen**	John Howse* (Lib); Harold Thorby (CP)	Madge Roberts (Ind)
Cook	Labor	**Tom Sheehan**	Frank Preacher (Lib)	Arthur Brittain (LL); Frederick Fairbrother (Ind); Lance Sharkey (CPA)
Cowper	Country	George Mitchell	**Sir Earle Page** (CP)	Richard Williams (Ind)
Dalley	Labor	**Sol Rosevear**	Leslie Webster (Lib)	Kenneth Falvey (LL)
Darling	Labor	**Joe Clark**	Greg McGirr (CP)	Cyril Glassop (PPP)
East Sydney	Labor	**Eddie Ward**	Ivan Dougherty (Lib)	Wal Campbell (PPP)
Eden-Monaro	Labor	**Allan Fraser**	Allan Backhouse (CP); Denzil Macarthur-Onslow (Lib); Pat Osborne (CP)	Victor Brown (SP)
Gwydir	Labor	**William Scully**	Thomas Mort (Lib); Thomas Treloar (CP)	William Campbell (PPP); Tom Carmody (SP); George McDonald (Ind); Kevin Nott (Ind); Ben Wade (Ind CP)
Hume	Labor	**Arthur Fuller**	Geoffrey Davey (Lib); Warren McDonald (CP)	
Hunter	Labor	**Rowley James**	Ted Fletcher (Lib)	John Cain (LL)
Lang	Labor	**Dan Mulcahy**	John Paget (Lib)	Sidney Bell (LL); Adam Ogston (CPA)
Macquarie	Labor	**Ben Chifley**	Eric Spooner (Lib); Cecil Williams (CP)	John Sutton (Ind)
Martin	Labor	**Fred Daly**	Frederick Jacobs (Lib)	
New England	Country	Leigh Cuthbertson	**Joe Abbott** (CP)	
Newcastle	Labor	**David Watkins**	Allen Fairhall (Lib)	Grahame Bland (SP); Arthur Clarke (SC); Edwin Dark (Ind); Stan Deacon (CPA); Charles Dicker (LL); Harry Ellis (SPA); Isabel Longworth (Ind); Frederick Wilson (Ind)
North Sydney	Liberal	Leo Haylen	**Billy Hughes** (Lib)	
Parkes	Labor	**Les Haylen**	Athol Richardson (Lib)	
Parramatta	Liberal	Dudley Jeffree	Howard Beale (Lib)	
Reid	Labor	**Charles Morgan**	Jeffrey Blaxland (Lib)	William Beckett (SP); Jack Lang* (LL)
Richmond	Country	Keith Compton	**Larry Anthony** (CP)	
Riverina	Labor	**Joe Langtry**	Christopher Lethbridge (Lib); Hugh Roberton (CP)	John Gosling (LL); William Pow (Ind)
Robertson	Labor	**Thomas Williams**	George Watkins (CP); Roy Wheeler (Lib)	Ian Grant (LL)
Warringah	Liberal	George Godfrey	**Percy Spender** (Lib)	
Watson	Labor	**Max Falstein**	Charles de Monchaux (Lib)	Wallace Knox (SP); Charles Wilson (PPP)
Wentworth	Liberal	Jessie Street	**Eric Harrison** (Lib)	Charles Walsh (LL)
Werriwa	Labor	**Bert Lazzarini**	Ray Watson (Lib)	Les Mullin (CPA)
West Sydney	Labor	William O'Connor	John Mant (Lib)	Malinda Ivey (Ind); Stan Moran (CPA); Thomas Ryan (LL); Ronald Sarina (PPP)

=== Northern Territory ===
Electorate	Held by	Labor candidate	Other candidates
Northern Territory	Independent	Bob Murray	**Adair Blain*** (Ind); Ralph Edwards (Ind); Leigh Wallman (Ind Lab)

=== Queensland ===
Electorate	Held by	Labor candidate	Coalition candidate	Services candidate	Other candidates
Brisbane	Labor	**George Lawson**	Geoffrey Ward (Lib)	Gordon Olive	
Capricornia	Labor	**Frank Forde**	Charles Davidson (Lib/CP)	Andrew Taylor	
Darling Downs	Country	William English	**Arthur Fadden** (CP)	Maxwell Owen	
Griffith	Labor	**William Conelan**	William Scott (Lib)	Arthur Chresby	
Herbert	Labor	Bill Edmonds	Lloyd Roberts (CP)	Alexander McNamee	Jack Henry (CPA); Joseph Pollard (Ind)
Kennedy	Labor	**Bill Riordan**	Clement Cummings (CP)		
Lilley	Labor	**Jim Hadley**	Charles Wilson (Lib)	George Mocatta	
Maranoa	Country	John Dufficy	**Charles Adermann** (CP)	John Walker	
Moreton	Liberal	Jack Perrett	**Josiah Francis** (Lib)	Charles McCormack	
Wide Bay	Country	George Watson	**Bernard Corser** (CP)	Eric Paterson	Max Julius (CPA)

=== South Australia ===
Electorate	Held by	Labor candidate	Liberal candidate	Other candidates
Adelaide	Labor	**Cyril Chambers**	Ian Hayward	Alf Watt (CPA)
Barker	Liberal	Harry Krantz	**Archie Cameron**	David Eddy (Ind)
Boothby	Labor	**Thomas Sheehy**	Keith Wilson	
Grey	Labor	**Edgar Russell**	Oliver Badman	
Hindmarsh	Labor	Albert Thompson	William Palmer	Alan Finger (CPA)
Wakefield	Labor	**Albert Smith**	Philip McBride	Frank Rieck (Ind)

=== Tasmania ===
Electorate	Held by	Labor candidate	Liberal candidate	Independent candidates
Bass	Labor	**Claude Barnard**	Harry Spotswood	John Orchard
Darwin	Liberal	Harold Kirkpatrick	**Dame Enid Lyons**	
Denison	Labor	**Frank Gaha**	Bruce Hamilton	
Franklin	Labor	**Charles Frost**	Bill Falkinder	
Wilmot	Liberal	Gil Duthie	**Allan Guy**	

=== Victoria ===
Electorate	Held by	Labor candidate	Coalition candidate	Other candidates
Balaclava	Liberal	Maurice Ashkanasy	**Thomas White** (Lib)	
Ballaarat	Labor	**Reg Pollard**	Arnold Caddy (Lib)	
Batman	Labor	**Frank Brennan**	John McColl (Lib)	Allan Brennan (Ind); George Oke (CPA)
Bendigo	Country	Ernest Duus	Joseph Hall (Lib); **George Rankin*** (CP)	
Bourke	Labor	**Bill Bryson**	Russell Stokes (Lib)	Doris Blackburn* (Ind Lab); Henry Brand (SP)
Corangamite	Liberal	Henry Stacpoole	**Allan McDonald** (Lib)	
Corio	Labor	**John Dedman**	Frederick Wallace (Lib)	Winifred West (Ind)
Deakin	Liberal	Arthur Smith	**William Hutchinson** (Lib)	
Fawkner	Liberal	Bill Bourke	**Harold Holt** (Lib)	Mascotte Brown (Ind); Harold Rettig (SP)
Flinders	Liberal	Frank Lee	**Rupert Ryan** (Lib)	
Gippsland	Country	Adam Keltie	**George Bowden** (CP)	Wally Williames (CPA)
Henty	Liberal	Val Doube	**Jo Gullett** (Lib)	
Indi	Country		**John McEwen** (CP)	John Chanter (Ind CP)
Kooyong	Liberal	Albert Nicholls	**Robert Menzies** (Lib)	Ted Laurie (CPA)
Maribyrnong	Labor	**Arthur Drakeford**	Adrian Cole (Lib)	
Melbourne	Labor	**Arthur Calwell**	Reg Cooper (Lib)	
Melbourne Ports	Labor	**Jack Holloway**	Douglas Dennis (Lib)	
Wannon	Labor	**Don McLeod**	Dan Mackinnon (Lib); Leonard Rodda (CP)	
Wimmera	Country	Alfred Loveridge	**Winton Turnbull** (CP)	
Yarra	Labor	**James Scullin**	Kenneth Bisney (Lib)	Ken Miller (CPA)

=== Western Australia ===
Electorate	Held by	Labor candidate	Coalition candidate	Other candidates
Forrest	Labor	**Nelson Lemmon**	James Cumming (Lib); Jasper Norton (CP)	
Fremantle	Labor	**Kim Beazley**	Claude Henderson (Lib)	
Kalgoorlie	Labor	**Herbert Johnson**	Seddon Vincent (Lib)	
Perth	Labor	**Tom Burke**	Jim Paton (Lib)	John Graham (SP); Kevin Healy (CPA); Robert Salter (Ind)
Swan	Labor	**Don Mountjoy**	Len Hamilton (CP)	Bill Grayden (Ind)

== Senate ==
Sitting Senators are shown in bold text. Tickets that elected at least one Senator are highlighted in the relevant colour. Successful candidates are identified by an asterisk (*).

=== New South Wales ===
Three seats were up for election. The Labor Party was defending three seats. Labor Senators Stan Amour, John Armstrong and Donald Grant were not up for re-election.

Labor candidates	Coalition candidates	PPP candidates	Ungrouped candidates
1. **Bill Ashley***; 2. **James Arnold***; 3. **William Large***	1. Alexander Mair (Lib); 2. Albert Reid (CP); 3. Maurice Fergusson (Lib)	1. George Durrance; 2. Thomas Fleming; 3. Dorothy Rogerson	Alexander Alexander; Michael Satwell; Louis Phillips; Edith Cook

=== Queensland ===
Three seats were up for election. The Liberal-Country Coalition was defending three seats. Labor Senators Gordon Brown, Joe Collings and Ben Courtice were not up for re-election.

Labor candidates	Coalition candidates	Services candidates
1. Harry Boland; 2. George Burns; 3. Tom Rasey	1. **Walter Cooper*** (CP); 2. Neil O'Sullivan* (Lib); 3. Annabelle Rankin* (Lib)	1. George Cameron; 2. Cranston McEachern; 3. Winifred Payne

=== South Australia ===
Three seats were up for election. The Liberal Party was defending three seats. Labor Senators Alex Finlay, Theo Nicholls and Sid O'Flaherty were not up for re-election.

Labor candidates	Liberal candidates
1. Fred Beerworth*; 2. Jack Critchley*; 3. Frederick Ward*	1. **George McLeay**; 2. **Ted Mattner**; 3. James Murdoch

=== Tasmania ===
Three seats were up for election. The Liberal Party was defending three seats. Labor Senators Bill Aylett, Charles Lamp and Nick McKenna were not up for re-election.

Labor candidates	Liberal candidates	Ungrouped candidates
1. Reg Murray*; 2. Bill Morrow*; 3. Justin O'Byrne*; 4. William Ritchie	1. Arthur Beck; 2. **Herbert Hays**; 3. **Burford Sampson**	Neil Burbury

=== Victoria ===
Four seats were up for election. One of these was a short-term vacancy caused by Labor Senator Richard Keane's death; this had been filled in the interim by the Country Party's Alexander Fraser. The Liberal-Country Coalition was defending three seats. The Labor Party was defending one seat. Labor Senators Don Cameron and Jim Sheehan were not up for re-election.

Labor candidates	Coalition candidates
1. Bert Hendrickson*; 2. Charles Sandford*; 3. Fred Katz*; 4. Jack Devlin*	1. **Charles Brand** (Lib); 2. **Alexander Fraser** (CP); 3. **John Leckie** (Lib); 4. William Moss (CP)

=== Western Australia ===
Three seats were up for election. The Liberal Party was defending two seats. The Labor Party was defending one seat. Labor Senators Robert Clothier, James Fraser and Richard Nash were not up for re-election.

Labor candidates	Coalition candidates	Ungrouped candidates
1. **Dorothy Tangney***; 2. John Harris*; 3. Joe Cooke*	1. **Herbert Collett** (Lib); 2. Ignatius Boyle (CP); 3. **Allan MacDonald** (Lib)	Claude Swaine; Oliver Strang

== Summary by party ==
Beside each party is the candidates put forward by that party in the House of Representatives for each state, as well as an indication of whether the party contested Senate elections in each state.

Party	NSW		Vic		Qld		WA		SA		Tas		Total	
Party	HR	S	HR	S	HR	S	HR	S	HR	S	HR	S	HR	S
Australian Labor Party	28	*	19	*	10	*	5	*	6	*	5	*	73	6
Liberal Party of Australia	24	*	17	*	5	*	4	*	6	*	5	*	61	6
Australian Country Party	11	*	5	*	5	*	2	*					23	4
Services Party of Australia	6		2		10	*	1						19	1
Communist Party of Australia	5		4		2		1		2				14	
Lang Labor	10												10	
Protestant People's Party	5	*											5	1
Douglas Credit Party	1												1	
Independent and other	12	*	5		1		2	*	2		1	*	23	3

== See also ==
- 1946 Australian federal election
- Members of the Australian House of Representatives, 1943–1946
- Members of the Australian House of Representatives, 1946–1949
- Members of the Australian Senate, 1944–1947
- Members of the Australian Senate, 1947–1950
- List of political parties in Australia
