= Electoral results for the Division of Bourke =

Australian division election results

This is a list of electoral results for the Division of Bourke in Australian federal elections from the division's creation in 1901 until its abolition in 1949.

== Members ==
Member	Party	Term
James Hume Cook	Protectionist	1901–1909
James Hume Cook	Liberal	1909–1910
Frank Anstey	Labor	1910–1934
Maurice Blackburn	Labor	1934–1935
Maurice Blackburn	Independent Labor	1935–1937
Maurice Blackburn	Labor	1937–1941
Maurice Blackburn	Independent Labor	1941–1943
Bill Bryson	Labor	1943–1946
Doris Blackburn	Independent Labor	1946–1947
Doris Blackburn	Blackburn-Mutton Labor	1947–1949

== Election results ==
=== Elections in the 1940s ===
==== 1946 ====
1946 Australian federal election: Bourke
Party	Candidate	Votes	%	±%
Labor	Bill Bryson	30,620	45.4	+7.7
Independent Labor	Doris Blackburn	18,625	27.6	+27.6
Liberal	Russell Stokes	16,889	25.0	+6.7
Services	Henry Brand	1,333	2.0	+2.0
Total formal votes		67,467	96.6	
Informal votes		2,342	3.4	
Turnout		69,809	93.3	
Two-party-preferred result
Independent Labor	Doris Blackburn	34,478	51.1	+4.7
Labor	Bill Bryson	32,989	48.9	−4.7
Independent Labor gain from Labor		Swing	+4.7	

==== 1943 ====
1943 Australian federal election: Bourke
Party	Candidate	Votes	%	±%
Independent Labor	Maurice Blackburn	26,494	40.4	+40.4
Labor	Bill Bryson	24,722	37.7	−28.5
United Australia	David Smith	12,004	18.3	−15.5
Independent	John March	2,404	3.7	+3.7
Total formal votes		65,624	97.8	
Informal votes		1,468	2.2	
Turnout		67,092	96.6	
Two-party-preferred result
Labor	Bill Bryson	35,162	53.6	−12.6
Independent Labor	Maurice Blackburn	30,462	46.4	+46.4
Labor hold		Swing	−12.6	

==== 1940 ====
1940 Australian federal election: Bourke
Party	Candidate	Votes	%	±%
Labor	Maurice Blackburn	39,736	66.2	−1.9
United Australia	Charles Lucas	20,278	33.8	+1.9
Total formal votes		60,014	97.8	
Informal votes		1,364	2.2	
Turnout		61,378	95.2	
Labor hold		Swing	−1.9	

=== Elections in the 1930s ===
==== 1937 ====
1937 Australian federal election: Bourke
Party	Candidate	Votes	%	±%
Labor	Maurice Blackburn	38,793	68.1	+8.4
United Australia	Richard Griffiths	18,162	31.9	−2.6
Total formal votes		56,955	97.5	
Informal votes		1,460	2.5	
Turnout		58,415	96.7	
Labor hold		Swing	+3.2	

==== 1934 ====
1934 Australian federal election: Bourke
Party	Candidate	Votes	%	±%
Labor	Maurice Blackburn	35,728	60.1	+12.4
United Australia	Henry Stubbs	20,176	34.0	−11.2
Communist	Robert McCrae	3,509	5.9	+3.0
Total formal votes		59,413	96.2	
Informal votes		2,338	3.8	
Turnout		61,751	95.6	
Two-party-preferred result
Labor	Maurice Blackburn		65.6	+14.5
United Australia	Henry Stubbs		34.4	−14.5
Labor hold		Swing	+14.5	

==== 1931 ====
1931 Australian federal election: Bourke
Party	Candidate	Votes	%	±%
Labor	Frank Anstey	26,948	47.7	−29.7
United Australia	Roy Ivey	25,572	45.2	+22.6
Independent	Walter Norman	2,357	4.2	+4.2
Communist	James Adie	1,644	2.9	+2.9
Total formal votes		56,521	95.4	
Informal votes		2,731	4.6	
Turnout		59,252	97.3	
Two-party-preferred result
Labor	Frank Anstey	28,897	51.1	−26.3
United Australia	Roy Ivey	27,624	48.9	+26.3
Labor hold		Swing	−26.3	

=== Elections in the 1920s ===
==== 1929 ====
1929 Australian federal election: Bourke
Party	Candidate	Votes	%	±%
Labor	Frank Anstey	43,714	77.4	+8.7
Nationalist	Lionel Hahn	12,763	22.6	−8.7
Total formal votes		56,477	98.4	
Informal votes		913	1.6	
Turnout		57,390	96.5	
Labor hold		Swing	+8.7	

==== 1928 ====
1928 Australian federal election: Bourke
Party	Candidate	Votes	%	±%
Labor	Frank Anstey	36,835	68.7	+6.2
Nationalist	Leonard Smith	16,797	31.3	−6.2
Total formal votes		53,632	95.9	
Informal votes		2,276	4.1	
Turnout		55,908	95.5	
Labor hold		Swing	+6.2	

==== 1925 ====
1925 Australian federal election: Bourke
Party	Candidate	Votes	%	±%
Labor	Frank Anstey	32,325	62.5	−7.6
Nationalist	Edward Price	19,399	37.5	+7.6
Total formal votes		51,724	98.7	
Informal votes		703	1.3	
Turnout		52,427	94.7	
Labor hold		Swing	−7.6	

==== 1922 ====
1922 Australian federal election: Bourke
Party	Candidate	Votes	%	±%
Labor	Frank Anstey	17,068	70.1	+11.0
Nationalist	John March	7,290	29.9	−11.0
Total formal votes		24,358	97.6	
Informal votes		588	2.4	
Turnout		24,946	53.4	
Labor hold		Swing	+11.0	

=== Elections in the 1910s ===
==== 1919 ====
1919 Australian federal election: Bourke
Party	Candidate	Votes	%	±%
Labor	Frank Anstey	21,359	53.2	−1.3
Nationalist	Reginald Tracey	18,814	46.8	+1.3
Total formal votes		40,173	99.0	
Informal votes		390	1.0	
Turnout		40,563	76.0	
Labor hold		Swing	−1.3	

==== 1917 ====
1917 Australian federal election: Bourke
Party	Candidate	Votes	%	±%
Labor	Frank Anstey	22,814	54.5	−11.4
Nationalist	Arthur May	19,033	45.5	+11.4
Total formal votes		41,847	98.6	
Informal votes		596	1.4	
Turnout		42,443	83.5	
Labor hold		Swing	−11.4	

==== 1914 ====
1914 Australian federal election: Bourke
Party	Candidate	Votes	%	±%
Labor	Frank Anstey	22,075	65.9	+5.9
Liberal	Richard Jennings	11,407	34.1	−5.9
Total formal votes		33,482	98.3	
Informal votes		583	1.7	
Turnout		34,065	76.3	
Labor hold		Swing	+5.9	

==== 1913 ====
1913 Australian federal election: Bourke
Party	Candidate	Votes	%	±%
Labor	Frank Anstey	19,225	60.0	+0.8
Liberal	Frank Maldon Robb	12,806	40.0	−0.8
Total formal votes		32,031	98.7	
Informal votes		421	1.3	
Turnout		32,452	76.9	
Labor hold		Swing	+0.8	

==== 1910 ====
1910 Australian federal election: Bourke
Party	Candidate	Votes	%	±%
Labour	Frank Anstey	17,918	58.6	+19.7
Liberal	James Hume Cook	12,660	41.4	−19.7
Total formal votes		30,578	98.8	
Informal votes		381	1.2	
Turnout		30,959	75.4	
Labour gain from Liberal		Swing	+15.3	

=== Elections in the 1900s ===
==== 1906 ====
1906 Australian federal election: Bourke
Party	Candidate	Votes	%	±%
Protectionist	James Hume Cook	10,745	52.2	+9.8
Labour	Randolph Bedford	8,016	38.9	+0.1
Anti-Socialist	Joseph Molden	1,835	8.9	+8.9
Total formal votes		20,596	97.1	
Informal votes		624	2.9	
Turnout		21,220	63.1	
Protectionist hold		Swing	+4.9	

==== 1903 ====
1903 Australian federal election: Bourke
Party	Candidate	Votes	%	±%
Protectionist	James Hume Cook	8,657	42.4	+7.8
Labour	Martin Hannah	7,933	38.8	+21.1
Ind. Protectionist	Rothwell Grundy	3,841	18.8	+18.8
Total formal votes		20,431	98.5	
Informal votes		314	1.5	
Turnout		20,745	59.4	
Protectionist hold		Swing	−2.1	

==== 1901 ====
1901 Australian federal election: Bourke
Party	Candidate	Votes	%	±%
Protectionist	James Hume Cook	3,021	34.6	+34.6
Free Trade	Frederick Hickford	2,343	26.8	+26.8
Labour	Martin Hannah	1,559	17.8	+17.8
Ind. Protectionist	James Rose	1,138	13.0	+13.0
Ind. Protectionist	James Mirams	676	7.7	+7.7
Total formal votes		8,737	99.0	
Informal votes		87	1.0	
Turnout		8,824	66.1	
Protectionist win		(new seat)		
