= Cranston McEachern =

- Military career
- Allegiance: Australia
- Branch: Citizen Military Forces; Second Australian Imperial Force
- Service years: 1924–1946
- Rank: Brigadier
- Commands: 2/4th Anti-Tank Regiment; 11th Field Brigade
- Conflicts: Second World War
- Awards: Distinguished Service Order; Efficiency Decoration; Mentioned in Despatches

Brigadier Cranston Albury McEachern, DSO, ED (9 September 1905 – 15 October 1983) was an Australian Army officer and solicitor.

== Early life ==
McEachern was born at Dongara in Western Australia to tailor Archibald Hector Cranston McEachern and Lillian Emma, née Dumbrell. He attended Brisbane Grammar School and was admitted as a solicitor on 2 May 1928, establishing his own firm. He joined the Australian Field Artillery militia in 1924 and by 1936 was a major commanding the 11th Field Brigade. He married Clarice Jean Lynagh Smith on 24 April 1936 at Brisbane, but they separated in January 1940 and were subsequently divorced. McEachern remarried clerk Hazel Lawson Lyon on 17 October 1940 in Brisbane. He was promoted lieutenant colonel in February 1937.

== Second World War ==
After the outbreak of the Second World War, McEachern gave up his law firm and joined the Second Australian Imperial Force on 1 May 1940 as a major. In October 1940 he was again promoted lieutenant colonel and was given command of the 2/4th Anti-Tank Regiment, which was sent to Malaya with the 8th Division. Fighting against the Japanese from 27 December 1941, the unit was still in place at the surrender on 15 February 1942; McEachern's superior officer reported that he was "an inspiration to his Regiment owing to his outstanding ability, command and control which were exercised without regard for personal safety"; he would receive the Distinguished Service Order for his actions in 1947.

As a prisoner of war, McEachern commanded "D" force, which was sent to work on the Burma-Thailand Railway in March 1943. Promoted colonel and temporary brigadier from April 1942, he commanded 5000 Australian and British troops on the railway. He was the senior Allied officer in Thailand at the Japanese surrender in August 1945 and oversaw the repatriation of 30,000 troops. He overstepped his authority to countermand Allied officers to concentrate prisoners in the Bangkok area as he knew many prisoners would not survive the long march. Mentioned in despatches, he was formally transferred to the Reserve of Officers on 19 February 1946 as an honorary brigadier.

== Later life ==
Cranston McEachern & Co. became a major law firm when McEachern returned from the war. He stood as a Senate candidate for the Services Party of Australia at the 1946 federal election, and was president of the Queensland branch of the United Service Institute from 1946 to 1961. From 1964 to 1969 he was president of the Young Men's Christian Association of Brisbane and from 1966 to 1970 was honorary colonel of the Australian Cadet Corps, Northern Command. He died in 1983 at Bridgeman Downs in Brisbane, survived by his wife, a son from his first marriage, and three children from his second.
