= Gordon Olive =

Australian air force officer

Charles Gordon Chaloner Olive
- Born: 3 July 1916; Paddington, Queensland
- Died: 20 October 1987 (aged 71); Boonah, Queensland
- Military career
- Allegiance: Australia; United Kingdom
- Branch: Royal Australian Air Force; Royal Air Force
- Service years: 1936–1946
- Rank: Wing Commander
- Commands: No. 101 Fighter Control Unit (1944–45); No. 456 Squadron RAAF (1941–42)
- Conflicts: Second World War; Dunkirk evacuation; Battle of Britain; South West Pacific theatre
- Awards: Commander of the Order of the British Empire; Distinguished Flying Cross
- Other work: Business executive

Charles Gordon Chaloner Olive, CBE, DFC (3 July 1916 – 20 October 1987) was an Australian air force officer who became a fighter ace in the Battle of Britain, flying the Supermarine Spitfire. Returning home after the war, we was a company manager and local organizer in Brisbane.

== Early life and career ==
Olive was born at Paddington in Brisbane to New Zealand-born clerk Hugh Chaloner Olive and Lucinda Maud, née Exley. After attending Brisbane Grammar School and, briefly, the University of Queensland, he enlisted in the Royal Australian Air Force as a cadet in January 1936, studying at Point Cook in Victoria. He became a pilot in December 1936 and in January 1937 went to England on a commission with the Royal Air Force. He served as a pilot officer with the No. 2 Flying Training School, and on 22 May 1937 was transferred to the No. 65 Squadron's Hornchurch Wing. Promoted flying officer on 19 August 1938, he became a flight commander at the outbreak of the Second World War.

== Second World War ==
Olive piloted a Spitfire on 193 sorties over three tours of duty between September 1939 and March 1941, and was slightly wounded while patrolling during the Dunkirk evacuation. He destroyed at least five enemy aircraft during the Battle of Britain and on 19 August 1940 was promoted flight lieutenant, winning the Distinguished Flying Cross on 24 September.

He married Helen Mary Thomas on 22 June 1940 at Kensington in London; she went to Australia in 1943, one of the first English war brides to do so, but died in 1946.

Olive shot down his sixth enemy aircraft in December 1940, and in June 1941 was appointed to command the No. 456 Squadron, Australia's first and only night-fighter squadron. He was promoted squadron leader on 18 January 1942 but was forced off active service due to ill health in March. In June 1943 he joined the Royal Australian Air Force officially, but he remained attached to the RAF.

In October 1943 he returned to Australia and in February 1944 joined RAAF Command, becoming acting wing commander on 1 April. On 29 December he took over command of No. 101 Fighter Control Unit, moving to Air Defence Headquarters in Sydney in January 1944.

From 16 July 1945 he was posted to Air Defence Headquarters in Morotai, Indonesia, and he was demobilised and transferred to the Reserve on 7 March 1946. He was state commandant of the Air Training Corps from 1948.

== Business executive and politics ==
Olive became an executive with Rheem Australia Ltd and later Boral, and also completed several wartime paintings. After the death of his first wife, he married Beryl Gwendoline North on 17 April 1948.

He ran for the seat of Brisbane as a Services Party candidate in the 1946 federal election, without success. He was honorary aide-de-camp to the Queen in 1961 and stood for the seat of Petrie as a Country Party candidate in 1972. He was appointed Member of the Order of the British Empire in 1967 and Commander in 1978, before retiring in 1981.

He died at Boonah in 1987 and was survived by his wife and three of his four children.

== Posthumous book ==
Olive had written notes for a book about his wartime service, but did not finish it. Several years after his death, his estate arranged for writer Dennis Newton to edit these notes into a book, which was published in 2015 under the title Spitfire Ace.
