= Dongara, Western Australia =

Dongara
- Town
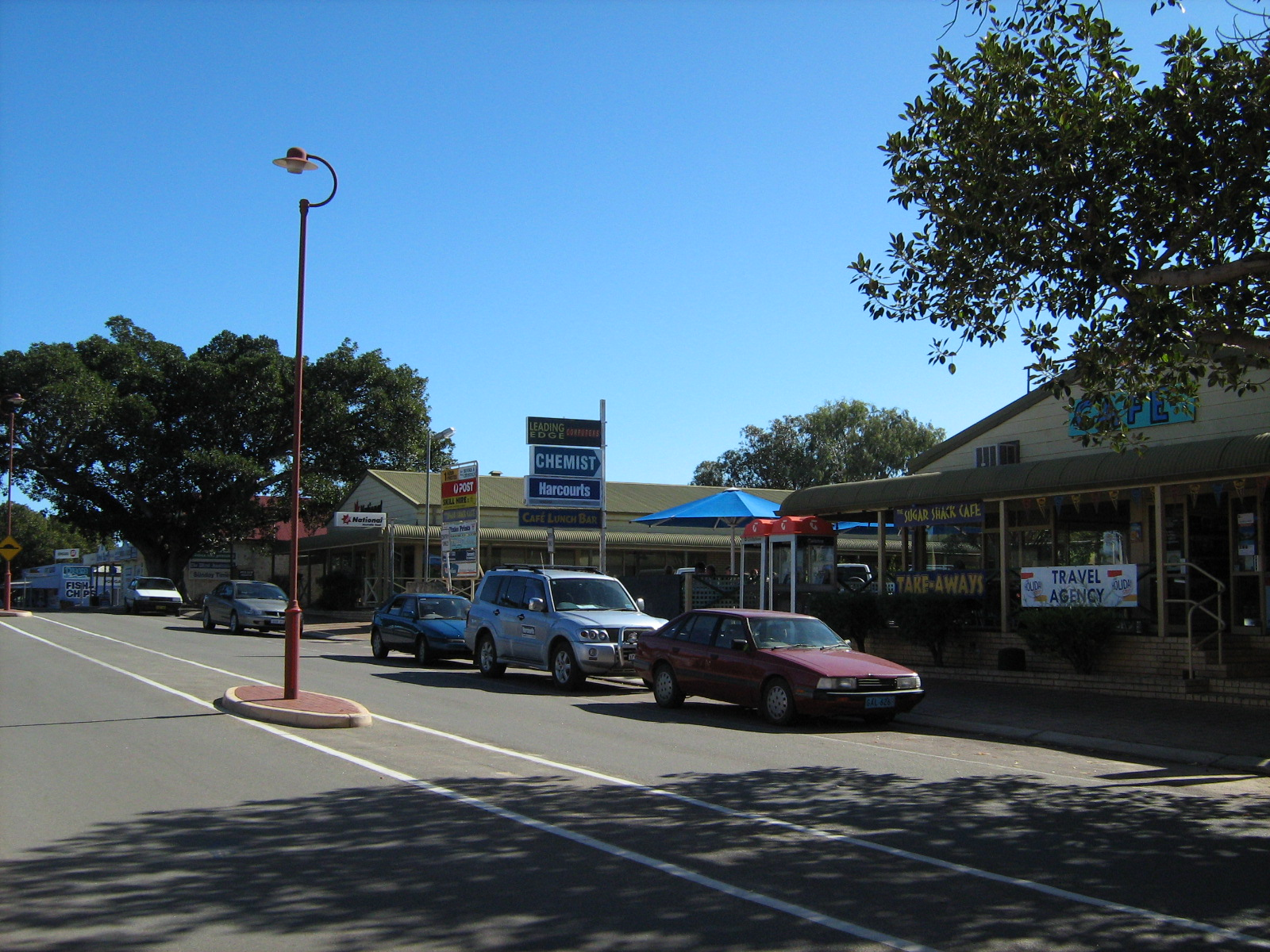
- Main Street of Dongara – Moreton Terrace

- Interactive map of Dongara
- Coordinates: 29.251°S 114.934°E
- Country: Australia
- State: Western Australia
- LGA: Shire of Irwin
- Location: 351 km (218 mi) NNW of Perth; 61 km (38 mi) S of Geraldton
- Established: 1871

Government
  - State electorate: Moore
  - Federal division: Durack

Area
  - Total: 8.3 km^{2} (3.2 sq mi)
- Elevation: 34 m (112 ft)

Population
  - Total: 1,393 (SAL 2021)
- Postcode: 6525

Dongara is a town 351 kilometres (218 mi) north-northwest of Perth, Western Australia on the Brand Highway. The town is located at the mouth of the Irwin River. The area is marketed as the 'Rock lobster capital of Australia'.

Dongara is the seat of the Shire of Irwin. At the 2016 census the shire had a population of 3,569, with 2,782 residing in the contiguous towns of Dongara and Port Denison.

== History ==
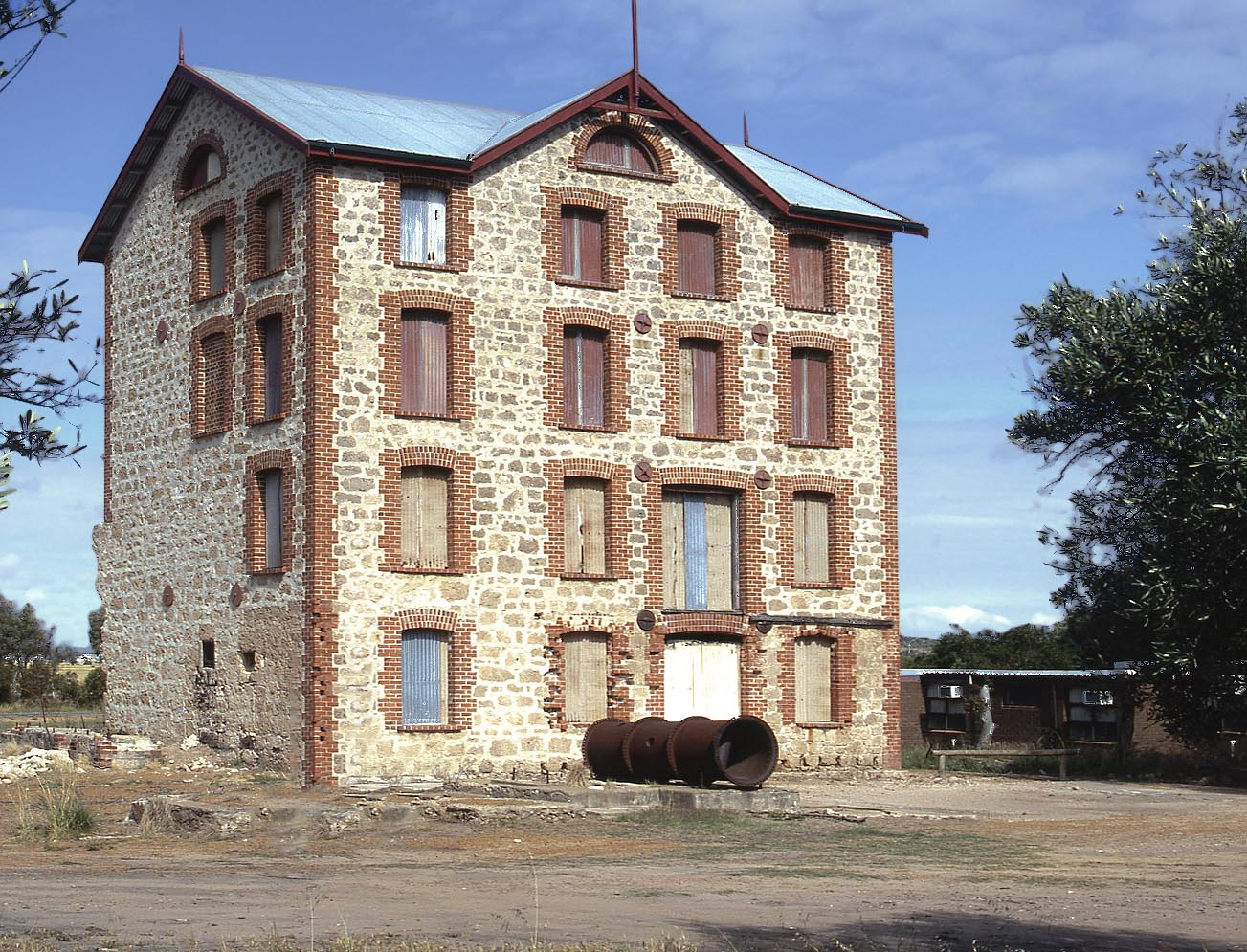
Dongara Flour Mill

The place name 'Dongara' is an anglicised rendition of Thung-arra, the local Wattandee people's name for the estuary adjacent to the town, meaning 'sea lion place'.

European settlement around the estuary began in 1853 when a harbourmaster, Edward Downes, was stationed there to look out for passing ships. He was employed by Lockier Burges, Edward Hamersley, Samuel Pole Phillips and Bartholomew Urban Vigors' Cattle Company, which was granted 60,000 acres of pastoral leases about 15 kilometres inland. By the 1860s, ex-convict small farmers were occupying the local river flats, and a flour mill (the Irwin or Smith's Mill) was operating. A townsite was surveyed, and in 1871 it became the seat of a local council established that year (now the Irwin Shire Council), and site of a police station and public school. The Anglican Church of St John the Baptist and a Methodist Church were built in the 1880s.

In the 1890s, the larger Royal Steam Roller Flour Mill was built on the flats next to the new Midland Railway line that connected the district to Perth. The town slowly developed, and although still a comparatively small village by the time of Federation in 1901, it had several churches, municipal offices and hall, a variety of shops, two hotels, a public school and a railway station. The nearby localities were populated by wheat and sheep farmers, centred on the hamlets of Bookara, Irwin and Strawberry. There was also a small population of fishermen, including several Chinese men, at Port Denison.

Dongara is the centre for a small oil and natural gas industry that began with the discovery of the Dongara Gas Field in 1966.

Dongara railway station was demolished in 1975 as part of the realignment of the Midland railway line through the town, which was necessitated by the construction of the Dongara–Eneabba railway line. The new alignment was 0.9 kilometres (0.6 mi) shorter than the original alignment and it opened on 1 June 1975. The route of the Dongara–Eneabba railway line travelled through the Dongara Roman Catholic Cemetery, located on the southern side of Brand Highway, so the remains there were re-interred in the Dongara Cemetery. The Dongara–Eneabba railway line opened in April 1976.

== Notable people from or associated with Dongara ==
- Sir David Brand (1912–1979), 19th Premier of Western Australia, born at Dongara
- Nathan Broad (1993– ), Australian rules footballer and 3 time AFL premiership player
- Robert Bruning (1928–2008), born Robert Bell, PMG linesman, sales manager, actor, film producer, screenwriter, script editor
- Jamie Elliott (1992– ), Australian rules footballer
- Patricia Kailis (1933–2020), geneticist, lived in Dongara from 1962 to 1969
- Carmen Lawrence (1948- ), 25th Premier of Western Australia
- Cranston Albury McEachern (1905–1983), Australian army officer and solicitor
- Jaeger O'Meara (1994– ), Australian rules footballer
- Roxanne Roux, AFLW player
