= Hugh Robertson =

Hugh Robertson may refer to:

- Hugh Robertson (basketball) (born 1989), American basketball player
- Hugh Robertson (instrument maker) (1730–1822), Scottish instrument maker
- Hugh Robertson (1890s footballer), Scottish footballer for Burnley, Lincoln City, Leicester Fosse
- Hugh Robertson (footballer, born 1939) (1939–2010), Scottish footballer
- Hugh Robertson (footballer, born 1975), Scottish footballer
- Hugh Robertson (businessman) (born 1962), British businessman and politician
- Hugh A. Robertson (1932–1988), American film director and editor
- Hugh C. Robertson (1845–1908), American studio potter

== See also ==
- Hugh Roberton (disambiguation)
