= Dongara–Eneabba railway line =

Railway line in Western Australia

Overview
- Status: Closed
- Owner: Westrail (1976–2000); WestNet Rail / Brookfield Rail / Arc Infrastructure (leased from the Public Transport Authority since 2000)
- Locale: Mid West, Western Australia
- Termini: Dongara; Eneabba

Service
- Operator(s): Westrail (1976–2000); Australian Railroad Group (2000–2011); QR National (2011–2013)

History
- Opened: 20 April 1976
- Closed: February 2013

Technical
- Line length: 94 km (58 mi)
- Number of tracks: 1
- Track gauge: 1,067 mm (3 ft 6 in) narrow gauge

The Dongara–Eneabba railway line is a disused railway line in the Mid West region of Western Australia. It branches off the Midland railway line at Dongara and runs for 94 kilometres (58 mi) to Eneabba. It opened in 1976 and closed in 2013, and was solely used to haul mineral sands from a mine at Eneabba to Geraldton Port.

== Description ==
The Dongara–Eneabba railway line was constructed with a 1,067 mm (3 ft 6 in) track gauge, conforming with Western Australia's narrow gauge network. The ruling gradient is 1 in 200 and the rail weight is 40 kilograms per metre (81 lb/yd). The line is 94 kilometres (58 mi) long. The town of Eneabba is at the 80-kilometre (50 mi) mark and the town of Arrowsmith is at the 42-kilometre (26 mi) mark. The alignment roughly parallels Brand Highway. Half the route travels through privately held farmland and half travels through crown land. The line crosses the Irwin River and the Arrowsmith River.

== History ==
=== Construction ===
The construction of the railway was triggered by the discovery of substantial deposits of mineral sands near Eneabba. It was also envisioned that the railway could haul grain, livestock, oil, and superphosphate. It was planned that there would be six return trips per week, using WAGR D class locomotives hauling hopper cars.

The Parliament of Western Australia passed the Dongara–Eneabba Railway Act in 1974, and it was given royal assent on 23 October 1974. The railway was constructed and owned by the Western Australian Government Railways (renamed in 1975 to Westrail).

Earthworks commenced in February 1975. During the construction of the Dongara–Eneabba railway line, the Midland railway line was realigned through Dongara, causing the demolition of the Dongara railway station, which had been built in 1894 by Gustave Liebe. The new alignment was 0.9 kilometres (0.6 mi) shorter than the original alignment and it opened on 1 June 1975. The route of the Dongara–Eneabba railway line travelled through the Dongara Roman Catholic Cemetery, located on the southern side of Brand Highway, so the remains there were re-interred in the Dongara Cemetery.

The Dongara–Eneabba railway line opened to traffic on 20 April 1976, but it was officially opened by the premier of Western Australia, Charles Court, on 30 April 1976.

=== Potential extension to Gingin ===
In 1982, a report was released analysing the potential to extend the railway line south to Gingin, a distance of 200 kilometres (120 mi). This would have shortened the distance by rail between Perth and Geraldton by 61 kilometres (38 mi), bypassing much of the Midland railway line and allowing for a lower ruling gradient. The estimated cost of this was $25.25 million in 1980, or $122 million in 2022. The report analysed seven potential routes that could use the extension:

- Western Ti Mineral Sands from Eneabba to Capel
- CRA Bauxite from Chittering Valley to Geraldton
- Allied Eneabba–Bauxite from Eneabba to Narngulu
- Allied Eneabba Coal from Capel to Narngulu
- CRA Coal from Collie to Geraldton
- Western Ti Coal from Capel to Eneabba
- Other traffics from Kewdale to Geraldton and vice versa

The report concluded that the extension would be viable if "other traffics", Western Ti Mineral Sands and at least one other project got underway.

=== Privatisation and closure ===
In December 2000, Westrail's freight operations and a 49-year lease of Westrail's freight network, including the Dongara–Eneabba railway line, was sold to Australian Railroad Group (ARG), a joint venture between Wesfarmers and Genesee & Wyoming. ARG set up a subsidiary, WestNet Rail, to manage the below-rail operations. In February 2006, it was announced that ARG would sell WestNet Rail to Babcock & Brown, and the above-rail operations would be sold to Queensland Rail. Babcock & Brown Infrastructure was renamed Prime Infrastructure in October 2009, and in 2010, the company merged with Brookfield Infrastructure Partners. In August 2011, WestNet Rail was rebranded Brookfield Rail, and in July 2017, Brookfield Rail was rebranded as Arc Infrastructure.

Services were suspended in September 2010 and resumed in January 2012 due to a revival of the mine. The final train ran on the Dongara–Eneabba railway line in February 2013, coinciding with the mothballing of the mine. As of 2018, the level crossings along the railway line still retain their flashing lights. Major roads that cross the railway include Brand Highway, Indian Ocean Drive and Kailis Drive.
