= Warren McDonald =

Sir Warren D'arcy McDonald KBE (23 December 1901 – 12 November 1965) was an Australian engineer, industrialist, soldier and banker.

McDonald was born at Penguin, Tasmania to building contractor Warren Patrick McDonald and Christina Louise Gaffney. He grew up in Strahan and was educated at Hadspen State School before winning a scholarship to Launceston Church Grammar School. He gained another scholarship, this time to the University of Tasmania, at the age of 17 but worked as a cadet-engineer with the Tasmanian Hydro-Electric Department until he could take up the scholarship at 18. Having found his vocation, he relinquished his place (having intended to study medicine) and in 1925 moved to Camperdown, Victoria.

Called to supervise residential construction in Canberra, McDonald moved to the capital permanently. He married tailoress Christina Helen Sullivan on 14 December 1927 at St Patrick's Catholic Church in Sydney, and later that year won the contract for the section of the Federal Highway from Canberra to Goulburn. He took over the family business in 1936 after his father's death and in 1948 established McDonald Industries Limited.

Following the outbreak of World War II, McDonald enlisted in the militia on 5 October 1939 as a sapper. He was commissioned in the Australian Imperial Force in January 1940 and sent to the Middle East with the 7th Divisional Engineers, being promoted to lieutenant colonel in March 1942 and serving as chief engineer in the Papua campaign. He was temporary brigadier of the II Corps in Bougainville from June to October 1945 before transferring to the Reserve of Officers on 7 December. He was mentioned in dispatches in 1947.

McDonald ran unsuccessfully for the Country Party in the 1946 federal election, a fact which did not prevent the Chifley government appointing him to advise the prices commissioner in 1947. The Menzies government appointed him to the Australian National Airlines Commission in 1952, operator of Trans Australia Airlines, of which he was chairman by February 1957. In 1959 he became the first chairman of the Commonwealth Bank, and strongly supported further development of northern Australia and increasing and broadening Australian exports.

McDonald served on the council of the Australian National University from 1953 to 1964 and was important in the foundation of the National Heart Foundation, of which he was first president (1959–64); the Foundation honours him with the Warren McDonald Research Fellowship. McDonald was a keen sportsman who represented the Australian Capital Territory in cricket and Australian rules football. He was appointed Commander of the Order of the British Empire in 1957 and elevated to Knight in 1964. He died at Lewisham in Sydney in 1965 of cerebral thrombosis and is buried in Canberra.

Business positions
Vacant Title last held by Claude Reading	Chairman of the Commonwealth Bank; 1960 – 1965	Succeeded by Geoffrey Rushworth as Acting Chairman
