= Hugh Roberton =

Hugh Roberton may refer to:

- Sir Hugh S. Roberton (composer) (1874–1952), Scottish composer and choral conductor
- Hugh Roberton (politician) (1900–1987), Scottish-born Australian MP and foundation member for the National Party of Australia

== See also ==
- Hugh Robertson (disambiguation)
