= Members of the Australian House of Representatives, 1946–1949 =

This is a list of the members of the Australian House of Representatives in the 18th Australian Parliament, which was elected at the 1946 election on 28 September 1946. The incumbent Australian Labor Party led by Prime Minister of Australia Ben Chifley defeated the newly formed opposition Liberal Party of Australia (descended from the United Australia Party) led by its founder Robert Menzies with coalition partner the Country Party led by Arthur Fadden.

Member	Party	Electorate	State	In office
Joe Abbott	Country	New England	NSW	1940–1949
Charles Adermann	Country	Maranoa	Qld	1943–1972
Larry Anthony	Country	Richmond	NSW	1937–1957
Claude Barnard	Labor	Bass	Tas	1934–1949
Howard Beale	Liberal	Parramatta	NSW	1946–1958
Kim Beazley	Labor	Fremantle	WA	1945–1977
Doris Blackburn	Independent	Bourke	Vic	1946–1949
Adair Blain	Independent	Northern Territory	NT	1934–1949
George Bowden	Country	Gippsland	Vic	1943–1961
Frank Brennan	Labor	Batman	Vic	1911–1931, 1934–1949
Tom Burke	Labor	Perth	WA	1943–1955
Arthur Calwell	Labor	Melbourne	Vic	1940–1972
Archie Cameron	Liberal	Barker	SA	1934–1956
Cyril Chambers	Labor	Adelaide	SA	1943–1958
Ben Chifley	Labor	Macquarie	NSW	1928–1931, 1940–1951
Joe Clark	Labor	Darling	NSW	1934–1969
William Conelan	Labor	Griffith	Qld	1939–1949
Bernard Corser	Country	Wide Bay	Qld	1928–1954
Fred Daly	Labor	Martin	NSW	1943–1975
Charles Davidson	Country	Capricornia	Qld	1946–1963
John Dedman	Labor	Corio	Vic	1940–1949
Arthur Drakeford	Labor	Maribyrnong	Vic	1934–1955
Gil Duthie	Labor	Wilmot	Tas	1946–1975
Bill Edmonds	Labor	Herbert	Qld	1946–1958
H.V. Evatt	Labor	Barton	NSW	1940–1960
Arthur Fadden	Country	Darling Downs	Qld	1936–1958
Bill Falkinder	Liberal	Franklin	Tas	1946–1966
Max Falstein	Labor	Watson	NSW	1940–1949
Josiah Francis	Liberal	Moreton	Qld	1922–1955
Allan Fraser	Labor	Eden-Monaro	NSW	1943–1966, 1969–1972
Arthur Fuller	Labor	Hume	NSW	1943–1949, 1951–1955, 1961–1963
Frank Gaha	Labor	Denison	Tas	1943–1949
Jo Gullett	Liberal	Henty	Vic	1946–1955
Jim Hadley	Labor	Lilley	Qld	1943–1949
Len Hamilton	Country	Swan	WA	1946–1961
Eric Harrison	Liberal	Wentworth	NSW	1931–1956
Les Haylen	Labor	Parkes	NSW	1943–1963
Jack Holloway	Labor	Melbourne Ports	Vic	1929–1951
Harold Holt	Liberal	Fawkner	Vic	1935–1967
John Howse	Liberal	Calare	NSW	1946–1960
Billy Hughes	Liberal	North Sydney	NSW	1901–1952
William Hutchinson	Liberal	Deakin	Vic	1931–1949
Rowley James	Labor	Hunter	NSW	1928–1958
Herbert Johnson	Labor	Kalgoorlie	WA	1940–1958
Jack Lang	Lang Labor	Reid	NSW	1946–1949
Joe Langtry	Labor	Riverina	NSW	1940–1949
George Lawson	Labor	Brisbane	Qld	1931–1961
Bert Lazzarini	Labor	Werriwa	NSW	1919–1931, 1934–1952
Nelson Lemmon	Labor	Forrest	WA	1943–1949, 1954–1955
Enid Lyons	Liberal	Darwin	Tas	1943–1951
Philip McBride	Liberal	Wakefield	SA	1931–1937, 1937–1943 (S), 1946–1958
Allan McDonald	Liberal	Corangamite	Vic	1940–1953
John McEwen	Country	Indi	Vic	1934–1971
Don McLeod	Labor	Wannon	Vic	1940–1949, 1951–1955
Robert Menzies	Liberal	Kooyong	Vic	1934–1966
Dan Mulcahy	Labor	Lang	NSW	1934–1953
William O'Connor	Labor	West Sydney	NSW	1946–1969
Sir Earle Page	Country	Cowper	NSW	1919–1961
Reg Pollard	Labor	Ballaarat	Vic	1937–1966
George Rankin	Country	Bendigo	Vic	1937–1949, 1950–1956 (S)
Bill Riordan	Labor	Kennedy	Qld	1936–1966
Sol Rosevear	Labor	Dalley	NSW	1931–1953
Edgar Russell	Labor	Grey	SA	1943–1963
Rupert Ryan	Liberal	Flinders	Vic	1940–1952
James Scullin	Labor	Yarra	Vic	1910–1913, 1922–1949
William Scully	Labor	Gwydir	NSW	1937–1949
Tom Sheehan	Labor	Cook	NSW	1937–1955
Thomas Sheehy	Labor	Boothby	SA	1943–1949
Percy Spender	Liberal	Warringah	NSW	1937–1951
Albert Thompson	Labor	Hindmarsh	SA	1946–1963
Winton Turnbull	Country	Wimmera	Vic	1946–1972
Eddie Ward	Labor	East Sydney	NSW	1931, 1932–1963
David Oliver Watkins	Labor	Newcastle	NSW	1935–1958
Thomas White	Liberal	Balaclava	Vic	1929–1951
Thomas Williams	Labor	Robertson	NSW	1943–1949
