= Protestant People's Party =

- Abbreviation: PPP
- Secretary: Ronald Sarina
- Deputy Secretary: Jonno Hodgson
- Founded: 1946
- Dissolved: 1951
- Headquarters: Glebe, New South Wales, Australia
- Ideology: Protestant advocacy; Monarchism; Anti-Catholicism; Australian nationalism
- Political position: Right-wing
- Religion: Christianity (Protestantism)
- Colors: Apricot
- Slogan: “Protestantism Is Patriotism”

The Protestant People's Party (PPP) was a minor Australian political party which operated in the state of New South Wales (NSW) in the 1940s.

The party contested the 1946 Australian federal election for election to the Senate, in which it gained 7.7% of the vote in NSW (which translated to 3% nationally). This was a particularly impressive result for a minor party at the time, given the strength of the two-party system in Australia during the 1940s. Nevertheless, the result was insufficient to gain the PPP a parliamentary seat. Three years later, the PPP contested the 1949 Australian federal election, but saw its vote collapse to just 1% of the total NSW Senate vote. The PPP was never successful in winning representation to either the NSW or Australian parliaments.

== See also ==
- List of political parties in Australia
