= Isabel Longworth =

Australian dentist and peace activist

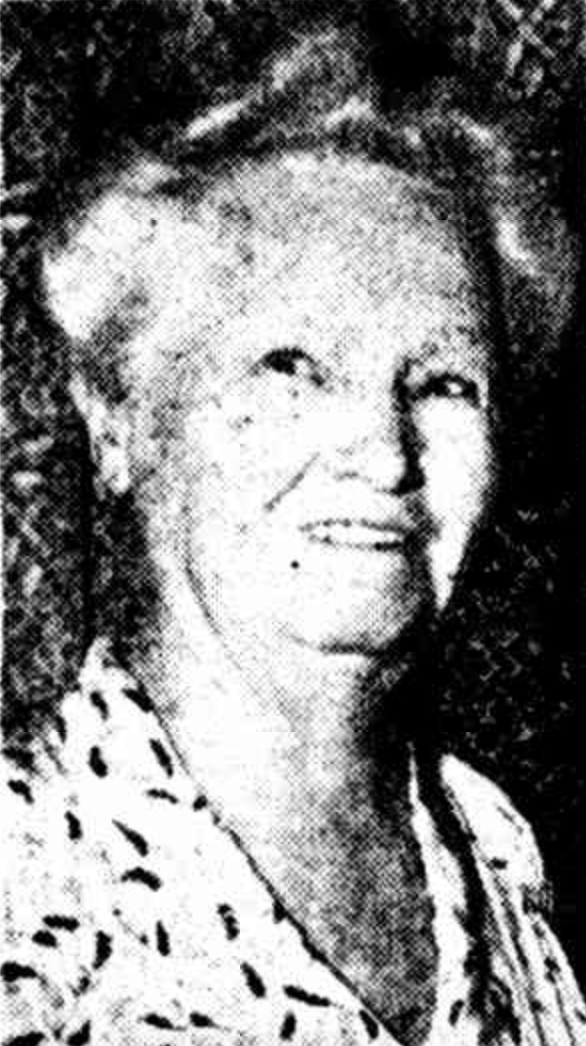
- Isabel Longworth in 1954
- Born: Isabel Frances Swann; 1 June 1881; Temora, New South Wales
- Died: 13 January 1961 (aged 79); Newcastle, New South Wales, Australia
- Occupation: Dentist
- Known for: Peace activism
- Spouse: William Longworth (m. 1924)

Isabel Frances Longworth (1 June 1881 – 13 January 1961) was an Australian dentist and peace activist.

== Early life ==
Born Isabel Frances Swann on 1 June 1881 in Temora, she was the daughter of English-born schoolteacher William Swann and Elizabeth, née Devlin.

== Career ==
Swann was registered as a dentist on 20 June 1902 and began practising at Parramatta; by 1912 she had an address on Liverpool Street. Brought up in a pacifist family, her patients included Miles Franklin, Jennie Scott Griffiths, and others, and she joined the Australian Freedom League in 1912. She was a militant anti-conscriptionist who was disappointed with the attitude taken by Rose Scott and her supporters, who Swann saw as advocating war in the name of defence.

In the late 1910s, Swann was a speaker at Socialist Sunday Schools and became involved in a number of controversial causes, including opposition to saluting the flag in schools and the Howard Prison Reform League. A correspondent of Henry Holland, she claimed partial responsibility for ending indentured labour in Fiji as part of the Anglo-Indian committee. She hid New Guinean natives in Sydney until their shipboard conditions improved and represented the Women's International League for Peace and Freedom at the Australian Peace Alliance conference in 1921.

On 23 August 1924, she married William Longworth, a grinder, at Randwick; they had one daughter, Isabel Jean. The family moved to Wyong in 1932 where they attempted to grow passionfruit commercially, and then to Newcastle in 1936. She helped organise a peace conference with the Christian Socialist Movement, where she argued against fascism. A supporter of the Soviet Union, Longworth unsuccessfully contested the House of Representatives seats of Newcastle (1946) and Shortland (1949) as an Independent Scientific Socialist. At the age of 78, she was recognised as the longest-practising dentist in Australia.

Longworth died on 13 January 1961 at Newcastle and was cremated with Congregational forms.

== See also ==
- List of peace activists
