= George Godfrey (journalist) =

George Fuller Godfrey
- Born: 5 November 1904
- Died: 16 September 1989 (aged 84)
- Occupation: Trade Unionist

George Fuller Godfrey CBE (5 November 1904 – 16 September 1989) was an English-born Australian journalist and trade unionist.

Godfrey was born in Battersea in London to schoolteacher Francis George Godfrey and Millie, née Fuller. He was educated at Strand School and won a mathematics scholarship to Queens' College, Cambridge, from which he received a Bachelor of Arts in 1926 (and later a Master of Arts in 1972). During the general strike in 1926, he enlisted as a special constable. In 1927, he emigrated to Australia, arriving in 1927 in Melbourne. He taught mathematics for a term at Essendon High School before being employed by The Argus in May. In 1930, he moved to Sydney to work for the afternoon broadsheet the Sun, of which he became a sub-editor (1943) and relieving editor. He married a clerk, Phyllis Berenice Alethia Carling, at St Augustine's Church of England in Neutral Bay on 21 June 1932.

In 1927, Godfrey joined the Australian Journalists' Association (AJA); he was elected to the state committee in 1934 and 1940, and was state president from 1941 to 1953 during which time he federally implemented a code of ethics. He was awarded the gold honour badge in 1944. Godfrey was elected federal president of the AJA in 1963, serving until 1974. He was a long-term campaigner for the Australian Press Council, which was finally established in 1976.

Godfrey was also a prominent figure in the Australian Labor Party; he became president in 1944 of the Mosman branch in one of Sydney's least Labor-friendly areas. He edited the Labor Digest from 1945 to 1946, was elected a party conference delegate in 1946 and was on the state executive from 1959 to 1971. Godfrey was also a member of the Fabian Society. In 1955, he came to the rescue of federal leader Bert Evatt by providing him with membership of the Mosman branch after Evatt's leadership was not renewed.

Godfrey wrote a column for the A.L.P. News in the early 1960s. He published a series of articles on democratic socialism for the A.L.P. Journal from 1960 to 1968. An anti-censorship campaigner, Godfrey had rallied against the imprisonment of Robert Close for obscene libel in 1948, opposed Robert Menzies' attempt to dissolve the Communist Party in 1950, and objected to the barring of Russian journalist Vadim Nekrasov in 1963.

In the later years of his federal presidency, Godfrey opposed the more militant unionists who opposed the close relationship between the union and media proprietors. He retired from the Sun in 1971 and worked for the North Shore Times from 1976 to 1986. Appointed Commander of the Order of the British Empire in 1972, Godfrey was also a Freemason. He died at Mosman in 1989 and was cremated.
