= Bill Bryson (politician) =

Australian politician (1898–1973)

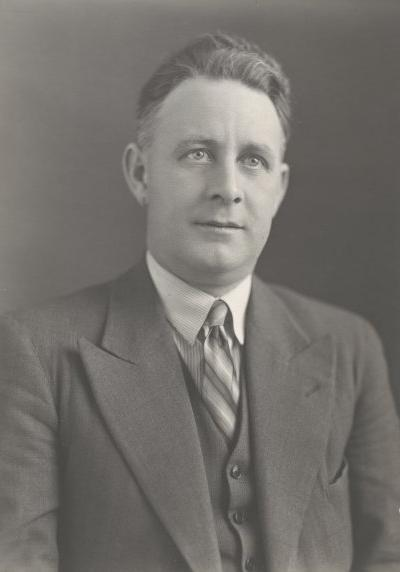

Member of the Australian Parliament for Bourke
- In office 21 August 1943 – 28 September 1946
- Preceded by: Maurice Blackburn
- Succeeded by: Doris Blackburn

Member of the Australian Parliament for Wills
- In office 10 December 1949 – 10 December 1955
- Preceded by: New seat
- Succeeded by: Gordon Bryant

Personal details
- Born: 24 February 1898 Maldon, Victoria, Australia
- Died: 2 March 1973 (aged 75) Coburg, Victoria, Australia
- Party: Labor (1943–55); Labor (A-C) (1955)

William George Bryson (24 February 1898 – 2 March 1973) was an Australian politician for the Australian Labor Party from 1943 to 1946 and 1949 to 1955 and helped establish the Democratic Labor Party.

Bryson won the House of Representatives seat of Bourke at the 1943 election, but was beaten by the independent Doris Blackburn at the 1946 election. Bourke was abolished prior to the 1949 election and partly replaced by Wills and Bryson defeated Blackburn at the election. In 1955, Bryson and six other Victorian federal members were expelled from the Labor Party as members of the Industrial Groups. In April 1955, they established the Australian Labor Party (Anti-Communist), which was renamed the Democratic Labor Party in 1957. Bryson was beaten by the Labor candidate, Gordon Bryant at the 1955 election.

Bryson was the treasurer of the Carlton Football Club from 1927 to 1943.

He died on 2 March 1973, in Coburg, aged 75.

== Notes ==
Parliament of Australia
Preceded by Maurice Blackburn	Member for Bourke; 1943–1946	Succeeded by Doris Blackburn
New division	Member for Wills; 1949–1955	Succeeded by Gordon Bryant
