= Division of Bourke =

Former Australian federal electoral division

Bourke Australian House of Representatives Division
- Created: 1901
- Abolished: 1949
- Namesake: Sir Richard Bourke

The Division of Bourke was an Australian electoral division in Victoria. The division was proclaimed in 1900, and was one of the original 65 divisions to be contested at the first federal election. The division was named for Sir Richard Bourke, Governor of New South Wales at the time of the founding of Melbourne. After 1910, it was a safe seat for the Australian Labor Party, but was lost to an independent Labor member in 1946.

When the division was first proclaimed, it covered a large area of the northern suburbs of Melbourne, spanning from Essendon in the west, to what was later Watsonia North in the north-east, and to Ivanhoe East in the south-east. The division underwent boundary changes throughout its existence and at one point, also covered Thomastown and Eltham. It underwent its largest boundary change in 1922, when it was significantly shrunk to cover mainly the suburbs of Brunswick and Coburg only, as well as parts of Pascoe Vale. The lost areas were replaced by the expanded Division of Batman and Division of Flinders.

The division was abolished in 1949. It was replaced by the similarly named Division of Burke (named after a different person Robert O'Hara Burke), which also covered the Brunswick area, and the newly created Division of Wills which covered the Coburg area.

== Members ==
Image	Member	Party	Term	Notes
	James Hume Cook (1866–1942)	Protectionist	29 March 1901 – 26 May 1909	Previously held the Victorian Legislative Assembly seat of East Bourke Boroughs. Served as Chief Government Whip in the House under Deakin. Served as minister under Deakin. Lost seat
	James Hume Cook (1866–1942)	Liberal	26 May 1909 – 13 April 1910	Previously held the Victorian Legislative Assembly seat of East Bourke Boroughs. Served as Chief Government Whip in the House under Deakin. Served as minister under Deakin. Lost seat
	Frank Anstey (1865–1940)	Labor	13 April 1910 – 7 August 1934	Previously held the Victorian Legislative Assembly seat of Brunswick. Served as minister under Scullin. Retired
	Maurice Blackburn (1880–1944)	Labor	15 September 1934 – 15 November 1935	Previously held the Victorian Legislative Assembly seat of Clifton Hill. Lost seat. Wife was Doris Blackburn
	Maurice Blackburn (1880–1944)	Independent Labor	15 November 1935 – 27 March 1937	Previously held the Victorian Legislative Assembly seat of Clifton Hill. Lost seat. Wife was Doris Blackburn
	Maurice Blackburn (1880–1944)	Labor	27 March 1937 – 3 October 1941	Previously held the Victorian Legislative Assembly seat of Clifton Hill. Lost seat. Wife was Doris Blackburn
	Maurice Blackburn (1880–1944)	Independent Labor	3 October 1941 – 21 August 1943	Previously held the Victorian Legislative Assembly seat of Clifton Hill. Lost seat. Wife was Doris Blackburn
	Bill Bryson (1898–1973)	Labor	21 August 1943 – 28 September 1946	Lost seat. Later elected to the Division of Wills in 1949
	Doris Blackburn (1889–1970)	Independent Labor	28 September 1946 – 26 June 1947	Failed to win the Division of Wills after Bourke was abolished in 1949. Husband was Maurice Blackburn
	Doris Blackburn (1889–1970)	Blackburn-Mutton Labor	26 June 1947 – 10 December 1949	Failed to win the Division of Wills after Bourke was abolished in 1949. Husband was Maurice Blackburn
