= 1946 Australian federal election =

- 28 September 1946

All 75 (Note: The Northern Territory had one seat, but members for the territories did not have full voting rights until 1966 and did not count toward government formation.) seats of the House of Representatives 38 seats were needed for a majority in the House 19 (of the 36) seats of the Senate
- Registered: 4,739,853 (▲6.12%)
- Turnout: 4,453,941 (93.97%) (▼2.35 pp)
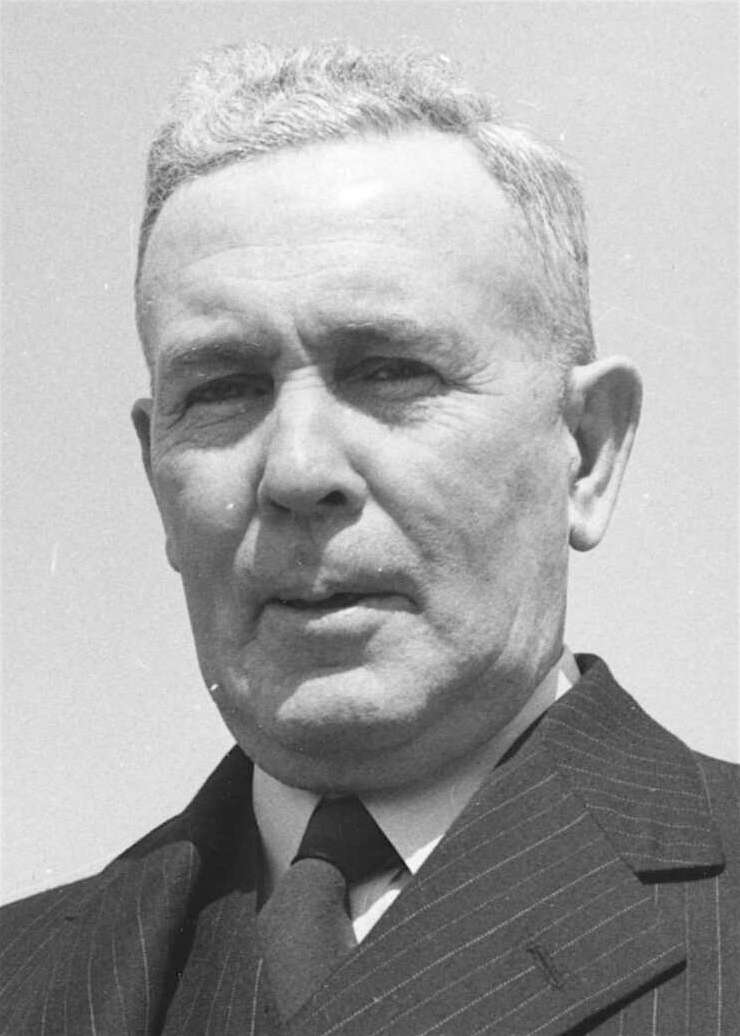

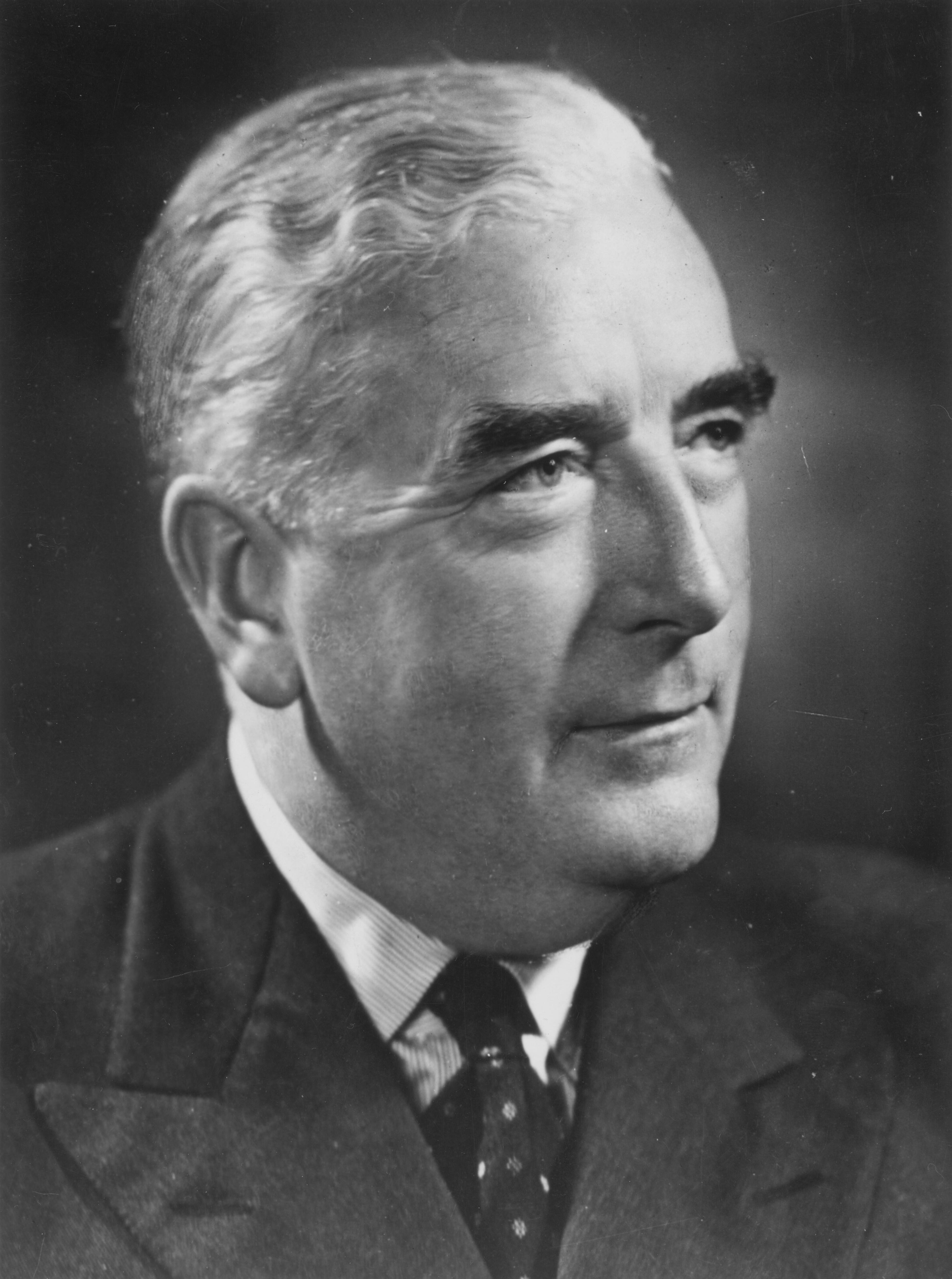

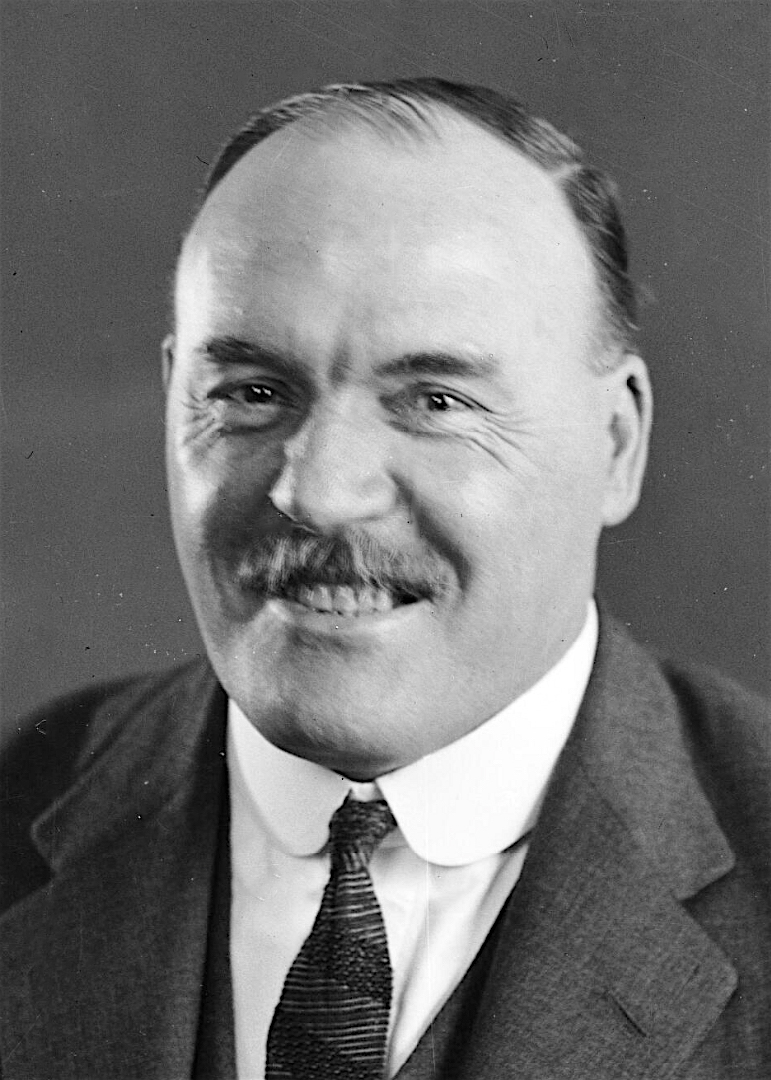
	First party	Second party
Leader	Ben Chifley	Robert Menzies
Party	Labor	Liberal–Country; Coalition
Leader since	13 July 1945	23 September 1943
Leader's seat	Macquarie (NSW)	Kooyong (Vic.)
Last election	49 seats	19 seats
Seats won	43	29
Seat change	▼6	▲10
Primary vote	2,159,953	1,896,349
Percentage	49.71%	43.65%
Swing	▼0.22	▲13.20
TPP	54.10%	45.90%
TPP swing	▼4.10	▲4.10
	Third party	Fourth party
		IND
Leader	Jack Lang	N/A
Party	Labor (Non-Communist)	Independents
Leader since		N/A
Leader's seat	Reid (NSW) (won seat)	N/A
Last election	0 seats	3 seats
Seats won	1	2
Seat change	▲1	▼1
Primary vote	69,138	79,040
Percentage	1.59%	1.82%
Swing	▲0.87	▼10.34
- Results by division for the House of Representatives, shaded by winning party's margin of victory.
Prime Minister before election
Ben Chifley
Labor
Subsequent Prime Minister
Ben Chifley
Labor

A federal election was held in Australia on 28 September 1946. All 74 seats in the House of Representatives and 19 of the 36 seats in the Senate were up for election. The incumbent Labor Party led by Prime Minister Ben Chifley defeated the opposition Liberal–Country coalition, led by Robert Menzies. It was the Liberal Party's first federal election since its creation. This was the first time the Labor party had won a second consecutive election. This was also the last time the Labor party would win a federal election until the 1972 election.

The election was held in conjunction with three referendum questions, one of which was carried.

== Results ==
=== House of Representatives ===
Labor: 43 seats Liberal: 18 seats Country: 11 seats Lang Labor: 1 seat Independent: 1 seat

House of Reps (IRV) — 1946–49—Turnout 93.97% (CV) — Informal 2.45%
Party	First preference votes	%	Swing	Seats	Change
Labor	2,159,953	49.71	−0.22	43	−6
Liberal–Country coalition	1,896,349	43.65	+13.20	29	+6
Liberal	1,431,682	32.95	+11.05	18	+4
Country	464,667	10.70	+2.16	11	+2
Labor (Non-Communist)	69,138	1.59	+0.87	1	+1
Communist	64,811	1.49	+1.49	0	0
Services	55,140	1.27	+1.27	0	0
Protestant People's	20,111	0.46	+0.46	0	0
Independents	79,040	1.82	−10.34	2 (Note: Including Northern Territory)	-1
Total	4,344,542			75	
Two-party-preferred (estimated)
Labor	Win	54.10	−4.10	43	−6
Liberal–Country coalition		45.90	+4.10	29	+6

Notes

- Independent: Doris Blackburn (Bourke, Vic.)
- In South Australia, the Liberal Party was known as the Liberal and Country League.

First preference vote
Labor	49.71%
Liberal	32.95%
Country	10.70%
Lang Labor	1.59%
Independent/Other	1.83%

Two-party-preferred vote
Labor	54.10%
Coalition	45.90%

Parliament seats
Labor	58.11%
Coalition	35.14%

=== Senate ===
Senate (P BV) — 1946–49—Turnout 93.97% (CV) — Informal 8.01%
Party	First preference votes	%	Swing	Seats won	Seats held	Change
Labor	2,133,272	52.06	−3.02	16	33	+11
Liberal–Country coalition	1,775,022	43.33	+5.18	3	3	–11
Liberal–Country joint ticket	1,561,718	38.12	N/A	3	N/A	N/A
Liberal	213,304	5.21	N/A	0	2	–10
Country	N/A	N/A	N/A	0	1	–1
Protestant People's	123,541	3.02	+3.02	0	0	0
Services	37,724	0.92	+0.92	0	0	0
Independents	27,767	0.68	–3.83	0	0	0
Total	4,097,326			19	36	

Notes

- Of the three senators elected on Liberal–Country joint tickets, two were Liberal Party members and one was a Country Party member.

== Seats changing hands ==
Seat	Pre-1946			Swing	Post-1946		
Seat	Party	Member	Margin	Swing	Margin	Member	Party
Bourke, Vic	Labor	Bill Bryson	3.6	4.7	1.1	Doris Blackburn	Independent
Calare, NSW	Labor	John Breen	9.9	11.7	1.8	John Howse	Liberal
Capricornia, Qld	Labor	Frank Forde	5.9	8.8	2.9	Charles Davidson	Country
Franklin, Tas	Labor	Charles Frost	9.9	10.0	0.1	Bill Falkinder	Liberal
Henty, Vic	Independent	Arthur Coles	5.5	9.8	4.3	Jo Gullett	Liberal
Reid, NSW	Labor	Charles Morgan	N/A	7.4	4.2	Jack Lang	Lang Labor
Swan, WA	Labor	Don Mountjoy	3.0	3.2	0.2	Len Hamilton	Country
Wakefield, SA	Labor	Albert Smith	1.2	3.9	2.7	Philip McBride	Liberal
Wilmot, Tas	Liberal	Allan Guy	1.7	3.4	1.7	Gil Duthie	Labor

- Members listed in italics did not contest their seat at this election.

== See also ==
- Candidates of the 1946 Australian federal election
- Members of the Australian House of Representatives, 1946–1949
- Members of the Australian Senate, 1947–1950
