= Services Party of Australia =

Political Party of Australia active in mid-1940's

The Services Party of Australia was a minor Australian political party that was active in the mid-1940s. It received over 7% of the vote in Queensland at the 1946 federal election.

The honorary secretary of the party was Charles Brown, a former independent MP in Queensland. By 31 July 1945 the party was claiming 10,000 members.
