= Electoral results for the Division of Henty =

Australian division election results

This is a list of electoral results for the Division of Henty in Australian federal elections from the division's creation in 1913 until its abolition in 1990.

== Members ==
Member	Party	Term
James Boyd	Liberal	1913–1917
James Boyd	Nationalist	1917–1919
Frederick Francis	Independent	1919–1922
Frederick Francis	Nationalist	1922–1925
(Sir) Henry Gullett	Nationalist	1925–1931
(Sir) Henry Gullett	United Australia	1931–1940
Arthur Coles	Independent	1940–1946
Jo Gullett	Liberal	1946–1955
Max Fox	Liberal	1955–1974
Joan Child	Labor	1974–1975
Ken Aldred	Liberal	1975–1980
Joan Child	Labor	1980–1990

== Election results ==
=== Elections in the 1980s ===
==== 1987 ====
1987 Australian federal election: Henty
Party	Candidate	Votes	%	±%
Labor	Joan Child	30,695	50.5	−2.4
Liberal	Rudi Michelson	25,138	41.3	+2.2
Democrats	Paul Hegarty	4,992	8.2	+2.9
Total formal votes		60,825	94.5	
Informal votes		3,526	5.5	
Turnout		64,351	94.3	
Two-party-preferred result
Labor	Joan Child	33,301	54.8	−1.9
Liberal	Rudi Michelson	27,496	45.2	+1.9
Labor hold		Swing	−1.9	

==== 1984 ====
1984 Australian federal election: Henty
Party	Candidate	Votes	%	±%
Labor	Joan Child	32,297	52.9	−1.2
Liberal	Rudi Michelson	23,885	39.1	−0.3
Democrats	Margaret Moore	3,216	5.3	+1.0
Democratic Labor	Martin Callanan	988	1.6	−0.6
National	Peter Ryan	690	1.1	+1.1
Total formal votes		61,076	93.1	
Informal votes		4,492	6.9	
Turnout		65,568	94.4	
Two-party-preferred result
Labor	Joan Child	34,627	56.7	−0.2
Liberal	Rudi Michelson	26,441	43.3	+0.2
Labor hold		Swing	−0.2	

==== 1983 ====
1983 Australian federal election: Henty
Party	Candidate	Votes	%	±%
Labor	Joan Child	36,259	54.7	+5.6
Liberal	Craig Baxter	25,709	38.8	−3.5
Democrats	Harry Eichler	2,845	4.3	−1.7
Democratic Labor	Paul Carroll	1,442	2.2	−0.4
Total formal votes		66,255	98.3	
Informal votes		1,169	1.7	
Turnout		67,424	95.5	
Two-party-preferred result
Labor	Joan Child		57.5	+4.7
Liberal	Craig Baxter		42.5	−4.7
Labor hold		Swing	+4.7	

==== 1980 ====
1980 Australian federal election: Henty
Party	Candidate	Votes	%	±%
Labor	Joan Child	32,102	49.1	+7.6
Liberal	Ken Aldred	27,702	42.3	−2.7
Democrats	Jonathan Melland	3,926	6.0	−3.9
Democratic Labor	John Mulholland	1,698	2.6	−0.5
Total formal votes		65,428	97.8	
Informal votes		1,441	2.2	
Turnout		66,869	95.2	
Two-party-preferred result
Labor	Joan Child	34,541	52.8	+5.5
Liberal	Ken Aldred	30,887	47.2	−5.5
Labor gain from Liberal		Swing	+5.5	

=== Elections in the 1970s ===
==== 1977 ====
1977 Australian federal election: Henty
Party	Candidate	Votes	%	±%
Liberal	Ken Aldred	29,660	45.0	−6.5
Labor	Joan Child	27,325	41.5	−2.3
Democrats	Fred Ingamells	6,509	9.9	+9.9
Democratic Labor	Terry Farrell	2,061	3.1	−0.4
Independent	Tony Dear	359	0.5	+0.5
Total formal votes		65,914	97.1	
Informal votes		1,946	2.9	
Turnout		67,860	95.8	
Two-party-preferred result
Liberal	Ken Aldred	34,736	52.7	−2.5
Labor	Joan Child	31,178	47.3	+2.5
Liberal hold		Swing	−2.5	

==== 1975 ====
1975 Australian federal election: Henty
Party	Candidate	Votes	%	±%
Liberal	Ken Aldred	29,621	51.5	+7.5
Labor	Joan Child	25,158	43.8	−5.8
Democratic Labor	Terry Farrell	1,989	3.5	−0.7
Australia	Michael Hughes	536	0.9	+0.9
Independent	Marc Aussie-Stone	190	0.3	+0.3
Total formal votes		57,494	98.2	
Informal votes		1,064	1.8	
Turnout		58,558	95.9	
Two-party-preferred result
Liberal	Ken Aldred		55.2	+6.7
Labor	Joan Child		44.8	−6.7
Liberal gain from Labor		Swing	+6.7	

==== 1974 ====
1974 Australian federal election: Henty
Party	Candidate	Votes	%	±%
Labor	Joan Child	28,111	49.6	+3.2
Liberal	Max Fox	24,953	44.0	+1.6
Democratic Labor	Terry Farrell	2,408	4.2	−3.2
Australia	Michael Hughes	1,191	2.1	−1.8
Total formal votes		56,663	98.1	
Informal votes		1,093	1.9	
Turnout		57,756	95.3	
Two-party-preferred result
Labor	Joan Child		51.5	+1.8
Liberal	Max Fox		48.5	−1.8
Labor gain from Liberal		Swing	+1.8	

==== 1972 ====
1972 Australian federal election: Henty
Party	Candidate	Votes	%	±%
Labor	Joan Child	24,701	46.4	+10.7
Liberal	Max Fox	22,577	42.4	−4.2
Democratic Labor	Terry Farrell	3,926	7.4	−2.3
Australia	Michael Hughes	2,080	3.9	+3.9
Total formal votes		53,284	97.9	
Informal votes		1,128	2.1	
Turnout		54,412	95.4	
Two-party-preferred result
Liberal	Max Fox	26,796	50.3	−9.1
Labor	Joan Child	26,488	49.7	+9.1
Liberal hold		Swing	−9.1	

=== Elections in the 1960s ===
==== 1969 ====
1969 Australian federal election: Henty
Party	Candidate	Votes	%	±%
Liberal	Max Fox	24,353	46.6	−4.9
Labor	Robert Ray	18,670	35.7	−1.7
Democratic Labor	John Launder	5,050	9.7	−1.4
Independent	Herman Crowther	4,172	8.0	+8.0
Total formal votes		52,245	97.3	
Informal votes		1,440	2.7	
Turnout		53,685	95.0	
Two-party-preferred result
Liberal	Max Fox		59.4	−2.3
Labor	Robert Ray		40.6	+2.3
Liberal hold		Swing	−2.3	

==== 1966 ====
1966 Australian federal election: Henty
Party	Candidate	Votes	%	±%
Liberal	Max Fox	23,072	49.9	−1.7
Labor	Maureen Campbell-Teich	18,053	39.0	+6.0
Democratic Labor	Henry Moore	5,114	11.1	+1.1
Total formal votes		46,239	97.2	
Informal votes		1,354	2.8	
Turnout		47,593	95.7	
Two-party-preferred result
Liberal	Max Fox	27,783	60.1	+0.8
Labor	Maureen Campbell-Teich	18,456	39.9	−0.8
Liberal hold		Swing	+0.8	

==== 1963 ====
1963 Australian federal election: Henty
Party	Candidate	Votes	%	±%
Liberal	Max Fox	24,110	51.6	+5.7
Labor	George Taylor	15,425	33.0	−7.3
Democratic Labor	Joseph McHugh	4,694	10.0	−3.8
Independent Labor	Herbert Viney	2,500	5.3	+5.3
Total formal votes		46,729	98.8	
Informal votes		564	1.2	
Turnout		47,293	96.7	
Two-party-preferred result
Liberal	Max Fox		59.3	+1.6
Labor	George Taylor		40.7	−1.6
Liberal hold		Swing	+1.6	

==== 1961 ====
1961 Australian federal election: Henty
Party	Candidate	Votes	%	±%
Liberal	Max Fox	21,011	45.9	−4.6
Labor	Sir George Jones	18,416	40.3	+3.7
Democratic Labor	Henry Moore	6,302	13.8	+0.9
Total formal votes		45,729	98.2	
Informal votes		856	1.8	
Turnout		46,585	96.0	
Two-party-preferred result
Liberal	Max Fox	26,377	57.7	−4.4
Labor	Sir George Jones	19,352	42.3	+4.4
Liberal hold		Swing	−4.4	

=== Elections in the 1950s ===
==== 1958 ====
1958 Australian federal election: Henty
Party	Candidate	Votes	%	±%
Liberal	Max Fox	22,506	50.5	−3.7
Labor	Tom Gilhooley	16,276	36.6	+2.8
Democratic Labor	Henry Moore	5,742	12.9	+0.9
Total formal votes		44,524	97.8	
Informal votes		987	2.2	
Turnout		45,511	96.2	
Two-party-preferred result
Liberal	Max Fox		62.1	−1.7
Labor	Tom Gilhooley		37.9	+1.7
Liberal hold		Swing	−1.7	

==== 1955 ====
1955 Australian federal election: Henty
Party	Candidate	Votes	%	±%
Liberal	Max Fox	22,377	54.2	+0.6
Labor	Percy Treyvaud	13,953	33.8	−11.9
Labor (A-C)	Henry Moore	4,966	12.0	+12.0
Total formal votes		41,296	97.3	
Informal votes		1,146	2.7	
Turnout		42,442	94.8	
Two-party-preferred result
Liberal	Max Fox		63.8	+9.5
Labor	Percy Treyvaud		36.2	−9.5
Liberal hold		Swing	+9.5	

==== 1954 ====
1954 Australian federal election: Henty
Party	Candidate	Votes	%	±%
Liberal	Jo Gullett	22,858	56.6	−0.7
Labor	Alexander Miller	16,400	40.6	−0.2
Independent Liberal	Noel Schafer	1,124	2.8	+2.8
Total formal votes		40,382	99.0	
Informal votes		392	1.0	
Turnout		40,774	96.2	
Two-party-preferred result
Liberal	Jo Gullett		58.0	+0.5
Labor	Alexander Miller		42.0	−0.5
Liberal hold		Swing	+0.5	

==== 1951 ====
1951 Australian federal election: Henty
Party	Candidate	Votes	%	±%
Liberal	Jo Gullett	23,642	57.3	+2.1
Labor	Percy Treyvaud	16,814	40.8	−1.9
Communist	Doris McRae	781	1.9	+1.9
Total formal votes		41,237	98.6	
Informal votes		584	1.4	
Turnout		41,821	96.4	
Two-party-preferred result
Liberal	Jo Gullett		57.5	+2.1
Labor	Percy Treyvaud		42.5	−2.1
Liberal hold		Swing	+2.1	

=== Elections in the 1940s ===
==== 1949 ====
1949 Australian federal election: Henty
Party	Candidate	Votes	%	±%
Liberal	Jo Gullett	22,650	55.2	+4.1
Labor	Val Doube	17,548	42.7	−6.2
Lang Labor	Charles Dicker	858	2.1	+2.1
Total formal votes		41,056	98.8	
Informal votes		510	1.2	
Turnout		41,566	96.7	
Two-party-preferred result
Liberal	Jo Gullett		55.4	+4.3
Labor	Val Doube		44.6	−4.3
Liberal hold		Swing	+4.3	

==== 1946 ====
1946 Australian federal election: Henty
Party	Candidate	Votes	%	±%
Liberal	Jo Gullett	41,069	52.1	+14.0
Labor	Val Doube	37,785	47.9	+47.9
Total formal votes		78,854	98.5	
Informal votes		1,196	1.5	
Turnout		80,050	95.0	
Liberal hold		Swing	+14.0	

1946 Henty by-election
Party	Candidate	Votes	%	±%
Liberal	Jo Gullett	38,718	54.3	+16.2
Labor	Val Doube	32,556	45.7	+45.7
Total formal votes		71,274	98.5	
Informal votes		1,086	1.5	
Turnout		72,360	89.5	
Liberal gain from Independent		Swing	+9.8	

==== 1943 ====
1943 Australian federal election: Henty
Party	Candidate	Votes	%	±%
Independent	Arthur Coles	32,885	44.5	−10.1
United Australia	Jo Gullett	28,123	38.1	+38.1
Independent Labor	Bernard Rees	4,598	6.2	+6.2
Services and Citizens	Edmund Lind	4,437	6.0	+6.0
Women for Canberra	Ivy Weber	2,885	3.9	+3.9
Independent Liberal	Carlyle Ferguson	928	1.3	+1.3
Total formal votes		73,856	96.6	
Informal votes		2,596	3.4	
Turnout		76,452	97.5	
Two-party-preferred result
Independent	Arthur Coles		55.5	−8.0
United Australia	Jo Gullett		44.5	+44.5
Independent hold		Swing	−8.0	

==== 1940 ====
1940 Australian federal election: Henty
Party	Candidate	Votes	%	±%
Independent	Arthur Coles	35,542	54.6	+54.6
Labor	Arthur Haywood	23,319	35.8	+3.3
Independent	Eric Young	4,927	7.6	+7.6
Independent	Samuel Thomas	704	1.1	+1.1
Independent	Edward Riley	567	0.9	+0.9
Total formal votes		65,059	97.9	
Informal votes		1,368	2.1	
Turnout		66,427	96.7	
Two-party-preferred result
Independent	Arthur Coles		63.5	+63.5
Labor	Arthur Haywood		36.5	−3.2
Independent gain from United Australia		Swing	+3.2	

=== Elections in the 1930s ===
==== 1937 ====
1937 Australian federal election: Henty
Party	Candidate	Votes	%	±%
United Australia	Sir Henry Gullett	31,574	53.0	−3.5
Labor	Sydney Walker	19,324	32.5	+8.3
Independent	Rupert Hornabrook	8,647	14.5	+14.5
Total formal votes		59,545	97.6	
Informal votes		1,450	2.4	
Turnout		60,995	96.2	
Two-party-preferred result
United Australia	Sir Henry Gullett		60.3	−5.9
Labor	Sydney Walker		39.7	+5.9
United Australia hold		Swing	−5.9	

==== 1934 ====
1934 Australian federal election: Henty
Party	Candidate	Votes	%	±%
United Australia	Sir Henry Gullett	47,010	60.1	−14.9
Labor	William Turner	16,878	21.6	−3.4
Ind. Nationalist	Alexander Steele	8,315	10.6	+10.6
Social Credit	Lockhart Stewart	6,030	7.7	+7.7
Total formal votes		78,233	96.9	
Informal votes		2,544	3.1	
Turnout		80,777	94.6	
Two-party-preferred result
United Australia	Sir Henry Gullett		69.3	−5.7
Labor	William Turner		30.7	+5.7
United Australia hold		Swing	−5.7	

==== 1931 ====
1931 Australian federal election: Henty
Party	Candidate	Votes	%	±%
United Australia	Henry Gullett	56,404	75.0	+26.4
Labor	Fred Katz	18,835	25.0	−20.4
Total formal votes		75,239	97.4	
Informal votes		1,985	2.6	
Turnout		77,224	94.2	
United Australia hold		Swing	+23.8	

=== Elections in the 1920s ===
==== 1929 ====
1929 Australian federal election: Henty
Party	Candidate	Votes	%	±%
Nationalist	Henry Gullett	35,557	48.6	−18.0
Labor	Billy Duggan	33,195	45.4	+12.0
Ind. Nationalist	William Bolton	4,355	6.0	+6.0
Total formal votes		73,107	98.8	
Informal votes		870	1.2	
Turnout		73,977	95.2	
Two-party-preferred result
Nationalist	Henry Gullett	37,433	51.2	−15.4
Labor	Billy Duggan	35,674	48.8	+15.4
Nationalist hold		Swing	−15.4	

==== 1928 ====
1928 Australian federal election: Henty
Party	Candidate	Votes	%	±%
Nationalist	Henry Gullett	45,489	66.6	+15.1
Labor	Edward Stewart	22,839	33.4	+3.7
Total formal votes		68,328	96.8	
Informal votes		2,249	3.2	
Turnout		70,577	94.4	
Nationalist hold		Swing	+5.7	

==== 1925 ====
1925 Australian federal election: Henty
Party	Candidate	Votes	%	±%
Nationalist	Henry Gullett	31,077	51.5	−28.7
Labor	Edward Stewart	17,930	29.7	+9.9
Ind. Nationalist	Donald Mackinnon	11,318	18.8	+18.8
Total formal votes		60,325	98.5	
Informal votes		909	1.5	
Turnout		61,234	94.6	
Two-party-preferred result
Nationalist	Henry Gullett		60.9	−39.1
Labor	Edward Stewart		39.1	+39.1
Nationalist hold		Swing	−39.1	

==== 1922 ====
1922 Australian federal election: Henty
Party	Candidate	Votes	%	±%
Nationalist	Frederick Francis	10,794	38.1	+39.4
Labor	Roy Beardsworth	5,615	19.8	−3.0
Liberal	Henry Gullett	5,082	18.0	+18.0
Liberal	Eleanor Glencross	3,551	12.5	+12.5
Nationalist	James Boyd	3,269	11.5	+11.5
Total formal votes		28,311	94.8	
Informal votes		1,545	5.2	
Turnout		29,856	63.0	
Two-party-preferred result
Nationalist	Frederick Francis	15,811	55.8	+8.7
Liberal	Henry Gullett	12,500	44.2	+44.2
Nationalist gain from Independent		Swing	+8.7	

=== Elections in the 1910s ===
==== 1919 ====
1919 Australian federal election: Henty
Party	Candidate	Votes	%	±%
Nationalist	James Boyd	17,293	40.8	−29.8
Ind. Nationalist	Frederick Francis	12,382	29.2	+29.2
Labor	Norman Grant	9,582	22.6	−6.8
Ind. Nationalist	Edwin Purbrick	3,097	7.3	+7.3
Total formal votes		42,354	95.8	
Informal votes		1,864	4.2	
Turnout		44,218	74.7	
Two-party-preferred result
Independent	Frederick Francis	22,396	52.9	+52.9
Nationalist	James Boyd	19,958	47.1	−23.2
Independent gain from Nationalist		Swing	+23.2	

==== 1917 ====
1917 Australian federal election: Henty
Party	Candidate	Votes	%	±%
Nationalist	James Boyd	30,119	70.6	+17.8
Labor	William Smith	12,526	29.4	−8.1
Total formal votes		42,645	97.9	
Informal votes		908	2.1	
Turnout		43,553	81.6	
Nationalist hold		Swing	+12.9	

==== 1914 ====
1914 Australian federal election: Henty
Party	Candidate	Votes	%	±%
Liberal	James Boyd	17,742	42.8	−13.5
Labor	Albert Andrews	12,607	37.5	+5.3
Independent	Richard Crouch	3,238	9.6	+9.6
Total formal votes		33,587	97.8	
Informal votes		753	2.2	
Turnout		34,340	74.7	
Liberal hold		Swing	−9.4	

==== 1913 ====
1913 Australian federal election: Henty
Party	Candidate	Votes	%	±%
Liberal	James Boyd	19,138	66.3	+4.6
Labor	William Miles	9,284	32.2	+7.9
Independent Liberal	Joseph Hewison	446	1.5	+1.5
Total formal votes		28,868	97.4	
Informal votes		769	2.6	
Turnout		29,637	71.5	
Liberal notional hold		Swing	−1.6	
