= 1946 Henty by-election =

30 March 1946
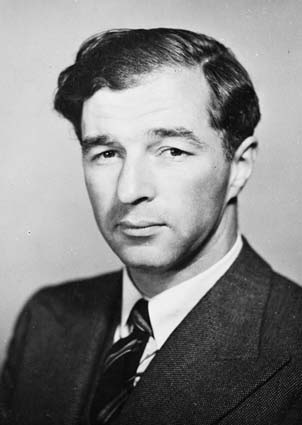
	First party	Second party
		ALP
Candidate	Jo Gullett	Val Doube
Party	Liberal	Labor
Popular vote	38,718	32,556
Percentage	54.32%	45.68%
Swing	▲16.24pp	▲45.68pp
MP before election
Arthur Coles
Independent
Elected MP
Jo Gullett
Liberal

A by-election was held in the Henty electorate in the eastern suburbs of Melbourne on 30 March 1946, following the resignation of independent MP Arthur Coles.

== Background ==
Coles, a prominent businessman and founder of the Coles supermarket chain, had won the seat as an independent United Australia Party candidate at the 1940 federal election. The seat had been left open due to the death of incumbent MP Henry Gullett, a senior minister in the Menzies government, in the Canberra air disaster five weeks before the election.

Coles had duly joined the United Australia Party in early 1941, but resigned in August that year after Menzies was deposed as leader. He subsequently joined with another independent, Alexander Wilson, to vote down the Fadden UAP government in October 1941, installing Labor leader John Curtin as Prime Minister. He had generally been seen as sympathetic to Labor thereafter, and was re-elected in 1943 against Gullett's son, Henry "Jo" Gullett. In February, 1946, he was appointed chairman of the new Australian National Airlines Commission by Curtin's successor Ben Chifley, thus necessitating his resignation from parliament, which occurred on 12 February.

== Results ==
Henty by-election, 1946
Party	Candidate	Votes	%	±%
Liberal	Jo Gullett	38,718	54.32	+16.24
Labor	Val Doube	32,556	45.68	+45.68
Total formal votes		71,274	98.50	+1.89
Informal votes		1,086	1.50	−1.89
Turnout		72,360	89.46	−8.07
Liberal gain from Independent		Swing	+16.24	
