= 1940 Canberra air disaster =

Air crash in Australia

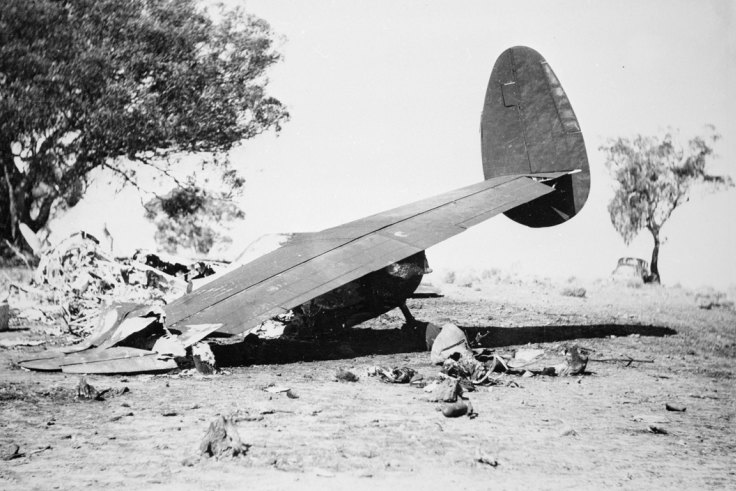
- Wreckage of A16-97

Accident
- Date: 13 August 1940
- Summary: Stall on approach to land
- Site: Canberra, Australian Capital Territory; 35.3184°S 149.2293°E

Aircraft
- Aircraft type: Lockheed Hudson
- Operator: Royal Australian Air Force
- Registration: A16-97
- Flight origin: Essendon Airport
- Destination: Canberra Airport
- Occupants: 10
- Passengers: 6
- Crew: 4
- Fatalities: 10
- Survivors: 0

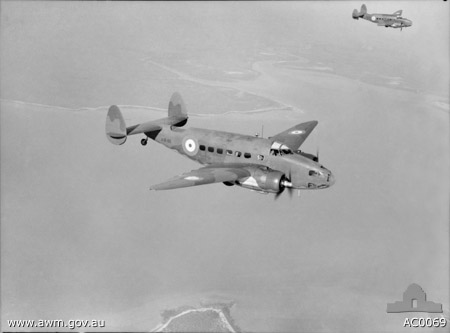
Two Australian Lockheed Hudsons in 1940

The 1940 Canberra air disaster occurred on 13 August 1940 with the crash of a Lockheed Hudson bomber, A16-97, killing all ten people on board. The aircraft was carrying senior members of the cabinet and Australian Defence Force. The crash occurred in the first year of Australia's involvement in World War II and had major political consequences.

The aircraft involved in the crash was operated by the Royal Australian Air Force (RAAF), one of four Hudson bombers that had been converted into passenger aircraft to form the basis of the RAAF's first VIP aircraft fleet. The flight between Essendon Airport and Canberra Airport was organised to carry senior officials from their offices in Melbourne to attend a cabinet meeting at Parliament House, Canberra. On approach to Canberra Airport, the aircraft crash-landed on a nearby farming property and caught on fire, with no survivors. Two RAAF investigations concluded the aircraft had stalled on approach due to pilot error, while a coronial inquest found the victims had been killed in the crash rather than the resulting fire.

The crash killed three United Australia Party (UAP) cabinet ministers – army minister Geoffrey Street, air minister James Fairbairn and scientific and industrial research minister Henry Gullett – as well as Brudenell White, the Australian Army's chief of the general staff. Prime Minister Robert Menzies subsequently reshuffled his ministry and called an early election, which resulted in a hung parliament and ultimately the government's defeat in 1941. The results of official investigations into the crash have been criticised and disputed by a number of subsequent writers.

== Background ==
The aircraft involved in the crash, military serial A16-97, was one of a batch of 100 Lockheed Hudson bombers, recently delivered to No. 1 Aircraft Depot at RAAF Base Laverton on 20 June 1940 and assigned to No. 2 Squadron RAAF. It was the first Hudson in the RAAF to be fitted out with passenger seating, to be reserved for transporting "essential maintenance stores and personnel to advanced operational bases", as well as ministerial traffic when required. On 9 August, the station administrative officer at RAAF Laverton received instructions to prepare a flight to Canberra on 13 August, to be reserved for James Fairbairn, the Minister for Air and Civil Aviation. The aircraft had 7 hours and 10 minutes of flying time, of which 2 hours and 35 minutes had been completed by Lockheed test pilots. A daily inspection was completed on the morning of the flight and signed off by the pilot Flight Lieutenant Robert Hitchcock. At 8.47 a.m. he and three crew members left RAAF Laverton for Essendon Airport.

Fairbairn had been working at his departmental headquarters in Melbourne and requested the flight in order to attend an important cabinet meeting on defence policy, which would discuss the allocation of Australian resources in the war. It had been called partially in response to a telegram from Winston Churchill to Menzies outlining his views on the prospect of war with Japan. The chiefs of staff of the army, navy and air force were also due to be in attendance. Fairbairn invited three other senior officials to join him on the flight – Geoffrey Street, Minister for the Army; Henry Gullett, Minister for Information, and General Brudenell White, Chief of the General Staff. Fairbairn's private secretary Dick Elford and White's staff officer Frank Thornthwaite were the two other passengers. Two other ministers, George McLeay and Arthur Fadden, were also invited, but declined seats as they had already arranged to take the train. Prime Minister Robert Menzies' assistant private secretary Peter Looker had reserved two seats on the flight, but Menzies also preferred to take the train.

== Crash ==
The Ministers and General White, with their staff, were being flown from Melbourne to Canberra.

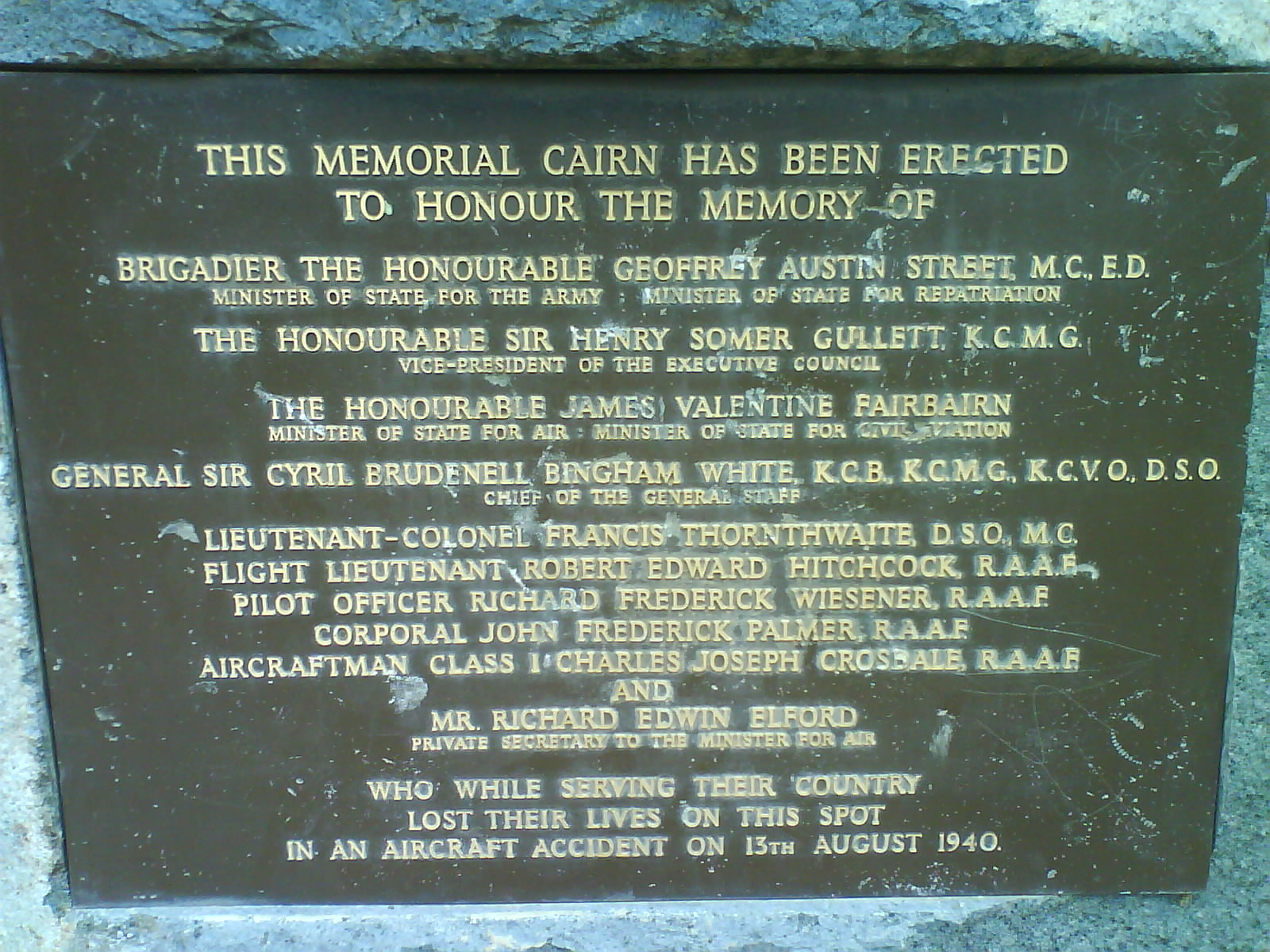
Plaque of Memorial Cairn (1960) at the site of the disaster

The Perth Daily News reported: "The plane was seen by watchers at the Canberra Aerodrome and the Air Force station to circle the drome, and then rise and head south. It disappeared behind a low tree-dotted hill. There was an explosion and a sheet of flame, followed by a dense cloud of smoke... The Canberra Fire Brigade and ambulances from Canberra and Queanbeyan, across the border in New South Wales, as well as several Air Force tenders, arrived soon afterwards and fire extinguishers were played on the blazing wreckage. After about half-an-hour, when the blaze had died down, it was seen that the entire undercarriage, wings and structural supports of the plane had been torn away and were a smouldering mass in which were the charred bodies of those on board."

The plane came down in a paddock on "Dundee", a grazing property of 888 acres (359 ha) owned by Duncan Cameron.

== Casualties ==
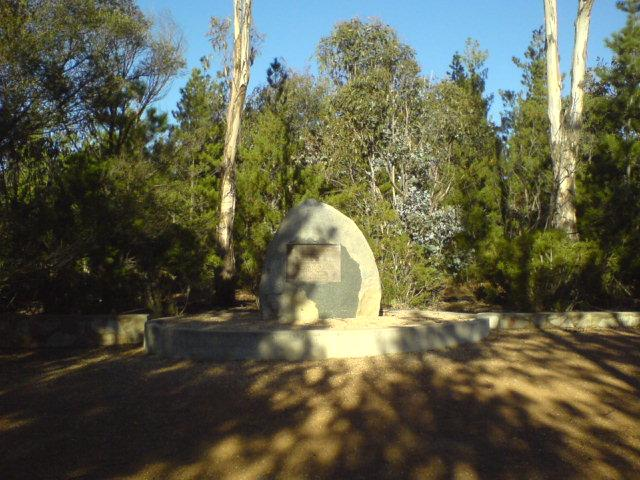
Memorial opened by Robert Menzies in 1960 (20th anniversary)

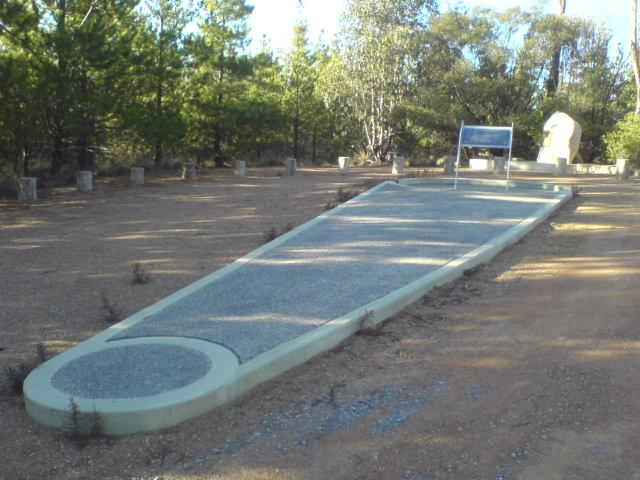
Memorial by the Government of the Australian Capital Territory in 2003, representative of the wing of a Lockheed Hudson. 1960 memorial behind

Brigadier Geoffrey Street, Minister for the Army and Repatriation. A World War I veteran who had been awarded the Military Cross, Street entered Federal Parliament in 1934 and became Minister for Defence in 1938. With the onset of World War II, Street's portfolio was split, and he became Minister for the Army. He gained the Repatriation portfolio in 1940.

James Fairbairn, Minister for Air and Civil Aviation. A pastoralist and accomplished aviator who served with the Royal Flying Corps during World War I, Fairbairn was elected to Federal Parliament in 1933 and became Minister for Civil Aviation and Vice-President of the Executive Council in 1939. He was appointed Minister for Air at the onset of World War II, and regained the Civil Aviation portfolio in 1940.

Sir Henry Gullett, Vice-President of the Executive Council and Minister in charge of Scientific and Industrial Research. A journalist until his enlistment in 1916, Gullett became Australia's official war correspondent for the AIF in Palestine in 1918. He was elected to Parliament in 1925, becoming Deputy Leader of the Opposition from 1929 to 1930, Minister for Trade and Customs from 1928 to 1929 and 1932 to 1933, Minister without portfolio from 1934 to 1937, Minister for External Affairs and Information from 1939 to 1940, and was appointed vice-president of the Executive Council in March 1940.

General Sir C. Brudenell White, Chief of the General Staff. With a background of service with Australian forces in South Africa in 1902–03, White served as Chief of Staff to Generals Bridges and Birdwood during World War I. He became Chief of the General Staff in 1920 and, in 1923, was appointed the first chairman of the Public Service Board. White returned to the Army as Chief of the General Staff in 1940.

Lieutenant Colonel Francis Thornthwaite, Staff Officer to General White. An officer in the Australian Army from 1910, Thornthwaite was awarded the Distinguished Service Order and Military Cross for his service during World War I. He was serving as Army Liaison Officer on the General Staff at the time of his death.

Richard Edwin Elford. Elford, who had a good knowledge of aeronautics, was Fairbairn's private secretary. Wanting to stay overnight in Melbourne to celebrate his first wedding anniversary, he traded places with Arthur Fadden, who instead took the overnight train.

RAAF crew:

- Flight Lieutenant Robert Edward Hitchcock
- Pilot Officer Richard Frederick Wiesener
- Corporal John Frederick Palmer
- Aircraftman Charles Joseph Crosdale

== Cause ==
The cause of the crash has always been indeterminate, although there has never been any suggestion of enemy action or sabotage. The crash took place at 10:15 a.m. in fine weather, in what the Melbourne Herald called "ideal flying conditions".

James Fairbairn had served in the Royal Flying Corps during World War I and still enjoyed flying. It has always been suspected that he may have persuaded the RAAF crew to allow him to fly the plane into Canberra. A week before the accident, Fairbairn told an Adelaide headmaster, "Hudson bombers have a rather nasty stalling characteristic.... From what I have been told, a pilot coming in to land can find himself, suddenly and without warning, in a machine that is no longer airborne, heading straight to the ground.... Personally, I think it's only a matter of handling your throttles wisely".

More recently the RAAF Historian C. D. Coulthard-Clark, in his book The Third Brother, called into question the flying ability of the pilot-in-command, Flt Lt Hitchcock. An account of his comments appears in the book Air Crash vol. 2 by Australian aviation writer Macarthur Job (Aerospace Publications, Canberra 1992). However, Andrew Tink, author of Air Disaster Canberra: the plane crash that destroyed a government (2013), was reported in 2018 as doubting whether Hitchcock had been at the controls at the time of the crash.

On 12 August 2020, the day before the 80th anniversary of the crash, Michael Wooldridge, a former Minister of the Australian Government, wrote a revelatory story in The Australian. He recalled a discussion he had with Sir Harry White, Australia's first National Librarian, whose friend, Norman Tritton, was Prime Minister Menzies' Private Secretary. Menzies sent Tritton to the crash site to find out the details. Tritton had told White that he had been allowed access to the crash site itself, and the body of Fairbairn was still strapped into the pilot's seat. Wooldridge discussed the matter with White early in his tenure as a politician, and said that White kept the secret for 50 years, and he did for another 30 years.

The account passed on by Wooldridge is contradicted by the findings of the coronial inquest, which recorded that the bodies in the plane were burned beyond recognition and had to be differentiated via the application of body identification techniques.

== Investigations ==
The Court of Inquiry into the accident found that it was most likely from the aircraft stalling on its landing approach, resulting in loss of control at a height too low to recover. The aircraft crashed into a hill with great force, killing all occupants instantly, then burning fiercely.

=== Coronial inquest ===
A coronial inquest was conducted by John Goodwin, the chairman of the Australian Capital Territory Advisory Council and the territory's acting coroner. He had been a special magistrate since 1930 and was "experienced in coronial duties". Goodwin was assisted by Thomas Mills, a representative of the Crown Solicitor's Office. Mills advised Goodwin that his jurisdiction was limited to determining the identity of the victims and their cause of death.

Goodwin's report, issued on 27 August, accepted the identification of the victims made by Duncan Mackellar, the medical superintendent of Canberra Hospital. Mackellar was a general practitioner with limited experience in forensic medicine, and faced difficulties in distinguishing between the victims' bodies which had been burned beyond recognition. The six civilian passengers were identified with the assistance of Street's private secretary Percy Hayter. Thornthwaite was identified by his personal belongings, White by his general's insignia, Street by a signet ring, and Gullett by his dentures; Fairbairn and Elford were identified by previous injuries. The four military passengers were identified with the assistance of Group Captain Douglas Wilson, who did not know them personally. Wilson used a process of elimination based on the victims' uniforms and positions within the plane.

Based on Mackellar's evidence, Goodwin concluded "I am of the opinion that the men were killed before the plane was burnt". He determined that in each case the "immediate cause of death" was a fractured skull. Mackellar had attested that it would be "fairly safe to assume that all ten men were killed when the plane hit the ground". This conclusion contradicted initial newspaper reports that the victims had been killed by the post-crash fire. There is anecdotal evidence that at least one eyewitness believed there were still people alive after the crash. (Note: Jack Butt, a local farmer and former soldier, was one of the first to arrive at the scene of the crash. According to Jo Gullett, the son of one of the victims, Butt told him that he had been "prevented from trying to save several men whom he believed were still alive". Butt's daughter Edna Byrne recalled that her father had seen men "panicking at the windows". However, Butt was never formally interviewed and this account is contradicted by the sworn testimony of several other eyewitnesses.) However, no evidence of that nature was brought before the inquest.

=== RAAF investigations ===
Being an RAAF flight, responsibility for the crash lay with the Department of Air rather than the Department of Civil Aviation and its Air Accident Investigation Committee. The RAAF's Inspectorate of Air Accidents, led by Arthur William Murphy with the assistance of Henry Winneke, submitted a report on 16 August which concluded that the immediate cause of the accident was a stall. It concluded that there was "no option but to attribute the stall to an error of judgment on the part of the pilot". The Air Board separately constituted a three-person Service Court of Inquiry led by Wing Commander Leon Lachal and assisted by Squadron Leader Frederick Stevens and Pilot Officer George Pape. Lachal's report went into more depth and consideration of technical detail, but reached the same conclusion, that the crash was "due to the aircraft stalling when approaching the aerodrome to land" and that "the accident was due to an error of judgment on the part of the pilot".

The conclusion of the Murphy and Lachal reports was immediately disputed by the RAAF's Director of Training George Jones, who stated "I cannot believe that a pilot of Hitchcock's experience would stall the aircraft under the circumstances which apparently existed".

== Effects ==
Menzies was deeply affected by the crash, both personally and politically. "This was a dreadful calamity," he told the House of Representatives the next day. "For my three colleagues were my close and loyal friends. Each of them had a place not only in the Cabinet but in my heart". Although Menzies was not in fact close to Fairbairn personally or politically, Street and Gullett were among his closest supporters, and Gullett was a trusted senior adviser. When Menzies attended a memorial gathering at the site on 12 August 1960, 20 years after the crash, he was seen to be still very emotional in recalling the day.

In the wake of the loss of three senior Cabinet ministers, Menzies was forced to reshuffle his ministry. The Cabinet was permanently weakened by their loss, and that was a factor undermining Menzies's position in the following months. One of those promoted in the reshuffle was Harold Holt, recalled from Army service and thus gaining a promotion that eventually led to the Prime Ministership.

As a general election was already due by the end of the year, it was felt prudent to call it for September, to avoid the necessity of also holding three by-elections for such a short term. At the election, Fairbairn's seat of Flinders and Street's seat of Corangamite were retained by the UAP, but Gullett's seat of Henty was lost to an independent, Arthur Coles, who was one of the two independents who voted to bring down the government in 1941 (then headed by the Country Party leader Arthur Fadden), allowing John Curtin of the Australian Labor Party to become prime minister.

== Legacy ==
In 1953, the RAAF base at Canberra was renamed Fairbairn Airbase in Fairbairn's honour. Two of the ministers were later followed into federal politics by their sons, Jo Gullett and Tony Street. After the war, a memorial cairn was erected at the site.

In April 2022 the New Zealand musician Anthonie Tonnon released a single entitled Lockheed Bomber based on the disaster.

== Gallery ==
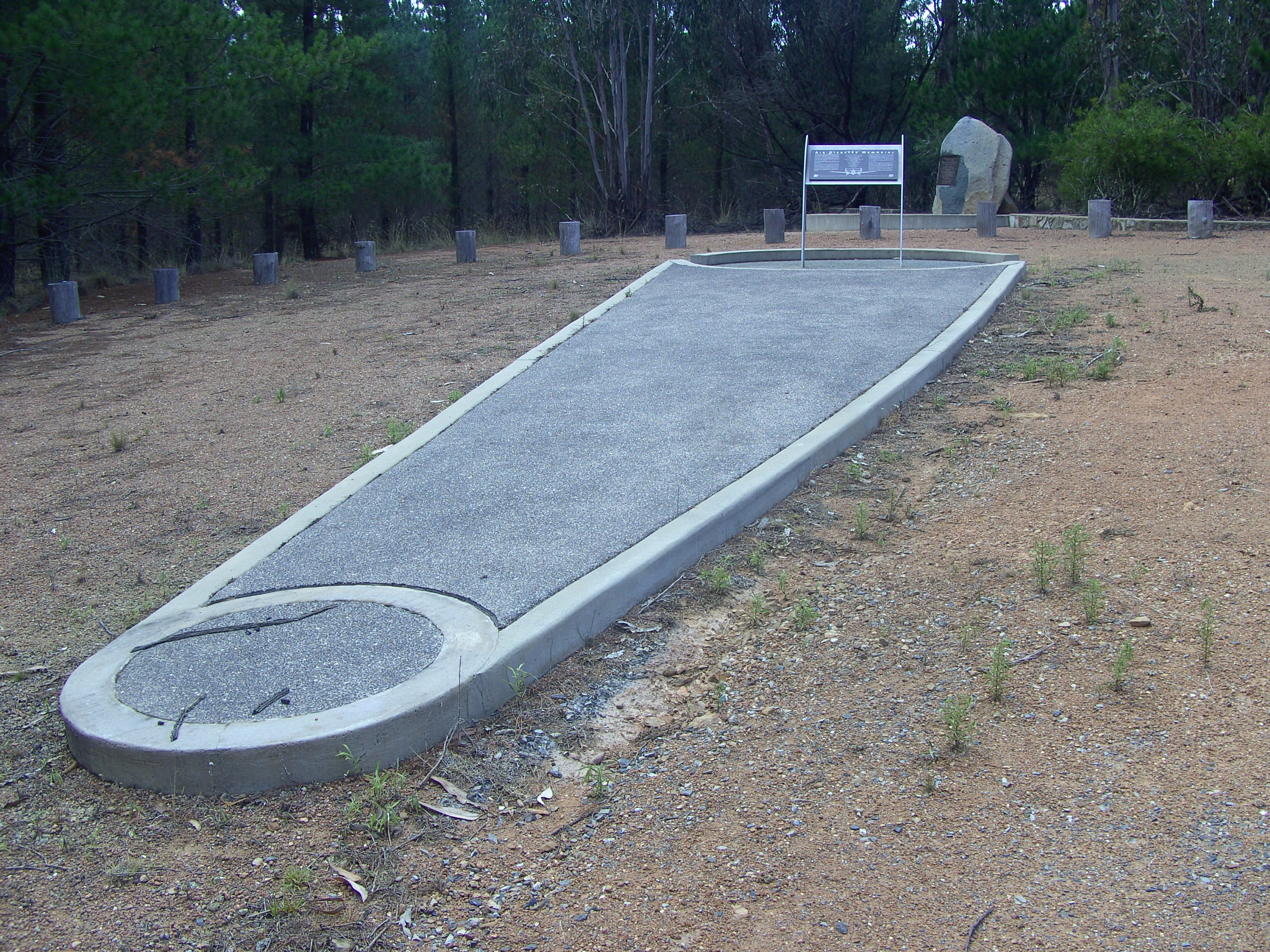
look along the 'wing'

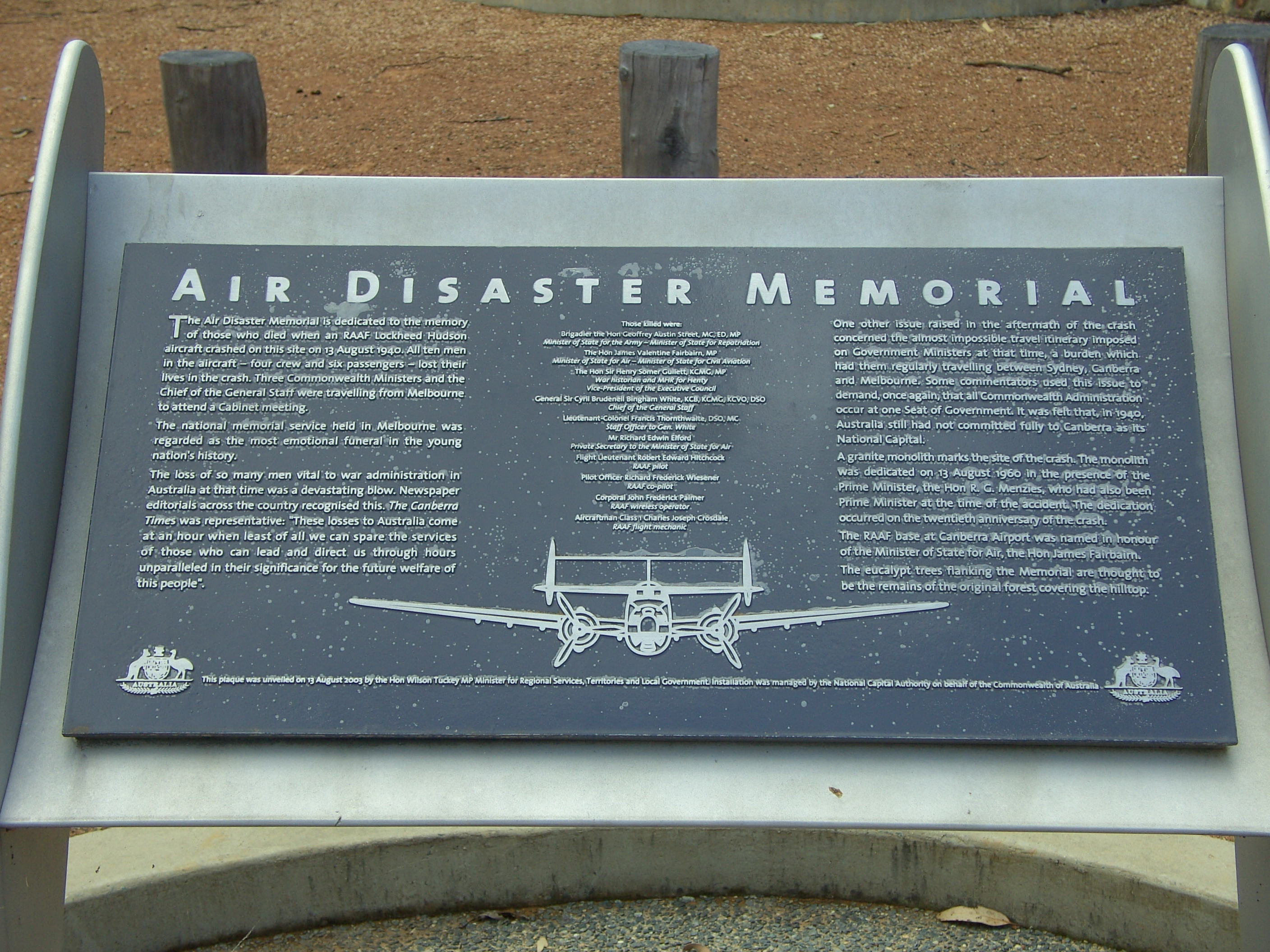
detail of new plaque

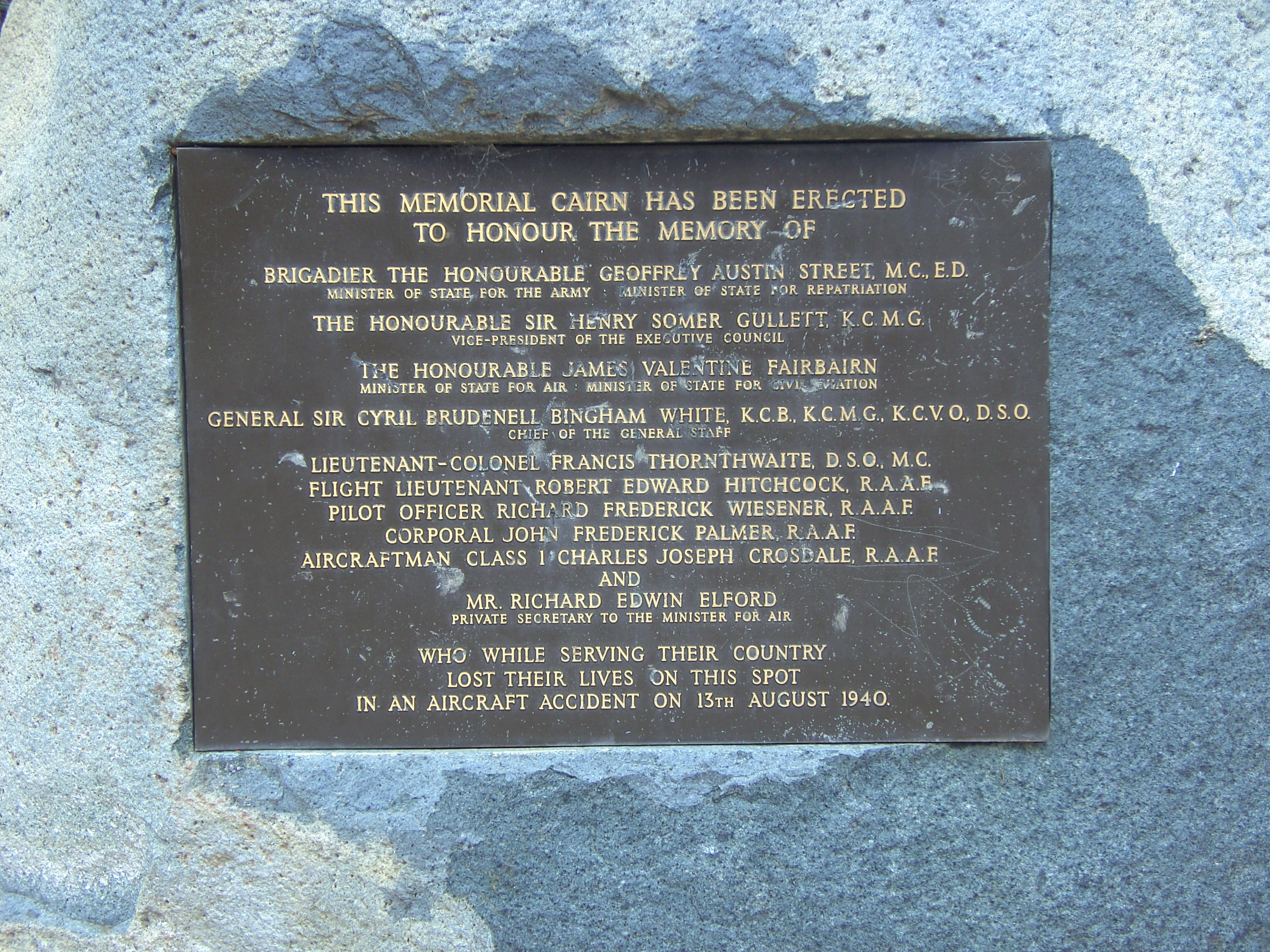
detail of old plaque (1960)

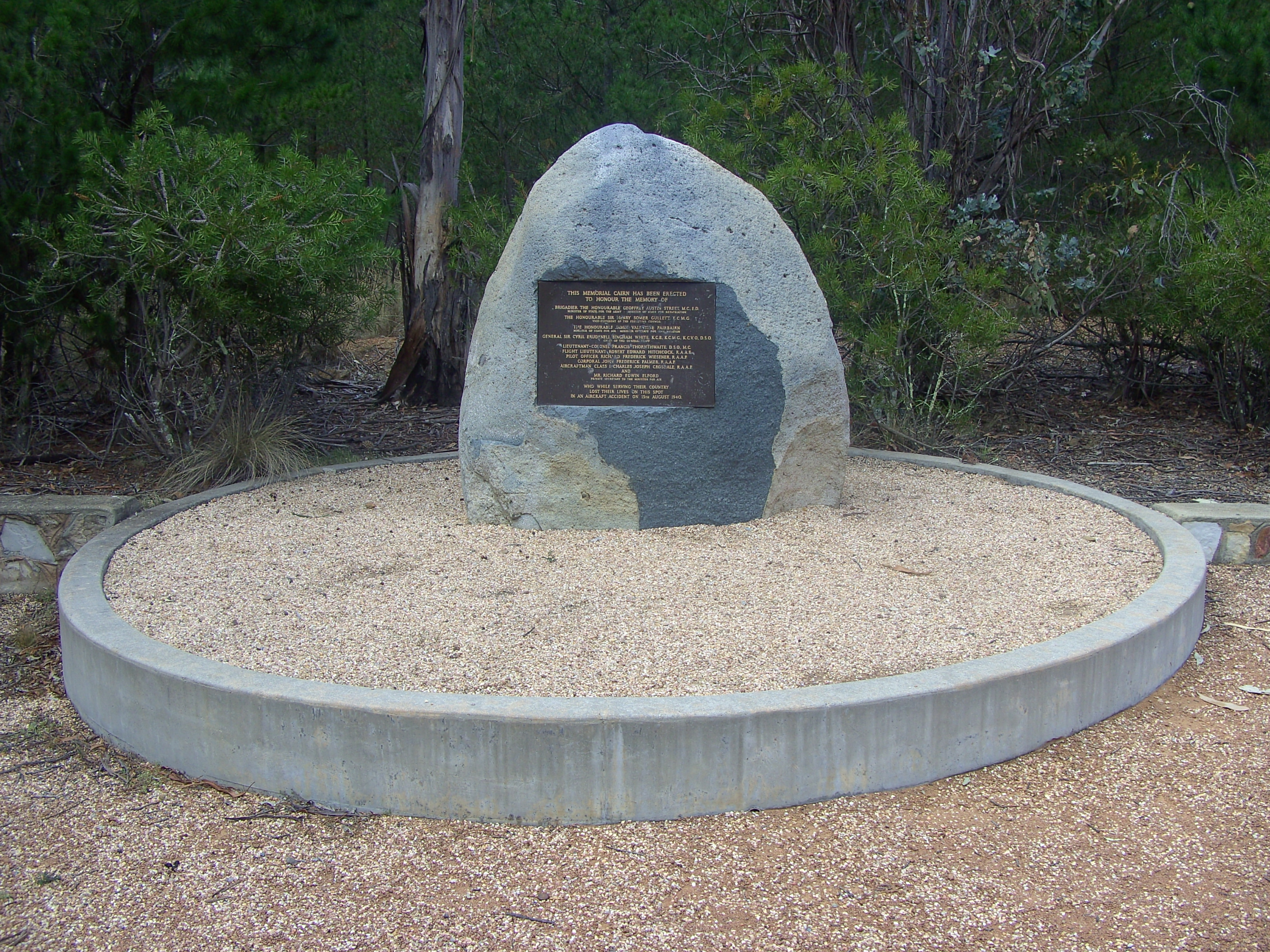
old memorial (1960)

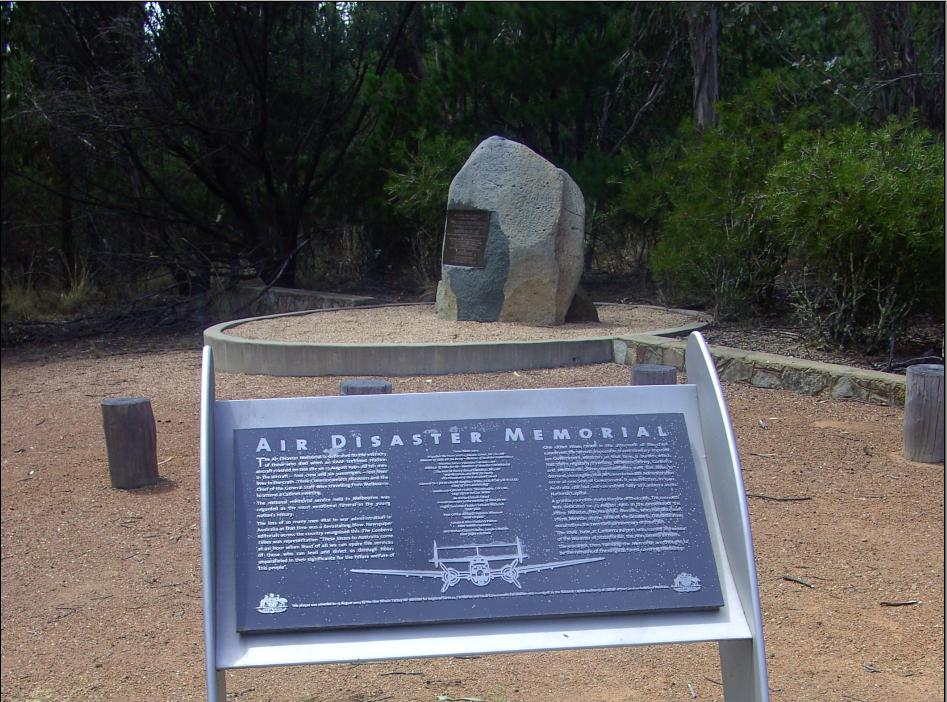
two plaques

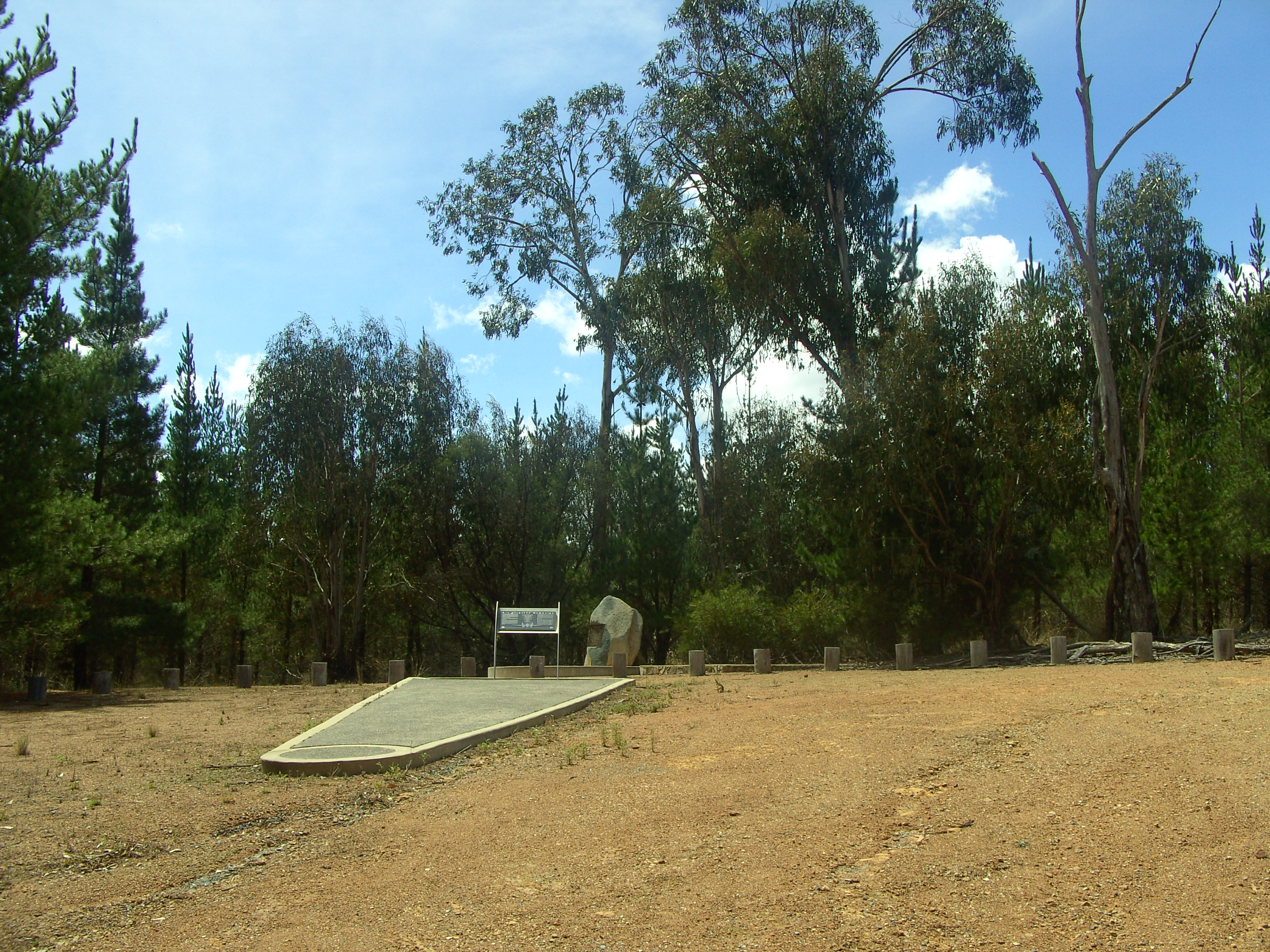
scene with old and new memorials
