= Edward Findley =

Australian politician and publisher

The Honourable Edward Findley
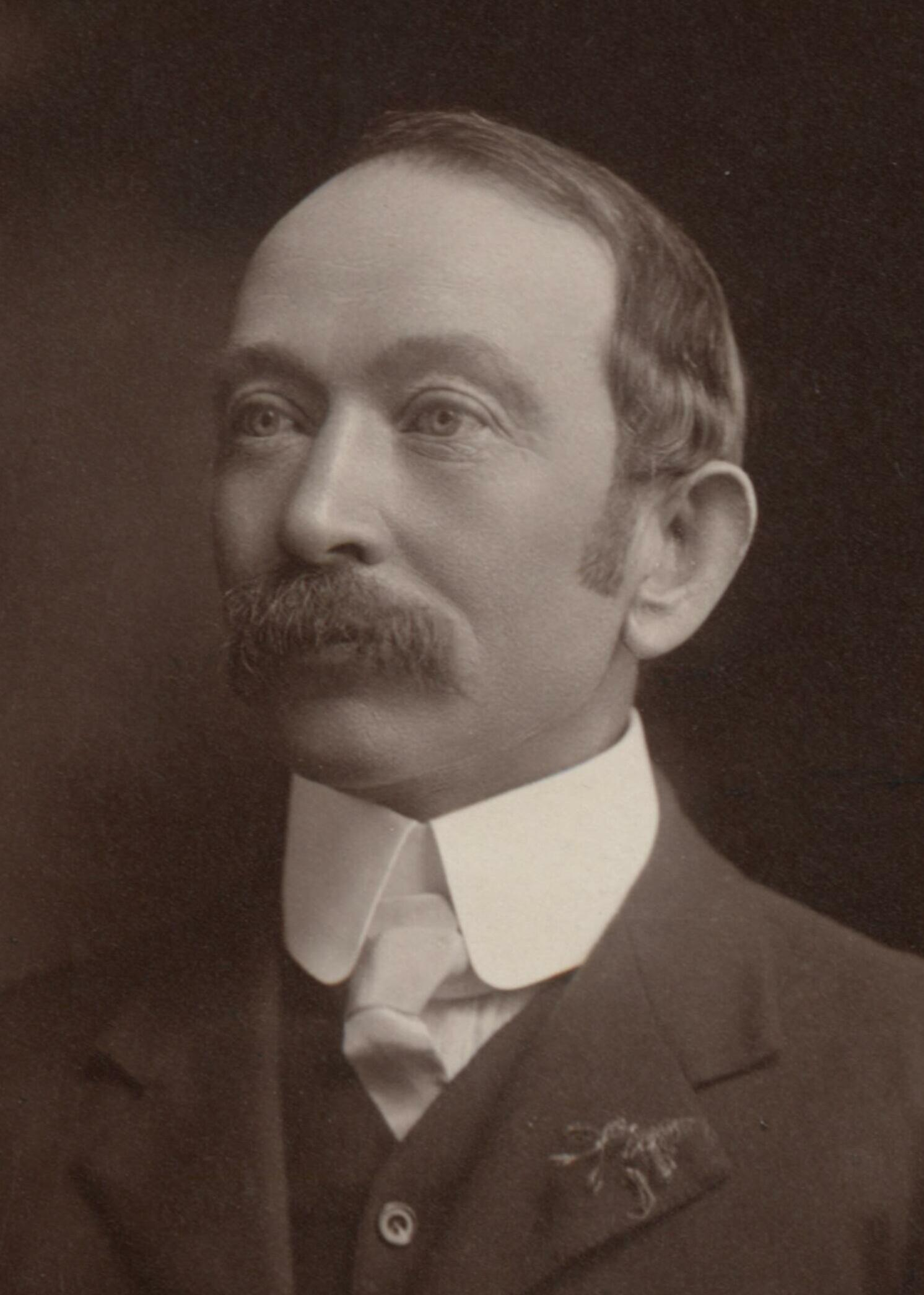

Senator for Victoria, Australia
- In office 1 January 1904 – 30 June 1917
- In office 1 July 1923 – 30 June 1929

Personal details
- Born: 8 September 1864 Bendigo, Victoria, Australia
- Died: 26 October 1947 (aged 83) Caulfield, Victoria, Australia
- Party: Australian Labor Party
- Spouse: Lilian Foyle
- Occupation: Journalist

Edward Findley (8 September 1864 – 26 October 1947) was an Australian politician and publisher. He served as a Senator for Victoria from 1904 to 1917 and from 1923 to 1929, representing the Australian Labor Party (ALP). He was also a member of the Victorian Legislative Assembly from 1900 to 1901.

== Early life ==
Findley was born in Bendigo, Victoria (then called Sandhurst), and was apprenticed as a compositor on The Bendigo Independent before moving to Melbourne in the early 1880s to work on the Daily Telegraph, which closed in 1892. He became an active unionist and was elected president of the Australasian Typographical Union in 1897. He established a weekly newspaper, The Boomerang in 1894, but it ran for only eight issues. In 1896, he helped establish the Toscin, a radical union weekly, which continued in publication until 1906.

== Political career ==
Findley was elected as an Australian Labor Party member for the Victorian Legislative Assembly seat of Melbourne in 1900, but was expelled from parliament on 25 June 1901 for seditious libel because, as editor of the Toscin, he was held responsible for republishing an article from the Dublin Irish People which was critical of King Edward VII. Findley did not stand at the ensuing by-election in his seat, instead contesting the Melbourne East by-election on the same day. He was not successful, after the number of Liberal candidates opposing him was reduced to avoid vote splitting. He also stood unsuccessfully for the seat in 1902.

Findley won a seat in the Australian Senate at the 1903 election. He was an honorary minister in the Second Fisher Ministry from 1911 to 1913, and was responsible in the Senate for matters handled by the Minister of Home Affairs and the Postmaster-General. In 1911, he married Lilian Foyle. He was defeated at the 1917 election, but returned to the Senate at the 1922 election. He was defeated again at the 1928 election.

From 1930 until his death, Findley was a government director of the Commonwealth Oil Refineries, a government-owned oil retailer, established by the Hughes Government in 1920 and sold to BP in 1952. He died in his home in the Melbourne suburb of Caulfield, survived by his wife and one of his two daughters.
