= 1901 Melbourne state by-election =

- 8 October 1909

Electoral district of Melbourne in the Victorian Legislative Assembly
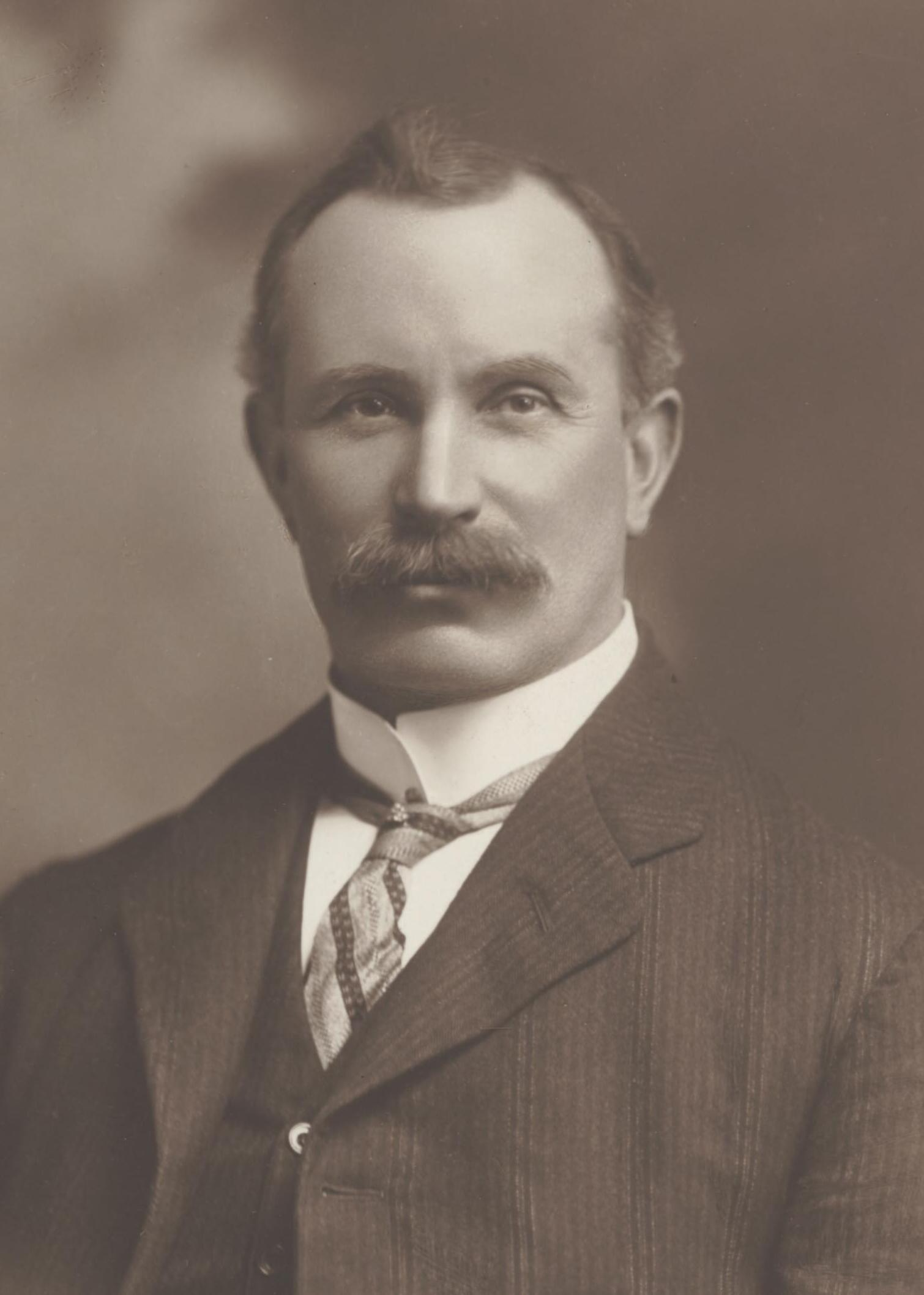
	First party	Second party
		ALP
Candidate	James Boyd	Daniel Carter
Party	Conservative	Labour
Popular vote	1,974	483
Percentage	80.3%	19.7
Swing	▲53.3	▼12.4
MP before election
Edward Findley
Labour
Elected MP
James Boyd
Conservative

The 1901 Melbourne state by-election was held on 16 July 1901 to elect the next member for Melbourne in the Victorian Legislative Assembly, following the expulsion of incumbent MP Edward Findley.

Findley, a Labour member, had been expelled from parliament for seditious libel a month prior on 25 June because, as editor of the Toscin, he was held responsible for republishing an article from the Dublin Irish People which was critical of King Edward VII. He chose to contest the Melbourne East by-election, held on the same day as the Melbourne by-election, but was unsuccessful.

The by-election was won by Conservative candidate James Boyd, who had a swing towards him of more than 50% compared to his previous result in 1900.

== Results ==
1901 Melbourne state by-election
Party	Candidate	Votes	%	±%
Conservative	James Boyd	1,974	80.3	+53.3
Labour	Daniel Carter	483	19.7	−12.4
Total formal votes		2,457	99.98	
Informal votes		4	0.02	
Turnout		2,461	51.1	
Conservative gain from Labour		Swing		
