= Division of Henty =

Former Australian federal electoral division

Henty Australian House of Representatives Division
- Created: 1913
- Abolished: 1990
- Namesake: Henty family

The Division of Henty was an Australian Electoral Division in Victoria. The division was created in 1913 and abolished in 1990. It was named for the Henty family of Portland, the first European settlers in Victoria. It was located in the south eastern suburbs of Melbourne, including at various times Brighton, Caulfield, Malvern and Oakleigh. For most of its history it was a safe seat for the Liberal Party and its predecessors. A 1969 redistribution cut the seat back to the Oakleigh area, and from then on it was somewhat more marginal. In 1974 it elected Joan Child, the first female Labor member of the House of Representatives and the first female Speaker.

== Members ==
Image	Member	Party	Term	Notes
	James Boyd (1867–1941)	Liberal	31 May 1913 – 17 February 1917	Previously held the Victorian Legislative Assembly seat of Melbourne. Lost seat
	James Boyd (1867–1941)	Nationalist	17 February 1917 – 13 December 1919	Previously held the Victorian Legislative Assembly seat of Melbourne. Lost seat
	Frederick Francis (1881–1949)	Independent Nationalist	13 December 1919 – 1922	Retired
	Frederick Francis (1881–1949)	Nationalist	1922 – 3 October 1925	Retired
	Sir Henry Gullett (1878–1940)	Nationalist	14 November 1925 – 7 May 1931	Served as minister under Bruce, Lyons, Page and Menzies. Died in office. Son was Jo Gullett
	Sir Henry Gullett (1878–1940)	United Australia	7 May 1931 – 13 August 1940	Served as minister under Bruce, Lyons, Page and Menzies. Died in office. Son was Jo Gullett
	Arthur Coles (1889–1982)	Independent	21 September 1940 – 26 June 1941	Resigned to retire from politics
	Arthur Coles (1889–1982)	United Australia	26 June 1941 – 3 October 1941	Resigned to retire from politics
	Arthur Coles (1889–1982)	Independent	3 October 1941 – 30 March 1946	Resigned to retire from politics
	Jo Gullett (1914–1999)	Liberal	30 March 1946 – 4 November 1955	Served as Chief Government Whip in the House under Menzies. Retired. Father was Sir Henry Gullett
	Max Fox (1912–1988)	Liberal	10 December 1955 – 18 May 1974	Served as Chief Government Whip in the House under Gorton and McMahon. Lost seat
	Joan Child (1921–2013)	Labor	18 May 1974 – 13 December 1975	Lost seat
	Ken Aldred (1945–2016)	Liberal	13 December 1975 – 18 October 1980	Lost seat. Later elected to the Division of Bruce in 1983
	Joan Child (1921–2013)	Labor	18 October 1980 – 19 February 1990	Served as Speaker during the Hawke Government. Retired after Henty was abolished in 1990
