= James Boyd (Australian politician) =

Australian politician (1867–1941)

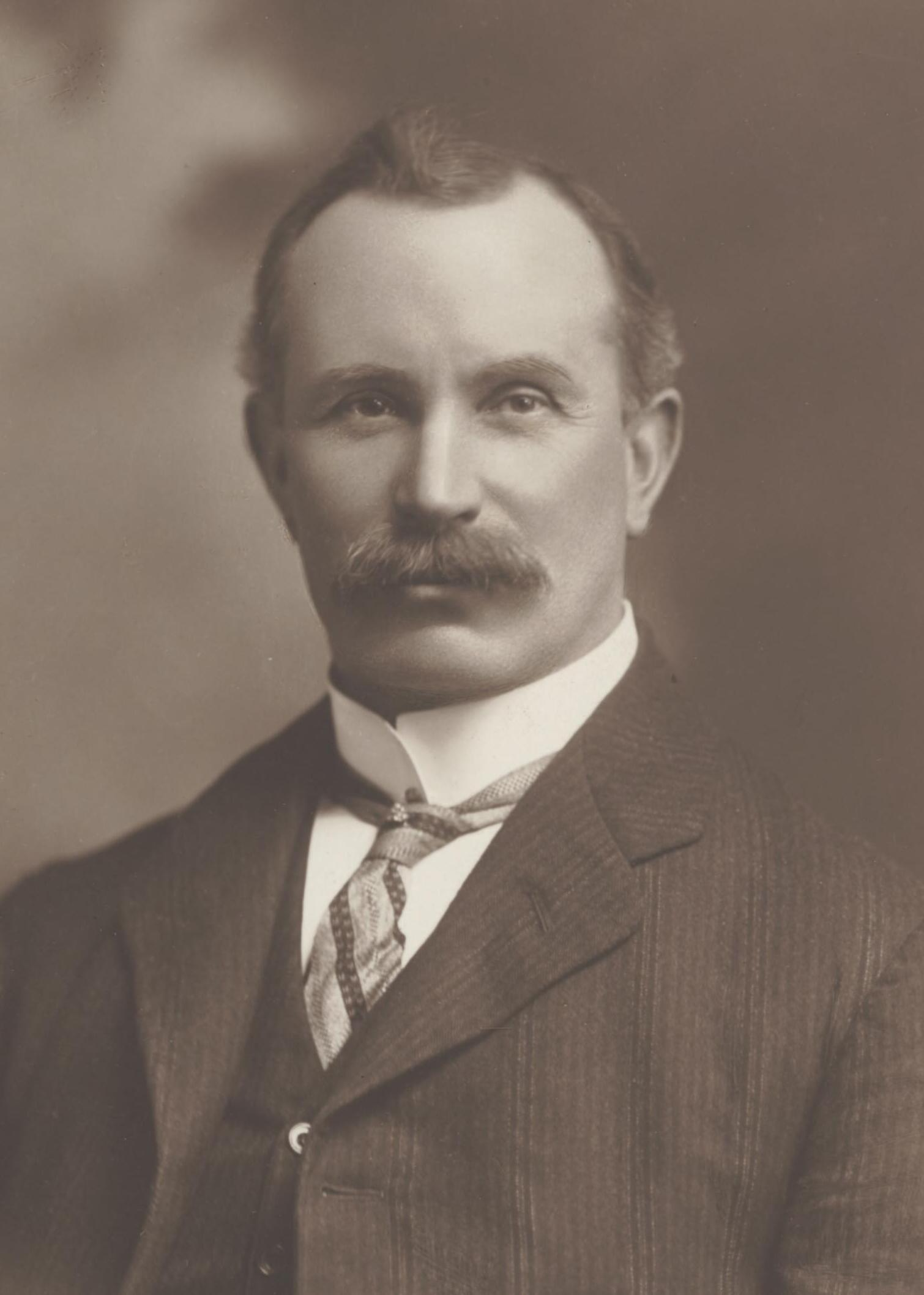

Member of the Australian Parliament for Henty
- In office 31 May 1913 – 13 December 1919
- Preceded by: New seat
- Succeeded by: Frederick Francis

Personal details
- Born: 7 July 1867 Portsea, Hampshire, England
- Died: 12 April 1941 (aged 73) Melbourne, Victoria, Australia
- Party: Liberal (1913–17); Nationalist (1917–19)
- Occupation: Local councillor

James Arthur Boyd (7 July 1867 – 12 April 1941) was an Australian politician. Born in Portsea, Hampshire, his family moved to Ayrshire in Scotland around 1869. He was educated at St John's Academy in Glasgow before becoming an apprentice painter. He migrated to Melbourne, Victoria, in 1885, where he had many occupations, and was a councillor on Port Melbourne Council.

In 1901, he was elected to the Victorian Legislative Assembly for the seat of Melbourne as a Conservative at a by-election. He was an Honorary Minister 1907–08. In 1908 he left the Assembly and, in 1913, he was elected to the Australian House of Representatives as the Liberal member for the new seat of Henty. In 1917, the Liberal Party merged with the National Labor Party to become the Nationalist Party, of which Boyd became a member.

Boyd held his seat until 1919, when he was defeated by independent Nationalist Frederick Francis, despite having almost doubled Francis's primary vote. He became a businessman after leaving politics, and was President of the Melbourne Chamber of Commerce 1920–1922, and of the Associated Chambers of Australia in 1922–1923.

Boyd married Emma Flora McCormack on 5 January 1894 at Flemington. They had two daughters, Alva who became a medical practitioner, and Esna who became an Australian tennis champion. Boyd died of coronary vascular disease on 12 April 1941.

Parliament of Australia
Preceded by New seat	Member for Henty; 1913–1919	Succeeded by Frederick Francis
