= Frederick Francis (Australian politician) =

Australian politician

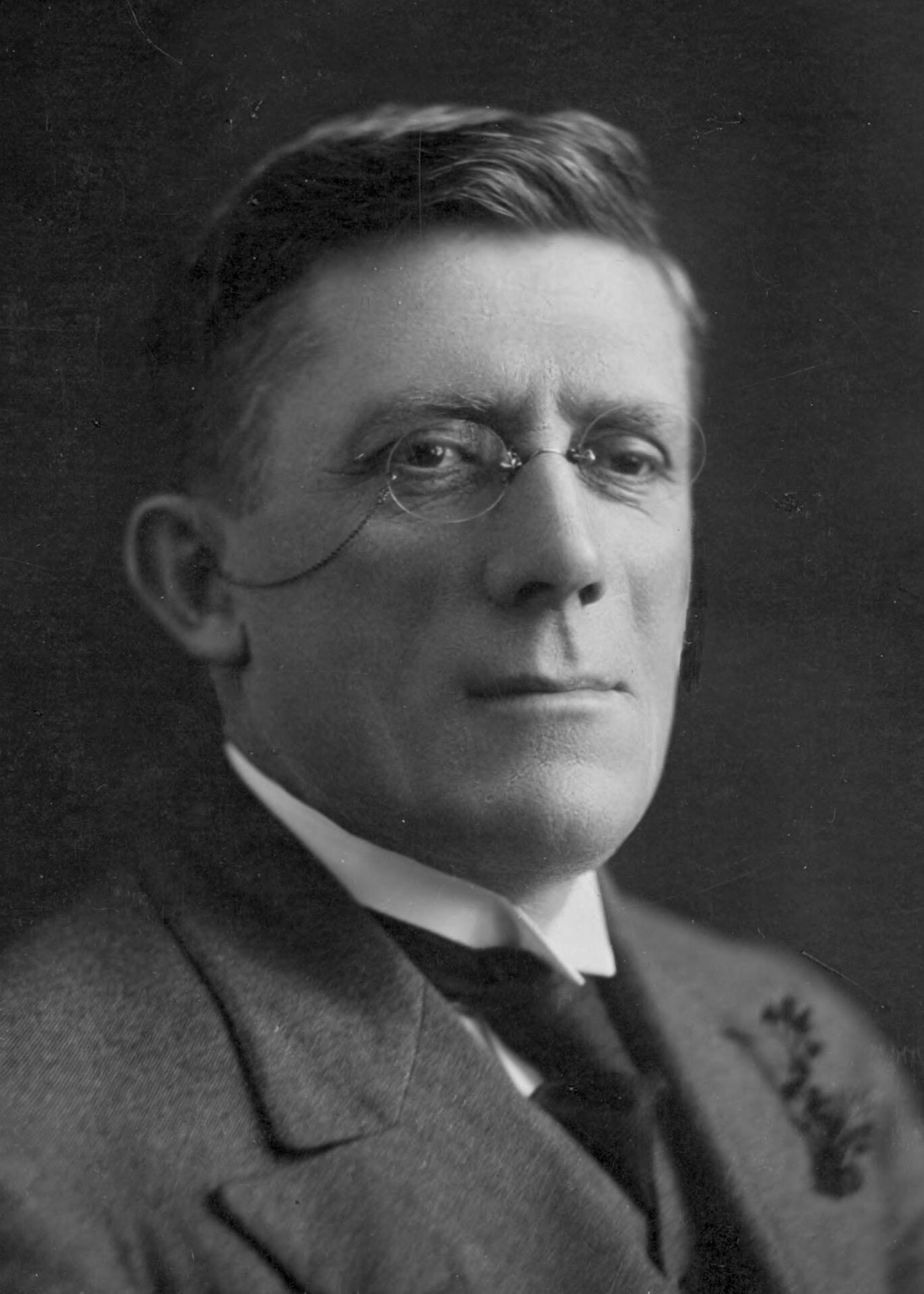

Member of the Australian Parliament for Henty
- In office 13 December 1919 – 3 October 1925
- Preceded by: James Boyd
- Succeeded by: Henry Gullett

Personal details
- Born: 1881 Melbourne, Victoria
- Died: 15 August 1949 (aged 67)
- Party: Independent (1919–22); Nationalist (1922–25)
- Occupation: Builder

Frederick Henry Francis (1881 – 15 August 1949) was an Australian politician. He was a member of the House of Representatives from 1919 to 1925, representing the Victorian seat of Henty as a Nationalist-aligned independent. He also served a term as mayor of the City of Malvern.

== Early life ==
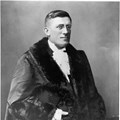
Francis in mayoral robes, c. 1920

Francis was born at Port Melbourne and was a builder and then an estate agent before entering politics. He was a City of Malvern councillor for sixteen years, including a stint as mayor. He was also a justice of the peace. He had attempted to enlist in World War I but was rejected. He was an unsuccessful candidate at the 1917 state election.

== Federal politics ==
In 1919, he contested the Australian House of Representatives seat of Henty as an independent Nationalist and defeated the sitting Nationalist MP, James Boyd, on Labor preferences. Despite his independent candidacy, he was reported to be a strong supporter of Nationalist Prime Minister Billy Hughes. He was re-elected in 1922 as a loosely-aligned Nationalist, he was formally endorsed and described himself as a "progressive Nationalist to the backbone" but stating that he would not respond to the party whip and would vote his conscience; he was alternately described as independent Nationalist or Nationalist in different sources. He defeated three Nationalist candidates, including Boyd.

Prior to the 1925 election, Francis announced that he would not re-contest Henty and would attempt to transfer to the Senate. He was not endorsed by the National Federation and stated his opposition to preselection. However, he rejected the labels "independent" or "independent Nationalist", stating that he was a Nationalist candidate. Francis eventually withdrew his Senate candidacy "to avoid splitting the Nationalist vote". He unsuccessfully contested the 1929 Balaclava by-election as an independent Nationalist, losing to endorsed Nationalist Thomas White by a large margin.

== Later life ==
Francis faced financial difficulties after leaving parliament. He built a garage and operated it for two years, but was unsuccessful and left with heavy debts. He later worked as a taxi driver, at the State Bank of Victoria, and as an agent for an undertaker, working on commission and living rent-free behind the premises. He was declared bankrupt in February 1936.

Francis died on 15 August 1949, aged 67, survived by two daughters. He was buried at the Old Cheltenham Cemetery.

Parliament of Australia
Preceded by James Boyd	Member for Henty; 1919 – 1925	Succeeded by Henry Gullett
