= Max Fox =

Australian politician (1912–1988)

Max Fox CBE
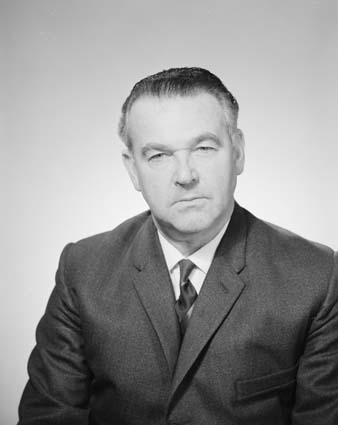

Member of the Australian Parliament for Henty
- In office 10 December 1955 – 18 May 1974
- Preceded by: Jo Gullett
- Succeeded by: Joan Child

Personal details
- Born: 27 April 1912 Oakleigh, Victoria, Australia
- Died: 27 November 1988 (aged 76)
- Party: Liberal
- Spouse: Edna Bowra (m. 1936)
- Occupation: Clerk

Edmund Maxwell Cameron Fox, CBE (27 April 1912 – 27 November 1988) was an Australian politician. He was a member of the Liberal Party and served in the House of Representatives from 1955 to 1974. He was the party's chief whip from 1969 to 1974.

== Early life ==
Fox was born on 27 April 1912 in Oakleigh, Victoria. He was educated at state schools before becoming a clerk and salesman. At the time of his election to parliament he was working as a manufacturers' agent.

Fox enlisted in the Royal Australian Air Force (RAAF) in March 1942. He trained as a wireless maintenance mechanic. He was promoted to corporal in December 1942 and to sergeant in April 1944, receiving his discharge in December 1945.

== Politics ==
Fox stood unsuccessfully for the Liberal and Country Party at the 1955 state election, losing to the incumbent Australian Labor Party MP Val Doube in the seat of Oakleigh.

Fox was elected to the House of Representatives at the 1955 federal election, retaining the seat of Henty for the Liberal Party following the retirement of Jo Gullett. He was re-elected on six further occasions. He eventually lost his seat to Labor candidate Joan Child at the 1974 election, one of only two Liberal MPs to lose their seats to Labor at the election.

In 1969, Fox was appointed as the Liberal Party's House whip, a position he maintained until his parliamentary defeat under Liberal leaders John Gorton, William McMahon, and Billy Snedden. He chaired the House Select Committee on Naming of Electoral Divisions from 1968 to 1969, the House Select Committee on Wildlife Conservation from 1970 to 1972, and the House Select Committee on Road Safety from 1972 to 1973. He was also chairman of the Commonwealth Immigration Planning Council from 1967 to 1973 and a parliamentary representative on the Parliamentary Retiring Allowances Trust and Australian Institute of Aboriginal Studies.

=== Positions and views ===
In 1966, following an incident where Australian flags were burned outside The Lodge, Fox called for the Flags Act 1953 to be amended to ban defiling the national flag.

Fox was critical of the kangaroo industry, particularly what he described as the "wholesale slaughter" of kangaroo shooting. He lobbied the federal government for a ban on the export of kangaroo products, reportly submitting a total of 54 petitions on the subject across two years. In 1971, he was described by The Bulletin as "the leader of the kangaroo lobby".

Fox was a supporter of increased immigration to Australia. He asked parliamentary questions on behalf of the Jewish community on a number of occasions, requesting intervention by the federal government on behalf of Jews facing antisemitism in Syria and the Soviet Union.

== Personal life ==
Fox married Edna Bowra in 1936. He died on 27 November 1988, aged 76.

Parliament of Australia
| Preceded by Jo Gullett | Member for Henty; 1955 – 1974 | Succeeded by Joan Child |
