= Joan Child =

Australian politician (1921–2013)

The Honourable Joan Child AO
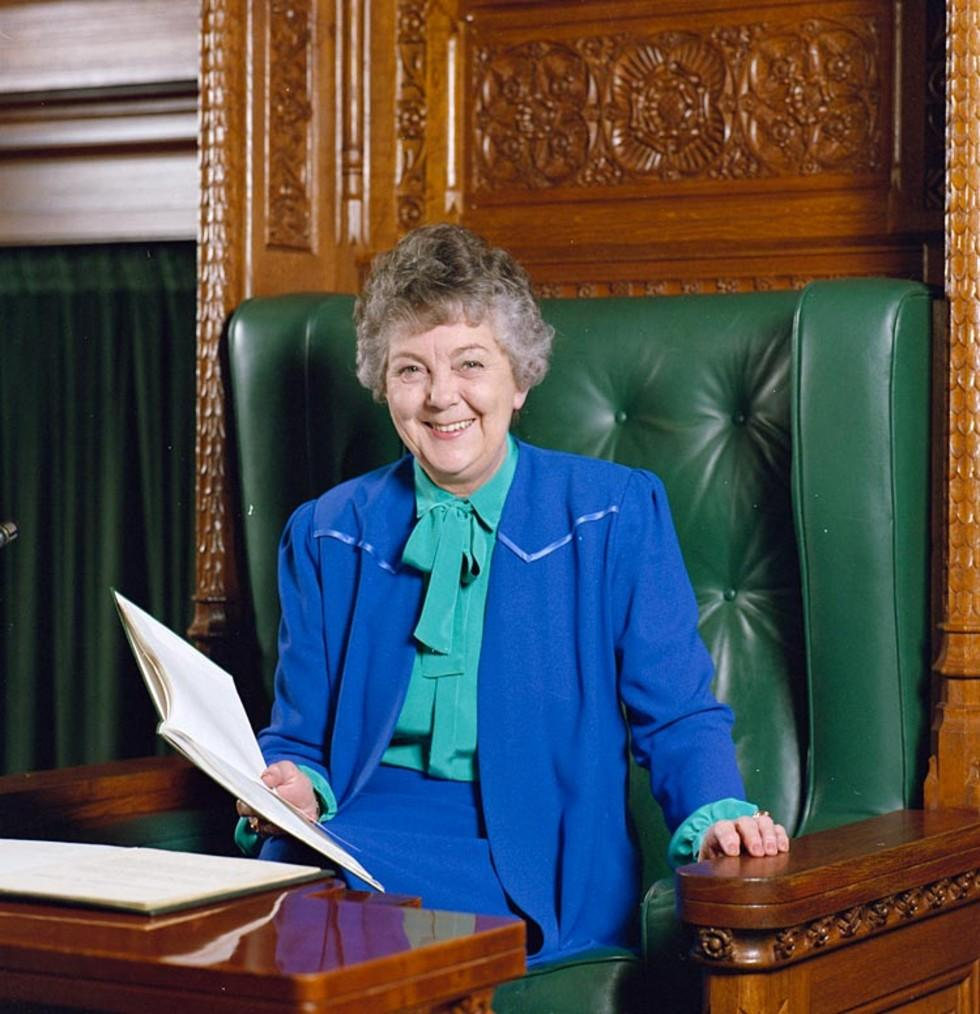
- Child as Speaker in 1987 (at Old Parliament House)

19th Speaker of the Australian House of Representatives
- In office 11 February 1986 – 28 August 1989
- Preceded by: Harry Jenkins Sr.
- Succeeded by: Leo McLeay

Member of the Australian Parliament for Henty
- In office 18 May 1974 – 13 December 1975
- Preceded by: Max Fox
- Succeeded by: Ken Aldred
- In office 18 October 1980 – 19 February 1990
- Preceded by: Ken Aldred
- Succeeded by: Division abolished

Personal details
- Born: Gloria Joan Liles Olle; 3 August 1921 Kew, Victoria, Australia
- Died: 23 February 2013 (aged 91) Melbourne, Australia
- Party: Labor
- Spouse: Harold Child (m. 1942; died 1963)

Gloria Joan Liles Child, AO (née Olle; 3 August 1921 – 23 February 2013) was an Australian politician. She was the first woman to be Speaker of the Australian House of Representatives. Up until the election of Anna Burke on 9 October 2012, she was the only female Speaker of the lower house. She was also the last Speaker to serve in the Old Parliament House, as the newly constructed Parliament House still in use today opened in 1988, under her Speakership.

== Early life ==
Child was born on 3 August 1921 in Kew, Victoria. She was the youngest of three children born to Hilda Cary (née Seedsman) and Arthur Liles Olle. Her father was a postmaster.

Child spent her early years in country Victoria, living in Yackandandah and Beechworth. Her family moved to Melbourne in 1932, settling in St Kilda East. She attended Camberwell Girls Grammar School, leaving school at the age of 15 and finding work as a receptionist.

Child married in 1942 and lived for periods in Melbourne and Launceston, Tasmania, where her husband was state manager for Nylex. She worked part-time in advertising while raising a family. Her husband died suddenly in 1963 and she subsequently worked as a house cleaner, nursing home cook and factory worker to support her family, in addition to receiving a small widow's pension. She was active in parents and citizens' associations and other community groups.

== Politics ==
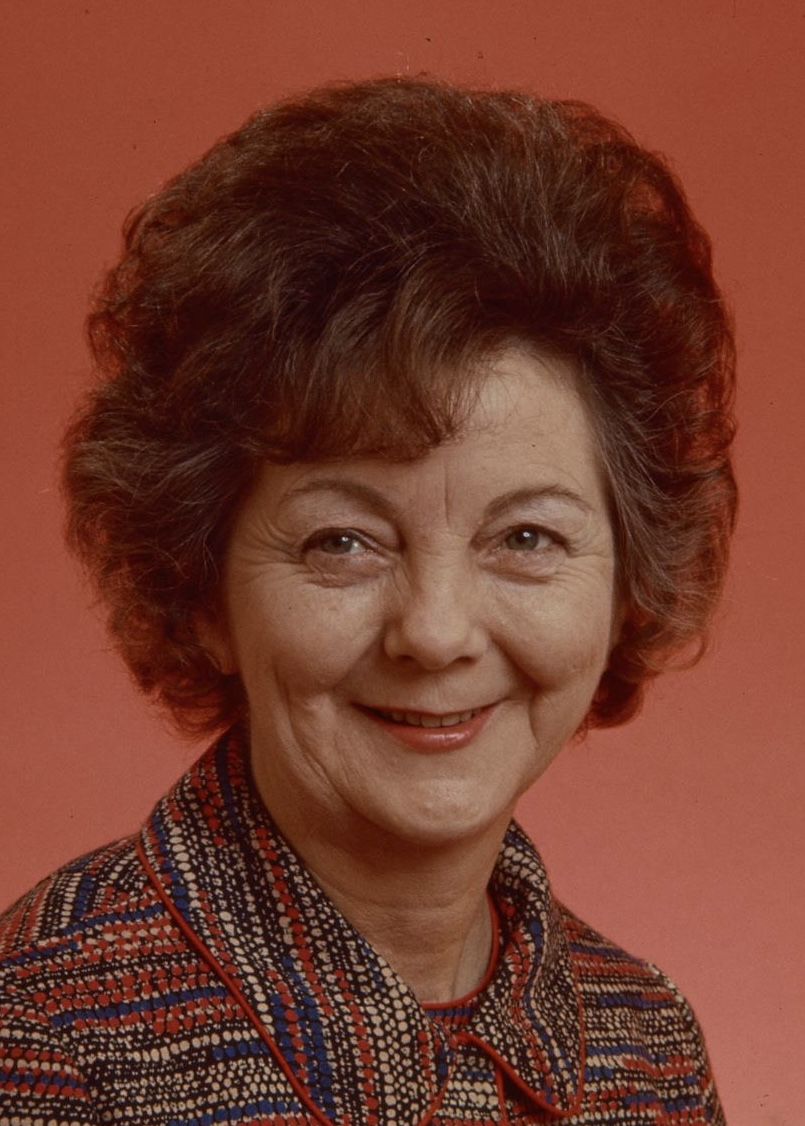
Child in 1974

Child became a member of the Australian Labor Party (ALP) in 1964, having previously campaigned for the party while living in Tasmania. She became secretary of the party's Glenhuntly branch, serving as a delegate to the ALP state council in Victoria from 1970 to 1973. She was also active in the Union of Australian Women.

Child first stood for parliament at the 1972 federal election, narrowly losing to the incumbent Liberal MP Max Fox in the seat of Henty. She attracted media attention as one of the few female candidates endorsed by a major party and was profiled in The Australian Women's Weekly. She subsequently worked as a liaison officer for overseas trade minister Jim Cairns. Child reprised her candidacy against Fox at the 1974 election and was elected as the member for Henty. She was the first woman to represent the ALP in the House of Representatives and only the fourth woman ever elected, after Enid Lyons, Doris Blackburn and Kay Brownbill.

In her maiden speech, Child spoke on social justice, a theme she regularly revisited in parliamentary speeches. She was defeated by Liberal candidate Ken Aldred after a single term at the 1975 election, as part of a nationwide swing against the Whitlam government. She recontested Henty unsuccessfully against Aldred at the 1977 election. During her absence from parliament she worked part-time as a staffer for ALP frontbencher Clyde Holding and as an executive officer for the State College of Victoria's staff association.

Child reclaimed Henty from Aldred at the 1980 election and would be re-elected on three further occasions prior to her retirement from parliament at the 1990 election. She was elected chairman of committees (deputy speaker) in February 1984, following the resignation of Les Johnson.

=== Speaker, 1986–1989 ===
During the second term of Labor Prime Minister Bob Hawke, Child became Speaker on 11 February 1986 as the sole nominee of the ALP, and was elected by 78 votes to 64 over her opponent, Allan Rocher. She was re-elected Speaker after the 1987 election, winning against Don Dobie. She was liked and respected by MPs from both sides of the Chamber, but she found the notorious rowdyism of Australian parliamentary conduct difficult to deal with, and her health suffered under the strain. In August 1989, aged 68, she resigned from the role and announced she would not contest the 1990 election.

Among the most notable events of her term in office was when the Provisional Parliament House was closed and the new Parliament House was opened on 9 May 1988, and first sat on 22 August. Some discussion took place as to whether the old Speaker's Chair, which had been a gift from the Parliament of the United Kingdom, should be installed in the new building; but Child, as Speaker, refused to move the chair. She left the House of Representatives at the 1990 election, when the seat of Henty was abolished.

== Personal life ==
In 1942, Child married Harold "Hal" Child, a World War II serviceman; the couple had five sons together. She was widowed in 1963.

After leaving politics, Child worked as a public relations consultant and was a long-serving patron of the Epilepsy Foundation of Victoria. She died in Melbourne on 23 February 2013, aged 91. A state funeral was held on 5 March.

== Honours ==
In the 1990 Birthday Honours, Child was appointed an Officer of the Order of Australia. She was inducted onto the Victorian Honour Roll of Women in 2001.

Parliament of Australia
Preceded by Harry Jenkins Sr.	Speaker of the Australian House of Representatives; 1986–1989	Succeeded by Leo McLeay
Preceded by Max Fox	Member for Henty; 1974–1975	Succeeded by Ken Aldred
Preceded by Ken Aldred	Member for Henty; 1980–1990	Division abolished
