= Jo Gullett =

Australian politician

Jo Gullett AM, MC
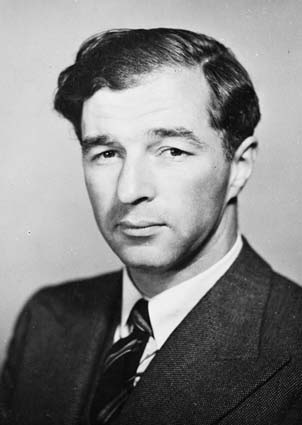

Member of the Australian Parliament for Henty
- In office 30 March 1946 – 4 November 1955
- Preceded by: Arthur Coles
- Succeeded by: Max Fox

Personal details
- Born: 16 December 1914
- Died: 24 August 1999 (aged 84)
- Party: Liberal Party of Australia
- Spouse: Ruth Mary Coleman
- Children: 4
- Education: Geelong Grammar, Oxford University and the Sorbonne
- Occupation: Journalist, soldier, politician, grazier and diplomat

Henry Baynton Somer "Jo" Gullett, AM, MC (16 December 1914 – 24 August 1999) was an Australian soldier, politician, grazier, diplomat and journalist. He served with distinction in the Australian Army during World War II, was a controversial Liberal member of the Australian House of Representatives for the Division of Henty, from 1946 to 1955. Gullett served as the Australian ambassador to Greece from 1965 to 1968, during 'the time of the Colonels'.

He was the son of former Cabinet Minister Sir Henry Somer Gullett, the grandson of author Barbara Baynton and an uncle of actor Penne Hackforth-Jones.

He is the author of two memoirs, one of which, Not as a Duty Only: an Infantryman's War is widely considered to be a classic in Australian war writing.

== Early life ==
He was born in Britain to Australian-born parents Henry Gullett and his wife Elizabeth Penelope née Frater. His father was working in London at the time as a journalist. He and his mother returned to Australia in 1919, his father being delayed in London. His father soon joined them and for the next four years they lived in a succession of rented houses and Toorak and South Yarra in Melbourne.

He was educated at Melbourne Grammar School till 1929 when the family, which by now included a daughter, moved to Canberra. He was then sent to Geelong Grammar as a boarder to complete his secondary education.

Gullett spent some of his early childhood in Canberra, at Hill Station (which much later became an upmarket restaurant) in what is now the industrial suburb of Hume. The plains of the Tuggeranong Valley allowed him to develop a passion for horseriding, and he became a keen horseman.

After leaving Geelong Grammar he spent a year at the Sorbonne and then commenced at Oxford, where took a BA degree. In 1935 he began work as a journalist in Melbourne at The Herald newspaper, where he stayed for the next four years.

== War service ==
He enlisted in the Army upon the outbreak of war in 1939, as a private. Much of his service was with the 2/6th Australian Infantry Battalion of the 6th Division of the Australian Imperial Force. As a sergeant, he was seriously wounded in the Battle of Bardia on 3 January 1941. He is the central character in an Ivor Hele painting of the battle which has hung in the Australian War Memorial since the 1960s.

Upon recovery from his wounds, he returned to his battalion as a lieutenant for the disastrous Greek campaign, and then travelled with the Battalion to New Guinea. He was awarded the Military Cross in 1943, for his "disregard of danger and [for] leadership" as a captain and company commander at Wau".

For a time thereafter he was attached to Australian Headquarters in London. As a supernumerary officer with the 8th Battalion Royal Scots, he became the first Australian soldier to land on the beach during the Invasion of Normandy on D-Day. Due to the very high officer casualty rate, he was soon appointed as a company commander with the Royal Scots, and served in this role until he was further wounded in July 1944.

After recovery from his latest wounds, he returned to Australia and attempted to rejoin the 2/6th in New Guinea, but was thwarted by higher command, who ordered that he be restrained – by force if necessary – from embarking. Accordingly, he saw no further action and was demobilised from the Army with the rank of major at the end of the war.

Over 30 years later he wrote a personal account of his war experiences entitled Not As a Duty Only, which has been on the reading lists of several Australian military higher training institutions for many years.

He married Ruth Mary Colman in Melbourne in 1945 and the couple had 4 children.

== Political and diplomatic career ==
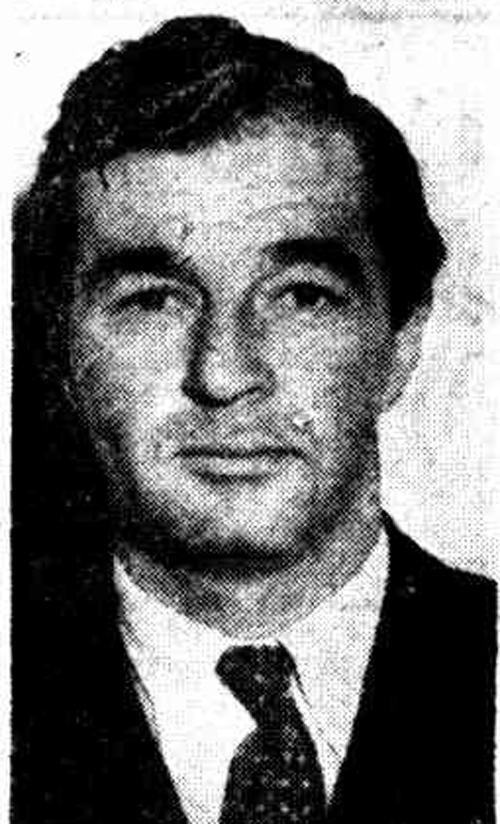
Gullett in 1946

He first stood for parliament, while still in uniform, in 1943, for his father's old seat of Henty, but was unsuccessful. Prime Minister Robert Menzies, in a confidential report to his colleagues about the defeat of his party in the election, laid out what he saw as the reasons for the loss. Among these was his belief that,

As usual, we were much too late in our selection of important candidates. There can be little doubt that if Captain Gullett had been selected a month earlier he would have won Henty handsomely.

In 1946 he stood as a Liberal Party candidate at a by-election for his father's of old seat of Henty, and this time was elected. After the Liberal-led coalition gained power at the 1949 general election, he was appointed Chief Government Whip.

He was a fierce anti-communist, and in the early 1950s was a spearhead of Parliamentary moves against Communists and Communist sympathisers within the Public Service and the wider community. His attacks are considered by some to have descended to the level of smear. For example, he described the contribution to foreign relations of John Burton, the former Permanent Secretary of the Department of External Affairs as being 'almost wholly evil'. As a further example, in 1952 he attacked certain academics at the Australian National University on the floor of Parliament and claimed that the university was 'more famous for its left wing politics than for its research'.

He also held a strong anti-immigration stance and made public comments, in the press and on the floor of Parliament, that would now be considered as anti-semitism. In the Melbourne Argus of 12 February 1947, he wrote:

The arrival of additional Jews is nothing less than the beginning of a national tragedy and a piece of the grossest deception of Parliament and the people by the Minister for Immigration.

Further, at a press conference in the same month, he said of Jews:

We should remember that they are European neither by race standards, nor culture. They are, in fact, an Eastern people. In 2000 years no one but Britain has been successfully able to absorb them, and for the most, they owe loyalty and allegiance to none.

Menzies has been criticised for his preference for older men of his own generation in his cabinet. Gullett is often mentioned as one of the younger men of ability who were too long denied promotion to cabinet or outer-cabinet positions.

He retired from the Parliament on 4 November 1955 and returned to journalism. In 1965 he was appointed Australian ambassador to Greece, and served there until 1968.

== After politics ==
Gullett had a long association with Canberra – he spent some of his youth there, and in married life, he took up the lease on Lambrigg station in 1949, the ACT rural property which had earlier been home to William Farrer during the time when he developed an important strain of rust-resistant wheat.

In the 1970s, he was a member of the Australian War Memorial Council, and served as its chairman between April and August 1974. He is featured in the Memorial's Fifty Australians exhibition.

Gullett was the author of two volumes of memoirs, Not As a Duty Only (1976), which covered his war service, and Good Company: Horseman, Soldier, Politician (1992), which is a more complete autobiography.

The couple left Lambrigg in 1987 and moved to the Canberra suburb of Griffith.

Ruth Mary Gullett died in Griffith on 6 April 1995, aged 73. Jo Gullett died on 24 August 1999, aged 84.

Parliament of Australia
| Preceded by Arthur Coles | Member for Henty; 1946–1955 | Succeeded by Max Fox |
Diplomatic posts
| Preceded by Alfred Stirling | Australian Ambassador to Greece; 1965 – 1968 | Succeeded by Hugh Gilchrist |
