= Arthur Coles =

Australian businessman and philanthropist

(Sir) Arthur Coles
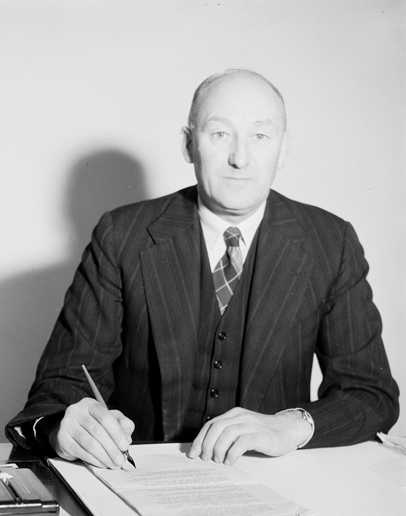
- Arthur Coles in 1945

Member of the Australian Parliament for Henty
- In office 21 September 1940 – 30 March 1946
- Preceded by: Sir Henry Gullett
- Succeeded by: Jo Gullett

65th Lord Mayor of Melbourne
- In office 1938–1940
- Preceded by: Sir Edward Campbell
- Succeeded by: Sir Francis Beaurepaire

Personal details
- Born: 6 August 1892 Geelong, Victoria, Australia
- Died: 23 June 1982 (aged 89) Melbourne, Victoria, Australia
- Party: Independent

Sir Arthur William "A.W." Coles (6 August 1892 – 23 June 1982) was a prominent Australian businessman and philanthropist, a son of St James, Victoria shopkeeper George W. Coles (died 1932).

With his brothers George James "G.J." (1885–1977), Kenneth Frank "K.F." (1896 –1985), Edgar Barton "E.B." (1899–1981), and Norman Cameron "N.C." Coles (1907–1989), A. W. Coles founded Coles Variety Stores in the 1920s, which was to become Coles Group, one of the two largest supermarket chains in Australia.

He served as Lord Mayor of Melbourne from 1938 to 1940.

In 1940 he was elected to the federal parliament as an Independent from Henty. With Alexander Wilson, he held the balance of power, at first keeping the UAP-National government in office, but in 1941 switching sides to install a new Australian Labor Party government.

In 1946 Coles was appointed chair of the Australian National Airways Commission, which founded Trans Australia Airlines (later known as Australian Airlines, which became the domestic arm of Qantas).

== Early life ==
Arthur Coles was born in Geelong, Victoria and educated at the elite private school The Geelong College. When World War I began, Coles enlisted as a private, fighting at Gallipoli and on the Western Front in France, and was wounded on three occasions before being commissioned as a lieutenant.

== Coles Variety Stores ==
Coles returned to Australia in 1919 and married Lillian Knight. He joined with two brothers and an uncle to open a variety store in Collingwood, a working-class suburb of Melbourne. Working on the slogan "Nothing over 2/6", the business grew rapidly. The family opened a series of new Coles Variety Stores around the country, Arthur moving to Sydney in 1928 to open and manage the first one in New South Wales. In 1931, at the height of the Great Depression, he returned to Melbourne to become managing director, a post he held until 1944. G. J. Coles & Co became the largest retailer in Australia.

== Lord Mayor and federal politics ==
Coles became Lord Mayor of Melbourne in 1938, remaining in that position until 1940. Thereupon he resigned to stand for the federal seat of Henty as an independent candidate. Coles was one of the two independent parliamentarians (the other was Alexander Wilson) who held the balance of power through the early years of the Second World War. He supported the United Australia Party (UAP) government of Robert Menzies and in 1941 began attending UAP partyroom meetings. He officially joined the UAP on 26 June 1941.

After Menzies was deposed, both Coles and Wilson crossed the floor in 1941 to remove the hapless UAP-Country Party government of Arthur Fadden. Governor-General Lord Gowrie was reluctant to call an election for a Parliament barely a year old, especially given the international situation. He summoned Coles and Wilson and made them promise that if he named Labor leader John Curtin prime minister, they would support him for the remainder of the Parliament to end the instability in government. The independents agreed, assuring Curtin's accession.

In 1944, Coles retired from business and devoted himself to public works, becoming the chair of both the Commonwealth Rationing Commission and the War Damage Commission. With the end of the war, he resigned from the legislature to become chair of British Commonwealth Pacific Airlines (BCPA) and the Australian National Airlines Commission (see Trans Australia Airlines). He was appointed chair of the Melbourne Olympic Games Committee in 1952, and a member of the CSIRO Advisory Council in 1956.

Knighted in 1960, Coles lived mostly in retirement from 1965. He died in 1982, leaving two living sons (three sons total, one predeceased him) and three daughters.

Political offices
Preceded by Edward Campbell	Lord Mayor of Melbourne; 1938–1940	Succeeded by Sir Frank Beaurepaire
Parliament of Australia
Preceded by Henry Gullett	Member for Henty; 1940–1946	Succeeded by Jo Gullett
