= Electoral results for the Division of Bass =

Australian division election results

This is a list of electoral results for the Division of Bass in Australian federal elections from the division's creation in 1903 until the present.

== Members ==
Member	Party	Term
David Storrer	Protectionist	1903–1909
David Storrer	Independent	1909–1910
Jens Jensen	Labor	1910–1916
Jens Jensen	National Labor	1916–1917
Jens Jensen	Nationalist	1917–1919
Jens Jensen	Independent	1919–1919
Syd Jackson	Nationalist	1919–1929
Allan Guy	Labor	1929–1931
Allan Guy	Independent	1931–1931
Allan Guy	United Australia	1931–1934
Claude Barnard	Labor	1934–1949
Bruce Kekwick	Liberal	1949–1954
Lance Barnard	Labor	1954–1975
Kevin Newman	Liberal	1975–1984
Warwick Smith	Liberal	1984–1993
Silvia Smith	Labor	1993–1996
Warwick Smith	Liberal	1996–1998
Michelle O'Byrne	Labor	1998–2004
Michael Ferguson	Liberal	2004–2007
Jodie Campbell	Labor	2007–2010
Geoff Lyons	Labor	2010–2013
Andrew Nikolic	Liberal	2013–2016
Ross Hart	Labor	2016–2019
Bridget Archer	Liberal	2019–2025
Jess Teesdale	Labor	2025–present

== Election results ==
=== Elections in the 2020s ===
==== 2025 ====
2025 Australian federal election: Bass
Party	Candidate	Votes	%	±%
Labor	Jess Teesdale	28,375	39.63	+11.02
Liberal	Bridget Archer	22,511	31.44	−8.29
Greens	Charlene McLennan	9,229	12.89	+1.79
One Nation	Jordan Potter	4,639	6.48	+1.77
Independent	George Razay	3,852	5.38	+0.35
Trumpet of Patriots	Ray Broomhall	2,287	3.19	+3.19
Citizens	Caroline Larner	701	0.98	+0.98
Total formal votes		71,594	95.94	+1.87
Informal votes		3,031	4.06	−1.87
Turnout		74,625	92.84	+0.89
Two-party-preferred result
Labor	Jess Teesdale	41,532	58.01	+9.44
Liberal	Bridget Archer	30,062	41.99	−9.44
Labor gain from Liberal		Swing	+9.44	

==== 2022 ====
2022 Australian federal election: Bass
Party	Candidate	Votes	%	±%
Liberal	Bridget Archer	27,257	39.73	−2.60
Labor	Ross Hart	19,630	28.61	−6.13
Greens	Cecily Rosol	7,614	11.10	+0.62
Lambie	Bob Salt	4,587	6.69	+6.69
Independent	George Razay	3,450	5.03	+5.03
One Nation	Melanie Davy	3,230	4.71	+4.71
United Australia	Kyle Squibb	1,140	1.66	−3.20
Animal Justice	Alison Baker	969	1.41	−1.02
Liberal Democrats	Stephen Humble	732	1.07	+1.07
Total formal votes		68,609	94.07	−1.43
Informal votes		4,324	5.93	+1.43
Turnout		72,933	91.95	−2.09
Two-party-preferred result
Liberal	Bridget Archer	35,288	51.43	+1.02
Labor	Ross Hart	33,321	48.57	−1.02
Liberal hold		Swing	+1.02	

Alluvial diagram for preference flows in the seat of Bass in the 2022 federal election. indicates at what stage the winning candidate had over 50% of the votes and was declared the winner.

=== Elections in the 2010s ===
==== 2019 ====
2019 Australian federal election: Bass
Party	Candidate	Votes	%	±%
Liberal	Bridget Archer	29,094	42.33	+3.14
Labor	Ross Hart	23,878	34.74	−4.91
Greens	Tom Hall	7,202	10.48	−0.57
United Australia	Allan Roark	3,342	4.86	+4.86
Independent	Todd Lambert	2,607	3.79	+3.79
Animal Justice	Susan Woodbury	1,667	2.43	+2.43
National	Carl Cooper	943	1.37	+1.37
Total formal votes		68,733	95.50	−0.53
Informal votes		3,240	4.50	+0.53
Turnout		71,973	94.04	+0.19
Two-party-preferred result
Liberal	Bridget Archer	34,648	50.41	+5.83
Labor	Ross Hart	34,085	49.59	−5.83
Liberal gain from Labor		Swing	+5.83	

==== 2016 ====
2016 Australian federal election: Bass
Party	Candidate	Votes	%	±%
Labor	Ross Hart	26,803	40.50	+5.85
Liberal	Andrew Nikolic	25,609	38.70	−9.15
Greens	Terrill Riley-Gibson	7,154	10.81	+2.91
Recreational Fishers	Mark Tapsell	3,231	4.88	+4.88
Christian Democrats	Malcolm Beattie	1,765	2.67	+2.67
Renewable Energy	Roy Ramage	1,613	2.44	+2.44
Total formal votes		66,175	96.04	+0.22
Informal votes		2,729	3.96	−0.22
Turnout		68,904	93.68	−0.74
Two-party-preferred result
Labor	Ross Hart	37,119	56.09	+10.13
Liberal	Andrew Nikolic	29,056	43.91	−10.13
Labor gain from Liberal		Swing	+10.13	

==== 2013 ====
2013 Australian federal election: Bass
Party	Candidate	Votes	%	±%
Liberal	Andrew Nikolic	31,267	47.85	+8.14
Labor	Geoff Lyons	22,643	34.65	−8.78
Greens	Lucy Landon-Lane	5,160	7.90	−7.68
Palmer United	Christopher Dobson	3,520	5.39	+5.39
Family First	Christine Bergman	1,407	2.15	+2.15
Christians	Ray Kroeze	963	1.47	+1.47
Secular	Jin-oh Choi	384	0.59	+0.59
Total formal votes		65,344	95.82	−0.20
Informal votes		2,850	4.18	+0.20
Turnout		68,194	94.46	−0.70
Two-party-preferred result
Liberal	Andrew Nikolic	35,310	54.04	+10.78
Labor	Geoff Lyons	30,034	45.96	−10.78
Liberal gain from Labor		Swing	+10.78	

==== 2010 ====
2010 Australian federal election: Bass
Party	Candidate	Votes	%	±%
Labor	Geoff Lyons	28,448	43.43	+6.17
Liberal	Steve Titmus	26,010	39.71	−3.71
Greens	Sancia Colgrave	10,206	15.58	+0.44
Citizens Electoral Council	Adrian Watts	838	1.28	+0.93
Total formal votes		65,502	96.02	−0.75
Informal votes		2,714	3.98	+0.75
Turnout		68,216	95.16	−1.14
Two-party-preferred result
Labor	Geoff Lyons	37,165	56.74	+5.71
Liberal	Steve Titmus	28,337	43.26	−5.71
Labor hold		Swing	+5.71	

=== Elections in the 2000s ===
==== 2007 ====
2007 Australian federal election: Bass
Party	Candidate	Votes	%	±%
Liberal	Michael Ferguson	27,769	43.50	−5.63
Labor	Jodie Campbell	23,764	37.23	−1.99
Greens	Tom Millen	9,745	15.27	+7.17
Independent	Sven Wiener	1,123	1.76	+1.76
Family First	Ixa de Haan	930	1.46	−0.37
Liberty & Democracy	Shem Bennett	285	0.45	+0.45
Citizens Electoral Council	Adrian Watts	219	0.34	−1.02
Total formal votes		63,835	96.75	+0.65
Informal votes		2,142	3.25	−0.65
Turnout		65.977	95.66	+0.03
Two-party-preferred result
Labor	Jodie Campbell	32,553	51.00	+3.63
Liberal	Michael Ferguson	31,282	49.00	−3.63
Labor gain from Liberal		Swing	+3.63	

==== 2004 ====
2004 Australian federal election: Bass
Party	Candidate	Votes	%	±%
Liberal	Michael Ferguson	30,678	49.13	+7.68
Labor	Michelle O'Byrne	24,491	39.22	−3.60
Greens	Jeremy Ball	5,059	8.10	+1.86
Family First	Christine Bergman	1,145	1.83	+1.83
Citizens Electoral Council	Caroline Larner	847	1.36	+1.10
Socialist Alliance	Meredith de Landelles	219	0.35	+0.35
Total formal votes		62,439	96.10	+0.37
Informal votes		2,534	3.90	−0.37
Turnout		64,973	95.63	−0.53
Two-party-preferred result
Liberal	Michael Ferguson	32,860	52.63	+4.69
Labor	Michelle O'Byrne	29,579	47.37	−4.69
Liberal gain from Labor		Swing	+4.69	

==== 2001 ====
2001 Australian federal election: Bass
Party	Candidate	Votes	%	±%
Labor	Michelle O'Byrne	25,987	42.82	+0.53
Liberal	Tony Benneworth	25,156	41.45	−4.29
Greens	Kim Booth	3,788	6.24	+1.99
Democrats	Sancia Colgrave	2,178	3.59	+1.15
One Nation	Denis Collins	1,836	3.03	−0.35
Liberals for Forests	Margy Dockray	966	1.59	+1.59
Tasmania First	Ian Hardman	621	1.02	−0.89
Citizens Electoral Council	Caroline Larner	159	0.26	+0.26
Total formal votes		60,691	95.73	−0.88
Informal votes		2,706	4.27	+0.88
Turnout		63,397	97.31	
Two-party-preferred result
Labor	Michelle O'Byrne	31,598	52.06	+1.87
Liberal	Tony Benneworth	29,093	47.94	−1.87
Labor hold		Swing	+1.87	

=== Elections in the 1990s ===
==== 1998 ====
1998 Australian federal election: Bass
Party	Candidate	Votes	%	±%
Liberal	Warwick Smith	27,974	45.75	−5.48
Labor	Michelle O'Byrne	25,864	42.30	+2.06
Greens	Stuart Baird	2,595	4.24	−0.73
One Nation	Allan Lockhart	2,057	3.36	+3.36
Democrats	Brian Muir	1,491	2.44	−1.12
Tasmania First	Harvey Smith	1,165	1.91	+1.91
Total formal votes		61,146	96.61	−1.30
Informal votes		2,148	3.39	+1.30
Turnout		63,294	96.00	−0.26
Two-party-preferred result
Labor	Michelle O'Byrne	30,612	50.06	+4.63
Liberal	Warwick Smith	30,534	49.94	−4.63
Labor gain from Liberal		Swing	+4.63	

==== 1996 ====
1996 Australian federal election: Bass
Party	Candidate	Votes	%	±%
Liberal	Warwick Smith	31,875	51.23	+3.91
Labor	Silvia Smith	25,034	40.24	−3.56
Greens	Kristina Nicklason	3,093	4.97	−1.36
Democrats	Debbie Butler	2,214	3.56	+1.01
Total formal votes		62,216	97.31	+0.75
Informal votes		1,328	2.09	−0.75
Turnout		63,544	96.25	+0.24
Two-party-preferred result
Liberal	Warwick Smith	33,861	54.57	+4.60
Labor	Silvia Smith	28,190	45.43	−4.60
Liberal gain from Labor		Swing	+4.60	

==== 1993 ====
1993 Australian federal election: Bass
Party	Candidate	Votes	%	±%
Liberal	Warwick Smith	29,187	47.32	−2.79
Labor	Silvia Smith	27,014	43.80	+6.11
Greens	David Hunnerup	3,907	6.33	+2.09
Democrats	Brian Austen	1,572	2.55	−5.41
Total formal votes		61,680	97.16	+0.41
Informal votes		1,805	2.84	−0.41
Turnout		63,485	96.02	
Two-party-preferred result
Labor	Silvia Smith	30,850	50.03	+4.54
Liberal	Warwick Smith	30,810	49.97	−4.54
Labor gain from Liberal		Swing	+4.54	

==== 1990 ====
1990 Australian federal election: Bass
Party	Candidate	Votes	%	±%
Liberal	Warwick Smith	28,441	49.9	−1.9
Labor	Silvia Smith	21,619	37.9	−5.0
Democrats	Rae Saxon	4,449	7.8	+2.4
United Tasmania	John Chester	2,479	4.4	+4.4
Total formal votes		56,988	96.7	
Informal votes		1,928	3.3	
Turnout		58,916	96.4	
Two-party-preferred result
Liberal	Warwick Smith	30,896	54.3	+0.6
Labor	Silvia Smith	26,005	45.7	−0.6
Liberal hold		Swing	+0.6	

=== Elections in the 1980s ===
==== 1987 ====
1987 Australian federal election: Bass
Party	Candidate	Votes	%	±%
Liberal	Warwick Smith	28,149	51.8	−0.2
Labor	Richard Taylor	23,311	42.9	−0.1
Democrats	Michael Preece	2,910	5.4	+0.4
Total formal votes		54,370	94.3	
Informal votes		3,281	5.7	
Turnout		57,651	96.0	
Two-party-preferred result
Liberal	Warwick Smith	29,173	53.7	−0.7
Labor	Richard Taylor	25,194	46.3	+0.7
Liberal hold		Swing	−0.7	

==== 1984 ====
1984 Australian federal election: Bass
Party	Candidate	Votes	%	±%
Liberal	Warwick Smith	27,226	52.0	−1.3
Labor	Vicki Buchanan	22,544	43.0	+6.0
Democrats	Michael Preece	2,624	5.0	−1.2
Total formal votes		52,394	93.3	
Informal votes		3,745	6.7	
Turnout		56,139	95.7	
Two-party-preferred result
Liberal	Warwick Smith	28,514	54.4	−3.7
Labor	Vicki Buchanan	23,878	45.6	+3.7
Liberal hold		Swing	−3.7	

==== 1983 ====
1983 Australian federal election: Bass
Party	Candidate	Votes	%	±%
Liberal	Kevin Newman	28,448	53.5	+0.5
Labor	John McDonald	19,590	36.8	−7.7
Democrats	Nick Goldie	3,291	6.2	+6.2
Independent	Richard Hutchison	1,884	3.5	+3.5
Total formal votes		53,213	97.4	
Informal votes		1,409	2.6	
Turnout		54,622	95.9	
Two-party-preferred result
Liberal	Kevin Newman		58.3	+4.4
Labor	John McDonald		41.7	−4.4
Liberal hold		Swing	+4.4	

==== 1980 ====
1980 Australian federal election: Bass
Party	Candidate	Votes	%	±%
Liberal	Kevin Newman	27,586	53.0	−2.7
Labor	Patti Warn	23,199	44.5	+7.8
Independent	Olga Scully	1,310	2.5	+2.5
Total formal votes		52,095	97.5	
Informal votes		1,320	2.5	
Turnout		53,415	96.7	
Two-party-preferred result
Liberal	Kevin Newman		54.3	−5.7
Labor	Patti Warn		45.7	+5.7
Liberal hold		Swing	−5.7	

=== Elections in the 1970s ===
==== 1977 ====
1977 Australian federal election: Bass
Party	Candidate	Votes	%	±%
Liberal	Kevin Newman	28,022	55.7	−7.4
Labor	Mary Willey	18,447	36.7	+2.1
Democrats	Dennis Cartledge	3,795	7.6	+7.6
Total formal votes		50,264	97.3	
Informal votes		1,412	2.7	
Turnout		51,676	96.3	
Two-party-preferred result
Liberal	Kevin Newman		60.0	−4.1
Labor	Mary Willey		40.0	+4.1
Liberal hold		Swing	−4.1	

==== 1975 ====
1975 Australian federal election: Bass
Party	Candidate	Votes	%	±%
Liberal	Kevin Newman	28,382	63.1	+17.1
Labor	Michael McLaughlin	15,574	34.6	−19.4
Workers	Kevin Chaffey	1,001	2.2	+2.2
Total formal votes		44,957	98.1	
Informal votes		878	1.9	
Turnout		45,835	96.7	
Two-party-preferred result
Liberal	Kevin Newman		64.1	+18.1
Labor	Michael McLaughlin		35.9	−18.1
Liberal hold		Swing	+18.1	

==== 1975 by-election ====
1975 Bass by-election
Party	Candidate	Votes	%	±%
Liberal	Kevin Newman	24,638	57.6	+11.6
Labor	John Macrostie	15,609	36.5	−17.5
United Tasmania	Violet Petrovsky	1,272	3.0	+3.0
Independent	Paul Kent	904	2.1	+2.1
Independent	Marcus Aussie-Stone	243	0.6	+0.6
Independent	Syd Negus	124	0.3	+0.3
Total formal votes		43,814	98.2	+0.2
Informal votes		773	1.8	−0.2
Turnout		43,563	93.2	−2.0
Two-party-preferred result
Liberal	Kevin Newman		60.3	+14.3
Labor	John Macrostie		39.7	−14.3
Liberal gain from Labor		Swing	+14.3	

==== 1974 ====
1974 Australian federal election: Bass
Party	Candidate	Votes	%	±%
Labor	Lance Barnard	23,677	54.0	−4.8
Liberal	John Beswick	20,137	46.0	+9.2
Total formal votes		43,814	98.0	
Informal votes		877	2.0	
Turnout		44,691	95.2	
Labor hold		Swing	−5.7	

==== 1972 ====
1972 Australian federal election: Bass
Party	Candidate	Votes	%	±%
Labor	Lance Barnard	23,439	58.8	+6.6
Liberal	John Beswick	14,661	36.8	−4.4
Democratic Labor	Jindrich Nermut	1,783	4.5	+4.5
Total formal votes		39,883	98.4	
Informal votes		636	1.6	
Turnout		40,519	96.9	
Two-party-preferred result
Labor	Lance Barnard		59.7	+4.7
Liberal	John Beswick		40.3	−4.7
Labor hold		Swing	+4.7	

=== Elections in the 1960s ===
==== 1969 ====
1969 Australian federal election: Bass
Party	Candidate	Votes	%	±%
Labor	Lance Barnard	20,214	52.2	−4.3
Liberal	Neil Pitt	15,955	41.2	+3.6
Democratic Labor	Peter Ferrall	1,094	2.8	−3.1
Australia	John Kent	1,069	2.8	+2.8
Independent	Geoffrey Batten	398	1.0	+1.0
Total formal votes		38,730	98.1	
Informal votes		742	1.9	
Turnout		39,472	96.4	
Two-party-preferred result
Labor	Lance Barnard		55.0	−2.7
Liberal	Neil Pitt		45.0	+2.7
Labor hold		Swing	−2.7	

==== 1966 ====
1966 Australian federal election: Bass
Party	Candidate	Votes	%	±%
Labor	Lance Barnard	21,262	57.2	−1.1
Liberal	Timothy Barrenger	13,739	36.9	+0.9
Democratic Labor	Richard Delany	2,183	5.9	+0.2
Total formal votes		37,184	98.6	
Informal votes		538	1.4	
Turnout		37,722	95.3	
Two-party-preferred result
Labor	Lance Barnard		58.4	−1.0
Liberal	Timothy Barrenger		41.6	+1.0
Labor hold		Swing	−1.0	

==== 1963 ====
1963 Australian federal election: Bass
Party	Candidate	Votes	%	±%
Labor	Lance Barnard	21,182	58.3	−4.4
Liberal	James Wardlaw	13,078	36.0	+3.1
Democratic Labor	Frederick Kaye	2,055	5.7	+1.3
Total formal votes		36,315	98.9	
Informal votes		410	1.1	
Turnout		36,725	96.3	
Two-party-preferred result
Labor	Lance Barnard		59.4	−4.2
Liberal	James Wardlaw		40.6	+4.2
Labor hold		Swing	−4.2	

==== 1961 ====
1961 Australian federal election: Bass
Party	Candidate	Votes	%	±%
Labor	Lance Barnard	21,601	62.7	+7.1
Liberal	Fred Marriott	11,326	32.9	−3.8
Democratic Labor	Francis Boland	1,532	4.4	−3.3
Total formal votes		34,459	96.9	
Informal votes		1,116	3.1	
Turnout		35,575	95.6	
Two-party-preferred result
Labor	Lance Barnard		63.6	+5.7
Liberal	Fred Marriott		36.4	−5.7
Labor hold		Swing	+5.7	

=== Elections in the 1950s ===
==== 1958 ====
1958 Australian federal election: Bass
Party	Candidate	Votes	%	±%
Labor	Lance Barnard	18,800	55.6	+0.1
Liberal	Max Bushby	12,394	36.7	+0.1
Democratic Labor	Leslie Arnold	2,610	7.7	−0.2
Total formal votes		33,804	96.4	
Informal votes		1,258	3.6	
Turnout		35,062	97.1	
Two-party-preferred result
Labor	Lance Barnard		57.9	+0.8
Liberal	Max Bushby		42.1	−0.8
Labor hold		Swing	+0.8	

==== 1955 ====
1955 Australian federal election: Bass
Party	Candidate	Votes	%	±%
Labor	Lance Barnard	18,197	55.5	+4.5
Liberal	Frederick White	12,009	36.6	−12.4
Labor (A-C)	Leslie Duke	2,589	7.9	+7.9
Total formal votes		32,795	96.2	
Informal votes		1,291	3.8	
Turnout		34,086	96.5	
Two-party-preferred result
Labor	Lance Barnard		57.1	+6.1
Liberal	Frederick White		42.9	−6.1
Labor hold		Swing	+6.1	

==== 1954 ====
1954 Australian federal election: Bass
Party	Candidate	Votes	%	±%
Labor	Lance Barnard	16,623	51.0	+4.4
Liberal	Bruce Kekwick	15,946	49.0	−4.4
Total formal votes		32,569	99.1	
Informal votes		289	0.9	
Turnout		32,858	96.7	
Labor gain from Liberal		Swing	+4.4	

==== 1951 ====
1951 Australian federal election: Bass
Party	Candidate	Votes	%	±%
Liberal	Bruce Kekwick	16,469	53.4	+2.8
Labor	Colman O'Byrne	14,346	46.6	−2.8
Total formal votes		30,815	96.4	
Informal votes		1,137	3.6	
Turnout		31,952	96.8	
Liberal hold		Swing	+2.8	

=== Elections in the 1940s ===
==== 1949 ====
1949 Australian federal election: Bass
Party	Candidate	Votes	%	±%
Liberal	Bruce Kekwick	15,686	50.6	+6.8
Labor	Claude Barnard	15,312	49.4	−6.8
Total formal votes		30,998	97.3	
Informal votes		865	2.7	
Turnout		31,863	96.9	
Liberal gain from Labor		Swing	+6.8	

==== 1946 ====
1946 Australian federal election: Bass
Party	Candidate	Votes	%	±%
Labor	Claude Barnard	13,495	50.0	−1.2
Liberal	Harry Spotswood	8,219	30.4	+12.8
Independent	John Orchard	5,281	19.6	+2.0
Total formal votes		26,995	98.0	
Informal votes		557	2.0	
Turnout		27,552	93.9	
Two-party-preferred result
Labor	Claude Barnard	15,387	57.0	−0.3
Liberal	Harry Spotswood	11,608	43.0	+0.3
Labor hold		Swing	−0.3	

==== 1943 ====
1943 Australian federal election: Bass
Party	Candidate	Votes	%	±%
Labor	Claude Barnard	13,136	51.2	+1.8
United Australia	Desmond Oldham	7,085	27.6	−17.1
Independent	John Orchard	4,509	17.6	+17.6
Independent	John Watson	469	1.8	−4.2
Independent	Harold Harwood	440	1.7	+1.7
Total formal votes		25,639	96.1	
Informal votes		1,039	3.9	
Turnout		26,678	98.4	
Two-party-preferred result
Labor	Claude Barnard		57.3	+3.1
United Australia	Desmond Oldham		42.7	−3.1
Labor hold		Swing	+3.1	

The Australian Labor Party endorsed two candidates for Bass at the election: the incumbent MP Claude Barnard and Thomas Adkins. Due to a misunderstanding, Adkins failed to lodge his nomination before the deadline and did not appear on the ballot paper.

==== 1940 ====
1940 Australian federal election: Bass
Party	Candidate	Votes	%	±%
Labor	Claude Barnard	12,009	49.4	−1.0
United Australia	Algie Findlay	5,634	23.2	+5.6
United Australia	Desmond Oldham	5,215	21.5	+21.5
Independent	John Watson	1,452	6.0	−4.5
Total formal votes		24,310	96.8	
Informal votes		813	3.2	
Turnout		25,123	95.4	
Two-party-preferred result
Labor	Claude Barnard		54.2	−1.5
United Australia	Algie Findlay		45.8	+1.5
Labor hold		Swing	−1.5	

=== Elections in the 1930s ===
==== 1937 ====
1937 Australian federal election: Bass
Party	Candidate	Votes	%	±%
Labor	Claude Barnard	12,583	50.4	+22.8
United Australia	Allan Guy	9,760	39.1	−2.4
Independent	John Watson	2,621	10.5	−0.5
Total formal votes		24,964	97.6	
Informal votes		612	2.4	
Turnout		25,576	96.5	
Two-party-preferred result
Labor	Claude Barnard		55.7	+5.4
United Australia	Allan Guy		44.3	−5.4
Labor hold		Swing	+5.4	

==== 1934 ====
1934 Australian federal election: Bass
Party	Candidate	Votes	%	±%
United Australia	Allan Guy	9,880	41.5	−5.1
Labor	Claude Barnard	6,572	27.6	−3.0
Independent	George McElwee	4,740	19.9	+19.9
Independent	John Watson	2,610	11.0	+11.0
Total formal votes		23,802	96.4	
Informal votes		887	3.6	
Turnout		24,689	96.2	
Two-party-preferred result
Labor	Claude Barnard	11,984	50.3	+14.8
United Australia	Allan Guy	11,818	49.7	−14.8
Labor gain from United Australia		Swing	+14.8	

==== 1931 ====
1931 Australian federal election: Bass
Party	Candidate	Votes	%	±%
United Australia	Allan Guy	10,293	46.6	+7.0
Labor	Claude Barnard	6,763	30.6	−29.8
Nationalist	Harold Solomon	5,032	22.8	+22.8
Total formal votes		32,088	94.9	
Informal votes		1,197	5.1	
Turnout		23,285	96.5	
Two-party-preferred result
United Australia	Allan Guy	14,247	64.5	+24.9
Labor	Claude Barnard	7,841	35.5	−24.9
United Australia gain from Labor		Swing	+24.9	

=== Elections in the 1920s ===
==== 1929 ====
1929 Australian federal election: Bass
Party	Candidate	Votes	%	±%
Labor	Allan Guy	13,318	60.4	+17.8
Nationalist	Syd Jackson	8,741	39.6	−17.8
Total formal votes		22,059	98.6	
Informal votes		324	1.4	
Turnout		22,383	95.4	
Labor gain from Nationalist		Swing	+13.5	

==== 1928 ====
1928 Australian federal election: Bass
Party	Candidate	Votes	%	±%
Labor	Thomas Wilson	8,621	42.6	−0.4
Nationalist	Syd Jackson	5,991	29.6	+0.3
Nationalist	William Judd	5,606	27.7	+27.7
Total formal votes		20,218	95.0	
Informal votes		1,067	5.0	
Turnout		21,285	92.5	
Two-party-preferred result
Nationalist	Syd Jackson	10,736	53.1	−5.2
Labor	Thomas Wilson	9,482	46.9	+5.2
Nationalist hold		Swing	−5.2	

==== 1925 ====
1925 Australian federal election: Bass
Party	Candidate	Votes	%	±%
Nationalist	Syd Jackson	10,929	57.0	+6.8
Labor	Harold Holmes	5,654	29.5	+8.0
Labor	John Swain	2,582	13.5	+13.5
Total formal votes		19,165	94.1	
Informal votes		1,192	5.9	
Turnout		29,357	88.5	
Two-party-preferred result
Nationalist	Syd Jackson		58.3	+4.7
Labor	Harold Holmes		41.7	−4.7
Nationalist hold		Swing	+4.7	

==== 1922 ====
1922 Australian federal election: Bass
Party	Candidate	Votes	%	±%
Nationalist	Syd Jackson	4,819	50.2	+2.0
Labor	Alfred Higgins	3,359	35.0	+1.3
Independent Labor	King O'Malley	1,085	11.3	+11.3
Ind. Nationalist	John Hegarty	337	3.5	+3.5
Total formal votes		9,600	95.3	
Informal votes		478	4.7	
Turnout		10,078	44.9	
Two-party-preferred result
Nationalist	Syd Jackson		53.6	−3.7
Labor	Alfred Higgins		46.4	+3.7
Nationalist hold		Swing	−3.7	

=== Elections in the 1910s ===
==== 1919 ====
1919 Australian federal election: Bass
Party	Candidate	Votes	%	±%
Labor	Alfred Higgins	4,292	35.3	−4.8
Nationalist	Syd Jackson	3,127	25.7	−13.2
Nationalist	Stephen Margetts	2,553	21.0	+21.0
Ind. Nationalist	Jens Jensen	1,689	13.9	+13.9
Independent	Timothy Earley	328	2.7	+2.7
Independent	Luke Bryant	167	1.4	+1.4
Total formal votes		12,156	91.3	
Informal votes		1,155	8.7	
Turnout		13,311	53.7	
Two-party-preferred result
Nationalist	Syd Jackson	6,779	55.8	−4.1
Labor	Alfred Higgins	5,377	44.2	+4.1
Nationalist hold		Swing	−4.1	

==== 1917 ====
1917 Australian federal election: Bass
Party	Candidate	Votes	%	±%
Nationalist	Jens Jensen	9,669	59.9	+15.9
Labor	James Mooney	6,466	40.1	−15.9
Total formal votes		16,135	97.1	
Informal votes		478	2.9	
Turnout		16,613	72.2	
Nationalist gain from Labor		Swing	+15.9	

==== 1914 ====
1914 Australian federal election: Bass
Party	Candidate	Votes	%	±%
Labor	Jens Jensen	9,731	56.0	+3.6
Liberal	Alexander Marshall	7,638	44.0	−3.6
Total formal votes		17,369	98.5	
Informal votes		270	1.5	
Turnout		17,639	79.0	
Labor hold		Swing	+3.6	

==== 1913 ====
1913 Australian federal election: Bass
Party	Candidate	Votes	%	±%
Labor	Jens Jensen	7,945	52.4	−4.4
Liberal	Stephen Margetts	7,212	47.6	+47.6
Total formal votes		15,166	97.1	
Informal votes		457	2.9	
Turnout		15,623	73.4	
Labor hold		Swing	−4.4	

==== 1910 ====
1910 Australian federal election: Bass
Party	Candidate	Votes	%	±%
Labour	Jens Jensen	6,612	56.8	+56.8
Ind. Protectionist	David Storrer	5,022	43.2	−3.6
Total formal votes		11,643	97.9	
Informal votes		248	2.1	
Turnout		11,882	56.8	
Labour gain from Liberal		Swing	+56.8	

=== Elections in the 1900s ===
==== 1906 ====
1906 Australian federal election: Bass
Party	Candidate	Votes	%	±%
Protectionist	David Storrer	5,826	62.3	+5.6
Free Trade	William Oldham	3,522	37.7	−5.6
Total formal votes		9,348	96.1	
Informal votes		380	3.9	
Turnout		9,728	52.2	
Protectionist hold		Swing	+5.6	

==== 1903 ====
1903 Australian federal election: Bass
Party	Candidate	Votes	%	±%
Protectionist	David Storrer	4,092	56.7	+56.7
Free Trade	William Hartnoll	3,124	43.3	+43.3
Total formal votes		7,216	97.6	
Informal votes		181	2.4	
Turnout		7,398	42.1	
Protectionist win		(new seat)		
