= 1967 Australian Labor Party leadership election =

1967 Australian Labor Party Leadership election
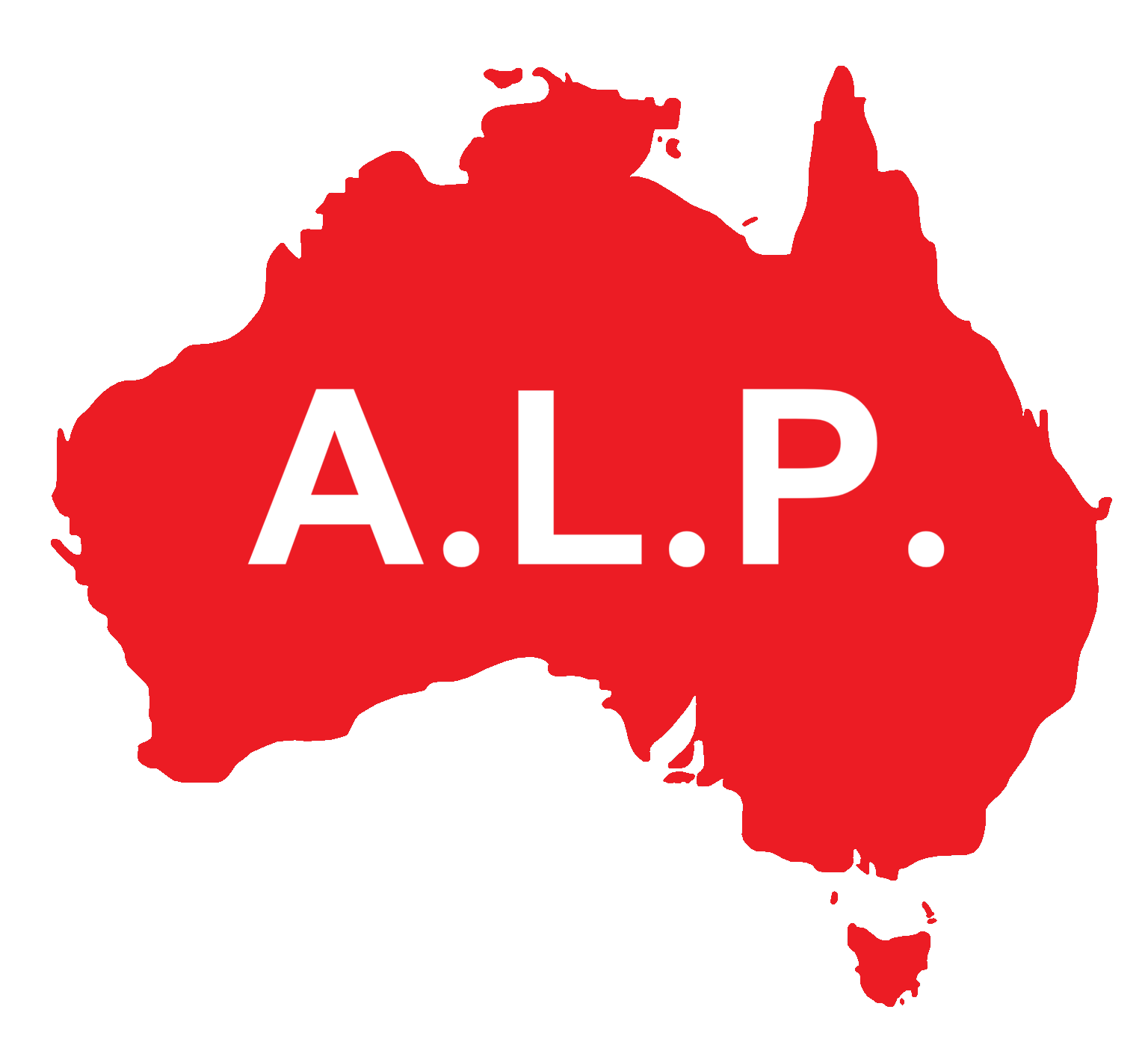
- 8 February 1967
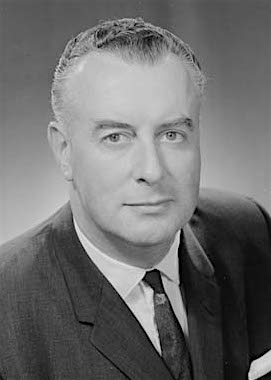

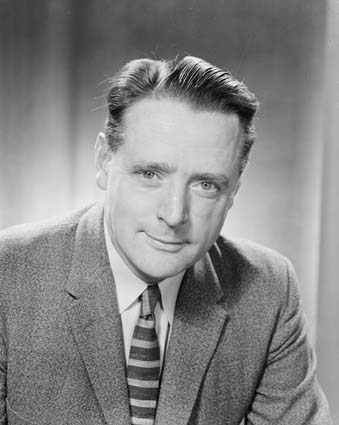

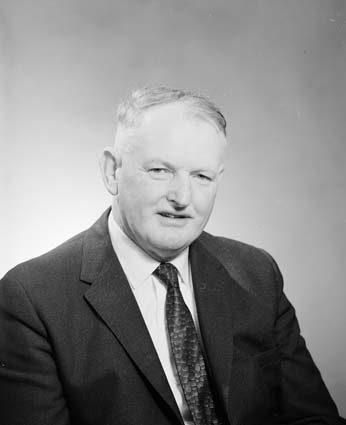

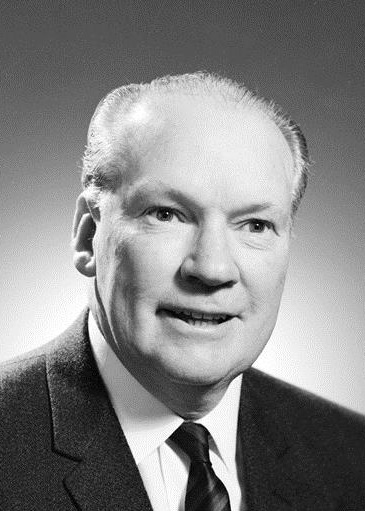

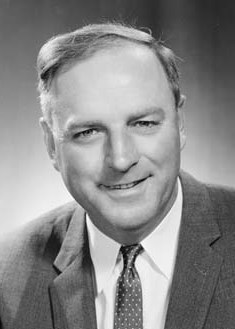
Candidate	Gough Whitlam	Jim Cairns	Frank Crean
First ballot	32 (47.1%)	15 (22.1%)	12 (17.6%)
Second ballot	33 (48.5%)	15 (22.1%)	12 (17.6%)
Third ballot	39 (57.4%)	15 (22.1%)	14 (20.6%)
Candidate	Fred Daly	Kim Beazley
First ballot	6 (8.8%)	3 (4.4%)
Second ballot	8 (11.8%)	Eliminated
Third ballot	Eliminated	Eliminated
Leader before election
Arthur Calwell
Elected Leader
Gough Whitlam

A leadership election in the Australian Labor Party, then the opposition party in the Parliament of Australia, was held on 8 February 1967. It followed the resignation of previous leader Arthur Calwell. The contest was won by Calwell's deputy Gough Whitlam in a caucus ballot.

== Results ==
Australian Labor Party Deputy Leadership election, 1967
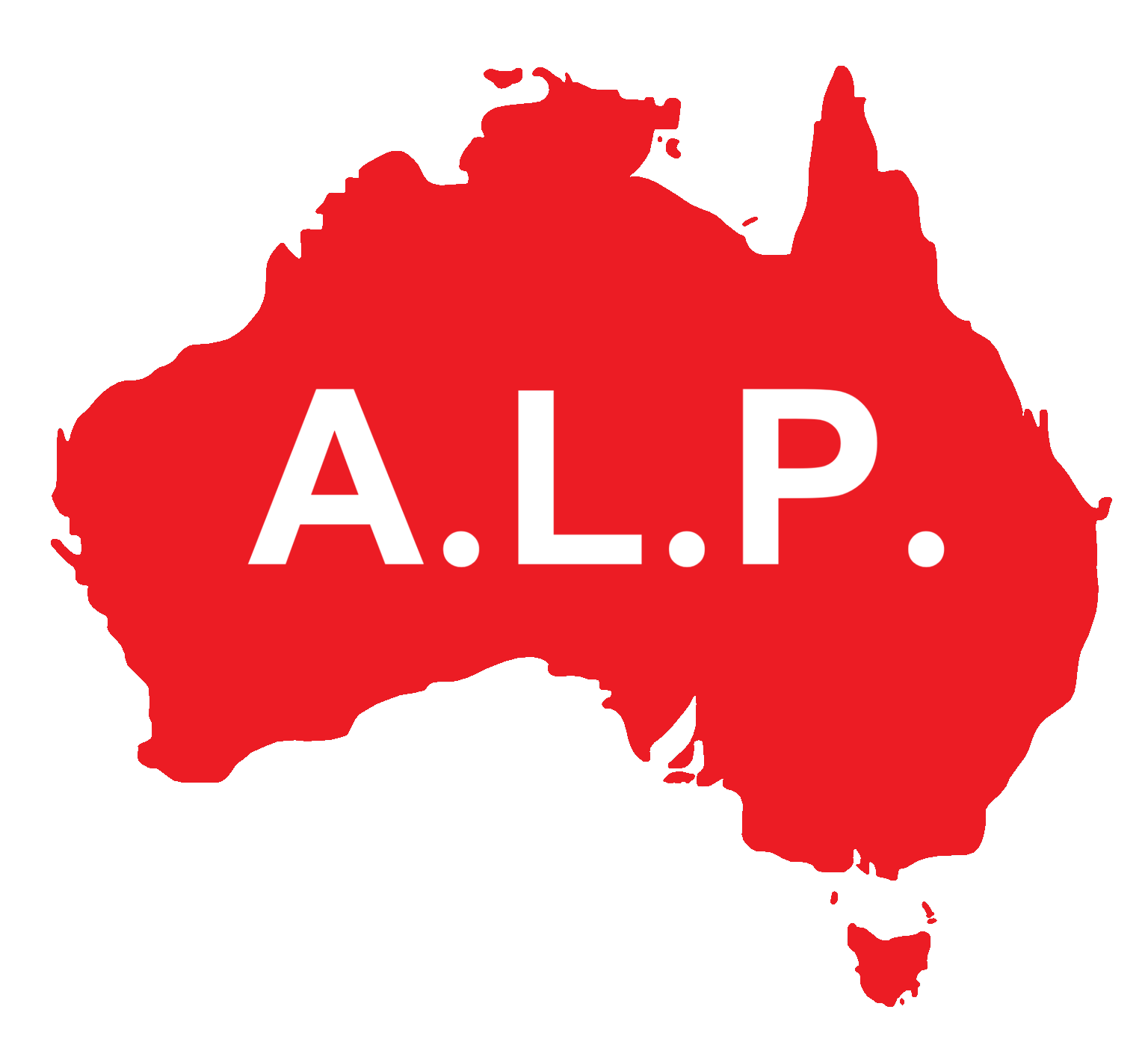

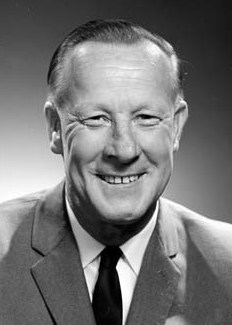

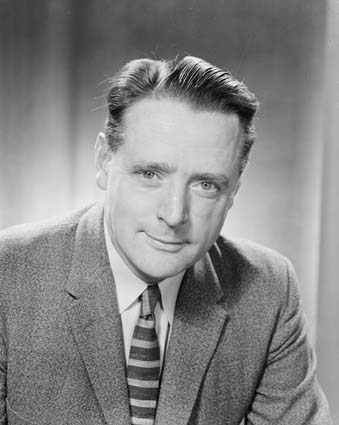
Candidate	Lance Barnard	Jim Cairns
Seventh ballot	35 (51.5%)	33 (48.5%)
Deputy Leader before election
Gough Whitlam
Deputy Leader after election
Lance Barnard

=== Leader ===
The following table gives the ballot results:

Candidate	1st ballot	2nd ballot	3rd ballot
Gough Whitlam	32	33	39
Jim Cairns	15	15	15
Frank Crean	12	12	14
Fred Daly	6	8	Eliminated
Kim Beazley	3	Eliminated	

=== Deputy leader ===
The following table gives the ballot results:

Candidate	1st ballot	2nd ballot	3rd ballot	4th ballot	5th ballot	6th ballot	7th ballot
Lance Barnard	14	15	15	17	18	24	35
Jim Cairns	18	21	21	22	23	30	33
Frank Stewart	7	7	8	10	14	14	Eliminated
Frank Crean	8	9	11	11	13	Eliminated	
Fred Daly	6	6	7	8	Eliminated		
Kim Beazley	5	5	6	Eliminated			
Gordon Bryant	5	Eliminated					
Abstentions	5	5	0	0	0	0	0
