= Syd Jackson (politician) =

Australian politician

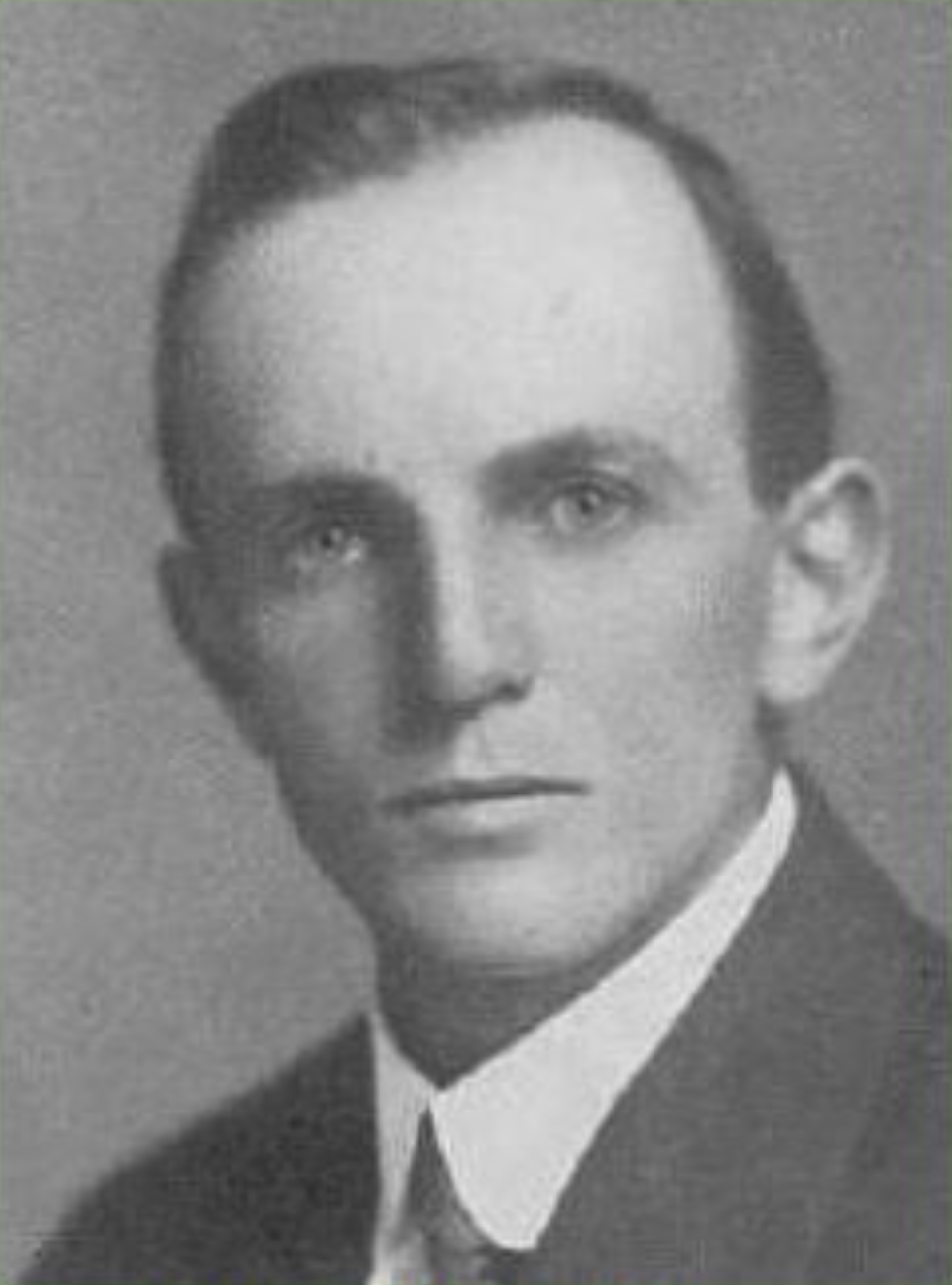

Member of the Australian Parliament for Bass
- In office 13 December 1919 – 12 October 1929
- Preceded by: Jens Jensen
- Succeeded by: Allan Guy

Personal details
- Born: David Sydney Jackson; 6 June 1889 Launceston, Tasmania
- Died: 28 February 1941 (aged 51) Launceston, Tasmania, Australia
- Party: Nationalist Party of Australia
- Occupation: Locksmith

David Sydney "Syd" Jackson (6 June 1889 – 28 February 1941) was an Australian politician. He was a Nationalist Party member of the Australian House of Representatives from 1919 to 1929, representing the electorate of Bass.

Jackson was born in Launceston, Tasmania, and educated at Charles Street and Wellington Square state schools. He went into his father's manufacturing locksmith business, Launceston-based Jackson Lock and Brass Works Pty Ltd, at 13, and was taken into partnership at 21. He became secretary of the men's division of the Liberal League c. 1910, and was an elected warden of the Launceston Marine Board from 1916 to 1921. He was active in local sporting circles, and won the Tasmanian singles championship in lawn bowls in 1911.

In 1919, he was elected to the Australian House of Representatives as the Nationalist member for Bass, defeating Nationalist-turned-independent MP Jens Jensen. He was a member of the Standing Committee on Public Works for seven years, and was the only member of the House appointed to travel Central Australia in 1921 for the North-South Railway Enquiry. He held the seat until his defeat in 1929 by Labor candidate Allan Guy.

He made an unsuccessful attempt to enter state politics after his federal defeat. After leaving politics, Jackson was president of the Tasmanian Chamber of Manufactures and the Tasmanian Bush Nursing Association. He also served as president of the Launceston branch of the Australian Natives' Association and in 1937 as chairman of the Tasmanian Exhibition.

Jackson died in 1941 at York Street, Launceston.

Parliament of Australia
Preceded by Jens Jensen	Member for Bass; 1919–1929	Succeeded by Allan Guy
