= Geoff Lyons =

Australian politician (born 1953)

Geoff Lyons OAM

Member of the Australian Parliament for Bass
- In office 21 August 2010 – 7 September 2013
- Preceded by: Jodie Campbell
- Succeeded by: Andrew Nikolic

Personal details
- Born: 29 April 1953 (age 72) Sydney, New South Wales, Australia
- Party: Australian Labor Party

Geoffrey Raymond Lyons OAM (born 29 April 1953), an Australian former politician, was a member of the Australian House of Representatives for the seat of Bass in Tasmania, representing the Australian Labor Party. He succeeded Labor MP Jodie Campbell, who retired from politics, at the 2010 federal election.

== Background ==
Lyons previously worked in public health. He was later head of office for Peter Patmore, the state Attorney-General, before contesting the state seat of Bass unsuccessfully at the 2002 state election. Prior to his election he had worked for both his predecessor Jodie Campbell and Senator Helen Polley.

Lyons is married with three children.

Parliament of Australia
Preceded by Jodie Campbell	Member for Bass; 2010–2013	Succeeded by Andrew Nikolic
