= Andrew Nikolic =

Australian Army brigadier and politician (born 1961)

Andrew Nikolic AM, CSC
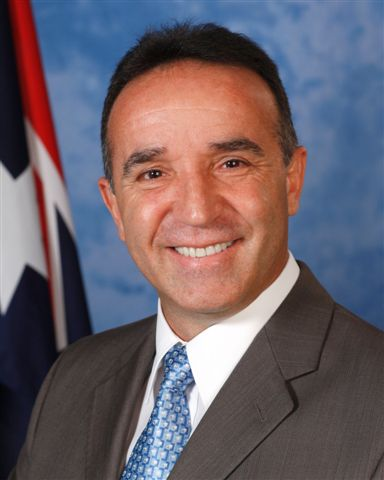
- Official portrait, 2009

Government Whip in the House of Representatives
- In office 13 February 2015 – 20 September 2015
- Prime Minister: Tony Abbott; Malcolm Turnbull
- Preceded by: Scott Buchholz
- Succeeded by: Brett Whiteley

Member of the Australian Parliament for Bass
- In office 7 September 2013 – 2 July 2016
- Preceded by: Geoff Lyons
- Succeeded by: Ross Hart

Personal details
- Born: Andrija Nikolić; 20 June 1961 (age 65) Prokuplje, PR Serbia, FPR Yugoslavia
- Spouse: Christine Nikolic
- Children: 3
- Education: Officer Cadet School, Portsea; University of Adelaide; Southern Cross University; University of New South Wales; Deakin University; United States Army War College

Military service
- Allegiance: Australia
- Branch/service: Australian Army
- Years of service: 1979–2008
- Rank: Brigadier
- Commands: Australian National Commander, Southern Iraq; Parachute Training School; Army Recruit Training Centre
- Battles/wars: War in Afghanistan; Iraq War
- Awards: Member of the Order of Australia; Conspicuous Service Cross

Andrew Alexander Nikolic AM, CSC (born 20 June 1961) is a former Australian politician, retired senior Australian Army officer, and a former public servant in the Department of Defence. He was elected to the Australian House of Representatives as the Liberal Party representative for the Tasmanian seat of Bass at the 2013 federal election, but after one term, he lost his seat at the 2016 federal election.

== Early years ==
Andrija Nikolić (Serbian Cyrillic: Андрија Николић) was born in Serbia, at the time part of Yugoslavia, on 20 June 1961, and migrated to Australia with his family as a four-year-old. He was raised in Melbourne and Adelaide.

== Military career ==
Nikolic enlisted in the Australian Army in January 1979, and after completing recruit training, he was posted to the 1st Battalion, Royal Australian Regiment. Following 18 months' service as an infantry soldier, he attended the Officer Cadet School, Portsea, and returned to the infantry corps as a second lieutenant in June 1981. He subsequently served in the 3rd Battalion, Royal Australian Regiment (Parachute) for almost seven years as a Platoon Commander, Reconnaissance Platoon Commander, Company Commander (Alpha Company), and as the battalion operations officer.

As a captain, Nikolic studied history and politics at the University of Adelaide, where he served as adjutant of the Adelaide University Regiment from 1986 to 1988. After graduation, he taught tactics at the Royal Military College, Duntroon. As a lieutenant colonel, he served as the commanding officer and chief instructor of the Parachute Training School. He is a qualified static-line and free-fall parachute instructor, and in 2000–2001, he led the Army "Red Berets" Parachute Display Team. As a colonel, in 2003, Nikolic became the first commandant appointed to lead the Army Recruit Training Centre to have also graduated as a soldier.

In 2007, he was promoted to brigadier and appointed director general of public affairs, the principal spokesperson for the Department of Defence.

Nikolic's overseas postings include service as:

- a United Nations Military Observer in Israel, Syria and South Lebanon (November 1990 – November 1991);
- Chief of Staff and Deputy Commander of the Australian National Headquarters during the first deployment of Operation Slipper to Afghanistan (October 2001 – March 2002); and
- the National Command Representative for Australian Forces in Southern Iraq (February – October 2005).

In addition to his Australian command responsibilities in Southern Iraq, he concurrently served as Chief of Staff of the British-led Multinational Division (South East).

Nikolic holds a Bachelor of Arts in History and Politics from the University of Adelaide, a Bachelor of Social Science in Human Resources Development from Southern Cross University, a Master of Management Studies from the University of New South Wales, a Master of Arts in International Relations from Deakin University, and a Master of Strategic Studies from the United States Army War College. He is also a graduate of the Army Command and Staff College, Joint Services Staff College, Philippines Joint College, the United Nations Senior Leaders' Course, and the Australian Institute of Company Directors.

=== Civilian career in Department of Defence ===
From 2008 until 2011, Nikolic was employed in the Department of Defence as First Assistant Secretary, International Policy Division (a civilian Major General equivalent position), with responsibility for providing strategic level policy advice to government on Australia's international defence relations and Australian Defence Force operations.

== Political career ==
Nikolic's pre-selection as the Liberal Party candidate for the 2013 federal election for the seat of Bass in Tasmania - which had been held by the Labor Party since 2007 - was announced on 8 July 2011. He had expressed interest in contesting the seat of Bass after the leadup to the 2010 election when he was stationed in Canberra. Although an election was not required until 30 November 2013, Nikolic began campaigning actively soon after pre-selection. He set up a website for his candidacy, and his campaigning activities in the Launceston area were reported in the media, along with his confrontations with local environmentalists.

Following a satirical posting about him on Facebook in May 2012, it was reported that Nikolic had threatened to contact the employers of readers who "liked" the post. Nikolic denied making these threats, and later stated that he had no intention of contacting any employer; that his request was just for the posting to be removed. The story was published by international media. In July 2013, the story was subsequently the subject of a ruling by the Australian Press Council. In July 2013, in response to a complaint filed by Nikolic, the Australian Press Council found that The Sydney Morning Herald "failed to take reasonable steps to ensure accuracy and fairness" on some matters in its article on the subject.

In mid-August 2013, the then sitting member for Bass, Geoff Lyons, made false statements to high-school students about Nikolic's military career, claiming Nikolic had "misled" journalists about his role in the military. Lyons subsequently said he was "sincerely sorry" for his remarks about his opponent. Nikolic was elected in September 2013 with a swing of almost 11 percent.

On 13 February 2015, Nikolic was appointed Government Whip by Prime Minister Tony Abbott, following the dismissal of Philip Ruddock as Chief Government Whip. Nikolic was dropped as Government Whip on 20 September 2015 as a result of a ministerial reshuffle by the new prime minister, Malcolm Turnbull, who had been elected during a leadership spill earlier that month.

On 2 July 2016, Nikolic lost his seat to Ross Hart of the Australian Labor Party, after a 10.1% swing against him in the two party preferred vote.

== Family ==
Nikolic married Launceston-born Christine Symons in 1986. They have three children - two girls, and a boy. After being Canberra-based for many years, they moved to Launceston in 2011.

== Publications ==
- "Iran and the United States : Interests, Options, Consequences". USAWC Strategy Research Project. US Army War College, Carlisle Barracks, Pennsylvania. 30 March 2007. Archived from the original on 8 April 2013.
- "Let's not devalue our troops' role". The Examiner: 25. 13 November 2011.
- "Three views on how to make the North prosper". The Examiner. 19 November 2012.
- "HADR: in search of low-cost innovative solutions". Launceston, Tasmania: aspistrategist.org.au. 8 May 2013.

== Honours and awards ==
Ribbon	Award	Date and reference
	Member of the Order of Australia (AM)	26 January 2010
	Conspicuous Service Cross (CSC)	26 January 2002
	Australian Active Service Medal	
	Afghanistan Medal	
	Iraq Medal	
	Australian Service Medal	with two clasps 'South East Asia' and 'Middle East'
	Defence Force Service Medal with 2 Rosettes	for 25–29 years of service
	Australian Defence Medal	
	United Nations Medal	for service with the United Nations Truce Supervision Organization (UNTSO)
	Iraq Medal	(United Kingdom)
	Commendation for bravery	1987 (from the South Australian Commissioner of Police)

Parliament of Australia
Preceded by Geoff Lyons	Member for Bass; 2013–2016	Succeeded by Ross Hart
