= Bruce Kekwick =

Australian politician

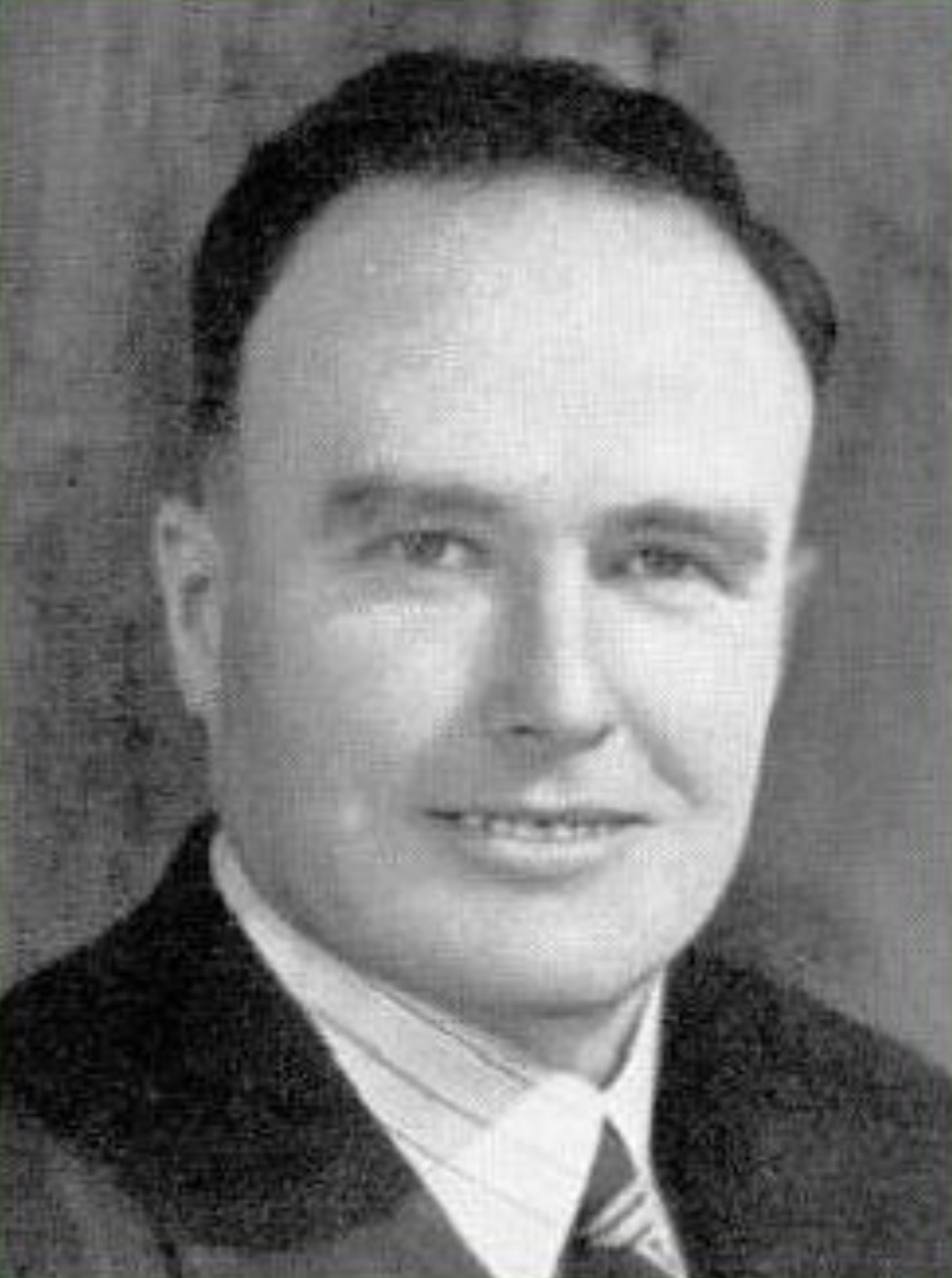

Member of the Australian Parliament for Bass
- In office 10 December 1949 – 29 May 1954
- Preceded by: Claude Barnard
- Succeeded by: Lance Barnard

Personal details
- Born: 24 April 1910 South Australia
- Died: 2 February 1982 (aged 71)
- Party: Liberal; Centre (1960s)
- Occupation: Insurance inspector

Bruce Huntley Kekwick (24 April 1910 – 2 February 1982) was an Australian politician. He was a member of the House of Representatives from 1949 to 1954, representing the Tasmanian seat of Bass for the Liberal Party.

== Early life ==
Kekwick was born on 24 April 1910. He was educated in Adelaide.

In 1940, Kekwick enlisted in the Royal Australian Naval Volunteer Reserve as a writer (clerk). He was promoted to sub-lieutenant in 1945 and lieutenant in 1946, being discharged in the same year. He served in New Guinea and the Pacific during the war.

Kekwik settled in Launceston, Tasmania, after the war's end, where he worked in insurance as an inspector for Commercial Union. He was also treasurer of Launceston's Junior Chamber of Commerce.

== Politics ==
Kekwick became involved in politics through the Citizens' League, an organisation formed in the late 1940s to oppose the Chifley government's plans to nationalise the private banking industry. He appeared regularly on radio broadcasts on the league. In public addresses he described bank nationalisation as the "most revolutionary measure brought forward by any government in Australia" and "a subterfuge to cover the institution of complete socialisation".

Kekwick was elected to the House of Representatives at the 1949 federal election, winning the seat of Bass for the Liberal Party. He defeated incumbent MP and government minister Claude Barnard of the Australian Labor Party (ALP). He was re-elected at the 1951 election, but lost his seat to Barnard's son Lance Barnard at the 1954 election.

In 1950, Kekwick publicly opposed plans to merge Australian National Airways and Trans Australia Airlines, threatening to cross the floor if the Menzies government introduced merger legislation. He was interested in industrial relations, serving as chair of the Liberal Party's industrial relations policy committee and putting forward proposals for long service leave insurance and reforms to the waterside industry, including the abolition of the Australian Stevedoring Industry Board.

Kekwick joined the Centre Party (the revived Tasmanian branch of the Country Party) in the late 1960s and served as the party's state president in the lead-up to the 1969 state election. He was involved in negotiations with the Centre Party's leader Kevin Lyons after the election which saw the Centre Party enter into a coalition with the Liberals.

== Personal life ==
According to the Launceston Examiner, Kekwick was "well-known in the musical world" and served as secretary of the Launceston Philharmonic Society. He sang as a tenor and continued to give recitals as a soloist during his time in parliament.

Kekwick died on 2 February 1982, aged 71.

Parliament of Australia
| Preceded by Claude Barnard | Member for Bass; 1949 – 1954 | Succeeded by Lance Barnard |
