= Claude Barnard =

Australian politician (1890–1957)

The Honourable Claude Barnard
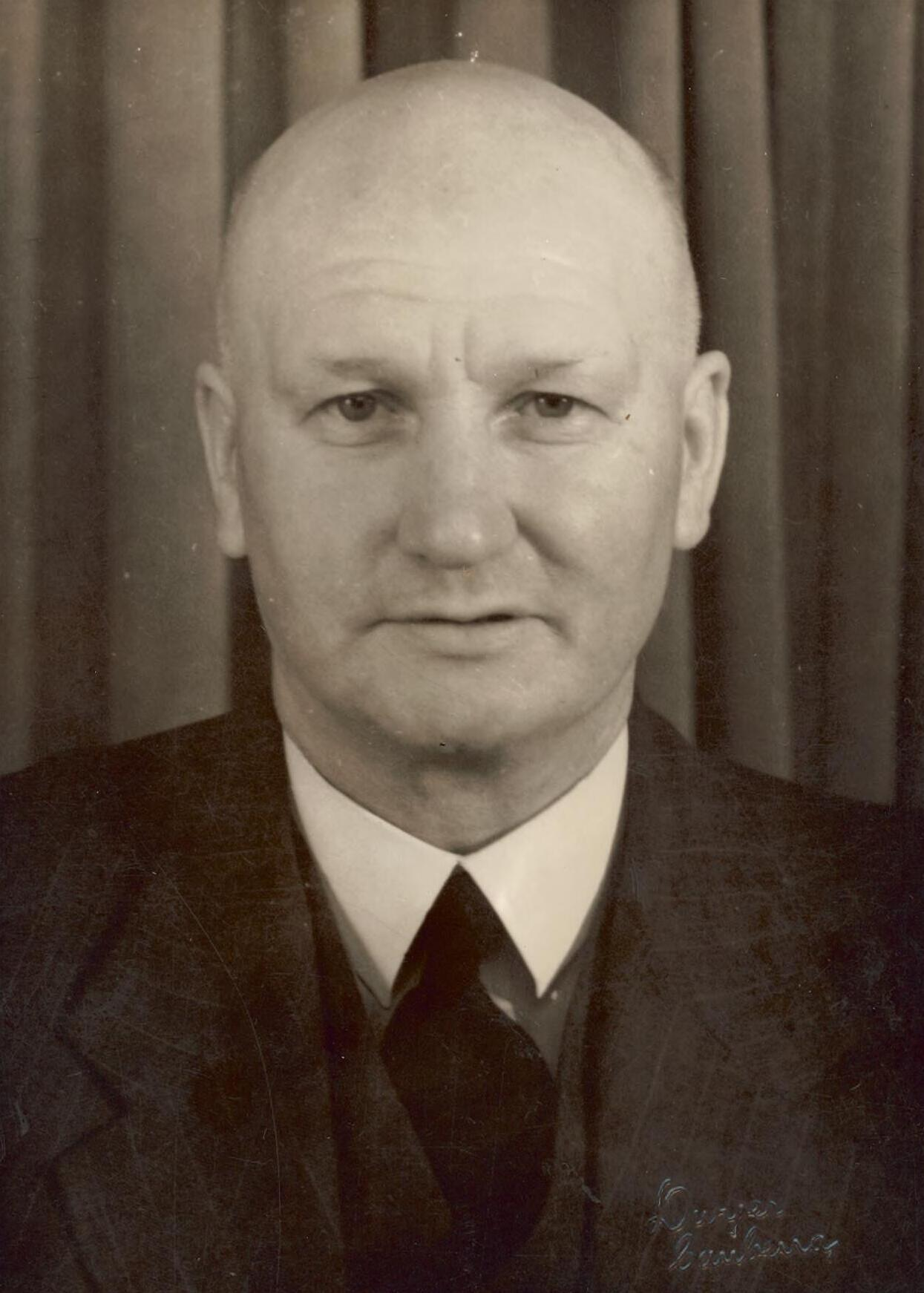

Minister for Repatriation
- In office 1 November 1946 – 19 December 1949
- Prime Minister: Ben Chifley
- Preceded by: Charles Frost
- Succeeded by: Walter Cooper

Member of the Australian Parliament for Bass
- In office 15 September 1934 – 10 December 1949
- Preceded by: Allan Guy
- Succeeded by: Bruce Kekwick

Personal details
- Born: 16 October 1890 Mole Creek, Tasmania, Australia
- Died: 6 December 1957 (aged 67) Launceston, Tasmania, Australia
- Party: Labor
- Spouse: Martha Melva McKenzie (m. 1912)
- Relations: Lance Barnard (son)
- Occupation: Engine driver

Herbert Claude Barnard (16 October 1890 – 6 December 1957) was an Australian politician. He was a member of the Australian Labor Party (ALP) and represented the Division of Bass in federal parliament from 1934 to 1949. He served as Minister for Repatriation in the Chifley government from 1946 to 1949. His son Lance Barnard also entered federal politics and served as Deputy Prime Minister of Australia in the 1970s.

== Early life ==
Barnard was born on 16 October 1890 in Mole Creek, Tasmania. He was the son of Charlotte (née Tipper) and Ernest Walter Barnard; his father was a wheelwright.

Barnard attended the state school at Invermay, leaving school at the age of fourteen to work in a plant nursery. He joined Tasmanian Government Railways in 1909, progressing from engine-cleaner to fireman to engine-driver, based out of Launceston. Barnard served as state secretary of the Australian Federated Union of Locomotive Enginemen. He was also president or secretary of the Launceston Trades Hall Council on several occasions.

== Federal politics ==
Barnard stood unsuccessfully at the 1931 election as the Australian Labor Party candidate for the seat of Bass in the Australian House of Representatives. In 1933, he became state secretary of the party and at the 1934 election he won Bass. From 1941 to 1946, he was chairman of the joint parliamentary committee on social security, which developed much of the Curtin and Chifley governments' social policy agenda. In November 1946, he was appointed Minister for Repatriation in the second Chifley Ministry. Although one of his sons was killed in the war and the other two were injured, he was under constant attack from service organisations and others for not delivering more for war veterans and, like his predecessor, Charles Frost, in 1946, he lost his seat at the 1949 election, in his case, to Liberal candidate Bruce Kekwick. Barnard's son Lance as the ALP candidate would later defeat Kekwick in Bass at the 1954 election.

== State politics ==
In 1950, Barnard was elected to represent the Tasmanian House of Assembly division of Bass and held it until his death in 1957.

== Personal life ==
Barnard married Martha McKenzie in 1912, with whom he had four children. His son Lance Barnard was deputy prime minister in the Whitlam government, while his nephew Eric and grandson Michael were also members of parliament.

Barnard died of cancer on 6 December 1957 at Launceston Public Hospital, aged 67. He was granted a state funeral.

Political offices
Preceded by Charles Frost	Minister for Repatriation; 1946–1949	Succeeded by Walter Cooper
Parliament of Australia
Preceded by Allan Guy	Member for Bass; 1934–1949	Succeeded by Bruce Kekwick
