= Jens Jensen (politician) =

Australian politician (1865–1936)

The Honourable Jens Jensen
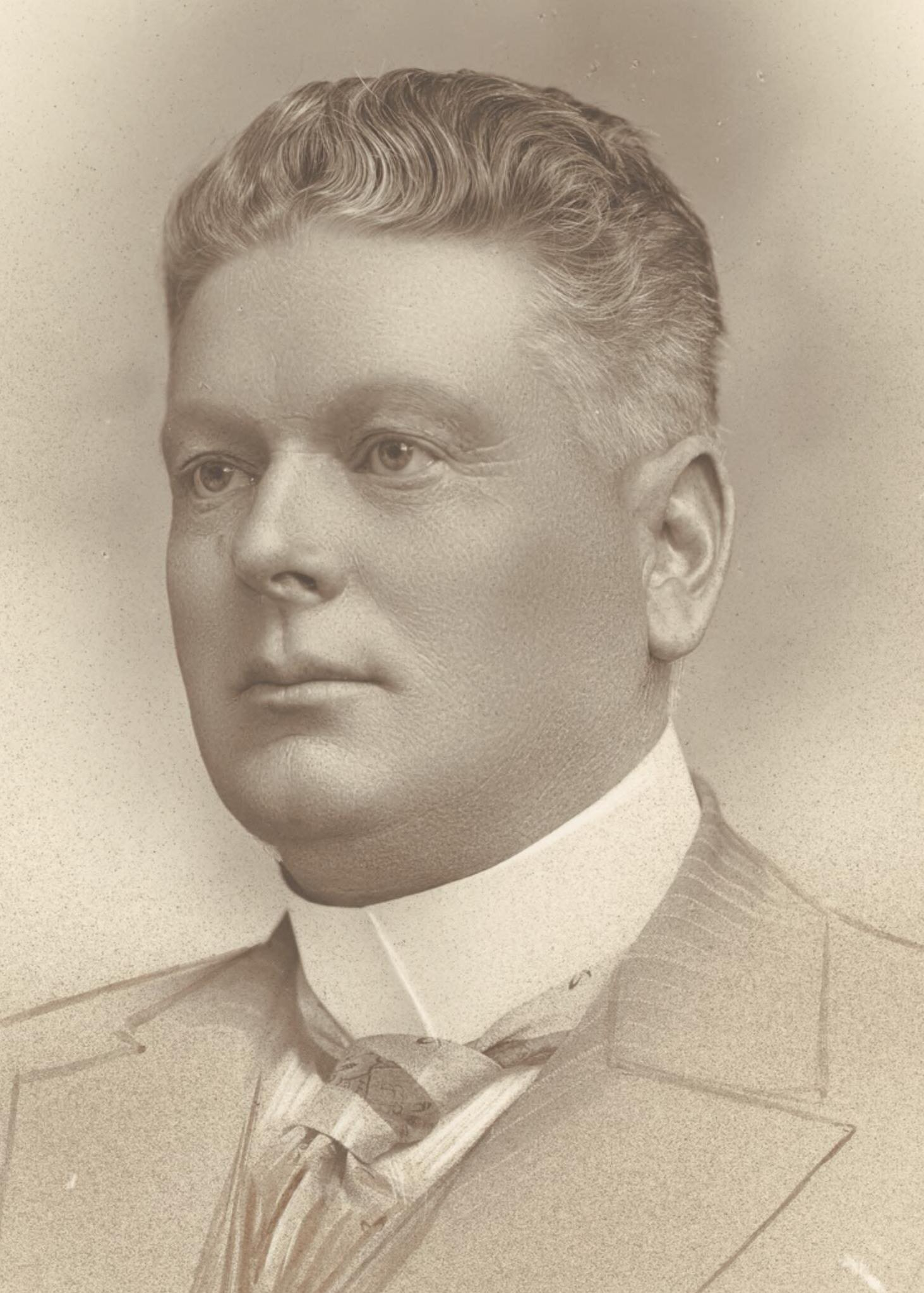

Minister for Trade and Customs
- In office 17 February 1917 – 13 December 1918
- Prime Minister: Billy Hughes
- Preceded by: William Archibald
- Succeeded by: William Watt

Minister for the Navy
- In office 12 July 1915 – 17 February 1917
- Prime Minister: Andrew Fisher; Billy Hughes
- Preceded by: New office
- Succeeded by: Joseph Cook

Member of the Australian Parliament for Bass
- In office 13 April 1910 – 13 December 1919
- Preceded by: David Storrer
- Succeeded by: Syd Jackson

Personal details
- Born: 2 May 1865 Sebastopol, Victoria, Australia
- Died: 16 November 1936 (aged 71) South Caulfield, Victoria, Australia
- Resting place: St Kilda Cemetery
- Party: Labor (to 1916, from 1927); National Labor (1916–17); Nationalist (1917–19); Independent (1919–27)
- Spouses: Elizabeth Broadhurst (m. 1885; died 1894) Bertha Hopton (m. 1896)

Jens August Jensen (2 May 1865 – 16 November 1936) was an Australian politician who served in the House of Representatives from 1910 to 1919. He was a minister in the governments of Andrew Fisher and Billy Hughes, serving as Minister for the Navy from 1915 to 1917 and Minister for Trade and Customs from 1917 to 1918.

== Early life ==
Jensen was born on 2 May 1865 in Sebastopol, Victoria, on the outskirts of Ballarat. He was the third son of Anna Marie Christine (née Peterson) and Anthon Jensen, Danish immigrants who had immigrated to Australia during the Victorian gold rush. His father was reputedly a veteran of the First Schleswig War between Denmark and Germany.

Jensen attended state schools until the age of 11, when he began working as a stable boy. He moved to Beaconsfield, Tasmania, in 1878 and worked as a rabbit hawker and miner; he eventually gained his engine driver's certificate. In 1885, Jensen married Elizabeth Frances Broadhurst. The couple had one son and four daughters before her death in 1894. He remarried in 1896 to Bertha Hopton, with whom he had another son and daughter. Also in 1896, Jensen built a hotel and theatre in Beaconsfield. He later opened a larger establishment at Beauty Point, and bought an orchard nearby. He was elected to the Beaconsfield Town Council in 1899.

== Political career ==
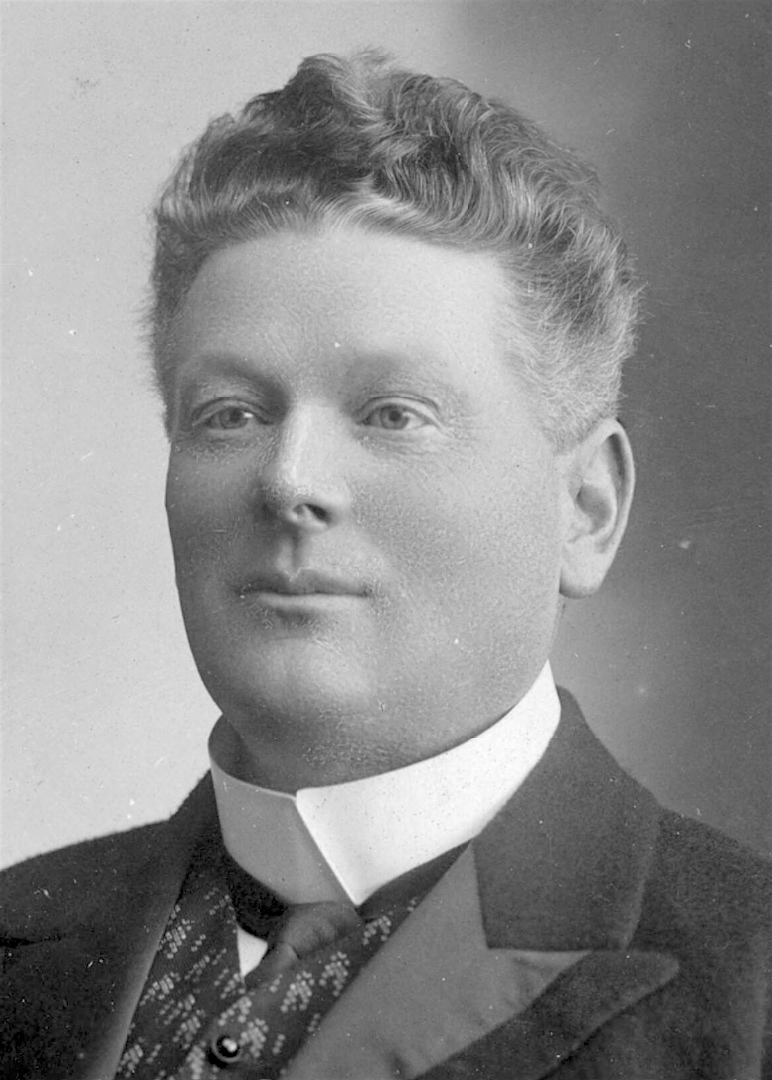
Jens Jensen (undated photo)

=== State politics ===
Jensen was elected to the Tasmanian House of Assembly at the 1903 state election, winning the seat of George Town. He was a member of the Launceston branch of the Reform League, one of Tasmania's earliest formal political organisations. In parliament he supported the faction of liberal democrats associated with William Propsting, who formed a government after the election.

In June 1903, Jensen was admitted to the membership of the Tasmanian Workers' Political League – the forerunner of the Australian Labor Party in Tasmania – after attending the organisation's inaugural state conference and signing the pledge required of parliamentary members. He was re-elected in George Town as an endorsed Labor candidate at the 1906 state election, before transferring to the new multi-member seat of Wilmot at the 1909 election. He was appointed Chief Secretary in John Earle's eight-day government in June 1909, the first time the ALP had held office in Tasmania.

=== Federal politics ===
In February 1910 he resigned from the House of Assembly and won the seat of Bass in the House of Representatives at the April 1910 election. He served as an Assistant Minister and then in July 1915 he became the first Minister for the Navy in the Fisher and Hughes governments. When a group of pro-conscription ALP members under Billy Hughes broke away in the 1916 Labor split to form the National Labor Party, Jensen joined them. Hughes retained government after the split, and Jensen was appointed Minister for Trade and Customs.

As trade minister, Jensen was involved in the creation of an independent Australian trade commissioner service. In June 1918 he published "an extensive report on Australia's trade representation abroad that would link with but not rely upon the British consular service". It proposed the appointment of Australian trade commissioners in Canada, Japan, Russia, South Africa and the United States, and the creation of a bureau of trade information within the Department of Trade and Customs. The bureau was subsequently established as the Bureau of Commerce and Industry, while a Board of Trade was also created in 1918 modelled on the British equivalent.

Along with the other members of National Labor, Jensen joined the Commonwealth Liberal Party in forming the Nationalist Party of Australia. In 1918, Jensen was investigated by the Royal Commission on Navy and Defence Administration. When the Commission found against him, he was forced to resign from the ministry. He subsequently lost his endorsement to contest his seat at the 1919 election. Though he attempted to contest the seat as an independent, he was defeated by the endorsed Nationalist candidate, Syd Jackson.

Jensen subsequently shifted to state politics, elected to the Tasmanian House of Assembly seat of Bass in 1922. After losing his seat in 1925, he rejoined the ALP in 1927, and was elected for Wilmot, holding it until 1934.

== Personal life ==
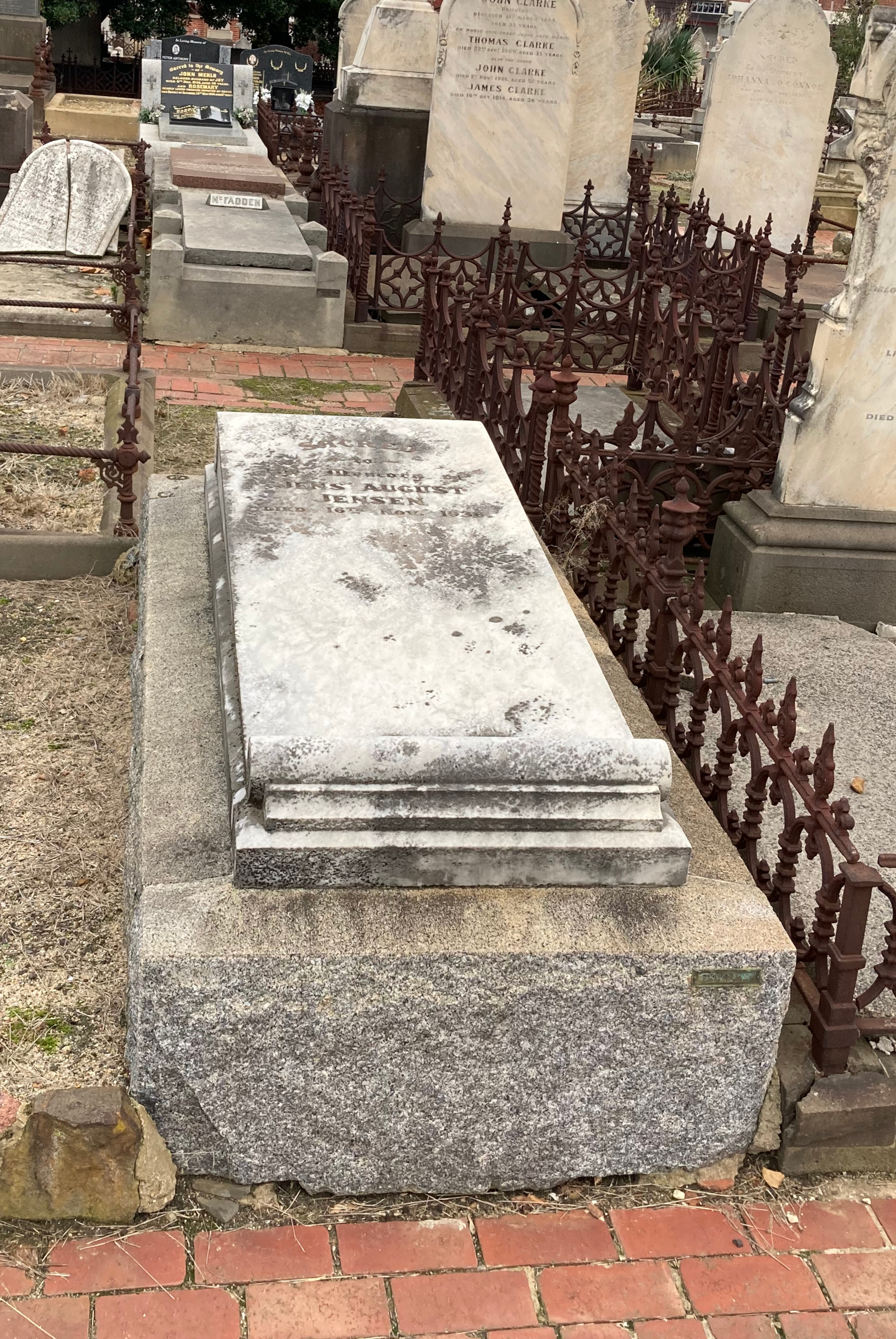
Jensen's grave at St Kilda Cemetery

In 1885, Jensen married Elizabeth Broadhurst, with whom he had five children. He was widowed in 1894 and remarried in 1896 to Bertha Hopton, a domestic servant. He had three further children from his second marriage, one of whom predeceased him, and according to the Australian Dictionary of Biography was "at times violent at home and showed his second wife little affection".

Jensen suffered from diabetes later in life and died of cerebrovascular disease on 16 November 1936 at a private hospital in Caulfield South, Victoria.

=== Affair and will dispute ===
Jensen had a long-running extramarital affair with his cousin Maggie Jane Gilbert. He formally separated from his second wife in 1927 and paid her alimony, although she had reportedly instituted divorce proceedings shortly before his death. Jensen settled the majority of his estate on Gilbert, with four of his children subsequently lodging a caveat against the will on the grounds of undue influence.

In their suit, Jensen's children alleged that he had fathered a daughter out of wedlock with Gilbert, and that he had attempted to arrange a marriage between this daughter and one of his legitimate sons, who were half-siblings. They further alleged that Jensen had given Gilbert almost all of his property and wealth prior to his death, including a block of flats at Beauty Point, an estate in northern Tasmania, and valuable shareholdings. Jensen's widow Bertha was called as a witness and stated that her husband had physically abused their children, including with a horsewhip, as well as alleging that Gilbert had tried to poison him.

The presiding judge Charles Duffy ultimately granted probate and removed the caveat, finding that the claim of undue influence had not been made out although he accepted the evidence of Jensen's widow and children as to his character and personal life.

Parliament of Australia
New title	Minister for the Navy; 1915–1917	Succeeded by Joseph Cook
Preceded by William Archibald	Minister for Trade and Customs; 1917–1919	Succeeded by William Watt
Parliament of Australia
Preceded by David Storrer	Member for Bass; 1910–1919	Succeeded by Syd Jackson
