= Ross Hart (politician) =

Australian politician and lawyer (born 1960)

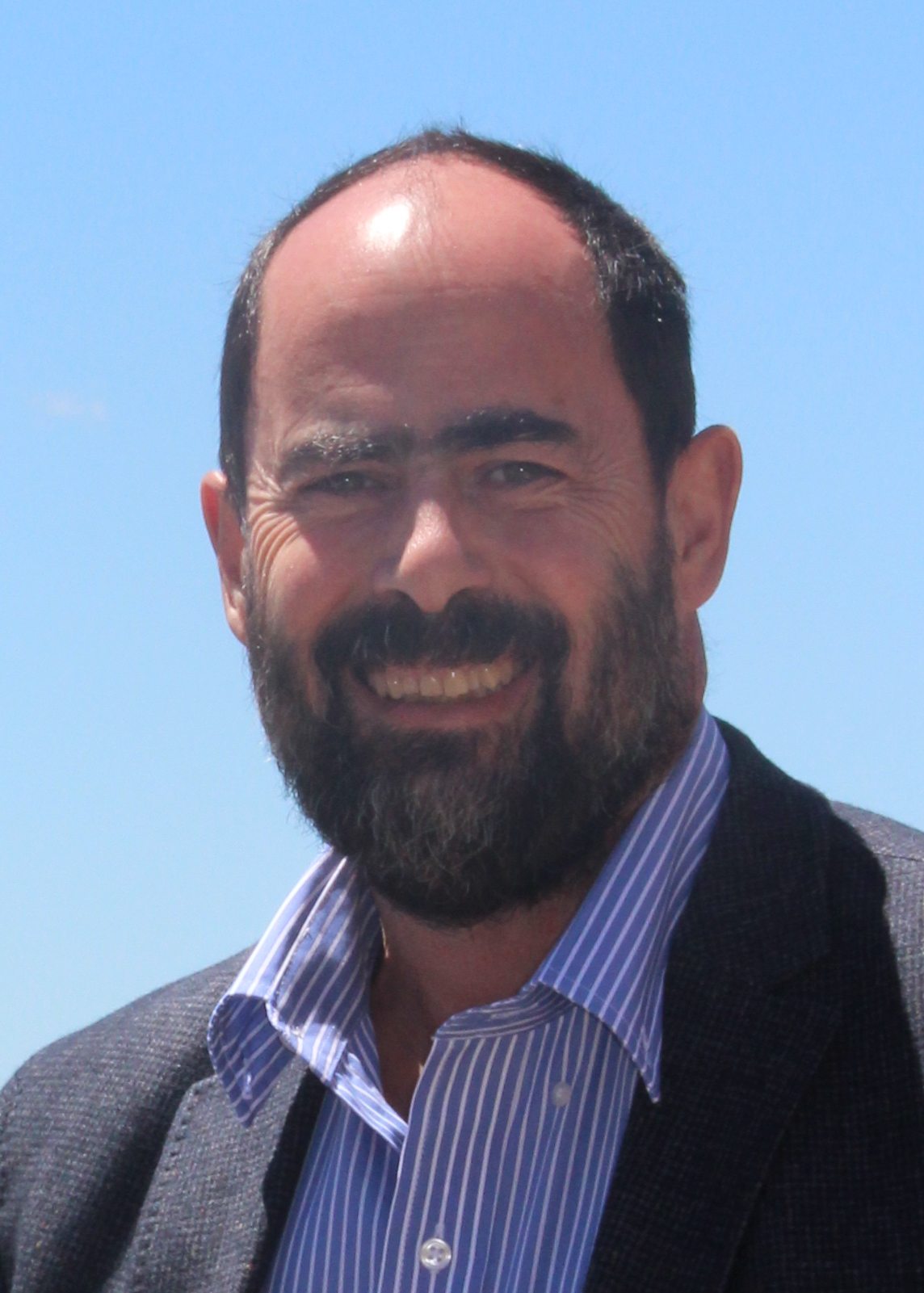

Member of the Australian Parliament for Bass
- In office 2 July 2016 – 18 May 2019
- Preceded by: Andrew Nikolic
- Succeeded by: Bridget Archer

Personal details
- Born: Ross Anthony Hart; 4 June 1960 (age 66) Launceston, Tasmania, Australia
- Party: Australian Labor Party
- Spouse: Ann Hart
- Children: 1
- Education: University of Tasmania
- Occupation: Legal practitioner
- Committees: House Administration and Appropriation Committee Parliamentary Communications Technology Advisory Board Parliamentary Joint Public Accounts and Audit Committee Joint Standing Committee on Trade and Investment Growth
- Website: https://rosshartmp.com/

Ross Anthony Hart (born 4 June 1960) is a former Australian politician. He was the Australian Labor Party member for Bass from the 2016 federal election in which he defeated the sitting member, the Liberal Party of Australia's Andrew Nikolic with a 10.6 point swing against him. He lost the seat to Liberal Bridget Archer at the 2019 election.

== Early life and education ==
Hart was born in Launceston, Tasmania. He was educated at Launceston Church Grammar School and the University of Tasmania, where he graduated with a Bachelor of Laws degree in 1984.

== Legal career ==
Hart was admitted to practice in 1985, and began work as a commercial litigation lawyer at Hill, Gunton and Patmore in Launceston, which subsequently became Rae and Partners. He was appointed a partner in 1988 and then served as a Director and Managing Partner of the firm until 2016. Hart remains a consultant of the firm.

Hart was a Councillor of the Law Society of Tasmania from 1989 to 2006, President from 1993 to 1994, and the Tasmanian Representative on the Law Council of Australia from 1995 to 1998.

He was a founding director of the Northern Tasmanian Regional Development Board from 1993 to 2005 and a director of the Inveresk Railyards Management Authority from 1998 to 2000, which focused on advancing the future of Launceston and Northern Tasmania.

He was also a member of the governing council of the Tasmanian Health Organisation North, which was charged with the delivery of health services across Northern Tasmania and operated the Launceston General Hospital from 2012 to 2015, and board member of the Launceston Church Grammar School from 2008 to 2016.

== Politics ==
Hart is a member of the Labor Party's Left faction, who was previously campaign manager for Michelle O'Byrne, a previous Federal Member for Bass.

Hart was elected as the Federal Member for Bass in July 2016 and was a member of the House Administration and Appropriation Committee and the Parliamentary Communications Technology Advisory Board. He was also a member of the Parliamentary Joint Public Accounts and Audit Committee, and the Joint Standing committee of Trade and Investment Growth.

On 27 June 2018, Hart repeatedly refused to back Federal Labor Party leader Bill Shorten's proposed reversal of medium business tax cuts in a radio interview with Brian Carlton, which Shorten ultimately backed down on the next day.

Parliament of Australia
Preceded by Andrew Nikolic	Member for Bass; 2016–2019	Succeeded by Bridget Archer
