= Lance Barnard =

Australian politician and diplomat

The Honourable Lance Barnard AO
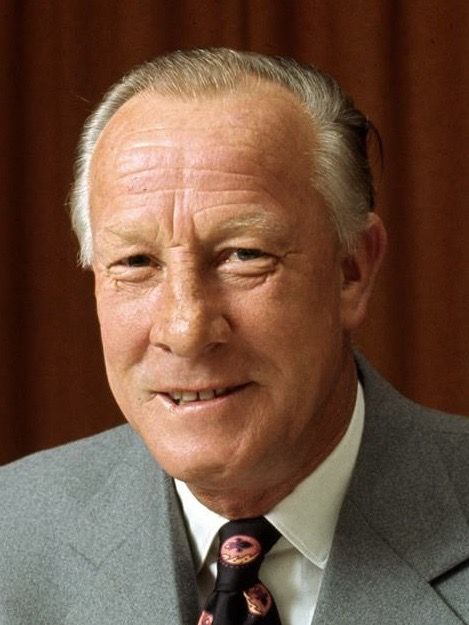
- Barnard in 1973

Deputy Prime Minister of Australia
- In office 5 December 1972 – 12 June 1974
- Prime Minister: Gough Whitlam
- Preceded by: Doug Anthony
- Succeeded by: Jim Cairns

Minister for Defence
- In office 5 December 1972 – 6 June 1975
- Prime Minister: Gough Whitlam
- Preceded by: David Fairbairn
- Succeeded by: Bill Morrison

Deputy Leader of the Labor Party
- In office 8 February 1967 – 12 June 1974
- Leader: Gough Whitlam
- Preceded by: Gough Whitlam
- Succeeded by: Jim Cairns

Member of the Australian Parliament for Bass
- In office 29 May 1954 – 2 June 1975
- Preceded by: Bruce Kekwick
- Succeeded by: Kevin Newman

Personal details
- Born: Lance Herbert Barnard; 1 May 1919 Launceston, Tasmania, Australia
- Died: 6 August 1997 (aged 78) Melbourne, Victoria, Australia
- Party: Labor
- Spouses: Doris Burston (m. 1943; died 1960) Jill Cant (m. 1962)
- Relations: Claude Barnard (father); Michael Barnard (nephew); Eric Barnard (cousin); Harry Cant (father-in-law)
- Occupation: School teacher

Military service
- Allegiance: Australia
- Branch/service: Australian Army
- Years of service: 1940–1945
- Rank: Bombardier
- Unit: Royal Australian Artillery
- Battles/wars: Second World War * Second Battle of El Alamein

Lance Herbert Barnard AO (1 May 1919 – 6 August 1997) was an Australian politician and diplomat who served as the third deputy prime minister of Australia from 1972 to 1974. He was the deputy leader of the Australian Labor Party (ALP) from 1967 to 1974 and held senior ministerial offices in the Whitlam government.

Barnard was born in Launceston, Tasmania, into a prominent political family; his father Claude Barnard was also a federal government minister. He was a timber worker, soldier and schoolteacher before entering politics himself. He was elected to the House of Representatives at the 1954 federal election, winning the seat of Bass that his father had lost five years earlier. Barnard was elected deputy to Gough Whitlam in 1967 and became deputy prime minister following the ALP's victory at the 1972 election.

After an initial "duumvirate" in which he and Whitlam both held multiple portfolios, Barnard was appointed Minister for Defence. He subsequently oversaw the merger of several smaller departments into the Department of Defence. In 1974, Barnard lost the deputy leadership to Jim Cairns but remained in the defence portfolio. He resigned from parliament in 1975 to become ambassador to Norway, Finland and Sweden, triggering a by-election that resulted in the loss of his seat to the Liberal Party.

== Early life ==
Barnard was born on 1 May 1919 in Launceston, Tasmania. He was one of four children born to Herbert Claude Barnard and the former Martha Melva McKenzie. His father, a trade unionist and locomotive driver, was elected to parliament in 1934, and was a minister in the Chifley government.

Barnard attended Launceston Junior Technical School. He left school during the Great Depression and worked in a timberyard for a few years. He began training as a schoolteacher by attending night school. In 1940, Barnard enlisted in the Australian Army. He fought with the 9th Division in the Middle East and Africa, including in the Battle of El Alamein. His military service left him with a permanent hearing impairment. After returning to Australia in 1945, Barnard qualified as a school teacher and subsequently taught mathematics in various Tasmanian schools.

== Political career ==
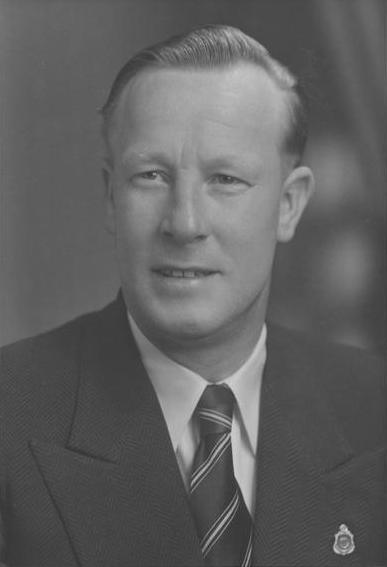
Barnard in the 1950s.

At the 1954 federal election, Barnard was elected to the Division of Bass for the Labor Party. He defeated the sitting Liberal member Bruce Kekwick, who had defeated Claude Barnard for the seat in 1949. He was later elected to the ALP Federal Executive and a delegate to Federal Conference, where he "more than once put up spirited battles against left-wing influence".

Following the ALP's defeat at the 1966 federal election, Arthur Calwell resigned as party leader and was succeeded by his deputy Gough Whitlam. Barnard was then elected deputy leader with the endorsement of Whitlam, defeating Jim Cairns by 35 votes to 33 on the final ballot following the elimination of Frank Crean. At the time he was described in The Canberra Times as "a personal friend of Mr Whitlam and a competent if not brilliant speaker in the House, mainly on his father's subject of repatriation, and social services".

=== Whitlam government ===
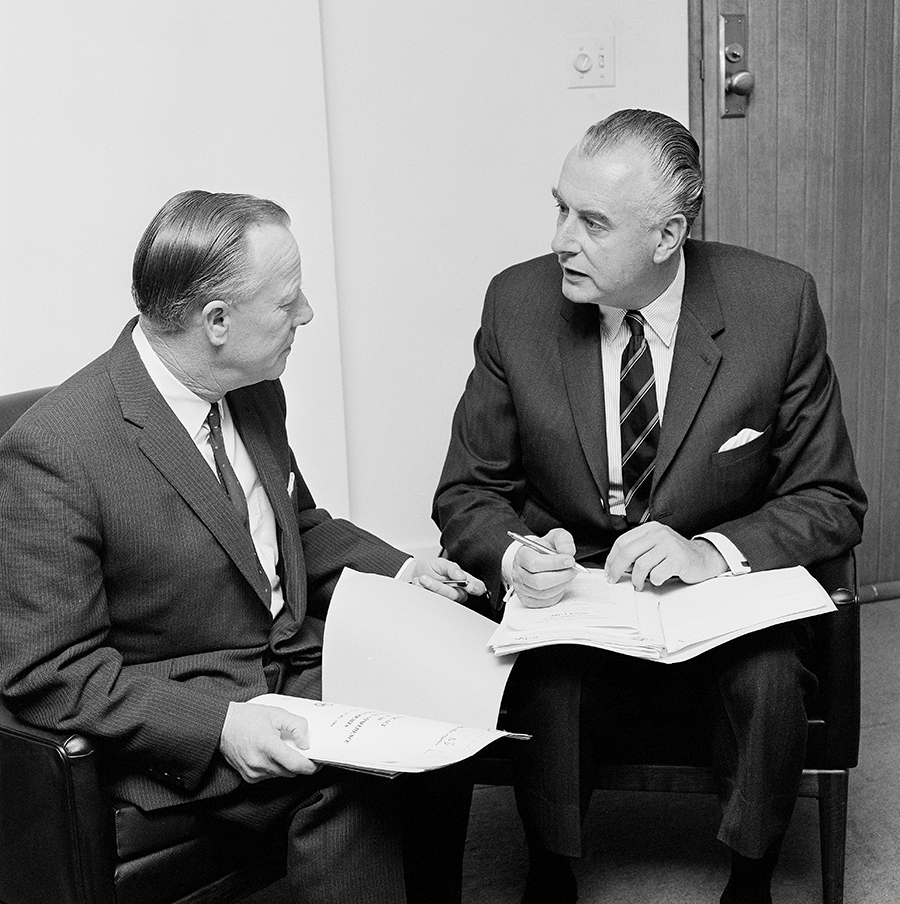
Barnard (left) with Gough Whitlam in 1969

When the ALP won the 1972 federal election Barnard became deputy prime minister. For the first two weeks of Whitlam's government, before the full electoral result was known, Whitlam and Barnard formed a two-man ministry, known as a duumvirate, to govern until a full ministry could be announced. Barnard held 14 portfolios including Defence and Immigration. Following the announcement of a complete ministry, Barnard served as Minister for Defence. He personally ensured the recommendations of the Jess Committee and new Defense Force Retirements Benefits Scheme was implemented in 1972.

Following the 1974 federal election, Barnard was challenged for Labor's deputy leadership by Jim Cairns. He was defeated by 54 votes to 42. Contemporary sources reporting that he was receiving "fairly active" support from Whitlam, and that Whitlam was "actively canvassing" for him. However, it was later reported that he had received "only token support" from the prime minister.

== Later years ==
In June 1975, Whitlam announced that Barnard would leave politics to become Australia's resident ambassador to Sweden, with accreditation also to Finland and Norway. He presented his credentials to King Carl XVI Gustaf on 10 September. Bass was resoundingly lost to the Liberals at the ensuing by-election, in which Labor lost 17 per cent of its primary vote. This shock result was seen by many as the beginning of the end for the Whitlam government, which was dismissed five months later.

Barnard returned to Launceston after completing his term as ambassador in 1978. The following year he won ALP preselection to recontest his old seat of Bass, but withdrew four months later for health reasons. In May 1981 he was nominated by the Fraser government as director of the Office of Australian War Graves. He retired in 1983.

Barnard died in Melbourne on 6 August 1997 at the age of 78, following vascular surgery. In response Gough Whitlam stated that "My partnership with Lance Barnard was the most satisfying and significant of my political life. I have lost my oldest and best mate".

== Personal life ==
Barnard married Doris Burston on 6 March 1943. They had two daughters together, Patricia and Suzanne. He was widowed in September 1960.

Barnard married a second time on 11 September 1962 to Jill Cant, the daughter of Senator Harry Cant of Western Australia. They had a son together, Nicholas, and also adopted two Vietnamese orphan girls, Amanda and Jacqueline; Amanda died as an infant.

Political offices
Preceded by Doug Anthony	Deputy Prime Minister of Australia; 1972–1974	Succeeded by Jim Cairns
Preceded by David Fairbairn	Minister for Defence; 1972–1975	Succeeded by Bill Morrison
Preceded by Tom Drake-Brockman	Minister for Air; 1972–1973	Abolished
Preceded by Bob Katter	Minister for the Army; 1972–1973	Abolished
Preceded by Malcolm Mackay	Minister for the Navy; 1972–1973	Abolished
Preceded by Victor Garland	Minister for Supply; 1972–1973	Succeeded by Kep Enderby
Parliament of Australia
Preceded by Bruce Kekwick	Member for Bass; 1954–1975	Succeeded by Kevin Newman
Party political offices
Preceded by Gough Whitlam	Deputy Leader of the Australian Labor Party; 1967–1974	Succeeded by Jim Cairns
Diplomatic posts
Preceded by John Petherbridge	Australian Ambassador to Sweden; Australian Ambassador to Norway; Australian Ambassador to Finland; 1975–1978	Succeeded by Brian Hill
