= Jodie Campbell =

Australian politician (born 1972)

Member of the Australian Parliament for Bass
- In office 24 November 2007 – 19 July 2010
- Preceded by: Michael Ferguson
- Succeeded by: Geoff Lyons

Personal details
- Born: 18 January 1972 (age 54) Queenstown, Tasmania, Australia
- Party: Labor
- Occupation: Legal secretary, call centre supervisor

Jodie Louise Campbell (born 18 January 1972) is a former Australian politician. She was a member of the House of Representatives from 2007 to 2010, representing the Tasmanian seat of Bass for the Australian Labor Party (ALP). She had previously served as deputy mayor of Launceston from 2005 to 2007.

== Early life ==
Campbell was born in Queenstown, Tasmania. She grew up in Launceston as one of four daughters raised by a single mother, Patricia Crooks, who worked at a wool mill. Her grandfather was a returned soldier who spent several years as a Japanese prisoner-of-war in Changi Prison.

Campbell attended Ravenswood High School in Launceston's eastern suburbs. Prior to entering politics she worked as a legal secretary at Clarke and Gee Lawyers from 1989 to 1997 and then as a team leader with Ansett Australia from 1997 to 2001. She was working at the call centre in Launceston when the airline collapsed, subsequently using her position as an Australian Services Union delegate to campaign for the recovery of staff entitlements.

== Politics ==
Campbell served as an alderman on the Launceston City Council from 2002 to 2007, including as deputy mayor from 2005. In January 2007 she won ALP preselection for the Division of Bass, after reversing an earlier decision not to stand, and formally resigned from the council in September 2007. At the 2007 federal election she narrowly defeated the incumbent Liberal MP Michael Ferguson on a 3.6-point two-party-preferred swing. In her maiden speech she quoted Ben Chifley's "light on the hill" speech.

In parliament Campbell served on three House of Representatives standing committees. She was a member of the Labor Left faction, specifically a "breakaway sub-faction" known as the Progressive Policy Forum, associated with state MPs David and Michelle O'Byrne.

On 30 October 2009, Campbell announced she would not be re-contesting her seat at the next election, citing family reasons. The following day, Sue Neales of The Mercury reported that Campbell was pushed into her decision by Labor Party powerbrokers, who had wanted to get rid of her for some time and considered her preselection a mistake. Neales reported that Campbell had two convictions for driving offences on her record, and Labor powerbrokers feared any further offences would potentially cause embarrassment for the party. They were also annoyed with the number of days she took off (due to her rapidly declining mental health) and her level of work within the electorate, fearing losing the seat if Campbell stood again.

== Personal life ==
Campbell has two daughters. In August 2009, her de facto partner Roland Small appeared in court to face charges of assaulting her. It was alleged that he "punched Ms Campbell in the left eye, twisted her fingers and hit her in the stomach."

Parliament of Australia
Preceded by Michael Ferguson	Member for Bass; 2007–2010	Succeeded by Geoff Lyons
