= Division of Bass =

Australian federal electoral division in Tasmania

Coordinates: 41.130°S 147.616°E

Bass Australian House of Representatives Division
- Interactive map of boundaries since the 2019 federal election
- Created: 1903
- MP: Jess Teesdale
- Party: Labor
- Namesake: George Bass
- Electors: 80,392 (2025)
- Area: 7,975 km^{2} (3,079.2 sq mi)
- Demographic: Provincial
- State electorate: Bass
Electorates around Bass:
| Bass Strait | Bass Strait | Bass Strait |
| Braddon | Bass | Tasman Sea |
| Lyons | Lyons | Lyons |

The Division of Bass is an Australian electoral division in Tasmania.

The division is located in the north east of Tasamania, and has always included most of the city of Launceston. Being in the north east of the state, it has also always included the Furneaux Group of islands. It has traditionally been a marginal seat and has had more members than any other federal electorate, at 18 members (as of 2026) since 1903, including one who served twice.

== Geography ==
Since 1984, federal electoral division boundaries in Australia have been determined at redistributions by a redistribution committee appointed by the Australian Electoral Commission. Redistributions occur for the boundaries of divisions in a particular state, and they occur every seven years, or sooner if a state's representation entitlement changes or when divisions of a state are malapportioned.

Prior to 1903, the entire state of Tasmania was covered by a single Division of Tasmania. In 1903, the division was split into five divisions, with one of them being Bass. Since then, the division of Bass has always included most of Launceston in its south-west corner, often on the edge of the seat's boundaries. As of 2025, three-quarters of Bass voters lived in the Launceston metropolitan area.

Since the 2019 election, Bass covers the entire local government areas of Launceston, George Town, West Tamar, Dorset and Flinders (Furneaux Group of islands). With effect from the next federal election, it will also include the local government area of Break O'Day.

== History ==
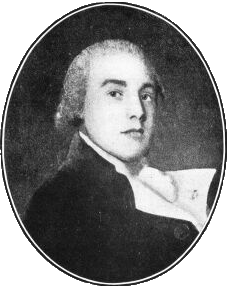
George Bass, the division's namesake

The division was one of the five established when the former Division of Tasmania was redistributed on 2 October 1903 and is named for the explorer George Bass. It has always been based on the city of Launceston and surrounding rural areas, and its boundaries have changed very little in the century since its creation and first use in 1909. For most of its history it has been a marginal seat, changing hands between the Australian Labor Party and the conservative parties—since 1949 the Liberal Party. Its most notable member has been Lance Barnard, who was Deputy Prime Minister in the Whitlam government. His resignation in 1975 was followed by Labor's heavy defeat in the Bass by-election, which is seen as the beginning of the end of the Whitlam government.

Bridget Archer of the Liberal Party won the seat at the 2019 election, retaining it for two terms before losing it to Jess Teesdale of the Labor Party in the 2025 election.

Due to the constant changing hands between both major parties, Bass has had the most different members of any federal electorate at eighteen (as of 2026), including one who served twice. Five of these members who lost the seat at federal elections were later elected to the Tasmanian House of Assembly for the state electorate of the same name, and three of the four had done so this century. Two other members were also elected to state parliament in a different seat.

== Members ==
| Image | Member | Party | Term | Notes |
|---|---|---|---|---|
| | David Storrer (1854–1935) | Protectionist | 16 December 1903 – 26 May 1909 | Previously held the Tasmanian House of Assembly seat of Launceston. Lost seat |
| | David Storrer (1854–1935) | Independent | 26 May 1909 – 13 April 1910 | Previously held the Tasmanian House of Assembly seat of Launceston. Lost seat |
| | Jens Jensen (1865–1936) | Labor | 13 April 1910 – 14 November 1916 | Previously held the Tasmanian House of Assembly seat of Wilmot. Served as minister under Fisher and Hughes. Lost seat. Later elected to the Tasmanian House of Assembly seat of Bass in 1922 |
| | Jens Jensen (1865–1936) | National Labor | 14 November 1916 – 17 February 1917 | Previously held the Tasmanian House of Assembly seat of Wilmot. Served as minister under Fisher and Hughes. Lost seat. Later elected to the Tasmanian House of Assembly seat of Bass in 1922 |
| | Jens Jensen (1865–1936) | Nationalist | 17 February 1917 – 1919 | Previously held the Tasmanian House of Assembly seat of Wilmot. Served as minister under Fisher and Hughes. Lost seat. Later elected to the Tasmanian House of Assembly seat of Bass in 1922 |
| | Jens Jensen (1865–1936) | Independent | 1919 – 13 December 1919 | Previously held the Tasmanian House of Assembly seat of Wilmot. Served as minister under Fisher and Hughes. Lost seat. Later elected to the Tasmanian House of Assembly seat of Bass in 1922 |
| | Syd Jackson (1889–1941) | Nationalist | 13 December 1919 – 12 October 1929 | Lost seat |
| | Allan Guy (1890–1979) | Labor | 12 October 1929 – March 1931 | Previously held the Tasmanian House of Assembly seat of Bass. Served as minister under Lyons. Lost seat. Later elected to the Division of Wilmot in 1940 |
| | Allan Guy (1890–1979) | Independent | March 1931 – 7 May 1931 | Previously held the Tasmanian House of Assembly seat of Bass. Served as minister under Lyons. Lost seat. Later elected to the Division of Wilmot in 1940 |
| | Allan Guy (1890–1979) | United Australia | 7 May 1931 – 15 September 1934 | Previously held the Tasmanian House of Assembly seat of Bass. Served as minister under Lyons. Lost seat. Later elected to the Division of Wilmot in 1940 |
| | Claude Barnard (1890–1957) | Labor | 15 September 1934 – 10 December 1949 | Served as minister under Chifley. Lost seat. Later elected to the Tasmanian House of Assembly seat of Bass in 1950. Son was Lance Barnard |
| | Bruce Kekwick (1910–1982) | Liberal | 10 December 1949 – 29 May 1954 | Lost seat |
| | Lance Barnard (1919–1997) | Labor | 29 May 1954 – 2 June 1975 | Served as minister and Deputy Prime Minister under Whitlam. Resigned to become Australian Ambassador to Sweden, Norway and Finland. Father was Claude Barnard |
| | Kevin Newman (1933–1999) | Liberal | 28 June 1975 – 26 October 1984 | Served as minister under Fraser. Retired |
| | Warwick Smith (1954–) | Liberal | 1 December 1984 – 13 March 1993 | Lost seat |
| | Silvia Smith (1939–2020) | Labor | 13 March 1993 – 2 March 1996 | Lost seat. Later elected to the Tasmanian Legislative Council in 1997 |
| | Warwick Smith (1954–) | Liberal | 2 March 1996 – 3 October 1998 | Served as minister under Howard. Lost seat |
| | Michelle O'Byrne (1968–) | Labor | 3 October 1998 – 9 October 2004 | Lost seat. Later elected to the Tasmanian House of Assembly seat of Bass in 2006 |
| | Michael Ferguson (1974–) | Liberal | 9 October 2004 – 24 November 2007 | Lost seat. Later elected to the Tasmanian House of Assembly seat of Bass in 2010 |
| | Jodie Campbell (1972–) | Labor | 24 November 2007 – 19 July 2010 | Retired |
| | Geoff Lyons (1953–) | Labor | 21 August 2010 – 7 September 2013 | Lost seat |
| | Andrew Nikolic (1961–) | Liberal | 7 September 2013 – 2 July 2016 | Lost seat |
| | Ross Hart (1960–) | Labor | 2 July 2016 – 18 May 2019 | Lost seat |
| | Bridget Archer (1975–) | Liberal | 18 May 2019 – 3 May 2025 | Lost seat. Later elected to the Tasmanian House of Assembly seat of Bass in 2025 |
| | Jess Teesdale (1987–) | Labor | 3 May 2025 – present | Incumbent |

== Election results ==
2025 Australian federal election: Bass
| Party | Candidate | Votes | % | ±% |
|---|---|---|---|---|
| Labor | Jess Teesdale | 28,375 | 39.63 | +11.02 |
| Liberal | Bridget Archer | 22,511 | 31.44 | −8.29 |
| Greens | Charlene McLennan | 9,229 | 12.89 | +1.79 |
| One Nation | Jordan Potter | 4,639 | 6.48 | +1.77 |
| Independent | George Razay | 3,852 | 5.38 | +0.35 |
| Trumpet of Patriots | Ray Broomhall | 2,287 | 3.19 | +3.19 |
| Citizens | Caroline Larner | 701 | 0.98 | +0.98 |
| Total formal votes | | 71,594 | 95.94 | +1.87 |
| Informal votes | | 3,031 | 4.06 | −1.87 |
| Turnout | | 74,625 | 92.84 | +0.89 |
Two-party-preferred result
| Labor | Jess Teesdale | 41,532 | 58.01 | +9.44 |
| Liberal | Bridget Archer | 30,062 | 41.99 | −9.44 |
| Labor gain from Liberal | | Swing | +9.44 | |
