= David Storrer =

Australian politician (1854–1935)

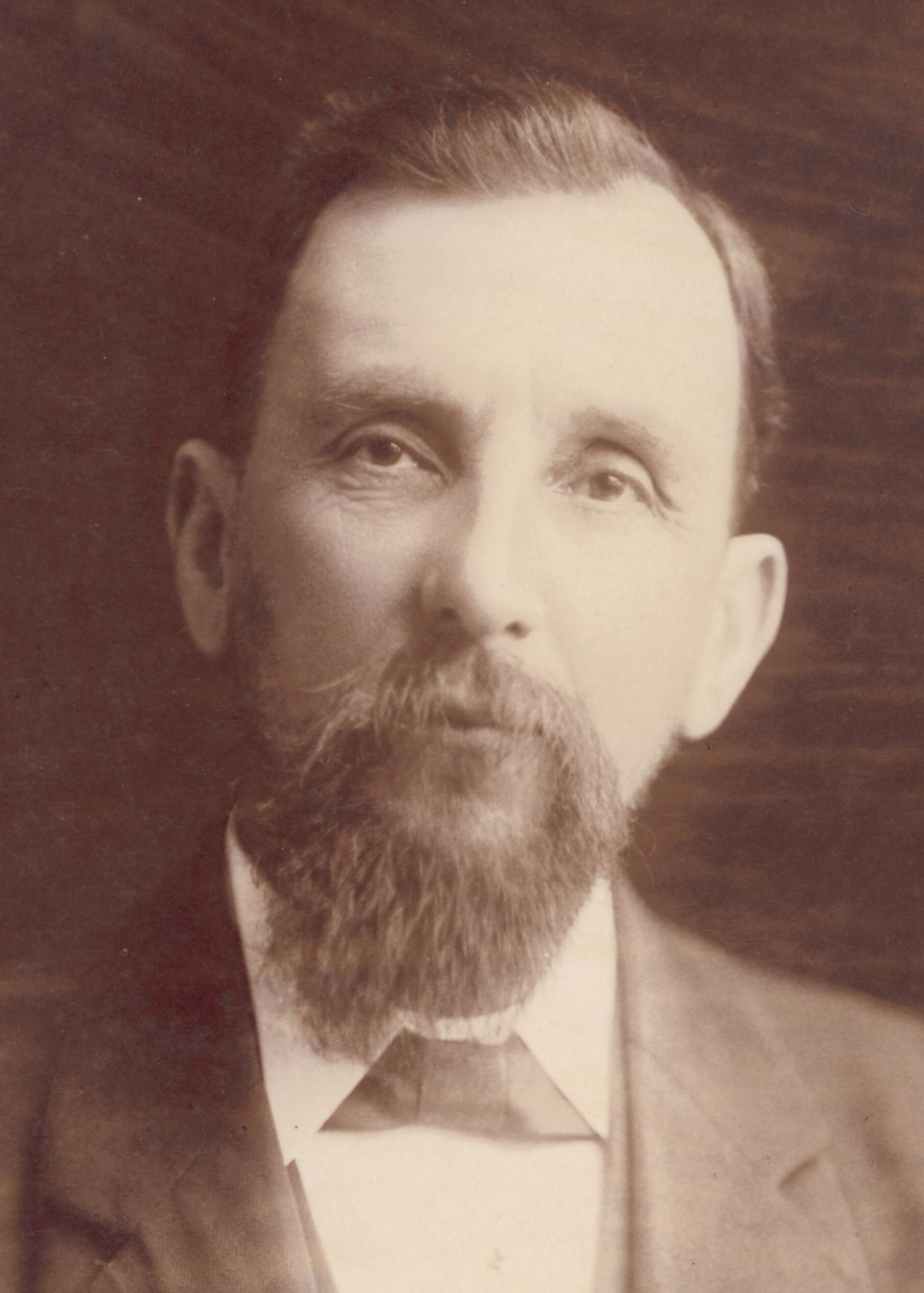

Member of the Australian Parliament for Bass
- In office 16 December 1903 – 13 April 1910
- Preceded by: New seat
- Succeeded by: Jens Jensen

Personal details
- Born: 24 November 1854 Legana, Tasmania
- Died: 13 November 1935 (aged 80) Launceston, Tasmania, Australia
- Party: Protectionist (1903–09); Independent (1909–10)
- Occupation: Cabinet maker

David Storrer (24 November 1854 – 13 November 1935) was an Australian politician.

Born in Legana, Tasmania, he was educated at Chalmers Church Grammar School before becoming a cabinet maker and furniture warehouseman. He served three separate terms as an alderman at Launceston from 1894 to 1897, 1898 to 1904 and 1913 to 1921, and was elected Mayor for 1903.

In 1902, he was elected to the Tasmanian House of Assembly as a Protectionist for the Electoral district of Launceston, but the following year he resigned to contest the Australian House of Representatives seat of Bass in the 1903 federal election. He defeated sitting Free Trade MP William Hartnoll, becoming the second Protectionist from Tasmania in the House (the other was Philip Fysh, who was a Free Trader by inclination). In 1909, when the Protectionist and Free Trade Parties merged to form the Commonwealth Liberal Party, Storrer (along with fellow Protectionists William Lyne, George Wise and John Chanter) refused to support the fusion, and sat as an independent. He contested the seat in the 1910 election, but was defeated by the Labor candidate, Jens Jensen. Storrer died in Launceston in 1935.

Parliament of Australia
Division created	Member for Bass; 1903–1910	Succeeded by Jens Jensen
