= 1975 Bass by-election =

28 June 1975
	First party	Second party
Candidate	Kevin Newman	John Macrostie
Party	Liberal	Labor
First preference vote	24,638	15,609
Percentage	57.6%	36.5%
Swing	▲11.6pp	▼17.5pp
TPP	60.3%	39.7
TPP swing	▲14.3pp	▼14.3pp
MP before election
Lance Barnard
Labor
Elected MP
Kevin Newman
Liberal

A by-election was held for the Australian House of Representatives seat of Bass on 28 June 1975. This was triggered by the resignation of Labor Party MP and former Deputy Prime Minister Lance Barnard.

The by-election was won by Liberal Party candidate Kevin Newman. Newman's victory came as something of a surprise. Barnard had held the seat since 1954 and had usually skated to reelection. However, in the by-election, Labor's primary vote plummeted by more than 17 percent, and Newman took the seat off Labor with a resounding 60 percent of the two-party vote. Newman actually won 57.6 percent of the primary vote, enough to win the seat outright.

The shock loss of Bass is widely reckoned as the beginning of the end for Gough Whitlam, whose government was dismissed from office six months later.

== Results ==
1975 Bass by-election
Party	Candidate	Votes	%	±%
Liberal	Kevin Newman	24,638	57.6	+11.6
Labor	John Macrostie	15,609	36.5	−17.5
United Tasmania	Violet Petrovsky	1,272	3.0	+3.0
Independent	Paul Kent	904	2.1	+2.1
Independent	Marcus Aussie-Stone	243	0.6	+0.6
Independent	Syd Negus	124	0.3	+0.3
Total formal votes		43,814	98.2	+0.2
Informal votes		773	1.8	−0.2
Turnout		43,563	93.2	−2.0
Two-party-preferred result
Liberal	Kevin Newman		60.3	+14.3
Labor	John Macrostie		39.7	−14.3
Liberal gain from Labor		Swing	+14.3	

== See also ==
- List of Australian federal by-elections
