= Candidates of the 1922 Australian federal election =

This article provides information on candidates who stood for the 1922 Australian federal election. The election was held on 16 December 1922.

== By-elections, appointments and defections ==
=== By-elections and appointments ===
- On 10 July 1920, Charles McGrath (Labor) was elected to succeed Edwin Kerby (Nationalist) as the member for Ballaarat, after the latter's election in 1919 was declared void.
- On 18 December 1920, George Foley (Nationalist) was elected to succeed Hugh Mahon (Labor) as the member for Kalgoorlie following the latter's expulsion from the House.
- On 16 February 1921, Edward Vardon (Nationalist) was appointed as a South Australian Senator to succeed Robert Guthrie (Nationalist).
- On 30 July 1921, James Hunter (Country) was elected to succeed Jim Page (Labor) as the member for Maranoa.
- On 3 September 1921, William Lambert (Labor) was elected to succeed T. J. Ryan (Labor) as the member for West Sydney.
- On 10 December 1921, Herbert Pratten (Nationalist) was elected to succeed Sir Joseph Cook (Nationalist) as the member for Parramatta.
- On 15 December 1921, Henry Garling (Nationalist) was appointed as a New South Wales Senator to succeed Herbert Pratten (Nationalist).
- On 18 February 1922, James Scullin (Labor) was elected to succeed Frank Tudor (Labor) as the member for Yarra.
- On 26 May 1922, John MacDonald (Labor) was appointed as a Queensland Senator to succeed John Adamson (Nationalist).

=== Defections ===
- In 1920, Labor MP William Higgs (Capricornia) was expelled from the Labor Party. After a period as an independent, he joined the Nationalist Party later that year.
- In 1920, the Australian Country Party was formed by the various state organisations. It was also joined by a number of Nationalist MPs: Llewellyn Atkinson (Wilmot), William Fleming (Robertson), Henry Gregory (Dampier), Alexander Hay (New England), Edmund Jowett (Echuca) and William McWilliams (Franklin).
- In 1922, Nationalists disaffected with Prime Minister Billy Hughes's leadership formed the Liberal Party. It was joined by Nationalists Richard Foster (Wakefield), William Watt (Balaclava), Senator James Rowell (South Australia) and Senator Edward Vardon (South Australia).
- In 1922, Country MP Alexander Hay (New England) was expelled from the party. He sat as an independent.
- In 1922, Independent MP Frederick Francis (Henty) joined the Nationalist Party.
- In 1922, Labor MP James Catts (Cook) was expelled from the party. He contested the election for the Majority Labor Party.

== Redistributions and seat changes ==
- Redistributions of electoral boundaries occurred in all states.
  - In New South Wales, the Independent-held seat of Barrier and the Nationalist-held seats of Illawarra and Nepean were abolished. Four new seats were created: Barton, Martin and Warringah were notionally Nationalist, and Reid was notionally Labor.
    - The member for Barrier, Michael Considine (Industrial Socialist Labor), contested Darling.
    - The member for Illawarra, Hector Lamond (Nationalist), contested Barton.
    - The member for Nepean, Eric Bowden (Nationalist), contested Parramatta.
    - The member for North Sydney, Sir Granville Ryrie (Nationalist), contested Warringah. (See also Victoria below.)
    - The member for Parramatta, Herbert Pratten (Nationalist), contested Martin.
  - In Victoria, the Country-held seat of Grampians was abolished.
    - The member for Bendigo, Prime Minister Billy Hughes (Nationalist), contested the New South Wales seat of North Sydney.
    - The member for Grampians, Edmund Jowett (Country), contested Bendigo.
  - In Queensland, the Nationalist-held seat of Brisbane became notionally Labor.
  - In Western Australia, the Country-held seat of Dampier was abolished. One new seat, Forrest (notionally Country), was created.
    - The member for Dampier, Henry Gregory (Country), contested Swan.
    - The member for Swan, John Prowse (Country), contested Forrest.
  - There were minimal changes in South Australia and Tasmania.
  - A new seat was created for the Northern Territory.

== Retiring Members and Senators ==
=== Nationalist ===
- Reginald Burchell MP (Fremantle, WA)
- John Livingston MP (Barker, SA)
- Arnold Wienholt MP (Moreton, Qld)
- Senator George Fairbairn (Vic)

== House of Representatives ==
Sitting members at the time of the election are shown in bold text. Successful candidates are highlighted in the relevant colour. Where there is possible confusion, an asterisk (*) is also used.

=== New South Wales ===
| Electorate | Held by | Labor candidate | Nationalist candidate | Country candidate | Other candidate(s) |
|---|---|---|---|---|---|
| Barton | Nationalist | Frederick McDonald | **Hector Lamond** | | |
| Calare | Labor | **Thomas Lavelle** | Sir Neville Howse | Henry Pigott; Selina Siggins | |
| Cook | Labor | Edward Riley | William Pritchard | | **James Catts** (MLP) |
| Cowper | Country | | John Thomson | **Earle Page** | |
| Dalley | Labor | **William Mahony** | William Simpson | | Herbert Mitchell (MLP) |
| Darling | Labor | **Arthur Blakeley** | Walter Wright | | **Michael Considine** (ISLP) |
| East Sydney | Labor | **John West** | Sir Benjamin Fuller | | |
| Eden-Monaro | Nationalist | Ulric Walsh | **Austin Chapman** | | |
| Gwydir | Labor | **Lou Cunningham** | William Ashford | Gordon Wilkins | |
| Hume | Labor | **Parker Moloney** | Fred Belbridge | Cyril James | |
| Hunter | Labor | **Matthew Charlton** | | | |
| Lang | Nationalist | George Smith | **Sir Elliot Johnson** | | Percy Evans (MLP) |
| Macquarie | Labor | **Samuel Nicholls** | Arthur Manning | | John Miller (Ind) |
| Martin | Nationalist | | **Herbert Pratten** | | |
| Newcastle | Labor | **David Watkins** | John Willings | | Arthur Gardiner (Ind Lab) |
| New England | Nationalist | Sydney Kearney | | Victor Thompson | **Alexander Hay** (Ind) |
| North Sydney | Nationalist | | **Billy Hughes** | | Albert Piddington (Const) |
| Parkes | Nationalist | Edward Cohen | **Charles Marr** | | |
| Parramatta | Nationalist | James Stone | **Eric Bowden** | | |
| Reid | Labor | Percy Coleman | Frederick Reed | | Howard Fowles (MLP) |
| Richmond | Nationalist | | **Walter Massy-Greene** | Roland Green | John Steel (Ind) |
| Riverina | Nationalist | Essell Hoad | **John Chanter** | William Bartram; William Killen*; John Lorimer | |
| Robertson | Nationalist | Alfred Roberts | Sydney Gardner | **William Fleming** | |
| South Sydney | Labor | **Edward Riley** | Robert Moore | | Vivian Deacon (MLP) |
| Warringah | Nationalist | | **Sir Granville Ryrie** | | |
| Wentworth | Nationalist | William Fitzgerald | **Walter Marks** | | Henry Morton (Ind Nat) |
| Werriwa | Labor | **Bert Lazzarini** | Henry Bate | James Newman | |
| West Sydney | Labor | **William Lambert** | | | Thomas Bryde (PLP); Arthur O'Donnell (MLP) |

=== Northern Territory ===
| Electorate | Held by | Labor candidate | Other candidate(s) |
|---|---|---|---|
| Northern Territory | None | Harold Nelson | William Byrne (Ind); Arthur Love (NTRL); George Stevens (Ind); Frederick Thompson (Ind); Walter Young (Ind) |

=== Queensland ===
| Electorate | Held by | Labor candidate | Nationalist candidate | Country candidate | Independent candidate(s) |
|---|---|---|---|---|---|
| Brisbane | Labor | Frank Burke | **Donald Cameron** | | |
| Capricornia | Labor | Frank Forde | **William Higgs** | Albert Gorrie | |
| Darling Downs | Nationalist | James MacDougall | **Littleton Groom** | | |
| Herbert | Nationalist | Maurice Hynes | **Fred Bamford** | | |
| Kennedy | Labor | **Charles McDonald** | | Robert Nowland | |
| Lilley | Nationalist | | **George Mackay** | | Alexander Costello |
| Maranoa | Country | John Durkin | | **James Hunter** | |
| Moreton | Nationalist | Horace Lee | Josiah Francis | Francis Brewer | |
| Oxley | Nationalist | James Sharpe | **James Bayley** | | |
| Wide Bay | Nationalist | Joseph Johnston | **Edward Corser** | James Heading | |

=== South Australia ===
| Electorate | Held by | Labor candidate | Nationalist candidate | Liberal candidate | Country candidate |
|---|---|---|---|---|---|
| Adelaide | Nationalist | George Edwin Yates | **Reginald Blundell** | George McLeay | |
| Angas | Labor | **Moses Gabb** | | George Ritchie | |
| Barker | Nationalist | Eric Shepherd | | Malcolm Cameron | Ronald Hunt |
| Boothby | Nationalist | Harry Kneebone | **William Story** | Jack Duncan-Hughes | |
| Grey | Nationalist | Andrew Lacey | **Alexander Poynton** | | |
| Hindmarsh | Labor | **Norman Makin** | Charles Hayter | | |
| Wakefield | Nationalist | Edward Stokes | | **Richard Foster** | Henry Queale |

=== Tasmania ===
| Electorate | Held by | Labor candidate | Nationalist candidate | Country candidate | Other candidates |
|---|---|---|---|---|---|
| Bass | Nationalist | Alfred Higgins | **Syd Jackson** | | John Hegarty (Ind Nat); King O'Malley (Ind Lab) |
| Darwin | Nationalist | | **George Bell** | Joshua Whitsitt | James Campbell (Ind) |
| Denison | Nationalist | David O'Keefe | Leopold Broinowski; Edward Mulcahy; **William Laird Smith** | | David Blanshard (Ind) |
| Franklin | Nationalist | Benjamin Watkins | Alfred Seabrook | **William McWilliams** | |
| Wilmot | Nationalist | John Palamountain | George Pullen | **Llewellyn Atkinson***; Norman Cameron; John Campbell | |

=== Victoria ===
| Electorate | Held by | Labor candidate | Nationalist candidate | Country-Liberal candidate | Other candidates |
|---|---|---|---|---|---|
| Balaclava | Nationalist | | | **William Watt** (Lib) | |
| Ballaarat | Labor | **Charles McGrath** | Russell Coldham | Sydney King (Lib) | |
| Batman | Labor | **Frank Brennan** | George Mackay | | Martin Hannah (Ind Lab) |
| Bendigo | Nationalist | Thomas Jude | Geoffry Hurry | **Edmund Jowett** (CP) | |
| Bourke | Labor | **Frank Anstey** | John March | | |
| Corangamite | Country | Richard Crouch | Allan McDonald | **William Gibson** (CP) | |
| Corio | Nationalist | Alfred Hampson | **John Lister** | | |
| Echuca | Country | | James Stewart | **William Hill** (CP) | |
| Fawkner | Nationalist | Alfred Foster | **George Maxwell** | John Murphy (Lib) | |
| Flinders | Nationalist | | **Stanley Bruce** | Stephen Thompson (Lib) | |
| Gippsland | Nationalist | James Bermingham | **George Wise** | Thomas Paterson (CP) | |
| Henty | Independent | Roy Beardsworth | James Boyd; **Frederick Francis*** | Eleanor Glencross (Lib); Henry Gullett (Lib) | |
| Indi | Country | John Minogue | Donald Mackinnon | **Robert Cook** (CP) | |
| Kooyong | Nationalist | Jean Daley | **Sir Robert Best** | John Latham (Lib) | |
| Maribyrnong | Labor | **James Fenton** | James Stephens | | |
| Melbourne | Labor | **William Maloney** | Ernest Nicholls | | |
| Melbourne Ports | Labor | **James Mathews** | Selwyn Neale | | |
| Wannon | Nationalist | John McNeill | **Arthur Rodgers** | David Gibson (CP) | |
| Wimmera | Country | | | **Percy Stewart** (CP) | Alfred Shaw (UCP) |
| Yarra | Labor | **James Scullin** | Thomas Fitzgerald | | |

=== Western Australia ===
| Electorate | Held by | Labor candidate | Nationalist candidate | Country candidate | Independent candidate(s) |
|---|---|---|---|---|---|
| Forrest | Country | | Peter Wedd | **John Prowse** | |
| Fremantle | Nationalist | John Holman | William Hedges | | William Watson |
| Kalgoorlie | Nationalist | Albert Green | **George Foley** | | |
| Perth | Nationalist | Andrew Clementson | Harry Bolton; Alfred Carson; **James Fowler**; Edward Mann* | | |
| Swan | Country | | | **Henry Gregory** | |

== Senate ==
Sitting Senators are shown in bold text. Tickets that elected at least one Senator are highlighted in the relevant colour. Successful candidates are identified by an asterisk (*).

=== New South Wales ===
Three seats were up for election. The Nationalist Party was defending three seats. Labor Senator Albert Gardiner and Nationalist Senators Charles Cox and Walter Duncan were not up for re-election.

| Labor candidates | Nationalist candidates | Country candidates | Other candidates |
|---|---|---|---|
| James Dunn; John Grant*; Allan McDougall* | **Henry Garling**; **Edward Millen***; **Josiah Thomas** | Percy Abbott; John Crapp; William Hedges | John Powell (MLP); Arthur Rae (ISLP) |

=== Queensland ===
Four seats were up for election. One of these was a short-term vacancy caused by Nationalist Senator John Adamson's death; this seat had been filled in the interim by Labor's John MacDonald. The Nationalist Party was defending four seats. Nationalist Senators Thomas Givens and Sir William Glasgow were not up for re-election.

| Labor candidates | Nationalist candidates | Country candidates | Independent candidates |
|---|---|---|---|
| Harry Bruce; Harald Jensen; **John MacDonald**; George Martens | **Thomas Crawford***; **Harry Foll***; **Matthew Reid***; William Thompson* | John Austin; William Fielding | James Petersen; Herbert Yeates |

=== South Australia ===
Three seats were up for election. The Nationalist Party was defending three seats. Nationalist Senators Benjamin Benny, John Newland and Victor Wilson were not up for re-election.

| Labor candidates | Nationalist candidates | Liberal candidates | Other candidates |
|---|---|---|---|
| Bert Hoare*; Charles McHugh*; James O'Loghlin* | Henry Chesson; **William Senior**; John Verran | Alexander McLachlan; **James Rowell**; **Edward Vardon** | Frederic Andrews (Ind Nat) |

=== Tasmania ===
Three seats were up for election. The Nationalist Party was defending three seats. Nationalist Senators George Foster, John Millen and Herbert Payne were not up for re-election.

| Labor candidates | Nationalist candidates | Country candidates |
|---|---|---|
| James Ogden* | **Thomas Bakhap***; **John Earle**; Henry Goodluck; Herbert Hays*; **John Keating**; William Williams | William Dixon |

=== Victoria ===
Three seats were up for election. The Nationalist Party was defending three seats. Nationalist Senators Harold Elliott, James Guthrie and Edward Russell were not up for re-election.

| Labor candidates | Nationalist candidates | Country-Liberal candidates | Independent candidates |
|---|---|---|---|
| Stephen Barker*; John Barnes*; Edward Findley* | **William Bolton**; **William Plain**; George Swinburne | David Andrew (CP); Charles Merrett (Lib); Andrew White (CP) | John Foran |

=== Western Australia ===
Three seats were up for election. The Nationalist Party was defending three seats. Nationalist Senators Edmund Drake-Brockman, Patrick Lynch and George Pearce were not up for re-election.

| Labor candidates | Nationalist candidates | Country candidates | Independent candidates |
|---|---|---|---|
| Charles Graham*; Ted Needham*; Charles Williams | Joseph Allen; **Richard Buzacott**; **Hugh de Largie**; **George Henderson**; Walter Kingsmill*; Emanuel Lazarus; James Rogers | William Carroll; Leonard Darlot; Archibald Sanderson | Patrick Stone |

== See also ==
- 1922 Australian federal election
- Members of the Australian House of Representatives, 1919–1922
- Members of the Australian House of Representatives, 1922–1925
- Members of the Australian Senate, 1920–1923
- Members of the Australian Senate, 1923–1926
- List of political parties in Australia
