= 1922 Australian Senate election =

- 16 December 1922

19 of the 36 seats in the Senate 19 seats needed for a majority
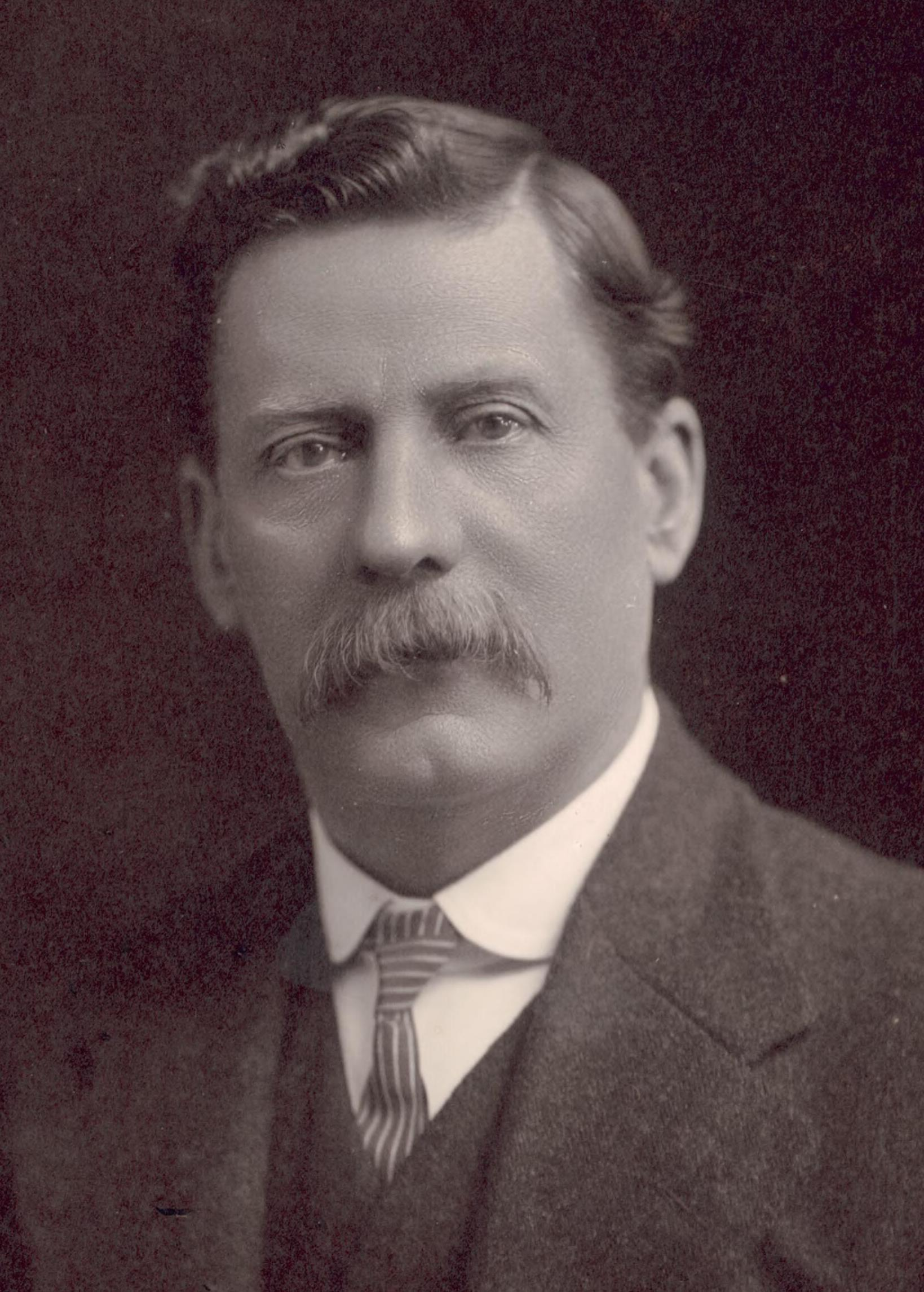

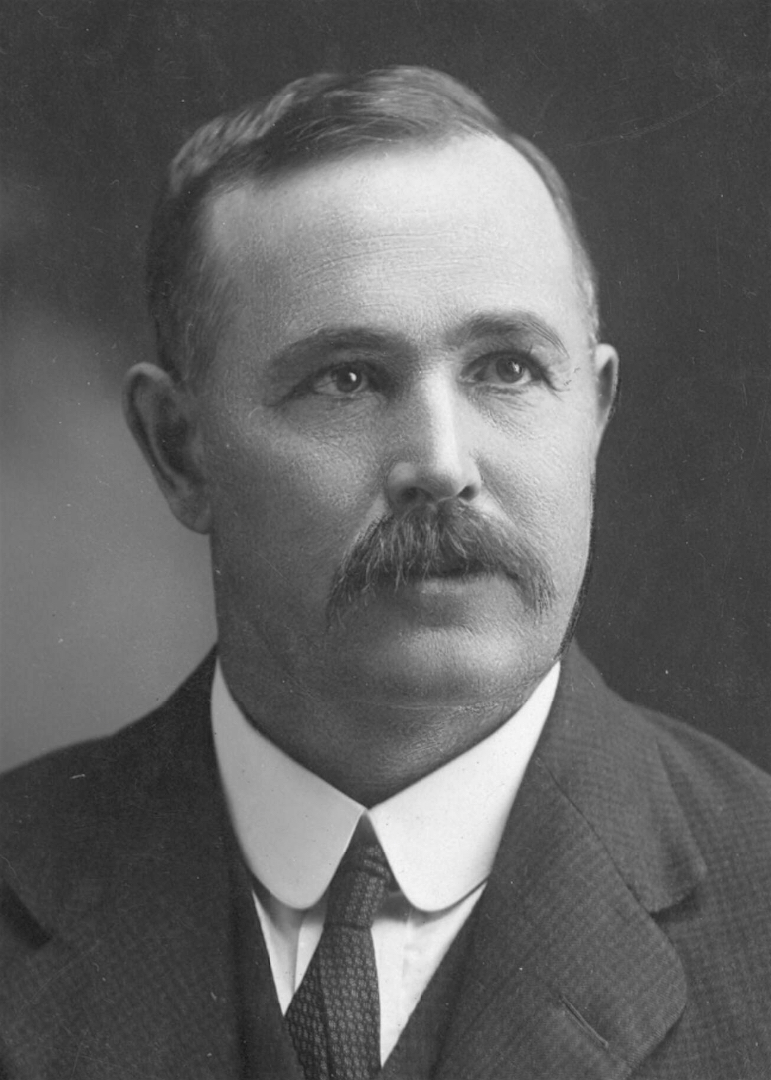
	First party	Second party
Leader	Edward Millen	Albert Gardiner
Party	Nationalist	Labor
Leader's seat	New South Wales	New South Wales
Seats before	35	1
Seats won	8	11
Seats after	24	12
Seat change	▼11	▲11
Popular vote	567,084	715,219
Percentage	36.23	45.70
Swing	▼10.17	▲2.86

The 1922 Australian Senate election was held on 16 December 1922 to elect 19 of the 36 senators in the Australian Senate as part of the 1922 federal election. Each state elected three senators to serve a six-year term beginning on 1 July 1923, except for Queensland, who elected an extra senator to fill a casual vacancy.

The election saw the Nationalist Party retain its majority in the Senate. However, Labor saw better results than the previous election, winning the popular vote and 11 of the 19 contested seats.

== Australia ==
1922 Australian federal election: Senate, National
Party	Votes	%	±	Seats			
Party	Votes	%	±	Seats won	Not up	New total	Seat change
Labor	715,219	45.70	+2.86	11	1	12	▲11
Nationalist	567,084	36.23	−10.17	8	16	24	▼11
Country	203,267	12.99	+12.99	0	0	0	Steady
Liberal Union	43,706	2.79	+2.79	0	0	0	Steady
Independents	23,447	1.50	+0.08	0	0	0	Steady
Socialist Labor	8,551	0.55	−0.02	0	0	0	Steady
Majority Labor	3,813	0.24	+0.24	0	0	0	Steady
Total	1,565,087	100.00	–	19	17	36	–
Invalid/blank votes	163,137	9.44	+0.83	–	–	–	–
Turnout	1,728,224	57.99	−13.34	–	–	–	–
Registered voters	2,980,424	–	–	–	–	–	–

== New South Wales ==
1922 Australian federal election: Senate, New South Wales
Party	Candidate	Votes	%	±%
Labor	1. Allan McDougall (elected 1); 2. James Dunn; 3. John Grant (elected 3)	246,411	44.00	+0.74
Nationalist	1. Edward Millen (re-elected 2); 2. Henry Garling (defeated); 3. Josiah Thomas (defeated)	218,862	39.08	+1.82
Country	1. Percy Abbott; 2. John Crapp; 3. William Hedges	82,443	14.72	+14.72
Socialist Labor	Arthur Rae	8,551	1.53	−0.09
Majority Labor	John Powell	3,813	0.68	+0.68
Total formal votes		560,080	90.00	−0.63
Informal votes		62,255	10.00	+0.63
Turnout		622,335	54.49	−11.99

#	Senator	Party
1	Allan McDougall	Labor
2	Edward Millen	Nationalist
3	John Grant	Labor

== Victoria ==
1922 Australian federal election: Senate, Victoria
Party	Candidate	Votes	%	±%
Labor	1. Stephen Barker (elected 1); 2. Edward Findley (elected 3); 3. John Barnes (elected 2)	221,948	48.98	+6.26
Nationalist	1. George Swinburne; 2. William Bolton (defeated); 3. William Plain (defeated)	154,861	34.17	−14.50
Country/Liberal joint ticket	1. David Andrew (CP); 2. Charles Merrett (Lib); 3. Andrew White (CP)	73,385	16.19	+16.19
Independent	John Foran	2,982	0.66	+0.66
Total formal votes		453,176	92.07	−0.16
Informal votes		39,044	7.93	+0.16
Turnout		492,220	56.23	−19.97

#	Senator	Party
1	Stephen Barker	Labor
2	John Barnes	Labor
3	Edward Findley	Labor

== Queensland ==
Following the death of Nationalist senator John Adamson in May 1922, Labor member John MacDonald was appointed by the Legislative Assembly of Queensland to fill the casual vacancy. As a result, Queensland elected four senators, with the fourth senator elected sitting the remainder of Adamson's term ending on 30 June 1926.

1922 Australian federal election: Senate, Queensland
Party	Candidate	Votes	%	±%
Labor	1. John MacDonald (defeated); 2. Harry Bruce; 3. Harald Jensen; 4. George Martens	131,880	44.01	−1.72
Nationalist	1. Thomas Crawford (re-elected 1); 2. Harry Foll (re-elected 2); 3. Matthew Reid (re-elected 3); 4. William Thompson (elected 4)	126,925	42.35	−11.92
Country	1. John Austin; 2. William Fielding	33,400	11.15	+11.15
Independent	James Petersen	10,547	3.52	+3.52
Independent	Herbert Yeates	7,468	2.49	+2.49
Total formal votes		299,673	89.25	−2.74
Informal votes		36,108	10.75	+2.74
Turnout		335,781	82.66	−2.19

#	Senator	Party
1	Thomas Crawford	Nationalist
2	Harry Foll	Nationalist
3	Matthew Reid	Nationalist
4	William Thompson	Nationalist

== Western Australia ==
1922 Australian federal election: Senate, Western Australia
Party	Candidate	Votes	%	±%
Nationalist	1. Joseph Allen; 2. James Rogers; 3. Walter Kingsmill (elected 2); 4. Richard Buzacott (defeated); 5. Emanuel Lazarus; 6. Hugh de Largie (defeated); 7. George Henderson (defeated)	30,085	42.09	−5.84
Labor	1. Ted Needham (elected 1); 2. Charles Graham (elected 3); 3. Charles Williams	29,755	41.63	+2.18
Country	1. William Carroll; 2. Archibald Sanderson; 3. Leonard Darlot	10,969	15.35	+2.73
Independent	Patrick Stone	667	0.93	+0.93
Total formal votes		71,476	90.76	−0.22
Informal votes		7,281	9.24	+0.22
Turnout		78,757	47.27	−15.85

#	Senator	Party
1	Ted Needham	Labor
2	Walter Kingsmill	Nationalist
3	Charles Graham	Labor

== South Australia ==
1922 Australian federal election: Senate, South Australia
Party	Candidate	Votes	%	±%
Labor	1. Bert Hoare (elected 1); 2. James O'Loghlin (elected 3); 3. Charles McHugh (elected 2)	65,095	48.50	+9.63
Liberal Union	1. Alexander McLachlan; 2. Edward Vardon (defeated); 3. James Rowell (defeated)	43,706	32.56	+32.56
Nationalist	1. John Verran; 2. Henry Chesson; 3. William Senior (defeated)	23,311	17.37	−38.68
Independent	Frederic Andrews	2,100	1.56	+1.56
Total formal votes		134,212	90.74	−0.20
Informal votes		13,699	9.26	+0.20
Turnout		147,911	53.22	−13.17

#	Senator	Party
1	Bert Hoare	Labor
2	Charles McHugh	Labor
3	James O'Loghlin	Labor

== Tasmania ==
1922 Australian federal election: Senate, Tasmania
Party	Candidate	Votes	%	±%
Nationalist	1. Herbert Hays (elected 2); 2. Thomas Bakhap (re-elected 3); 3. John Earle (defeated); 4. William Williams; 5. John Keating (defeated); 6. Henry Goodluck	23,270	50.08	−4.81
Labor	James Ogden (elected 1)	20,130	43.32	+2.56
Country	William Dixon	3,070	6.61	+6.61
Total formal votes		46,470	90.73	+0.41
Informal votes		4,750	9.27	−0.41
Turnout		51,220	45.63	−13.03

#	Senator	Party
1	James Ogden	Labor
2	Herbert Hays	Nationalist
3	Thomas Bakhap	Nationalist

== See also ==
- Candidates of the 1922 Australian federal election
- Results of the 1922 Australian federal election (House of Representatives)
- Members of the Australian Senate, 1923–1926
