= 1922 Australian House of Representatives election =

Australian federal election, 16 December 1922 House of Representatives << 1919–1925 >>
Enrolled voters	2,980,424				
Votes cast	1,646,863		Turnout	59.36	–12.23
Informal votes	74,349		Informal	4.51	+1.87
Summary of votes by party
Party	Primary votes	%	Swing	Seats	Change
Labor	665,145	42.30%	–0.19%	29	+ 3
Nationalist	553,920	35.23%	–9.85%	26	– 11
Country	197,513	12.56%	+3.30%	14	+ 3
Liberal	73,939	4.70%	+4.70%	5	+ 5
Majority Labor	10,303	0.66%	+0.66%	0	± 0
Ind. Socialist Labor	4,331	0.28%	+0.09%	0	± 0
Protestant Labour	3,631	0.23%	+0.23%	0	± 0
Independent	63,712	4.05%	+1.07%	1	– 1
Total	1,572,514			75	

This is a list of electoral division results for the Australian 1922 federal election.

== New South Wales ==
=== Barton ===
1922 Australian federal election: Barton
Party	Candidate	Votes	%	±%
Labor	Frederick McDonald	13,349	57.6	+16.3
Nationalist	Hector Lamond	9,828	42.4	−11.3
Total formal votes		23,177	96.2	
Informal votes		914	3.8	
Turnout		24,091	56.8	
Labor gain from Nationalist		Swing	+13.8	

=== Calare ===
1922 Australian federal election: Calare
Party	Candidate	Votes	%	±%
Labor	Thomas Lavelle	10,263	42.0	−10.2
Nationalist	Sir Neville Howse	8,449	34.6	−11.2
Country	Henry Pigott	5,278	21.6	+21.6
Country	Selina Siggins	421	1.7	+1.7
Total formal votes		24,411	94.0	
Informal votes		1,560	6.0	
Turnout		45,971	65.1	
Two-party-preferred result
Nationalist	Sir Neville Howse	13,507	55.3	+8.5
Labor	Thomas Lavelle	10,904	44.7	−8.5
Nationalist gain from Labor		Swing	+8.5	

=== Cook ===
1922 Australian federal election: Cook
Party	Candidate	Votes	%	±%
Labor	Edward Riley	14,644	65.0	+2.7
Nationalist	William Pritchard	4,749	21.1	−9.9
Majority Labor	James Catts	3,122	13.9	+13.9
Total formal votes		22,515	95.4	
Informal votes		1,085	4.6	
Turnout		23,600	57.6	
Two-party-preferred result
Labor	Edward Riley		74.9	+9.0
Nationalist	William Pritchard		25.1	−9.0
Labor hold		Swing	+9.0	

=== Cowper ===
1922 Australian federal election: Cowper
Party	Candidate	Votes	%	±%
Country	Earle Page	13,157	67.3	+14.9
Nationalist	John Thomson	6,398	32.7	+11.4
Total formal votes		19,555	94.9	
Informal votes		1,060	5.1	
Turnout		20,615	52.9	
Country hold		Swing	−4.3	

=== Dalley ===
1922 Australian federal election: Dalley
Party	Candidate	Votes	%	±%
Labor	William Mahony	16,104	66.7	+7.0
Nationalist	William Simpson	6,017	24.9	−15.4
Majority Labor	Herbert Mitchell	2,034	8.4	+8.4
Total formal votes		24,155	95.5	
Informal votes		1,125	4.5	
Turnout		25,280	59.6	
Two-party-preferred result
Labor	William Mahony		70.9	+11.2
Nationalist	William Simpson		29.1	−11.2
Labor hold		Swing	+11.2	

=== Darling ===
1922 Australian federal election: Darling
Party	Candidate	Votes	%	±%
Labor	Arthur Blakeley	8,820	45.3	−16.5
Nationalist	Walter Wright	6,329	32.5	−5.7
Industrial Labor	Michael Considine	4,331	22.2	+22.2
Total formal votes		19,480	95.2	
Informal votes		976	4.8	
Turnout		20,456	55.3	
Two-party-preferred result
Labor	Arthur Blakeley	12,682	65.1	+3.3
Nationalist	Walter Wright	6,798	34.9	−3.3
Labor hold		Swing	+3.3	

=== East Sydney ===
1922 Australian federal election: East Sydney
Party	Candidate	Votes	%	±%
Labor	John West	10,885	59.1	+1.3
Nationalist	Sir Benjamin Fuller	7,518	40.9	−1.3
Total formal votes		18,403	95.8	
Informal votes		801	4.2	
Turnout		19,204	47.3	
Labor hold		Swing	+1.3	

=== Eden-Monaro ===
1922 Australian federal election: Eden-Monaro
Party	Candidate	Votes	%	±%
Nationalist	Austin Chapman	14,892	61.1	+9.5
Labor	Ulric Walsh	9,495	38.9	−6.8
Total formal votes		24,387	94.4	
Informal votes		906	3.6	
Turnout		25,293	64.7	
Nationalist hold		Swing	+8.5	

=== Gwydir ===
1922 Australian federal election: Gwydir
Party	Candidate	Votes	%	±%
Labor	Lou Cunningham	11,056	46.3	−5.5
Country	Gordon Wilkins	8,688	36.4	+36.4
Nationalist	William Ashford	4,121	17.3	−24.3
Total formal votes		23,865	96.1	
Informal votes		972	3.9	
Turnout		24,837	64.1	
Two-party-preferred result
Labor	Lou Cunningham	11,951	50.1	−5.0
Country	Gordon Wilkins	11,914	49.9	+5.0
Labor hold		Swing	−5.0	

=== Hume ===
1922 Australian federal election: Hume
Party	Candidate	Votes	%	±%
Labor	Parker Moloney	12,494	52.9	+1.1
Nationalist	Fred Belbridge	6,518	27.6	+4.1
Country	Cyril James	4,616	19.5	−4.0
Total formal votes		23,628	95.5	
Informal votes		1,111	4.5	
Turnout		24,739	62.0	
Two-party-preferred result
Labor	Parker Moloney		54.9	+0.7
Nationalist	Fred Belbridge		45.1	−0.7
Labor hold		Swing	+0.7	

=== Hunter ===
1922 Australian federal election: Hunter
Party	Candidate	Votes	%	±%
Labor	Matthew Charlton	unopposed		
Labor hold		Swing		

=== Lang ===
1922 Australian federal election: Lang
Party	Candidate	Votes	%	±%
Nationalist	Sir Elliot Johnson	10,786	49.3	−9.3
Labor	George Smith	9,117	41.7	+0.6
Majority Labor	Percy Evans	1,974	9.0	+9.0
Total formal votes		21,877	95.7	
Informal votes		992	4.3	
Turnout		22,869	53.8	
Two-party-preferred result
Nationalist	Sir Elliot Johnson	11,911	54.4	−4.3
Labor	George Smith	9,966	45.6	+4.3
Nationalist hold		Swing	−4.3	

=== Macquarie ===
1922 Australian federal election: Macquarie
Party	Candidate	Votes	%	±%
Labor	Samuel Nicholls	10,406	48.0	−2.4
Nationalist	Arthur Manning	9,595	44.3	−5.3
Independent	John Miller	1,674	7.7	+7.7
Total formal votes		21,675	95.3	
Informal votes		1,073	4.7	
Turnout		22,748	59.2	
Two-party-preferred result
Nationalist	Arthur Manning	10,880	50.2	+0.6
Labor	Samuel Nicholls	10,795	49.8	−0.6
Nationalist gain from Labor		Swing	+0.6	

=== Martin ===
1922 Australian federal election: Martin
Party	Candidate	Votes	%	±%
Nationalist	Herbert Pratten	unopposed		
Nationalist hold		Swing		

=== Newcastle ===
1922 Australian federal election: Newcastle
Party	Candidate	Votes	%	±%
Labor	David Watkins	12,362	54.6	−45.4
Nationalist	John Willings	5,580	24.6	+24.6
Independent Labor	Arthur Gardiner	4,695	20.7	+20.7
Total formal votes		22,637	96.0	
Informal votes		932	4.0	
Turnout		23,569	55.7	
Two-party-preferred result
Labor	David Watkins		69.4	−30.6
Nationalist	John Willings		30.6	+30.6
Labor hold		Swing	−30.6	

=== New England ===
1922 Australian federal election: New England
Party	Candidate	Votes	%	±%
Country	Victor Thompson	7,726	35.6	+35.6
Labor	Sydney Kearney	7,683	35.4	−6.9
Independent	Alexander Hay	6,282	29.0	+29.0
Total formal votes		21,691	95.7	
Informal votes		985	4.3	
Turnout		22,676	57.7	
Two-party-preferred result
Country	Victor Thompson	12,695	58.5	+58.5
Labor	Sydney Kearney	8,996	41.5	−1.0
Country gain from Nationalist		Swing	+58.5	

=== North Sydney ===
1922 Australian federal election: North Sydney
Party	Candidate	Votes	%	±%
Nationalist	Billy Hughes	16,475	58.2	−11.2
Constitutionalist	Albert Piddington	11,812	41.8	+41.8
Total formal votes		28,287	97.3	
Informal votes		775	2.7	
Turnout		29,062	65.5	
Nationalist hold		Swing	−11.2	

=== Parkes ===
1922 Australian federal election: Parkes
Party	Candidate	Votes	%	±%
Nationalist	Charles Marr	12,970	61.8	+17.6
Labor	Edward Cohen	8,008	38.2	+0.1
Total formal votes		20,978	96.6	
Informal votes		737	3.4	
Turnout		21,715	50.1	
Nationalist hold		Swing	+1.7	

=== Parramatta ===
1922 Australian federal election: Parramatta
Party	Candidate	Votes	%	±%
Nationalist	Eric Bowden	12,793	65.4	+2.3
Labor	James Stone	6,776	34.6	−1.6
Total formal votes		19,569	95.9	
Informal votes		830	4.1	
Turnout		20,399	48.4	
Nationalist hold		Swing	−1.0	

=== Reid ===
1922 Australian federal election: Reid
Party	Candidate	Votes	%	±%
Labor	Percy Coleman	12,316	54.5	+4.7
Nationalist	Frederick Reed	9,057	40.1	−9.7
Majority Labor	Howard Fowles	1,226	5.4	+5.4
Total formal votes		22,599	94.9	
Informal votes		1,214	5.1	
Turnout		23,813	56.5	
Two-party-preferred result
Labor	Percy Coleman		58.6	+8.2
Nationalist	Frederick Reed		41.4	−8.2
Labor hold		Swing	+8.2	

=== Richmond ===
1922 Australian federal election: Richmond
Party	Candidate	Votes	%	±%
Country	Roland Green	9,848	45.7	+45.7
Nationalist	Walter Massy-Greene	9,660	44.8	−20.6
Independent	John Steel	2,039	9.5	+9.5
Total formal votes		21,547	96.8	
Informal votes		716	3.2	
Turnout		22,263	55.9	
Two-party-preferred result
Country	Roland Green	11,491	53.3	+53.3
Nationalist	Walter Massy-Greene	10,056	46.7	−24.0
Country gain from Nationalist		Swing	+24.0	

=== Riverina ===
1922 Australian federal election: Riverina
Party	Candidate	Votes	%	±%
Labor	Essell Hoad	8,609	41.1	−5.3
Country	William Killen	5,551	26.5	+26.5
Nationalist	John Chanter	4,342	20.7	−31.9
Country	William Bartram	1,832	8.7	+8.7
Country	John Lorimer	606	2.9	+2.9
Total formal votes		20,940	91.5	
Informal votes		1,946	8.5	
Turnout		22,886	58.3	
Two-party-preferred result
Country	William Killen	11,378	54.3	+54.3
Labor	Essell Hoad	9,562	45.7	−3.0
Country gain from Nationalist		Swing	N/A	

=== Robertson ===
1922 Australian federal election: Robertson
Party	Candidate	Votes	%	±%
Nationalist	Sydney Gardner	7,366	38.0	−17.4
Labor	Alfred Roberts	6,713	34.6	−10.0
Country	William Fleming	5,310	27.4	+27.4
Total formal votes		19,389	95.1	
Informal votes		996	4.9	
Turnout		20,385	52.3	
Two-party-preferred result
Nationalist	Sydney Gardner	11,987	61.8	+6.4
Labor	Alfred Roberts	7,411	38.2	−6.4
Nationalist hold		Swing	+6.4	

=== South Sydney ===
1922 Australian federal election: South Sydney
Party	Candidate	Votes	%	±%
Labor	Edward Riley	10,902	58.9	+2.4
Nationalist	Robert Moore	6,752	36.5	−7.0
Majority Labor	Vivian Deacon	870	4.7	+4.7
Total formal votes		18,524	94.9	
Informal votes		998	5.1	
Turnout		19,522	46.2	
Two-party-preferred result
Labor	Edward Riley		61.7	+5.2
Nationalist	Robert Moore		38.3	−5.2
Labor hold		Swing	+5.2	

=== Warringah ===
1922 Australian federal election: Warringah
Party	Candidate	Votes	%	±%
Nationalist	Sir Granville Ryrie	unopposed		
Nationalist hold		Swing		

=== Wentworth ===
1922 Australian federal election: Wentworth
Party	Candidate	Votes	%	±%
Nationalist	Walter Marks	9,843	49.7	−11.4
Labor	William Fitzgerald	6,455	32.6	−6.3
Ind. Nationalist	Henry Morton	3,502	17.7	+17.7
Total formal votes		19,800	96.2	
Informal votes		776	3.8	
Turnout		20,575	50.4	
Two-party-preferred result
Nationalist	Walter Marks	12,251	61.9	+0.8
Labor	William Fitzgerald	7,549	38.1	−0.8
Nationalist hold		Swing	+0.8	

=== Werriwa ===
1922 Australian federal election: Werriwa
Party	Candidate	Votes	%	±%
Labor	Bert Lazzarini	12,397	53.1	+1.3
Nationalist	Henry Bate	8,881	38.0	+1.4
Country	James Newman	2,085	8.9	+8.9
Total formal votes		23,363	95.0	
Informal votes		1,242	5.0	
Turnout		24,605	61.9	
Two-party-preferred result
Labor	Bert Lazzarini		53.9	−0.1
Nationalist	Henry Bate		46.1	+0.1
Labor hold		Swing	−0.1	

=== West Sydney ===
1922 Australian federal election: West Sydney
Party	Candidate	Votes	%	±%
Labor	William Lambert	13,359	73.9	−3.8
Protestant Labour	Thomas Bryde	3,631	20.1	+20.1
Majority Labor	Arthur O'Donnell	1,077	6.0	+6.0
Total formal votes		18,067	94.3	
Informal votes		1,102	5.7	
Turnout		19,169	47.7	
Two-party-preferred result
Labor	William Lambert		75.4	−2.3
Independent Labor	Thomas Bryde		24.6	+24.6
Labor hold		Swing	−2.3	

== Victoria ==
=== Balaclava ===
1922 Australian federal election: Balaclava
Party	Candidate	Votes	%	±%
Liberal	William Watt	unopposed		
Liberal gain from Nationalist		Swing		

=== Ballaarat ===
1922 Australian federal election: Ballaarat
Party	Candidate	Votes	%	±%
Labor	Charles McGrath	14,200	50.4	+1.7
Nationalist	Russell Coldham	10,098	35.8	−14.8
Liberal	Sydney King	3,878	13.8	+13.8
Total formal votes		28,176	97.7	
Informal votes		657	2.3	
Turnout		28,833	72.7	
Two-party-preferred result
Labor	Charles McGrath		51.7	+2.6
Nationalist	Russell Coldham		48.3	−2.6
Labor hold		Swing	+2.6	

=== Batman ===
1922 Australian federal election: Batman
Party	Candidate	Votes	%	±%
Labor	Frank Brennan	14,042	51.0	−1.9
Independent Labor	Martin Hannah	7,174	26.1	+26.1
Nationalist	George Mackay	6,531	22.9	−24.2
Total formal votes		27,531	96.9	
Informal votes		867	3.1	
Turnout		28,398	60.9	
Two-party-preferred result
Labor	Frank Brennan		53.3	+0.4
Independent Labor	Martin Hannah		46.7	+46.7
Labor hold		Swing	+0.4	

=== Bendigo ===
1922 Australian federal election: Bendigo
Party	Candidate	Votes	%	±%
Labor	Thomas Jude	10,854	43.1	+0.0
Nationalist	Geoffry Hurry	7,961	31.6	−10.2
Country	Edmund Jowett	6,348	25.2	+10.1
Total formal votes		25,163	96.8	
Informal votes		826	3.2	
Turnout		25,989	63.3	
Two-party-preferred result
Nationalist	Geoffry Hurry	13,016	51.7	−3.8
Labor	Thomas Jude	12,147	48.3	+3.8
Nationalist hold		Swing	−3.8	

=== Bourke ===
1922 Australian federal election: Bourke
Party	Candidate	Votes	%	±%
Labor	Frank Anstey	17,068	70.1	+11.0
Nationalist	John March	7,290	29.9	−11.0
Total formal votes		24,358	97.6	
Informal votes		588	2.4	
Turnout		24,946	53.4	
Labor hold		Swing	+11.0	

=== Corangamite ===
1922 Australian federal election: Corangamite
Party	Candidate	Votes	%	±%
Labor	Richard Crouch	10,788	44.5	+5.0
Country	William Gibson	6,908	28.5	−8.2
Nationalist	Allan McDonald	6,530	27.0	+3.2
Total formal votes		24,226	97.2	
Informal votes		688	2.8	
Turnout		24,914	62.0	
Two-party-preferred result
Country	William Gibson	13,059	53.9	−4.3
Labor	Richard Crouch	11,167	46.1	+4.3
Country hold		Swing	−4.3	

=== Corio ===
1922 Australian federal election: Corio
Party	Candidate	Votes	%	±%
Nationalist	John Lister	12,046	50.8	+5.0
Labor	Alfred Hampson	11,646	49.2	+11.0
Total formal votes		23,692	98.1	
Informal votes		463	1.9	
Turnout		24,155	57.5	
Nationalist hold		Swing	−6.9	

=== Echuca ===
1922 Australian federal election: Echuca
Party	Candidate	Votes	%	±%
Country	William Hill	13,991	70.3	+27.0
Nationalist	James Stewart	5,914	29.7	−3.4
Total formal votes		19,905	95.9	
Informal votes		854	4.1	
Turnout		20,759	52.2	
Country hold		Swing	+27.0	

=== Fawkner ===
1922 Australian federal election: Fawkner
Party	Candidate	Votes	%	±%
Nationalist	George Maxwell	12,472	52.2	−6.3
Labor	Alfred Foster	9,881	41.4	+5.3
Liberal	John Murphy	1,533	6.4	+6.4
Total formal votes		23,886	96.9	
Informal votes		766	3.1	
Turnout		24,652	55.0	
Two-party-preferred result
Nationalist	George Maxwell		58.0	−5.5
Labor	Alfred Foster		42.0	+5.5
Nationalist hold		Swing	−5.5	

=== Flinders ===
1922 Australian federal election: Flinders
Party	Candidate	Votes	%	±%
Nationalist	Stanley Bruce	10,689	55.6	+4.5
Liberal	Stephen Thompson	8,532	44.4	+44.4
Total formal votes		19,221	95.9	
Informal votes		832	4.1	
Turnout		20,053	43.6	
Nationalist hold		Swing	−15.1	

=== Gippsland ===
1922 Australian federal election: Gippsland
Party	Candidate	Votes	%	±%
Country	Thomas Paterson	9,132	39.4	−5.4
Nationalist	George Wise	7,682	33.2	−22.0
Labor	James Bermingham	6,357	27.4	+27.4
Total formal votes		23,171	96.1	
Informal votes		950	3.9	
Turnout		24,121	56.1	
Two-party-preferred result
Country	Thomas Paterson	14,563	62.9	+18.1
Nationalist	George Wise	8,608	37.1	−18.1
Country gain from Nationalist		Swing	+18.1	

=== Henty ===
1922 Australian federal election: Henty
Party	Candidate	Votes	%	±%
Nationalist	Frederick Francis	10,794	38.1	+39.4
Labor	Roy Beardsworth	5,615	19.8	−3.0
Liberal	Henry Gullett	5,082	18.0	+18.0
Liberal	Eleanor Glencross	3,551	12.5	+12.5
Nationalist	James Boyd	3,269	11.5	+11.5
Total formal votes		28,311	94.8	
Informal votes		1,545	5.2	
Turnout		29,856	63.0	
Two-party-preferred result
Nationalist	Frederick Francis	15,811	55.8	+8.7
Liberal	Henry Gullett	12,500	44.2	+44.2
Nationalist gain from Independent		Swing	+8.7	

=== Indi ===
1922 Australian federal election: Indi
Party	Candidate	Votes	%	±%
Country	Robert Cook	8,723	39.3	+9.6
Labor	John Minogue	7,768	35.0	+1.9
Nationalist	Donald Mackinnon	5,695	25.7	−11.5
Total formal votes		22,186	96.8	
Informal votes		705	3.2	
Turnout		22,891	58.8	
Two-party-preferred result
Country	Robert Cook	14,027	63.2	−0.8
Labor	John Minogue	8,159	36.8	+0.8
Country hold		Swing	−0.8	

=== Kooyong ===
1922 Australian federal election: Kooyong
Party	Candidate	Votes	%	±%
Nationalist	Sir Robert Best	13,459	47.4	−15.1
Liberal	John Latham	9,591	33.8	+33.8
Labor	Jean Daley	5,341	18.8	+0.0
Total formal votes		28,391	97.8	
Informal votes		629	2.2	
Turnout		29,020	61.9	
Two-party-preferred result
Liberal	John Latham	14,360	50.6	+50.6
Nationalist	Sir Robert Best	14,031	49.4	−14.9
Liberal gain from Nationalist		Swing	+14.9	

=== Maribyrnong ===
1922 Australian federal election: Maribyrnong
Party	Candidate	Votes	%	±%
Labor	James Fenton	17,153	63.2	+9.7
Nationalist	James Stephens	9,976	36.8	−9.7
Total formal votes		27,129	97.7	
Informal votes		636	2.3	
Turnout		27,765	62.0	
Labor hold		Swing	+9.7	

=== Melbourne ===
1922 Australian federal election: Melbourne
Party	Candidate	Votes	%	±%
Labor	William Maloney	16,991	77.2	+11.4
Nationalist	Ernest Nicholls	5,022	22.8	−11.4
Total formal votes		22,013	96.3	
Informal votes		837	3.7	
Turnout		22,850	49.7	
Labor hold		Swing	+11.4	

=== Melbourne Ports ===
1922 Australian federal election: Melbourne Ports
Party	Candidate	Votes	%	±%
Labor	James Mathews	17,628	73.1	−26.9
Nationalist	Selwyn Neale	6,485	26.9	+26.9
Total formal votes		24,113	97.0	
Informal votes		745	3.0	
Turnout		24,858	54.1	
Labor hold		Swing	−26.9	

=== Wannon ===
1922 Australian federal election: Wannon
Party	Candidate	Votes	%	±%
Labor	John McNeill	10,795	41.1	−4.1
Nationalist	Arthur Rodgers	8,841	33.7	−18.3
Country	David Gibson	6,625	25.2	+22.4
Total formal votes		26,261	96.8	
Informal votes		872	3.2	
Turnout		27,133	67.5	
Two-party-preferred result
Labor	John McNeill	13,334	50.8	+4.9
Nationalist	Arthur Rodgers	12,927	49.2	−4.9
Labor gain from Nationalist		Swing	+4.9	

=== Wimmera ===
1922 Australian federal election: Wimmera
Party	Candidate	Votes	%	±%
Country	Percy Stewart	13,614	71.2	+11.7
United Country	Alfred Shaw	5,503	28.8	+28.8
Total formal votes		19,117	96.2	
Informal votes		765	3.8	
Turnout		19,882	46.9	
Country hold		Swing	+11.7	

=== Yarra ===
1922 Australian federal election: Yarra
Party	Candidate	Votes	%	±%
Labor	James Scullin	17,897	78.0	+8.4
Nationalist	Thomas Fitzgerald	5,042	22.0	−8.4
Total formal votes		22,939	96.4	
Informal votes		864	3.6	
Turnout		23,803	51.2	
Labor hold		Swing	+8.4	

== Queensland ==
=== Brisbane ===
1922 Australian federal election: Brisbane
Party	Candidate	Votes	%	±%
Nationalist	Donald Cameron	16,417	52.0	+3.6
Labor	Frank Burke	15,183	48.0	−3.6
Total formal votes		31,600	96.1	
Informal votes		1,285	3.9	
Turnout		32,885	80.7	
Nationalist gain from Labor		Swing	+2.5	

=== Capricornia ===
1922 Australian federal election: Capricornia
Party	Candidate	Votes	%	±%
Labor	Frank Forde	19,904	51.9	+0.5
Nationalist	William Higgs	16,079	41.9	−6.7
Country	Albert Gorrie	2,362	6.2	+6.2
Total formal votes		38,345	96.5	
Informal votes		1,403	3.5	
Turnout		39,748	88.1	
Two-party-preferred result
Labor	Frank Forde		52.5	+1.1
Nationalist	William Higgs		47.5	−1.1
Labor hold		Swing	+1.1	

=== Darling Downs ===
1922 Australian federal election: Darling Downs
Party	Candidate	Votes	%	±%
Nationalist	Littleton Groom	19,592	58.6	−0.9
Labor	James MacDougall	13,857	41.4	+0.9
Total formal votes		33,449	96.8	
Informal votes		1,092	3.2	
Turnout		34,541	85.2	
Nationalist hold		Swing	−0.9	

=== Herbert ===
1922 Australian federal election: Herbert
Party	Candidate	Votes	%	±%
Nationalist	Fred Bamford	17,396	51.7	+0.9
Labor	Maurice Hynes	16,259	48.3	+1.8
Total formal votes		33,655	93.3	
Informal votes		2,435	6.7	
Turnout		36,090	83.4	
Nationalist hold		Swing	−0.5	

=== Kennedy ===
1922 Australian federal election: Kennedy
Party	Candidate	Votes	%	±%
Labor	Charles McDonald	14,824	61.6	+0.8
Country	Robert Nowland	9,257	38.4	+37.0
Total formal votes		24,081	94.8	
Informal votes		1,333	5.2	
Turnout		25,414	74.8	
Labor hold		Swing	+0.7	

=== Lilley ===
1922 Australian federal election: Lilley
Party	Candidate	Votes	%	±%
Nationalist	George Mackay	19,842	65.2	+3.2
Independent	Alexander Costello	10,576	34.8	+34.8
Total formal votes		30,418	93.2	
Informal votes		2,218	6.8	
Turnout		32,636	80.2	
Nationalist hold		Swing	+3.2	

=== Maranoa ===
1922 Australian federal election: Maranoa
Party	Candidate	Votes	%	±%
Country	James Hunter	13,207	54.4	+11.9
Labor	John Durkin	11,086	45.6	−5.5
Total formal votes		24,293	96.2	
Informal votes		951	3.8	
Turnout		25,244	76.7	
Country hold		Swing	+6.1	

=== Moreton ===
1922 Australian federal election: Moreton
Party	Candidate	Votes	%	±%
Nationalist	Josiah Francis	14,762	44.5	−12.0
Labor	Horace Lee	12,676	38.2	−5.3
Country	Francis Brewer	5,714	17.2	+17.2
Total formal votes		33,152	94.7	
Informal votes		1,852	5.3	
Turnout		35,004	85.3	
Two-party-preferred result
Nationalist	Josiah Francis	19,730	59.5	+3.0
Labor	Horace Lee	13,422	40.5	−3.0
Nationalist hold		Swing	+3.0	

=== Oxley ===
1922 Australian federal election: Oxley
Party	Candidate	Votes	%	±%
Nationalist	James Bayley	19,552	53.3	−0.5
Labor	James Sharpe	17,146	46.7	+0.5
Total formal votes		36,698	95.8	
Informal votes		1,615	4.2	
Turnout		38,313	84.6	
Nationalist hold		Swing	−0.5	

=== Wide Bay ===
1922 Australian federal election: Wide Bay
Party	Candidate	Votes	%	±%
Nationalist	Edward Corser	13,069	38.4	−20.8
Labor	Joseph Johnston	11,580	34.0	−6.8
Country	James Heading	9,427	27.7	+27.7
Total formal votes		34,076	94.9	
Informal votes		1,830	5.1	
Turnout		35,906	84.1	
Two-party-preferred result
Nationalist	Edward Corser	20,633	60.5	+1.3
Labor	Joseph Johnston	13,443	39.5	−1.3
Nationalist hold		Swing	+1.3	

== South Australia ==
=== Adelaide ===
1922 Australian federal election: Adelaide
Party	Candidate	Votes	%	±%
Labor	George Edwin Yates	10,714	51.7	+6.8
Liberal Union	George McLeay	5,872	28.4	+28.4
National Party	Reginald Blundell	4,123	19.9	−33.8
Total formal votes		20,709	92.7	
Informal votes		1,629	7.3	
Turnout		22,338	63.4	
Two-party-preferred result
Labor	George Edwin Yates		53.6	+8.0
Liberal Union	George McLeay		46.4	+46.4
Labor gain from National Party		Swing	+8.0	

=== Angas ===
1922 Australian federal election: Angas
Party	Candidate	Votes	%	±%
Labor	Moses Gabb	11,192	58.0	+8.2
Liberal Union	George Ritchie	8,090	42.0	+42.0
Total formal votes		19,282	95.6	
Informal votes		888	4.4	
Turnout		20,170	51.0	
Labor hold		Swing	+7.8	

=== Barker ===
1922 Australian federal election: Barker
Party	Candidate	Votes	%	±%
Labor	Eric Shepherd	8,066	43.1	+9.4
Liberal Union	Malcolm Cameron	7,861	42.0	+42.0
Country	Ronald Hunt	2,791	14.9	+14.9
Total formal votes		18,718	92.6	
Informal votes		1,491	7.4	
Turnout		20,209	50.2	
Two-party-preferred result
Liberal Union	Malcolm Cameron	9,789	52.3	+52.3
Labor	Eric Shepherd	8,929	46.7	+11.0
Liberal Union gain from National Party		Swing	−11.0	

=== Boothby ===
1922 Australian federal election: Boothby
Party	Candidate	Votes	%	±%
Liberal Union	Jack Duncan-Hughes	7,793	39.5	+39.5
Labor	Harry Kneebone	7,775	39.4	+5.3
National Party	William Story	4,179	21.2	−44.7
Total formal votes		19,747	93.3	
Informal votes		1,411	6.7	
Turnout		21,158	53.4	
Two-party-preferred result
Liberal Union	Jack Duncan-Hughes	10,804	54.7	+54.7
Labor	Harry Kneebone	8,943	45.3	+11.2
Liberal Union gain from National Party		Swing	−11.2	

=== Grey ===
1922 Australian federal election: Grey
Party	Candidate	Votes	%	±%
Labor	Andrew Lacey	9,778	53.7	+5.5
National Party	Alexander Poynton	8,425	46.3	−5.5
Total formal votes		18,203	92.9	
Informal votes		1,385	7.1	
Turnout		19,588	57.3	
Labor gain from National Party		Swing	+5.5	

=== Hindmarsh ===
1922 Australian federal election: Hindmarsh
Party	Candidate	Votes	%	±%
Labor	Norman Makin	15,111	68.6	+14.6
National Party	Charles Hayter	6,925	31.4	−14.6
Total formal votes		22,036	94.0	
Informal votes		1,409	6.0	
Turnout		23,445	54.1	
Labor hold		Swing	+14.6	

=== Wakefield ===
1922 Australian federal election: Wakefield
Party	Candidate	Votes	%	±%
Liberal Union	Richard Foster	8,288	42.9	+42.9
Labor	Edward Stokes	7,076	36.7	−2.2
Country	Henry Queale	3,941	20.4	+9.5
Total formal votes		19,305	91.9	
Informal votes		1,698	8.1	
Turnout		21,003	54.4	
Two-party-preferred result
Liberal Union	Richard Foster	10,680	55.3	+55.3
Labor	Edward Stokes	8,625	44.7	+1.9
Liberal Union gain from National Party		Swing	−1.9	

== Western Australia ==
=== Forrest ===
1922 Australian federal election: Forrest
Party	Candidate	Votes	%	±%
Country	John Prowse	10,007	79.5	+33.1
Nationalist	Peter Wedd	2,576	20.5	+0.3
Total formal votes		12,583	90.6	
Informal votes		1,303	9.4	
Turnout		13,886	40.9	
Country hold		Swing	+14.9	

=== Fremantle ===
1922 Australian federal election: Fremantle
Party	Candidate	Votes	%	±%
Independent	William Watson	7,420	40.6	+40.6
Labor	John Holman	7,290	39.9	−4.4
Nationalist	William Hedges	3,550	19.4	−34.1
Total formal votes		18,260	96.1	
Informal votes		742	3.9	
Turnout		19,002	54.3	
Two-party-preferred result
Independent	William Watson	10,381	56.9	+56.9
Labor	John Holman	7,879	43.1	−0.6
Independent gain from Nationalist		Swing	+56.9	

=== Kalgoorlie ===
1922 Australian federal election: Kalgoorlie
Party	Candidate	Votes	%	±%
Labor	Albert Green	9,889	57.4	+8.9
Nationalist	George Foley	7,331	42.6	+9.9
Total formal votes		17,220	94.9	
Informal votes		917	5.1	
Turnout		18,137	58.4	
Labor gain from Nationalist		Swing	+7.1	

=== Perth ===
1922 Australian federal election: Perth
Party	Candidate	Votes	%	±%
Labor	Andrew Clementson	4,951	34.2	−0.3
Nationalist	Edward Mann	3,073	21.3	+1.0
Nationalist	James Fowler	2,583	17.9	+1.0
Nationalist	Alfred Carson	2,125	14.7	+1.0
Nationalist	Harry Bolton	1,728	12.0	+12.0
Total formal votes		14,460	92.1	
Informal votes		1,246	7.9	
Turnout		15,706	46.8	
Two-party-preferred result
Nationalist	Edward Mann	8,513	58.9	−2.9
Labor	Andrew Clementson	5,947	41.1	+2.9
Nationalist hold		Swing	−2.9	

=== Swan ===
1922 Australian federal election: Swan
Party	Candidate	Votes	%	±%
Country	Henry Gregory	unopposed		
Country hold		Swing		

== Tasmania ==
=== Bass ===
1922 Australian federal election: Bass
Party	Candidate	Votes	%	±%
Nationalist	Syd Jackson	4,819	50.2	+2.0
Labor	Alfred Higgins	3,359	35.0	+1.3
Independent Labor	King O'Malley	1,085	11.3	+11.3
Ind. Nationalist	John Hegarty	337	3.5	+3.5
Total formal votes		9,600	95.3	
Informal votes		478	4.7	
Turnout		10,078	44.9	
Two-party-preferred result
Nationalist	Syd Jackson		53.6	−3.7
Labor	Alfred Higgins		46.4	+3.7
Nationalist hold		Swing	−3.7	

=== Darwin ===
1922 Australian federal election: Darwin
Party	Candidate	Votes	%	±%
Nationalist	George Bell	4,533	45.1	−1.3
Country	Joshua Whitsitt	4,051	40.3	+40.3
Independent	James Campbell	1,473	14.6	+14.6
Total formal votes		10,057	96.0	
Informal votes		424	4.0	
Turnout		10,481	46.5	
Two-party-preferred result
Country	Joshua Whitsitt	5,069	50.4	+50.4
Nationalist	George Bell	4,988	49.6	−2.5
Country gain from Nationalist		Swing	+2.5	

=== Denison ===
1922 Australian federal election: Denison
Party	Candidate	Votes	%	±%
Labor	David O'Keefe	5,234	46.5	+0.4
Nationalist	Edward Mulcahy	2,295	20.4	−1.9
Nationalist	William Laird Smith	1,881	16.7	+16.7
Nationalist	Leopold Broinowski	1,667	14.8	+14.8
Independent	David Blanchard	170	1.5	+1.5
Total formal votes		11,247	90.7	
Informal votes		1,158	9.3	
Turnout		12,405	51.5	
Two-party-preferred result
Labor	David O'Keefe	5,669	50.4	+4.3
Nationalist	Edward Mulcahy	5,578	49.6	−4.3
Labor gain from Nationalist		Swing	+4.3	

=== Franklin ===
1922 Australian federal election: Franklin
Party	Candidate	Votes	%	±%
Labor	Benjamin Watkins	3,364	37.6	+37.6
Nationalist	Alfred Seabrook	2,829	31.6	+31.6
Country	William McWilliams	2,762	30.8	+30.8
Total formal votes		8,955	95.8	
Informal votes		396	4.2	
Turnout		9,351	43.8	
Two-party-preferred result
Nationalist	Alfred Seabrook	5,040	56.3	−5.8
Labor	Benjamin Watkins	3,915	43.7	+43.7
Nationalist hold		Swing	−5.8	

=== Wilmot ===
1922 Australian federal election: Wilmot
Party	Candidate	Votes	%	±%
Labor	John Palamountain	2,596	32.2	+32.2
Nationalist	George Pullen	1,926	23.9	+29.4
Country	Llewellyn Atkinson	1,826	22.7	+18.2
Country	Norman Cameron	1,407	17.5	+17.5
Country	John Campbell	302	3.7	+3.7
Total formal votes		8,057	90.5	
Informal votes		850	9.5	
Turnout		8,907	40.8	
Two-party-preferred result
Country	Llewellyn Atkinson	4,930	61.2	+61.2
Labor	John Palamountain	3,127	38.8	+38.8
Country gain from Nationalist		Swing	+61.2	

== Northern Territory ==
=== Northern Territory ===
1922 Australian federal election: Northern Territory
Party	Candidate	Votes	%	±%
Labor	Harold Nelson	452	37.4	+37.4
NT Representation League	Arthur Love	362	30.0	+30.0
Independent	Walter Young	218	18.1	+18.1
Independent	George Stevens	127	10.5	+10.5
Independent	William Byrne	43	3.6	+3.6
Independent	Frederick Thompson	5	0.4	+0.4
Total formal votes		1,207	96.9	
Informal votes		38	3.1	
Turnout		1,245	90.5	
Two-party-preferred result
Labor	Harold Nelson	608	50.4	+50.4
NT Representation League	Arthur Love	599	49.6	+49.6
Labor win		(new seat)		

== See also ==
- Candidates of the 1922 Australian federal election
- Members of the Australian House of Representatives, 1922–1925
- Results of the 1922 Australian federal election (Senate)
