= Electoral results for the district of De Grey =

Western Australian district election results

This is a list of electoral results for the Electoral district of De Grey in Western Australian colonial elections.

== Members for De Grey ==
Member	Party	Term
Alexander Richardson	Ministerial	1890–1897
E.T. Hooley	Ministerial	1897–1900
Leonard Darlot	Ministerial	1900–1901

== Election results ==
=== Elections in the 1900s ===
1900 De Grey colonial by-election
Party	Candidate	Votes	%	±%
Ministerialist	Leonard Darlot	unopposed		
Ministerialist hold		Swing		

=== Elections in the 1890s ===
1897 Western Australian colonial election: De Grey
Party	Candidate	Votes	%	±%
Ministerialist	Edward Hooley	unopposed		
Ministerialist hold		Swing		

1894 Western Australian colonial election: De Grey
Party	Candidate	Votes	%	±%
None	Alexander Richardson	unopposed		

1890 Western Australian colonial election: De Grey
Party	Candidate	Votes	%	±%
None	Alexander Richardson	unopposed		
