= 1922 Australian Labor Party leadership election =

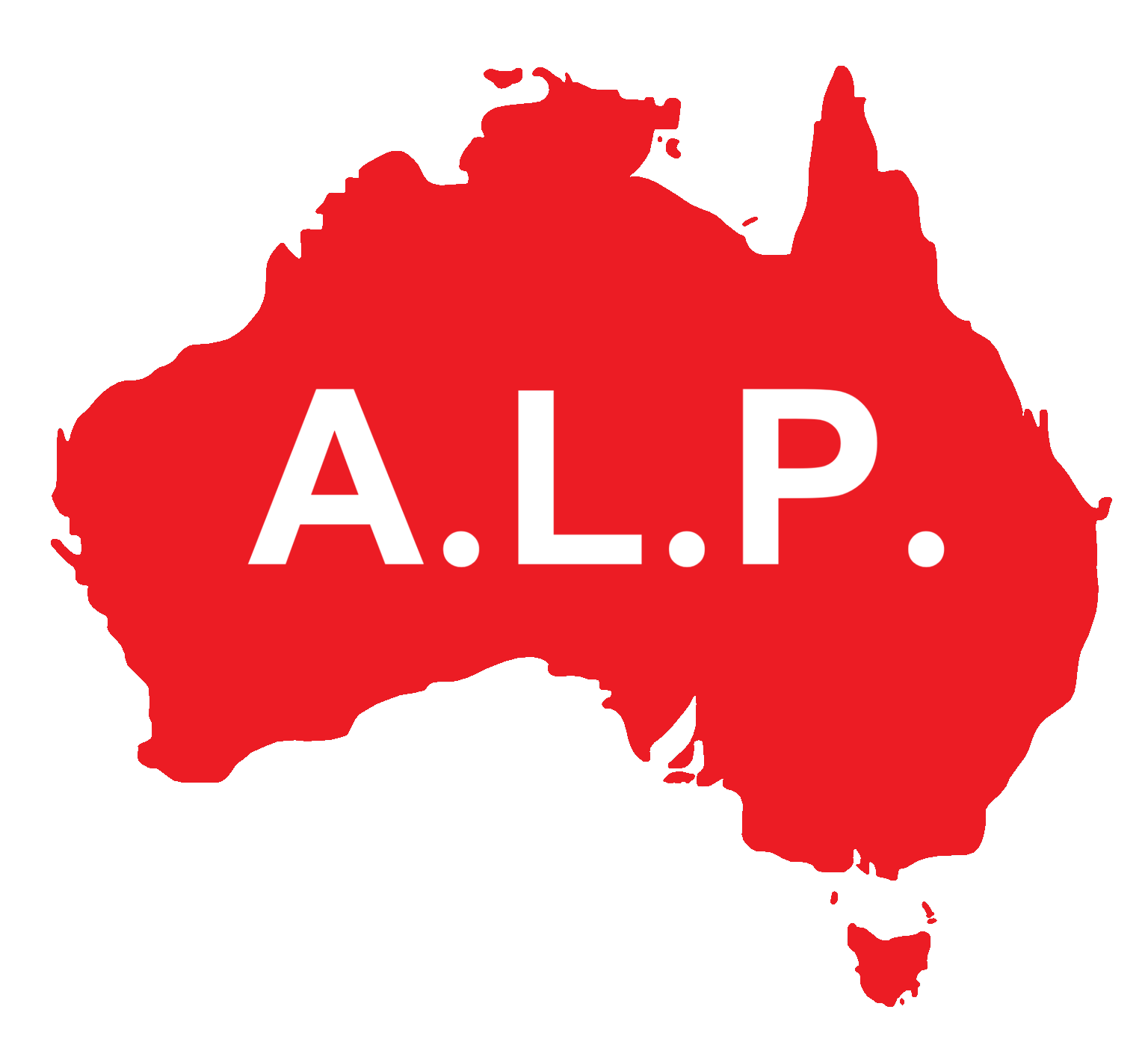
- 16 May 1922
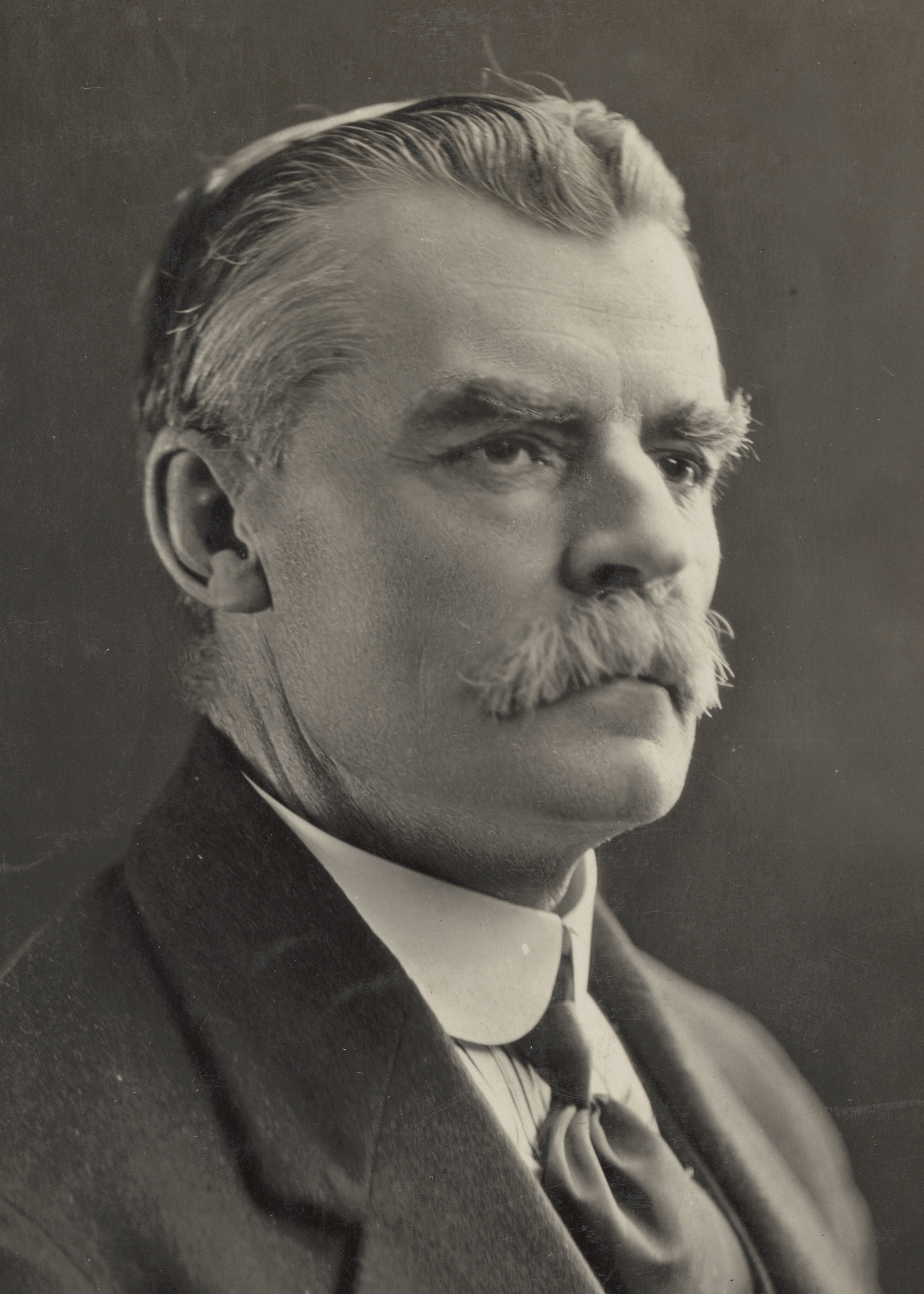

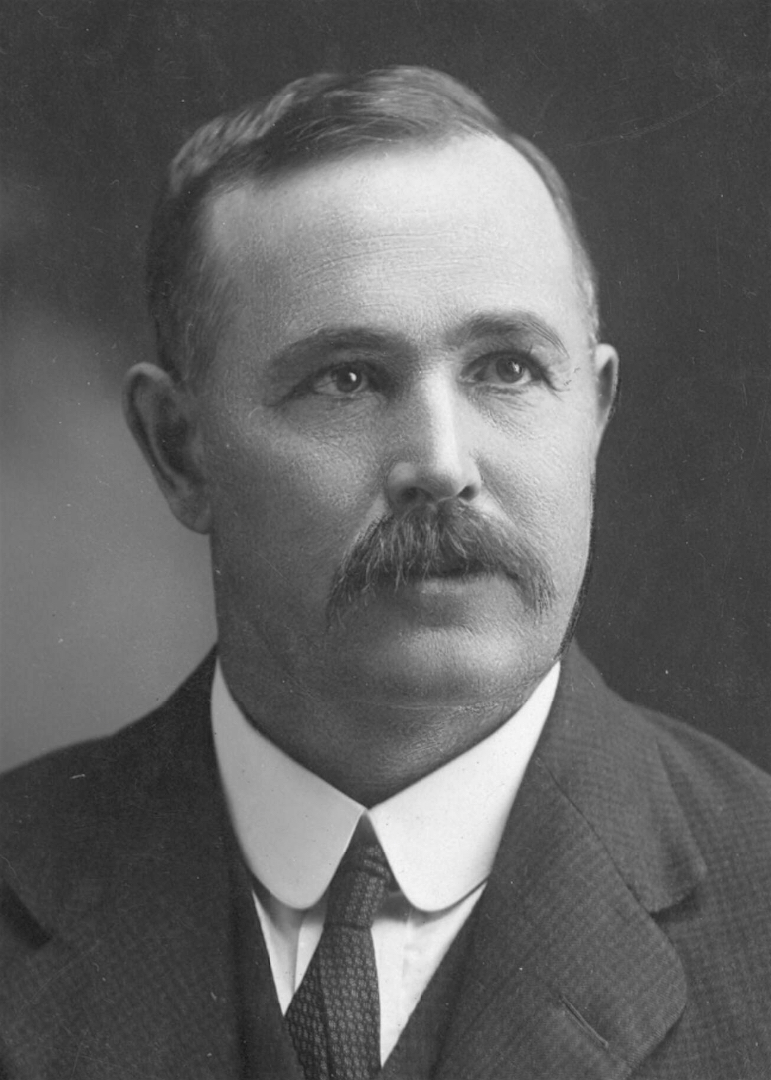
Candidate	Matthew Charlton	Albert Gardiner
Caucus vote	22 (91.7%)	2 (8.3%)
Leader before election
Frank Tudor†
Elected Leader
Matthew Charlton

The Australian Labor Party held a leadership election on 16 May 1922, following the death of Frank Tudor. The party elected Matthew Charlton as its new leader.

== Background ==
Tudor died on 10 January 1922, after a long period of ill health. He had been the party's leader since November 1916, following the expulsion of Billy Hughes and his supporters during the split over conscription. His deputy and assumed successor, T. J. Ryan, had died a few months earlier on 1 August 1921. Matthew Charlton, who had already acted as deputy leader on several occasions, was formally chosen as Ryan's replacement on 29 September. He served as acting leader on a number of occasions when Tudor's health forced his absence.

On 25 January, following Tudor's state funeral, Charlton was chosen unanimously as leader of the Labor Party in the House of Representatives. He thus became Leader of the Opposition. The overall leadership of the party was left vacant until parliament resumed, but Charlton was the de facto party leader. On 16 May, the party formally elected Charlton as its leader. Albert Gardiner, the party's sole senator, was the only other candidate, attracting only 2 votes to Charlton's 22. He was subsequently elected unopposed as the party's deputy leader, while Frank Anstey was chosen as the deputy leader in the House of Representatives. James Scullin was also nominated for the latter post, despite only having recently returned to parliament, but he declined the nomination.

== Results ==
The following table gives the ballot results:

Name	Votes	Percentage
Matthew Charlton	22	91.66
Albert Gardiner	2	8.34

== See also ==
- 1922 Australian federal election
- Other Labor leadership elections following the death of the incumbent:
  - 1945 Australian Labor Party leadership election
  - 1951 Australian Labor Party leadership election
