= Henry Garling =

Australian politician (1870–1942)

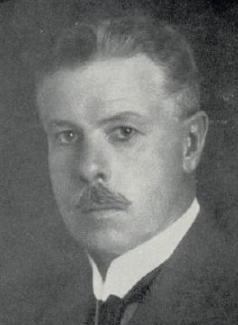

Senator for New South Wales
- In office 15 December 1921 – 15 December 1922
- Preceded by: Herbert Pratten
- Succeeded by: Allan McDougall

Personal details
- Born: 7 June 1870 Camden, New South Wales, Australia
- Died: 19 November 1942 (aged 72) Double Bay, New South Wales, Australia
- Party: Nationalist (to 1923)
- Spouse: Violette Harper (m. 1907)
- Occupation: Insurance agent Bank manager Solicitor

Henry Chester-Master Garling (7 June 1870 – 19 November 1942) was an Australian politician and lawyer. He was a Senator for New South Wales from 1921 to 1922, representing the Nationalist Party. He was appointed to the Senate to fill a casual vacancy and was an unsuccessful candidate at the 1919 and 1922 federal elections, as well as the 1920 New South Wales state election.

== Early life ==
Garling was born on 7 June 1870 in Camden, New South Wales. He was the son of Mary Catherine (née Gardiner) and Clarence William Henry Garling. His father was a bank manager.

After leaving school, Garling joined merchant firm Henry Bull & Co. as a clerk. He later worked for insurance agencies Michael Metcalfe and Co. and South British Insurance, before joining the Bank of New South Wales. He worked for the bank for thirteen years, managing various branches in country New South Wales and becoming an inspector. Garling subsequently studied law and was admitted as a solicitor in 1905. He worked in Cessnock and was said to have had the first legal practice in that town. He later settled in Young and went into partnership with James Gordon Long in the firm of Gordon & Garling. Their business later expanded into Sydney and was known as Gordon Garling Blackmore and Gordon Garling Moffitt (GGM).

== Politics ==
Garling served as secretary of the Young branch of the Liberal Association and after moving to Sydney was an alderman on the Woollahra Council from 1921 to 1922. He first stood for parliament at the 1919 federal election, running unsuccessfully in third position on the Nationalist Party ticket in New South Wales. He was also an unsuccessful candidate at the 1920 New South Wales state election, standing on the Nationalist ticket in the multi-member seat of Western Suburbs.

On 15 December 1921, Garling was elected by the parliament of New South Wales to fill the casual vacancy caused by the resignation of Herbert Pratten. He was the endorsed candidate of the state Nationalist Party, narrowly defeating Australian Labor Party (ALP) nominee John Grant following the elimination of a Progressive Party candidate. Garling won Nationalist preselection for the 1922 federal election, but was defeated for re-election amid a controversy over his positioning on the Senate ticket. He had initially expected that the Nationalist candidates would be ordered alphabetically, with himself as lead candidate, but was instead placed behind Edward Millen, who was re-elected. Under the constitutional provisions at the time, his term ended on the election date of 15 December 1922 rather than at the end of Pratten's original term on 30 June 1923.

Despite parliament being prorogued for most of his term, Garling was an energetic contributor to Senate debate, speaking on a wide range of topics including parliamentary procedure, defence, immigration and land policy. He had served on the council of the New Settlers' League of Australia and was strongly supportive of assisted passage schemes for British migrants, including the Million Farms scheme. He supported expansion of the Senate committee system to ensure greater scrutiny of legislation.

Following Millen's death in September 1923, Garling believed himself entitled to fill the casual vacancy but was refused endorsement by the Nationalist state council in favour of Walter Massy-Greene. He publicly resigned his life membership of the Nationalist Association in 1923, stating that he "had no course left open but to resign from a party where a sense of decency and fairplay is so little recognised as an attribute of machine politics that honorable understandings possess even less value than the proverbial scrap of paper".

== Personal life ==
In 1907, Garling married Violette Harper, with whom he had four children. He died on 19 November 1942 in Double Bay.

Garling's letters were frequently published in the Sydney Morning Herald. In 1936 he visited Japan, Manchoukuo, the Soviet Union, and Europe, on his return giving a series of lectures on his experiences.
