= Charles Graham (Western Australian politician) =

Australian politician

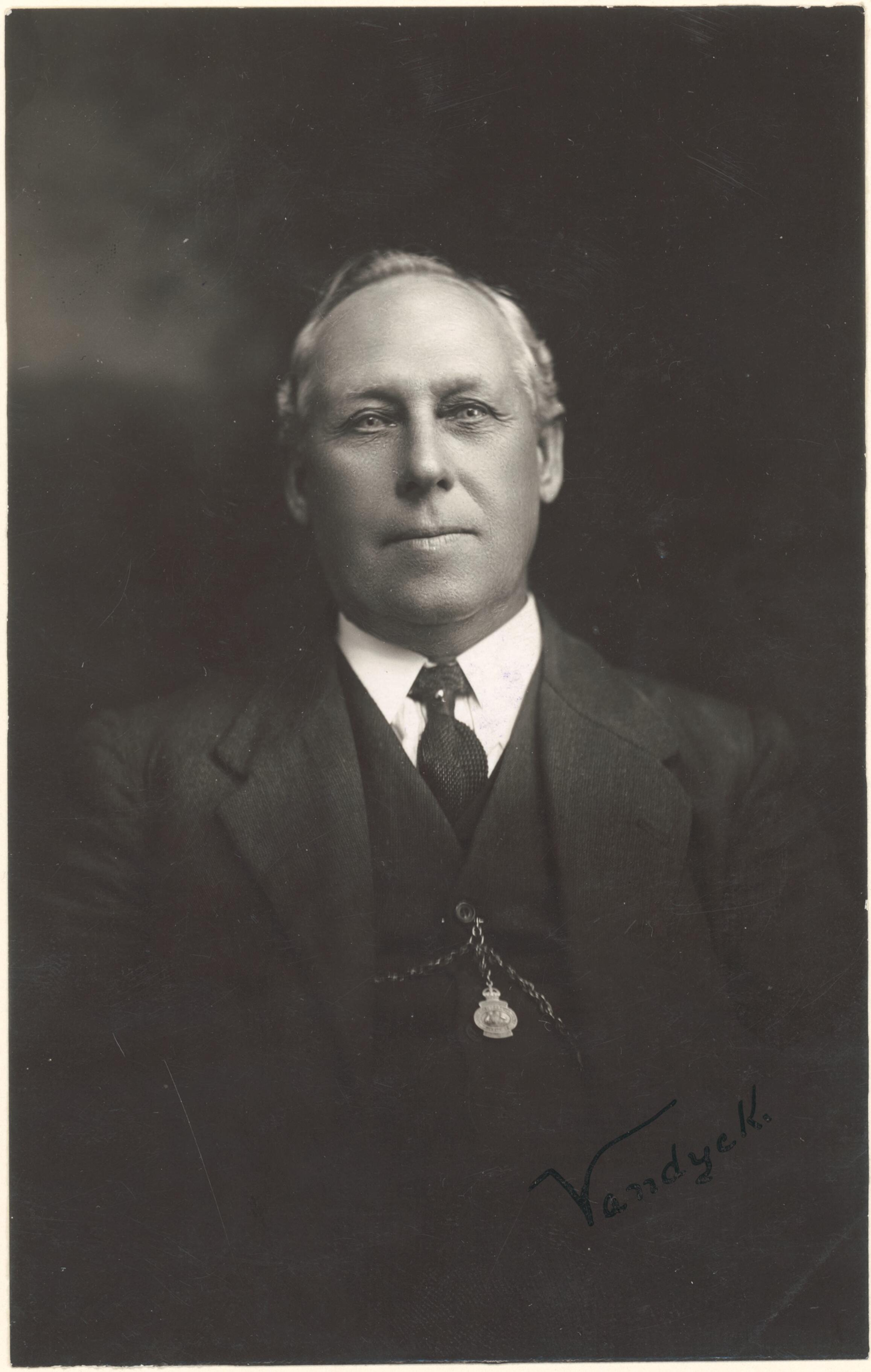

Senator for Western Australia
- In office 1 July 1923 – 30 June 1929

Personal details
- Born: 1867 Christchurch, New Zealand
- Died: 27 March 1938 (aged 71) Clifton Hill, Victoria, Australia
- Party: Australian Labor Party
- Occupation: Tailor

Charles Montague Graham (1867 – 27 March 1938) was an Australian politician born in Christchurch, New Zealand. He worked as a tailor, a union official, and entered the Western Australian parliament. He served as an Australian Labor Party Senator in the 1922 election, holding office from 1 July 1923 to 30 September 1929. He relocated to Victoria and died at Clifton Hill, Melbourne in 1938.

== Background ==
Charles Montague Graham was the eldest son of Patrick Graham, a horse trainer, in Christchurch, New Zealand.

Graham trained as a tailor before moving to Australia. He married Katie Martin on 17 March 1891 in Broken Hill, New South Wales, and lived on Pell Street, Broken Hill, before moving to Western Australia.

In Western Australia, Graham established a business on Piesse Street, Boulder, and served on Boulder's Municipal Council.

Graham died in Melbourne on 27 March 1938 after contracting a brief illness, leaving behind his wife and daughter, Wilmot Jane.

Following the news of Graham's death, it was noted that Graham served as a senator for six years and was elected as a senator for Western Australia in the 1922 general election. He also participated in several select committees, including the Joint Select Committee on Commonwealth Electoral Law and Procedure of 1926 to 1927.

== Political chronology ==
Graham migrated from New Zealand to Australia before 1892. He commenced his political career by becoming a member of Boulder's Municipal Council in 1922. By June 1922, he ranked third on the electoral ticket for the Western Australian Senate. During this time, he also served as the president of his district council (ALP paper as cited in SAWA).

Graham asserted himself as 'a representative of Western Australia' and declared himself 'an Australian.' After positioning himself as representing Western Australia, he raised questions and opinions on Australian issues, contributing to the 'one big union' movement. He toured Australia as one of Western Australia's delegates.

During different political events, Graham successfully became one of Western Australia's delegates in ALP's eleventh Commonwealth Conference, although he was unsuccessful in the 1928 election. Following his defeat, he chose to relocate to Victoria and resided in Clifton Hill, Melbourne.

== Work ==
During his political tenure, Graham voiced opinions on issues including: redistributing some of the Commonwealth bank's profits to the people, inadequate pensions for the elderly, compassion for workers suffering from work-related illnesses, making minor changes to the Conciliation and Arbitration Act, opposing gold bounties, supporting selective immigration, and advocating for the concerns of the Australian Women's Commonwealth Organisations.

At the start of his political career, Graham emphasized the importance of preserving the production of men's caps (soldier caps) as an embodiment of 'true Australian sentiment.' His early actions included questioning 'Invalid and Old-Age Pensions' on 5 July 1923 and, towards the end of his tenure, addressing the government with questions on 'Wireless Advertisements' and 'Retiring Senators' (Sherratt, T. as cited in Historic Hansard). He was primarily known as 'a party man in debate,' indicating his focus on Australian policy, especially that concerning Western Australia.

Before concluding his political career in 1927, he made one of his final speeches, expressing hope that the era when people had to beg for work had ended.

Following the conclusion of his political career, he found employment as a storeman and eventually served on the committee of the Victorian Federated Storeman and Packers Union.

Edward Needham worked closely with Senator Charles Graham in the Western Australian government. Both senators expressed dissatisfaction with the Commonwealth Parliament. In Charles Montague Graham's Biographical Dictionary, Edward Needham's support for Graham's objections to the Commonwealth is highlighted.

The lack of representation for females or different ethnicities in the Northern Territory's government was a common concern that Graham also raised. Various proposals were made about representation but until 1920, during Graham's tenure as a senator, no action was taken on these proposals. The focus on policy and labor policy was a significant aspect of Graham's political career.

After Graham's passing in 1938, further actions were taken in 1975 regarding electoral senate policy between the Commonwealth and Australia across various territories. Graham's advocacy for policy change significantly impacted the Australian government after his death.
