= Charles McHugh (politician) =

Australian politician

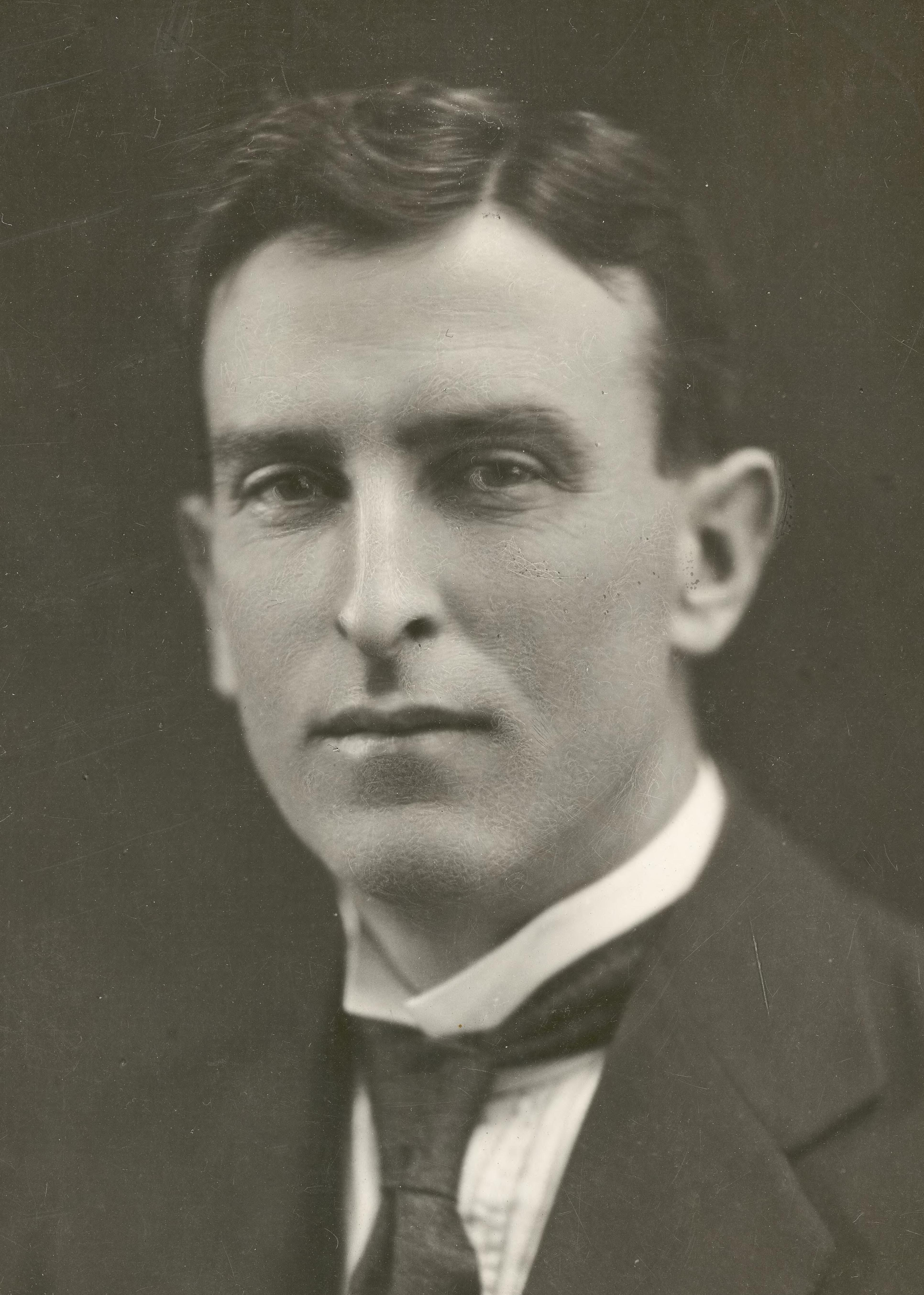

Senator for South Australia
- In office 1 July 1923 – 24 July 1927
- Succeeded by: John Verran

Personal details
- Born: 23 April 1887 Adelaide, South Australia
- Died: 24 July 1927 (aged 40) Launceston, Tasmania, Australia
- Party: Labor
- Spouse: Doreen Monica Hogan (m. 1923)
- Occupation: Clerk

Charles Stephen McHugh (23 April 1887 – 24 July 1927) was an Australian politician. He was a member of the Australian Labor Party (ALP) and served as a Senator for South Australia from 1923 until his death in 1927 at the age of 40.

== Early life ==
McHugh was born on 23 April 1887 in Adelaide, South Australia, the son of Annie (née McNamara) and Edward McHugh. He was educated at Christian Brothers College and worked as a clerk and commercial agent after leaving school. He was interested in public speaking from a young age and served as president of the St Patrick's Literary Society. Before entering the Senate he served on the Thebarton Town Council.

== Politics ==
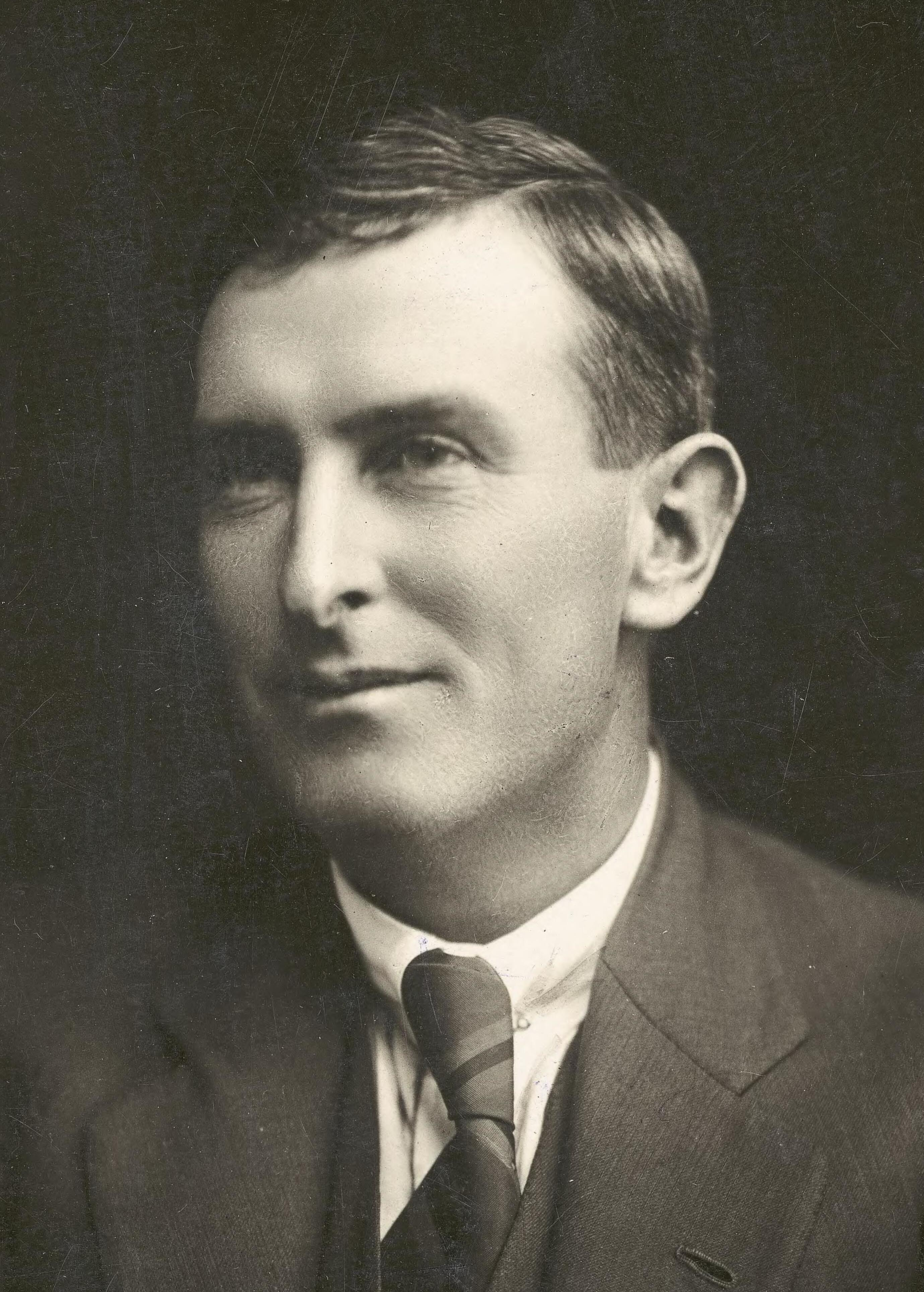
McHugh in 1925

McHugh joined the Australian Labor Party (ALP) in 1909 and eventually became president of the South Australian branch. He was elected to the Senate at the 1922 federal election, to a term beginning on 1 July 1923. In the gap between his election and the start of his term he married Doreen Hogan, with whom he had one son.

In his maiden speech McHugh spoke of the need to achieve "practical Socialism by a sensible method of nationalisation". He argued for the re-introduction of first-past-the-post voting, which he regarded as a fairer system for Senate elections, and called for a referendum to reform or abolish the state upper houses. He was also a strong proponent of the development of the Northern Territory, but opposed the planned introduction of a freehold system of land ownership which he believed would primarily benefit wealthy land speculators. McHugh served on the Printing Committee and the Joint Committee of Public Accounts, and was also a member of the Royal Commission on the Navigation Act, which sat from 1923 to 1925 and issued two reports. He was popular within the Labor Party and in July 1926 was elected to the post of party whip.

=== Death ===
In July 1927, McHugh travelled to Tasmania with the Public Accounts Committee. He was due to travel to Scottsdale with the rest of the committee, but was taken ill and chose to remain in Launceston. His condition rapidly deteriorated and he was admitted to Struan Private Hospital, where he died of pneumonia on 24 July. The South Australian House of Assembly adjourned for two hours to allow members to attend his funeral. John Verran of the Nationalist Party was appointed as his replacement.
