= Alfred Carson =

Australian journalist and social worker

Alfred Carson OBE (7 November 1859 – 24 August 1944) was an Australian journalist and social worker.

== Early life and education ==
Carson was born on 7 November 1859 at Upper Swan in Western Australia to wheelwright George Carson and Charlotte Hadley Carson. He attended the Guildford government school.

== Career ==
He began teaching at Perth Boys' School as an assistant master when he was eighteen. Carson went on to become headmaster of the Geraldton Boys School in August 1878.

In 1887, he joined the staff of the Victorian Express and was soon the editor. In July 1892, he was appointed inaugural editor of the Geraldton and Murchison Telegraph. In 1895, he went to work at the Daily News.

In January 1896, he worked for The West Australian, eventually becoming associate editor. In 1912 ,he became editor of the Western Mail and in 1917 conducted the West Australian's case in the Commonwealth Court of Conciliation and Arbitration case that determined the first journalists' award. He also travelled to the Western Front and the United Kingdom in 1918 as Western Australia's press representative.

Carson ran for parliament at the 1922 federal election, unsuccessfully contesting Perth as one of four endorsed Nationalists. He returned to journalism retiring in 1938 until he resumed work in 1941 as a result of staff shortages caused by World War II.

Carson also had an active career in social work, founding the Infant Health Association and serving as president of the Silver Chain District Nursing Association and chairman of the Bush Nursing Society.

== Awards and honours ==
In 1941, he was appointed Officer of the Order of the British Empire.

== Personal life and death ==
Carson married Eva Massingham of Dongara on 5 August 1884. He died in Perth on 24 August 1944. He was 84.
