= Jean Daley =

Australian political organiser (1881–1948)

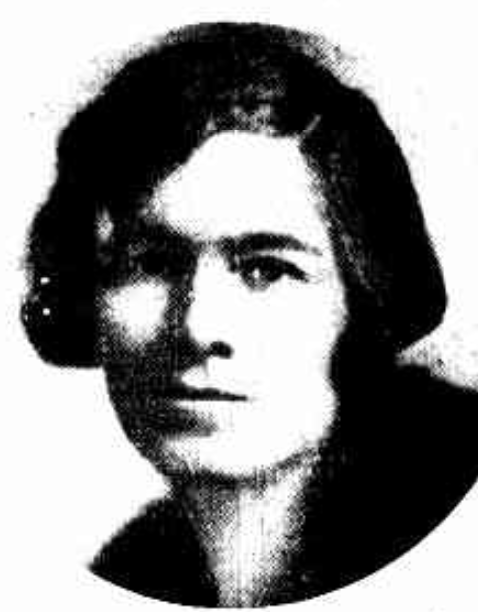
- Born: 24 September 1881; Mount Gambier
- Died: 5 November 1948; Melbourne
- Occupation: Trade unionist

Jane "Jean" Daley (24 September 1881 – 5 November 1948) was an Australian political organiser.

== Early life ==
Born at Mount Gambier in South Australia to Robert Dennis Daley and Julia Ann, née Scott, she was educated at convents; the family later moved to Victoria and she attended Loreto Convent in Portland. Her father was an early member of the Amalgamated Shearers' Union of Australasia.

She bore an illegitimate child in Melbourne in 1906 before returning to her family home at Wallacedale, near Hamilton.

== Political career ==
Having become known as Jean, she moved to Melbourne in 1909 and joined the Women's Organising Committee of the Political Labor Council of Victoria.

A 1916 Hotel and Caterers' Union delegate to the Trades Hall Council and an early member of the Militant Propaganda League, she was an executive member of the Victorian Socialist Party from 1916 to 1917.

An organiser of the Labor Women's Anti-Conscription Committee from its formation in September 1916, she was a political rival of Vida Goldstein and subsequently became vice-president of the Labor Women's Campaign Committee, a rival group. She was inaugural president of the re-formed Women's Central Organising Committee from 1918 to 1920 and supported pacifism and the industrial organisation of women.

Defeated by Mary Rogers for the post of Labor women's organiser in 1919, she was elected a delegate to the 1921 federal conference and later that year was elected to the central executive and as a delegate to the All Australia Trade Union Congress, also publishing a series of articles on the Australian anti-conscription movement in the Seattle Union Record.

At the 1922 federal election she stood as the first female Labor Party candidate in Victoria, unsuccessfully contesting the safe conservative seat of Kooyong.

Finally being elected women's organiser in 1926, Daley was instrumental in the formation of the Labor Women's Interstate Executive in 1929 (secretary, 1930–47) and continued to be highly active in the union movement throughout the 1930s.

Forced to resign her various posts in 1947 due to ill health, she died in 1948 of liver disease at the Alfred Hospital. She never married.

== Legacy ==
A bookplate entitled Jean Daley (1930) by Eric Thake (1904 – 1982) is on display at the Art Gallery of South Australia.
