= Harald Jensen (geologist) =

Australian geologist

Dr Harald Jensen
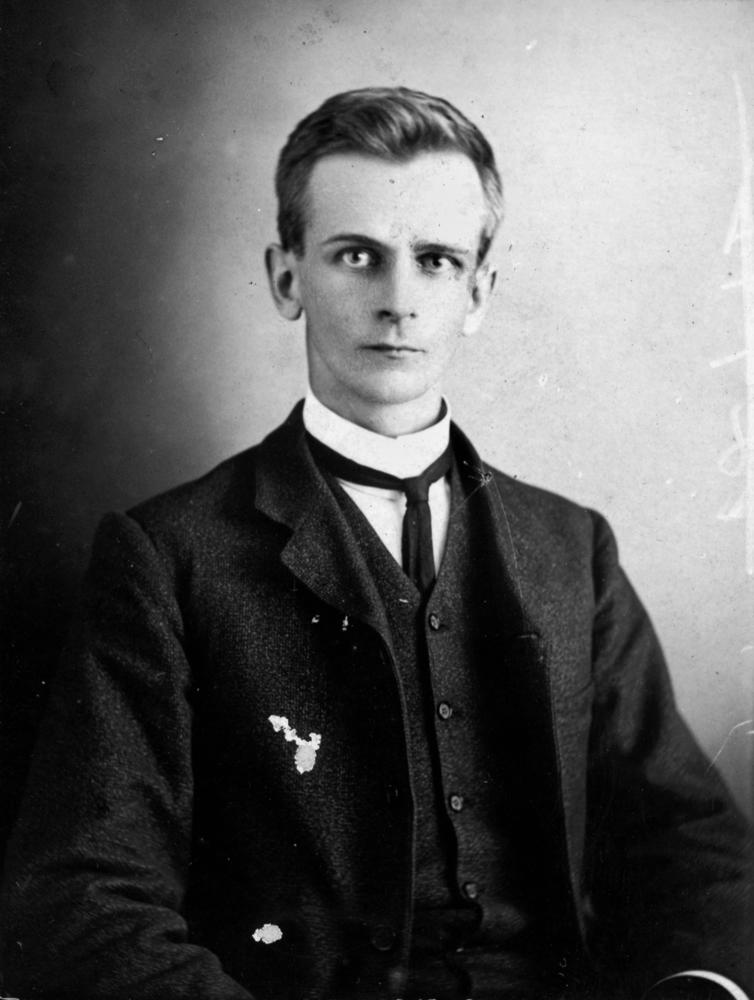
- Jensen in 1906
- Born: 12 June 1879; Aarhus, Denmark
- Died: 13 July 1966 (aged 87); Brisbane, Queensland, Australia
- Education: University of Sydney
- Occupations: Geologist; Academic; Public servant
- Spouse: Jane England (m. 1906; div. 1937)

Harald Ingemann Jensen (12 June 1879 – 13 July 1966) was an Australian geologist, academic, public servant and political candidate. He was born in Denmark and came to Australia as a young child.

== Early life ==
Harald Jensen was born in 1879 in Aarhus, Jutland to farmer Niels Georg Oscar Jensen and Clara (née Nielsen), the latter of whom was purported to be a descendant of the great Danish poet Bernhard Severin Ingemann. Around 1885 the family migrated to Queensland, where young Harald attended public schools before winning a scholarship to Brisbane Boys' Grammar School. In 1898, Jensen was employed at Clement Wragge's observatory at Mount Kosciuszko before briefly studying at the University of Sydney; he took time off from 1900 to 1901 to teach in Sydney and North Queensland before returning to his studies in 1902, receiving a Bachelor of Science specialising in geology in 1904. He was employed as an assistant demonstrator to Edgeworth David before becoming the first Macleay fellow of the Linnean Society of New South Wales in 1905, allowing him to travel extensively in the Pacific, including to Fiji, Samoa, Tonga and New Zealand. He married Jane Elizabeth Ellen England on 26 September 1906 in Sydney. In 1908 he was awarded a Doctorate of Science and a university medal, and was employed by the New South Wales Department of Agriculture as a soil scientist, publishing Soils of New South Wales in 1914.

== Career ==
Appointed director of mines in the Northern Territory in August 1912, he found himself in opposition to the Administrator, John Gilruth, who had him demoted in 1915, although he remained chief geologist. Jensen wrote to the minister for external affairs and territories and precipitated a royal commission into Gilruth's administration, which ultimately found against Jensen (a public service inquiry later exonerated him of making disloyal comments) and led to his forced resignation in September 1915. He returned to Queensland in 1917 and became a government geologist.

In 1923 Jensen was employed as a consultant geologist, searching for oil in the Roma basin and in New Guinea. Divorced in 1937, in 1938 he was appointed leader of the Queensland section of the Aerial Geological and Geophysical Survey of North Australia, which continued until 1940. He later became interested in meteorology and published Seasonal Forecasting in 1956.

== Politics ==
Jensen was a member of the Australian Labor Party, publishing The Rising Tide: An Exposition of Australian Socialism in 1909 in which he advocated protectionism. He contested the 1917 federal election as Labor candidate for Lilley. He ran on the Labor Senate tickets in 1922 and 1925, but was expelled from the party in August 1926 after attacking a perceived move away from socialism (he would run again for the Senate in 1928 as an independent).

== Personal life ==
Jensen married Jane England in Sydney in 1906. They were divorced in 1937. Jensen died in 1966 in Brisbane after being badly burnt in a grass fire. He was survived by five children. Two boxes of his papers are held in the Fryer Library at The University of Queensland.
