= James Newman (mining engineer) =

James Malcolm Newman CBE (20 June 1880 – 23 November 1973) was an Australian mining engineer and grazier.

Newman was born at Caboolture in Queensland to Irish-born labourer and farmer James Newman and Elizabeth, née Irwin. He attended Brisbane Grammar School and the University of Sydney, graduating with a Bachelor of Engineering specialising in mining and metallurgy in 1901. From 1902, he worked as a trucker, timberman, miner and assistant surveyor at Broken Hill; he moved to Western Australia in 1904 to work as a surveyor with Peak Hill Goldfield Ltd, of which he was general manager in 1907. He married Elizabeth Maud in Perth on 3 October 1908, although they were later divorced.

Newman returned to Queensland in 1908 to become a consultant to Mount Morgan Gold Mining Co. Ltd, subsequently joining the engineering staff until he returned to consultancy in 1912, after which he worked in Papua and Malaya. He served with the Malay States Guides in World War I and then formed Alluvial Tin (Malaya) Ltd in 1923 with Graham Pratten. The pair extended their business to Siam, Borneo and Burma before selling the company in 1927. Newman returned to Caboolture, and on 16 February 1927 married Gwendoline Nita Stephenson; they settled in a thirty-eight room mansion. Newman bought extensive property in rural Queensland and the Northern Territory, acquiring dairy farms, pineapple plantations, and cattle studs like Anthony Lagoon Station. In 1942 he was appointed controller of minerals production and given the task of increasing production of strategic minerals like tungsten and tin. He moved briefly to Melbourne, during which time the Royal Australian Navy used his home; he later donated the property as a war veterans' home and lived in Beachmere. Appointed Commander of the Order of the British Empire in 1957, he was awarded the medal of the Australasian Institute of Mining and Metallurgy in 1960. He died at St Lucia in 1973.
