= 1922 Yarra by-election =

- 18 February 1922
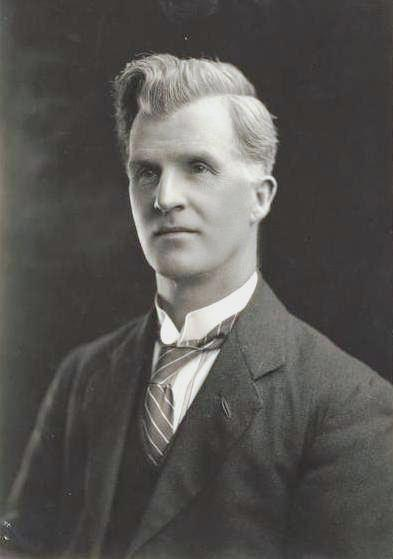
	First party	Second party
		NAT
Candidate	James Scullin	Andrew Davidson
Party	Labor	Nationalist
Popular vote	12,553	3,473
Percentage	77.7%	21.5%
Swing	▲7.4pp	▼8.2pp
TPP	78.1%	21.9%
TPP swing	▲7.8pp	▼7.8pp
MP before election
Frank Tudor
Labor
Elected MP
James Scullin
Labor

A by-election was held for the Australian House of Representatives seat of Yarra on 18 February 1922. This was triggered by the death of Labor MP Frank Tudor, the Leader of the Opposition.

The by-election was won by Labor candidate and future Prime Minister James Scullin.

== Results ==
Yarra by-election, 1922
Party	Candidate	Votes	%	±%
Labor	James Scullin	12,553	77.7	+7.4
Nationalist	Andrew Davidson	3,473	21.5	−8.2
Independent	Frederick Smyth	129	0.8	+0.8
Total formal votes		16,155	96.5	
Informal votes		590	3.5	
Turnout		16,745	42.8	
Two-party-preferred result
Labor	James Scullin		78.1	+7.8
Nationalist	Andrew Davidson		21.9	−7.8
Labor hold		Swing	+7.8	
