= Alfred Foster (judge) =

Australian judge

Alfred William Foster (28 July 1886 – 26 November 1962) was an Australian judge.

== Biography ==
Foster was born at Beechworth to tobacconist Alfred William Foster and Sarah, née Brown. He attended school locally and graduated from Beechworth College at the age of fourteen. Interested in spiritualism, around this time Foster rejected Christianity as lacking in scientific evidence. He moved to Melbourne to study law in 1906, where he joined the Victorian Rationalist Association; after a defeat in a debate on socialism against a Victorian Socialist Party team including John Curtin, Foster became a convert to socialism and joined the party himself. He was called to the Bar in June 1910 but struggled in his early legal career.

In 1914 Foster became a prominent opponent of Australia's involvement in World War I, and he was later a strident anti-conscriptionist, defending those charged under the War Precautions Act and risking conviction himself with some of his speeches. He was also opposed to the Hughes government's censorship laws, and joined the Labor Party during the war, becoming a member of the central executive and standing for the federal seat of Balaclava in 1917 following the party split. He had married Beatrice May Warden on 12 January 1916. He joined the Food Preservers' Union, of which he became president, and was a delegate to the Victorian ALP Conference and the Trades Hall Council. He unsuccessfully contested the federal seat of Fawkner in 1922 and 1925.

In 1920 Foster was appointed as union advocate to the royal commission on the basic wage and successfully argued for an increase, although the recommendation was not implemented. His wife died from cancer in 1925. In 1924 he was counsel assisting the royal commission on the 1923 Melbourne police strike, and in 1926 represented the New South Wales and Queensland Labor governments in the Commonwealth Court of Conciliation and Arbitration case regarding standard working hours. In 1927 he resigned all political positions to become a judge in the County Court of Victoria; while he enforced the written laws he continued to advocate reform. On 25 January 1927 he married Ella Wilhelmina Jones. In 1934 he attracted controversy for telling a young witness, "There is no hell, sonny." He became a pacifist in the 1930s and after the outbreak of World War II supported close relations with the Soviet Union.

In October 1942 Foster was appointed to head the Women's Employment Board before being transferred to the Commonwealth Arbitration Court in October 1944. He was involved in a major case on standard hours that ran from 1945 to 1947 and delivered the judgement on the forty-hour week. In 1950 he influenced the decision to increase the weekly wage by £1. Despite being considered early in his term as a champion for the unions, he decided against eight officials who defied the Chifley government's emergency laws against assisting strikers in 1949. In 1952 he was assigned to the maritime industry and encouraged the replacement of outdated vessels, created a new seamen's award in 1955 and adjusted it to placate shipowners in 1960. He died at Sandringham in 1962.
