= John Grant (Australian politician) =

Scottish-born Australian politician

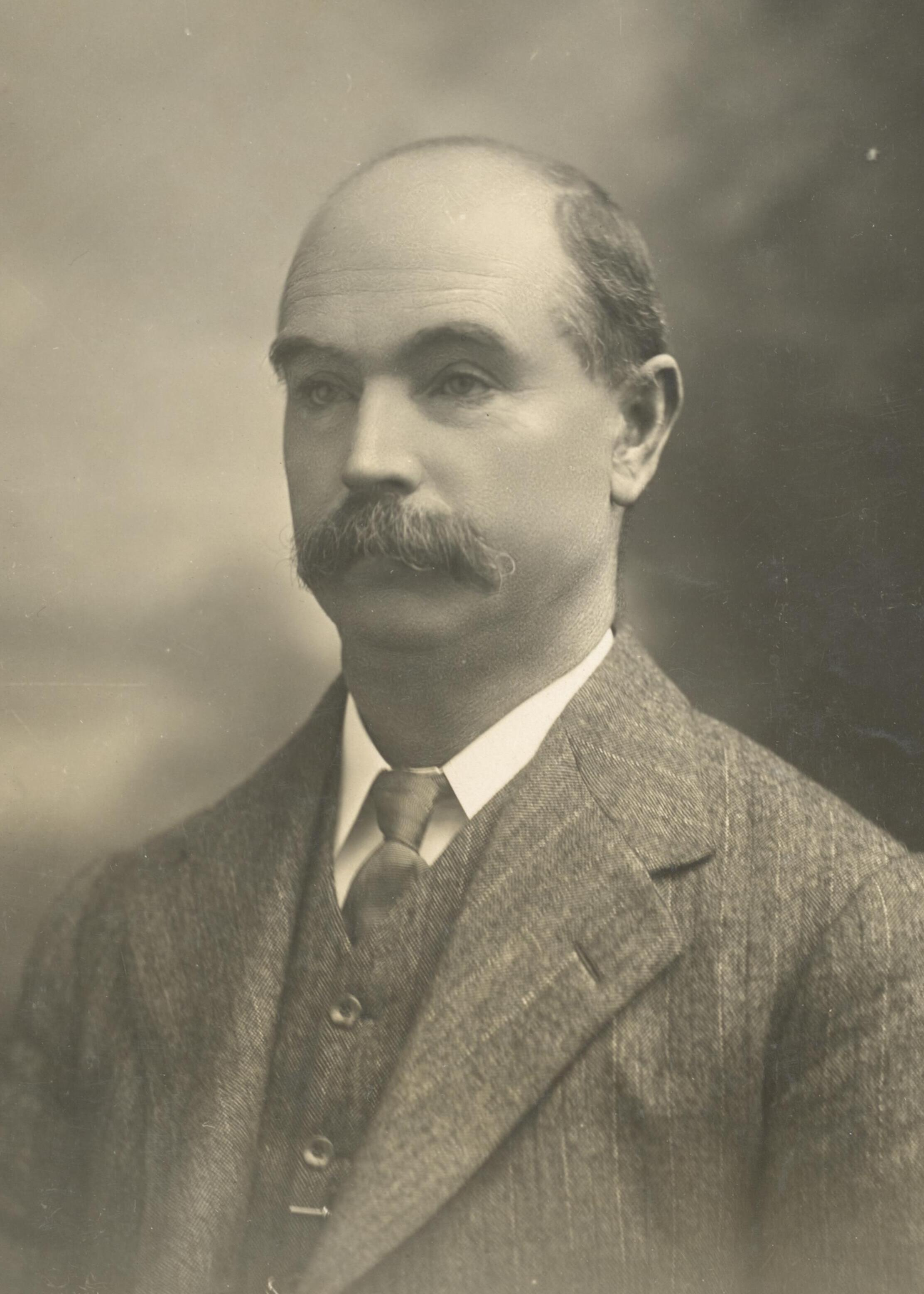

Senator for New South Wales
- In office 5 September 1914 – 30 June 1920
- In office 1 July 1923 – 19 May 1928
- Succeeded by: Albert Gardiner

Personal details
- Born: 1857 Abernethy, Scotland
- Died: 19 May 1928 (aged 70–71) Annandale, New South Wales, Australia
- Party: Australian Labor Party
- Spouse: Maet Anne Grant
- Occupation: Stonemason

John Grant (1857 – 19 May 1928) was a Scottish-born Australian politician. He was married to the politician Mary Anne Grant.

== Life ==
Born in Abernethy, he received a primary education before becoming a stonemason. Migrating to the Colony of New South Wales in 1880, he became Secretary of the Stonemasons' Union and a founding member of the New South Wales Labor Party. He served as the NSW ALP's General Secretary.

He married Scottish born Mary Anne Grant (born Kearney) and she was one of the six women elected to the New South Wales Labor Party's executive in January 1906. The other five were Kate Dwyer, Harriet Powell, the 1903 parliamentary candidate Selina Siggins, the American born A. E. Gardiner, Edith Bethel and Maggie Hall. He and Mary had one child, Frank.

He was elected to the Australian Senate in 1914 as a Labor Senator from New South Wales. Defeated in 1919, he returned to the Senate in 1922, holding the seat until his death in 1928.
