= Majority Labor Party =

Australian political party

The Majority Labor Party, sometimes called the Majority Australian Labor Party, was an Australian political party formed by federal Australian Labor Party MP James Catts in 1922. It did not win any seats in parliament.

Catts resigned from the Labor Party in 1922, blaming the loss of the 1922 state election on Irishism, Bolshevism and Tammanyism within the party. It was also associated with the recently elected state member for Newcastle, Walter Skelton, and his Protestant Labor Party. The party contested the 1922 federal election, but with little success, and ceased to exist shortly afterwards.
