= Leonard Darlot =

Australian politician

Leonard Hawthorne Darlot (18 September 1862 – 3 August 1943) was an Australian politician. He was a member of the Western Australian Legislative Assembly from 1900 to 1901, representing De Grey. His brother, Everard Darlot, was also an MP.
