= 1922 Australian federal election =

- 16 December 1922

All 76 (Note: The Northern Territory had one seat, but members for the territories did not have full voting rights until 1966 and did not count toward government formation.) seats in the House of Representatives 38 seats were needed for a majority in the House 19 (of the 36) seats in the Senate
- Registered: 2,980,424 ▲4.58%
- Turnout: 1,646,863 (59.36%) (Note: Turnout in contested seats) (▼18.94 pp)
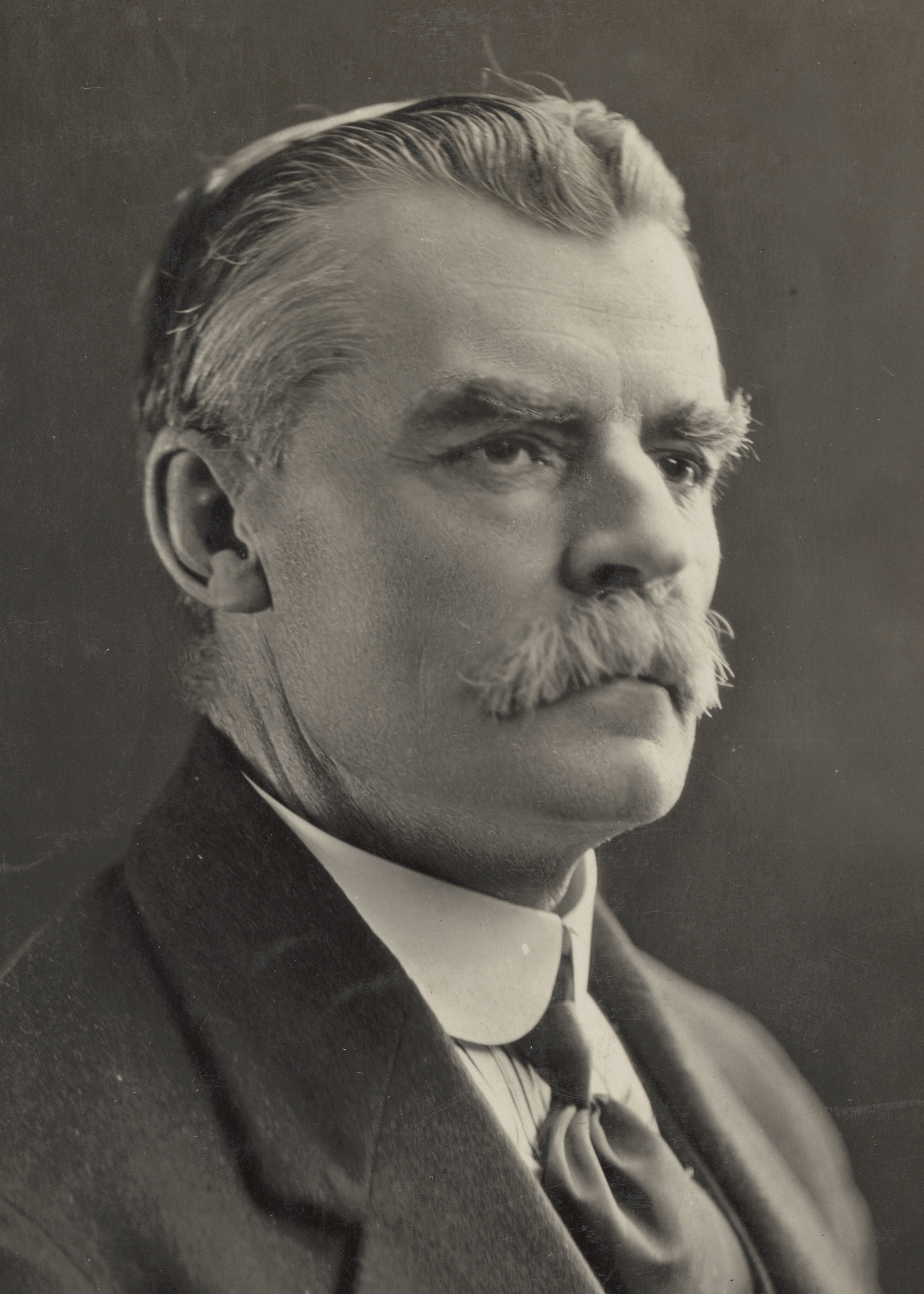

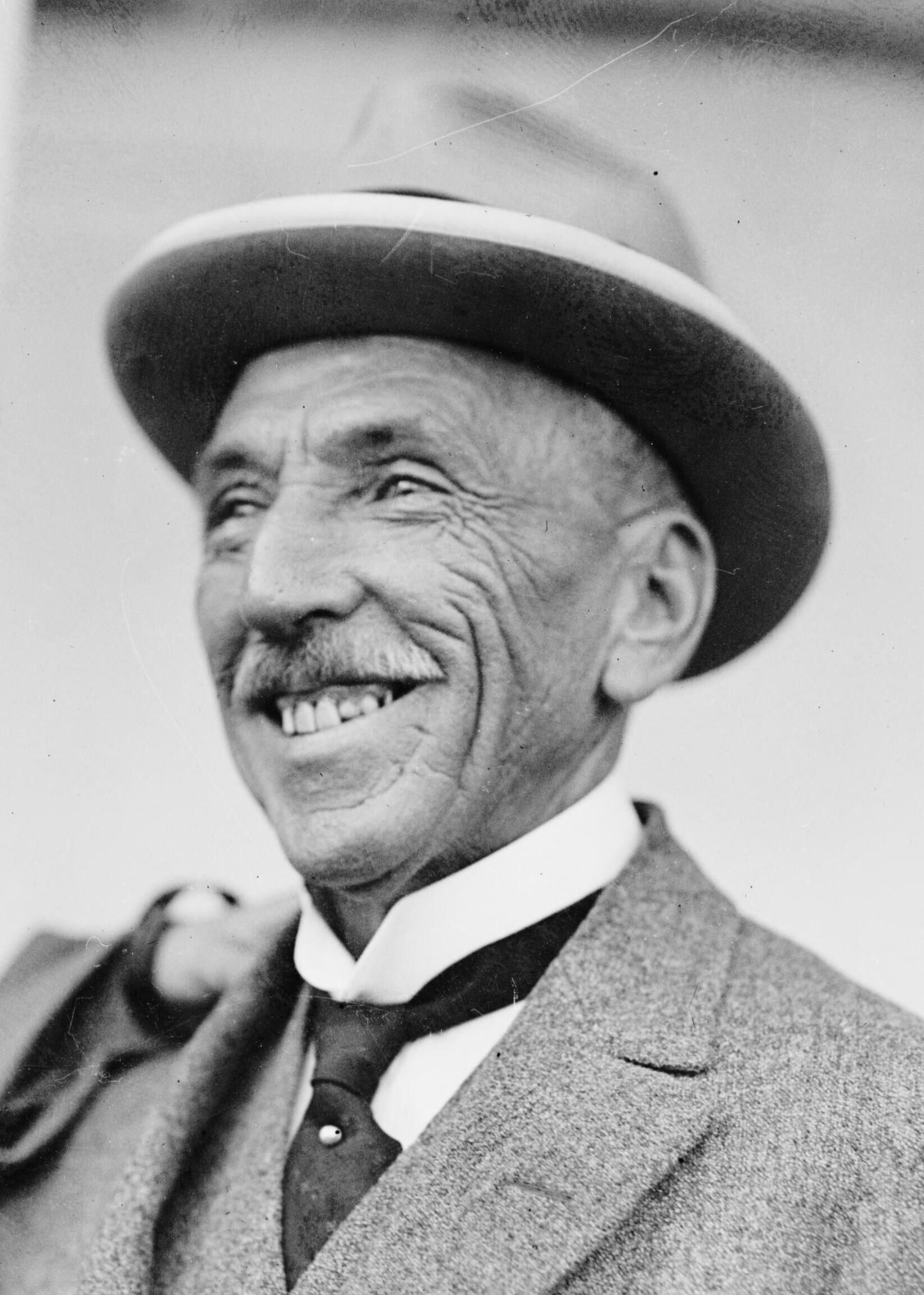

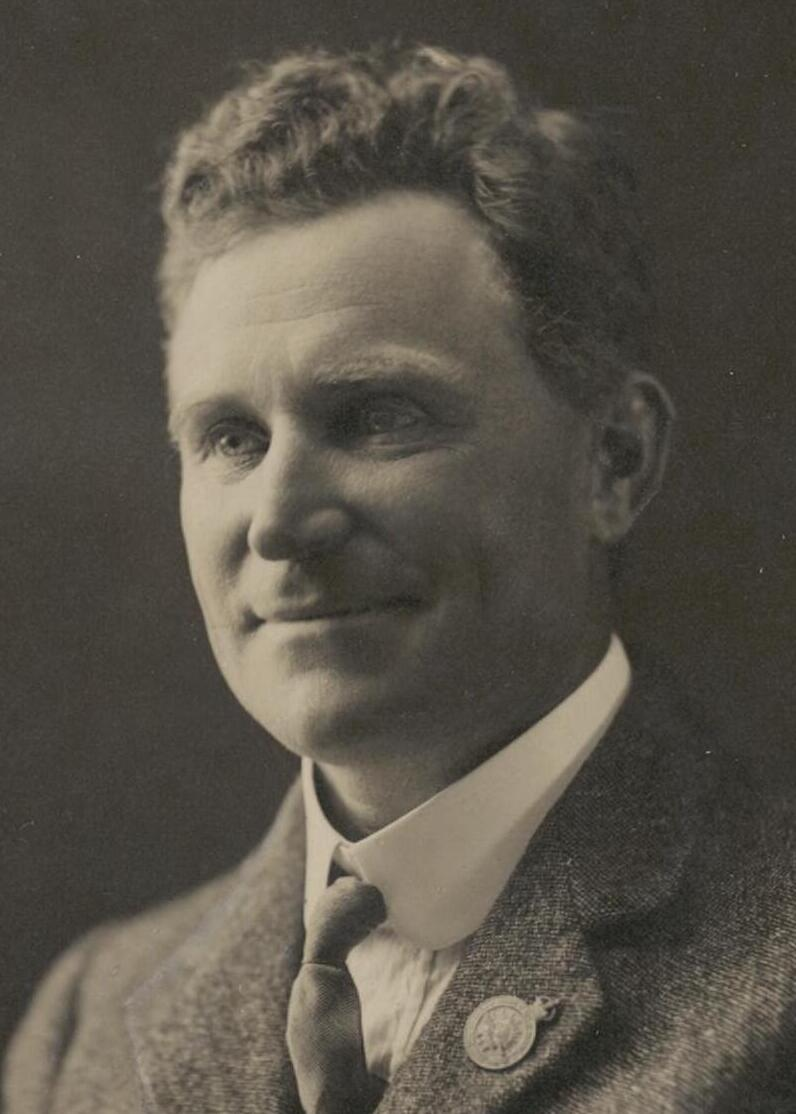
	First party	Second party	Third party
Leader	Matthew Charlton	Billy Hughes	Earle Page
Party	Labor	Nationalist	Country
Leader since	16 May 1922	14 November 1916	5 April 1921
Leader's seat	Hunter (NSW)	won North Sydney (NSW) (Note: Hughes' seat prior to the election was Bendigo (Vic.). He ran for the New South Wales seat of North Sydney and won.)	Cowper (NSW)
Last election	26 seats	37 seats	11 seats
Seats won	29 + NT	26	14
Seat change	▲4	▼11	▲3
First preference vote	665,145	553,920	197,513
Percentage	42.30%	35.23%	12.56%
Swing	▼0.19%	▼9.85%	▲3.30%
- Results by division for the House of Representatives, shaded by winning party's margin of victory.
Prime Minister before election
Billy Hughes
Nationalist
Subsequent Prime Minister
Stanley Bruce
Nationalist/Country coalition

The 1922 Australian federal election was held on 16 December 1922 to elect members to the Parliament of Australia. All 76 seats in the House of Representatives and 19 of the 36 seats in the Senate were up for election. The incumbent Nationalist Party government failed to win a majority and instead formed a coalition with the Country Party, with Stanley Bruce replacing Billy Hughes as Nationalist leader and prime minister.

The election was held following a period of parliamentary instability, with the Nationalists governing in minority. The main issue of the campaign was Hughes' leadership, which had become increasingly divisive and led to anti-Hughes factions running against endorsed Nationalists. The opposition Australian Labor Party (ALP), led by Matthew Charlton, emerged as the largest single party in the House but with no reasonable prospect of forming government. Page and the Country Party strengthened their parliamentary position and won a clear balance of power, which they used to force Hughes' resignation. A new government was not formed until February 1923, with Bruce as prime minister and Page as deputy prime minister.

== Background ==
The 1919 federal election had resulted in a hung parliament, with the newly formed Country Party holding the balance of power. Prime Minister Billy Hughes' Nationalist Party government was reliant on the support of the Country Party to pass legislation. Country Party leader Earle Page used the situation to his advantage, bargaining for concessions and refusing to guarantee support for confidence motions.

A vote of confidence held in October 1921 on the government's budget passed by only a single vote, when Country MP Alexander Hay abstained from voting. The following month, Hughes made an explicit offer of cabinet portfolios to Page, but on 30 November the Country Party "resolved to have no compromise with Hughes, but to concentrate on getting enough members at the next election to control parliament and insist on his removal".

ALP leader Frank Tudor died in office in January 1922, after a long period of ill health. He was replaced as party leader and opposition leader by New South Wales MP Matthew Charlton, who had been acting leader for some time, although he was not formally confirmed in the position until May 1922.

== Campaign ==
According to Hughes' biographer L. F. Fitzhardinge, "observers noted that the campaign that followed was one of the dullest on record, all parties being received with equal indifference". Gavin Souter's history of the Australian Parliament likewise describes the 1922 election as "probably the dullest yet in federal history".

=== Nationalist Party ===
Hughes opened the Nationalist campaign on 4 October 1922 at the Willoughby Town Hall in Chatswood, New South Wales. Following an electoral redistribution, he had declined to recontest his existing seat of Bendigo in Victoria and instead returned to his home state of New South Wales to contest the safe Nationalist seat of North Sydney. The government's platform included a constitutional convention, the introduction of industrial tribunals, public service reforms and acceleration of the construction of Canberra. Hughes also promised to reduce government regulation of the coal and sugar industries, increase government-sponsored migration and provide more assistance to farmers.

For many voters, Hughes' leadership was the defining issue of the election. In Melbourne, disaffected liberals – including Hughes' former treasurer William Watt – stood on explicit anti-Hughes platform, with John Latham running under the slogan "Hughes must go!". The Nationalists in South Australia split into the pro-Hughes National Labor faction and the anti-Hughes Liberal Union faction, running separate House and Senate candidates.

=== Australian Labor Party ===
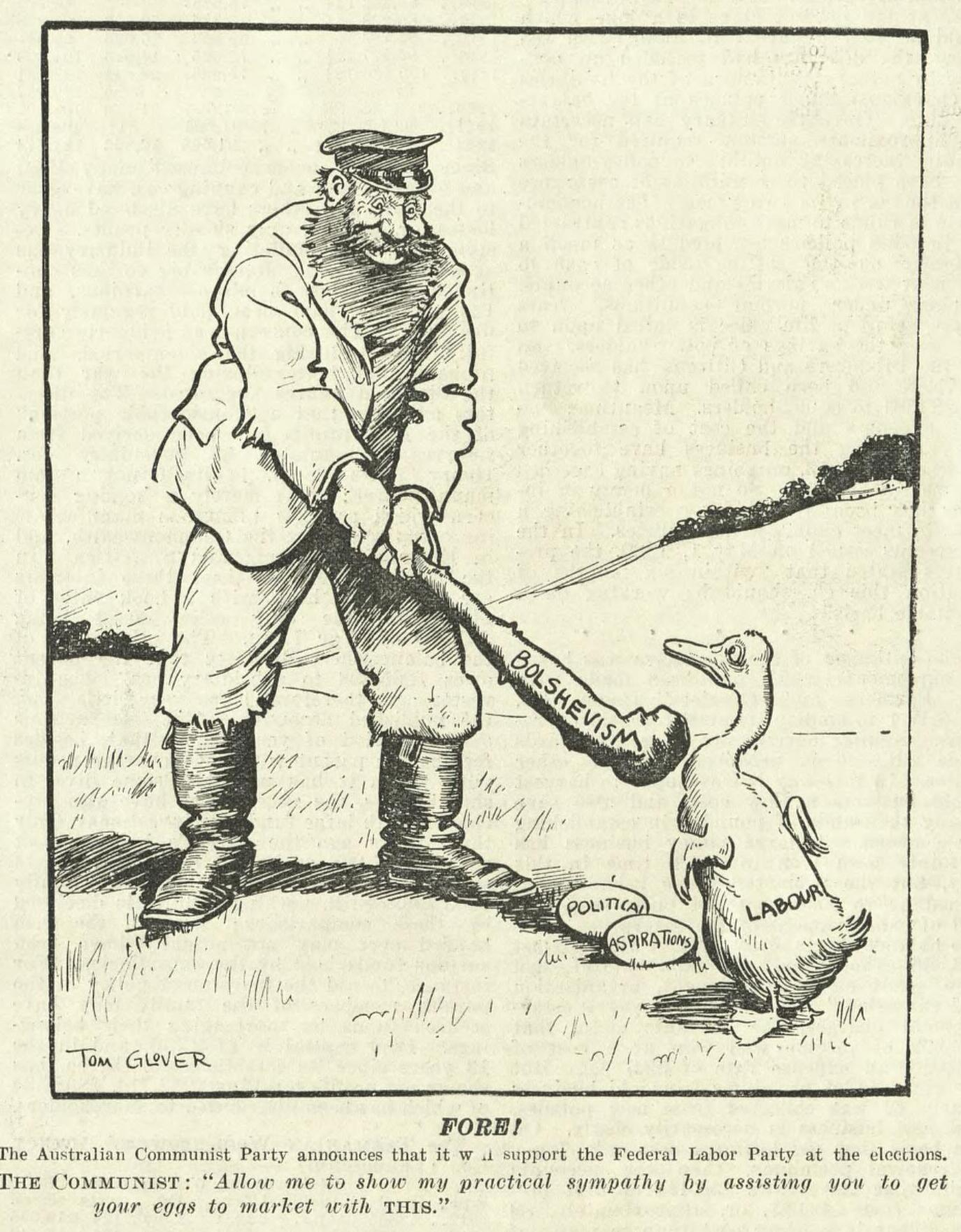
Tom Glover cartoon mocking the Communist Party's endorsement of the ALP (The Bulletin)

Charlton presented the ALP's campaign speech on the same day in Maitland, New South Wales, a "long and prosy exposition of orthodox Labor policies". He advocated "policies of national development under a unified government with regional devolution of powers, tariff protection and limited immigration". Charlton was briefly hospitalised during the campaign.

Several ALP breakaway groups contested the election in opposition to official ALP candidates. New South Wales MP James Catts was expelled from the ALP in April 1922 and subsequently made "lurid allegations of corruption". He recontested his seat for a new Majority Labor Party which fielded seven candidates at the election. On the left, Michael Considine quit the ALP in 1920 and recontested his seat for the Industrial Socialist Labor Party.

=== Country Party ===
The Country Party platform presented by Page included decentralisation, reduction in government expenditure and public debt, tariff and agricultural marketing reforms, and rural credits (a form of government subsidy for primary producers). He also supported placing the Commonwealth Bank under an independent board, tasked with supporting national development projects. His speech was critical of Hughes, alleging broken promises and describing the prime minister as having "total disregard of the financial position of the country".

== Results ==
=== House of Representatives ===
Labor: 29 seats Nationalist: 26 seats Country: 14 seats Independent: 1 seat Liberal: 5 seats

House of Reps (IRV) – 1922–25—Turnout 59.36% (Non-CV) – Informal 4.51%
Party	First preference votes	%	Swing	Seats	Change
Labor	665,145	42.30	−0.19	30 (Note: Including Northern Territory)	▲4
Nationalist	553,920	35.23	−9.85	26	▼11
Country	197,513	12.56	+3.30	14	▲3
Liberal Union	37,904	2.41	+2.41	3	▲3
Liberal	32,167	2.04	+2.04	2	▲2
Constitutionalist	11,812	0.75	+0.75	0	Steady
Majority Labor	10,303	0.66	+0.66	0	Steady
Industrial Labor	4,331	0.28	+0.09	0	Steady
Protestant Labor	3,631	0.23	+0.23	0	Steady
NT Representation League	362	0.02	+0.02	0	Steady
Independents	51,538	3.28	+1.86	1	Steady
Total	1,572,514			76	▲1
Two-party-preferred (estimated)
Nationalist	Win	51.20	−2.90	40	+3
Labor		48.80	+2.90	29	0

Notes

- Independents: William Watson (Fremantle, WA)
- Five members were elected unopposed – one Labor, two Nationalist, one Country, and one Liberal.

First preference vote
Labor	42.30%
Nationalist	35.23%
Country	12.56%
Liberal	4.70%
Independent/Others	5.22%

Two-party-preferred vote
Coalition	51.20%
Labor	48.80%

Parliament seats
Coalition	53.33%
Labor	38.67%
Liberal	6.67%
Independent	1.33%

=== Senate ===
Senate (P BV) – 1922–1925—Turnout 57.99% (Non-CV) – Informal 9.44%
Party	First preference Votes	%	Swing	Seats won	Seats held	Change
Labor	715,219	45.70	+2.86	11	12	+11
Nationalist	567,084	36.23	−10.16	8	24	−11
Country	203,267	12.99	+4.20	0	0	0
Liberal Union	43,706	2.79	+2.79	0	0	0
Socialist Labor	8,551	0.55	+0.55	0	0	0
Majority Labor	3,813	0.24	+0.24	0	0	0
Independents	23,447	1.50	+0.08	0	0	0
Total	1,565,087			19	36	

== Seats changing hands ==
Seat	Pre-1922			Swing	Post-1922		
Seat	Party	Member	Margin	Swing	Margin	Member	Party
Adelaide, SA	Nationalist	Reginald Blundell	0.8	8.0	3.6	George Edwin Yates	Labor
Balaclava, Vic	Nationalist	William Watt	N/A	100.0	100.0	William Watt	Liberal
Barker, SA	Nationalist	John Livingston	N/A	N/A	2.3	Malcolm Cameron	Liberal Union
Barton, NSW	Nationalist	notional – new seat	N/A	13.8	7.6	Frederick McDonald	Labor
Boothby, SA	Nationalist	William Story	N/A	N/A	4.7	Jack Duncan-Hughes	Liberal Union
Calare, NSW	Labor	Thomas Lavelle	2.3	8.5	5.3	Neville Howse	Nationalist
Darwin, Tas	Nationalist	George Bell	4.0	N/A	0.4	Joshua Whitsitt	Country
Denison, Tas	Nationalist	William Laird Smith	3.9	4.3	0.4	David O'Keefe	Labor
Fremantle, WA	Nationalist	Reginald Burchell	N/A	56.9	6.9	William Watson	Independent
Gippsland, Vic	Nationalist	George Wise	5.2	18.1	12.9	Thomas Paterson	Country
Grey, SA	Nationalist	Alexander Poynton	1.8	5.5	3.7	Andrew Lacey	Labor
Henty, Vic	Independent	Frederick Francis	2.9	8.7	5.8	Frederick Francis	Nationalist
Kalgoorlie, WA	Nationalist	George Foley	1.4	7.1	7.4	Albert Green	Labor
Kooyong, Vic	Nationalist	Robert Best	14.3	14.9	0.6	John Latham	Liberal
Macquarie, NSW	Labor	Samuel Nicholls	3.2	0.6	0.2	Arthur Manning	Nationalist
New England, NSW	Nationalist	Alexander Hay*	7.3	N/A	8.5	Victor Thompson	Country
Northern Territory, NT	new division				0.4	H. G. Nelson	Labor
Richmond, NSW	Nationalist	Walter Massy-Greene	22.5	24.0	3.3	Roland Green	Country
Riverina, NSW	Nationalist	John Chanter	N/A	54.3	4.3	William Killen	Country
Wakefield, SA	Nationalist	Richard Foster	N/A	N/A	5.3	Richard Foster	Liberal Union
Wannon, Vic	Nationalist	Arthur Rodgers	4.1	4.9	0.8	John McNeill	Labor
Wilmot, Tas	Nationalist	Llewellyn Atkinson	10.2	N/A	11.2	Llewellyn Atkinson	Country

- Members listed in italics did not contest their seat at this election.
- *Alexander Hay contested his seat as an independent

== Post-election pendulum ==
Government seats
Nationalist/Country coalition
Marginal
Macquarie (NSW)	Arthur Manning	NAT	00.2
Darwin (Tas)	Joshua Whitsitt	CP	00.4 v NAT
Corio (Vic)	John Lister	NAT	00.8
Bendigo (Vic)	Geoffry Hurry	NAT	01.7
Herbert (Qld)	Fred Bamford	NAT	01.7
Brisbane (Qld)	Donald Cameron	NAT	02.0
Richmond (NSW)	Roland Green	CP	03.3
Oxley (Qld)	James Bayley	NAT	03.3
Bass (Tas)	Syd Jackson	NAT	03.6
Corangamite (Vic)	William Gibson	CP	03.9
Riverina (NSW)	William Killen	CP	04.3
Lang (NSW)	Elliot Johnson	NAT	04.4
Maranoa (Qld)	James Hunter	CP	04.4
Calare (NSW)	Neville Howse	NAT	05.3
Flinders (Vic)	Stanley Bruce	NAT	05.6 v LIB
Henty (Vic)	Frederick Francis	NAT	05.8 v NAT
Fairly safe
Franklin (Tas)	Alfred Seabrook	NAT	06.3
Fawkner (Vic)	George Maxwell	NAT	08.0
North Sydney (NSW)	Billy Hughes	NAT	08.2 v Const.
New England (NSW)	Victor Thompson	CP	08.5
Darling Downs (Qld)	Littleton Groom	NAT	08.6
Perth (WA)	Edward Mann	NAT	08.9
Moreton (Qld)	Josiah Francis	NAT	09.5
Safe
Wide Bay (Qld)	Edward Corser	NAT	10.5
Eden-Monaro (NSW)	Austin Chapman	NAT	11.1
Wilmot (Tas)	Llewellyn Atkinson	CP	11.2
Robertson (NSW)	Sydney Gardner	NAT	11.8
Parkes (NSW)	Charles Marr	NAT	11.8
Wentworth (NSW)	Walter Marks	NAT	11.9
Gippsland (Vic)	Thomas Paterson	CP	12.9 v NAT
Indi (Vic)	Robert Cook	CP	13.2
Lilley (Qld)	George Mackay	NAT	15.2 v IND
Parramatta (NSW)	Eric Bowden	NAT	15.4
Cowper (NSW)	Earle Page	CP	17.3 v NAT
Very safe
Echuca (Vic)	William Hill	CP	20.3 v NAT
Wimmera (Vic)	Percy Stewart	CP	21.2 v IND
Forrest (WA)	John Prowse	CP	29.5 v NAT
Martin (NSW)	Herbert Pratten	NAT	unopposed
Swan (WA)	Henry Gregory	CP	unopposed
Warringah (NSW)	Granville Ryrie	NAT	unopposed

Non-government seats
Australian Labor Party and Liberal Party
Marginal
Gwydir (NSW)	Lou Cunningham	ALP	00.1 v CP
Northern Territory (NT)	H. G. Nelson	ALP	00.4 v IND
Denison (Tas)	David O'Keefe	ALP	00.4
Kooyong (Vic)	John Latham	LIB	00.6 v NAT
Wannon (Vic)	John McNeill	ALP	00.8
Ballaarat (Vic)	Charles McGrath	ALP	01.7
Barker (SA)	Malcolm Cameron	LIB	02.3 v ALP
Capricornia (Qld)	Frank Forde	ALP	02.5
Batman (Vic)	Frank Brennan	ALP	03.3
Adelaide (SA)	George Edwin Yates	ALP	03.6 v LIB
Grey (SA)	Andrew Lacey	ALP	03.7
Werriwa (NSW)	Bert Lazzarini	ALP	03.9
Boothby (SA)	Jack Duncan-Hughes	LIB	04.7 v ALP
Hume (NSW)	Parker Moloney	ALP	04.9
Wakefield (SA)	Richard Foster	LIB	05.3 v ALP
Fairly safe
Kalgoorlie (WA)	Albert Green	ALP	07.4
Barton (NSW)	Frederick McDonald	ALP	07.6
Angas (SA)	Moses Gabb	ALP	08.0 v LIB
Reid (NSW)	Percy Coleman	ALP	08.6
East Sydney (NSW)	John West	ALP	09.1
Safe
Kennedy (Qld)	Charles McDonald	ALP	11.6
South Sydney (NSW)	Edward Riley	ALP	11.7
Maribyrnong (Vic)	James Fenton	ALP	13.2
Darling (NSW)	Arthur Blakeley	ALP	15.1
Hindmarsh (SA)	Norman Makin	ALP	18.6
Newcastle (NSW)	David Watkins	ALP	19.4
Very safe
Bourke (Vic)	Frank Anstey	ALP	20.1
Dalley (NSW)	William Mahony	ALP	20.9
Melbourne Ports (Vic)	James Mathews	ALP	23.1
Cook (NSW)	Edward Charles Riley	ALP	24.9
West Sydney (NSW)	William Lambert	ALP	25.4 v IND
Melbourne (Vic)	William Maloney	ALP	27.2
Yarra (Vic)	James Scullin	ALP	28.0
Balaclava (Vic)	William Watt	LIB	unopposed
Hunter (NSW)	Matthew Charlton	ALP	unopposed
Independents
Fremantle (WA)	William Watson	IND	06.9 v ALP

== See also ==
- Candidates of the 1922 Australian federal election
- Members of the Australian House of Representatives, 1922–1925
- Members of the Australian Senate, 1923–1926
