= Candidates of the 1925 Australian federal election =

This article provides information on candidates who stood for the 1925 Australian federal election. The election was held on 14 November 1925.

== By-elections, appointments and defections ==
=== By-elections and appointments ===
- On 12 September 1923, John Hayes (Nationalist) was appointed as a Tasmanian Senator to succeed Thomas Bakhap (Nationalist).
- On 17 October 1923, Walter Massy-Greene (Nationalist) was appointed as a New South Wales Senator to succeed Edward Millen (Nationalist).
- On 22 July 1924, Joseph Hannan (Labor) was appointed as a Victorian Senator to succeed Stephen Barker (Labor).
- On 10 November 1924, Jack Power (Labor) appointed as a New South Wales Senator to succeed Allan McDougall (Labor).
- On 1 April 1925, William Gibbs (Labor) was appointed as a New South Wales Senator succeed Jack Power (Labor).
- On 29 July 1925, Charles Grant (Nationalist) was appointed as a Tasmanian Senator to succeed George Foster (Nationalist).
- On 25 August 1925, William Plain (Nationalist) was appointed as a Victorian Senator to succeed Edward Russell (Nationalist).
- On 13 November 1925, the day before the election, Charles McDonald (Labor, Kennedy) died, leaving his seat to be won unopposed by the Nationalist candidate.
- Subsequent to the election, but prior to the new Senate taking its place:
  - On 18 December 1925, Sir Henry Barwell (Nationalist) was appointed as a South Australian Senator to replace James O'Loghlin (Labor).
  - On 24 February 1926, Alexander McLachlan (Nationalist was appointed as a South Australian Senator to replace Benjamin Benny (Nationalist).

=== Defections ===
- After Prime Minister Billy Hughes's resignation in 1923, the five Liberal Party members – Malcolm Cameron (Barker), Jack Duncan-Hughes (Boothby), Richard Foster (Wakefield), John Latham (Kooyong) and William Watt (Balaclava) – rejoined the Nationalist Party.
- In 1925, Country MP Percy Stewart (Wimmera) resigned from the party. He contested his seat as an Independent Country candidate.

== Retiring Members and Senators ==
=== Labor ===
- Senator William Gibbs (NSW)

=== Nationalist ===
- Fred Bamford MP (Herbert, Qld)
- Frederick Francis MP (Henty, Vic)
- Senator Benjamin Benny (SA) (see also above)
- Senator Edmund Drake-Brockman (WA)

=== Country ===
- Joshua Whitsitt MP (Darwin, Tas)

== House of Representatives ==
Sitting members at the time of the election are shown in bold text. Successful candidates are highlighted in the relevant colour. Where there is possible confusion, an asterisk (*) is also used.

=== New South Wales ===
Electorate	Held by	Labor candidate	Coalition candidate	Other candidates
Barton	Labor	**Frederick McDonald**	Thomas Ley (Nat)	
Calare	Nationalist	William Webster	**Sir Neville Howse** (Nat)	William Southwick (Ind)
Cook	Labor	**Edward Riley**	Arthur Philip (Nat)	
Cowper	Country	Lockhart Easton	**Earle Page** (CP)	
Dalley	Labor	**William Mahony**	James Thomson (Nat)	
Darling	Labor	**Arthur Blakeley**	John Dowling (Nat)	
East Sydney	Labor	**John West**	Richard Orchard (Nat)	
Eden-Monaro	Nationalist	Charles Morgan	**Sir Austin Chapman** (Nat)	
Gwydir	Labor	**Lou Cunningham**	Aubrey Abbott* (CP); Joseph McGowan (Nat)	
Hume	Labor	**Parker Moloney**	Angus Campbell (Nat); Victor Miers (CP)	
Hunter	Labor	**Matthew Charlton**	Alfred Horsfall (Nat)	
Lang	Nationalist	George Smith	**Sir Elliot Johnson** (Nat)	
Macquarie	Nationalist	Ben Chifley	**Arthur Manning** (Nat)	
Martin	Nationalist	Henry McDicken	**Herbert Pratten** (Nat)	
New England	Country	John Heiss	**Victor Thompson** (CP)	
Newcastle	Labor	**David Watkins**	George Waller (Nat)	
North Sydney	Nationalist	Joe Lamaro	**Billy Hughes** (Nat)	
Parkes	Nationalist	William Dunn	**Charles Marr** (Nat)	
Parramatta	Nationalist	James Stone	**Eric Bowden** (Nat)	
Reid	Labor	**Percy Coleman**	Percy Shortland (Nat)	
Richmond	Country	Harry Green	**Roland Green*** (CP); Joseph Greene (Nat); John Williams (CP)	
Riverina	Country	Essell Hoad	**William Killen** (CP)	
Robertson	Nationalist	Gordon Cross	**Sydney Gardner** (Nat)	
South Sydney	Labor	**Edward Riley**	George Baker (Nat)	
Warringah	Nationalist	Thomas Conway	**Sir Granville Ryrie** (Nat)	
Wentworth	Nationalist	William Crick	**Walter Marks** (Nat)	
Werriwa	Labor	**Bert Lazzarini**	Sir Charles Rosenthal (Nat)	
West Sydney	Labor	**William Lambert**	Lindsay Thompson (Nat)	

=== Northern Territory ===
Electorate	Held by	Labor candidate	Nationalist candidate
Northern Territory	Labor	**Harold Nelson**	Charles Story

=== Queensland ===
Electorate	Held by	Labor candidate	Coalition candidate	Other candidates
Brisbane	Nationalist	John Fihelly	**Donald Cameron** (Nat)	Herbert Collie (Ind Lab)
Capricornia	Labor	**Frank Forde**	William Doherty (CP)	
Darling Downs	Nationalist	Duncan McInnes	**Sir Littleton Groom** (Nat)	
Herbert	Nationalist	Ted Theodore	Lewis Nott (Nat)	
Kennedy	Labor		Grosvenor Francis (Nat)	
Lilley	Nationalist	John Mattingley	**George Mackay** (Nat)	
Maranoa	Country	Samuel Brassington	**James Hunter** (CP)	
Moreton	Nationalist	Horace Lee	**Josiah Francis** (Nat)	
Oxley	Nationalist	James Sharpe	**James Bayley** (Nat)	
Wide Bay	Nationalist	Andrew Thompson	**Edward Corser** (Nat)	

=== South Australia ===
Electorate	Held by	Labor candidate	Nationalist candidate
Adelaide	Labor	**George Edwin Yates**	George McLeay
Angas	Labor	**Moses Gabb**	Walter Parsons
Barker	Liberal	Alwyn Roberts	**Malcolm Cameron**
Boothby	Liberal	Harry Kneebone	**Jack Duncan-Hughes**
Grey	Labor	**Andrew Lacey**	John Lyons
Hindmarsh	Labor	**Norman Makin**	John Verran
Wakefield	Liberal	Even George	**Richard Foster**

=== Tasmania ===
Electorate	Held by	Labor candidate	Nationalist candidate	Country candidate
Bass	Nationalist	Harold Holmes; John Swain	**Syd Jackson**	
Darwin	Country	Henry Lane	George Bell*; Hubert Nichols	
Denison	Labor	**David O'Keefe**	Sir John Gellibrand	
Franklin	Nationalist	Eric Ogilvie; Douglas Thompson	William McWilliams; **Alfred Seabrook***	
Wilmot	Country	Jens Jensen	Percy Best; Atherfield Newman	**Llewellyn Atkinson**

=== Victoria ===
Electorate	Held by	Labor candidate	Coalition candidate	Other candidates
Balaclava	Liberal	John McKellar	**William Watt** (Nat)	
Ballaarat	Labor	**Charles McGrath**	Thomas Ryan (Nat)	
Batman	Labor	**Frank Brennan**	Samuel Dennis (Nat)	
Bendigo	Nationalist	Thomas Jude	**Geoffry Hurry** (Nat)	
Bourke	Labor	**Frank Anstey**	Edward Price (Nat)	
Corangamite	Country	William Nicol	**William Gibson** (CP)	
Corio	Nationalist	Peter Randles	**John Lister** (Nat)	
Echuca	Country	Patrick O'Hanlon	**William Hill** (CP)	
Fawkner	Nationalist	Alfred Foster	**George Maxwell** (Nat)	
Flinders	Nationalist	Roy Beardsworth	**Stanley Bruce** (Nat)	
Gippsland	Country	James Bermingham	**Thomas Paterson** (CP)	George Wise (Ind Nat)
Henty	Nationalist	Edward Stewart	Henry Gullett (Nat)	Donald Mackinnon (Ind Nat)
Indi	Country	David Black	**Robert Cook** (CP)	
Kooyong	Liberal	Lionel Batten	**John Latham** (Nat)	
Maribyrnong	Labor	**James Fenton**	Thomas White (Nat)	
Melbourne	Labor	**William Maloney**	William Hendry (Nat)	
Melbourne Ports	Labor	**James Mathews**	Frank Wilcher (Nat)	
Wannon	Labor	**John McNeill**	David Anderson (CP); Arthur Rodgers* (Nat)	
Wimmera	Country			Lucas de Garis (Ind); **Percy Stewart*** (Ind CP)
Yarra	Labor	**James Scullin**	Marcus Towler (Nat)	

=== Western Australia ===
Electorate	Held by	Labor candidate	Coalition candidate	Independent candidate(s)
Forrest	Country	Thomas Lowry	**John Prowse** (CP)	
Fremantle	Independent	John Curtin		**William Watson**
Kalgoorlie	Labor	**Albert Green**	John Mullany (Nat)	
Perth	Nationalist	Dick Lane	**Edward Mann** (Nat)	
Swan	Country	Ben Davies	**Henry Gregory** (CP)	

== Senate ==
Sitting Senators are shown in bold text. Tickets that elected at least one Senator are highlighted in the relevant colour. Successful candidates are identified by an asterisk (*).

=== New South Wales ===
Five seats were up for election. Two of these were for short-term vacancies: one caused by Nationalist Senator Edward Millen's death, which had been filled in the interim by Nationalist Walter Massy-Greene; and the other caused by Labor Senator Allan McDougall's death, which had been filled first by Jack Power and then by William Gibbs, both members of the Labor Party. The Labor Party was defending two seats. The Nationalist Party was defending three seats. Labor Senator John Grant was not up for re-election.

Labor candidates	Coalition candidates
John Dooley; James Dunn; John Eldridge; **Albert Gardiner**; Donald Grant	Percy Abbott* (CP); **Charles Cox*** (Nat); **Walter Duncan*** (Nat); **Walter Massy-Greene*** (Nat); Josiah Thomas* (Nat)

=== Queensland ===
Three seats were up for election. The Nationalist Party was defending three seats. Nationalist Senators Thomas Crawford, Harry Foll and Matthew Reid were not up for re-election.

Labor candidates	Nationalist candidates
Harald Jensen; Jim Riordan; Harry Turley	**Thomas Givens***; **Sir William Glasgow***; **William Thompson***

=== South Australia ===
Three seats were up for election. The Nationalist Party was defending three seats. Labor Senators Bert Hoare, Charles McHugh and James O'Loghlin were not up for re-election.

Labor candidates	Coalition candidates
John Daly; Herbert George; Frank Lundie	John Chapman* (CP); Alexander McLachlan* (Nat); **John Newland*** (Nat); **Victor Wilson** (Nat)

=== Tasmania ===
Four seats were up for election. One of these was a short-term vacancy caused by Nationalist Senator Thomas Bakhap's death; this had been filled in the interim by Nationalist John Hayes. The Nationalist Party was defending four seats. Labor Senator James Ogden and Nationalist Senator Herbert Hays were not up for re-election.

Labor candidates	Nationalist candidates
Richard Crouch; Alfred Higgins; William Lloyd; James McDonald; Thomas Wilson	John Earle; **Charles Grant**; **John Hayes***; **John Millen***; John Ockerby; **Herbert Payne***; Burford Sampson*

=== Victoria ===
Four seats were up for election. One of these was a short-term vacancy caused by Labor Senator Stephen Barker's death; this had been filled in the interim by Labor's Joseph Hannan. The Nationalist Party was defending three seats. The Labor Party was defending one seat. Labor Senators John Barnes and Edward Findley were not up for re-election.

Labor candidates	Coalition candidates
Albert Blakey; **Joseph Hannan**; Jack Holloway; Richard Keane	David Andrew* (CP); **Harold Elliott*** (Nat); **James Guthrie*** (Nat); **William Plain*** (Nat)

=== Western Australia ===
Three seats were up for election. The Nationalist Party was defending three seats. Labor Senators Charles Graham and Ted Needham and Nationalist Senator Walter Kingsmill were not up for re-election.

Labor candidates	Coalition candidates	Independent candidates
Ernest Barker; Andrew Clementson; James Kenneally	William Carroll* (CP); **Patrick Lynch*** (Nat); **George Pearce*** (Nat)	James Crawford

== See also ==
- 1925 Australian federal election
- Members of the Australian House of Representatives, 1922–1925
- Members of the Australian House of Representatives, 1925–1928
- Members of the Australian Senate, 1923–1926
- Members of the Australian Senate, 1926–1929
- List of political parties in Australia
