= 1925 Australian House of Representatives election =

Australian federal election, 14 November 1925 House of Representatives << 1922–1928 >>
Enrolled voters	3,302,016				
Votes cast	2,987,200		Turnout	91.39	+32.03
Informal votes	70,562		Informal	2.36	–2.15
Summary of votes by party
Party	Primary votes	%	Swing	Seats	Change
Labor	1,313,627	45.04%	+2.74%	23	– 6
Nationalist	1,238,397	42.46%	+7.23%	37	+ 11
Country	313,363	10.74%	–1.82%	13	– 1
Independent	51,251	1.76%	–2.80%	2	+ 1
Total	2,916,638			75	

This is a list of electoral division results for the Australian 1925 federal election.

== New South Wales ==
=== Barton ===
1925 Australian federal election: Barton
Party	Candidate	Votes	%	±%
Nationalist	Thomas Ley	26,172	51.0	+8.6
Labor	Frederick McDonald	25,112	49.0	−8.6
Total formal votes		51,284	98.8	
Informal votes		632	1.2	
Turnout		51,916	95.4	
Nationalist gain from Labor		Swing	+8.6	

=== Calare ===
1925 Australian federal election: Calare
Party	Candidate	Votes	%	±%
Nationalist	Sir Neville Howse	21,645	59.1	+24.5
Labor	William Webster	14,499	39.6	−2.4
Independent	William Southwick	461	1.3	+1.3
Total formal votes		36,605	97.8	
Informal votes		830	2.2	
Turnout		37,435	91.9	
Two-party-preferred result
Nationalist	Sir Neville Howse		59.8	+4.5
Labor	William Webster		40.2	−4.5
Nationalist hold		Swing	+4.5	

=== Cook ===
1925 Australian federal election: Cook
Party	Candidate	Votes	%	±%
Labor	Edward Riley	25,764	67.8	+2.8
Nationalist	Arthur Philip	12,229	32.2	+11.1
Total formal votes		37,993	98.0	
Informal votes		764	2.0	
Turnout		38,757	92.2	
Labor hold		Swing	−6.9	

=== Cowper ===
1925 Australian federal election: Cowper
Party	Candidate	Votes	%	±%
Country	Earle Page	24,571	70.0	+2.7
Labor	Lockhart Easton	10,510	30.0	+30.0
Total formal votes		35,081	98.5	
Informal votes		544	1.5	
Turnout		35,625	92.8	
Country hold		Swing	+2.7	

=== Dalley ===
1925 Australian federal election: Dalley
Party	Candidate	Votes	%	±%
Labor	William Mahony	24,455	64.1	−2.6
Nationalist	James Thomson	13,702	35.9	+11.0
Total formal votes		38,157	97.9	
Informal votes		801	2.1	
Turnout		38,958	92.0	
Labor hold		Swing	−8.9	

=== Darling ===
1925 Australian federal election: Darling
Party	Candidate	Votes	%	±%
Labor	Arthur Blakeley	20,965	65.5	+20.2
Nationalist	John Dowling	11,043	34.5	+2.0
Total formal votes		32,008	97.6	
Informal votes		777	2.4	
Turnout		32,785	80.8	
Labor hold		Swing	+0.4	

=== East Sydney ===
1925 Australian federal election: East Sydney
Party	Candidate	Votes	%	±%
Labor	John West	18,822	53.8	−5.3
Nationalist	Richard Orchard	16,169	46.2	+5.3
Total formal votes		34,991	98.0	
Informal votes		729	2.0	
Turnout		35,720	85.6	
Labor hold		Swing	−5.3	

=== Eden-Monaro ===
1925 Australian federal election: Eden-Monaro
Party	Candidate	Votes	%	±%
Nationalist	Austin Chapman	23,371	64.6	+3.5
Labor	Charles Morgan	12,828	35.4	−3.5
Total formal votes		36,199	98.3	
Informal votes		610	1.7	
Turnout		36,809	91.4	
Nationalist hold		Swing	+3.5	

=== Gwydir ===
1925 Australian federal election: Gwydir
Party	Candidate	Votes	%	±%
Labor	Lou Cunningham	15,531	45.5	−0.8
Country	Aubrey Abbott	10,509	30.8	−5.6
Nationalist	Joseph McGowan	8,080	23.7	+6.4
Total formal votes		34,120	97.5	
Informal votes		881	2.5	
Turnout		35,001	88.1	
Two-party-preferred result
Country	Aubrey Abbott	18,124	53.1	+3.2
Labor	Lou Cunningham	15,996	46.9	−3.2
Country gain from Labor		Swing	+3.2	

=== Hume ===
1925 Australian federal election: Hume
Party	Candidate	Votes	%	±%
Labor	Parker Moloney	18,860	50.4	−2.5
Nationalist	Angus Campbell	12,529	33.5	+5.9
Country	Victor Miers	6,011	16.1	−3.4
Total formal votes		37,400	98.4	
Informal votes		605	1.6	
Turnout		38,005	90.7	
Two-party-preferred result
Labor	Parker Moloney		52.0	−2.9
Nationalist	Angus Campbell		48.0	+2.9
Labor hold		Swing	−2.9	

=== Hunter ===
1925 Australian federal election: Hunter
Party	Candidate	Votes	%	±%
Labor	Matthew Charlton	31,244	71.3	−28.7
Nationalist	Alfred Horsfall	12,550	28.7	+28.7
Total formal votes		43,794	98.2	
Informal votes		791	1.8	
Turnout		44,585	92.2	
Labor hold		Swing	−28.7	

=== Lang ===
1925 Australian federal election: Lang
Party	Candidate	Votes	%	±%
Nationalist	Sir Elliot Johnson	22,756	55.9	+6.6
Labor	George Smith	17,941	44.1	+2.4
Total formal votes		40,697	98.5	
Informal votes		524	1.5	
Turnout		41,321	85.7	
Nationalist hold		Swing	+1.5	

=== Macquarie ===
1925 Australian federal election: Macquarie
Party	Candidate	Votes	%	±%
Nationalist	Arthur Manning	18,456	51.3	+7.0
Labor	Ben Chifley	17,553	48.7	+0.7
Total formal votes		36,009	98.4	
Informal votes		588	1.6	
Turnout		36,597	92.4	
Nationalist hold		Swing	+1.1	

=== Martin ===
1925 Australian federal election: Martin
Party	Candidate	Votes	%	±%
Nationalist	Herbert Pratten	31,730	64.76	+64.76
Labor	Henry McDicken	17,263	35.24	+35.24
Total formal votes		48,993	98.03	
Informal votes		986	1.97	
Turnout		49,979	93.84	
Nationalist hold		Swing	−35.24	

=== New England ===
1925 Australian federal election: New England
Party	Candidate	Votes	%	±%
Country	Victor Thompson	20,896	58.5	+22.9
Labor	John Heiss	14,824	41.5	+6.1
Total formal votes		35,720	97.3	
Informal votes		987	2.7	
Turnout		36,707	89.1	
Country hold		Swing	+0.0	

=== Newcastle ===
1925 Australian federal election: Newcastle
Party	Candidate	Votes	%	±%
Labor	David Watkins	27,291	62.5	+7.9
Nationalist	George Waller	16,378	37.5	+12.9
Total formal votes		43,669	98.2	
Informal votes		805	1.8	
Turnout		44,474	92.0	
Labor hold		Swing	−6.9	

=== North Sydney ===
1925 Australian federal election: North Sydney
Party	Candidate	Votes	%	±%
Nationalist	Billy Hughes	33,855	71.5	+13.3
Labor	Joe Lamaro	13,500	28.5	+28.5
Total formal votes		47,355	98.8	
Informal votes		581	1.2	
Turnout		47,936	92.9	
Nationalist hold		Swing	+13.3	

=== Parkes ===
1925 Australian federal election: Parkes
Party	Candidate	Votes	%	±%
Nationalist	Charles Marr	28,320	62.8	+1.0
Labor	William Dunn	16,808	37.2	−1.0
Total formal votes		45,128	98.3	
Informal votes		788	1.7	
Turnout		45,916	90.2	
Nationalist hold		Swing	+1.0	

=== Parramatta ===
1925 Australian federal election: Parramatta
Party	Candidate	Votes	%	±%
Nationalist	Eric Bowden	30,309	65.7	+0.3
Labor	James Stone	15,809	34.3	−0.3
Total formal votes		46,118	98.1	
Informal votes		896	1.9	
Turnout		47,014	91.9	
Nationalist hold		Swing	+0.3	

=== Reid ===
1925 Australian federal election: Reid
Party	Candidate	Votes	%	±%
Labor	Percy Coleman	37,027	54.7	+0.2
Nationalist	Percy Shortland	22,343	45.3	+5.2
Total formal votes		49,370	98.1	
Informal votes		944	1.9	
Turnout		50,314	92.6	
Labor hold		Swing	−3.9	

=== Richmond ===
1925 Australian federal election: Richmond
Party	Candidate	Votes	%	±%
Country	Roland Green	11,755	31.8	+5.2
Labor	Harry Green	11,257	30.4	+30.4
Country	John Williams	7,051	19.1	+19.1
Nationalist	Joseph Greene	6,935	18.7	−26.1
Total formal votes		36,998	97.2	
Informal votes		1,057	2.8	
Turnout		38,055	88.3	
Two-party-preferred result
Country	Roland Green	25,056	67.7	+14.4
Labor	Harry Green	11,942	32.3	+32.3
Country hold		Swing	+14.4	

=== Riverina ===
1925 Australian federal election: Riverina
Party	Candidate	Votes	%	±%
Country	William Killen	20,490	54.3	+16.2
Labor	Essell Hoad	17,249	45.7	+4.6
Total formal votes		37,739	97.9	
Informal votes		794	2.1	
Turnout		38,533	86.1	
Country hold		Swing	+0.0	

=== Robertson ===
1925 Australian federal election: Robertson
Party	Candidate	Votes	%	±%
Nationalist	Sydney Gardner	22,777	62.6	+24.6
Labor	Gordon Cross	13,586	37.4	+2.8
Total formal votes		36,363	97.6	
Informal votes		899	2.4	
Turnout		37,262	92.5	
Nationalist hold		Swing	+0.8	

=== South Sydney ===
1925 Australian federal election: South Sydney
Party	Candidate	Votes	%	±%
Labor	Edward Riley	22,393	51.1	−7.8
Nationalist	George Baker	21,411	48.9	+12.4
Total formal votes		43,804	98.6	
Informal votes		622	1.4	
Turnout		44,426	86.3	
Labor hold		Swing	−10.6	

=== Warringah ===
1925 Australian federal election: Warringah
Party	Candidate	Votes	%	±%
Nationalist	Sir Granville Ryrie	34,132	80.1	−19.9
Labor	Thomas Conway	8,455	19.9	+19.9
Total formal votes		42,587	98.7	
Informal votes		546	1.3	
Turnout		43,133	92.2	
Nationalist hold		Swing	−19.9	

=== Wentworth ===
1925 Australian federal election: Wentworth
Party	Candidate	Votes	%	±%
Nationalist	Walter Marks	27,945	64.4	+14.7
Labor	William Crick	15,436	35.6	+3.0
Total formal votes		43,381	98.2	
Informal votes		790	1.8	
Turnout		44,171	87.7	
Nationalist hold		Swing	+2.5	

=== Werriwa ===
1925 Australian federal election: Werriwa
Party	Candidate	Votes	%	±%
Labor	Bert Lazzarini	20,799	53.7	+0.6
Nationalist	Sir Charles Rosenthal	17,904	46.3	+8.3
Total formal votes		38,703	98.4	
Informal votes		633	1.6	
Turnout		39,336	92.2	
Labor hold		Swing	−0.2	

=== West Sydney ===
1925 Australian federal election: West Sydney
Party	Candidate	Votes	%	±%
Labor	William Lambert	24,604	74.0	+0.1
Nationalist	Lindsay Thompson	8,634	26.0	+26.0
Total formal votes		33,238	97.4	
Informal votes		885	2.6	
Turnout		34,123	87.0	
Labor hold		Swing	−1.4	

== Victoria ==
=== Balaclava ===
1925 Australian federal election: Balaclava
Party	Candidate	Votes	%	±%
Nationalist	William Watt	35,458	69.7	−30.3
Labor	John McKellar	15,379	30.3	+30.3
Total formal votes		50,837	98.7	
Informal votes		654	1.3	
Turnout		51,491	95.3	
Nationalist gain from Liberal		Swing	−30.3	

=== Ballaarat ===
1925 Australian federal election: Ballaarat
Party	Candidate	Votes	%	±%
Labor	Charles McGrath	19,121	51.3	+0.9
Nationalist	Thomas Ryan	18,147	48.7	+12.9
Total formal votes		37,268	99.1	
Informal votes		341	0.9	
Turnout		37,609	95.2	
Labor hold		Swing	−0.4	

=== Batman ===
1925 Australian federal election: Batman
Party	Candidate	Votes	%	±%
Labor	Frank Brennan	32,427	59.0	+8.0
Nationalist	Samuel Dennis	22,513	41.0	+18.1
Total formal votes		54,940	98.6	
Informal votes		744	1.4	
Turnout		55,684	92.9	
Labor hold		Swing	+5.7	

=== Bendigo ===
1925 Australian federal election: Bendigo
Party	Candidate	Votes	%	±%
Nationalist	Geoffry Hurry	20,154	53.5	+21.9
Labor	Thomas Jude	17,507	46.5	+3.4
Total formal votes		37,661	98.9	
Informal votes		400	1.1	
Turnout		38,061	94.6	
Nationalist hold		Swing	+1.8	

=== Bourke ===
1925 Australian federal election: Bourke
Party	Candidate	Votes	%	±%
Labor	Frank Anstey	32,325	62.5	−7.6
Nationalist	Edward Price	19,399	37.5	+7.6
Total formal votes		51,724	98.7	
Informal votes		703	1.3	
Turnout		52,427	94.7	
Labor hold		Swing	−7.6	

=== Corangamite ===
1925 Australian federal election: Corangamite
Party	Candidate	Votes	%	±%
Country	William Gibson	21,557	55.5	+27.0
Labor	William Nicol	17,297	44.5	+0.0
Total formal votes		38,854	98.7	
Informal votes		502	1.3	
Turnout		39,356	92.2	
Country hold		Swing	+1.6	

=== Corio ===
1925 Australian federal election: Corio
Party	Candidate	Votes	%	±%
Nationalist	John Lister	24,775	56.7	+5.9
Labor	Peter Randles	18,915	43.3	−5.9
Total formal votes		43,690	98.8	
Informal votes		539	1.2	
Turnout		44,229	92.7	
Nationalist hold		Swing	+5.9	

=== Echuca ===
1925 Australian federal election: Echuca
Party	Candidate	Votes	%	±%
Country	William Hill	25,321	65.3	−5.0
Labor	Patrick O'Hanlon	13,451	34.7	+34.7
Total formal votes		38,772	98.5	
Informal votes		576	1.5	
Turnout		39,348	93.4	
Country hold		Swing	−5.0	

=== Fawkner ===
1925 Australian federal election: Fawkner
Party	Candidate	Votes	%	±%
Nationalist	George Maxwell	26,028	59.4	+7.2
Labor	Alfred Foster	17,809	40.6	−0.8
Total formal votes		43,837	98.8	
Informal votes		543	1.2	
Turnout		44,380	92.7	
Nationalist hold		Swing	+1.4	

=== Flinders ===
1925 Australian federal election: Flinders
Party	Candidate	Votes	%	±%
Nationalist	Stanley Bruce	33,173	62.7	+7.1
Labor	Roy Beardsworth	19,173	37.3	+37.3
Total formal votes		52,921	98.4	
Informal votes		868	1.6	
Turnout		53,789	93.4	
Nationalist hold		Swing	+7.1	

=== Gippsland ===
1925 Australian federal election: Gippsland
Party	Candidate	Votes	%	±%
Country	Thomas Paterson	18,423	44.6	+5.2
Labor	James Bermingham	13,417	32.5	+5.1
Ind. Nationalist	George Wise	9,428	22.8	+22.8
Total formal votes		41,268	97.1	
Informal votes		1,240	2.9	
Turnout		42,508	93.9	
Two-party-preferred result
Country	Thomas Paterson	26,055	63.1	+0.2
Labor	James Bermingham	15,213	36.9	+36.9
Country hold		Swing	+0.2	

=== Henty ===
1925 Australian federal election: Henty
Party	Candidate	Votes	%	±%
Nationalist	Henry Gullett	31,077	51.5	−28.7
Labor	Edward Stewart	17,930	29.7	+9.9
Ind. Nationalist	Donald Mackinnon	11,318	18.8	+18.8
Total formal votes		60,325	98.5	
Informal votes		909	1.5	
Turnout		61,234	94.6	
Two-party-preferred result
Nationalist	Henry Gullett		60.9	−39.1
Labor	Edward Stewart		39.1	+39.1
Nationalist hold		Swing	−39.1	

=== Indi ===
1925 Australian federal election: Indi
Party	Candidate	Votes	%	±%
Country	Robert Cook	21,161	56.7	+17.4
Labor	David Black	16,153	43.3	+8.3
Total formal votes		37,314	98.5	
Informal votes		550	1.5	
Turnout		37,864	93.7	
Country hold		Swing	−6.5	

=== Kooyong ===
1925 Australian federal election: Kooyong
Party	Candidate	Votes	%	±%
Nationalist	John Latham	36,954	67.7	+20.3
Labor	Lionel Batten	17,664	32.3	+13.5
Total formal votes		54,618	98.7	
Informal votes		745	1.3	
Turnout		55,363	94.5	
Nationalist gain from Liberal		Swing	+18.3	

=== Maribyrnong ===
1925 Australian federal election: Maribyrnong
Party	Candidate	Votes	%	±%
Labor	James Fenton	28,621	59.5	−3.7
Nationalist	Thomas White	19,483	40.5	+3.7
Total formal votes		48,104	99.0	
Informal votes		496	1.0	
Turnout		48,600	93.6	
Labor hold		Swing	−3.7	

=== Melbourne ===
1925 Australian federal election: Melbourne
Party	Candidate	Votes	%	±%
Labor	William Maloney	26,607	67.0	−10.2
Nationalist	William Hendry	13,082	33.0	+10.2
Total formal votes		39,689	97.7	
Informal votes		921	2.3	
Turnout		40,610	87.2	
Labor hold		Swing	−10.2	

=== Melbourne Ports ===
1925 Australian federal election: Melbourne Ports
Party	Candidate	Votes	%	±%
Labor	James Mathews	29,416	67.7	−5.4
Nationalist	Frank Wilcher	14,035	32.3	+5.4
Total formal votes		43,451	98.2	
Informal votes		792	1.8	
Turnout		44,243	89.7	
Labor hold		Swing	−5.4	

=== Wannon ===
1925 Australian federal election: Wannon
Party	Candidate	Votes	%	±%
Nationalist	Arthur Rodgers	16,678	42.5	+8.8
Labor	John McNeill	16,610	42.3	+1.2
Country	David Anderson	5,995	15.3	−9.9
Total formal votes		39,283	98.4	
Informal votes		640	1.6	
Turnout		39,923	95.1	
Two-party-preferred result
Nationalist	Arthur Rodgers	21,218	54.0	+4.8
Labor	John McNeill	18,065	46.0	−4.8
Nationalist gain from Labor		Swing	+4.8	

=== Wimmera ===
1925 Australian federal election: Wimmera
Party	Candidate	Votes	%	±%
Independent Country	Percy Stewart	32,128	77.8	+77.8
Independent	Lucas de Garis	9,154	22.2	+22.2
Total formal votes		41,282	96.9	
Informal votes		1,312	3.1	
Turnout		42,594	87.7	
Independent Country gain from Country		Swing	+77.8	

=== Yarra ===
1925 Australian federal election: Yarra
Party	Candidate	Votes	%	±%
Labor	James Scullin	31,451	74.8	−3.2
Nationalist	Marcus Towler	10,610	25.2	+3.2
Total formal votes		42,061	97.8	
Informal votes		964	2.2	
Turnout		43,025	91.8	
Labor hold		Swing	−3.2	

== Queensland ==
=== Brisbane ===
1925 Australian federal election: Brisbane
Party	Candidate	Votes	%	±%
Nationalist	Donald Cameron	20,902	55.1	+3.1
Labor	John Fihelly	16,711	44.1	−3.9
Independent Labor	Herbert Collie	322	0.8	+0.8
Total formal votes		37,935	97.3	
Informal votes		1,035	2.7	
Turnout		38,970	90.8	
Two-party-preferred result
Nationalist	Donald Cameron		55.5	+3.5
Labor	John Fihelly		44.5	−3.5
Nationalist hold		Swing	+3.5	

=== Capricornia ===
1925 Australian federal election: Capricornia
Party	Candidate	Votes	%	±%
Labor	Frank Forde	22,524	51.9	+0.0
Country	William Doherty	20,846	48.1	+41.9
Total formal votes		543,370	97.2	
Informal votes		1,261	2.8	
Turnout		44,631	91.1	
Labor hold		Swing	−0.6	

=== Darling Downs ===
1925 Australian federal election: Darling Downs
Party	Candidate	Votes	%	±%
Nationalist	Sir Littleton Groom	23,648	63.1	+4.5
Labor	Duncan McInnes	13,803	36.9	−4.5
Total formal votes		37,451	97.2	
Informal votes		1,063	2.8	
Turnout		38,514	93.1	
Nationalist hold		Swing	+4.5	

=== Herbert ===
1925 Australian federal election: Herbert
Party	Candidate	Votes	%	±%
Nationalist	Lewis Nott	22,385	50.3	−1.4
Labor	Ted Theodore	22,117	49.7	+1.4
Total formal votes		44,502	95.3	
Informal votes		2,188	4.7	
Turnout		46,690	90.2	
Nationalist hold		Swing	−1.4	

=== Kennedy ===
1925 Australian federal election: Kennedy
Party	Candidate	Votes	%	±%
Nationalist	Grosvenor Francis	unopposed		
Nationalist gain from Labor		Swing		

=== Lilley ===
1925 Australian federal election: Lilley
Party	Candidate	Votes	%	±%
Nationalist	George Mackay	27,966	64.7	−0.5
Labor	John Mattingley	15,228	35.3	+35.3
Total formal votes		43,194	96.8	
Informal votes		1,445	3.2	
Turnout		44,639	93.4	
Nationalist hold		Swing	−0.5	

=== Maranoa ===
1925 Australian federal election: Maranoa
Party	Candidate	Votes	%	±%
Country	James Hunter	14,463	52.6	−1.8
Labor	Samuel Brassington	13,024	47.4	+1.8
Total formal votes		27,487	97.1	
Informal votes		824	2.9	
Turnout		28,311	83.8	
Country hold		Swing	−1.8	

=== Moreton ===
1925 Australian federal election: Moreton
Party	Candidate	Votes	%	±%
Nationalist	Josiah Francis	25,650	63.2	+18.7
Labor	Horace Lee	14,907	36.8	−1.4
Total formal votes		40,557	96.8	
Informal votes		1,325	3.2	
Turnout		41,882	94.1	
Nationalist hold		Swing	+3.7	

=== Oxley ===
1925 Australian federal election: Oxley
Party	Candidate	Votes	%	±%
Nationalist	James Bayley	25,421	55.7	+2.4
Labor	James Sharpe	20,233	44.3	−2.4
Total formal votes		45,654	96.5	
Informal votes		1,675	3.5	
Turnout		47,329	92.2	
Nationalist hold		Swing	+2.4	

=== Wide Bay ===
1925 Australian federal election: Wide Bay
Party	Candidate	Votes	%	±%
Nationalist	Edward Corser	25,877	64.5	+26.1
Labor	Andrew Thompson	14,231	35.5	+1.5
Total formal votes		40,108	96.7	
Informal votes		1,348	3.3	
Turnout		41,456	91.8	
Nationalist hold		Swing	+4.0	

== South Australia ==
=== Adelaide ===
1925 Australian federal election: Adelaide
Party	Candidate	Votes	%	±%
Labor	George Edwin Yates	19,693	50.9	−0.8
Nationalist	George McLeay	19,018	49.1	+29.2
Total formal votes		38,711	95.2	
Informal votes		1,953	4.8	
Turnout		40,664	88.4	
Labor hold		Swing	−2.7	

=== Angas ===
1925 Australian federal election: Angas
Party	Candidate	Votes	%	±%
Nationalist	Walter Parsons	20,428	50.3	+50.3
Labor	Moses Gabb	20,178	49.7	−8.3
Total formal votes		40,606	96.1	
Informal votes		1,640	3.9	
Turnout		42,246	94.2	
Nationalist gain from Labor		Swing	+8.3	

=== Barker ===
1925 Australian federal election: Barker
Party	Candidate	Votes	%	±%
Nationalist	Malcolm Cameron	24,356	61.6	+61.6
Labor	Alwyn Roberts	15,209	38.4	−4.7
Total formal votes		39,565	95.2	
Informal votes		1,993	4.8	
Turnout		41,558	93.7	
Nationalist gain from Liberal		Swing	+9.3	

=== Boothby ===
1925 Australian federal election: Boothby
Party	Candidate	Votes	%	±%
Nationalist	Jack Duncan-Hughes	23,602	57.6	+36.4
Labor	Harry Kneebone	17,409	42.4	+3.0
Total formal votes		41,011	96.5	
Informal votes		1,483	3.5	
Turnout		42,494	93.8	
Nationalist gain from Liberal		Swing	+2.9	

=== Grey ===
1925 Australian federal election: Grey
Party	Candidate	Votes	%	±%
Labor	Andrew Lacey	16,427	52.6	−1.1
Nationalist	John Lyons	14,780	47.4	+1.1
Total formal votes		31,207	95.9	
Informal votes		1,318	4.1	
Turnout		32,525	91.8	
Labor hold		Swing	−1.1	

=== Hindmarsh ===
1925 Australian federal election: Hindmarsh
Party	Candidate	Votes	%	±%
Labor	Norman Makin	29,097	65.2	−3.4
Nationalist	John Verran	15,504	34.8	+3.4
Total formal votes		44,601	95.6	
Informal votes		2,058	4.4	
Turnout		46,659	94.3	
Labor hold		Swing	−3.4	

=== Wakefield ===
1925 Australian federal election: Wakefield
Party	Candidate	Votes	%	±%
Nationalist	Richard Foster	21,846	64.8	+64.8
Labor	Even George	11,842	35.2	−1.5
Total formal votes		33,688	95.0	
Informal votes		1,773	5.0	
Turnout		35,461	93.3	
Nationalist gain from Liberal		Swing	+9.5	

== Western Australia ==
=== Forrest ===
1925 Australian federal election: Forrest
Party	Candidate	Votes	%	±%
Country	John Prowse	21,760	60.9	−18.6
Labor	Thomas Lowry	13,976	39.1	+39.1
Total formal votes		35,736	96.5	
Informal votes		1,301	3.5	
Turnout		37,037	89.9	
Country hold		Swing	−18.6	

=== Fremantle ===
1925 Australian federal election: Fremantle
Party	Candidate	Votes	%	±%
Independent	William Watson	20,568	58.1	+17.5
Labor	John Curtin	14,812	41.9	+2.0
Total formal votes		35,380	97.6	
Informal votes		877	2.4	
Turnout		36,257	92.2	
Independent hold		Swing	+1.2	

=== Kalgoorlie ===
1925 Australian federal election: Kalgoorlie
Party	Candidate	Votes	%	±%
Labor	Albert Green	14,245	57.6	+0.2
Nationalist	John Mullany	10,476	42.4	−0.2
Total formal votes		24,721	97.2	
Informal votes		717	2.8	
Turnout		25,438	86.0	
Labor hold		Swing	+0.2	

=== Perth ===
1925 Australian federal election: Perth
Party	Candidate	Votes	%	±%
Nationalist	Edward Mann	21,517	62.8	−3.0
Labor	Dick Lane	12,768	37.2	+3.0
Total formal votes		34,285	96.7	
Informal votes		1,161	3.3	
Turnout		35,446	91.3	
Nationalist hold		Swing	+3.9	

=== Swan ===
1925 Australian federal election: Swan
Party	Candidate	Votes	%	±%
Country	Henry Gregory	24,978	66.2	+66.2
Labor	Ben Davies	12,773	33.8	+33.8
Total formal votes		37,751	96.7	
Informal votes		1,269	3.3	
Turnout		39,020	88.4	
Country hold		Swing	−33.8	

== Tasmania ==
=== Bass ===
1925 Australian federal election: Bass
Party	Candidate	Votes	%	±%
Nationalist	Syd Jackson	10,929	57.0	+6.8
Labor	Harold Holmes	5,654	29.5	+8.0
Labor	John Swain	2,582	13.5	+13.5
Total formal votes		19,165	94.1	
Informal votes		1,192	5.9	
Turnout		29,357	88.5	
Two-party-preferred result
Nationalist	Syd Jackson		58.3	+4.7
Labor	Harold Holmes		41.7	−4.7
Nationalist hold		Swing	+4.7	

=== Darwin ===
1925 Australian federal election: Darwin
Party	Candidate	Votes	%	±%
Nationalist	George Bell	9,682	48.1	+17.5
Labor	Henry Lane	7,541	37.5	+37.5
Nationalist	Hubert Nichols	2,886	14.4	+14.4
Total formal votes		20,109	95.5	
Informal votes		939	4.5	
Turnout		21,048	90.7	
Two-party-preferred result
Nationalist	George Bell	12,164	60.5	+10.9
Labor	Henry Lane	7,945	39.5	+39.5
Nationalist gain from Country		Swing	+10.9	

=== Denison ===
1925 Australian federal election: Denison
Party	Candidate	Votes	%	±%
Nationalist	Sir John Gellibrand	10,782	52.2	+0.2
Labor	David O'Keefe	9,882	47.8	+1.3
Total formal votes		20,664	97.9	
Informal votes		450	2.1	
Turnout		21,114	88.5	
Nationalist gain from Labor		Swing	+2.6	

=== Franklin ===
1925 Australian federal election: Franklin
Party	Candidate	Votes	%	±%
Nationalist	Alfred Seabrook	6,107	31.5	+30.2
Nationalist	William McWilliams	5,879	30.3	+30.3
Labor	Eric Ogilvie	5,836	30.1	−5.5
Labor	Douglas Thompson	1,574	8.1	+8.1
Total formal votes		19,396	93.6	
Informal votes		1,325	6.4	
Turnout		20,721	86.5	
Two-party-preferred result
Nationalist	Alfred Seabrook	10,787	55.6	−0.7
Labor	Eric Ogilvie	8,609	44.4	+0.7
Nationalist hold		Swing	−0.7	

=== Wilmot ===
1925 Australian federal election: Wilmot
Party	Candidate	Votes	%	±%
Labor	Jens Jensen	7,118	38.7	+6.5
Country	Llewellyn Atkinson	5,448	29.6	−14.3
Nationalist	Percy Best	3,134	17.1	+7.8
Nationalist	Atherfield Newman	2,681	14.6	+14.6
Total formal votes		18,381	94.3	
Informal votes		1,121	5.7	
Turnout		19,502	89.7	
Two-party-preferred result
Country	Llewellyn Atkinson	10,746	57.0	−4.2
Labor	Jens Jensen	7,905	43.0	+4.2
Country hold		Swing	−4.2	

== Northern Territory ==
=== Northern Territory ===
1925 Australian federal election: Northern Territory
Party	Candidate	Votes	%	±%
Labor	Harold Nelson	853	62.4	+25.0
Nationalist	Charles Story	513	37.6	+37.6
Total formal votes		1,366	98.2	
Informal votes		25	1.8	
Turnout		1,391	79.1	
Labor hold		Swing	+12.0	

== See also ==
- Candidates of the 1925 Australian federal election
- Members of the Australian House of Representatives, 1925–1928
- Results of the 1925 Australian federal election (Senate)
