= 1925 Australian Senate election =

- 14 November 1925

22 of the 36 seats in the Senate 19 seats needed for a majority
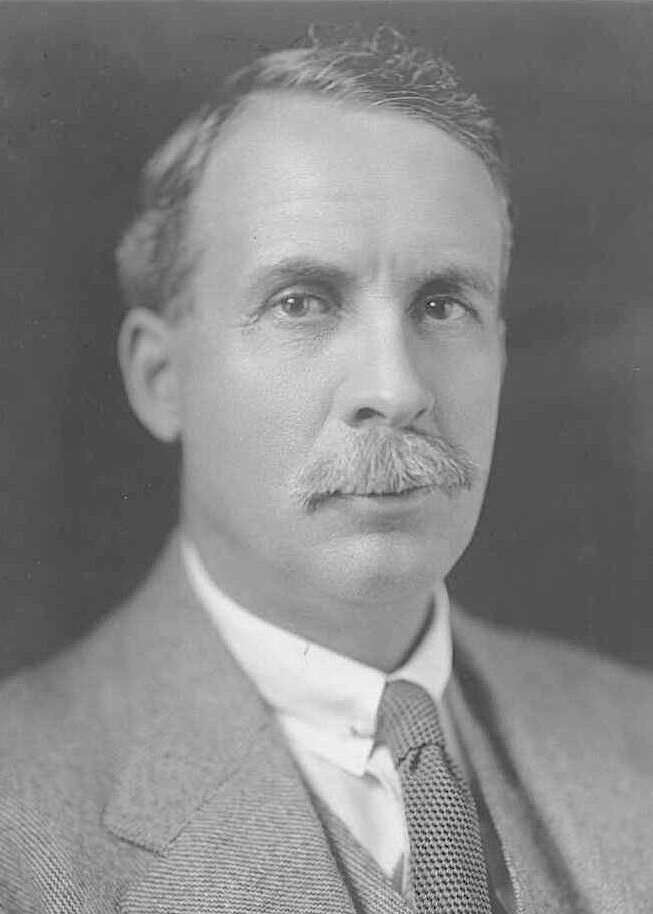

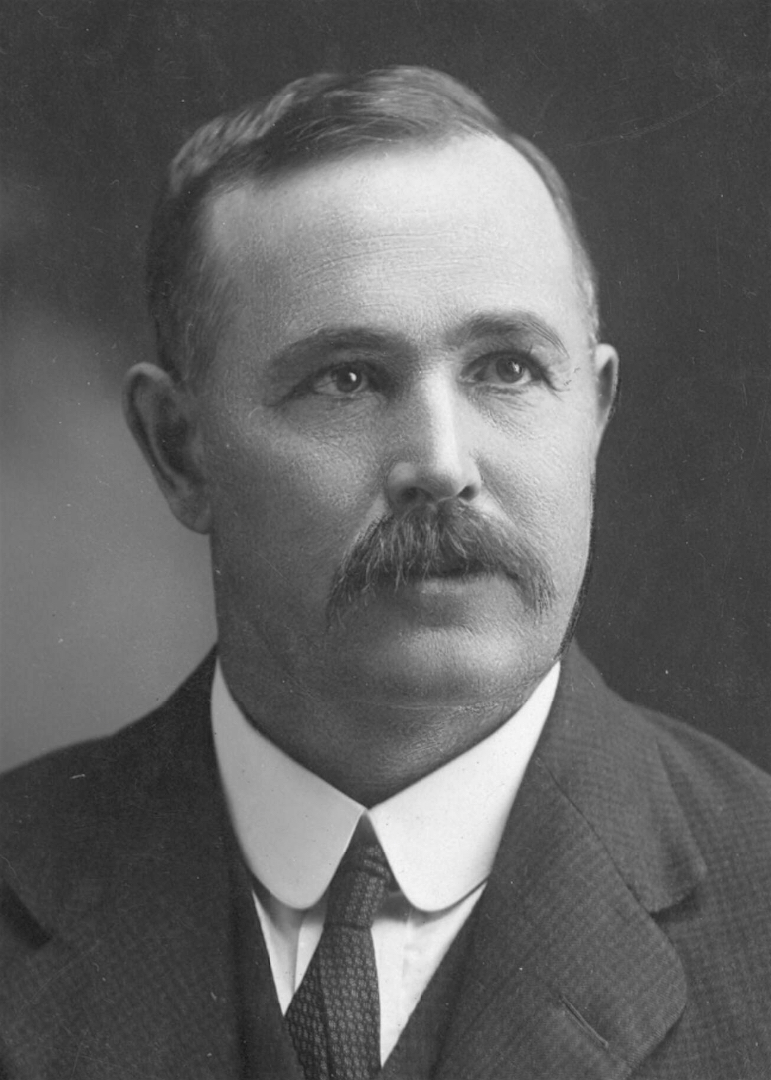
	First party	Second party
Leader	George Pearce	Albert Gardiner
Party	Nationalist/Country coalition	Labor
Leader's seat	Western Australia	New South Wales
Seats before	24 (Note: As there was no coalition before the previous election, this count is of seats held by the Nationalist Party.)	12
Seats won	22	0
Seats after	28	8
Seat change	▲4	▼4
Popular vote	1,537,282	1,262,912
Percentage	54.81	45.02
Swing	▲5.59	▼0.68

The 1925 Australian Senate election was held on 14 November 1925 to elect 22 of the 36 senators in the Australian Senate as part of the 1925 federal election. Each state elected three senators to serve a six-year term beginning on 1 July 1926. Due to casual vacancies, Victoria and Tasmania elected an extra senator, while New South Wales elected two extra senators.

The election was the first to implement compulsory voting following the passing of the 1924 amendment to the Commonwealth Electoral Act. The introduction of compulsory voting raised turnout to over 91%, compared with a turnout of under 60% at the previous election.

== Australia ==
1925 Australian federal election: Senate, National
Party	Votes	%	±	Seats			
Party	Votes	%	±	Seats won	Not up	New total	Seat change
Nationalist	1,272,127	45.35	+9.12	18	6	24	Steady
Country	265,155	9.45	–3.54	4	0	4	▲4
Nationalist/Country Coalition	1,537,282	54.81	+5.59	22	6	28	▲4
Labor	1,262,912	45.02	–0.68	0	8	8	▼4
Independent	4,808	0.17	–1.33	0	0	0	Steady
Total	2,805,002	100.00	–	22	14	36	–
Invalid/blank votes	209,951	6.96	−2.48	–	–	–	–
Turnout	3,014,953	91.31	+33.32	–	–	–	–
Registered voters	3,302,016	–	–	–	–	–	–

== New South Wales ==
Following the death of Nationalist senator Edward Millen in September 1923, Nationalist Walter Massy-Greene was appointed by the Parliament of New South Wales to fill the casual vacancy. Additionally, after the death of Labor senator Allan McDougall in October 1924, the vacancy was first filled by Jack Power and then by William Gibbs, both Labor members. As a result, New South Wales elected five senators, with the fourth and fifth senators elected sitting the remainder of Millen and McDougall's term ending on 30 June 1929.

1925 Australian federal election: Senate, New South Wales
Party	Candidate	Votes	%	±%
Nationalist/Country Coalition	1. Charles Cox (Nat) (re-elected 1); 2. Percy Abbott (CP) (elected 5); 3. Walter Massy-Greene (Nat) (elected 3); 4. Josiah Thomas (Nat) (elected 4); 5. Walter Duncan (Nat) (re-elected 2)	572,583	53.45	−0.35
Labor	1. Albert Gardiner (defeated); 2. John Dooley; 3. Donald Grant; 4. James Dunn; 5. John Eldridge	498,672	46.55	+2.55
Total formal votes		1,071,255	93.57	+3.57
Informal votes		73,638	6.43	−3.57
Turnout		1,144,893	90.31	+35.82

#	Senator	Party
1	Charles Cox	Nationalist
2	Walter Duncan	Nationalist
3	Walter Massy-Greene	Nationalist
4	Josiah Thomas	Nationalist
5	Percy Abbott	Country

== Victoria ==
Following the death of Labor senator Stephen Barker in June 1924, Labor member Joseph Hannan was appointed by the Parliament of Victoria to fill the casual vacancy. As a result, Victoria elected four senators, with the fourth senator elected sitting the remainder of Barker's term ending on 30 June 1929.

1925 Australian federal election: Senate, Victoria
Party	Candidate	Votes	%	±%
Nationalist/Country Coalition	1. Harold Elliott (Nat) (re-elected 1); 2. David Andrew (CP) (elected 4); 3. James Guthrie (Nat) (re-elected 2); 4. William Plain (Nat) (re-elected 3)	459,406	54.52	N/A
Labor	1. Joseph Hannan (defeated); 2. Albert Blakey; 3. Richard Keane; 4. Jack Holloway	383,298	45.48	−3.50
Total formal votes		842,704	92.37	+0.30
Informal votes		69,634	7.63	−0.30
Turnout		912,338	92.98	+36.75

#	Senator	Party
1	Harold Elliott	Nationalist
2	James Guthrie	Nationalist
3	William Plain	Nationalist
4	David Andrew	Country

== Queensland ==
1925 Australian federal election: Senate, Queensland
Party	Candidate	Votes	%	±%
Nationalist	1. Thomas Givens (re-elected 1); 2. William Glasgow (re-elected 2); 3. William Thompson (re-elected 3)	214,629	57.29	+14.94
Labor	1. Jim Riordan; 2. Harald Jensen; 3. Harry Turley	160,016	42.71	−1.30
Total formal votes		374,645	93.62	+4.37
Informal votes		25,530	6.38	−4.37
Turnout		400,175	90.77	+8.11

#	Senator	Party
1	Thomas Givens	Nationalist
2	William Glasgow	Nationalist
3	William Thompson	Nationalist

== Western Australia ==
1925 Australian federal election: Senate, Western Australia
Party	Candidate	Votes	%	±%
Nationalist/Country Coalition	1. William Carroll (CP) (elected 3); 2. George Pearce (Nat) (re-elected 1); 3. Patrick Lynch (Nat) (re-elected 2)	92,125	57.44	0.00
Labor	1. Andrew Clementson; 2. Ernest Barker; 3. James Kenneally	63,460	39.57	−2.06
Independent	1. James Crawford	4,808	3.00	+3.00
Total formal votes		160,393	92.61	+1.85
Informal votes		12,805	7.39	−1.85
Turnout		173,198	89.72	+42.45

#	Senator	Party
1	George Pearce	Nationalist
2	Patrick Lynch	Nationalist
3	William Carroll	Country

== South Australia ==
1925 Australian federal election: Senate, South Australia
Party	Candidate	Votes	%	±%
Nationalist/Country Coalition	1. John Newland (Nat) (elected 1); 2. Victor Wilson (Nat) (defeated); 3. John Chapman (CP) (elected 3); 4. Alexander McLachlan (Nat) (elected 2)	145,502	54.94	N/A
Labor	1. John Daly; 2. Frank Lundie; 3. Herbert George	119,339	45.06	−3.44
Total formal votes		264,841	94.05	+3.31
Informal votes		16,766	5.95	−3.31
Turnout		281,607	92.82	+39.60

#	Senator	Party
1	John Newland	Nationalist
2	Alexander McLachlan	Nationalist
3	John Chapman	Country

== Tasmania ==
Following the death of Nationalist senator Thomas Bakhap in August 1923, Nationalist John Hayes was appointed by the Parliament of Tasmania to fill the casual vacancy. As a result, Tasmania elected four senators, with the fourth senator elected sitting the remainder of Bakhap's term ending on 30 June 1929.

1925 Australian federal election: Senate, Tasmania
Party	Candidate	Votes	%	±%
Nationalist	1. Burford Sampson (elected 2); 2. John Millen (re-elected 1); 3. Charles Grant (defeated); 4. John Earle; 5. Herbert Payne (re-elected 3); 6. John Hayes (re-elected 4); 7. John Ockerby	53,037	58.18	+8.10
Labor	1. James McDonald; 2. Richard Crouch; 3. Thomas Wilson; 4. Alfred Higgins; 5. William Lloyd	38,127	41.82	−1.50
Total formal votes		91,164	88.73	−2.00
Informal votes		11,578	11.27	+2.00
Turnout		102,742	88.74	+43.11

#	Senator	Party
1	John Millen	Nationalist
2	Burford Sampson	Nationalist
3	Herbert Payne	Nationalist
4	John Hayes	Nationalist

== See also ==
- Candidates of the 1925 Australian federal election
- Results of the 1925 Australian federal election (House of Representatives)
- Members of the Australian Senate, 1926–1929
