= Members of the Australian Senate, 1926–1929 =

Senate composition at 1 July 1926
Government (28) - (11 seat majority)
Nationalist (25) (Note: Nationalist Senator Thomas Givens died in June 1928 and was replaced by Labor member John MacDonald until the November 1928 election, when the casual vacancy was won by Country Party candidate Walter Cooper.) (Note: Nationalist Senator Albert Robinson did not stand for election at the November 1928 election and the casual vacancy was won by Labor candidate Mick O'Halloran.)
Country Party (3)

Opposition (7)
Labor (7) (Note: Labor Senator Charles McHugh died in July 1927 and was replaced by Nationalist John Verran until the November 1928 election, when the casual vacancy was won by Labor candidate John Daly.)

Crossbench (1)
Independent (1) (Note: James Ogden was expelled from the Labor Party in 1925 & sat as an independent until the 1928 election when he was re-elected as a Nationalist.)

Changes in composition

This is a list of members of the Australian Senate from 1926 to 1929. Half of its members were elected at the 16 December 1922 election and had terms starting on 1 July 1923 and finishing on 30 June 1929; the other half were elected at the 14 November 1925 election and had terms starting on 1 July 1926 and finishing on 30 June 1932. The process for filling casual vacancies was complex. While senators were elected for a six-year term, people appointed to a casual vacancy only held office until the earlier of the next election for the House of Representatives or the Senate.

Senator	Party	State	Term ending	Years in office
Percy Abbott	Nationalist	New South Wales	1929	1925–29
Richard Abbott (Note: Country Party Senator David Andrew died on 18 November 1928, having not stood for re-election at the 1928 election; Country Party member Richard Abbott was appointed on 18 December to replace him for the rest of his term, expiring on 30 June 1929.)	Country	Victoria	1929	1928–1929
David Andrew	Country	Victoria	1929	1925–1928
John Barnes	Labor	Victoria	1929	1913–1920, 1923–1935
Henry Barwell (Note: Nationalist Senator Henry Barwell resigned on 22 March 1928 to become South Australian Agent-General to London; Nationalist Albert Robinson was appointed on 18 April to replace him until the November 1928 election. Robinson did not stand for re-election in 1928 and the vacancy was won by Labor candidate Mick O'Halloran.)	Nationalist	South Australia	1928 (Note: Appointed to a casual vacancy and only held office until the earlier of the next election for the House of Representatives or the Senate.)	1925–1928
William Carroll	Country	Western Australia	1932	1926–1936
John Chapman	Country	South Australia	1932	1926–1931
Walter Cooper (Note: Nationalist Senator Thomas Givens died on 19 June 1928; Labor member John MacDonald was appointed on 1 August to replace him until the November 1928 election, when he was defeated by Country Party candidate Walter Cooper.)	Country	Queensland	1932	1928–1932, 1935–1968
Charles Cox	Nationalist	New South Wales	1932	1920–1938
Thomas Crawford	Nationalist	Queensland	1929	1917–1947
John Daly (Note: Labor Senator Charles McHugh died on 24 July 1927; Nationalist and former Premier of South Australia John Verran was appointed on 30 August to replace him until the November 1928 election, when he was defeated by Labor candidate John Daly.)	Labor	South Australia	1929	1928–1935
John Dooley (Note: Labor Senator John Grant died on 19 May 1928; Labor member and former senator Albert Gardiner was appointed on 5 June to replace him until the November 1928 election. Gardiner did not stand for re-election in 1928 and the vacancy was won by Labor candidate John Dooley.)	Labor	New South Wales	1929	1928–1935
Walter Duncan	Nationalist	New South Wales	1932	1920–1931
Harold Elliott	Nationalist	Victoria	1932	1920–1931
Edward Findley	Labor	Victoria	1929	1904–1917, 1923–1929
Harry Foll	Nationalist	Queensland	1929	1917–1947
Albert Gardiner	Independent Labor	New South Wales	1928	1910–1926, 1928
Thomas Givens	Nationalist	Queensland	1932	1904–1928
William Glasgow	Nationalist	Queensland	1932	1920–1932
Charles Graham	Labor	Western Australia	1929	1923–1929
John Grant	Labor	New South Wales	1929	1914–1920, 1923–1928
James Guthrie	Nationalist	Victoria	1932	1920–1938
John Hayes	Nationalist	Tasmania	1929	1923–1947
Herbert Hays	Nationalist	Tasmania	1929	1923–1947
Bert Hoare	Labor	South Australia	1929	1922–1935
Walter Kingsmill	Nationalist	Western Australia	1929	1923–1935
Patrick Lynch	Nationalist	Western Australia	1932	1907–1938
John MacDonald	Labor	Queensland	1928	1922, 1928, 1932–1937
Walter Massy-Greene	Nationalist	New South Wales	1932	1923–1925, 1926–1938
Charles McHugh	Labor	South Australia	1929	1923–1927
Alexander McLachlan	Nationalist	South Australia	1932	1926–1944
John Millen	Nationalist	Tasmania	1932	1920–1938
Ted Needham	Labor	Western Australia	1929	1907–1920, 1923–1929
John Newlands	Nationalist	South Australia	1932	1913–1932
James Ogden	Ind/Nationalist (Note: James Ogden was expelled from the Labor Party in 1925 for supporting the Bruce-Page government's legislation on navigation and immigration. He sat as an independent until the 1928 election when he was re-elected as a Nationalist.)	Tasmania	1929	1923–1932
Mick O'Halloran	Labor	South Australia	1929	1928–1935
Herbert Payne	Nationalist	Tasmania	1932	1920–1938
Sir George Pearce (Note: Father of the Senate)	Nationalist	Western Australia	1932	1901–1938
William Plain	Nationalist	Victoria	1932	1917–1923, 1925–1938
Matthew Reid	Nationalist	Queensland	1929	1917–1935
Albert Robinson	Nationalist	South Australia	1928	1928
Burford Sampson	Nationalist	Tasmania	1932	1925–1938, 1941–1947
Josiah Thomas	Nationalist	New South Wales	1929	1917–1923, 1925–1929
William Thompson	Nationalist	Queensland	1932	1922–1932
John Verran	Nationalist	South Australia	1928	1927–1928
