= Walter Leslie Duncan =

Australian politician (1883–1947)

Walter Duncan
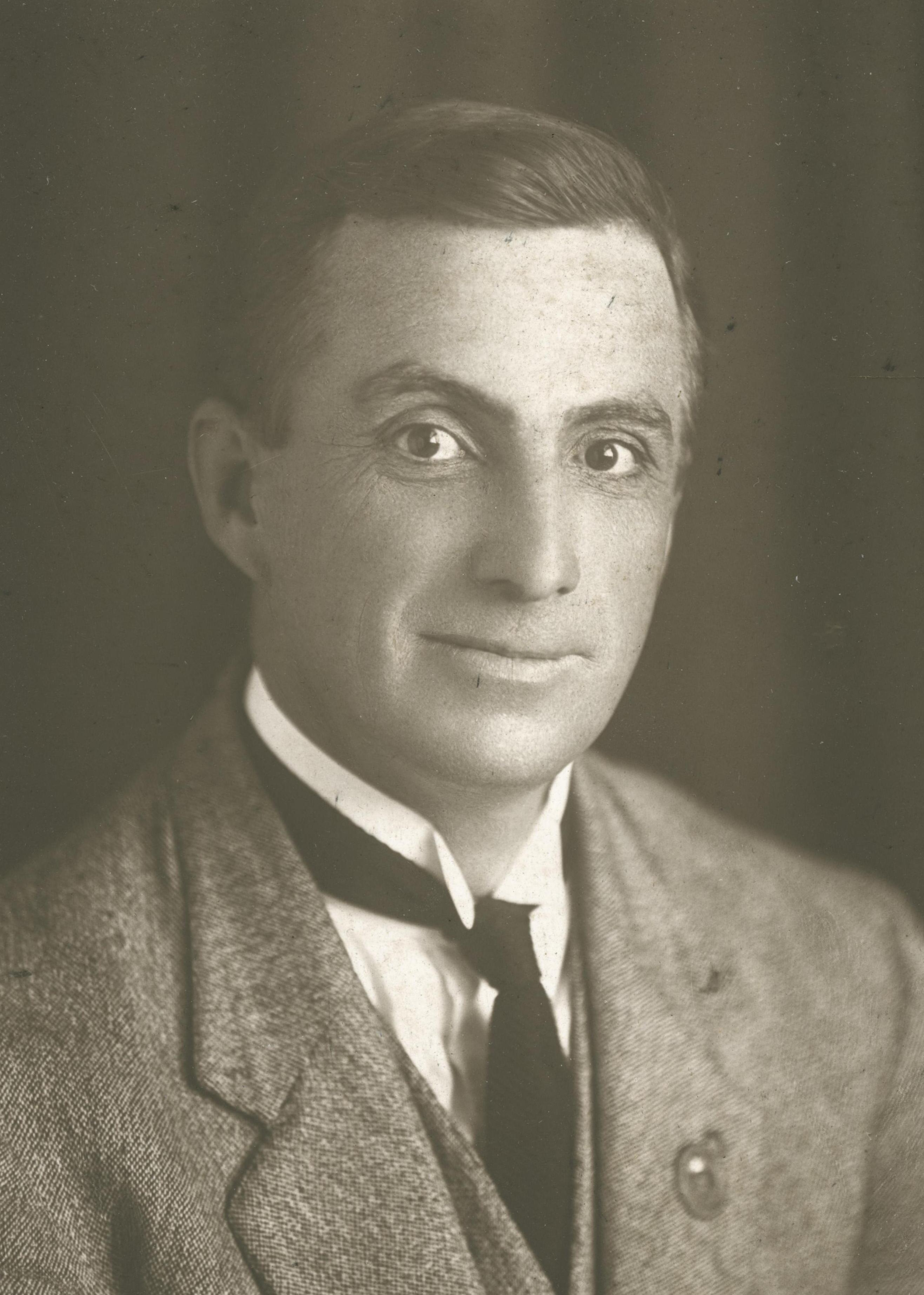

Senator for New South Wales
- In office 1 July 1920 – 1 December 1931
- Succeeded by: Patrick Mooney

Personal details
- Born: 14 February 1883 Armidale, New South Wales, Australia
- Died: 28 May 1947 (aged 64) West Tamworth, New South Wales, Australia
- Party: Labor (to 1917); Nationalist (1917–29); Australian (1929–31); United Australia (from 1931)
- Spouses: Ellen Riley (m. 1910; died 1922) Kathleen Flemming (m. 1923; died 1941) Eileen Coutman (m. 1946)
- Relations: Edward Riley (father-in-law); Edward C. Riley (brother-in-law)
- Occupation: Clerk

Walter Leslie Duncan (14 February 1883 – 28 May 1947) was an Australian politician and trade unionist. He was a Senator for New South Wales from 1920 to 1931.

Duncan was born in Armidale, New South Wales. He moved to Sydney after leaving school and worked as a clerk and accountant, becoming involved in the labour movement. He served as president of the Clerks' Union and briefly as president of the Labor Council of New South Wales, also standing twice in state elections for the Australian Labor Party (ALP). During World War I, Duncan sided with Prime Minister Billy Hughes during the ALP split over conscription and subsequently joined Hughes' new Nationalist Party. He enlisted in the Australian Imperial Force in 1917 and served overseas for several months with the 17th Battalion.

Duncan was elected to the Senate on the Nationalist ticket at the 1919 federal election, campaigning as a returned soldier. He served as a government whip from 1925 to 1926 and was re-elected to a second term at the 1925 election. Duncan continued to ally himself with Hughes in parliament, frequently crossing the floor. After Hughes and his supporters precipitated the collapse of the Bruce–Page government in 1929, Duncan was expelled from the Nationalists and joined Hughes' new Australian Party, which merged into the United Australia Party in 1931. He resigned from the Senate in 1931 after losing UAP preselection and made several unsuccessful attempts to re-enter parliament.

== Early life ==
Duncan was born on 14 February 1883 in Armidale, New South Wales. He was the son of Margaret (née McDowell) and John Mackie Duncan; his father was a flour miller.

Duncan was raised in Armidale and attended Armidale Superior Public School. After leaving school he moved to Sydney and found work as a clerk. He also had some experience as an accountant.

== Labour movement and early candidacies ==
Duncan became involved in the labour movement through the Clerks' Union. He also joined the Australian Labor Party (ALP) at a young age and stood twice unsuccessfully for the New South Wales Legislative Assembly, running in Granville at the 1907 state election and in Waverley at the 1910 state election.

Duncan served as president of the United Clerks' Union of New South Wales and was also on the executive of the Coke Workers' Association of New South Wales. He was elected vice-president of the Labor Council of New South Wales in 1910 and the following year succeeded as president, then a rotating office. He was involved in the disputes between the militant industrial faction of the ALP and the moderate parliamentary faction led by William Holman. He was initially seen as a moderate, but by 1912 was president of the Labor Principles Defence Committee which sided with the industrialists.

== Defection and World War I ==
During World War I, Duncan supported the efforts of ALP prime minister Billy Hughes to require conscripted soldiers to serve overseas. The conscription issue ultimately led to a major split within the ALP in 1916, with Hughes and his supporters into the new National Labor Party and later joining with the Liberals to form a new Nationalist Party. Duncan stood as a Nationalist in Granville at the 1917 state election, losing to the incumbent Labor MP and future premier Jack Lang. He was one of the few ALP "industrialists" to defect during the split.

In December 1917, Duncan enlisted as a private in the Australian Imperial Force. He was posted to the 17th Battalion and embarked for Europe in July 1918, serving overseas for four months. He returned to Australia in November 1918 but was not formally discharged from the military until December 1919.

== Senate, 1920–1931 ==
=== First term ===
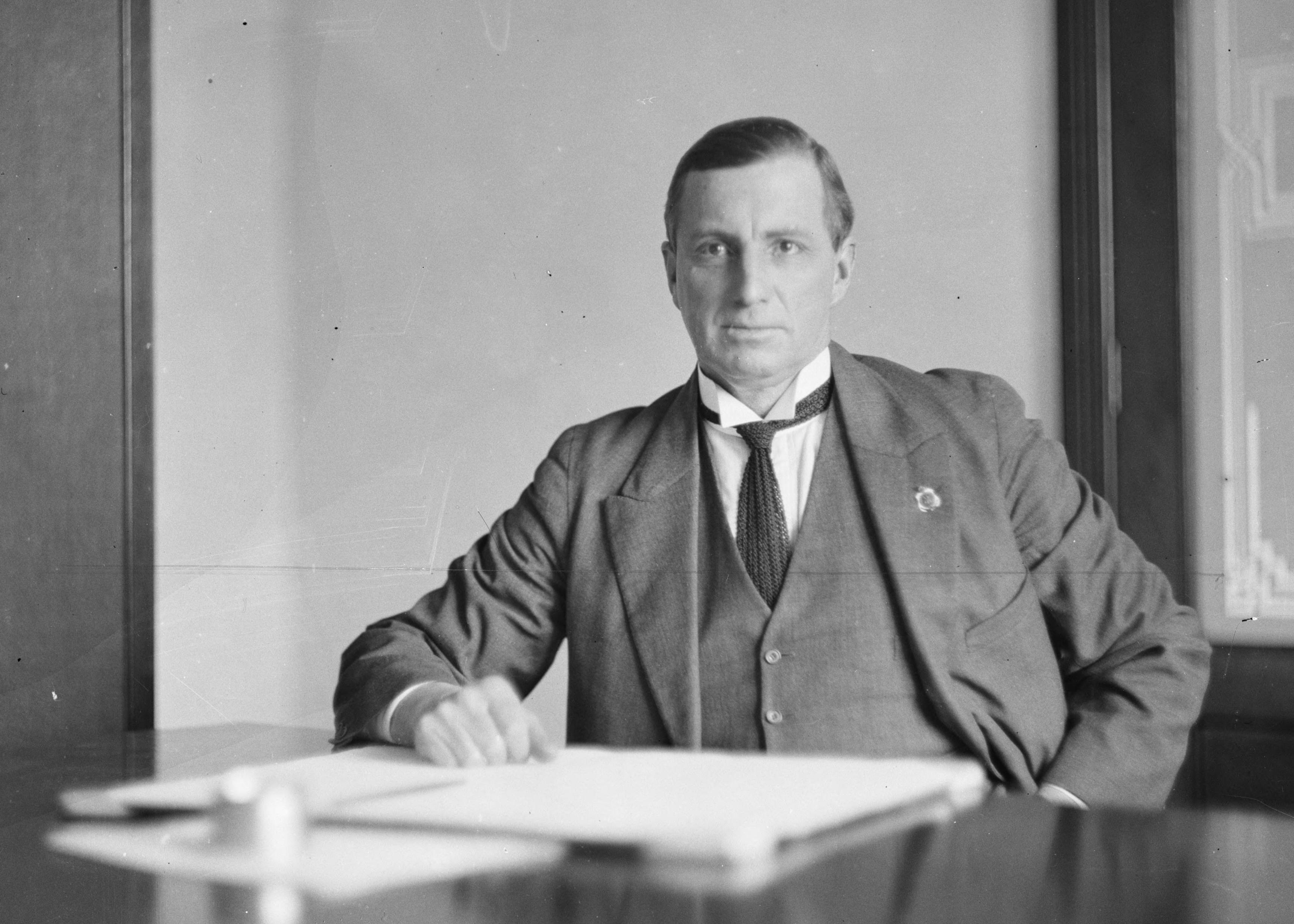
Duncan, c. 1931

Duncan was elected to the Senate at the 1919 federal election, running in second place on the Nationalist ticket in New South Wales under Brigadier General Charles Cox. Promotional material made frequent reference to both candidates' military service.

Duncan's first six-year Senate term commenced on 1 July 1920. In parliament he was "consistent in his emphasis on a White Australia within the Empire but with a unique national character, a Commonwealth government of ample power (seated in Canberra) and effective arbitration in industry. He supported, where necessary, regulation of business, coupled with high protection, and was suspicious of foreign powers such as the United States". Duncan was appointed as government whip in 1925 and also served on two royal commissions and several Senate committees.

=== Second term ===
At the 1925 election, Duncan was re-elected to a second six-year term. He increasingly allied himself with former prime minister Billy Hughes, becoming his "only consistent defender in the Senate". He encouraged Hughes in the formation of a "progressive centre party". Duncan's support for the Bruce–Page government declined in his second term and he crossed the floor on a number of occasions. As a senator, he did not vote in the confidence motion that brought down the government in 1929 and forced an early election, but he was nonetheless excluded from the Nationalist Party after the election.

In 1929, Duncan joined Hughes' new Australian Party alongside his Senate colleague Walter Massy-Greene and Hughes, Walter Marks and George Maxwell in the lower house. He was elected as a vice-president of the party organisation and was its only parliamentary member to remain loyal to Hughes throughout its existence. He and Hughes joined the new United Australia Party (UAP) upon its formation in early 1931, reuniting with their former Nationalist colleagues and dissident Labor MPs led by Joseph Lyons.

Duncan was also a supporter of the New England statehood movement, which sought the separation of northern New South Wales into a new state. He was a member of the central executive of the Northern New State Movement. In 1931 he appeared alongside Country Party leader Earle Page at a statehood convention in Armidale, seconding a motion by David Drummond to present a petition to federal parliament for recognition of the new state. He stated his belief that he was "the only member of the Senate from the State of New South Wales who had been a consistent supporter of the New State movement in the Senate".

Duncan failed to win UAP preselection for the Senate at the 1931 election, apparently due to the intervention of the Country Party which objected to his inclusion on a joint ticket. He resigned from the Senate on 1 December 1931, instead standing for the House of Representatives in opposition to Archdale Parkhill, the sitting UAP MP for Warringah. He was unsuccessful, despite receiving the support of the All for Australia League.

== Later life ==
Duncan made two further attempts to return to parliament, standing for the UAP in the safe Labor seat of Illawarra at the 1935 New South Wales state election and as one of five endorsed UAP candidates in Werriwa at the 1940 federal election. He also served as Hughes' secretary during the 1943 federal election campaign.

In July 1941, Duncan re-enlisted in the military, giving his profession as "journalist and editor". He served with the regular army until June 1943, when he transferred to the Citizen Military Force with the rank of lieutenant. He later worked as a supervisor of Commonwealth war loans.

== Personal life ==
Duncan married three times and had four children. His first wife Ellen Cousins Riley was the daughter of Edward Riley and the sister of Edward Charles Riley, both of whom were federal Labor MPs. They married in 1910 and had three sons, but she died in 1922. Duncan remarried the following year to Kathleen Flemming, a bank clerk, with whom he subsequently had a daughter. He was widowed a second time in 1941 and remarried in 1946 to Eileen Coutman. He died of pneumonia and nephritis on 28 May 1947 in West Tamworth, New South Wales.
