= John Millen (Australian politician) =

Australian engineer and politician

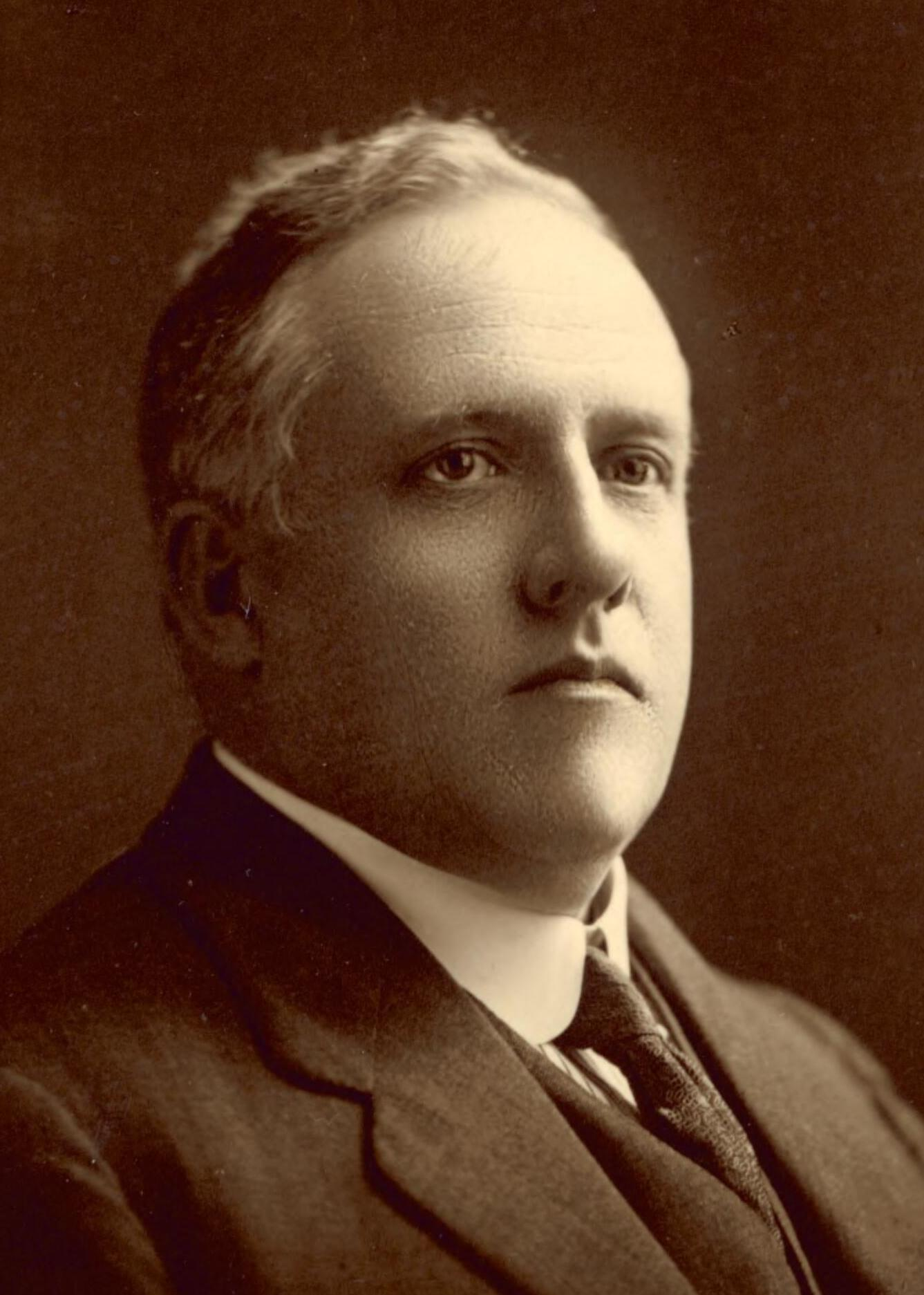

Senator for Tasmania
- In office 1 July 1920 – 30 June 1938

Personal details
- Born: 3 May 1877 Derry, Ireland
- Died: 1 August 1941 (aged 64) Launceston, Tasmania, Australia
- Party: Nationalist (to 1931); United Australia Party (from 1931)
- Spouse: Janet Scott (m. 1906)
- Education: Toowoomba Grammar School; Sydney Technical College
- Occupation: Mining engineer

John Dunlop Millen (3 May 1877 – 1 August 1941) was an Australian engineer and politician. He served as a Senator for Tasmania from 1920 to 1938, representing the Nationalist Party until 1931 and then the United Australia Party. He managed the Mount Bischoff tin mine before entering politics and served a term as president of the Institution of Engineers, Australia.

== Early life ==
Millen was born on 3 May 1877 in Derry, Ireland. He was the son of Kate (née Dickson) and John Millen. The family immigrated to the Colony of Queensland in 1884, settling in Toowoomba where his father worked as a draper.

Millen attended Toowoomba Grammar School and obtained a diploma from Sydney Technical College. In 1903 he moved to Launceston, Tasmania, to work as a metallurgist for the Mount Bischoff Tin Mining Company smelting works. He was also a consultant for the Renison Bell mine and an advisory engineer to the Vacuum Oil Company of Australia. In 1907, Millen was appointed manager of the Mount Bischoff mine at Waratah. He held the position until 1919 and was credited with the modernisation of the mine's facilities.

== Politics ==
Millen was elected to the Senate at the 1919 federal election, standing as a Nationalist. He received the highest vote in the state, and was re-elected at the 1925 and 1931 elections, joining the United Australia Party upon its formation. His term began on 1 July 1920 and concluded on 30 June 1938 following his defeat at the 1937 election.

In the Senate, Millen was known for his committee work, including service on the Joint Committee on Public Accounts (1920–1925) and the select committee into the government's proposed agreement with AWA for expanding radio communications between Australia and the UK. According to Robert Menzies, his most important work was as chairman of the Royal Commission on National Insurance which sat between 1923 and 1927. The government's National Insurance Bill 1928 adopted many of the committee's recommendations, but ultimately failed to pass before its defeat in 1929. Millen had an interest in technological subjects, including the development of the CSIRO. He stood for President of the Senate in 1935 but was not successful.

== Other activities ==
Millen was a foundation member of the Institution of Engineers, Australia (IEA), serving on its council and as its fifth president in 1924. He also served on the main committee of the Australian Commonwealth Engineering Standards Association. He was a director of AWA and the Australian Provincial Assurance Association, and shortly before his death he became the managing director of the Hadfields Steel Works at Alexandria, New South Wales.

== Personal life ==
Millen married Janet May Scott in 1906, with whom he had three sons. He suffered from diabetes and was absent from the Senate for health reasons on a number of occasions. He died in Launceston on 1 August 1941, aged 64.
