= Alfred Horsfall =

Australian military surgeon

Dr Alfred Horsfall DSO
- Born: 27 January 1871
- Died: 26 November 1944 (aged 73)
- Military career
- Rank: Major
- Conflicts: Second Boer War; First World War
- Awards: Distinguished Service Order
- Other work: Surgeon

Alfred Herbert Horsfall DSO (29 January 1871 – 26 November 1944) was an Australian military surgeon.

== History ==
Horsfall was born at Fitzroy in Melbourne to headmaster Jonas Horsfall and Emily, née Nichols. He graduated from the University of Melbourne with a Master of Surgery in 1893 and soon moved to Newcastle, where he was appointed medical superintendent at Newcastle Hospital; he also became a local alderman and was elected president of the Newcastle Scientific Society. He was commissioned a lieutenant in the 2nd New South Wales Army Medical Corps Contingent in January 1900 and saw action during the Boer War, serving in the Orange Free State, the Transvaal and the Orange River Colony. He was mentioned in despatches and awarded the Distinguished Service Order for his service. After the war he returned to Newcastle. He married Gertrude Emily Stokes at Leichhardt in Sydney on 21 April 1903.

Horsfall continued to serve in the Medical Corps but he resigned as a major in 1914, enlisting in the British Territorial Army. He served in Greece and the Suez Canal during First World War, supervising the canal's sanitation and serving as surgeon specialist in Alexandria until January 1917, when he was sent to England as an invalid. He returned to active service in August, serving in Palestine until he was invalided again. He supervised the 82nd General Hospital in Salonika from March to October 1918. Following the end of the war Horsfall based himself in England but continued to travel widely. A staunch advocate of the British Empire, he published several pamphlets supporting migration and the Britishness of the dominions. He was in Australia from 1923 to 1926 (during which time he ran for the Australian House of Representatives as a Nationalist), and on returning to England he lectured for the Social and Political Education League. Horsfall died in London in 1944.
