= William Thompson (Australian politician) =

Irish-born Australian politician (1863–1953)

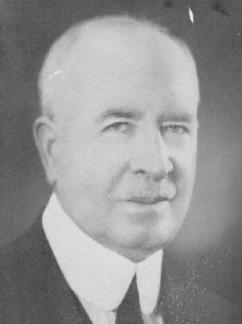

Senator for Queensland
- In office 16 December 1922 – 30 June 1932
- Preceded by: John MacDonald

Personal details
- Born: 2 March 1863 Lurgan, County Armagh, Ireland
- Died: 7 March 1953 (aged 90) Petersham, New South Wales, Australia
- Party: Nationalist (to 1931); UAP (from 1931)
- Occupation: Businessman, soldier

William George Thompson (2 March 1863 – 7 March 1953) was an Irish-born Australian politician. He served as a Senator for Queensland from 1922 to 1932, representing the Nationalist Party and United Australia Party.

== Early life ==
William Thompson was born in Lurgan, County Armagh, Ireland, on 2 March 1863. When he was 14 months old, his family immigrated to Australia. Thompson was educated at North Rockhampton State School in Rockhampton in Queensland.

At age 11, Thompson became an office boy for the merchant W. Jackson in Rockhampton. In 1881 he was the driving force to establish a branch of the Protestant Alliance Friendly Society at North Rockhampton and in December 1881, initiated a second branch in Rockhampton. In 1886, he established his own business called W.G. Thompson & Co, operating a bonded warehouse and other commercial activities. He was secretary of the Rockhampton General Hospital and of the Rockhampton Jockey Club. He became a colliery owner.

== Military service ==
In 1889 Thompson joined the Queensland Infantry as a private. He had attained the rank of acting captain when placed in charge of troops in the Clermont district during the 1891 Australian shearers' strike. In 1896 he was one of Queensland's two representatives sent in the Australian contingent to England with other colonial troops to commemorate the 60th year of Queen Victoria's reign.

=== Boer War ===
The Boer War broke out in 1899 and Thompson was placed second in command of the second Queensland contingent to go to South Africa. He left Rockhampton on Christmas night 1899 after an historic march through the city and a farewell dinner at the School of Arts. He was 13 times in action on the Veldt. There was no system of reinforcements at the time and wastage of war reduced the strength of the second Queensland to a subaltern's command. Thompson was then appointed magistrate of the High Court of Pretoria, where, with two other magistrates, he administered martial law. Pretoria, at that time, was a Boer city.

=== World War I ===
When World War I broke out, Thompson was 52, two years above the age for a field appointment. Instead he was put in charge of the largest training camp in Queensland at the Exhibition Grounds, Brisbane. He also spent 18 months commanding troops at sea in convoy work and sea transport.

In 1921 he retired with the rank of Brigadier General, only participating in ceremonial events from then on.

=== Decorations ===
His decorations include:

- Queen Victoria's Decoration 1899
- the Queen's Medal with three clasps
- two service medals for World War I
- the King George and Queen Mary's Jubilee medal

King Gustav, of Sweden, awarded him the decoration of Chevalier (1st class) of the Royal Order of Vasa. This was the equivalent in Sweden and on the Continent of a British knighthood, and was bestowed in recognition of services rendered by Thompson as vice-consul for Sweden at Rockhampton over many years.

== Politics ==
Thompson was elected to the North Rockhampton Town Council and was mayor in 1890.

In the 1918 Queensland state election, Thompson was a Nationalist candidate for the Queensland Legislative Assembly in the seat of Keppel, but was defeated by the sitting member James Larcombe (Labor), 1659 votes against 1130.

Following the death of Nationalist Senator John Adamson in May 1922, the Labor-controlled Queensland Government appointed Labor's John MacDonald, to temporarily fill Adamson's vacancy. The Australian Constitution dictated that an appointment to a casual senate vacancy was required to be re-contested at the next election, which meant there were four seats up for election in Queensland. Thompson was the fourth on the Nationalists ticket at the December 1922 Senate election and was elected to fill the vacancy for the balance of Adamson's term. Thompson was re-elected at the 1925 Senate election, but was defeated in the 1931 election.

== Later life ==
Thompson retired from his business activities in 1925 but continued to be involved in Rockhampton's civic organisations, including being President of the Rockhampton Chamber of Commerce for 16 years and President of the Rockhampton branch of the Red Cross. He was one of the founding members of the Rockhampton Club. He was also Chairman of the Bluff Colliery Company and the Central Queensland Coal Board.

Thompson moved to Sydney, New South Wales, in the 1940s where he died at Petersham on Saturday 7 March 1953. He was cremated at Sydney's North Suburbs Crematorium on Tuesday 10 March 1953.
