= Walter Massy-Greene =

Australian politician and businessman (1874–1952)

The Honourable Sir Walter Massy-Greene KCMG
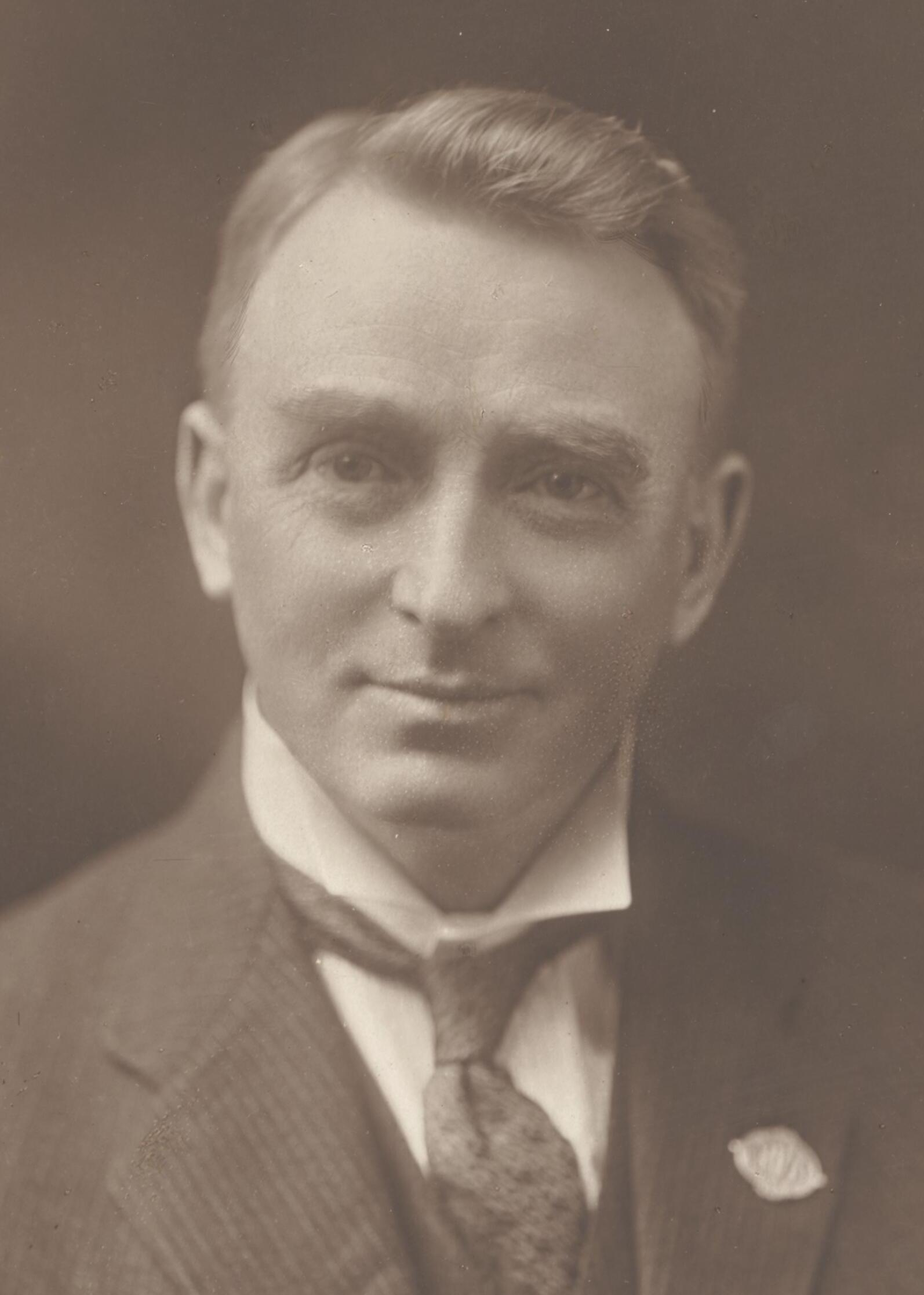

Minister for Defence
- In office 21 December 1921 – 9 February 1923
- Prime Minister: Billy Hughes
- Preceded by: George Pearce
- Succeeded by: Eric Bowden

Minister for Health
- In office 10 March 1921 – 9 February 1923
- Prime Minister: Billy Hughes
- Preceded by: New office
- Succeeded by: Austin Chapman

Minister for Trade and Customs
- In office 17 January 1919 – 21 December 1921
- Prime Minister: Billy Hughes
- Preceded by: William Watt
- Succeeded by: Arthur Rodgers

Senator for New South Wales
- In office 1 July 1926 – 30 June 1938
- In office 17 October 1923 – 13 November 1925
- Preceded by: Edward Millen

Member of the Australian Parliament for Richmond
- In office 13 April 1910 – 16 December 1922
- Preceded by: Thomas Ewing
- Succeeded by: Roland Green

Personal details
- Born: Walter Massy Greene; 6 November 1874 Camberwell, Surrey, England
- Died: 16 November 1952 (aged 78) East Melbourne, Victoria, Australia
- Party: Liberal (1910–16); Nationalist (1916–1929); Independent (1929); Australian (1929–1930); Nationalist (1930–1931); UAP (1931–38)
- Spouse: Lula Lomax (m. 1915)
- Occupation: Farmer, bank officer

Sir Walter Massy-Greene KCMG (6 November 1874 – 16 November 1952) was an Australian politician and businessman. As a Liberal and Nationalist member of the House of Representatives, he became a protégé of Prime Minister Billy Hughes and was groomed as his successor. He served as Minister for Trade and Customs (1919–1921), Defence (1921–1923), and Health (1921–1923), but his prime ministerial aspirations were brought to an abrupt halt by his defeat at the 1922 federal election. Massy-Greene subsequently served two terms as a Senator for New South Wales (1923–1925, 1926–1938), but never regained his earlier influence in politics. In retirement he held numerous company directorships.

== Early life ==
Walter Massy Greene was born on 6 November 1874 in Camberwell, England. He was the second son of Julia (née Sandeman) and John Greene, a brewer and hotel proprietor. His maternal grandfather was General Robert Turnbull Sandeman, and his uncle Robert Groves Sandeman was a colonial administrator in India. The family surname was Greene, but at some point Walter chose to treat his middle name as an additional surname; he officially added a hyphen in March 1933.

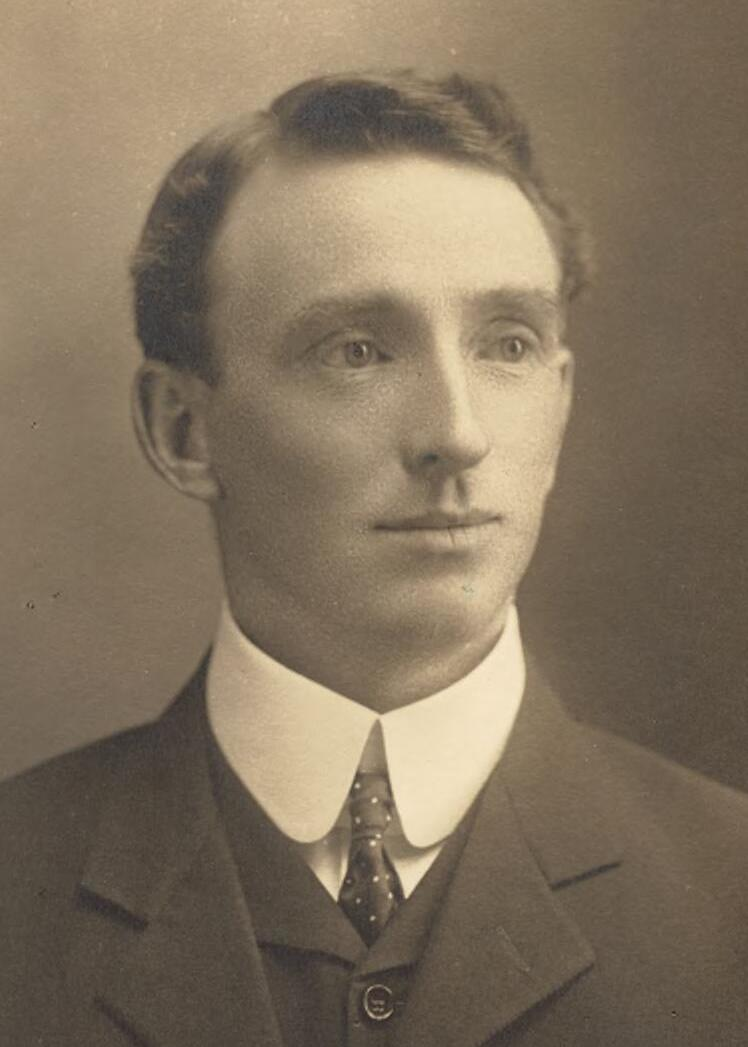
Massy-Greene at a young age

Greene grew up in Wimbledon before boarding at Lynton House College in Oxfordshire. He was sent to Australia in 1891 for health reasons, and worked as a farm and sawmill labourer in northern Tasmania for a period. He was later joined by his family, who took up land near Kyneton, Victoria. In 1895, Greene joined the Bank of New South Wales and was posted to the gold-rush town of Kalgoorlie, Western Australia. After a few years he joined the bank's head office in Sydney, and then was transferred to Lismore, New South Wales. From 1902, he farmed a property near Nimbin with his two brothers. He was elected to the newly created Terania Shire Council in 1906 and chosen as the inaugural shire president.

== Politics ==
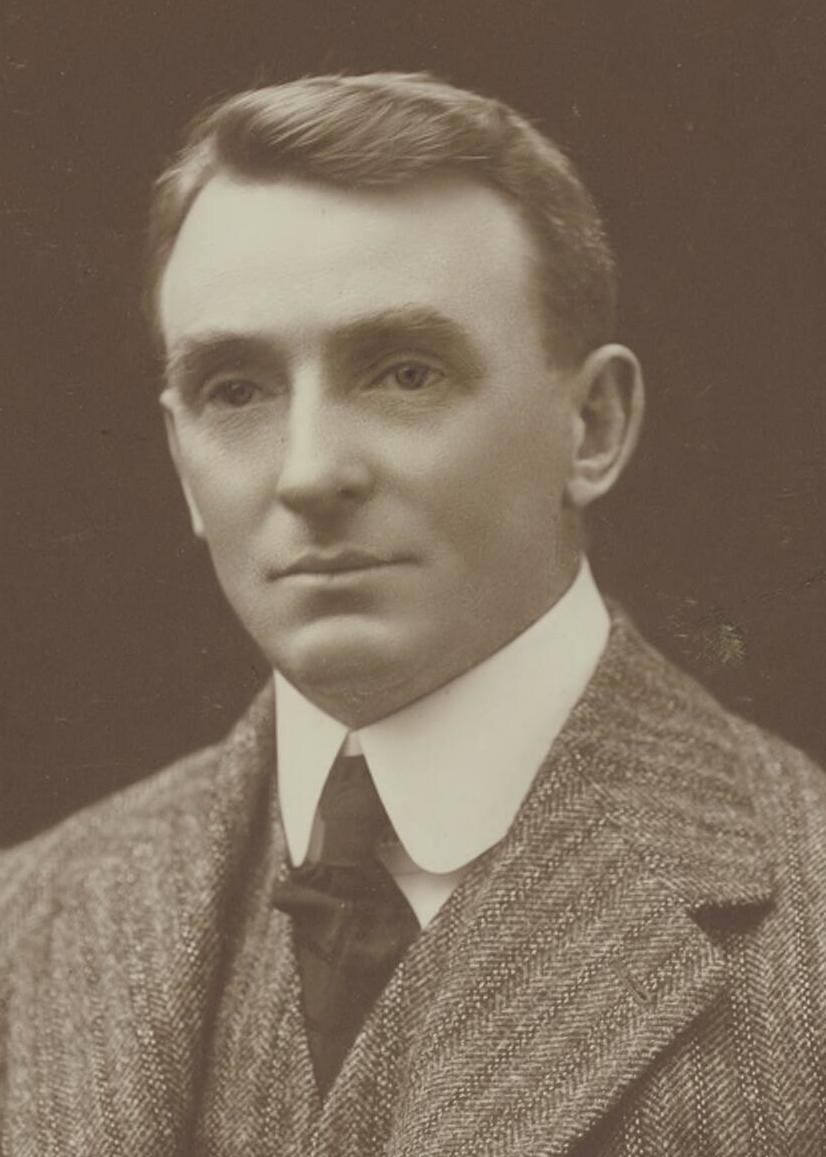
Massy-Greene, 1920s

=== Early years ===
Massy-Greene joined the newly created Federal Liberal League in 1909. At the 1910 federal election, he was elected to the Division of Richmond with the support of small farmers. He joined the parliamentary Liberal Party and soon became known for his attacks on the Fisher government's financial legislation. Massy-Greene retained his seat at the 1913 election, which saw the Liberals win a one-seat majority in the House of Representatives. He was appointed as party whip by Prime Minister Joseph Cook, and subsequently played a key role in maintaining party discipline.

=== Hughes government ===
In 1917, following the Australian Labor Party split of 1916, the Liberal Party and the National Labor Party formed a coalition and Massy-Greene became a member of the resultant Nationalist Party. He continued to represent Richmond until 1922 when he was defeated by a Country Party candidate. He was appointed as a Nationalist Party Senator for New South Wales in 1923 and served to the 1925 election, when he was elected to the Senate from July 1926. He remained in the Senate until his retirement in 1938.

In the fourth Hughes Ministry Massy-Greene was an Honorary Minister in charge of matters relating to price-fixing (27 March 1918 – 17 January 1919). He was then promoted to be Minister for Trade and Customs (17 January 1919 – 21 December 1921). On 10 March 1921 he became the first Minister for Health, a position he held until 5 February 1923. He then became Minister for Defence until 5 February 1923. He was relegated to the back bench during the Bruce Ministry.

=== Bruce–Page government and opposition ===
On 19 November 1929, Massy-Greene resigned from the Nationalist Party to protest the expulsion of four dissident MPs from the party – Hughes, Walter Marks, George Maxwell and Senator Walter Duncan. In a letter to Nationalist leader John Latham he stated "I have no desire to continue a membership with a party whose policy does not appeal to me; to be ground between the upper and nether millstone of a machine operated in the manner which appears acceptable to those who now control it".

After leaving the Nationalists, Massy-Greene joined the provisional committee of Hughes' new Australian Party on 5 December 1929, with he and Duncan its only representatives in the Senate. He resigned from the Australian Party on 26 December 1930 to rejoin the Nationalists. He subsequently joined the new United Australia Party in early 1931, along with Hughes and Duncan.

=== Lyons government ===
In the First Lyons Ministry he became the minister assisting the Leader of the Government in the Senate (6 January 1932 – 23 June 1932) and Assistant Treasurer (6 January 1932 – 25 September 1933).

He was appointed a Knight Commander of the Order of St Michael and St George in June 1933, in recognition of his service as Assistant Treasurer. He subsequently formally changed his surname to Massy-Greene to reflect his usage over the previous two decades.

== Later life ==
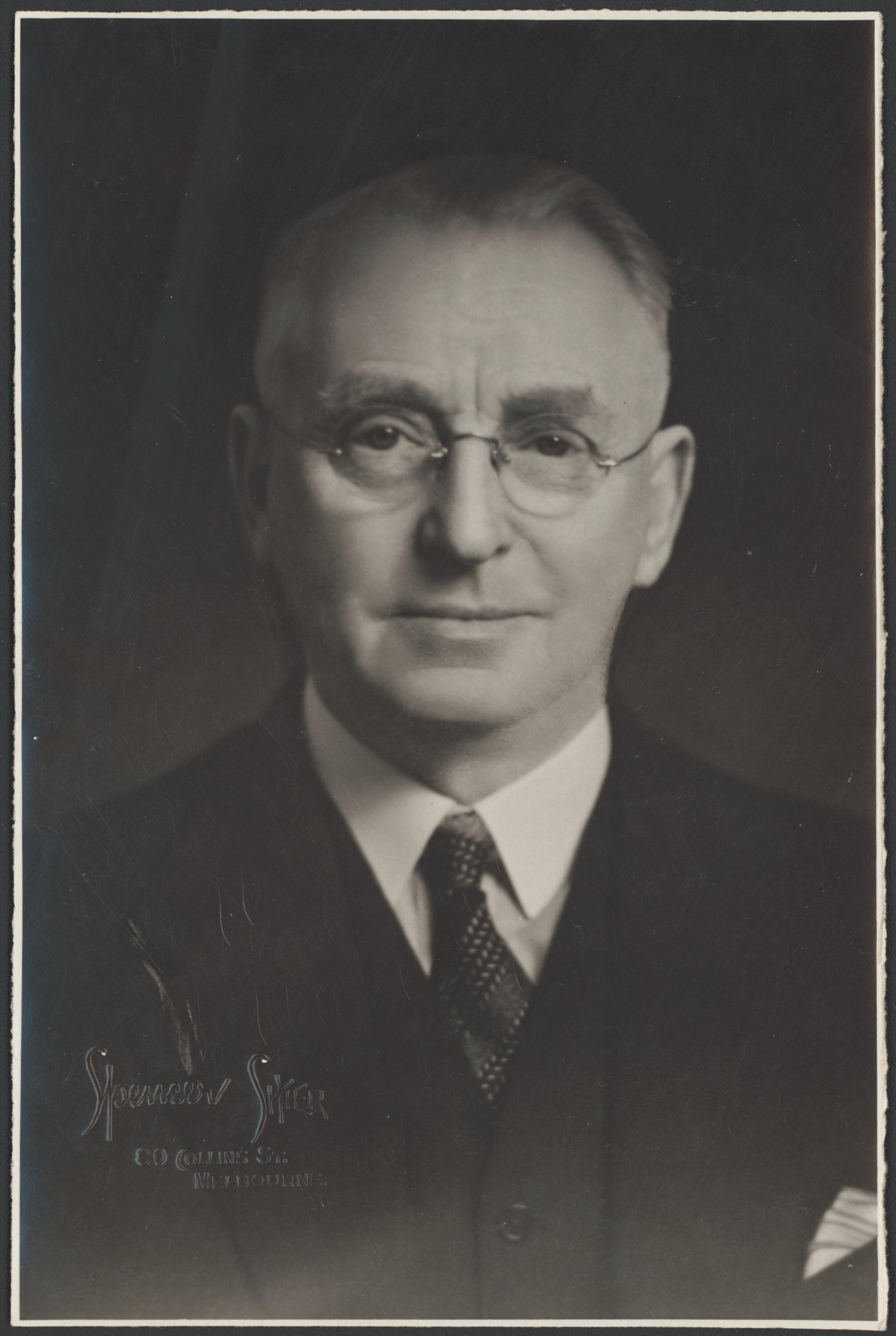
Massy-Greene in 1938

=== Business career ===
In 1936, Massy-Greene became chairman of Associated Pulp and Paper Mills on its formation, a post which he held until his death. He was also the chairman of the Emu Bay Railway and a director of Electrolytic Zinc, Felt and Textiles of Australia Ltd., Yarra Falls Ltd., and many other companies.

=== Other activities ===
During World War II, Massy-Greene served as chairman of the Treasury Finance Committee and as a member of the National Security Capital Issues Advisory Board and Defence Board of Business Administration. In 1940, he led the Australian delegation to the Eastern Group Supply Conference which led to the creation of the Eastern Group Supply Council. Although he never attended university, Massy-Greene also served on the University of Melbourne council from 1939 to 1949, including as deputy chancellor from 1945 to 1947.

== Personal life ==
Massy-Greene married Lula May Lomax in Mungindi, New South Wales on 6 February 1915. The couple had three children together. His son Sir Brian Massy-Greene served as chairman of the Commonwealth Bank.

After the deaths of George Pearce and Billy Hughes in 1952, Massy-Greene was the sole survivor of the Hughes Nationalist ministries. On 13 November 1952, he was admitted to Freemasons Hospital, Melbourne, where he underwent an operation on his gall bladder the following day. After "progressing satisfactorily" he died on 16 November. A state funeral was held at St John's Anglican Church, Toorak, before a cremation at Springvale Botanical Cemetery.

Political offices
Preceded by William Watt	Minister for Trade and Customs; 1919–1921	Succeeded by Arthur Rodgers
Preceded by George Pearce	Minister for Defence; 1921–1923	Succeeded by Eric Bowden
New title Split from Trade and Customs	Minister for Health; 1921–1923	Succeeded by Austin Chapman
Parliament of Australia
Preceded by Thomas Ewing	Member for Richmond; 1910–1922	Succeeded by Roland Green
