= Malcolm Cameron (Australian politician) =

Australian politician

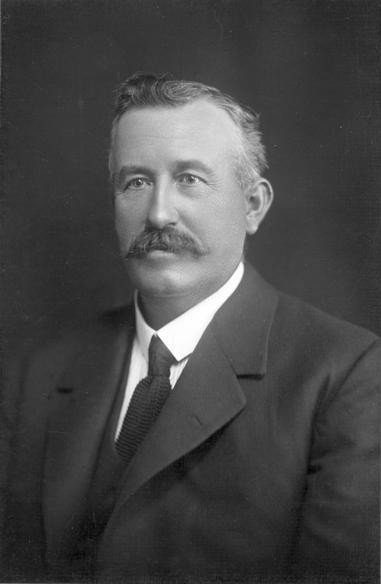

Member of the Australian Parliament for Barker
- In office 16 December 1922 – 7 August 1934
- Preceded by: John Livingston
- Succeeded by: Archie Cameron

Personal details
- Born: 12 July 1873 German Creek, South Australia
- Died: 1 March 1935 (aged 61) Glencoe, South Australia
- Party: Liberal (1922–25); Nationalist (1925–31); UAP (1931–34)

Malcolm Duncan Cameron (12 July 1873 – 1 March 1935) was an Australian politician. He was a member of the Australian House of Representatives from 1922 to 1934, representing the electorate of Barker for the Nationalist Party (1922–1931) and its successor the United Australia Party (1931–1934).

Cameron was born at German Creek, where his father managed a pastoral property, and was educated at the Tantanoola school. He began farming at German Creek, before acquiring property at Glencoe when John Riddoch divided the former Glencoe Station. He was clerk of the District Council of Tantanoola for twenty years, president of the local progress association, president of the Glencoe branch of the Agricultural Bureau, vice-president of the Mount Gambier Agricultural and Horticultural Society, and one of the key figures in the construction of the district hall and a member of its committee. He was credited with much of the responsibility for the development of the Glencoe railway line. He was a prominent member of the Farmers and Producers Political Union and later served as president of the local branch of its successor, the Liberal Union.

Cameron was elected to the House of Representatives at the 1922 federal election during a bitter split in the Nationalist Party in South Australia, which saw the party's two state affiliates, the Liberal Union and National Party, run competing tickets at that year's federal election. Cameron ousted the incumbent MP, John Livingston, for Liberal Union preselection, after the party's Barker district committee voted to endorse him over Livingston without a plebiscite. The National Party did not contest the seat and Livingston retired after losing preselection, and Cameron went on to narrowly win the seat against Labor on Country Party preferences.

He was re-elected at five successive elections, and served as a member of the Standing Committee on Public Works, including a stint as chairman. Cameron suffered a serious illness early in 1934, and though he initially recovered enough to be endorsed to stand again at the 1934 federal election, his illness recurred and he was forced to withdraw his candidacy in July and retire. He was confined to his bed for six months prior to his death in March 1935, and was buried at the Mount Gambier Cemetery.

== Notes ==
Parliament of Australia
Preceded by John Livingston	Member for Barker; 1922 – 1934	Succeeded by Archie Cameron
