= 1925 Australian federal election =

- 14 November 1925

All 76 (Note: The Northern Territory had one seat, but members for the territories did not have full voting rights until 1966 and did not count toward government formation.) seats in the House of Representatives 38 seats were needed for a majority in the House 22 (of the 36) seats in the Senate
- Registered: 3,302,016 ▲10.79%
- Turnout: 2,987,200 (91.39%) (Note: Turnout in contested seats) (▲32.03 pp)
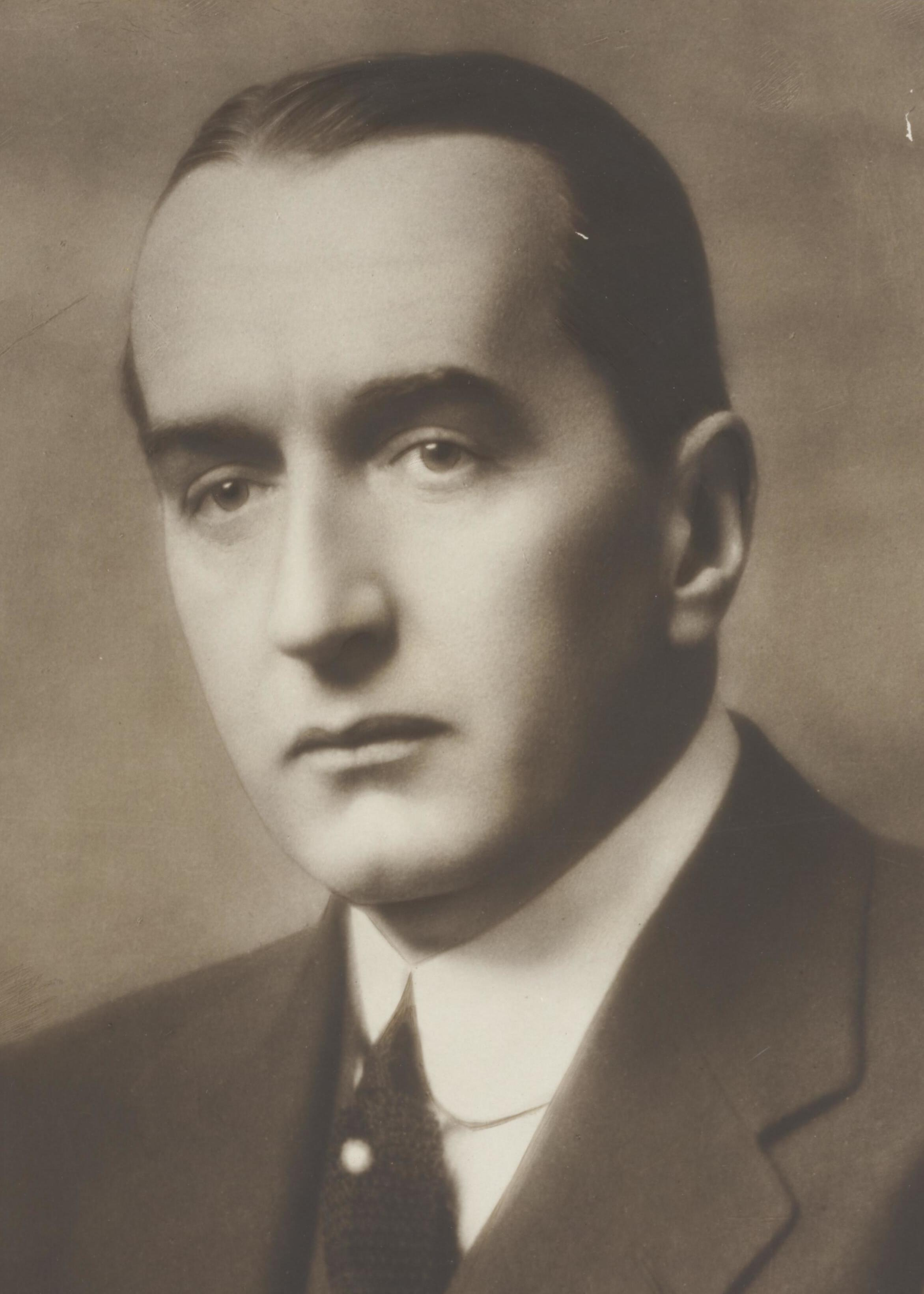

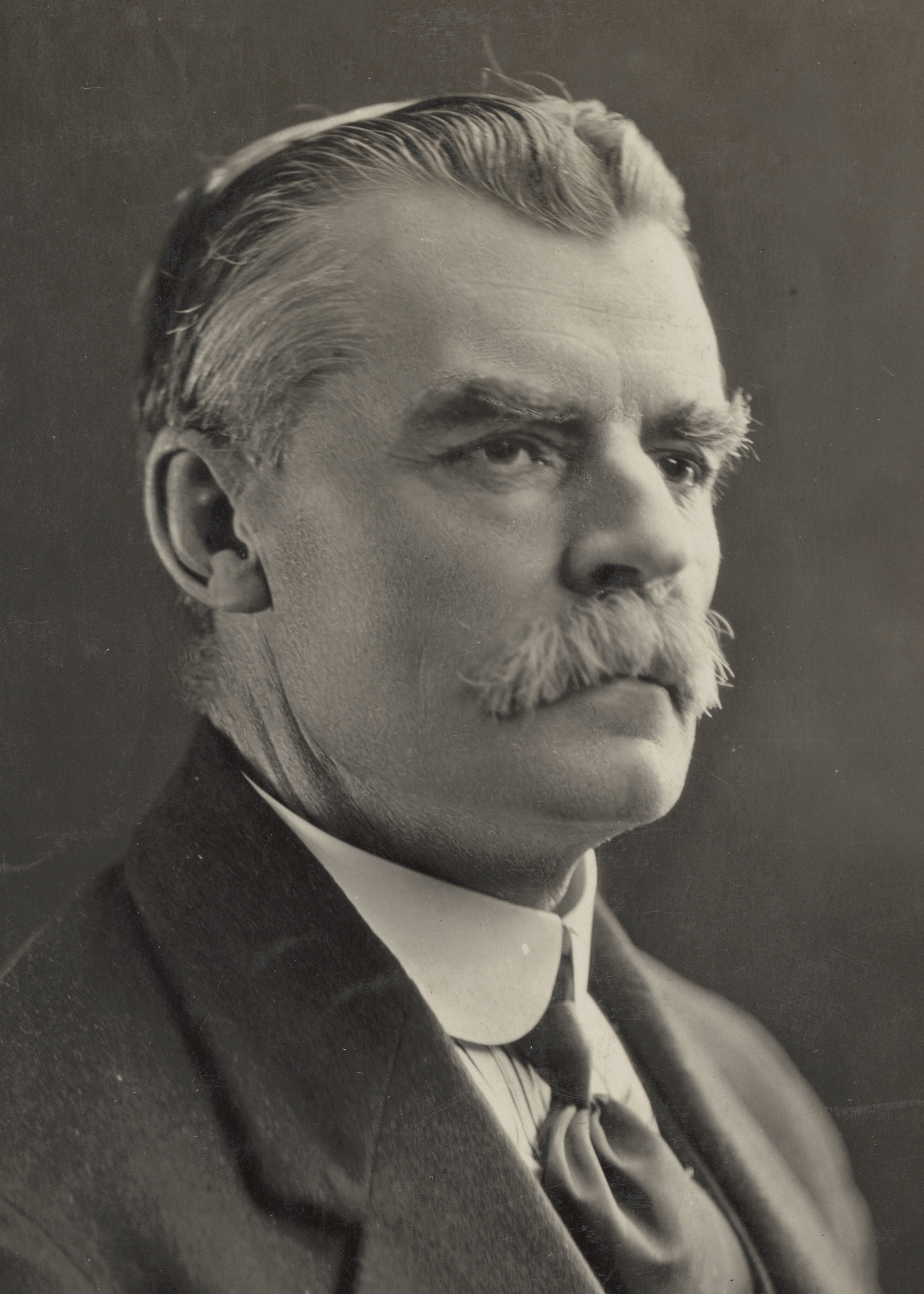

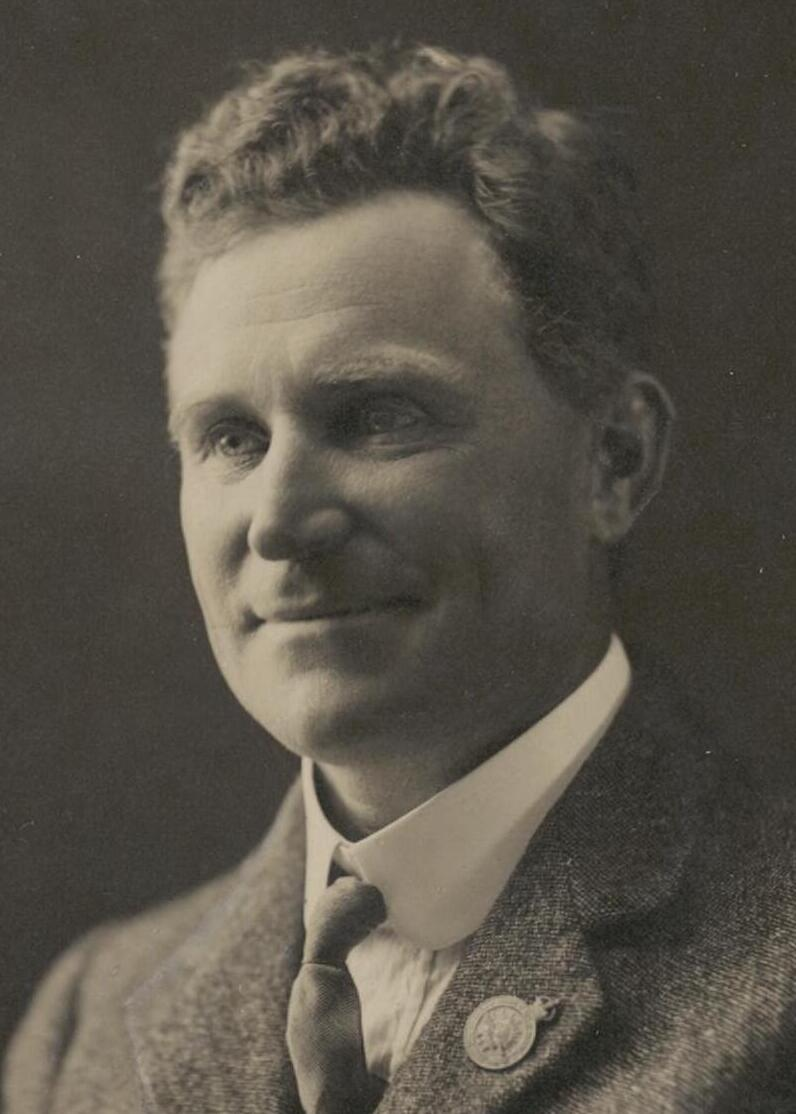
	First party	Second party	Third party
Leader	Stanley Bruce	Matthew Charlton	Earle Page
Party	Nationalist	Labor	Country
Leader since	9 February 1923	16 May 1922	5 April 1921
Leader's seat	Flinders (Vic.)	Hunter (NSW)	Cowper (NSW)
Last election	26 seats	29 seats	14 seats
Seats won	37 seats	23 seats + NT	13 seats
Seat change	▲11	▼6	▼1
Primary vote	1,238,397	1,313,627	313,363
Percentage	42.46%	45.04%	10.74%
Swing	▲7.23%	▲2.74%	▼1.82%
- Results by division for the House of Representatives, shaded by winning party's margin of victory.
Prime Minister before election
Stanley Bruce
Nationalist/Country coalition
Subsequent Prime Minister
Stanley Bruce
Nationalist/Country coalition

The 1925 Australian federal election was held in Australia on 14 November 1925. All 75 seats in the House of Representatives and 22 of the 36 seats in the Senate were up for election. The incumbent Nationalist–Country coalition, led by Prime Minister Stanley Bruce, defeated the opposition Labor Party led by Matthew Charlton in a landslide. This was the first time any party had won a fourth consecutive federal election.

Compulsory voting for federal elections was introduced in 1924 and first used in the 1925 elections, where 91.4% of the electorate cast a vote, compared to 59.4% at the 1922 elections.

== Background ==
=== Anti-Labor electoral pact ===
In 1924, Bruce and Page formulated an electoral pact between the Nationalist Party and Country Party, whereby each party agreed not to oppose incumbent candidates from the other party and to co-operate to choose the strongest candidate in seats held by the ALP. Both parties agreed to accept the pact, although only after both Bruce and Page made clear they would resign as party leaders if the pact was rejected. The pact proved particularly controversial within the Country Party, with cabinet minister Percy Stewart resigning in protest and some members of the organisational wing seeing it as an attack on the party's independence.

=== Introduction of compulsory voting ===
The 1925 federal election was the first at which compulsory voting applied, following the passage of a private senator's bill introduced by Herbert Payne in 1924. Both the government and opposition supported Payne's bill, which had been introduced in response to a substantial decrease in voter turnout at the 1922 election.

== Campaign issues ==
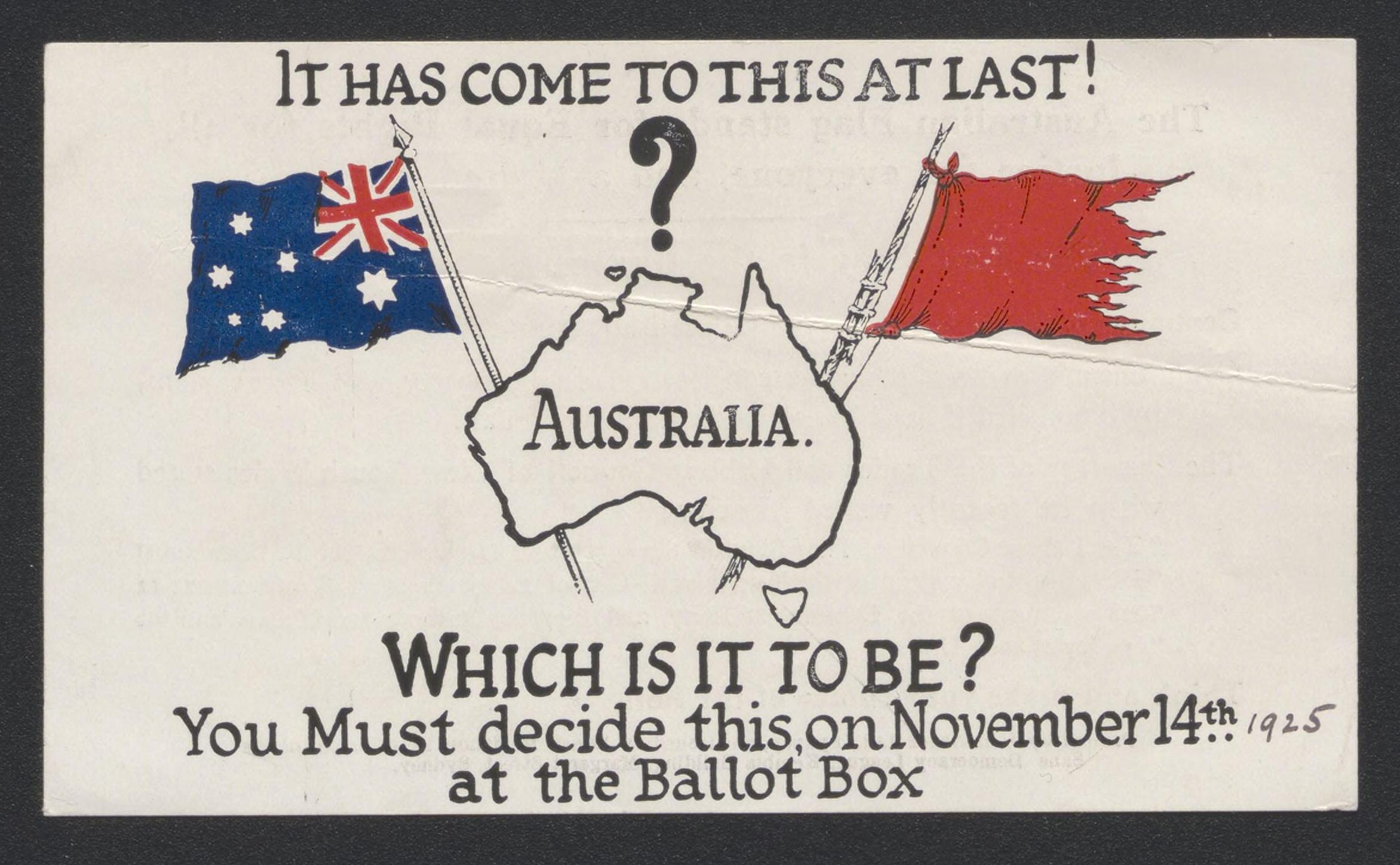
Anti-communist campaign material used by the Bruce–Page government

The government made industrial relations and law and order central issues in the election campaign, largely in response to industrial unrest in the maritime industry. In June 1925, the Commonwealth Court of Conciliation and Arbitration had deregistered the Seamen's Union of Australia, in response to what it viewed as illegal industrial action that had disrupted Australia's trade-reliant economy. The union subsequently called a seven-week strike. In response, the government rapidly passed the Immigration Act 1925 and Navigation Act 1925, allowing it to deport foreign-born union leaders and to use foreign seamen as strikebreakers.

Bruce and the Nationalists also made Red Scare tactics a key part of their campaign for the first time, attributing the strikes to "militant union leaders intent on spreading revolutionary, Bolshevik or communist ideas" rather than merely workers intent on improving their employment campaigns. He presented the government as a bulwark against communism and appealed in campaign speeches to the "men and women of moderate sane views", promising a "moderate, sensible, middle way" in response to what he saw as the ALP's political extremism.

Both Bruce and opposition leader Matthew Charlton reaffirmed their support for the White Australia policy during the election campaign. Bruce stated that "we intend to keep this country white and not allow its people to be faced with the problems that at present are practically insoluble in many parts of the world". Charlton called for "the development of our race in body, in mind and social status" and pledged "a continuance of the present embargo against the introduction of black grown sugar in Australia" to protect the status of Australia as "the only country in the world where cane sugar is produced by white labour".

== Results ==
Labor: 23 seats Nationalist: 37 seats Country : 13 seats Independent: 2 seats

For the first time since the inaugural federal election in 1901, no female candidates stood for either house of parliament.

=== House of Representatives ===
House of Reps (IRV) – 1925–28 – Turnout 91.39% (CV) – Informal 2.36%
Party	First preference Votes	%	Swing	Seats	Change
Nationalist–Country coalition	1,551,760	53.20	+5.41	51	+11
Nationalist	1,238,397	42.46	+7.23	37	+11
Country	313,363	10.74	–1.82	13	–1
Labor	1,313,627	45.04	+2.74	24 (Note: Including Northern Territory)	–6
Independents	51,251	1.76	–2.80	2	+1
Total	2,916,638			76	
Two-party-preferred (estimated)
Nationalist–Country coalition	Win	53.80	+2.60	51	+11
Labor		46.20	−2.60	23	–6

Notes

- Independents: Percy Stewart (Wimmera, Vic.), William Watson (Fremantle, WA).
- Labor lost Kennedy, Qld., when the sitting member Charles McDonald died on the day before the election, leading to his opponent Grosvenor Francis being declared elected unopposed.

First preference vote
Labor	45.04%
Nationalist	42.46%
Country	10.74%
Others	1.76%

Two-party-preferred vote
Coalition	53.80%
Labor	46.20%

Parliament seats
Coalition	68.00%
Labor	30.67%
Others	2.67%

=== Senate ===
Senate (P BV) – 1925–28 – Turnout 91.31% (CV) – Informal 6.96%
Party	First preference votes	%	Swing	Seats won	Seats held	Change
Nationalist–Country coalition	1,537,282	54.81	N/A	22	28	N/A
Nationalist	1,272,127	45.35	+9.12	18	24	0
Country	265,155	9.45	–3.53	4	4	+4
Labor	1,262,912	45.02	–0.67	0	8	–4
Independents	4,808	0.17	–1.87	0	0	0
Total	2,805,002			22	36	

== Seats changing hands ==
Seat	Pre-1925			Swing	Post-1925		
Seat	Party	Member	Margin	Swing	Margin	Member	Party
Angas, SA	Labor	Moses Gabb	8.0	8.3	0.3	Walter Parsons	Nationalist
Barton, NSW	Labor	Frederick McDonald	7.6	8.6	1.0	Thomas Ley	Nationalist
Darwin, Tas	Country	Joshua Whitsitt	0.4	10.9	10.5*	George Bell	Nationalist
Denison, Tas	Labor	David O'Keefe	0.4	2.6	2.2	John Gellibrand	Nationalist
Gwydir, NSW	Labor	Lou Cunningham	0.1	3.2	3.1	Aubrey Abbott	Country
Kennedy, Qld	Labor	Charles McDonald	N/A	100.0	100.0	Grosvenor Francis	Nationalist
Wannon, Vic	Labor	John McNeill	0.8	4.8	4.0	Arthur Rodgers	Nationalist
Wimmera, Vic	Country	Percy Stewart	21.2	77.8	27.8	Percy Stewart	Independent

- Members listed in italics did not contest their seat at this election.
- *Figure is Nationalist versus Labor.

== Post-election pendulum ==
Government seats
Nationalist/Country coalition
Marginal
Angas (SA)	Walter Parsons	NAT	0.3
Herbert (Qld)	Lewis Nott	NAT	0.3
Barton (NSW)	Thomas Ley	NAT	1.0
Macquarie (NSW)	Arthur Manning	NAT	1.3
Denison (Tas)	John Gellibrand	NAT	2.2
Maranoa (Qld)	James Hunter	CP	2.6
Gwydir (NSW)	Aubrey Abbott	CP	3.1
Bendigo (Vic)	Geoffry Hurry	NAT	3.5
Wannon (Vic)	Arthur Rodgers	NAT	4.0
Riverina (NSW)	William Killen	CP	4.3
Brisbane (Qld)	Donald Cameron	NAT	5.5
Corangamite (Vic)	William Gibson	CP	5.5
Franklin (Tas)	Alfred Seabrook	NAT	5.6
Oxley (Qld)	James Bayley	NAT	5.7
Lang (NSW)	Elliot Johnson	NAT	5.9
Fairly safe
Corio (Vic)	John Lister	NAT	6.7
Indi (Vic)	Robert Cook	CP	6.7
Wilmot (Tas)	Llewellyn Atkinson	CP	7.0
Boothby (SA)	Jack Duncan-Hughes	NAT	7.6
Bass (Tas)	Syd Jackson	NAT	8.3
New England (NSW)	Victor Thompson	CP	8.5
Fawkner (Vic)	George Maxwell	NAT	9.4
Calare (NSW)	Neville Howse	NAT	9.8
Safe
Darwin (Tas)	George Bell	NAT	10.5
Forrest (WA)	John Prowse	CP	10.9
Henty (Vic)	Henry Gullett	NAT	10.9
Barker (SA)	Malcolm Cameron	NAT	11.6
Robertson (NSW)	Sydney Gardner	NAT	12.6
Flinders (Vic)	Stanley Bruce	NAT	12.7
Parkes (NSW)	Charles Marr	NAT	12.8
Perth (WA)	Edward Mann	NAT	12.8
Darling Downs (Qld)	Littleton Groom	NAT	13.1
Gippsland (Vic)	Thomas Paterson	CP	13.1
Moreton (Qld)	Josiah Francis	NAT	13.2
Wentworth (NSW)	Walter Marks	NAT	14.4
Wide Bay (Qld)	Edward Corser	NAT	14.5
Eden-Monaro (NSW)	Austin Chapman	NAT	14.6
Lilley (Qld)	George Mackay	NAT	14.7
Martin (NSW)	Herbert Pratten	NAT	14.8
Wakefield (SA)	Richard Foster	NAT	14.8
Echuca (Vic)	William Hill	CP	15.3
Parramatta (NSW)	Eric Bowden	NAT	15.7
Swan (WA)	Henry Gregory	CP	16.2
Kooyong (Vic)	John Latham	NAT	17.7
Richmond (NSW)	Roland Green	CP	17.7
Balaclava (Vic)	William Watt	NAT	19.7
Very safe
Cowper (NSW)	Earle Page	CP	20.0
North Sydney (NSW)	Billy Hughes	NAT	21.5
Warringah (NSW)	Granville Ryrie	NAT	30.1
Kennedy (Qld)	Grosvenor Francis	NAT	Unopposed

Non-government seats
Australian Labor Party
Marginal
Adelaide (SA)	George Edwin Yates	ALP	0.9
South Sydney (NSW)	Edward Riley	ALP	1.1
Ballaarat (Vic)	Charles McGrath	ALP	1.3
Capricornia (Qld)	Frank Forde	ALP	1.9
Hume (NSW)	Parker Moloney	ALP	2.0
Grey (SA)	Andrew Lacey	ALP	2.6
Werriwa (NSW)	Bert Lazzarini	ALP	3.7
East Sydney (NSW)	John West	ALP	3.8
Reid (NSW)	Percy Coleman	ALP	4.7
Fairly safe
Kalgoorlie (WA)	Albert Green	ALP	7.6
Batman (Vic)	Frank Brennan	ALP	9.0
Maribyrnong (Vic)	James Fenton	ALP	9.5
Safe
Northern Territory (NT)	Harold Nelson	ALP	12.4
Bourke (Vic)	Frank Anstey	ALP	12.5
Newcastle (NSW)	David Watkins	ALP	12.5
Dalley (NSW)	William Mahony	ALP	14.1
Hindmarsh (SA)	Norman Makin	ALP	15.2
Darling (NSW)	Arthur Blakeley	ALP	15.5
Melbourne (Vic)	William Maloney	ALP	17.0
Melbourne Ports (Vic)	James Mathews	ALP	17.7
Cook (NSW)	Edward Charles Riley	ALP	17.8
Very safe
Hunter (NSW)	Matthew Charlton	ALP	21.3
West Sydney (NSW)	William Lambert	ALP	24.0
Yarra (Vic)	James Scullin	ALP	24.8
Independents
Fremantle (WA)	William Watson	IND	8.1 v ALP
Wimmera (Vic)	Percy Stewart	IND	27.8 v IND

== See also ==
- Candidates of the Australian federal election, 1925
- Members of the Australian House of Representatives, 1925–1928
- Members of the Australian Senate, 1926–1929
