= Liberal Union (Victoria) =

- President: Charles Merrett
- Founder: Thomas Ashworth; Charles Merrett
- Founded: 10 August 1922; 103 years ago
- Dissolved: 1925; 101 years ago
- Split from: Nationalist Party
- Preceded by: Liberal Party
- Merged into: Nationalist Party
- Succeeded by: Australian Liberal Party
- House of Representatives: 2 / 75 (1922−1925)

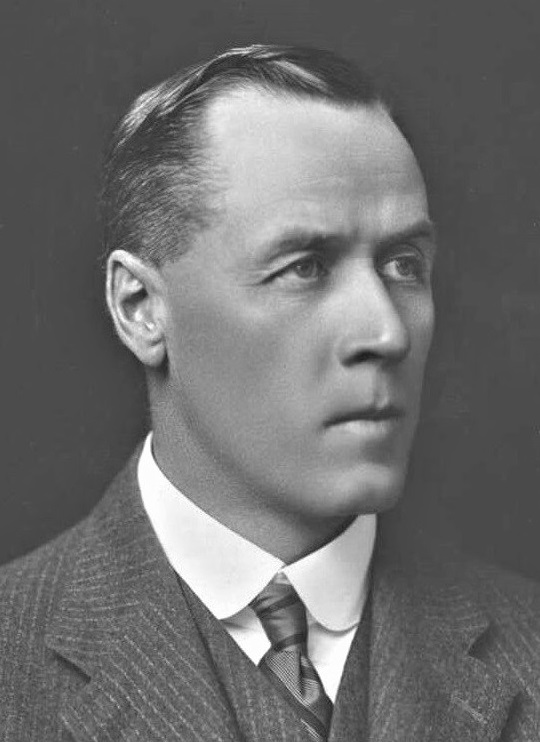
John Latham (Kooyong) was one of two people elected as Independent Liberal Union MPs

The Liberal Union, also known as the Liberal Party, the Liberal Union Party or the Progressive Liberals, was a short-lived political party in Australia that operated in Victoria, mainly in 1922.

== History ==
The Liberal Union was formed by disaffected Nationalists, principally Thomas Ashworth and Charles Merrett, who opposed the leadership of Prime Minister Billy Hughes.

In October 1922, Merrett met with delegates from the Country Party and Australian Legion and agreed to co-operate at the 1922 federal election. Positions agreed upon by the three parties included "[maintaining] the unity of the British Empire" and "the preservation of a white Australia". Candidates in Melbourne would stand as 'Progressive Liberals,' while the Liberals would back Country Party candidate in regional Victoria.

At the 1922 election, William Watt (Balaclava) and John Latham (Kooyong) were elected as Independent Liberal Union MPs. Other candidates for the party included Eleanor Glencross and Henry Gullett, both in Henty, and Merrett who ran in the Senate.

The party disbanded in 1925, after Watt re-joined and Latham joined the Nationalists. Merrett later formed the Australian Liberal Party.
