= Roland Green (politician) =

Australian politician

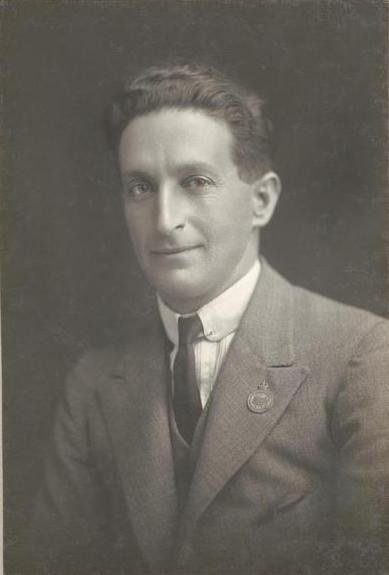

Member of the Australian Parliament for Richmond
- In office 16 December 1922 – 23 October 1937
- Preceded by: Walter Massy-Greene
- Succeeded by: Larry Anthony

Personal details
- Born: 29 October 1885
- Died: 27 April 1947 (aged 61)
- Party: Australian Country Party

Roland Frederick Herbert Green (29 October 1885 – 27 April 1947) was an Australian politician. He was a Country Party member of the Australian House of Representatives from 1922 to 1937, representing the electorate of Richmond in New South Wales.

Green was born at Emmaville in the Northern Tablelands, where his father was manager of Nebea Station, and was educated at Tamworth Public School and Sydney Boys High School, where he matriculated in 1902. He spent time working on a rubber plantation in eastern Peru and in an exploration party in Nigeria, and visited England, Canada and the United States to learn about agriculture then did dairying work on the North Coast of New South Wales. He studied at the University of Sydney from 1902, and after graduation worked as an assistant stock inspector in Armidale; he also took up a farm, "Pine Vale", at Woolomin.

After six years in the army reserve with the Australian Light Horse, Green enlisted in the military at the outbreak of World War I and embarked as a lieutenant in the 6th Light Horse Regiment on the Suevic on 21 December 1914. He saw service in Egypt, at the Battle of Gallipoli and on the Western Front; he was shot once at Gallipoli, recuperated with a long hospital stay and return to Australia in 1916, before re-embarking in November 1916. He served until again injured when he lost a leg at the Battle of Menin Road in Belgium, in September 1917. He returned to Australia on 30 June 1918 and returned to his farm at Woolomin. He was a co-founder and the first vice-president of the Limbless and Maimed Soldiers' Association, a member of the Tamworth Pastures Protection Board, and was an unsuccessful Progressive Party candidate at the 1922 state election.

To general surprise, Green won the House of Representatives seat of Richmond for the Country Party at the December 1922 election, defeating the sitting member and government minister Walter Massy-Greene. Green used an ingenious punning campaign slogan: "Vote for the Green without an E" (i.e. "a knee"). Lack of an E in his name also gave him precedence on the ballot paper over Massy-Greene (who had not adopted a hyphenated surname at that time). In 1927, he was credited as the "prime mover" behind an increase in the butter tariff. He remained the member for Richmond until his defeat at the 1937 election by Larry Anthony (senior), another Country Party candidate.

Green had relocated to Manly in Sydney during the 1920s, and after leaving politics studied law at the University of Sydney; enrolling at 53, he was claimed at the time to have been the oldest student in the history of the Sydney Law School. He was subsequently admitted to the bar in March 1942, and worked as a barrister until ill health caused him to cease practice in June 1946. He made three attempts at re-entering politics, as a Country Party candidate at the 1938 state election, an abortive Country Party Senate preselection bid at the 1943 federal election, and unsuccessful Liberal preselection attempt at the a resulting by-election. He died at the Prince of Wales Hospital in Sydney in April 1947 at the age of 61.

Parliament of Australia
Preceded by Walter Massy-Greene	Member for Richmond; 1922–1937	Succeeded by Larry Anthony
