= 1929 Australian House of Representatives election =

Australian federal election, 12 October 1929 House of Representatives << 1928–1931 >>
Enrolled voters	3,539,120				
Votes cast	2,957,549		Turnout	94.85	+1.21
Informal votes	78,299		Informal	2.65	–2.25
Summary of votes by party
Party	Primary votes	%	Swing	Seats	Change
Labor	1,406,327	48.84%	+4.20%	46	+ 15
Nationalist	975,979	33.90%	–5.20%	14	– 15
Country	295,640	10.27%	–0.20%	10	– 3
Country Progressive	27,942	0.97%	–0.64%	1	± 0
Independent	173,362	6.02%	+1.83%	4	+ 3
Total	2,879,250			75	

This is a list of electoral division results for the Australian 1929 federal election.

== New South Wales ==
=== Barton ===
1929 Australian federal election: Barton
Party	Candidate	Votes	%	±%
Labor	James Tully	43,207	67.6	+11.3
Nationalist	William Myhill	20,722	32.4	−11.3
Total formal votes		63,929	97.5	
Informal votes		1,596	2.5	
Turnout		65,535	97.3	
Labor hold		Swing	+11.3	

=== Calare ===
1929 Australian federal election: Calare
Party	Candidate	Votes	%	±%
Labor	George Gibbons	20,492	51.6	+12.3
Nationalist	Sir Neville Howse	19,252	48.4	−12.3
Total formal votes		39,744	96.7	
Informal votes		1,376	3.3	
Turnout		41,120	95.8	
Labor gain from Nationalist		Swing	+12.3	

=== Cook ===
1929 Australian federal election: Cook
Party	Candidate	Votes	%	±%
Labor	Edward Riley	34,221	84.2	+8.7
Nationalist	William Pickup	6,409	15.8	−8.7
Total formal votes		40,630	97.0	
Informal votes		1,263	3.0	
Turnout		41,893	95.3	
Labor hold		Swing	+8.7	

=== Cowper ===
1929 Australian federal election: Cowper
Party	Candidate	Votes	%	±%
Country	Earle Page	unopposed		
Country hold		Swing		

=== Dalley ===
1929 Australian federal election: Dalley
Party	Candidate	Votes	%	±%
Labor	Ted Theodore	31,276	77.9	+13.7
Nationalist	Thomas Morrow	8,870	22.1	+1.8
Total formal votes		40,146	97.3	
Informal votes		1,126	2.7	
Turnout		41,272	96.2	
Labor hold		Swing	+3.6	

=== Darling ===
1929 Australian federal election: Darling
Party	Candidate	Votes	%	±%
Labor	Arthur Blakeley	24,124	70.2	−0.7
Nationalist	Brian Doe	10,259	29.8	+0.7
Total formal votes		34,383	96.6	
Informal votes		1,215	3.4	
Turnout		35,598	90.0	
Labor hold		Swing	−0.7	

=== East Sydney ===
1929 Australian federal election: East Sydney
Party	Candidate	Votes	%	±%
Labor	John West	25,105	68.4	+10.0
Nationalist	Hyman Diamond	11,583	31.6	−10.0
Total formal votes		36,688	96.2	
Informal votes		1,451	3.8	
Turnout		38,139	89.1	
Labor hold		Swing	+10.0	

=== Eden-Monaro ===
1929 Australian federal election: Eden-Monaro
Party	Candidate	Votes	%	±%
Labor	John Cusack	19,732	50.1	+7.7
Nationalist	John Perkins	19,692	49.9	−7.7
Total formal votes		39,424	97.0	
Informal votes		1,233	3.0	
Turnout		40,657	93.6	
Labor gain from Nationalist		Swing	+7.7	

=== Gwydir ===
1929 Australian federal election: Gwydir
Party	Candidate	Votes	%	±%
Labor	Lou Cunningham	20,873	53.7	+6.0
Country	Aubrey Abbott	18,014	46.3	−6.0
Total formal votes		38,887	97.9	
Informal votes		831	2.1	
Turnout		39,718	92.7	
Labor gain from Country		Swing	+6.0	

=== Hume ===
1929 Australian federal election: Hume
Party	Candidate	Votes	%	±%
Labor	Parker Moloney	23,144	56.6	+3.9
Country	Thomas Fitzpatrick	17,743	43.4	+16.1
Total formal votes		40,887	97.9	
Informal votes		878	2.1	
Turnout		41,765	95.9	
Labor hold		Swing	+1.9	

=== Hunter ===
1929 Australian federal election: Hunter
Party	Candidate	Votes	%	±%
Labor	Rowley James	unopposed		
Labor hold		Swing		

=== Lang ===
1929 Australian federal election: Lang
Party	Candidate	Votes	%	±%
Labor	William Long	28,898	66.2	+12.7
Nationalist	Dick Dein	14,736	33.8	−12.7
Total formal votes		43,634	97.4	
Informal votes		1,150	2.6	
Turnout		44,784	94.3	
Labor hold		Swing	+12.7	

=== Macquarie ===
1929 Australian federal election: Macquarie
Party	Candidate	Votes	%	±%
Labor	Ben Chifley	25,349	65.6	+10.7
Nationalist	Charles Dash	13,271	34.4	−10.7
Total formal votes		38,620	97.0	
Informal votes		1,204	2.0	
Turnout		39,824	96.0	
Labor hold		Swing	+10.7	

=== Martin ===
1929 Australian federal election: Martin
Party	Candidate	Votes	%	±%
Labor	John Eldridge	31,804	51.73	+8.61
Nationalist	Graham Pratten	25,218	41.02	−15.86
People's Party	Edward Beeby	4,459	7.25	+7.25
Total formal votes		61,481	98.15	+2.69
Informal votes		1,160	1.85	–2.69
Turnout		62,641	96.94	+2.47
Two-party-preferred result
Labor	John Eldridge		56.4	+13.3
Nationalist	Graham Pratten		45.6	−13.3
Labor gain from Nationalist		Swing	+13.3	

=== New England ===
1929 Australian federal election: New England
Party	Candidate	Votes	%	±%
Country	Victor Thompson	21,005	54.6	−45.4
Labor	Thomas Wilson	17,489	45.4	+45.4
Total formal votes		38,494	97.3	
Informal votes		1,063	2.7	
Turnout		39,557	93.6	
Country hold		Swing	−45.4	

=== Newcastle ===
1929 Australian federal election: Newcastle
Party	Candidate	Votes	%	±%
Labor	David Watkins	unopposed		
Labor hold		Swing		

=== North Sydney ===
1929 Australian federal election: North Sydney
Party	Candidate	Votes	%	±%
Ind. Nationalist	Billy Hughes	33,263	61.2	+61.2
Nationalist	Lewis Nott	20,298	37.3	−28.9
Independent Labor	Clifford Banks	618	1.1	+1.1
Socialist Labor	Ernie Judd	180	0.3	+0.3
Total formal votes		54,359	97.9	
Informal votes		1,169	2.1	
Turnout		55,528	95.7	
Two-party-preferred result
Ind. Nationalist	Billy Hughes		66.1	+66.1
Nationalist	Lewis Nott		33.9	−32.3
Ind. Nationalist gain from Nationalist		Swing	+32.3	

=== Parkes ===
1929 Australian federal election: Parkes
Party	Candidate	Votes	%	±%
Labor	Edward McTiernan	32,387	57.8	+15.2
Nationalist	Charles Marr	23,618	42.2	−15.2
Total formal votes		56,005	97.8	
Informal votes		1,268	2.2	
Turnout		57,273	95.5	
Labor gain from Nationalist		Swing	+15.2	

=== Parramatta ===
1929 Australian federal election: Parramatta
Party	Candidate	Votes	%	±%
Labor	Albert Rowe	30,686	53.3	+13.4
Nationalist	Eric Bowden	26,874	46.7	−13.4
Total formal votes		57,560	97.3	
Informal votes		1,582	2.7	
Turnout		59,142	95.0	
Labor gain from Nationalist		Swing	+13.4	

=== Reid ===
1929 Australian federal election: Reid
Party	Candidate	Votes	%	±%
Labor	Percy Coleman	49,909	74.6	+8.5
Nationalist	Ernest Carr	16,977	25.4	−8.5
Total formal votes		66,886	97.1	
Informal votes		1,964	2.9	
Turnout		68,850	94.7	
Labor hold		Swing	+8.5	

=== Richmond ===
1929 Australian federal election: Richmond
Party	Candidate	Votes	%	±%
Country	Roland Green	24,400	64.0	+64.0
Country	Robert Gibson	13,748	36.0	+36.0
Total formal votes		38,148	95.3	
Informal votes		1,883	4.7	
Turnout		40,031	94.2	
Country hold		Swing	+0.0	

=== Riverina ===
1929 Australian federal election: Riverina
Party	Candidate	Votes	%	±%
Country	William Killen	22,200	51.6	−3.1
Labor	William Nulty	19,606	45.6	+3.1
Country	Horace Nock	1,224	2.8	+2.8
Total formal votes		43,030	97.7	
Informal votes		1,022	2.3	
Turnout		44,052	93.9	
Two-party-preferred result
Country	William Killen		54.2	−3.3
Labor	William Nulty		45.8	+3.3
Country hold		Swing	−3.3	

=== Robertson ===
1929 Australian federal election: Robertson
Party	Candidate	Votes	%	±%
Nationalist	Sydney Gardner	19,188	51.5	−48.5
Labor	Michael Fitzgerald	18,077	48.5	+48.5
Total formal votes		37,265	96.2	
Informal votes		1,478	3.8	
Turnout		38,743	92.4	
Nationalist hold		Swing	−48.5	

=== South Sydney ===
1929 Australian federal election: South Sydney
Party	Candidate	Votes	%	±%
Labor	Edward Riley	34,978	66.3	+12.1
Nationalist	William Adkins	17,782	33.7	−12.1
Total formal votes		52,760	96.9	
Informal votes		1,696	3.1	
Turnout		54,456	92.8	
Labor hold		Swing	+12.1	

=== Warringah ===
1929 Australian federal election: Warringah
Party	Candidate	Votes	%	±%
Nationalist	Archdale Parkhill	25,129	52.6	−47.4
Ind. People's Party	Richard Windeyer	22,688	47.4	+47.4
Total formal votes		47,817	97.2	
Informal votes		1,391	2.8	
Turnout		49,208	95.7	
Nationalist hold		Swing	−47.4	

=== Wentworth ===
1929 Australian federal election: Wentworth
Party	Candidate	Votes	%	±%
Ind. Nationalist	Walter Marks	31,991	58.3	+58.3
Nationalist	Arthur Manning	22,878	41.7	−19.8
Total formal votes		54,869	96.5	
Informal votes		1,982	3.5	
Turnout		56,851	94.0	
Ind. Nationalist gain from Nationalist		Swing	+19.8	

=== Werriwa ===
1929 Australian federal election: Werriwa
Party	Candidate	Votes	%	±%
Labor	Bert Lazzarini	28,213	65.4	+3.7
Nationalist	Bernard Grogan	14,903	34.6	−3.7
Total formal votes		43,116	97.3	
Informal votes		1,204	2.7	
Turnout		44,320	94.7	
Labor hold		Swing	+3.7	

=== West Sydney ===
1929 Australian federal election: West Sydney
Party	Candidate	Votes	%	±%
Labor	Jack Beasley	28,121	86.5	+4.8
Nationalist	Lindsay Thompson	4,404	13.5	−4.8
Total formal votes		32,525	97.1	
Informal votes		973	2.9	
Turnout		33,498	94.2	
Labor hold		Swing	+4.8	

== Victoria ==
=== Balaclava ===
1929 Australian federal election: Balaclava
Party	Candidate	Votes	%	±%
Nationalist	Thomas White	31,751	58.5	−4.7
Labor	Don Cameron	22,480	41.5	+41.5
Total formal votes		54,231	95.6	
Informal votes		2,404	4.4	
Turnout		56,635	97.7	
Nationalist hold		Swing	−4.7	

=== Ballaarat ===
1929 Australian federal election: Ballaarat
Party	Candidate	Votes	%	±%
Labor	Charles McGrath	21,760	57.4	+4.8
Nationalist	Fred Edmunds	16,129	42.6	−4.8
Total formal votes		37,889	99.2	
Informal votes		337	0.8	
Turnout		38,226	97.5	
Labor hold		Swing	+4.8	

=== Batman ===
1929 Australian federal election: Batman
Party	Candidate	Votes	%	±%
Labor	Frank Brennan	46,666	75.8	+12.0
Nationalist	Cecil Keeley	14,891	24.2	−12.0
Total formal votes		61,557	98.2	
Informal votes		1,158	1.8	
Turnout		62,715	94.9	
Labor hold		Swing	+12.0	

=== Bendigo ===
1929 Australian federal election: Bendigo
Party	Candidate	Votes	%	±%
Labor	Richard Keane	21,111	55.1	+12.7
Nationalist	Geoffry Hurry	17,177	44.9	+7.3
Total formal votes		38,288	99.0	
Informal votes		390	1.0	
Turnout		38,678	96.6	
Labor gain from Nationalist		Swing	+8.2	

=== Bourke ===
1929 Australian federal election: Bourke
Party	Candidate	Votes	%	±%
Labor	Frank Anstey	43,714	77.4	+8.7
Nationalist	Lionel Hahn	12,763	22.6	−8.7
Total formal votes		56,477	98.4	
Informal votes		913	1.6	
Turnout		57,390	96.5	
Labor hold		Swing	+8.7	

=== Corangamite ===
1929 Australian federal election: Corangamite
Party	Candidate	Votes	%	±%
Labor	Richard Crouch	20,924	52.1	+5.1
Country	William Gibson	19,244	47.9	−5.1
Total formal votes		40,168	98.9	
Informal votes		461	1.1	
Turnout		40,629	95.3	
Labor gain from Country		Swing	+5.1	

=== Corio ===
1929 Australian federal election: Corio
Party	Candidate	Votes	%	±%
Labor	Arthur Lewis	27,525	56.0	+14.5
Nationalist	John Lister	21,639	44.0	−14.5
Total formal votes		49,164	98.9	
Informal votes		533	1.1	
Turnout		49,697	94.8	
Labor gain from Nationalist		Swing	+14.5	

=== Echuca ===
1929 Australian federal election: Echuca
Party	Candidate	Votes	%	±%
Country	William Hill	21,750	53.7	−6.3
Labor	Edward Hill	18,734	46.3	+46.3
Total formal votes		40,484	98.3	
Informal votes		712	1.7	
Turnout		41,196	96.1	
Country hold		Swing	−6.3	

=== Fawkner ===
1929 Australian federal election: Fawkner
Party	Candidate	Votes	%	±%
Ind. Nationalist	George Maxwell	25,564	59.4	+59.4
Nationalist	Arthur Robinson	16,547	38.4	−23.3
Independent	James Ronald	950	2.2	+2.2
Total formal votes		43,061	98.7	
Informal votes		584	1.3	
Turnout		43,645	93.5	
Two-party-preferred result
Ind. Nationalist	George Maxwell		61.4	+61.4
Nationalist	Arthur Robinson		38.6	−23.1
Ind. Nationalist gain from Nationalist		Swing	+23.1	

=== Flinders ===
1929 Australian federal election: Flinders
Party	Candidate	Votes	%	±%
Labor	Jack Holloway	30,114	48.2	+10.0
Nationalist	Stanley Bruce	30,054	48.1	−11.3
Independent Liberal	Joseph Burch	2,267	3.6	+3.6
Total formal votes		62,435	98.6	
Informal votes		903	1.4	
Turnout		63,338	96.2	
Two-party-preferred result
Labor	Jack Holloway	31,370	50.2	+10.9
Nationalist	Stanley Bruce	31,065	49.8	−10.9
Labor gain from Nationalist		Swing	+10.9	

=== Gippsland ===
1929 Australian federal election: Gippsland
Party	Candidate	Votes	%	±%
Country	Thomas Paterson	25,056	58.2	+0.5
Labor	Michael Buckley	18,030	41.8	+41.8
Total formal votes		43,086	98.0	
Informal votes		889	2.0	
Turnout		43,975	96.4	
Country hold		Swing	+0.5	

=== Henty ===
1929 Australian federal election: Henty
Party	Candidate	Votes	%	±%
Nationalist	Henry Gullett	35,557	48.6	−18.0
Labor	Billy Duggan	33,195	45.4	+12.0
Ind. Nationalist	William Bolton	4,355	6.0	+6.0
Total formal votes		73,107	98.8	
Informal votes		870	1.2	
Turnout		73,977	95.2	
Two-party-preferred result
Nationalist	Henry Gullett	37,433	51.2	−15.4
Labor	Billy Duggan	35,674	48.8	+15.4
Nationalist hold		Swing	−15.4	

=== Indi ===
1929 Australian federal election: Indi
Party	Candidate	Votes	%	±%
Labor	Paul Jones	19,319	49.4	−50.6
Country	Robert Cook	11,493	29.4	+29.4
Country	Arthur Walter	6,124	15.7	+15.7
Country	Leslie Sambell	2,180	5.6	+5.6
Total formal votes		39,116	98.2	
Informal votes		721	1.8	
Turnout		39,837	96.0	
Two-party-preferred result
Labor	Paul Jones	20,110	51.4	−48.6
Country	Robert Cook	19,006	48.6	+48.6
Labor hold		Swing	−48.6	

=== Kooyong ===
1929 Australian federal election: Kooyong
Party	Candidate	Votes	%	±%
Nationalist	John Latham	34,909	55.2	−11.3
Labor	Albert Langker	28,276	44.8	+11.3
Total formal votes		63,185	98.6	
Informal votes		898	1.4	
Turnout		64,083	95.4	
Nationalist hold		Swing	−11.3	

=== Maribyrnong ===
1929 Australian federal election: Maribyrnong
Party	Candidate	Votes	%	±%
Labor	James Fenton	39,409	73.2	+13.3
Nationalist	Percy Anderson	14,441	26.8	−13.3
Total formal votes		53,850	98.6	
Informal votes		740	1.4	
Turnout		54,590	97.7	
Labor hold		Swing	+13.3	

=== Melbourne ===
1929 Australian federal election: Melbourne
Party	Candidate	Votes	%	±%
Labor	William Maloney	unopposed		
Labor hold		Swing		

=== Melbourne Ports ===
1929 Australian federal election: Melbourne Ports
Party	Candidate	Votes	%	±%
Labor	James Mathews	unopposed		
Labor hold		Swing		

=== Wannon ===
1929 Australian federal election: Wannon
Party	Candidate	Votes	%	±%
Labor	John McNeill	21,338	52.0	+4.8
Nationalist	Arthur Rodgers	19,720	48.0	−4.8
Total formal votes		41,058	98.7	
Informal votes		541	1.3	
Turnout		41,599	97.0	
Labor gain from Nationalist		Swing	+4.8	

=== Wimmera ===
1929 Australian federal election: Wimmera
Party	Candidate	Votes	%	±%
Country Progressive	Percy Stewart	27,942	60.0	+1.6
Country	John Harris	16,551	40.0	−1.6
Total formal votes		46,551	98.6	
Informal votes		650	1.4	
Turnout		47,201	94.9	
Country Progressive hold		Swing	+1.6	

=== Yarra ===
1929 Australian federal election: Yarra
Party	Candidate	Votes	%	±%
Labor	James Scullin	unopposed		
Labor hold		Swing		

== Queensland ==
=== Brisbane ===
1929 Australian federal election: Brisbane
Party	Candidate	Votes	%	±%
Nationalist	Donald Cameron	21,048	52.4	−4.3
Labor	Myles Ferricks	19,103	47.6	+4.3
Total formal votes		40,151	97.1	
Informal votes		1,202	2.9	
Turnout		41,353	94.6	
Nationalist hold		Swing	−4.3	

=== Capricornia ===
1929 Australian federal election: Capricornia
Party	Candidate	Votes	%	±%
Labor	Frank Forde	24,362	53.4	+0.9
Nationalist	Robert Staines	21,277	46.6	+46.6
Total formal votes		45,639	95.6	
Informal votes		2,116	4.4	
Turnout		47,755	94.1	
Labor hold		Swing	+0.9	

=== Darling Downs ===
1929 Australian federal election: Darling Downs
Party	Candidate	Votes	%	±%
Nationalist	Arthur Morgan	19,238	46.6	−53.4
Labor	Evan Llewelyn	12,738	30.9	+30.9
Ind. Nationalist	Sir Littleton Groom	9,290	22.5	+22.5
Total formal votes		41,266	97.9	
Informal votes		864	2.1	
Turnout		42,130	97.2	
Two-party-preferred result
Nationalist	Arthur Morgan	23,873	57.9	−42.1
Labor	Evan Llewelyn	17,393	42.1	+42.1
Nationalist hold		Swing	−42.1	

=== Herbert ===
1929 Australian federal election: Herbert
Party	Candidate	Votes	%	±%
Labor	George Martens	28,813	52.8	+2.6
Nationalist	William Amiet	25,772	47.2	−2.6
Total formal votes		54,585	95.5	
Informal votes		2,593	4.5	
Turnout		57,178	93.2	
Labor hold		Swing	+2.6	

=== Kennedy ===
1929 Australian federal election: Kennedy
Party	Candidate	Votes	%	±%
Labor	Darby Riordan	15,392	53.1	+5.5
Nationalist	Grosvenor Francis	13,593	46.9	−5.5
Total formal votes		28,985	95.3	
Informal votes		1,436	4.7	
Turnout		30,421	89.9	
Labor gain from Nationalist		Swing	+5.5	

=== Lilley ===
1929 Australian federal election: Lilley
Party	Candidate	Votes	%	±%
Nationalist	George Mackay	34,726	67.1	−32.9
Independent	Frederick O'Keefe	17,010	32.9	+32.9
Total formal votes		51,736	93.2	
Informal votes		3,776	6.8	
Turnout		55,512	96.0	
Nationalist hold		Swing	−32.9	

=== Maranoa ===
1929 Australian federal election: Maranoa
Party	Candidate	Votes	%	±%
Country	James Hunter	17,215	54.9	−3.4
Labor	Robert Munro	14,123	45.1	+3.4
Total formal votes		31,338	97.2	
Informal votes		891	2.8	
Turnout		32,229	92.4	
Country hold		Swing	−3.4	

=== Moreton ===
1929 Australian federal election: Moreton
Party	Candidate	Votes	%	±%
Nationalist	Josiah Francis	27,716	60.1	−39.9
Labor	Robert Taylor	18,371	39.9	+39.9
Total formal votes		46,087	96.4	
Informal votes		1,733	3.6	
Turnout		47,820	96.2	
Nationalist hold		Swing	−39.9	

=== Oxley ===
1929 Australian federal election: Oxley
Party	Candidate	Votes	%	±%
Nationalist	James Bayley	26,308	50.1	−3.6
Labor	Francis Baker	26,208	49.9	+3.6
Total formal votes		52,516	97.1	
Informal votes		1,575	2.9	
Turnout		54,091	95.5	
Nationalist hold		Swing	−3.6	

=== Wide Bay ===
1929 Australian federal election: Wide Bay
Party	Candidate	Votes	%	±%
Country	Bernard Corser	29,249	67.2	−32.8
Labor	John O'Keefe	14,307	32.8	+32.8
Total formal votes		43,556	95.6	
Informal votes		2,023	4.4	
Turnout		45,59	95.1	
Country hold		Swing	−32.8	

== South Australia ==
=== Adelaide ===
1929 Australian federal election: Adelaide
Party	Candidate	Votes	%	±%
Labor	George Edwin Yates	24,174	61.4	+5.5
Nationalist	Arthur Wreford	15,171	38.6	−5.5
Total formal votes		39,345	95.6	
Informal votes		1,791	4.4	
Turnout		41,136	94.5	
Labor hold		Swing	+5.5	

=== Angas ===
1929 Australian federal election: Angas
Party	Candidate	Votes	%	±%
Labor	Moses Gabb	25,679	54.7	+14.1
Nationalist	Walter Parsons	21,239	45.3	−14.1
Total formal votes		46,918	96.3	
Informal votes		1,824	3.7	
Turnout		48,742	96.3	
Labor gain from Nationalist		Swing	+14.1	

=== Barker ===
1929 Australian federal election: Barker
Party	Candidate	Votes	%	±%
Nationalist	Malcolm Cameron	23,189	51.2	−1.4
Labor	Frank Nieass	22,067	48.8	+48.8
Total formal votes		45,256	94.9	
Informal votes		2,459	5.1	
Turnout		47,715	95.6	
Nationalist hold		Swing	−1.4	

=== Boothby ===
1929 Australian federal election: Boothby
Party	Candidate	Votes	%	±%
Labor	John Price	24,841	55.6	+5.5
Nationalist	Bill McCann	19,847	44.4	−5.5
Total formal votes		44,688	96.7	
Informal votes		1,548	3.3	
Turnout		46,236	93.8	
Labor hold		Swing	+5.5	

=== Grey ===
1929 Australian federal election: Grey
Party	Candidate	Votes	%	±%
Labor	Andrew Lacey	19,870	59.6	+3.8
Country	Oliver Badman	13,445	40.4	+40.4
Total formal votes		33,315	95.7	
Informal votes		1,485	4.3	
Turnout		34,800	92.7	
Labor hold		Swing	+3.8	

=== Hindmarsh ===
1929 Australian federal election: Hindmarsh
Party	Candidate	Votes	%	±%
Labor	Norman Makin	unopposed		
Labor hold		Swing		

=== Wakefield ===
1929 Australian federal election: Wakefield
Party	Candidate	Votes	%	±%
Labor	Sydney McHugh	12,503	36.4	+36.4
Nationalist	Charles Hawker	12,417	36.1	−4.3
Country	Maurice Collins	9,437	27.5	−32.1
Total formal votes		34,357	96.5	
Informal votes		1,251	3.5	
Turnout		35,608	96.0	
Two-party-preferred result
Nationalist	Charles Hawker	19,547	56.9	+16.5
Labor	Sydney McHugh	14,810	43.1	+43.1
Nationalist gain from Country		Swing	+16.5	

== Western Australia ==
=== Forrest ===
1929 Australian federal election: Forrest
Party	Candidate	Votes	%	±%
Country	John Prowse	unopposed		
Country hold		Swing		

=== Fremantle ===
1929 Australian federal election: Fremantle
Party	Candidate	Votes	%	±%
Labor	John Curtin	24,482	57.0	+7.8
Nationalist	Keith Watson	18,426	43.0	+14.2
Total formal votes		42,980	97.9	
Informal votes		914	2.1	
Turnout		43,822	91.0	
Labor hold		Swing	+4.9	

=== Kalgoorlie ===
1929 Australian federal election: Kalgoorlie
Party	Candidate	Votes	%	±%
Labor	Albert Green	15,761	63.9	−36.1
Country	William Pickering	5,684	23.1	+23.1
Nationalist	William Greenard	3,203	13.0	+13.0
Total formal votes		24,648	98.0	
Informal votes		505	2.0	
Turnout		25,153	84.6	
Two-party-preferred result
Labor	Albert Green		65.2	−34.8
Country	William Pickering		34.8	+34.8
Labor hold		Swing	−34.8	

=== Perth ===
1929 Australian federal election: Perth
Party	Candidate	Votes	%	±%
Labor	Ted Needham	16,411	43.1	+9.1
Nationalist	Walter Nairn	13,521	35.5	−26.3
Ind. Nationalist	Edward Mann	7,645	20.1	+20.1
Independent	John McCoo	522	1.4	−2.8
Total formal votes		38,099	97.4	
Informal votes		1,020	2.6	
Turnout		39,119	89.9	
Two-party-preferred result
Nationalist	Walter Nairn	19,254	50.5	−14.4
Labor	Ted Needham	18,845	49.5	+14.4
Nationalist hold		Swing	−14.4	

=== Swan ===
1929 Australian federal election: Swan
Party	Candidate	Votes	%	±%
Country	Henry Gregory	unopposed		
Country hold		Swing		

== Tasmania ==
=== Bass ===
1929 Australian federal election: Bass
Party	Candidate	Votes	%	±%
Labor	Allan Guy	13,318	60.4	+17.8
Nationalist	Syd Jackson	8,741	39.6	−17.8
Total formal votes		22,059	98.6	
Informal votes		324	1.4	
Turnout		22,383	95.4	
Labor gain from Nationalist		Swing	+13.5	

=== Darwin ===
1929 Australian federal election: Darwin
Party	Candidate	Votes	%	±%
Nationalist	George Bell	11,982	53.6	−18.3
Labor	Henry Lane	5,233	23.4	+23.4
Labor	Thomas d'Alton	5,137	23.0	+23.0
Total formal votes		22,352	98.1	
Informal votes		443	1.9	
Turnout		22,795	95.1	
Two-party-preferred result
Nationalist	George Bell		55.9	−16.0
Labor	Henry Lane		44.1	+44.1
Nationalist hold		Swing	−16.0	

=== Denison ===
1929 Australian federal election: Denison
Party	Candidate	Votes	%	±%
Labor	Charles Culley	12,451	57.5	+5.1
Nationalist	Sir John Gellibrand	5,663	26.2	−5.9
Nationalist	Horace Walch	2,082	9.6	+9.6
Nationalist	Hubert Brettingham-Moore	681	3.1	+3.1
Nationalist	John Gage	605	2.8	+2.8
Independent	David Blanchard	161	0.7	+0.7
Total formal votes		21,643	97.2	
Informal votes		623	2.8	
Turnout		22,266	95.9	
Two-party-preferred result
Labor	Charles Culley		59.2	+8.9
Nationalist	Sir John Gellibrand		40.8	−8.9
Labor hold		Swing	+8.9	

=== Franklin ===
1929 Australian federal election: Franklin
Party	Candidate	Votes	%	±%
Independent	William McWilliams	12,399	54.9	+10.4
Nationalist	Alfred Seabrook	10,175	45.1	−10.4
Total formal votes		22,574	98.5	
Informal votes		343	1.5	
Turnout		22,917	95.3	
Independent hold		Swing	+3.3	

=== Wilmot ===
1929 Australian federal election: Wilmot
Party	Candidate	Votes	%	±%
Labor	Joseph Lyons	10,697	52.9	+52.9
Nationalist	Llewellyn Atkinson	9,538	47.1	−16.5
Total formal votes		20,235	97.1	
Informal votes		331	1.6	
Turnout		20,566	94.5	
Labor gain from Nationalist		Swing	+16.5	

== Northern Territory ==
=== Northern Territory ===
1929 Australian federal election: Northern Territory
Party	Candidate	Votes	%	±%
Labor	Harold Nelson	unopposed		
Labor hold		Swing		

== See also ==
- Candidates of the 1929 Australian federal election
- Members of the Australian House of Representatives, 1929–1931
