= Electoral results for the Division of Martin =

Australian division election results

This is a list of electoral results for the Division of Martin in Australian federal elections from the division's creation in 1922 until its abolition in 1955.

== Members ==
Member	Party	Term
Herbert Pratten	Nationalist	1922–1928
Graham Pratten	Nationalist	1928–1929
John Eldridge	Labor	1929–1931
John Eldridge	Labor (NSW)	1931–1931
William Holman	United Australia	1931–1934
William McCall	United Australia	1934–1943
Fred Daly	Labor	1943–1949
William O'Connor	Labor	1949–1955

== Election results ==
=== Elections in the 1950s ===
==== 1954 ====
1954 Australian federal election: Martin
Party	Candidate	Votes	%	±%
Labor	William O'Connor	21,430	59.1	+5.2
Liberal	Elton Lewis	13,708	37.8	+0.4
Communist	Ernie Thornton	1,134	3.1	−3.2
Total formal votes		36,272	98.7	
Informal votes		466	1.3	
Turnout		36,738	97.1	
Two-party-preferred result
Labor	William O'Connor		61.9	+1.1
Liberal	Elton Lewis		38.1	−1.1
Labor hold		Swing	+1.1	

==== 1951 ====
1951 Australian federal election: Martin
Party	Candidate	Votes	%	±%
Labor	William O'Connor	20,362	53.9	+0.4
Liberal	George Read	14,132	37.4	−0.4
Communist	Terry Gordon	2,379	6.3	+1.5
Independent	Malinda Ivey	908	2.4	+2.4
Total formal votes		37,781	97.5	
Informal votes		974	2.5	
Turnout		38,755	96.6	
Two-party-preferred result
Labor	William O'Connor		60.8	+1.2
Liberal	George Read		39.2	−1.2
Labor hold		Swing	+1.2	

=== Elections in the 1940s ===
==== 1949 ====
1949 Australian federal election: Martin
Party	Candidate	Votes	%	±%
Labor	William O'Connor	20,603	53.5	−1.9
Liberal	Frederick Mann	14,550	37.8	+8.2
Communist	Tom Dowling	1,847	4.8	+0.6
Lang Labor	Frank Moss	808	2.1	−3.8
Independent	Malinda Ivey	681	1.8	+1.8
Total formal votes		38,489	97.3	
Informal votes		1,057	2.7	
Turnout		39,546	97.3	
Two-party-preferred result
Labor	William O'Connor		59.6	−6.1
Liberal	Frederick Mann		40.4	+6.1
Labor hold		Swing	−6.1	

==== 1946 ====
1946 Australian federal election: Martin
Party	Candidate	Votes	%	±%
Labor	Fred Daly	35,998	55.0	+8.1
Liberal	Frederick Jacobs	29,507	45.0	+11.7
Total formal votes		65,505	98.1	
Informal votes		1,258	1.9	
Turnout		66,763	96.2	
Labor hold		Swing	−0.7	

==== 1943 ====
1943 Australian federal election: Martin
Party	Candidate	Votes	%	±%
Labor	Fred Daly	27,999	46.9	+11.9
United Australia	William McCall	19,886	33.3	−16.8
State Labor	Albert Sloss	3,597	6.0	−8.9
Liberal Democratic	George Mills	3,591	6.0	+6.0
Independent	John Lee	1,690	2.8	+2.8
Independent	Eleanor Glencross	833	1.4	+1.4
Independent	Gerrard Armstrong	787	1.3	+1.3
Independent	Edward Beck	564	0.9	+0.9
Ind. Nationalist	William Milne	507	0.8	+0.8
Independent	Isabella Stenning	170	0.3	+0.3
Ind. United Australia	Rupert Nicholson	86	0.1	+0.1
Total formal votes		59,710	93.4	
Informal votes		4,228	6.6	
Turnout		63,938	97.6	
Two-party-preferred result
Labor	Fred Daly		55.7	+8.3
United Australia	William McCall		44.3	−8.3
Labor gain from United Australia		Swing	+8.3	

==== 1940 ====
1940 Australian federal election: Martin
Party	Candidate	Votes	%	±%
United Australia	William McCall	28,727	50.1	−6.0
Labor	Raymond Watt	20,036	35.0	−1.6
State Labor	Rupert Lockwood	8,555	14.9	+14.9
Total formal votes		57,318	98.5	
Informal votes		853	1.5	
Turnout		58,171	96.6	
Two-party-preferred result
United Australia	William McCall		52.6	−7.7
Labor	Raymond Watt		47.4	+7.7
United Australia hold		Swing	−7.7	

=== Elections in the 1930s ===
==== 1937 ====
1937 Australian federal election: Martin
Party	Candidate	Votes	%	±%
United Australia	William McCall	30,971	56.1	+2.5
Labor	Stan Taylor	20,186	36.6	+29.4
Social Credit	George Carruthers	4,009	7.3	−3.0
Total formal votes		55,166	97.7	
Informal votes		1,304	2.3	
Turnout		56,470	97.6	
Two-party-preferred result
United Australia	William McCall		60.3	−0.2
Labor	Stan Taylor		39.7	+0.2
United Australia hold		Swing	−0.2	

==== 1934 ====
1934 Australian federal election: Martin
Party	Candidate	Votes	%	±%
United Australia	William McCall	28,079	53.6	−9.4
Labor (NSW)	Charles Hankin	15,183	29.0	+4.7
Social Credit	William Stones	5,395	10.3	+10.3
Labor	John McCallum	1,932	3.7	−4.0
Labor	Henry McDicken	1,813	3.5	+3.5
Total formal votes		52,402	96.3	
Informal votes		2,031	3.7	
Turnout		54,433	97.4	
Two-party-preferred result
United Australia	William McCall		60.5	−4.5
Labor (NSW)	Charles Hankin		39.5	+4.5
United Australia hold		Swing	−4.5	

==== 1931 ====
1931 Australian federal election: Martin
Party	Candidate	Votes	%	±%
United Australia	William Holman	26,075	41.2	+25.1
United Australia	Mac Abbott	15,741	24.9	+24.9
Labor (NSW)	Charles Hankin	14,300	22.6	+22.6
Labor	James Catts	7,098	11.2	−40.5
Total formal votes		63,214	96.2	
Informal votes		2,469	3.8	
Turnout		65,683	96.2	
Two-party-preferred result
United Australia	William Holman	41,886	66.3	+22.7
Labor (NSW)	Charles Hankin	21,328	33.7	+33.7
United Australia gain from Labor		Swing	+22.7	

=== Elections in the 1920s ===
==== 1929 ====
1929 Australian federal election: Martin
Party	Candidate	Votes	%	±%
Labor	John Eldridge	31,804	51.73	+8.61
Nationalist	Graham Pratten	25,218	41.02	−15.86
People's Party	Edward Beeby	4,459	7.25	+7.25
Total formal votes		61,481	98.15	+2.69
Informal votes		1,160	1.85	–2.69
Turnout		62,641	96.94	+2.47
Two-party-preferred result
Labor	John Eldridge		56.4	+13.3
Nationalist	Graham Pratten		45.6	−13.3
Labor gain from Nationalist		Swing	+13.3	

==== 1928 ====
1928 Australian federal election: Martin
Party	Candidate	Votes	%	±%
Nationalist	Graham Pratten	31,166	56.88	−7.88
Labor	Percy Hannett	23,631	43.12	+7.88
Total formal votes		54,797	95.46	–2.57
Informal votes		2,609	4.54	+2.57
Turnout		57,406	94.47	+0.63
Nationalist hold		Swing	−7.88	

1928 Martin by-election
Party	Candidate	Votes	%	±%
Nationalist	Graham Pratten	29,482	60.91	−3.85
Labor	Percy Hannett	18,922	39.09	+3.85
Total formal votes		48,404	93.01	–5.02
Informal votes		3,635	6.99	+5.02
Turnout		52,039	87.41	−6.43
Nationalist hold		Swing	−3.85	

==== 1925 ====
1925 Australian federal election: Martin
Party	Candidate	Votes	%	±%
Nationalist	Herbert Pratten	31,730	64.76	+64.76
Labor	Henry McDicken	17,263	35.24	+35.24
Total formal votes		48,993	98.03	
Informal votes		986	1.97	
Turnout		49,979	93.84	
Nationalist hold		Swing	−35.24	

==== 1922 ====
1922 Australian federal election: Martin
Party	Candidate	Votes	%	±%
Nationalist	Herbert Pratten	unopposed		
Nationalist notional hold		Swing		
