= Candidates of the 1929 Australian federal election =

This article provides information on candidates who stood for the 1929 Australian federal election. The election was held on 12 October 1929. There was no election for the Senate.

== By-elections, appointments and defections ==
=== By-elections and appointments ===
- On 3 August 1929, Thomas White (Nationalist) was elected to succeed William Watt (Nationalist) as the member for Balaclava.

=== Defections ===
- In 1929, Nationalist MPs Billy Hughes (North Sydney), Edward Mann (Perth), Walter Marks (Wentworth) and George Maxwell (Fawkner) crossed the floor to bring down the Bruce government. All were expelled from the Nationalist Party. The Speaker of the House of Representatives, Nationalist MP Sir Littleton Groom (Darling Downs), refused to use his casting vote to save the Government and was also expelled. All five contested the election as independents.

== Retiring Members ==
No members retired in 1929.

== House of Representatives ==
Sitting members at the time of the election are shown in bold text. Successful candidates are highlighted in the relevant colour. Where there is possible confusion, an asterisk (*) is also used.

=== New South Wales ===
Electorate	Held by	Labor candidate	Coalition candidate	Other candidates
Barton	Labor	**James Tully**	William Myhill (Nat)	
Calare	Nationalist	George Gibbons	**Sir Neville Howse** (Nat)	
Cook	Labor	**Edward Riley**	William Pickup (Nat)	
Cowper	Country		**Earle Page** (CP)	
Dalley	Labor	**Ted Theodore**	Thomas Morrow (Nat)	
Darling	Labor	**Arthur Blakeley**	Brian Doe (Nat)	
East Sydney	Labor	**John West**	Hyman Diamond (Nat)	
Eden-Monaro	Nationalist	John Cusack	**John Perkins** (Nat)	
Gwydir	Country	Lou Cunningham	**Aubrey Abbott** (CP)	
Hume	Labor	**Parker Moloney**	Thomas Fitzpatrick (CP)	
Hunter	Labor	**Rowley James**		
Lang	Labor	**William Long**	Dick Dein (Nat)	
Macquarie	Labor	**Ben Chifley**	Charles Dash (Nat)	
Martin	Nationalist	John Eldridge	**Graham Pratten** (Nat)	Edward Beeby (APP)
New England	Country	Thomas Wilson	**Victor Thompson** (CP)	
Newcastle	Labor	**David Watkins**		
North Sydney	Nationalist		Lewis Nott (Nat)	Clifford Banks (Ind Lab); **Billy Hughes*** (Ind Nat); Ernie Judd (Soc Lab)
Parkes	Nationalist	Edward McTiernan	**Charles Marr** (Nat)	
Parramatta	Nationalist	Albert Rowe	**Eric Bowden** (Nat)	
Reid	Labor	**Percy Coleman**	Ernest Carr (Nat)	
Richmond	Country		Robert Gibson (CP); **Roland Green*** (CP)	
Riverina	Country	William Nulty	**William Killen*** (CP); Horace Nock (CP)	
Robertson	Nationalist	Michael Fitzgerald	**Sydney Gardner** (Nat)	
South Sydney	Labor	**Edward Riley**	William Adkins (Nat)	
Warringah	Nationalist		**Archdale Parkhill** (Nat)	Richard Windeyer (Ind PP)
Wentworth	Nationalist		Arthur Manning (Nat)	**Walter Marks*** (Ind Nat)
Werriwa	Labor	**Bert Lazzarini**	Bernard Grogan (Nat)	
West Sydney	Labor	**Jack Beasley**	Lindsay Thompson (Nat)	

=== Northern Territory ===
Electorate	Held by	Labor candidate
Northern Territory	Labor	**Harold Nelson**

=== Queensland ===
Electorate	Held by	Labor candidate	Coalition candidate	Other candidates
Brisbane	Nationalist	Myles Ferricks	**Donald Cameron** (Nat)	
Capricornia	Labor	**Frank Forde**	Robert Staines (Nat)	
Darling Downs	Nationalist	Evan Llewelyn	Arthur Morgan (Nat)	**Sir Littleton Groom** (Ind Nat)
Herbert	Labor	**George Martens**	William Amiet (Nat)	
Kennedy	Nationalist	Darby Riordan	**Grosvenor Francis** (Nat)	
Lilley	Nationalist		**George Mackay** (Nat)	Frederick O'Keefe (Ind)
Maranoa	Country	Robert Munro	**James Hunter** (CP)	
Moreton	Nationalist	Robert Taylor	**Josiah Francis** (Nat)	
Oxley	Nationalist	Francis Baker	**James Bayley** (Nat)	
Wide Bay	Country	John O'Keefe	**Bernard Corser** (CP)	

=== South Australia ===
Electorate	Held by	Labor candidate	Coalition candidate
Adelaide	Labor	**George Edwin Yates**	Arthur Wreford (Nat)
Angas	Nationalist	Moses Gabb	**Walter Parsons** (Nat)
Barker	Nationalist	Frank Nieass	**Malcolm Cameron** (Nat)
Boothby	Labor	**John Price**	Bill McCann (Nat)
Grey	Labor	**Andrew Lacey**	Oliver Badman (CP)
Hindmarsh	Labor	**Norman Makin**	
Wakefield	Country	Sydney McHugh	**Maurice Collins** (CP); Charles Hawker* (Nat)

=== Tasmania ===
Electorate	Held by	Labor candidate	Nationalist candidate	Independent candidate(s)
Bass	Nationalist	Allan Guy	**Syd Jackson**	
Darwin	Nationalist	Thomas d'Alton; Henry Lane	**George Bell**	
Denison	Labor	**Charles Culley**	Hubert Brettingham-Moore; John Gage; Sir John Gellibrand; Horace Walch	David Blanchard
Franklin	Independent		Alfred Seabrook	**William McWilliams**
Wilmot	Nationalist	Joseph Lyons	**Llewellyn Atkinson**	

=== Victoria ===
Electorate	Held by	Labor candidate	Coalition candidate	Other candidates
Balaclava	Nationalist	Don Cameron	**Thomas White** (Nat)	
Ballaarat	Labor	**Charles McGrath**	Fred Edmunds (Nat)	
Batman	Labor	**Frank Brennan**	Cecil Keeley (Nat)	
Bendigo	Nationalist	Richard Keane	**Geoffry Hurry** (Nat)	
Bourke	Labor	**Frank Anstey**	Lionel Hahn (Nat)	
Corangamite	Country	Richard Crouch	**William Gibson** (CP)	
Corio	Nationalist	Arthur Lewis	**John Lister** (Nat)	
Echuca	Country	Edward Hill	**William Hill** (CP)	
Fawkner	Nationalist		Sir Arthur Robinson (Nat)	**George Maxwell*** (Ind Nat); James Ronald (Ind)
Flinders	Nationalist	Jack Holloway	**Stanley Bruce** (Nat)	Joseph Burch (Ind Lib)
Gippsland	Country	Michael Buckley	**Thomas Paterson** (CP)	
Henty	Nationalist	Billy Duggan	**Henry Gullett** (Nat)	William Bolton (Ind Nat)
Indi	Labor	**Paul Jones**	Robert Cook (CP); Leslie Sambell (CP); Arthur Walter (CP)	
Kooyong	Nationalist	Albert Langker	**John Latham** (Nat)	
Maribyrnong	Labor	**James Fenton**	Percy Anderson (Nat)	
Melbourne	Labor	**William Maloney**		
Melbourne Ports	Labor	**James Mathews**		
Wannon	Nationalist	John McNeill	**Arthur Rodgers** (Nat)	
Wimmera	CPP		John Harris (CP)	**Percy Stewart** (CPP)
Yarra	Labor	**James Scullin**		

=== Western Australia ===
Electorate	Held by	Labor candidate	Coalition candidate	Independent candidate(s)
Forrest	Country		**John Prowse** (CP)	
Fremantle	Labor	**John Curtin**	Keith Watson (Nat)	
Kalgoorlie	Labor	**Albert Green**	William Greenard (Nat); William Pickering (CP)	
Perth	Nationalist	Ted Needham	Walter Nairn (Nat)	John McCoo (Ind); **Edward Mann** (Ind Nat)
Swan	Country		**Henry Gregory** (CP)	

== See also ==
- Members of the Australian House of Representatives, 1928–1929
- Members of the Australian House of Representatives, 1929–1931
- List of political parties in Australia
