= Members of the Australian House of Representatives, 1929–1931 =

This is a list of the members of the Australian House of Representatives in the 12th Australian Parliament, which was elected at the 1929 election on 12 October 1929. The incumbent Nationalist Party of Australia led by Prime Minister of Australia Stanley Bruce in power since 1923 with coalition partner the Country Party led by Earle Page was defeated by the opposition Australian Labor Party led by James Scullin. Labor won with its then largest-ever majority in the federal parliament. However major divisions within the Labor over policy responses to the Great Depression, and the subsequent creation of the United Australia Party led to thirty parliamentarians changing their party affiliation in 1931.

Member	Party after 1929 election	Party at 1931 election	Electorate	State	Term in office
Frank Anstey	Labor	Labor	Bourke	Vic	1910–1934
James Bayley	Nationalist	United Australia	Oxley	Qld	1917–1931
Jack Beasley	Labor	Lang Labor	West Sydney	NSW	1928–1946
George Bell	Nationalist	United Australia	Darwin	Tas	1919–1922, 1925–1943
Arthur Blakeley	Labor	Labor	Darling	NSW	1917–1934
Frank Brennan	Labor	Labor	Batman	Vic	1911–1931, 1934–1949
Donald Charles Cameron	Nationalist	United Australia	Brisbane	Qld	1919–1931, 1934–1937
Malcolm Cameron	Nationalist	United Australia	Barker	SA	1922–1934
Ben Chifley	Labor	Labor	Macquarie	NSW	1928–1931, 1940–1951
Percy Coleman	Labor	Labor	Reid	NSW	1922–1931
Bernard Corser	Country	Country	Wide Bay	Qld	1928–1954
Richard Crouch	Labor	Labor	Corangamite	Vic	1901–1910, 1929–1931
Charles Culley	Labor	Labor	Denison	Tas	1928–1931
Lou Cunningham	Labor	Labor	Gwydir	NSW	1919–1925, 1929–1931
John Curtin	Labor	Labor	Fremantle	WA	1928–1931, 1934–1945
John Cusack	Labor	Labor	Eden-Monaro	NSW	1929–1931
John Eldridge	Labor	Lang Labor	Martin	NSW	1929–1931
James Fenton	Labor	United Australia	Maribyrnong	Vic	1910–1934
Frank Forde	Labor	Labor	Capricornia	Qld	1922–1946
Josiah Francis	Nationalist	United Australia	Moreton	Qld	1922–1955
Charles Frost		Labor	Franklin	Tas	1929–1931, 1934–1946
Moses Gabb	Labor	Independent	Angas	SA	1919–1925, 1929–1934
Sydney Gardner	Nationalist	United Australia	Robertson	NSW	1922–1940
George Gibbons	Labor	Labor	Calare	NSW	1929–1931
Albert Green	Labor	Labor	Kalgoorlie	WA	1922–1940
Roland Green	Country	Country	Richmond	NSW	1922–1937
Henry Gregory	Country	Country	Swan	WA	1913–1940
Henry Gullett	Nationalist	United Australia	Henty	Vic	1925–1940
Allan Guy	Labor	United Australia	Bass	Tas	1929–1934, 1940–1946
Charles Hawker	Nationalist	United Australia	Wakefield	SA	1929–1938
William Hill	Country	Country	Echuca	Vic	1919–1934
Jack Holloway	Labor	Labor	Flinders	Vic	1929–1951
Billy Hughes	Independent/Australian	United Australia	North Sydney	NSW	1901–1952
James Hunter	Country	Country	Maranoa	Qld	1921–1940
Rowley James	Labor	Lang Labor	Hunter	NSW	1928–1958
Paul Jones	Labor	Labor	Indi	Vic	1928–1931
Richard Keane	Labor	Labor	Bendigo	Vic	1929–1931, 1938–1946 (S)
William Killen	Country	Country	Riverina	NSW	1922–1931
Andrew Lacey	Labor	Labor	Grey	SA	1922–1931
John Latham	Nationalist	United Australia	Kooyong	Vic	1922–1934
Bert Lazzarini	Labor	Lang Labor	Werriwa	NSW	1919–1931, 1934–1952
Arthur Lewis	Labor	Labor	Corio	Vic	1929–1931
William Long	Labor	Labor	Lang	NSW	1928–1931
Joseph Lyons	Labor	United Australia	Wilmot	Tas	1929–1939
George Mackay	Nationalist	United Australia	Lilley	Qld	1917–1934
Norman Makin	Labor	Labor	Hindmarsh	SA	1919–1946, 1954–1963
William Maloney	Labor	Labor	Melbourne	Vic	1904–1940
Walter Marks	Independent/Australian	United Australia	Wentworth	NSW	1919–1931
Charles Marr	Nationalist	United Australia	Parkes	NSW	1919–1929, 1931–1943
George Martens	Labor	Labor	Herbert	Qld	1928–1946
James Mathews	Labor	Labor	Melbourne Ports	Vic	1906–1931
George Maxwell	Independent/Australian	United Australia	Fawkner	Vic	1917–1935
Charles McGrath	Labor	United Australia	Ballaarat	Vic	1913–1919, 1920–1934
John McNeill	Labor	Labor	Wannon	Vic	1922–1925, 1929–1931
Edward McTiernan	Labor		Parkes	NSW	1929–1930
William McWilliams	Independent		Franklin	Tas	1903–1922, 1928–1929
Parker Moloney	Labor	Labor	Hume	NSW	1910–1913, 1914–1917, 1919–1931
Arthur Morgan	Nationalist	United Australia	Darling Downs	Qld	1929–1931
Walter Nairn	Nationalist	United Australia	Perth	WA	1929–1943
Harold George Nelson	Labor	Labor	Northern Territory	NT	1922–1934
Sir Earle Page	Country	Country	Cowper	NSW	1919–1961
Archdale Parkhill	Nationalist	United Australia	Warringah	NSW	1927–1937
Thomas Paterson	Country	Country	Gippsland	Vic	1922–1943
John Price	Labor	United Australia	Boothby	SA	1928–1941
John Prowse	Country	Country	Forrest	WA	1919–1943
Edward Charles Riley	Labor	Labor	Cook	NSW	1922–1934
Edward Riley	Labor	Labor	South Sydney	NSW	1910–1931
Darby Riordan	Labor	Labor	Kennedy	Qld	1929–1936
Albert Rowe	Labor	Labor	Parramatta	NSW	1929–1931
James Scullin	Labor	Labor	Yarra	Vic	1910–1913, 1922–1949
Percy Stewart	Country Progressive	Independent	Wimmera	Vic	1919–1931
Ted Theodore	Labor	Labor	Dalley	NSW	1927–1931
Victor Thompson	Country	Country	New England	NSW	1922–1940
James Tully	Labor	Labor	Barton	NSW	1928–1931
Eddie Ward		Lang Labor	East Sydney	NSW	1931, 1932–1963
David Watkins	Labor	Labor	Newcastle	NSW	1901–1935
John West	Labor		East Sydney	NSW	1910–1931
Thomas White	Nationalist	United Australia	Balaclava	Vic	1929–1951
George Edwin Yates	Labor	Labor	Adelaide	SA	1914–1919, 1922–1931
