= Bert Pratten =

Australian cricketer (1892–1979)

Personal information
- Full name: Herbert Graham Pratten
- Born: 22 April 1892; Ashfield, Sydney, Australia
- Died: 11 September 1979 (aged 87); Neutral Bay, New South Wales, Australia
- Batting: Right-handed
- Role: Batsman

Domestic team information
- Years: Team
- 1913/14–1914/15: New South Wales
- FC debut: 21 November 1913 New South Wales v Queensland
- Last FC: 8 January 1915 New South Wales v South Australia

Career statistics
Competition	First-class
Matches	5
Runs scored	221
Batting average	24.55
100s/50s	0/2
Top score	53
Catches/stumpings	1/0
- Source: CricketArchive, 31 December 2007

Herbert Graham Pratten (22 April 1892 – 11 September 1979) was an Australian cricketer. A right-handed batsman, he played first-class cricket for New South Wales between 1913 and 1915.

== Biography ==
Pratten was born in Sydney on 22 April 1892. His father Herbert Edward Pratten was a jam manufacturer who was later elected to federal parliament and served as a cabinet minister.

Pratten made his first-class debut for New South Wales against Queensland in November 1913, also playing a minor match against Ipswich and West Moreton the same month.

In 1914, after another first-class match against Queensland and a minor match against Toowoomba, Pratten played his first Sheffield Shield match against South Australia in December. He also played against Victoria that month before playing his final first-class match against South Australia in January 1915. He played a match for the Federated Malay States against the Straits Settlements in 1919 and died in Neutral Bay on 11 September 1979.
