= 1928 Martin by-election =

16 June 1928
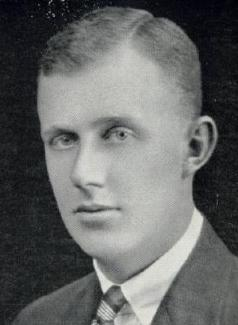
	First party	Second party
		ALP
Candidate	Graham Pratten	Percy Hannett
Party	Nationalist	Labor
Popular vote	29,482	18,922
Percentage	60.91%	39.09%
Swing	▼3.85pp	▲3.85pp
MP before election
Herbert Pratten
Nationalist
Elected MP
Graham Pratten
Nationalist

A by-election was held for the Australian House of Representatives seat of Martin on 16 June 1928. This was triggered by the death of Nationalist MP and Trade and Customs Minister Herbert Pratten.

The by-election was won by the Nationalist candidate, Pratten's nephew Graham.

== Results ==
Martin by-election, 1928
Party	Candidate	Votes	%	±%
Nationalist	Graham Pratten	29,482	60.91	−3.85
Labor	Percy Hannett	18,922	39.09	+3.85
Total formal votes		48,404	93.01	–5.02
Informal votes		3,635	6.99	+5.02
Turnout		52,039	87.41	−6.43
Nationalist hold		Swing	−3.85	
