= 1929 Australian federal election =

- 12 October 1929

All 76 (Note: The Northern Territory had one seat, but members for the territories did not have full voting rights until 1966 and did not count toward government formation.) seats in the Australian House of Representatives 38 seats were needed for a majority
- Registered: 3,539,120 ▲2.74%
- Turnout: 2,957,549 (94.85%) (Note: Turnout in contested seats) (▲1.21 pp)
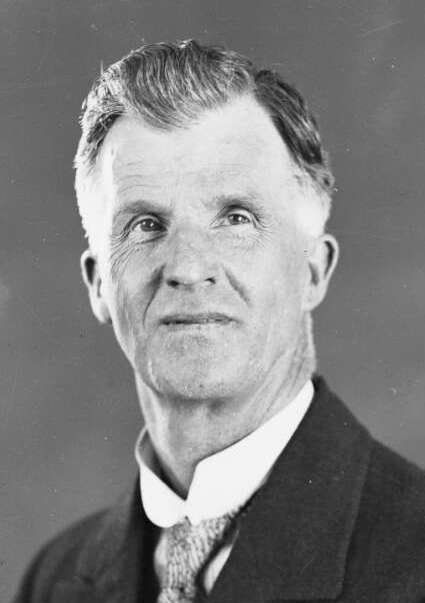

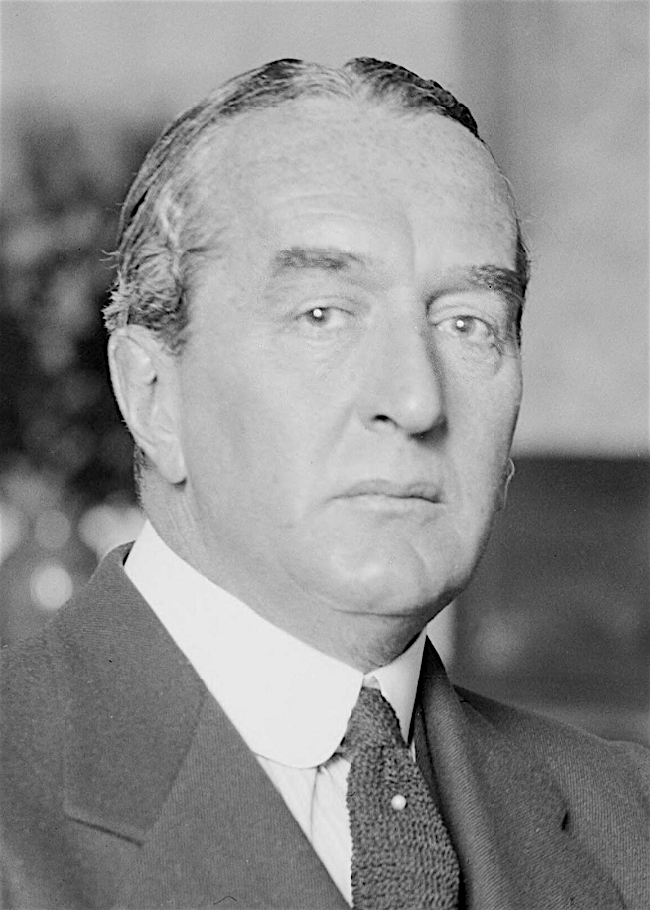

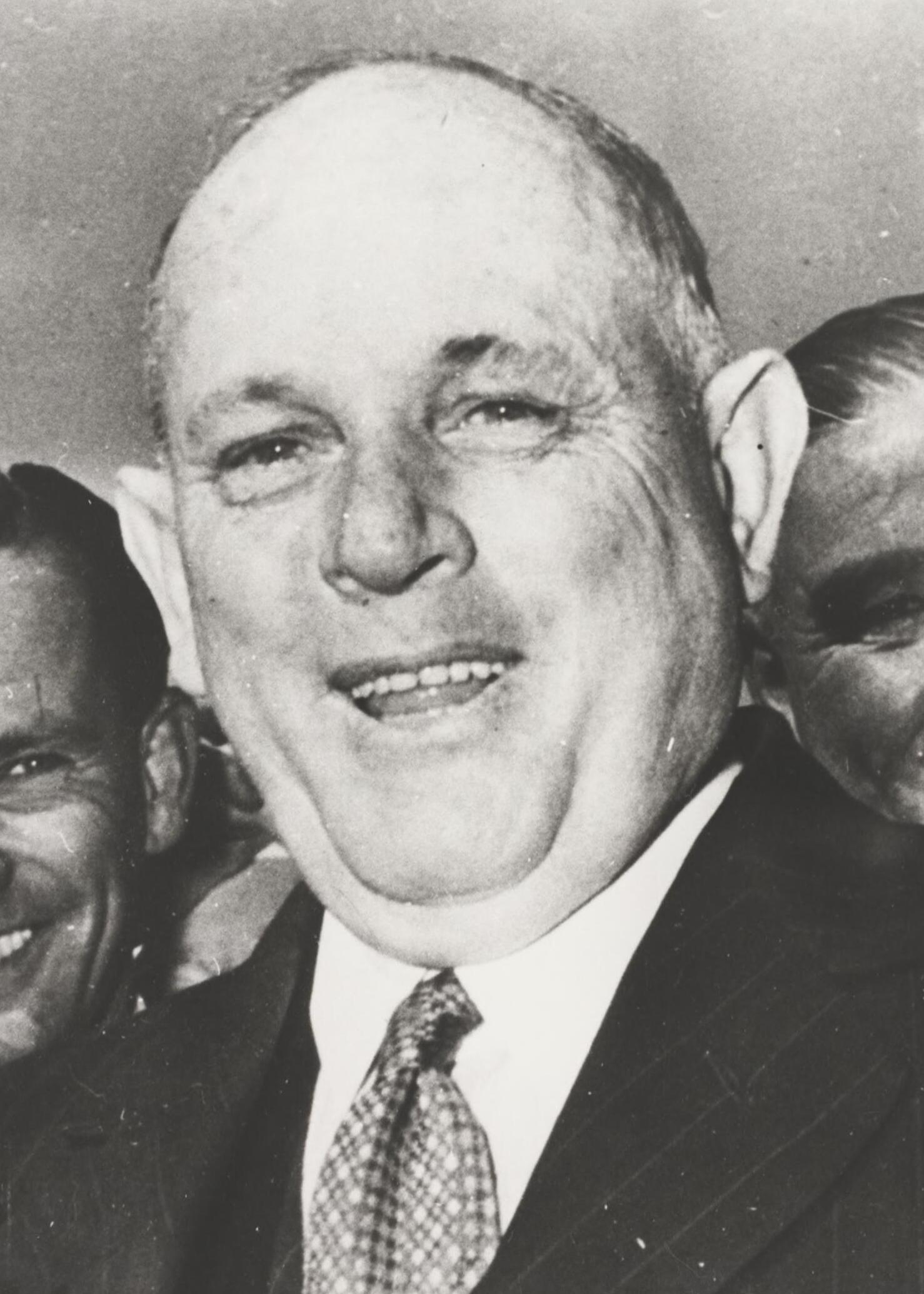
	First party	Second party
Leader	James Scullin	Stanley Bruce
Party	Labor	Nationalist–Country Coalition
Leader since	26 April 1928	9 February 1923
Leader's seat	Yarra (Vic.)	Flinders (Vic.) (lost seat)
Last election	31 seats	42 seats
Seats won	46 + NT	24
Seat change	▲15	▼18
Primary vote	1,406,327	1,271,619
Percentage	56.70%	43.30%
Swing	▲8.30%	▼8.30%
	Third party	Fourth party
		IND
Leader	Albert Dunstan	N/A
Party	Country Progressive	Independents
Leader since	April 1926	N/A
Leader's seat	N/A (Note: Albert Dunstan was the member for Korong and Eaglehawk in the Victorian Legislative Assembly and did not contest the federal election.)	N/A
Last election	1 seat	1 seats
Seats won	1	4 (Note: Including 3 incumbent Nationalist Party members who ran independently against the endorsed Nationalist candidate and won, retaining their seats at the election.)
Seat change	Steady	▲1
Primary vote	27,942	173,362
Percentage	0.97%	6.02%
Swing	▼0.64	▲2.61
- Results by division for the House of Representatives, shaded by winning party's margin of victory.
Prime Minister before election
Stanley Bruce
Nationalist/Country coalition
Subsequent Prime Minister
James Scullin
Labor

The 1929 Australian federal election was held in Australia on 12 October 1929. All 75 seats in the House of Representatives were up for election, but there was no Senate election. The election was caused by the defeat of the Stanley Bruce-Earle Page Government in the House of Representatives over the Maritime Industries Bill, Bruce having declared that the vote on the bill would constitute a vote of confidence in his government.

With senators having fixed six-year terms, the terms of those senators elected in 1926 were not due to expire until 1932. Under the Constitution of Australia, no election for their replacement could occur more than a year prior to their terms expiring, except in the case of a double dissolution; since the constitutional conditions for a double dissolution did not exist, it was not possible to hold a half-Senate election in 1929. This was the first Commonwealth election for the House of Representatives only.

In the election, the incumbent Nationalist-Country Coalition, led by Bruce and Page, was defeated in a landslide by the opposition Labor Party under James Scullin. Labor ended 13 years in opposition, having lost government two years after its previous election victory in 1914. James Scullin became Australia's first Catholic prime minister.

Labor won what was then its largest-ever majority in the House, but held only a minority of Senate seats as a result of the House-only election. The Nationalists had been in power since 1917, and in Coalition with the Country Party since 1923. This was the first and only time the Nationalists lost, as they merged to form the United Australia Party in 1931.

It was the only federal election in Australia's history at which no sitting members retired. It also saw the defeat of Prime Minister Stanley Bruce in his own seat of Flinders, the first time that an incumbent Prime Minister had been defeated for re-election in his own seat. That did not occur again until 2007, when John Howard lost his seat.

Future Prime Minister Joseph Lyons entered parliament at this election.

Although a non-Labor government was in office between 1932 and 1941, the 1929 election also marked the last time that a non-Labor government was voted out of office until 1972.

== Background ==
Conflict over industrial relations had dominated Stanley Bruce's government in 1929. Strikes and unrest in Newcastle and Hunter Region coalfields were the most widespread and severe, but disturbances within the waterfront, sugar, transport and timber industries were also ongoing. Throughout 1928 and 1929 economic conditions in Australia and internationally had been declining, whilst Australian debt had grown and revenues had shrunk. Facing major challenges, Bruce had embarked upon extensive negotiations throughout 1929 to tighten federal control over finance and industrial relations and to implement ameliorating policies in concert with the states. Instead, the Nationalist premiers met separately and demanded that Bruce return control of industrial arbitration to the individual states.

In August these issues came to a head. On 14 August, a motion of no-confidence was moved by Labor in response to Bruce's decision earlier in the year to drop prosecution of mine-owner John Brown for his part in the coalmine lock-outs in the Hunter Valley. The motion was defeated, but Billy Hughes and Edward Mann crossed the floor on the motion. Bruce subsequently excluded them from participating in party meetings. Bruce then introduced the Maritime Industries Bill, which would abolish the Commonwealth Court of Conciliation and Arbitration and make arbitration the exclusive domain of the states. In concert, Earle Page brought down his seventh and most stringent budget, which introduced new taxes and spending cuts in an attempt to fight the ballooning deficit. Both moves were highly controversial.

Hughes and Mann joined the opposition in denouncing the bill, and were joined by rebelling Nationalist George Maxwell and independent Percy Stewart. At the second reading of the bill in September, it was apparent that it would narrowly pass. However, when the bill entered the committee stage, Hughes moved an amendment that the bill should not be proclaimed until submitted to the people, either by referendum or general election. Attorney-General John Latham noted that the Commonwealth had no power to call a referendum, making general election the only constitutionally valid result of the amendment. Bruce agreed, stating that the amendment would constitute a vote of confidence in his government. The amendment had the support of the opposition, as well as the three Nationalist defectors. Independents Stewart and William McWilliams also indicated their support. The critical vote came down to Nationalist Walter Marks, who was known to be a supporter of the bill but unhappy with the government's handling of the movie industry, of which he was an ardent supporter. The new budget's "amusement tax" (which would harm film exhibitors) appeared to be the last straw, and Marks joined to defectors to vote for the amendment.

With the vote now likely 35–34 in favour of the amendment, the Government was faced with a dilemma. The Chairman of Committees, Nationalist James Bayley, could not cast a deliberative vote in committee, only a casting vote if the numbers were tied. However, it was possible for the Speaker, Nationalist Sir Littleton Groom, to cast a deliberative vote in the committee (though not on the floor of the House, where the Speaker has only a casting vote). Bruce implored Groom to vote against the amendment in committee so that Bayley could defeat the measure with his tie-breaking vote. However, Groom was steadfast that he would follow the British House of Commons (though not Australian) precedent that the Speaker remain impartial and not vote in committee. There was also some suspicion of vengeance in his decision, as Groom had been demoted from Attorney-General to Speaker a few years previously, a move he had reputedly been unhappy about. With Groom abstaining, the amendment passed by one vote as predicted. Treating the passage of the amendment as a defeat in a motion of no-confidence, Bruce announced to the House on 12 September that the Governor-General had accepted his advice to call an election, despite some speculation a government led by John Latham, James Scullin, or Billy Hughes might be attempted.

== Results ==
Nationalist: 14 seats Labor: 46 seats Country: 10 seats Country Progressive: 1 seat Independent: 4 seats

House of Reps (IRV) – 1929–31—Turnout 94.85% (CV) – Informal 2.65%
Party	First preference votes	%	Swing	Seats	Change
Labor	1,406,327	48.84	+4.20	47 (Note: Including Northern Territory)	+15
Nationalist–Country coalition	1,271,619	44.16	–5.40	24	–18
Nationalist	975,979	33.90	–5.20	14	–15
Country	295,640	10.27	–0.20	10	–3
Country Progressive	27,942	0.97	–0.64	1	0
Independents	173,362	6.02	+2.61	4	+3
Total	2,879,250			76	
Two-party-preferred (estimated)
Labor	Win	56.70	+8.30	46	+15
Nationalist–Country coalition		43.30	−8.30	24	–18

Notes

- Independents: Billy Hughes (North Sydney, NSW), George Maxwell (Fawkner, Vic.), Walter Marks (Wentworth, NSW), William McWilliams (Franklin, Tas.)
- Nine members were elected unopposed – six Labor and three Country.
- No separate Senate election was held – see here for Senate composition.

First preference vote
Labor	48.84%
Nationalist	33.90%
Country	10.27%
Country Progressive	0.97%
Independent	6.02%

Two-party-preferred vote
Labor	56.70%
Coalition	43.30%

Parliament seats
Labor	61.33%
Coalition	32.00%
Country Progressive	1.33%
Independent	5.33%

== Seats changing hands ==
Seat	Pre-1929			Swing	Post-1929		
Seat	Party	Member	Margin	Swing	Margin	Member	Party
Angas, SA	Nationalist	Walter Parsons	9.4	14.1	4.7	Moses Gabb	Labor
Bass, Tas	Nationalist	Syd Jackson	3.1	13.5	10.4	Allan Guy	Labor
Bendigo, Vic	Nationalist	Geoffry Hurry	3.1	8.2	5.1	Richard Keane	Labor
Calare, NSW	Nationalist	Neville Howse	10.7	12.3	1.6	George Gibbons	Labor
Corangamite, Vic	Country	William Gibson	3.0	5.1	2.1	Richard Crouch	Labor
Corio, Vic	Nationalist	John Lister	8.5	14.5	6.0	Arthur Lewis	Labor
Eden-Monaro, NSW	Nationalist	John Perkins	7.6	7.7	0.1	John Cusack	Labor
Fawkner, Vic	Nationalist	George Maxwell	N/A	23.1	11.4	George Maxwell	Ind. Nationalist
Flinders, Vic	Nationalist	Stanley Bruce	10.7	10.9	0.2	Jack Holloway	Labor
Gwydir, NSW	Country	Aubrey Abbott	2.3	6.0	3.7	Lou Cunningham	Labor
Kennedy, Qld	Nationalist	Grosvenor Francis	2.4	5.5	3.1	Darby Riordan	Labor
Martin, NSW	Nationalist	Graham Pratten	6.9	13.3	6.4	John Eldridge	Labor
North Sydney, NSW	Nationalist	Billy Hughes	N/A	32.3	16.1	Billy Hughes	Ind. Nationalist
Parkes, NSW	Nationalist	Charles Marr	7.4	15.2	7.8	Edward McTiernan	Labor
Parramatta, NSW	Nationalist	Eric Bowden	10.1	13.4	3.3	Albert Rowe	Labor
Wakefield, SA	Country	Maurice Collins	9.6	16.5	6.9	Charles Hawker	Nationalist
Wannon, Vic	Nationalist	Arthur Rodgers	2.8	4.8	2.0	John McNeill	Labor
Wentworth, NSW	Nationalist	Walter Marks	11.5	19.8	8.3	Walter Marks	Ind. Nationalist
Wilmot, Tas	Nationalist	Llewellyn Atkinson	4.6	N/A	2.9	Joseph Lyons	Labor

== See also ==
- Candidates of the Australian federal election, 1929
- Members of the Australian House of Representatives, 1929-1931
