= William Amiet =

Writer and barrister (1890–1959)

William Albert Amiet (3 June 1890 – 13 April 1959) was an Australian writer and barrister.

Amiet was born at Murgheboluc near Geelong to farmer Edward William Amiet and Mary Ann, née Begley. He attended state school before studying at the University of Melbourne, from which he received a Bachelor of Arts in 1911 and a Master of Arts in 1913. He settled in Queensland, organising concerts by the Young Men's Christian Association for railway workers and teaching at Maryborough Grammar School, Queensland. In 1915 he moved to Brisbane, and having acquired legal qualifications became a barrister in 1915. He enlisted in the Australian Imperial Force on 2 May 1916 and set sail for England in October, seeing active service in France from June 1917. Commissioned on 1 August 1918, he was wounded at Bellicourt in October and mentioned in despatches.

After the war Amiet studied at King's College London for a short time before he returned to Brisbane on the termination of his appointment on 30 December 1919. On 17 December 1923 he married Agnes May Hurley at Mackay, where he was in a legal partnership with Vincent Macrossan. He ran unsuccessfully for Herbert as a Nationalist in the 1929 federal election. He wrote sporadically for the Mackay Daily Mercury for many years and in 1932 published Literature by Languages: A Roll Call, a survey of world literature. His later publications included A Shakespeare or Two (1935), The Practice of Literary History (1936), Courses in Literary History (1938), Scrambled Scrutinies (1949), and Metrical Diversions of a Sexagenarian (1952). Amiet's diverse interests included astronomy and Australian literature. He opposed the White Australia policy during the 1930s and gave his support to recruitment drives during World War II. An agnostic, he died in 1959 at Mater Hospital, Mackay, of cardiorenal failure. The Amiet Memorial Library in Mackay is named for him.
