= Herbert Pratten =

Australian politician (1865–1928)

The Honourable Herbert Pratten
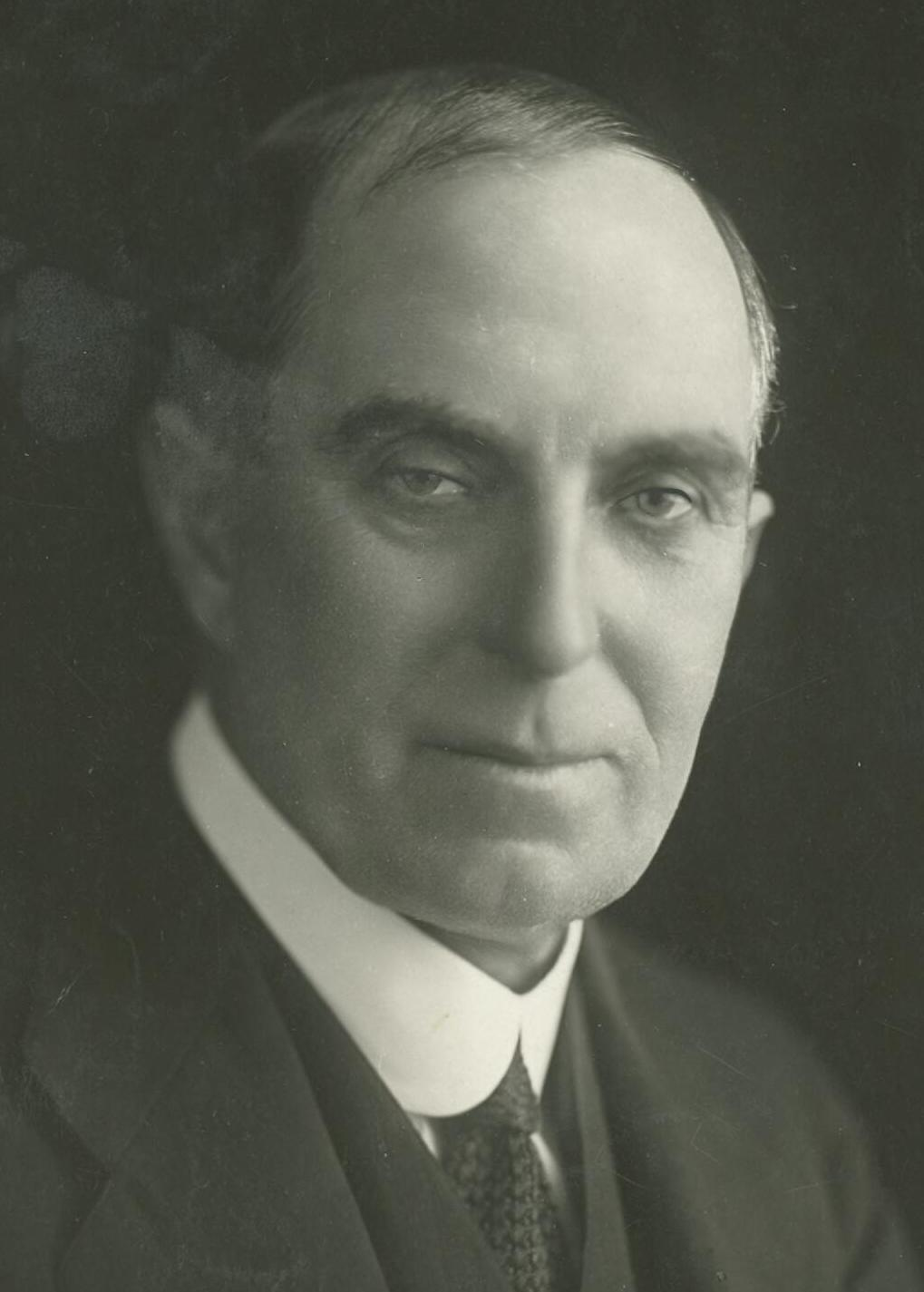

Minister for Trade and Customs
- In office 13 June 1924 – 7 May 1928
- Prime Minister: Stanley Bruce
- Preceded by: Austin Chapman
- Succeeded by: Stanley Bruce

Minister for Health
- In office 13 June 1924 – 16 January 1925
- Prime Minister: Stanley Bruce
- Preceded by: Austin Chapman
- Succeeded by: Neville Howse

Member of the Australian Parliament for Martin
- In office 16 December 1922 – 7 May 1928
- Preceded by: New seat
- Succeeded by: Graham Pratten

Member of the Australian Parliament for Parramatta
- In office 10 December 1921 – 16 December 1922
- Preceded by: Joseph Cook
- Succeeded by: Eric Bowden

Senator for New South Wales
- In office 1 July 1917 – 23 November 1921
- Succeeded by: Henry Garling

Personal details
- Born: 7 May 1865 Mangotsfield, Gloucestershire, England
- Died: 7 May 1928 (aged 63) Turramurra, New South Wales, Australia
- Party: Nationalist
- Relations: Bert Pratten (son); Graham Pratten (nephew)
- Occupation: Jam manufacturer

Herbert Edward Pratten (7 May 1865 – 7 May 1928) was an Australian businessman and politician. He served as Minister for Health (1924–1925) and Minister for Trade and Customs (1924–1928) in the Bruce–Page government.

Pratten was born in England. He joined John Lysaght and Co. at the age of 15 and moved to Sydney in 1884 to join the firm's Australian division. He developed diverse business interests across printing, mining and the food and beverage industry, and became known as a writer on Australia's commercial relationship with Asia. Pratten was elected as a Senator for New South Wales at the 1917 federal election, representing the Nationalist Party. He transferred to the House of Representatives at the 1921 Parramatta by-election and was considered a candidate to replace Billy Hughes as Nationalist leader and prime minister after the 1922 election. The role was taken by S. M. Bruce and Pratten went on to serve as a minister in the new government from 1924 until his death in 1928.

== Early life ==
Pratten was born on 7 May 1865 in Mangotsfield, Gloucestershire, England. He was the son of Ann Rebecca (née Vowles) and Herbert Graham Pratten; his mother died in 1870.

Pratten was educated at the Merchant Venturers' Technical College and the Bristol Trade and Mining School. At the age of 15, he joined the iron and steel company John Lysaght and Co., based in Bristol. He was sent to Sydney in 1884 to become a clerk at the firm's new Australian branch, working under William Sandford at Five Dock.

== Business career ==
In about 1888, Pratten established a soft drink company in Ashfield, New South Wales. He founded a printing company in 1889 and arranged for his half-brother Frederick to immigrate from England. Their company Pratten Bros. became "one of the largest of its kind in Australia". In 1895, he also acquired Taylor Bros., a jam manufacturer which had been indebted to him. He sold the company a few years before World War I at a substantial profit. Pratten was also a director of the Stanmore Preserving Company, which exported fruit pulp to Europe using newly developed cold-storage techniques. In 1911, he established the Hargraves Consolidated Goldmining Company to take advantage of a government subsidy. He later co-founded the Austral-Malay Tin Mining Company with Ambrose Freeman, which in 1926 was consolidated into Larut Tin Fields Limited.

Pratten visited Asia for business reasons on several occasions. He wrote a series of articles for The Daily Telegraph about his 1906 trip to the Philippines, Japan, China, Malaya, Singapore, and India, which in 1908 he published in book form as Asiatic Impressions. He dedicated the book to "all Australians who realise the many racial dangers that the future may have in store for our beautiful land". His second book Through Orient to Occident (1912) recounted a journey to South-East Asia and China and his experience on the Trans-Siberian Railway. Pratten believed that the economic growth of Asia was both a threat and an opportunity for Australia. He recommended that the federal government place trade commissions in Calcutta and Shanghai.

== Public life ==
Pratten served on the Ashfield Municipal Council from 1905 to 1912, including as mayor from 1909 to 1911. Pratten Park was named in his honour when it opened in 1912. Pratten was also president of the New South Wales Chamber of Manufactures from 1912 to 1914.

== Political career ==
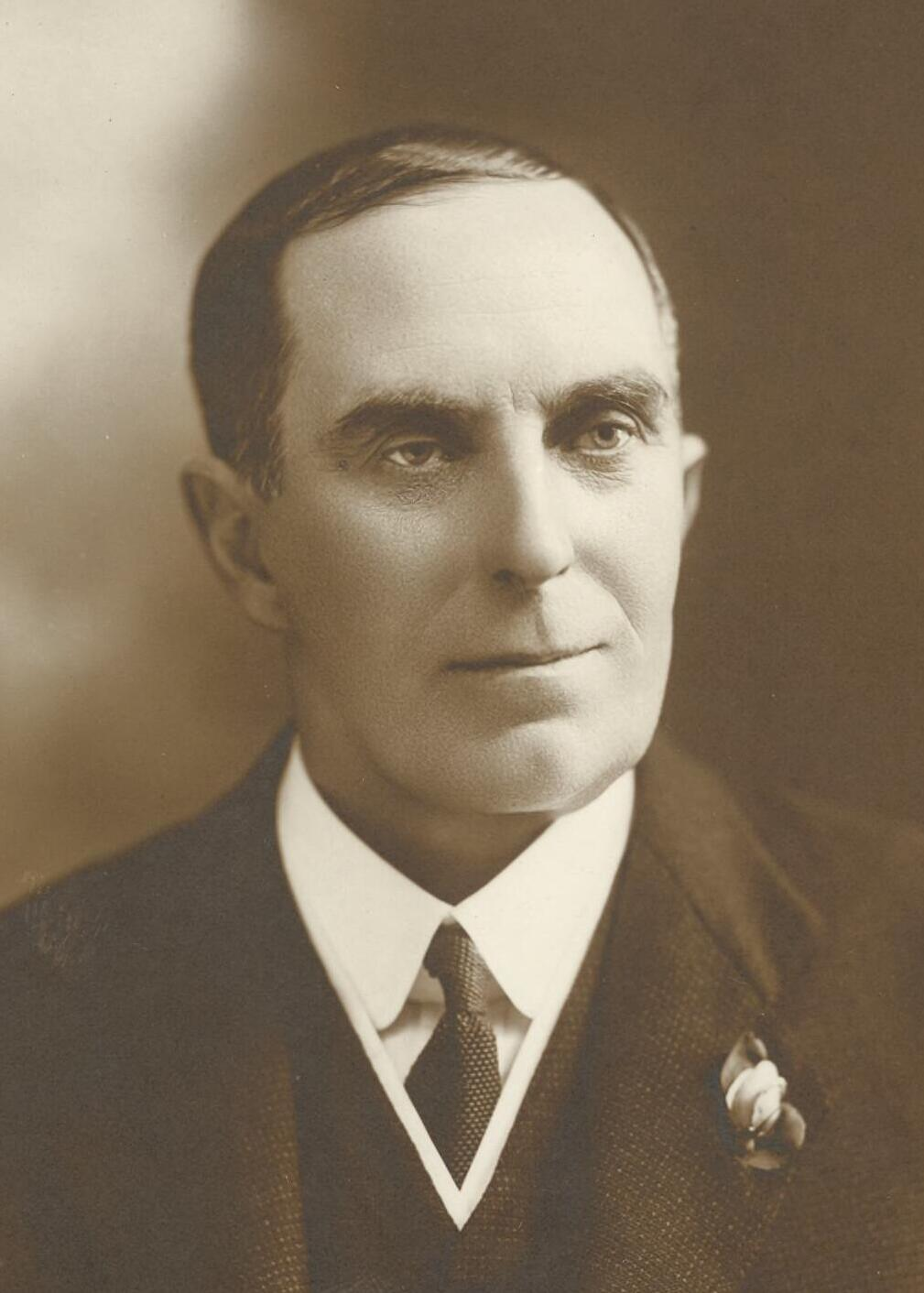
Pratten during his time in the Senate

Pratten first stood for federal parliament at the 1910 election, running unsuccessfully as an independent in the Division of Parkes. He was a Liberal candidate for the Senate at the 1914 election, but was defeated.

=== Senator, 1917–1921 ===
In 1917, Pratten was elected to the Senate as a Nationalist. He spoke on a variety of topics but was particularly interested in economic matters. He argued for more private-sector experience in the Defence Department, opposed financing budget deficits with overseas loans, and argued against the creation of a department akin to the United States Department of Commerce, which he believed was too powerful. Pratten was also interested in reforming parliamentary procedure, suggesting that public servants should be directly questioned by parliament and supporting Josiah Thomas's unsuccessful motion to force ministers in each chamber of parliament to appear in the other chamber to answer questions.

Pratten was elected deputy president of the New South Wales National Association in 1920. In November 1921, he resigned from the Senate to contest the 1921 Parramatta by-election, caused by Sir Joseph Cook's resignation.

=== 1922 election and coalition formation ===
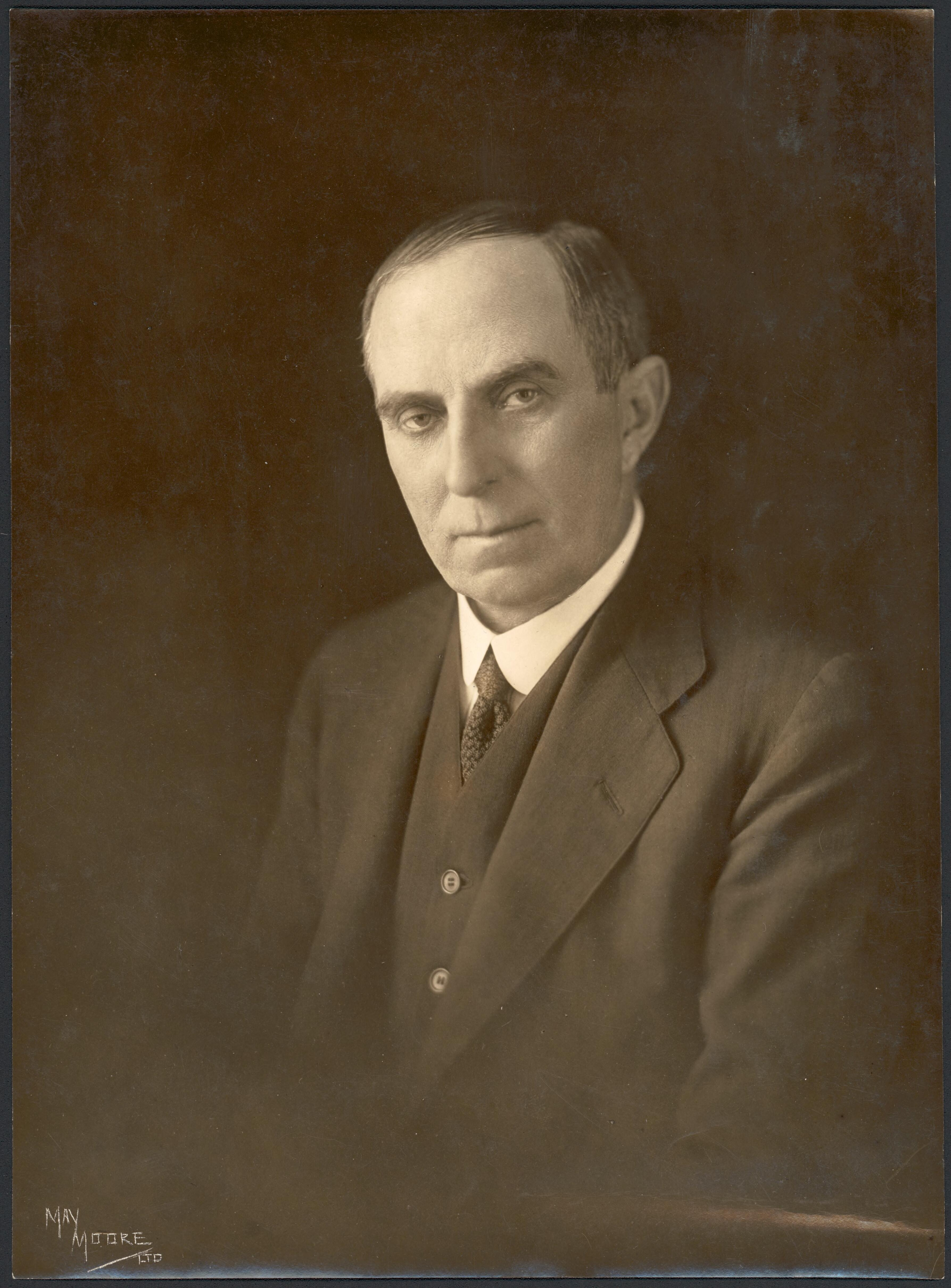
Pratten in 1923

After a redistribution Pratten transferred to the new Division of Martin at the 1922 election. The election resulted in a hung parliament with the Country Party holding the balance of power. Pratten played a key role in negotiating a coalition, which saw Stanley Bruce replace Billy Hughes as prime minister and Country Party leader Earle Page become deputy prime minister. For a brief period in January 1923, it was rumoured that Pratten himself would replace Hughes as prime minister, despite having no ministerial experience. Sydney's Evening News definitively reported that either Pratten or Earle Page would lead the next government. In response, he issued a statement to the press stating that he was surprised by the reports and that no overtures had been made to him. The following week, Melbourne's Herald reported that Pratten would likely become deputy prime minister in a government led by Page, while The Sydney Morning Herald reported that Bruce would become prime minister and Pratten would be his deputy.

=== Government minister, 1924–1928 ===
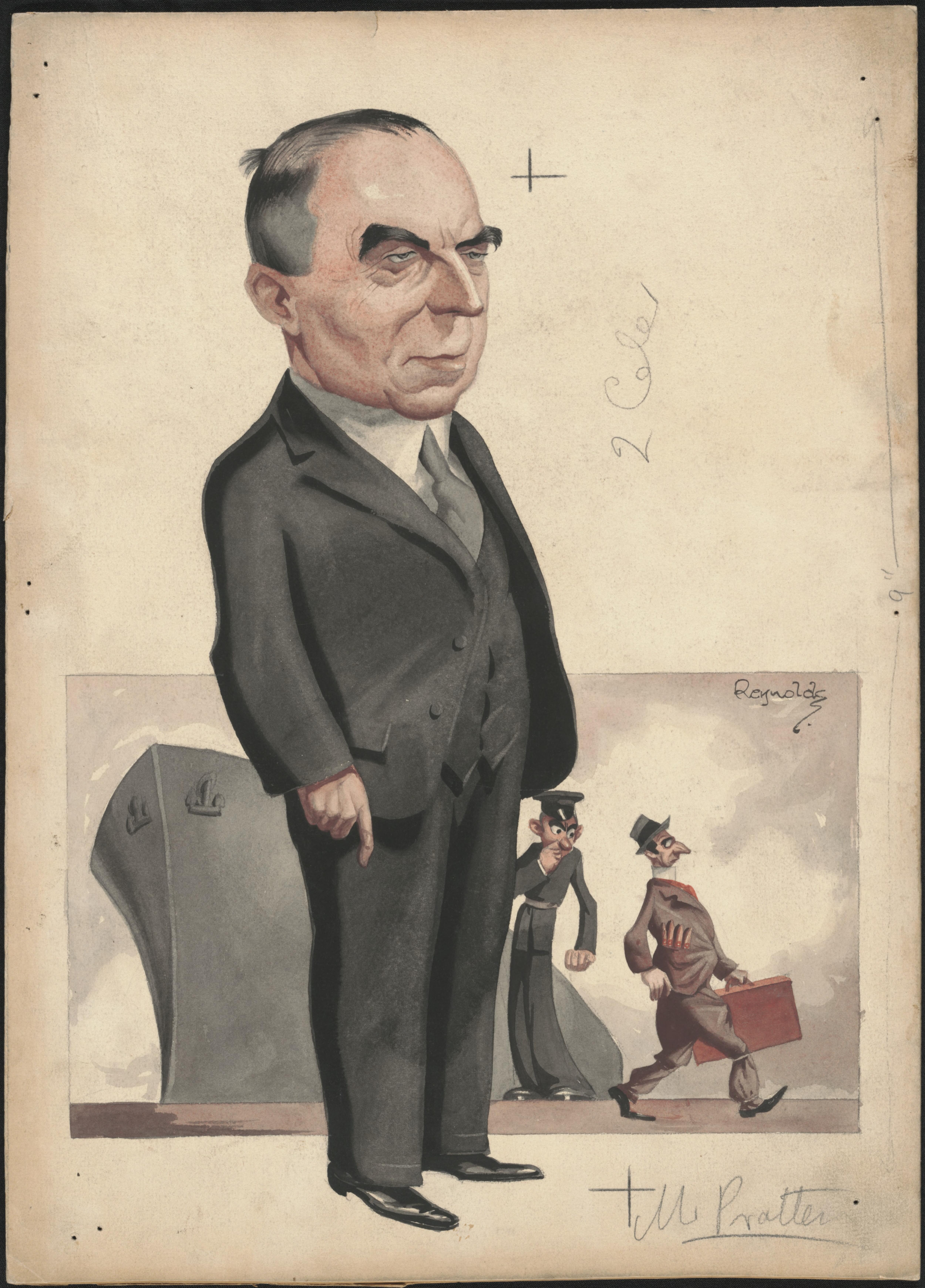
Caricature of Pratten published in 1928 by Len Reynolds

It had been expected that Pratten would take the trade and customs portfolio in the Bruce–Page Ministry, but he was unexpectedly omitted. The Age reported that he had been "accepted by every member in the House as a certainty in whatever Cabinet might be constituted".

Pratten was eventually elevated to cabinet in June 1924, following Austin Chapman's resignation. He was appointed Minister for Trade and Customs and Minister for Health; he relinquished the latter portfolio to Neville Howse in January 1925. As trade minister, Pratten was considered a strong protectionist, believing Australia needed a high-tariff policy in order to protect its local industry from currency depreciation and dumping. However, he also supported Imperial Preference. He introduced legislation to establish the Tariff Board on a permanent basis, and introduced major amendments to the Customs Tariff Act – in 1925 to increase duties on imported textiles and in 1926 to increase duties on imported iron and steel.

== Personal life ==
Pratten married Agnes Wright, the daughter of a business partner, on 29 May 1891. The couple had two sons and three daughters together, including Herbert Graham Pratten who played first-class cricket for New South Wales. Pratten died in May 1928 on his 63rd birthday, suffering a cerebral haemorrhage while addressing a Nationalist women's meeting in Turramurra. He was succeeded in federal parliament by his nephew Frederick Graham Pratten, who won the 1928 Martin by-election.

Parliament of Australia
Preceded by Joseph Cook	Member for Parramatta; 1921–1922	Succeeded by Eric Bowden
New division	Member for Martin; 1922–1928	Succeeded by Graham Pratten
Political offices
Preceded by Littleton Groom	Minister for Health; 1924–1925	Succeeded by Neville Howse
Preceded by Littleton Groom	Minister for Trade and Customs; 1924–1928	Succeeded by Stanley Bruce
