= Geoffry Hurry =

Australian politician

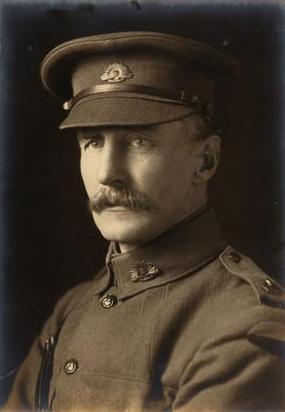

Member of the Australian Parliament for Bendigo
- In office 16 December 1922 – 12 October 1929
- Preceded by: Billy Hughes
- Succeeded by: Richard Keane

Personal details
- Born: 15 September 1868 Kyneton, Victoria
- Died: 7 February 1951 (aged 82)
- Party: Nationalist Party of Australia
- Occupation: Solicitor

Geoffry Hurry (15 September 1868 – 7 February 1951) was an Australian politician. He was a Nationalist Party member of the Australian House of Representatives from 1922 to 1929.

Hurry was born in Kyneton, Victoria and was educated at Melbourne Grammar School and the University of Melbourne. He was admitted as a solicitor in 1892 and entered into partnership with his father as H. Hurry & Son in the same year. He practised as a solicitor until his election to parliament, but also acquired ownership of Kenny's Family Hotel in 1913. He was a long-serving member of the Kyneton Shire Council until 1916 and was shire president in 1909–10, and was a committee member of the Kyneton Water Trust, Kyneton Progress Association and West Kyneton Mineral Springs Committee. A keen sportsman, he was also involved in local sporting organisations, serving on the committee of the Kyneton tennis club and as a selector for the Kyneton cricket club.

A long-serving officer in the army reserve who had commanded his unit, Hurry enlisted for active service in World War I in May 1916 at the age of 47 and embarked for France in June. He served as a major in the 38th infantry battalion, and was granted the Distinguished Service Order for "conspicuous gallantry and devotion to duty when in command of his battalion in action" in May 1918; he was promoted to temporary lieutenant-colonel later that month. He returned to Melbourne in December 1919, and his promotion was made permanent in August 1920.

In 1922, he was elected to the Australian House of Representatives as the Nationalist member for Bendigo, succeeding Prime Minister Billy Hughes, who transferred to North Sydney, and defeating Edmund Jowett, the Country Party member for the abolished seat of Grampians. Hurry held the seat until his defeat by Labor candidate Richard Keane in 1929 after the Country Party decided to run against him, disregarding a pact against contesting the same seats. He sued Keane and others for libel after the election over a campaign pamphlet, but withdrew the action in June 1930.

He returned to legal practice after his parliamentary defeat. He remained involved in community affairs, as vice-president of the Kyneton Choral Society and a life governor of the Bendigo Benevolent Asylum; he also funded a book detailing the history of his former battalion. He died at Frankston in 1951 and was cremated at Fawkner Crematorium.

Parliament of Australia
Preceded by Billy Hughes	Member for Bendigo; 1922 – 1929	Succeeded by Richard Keane
