= Walter Marks (politician) =

Australian politician (1875–1951)

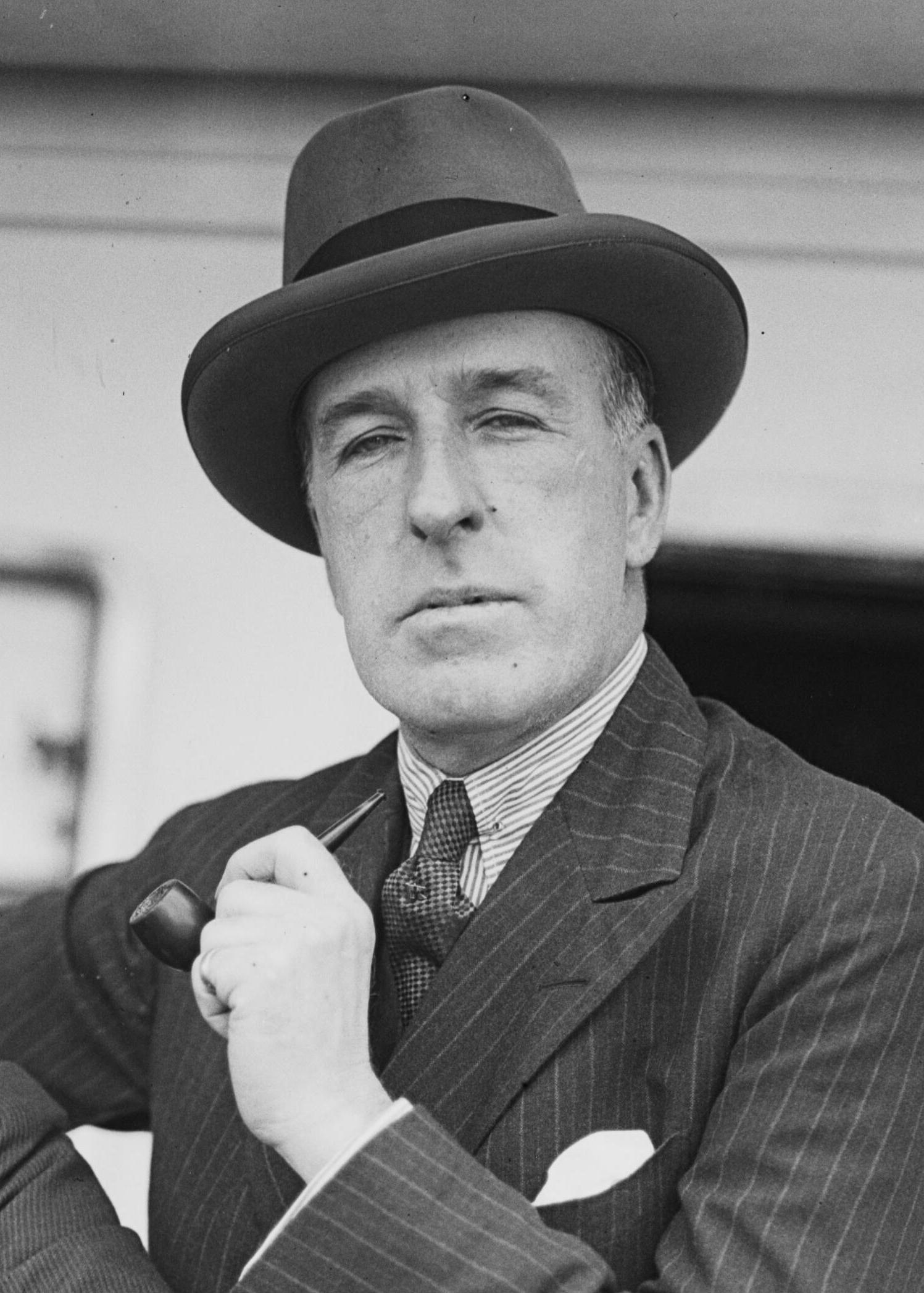

Member of the Australian Parliament for Wentworth
- In office 13 December 1919 – 19 December 1931
- Preceded by: Willie Kelly
- Succeeded by: Eric Harrison

Personal details
- Born: 6 June 1875 Jamberoo, New South Wales
- Died: 31 March 1951 (aged 75) Paddington, New South Wales
- Party: Nationalist (to 1929); Independent (1929); Australian (1929–30); Independent (1930–31); UAP (from 1931)
- Spouse: Florence Sandford (m. 1901)
- Relations: James Marks (father); John Marks (uncle)
- Occupation: Solicitor

Walter Moffitt Marks (6 June 1875 – 31 March 1951) was an Australian lawyer and politician. He served as a member of the House of Representatives from 1919 to 1931, representing the Division of Wentworth in New South Wales.

== Early life ==
Marks was born on 6 June 1875 at his father's property Culwalla Homestead near Jamberoo, New South Wales. He was one of six children born to Sarah Jane (née Moffitt) and James Marks. His father and uncle John Marks both served in the colonial parliament, as did his father's uncle Samuel Charles. His maternal grandfather William Moffitt had arrived in New South Wales as a convict but became a wealthy businessman.

Marks and his family moved to Sydney when he was a young boy, where he attended Sydney Grammar School. After serving his articles of clerkship he was admitted to practise as a solicitor in 1902. He inherited substantial wealth and developed "extensive investments in city property and the coal industry", including partly financing the building of his chambers, the twelve-storey Culwulla Chambers in Castlereagh Street, Sydney, which was the tallest building in central Sydney until after World War II.

Marks won most major Australian yachting trophies in Culwulla I-IV, and participated in the trials of Sir Thomas Lipton's America's Cup challenger, Shamrock IV in 1914. In World War I he joined the Royal Navy Volunteer Reserve and served as a lieutenant in the North Sea and English Channel, commanded a gunnery school in Wales and returned to Australia in 1918 to encourage military recruitment.

== Politics ==
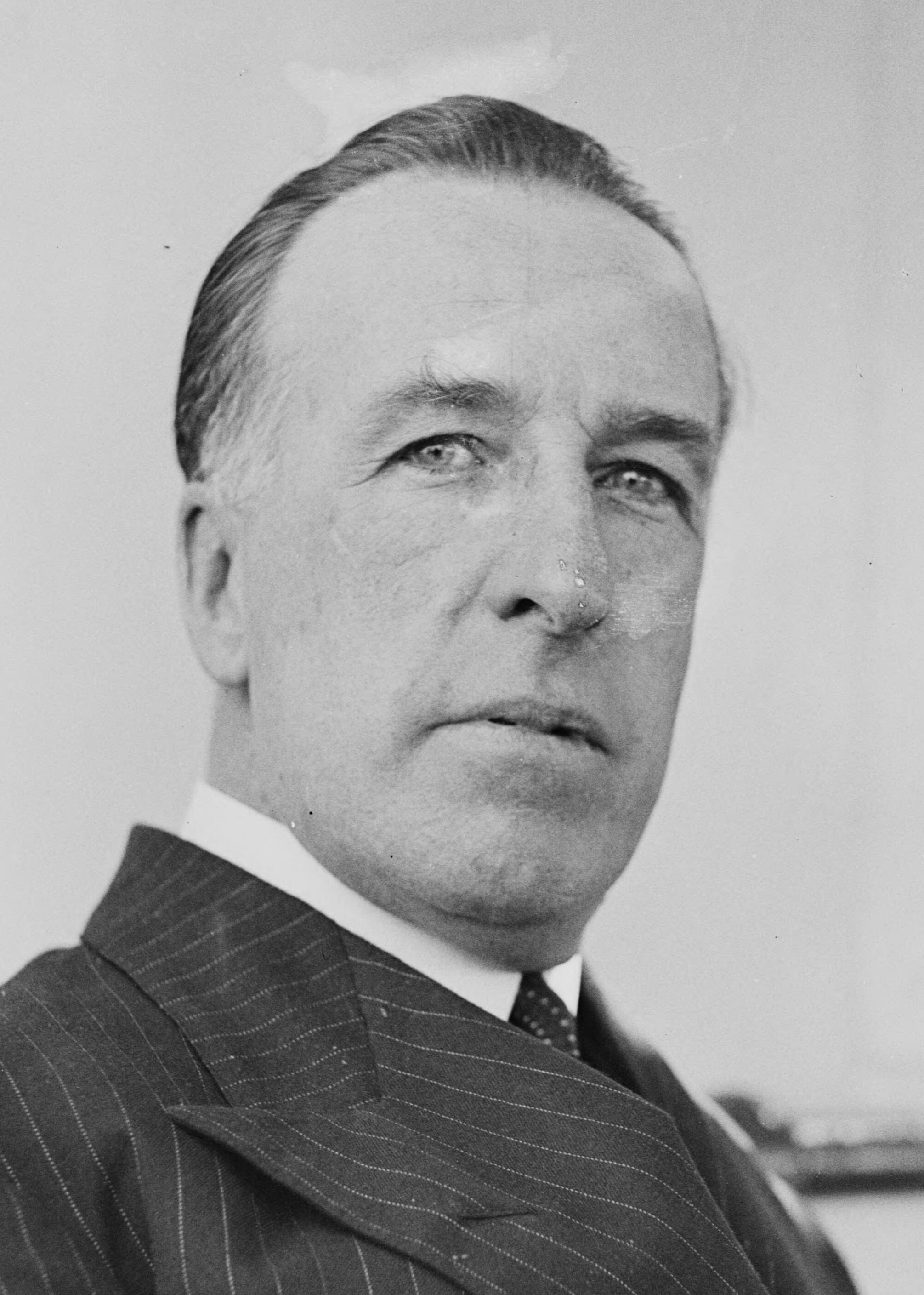
Marks in 1929

Marks was elected to parliament at the 1919 federal election, winning the Division of Wentworth as a Nationalist.

In a speech to the House of Representatives on 3 November 1921, Marks predicted that Armageddon would occur in 1934. He said that the Bible had foretold that a great battle would be fought in Jerusalem between the British Empire on one side and Germany, Russia and another great nation on the other side. This would be followed by the Second Coming of Christ, who would direct the Royal Navy to collect his chosen people from around the world and bring them to Palestine.

Marks had been considered for promotion to a ministerial post, but was passed over. The Sydney Morning Herald noted that "his utterances regarding Armageddon are believed to have interfered with his prospects". However, in December 1921 he was appointed by Billy Hughes to the position of undersecretary in the Prime Minister's Department, assisting the departmental secretary Percy Deane and also answering questions on behalf of the prime minister in the House of Representatives. He received no official salary in the position, but additional compensation was paid to him out of the salaries of the ministers. Stanley Bruce abolished the position when he succeeded Hughes as prime minister in 1923.

Marks took a strong interest in foreign affairs, aviation and the film industry. He was one of seven Nationalists – including Hughes – who voted to bring down the Bruce government, forcing the 1929 election. Although he lost Nationalist Party endorsement, he was re-elected as an independent. Shortly after the election, he joined Hughes' new Australian Party. However, his time there was short-lived, as he resigned in September 1930 over policy differences and returned to sit as an independent. Marks joined the new United Australia Party on its formation in May 1931, but was defeated at the 1931 election by another UAP candidate, Eric Harrison.

== Later life ==
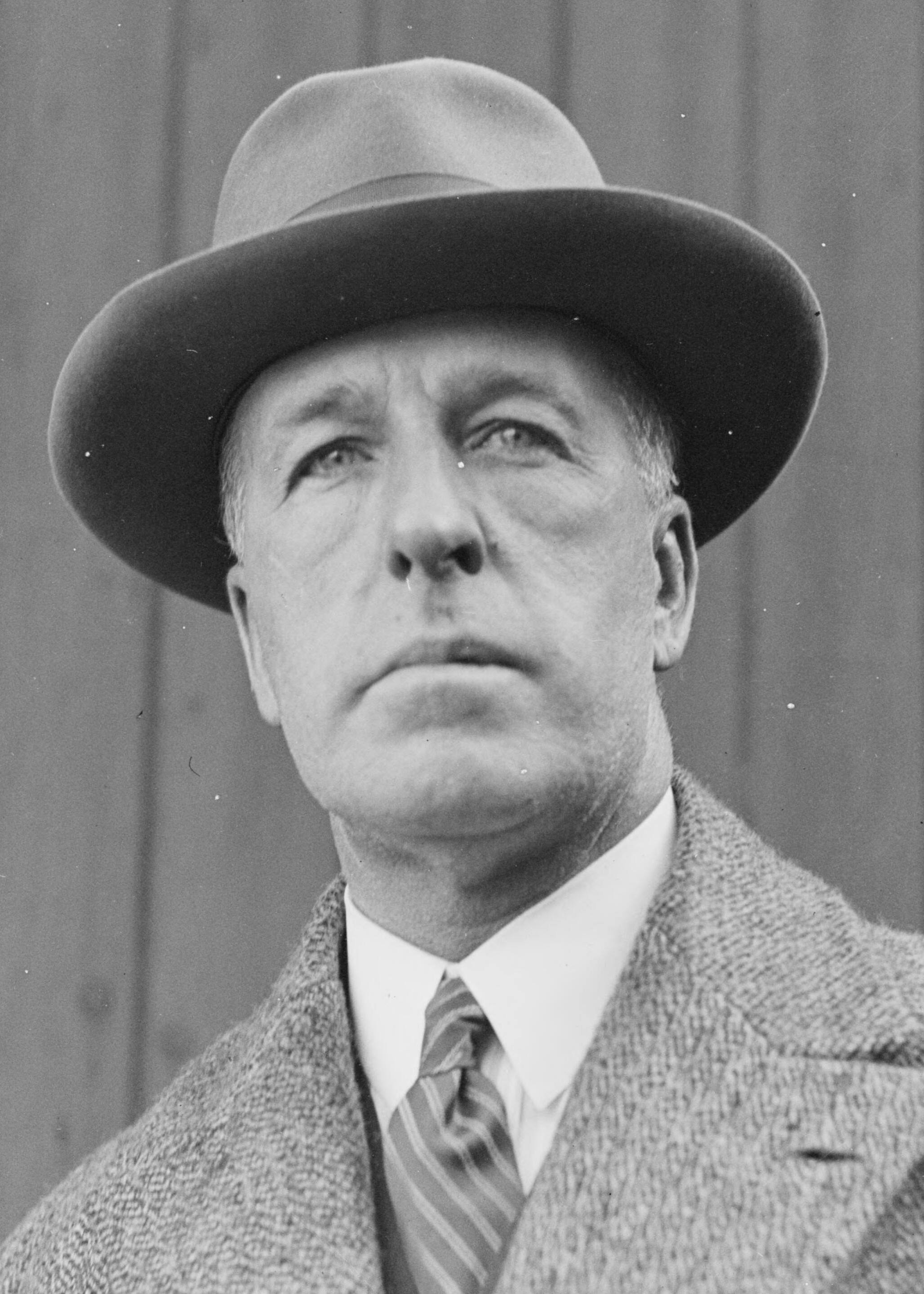
Marks later in life

Marks returned to his law practice after losing his seat. In 1937, he became the inaugural chairman of the Papuan Apinaipi Petroleum Company. He was commodore of the Royal Prince Alfred Yacht Club for seven years. Marks died at the age of 75, following surgery in the Sydney suburb of Paddington. He was survived by a son and a daughter.

== Notes ==
Parliament of Australia
| Preceded by Willie Kelly | Member for Wentworth; 1919–1931 | Succeeded by Eric Harrison |
