= John Eldridge (politician) =

Australian politician

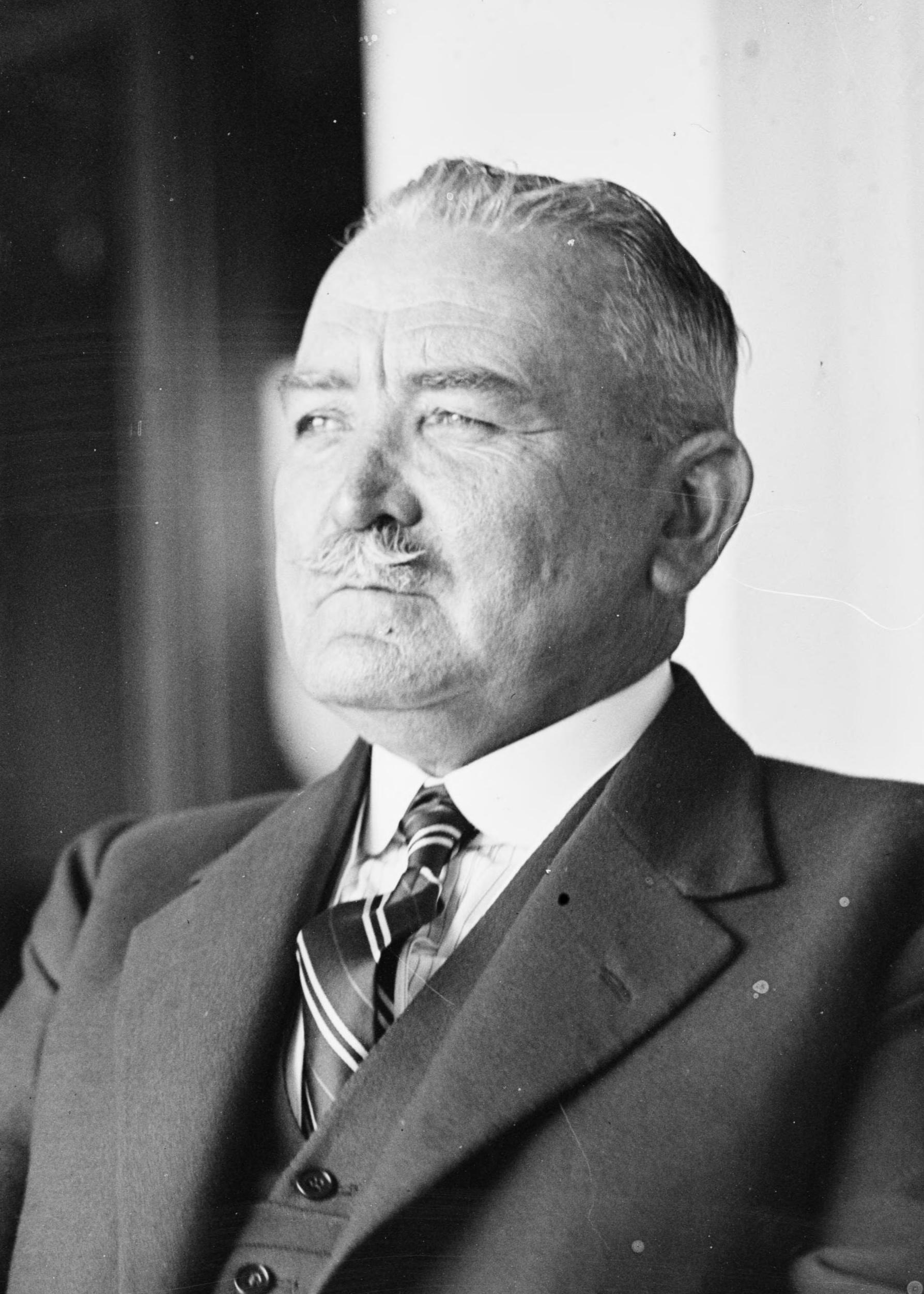
- Eldridge in 1929

Member of the Australian Parliament for Martin
- In office 12 October 1929 – 19 December 1931
- Preceded by: Graham Pratten
- Succeeded by: William Holman

Personal details
- Born: 1872 Calcutta, India
- Died: 17 April 1954 (aged 81–82) Sydney, New South Wales, Australia
- Party: Labor (1929–31); Lang Labor (1931)
- Spouse: Marie Mertel
- Occupation: Public servant

John Chambers Eldridge (1872 – 17 April 1954) was an Australian politician, public servant and eugenicist. He was a member of the Australian Labor Party (ALP) and served in the House of Representatives from 1929 to 1931, representing the seat of Martin. He was associated with the Lang Labor faction and ran for parliament unsuccessfully at state and federal level on a number of occasions. Outside of politics he was a long-serving public servant in New South Wales and co-founded the Eugenics Education Society of New South Wales, serving as secretary from 1912 to 1922.

== Early life ==
Eldridge was born in 1872 in Calcutta, British India. He was said to be a member of "an old Sydney pioneering family".

Eldridge moved to New South Wales at a young age and attended public schools at Cootamundra and Marrickville, completing his secondary education at the Fort Street Model School in Sydney. He later studied economics at the University of Sydney, where he claimed to have been awarded an undergraduate certificate although there is no record of his admission as a graduate. Eldridge joined the New South Wales Public Service in 1890 as a junior draughtsman in the Sewerage Department. He eventually became attached to the State Labour Bureau and served as secretary to its long-serving directory William Schey.

Eldridge enlisted in the Australian Imperial Force (AIF) in November 1916 as a gunner in the Field Artillery, at which point he was a resident of Dawes Point. He was sent overseas in June 1918 and saw limited active service. He was later active in the AIF's educational section, receiving leave to attend the London School of Economics from May to December 1919.

In 1920, following the election of a Labor government under John Storey, Eldridge was appointed as the first under-secretary for motherhood within Greg McGirr's Department of Public Health and Motherhood. He was involved in the drafting of a "motherhood endowment" scheme, which would have provided welfare payments to mothers funded by a state lottery scheme. Eldridge also served as Executive Secretary of the New South Wales Commission for the British Empire Exhibition and Secretary of the New South Wales Commission for the New Zealand Exhibition; during the mid-1920s, he was an officer with the state Department of Labour and Industry. He founded the Social Science Service of Australia, was president of the New South Wales Pedestrians Association and patron of the League of New South Wales Wheelmen, and was a member of the Returned Soldiers' Association.

== Eugenics advocacy ==
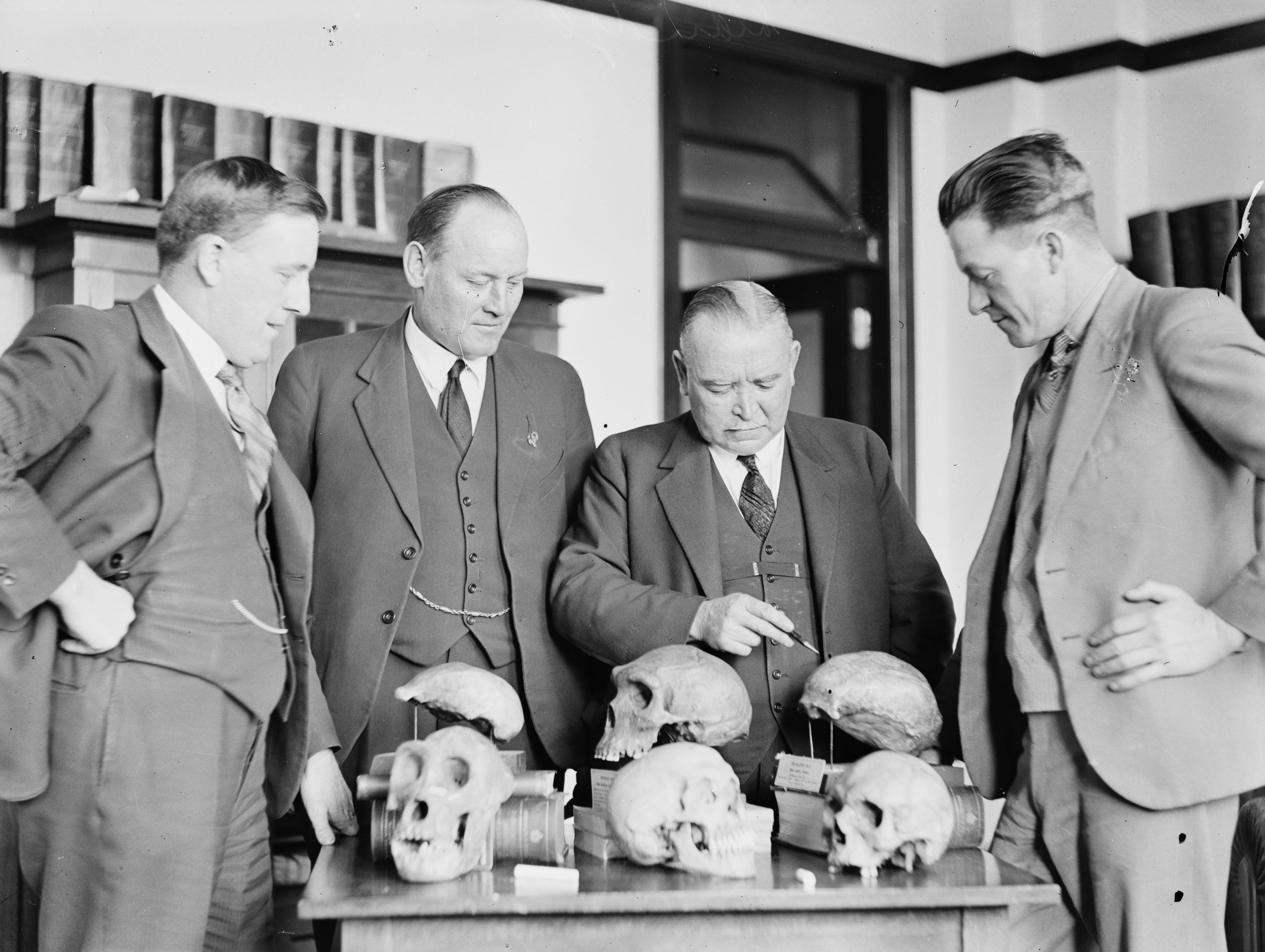
Eldridge showing other Lang Labor MPs his collection of skulls, as part of a series of lectures on the human mind

Eldridge was a co-founder of the Eugenics Education Society of New South Wales (EENSW), an affiliate of the Eugenics Education Society in London, and served as its honorary secretary from 1912 to 1922. His interest in formal eugenics advocacy was apparently spurred by the First International Eugenics Congress in 1912, although he had corresponded with British eugenist Caleb Saleeby for several years.

Eldridge promoted a "nurtural" strand of eugenics, sometimes referred to as euthenics, which emphasised "sociological" factors such as improved living conditions and education alongside the "biological" factors of genetics. His promotional work was atypical of contemporary eugenists in that it focused on the labour movement, which he regarded as indifferent to or suspicious of eugenics. Eldridge became disaffected with the eugenics movement through the disdain of other activists for the universal endowment policies he favoured, with some openly critical of his interest in the "lower classes". After he withdrew from the movement the EENSW fell into abeyance.

== Federal parliament ==
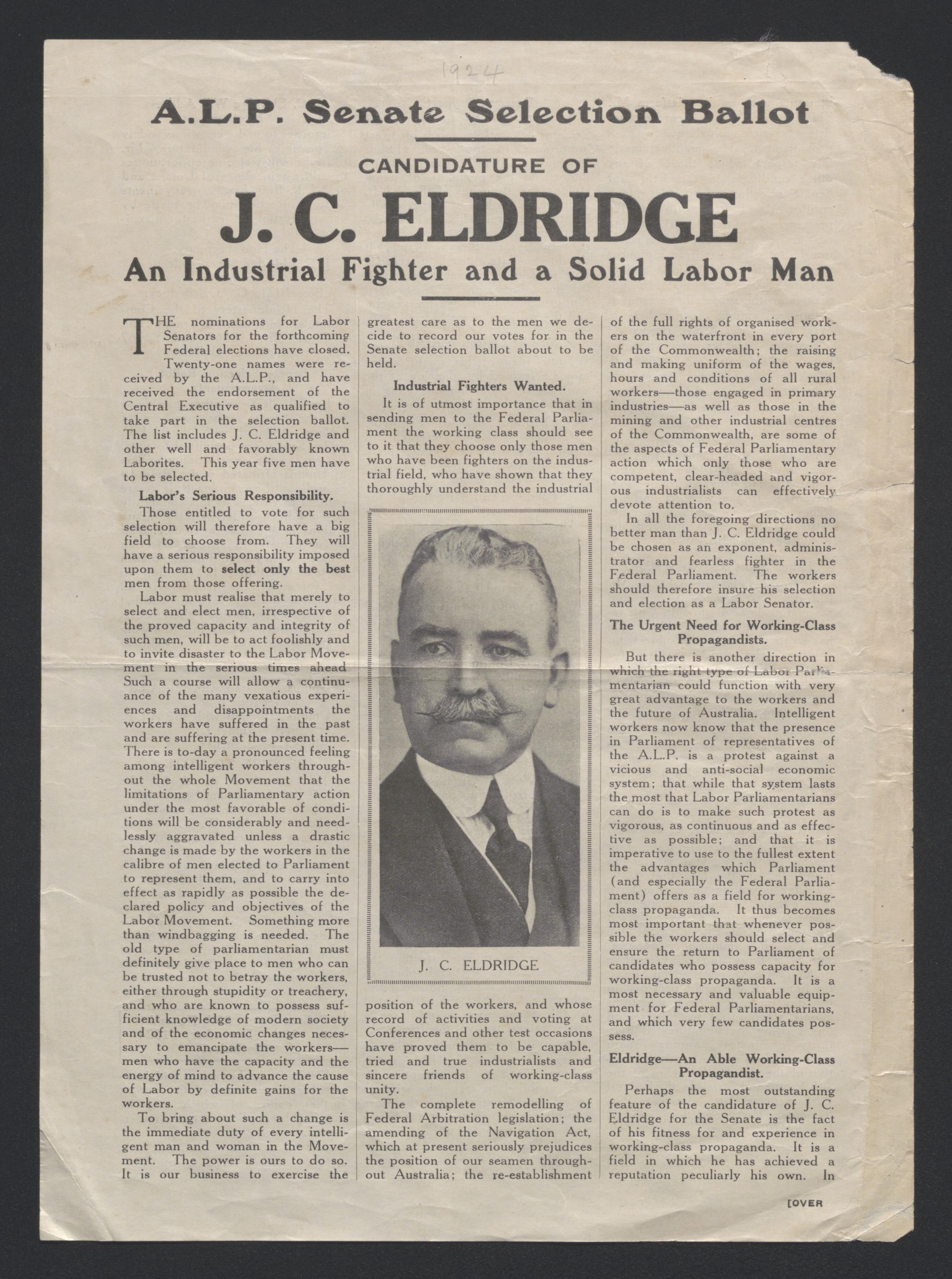
Promotional material used by Eldridge in his 1925 Senate candidacy

An active member of the Labor Party, Eldridge wrote articles for Labor journals across a range of subjects, was an unsuccessful candidate for the Senate at the 1925 federal election and directed the party's radio campaign at the 1929 election.

Eldridge was elected to the House of Representatives at the 1929 federal election, when he unexpectedly won the seat of Martin amidst Labor's large victory that year. Eldridge was a prominent supporter of Premier of New South Wales Jack Lang and his "Lang Plan" for responding to the Great Depression, and was heavily involved in the bitter divisions leading to the Lang section of the 1931 Labor split. As the split progressed, he was seen as the Lang Labor federal deputy leader under Jack Beasley. Given that Martin was thought to be unwinnable for a second term, Eldridge sought to contest Barton, held by official Labor incumbent James Tully at the forthcoming federal election. On 25 November 1931, Eldridge moved for the vote that, when Eldridge and his Lang colleagues voted with the opposition, brought down the Scullin Labor government. Both Eldridge and Tully lost to a United Australia Party candidate at the resulting 1931 election.

== Later activities ==
He was a Commonwealth Arbitration Inspector from August 1940. Eldridge also made a series of unsuccessful attempts to re-enter politics over many years: he contested the state seat of Croydon at the 1932 state election for Lang's State Labor Party, recontested Barton for Lang Labor in 1934, and following Lang Labor's collapse unsuccessfully sought Labor preselection in his old seat of Martin in 1942 and for the Senate in 1945.

== Personal life ==
Eldridge died in 1954 at his daughter's residence in Rockdale, aged 82.

== Sources ==
- Wyndham, Diana (1996). "Four Distinctive Eugenists". Striving For National Fitness: Eugenics in Australia, 1910s to 1930s (PDF) (Ph.D. thesis). University of Sydney.

Parliament of Australia
Preceded by Graham Pratten	Member for Martin; 1929–1931	Succeeded by William Holman
