= Division of Martin =

Former Australian federal electoral division

Martin Australian House of Representatives Division
- Created: 1922
- Abolished: 1955
- Namesake: Sir James Martin

The Division of Martin was an Australian Electoral Division in the state of New South Wales. It was located in the inner western suburbs of Sydney, and initially included the suburbs of Concord and Mortlake, although by the time it was abolished in 1955, it had moved to cover Abbotsford, Balmain and Drummoyne.

The Division was named after Hon Sir James Martin, a former Premier of New South Wales. It was proclaimed at the redistribution of 13 September 1922, and was first contested at the 1922 Federal election. It was abolished at the redistribution of 30 August 1955. The seat was at one stage held by William Holman, a former Premier of New South Wales.

== Members ==
Image	Member	Party	Term	Notes
	Herbert Pratten (1865–1928)	Nationalist	16 December 1922 – 7 May 1928	Previously held the Division of Parramatta. Served as minister under Bruce. Died in office. Nephew was Graham Pratten
	Graham Pratten (1899–1977)	Nationalist	16 June 1928 – 12 October 1929	Lost seat. Later became a member of the New South Wales Legislative Council in 1937. Uncle was Herbert Pratten
	John Eldridge (1872–1954)	Labor	12 October 1929 – 27 March 1931	Did not contest in 1931. Failed to win the Division of Barton
	John Eldridge (1872–1954)	Labor (NSW)	27 March 1931 – 19 December 1931	Did not contest in 1931. Failed to win the Division of Barton
	William Holman (1871–1934)	United Australia	19 December 1931 – 5 June 1934	Previously held the New South Wales Legislative Assembly seat of Cootamundra. Died in office
	William McCall (1908–1968)	United Australia	15 September 1934 – 21 August 1943	Lost seat
	Fred Daly (1912–1995)	Labor	21 August 1943 – 10 December 1949	Transferred to the Division of Grayndler
	William O'Connor (1910–1987)	Labor	10 December 1949 – 10 December 1955	Previously held the Division of West Sydney. Transferred to the Division of Dalley after Martin was abolished in 1955
