= Graham Pratten =

Australian politician

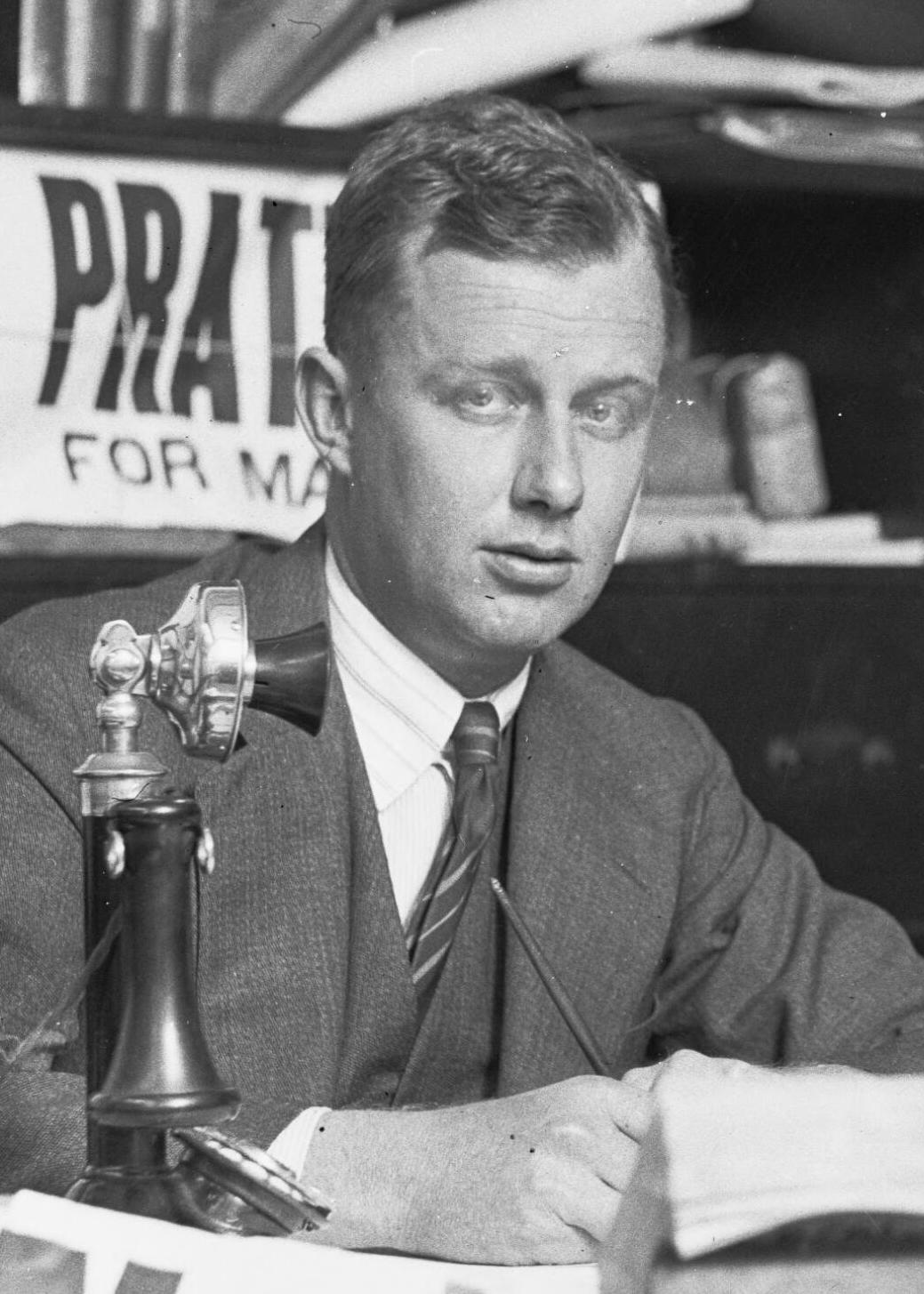
- Pratten in 1929

Member of the Australian Parliament for Martin
- In office 16 June 1928 – 12 October 1929
- Preceded by: Herbert Pratten
- Succeeded by: John Eldridge

Personal details
- Born: 13 December 1899 Sydney
- Died: 18 December 1977 (aged 78)
- Party: Nationalist (1928–31); UAP (1931–45); Liberal (1945–59); Country (1959–76)
- Children: 1, Helen Jill Meredith
- Occupation: Company director
- Profession: Printer

Frederick Graham Pratten (13 December 1899 – 18 December 1977) was an Australian politician. He was a Nationalist Party member of the Australian House of Representatives for Martin from 1928 to 1929 and a member of the New South Wales Legislative Council from 1937 to 1976, successively representing the United Australia Party (1937-1945), Liberal Party (1945-1960) and Country Party (1959-1972).

== Early life and business activities ==
Pratten was born in Leichhardt and was educated at Abbotsholme College, Sydney Church of England Grammar School and the University of Sydney, graduating with a bachelor of science in 1923. He worked in his family's firm, Pratten Bros., and subsequently took over as managing director of the business before he first entered politics. He was a director of the Australian board of London Assurance, the Pan Australia Unit Trust and Wentworth Hotel Limited, and was secretary of the Pymble branch of the Nationalist Party.

In 1923, Pratten and mining engineer James Newman formed Alluvial Tin (Malaya) Ltd, exploring for tin in Perak, British Malaya. They discovered tin-bearing alluvial deposits which they mined via deep-dredging and later expanded their activities to British Borneo, Burma and Siam.

== Federal politics ==
In 1928 his uncle, Herbert Pratten, a Nationalist MP, died, and Frederick was selected by the Nationalists to replace him in the resulting by-election for the seat of Martin, defeating former premier William Holman and Brigadier Herbert Lloyd in Nationalist preselection. He won the by-election, and was returned in the federal election later that year. He was defeated in the elections of 1929.

== State politics ==
Pratten was then elected to the New South Wales Legislative Council in 1937. In December 1938, he made a widely reported speech that demanded that the "inflow of foreign Jews" fleeing Adolf Hitler had to be checked to prevent "a serious problem which will undoubtedly strike at the social, economical and political nature of this State" and argued that the federal government should "ensure more rigid and scientific control of this type of immigrant". In 1959, he was one of three Liberal MPs to defect to the Country Party, giving the Country Party a majority among upper house members of the conservative Coalition; it was reported that the split was due to a disagreement with the Liberal Party over policy on the abolition of the Legislative Council. He served in the Legislative Council until 1976.

Pratten was a director of the Royal Prince Alfred Hospital from 1960 to 1971. He died at Potts Point in 1977.

Parliament of Australia
Preceded by Herbert Pratten	Member for Martin; 1928–1929	Succeeded by John Eldridge
