= List of senators from New South Wales =

New South Wales Australian Senate
- Created: 1901
- Party: Coalition (5) (Note: Liberal (4); National (1)); Labor (4); Greens (2); One Nation (1)

This is a list of senators from the state of New South Wales since the Federation of Australia in 1901.

== List ==
Senate	Election	Senator (Party)	Senator (Party)	Senator (Party)	Senator (Party)	Senator (Party)	Senator (Party)	Senator (Party)	Senator (Party)	Senator (Party)	Senator (Party)	Senator (Party)	Senator (Party)
1901–1903	1901	Albert Gould (Free Trade/ Liberal/ Nationalist)	Edward Millen (Free Trade/ Liberal/ Nationalist)	Edward Pulsford (Free Trade/ Liberal)	James Walker (Free Trade/ Liberal)	John Neild (Free Trade/ Liberal)	Richard O'Connor (Protectionist)	6 senators per state 1901-1950					
1901–1903	1903	Albert Gould (Free Trade/ Liberal/ Nationalist)	Edward Millen (Free Trade/ Liberal/ Nationalist)	Edward Pulsford (Free Trade/ Liberal)	James Walker (Free Trade/ Liberal)	John Neild (Free Trade/ Liberal)	Dr Charles Mackellar (Protectionist)	6 senators per state 1901-1950					
1904–1906	1903	Albert Gould (Free Trade/ Liberal/ Nationalist)	Edward Millen (Free Trade/ Liberal/ Nationalist)	Edward Pulsford (Free Trade/ Liberal)	James Walker (Free Trade/ Liberal)	John Neild (Free Trade/ Liberal)	John Gray (Free Trade/ Liberal)	6 senators per state 1901-1950					
1907–1910	1906	Albert Gould (Free Trade/ Liberal/ Nationalist)	Edward Millen (Free Trade/ Liberal/ Nationalist)	Edward Pulsford (Free Trade/ Liberal)	James Walker (Free Trade/ Liberal)	John Neild (Free Trade/ Liberal)	John Gray (Free Trade/ Liberal)	6 senators per state 1901-1950					
1907–1910	1909	Albert Gould (Free Trade/ Liberal/ Nationalist)	Edward Millen (Free Trade/ Liberal/ Nationalist)	Edward Pulsford (Free Trade/ Liberal)	James Walker (Free Trade/ Liberal)	John Neild (Free Trade/ Liberal)	John Gray (Free Trade/ Liberal)	6 senators per state 1901-1950					
1910–1913	1910	Albert Gould (Free Trade/ Liberal/ Nationalist)	Edward Millen (Free Trade/ Liberal/ Nationalist)	Arthur Rae (Labor)	James Walker (Free Trade/ Liberal)	Albert Gardiner (Labor)	Allan McDougall (Labor)	6 senators per state 1901-1950					
1913–1914	1913	Albert Gould (Free Trade/ Liberal/ Nationalist)	Edward Millen (Free Trade/ Liberal/ Nationalist)	Arthur Rae (Labor)	Charles Oakes (Liberal)	Albert Gardiner (Labor)	Allan McDougall (Labor)	6 senators per state 1901-1950					
1914–1917	1914	Albert Gould (Free Trade/ Liberal/ Nationalist)	Edward Millen (Free Trade/ Liberal/ Nationalist)	David Watson (Labor)	John Grant (Labor)	Albert Gardiner (Labor)	Allan McDougall (Labor)	6 senators per state 1901-1950					
1914–1917	1917	Albert Gould (Free Trade/ Liberal/ Nationalist)	Edward Millen (Free Trade/ Liberal/ Nationalist)	David Watson (Labor)	John Grant (Labor)	Albert Gardiner (Labor)	Allan McDougall (Labor)	6 senators per state 1901-1950					
1917–1920	1917	Herbert Pratten (Nationalist)	Edward Millen (Free Trade/ Liberal/ Nationalist)	Josiah Thomas (Nationalist)	John Grant (Labor)	Albert Gardiner (Labor)	Allan McDougall (Labor)	6 senators per state 1901-1950					
1920–1923	1919	Herbert Pratten (Nationalist)	Edward Millen (Free Trade/ Liberal/ Nationalist)	Josiah Thomas (Nationalist)	Charles Cox (Nationalist/ UAP)	Albert Gardiner (Labor)	Walter Duncan (Nationalist/ Independent/ Australian/ UAP)	6 senators per state 1901-1950					
1920–1923	1921	Henry Garling (Nationalist)	Edward Millen (Free Trade/ Liberal/ Nationalist)	Josiah Thomas (Nationalist)	Charles Cox (Nationalist/ UAP)	Albert Gardiner (Labor)	Walter Duncan (Nationalist/ Independent/ Australian/ UAP)	6 senators per state 1901-1950					
1920–1923	1922	Allan McDougall (Labor)	Edward Millen (Free Trade/ Liberal/ Nationalist)	Josiah Thomas (Nationalist)	Charles Cox (Nationalist/ UAP)	Albert Gardiner (Labor)	Walter Duncan (Nationalist/ Independent/ Australian/ UAP)	6 senators per state 1901-1950					
1923–1926	1922	Allan McDougall (Labor)	Edward Millen (Free Trade/ Liberal/ Nationalist)	John Grant (Labor)	Charles Cox (Nationalist/ UAP)	Albert Gardiner (Labor)	Walter Duncan (Nationalist/ Independent/ Australian/ UAP)	6 senators per state 1901-1950					
1923–1926	1923	Allan McDougall (Labor)	Walter Massy-Greene (Nationalist)	John Grant (Labor)	Charles Cox (Nationalist/ UAP)	Albert Gardiner (Labor)	Walter Duncan (Nationalist/ Independent/ Australian/ UAP)	6 senators per state 1901-1950					
1923–1926	1924	Jack Power (Labor)	Walter Massy-Greene (Nationalist)	John Grant (Labor)	Charles Cox (Nationalist/ UAP)	Albert Gardiner (Labor)	Walter Duncan (Nationalist/ Independent/ Australian/ UAP)	6 senators per state 1901-1950					
1923–1926	April 1925	William Gibbs (Labor)	Walter Massy-Greene (Nationalist)	John Grant (Labor)	Charles Cox (Nationalist/ UAP)	Albert Gardiner (Labor)	Walter Duncan (Nationalist/ Independent/ Australian/ UAP)	6 senators per state 1901-1950					
1923–1926	Nov 1925	Josiah Thomas (Nationalist)	Percy Abbott (Country)	John Grant (Labor)	Charles Cox (Nationalist/ UAP)	Albert Gardiner (Labor)	Walter Duncan (Nationalist/ Independent/ Australian/ UAP)	6 senators per state 1901-1950					
1926–1929	1925	Josiah Thomas (Nationalist)	Percy Abbott (Country)	John Grant (Labor)	Charles Cox (Nationalist/ UAP)	Walter Massy-Greene (Nationalist/ UAP)	Walter Duncan (Nationalist/ Independent/ Australian/ UAP)	6 senators per state 1901-1950					
1926–1929	June 1928	Josiah Thomas (Nationalist)	Percy Abbott (Country)	Albert Gardiner (Independent Labor)	Charles Cox (Nationalist/ UAP)	Walter Massy-Greene (Nationalist/ UAP)	Walter Duncan (Nationalist/ Independent/ Australian/ UAP)	6 senators per state 1901-1950					
1926–1929	Nov 1928	Josiah Thomas (Nationalist)	Percy Abbott (Country)	John Dooley (Labor)	Charles Cox (Nationalist/ UAP)	Walter Massy-Greene (Nationalist/ UAP)	Walter Duncan (Nationalist/ Independent/ Australian/ UAP)	6 senators per state 1901-1950					
1929–1932	1928	Arthur Rae (Labor/ Lang Labor)	James Dunn (Labor/ Lang Labor)	John Dooley (Labor)	Charles Cox (Nationalist/ UAP)	Walter Massy-Greene (Nationalist/ UAP)	Walter Duncan (Nationalist/ Independent/ Australian/ UAP)	6 senators per state 1901-1950					
1929–1932	Aug 1929	Arthur Rae (Labor/ Lang Labor)	James Dunn (Labor/ Lang Labor)	John Dooley (Labor)	Charles Cox (Nationalist/ UAP)	Walter Massy-Greene (Nationalist/ UAP)	Walter Duncan (Nationalist/ Independent/ Australian/ UAP)	6 senators per state 1901-1950					
1929–1932	Dec 1929	Arthur Rae (Labor/ Lang Labor)	James Dunn (Labor/ Lang Labor)	John Dooley (Labor)	Charles Cox (Nationalist/ UAP)	Walter Massy-Greene (Nationalist/ UAP)	Walter Duncan (Nationalist/ Independent/ Australian/ UAP)	6 senators per state 1901-1950					
1929–1932	1931a	Arthur Rae (Labor/ Lang Labor)	James Dunn (Labor/ Lang Labor)	John Dooley (Labor)	Charles Cox (Nationalist/ UAP)	Walter Massy-Greene (Nationalist/ UAP)	Walter Duncan (Nationalist/ Independent/ Australian/ UAP)	6 senators per state 1901-1950					
1929–1932	1931b	Arthur Rae (Labor/ Lang Labor)	James Dunn (Labor/ Lang Labor)	John Dooley (Labor)	Charles Cox (Nationalist/ UAP)	Walter Massy-Greene (Nationalist/ UAP)	Patrick Mooney (Lang Labor)	6 senators per state 1901-1950					
1932–1935	1931	Arthur Rae (Labor/ Lang Labor)	James Dunn (Labor/ Lang Labor)	John Dooley (Labor)	Charles Cox (Nationalist/ UAP)	Walter Massy-Greene (Nationalist/ UAP)	Charles Hardy (Country)	6 senators per state 1901-1950					
1935–1938	1934	Mac Abbott (Country)	Dick Dein (UAP)	Lionel Courtenay (UAP)	Charles Cox (Nationalist/ UAP)	Walter Massy-Greene (Nationalist/ UAP)	Charles Hardy (Country)	6 senators per state 1901-1950					
1935–1938	1935	Mac Abbott (Country)	Dick Dein (UAP)	Guy Arkins (UAP)	Charles Cox (Nationalist/ UAP)	Walter Massy-Greene (Nationalist/ UAP)	Charles Hardy (Country)	6 senators per state 1901-1950					
1935–1938	1937	Mac Abbott (Country)	Dick Dein (UAP)	Bill Ashley (Labor)	Charles Cox (Nationalist/ UAP)	Walter Massy-Greene (Nationalist/ UAP)	Charles Hardy (Country)	6 senators per state 1901-1950					
1938–1941	1937	Mac Abbott (Country)	Dick Dein (UAP)	Bill Ashley (Labor)	Stan Amour (Labor /Labor (Non-Communist) /Labor	John Armstrong (Labor)	Tom Arthur (Labor)	6 senators per state 1901-1950					
1938–1941	1940	Mac Abbott (Country)	Dick Dein (UAP)	Bill Ashley (Labor)	Stan Amour (Labor /Labor (Non-Communist) /Labor	John Armstrong (Labor)	Tom Arthur (Labor)	6 senators per state 1901-1950					
1938–1941	1941	Mac Abbott (Country)	Dick Dein (UAP)	Bill Ashley (Labor)	Stan Amour (Labor /Labor (Non-Communist) /Labor	John Armstrong (Labor)	Tom Arthur (Labor)	6 senators per state 1901-1950					
1941–1944	1940	William Large (Labor)	James Arnold (Labor)	Bill Ashley (Labor)	Stan Amour (Labor /Labor (Non-Communist) /Labor	John Armstrong (Labor)	Tom Arthur (Labor)	6 senators per state 1901-1950					
1944–1947	1943	William Large (Labor)	James Arnold (Labor)	Bill Ashley (Labor)	Stan Amour (Labor /Labor (Non-Communist) /Labor	John Armstrong (Labor)	Donald Grant (Labor)	6 senators per state 1901-1950					
1947–1950	1946	William Large (Labor)	James Arnold (Labor)	Bill Ashley (Labor)	Stan Amour (Labor /Labor (Non-Communist) /Labor	John Armstrong (Labor)	Donald Grant (Labor)	6 senators per state 1901-1950					
1947–1950	1950	William Large (Labor)	James Arnold (Labor)	Bill Ashley (Labor)	Stan Amour (Labor /Labor (Non-Communist) /Labor	John Armstrong (Labor)	Donald Grant (Labor)	Albert Reid (Country)	Bill Spooner (Liberal)	John McCallum (Liberal)	John Tate (Liberal)	10 senators per state 1950-1984	
1950–1951	1949	William Large (Labor)	James Arnold (Labor)	Bill Ashley (Labor)	Stan Amour (Labor /Labor (Non-Communist) /Labor	John Armstrong (Labor)	Donald Grant (Labor)	Albert Reid (Country)	Bill Spooner (Liberal)	John McCallum (Liberal)	John Tate (Liberal)	10 senators per state 1950-1984	
1951–1953	1951	Alister McMullin (Liberal)	James Arnold (Labor)	Bill Ashley (Labor)	Stan Amour (Labor /Labor (Non-Communist) /Labor	John Armstrong (Labor)	Donald Grant (Labor)	Albert Reid (Country)	Bill Spooner (Liberal)	John McCallum (Liberal)	John Tate (Liberal)	10 senators per state 1950-1984	
1953–1956	1953	Alister McMullin (Liberal)	James Arnold (Labor)	Bill Ashley (Labor)	Stan Amour (Labor /Labor (Non-Communist) /Labor	John Armstrong (Labor)	Donald Grant (Labor)	Albert Reid (Country)	Bill Spooner (Liberal)	John McCallum (Liberal)	Ken Anderson (Liberal)	10 senators per state 1950-1984	
1956–1959	1955	Alister McMullin (Liberal)	James Arnold (Labor)	Bill Ashley (Labor)	Stan Amour (Labor /Labor (Non-Communist) /Labor	John Armstrong (Labor)	Donald Grant (Labor)	Albert Reid (Country)	Bill Spooner (Liberal)	John McCallum (Liberal)	Ken Anderson (Liberal)	10 senators per state 1950-1984	
1956–1959	July 1958	Alister McMullin (Liberal)	James Arnold (Labor)	James Ormonde (Labor)	Stan Amour (Labor /Labor (Non-Communist) /Labor	John Armstrong (Labor)	Donald Grant (Labor)	Albert Reid (Country)	Bill Spooner (Liberal)	John McCallum (Liberal)	Ken Anderson (Liberal)	10 senators per state 1950-1984	
1956–1959	Nov 1958	Alister McMullin (Liberal)	James Arnold (Labor)	Colin McKellar (Country)	Stan Amour (Labor /Labor (Non-Communist) /Labor	John Armstrong (Labor)	Donald Grant (Labor)	Albert Reid (Country)	Bill Spooner (Liberal)	John McCallum (Liberal)	Ken Anderson (Liberal)	10 senators per state 1950-1984	
1959–1962	1958	Alister McMullin (Liberal)	James Arnold (Labor)	Colin McKellar (Country)	Stan Amour (Labor /Labor (Non-Communist) /Labor	John Armstrong (Labor)	James Ormonde (Labor)	Albert Reid (Country)	Bill Spooner (Liberal)	John McCallum (Liberal)	Ken Anderson (Liberal)	10 senators per state 1950-1984	
1962–1965	1961	Alister McMullin (Liberal)	James Arnold (Labor)	Colin McKellar (Country)	Stan Amour (Labor /Labor (Non-Communist) /Labor	Doug McClelland (Labor)	James Ormonde (Labor)	Joe Fitzgerald (Labor)	Bill Spooner (Liberal)	Lionel Murphy (Labor)	Ken Anderson (Liberal)	10 senators per state 1950-1984	
1965–1968	1964	Alister McMullin (Liberal)	Tony Mulvihill (Labor)	Colin McKellar (Country)	Tom Bull (Country)	Doug McClelland (Labor)	James Ormonde (Labor)	Joe Fitzgerald (Labor)	Bill Spooner (Liberal)	Lionel Murphy (Labor)	Ken Anderson (Liberal)	10 senators per state 1950-1984	
1965–1968	1965	Alister McMullin (Liberal)	Tony Mulvihill (Labor)	Colin McKellar (Country)	Tom Bull (Country)	Doug McClelland (Labor)	James Ormonde (Labor)	Joe Fitzgerald (Labor)	Bob Cotton (Liberal)	Lionel Murphy (Labor)	Ken Anderson (Liberal)	10 senators per state 1950-1984	
1968–1971	1967	Alister McMullin (Liberal)	Tony Mulvihill (Labor)	Colin McKellar (Country)	Tom Bull (Country)	Doug McClelland (Labor)	James Ormonde (Labor)	Joe Fitzgerald (Labor)	Bob Cotton (Liberal)	Lionel Murphy (Labor)	Ken Anderson (Liberal)	10 senators per state 1950-1984	
1968–1971	Aug 1970	Alister McMullin (Liberal)	Tony Mulvihill (Labor)	Douglas Scott (Country)	Tom Bull (Country)	Doug McClelland (Labor)	James Ormonde (Labor)	Joe Fitzgerald (Labor)	Bob Cotton (Liberal)	Lionel Murphy (Labor)	Ken Anderson (Liberal)	10 senators per state 1950-1984	
1968–1971	Nov 1970	Alister McMullin (Liberal)	Tony Mulvihill (Labor)	Jack Kane (DLP)	Tom Bull (Country)	Doug McClelland (Labor)	James Ormonde (Labor)	Joe Fitzgerald (Labor)	Bob Cotton (Liberal)	Lionel Murphy (Labor)	Ken Anderson (Liberal)	10 senators per state 1950-1984	
1968–1971	1971	Alister McMullin (Liberal)	Tony Mulvihill (Labor)	Jack Kane (DLP)	Tom Bull (Country)	Doug McClelland (Labor)	Jim McClelland (Labor)	Joe Fitzgerald (Labor)	Bob Cotton (Liberal)	Lionel Murphy (Labor)	Ken Anderson (Liberal)	10 senators per state 1950-1984	
1971–1974	1970	John Carrick (Liberal)	Tony Mulvihill (Labor)	Jack Kane (DLP)	Arthur Gietzelt (Labor)	Doug McClelland (Labor)	Jim McClelland (Labor)	Joe Fitzgerald (Labor)	Bob Cotton (Liberal)	Lionel Murphy (Labor)	Ken Anderson (Liberal)	10 senators per state 1950-1984	
1974–1975	1974	John Carrick (Liberal)	Tony Mulvihill (Labor)	Douglas Scott (Country)	Arthur Gietzelt (Labor)	Doug McClelland (Labor)	Jim McClelland (Labor)	Peter Baume (Liberal)	Bob Cotton (Liberal)	Lionel Murphy (Labor)	Ken Anderson (Liberal)	10 senators per state 1950-1984	
1974–1975	1975	John Carrick (Liberal)	Tony Mulvihill (Labor)	Douglas Scott (Country)	Arthur Gietzelt (Labor)	Doug McClelland (Labor)	Jim McClelland (Labor)	Peter Baume (Liberal)	Bob Cotton (Liberal)	Cleaver Bunton (Independent)	Ken Anderson (Liberal)	10 senators per state 1950-1984	
1975–1978	1975	John Carrick (Liberal)	Tony Mulvihill (Labor)	Douglas Scott (Country)	Arthur Gietzelt (Labor)	Doug McClelland (Labor)	Jim McClelland (Labor)	Peter Baume (Liberal)	Bob Cotton (Liberal)	Kerry Sibraa (Labor)	Misha Lajovic (Liberal)	10 senators per state 1950-1984	
1978–1981	1977	John Carrick (Liberal)	Tony Mulvihill (Labor)	Douglas Scott (Country)	Arthur Gietzelt (Labor)	Doug McClelland (Labor)	Jim McClelland (Labor)	Peter Baume (Liberal)	Bob Cotton (Liberal)	Colin Mason (Democrat)	Misha Lajovic (Liberal)	10 senators per state 1950-1984	
1978–1981	1978	John Carrick (Liberal)	Tony Mulvihill (Labor)	Douglas Scott (Country)	Arthur Gietzelt (Labor)	Doug McClelland (Labor)	Kerry Sibraa (Labor)	Peter Baume (Liberal)	Chris Puplick (Liberal)	Colin Mason (Democrat)	Misha Lajovic (Liberal)	10 senators per state 1950-1984	
1981–1983	1980	John Carrick (Liberal)	Tony Mulvihill (Labor)	Douglas Scott (Country)	Arthur Gietzelt (Labor)	Doug McClelland (Labor)	Kerry Sibraa (Labor)	Peter Baume (Liberal)	Bruce Childs (Labor)	Colin Mason (Democrat)	Misha Lajovic (Liberal)	10 senators per state 1950-1984	
1983–1985	1983	John Carrick (Liberal)	Graham Richardson (Labor)	Douglas Scott (Country)	Arthur Gietzelt (Labor)	Doug McClelland (Labor)	Kerry Sibraa (Labor)	Peter Baume (Liberal)	Bruce Childs (Labor)	Colin Mason (Democrat)	Misha Lajovic (Liberal)	10 senators per state 1950-1984	
1983–1985	1984	John Carrick (Liberal)	Graham Richardson (Labor)	Douglas Scott (Country)	Arthur Gietzelt (Labor)	Doug McClelland (Labor)	Kerry Sibraa (Labor)	Peter Baume (Liberal)	Bruce Childs (Labor)	Colin Mason (Democrat)	Misha Lajovic (Liberal)	David Brownhill (National)	Chris Puplick (Liberal)
1985–1987	1984	John Carrick (Liberal)	Graham Richardson (Labor)	John Morris (Labor)	Arthur Gietzelt (Labor)	Doug McClelland (Labor)	Kerry Sibraa (Labor)	Peter Baume (Liberal)	Bruce Childs (Labor)	Colin Mason (Democrat)	Michael Baume (Liberal)	David Brownhill (National)	Chris Puplick (Liberal)
1985–1987	1987	John Carrick (Liberal)	Graham Richardson (Labor)	John Morris (Labor)	Arthur Gietzelt (Labor)	Sue West (Labor)	Kerry Sibraa (Labor)	Peter Baume (Liberal)	Bruce Childs (Labor)	Colin Mason (Democrat)	Michael Baume (Liberal)	David Brownhill (National)	Chris Puplick (Liberal)
1987–1990	1987	Bronwyn Bishop (Liberal)	Graham Richardson (Labor)	John Morris (Labor)	Arthur Gietzelt (Labor)	Robert Wood (NDP)	Kerry Sibraa (Labor)	Peter Baume (Liberal)	Bruce Childs (Labor)	Paul McLean (Democrat)	Michael Baume (Liberal)	David Brownhill (National)	Chris Puplick (Liberal)
1987–1990	1988	Bronwyn Bishop (Liberal)	Graham Richardson (Labor)	John Morris (Labor)	Arthur Gietzelt (Labor)	Irina Dunn (Independent)	Kerry Sibraa (Labor)	Peter Baume (Liberal)	Bruce Childs (Labor)	Paul McLean (Democrat)	Michael Baume (Liberal)	David Brownhill (National)	Chris Puplick (Liberal)
1987–1990	1989	Bronwyn Bishop (Liberal)	Graham Richardson (Labor)	John Morris (Labor)	John Faulkner (Labor)	Irina Dunn (Independent)	Kerry Sibraa (Labor)	Peter Baume (Liberal)	Bruce Childs (Labor)	Paul McLean (Democrat)	Michael Baume (Liberal)	David Brownhill (National)	Chris Puplick (Liberal)
1990–1993	1990	Bronwyn Bishop (Liberal)	Graham Richardson (Labor)	Sue West (Labor)	John Faulkner (Labor)	Stephen Loosley (Labor)	Kerry Sibraa (Labor)	Peter Baume (Liberal)	Bruce Childs (Labor)	Paul McLean (Democrat)	Michael Baume (Liberal)	David Brownhill (National)	Vicki Bourne (Democrat)
1990–1993	1991	Bronwyn Bishop (Liberal)	Graham Richardson (Labor)	Sue West (Labor)	John Faulkner (Labor)	Stephen Loosley (Labor)	Kerry Sibraa (Labor)	John Tierney (Liberal)	Bruce Childs (Labor)	Karin Sowada (Democrat)	Michael Baume (Liberal)	David Brownhill (National)	Vicki Bourne (Democrat)
1993–1996	1993	Bronwyn Bishop (Liberal)	Graham Richardson (Labor)	Sue West (Labor)	John Faulkner (Labor)	Stephen Loosley (Labor)	Kerry Sibraa (Labor)	John Tierney (Liberal)	Bruce Childs (Labor)	Sandy Macdonald (National)	Michael Baume (Liberal)	David Brownhill (National)	Vicki Bourne (Democrat)
1993–1996	1994	Bob Woods (Liberal)	Michael Forshaw (Labor)	Sue West (Labor)	John Faulkner (Labor)	Stephen Loosley (Labor)	Belinda Neal (Labor)	John Tierney (Liberal)	Bruce Childs (Labor)	Sandy Macdonald (National)	Michael Baume (Liberal)	David Brownhill (National)	Vicki Bourne (Democrat)
1993–1996	1995	Bob Woods (Liberal)	Michael Forshaw (Labor)	Sue West (Labor)	John Faulkner (Labor)	Tom Wheelwright (Labor)	Belinda Neal (Labor)	John Tierney (Liberal)	Bruce Childs (Labor)	Sandy Macdonald (National)	Michael Baume (Liberal)	David Brownhill (National)	Vicki Bourne (Democrat)
1996–1999	1996	Bob Woods (Liberal)	Michael Forshaw (Labor)	Sue West (Labor)	John Faulkner (Labor)	Helen Coonan (Liberal)	Belinda Neal (Labor)	John Tierney (Liberal)	Bruce Childs (Labor)	Sandy Macdonald (National)	Michael Baume (Liberal)	David Brownhill (National)	Vicki Bourne (Democrat)
1996–1999	1996	Bob Woods (Liberal)	Michael Forshaw (Labor)	Sue West (Labor)	John Faulkner (Labor)	Helen Coonan (Liberal)	Belinda Neal (Labor)	John Tierney (Liberal)	Bruce Childs (Labor)	Sandy Macdonald (National)	Bill Heffernan (Liberal)	David Brownhill (National)	Vicki Bourne (Democrat)
1996–1999	1997	Marise Payne (Liberal)	Michael Forshaw (Labor)	Sue West (Labor)	John Faulkner (Labor)	Helen Coonan (Liberal)	Belinda Neal (Labor)	John Tierney (Liberal)	George Campbell (Labor)	Sandy Macdonald (National)	Bill Heffernan (Liberal)	David Brownhill (National)	Vicki Bourne (Democrat)
1996–1999	1998	Marise Payne (Liberal)	Michael Forshaw (Labor)	Sue West (Labor)	John Faulkner (Labor)	Helen Coonan (Liberal)	Steve Hutchins (Labor)	John Tierney (Liberal)	George Campbell (Labor)	Sandy Macdonald (National)	Bill Heffernan (Liberal)	David Brownhill (National)	Vicki Bourne (Democrat)
1999–2002	1998	Marise Payne (Liberal)	Michael Forshaw (Labor)	Sue West (Labor)	John Faulkner (Labor)	Helen Coonan (Liberal)	Steve Hutchins (Labor)	John Tierney (Liberal)	George Campbell (Labor)	Aden Ridgeway (Democrat)	Bill Heffernan (Liberal)	David Brownhill (National)	Vicki Bourne (Democrat)
1999–2002	2000	Marise Payne (Liberal)	Michael Forshaw (Labor)	Sue West (Labor)	John Faulkner (Labor)	Helen Coonan (Liberal)	Steve Hutchins (Labor)	John Tierney (Liberal)	George Campbell (Labor)	Aden Ridgeway (Democrat)	Bill Heffernan (Liberal)	Sandy Macdonald (National)	Vicki Bourne (Democrat)
2002–2005	2001	Marise Payne (Liberal)	Michael Forshaw (Labor)	Ursula Stephens (Labor)	John Faulkner (Labor)	Helen Coonan (Liberal)	Steve Hutchins (Labor)	John Tierney (Liberal)	George Campbell (Labor)	Aden Ridgeway (Democrat)	Bill Heffernan (Liberal)	Sandy Macdonald (National)	Kerry Nettle (Greens)
2002–2005	2005	Marise Payne (Liberal)	Michael Forshaw (Labor)	Ursula Stephens (Labor)	John Faulkner (Labor)	Helen Coonan (Liberal)	Steve Hutchins (Labor)	Concetta Fierravanti-Wells (Liberal)	George Campbell (Labor)	Aden Ridgeway (Democrat)	Bill Heffernan (Liberal)	Sandy Macdonald (National)	Kerry Nettle (Greens)
2005–2008	2004	Marise Payne (Liberal)	Michael Forshaw (Labor)	Ursula Stephens (Labor)	John Faulkner (Labor)	Helen Coonan (Liberal)	Steve Hutchins (Labor)	Concetta Fierravanti-Wells (Liberal)	George Campbell (Labor)	Fiona Nash (National)	Bill Heffernan (Liberal)	Sandy Macdonald (National)	Kerry Nettle (Greens)
2008–2011	2007	Marise Payne (Liberal)	Michael Forshaw (Labor)	Ursula Stephens (Labor)	John Faulkner (Labor)	Helen Coonan (Liberal)	Steve Hutchins (Labor)	Concetta Fierravanti-Wells (Liberal)	Doug Cameron (Labor)	Fiona Nash (National)	Bill Heffernan (Liberal)	John Williams (National)	Mark Arbib (Labor)
2011–2014	2010	Marise Payne (Liberal)	Matt Thistlethwaite (Labor)	Ursula Stephens (Labor)	John Faulkner (Labor)	Helen Coonan (Liberal)	Lee Rhiannon (Greens)	Concetta Fierravanti-Wells (Liberal)	Doug Cameron (Labor)	Fiona Nash (National)	Bill Heffernan (Liberal)	John Williams (National)	Mark Arbib (Labor)
2011–2014	2011	Marise Payne (Liberal)	Matt Thistlethwaite (Labor)	Ursula Stephens (Labor)	John Faulkner (Labor)	Arthur Sinodinos (Liberal)	Lee Rhiannon (Greens)	Concetta Fierravanti-Wells (Liberal)	Doug Cameron (Labor)	Fiona Nash (National)	Bill Heffernan (Liberal)	John Williams (National)	Mark Arbib (Labor)
2011–2014	2012	Marise Payne (Liberal)	Matt Thistlethwaite (Labor)	Ursula Stephens (Labor)	John Faulkner (Labor)	Arthur Sinodinos (Liberal)	Lee Rhiannon (Greens)	Concetta Fierravanti-Wells (Liberal)	Doug Cameron (Labor)	Fiona Nash (National)	Bill Heffernan (Liberal)	John Williams (National)	Bob Carr (Labor)
2011–2014	2013	Marise Payne (Liberal)	Sam Dastyari (Labor)	Ursula Stephens (Labor)	John Faulkner (Labor)	Arthur Sinodinos (Liberal)	Lee Rhiannon (Greens)	Concetta Fierravanti-Wells (Liberal)	Doug Cameron (Labor)	Fiona Nash (National)	Bill Heffernan (Liberal)	John Williams (National)	Deborah O'Neill (Labor)
2014–2016	2013	Marise Payne (Liberal)	Sam Dastyari (Labor)	David Leyonhjelm (Liberal Democrats)	John Faulkner (Labor)	Arthur Sinodinos (Liberal)	Lee Rhiannon (Greens)	Concetta Fierravanti-Wells (Liberal)	Doug Cameron (Labor)	Fiona Nash (National)	Bill Heffernan (Liberal)	John Williams (National)	Deborah O'Neill (Labor)
2014–2016	2015	Marise Payne (Liberal)	Sam Dastyari (Labor)	David Leyonhjelm (Liberal Democrats)	Jenny McAllister (Labor)	Arthur Sinodinos (Liberal)	Lee Rhiannon (Greens)	Concetta Fierravanti-Wells (Liberal)	Doug Cameron (Labor)	Fiona Nash (National)	Bill Heffernan (Liberal)	John Williams (National)	Deborah O'Neill (Labor)
2016–2019	2016	Marise Payne (Liberal)	Sam Dastyari (Labor)	David Leyonhjelm (Liberal Democrats)	Jenny McAllister (Labor)	Arthur Sinodinos (Liberal)	Lee Rhiannon (Greens)	Concetta Fierravanti-Wells (Liberal)	Doug Cameron (Labor)	Fiona Nash (National)	Brian Burston (One Nation /UAP)	John Williams (National)	Deborah O'Neill (Labor)
2016–2019	2017	Marise Payne (Liberal)	Sam Dastyari (Labor)	David Leyonhjelm (Liberal Democrats)	Jenny McAllister (Labor)	Arthur Sinodinos (Liberal)	Lee Rhiannon (Greens)	Concetta Fierravanti-Wells (Liberal)	Doug Cameron (Labor)	Jim Molan (Liberal)	Brian Burston (One Nation /UAP)	John Williams (National)	Deborah O'Neill (Labor)
2016–2019	2018	Marise Payne (Liberal)	Kristina Keneally (Labor)	David Leyonhjelm (Liberal Democrats)	Jenny McAllister (Labor)	Arthur Sinodinos (Liberal)	Mehreen Faruqi (Greens)	Concetta Fierravanti-Wells (Liberal)	Doug Cameron (Labor)	Jim Molan (Liberal)	Brian Burston (One Nation /UAP)	John Williams (National)	Deborah O'Neill (Labor)
2016–2019	2019	Marise Payne (Liberal)	Kristina Keneally (Labor)	Duncan Spender (Liberal Democrats)	Jenny McAllister (Labor)	Arthur Sinodinos (Liberal)	Mehreen Faruqi (Greens)	Concetta Fierravanti-Wells (Liberal)	Doug Cameron (Labor)	Jim Molan (Liberal)	Brian Burston (One Nation /UAP)	John Williams (National)	Deborah O'Neill (Labor)
2019–2022	2019	Marise Payne (Liberal)	Kristina Keneally (Labor)	Tim Ayres (Labor)	Jenny McAllister (Labor)	Arthur Sinodinos (Liberal)	Mehreen Faruqi (Greens)	Concetta Fierravanti-Wells (Liberal)	Tony Sheldon (Labor)	Andrew Bragg (Liberal)	Hollie Hughes (Liberal)	Perin Davey (National)	Deborah O'Neill (Labor)
2019–2022	2019	Marise Payne (Liberal)	Kristina Keneally (Labor)	Tim Ayres (Labor)	Jenny McAllister (Labor)	Jim Molan (Liberal)	Mehreen Faruqi (Greens)	Concetta Fierravanti-Wells (Liberal)	Tony Sheldon (Labor)	Andrew Bragg (Liberal)	Hollie Hughes (Liberal)	Perin Davey (National)	Deborah O'Neill (Labor)
2022–2025	2022	Marise Payne (Liberal)	David Shoebridge (Greens)	Tim Ayres (Labor)	Jenny McAllister (Labor)	Jim Molan (Liberal)	Mehreen Faruqi (Greens)	Ross Cadell (National)	Tony Sheldon (Labor)	Andrew Bragg (Liberal)	Hollie Hughes (Liberal)	Perin Davey (National)	Deborah O'Neill (Labor)
2022–2025	2023	Dave Sharma (Liberal)	David Shoebridge (Greens)	Tim Ayres (Labor)	Jenny McAllister (Labor)	Maria Kovacic (Liberal)	Mehreen Faruqi (Greens)	Ross Cadell (National)	Tony Sheldon (Labor)	Andrew Bragg (Liberal)	Hollie Hughes (Liberal)	Perin Davey (National)	Deborah O'Neill (Labor)
2025–2028	2025	Dave Sharma (Liberal)	David Shoebridge (Greens)	Tim Ayres (Labor)	Jenny McAllister (Labor)	Maria Kovacic (Liberal)	Mehreen Faruqi (Greens)	Ross Cadell (National)	Tony Sheldon (Labor)	Andrew Bragg (Liberal)	Jessica Collins (Liberal)	Warwick Stacey (One Nation)	Deborah O'Neill (Labor)
2025–2028	2025	Dave Sharma (Liberal)	David Shoebridge (Greens)	Tim Ayres (Labor)	Jenny McAllister (Labor)	Maria Kovacic (Liberal)	Mehreen Faruqi (Greens)	Ross Cadell (National)	Tony Sheldon (Labor)	Andrew Bragg (Liberal)	Jessica Collins (Liberal)	Sean Bell (One Nation)	Deborah O'Neill (Labor)

== See also ==
- Electoral results for the Australian Senate in New South Wales
