= Members of the Australian Senate, 1923–1926 =

Senate composition at 1 July 1923
Government (25) - (7 seat majority)
Nationalist (24)
FSA/Country Party (1)

Opposition (11)
Labor (11) (Note: At the November 1925 election Labor senator Joseph Hannan was defeated for a casual vacancy by Country Party candidate David Andrew.) (Note: Labor senator William Gibbs did not stand for election at the November 1925 election and the casual vacancy was won by Nationalist Josiah Thomas.) (Note: Labor Senator James O'Loghlin died in December 1925 and was replaced by Nationalist Henry Barwell.)

Changes in composition

This is a list of members of the Australian Senate from 1923 to 1926. Half of its members were elected at the 13 December 1919 election and had terms starting on 1 July 1920 and finishing on 30 June 1926; the other half were elected at the 16 December 1922 election and had terms starting on 1 July 1923 and finishing on 30 June 1929.

This period was marked by the number of casual vacancies and the filling of these vacancies was complex. While senators were elected for a six-year term, people appointed to a casual vacancy only held office until the earlier of the next election for the House of Representatives or the Senate. Because the 1925 election was a half senate election, each state would ordinarily elect 3 senators. NSW however had 2 additional vacancies as a result of the death of 2 senators with terms ending in 1929. The first three elected, Cox, Duncan and Massy-Greene won the full term from 1 July 1926 to 30 June 1932, while the next two elected Abbott and Thomas won the long vacancies finishing on 30 June 1929. Massy-Greene who had been appointed to fill one of the vacancies in 1923 ceased to be a senator between 14 November 1925 and the start of his new term on 1 July 1926. Victoria had 1 additional vacancy, a short vacancy with the term ending in 1926. Plain was the third senator elected and thus won both the short vacancy ending on 30 June 1926 and the full term from 1 July 1926 to 30 June 1932.

Senator	Party	State	Term ending	Years in office
Percy Abbott (Note: Nationalist senator Edward Millen died on 14 September 1923; Nationalist Walter Massy-Greene was appointed on 18 December to replace him until the 14 November 1925 election. Massy-Greene won the third vacancy for the term from 1 July 1926 to 30 June 1932 while Percy Abbott was elected to fill the fifth vacancy, being the remainder of Millen's term finishing in 1929.)	Nationalist	New South Wales	1929	1925–1929
David Andrew (Note: Labor senator Stephen Barker died on 21 June 1924; on 18 December Labor Joseph Hannan was appointed to replace him until the 14 November 1925 election, when he was defeated by Country Party candidate David Andrew for the remainder of the term finishing on 30 June 1929.)	Country	Victoria	1929	1925–1928
Thomas Bakhap (Note: Nationalist senator Thomas Bakhap died on 18 August 1923; on 18 December Nationalist Herbert Hays was appointed to replace him until the 14 November 1925 election, when he was re-elected to a term finishing on 30 June 1929.)	Nationalist	Tasmania	1929	1913–1923
Stephen Barker	Labor	Victoria	1929	1910–1920, 1923–1924
John Barnes	Labor	Victoria	1929	1913–1920, 1923–1935
Henry Barwell (Note: Labor Senator James O'Loghlin died on 4 December 1925; Nationalist Henry Barwell was appointed to replace him on 18 December. Barwell resigned on 22 March 1928 to become South Australian Agent-General to London; Nationalist Albert Robinson was appointed on 18 April to replace him until the November 1928 election. Robinson did not stand for re-election in 1928 and the vacancy was won by Labor candidate Mick O'Halloran.)	Nationalist	South Australia	1928 (Note: Appointed to a casual vacancy and only held office until the earlier of the next election for the House of Representatives or the Senate.)	1925–1928
Benjamin Benny (Note: Nationalist Senator Benjamin Benny resigned on 26 January 1926; Nationalist Alexander McLachlan was appointed to replace him on 24 February.)	Nationalist	South Australia	1926	1920–1926
Charles Cox	Nationalist	New South Wales	1926	1920–1938
Thomas Crawford	Nationalist	Queensland	1929	1917–1947
Edmund Drake-Brockman	Nationalist	Western Australia	1926	1920–1926
Walter Duncan	Nationalist	New South Wales	1926	1920–1931
Harold Elliott	Nationalist	Victoria	1926	1920–1931
Edward Findley	Labor	Victoria	1929	1904–1917, 1923–1929
Harry Foll	Nationalist	Queensland	1929	1917–1947
George Foster (Note: Nationalist senator George Foster resigned on 30 June 1925; Nationalist Charles Grant was appointed on 29 July to replace him until the 14 November 1925 election, when he lost the seat to fellow Nationalist Burford Sampson.)	Nationalist	Tasmania	1926	1920–1925
Albert Gardiner	Labor	New South Wales	1926	1910–1926, 1928
William Gibbs (Note: Labor senator Allan McDougall died on 14 October 1924; Labor Jack Power was appointed on 20 November to replace him, but he died on 13 January 1925. William Gibbs was appointed on 1 April 1925 to replace him until the 14 November 1925 election, when he retired from politics. Josiah Thomas was elected to fill the fourth vacancy, being the remainder of McDougall's term finishing in 1929.)	Labor	New South Wales	1925	1925
Thomas Givens	Nationalist	Queensland	1926	1904–1928
William Glasgow	Nationalist	Queensland	1926	1920–1932
Charles Graham	Labor	Western Australia	1929	1923–1929
Charles Grant	Nationalist	Tasmania	1925	1925, 1932–1941
John Grant	Labor	New South Wales	1929	1914–1920, 1923–1928
James Guthrie	Nationalist	Victoria	1926	1920–1938
Joseph Hannan	Labor	Victoria	1925	1924–1925
John Hayes	Nationalist	Tasmania	1929	1923–1947
Herbert Hays	Nationalist	Tasmania	1925, 1929	1923–1947
Bert Hoare	Labor	South Australia	1929	1922–1935
Walter Kingsmill	Nationalist	Western Australia	1929	1923–1935
Patrick Lynch	Nationalist	Western Australia	1926	1907–1938
Walter Massy-Greene	Nationalist	New South Wales	1925, 1932	1923–1925, 1926–1938
Allan McDougall	Labor	New South Wales	1929	1910–1920, 1922–1924
Charles McHugh	Labor	South Australia	1929	1923–1927
Alexander McLachlan	Nationalist	South Australia	1926	1926–1944
Edward Millen	Nationalist	New South Wales	1929	1901–1923
John Millen	Nationalist	Tasmania	1926	1920–1938
Ted Needham	Labor	Western Australia	1929	1907–1920, 1923–1929
John Newlands	Nationalist	South Australia	1926	1913–1932
James Ogden	Nationalist	Tasmania	1929	1923–1932
James O'Loghlin	Labor	South Australia	1929	~~1907~~, 1913–1920, 1923–1925
Herbert Payne	Nationalist	Tasmania	1926	1920–1938
George Pearce (Note: Father of the Senate)	Nationalist	Western Australia	1926	1901–1938
William Plain (Note: Nationalist senator Edward Russell died on 18 July 1925; Nationalist William Plain was appointed on 25 August to replace him until the 14 November 1925 election, when he was re-elected for a term finishing on 30 June 1932.)	Nationalist	Victoria	1925, 1932	1917–1923, 1925–1938
Jack Power	Labor	New South Wales	1925	1924–1925
Matthew Reid	Nationalist	Queensland	1929	1917–1935
Edward Russell	Nationalist	Victoria	1926	1907–1925
Burford Sampson	Nationalist	Tasmania	1926	1925–1938, 1941–1947
Josiah Thomas	Nationalist	New South Wales	1929	1917–1923, 1925–1929
William Thompson	Nationalist	Queensland	1926	1922–1932
Victor Wilson	FSA/Country	South Australia	1926	1920–1926
