= List of mayors of Paddington (New South Wales) =

People who served as the mayor of the Municipality of Paddington are:

Years	Chairman	Notes
June 1860 – 12 February 1861	William Perry	
12 February 1861 – 14 February 1862	John Carlisle Humphrey	
14 February 1862 – 13 February 1863	Thomas Alston	
13 February 1863 – February 1864	John Carlisle Humphrey	
February 1864 – 20 February 1865	Charles Artlett	
20 February 1865 – 20 February 1866	William Taylor	
20 February 1866 – 19 February 1867	Robert Iredale	
19 February 1867 – 17 February 1868	Charles Artlett	
Years	Mayor	Notes
17 February 1868 – February 1870	William Taylor	
February 1870 – 25 February 1871	John Carlisle Humphrey	
25 February 1871 – February 1872	Robert Campbell	
February 1872 – 10 February 1873	Fergus Maclean	
10 February 1873 – March 1874	Hosea Bennett	
March 1874 – 11 February 1876	John Reddy	
11 February 1876 – 12 February 1878	James Oatley	
12 February 1878 – 14 February 1879	Charles Campbell	
14 February 1879 – 12 February 1881	William Taylor	
12 February 1881 – 17 February 1883	William Brown	
17 February 1883 – 16 February 1884	Emanuel Watson	
16 February 1884 – 14 February 1885	Charles Campbell	
14 February 1885 – 12 February 1886	John Percy McGuanne	
12 February 1886 – 11 February 1887	Charles Hellmrich	
11 February 1887 – 17 February 1888	Charles Campbell	
17 February 1888 – 12 February 1891	Charles Hellmrich	
12 February 1891 – February 1892	Dugald McIntyre	
February 1892 – 16 February 1893	John White	
16 February 1893 – 16 February 1894	James Dillon	
16 February 1894 – 19 February 1895	Tom George	
19 February 1895 – 11 February 1896	George Parker Jones	
11 February 1896 – 12 February 1897	Arthur Walker	
12 February 1897 – 24 February 1900	Thomas John West	
24 February 1900 – 15 February 1901	Albert Pointing	
15 February 1901 – 14 February 1902	Robert William Usher	
14 February 1902 – 14 February 1903	George Walker	
14 February 1903 – 17 February 1905	William Harris Howard	
17 February 1905 – February 1908	Denis Brown	
February 1908 – 2 February 1909	George Walker	
2 February 1909 – 6 February 1911	Francis Meacle	
6 February 1911 – 10 February 1913	Albert Pointing	
10 February 1913 – 4 February 1915	Michael Kerrigan	
4 February 1915 – February 1916	Francis Meacle	
February 1916 – 12 September 1916	James William Gosbell	
12 September 1916 – February 1917	John Thomas Percival Marsh	
February 1917 – 12 February 1918	Michael Purcell	
12 February 1918 – February 1919	Jack Power (ALP)	
February 1919 – February 1920	Michael Purcell	
February 1920 – December 1921	Frank Green (ALP)	
December 1921 – December 1923	Michael Purcell	
December 1923 – December 1924	Albert Gahan	
December 1924 – December 1926	Harold Falvey (ALP)	
December 1926 – December 1927	Maurice O'Sullivan (ALP)	
December 1927 – December 1928	Henry Dickinson	
December 1928 – December 1929	William Bates	
December 1929 – December 1930	Nicholas Connolly	
December 1930 – December 1931	Michael Purcell	
December 1931 – December 1932	Henry Jones	
December 1932 – October 1933	Robert Stapleton	
October 1933 – December 1934	Morris Curotta	
December 1934 – December 1935	William Bates	
December 1935 – December 1936	Thomas Joseph Whelan	
December 1936 – December 1937	Richard Herbert Graydon	
December 1937 – December 1938	John Thomas Whelan	
December 1938 – December 1940	William Fandlan (ALP)	
December 1940 – December 1941	Roger Bede Hill	
December 1941 – December 1942	Walter Farley Read (ALP)	
December 1942 – December 1943	Joseph Carr	
December 1943 – December 1944	Edward Cutler	
December 1944 – December 1946	Frank Green (ALP)	
December 1946 – 31 December 1948	Walter Farley Read (ALP)	
