= Arthur Rae =

New Zealand-born Australian politician

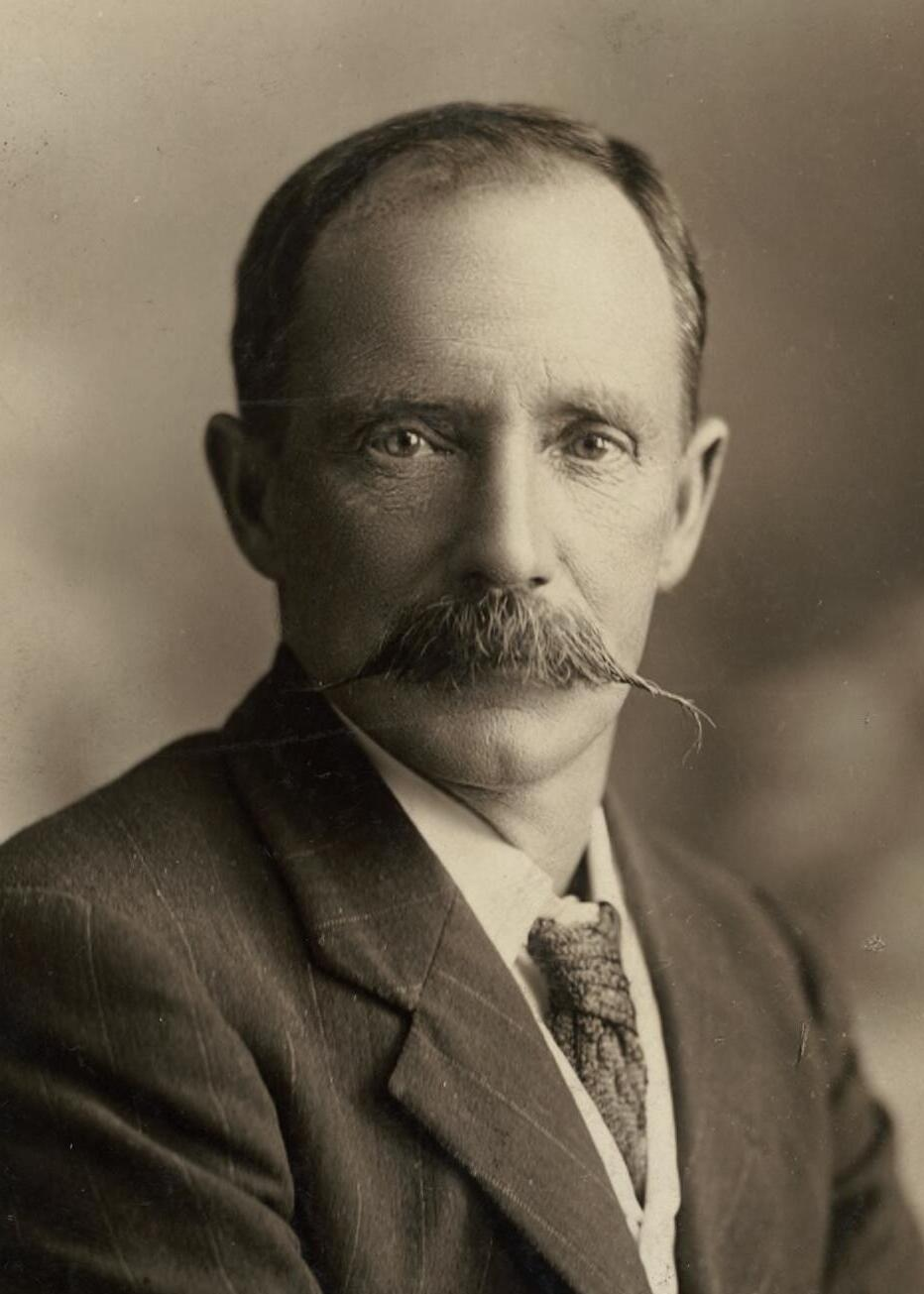

Senator for New South Wales
- In office 1 July 1929 – 30 June 1935
- In office 1 July 1910 – 5 September 1914

Member of the New South Wales Legislative Assembly
- In office 29 June 1891 – 25 June 1894
- Preceded by: David Copland
- Succeeded by: Thomas Fitzpatrick
- Constituency: The Murrumbidgee

Personal details
- Born: 14 March 1860 Christchurch, New Zealand
- Died: 25 November 1943 (aged 83) Liverpool, New South Wales, Australia
- Party: Labor (1891–1919); Socialist Labor (1919–1922); Labor (from 1927)
- Other political affiliations: Lang Labor
- Spouse: Annie Fryer (m. 1892; died 1929)
- Relations: Charles Rae (father)
- Occupation: Shearer, journalist

Arthur Edward George Rae (14 March 1860 – 25 November 1943) was a New Zealand-born Australian trade unionist and politician. He was an influential figure in the early history of the labour movement and Australian Labor Party (ALP), including as a member of the colonial New South Wales Legislative Assembly (1891–1894) and as a Senator for New South Wales (1910–1914, 1929–1935).

Rae was born in Christchurch, New Zealand, and was educated at Blenheim. He worked as a labourer and shearer after leaving school, joining the Amalgamated Shearers' Union of Australasia. After moving to Australia in 1889 he became a union organiser in the Riverina and was briefly imprisoned for his activities. He was elected to parliament at the 1891 New South Wales general election as one of the first Labor MPs, attracting attention for his socialist views. Defeated after a single term, Rae subsequently helped establish the Australian Workers' Union (AWU) and the labour newspaper The Australian Worker. He served terms as president and general secretary of the AWU and was a long-serving member of the ALP state executive.

Rae was elected to the Senate at the 1910 federal election as one of the first three ALP senators in New South Wales. He was defeated in 1914 but continued to play a major role in the ALP as a leader of its anti-conscription faction during the 1916 party split. Rae allied himself with the One Big Union and helped establish the Industrial Socialist Labor Party in 1919, leaving the AWU and ALP. He later became associated with Jack Lang and was readmitted to the ALP in 1927. He was re-elected to the Senate in 1929 and sat as a Lang Labor senator after the 1931 party split, losing his seat again at the 1934 election.

== Early life ==
Rae was born on 14 March 1860 in Christchurch, New Zealand. He was the son of Ann Elizabeth (née Beldan) and Charles Joseph Rae. His father, a painter and glazier by profession, later became a trade union official and was a leader of a major railway strike in 1890.

Rae attended the public school at Blenheim. He left school at the age of 16 and worked as a farm and station hand and as a shearer. He also had some training as a mechanic and was a member of New Zealand's voluntary military force. He joined the New Zealand division of the Amalgamated Shearers' Union of Australasia (ASU) in 1886.

== Labour movement ==
=== Early years ===
In 1889, Rae moved to the colony of Victoria where he worked as a railway labourer and ringbarker in the Gippsland region. He continued his shearing work and became a paid organiser for the ASU, working with its branches in Creswick, Victoria, and Wagga Wagga, New South Wales. By 1890 he was secretary of the ASU's branch in Hay, New South Wales, organising shearers in the Riverina. During the 1890 Australian maritime dispute, Rae led a solidarity strike of Riverina shearers and was convicted of offences under the Masters and Servants Act 1857. He refused to pay the fines levied and was then sentenced to 2½ years' imprisonment. He ultimately served one month at Hay Gaol before being released by the colonial government under public pressure.

Rae was one of the founders of The Hummer in 1891, a Wagga Wagga-based newspaper that evolved into The Australian Worker. He served as president of the General Labourers' Union from 1893 to 1894 and was involved in the creation of the Australian Workers' Union (AWU). He had a long-standing involvement with the AWU, serving as president in 1895 and as general secretary from 1898 to 1899.

=== One Big Union ===
During World War I, Rae emerged as a supporter of the "One Big Union" (OBU) concept, which sought the creation of a single universal trade union organised along industrial lines. The AWU endorsed the OBU principle in 1916, although it was opposed by the Labor Council of New South Wales and other smaller unions concerned about an AWU takeover. In 1918, a union congress in Sydney endorsed the creation of the Workers Industrial Union of Australia (WIUA) as the vehicle for the OBU scheme, which the AWU now opposed as a takeover bid by militants associated with Jock Garden.

Rae was one of the few AWU leaders to continue supporting the WIUA after the AWU formally withdrew support in April 1919. He walked out of the 1919 ALP state conference to protest its failure to support the WIUA. Later in the year, the AWU adopted a pledge requiring its members to disavow any organisation "opposed to the policy of the AWU". Rae refused to sign the pledge and at the 1920 AWU annual convention its president Arthur Blakeley ruled that he would "automatically cease to be an officer of the AWU", despite his life membership.

=== Pastoral Workers' Industrial Union ===
In the early 1920s, Rae began writing for Common Cause, the official newspaper of the Miners' Federation of Australia, using his articles to "white-ant" the AWU. In 1925 he helped establish the Bushwhackers Propaganda Group, a faction of pastoral workers within the AWU that sought "a greater voice for the rank and file in operational and policy-making areas of the union". The AWU annual convention responded by declaring the group to be "a bogus body, and inimical to the working-class movement". Rae continued to agitate on behalf of pastoral workers and in 1930 became the inaugural president of the breakaway Pastoral Workers' Industrial Union. At its inaugural meeting he "emphasised the class character of the new union and its fight against arbitration and the anti working class policy of the AWU officials". He helped organise a major shearers' strike in Queensland in 1931, in protest against wage reductions during the Great Depression.

== Electoral politics ==
=== Colonial politics and early candidacies ===
Rae was elected to the New South Wales Legislative Assembly at the 1891 general election, as one of three members for The Murrumbidgee. He was one of the first MPs elected by the Labor Electoral League, the predecessor of the modern Australian Labor Party (ALP).

In the Legislative Assembly, Rae attracted attention for his advocacy of state socialism, universal adult suffrage, and republicanism, including speaking against a condolence motion for Queen Victoria's grandson Prince Albert Victor, Duke of Clarence and Avondale. He was also active in the temperance movement and supported land reform, including a Georgist-style land tax and conversion of freehold tenure to leasehold. He spoke in favour of William Lane's "New Australia" scheme, which saw the establishment of a utopian socialist colony in Paraguay.

Rae lost his seat by five votes at the 1894 election and made unsuccessful attempts to reclaim it at the 1895 and 1898 elections. He was elected to the first executive of the Political Labor League in 1895, on which he remained for over 20 years. Following Federation in 1901 he also unsuccessfully stood for the House of Representatives at the 1903 federal election, running in Hunter, and for the Legislative Assembly seat of Parramatta at the 1907 state election.

=== Senate, 1910–1914 ===
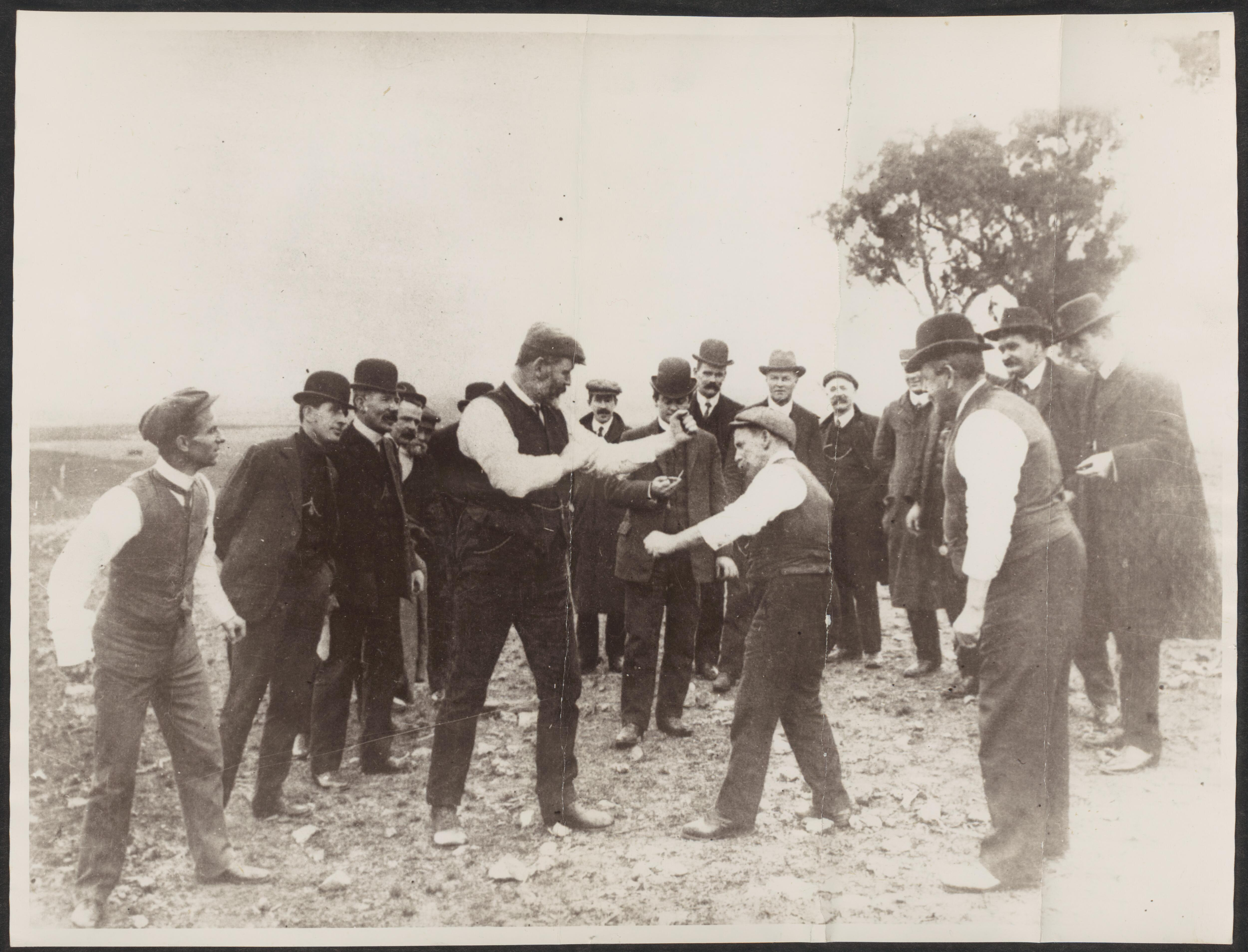
Mock fisticuffs between Rae (right) and his ALP colleague James Long to settle a dispute over the location of the new national capital, Canberra

Rae was elected to a six-year Senate term at the 1910 federal election, commencing on 1 July 1910. He was one of the first three ALP senators elected from New South Wales, along with Albert Gardiner and Allan McDougall.

Rae's maiden speech in the Senate "challenged those around him, and particularly his Labor colleagues, to embrace the coming of socialism, and his ideological predilections continued to inform his views on virtually every matter under debate". He opposed the Fisher government's increased spending on defence and spoke publicly against war and militarism. In 1912, Rae became the first person to be suspended from the Senate, after refusing to withdraw a statement accusing opposition senator Edward Millen of lying.

In 1910, Rae introduced a resolution into the Senate calling on the British parliament to enact women's suffrage, which by then had been granted in all Australian jurisdictions. His resolution passed both the Senate and the House and was forwarded to London during debate on the Conciliation Bills; he also sent copies of the parliamentary debate to prominent overseas suffragists. Rae had a long-standing interest in women's rights, dating back to the 1890s when he developed a friendship with Rose Scott. He advocated for women's suffrage within the labour movement and greater women's involvement within the movement in general, as part of "a minority of socialists at that time who saw the unionisation of women workers, not just as a means of obtaining wage justice, but as a vehicle for the establishment of an independent women's movement".

Rae's term in the Senate was cut short by a double dissolution in 1914 and he was defeated at the resulting 1914 election, with his term ending on 5 September 1914. While there were no fixed positions on the ALP's Senate ticket in New South Wales, he was not given a high prominence in election materials. R. J. Cassidy attributed his defeat to "the lamentable ignorance of the younger generation of Labor voters", while it has also been suggested that his anti-war views cost him votes only months after the outbreak of World War I.

=== Splits, expulsion and reconciliation ===
Rae was a prominent opponent of conscription during World War I, particularly the attempts of ALP prime minister Billy Hughes to require conscripts to serve overseas. He successfully moved an anti-conscription motion at the 1916 ALP state conference. The debate over conscription precipitated a major split in the party which saw Hughes and his supporters establish a new pro-conscription National Labor Party and ultimately merge with the Liberal Party to form a new Nationalist government. Rae was the secretary and spokesman for the No-Conscription Campaign during the 1916 plebiscite and the following year was prosecuted under the War Precautions Act 1914 for making misleading statements, although he was not convicted. He unsuccessfully stood for re-election to the Senate at the 1917 federal election.

In 1918, Rae was appointed acting state secretary of the ALP in New South Wales and became the founding editor of The Labor News. However, the following year he joined militant union leader Albert Willis and other radical socialists in forming a new Industrial Socialist Labor Party (ISLP). He was chosen as the party's inaugural secretary in August 1919, with Willis as president. Rae stated the following year that the "present political methods of the ALP were misleading and would do nothing to emancipate workers from wage slavery". He made a single unsuccessful candidacy for the new party, standing for the Senate at the 1922 election.

Rae's defection meant he was "dismissed as editor of Labor News, vilified in the Labor press, and expelled from the AWU of which he had been made a life member". When the ISLP failed to gain traction, he and Willis began to ally themselves with Jack Lang, who had been elected state leader of the ALP in 1923 but did not fully consolidate power for several more years. With Lang's support, he was ultimately readmitted to the ALP in 1927 "with full continuity of membership".

=== Senate, 1929–1935 ===
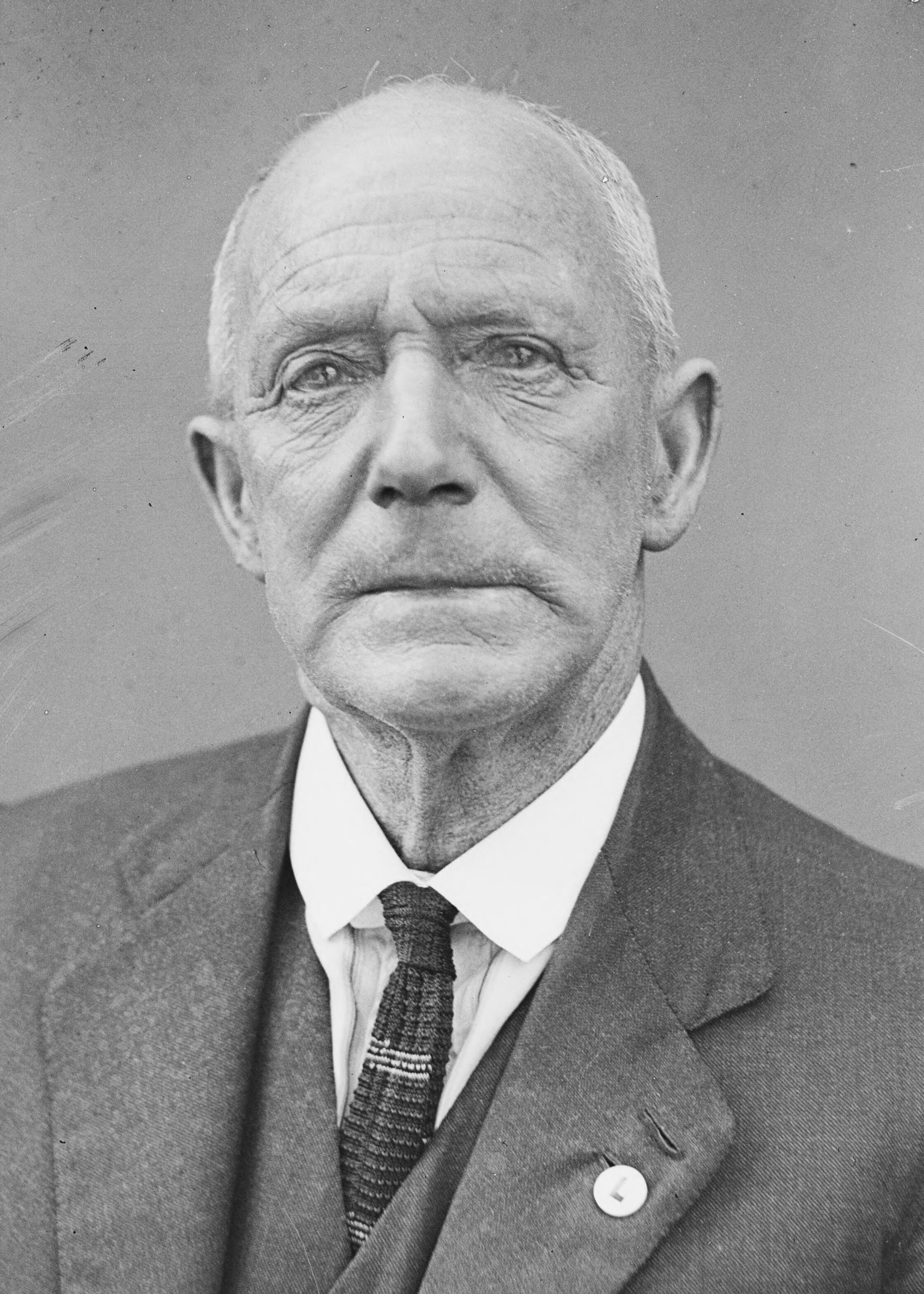
Rae in 1928

In 1928, Rae was chosen as the ALP's official nominee for the casual vacancy caused by the death of Senator John Grant. However, the Parliament of New South Wales ultimately elected Rae's former colleague Albert Gardiner as Grant's replacement, with Nationalist MPs combining with Rae's factional opponents.

Rae was re-elected to the Senate at the 1928 federal election, following a lengthy ALP preselection process that spanned multiple ballots. He was elected to a six-year term commencing on 1 July 1929. After the Labor split of 1931, Rae joined the Lang Labor group, but was defeated as a Lang Labor candidate in 1934.

In 1934, Rae was leader of protests against the Lyons government's attempts to exclude Czech socialist writer Egon Kisch from Australia. He was threatened with arrest when he attempted to board Kisch's ship, but was ultimately allowed to proceed by police.

== Personal life ==
Rae married Annie Fryer in New Zealand in 1892. The couple had eight children, one of whom was adopted. Three of sons served with the Australian Imperial Force (AIF) during World War I, with William killed in action in August 1918 and Donald dying while on active duty in January 1919.

Outside of his political activities, Rae took up a selection near Coolamon, New South Wales, where he farmed wheat. He later bought a fruitgrowing property at Glenorie on the outskirts of Sydney in 1901, before retiring to Marrickville in 1918. He was widowed in 1929 and died at Liverpool Hospital on 25 November 1943, aged 83. He was interred at Rookwood Cemetery.

== Sources ==
- Knowles, Harry (2004). "Arthur Rae: A 'Napoleon' in Exile". Labour History. 87 (87). Liverpool University Press: 103–121. doi:10.2307/27516001. JSTOR 27516001.

New South Wales Legislative Assembly
Preceded by David Copland	Member for Murrumbidgee; 1891–1894; Served alongside: Dibbs, Gormly	Succeeded by Thomas Fitzpatrick
