= Charles Rae =

New Zealand painter and journalist

Charles Joseph Rae (1819 – 7 February 1894) was a New Zealand painter, journalist and labour reformer. He was born in London, England in about 1819. He was the initial promoter of the Christchurch Mechanics' Institute, out of which the Christchurch City Libraries have developed. One of his sons, Arthur Rae, became a Senator for New South Wales.
