= The Labor News =

Australian newspaper

The Labor News was a weekly English-language broadsheet newspaper published in Sydney, Australia. It was later absorbed by the Labor Daily newspaper.

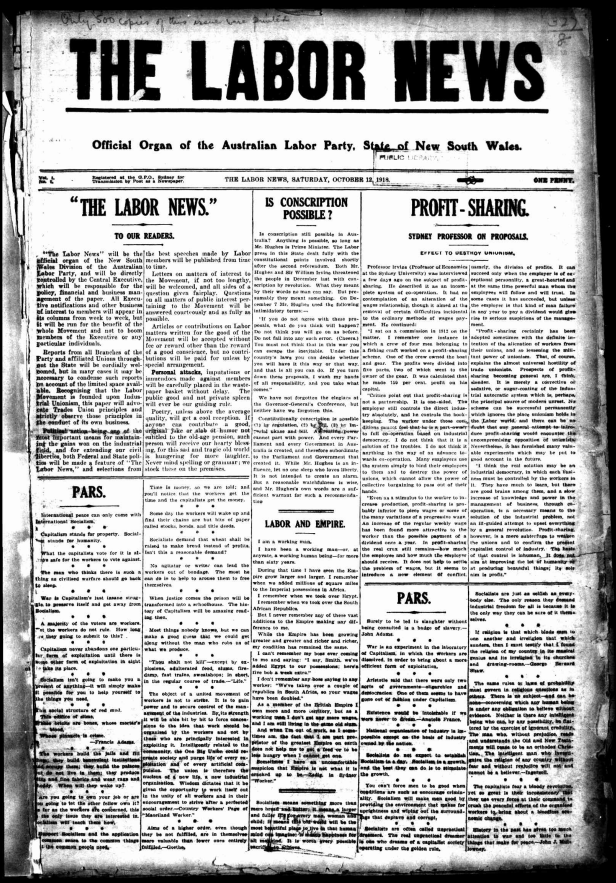
The Labor News 12 October 1918

== History ==
First published in 1918 on behalf of the N.S.W. branch of the Australian Labor Party by the Worker Trustees, The Labor News commenced publication on 12 October 1918, with issue No. 1 of Volume 1, and continued to be published under that title until 26 January 1924. Its founding editor was former senator Arthur Rae, who was the party's acting state secretary at the time. William Gibbs was editor from 1922 to 1923.

The last issue of the paper appeared on 26 January 1924, and contained on page 7 a notice proclaiming "The Labor Daily arrives – The Labor News passes", which also stated that the paper "...willingly ... joins up with its big successor ... and whole-heartedly throws its weight into the effort that is going to make our Daily Sydney's leading newspaper".

== Digitisation ==
Many issues of the paper have been digitised as part of the Australian Newspapers Digitisation Program a project of the National Library of Australia in cooperation with the State Library of New South Wales.

== See also ==
- List of newspapers in Australia
- List of newspapers in New South Wales
