= White-anting =

Internal erosion of a foundation

White-anting is an Australian term for the process of internal erosion of a foundation. It is often used in reference to groups such as political parties or organisations where information from group insiders is 'leaked' or used to undermine the goals of the group. The Macquarie Dictionary says the verb "to white-ant" means "to subvert or undermine from within".

The term is derived from the action of termites (white ants) eating the inside of wooden building foundations, often leaving no outward evidence, until the structure crumbles.

== Usage ==
In 1938, Gordon Childe used the term in a letter to Rajani Palme Dutt, explaining how in his books he used the method of 'white-anting' to get his Marxist message to the masses rather than labeling himself as a Marxist and using Marxist terms, thus eroding the institution of bourgeois scholarship. In 2012, the Illawarra Mercury newspaper also used the term, when it reported that then-government minister Greg Combet wanted his colleagues to stop white-anting the Australian Prime Minister Julia Gillard.

It was used on the soap opera Neighbours several times including in 2006. In July 2019, Season 3 Episode 10 of the Australian TV show 'Sea Patrol', Buffer opines that Charge's ex-wife white-anted him by turning his kids against him.

In 2019, Steve Smith, the returned former captain of the Australian cricket team, was accused of white-anting the new captain Tim Paine.
