= William Gibbs (Australian politician) =

Australian politician

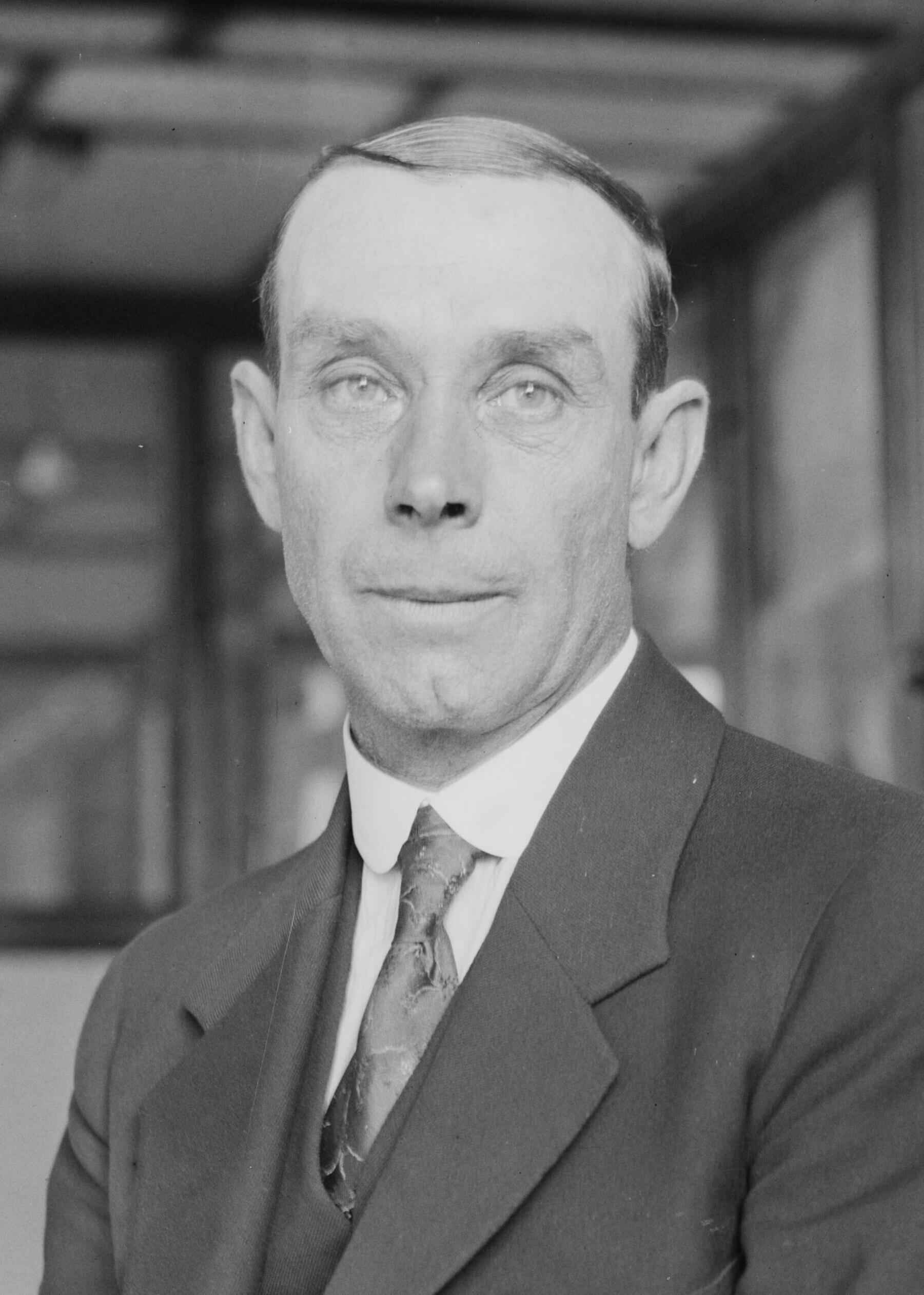
- Gibbs in 1925

Senator for New South Wales
- In office 1 April 1925 – 13 November 1925
- Preceded by: Jack Power

Personal details
- Born: 5 July 1879 Melbourne, Victoria, Australia
- Died: 17 August 1944 (aged 65) Belmore, New South Wales, Australia
- Party: Labor
- Spouse: Ellen Emery (m. 1906; died 1939)
- Occupation: Soldier; Miner; Trade unionist

William Albion Gibbs (5 July 1879 – 17 August 1944) was an Australian politician. He was a member of the Australian Labor Party (ALP) and briefly served as a Senator for New South Wales in 1925, filling the casual vacancy caused by the death of Jack Power. He was the party's assistant state secretary in New South Wales from 1915 to 1925 and stood unsuccessfully for parliament at state and federal level on several occasions.

== Early life ==
Gibbs was born in Melbourne on 5 July 1879. He was the son of Mary Ann (née Martin) and Frederick Gibbs; his father was a solicitor.

Gibbs attended King's College in Fitzroy. He enlisted in the Victorian Citizen Bushmen during the Boer War and served in South Africa from 1901 to 1902. On his return he found work as a miner at Cobar, New South Wales, where he became involved in the labour movement. He was a paid organiser for the Amalgamated Miners' Association of New South Wales from 1911 to 1914, including at the Mount Boppy Gold Mine where he was involved in an altercation with the mine manager and sued for assault.

During World War I, Gibbs enlisted in the Australian Imperial Force in August 1914. He was posted to the 2nd Battalion and subsequently served in Egypt and Gallipoli. He was promoted from lance sergeant to company quartermaster sergeant during the war, returning to Australia in 1916. On his return he established the Returned Soldiers' No‑Conscription League of Australia, which was active in the movement against conscription.

== Politics ==
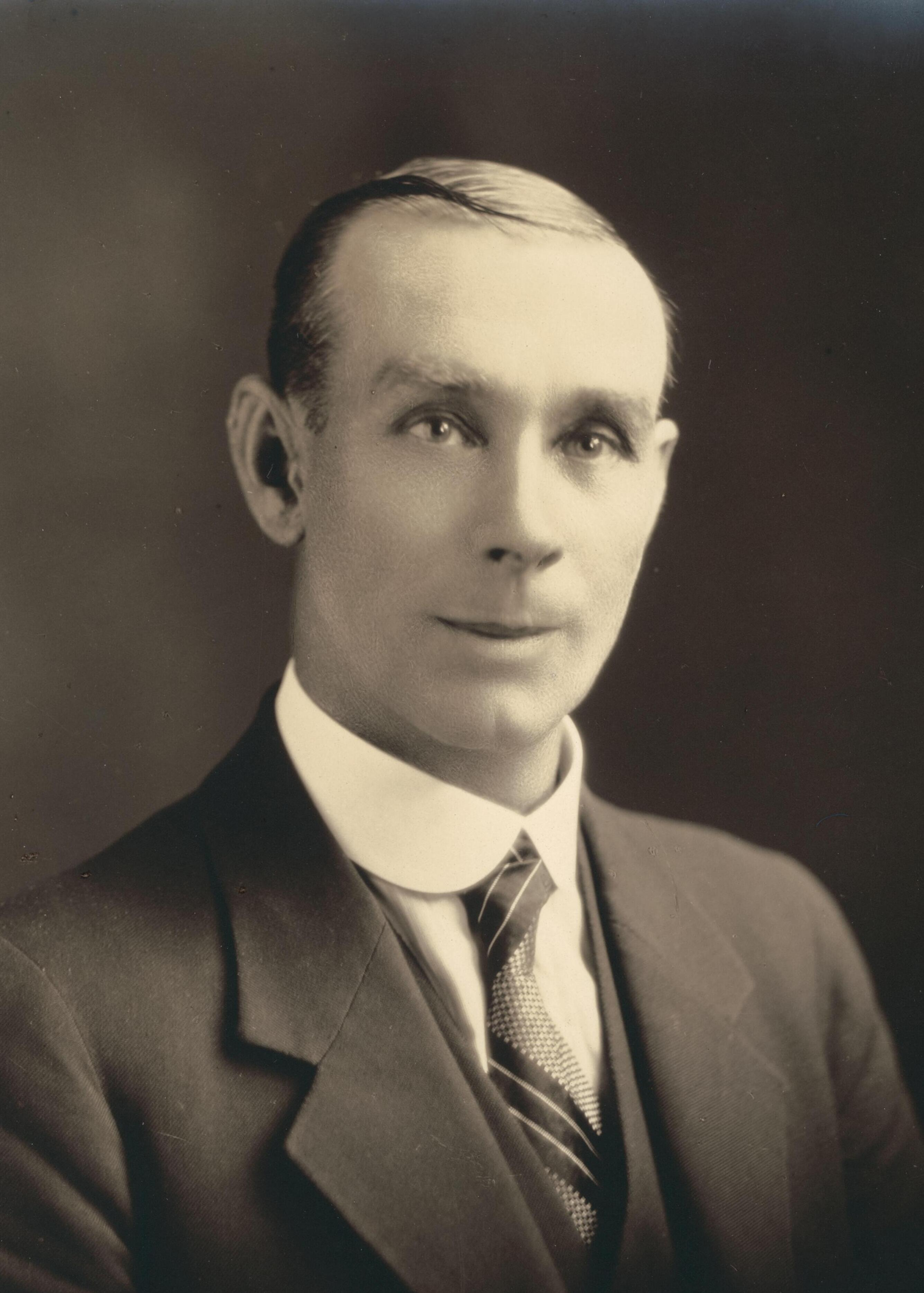
Gibbs hatless

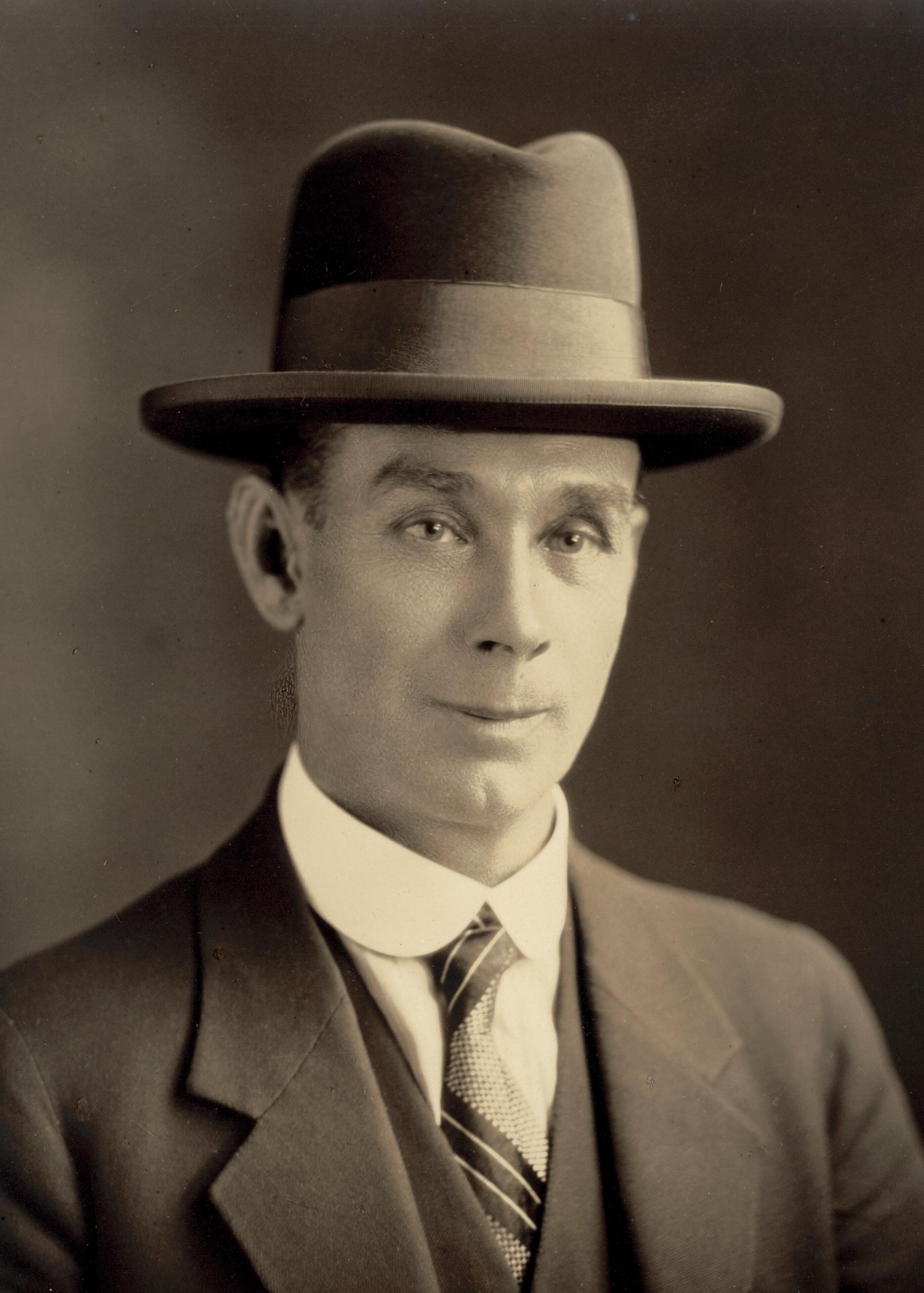
Gibbs wearing a hat

Gibbs was elected assistant secretary of the ALP in New South Wales in 1915. He was an unsuccessful candidate for the New South Wales Legislative Assembly on two occasions, running in Allowrie at the 1917 state election and in St George at the 1920 election. He was elected to the party's federal executive in 1922 and also served as the editor of Labor News from 1922 to 1923.

In January 1925, Gibbs was endorsed by the ALP to fill the casual vacancy caused by the death of Senator Jack Power, who had himself filled the casual vacancy caused by the death of Allan McDougall in November 1924. He was formally elected to the vacancy by the Parliament of New South Wales on 1 April 1925. He tied with Nationalist candidate Josiah Thomas in the parliamentary vote and was elected on the casting vote of the presiding officer Fred Flowers.

In the Senate, Gibbs "spoke often and sharply across a range of subjects". He advocated on behalf of the unemployed, particularly returned soldiers, supported the White Australia policy, and supported the Bruce–Page government's establishment of a rural credit branch of the Commonwealth Bank. During debate on the Peace Officers Bill he unsuccessfully moved an amendment that would restrict peace officers' search powers to those granted under warrant by the High Court of Australia.

Gibbs had received the endorsement of ALP leader Jack Lang for the vacancy on the understanding that he would not contest the 1925 election. He subsequently reneged on his promise and nominated for preselection, winning a position on the party's Senate ticket. He was eventually disendorsed by the state executive shortly before the close of nominations, following pressure from Lang.

Gibbs remained loyal to "Federal Labor" during the 1931 ALP split in New South Wales. He stood unsuccessfully for the House of Representatives at the 1931 federal election as an anti-Lang candidate, running in the seat of Parkes.

== Personal life ==
In 1906, Gibbs married Ellen Emery with whom he had two children. He was widowed in 1939.

After leaving parliament, Gibbs worked as a labourer and clerk, also receiving a part military pension from 1936. He died of heart failure and arteriosclerosis on 17 August 1944 at his home in Belmore, New South Wales.
