= Jack Power (politician) =

Australian politician

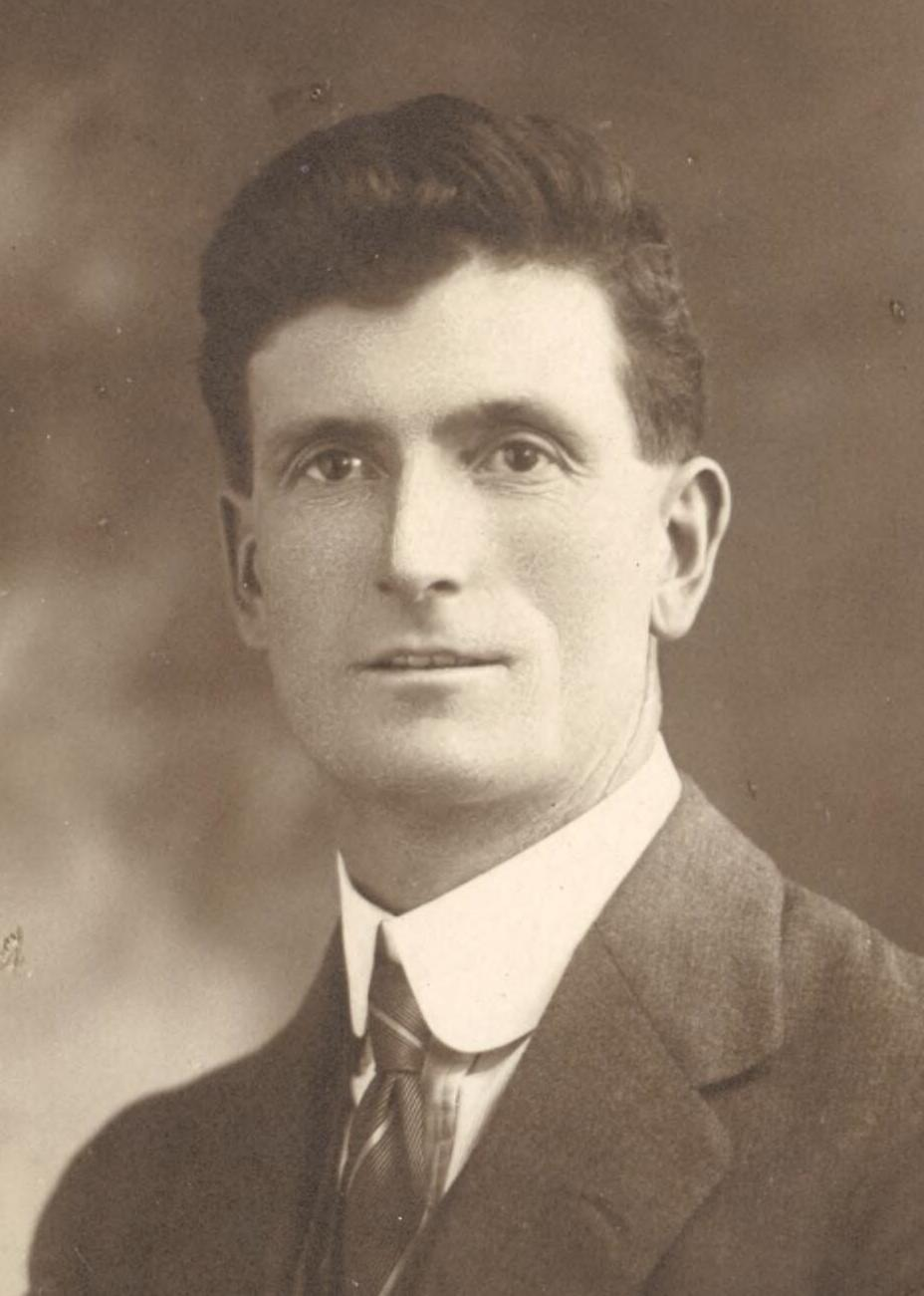

Senator for New South Wales
- In office 20 November 1924 – 13 January 1925
- Preceded by: Allan McDougall
- Succeeded by: William Gibbs

Member of the New South Wales Legislative Council
- In office 30 August 1921 – 20 November 1924

Personal details
- Born: John Maurice Power; 15 December 1883 South Hay, New South Wales, Australia
- Died: 13 January 1925 (aged 41) Glenbrook, New South Wales, Australia
- Party: Labor
- Spouses: Alice Duggan (m. 1911; died 1913) Stella Horrigan (m. 1918)
- Occupation: Drayman, farmhand, pastrycook, taxi driver, tobacconist

John Maurice Power (15 December 1883 – 13 January 1925) was an Australian trade unionist and politician. He was a member of the Australian Labor Party (ALP) and was appointed to the Senate to fill a casual vacancy in 1924, after previously serving as mayor of Paddington (1917–1918), ALP state president (1921–1923), and on the New South Wales Legislative Council (1921–1924). However, he died two months after his appointment at the age of 41, without taking his seat in parliament.

== Early life ==
Power was born on 15 December 1883 in South Hay, New South Wales. He was the fifth child of Irish immigrant parents Maria (née Toohey) and John Maurice Power. The family relocated to Sydney during his childhood. Power held a variety of occupations before embarking on a full-time political career. He worked variously as a drayman, farmhand, pastrycook, taxi driver and tobacconist. He was president of the Pastrycooks' Union and was commissioned as a justice of the peace in 1913.

== Career ==
Power's involvement with the ALP began at a young age, and from 1910 he was a regular delegate to state conferences. He was elected president of the Paddington branch in 1912 and subsequently won election to the Paddington Municipal Council in 1914, later serving a term as mayor from 1917 to 1918. He was an anti-conscriptionist and remained loyal to the ALP during the 1916 party split. Power was elected state president of the ALP in 1921, having first been elected to the state executive in 1917. He held the position until 1923, when he replaced William Albion Gibbs as editor of The Labor News.

On 30 August 1921, Power was appointed to the New South Wales Legislative Council and served until 20 November 1924. when he was appointed to the Australian Senate to fill the vacancy caused by the death of Senator Allan McDougall. Premier Jack Lang stated that he would retire after completing McDougall's term and would not receive ALP preselection at the next federal election. He died under two months later, necessitating the appointment of NSW ALP Assistant Secretary William Gibbs.

== Personal life ==
Power married Alice May Duggan on 21 January 1911, with whom he had one son. He was widowed in 1913 and remarried on 4 November 1918 to Stella Horrigan, with whom he had a second son.

Power died at his home in Glenbrook on 13 January 1925, after an illness of several months.

Civic offices
Preceded by Michael Purcell	Mayor of Paddington; 1918–1919	Succeeded by Michael Purcell
