= Municipality of Paddington =

Former local government area in New South Wales, Australia

Municipality of Paddington New South Wales
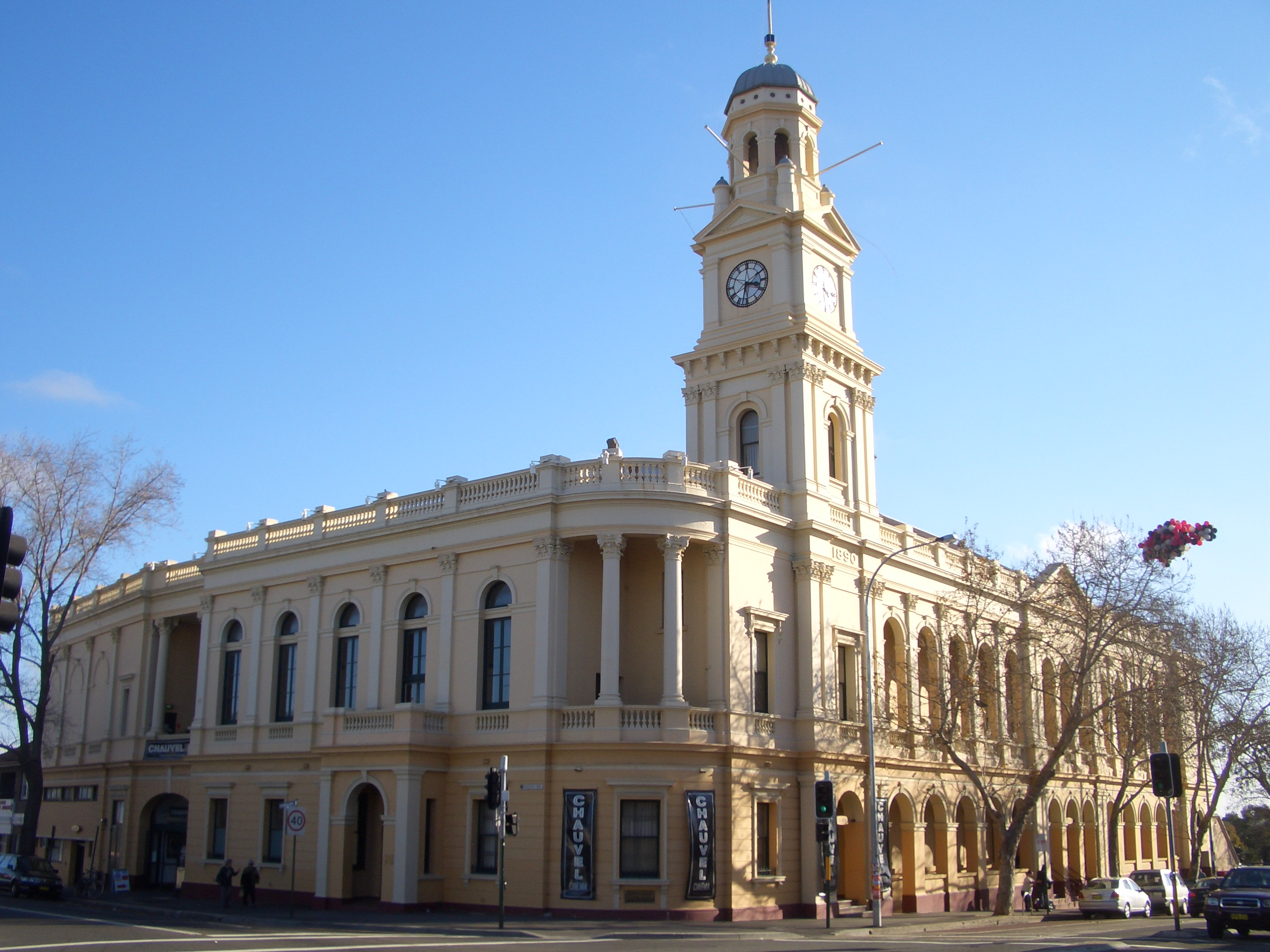
- Paddington Town Hall on Oxford Street, council seat from 1891–1948.
- Population: 24,681 (1947 census)
  - Density: 14,500/km^{2} (37,600/sq mi)
- Established: 17 April 1860
- Abolished: 31 December 1948
- Area: 1.7 km^{2} (0.7 sq mi)
- Council seat: Paddington Town Hall
- Region: Inner City/Eastern Suburbs
LGAs around Municipality of Paddington:
Sydney		Woollahra
Sydney	Municipality of Paddington	Woollahra
Sydney	Sydney	Randwick

The Municipality of Paddington was a local government area of Sydney, New South Wales, Australia. The municipality was proclaimed on 17 April 1860 and, with an area of 1.7 square kilometres, included the entire suburb of Paddington and parts of Edgecliff. The council was amalgamated with the City of Sydney to the east with the passing of the Local Government (Areas) Act 1948, although the former council area was transferred in 1968 to the Municipality of Woollahra, transferred to the City of South Sydney in 1989 and was then split in 2003 between the City of Sydney and the Municipality of Woollahra.

== Council history and location ==
The municipality was proclaimed by the Governor of New South Wales, Sir William Denison, on 17 April 1860, bounded by New South Head Road to the north, Jersey Road and Ocean Street to the east, Rushcutters Creek to the northwest and Moore Park to the south. The first nine-member council was declared elected on 23 May 1860. On 25 November 1864, the municipality was divided into three wards: Upper Paddington Ward, Lower Paddington Ward and Glenmore Ward.

In 1889, at the urging of alderman and mayor, Charles Hellmrich, land was acquired on Oxford Street adjoining Victoria Barracks, for a new Town Hall. In early 1890, a design by architect John Edward Kemp was chosen and on 8 November 1890, the foundation stone was laid by Premier Sir Henry Parkes. On 3 October 1891 the new town hall was formally opened by the Governor, The Earl of Jersey.

Following the enactment of the Municipalities Act, 1867, the title of Chairman was renamed "Mayor" and the council became known as the Borough of Paddington (From 28 December 1906, following the passing of the Local Government Act, 1906, the council was again renamed as the "Municipality of Paddington"). The wards were adjusted following a petition on 5 January 1884, adding a fourth ward and renaming two: Upper Ward, Middle Ward, Lower Ward and Glenmore Ward. In July 1907, a proposal by the mayor, Denis Brown, to abolish the ward system was voted down by the council.

By the end of the Second World War, the NSW Government had realised that its ideas of infrastructure expansion could not be realised by the present system of the mostly-poor inner-city municipal councils and the Minister for Local Government, Joseph Cahill, passed a bill in 1948 that abolished a significant number of those councils. Under the Local Government (Areas) Act 1948, Paddington Municipal Council was merged with the larger neighbouring City of Sydney which was located immediately to the west, becoming the Paddington Ward, returning two aldermen, the penultimate and final mayors, Frank Green and Walter Farley Read.

== Mayors ==
Years	Chairman	Notes
June 1860 – 12 February 1861	William Perry	
12 February 1861 – 14 February 1862	John Carlisle Humphrey	
14 February 1862 – 13 February 1863	Thomas Alston	
13 February 1863 – February 1864	John Carlisle Humphrey	
February 1864 – 20 February 1865	Charles Artlett	
20 February 1865 – 20 February 1866	William Taylor	
20 February 1866 – 19 February 1867	Robert Iredale	
19 February 1867 – 17 February 1868	Charles Artlett	
Years	Mayor	Notes
17 February 1868 – February 1870	William Taylor	
February 1870 – 25 February 1871	John Carlisle Humphrey	
25 February 1871 – February 1872	Robert Campbell	
February 1872 – 10 February 1873	Fergus Maclean	
10 February 1873 – March 1874	Hosea Bennett	
March 1874 – 11 February 1876	John Reddy	
11 February 1876 – 12 February 1878	James Oatley	
12 February 1878 – 14 February 1879	Charles Campbell	
14 February 1879 – 12 February 1881	William Taylor	
12 February 1881 – 17 February 1883	William Brown	
17 February 1883 – 16 February 1884	Emanuel Watson	
16 February 1884 – 14 February 1885	Charles Campbell	
14 February 1885 – 12 February 1886	John Percy McGuanne	
12 February 1886 – 11 February 1887	Charles Hellmrich	
11 February 1887 – 17 February 1888	Charles Campbell	
17 February 1888 – 12 February 1891	Charles Hellmrich	
12 February 1891 – February 1892	Dugald McIntyre	
February 1892 – 16 February 1893	John White	
16 February 1893 – 16 February 1894	James Dillon	
16 February 1894 – 19 February 1895	Tom George	
19 February 1895 – 11 February 1896	George Parker Jones	
11 February 1896 – 12 February 1897	Arthur Walker	
12 February 1897 – 24 February 1900	Thomas John West	
24 February 1900 – 15 February 1901	Albert Pointing	
15 February 1901 – 14 February 1902	Robert William Usher	
14 February 1902 – 14 February 1903	George Walker	
14 February 1903 – 17 February 1905	William Harris Howard	
17 February 1905 – February 1908	Denis Brown	
February 1908 – 2 February 1909	George Walker	
2 February 1909 – 6 February 1911	Francis Meacle	
6 February 1911 – 10 February 1913	Albert Pointing	
10 February 1913 – 4 February 1915	Michael Kerrigan	
4 February 1915 – February 1916	Francis Meacle	
February 1916 – 12 September 1916	James William Gosbell	
12 September 1916 – February 1917	John Thomas Percival Marsh	
February 1917 – 12 February 1918	Michael Purcell	
12 February 1918 – February 1919	Jack Power (ALP)	
February 1919 – February 1920	Michael Purcell	
February 1920 – December 1921	Frank Green (ALP)	
December 1921 – December 1923	Michael Purcell	
December 1923 – December 1924	Albert Gahan	
December 1924 – December 1926	Harold Falvey (ALP)	
December 1926 – December 1927	Maurice O'Sullivan (ALP)	
December 1927 – December 1928	Henry Dickinson	
December 1928 – December 1929	William Bates	
December 1929 – December 1930	Nicholas Connolly	
December 1930 – December 1931	Michael Purcell	
December 1931 – December 1932	Henry Jones	
December 1932 – October 1933	Robert Stapleton	
October 1933 – December 1934	Morris Curotta	
December 1934 – December 1935	William Bates	
December 1935 – December 1936	Thomas Joseph Whelan	
December 1936 – December 1937	Richard Herbert Graydon	
December 1937 – December 1938	John Thomas Whelan	
December 1938 – December 1940	William Fandlan (ALP)	
December 1940 – December 1941	Roger Bede Hill	
December 1941 – December 1942	Walter Farley Read (ALP)	
December 1942 – December 1943	Joseph Carr	
December 1943 – December 1944	Edward Cutler	
December 1944 – December 1946	Frank Green (ALP)	
December 1946 – 31 December 1948	Walter Farley Read (ALP)	
