= Charles Frederick Cox =

Australian politician

Major General Charles Frederick Cox CB, CMG, DSO, VD
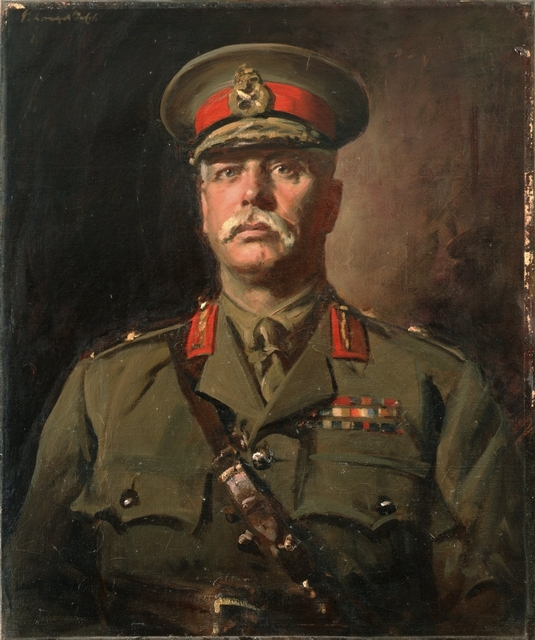
- Portrait of Brigadier General Charles Cox, 1921

Senator for New South Wales
- In office 1 July 1920 – 30 June 1938

Personal details
- Born: 2 May 1863 Pennant Hills, New South Wales
- Died: 20 November 1944 (aged 81) Croydon, New South Wales
- Party: Nationalist Party of Australia
- Nickname: Fighting Charlie

Military service
- Allegiance: Australia
- Branch/service: Australian Army
- Years of service: 1891–1923
- Rank: Major General
- Commands: New South Wales Lancers; 3rd New South Wales Mounted Rifles; 6th Light Horse Regiment; 1st Light Horse Brigade; 4th Light Horse Brigade; 1st Cavalry Division
- Battles/wars: Second Boer War; Relief of Kimberley; Battle of Paardeberg; Battle of Diamond Hill; First World War; Gallipoli campaign; Sinai and Palestine campaign; Battle of Magdhaba; Battle of Abu Tellul
- Awards: Companion of the Order of the Bath; Companion of the Order of St Michael and St George; Distinguished Service Order; Volunteer Decoration; Mentioned in Despatches (5)

Major General Charles Frederick Cox, CB, CMG, DSO, VD (2 May 1863 – 20 November 1944) was an Australian Army officer and politician. He retired in 1923 as an honorary major general.

== Early life ==
Charles Frederick Cox was born on 2 May 1863 at Pennant Hills, New South Wales. He was a grandson of William Cox. He was educated in Parramatta and became a clerk with the New South Wales Railways traffic audit branch in 1881.

Cox enlisted in the New South Wales Lancers in 1891 and was commissioned as a lieutenant in 1894. In 1897 he was chosen to head a detachment of the regiment in the ceremonies for Queen Victoria's Diamond Jubilee. He married Minnie Elizabeth Gibbons on 7 March 1894. Promoted to captain in 1897, he travelled to England again in 1899 in command of a squadron of the lancers for training with the British cavalry.

== Second Boer War ==
The squadron was training alongside the 6th Dragoon Guards (Carabiniers) at Aldershot, England, when the Boer War broke out. Cox volunteered himself and his squadron for service in South Africa. Some 70 of his men went to South Africa; another 31, for various reasons, did not, and returned to Australia. Cox and his volunteers arrived in Cape Town in December 1899 and were the first colonial volunteers to arrive in Cape Town.

The squadron saw only limited action throughout their first tour, but did take part in the last major battle of the war, the Battle of Paardeberg, on 18 February 1900. In May 1900, Cox was attached to the Inniskilling Dragoons, under the command of Major Edmund Allenby.

The lancers returned to Australia in December 1900. Cox was promoted to major and given command of the newly formed 3rd New South Wales Mounted Rifles, with which he returned to South Africa in April 1901. In June he was made an honorary lieutenant colonel. In the latter half of 1901, Cox's regiment joined part of a force led by Colonel Michael Rimington. They covered 1,814 miles in 153 days. There was little action apart from the occasional skirmish, but these cost the regiment 5 killed and 19 wounded.

While the British regulars had doubts about Cox's competence in 1899, by the end of the war in 1902 Cox had earned considerable accolades from Colonel Rimington. From his men he had earned the nickname "Fighting Charlie".

For his service during the war, he was appointed a Companion of the Order of the Bath (CB) in the South Africa honours list published on 26 June 1902, and received the decoration from the Prince of Wales during a large coronation parade of colonial troops in London on 1 July 1902.

Cox remained with the lancers, which became the 1st Light Horse in 1903. He became the commander in 1906 and was promoted to lieutenant colonel on 2 April 1908. In 1911 Cox was transferred to the unattached officer list.

== First World War ==
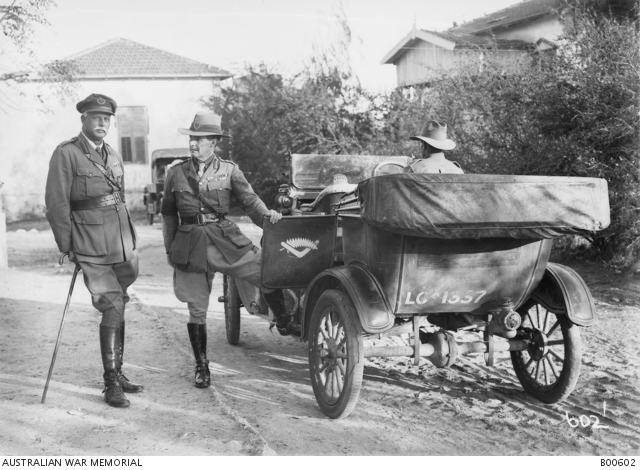
Major General Edward Chaytor (right) with Brigadier General Cox in Rishon Lezion, November 1918.

In September 1914, Cox was appointed to command the AIF's 6th Light Horse Regiment. The regiment trained in Sydney and Egypt before arriving at Gallipoli for dismounted service on 19 May 1915. Two days later, Cox was wounded by shrapnel while in his dugout. He was evacuated and did not rejoin his regiment until 1 July. When Brigadier General Harry Chauvel took over the New Zealand and Australian Division on 19 September, Cox became acting commander of the 1st Light Horse Brigade. On 6 December 1915 the appointment became permanent and Cox was promoted to colonel and temporary brigadier general. He held this post for the duration of the war.

The 1st Light Horse Brigade arrived back in Egypt on 28 December 1915. The brigade was sent to Wadi Natrun, south west of Cairo, to protect the Kataba Canal against the Senussi. On 11 February 1916, the brigade, less the 3rd Light Horse Regiment, entrained for Minia. They remained there until May, patrolling the area for signs of the Senussi.

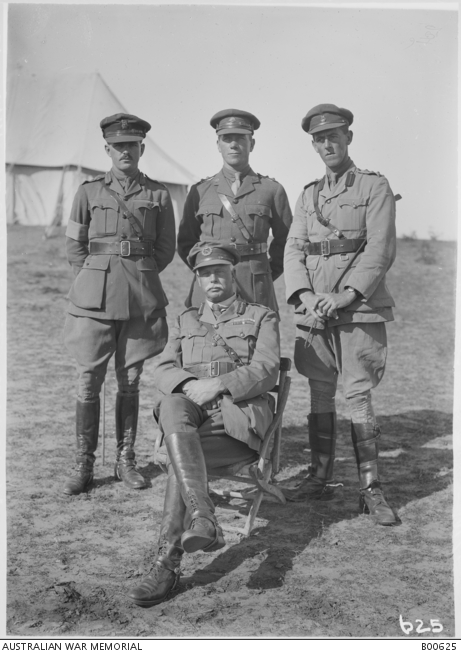
Group portrait of Brigadier General Charles Cox, sitting, and staff of the 1st Australian Light Horse Brigade, pictured here in Palestine, November 1918.

In May Cox went to England on sick leave. He rejoined his brigade on 26 August 1916 on the Suez Canal front, where they now formed part of Chauvel's ANZAC Mounted Division. Cox and his brigade took part in multiple actions during the Sinai and Palestine campaign, including the Battle of Magdhaba, Battle of Beersheba and captured the town of Jericho.

He was later awarded the Distinguished Service Order (DSO), the citation for which appeared in The London Gazette in November 1918 and reads as follows:

For conspicuous gallantry and devotion to duty. His quickness in realising the situation, and organising a counter-attack, resulted in the capture of a position before the enemy had time to consolidate. He also captured about 150 prisoners who were attacking a small post in a neighbouring bluff, and then re-adjusted his line before supports could arrive to support the enemy support troops.

== Post-war ==
Cox returned to Australia on 13 March 1919. In 1920 he was elected to the Senate as a Nationalist representing New South Wales, a seat he held until 1938. He travelled widely through New South Wales and became well known and popular. As a senator, he took an interest in defence policy, the development of the railway system, and the construction of the new national capital in Canberra.

Cox was appointed to command the 4th Light Horse Brigade in 1920, and then the 1st Cavalry Division in 1921. In 1923 he was transferred to the retired list with the rank of honorary major general.

He died at Croydon on 20 November 1944 and was buried in the Carlingford Cemetery with full military honours.
