= Allan McDougall =

Australian politician

Senator Allan McDougall
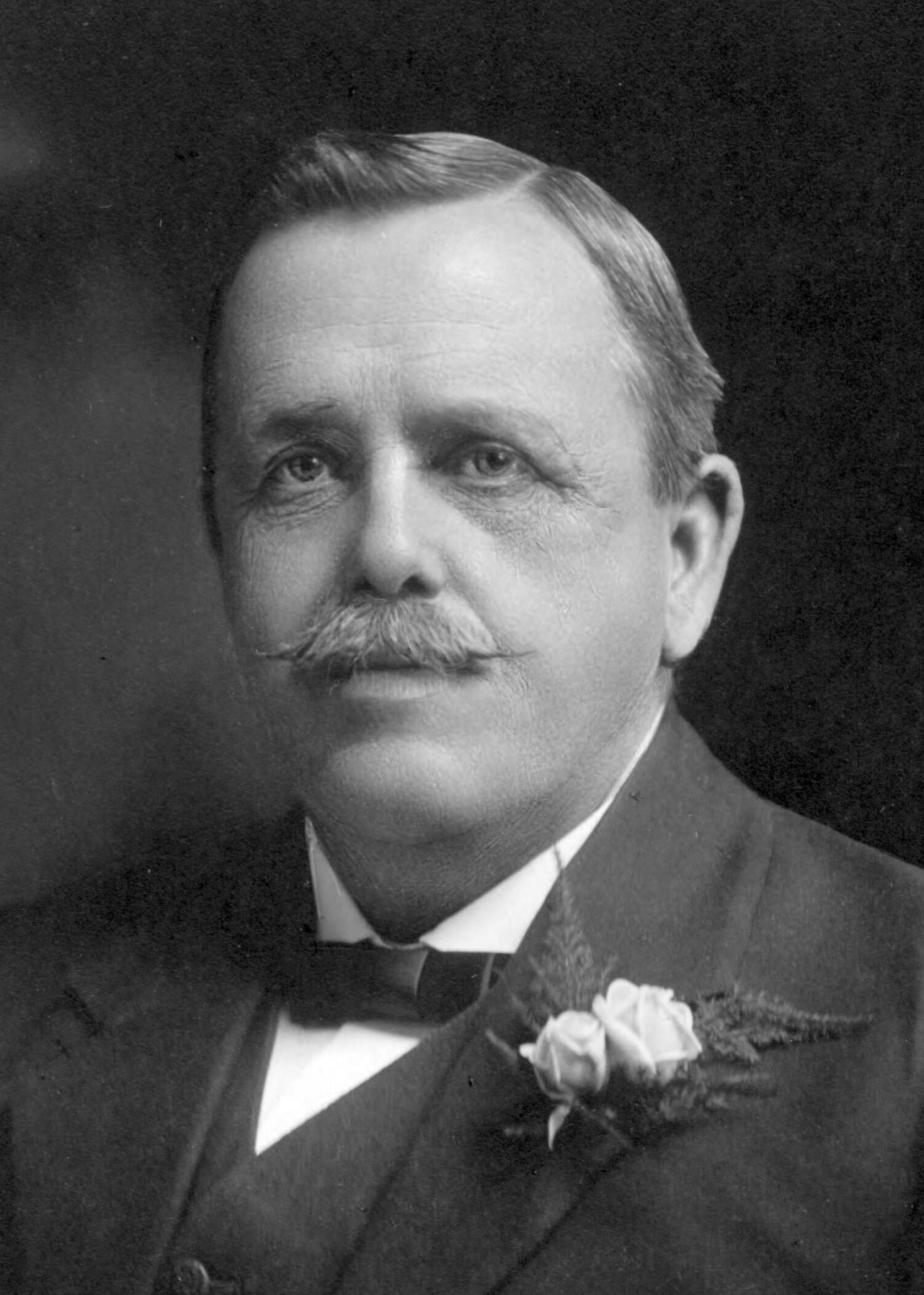

Senator for New South Wales
- In office 6 December 1922 – 14 October 1924
- Preceded by: Henry Garling
- Succeeded by: Jack Power
- In office 1 July 1910 – 30 June 1920
- Preceded by: John Gray
- Succeeded by: Charles Frederick Cox

Personal details
- Born: 2 August 1857 Pyrmont, Colony of New South Wales
- Died: 14 October 1924 (aged 67) Darlinghurst, New South Wales, Australia
- Party: Labor
- Occupation: Boilermaker; Politician

Allan McDougall (2 August 1857 – 14 October 1924) was an Australian politician. He was a Labor member of the Australian Senate from 1910 to 1919 and from 1922 until his death in 1924.

McDougall was born in Pyrmont, Sydney and received a primary education before undertaking a boilermaker apprenticeship with the Australasian Steam Navigation Company, later working at Mort's Dock. He was one of the first members of the United Society of Boilermakers and Iron Shipbuilders of New South Wales and was heavily involved in the union for many years, serving alternately as president and secretary at various times. He also served as secretary of the Eight Hours Day committee for ten years. A keen sportsman and footballer, he was also patron of the New South Wales League of Wheelmen (a cycling club) and the Glebe District Rugby League Football Club.

In 1910, he was elected to the Australian Senate as a member of the Labor Party. He was chairman of the Select Committee on Fitzroy Dock and a member of the Joint Committee on Public Accounts. In 1917, he was tried and acquitted for an alleged breach of the War Precautions Act after a speech regarding voting in the conscription referendum. He was defeated in 1919, but was re-elected in 1922. In 1923, he was a member of the Royal Commission on National Insurance. However, he died in office in 1924 from complications of diabetes; he had reportedly been in poor health for some time. He was buried in the Presbyterian section of Rookwood Cemetery.
