= List of elections in 1928 =

The following elections occurred in the year 1928.

== Africa ==
- 1928 Southern Rhodesian general election

== Asia ==
- 1928 Japanese general election
- 1928 Persian legislative election
- 1928 Philippine House of Representatives elections
- 1928 Philippine Senate elections
- 1928 Philippine legislative election

== Europe ==
- 1928 Danish Landsting election
- 1928 Faroese general election
- 1928 French legislative election
- 1928 German federal election
- 1928 Greek legislative election
- 1928 Irish local elections
- 1928 Swedish general election
- 1928 Latvian parliamentary election
- 1928 Liechtenstein general election
- 1928 Luxembourg general election
- 1928 Norwegian local elections
- 1928 Polish legislative election
- 1928 Portuguese presidential election
- 1928 Romanian general election
- 1928 Swiss federal election
- 1928 Swiss referendums

=== United Kingdom ===
- 1928 Aberdeen North by-election
- 1928 Ashton-under-Lyne by-election
- 1928 Bristol West by-election
- 1928 Carmarthen by-election
- 1928 Cheltenham by-election
- 1928 Epsom by-election
- 1928 Faversham by-election
- 1928 Halifax by-election
- 1928 Hanley by-election
- 1928 Holborn by-election
- 1928 Ilford by-election
- 1928 Lancaster by-election
- 1928 Linlithgowshire by-election
- 1928 Middlesbrough West by-election
- 1928 Northampton by-election
- 1928 Sheffield Hallam by-election
- 1928 St Ives by-election
- 1928 St Marylebone by-election
- 1928 Tavistock by-election

==== United Kingdom local ====
===== English local =====
- 1928 Southwark Borough election

== North America ==
=== Canada ===
- 1928 British Columbia general election
- 1928 Edmonton municipal election
- 1928 Newfoundland general election
- 1928 Nova Scotia general election
- 1928 Sudbury municipal election
- 1928 Toronto municipal election
- 1928 Yukon general election

=== Caribbean ===
- 1928 Cuban Constitutional Assembly election
- 1928 Cuban presidential election
- 1928 Haitian constitutional referendum

=== United States ===
- 1928 New York state election
- 1928 United States elections
- 1928 United States presidential election

==== United States lieutenant gubernatorial ====
- 1928 Connecticut lieutenant gubernatorial election
- 1928 Illinois lieutenant gubernatorial election
- 1928 Minnesota lieutenant gubernatorial election
- 1928 Missouri lieutenant gubernatorial election
- 1928 Nebraska lieutenant gubernatorial election
- 1928 Texas lieutenant gubernatorial election
- 1928 Wisconsin lieutenant gubernatorial election

==== United States gubernatorial ====
- 1928 Arizona gubernatorial election
- 1928 Arkansas gubernatorial election
- 1928 Colorado gubernatorial election
- 1928 Connecticut gubernatorial election
- 1928 Delaware gubernatorial election
- 1928 Florida gubernatorial election
- 1928 Georgia gubernatorial election
- 1928 Idaho gubernatorial election
- 1928 Illinois gubernatorial election
- 1928 Indiana gubernatorial election
- 1928 Iowa gubernatorial election
- 1928 Kansas gubernatorial election
- 1928 Maine gubernatorial election
- 1928 Massachusetts gubernatorial election
- 1928 Michigan gubernatorial election
- 1928 Minnesota gubernatorial election
- 1928 Missouri gubernatorial election
- 1928 Montana gubernatorial election
- 1928 Nebraska gubernatorial election
- 1928 New Hampshire gubernatorial election
- 1928 New Jersey gubernatorial election
- 1928 New Mexico gubernatorial election
- 1928 New York gubernatorial election
- 1928 North Carolina gubernatorial election
- 1928 North Dakota gubernatorial election
- 1928 Ohio gubernatorial election
- 1928 Rhode Island gubernatorial election
- 1928 South Dakota gubernatorial election
- 1928 Tennessee gubernatorial election
- 1928 Texas gubernatorial election
- 1928 United States gubernatorial elections
- 1928 Utah gubernatorial election
- 1928 Vermont gubernatorial election
- 1928 Washington gubernatorial election
- 1928 West Virginia gubernatorial election
- 1928 Wisconsin gubernatorial election

==== United States House of Representatives ====
- 1928 United States House of Representatives elections
- 1928 United States House of Representatives elections in California
- 1928 United States House of Representatives elections in New Mexico
- 1928 United States House of Representatives elections in South Carolina

==== United States Senate ====
- 1928 United States Senate elections
- 1928 United States Senate election in Arizona
- 1928 United States Senate election in California
- 1928 United States Senate election in Connecticut
- 1928 United States Senate election in Delaware
- 1928 United States Senate election in Florida
- 1928 United States Senate special election in Idaho
- 1928 United States Senate special election in Illinois
- 1928 United States Senate election in Indiana
- 1928 United States Senate election in Maine
- 1928 United States Senate election in Maryland
- 1928 United States Senate election in Massachusetts
- 1928 United States Senate elections in Michigan
- 1928 United States Senate election in Minnesota
- 1928 United States Senate election in Missouri
- 1928 United States Senate election in Montana
- 1928 United States Senate election in Nebraska
- 1928 United States Senate election in New Jersey
- 1928 United States Senate election in New York
- 1928 United States Senate election in North Dakota
- 1928 United States Senate election in Ohio
- 1928 United States Senate special election in Ohio
- 1928 United States Senate election in Pennsylvania
- 1928 United States Senate election in Tennessee
- 1928 United States Senate election in Texas
- 1928 United States Senate election in Vermont
- 1928 United States Senate election in Virginia
- 1928 United States Senate election in Washington
- 1928 United States Senate election in Wisconsin
- 1928 United States Senate election in Wyoming

==== United States mayoral elections ====
- 1928 Auburn, Alabama municipal elections

== South America ==
- 1928 Argentine general election
- 1928 Bolivian legislative election
- 1928 Costa Rican general election
- 1928 Honduran general election
- 1928 Nicaraguan general election
- 1928 Panamanian general election
- 1928 Paraguayan presidential election
- 1928 Salvadoran legislative election
- 1928 Uruguayan general election

== Oceania ==
=== Australia ===
- 1928 Australian Senate election
- 1928 Australian federal election
- 1928 Australian referendum
- 1928 Brighton state by-election
- 1928 Coogee state by-election
- 1928 Hamilton state by-election
- 1928 Martin by-election
- 1928 Tasmanian state election
- 1928 Wide Bay by-election
- 1928 Wollondilly state by-election

=== New Zealand ===
- 1928 New Zealand general election

== See also ==
- Category:1928 elections
