= 1928 Australian Senate election =

- 17 November 1928

19 of the 36 seats in the Senate 19 seats needed for a majority
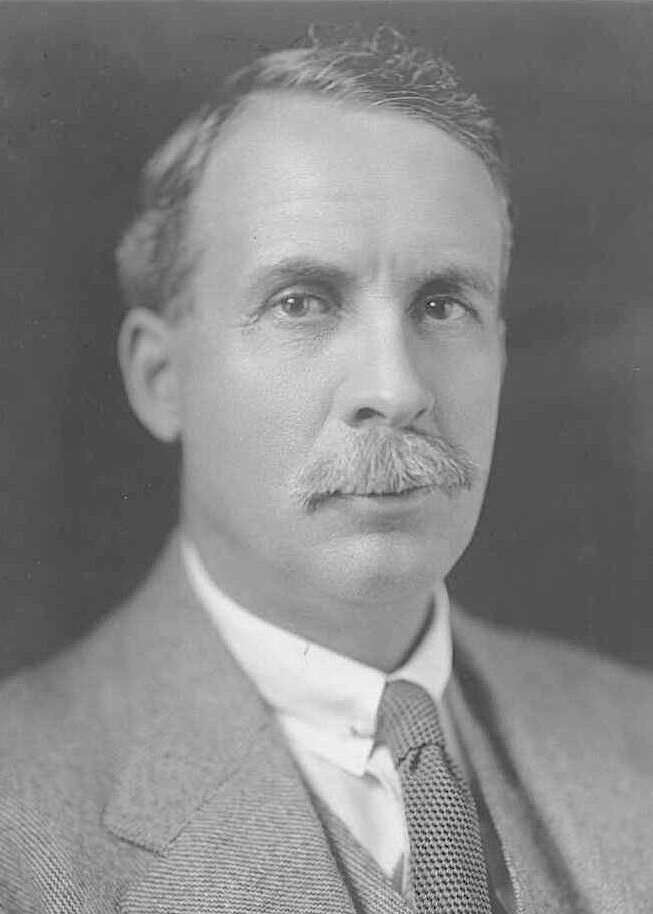

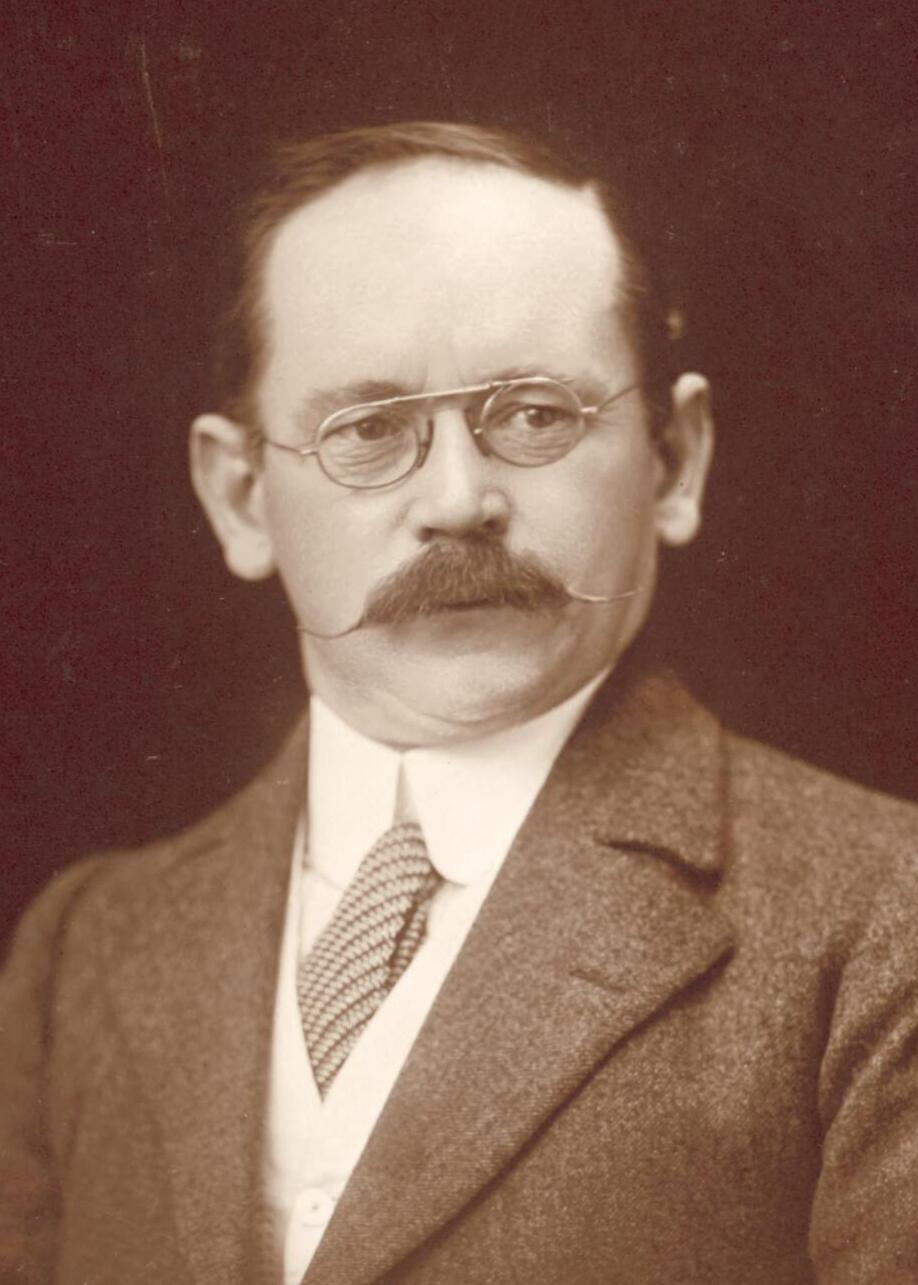
	First party	Second party
Leader	George Pearce	Ted Needham
Party	Nationalist/Country coalition	Labor
Leader's seat	Western Australia	Western Australia
Seats before	28	8
Seats won	12	7
Seats after	29	7
Seat change	▲1	▼1
Popular vote	1,466,323	1,422,418
Percentage	50.46	48.95
Swing	▼4.35	▲3.93

The 1928 Australian Senate election was held on 17 November 1928 to elect 19 of the 36 senators in the Australian Senate as part of the 1928 federal election. Each state elected three senators to serve a six-year term beginning on 1 July 1929, except for Queensland, who elected an extra senator to fill a casual vacancy.

The Nationalist–Country Coalition won 12 of the 19 contested seats. This increased the Coalition's seat total to 29. Meanwhile, Labor retained 7 out of their 8 contested seats, decreasing their total by one.

== Australia ==
1928 Australian federal election: Senate, National
Party	Votes	%	±	Seats			
Party	Votes	%	±	Seats won	Not up	New total	Seat change
Nationalist	1,141,405	39.28	−6.07	10	14	24	Steady
Country	324,918	11.18	+1.73	2	3	5	▲1
Nationalist/Country Coalition	1,466,323	50.46	–4.35	12	17	29	▲1
Labor	1,422,418	48.95	+3.93	7	0	7	▼1
Independents	17,092	0.59	+0.42	0	0	0	Steady
Total	2,905,833	100.00	–	19	17	36	–
Invalid/blank votes	318,667	9.88	+2.92	–	–	–	–
Turnout	3,224,500	93.61	+2.30	–	–	–	–
Registered voters	3,444,766	–	–	–	–	–	–

== New South Wales ==
1928 Australian federal election: Senate, New South Wales
Party	Candidate	Votes	%	±%
Labor	1. John Dooley (elected 1); 2. James Dunn (elected 2); 3. Arthur Rae (elected 3)	604,272	53.23	+6.68
Nationalist/Country Coalition	1. Richard Orchard (Nat); 2. Percy Abbott (CP) (defeated); 3. Josiah Thomas (Nat) (defeated)	530,926	46.77	−6.68
Total formal votes		1,135,198	91.19	−2.38
Informal votes		109,720	8.81	+2.38
Turnout		1,244,918	93.21	+2.90

#	Senator	Party
1	John Dooley	Labor
2	James Dunn	Labor
3	Arthur Rae	Labor

== Victoria ==
1928 Australian federal election: Senate, Victoria
Party	Candidate	Votes	%	±%
Nationalist/Country Coalition	1. Harry Lawson (Nat) (elected 2); 2. Robert Elliott (CP) (elected 3)	430,935	50.22	−4.30
Labor	1. John Barnes (re-elected 1); 2. Edward Findley (defeated); 3. Albert Blakey	427,079	49.78	+4.30
Total formal votes		858,014	89.99	−2.38
Informal votes		95,463	10.01	+2.38
Turnout		953,477	94.74	+1.76

#	Senator	Party
1	John Barnes	Labor
2	Harry Lawson	Nationalist
3	Robert Elliott	Country

== Queensland ==
Following the death of Nationalist senator Thomas Givens in June 1928, Labor member John MacDonald was appointed by the Parliament of Queensland to fill the casual vacancy. As a result, Queensland elected four senators, with the fourth senator elected sitting the remainder of Givens' term ending on 30 June 1932.

1928 Australian federal election: Senate, Queensland
Party	Candidate	Votes	%	±%
Nationalist/Country Coalition	1. Thomas Crawford (Nat) (re-elected 1); 2. Walter Cooper (CP) (elected 4); 3. Matthew Reid (Nat) (re-elected 3); 4. Harry Foll (Nat) (re-elected 2)	238,293	60.04	+2.75
Labor	1. Robert Horn; 2. George Lawson; 3. John MacDonald (defeated); 4. John Valentine	147,351	37.13	−5.58
Independent	Harald Jensen	11,226	2.83	+2.83
Total formal votes		396,870	91.17	−2.45
Informal votes		38,428	8.83	+2.45
Turnout		435,298	93.53	+2.76

#	Senator	Party
1	Thomas Crawford	Nationalist
2	Harry Foll	Nationalist
3	Matthew Reid	Nationalist
4	Walter Cooper	Country

== Western Australia ==
1928 Australian federal election: Senate, Western Australia
Party	Candidate	Votes	%	±%
Nationalist/Country Coalition	1. Hal Colebatch (Nat) (elected 1); 2. Bertie Johnston (CP) (elected 2); 3. Walter Kingsmill (Nat) (re-elected 3)	85,171	52.93	−4.51
Labor	1. Ted Needham (defeated); 2. Ernest Barker; 3. Charles Graham (defeated)	75,735	47.07	+7.50
Total formal votes		160,906	87.70	−4.91
Informal votes		22,569	12.30	+4.91
Turnout		183,475	90.32	+0.60

#	Senator	Party
1	Hal Colebatch	Nationalist
2	Bertie Johnston	Country
3	Walter Kingsmill	Nationalist

== South Australia ==
1928 Australian federal election: Senate, South Australia
Party	Candidate	Votes	%	±%
Labor	1. John Daly (elected 1); 2. Bert Hoare (re-elected 2); 3. Mick O'Halloran (elected 3)	134,731	50.77	+5.71
Nationalist	1. John Verran (defeated); 2. Edward Lucas; 3. Albert Robinson (defeated)	107,635	40.56	−9.94
Country	Ernest Rowe	17,154	6.46	+6.46
Independent	Raphael Cilento	5,866	2.21	+2.21
Total formal votes		265,386	88.12	−5.93
Informal votes		35,793	11.88	+5.93
Turnout		301,179	94.24	+1.42

#	Senator	Party
1	John Daly	Labor
2	Bert Hoare	Labor
3	Mick O'Halloran	Labor

== Tasmania ==
1928 Australian federal election: Senate, Tasmania
Party	Candidate	Votes	%	±%
Nationalist	1. James Ogden (re-elected 1); 2. John Hayes (re-elected 2); 3. Herbert Hays (re-elected 3); 4. Andrew Lawson	56,209	62.83	+4.65
Labor	1. William Sheridan; 2. Henry Lane	33,250	37.17	−4.65
Total formal votes		89,459	84.27	−4.46
Informal votes		16,694	15.73	+4.46
Turnout		106,153	92.72	+3.98

#	Senator	Party
1	James Ogden	Nationalist
2	John Hayes	Nationalist
3	Herbert Hays	Nationalist

== See also ==
- Candidates of the 1928 Australian federal election
- 1928 Australian House of Representatives election
- Members of the Australian Senate, 1929–1932
