= Candidates of the 1928 Australian federal election =

This article provides information on candidates who ran in the 1928 Australian federal election. The election was held on 17 November 1928.

== By-elections, appointments and defections ==
=== By-elections and appointments ===
- On 6 March 1926, John Perkins (Nationalist) was elected to succeed Sir Austin Chapman (Nationalist) as the member for Eden-Monaro.
- On 26 February 1927, Ted Theodore (Labor) was elected to succeed William Mahony (Labor) as the member for Dalley.
- On 21 May 1927, Archdale Parkhill (Nationalist) was elected to succeed Sir Granville Ryrie (Nationalist) as the member for Warringah.
- On 30 August 1927, John Verran (Nationalist) was appointed as a South Australian Senator to succeed Charles McHugh (Labor).
- On 18 April 1928, Albert Robinson (Nationalist) was appointed as a South Australian Senator to succeed Sir Henry Barwell (Nationalist).
- On 5 June 1928, Albert Gardiner (Labor) was appointed as a New South Wales Senator to succeed John Grant (Labor).
- On 16 June 1928, Graham Pratten (Nationalist) was elected to succeed Herbert Pratten (Nationalist) as the member for Martin.
- On 1 August 1928, John MacDonald (Labor) was appointed as a Queensland Senator to replace Thomas Givens (Nationalist).
- On 3 September 1928, Bernard Corser (Country) was elected unopposed to succeed Edward Corser (Nationalist) as the member for Wide Bay.
- On 6 September 1928, William Lambert (Labor), the member for West Sydney, died. No by-election was held due to the proximity of the election.
- Subsequent to the election, but prior the new Senate taking its place:
  - On 18 December 1928, Richard Abbott (Country) was appointed as a Victorian Senator to replace David Andrew (Country).

=== Defections ===
- In 1925, Labor Senator James Ogden (Tasmania) was expelled from the party and joined the Nationalist Party.
- In 1928, Country MP Llewellyn Atkinson (Wilmot) defected to the Nationalist Party.

== Seat changes ==
- Senator Albert Gardiner (Independent Labor) contested Dalley.

== Retiring Members and Senators ==
=== Labor ===
- Matthew Charlton MP (Hunter, NSW)

=== Country ===
- Robert Cook MP (Indi, Vic) — forgot to nominate himself, leaving his seat to the Labor candidate unopposed.
- Senator David Andrew (Vic)

=== Independent ===
- William Watson MP (Fremantle, WA)

== House of Representatives ==
Sitting members at the time of the election are shown in bold text. Successful candidates are highlighted in the relevant colour. Where there is possible confusion, an asterisk (*) is also used.

=== New South Wales ===
| Electorate | Held by | Labor candidate | Coalition candidate | Other candidates |
|---|---|---|---|---|
| Barton | Nationalist | James Tully | **Thomas Ley** (Nat) | |
| Calare | Nationalist | James O'Donnell | **Sir Neville Howse** (Nat) | |
| Cook | Labor | **Edward Riley** | Humphrey Earl (Nat) | |
| Cowper | Country | Tom Swiney | **Earle Page** (CP) | |
| Dalley | Labor | **Ted Theodore** | Hedley Rogers (Nat) | Albert Gardiner (Ind Lab) |
| Darling | Labor | **Arthur Blakeley** | Frederick Drury (Nat) | |
| East Sydney | Labor | **John West** | Julian Simpson (Nat) | |
| Eden-Monaro | Nationalist | John Cusack | **John Perkins** (Nat) | |
| Gwydir | Country | Lou Cunningham | **Aubrey Abbott** (CP) | |
| Hume | Labor | **Parker Moloney** | William Fleming (CP); Jack Garry (Nat) | |
| Hunter | Labor | Rowley James | Ernest Carr (Nat) | Jim Brown (Ind Lab) |
| Lang | Nationalist | William Long | **Sir Elliot Johnson** (Nat) | |
| Macquarie | Nationalist | Ben Chifley | **Arthur Manning** (Nat) | |
| Martin | Nationalist | Percy Hannett | **Graham Pratten** (Nat) | |
| New England | Country | | **Victor Thompson** (CP) | |
| Newcastle | Labor | **David Watkins** | | Walter Skelton (PLP) |
| North Sydney | Nationalist | Ben Howe | **Billy Hughes** (Nat) | |
| Parkes | Nationalist | George Sherringham | **Charles Marr** (Nat) | |
| Parramatta | Nationalist | Albert Rowe | **Eric Bowden** (Nat) | |
| Reid | Labor | **Percy Coleman** | George Tomlinson (Nat) | |
| Richmond | Country | | **Roland Green** (CP) | |
| Riverina | Country | Joseph Casserly | **William Killen** (CP) | |
| Robertson | Nationalist | | **Sydney Gardner** (Nat) | |
| South Sydney | Labor | **Edward Riley** | George Baker (Nat) | |
| Warringah | Nationalist | | **Archdale Parkhill** (Nat) | |
| Wentworth | Nationalist | Bob O'Halloran | **Walter Marks** (Nat) | |
| Werriwa | Labor | **Bert Lazzarini** | Herbert Ogilvie (Nat) | |
| West Sydney | Labor | Jack Beasley | Alfred Benjamin (Nat) | |

=== Northern Territory ===
| Electorate | Held by | Labor candidate | Other candidate(s) |
|---|---|---|---|
| Northern Territory | Labor | **Harold Nelson** | Arthur Love (Ind Lab); Douglas Watts (Ind) |

=== Queensland ===
| Electorate | Held by | Labor candidate | Coalition candidate |
|---|---|---|---|
| Brisbane | Nationalist | Frank Burke | **Donald Cameron** (Nat) |
| Capricornia | Labor | **Frank Forde** | Robert Staines (CP) |
| Darling Downs | Nationalist | | **Sir Littleton Groom** (Nat) |
| Herbert | Nationalist | George Martens | **Lewis Nott** (Nat) |
| Kennedy | Nationalist | Jim Riordan | **Grosvenor Francis** (Nat) |
| Lilley | Nationalist | | **George Mackay** (Nat) |
| Maranoa | Country | Jack Reid | **James Hunter** (CP) |
| Moreton | Nationalist | | **Josiah Francis** (Nat) |
| Oxley | Nationalist | Francis Baker | **James Bayley** (Nat) |
| Wide Bay | Country | | **Bernard Corser** (CP) |

=== South Australia ===
| Electorate | Held by | Labor candidate | Coalition candidate | Independent candidate(s) |
|---|---|---|---|---|
| Adelaide | Labor | **George Edwin Yates** | George McLeay (Nat) | |
| Angas | Nationalist | Michael Woods | **Walter Parsons** (Nat) | |
| Barker | Nationalist | | **Malcolm Cameron*** (Nat); Ronald Hunt (CP) | |
| Boothby | Nationalist | John Price | **Jack Duncan-Hughes** (Nat) | |
| Grey | Labor | **Andrew Lacey** | William Blight (Nat) | |
| Hindmarsh | Labor | **Norman Makin** | Henry Dunks (Nat) | Ross Graham |
| Wakefield | Nationalist | | Maurice Collins* (CP); **Richard Foster** (Nat) | |

=== Tasmania ===
| Electorate | Held by | Labor candidate | Nationalist candidate | Independent candidate(s) |
|---|---|---|---|---|
| Bass | Nationalist | Thomas Wilson | **Syd Jackson***; William Judd | |
| Darwin | Nationalist | | **George Bell** | James Campbell |
| Denison | Nationalist | Charles Culley*; Thomas Jude | **Sir John Gellibrand** | |
| Franklin | Nationalist | | Francis Foster; **Alfred Seabrook** | William McWilliams |
| Wilmot | Nationalist | | **Llewellyn Atkinson***; Hector McFie | George Flowers |

=== Victoria ===
| Electorate | Held by | Labor candidate | Coalition candidate | Other candidates |
|---|---|---|---|---|
| Balaclava | Nationalist | | **William Watt** (Nat) | Edward Price (Ind Nat) |
| Ballaarat | Labor | **Charles McGrath** | Matthew Baird (Nat) | |
| Batman | Labor | **Frank Brennan** | Angus McDonald (Nat) | |
| Bendigo | Nationalist | James McDonald | **Geoffry Hurry*** (Nat); Cyril James (CP) | |
| Bourke | Labor | **Frank Anstey** | Leonard Smith (Nat) | |
| Corangamite | Country | Richard Crouch | **William Gibson** (CP) | |
| Corio | Nationalist | Peter Randles | **John Lister** (Nat) | |
| Echuca | Country | | **William Hill** (CP) | Frederick Churches (CPP) |
| Fawkner | Nationalist | Nicholas Roberts | **George Maxwell** (Nat) | |
| Flinders | Nationalist | Jack Holloway | **Stanley Bruce** (Nat) | Clarence Robertson (Ind Nat) |
| Gippsland | Country | | **Thomas Paterson** (CP) | George Wise (Ind Lib) |
| Henty | Nationalist | Edward Stewart | **Henry Gullett** (Nat) | |
| Indi | Country | Paul Jones | | |
| Kooyong | Nationalist | Joseph Hannan | **John Latham** (Nat) | |
| Maribyrnong | Labor | **James Fenton** | Arthur Fenton (Nat) | |
| Melbourne | Labor | **William Maloney** | Norman O'Brien (Nat) | |
| Melbourne Ports | Labor | **James Mathews** | | |
| Wannon | Nationalist | John McNeill | **Arthur Rodgers** (Nat) | |
| Wimmera | Independent | | John Harris (CP) | **Percy Stewart** (CPP) |
| Yarra | Labor | **James Scullin** | Cecil Keeley (Nat) | |

=== Western Australia ===
| Electorate | Held by | Labor candidate | Coalition candidate | Independent candidate(s) |
|---|---|---|---|---|
| Forrest | Country | Cornelius Buckley | **John Prowse** (CP) | |
| Fremantle | Independent | John Curtin | Frank Gibson (Nat) | Keith Watson |
| Kalgoorlie | Labor | **Albert Green** | | |
| Perth | Nationalist | Arthur Watts | **Edward Mann** (Nat) | John McCoo |
| Swan | Country | | **Henry Gregory** (CP) | |

== Senate ==
Sitting Senators are shown in bold text. Tickets that elected at least one Senator are highlighted in the relevant colour. Successful candidates are identified by an asterisk (*).

=== New South Wales ===
Three seats were up for election. The Labor Party was defending one seat. The Nationalist-Country Coalition was defending two seats. Nationalist Senators Charles Cox, Walter Duncan and Walter Massy-Greene were not up for re-election.

| Labor candidates | Coalition candidates |
|---|---|
| John Dooley*; James Dunn*; Arthur Rae* | **Percy Abbott** (CP); Richard Orchard (Nat); **Josiah Thomas** (Nat) |

=== Queensland ===
Four seats were up for election. One of these was a short-term vacancy caused by Nationalist Senator Thomas Givens's death; this had been held in the interim by Labor's John MacDonald. The Nationalist Party was defending four seats. Nationalist Senators Sir William Glasgow and William Thompson were not up for re-election.

| Labor candidates | Coalition candidates | Independent candidates |
|---|---|---|
| Robert Horn; George Lawson; **John MacDonald**; John Valentine | Walter Cooper* (CP); **Thomas Crawford*** (Nat); **Harry Foll*** (Nat); **Matthew Reid*** (Nat) | Harald Jensen |

=== South Australia ===
Three seats were up for election. Originally, they were held by the Labor Party, but two Nationalist Party members had been appointed to casual vacancies. Nationalist Senators Alexander McLachlan and Sir John Newlands and Country Party Senator John Chapman were not up for re-election.

| Labor candidates | Nationalist candidates | Other candidates |
|---|---|---|
| John Daly*; **Bert Hoare***; Mick O'Halloran* | Sir Edward Lucas; **Albert Robinson**; **John Verran** | Raphael Cilento (Prot); Ernest Rowe (CP) |

=== Tasmania ===
Three seats were up for election. The Nationalist Party was defending two seats. One seat had been held by the Labor Party, but Senator James Ogden had defected to the Nationalists. Nationalist Senators John Millen, Herbert Payne and Burford Sampson were not up for re-election.

| Labor candidates | Nationalist candidates |
|---|---|
| Henry Lane; William Sheridan | **John Hayes***; **Herbert Hays***; Andrew Lawson; **James Ogden*** |

=== Victoria ===
Three seats were up for election. The Labor Party was defending two seats. The Country Party was defending one seat. Nationalist Senators Harold Elliott, James Guthrie and William Plain were not up for re-election.

| Labor candidates | Coalition candidates |
|---|---|
| **John Barnes***; Albert Blakey; **Edward Findley** | Robert Elliott* (CP); Harry Lawson* (Nat) |

=== Western Australia ===
Three seats were up for election. The Labor Party was defending two seats. The Nationalist Party was defending one seat. Nationalist Senators Patrick Lynch and Sir George Pearce and Country Party Senator William Carroll were not up for re-election.

| Labor candidates | Coalition candidates |
|---|---|
| Ernest Barker; **Charles Graham**; **Ted Needham** | Sir Hal Colebatch* (Nat); Bertie Johnston* (CP); **Walter Kingsmill*** (Nat) |

== See also ==
- Members of the Australian House of Representatives, 1925–1928
- Members of the Australian House of Representatives, 1928–1929
- Members of the Australian Senate, 1926–1929
- Members of the Australian Senate, 1929–1932
- List of political parties in Australia
