= 1928 Australian House of Representatives election =

Australian federal election, 17 November 1928 House of Representatives << 1925–1929 >>
| Enrolled voters | 3,444,769 | | | | |
| Votes cast | 2,728,815 | | Turnout | 93.64 | +2.25 |
| Informal votes | 133,730 | | Informal | 4.90 | +2.54 |
Summary of votes by party
| Party | Primary votes | % | Swing | Seats | Change |
| Labor | 1,158,505 | 44.64% | –0.40% | 31 | + 8 |
| Nationalist | 1,014,522 | 39.09% | –3.37% | 29 | – 8 |
| Country | 271,686 | 10.47% | –0.27% | 13 | ± 0 |
| Country Progressive | 41,713 | 1.61% | +1.61% | 1 | + 1 |
| Independent | 108,659 | 4.19% | +2.43% | 1 | ± 0 |
| Total | 2,595,085 | | | 75 | |

This is a list of electoral division results for the Australian 1928 federal election.

== New South Wales ==
=== Barton ===
1928 Australian federal election: Barton
| Party | Candidate | Votes | % | ±% |
|---|---|---|---|---|
| Labor | James Tully | 32,316 | 56.3 | +7.3 |
| Nationalist | Thomas Ley | 25,070 | 43.7 | −7.3 |
| Total formal votes | | 57,386 | 95.4 | |
| Informal votes | | 2,768 | 4.6 | |
| Turnout | | 60,154 | 96.7 | |
| Labor gain from Nationalist | | Swing | +7.3 | |

=== Calare ===
1928 Australian federal election: Calare
| Party | Candidate | Votes | % | ±% |
|---|---|---|---|---|
| Nationalist | Sir Neville Howse | 22,673 | 60.7 | +1.6 |
| Labor | James O'Donnell | 14,664 | 39.3 | −0.3 |
| Total formal votes | | 37,337 | 95.9 | |
| Informal votes | | 1,581 | 4.1 | |
| Turnout | | 38,918 | 93.7 | |
| Nationalist hold | | Swing | +0.9 | |

=== Cook ===
1928 Australian federal election: Cook
| Party | Candidate | Votes | % | ±% |
|---|---|---|---|---|
| Labor | Edward Riley | 28,326 | 75.5 | +7.7 |
| Nationalist | Humphrey Earl | 9,197 | 24.5 | −7.7 |
| Total formal votes | | 37,523 | 94.5 | |
| Informal votes | | 2,202 | 5.5 | |
| Turnout | | 39,725 | 95.1 | |
| Labor hold | | Swing | +7.7 | |

=== Cowper ===
1928 Australian federal election: Cowper
| Party | Candidate | Votes | % | ±% |
|---|---|---|---|---|
| Country | Earle Page | 27,556 | 76.8 | +6.8 |
| Labor | Tom Swiney | 8,336 | 23.2 | −6.8 |
| Total formal votes | | 35,892 | 95.6 | |
| Informal votes | | 1,659 | 4.4 | |
| Turnout | | 37,551 | 95.7 | |
| Country hold | | Swing | +6.8 | |

=== Dalley ===
1928 Australian federal election: Dalley
| Party | Candidate | Votes | % | ±% |
|---|---|---|---|---|
| Labor | Ted Theodore | 24,328 | 64.2 | +0.1 |
| Nationalist | Hedley Rogers | 7,704 | 20.3 | −15.6 |
| Independent Labor | Albert Gardiner | 5,888 | 15.5 | +15.5 |
| Total formal votes | | 37,920 | 94.2 | |
| Informal votes | | 2,319 | 5.8 | |
| Turnout | | 40,239 | 95.7 | |
Two-party-preferred result
| Labor | Ted Theodore | | 69.3 | +5.2 |
| Nationalist | Hedley Rogers | | 30.7 | −5.2 |
| Labor hold | | Swing | +5.2 | |

=== Darling ===
1928 Australian federal election: Darling
| Party | Candidate | Votes | % | ±% |
|---|---|---|---|---|
| Labor | Arthur Blakeley | 24,056 | 70.9 | +5.4 |
| Nationalist | Frederick Drury | 9,862 | 29.1 | −5.4 |
| Total formal votes | | 33,918 | 94.7 | |
| Informal votes | | 1,881 | 5.3 | |
| Turnout | | 35,799 | 86.9 | |
| Labor hold | | Swing | +5.4 | |

=== East Sydney ===
1928 Australian federal election: East Sydney
| Party | Candidate | Votes | % | ±% |
|---|---|---|---|---|
| Labor | John West | 19,651 | 58.4 | +4.6 |
| Nationalist | Julian Simpson | 13,994 | 41.6 | −4.6 |
| Total formal votes | | 33,645 | 94.8 | |
| Informal votes | | 1,852 | 5.2 | |
| Turnout | | 35,497 | 87.9 | |
| Labor hold | | Swing | +4.6 | |

=== Eden-Monaro ===
1928 Australian federal election: Eden-Monaro
| Party | Candidate | Votes | % | ±% |
|---|---|---|---|---|
| Nationalist | John Perkins | 21,158 | 57.6 | −7.0 |
| Labor | John Cusack | 15,590 | 42.4 | +7.0 |
| Total formal votes | | 36,748 | 94.5 | |
| Informal votes | | 2,131 | 5.5 | |
| Turnout | | 38,879 | 93.5 | |
| Nationalist hold | | Swing | −7.0 | |

=== Gwydir ===
1928 Australian federal election: Gwydir
| Party | Candidate | Votes | % | ±% |
|---|---|---|---|---|
| Country | Aubrey Abbott | 18,959 | 52.3 | +21.5 |
| Labor | Lou Cunningham | 17,266 | 47.7 | +2.2 |
| Total formal votes | | 36,225 | 95.2 | |
| Informal votes | | 1,811 | 4.8 | |
| Turnout | | 38,036 | 92.1 | |
| Country hold | | Swing | −0.8 | |

=== Hume ===
1928 Australian federal election: Hume
| Party | Candidate | Votes | % | ±% |
|---|---|---|---|---|
| Labor | Parker Moloney | 20,852 | 52.7 | +2.3 |
| Country | William Fleming | 10,797 | 27.3 | +11.2 |
| Nationalist | Jack Garry | 7,906 | 20.0 | −13.5 |
| Total formal votes | | 39,555 | 97.0 | |
| Informal votes | | 1,235 | 3.0 | |
| Turnout | | 40,790 | 93.8 | |
Two-party-preferred result
| Labor | Parker Moloney | | 54.7 | +2.7 |
| Country | William Fleming | | 45.3 | −2.7 |
| Labor hold | | Swing | +2.7 | |

=== Hunter ===
1928 Australian federal election: Hunter
| Party | Candidate | Votes | % | ±% |
|---|---|---|---|---|
| Labor | Rowley James | 28,331 | 62.2 | −9.1 |
| Nationalist | Ernest Carr | 9,145 | 20.1 | −8.6 |
| Independent Labor | Jim Brown | 8,073 | 17.7 | +17.7 |
| Total formal votes | | 45,549 | 94.5 | |
| Informal votes | | 2,640 | 5.5 | |
| Turnout | | 48,189 | 95.5 | |
Two-party-preferred result
| Labor | Rowley James | | 70.6 | −0.7 |
| Nationalist | Ernest Carr | | 39.4 | +0.7 |
| Labor hold | | Swing | −0.7 | |

=== Lang ===
1928 Australian federal election: Lang
| Party | Candidate | Votes | % | ±% |
|---|---|---|---|---|
| Labor | William Long | 21,918 | 53.5 | +9.4 |
| Nationalist | Sir Elliot Johnson | 19,082 | 46.5 | −9.4 |
| Total formal votes | | 41,000 | 94.7 | |
| Informal votes | | 2,314 | 5.3 | |
| Turnout | | 43,314 | 92.9 | |
| Labor gain from Nationalist | | Swing | +9.4 | |

=== Macquarie ===
1928 Australian federal election: Macquarie
| Party | Candidate | Votes | % | ±% |
|---|---|---|---|---|
| Labor | Ben Chifley | 20,155 | 54.9 | +6.2 |
| Nationalist | Arthur Manning | 16,577 | 45.1 | −6.2 |
| Total formal votes | | 36,732 | 96.2 | |
| Informal votes | | 1,439 | 3.8 | |
| Turnout | | 38,171 | 94.5 | |
| Labor gain from Nationalist | | Swing | +6.2 | |

=== Martin ===
1928 Australian federal election: Martin
| Party | Candidate | Votes | % | ±% |
|---|---|---|---|---|
| Nationalist | Graham Pratten | 31,166 | 56.88 | −7.88 |
| Labor | Percy Hannett | 23,631 | 43.12 | +7.88 |
| Total formal votes | | 54,797 | 95.46 | –2.57 |
| Informal votes | | 2,609 | 4.54 | +2.57 |
| Turnout | | 57,406 | 94.47 | +0.63 |
| Nationalist hold | | Swing | −7.88 | |

=== New England ===
1928 Australian federal election: New England
| Party | Candidate | Votes | % | ±% |
|---|---|---|---|---|
| Country | Victor Thompson | unopposed | | |
| Country hold | | Swing | | |

=== Newcastle ===
1928 Australian federal election: Newcastle
| Party | Candidate | Votes | % | ±% |
|---|---|---|---|---|
| Labor | David Watkins | 26,952 | 57.1 | −5.4 |
| Protestant Labour | Walter Skelton | 20,212 | 42.9 | +42.9 |
| Total formal votes | | 47,164 | 95.9 | |
| Informal votes | | 2,028 | 4.1 | |
| Turnout | | 49,192 | 94.3 | |
| Labor hold | | Swing | −5.4 | |

=== North Sydney ===
1928 Australian federal election: North Sydney
| Party | Candidate | Votes | % | ±% |
|---|---|---|---|---|
| Nationalist | Billy Hughes | 32,734 | 66.2 | −5.3 |
| Labor | Ben Howe | 16,736 | 33.8 | +5.3 |
| Total formal votes | | 49,470 | 94.8 | |
| Informal votes | | 2,718 | 5.2 | |
| Turnout | | 52,188 | 94.6 | |
| Nationalist hold | | Swing | −5.3 | |

=== Parkes ===
1928 Australian federal election: Parkes
| Party | Candidate | Votes | % | ±% |
|---|---|---|---|---|
| Nationalist | Charles Marr | 28,798 | 57.4 | −5.4 |
| Labor | George Sherringham | 21,343 | 42.6 | +5.4 |
| Total formal votes | | 50,141 | 93.6 | |
| Informal votes | | 2,627 | 6.4 | |
| Turnout | | 52,768 | 93.5 | |
| Nationalist hold | | Swing | −5.4 | |

=== Parramatta ===
1928 Australian federal election: Parramatta
| Party | Candidate | Votes | % | ±% |
|---|---|---|---|---|
| Nationalist | Eric Bowden | 30,867 | 60.1 | −5.6 |
| Labor | Albert Rowe | 20,492 | 39.9 | +5.6 |
| Total formal votes | | 51,359 | 94.8 | |
| Informal votes | | 2,798 | 5.2 | |
| Turnout | | 54,157 | 93.8 | |
| Nationalist hold | | Swing | −5.6 | |

=== Reid ===
1928 Australian federal election: Reid
| Party | Candidate | Votes | % | ±% |
|---|---|---|---|---|
| Labor | Percy Coleman | 40,495 | 66.1 | +11.4 |
| Nationalist | George Tomlinson | 20,761 | 33.9 | −11.4 |
| Total formal votes | | 61,256 | 95.1 | |
| Informal votes | | 3,186 | 4.9 | |
| Turnout | | 64,442 | 94.4 | |
| Labor hold | | Swing | +11.4 | |

=== Richmond ===
1928 Australian federal election: Richmond
| Party | Candidate | Votes | % | ±% |
|---|---|---|---|---|
| Country | Roland Green | unopposed | | |
| Country hold | | Swing | | |

=== Riverina ===
1928 Australian federal election: Riverina
| Party | Candidate | Votes | % | ±% |
|---|---|---|---|---|
| Country | William Killen | 22,377 | 57.5 | +3.2 |
| Labor | Joseph Casserly | 16,538 | 42.5 | −3.2 |
| Total formal votes | | 38,915 | 94.8 | |
| Informal votes | | 2,143 | 5.2 | |
| Turnout | | 41,058 | 90.4 | |
| Country hold | | Swing | +3.2 | |

=== Robertson ===
1928 Australian federal election: Robertson
| Party | Candidate | Votes | % | ±% |
|---|---|---|---|---|
| Nationalist | Sydney Gardner | unopposed | | |
| Nationalist hold | | Swing | | |

=== South Sydney ===
1928 Australian federal election: South Sydney
| Party | Candidate | Votes | % | ±% |
|---|---|---|---|---|
| Labor | Edward Riley | 25,915 | 54.2 | +3.1 |
| Nationalist | George Baker | 21,874 | 45.8 | −3.1 |
| Total formal votes | | 47,789 | 95.4 | |
| Informal votes | | 2,297 | 4.6 | |
| Turnout | | 50,086 | 89.9 | |
| Labor hold | | Swing | +3.1 | |

=== Warringah ===
1928 Australian federal election: Warringah
| Party | Candidate | Votes | % | ±% |
|---|---|---|---|---|
| Nationalist | Archdale Parkhill | unopposed | | |
| Nationalist hold | | Swing | | |

=== Wentworth ===
1928 Australian federal election: Wentworth
| Party | Candidate | Votes | % | ±% |
|---|---|---|---|---|
| Nationalist | Walter Marks | 29,639 | 61.5 | −2.9 |
| Labor | Bob O'Halloran | 18,539 | 38.5 | +2.9 |
| Total formal votes | | 48,178 | 95.7 | |
| Informal votes | | 2,161 | 4.3 | |
| Turnout | | 50,339 | 89.7 | |
| Nationalist hold | | Swing | −2.9 | |

=== Werriwa ===
1928 Australian federal election: Werriwa
| Party | Candidate | Votes | % | ±% |
|---|---|---|---|---|
| Labor | Bert Lazzarini | 24,842 | 61.7 | +8.0 |
| Nationalist | Herbert Ogilvie | 15,407 | 38.3 | −8.0 |
| Total formal votes | | 40,249 | 95.5 | |
| Informal votes | | 1,900 | 4.5 | |
| Turnout | | 42,149 | 93.1 | |
| Labor hold | | Swing | +8.0 | |

=== West Sydney ===
1928 Australian federal election: West Sydney
| Party | Candidate | Votes | % | ±% |
|---|---|---|---|---|
| Labor | Jack Beasley | 25,286 | 81.7 | +7.7 |
| Nationalist | Alfred Benjamin | 5,649 | 18.3 | −7.7 |
| Total formal votes | | 30,935 | 94.1 | |
| Informal votes | | 1,930 | 5.9 | |
| Turnout | | 32,865 | 91.4 | |
| Labor hold | | Swing | +7.7 | |

== Victoria ==
=== Balaclava ===
1928 Australian federal election: Balaclava
| Party | Candidate | Votes | % | ±% |
|---|---|---|---|---|
| Nationalist | William Watt | 31,977 | 63.2 | −6.5 |
| Ind. Nationalist | Edward Price | 18,651 | 36.8 | +36.8 |
| Total formal votes | | 50,628 | 94.7 | |
| Informal votes | | 2,850 | 5.3 | |
| Turnout | | 53,478 | 95.1 | |
| Nationalist hold | | Swing | −6.5 | |

=== Ballaarat ===
1928 Australian federal election: Ballaarat
| Party | Candidate | Votes | % | ±% |
|---|---|---|---|---|
| Labor | Charles McGrath | 19,528 | 52.6 | +1.3 |
| Nationalist | Matthew Baird | 17,616 | 47.4 | −1.3 |
| Total formal votes | | 37,144 | 98.2 | |
| Informal votes | | 682 | 1.8 | |
| Turnout | | 37,826 | 97.1 | |
| Labor hold | | Swing | +1.3 | |

=== Batman ===
1928 Australian federal election: Batman
| Party | Candidate | Votes | % | ±% |
|---|---|---|---|---|
| Labor | Frank Brennan | 37,947 | 63.8 | +4.8 |
| Nationalist | Angus McDonald | 21,512 | 36.2 | −4.8 |
| Total formal votes | | 59,459 | 96.5 | |
| Informal votes | | 2,170 | 3.5 | |
| Turnout | | 61,629 | 91.8 | |
| Labor hold | | Swing | +4.8 | |

=== Bendigo ===
1928 Australian federal election: Bendigo
| Party | Candidate | Votes | % | ±% |
|---|---|---|---|---|
| Labor | James McDonald | 15,849 | 42.4 | −4.1 |
| Nationalist | Geoffry Hurry | 14,074 | 37.6 | −15.9 |
| Country | Cyril James | 7,489 | 20.0 | +20.0 |
| Total formal votes | | 37,412 | 97.8 | |
| Informal votes | | 855 | 2.2 | |
| Turnout | | 38,267 | 95.7 | |
Two-party-preferred result
| Nationalist | Geoffry Hurry | 19,882 | 53.1 | −0.4 |
| Labor | James McDonald | 17,530 | 46.9 | +0.4 |
| Nationalist hold | | Swing | −0.4 | |

=== Bourke ===
1928 Australian federal election: Bourke
| Party | Candidate | Votes | % | ±% |
|---|---|---|---|---|
| Labor | Frank Anstey | 36,835 | 68.7 | +6.2 |
| Nationalist | Leonard Smith | 16,797 | 31.3 | −6.2 |
| Total formal votes | | 53,632 | 95.9 | |
| Informal votes | | 2,276 | 4.1 | |
| Turnout | | 55,908 | 95.5 | |
| Labor hold | | Swing | +6.2 | |

=== Corangamite ===
1928 Australian federal election: Corangamite
| Party | Candidate | Votes | % | ±% |
|---|---|---|---|---|
| Country | William Gibson | 20,501 | 53.0 | −2.5 |
| Labor | Richard Crouch | 18,211 | 47.0 | +2.5 |
| Total formal votes | | 38,712 | 97.6 | |
| Informal votes | | 959 | 2.4 | |
| Turnout | | 39,671 | 95.4 | |
| Country hold | | Swing | −2.5 | |

=== Corio ===
1928 Australian federal election: Corio
| Party | Candidate | Votes | % | ±% |
|---|---|---|---|---|
| Nationalist | John Lister | 27,497 | 58.5 | +1.8 |
| Labor | Peter Randles | 19,500 | 41.5 | −1.8 |
| Total formal votes | | 46,997 | 97.5 | |
| Informal votes | | 1,223 | 2.5 | |
| Turnout | | 48,220 | 93.8 | |
| Nationalist hold | | Swing | +1.8 | |

=== Echuca ===
1928 Australian federal election: Echuca
| Party | Candidate | Votes | % | ±% |
|---|---|---|---|---|
| Country | William Hill | 23,265 | 60.0 | −5.3 |
| Country Progressive | Frederick Churches | 15,486 | 40.0 | +40.0 |
| Total formal votes | | 38,751 | 96.8 | |
| Informal votes | | 1,263 | 3.2 | |
| Turnout | | 40,014 | 94.4 | |
| Country hold | | Swing | −5.3 | |

=== Fawkner ===
1928 Australian federal election: Fawkner
| Party | Candidate | Votes | % | ±% |
|---|---|---|---|---|
| Nationalist | George Maxwell | 25,388 | 61.7 | +2.3 |
| Labor | Nicholas Roberts | 15,731 | 38.3 | −2.3 |
| Total formal votes | | 41,119 | 96.8 | |
| Informal votes | | 1,356 | 3.2 | |
| Turnout | | 42,475 | 92.1 | |
| Nationalist hold | | Swing | +2.3 | |

=== Flinders ===
1928 Australian federal election: Flinders
| Party | Candidate | Votes | % | ±% |
|---|---|---|---|---|
| Nationalist | Stanley Bruce | 34,823 | 59.4 | −3.3 |
| Labor | Jack Holloway | 22,372 | 38.2 | +0.9 |
| Ind. Nationalist | Clarence Robertson | 1,447 | 2.5 | +2.5 |
| Total formal votes | | 58,642 | 96.6 | |
| Informal votes | | 2,073 | 3.4 | |
| Turnout | | 60,715 | 95.0 | |
Two-party-preferred result
| Nationalist | Stanley Bruce | | 60.7 | −1.9 |
| Labor | Jack Holloway | | 39.3 | +1.9 |
| Nationalist hold | | Swing | −1.9 | |

=== Gippsland ===
1928 Australian federal election: Gippsland
| Party | Candidate | Votes | % | ±% |
|---|---|---|---|---|
| Country | Thomas Paterson | 24,100 | 57.7 | +13.1 |
| Independent Liberal | George Wise | 17,643 | 42.3 | +19.5 |
| Total formal votes | | 41,743 | 97.4 | |
| Informal votes | | 1,101 | 2.6 | |
| Turnout | | 42,844 | 95.4 | |
| Country hold | | Swing | −5.4 | |

=== Henty ===
1928 Australian federal election: Henty
| Party | Candidate | Votes | % | ±% |
|---|---|---|---|---|
| Nationalist | Henry Gullett | 45,489 | 66.6 | +15.1 |
| Labor | Edward Stewart | 22,839 | 33.4 | +3.7 |
| Total formal votes | | 68,328 | 96.8 | |
| Informal votes | | 2,249 | 3.2 | |
| Turnout | | 70,577 | 94.4 | |
| Nationalist hold | | Swing | +5.7 | |

=== Indi ===
1928 Australian federal election: Indi
| Party | Candidate | Votes | % | ±% |
|---|---|---|---|---|
| Labor | Paul Jones | unopposed | | |
| Labor gain from Country | | Swing | | |

=== Kooyong ===
1928 Australian federal election: Kooyong
| Party | Candidate | Votes | % | ±% |
|---|---|---|---|---|
| Nationalist | John Latham | 39,988 | 66.5 | −1.2 |
| Labor | Joseph Hannan | 20,124 | 33.5 | +1.2 |
| Total formal votes | | 60,112 | 97.1 | |
| Informal votes | | 1,773 | 2.9 | |
| Turnout | | 61,885 | 95.5 | |
| Nationalist hold | | Swing | −1.2 | |

=== Maribyrnong ===
1928 Australian federal election: Maribyrnong
| Party | Candidate | Votes | % | ±% |
|---|---|---|---|---|
| Labor | James Fenton | 31,022 | 59.9 | +0.4 |
| Nationalist | Arthur Fenton | 20,765 | 40.1 | −0.4 |
| Total formal votes | | 51,787 | 97.0 | |
| Informal votes | | 1,614 | 3.0 | |
| Turnout | | 53,401 | 97.6 | |
| Labor hold | | Swing | +0.4 | |

=== Melbourne ===
1928 Australian federal election: Melbourne
| Party | Candidate | Votes | % | ±% |
|---|---|---|---|---|
| Labor | William Maloney | 27,532 | 74.4 | +7.4 |
| Nationalist | Norman O'Brien | 9,457 | 25.6 | −7.4 |
| Total formal votes | | 36,989 | 95.7 | |
| Informal votes | | 1,667 | 4.3 | |
| Turnout | | 38,656 | 96.5 | |
| Labor hold | | Swing | +7.4 | |

=== Melbourne Ports ===
1928 Australian federal election: Melbourne Ports
| Party | Candidate | Votes | % | ±% |
|---|---|---|---|---|
| Labor | James Mathews | unopposed | | |
| Labor hold | | Swing | | |

=== Wannon ===
1928 Australian federal election: Wannon
| Party | Candidate | Votes | % | ±% |
|---|---|---|---|---|
| Nationalist | Arthur Rodgers | 21,016 | 52.8 | +10.3 |
| Labor | John McNeill | 18,807 | 47.2 | +4.9 |
| Total formal votes | | 39,823 | 98.2 | |
| Informal votes | | 742 | 1.8 | |
| Turnout | | 40,565 | 95.7 | |
| Nationalist hold | | Swing | −1.2 | |

=== Wimmera ===
1928 Australian federal election: Wimmera
| Party | Candidate | Votes | % | ±% |
|---|---|---|---|---|
| Country Progressive | Percy Stewart | 26,227 | 58.4 | −30.6 |
| Country | John Harris | 18,716 | 41.6 | +41.6 |
| Total formal votes | | 44,943 | 97.6 | |
| Informal votes | | 1,090 | 2.4 | |
| Turnout | | 46,033 | 92.5 | |
| Country Progressive gain from Independent Country | | Swing | −30.6 | |

=== Yarra ===
1928 Australian federal election: Yarra
| Party | Candidate | Votes | % | ±% |
|---|---|---|---|---|
| Labor | James Scullin | 28,495 | 74.8 | +0.0 |
| Nationalist | Cecil Keeley | 9,618 | 25.2 | +0.0 |
| Total formal votes | | 38,113 | 94.7 | |
| Informal votes | | 2,115 | 5.3 | |
| Turnout | | 40,228 | 93.6 | |
| Labor hold | | Swing | +0.0 | |

== Queensland ==
=== Brisbane ===
1928 Australian federal election: Brisbane
| Party | Candidate | Votes | % | ±% |
|---|---|---|---|---|
| Nationalist | Donald Cameron | 21,563 | 56.7 | +1.6 |
| Labor | Frank Burke | 16,500 | 43.3 | −0.8 |
| Total formal votes | | 38,063 | 93.6 | |
| Informal votes | | 2,592 | 6.4 | |
| Turnout | | 40,655 | 92.6 | |
| Nationalist hold | | Swing | +1.2 | |

=== Capricornia ===
1928 Australian federal election: Capricornia
| Party | Candidate | Votes | % | ±% |
|---|---|---|---|---|
| Labor | Frank Forde | 23,376 | 52.5 | +0.6 |
| Country | Robert Staines | 21,114 | 47.5 | −0.6 |
| Total formal votes | | 44,490 | 96.3 | |
| Informal votes | | 1,728 | 3.7 | |
| Turnout | | 46,218 | 93.8 | |
| Labor hold | | Swing | +0.6 | |

=== Darling Downs ===
1928 Australian federal election: Darling Downs
| Party | Candidate | Votes | % | ±% |
|---|---|---|---|---|
| Nationalist | Sir Littleton Groom | unopposed | | |
| Nationalist hold | | Swing | | |

=== Herbert ===
1928 Australian federal election: Herbert
| Party | Candidate | Votes | % | ±% |
|---|---|---|---|---|
| Labor | George Martens | 25,462 | 50.2 | +0.5 |
| Nationalist | Lewis Nott | 25,308 | 49.8 | −0.5 |
| Total formal votes | | 50,770 | 93.9 | |
| Informal votes | | 3,312 | 6.1 | |
| Turnout | | 54,082 | 93.5 | |
| Labor gain from Nationalist | | Swing | +0.5 | |

=== Kennedy ===
1928 Australian federal election: Kennedy
| Party | Candidate | Votes | % | ±% |
|---|---|---|---|---|
| Nationalist | Grosvenor Francis | 14,336 | 52.4 | −47.6 |
| Labor | Jim Riordan | 13,041 | 47.6 | +47.6 |
| Total formal votes | | 27,377 | 94.7 | |
| Informal votes | | 1,527 | 5.3 | |
| Turnout | | 28,904 | 88.5 | |
| Nationalist hold | | Swing | −47.6 | |

=== Lilley ===
1928 Australian federal election: Lilley
| Party | Candidate | Votes | % | ±% |
|---|---|---|---|---|
| Nationalist | George Mackay | unopposed | | |
| Nationalist hold | | Swing | | |

=== Maranoa ===
1928 Australian federal election: Maranoa
| Party | Candidate | Votes | % | ±% |
|---|---|---|---|---|
| Country | James Hunter | 16,837 | 58.3 | +5.7 |
| Labor | Jack Reid | 12,024 | 41.7 | −5.7 |
| Total formal votes | | 28,861 | 95.7 | |
| Informal votes | | 1,289 | 4.3 | |
| Turnout | | 30,150 | 90.6 | |
| Country hold | | Swing | +5.7 | |

=== Moreton ===
1928 Australian federal election: Moreton
| Party | Candidate | Votes | % | ±% |
|---|---|---|---|---|
| Nationalist | Josiah Francis | unopposed | | |
| Nationalist hold | | Swing | | |

=== Oxley ===
1928 Australian federal election: Oxley
| Party | Candidate | Votes | % | ±% |
|---|---|---|---|---|
| Nationalist | James Bayley | 26,223 | 53.7 | −2.0 |
| Labor | Francis Baker | 22,579 | 46.3 | +2.0 |
| Total formal votes | | 48,802 | 93.5 | |
| Informal votes | | 3,376 | 6.5 | |
| Turnout | | 52,178 | 93.8 | |
| Nationalist hold | | Swing | −2.0 | |

=== Wide Bay ===
1928 Australian federal election: Wide Bay
| Party | Candidate | Votes | % | ±% |
|---|---|---|---|---|
| Country | Bernard Corser | unopposed | | |
| Country hold | | Swing | | |

== South Australia ==
=== Adelaide ===
1928 Australian federal election: Adelaide
| Party | Candidate | Votes | % | ±% |
|---|---|---|---|---|
| Labor | George Edwin Yates | 20,410 | 55.9 | +5.0 |
| Nationalist | George McLeay | 16,114 | 44.1 | −5.0 |
| Total formal votes | | 36,524 | 89.9 | |
| Informal votes | | 4,099 | 10.1 | |
| Turnout | | 40,623 | 92.1 | |
| Labor hold | | Swing | +5.0 | |

=== Angas ===
1928 Australian federal election: Angas
| Party | Candidate | Votes | % | ±% |
|---|---|---|---|---|
| Nationalist | Walter Parsons | 25,372 | 59.4 | +9.1 |
| Labor | Michael Woods | 17,325 | 40.6 | −9.1 |
| Total formal votes | | 42,697 | 90.1 | |
| Informal votes | | 4,689 | 9.9 | |
| Turnout | | 47,386 | 95.3 | |
| Nationalist hold | | Swing | +9.1 | |

=== Barker ===
1928 Australian federal election: Barker
| Party | Candidate | Votes | % | ±% |
|---|---|---|---|---|
| Nationalist | Malcolm Cameron | 21,883 | 52.6 | −9.0 |
| Country | Ronald Hunt | 19,699 | 47.4 | +47.4 |
| Total formal votes | | 41,582 | 90.2 | |
| Informal votes | | 4,523 | 9.8 | |
| Turnout | | 46,105 | 95.4 | |
| Nationalist hold | | Swing | −9.0 | |

=== Boothby ===
1928 Australian federal election: Boothby
| Party | Candidate | Votes | % | ±% |
|---|---|---|---|---|
| Labor | John Price | 20,666 | 50.1 | +7.7 |
| Nationalist | Jack Duncan-Hughes | 20,582 | 49.9 | −7.7 |
| Total formal votes | | 41,248 | 91.4 | |
| Informal votes | | 3,886 | 8.6 | |
| Turnout | | 45,134 | 93.8 | |
| Labor gain from Nationalist | | Swing | +7.7 | |

=== Grey ===
1928 Australian federal election: Grey
| Party | Candidate | Votes | % | ±% |
|---|---|---|---|---|
| Labor | Andrew Lacey | 17,904 | 55.8 | +3.2 |
| Nationalist | William Blight | 14,174 | 44.2 | −3.2 |
| Total formal votes | | 32,078 | 91.9 | |
| Informal votes | | 2,839 | 8.1 | |
| Turnout | | 34,917 | 92.0 | |
| Labor hold | | Swing | +3.2 | |

=== Hindmarsh ===
1928 Australian federal election: Hindmarsh
| Party | Candidate | Votes | % | ±% |
|---|---|---|---|---|
| Labor | Norman Makin | 33,241 | 70.6 | +5.4 |
| Nationalist | Henry Dunks | 8,748 | 18.6 | −16.2 |
| Independent | Ross Graham | 5,081 | 10.8 | +10.8 |
| Total formal votes | | 47,070 | 91.1 | |
| Informal votes | | 4,626 | 8.9 | |
| Turnout | | 51,696 | 94.7 | |
Two-party-preferred result
| Labor | Norman Makin | | 73.3 | +8.1 |
| Nationalist | Henry Dunks | | 26.7 | −8.1 |
| Labor hold | | Swing | +8.1 | |

=== Wakefield ===
1928 Australian federal election: Wakefield
| Party | Candidate | Votes | % | ±% |
|---|---|---|---|---|
| Country | Maurice Collins | 18,813 | 59.6 | +59.6 |
| Nationalist | Richard Foster | 12,755 | 40.4 | −24.4 |
| Total formal votes | | 31,568 | 89.4 | |
| Informal votes | | 3,750 | 10.6 | |
| Turnout | | 35,318 | 96.1 | |
| Country gain from Nationalist | | Swing | +24.4 | |

== Western Australia ==
=== Forrest ===
1928 Australian federal election: Forrest
| Party | Candidate | Votes | % | ±% |
|---|---|---|---|---|
| Country | John Prowse | 21,463 | 60.4 | −0.5 |
| Labor | Cornelius Buckley | 14,049 | 39.6 | +0.5 |
| Total formal votes | | 35,512 | 96.4 | |
| Informal votes | | 1,309 | 3.6 | |
| Turnout | | 36,821 | 90.3 | |
| Country hold | | Swing | −0.5 | |

=== Fremantle ===
1928 Australian federal election: Fremantle
| Party | Candidate | Votes | % | ±% |
|---|---|---|---|---|
| Labor | John Curtin | 19,433 | 49.2 | +7.3 |
| Nationalist | Frank Gibson | 11,402 | 28.8 | +28.8 |
| Independent | Keith Watson | 8,697 | 22.0 | +22.0 |
| Total formal votes | | 39,532 | 96.9 | |
| Informal votes | | 1,253 | 3.1 | |
| Turnout | | 40,785 | 93.0 | |
Two-party-preferred result
| Labor | John Curtin | 20,589 | 52.1 | +10.2 |
| Nationalist | Frank Gibson | 18,943 | 47.9 | +47.9 |
| Labor gain from Independent | | Swing | +10.2 | |

=== Kalgoorlie ===
1928 Australian federal election: Kalgoorlie
| Party | Candidate | Votes | % | ±% |
|---|---|---|---|---|
| Labor | Albert Green | unopposed | | |
| Labor hold | | Swing | | |

=== Perth ===
1928 Australian federal election: Perth
| Party | Candidate | Votes | % | ±% |
|---|---|---|---|---|
| Nationalist | Edward Mann | 22,002 | 61.8 | −1.0 |
| Labor | Arthur Watts | 12,082 | 34.0 | −3.2 |
| Independent | John McCoo | 1,499 | 4.2 | +4.2 |
| Total formal votes | | 35,583 | 95.2 | |
| Informal votes | | 1,803 | 4.8 | |
| Turnout | | 37,386 | 91.8 | |
Two-party-preferred result
| Nationalist | Edward Mann | | 64.9 | +2.1 |
| Labor | Arthur Watts | | 35.1 | −2.1 |
| Nationalist hold | | Swing | +2.1 | |

=== Swan ===
1928 Australian federal election: Swan
| Party | Candidate | Votes | % | ±% |
|---|---|---|---|---|
| Country | Henry Gregory | unopposed | | |
| Country hold | | Swing | | |

== Tasmania ==
=== Bass ===
1928 Australian federal election: Bass
| Party | Candidate | Votes | % | ±% |
|---|---|---|---|---|
| Labor | Thomas Wilson | 8,621 | 42.6 | −0.4 |
| Nationalist | Syd Jackson | 5,991 | 29.6 | +0.3 |
| Nationalist | William Judd | 5,606 | 27.7 | +27.7 |
| Total formal votes | | 20,218 | 95.0 | |
| Informal votes | | 1,067 | 5.0 | |
| Turnout | | 21,285 | 92.5 | |
Two-party-preferred result
| Nationalist | Syd Jackson | 10,736 | 53.1 | −5.2 |
| Labor | Thomas Wilson | 9,482 | 46.9 | +5.2 |
| Nationalist hold | | Swing | −5.2 | |

=== Darwin ===
1928 Australian federal election: Darwin
| Party | Candidate | Votes | % | ±% |
|---|---|---|---|---|
| Nationalist | George Bell | 14,880 | 71.9 | +9.4 |
| Independent | James Campbell | 5,813 | 28.1 | +28.1 |
| Total formal votes | | 20,693 | 93.7 | |
| Informal votes | | 1,385 | 6.3 | |
| Turnout | | 22,078 | 94.0 | |
| Nationalist hold | | Swing | +10.6 | |

=== Denison ===
1928 Australian federal election: Denison
| Party | Candidate | Votes | % | ±% |
|---|---|---|---|---|
| Nationalist | Sir John Gellibrand | 9,486 | 47.6 | −4.6 |
| Labor | Charles Culley | 7,824 | 39.3 | +4.6 |
| Labor | Thomas Jude | 2,618 | 13.1 | +13.1 |
| Total formal votes | | 19,928 | 94.4 | |
| Informal votes | | 1,171 | 5.6 | |
| Turnout | | 21,099 | 92.5 | |
Two-party-preferred result
| Labor | Charles Culley | 10,028 | 50.3 | +2.5 |
| Nationalist | Sir John Gellibrand | 9,900 | 49.7 | −2.5 |
| Labor gain from Nationalist | | Swing | +2.5 | |

=== Franklin ===
1928 Australian federal election: Franklin
| Party | Candidate | Votes | % | ±% |
|---|---|---|---|---|
| Nationalist | Alfred Seabrook | 9,173 | 44.8 | −6.3 |
| Independent | William McWilliams | 9,121 | 44.5 | +44.5 |
| Nationalist | Francis Foster | 2,195 | 10.7 | +10.7 |
| Total formal votes | | 20,489 | 93.7 | |
| Informal votes | | 1,380 | 6.3 | |
| Turnout | | 21,869 | 91.7 | |
Two-party-preferred result
| Independent | William McWilliams | 10,567 | 51.6 | +51.6 |
| Nationalist | Alfred Seabrook | 9,922 | 48.4 | −7.2 |
| Independent gain from Nationalist | | Swing | +7.2 | |

=== Wilmot ===
1928 Australian federal election: Wilmot
| Party | Candidate | Votes | % | ±% |
|---|---|---|---|---|
| Nationalist | Llewellyn Atkinson | 7,791 | 43.3 | −0.1 |
| Independent | George Flowers | 6,534 | 36.3 | +36.3 |
| Nationalist | Hector McFie | 3,658 | 20.3 | +20.3 |
| Total formal votes | | 17,983 | 90.7 | |
| Informal votes | | 1,839 | 9.3 | |
| Turnout | | 19,822 | 92.8 | |
Two-party-preferred result
| Nationalist | Llewellyn Atkinson | 9,814 | 54.6 | −2.4 |
| Independent | George Flowers | 8,169 | 45.4 | +2.4 |
| Nationalist gain from Country | | Swing | −2.4 | |

== Northern Territory ==
=== Northern Territory ===
1928 Australian federal election: Northern Territory
| Party | Candidate | Votes | % | ±% |
|---|---|---|---|---|
| Labor | Harold Nelson | 902 | 68.1 | +5.7 |
| Independent | Douglas Watts | 250 | 18.9 | +18.9 |
| Independent Labor | Arthur Love | 173 | 13.1 | +13.1 |
| Total formal votes | | 1,325 | 96.7 | |
| Informal votes | | 45 | 3.3 | |
| Turnout | | 1,370 | 65.3 | |
Two-party-preferred result
| Labor | Harold Nelson | | 75.2 | +12.8 |
| Independent | Douglas Watts | | 24.8 | +24.8 |
| Labor hold | | Swing | +12.8 | |

== See also ==
- Candidates of the 1928 Australian federal election
- Members of the Australian House of Representatives, 1928–1929
