= John Mann (Australian politician) =

Australian politician

Member of the Queensland Legislative Assembly for Cairns
- In office 27 August 1904 – 29 April 1912
- Preceded by: James Lyons
- Succeeded by: William McCormack

Personal details
- Born: John Mann; 1869 Ross, Scotland
- Died: 1 January 1939 (aged 69–70) Cairns, Queensland, Australia
- Resting place: Martyn St Cemetery
- Party: Kidstonites
- Other political affiliations: Labor, Ministerial
- Spouse(s): Janet King (m.1910 d.1921), Amy Stuart (m.1937)
- Occupation: Farmer

John Mann (1869 – 1 January 1939) was an Australian politician. He was the member for Cairns in the Legislative Assembly of Queensland from 1904 to 1912. Initially a member of the Labor Party, he followed Premier William Kidston out of the party in 1907 into what became known as the "Kidston Party".

Mann died in Cairns in 1939 and was buried in the Martyn St Cemetery.

Parliament of Queensland
Preceded by James Lyons	Member for Cairns; 1904–1912	Succeeded by William McCormack
