= James Lyons (Queensland politician) =

Australian politician

James Lyons (17 March 1842 – 27 July 1915) was an Irish-born Australian politician.

He was born in County Leitrim to Myles Lyons and Bridget, née Cunningham. James left Ireland on 11 September 1855 aboard the emigrant ship Bee and arrived in New South Wales, Australia on 6 January 1856. He moved to Queensland, where he worked as a miner and timber hauler before establishing a sawmill in Cairns in 1881. He married Ellen Murphy, with whom he had nine children. He was a long-serving alderman on Cairns Shire Council, with a period as mayor from 1895 to 1896. He represented Cairns in the Queensland Legislative Assembly from 1902 to 1904 as a conservative ministerialist. In 1906 he was a founder of the Cairns Stock Exchange. He died in Cairns in 1915.

Parliament of Queensland
| Preceded by Thomas Givens | Member for Cairns; 1902–1904 | Succeeded by John Mann |
