= Members of the Australian Senate, 1929–1932 =

Senate composition at 1 July 1929
Coalition (28) - (10 seat majority) (Note: The Coalition government was defeated by Labor at the October 1929 House of Representatives election)
Nationalist (24) (Note: In May 1931 the Nationalist party merged with pro-Joseph Lyons Labor defectors to form the United Australia Party.) (Note: UAP Senator Walter Duncan resigned on 1 December 1931 and was replaced by Lang Labor member Patrick Mooney.)
Country Party (4)

Labor (8) - (10 seat minority) (Note: In 1931 2 NSW Senators walked out of the Labor party to join Lang Labor)

Changes in composition

This is a list of members of the Australian Senate from 1929 to 1932. Half of its members were elected at the 14 November 1925 election and had terms starting on 1 July 1926 and finishing on 30 June 1932; the other half were elected at the 17 November 1928 election and had terms starting on 1 July 1929 and finishing on 30 June 1935. The process for filling casual vacancies was complex. While senators were elected for a six-year term, people appointed to a casual vacancy only held office until the earlier of the next election for the House of Representatives or the Senate.

The government changed during the Senate term as the Coalition of the Nationalist Party led by Prime Minister of Australia Stanley Bruce and the Country Party led by Earle Page lost the confidence of the House of Representatives and called an election for October 1929. The Labor Party, led by James Scullin, won the election with a large majority. This was the first time in which an election for the House of Representatives was held without an election for the Senate. Section 13 of the Constitution requires an election to occur within one year of the expiry of senate terms and the terms of senators elected in 1925 were not due to expire until 1932.

In 1931 five Labor members in the House of Representatives split from the Scullin government in opposition to its economic policies on the Great Depression and joined the Nationalist Party and three conservative independents in the House to form the United Australia Party (UAP). Subsequently, some New South Wales members and senators were expelled from the Labor Party for their support of New South Wales Premier Jack Lang's policy of repudiating foreign debt and formed the Australian Labor Party (New South Wales)—known as Lang Labor—and later voted with the UAP to defeat the Scullin government, leading to the 1931 election.

== List of members ==
Senator	Party	State	Term ending	Years in office
John Barnes	Labor	Victoria	1935	1913–1920, 1923–1935
Tom Brennan (Note: Nationalist Senator Harold Elliott died on 23 March 1931; UAP member Tom Brennan was appointed on 12 May to replace him for the remainder of his term finishing on 30 June 1932.)	United Australia	Victoria	1932 (Note: Appointed to a casual vacancy and only held office until the earlier of the next election for the House of Representatives or the Senate.)	1931–1938
William Carroll	Country	Western Australia	1932	1926–1936
John Chapman (Note: Labor Senator John Chapman died on 14 March 1931; Labor member Harry Kneebone was appointed on 1 April to replace him until the 19 December 1931 election when he was defeated by UAP candidate Jack Duncan-Hughes for the remainder of his term finishing on 30 June 1932.)	Nationalist /United Australia	South Australia	1932	1926–1931
Hal Colebatch	Nationalist /United Australia	Western Australia	1935	1929–1933
Walter Cooper	Country	Queensland	1932	1928–1932, 1935–1968
Charles Cox	Nationalist /United Australia	New South Wales	1932	1920–1938
Thomas Crawford	Nationalist /United Australia	Queensland	1935	1917–1947
John Daly	Labor	South Australia	1935	1928–1935
John Dooley	Labor	New South Wales	1935	1928–1935
Walter Duncan (Note: UAP Senator Walter Duncan resigned on 1 December 1931; Lang Labor member Patrick Mooney was appointed on 23 December to replace him for the remainder of his term finishing on 30 June 1932.)	Nationalist / Independent / Australian / United Australia (Note: Duncan was expelled from the Nationalist Party on 19 November 1929 along with three other dissident Nationalists in the House of Representatives. Massy-Greene resigned from the Nationalist Party on the same date in protest at the expulsions. Duncan and Massy-Greene joined the new Australian Party on 5 December 1929. Massy-Greene resigned from the Australian Party on 26 December 1930 to rejoin the Nationalist Party, with both Duncan and Massy-Greene joining the United Australia Party along with other Nationalist senators in May 1931.)	New South Wales	1932	1920–1931
Jack Duncan-Hughes	United Australia	South Australia	1932	1931–38
James Dunn	Labor/Lang Labor	New South Wales	1935	1929–1935
Harold Elliott	Nationalist	Victoria	1932	1920–1931
Robert Elliott	Country	Victoria	1935	1929–1935
Harry Foll	Nationalist /United Australia	Queensland	1935	1917–1947
William Glasgow	Nationalist /United Australia	Queensland	1932	1920–1932
Charles Grant (Note: UAP Senator James Ogden died on 5 February 1932; UAP member and former Senator Charles Grant was appointed on 3 March to replace him with his term expiring at the September 1934 election, when he was re-elected for the balance of the term expiring on 30 June 1935 and a six year term expiring on 30 June 1941.)	United Australia	Tasmania	1934	1925, 1932–1941
James Guthrie	Nationalist /United Australia	Victoria	1932	1920–1938
John Hayes	Nationalist /United Australia	Tasmania	1935	1923–1947
Herbert Hays	Nationalist /United Australia	Tasmania	1935	1923–1947
Bert Hoare	Labor	South Australia	1935	1922–1935
Bertie Johnston	Country	Western Australia	1935	1929–1942
Walter Kingsmill	Nationalist /United Australia	Western Australia	1935	1923–1935
Harry Kneebone	Labor	South Australia	1931	1931
Harry Lawson	Nationalist /United Australia	Victoria	1935	1929–1935
Patrick Lynch	Nationalist /United Australia	Western Australia	1932	1907–1938
Walter Massy-Greene	Nationalist / Independent / Australian / United Australia	New South Wales	1932	1923–1925, 1926–1938
Alexander McLachlan	Nationalist /United Australia	South Australia	1932	1926–1944
John Millen	Nationalist /United Australia	Tasmania	1932	1920–1938
Patrick Mooney	Lang Labor	New South Wales	1932	1931–1932
John Newlands	Nationalist /United Australia	South Australia	1932	1913–1932
James Ogden	United Australia	Tasmania	1935	1923–1932
Mick O'Halloran	Labor	South Australia	1935	1928–1935
Herbert Payne	Nationalist /United Australia	Tasmania	1932	1920–1938
Sir George Pearce (Note: Father of the Senate)	Nationalist /United Australia	Western Australia	1932	1901–1938
William Plain	Nationalist /United Australia	Victoria	1932	1917–1923, 1925–1938
Arthur Rae	Labor/Lang Labor	New South Wales	1935	1910–1914, 1929–1935
Matthew Reid	Nationalist /United Australia	Queensland	1935	1917–1935
Burford Sampson	Nationalist /United Australia	Tasmania	1932	1925–1938, 1941–1947
William Thompson	Nationalist /United Australia	Queensland	1932	1922–1932
