= 1928 Australian Labor Party leadership election =

1928 Australian Labor Party Leadership election
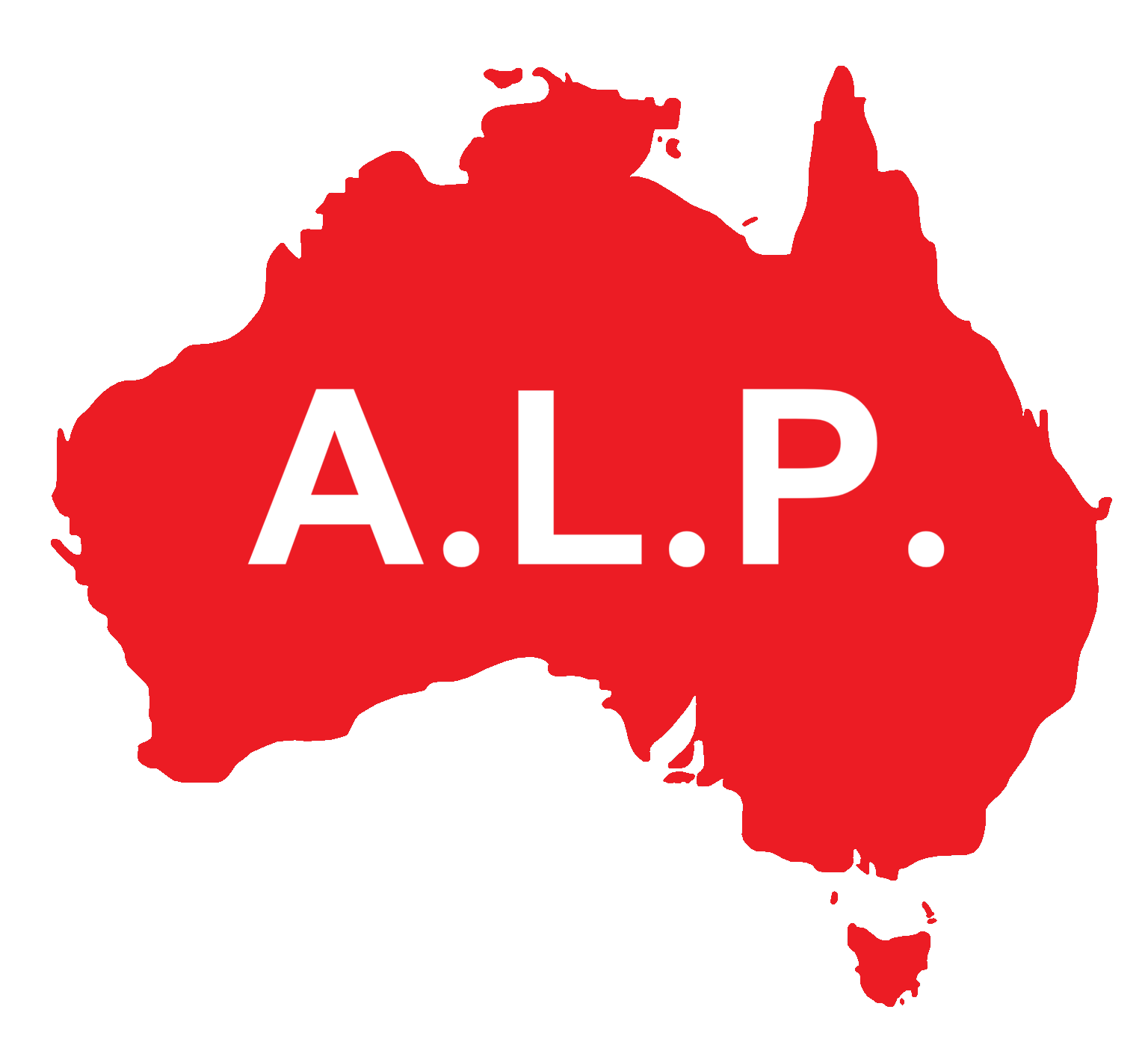
- 26 April 1928
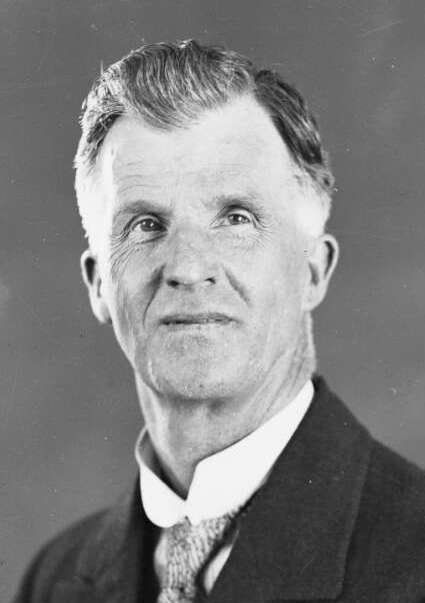
Candidate	James Scullin
Caucus vote	Unopposed
Leader before election
Matthew Charlton
Elected Leader
James Scullin

A leadership election in the Australian Labor Party, then the opposition party in the Parliament of Australia, was held on 26 April 1928. It saw the election of Leader James Scullin as leader following the retirement of sitting leader Matthew Charlton.

== Background ==
Scullin, then deputy-leader of the ALP, was elected as Charlton's successor. As was traditional, it was publicly reported that Scullin had been elected as leader unopposed. However, Ted Theodore and George Yates also reportedly contested the leadership ballot, with Scullin winning by "a substantial but undisclosed majority".

In the election for deputy leader, Arthur Blakeley narrowly defeated Theodore for the position. Norman Makin was elected secretary of the party, to fill the vacancy caused by Blakeley's elevation to deputy leader.

== See also ==
- 1928 Australian federal election
