= John MacDonald (Australian politician) =

Australian politician

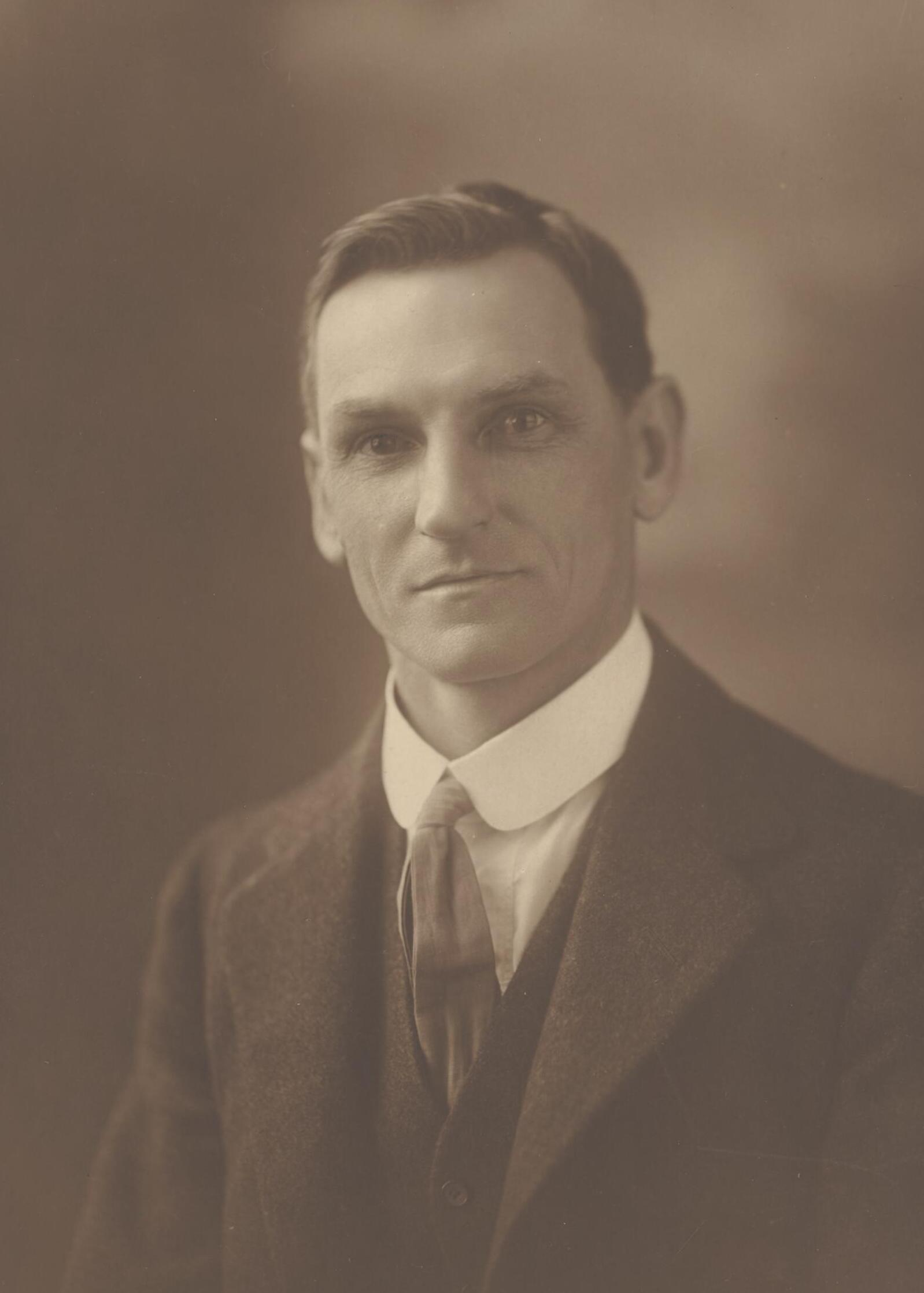

Senator for Queensland
- In office 26 May 1922 – 15 December 1922
- Preceded by: John Adamson
- Succeeded by: William Thompson
- In office 1 August 1928 – 16 November 1928
- Preceded by: Thomas Givens
- In office 1 July 1932 – 17 August 1937
- Succeeded by: Ben Courtice

Personal details
- Born: 14 February 1880 Ōpōtiki, New Zealand
- Died: 17 August 1937 (aged 57) New Farm, Brisbane, Queensland, Australia
- Party: Australian Labor Party
- Occupation: Journalist

John Valentine MacDonald (14 February 1880 – 17 August 1937) was an Australian politician and journalist. He served three terms as a Senator for Queensland – in 1922, in 1928 and from 1932 to 1937 – representing the Australian Labor Party (ALP).

== Early life and journalism career ==
MacDonald was born in Ōpōtiki, New Zealand, the son of an Australian volunteer in the New Zealand Wars and veteran of the 1891 Australian shearers' strike. He completed his early education in New Zealand before his family migrated to New South Wales, whereafter he attended state schools. He spent time as a shearer in New South Wales and Victoria before returning to New Zealand and entering the printing trade. He began as a journeyman compositor, but shifted into journalism over time, working for the Wairoa Guardian and the Napier-based The Daily Telegraph before rising to become chief compositor and acting editor of the Gisborne Herald. He was also involved in the Typographical Association in its early days and taught shorthand at the Gisborne Technical College in 1903–04.

MacDonald later returned to Australia and worked as a journalist at The Argus and then The Age in Melbourne, including a stint in the parliamentary press gallery. He was one of the founding members of the Australian Journalists Association in 1910, spent time in London and studied at the University of London, before returning to Australia. He was then recruited as editor of the new Brisbane newspaper The Daily Standard in 1912, serving in that role until his appointment to the Senate and also serving as acting manager in 1913–14. He was involved in campaigning against the conscription referendums of Billy Hughes, but in 1918 was one of 12 newspaper editors selected by the Nationalist Party government to visit the World War I front.

== Politics ==
On 26 May 1922, he was appointed to the Australian Senate as a Labor Senator for Queensland, filling the casual vacancy caused by the death of Nationalist Senator John Adamson; he had already been preselected as a Labor candidate for the forthcoming election. However, he was defeated at the 1922 election. MacDonald worked as a freelance journalist in the intervening years. Following the death of another Nationalist Senator, Thomas Givens, MacDonald was again appointed to the Senate on 1 August 1928 but was defeated again at the 1928 election. He then worked as chief compiler for the Queensland Tourist Bureau, promoting the state's tourist opportunities. MacDonald was finally elected in his own right in the election of 1931, taking his place in the Senate in 1932. He died in office in 1937 after suffering reported "heart trouble" and was cremated at Mount Thompson Crematorium.
