= 1928 Wisconsin lieutenant gubernatorial election =

- November 6, 1928
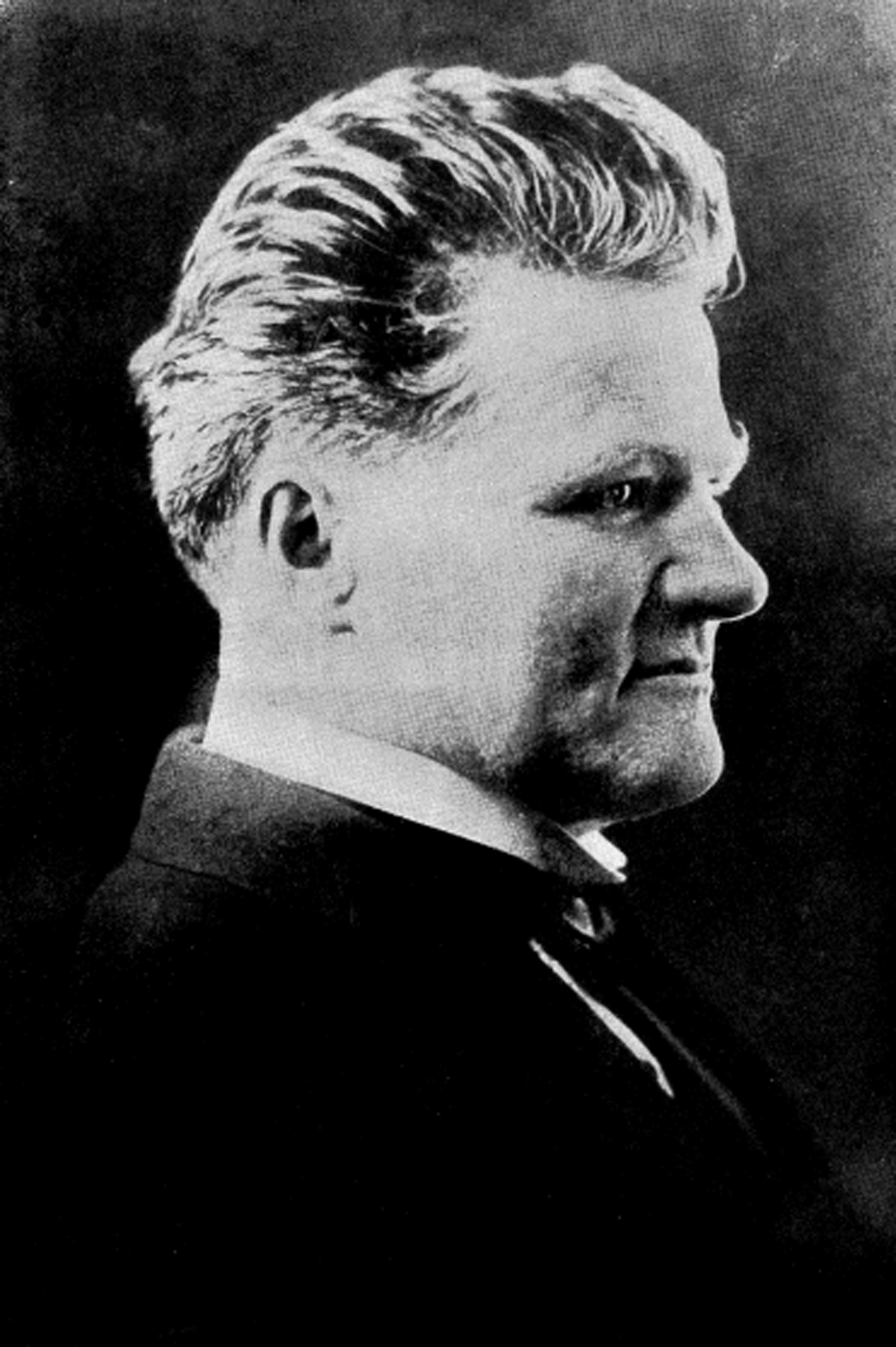

Nominee	Henry Huber	Leo P. Fox
Party	Republican	Democratic
Popular vote	582,456	277,497
Percentage	64.48%	30.72%
Lieutenant Governor before election
Henry Huber
Republican
Elected Lieutenant Governor
Henry Huber
Republican

The 1928 Wisconsin lieutenant gubernatorial election was held on November 6, 1928, in order to elect the lieutenant governor of Wisconsin. Incumbent Republican lieutenant governor Henry Huber defeated Democratic nominee Leo P. Fox, Social-Democratic nominee S. S. Walkup and Prohibition nominee Oliver Needham.

== Republican primary ==
The Republican primary election was held on September 4, 1928. Incumbent lieutenant governor Henry Huber received a majority of the votes (60.52%) against candidates Chester Werden and Harold L. Plummer, and was thus elected as the nominee for the general election.

=== Results ===
1928 Republican lieutenant gubernatorial primary
Party	Candidate	Votes	%
Republican	Henry Huber (incumbent)	261,913	60.52%
Republican	Chester Werden	101,472	23.45%
Republican	Harold L. Plummer	69,410	16.03%
Total votes		432,795	100.00%

== General election ==
On election day, November 6, 1928, incumbent Republican lieutenant governor Henry Huber won re-election by a margin of 304,959 votes against his foremost opponent Democratic nominee Leo P. Fox, thereby retaining Republican control over the office of lieutenant governor. Huber was sworn in for his third term on January 7, 1929.

=== Results ===
Wisconsin lieutenant gubernatorial election, 1928
Party	Candidate	Votes	%
Republican	Henry Huber (incumbent)	582,456	64.48
Democratic	Leo P. Fox	277,497	30.72
Social-Democratic	S. S. Walkup	34,162	3.78
Prohibition	Oliver Needham	6,621	0.74
	Scattering	2,568	0.28
Total votes		903,304	100.00
Republican hold			
