= 1928 Bolivian legislative election =

Parliamentary elections were held in Bolivia on 1 May 1928 to elect members of the National Congress.

== Results ==
Party	Seats			
Party	Chamber	+/–	Senate	+/–
Republican Party	39	+24	5	+3
Nationalist Party	32	+10	9	+3
Genuine Republican Party	5	–12	2	–3
Liberal Party	1	–14	0	–15
Socialist Party	1	–1	0	0
Total	78	+6	16	–12
Source: Political Handbook of the World
