= 1928 Connecticut lieutenant gubernatorial election =

- November 6, 1928
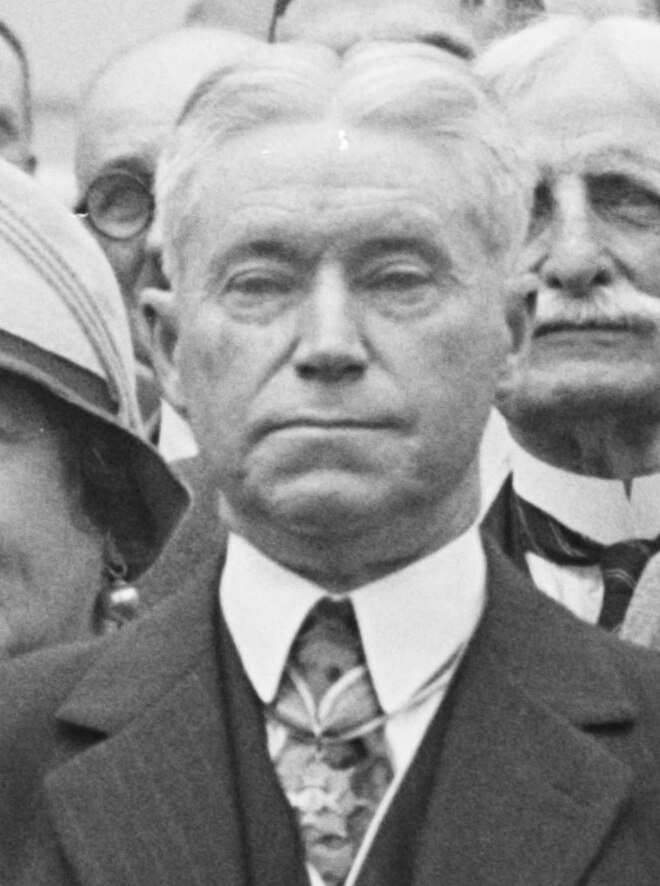

Nominee	Ernest E. Rogers	Frank P. Fenton
Party	Republican	Democratic
Popular vote	296,981	250,929
Percentage	54.20%	45.80%
Lieutenant Governor before election
J. Edwin Brainard
Republican
Elected Lieutenant Governor
Ernest E. Rogers
Republican

The 1928 Connecticut lieutenant gubernatorial election was held on November 6, 1928, to elect the lieutenant governor of Connecticut. Republican nominee and incumbent Connecticut State Treasurer Ernest E. Rogers won the election against Democratic nominee and former member of the Connecticut House of Representatives Frank P. Fenton.

== General election ==
On election day, November 6, 1928, Republican nominee Ernest E. Rogers won the election with 54.20% of the vote, thereby retaining Republican control over the office of lieutenant governor. Rogers was sworn in as the 81st lieutenant governor of Connecticut on January 9, 1929.

=== Results ===
Connecticut lieutenant gubernatorial election, 1928
Party	Candidate	Votes	%
Republican	Ernest E. Rogers	296,981	54.20
Democratic	Frank P. Fenton	250,929	45.80
Total votes		547,910	100.00
Republican hold			
