= 1928 Texas lieutenant gubernatorial election =

- November 6, 1928
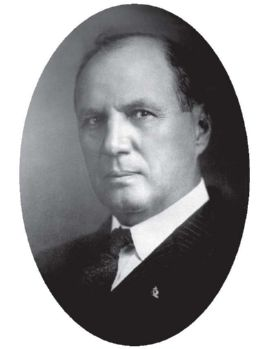

Nominee	Barry Miller	Lena Moore
Party	Democratic	Republican
Popular vote	587,467	121,688
Percentage	82.65%	17.12%
Lieutenant Governor before election
Barry Miller
Democratic
Elected Lieutenant Governor
Barry Miller
Democratic

The 1928 Texas lieutenant gubernatorial election was held on November 6, 1928, in order to elect the lieutenant governor of Texas. Incumbent Democratic lieutenant governor Barry Miller defeated Republican nominee Lena Moore.

== General election ==
On election day, November 6, 1928, incumbent Democratic lieutenant governor Barry Miller won re-election by a margin of 465,779 votes against his opponent Republican nominee Lena Moore, thereby retaining Democratic control over the office of lieutenant governor. Miller was sworn in for his third term on January 15, 1929.

=== Results ===
Texas lieutenant gubernatorial election, 1928
Party	Candidate	Votes	%
Democratic	Barry Miller (incumbent)	587,467	82.65
Republican	Lena Moore	121,688	17.12
	Scattering	1,665	0.23
Total votes		710,820	100.00
Democratic hold			
