= Thomas Givens =

Australian politician (1864–1928)

The Honourable Thomas Givens
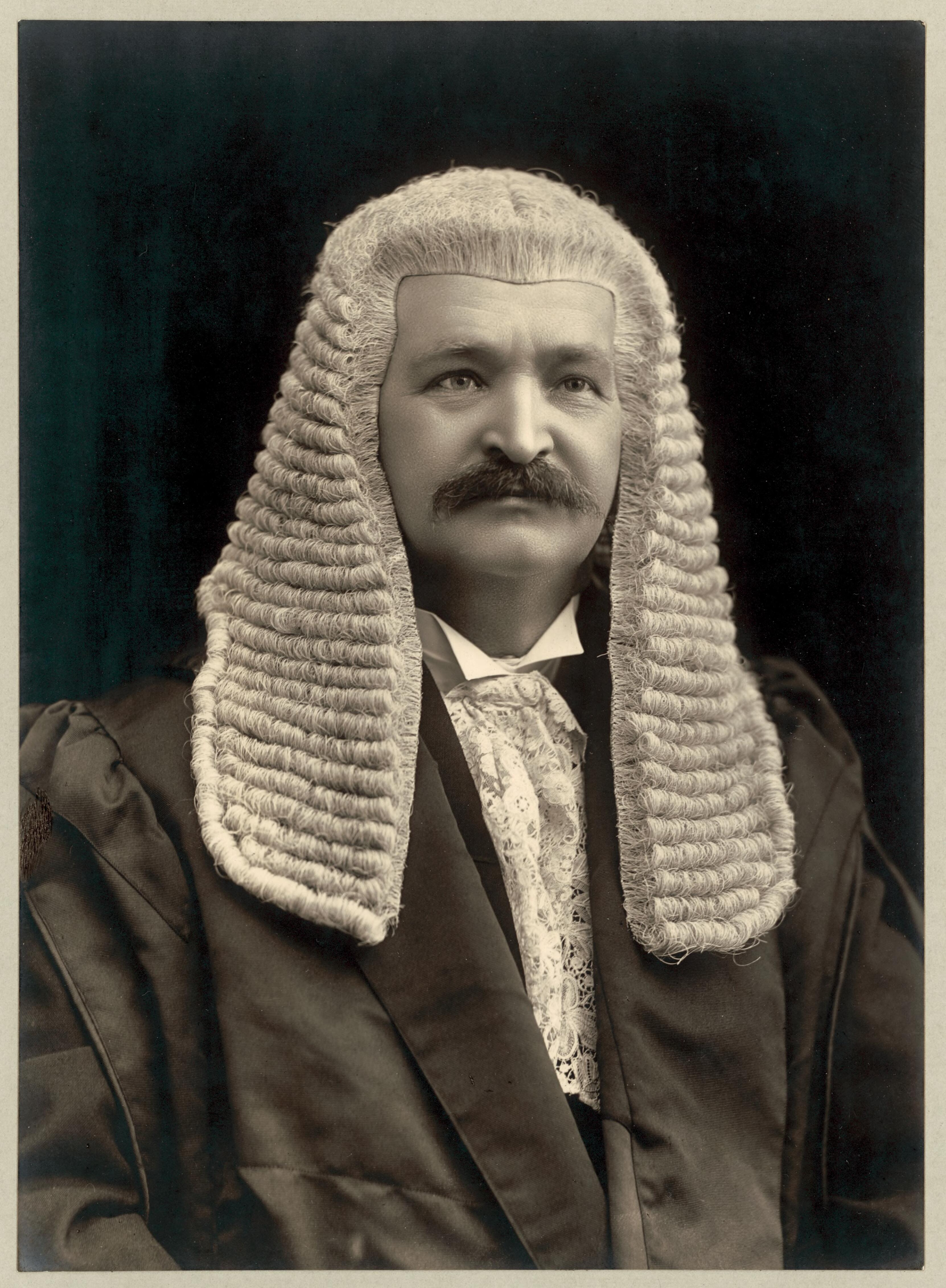

President of the Senate
- In office 9 July 1913 – 30 June 1926
- Preceded by: Harry Turley
- Succeeded by: John Newlands

Senator for Queensland
- In office 1 January 1904 – 19 June 1928
- Succeeded by: John MacDonald

1st National President of the Labor Party
- In office 31 May 1915 – 15 November 1916
- Leader: Billy Hughes
- Succeeded by: Jack Holloway

Member of the Queensland Legislative Assembly for Cairns
- In office 11 March 1899 – 11 March 1902
- Preceded by: Isidor Lissner
- Succeeded by: James Lyons

Personal details
- Born: Henry Thomas Givens; 12 June 1864 Cappagh White, County Tipperary, Ireland
- Died: 19 June 1928 (aged 64) Canterbury, Victoria, Australia
- Resting place: Box Hill Cemetery
- Party: Labor (to 1916); National Labor (1916–1917); Nationalist (from 1917)
- Spouse: Katie Allen (m. 1901)
- Occupation: Labourer, miner, journalist

Henry Thomas Givens (12 June 1864 – 19 June 1928) was an Australian politician. He served as a Senator for Queensland from 1904 until his death in 1928 and was President of the Senate from 1913 to 1926. He began his career in the Australian Labor Party (ALP), serving briefly in the Queensland Legislative Assembly (1899–1902), but became a Nationalist after the party split of 1916. He was born in Ireland and worked as a labourer, miner, trade unionist and newspaper editor before entering politics.

== Early life ==
Givens was born on 12 June 1864 in Cappagh White, County Tipperary, Ireland. He was the son of Mary Ann (née White) and Robert Givens, a farmer. He was educated in Ireland at a Catholic primary school, although he was a Protestant. According to one account, he was associated with the Irish National Land League and was gaoled for a period.

Givens emigrated to Australia in 1882, landing at Maryborough, Queensland. He initially worked on the canefields of North Queensland and also spent time in New South Wales and Victoria, "probably as an itinerant bush worker". He then returned to Queensland as a miner, spending 16 years working on the goldfields around Charters Towers. According to a 1910 profile in Punch, Givens also went to Western Australia to participate in the Kimberley gold rush, but "came back wiser and poorer". He helped establish a miners' union at Eidsvold and later became an organiser for the Australian Workers' Union, initially at Charters Towers.

== Colonial politics ==
Givens was a Labour candidate at the 1893 general election, losing to the incumbent attorney-general Thomas Joseph Byrnes in the seat of Cairns. He campaigned on an anti-Kanaka platform. He reprised his candidacy in 1896 and lost by 43 votes.

Givens succeeded on his third attempt, winning Cairns at the 1899 election. He was defeated by James Lyons after a single term in 1902. In parliament, Givens spoke mainly on the sugar industry where he was strongly opposed to the use of "black labour". He proposed that Pacific Islanders be banned from working in factories and within 5 miles (8.0 km) of a factory.

== Federal politics ==
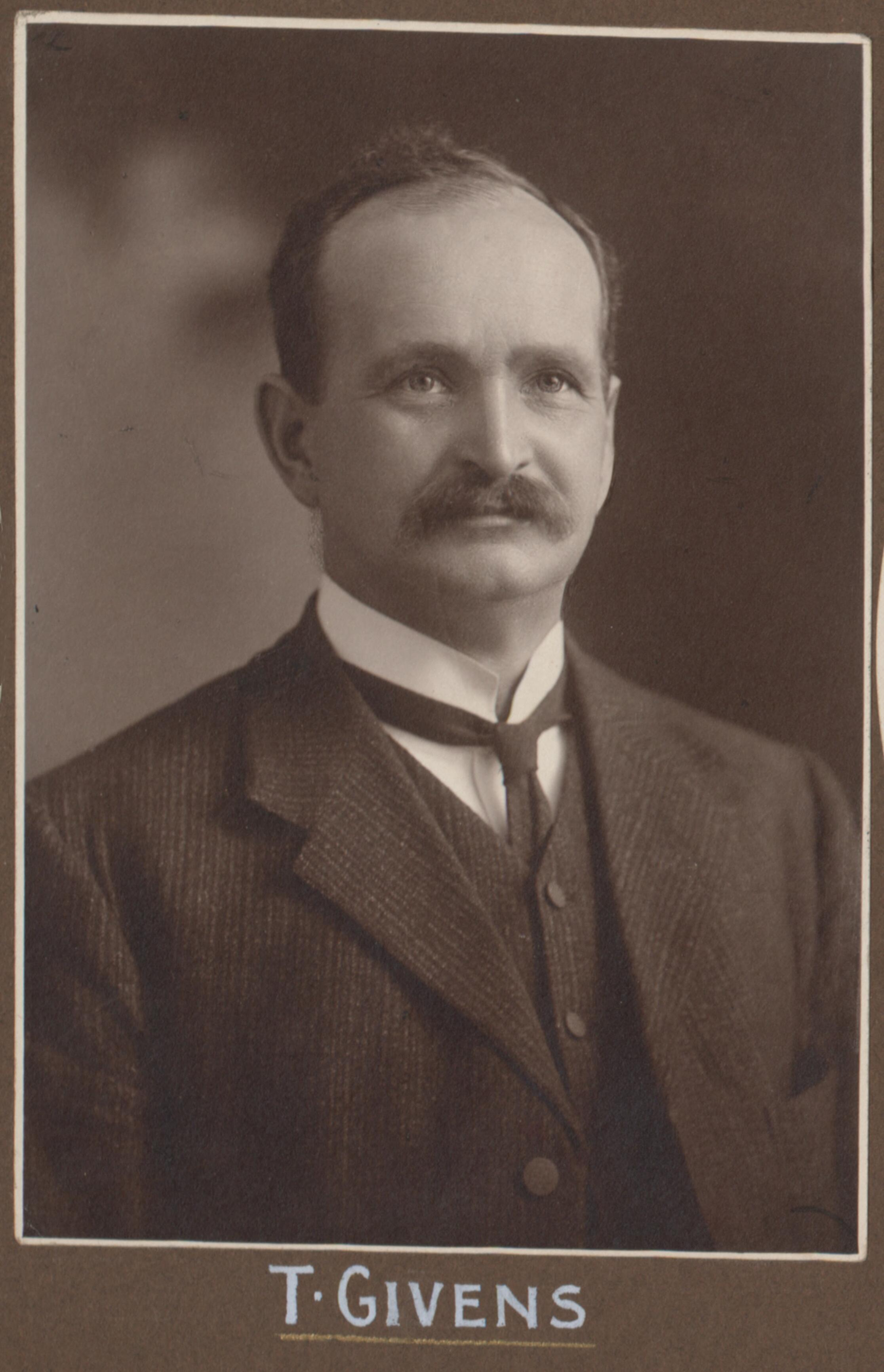
Givens in 1908

=== Early years ===
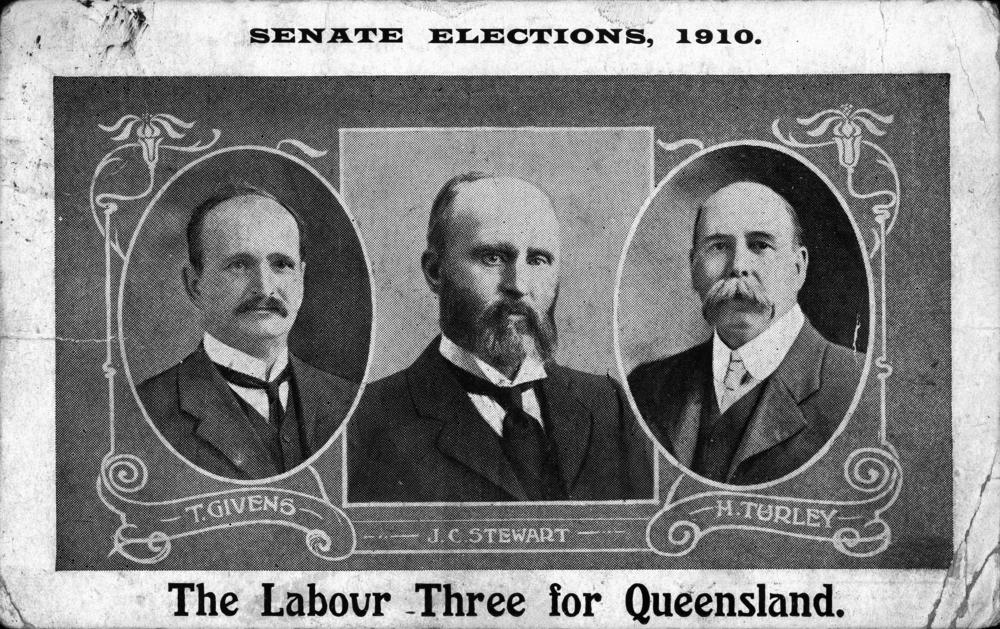
1910 Labor Senate ticket, with Givens on left

Givens was elected to the Senate at the 1903 federal election, to a term beginning on 1 January 1904. In parliament he identified himself as having "the honour of coming from the furthest northern part of Australia of any member of this Parliament". He was a member of the Senate select committee into the press cable service in 1909 and served as a temporary chairman of committees from 1910 to 1912. He was also appointed to the royal commission into the pearling industry in 1913.

Givens was supportive of the ALP platform and was considered a "good party man". In his speeches on North Queensland he remained critical of the use of coloured labour, particularly the Colonial Sugar Refinery's use of Chinese labourers, and supported the Deakin government's Sugar Bounty Act 1905 which subsidised sugargrowers who employed white men. He supported the expansion of invalid and old-age pensions and the introduction of maternity allowances for unwed mothers. On industrial matters he supported union preference.

=== President of the Senate ===
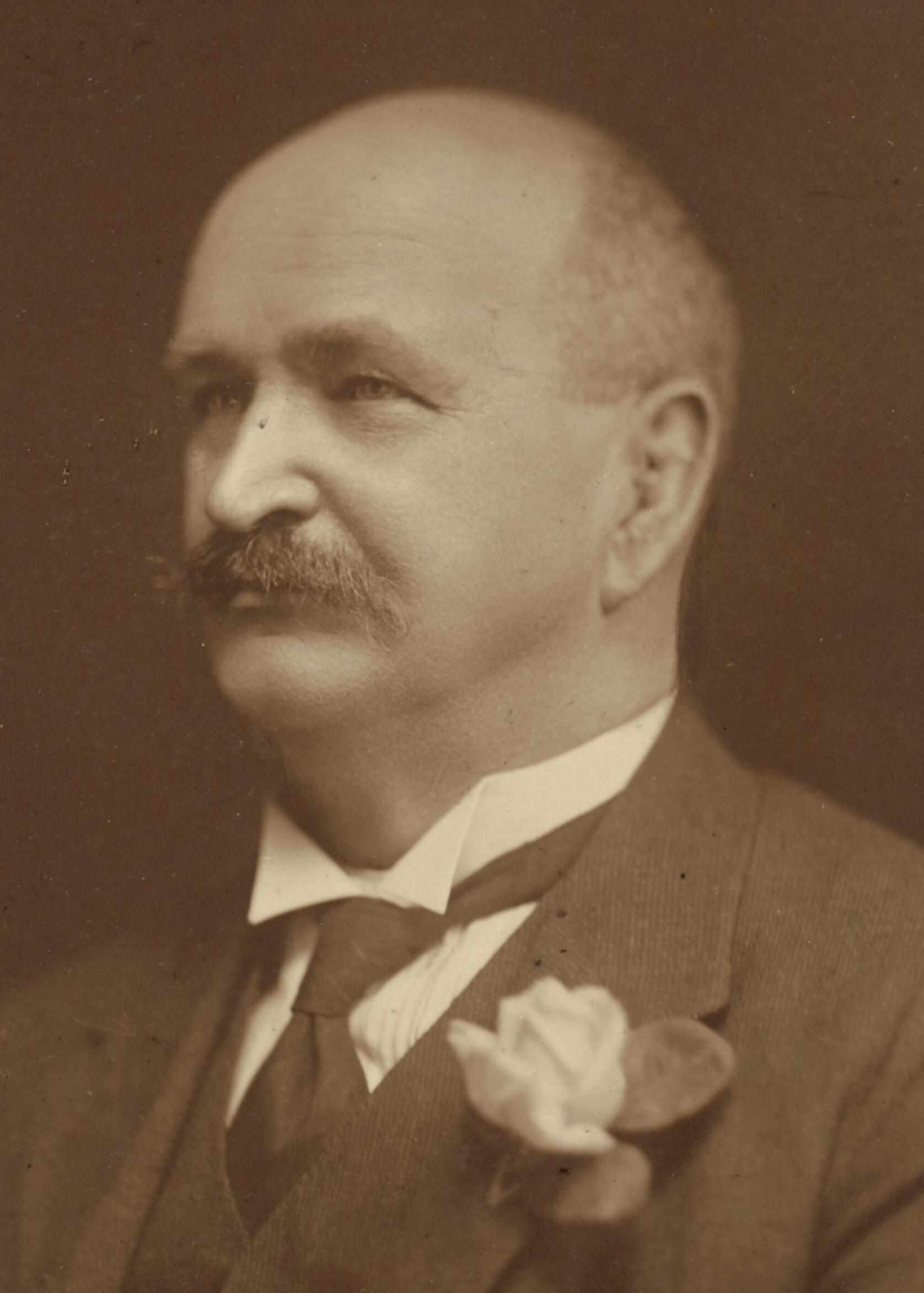
Undated photo by T. Humphrey & Co.

Givens was elected president of the Senate on 9 July 1913, replacing his ALP colleague and fellow Queenslander Harry Turley. After the formation of the ALP federal executive in 1915, he was also elected as the party's inaugural federal president, having previously served as a Queensland delegate to the ALP federal conference since 1908.

Givens was a significant figure in the ALP split over conscription. In September 1916 he gave an "impassioned political speech in favour of conscription" from the president's chair, which his ALP colleague George Pearce remembered as the "finest speech ever delivered in the Senate". Following the expulsion of pro-conscription Prime Minister Billy Hughes from the party in November 1916, Givens followed Hughes into his new National Labor Party and retained the presidency of the Senate. He and Pearce played a key role in convincing members of the ALP caucus to join Hughes.

In March 1917, Givens sued The Age for libel, seeking damages of £5,000 (equivalent to $500,000 in 2022). The newspaper had reported Senator David Watson's allegations that Givens had attempted to bribe him to resign. His suit was unsuccessful as it was held that the article in question was a factual account of parliamentary proceedings.

As president, Givens upheld the independence of parliament from the executive, ensuring the administration of parliamentary departments remained separate from the Commonwealth Public Service. He was protective of parliamentary privilege, opposing attempts to censor Hansard during World War I. A number of his rulings established longstanding practices in the Senate, particularly around its treatment of taxation bills in accordance with section 53 of the constitution. Givens announced his retirement from the presidency in 1926, a year before parliament relocated to the new capital Canberra. He remained in the Senate as a government backbencher until his death in office on 19 June 1928.

== Personal life ==
Givens married Katie Allen in 1901, with whom he had three sons and three daughters. He died of cardiac disease at his home in Canterbury, Victoria, on 19 June 1928, aged 64. He was granted a state funeral and buried at Box Hill Cemetery. The Queensland Parliament appointed Labor member John MacDonald as his replacement.

Parliament of Australia
| Preceded by Harry Turley | President of the Senate; 1913–1926 | Succeeded by John Newlands |
Parliament of Queensland
| Preceded by Isidor Lissner | Member for Cairns; 1899–1902 | Succeeded by James Lyons |
