= Members of the Australian House of Representatives, 1928–1929 =

This is a list of the members of the Australian House of Representatives in the 11th Australian Parliament, which was elected at the 1928 election on 17 November 1928. The incumbent Nationalist Party of Australia led by Prime Minister of Australia Stanley Bruce in power since 1922 with coalition partner the Country Party led by Earle Page defeated the opposition Australian Labor Party led by Matthew Charlton.

Member	Party	Electorate	State	In office
Aubrey Abbott	Country	Gwydir	NSW	1925–1929, 1931–1937
Frank Anstey	Labor	Bourke	Vic	1910–1934
Llewellyn Atkinson	Nationalist	Wilmot	Tas	1906–1929
James Bayley	Nationalist	Oxley	Qld	1917–1931
Jack Beasley	Labor	West Sydney	NSW	1928–1946
George Bell	Nationalist	Darwin	Tas	1919–1922, 1925–1943
Arthur Blakeley	Labor	Darling	NSW	1917–1934
Eric Bowden	Nationalist	Parramatta	NSW	1906–1910, 1919–1929
Frank Brennan	Labor	Batman	Vic	1911–1931, 1934–1949
Stanley Bruce	Nationalist	Flinders	Vic	1918–1929, 1931–1933
Donald Charles Cameron	Nationalist	Brisbane	Qld	1919–1931, 1934–1937
Malcolm Cameron	Nationalist	Barker	SA	1922–1934
Ben Chifley	Labor	Macquarie	NSW	1928–1931, 1940–1951
Percy Coleman	Labor	Reid	NSW	1922–1931
Maurice Collins	Country	Wakefield	SA	1928–1929
Bernard Corser	Country	Wide Bay	Qld	1928–1954
Charles Culley	Labor	Denison	Tas	1928–1931
John Curtin	Labor	Fremantle	WA	1928–1931, 1934–1945
James Fenton	Labor	Maribyrnong	Vic	1910–1934
Frank Forde	Labor	Capricornia	Qld	1922–1946
Grosvenor Francis	Nationalist	Kennedy	Qld	1925–1929
Josiah Francis	Nationalist	Moreton	Qld	1922–1955
Sydney Gardner	Nationalist	Robertson	NSW	1922–1940
William Gibson	Country	Corangamite	Vic	1918–1929, 1931–1934
Albert Green	Labor	Kalgoorlie	WA	1922–1940
Roland Green	Country	Richmond	NSW	1922–1937
Henry Gregory	Country	Swan	WA	1913–1940
Sir Littleton Groom	Nationalist	Darling Downs	Qld	1901–1929, 1931–1936
Henry Gullett	Nationalist	Henty	Vic	1925–1940
William Hill	Country	Echuca	Vic	1919–1934
Sir Neville Howse	Nationalist	Calare	NSW	1922–1929
Billy Hughes	Nationalist	North Sydney	NSW	1901–1952
James Hunter	Country	Maranoa	Qld	1921–1940
Geoffry Hurry	Nationalist	Bendigo	Vic	1922–1929
Syd Jackson	Nationalist	Bass	Tas	1919–1929
Rowley James	Labor	Hunter	NSW	1928–1958
Paul Jones	Labor	Indi	Vic	1928–1931
William Killen	Country	Riverina	NSW	1922–1931
Andrew Lacey	Labor	Grey	SA	1922–1931
John Latham	Nationalist	Kooyong	Vic	1922–1934
Bert Lazzarini	Labor	Werriwa	NSW	1919–1931, 1934–1952
John Lister	Nationalist	Corio	Vic	1917–1929
William Long	Labor	Lang	NSW	1928–1931
George Mackay	Nationalist	Lilley	Qld	1917–1934
Norman Makin	Labor	Hindmarsh	SA	1919–1946, 1954–1963
William Maloney	Labor	Melbourne	Vic	1904–1940
Edward Mann	Nationalist	Perth	WA	1922–1929
Walter Marks	Nationalist	Wentworth	NSW	1919–1931
Charles Marr	Nationalist	Parkes	NSW	1919–1929, 1931–1943
George Martens	Labor	Herbert	Qld	1928–1946
James Mathews	Labor	Melbourne Ports	Vic	1906–1931
George Maxwell	Nationalist	Fawkner	Vic	1917–1935
Charles McGrath	Labor	Ballaarat	Vic	1913–1919, 1920–1934
William McWilliams	Independent	Franklin	Tas	1903–1922, 1928–1929
Parker Moloney	Labor	Hume	NSW	1910–1913, 1914–1917, 1919–1931
Harold George Nelson	Labor	Northern Territory	NT	1922–1934
Sir Earle Page	Country	Cowper	NSW	1919–1961
Archdale Parkhill	Nationalist	Warringah	NSW	1927–1937
Walter Parsons	Nationalist	Angas	SA	1925–1929
Thomas Paterson	Country	Gippsland	Vic	1922–1943
John Perkins	Nationalist	Eden-Monaro	NSW	1926–1929, 1931–1943
Graham Pratten	Nationalist	Martin	NSW	1928–1929
John Price	Labor	Boothby	SA	1928–1941
John Prowse	Country	Forrest	WA	1919–1943
Edward Charles Riley	Labor	Cook	NSW	1922–1934
Edward Riley	Labor	South Sydney	NSW	1910–1931
Arthur Rodgers	Nationalist	Wannon	Vic	1913–1922, 1925–1929
James Scullin	Labor	Yarra	Vic	1910–1913, 1922–1949
Percy Stewart	Independent	Wimmera	Vic	1919–1931
Ted Theodore	Labor	Dalley	NSW	1927–1931
Victor Thompson	Country	New England	NSW	1922–1940
James Tully	Labor	Barton	NSW	1928–1931
David Watkins	Labor	Newcastle	NSW	1901–1935
William Watt	Nationalist	Balaclava	Vic	1914–1929
John West	Labor	East Sydney	NSW	1910–1931
Thomas White	Nationalist	Balaclava	Vic	1929–1951
George Edwin Yates	Labor	Adelaide	SA	1914–1919, 1922–1931
