= John Newlands (Australian politician) =

Australian politician

The Honourable Sir John Newlands KCMG, CBE
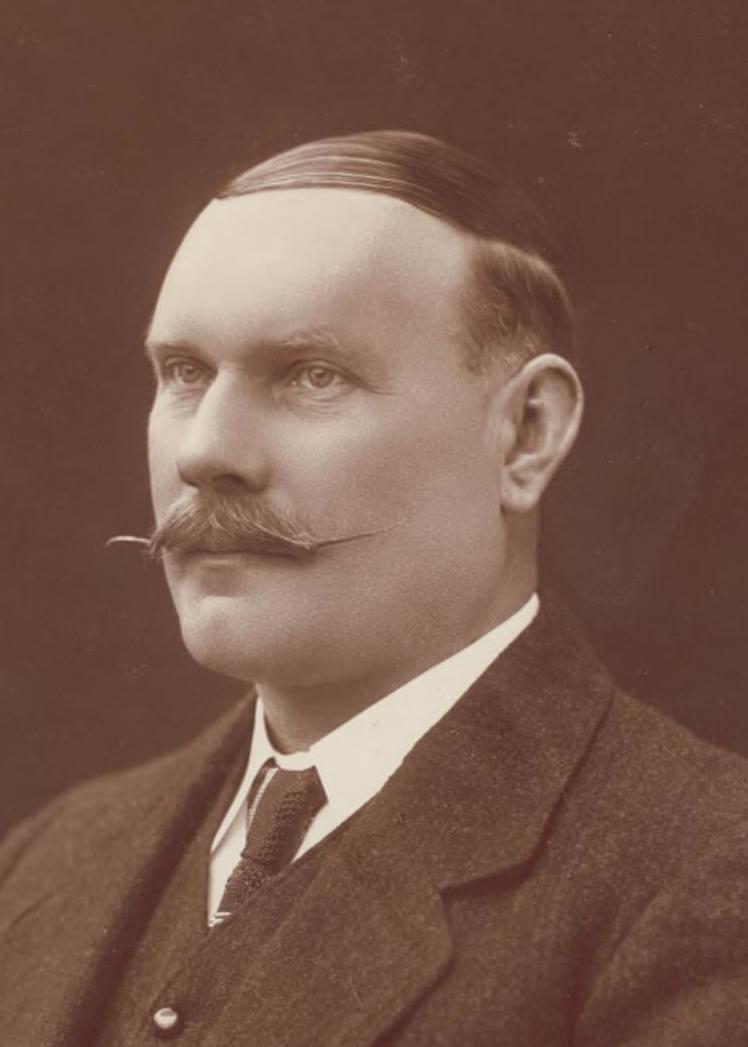

President of the Australian Senate
- In office 1 July 1926 – 13 August 1929
- Preceded by: Thomas Givens
- Succeeded by: Walter Kingsmill

Senator for South Australia
- In office 1 July 1913 – 20 May 1932

Personal details
- Born: 4 August 1864 Nairnshire, Scotland
- Died: 20 May 1932 (aged 67) Glenelg, South Australia
- Party: Labor (1913–16); National Labor (1916–17); Nationalist (1917–31); UAP (1931–32)
- Occupation: Railway worker

Sir John Newlands KCMG, CBE (4 August 1864 – 20 May 1932), also known as John Newland, was a Scottish-born Australian politician.

Born in Cawdor, Nairnshire, Newlands was the son of Andrew Newlands, agricultural labourer, and his wife Ann, née Stunar. Newlands was educated in Croy, Scotland before migrating to New South Wales, Australia in 1883. He married Theresa Glassey on 27 February 1884 in Adelaide, and that year began to use Newland as his surname. He became a railway worker, also in 1884, initially as a lamp cleaner and porter. While a conductor on the Broken Hill express, he and a fellow-conductor developed a gambling system that so impressed a group of mining magnates that they bankrolled a trip for the two to Monte Carlo. Fortune eluded them however, and they returned to Adelaide with a new respect for mathematics. He was elected chairman of the District Council of Terowie, when after 13 years he was obliged to resign from the railways. He helped found in 1908 the Railway Officers' Association, a trade union of which he was appointed general secretary, a position he held until his resignation in 1913.

In November 1906 Newland was elected to the South Australian House of Assembly as the Labor member for Burra Burra. In February 1912 he lost his marginal seat in the 1912 state election, but was elected to the Australian Senate in the 1913 federal election as a Labor Senator for South Australia. He left the Labor Party in the 1916 split over conscription, joining the Nationalist Party. He served as Chairman of Committees from 1923 to 1926. On 1 July 1926, he was appointed President of the Senate, succeeding Thomas Givens. He held the presidency until 13 August 1929, when he was succeeded by Walter Kingsmill. He was knighted in 1927, and reverted his name to Newlands. He had several periods of convalescence due to ill health and died in 1932 in Glenelg, Adelaide, South Australia, while his term was still unexpired. No appointment was made.

== See also ==
- Hundred of Newland

Parliament of Australia
Preceded by Thomas Givens	President of the Senate; 1926–1929	Succeeded by Walter Kingsmill
