= John Dooley (politician) =

Australian politician

The Honourable John Dooley
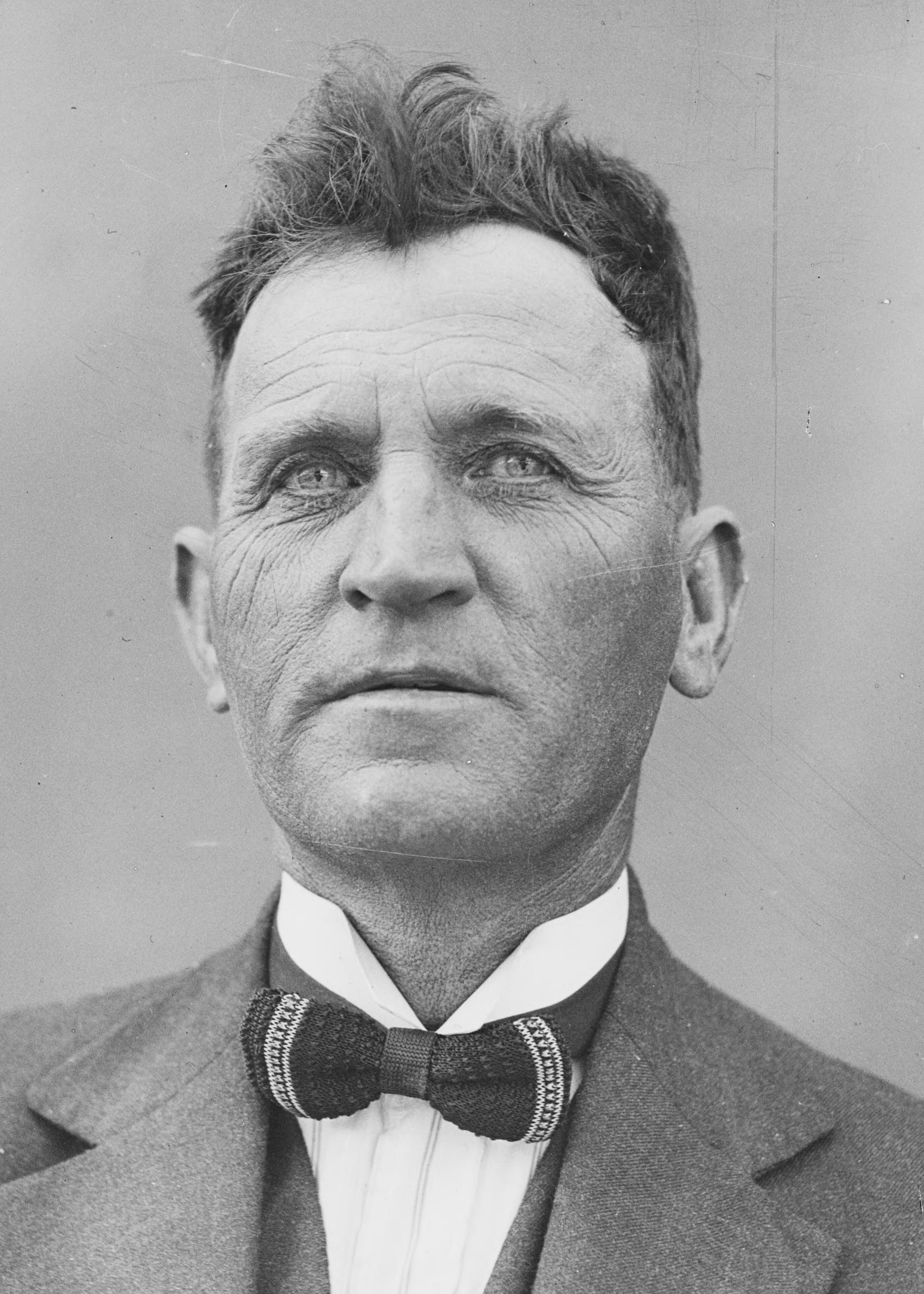

Senator for New South Wales
- In office 17 November 1928 – 30 June 1935
- Preceded by: Albert Gardiner

Personal details
- Born: 11 November 1883 Tumbarumba, New South Wales, Australia
- Died: 2 August 1961 (aged 77) Kogarah, New South Wales, Australia
- Party: Labor
- Parent: John Dooley (father)
- Occupation: Labourer, unionist, miner

John Braidwood Dooley (11 November 1883 – 2 August 1961) was an Australian politician who served as a Senator for New South Wales from 1928 to 1935. He was a member of the Australian Labor Party (ALP) and served as an assistant minister in the Scullin government.

== Early life ==
Dooley was born at Tumbarumba, New South Wales to John Dooley (d. 1930), a prominent member of the Australian Workers' Union, and his wife in 1883. He was educated at Wagga Wagga Superior Public School and at Courabyra, but left school early to become a shearer and miner. From 1901 to 1904 he was as an organizer of the Rural Workers' Union. In 1910 when he was a labourer on railways in Sydney, he helped establish the Railway Workers' and General Labourers' Association, which he helped merge into the Australian Workers' Union in 1916. He later worked as a foreman in the Murrumbidgee Irrigation Area and on Burrinjuck Dam.

== Politics ==
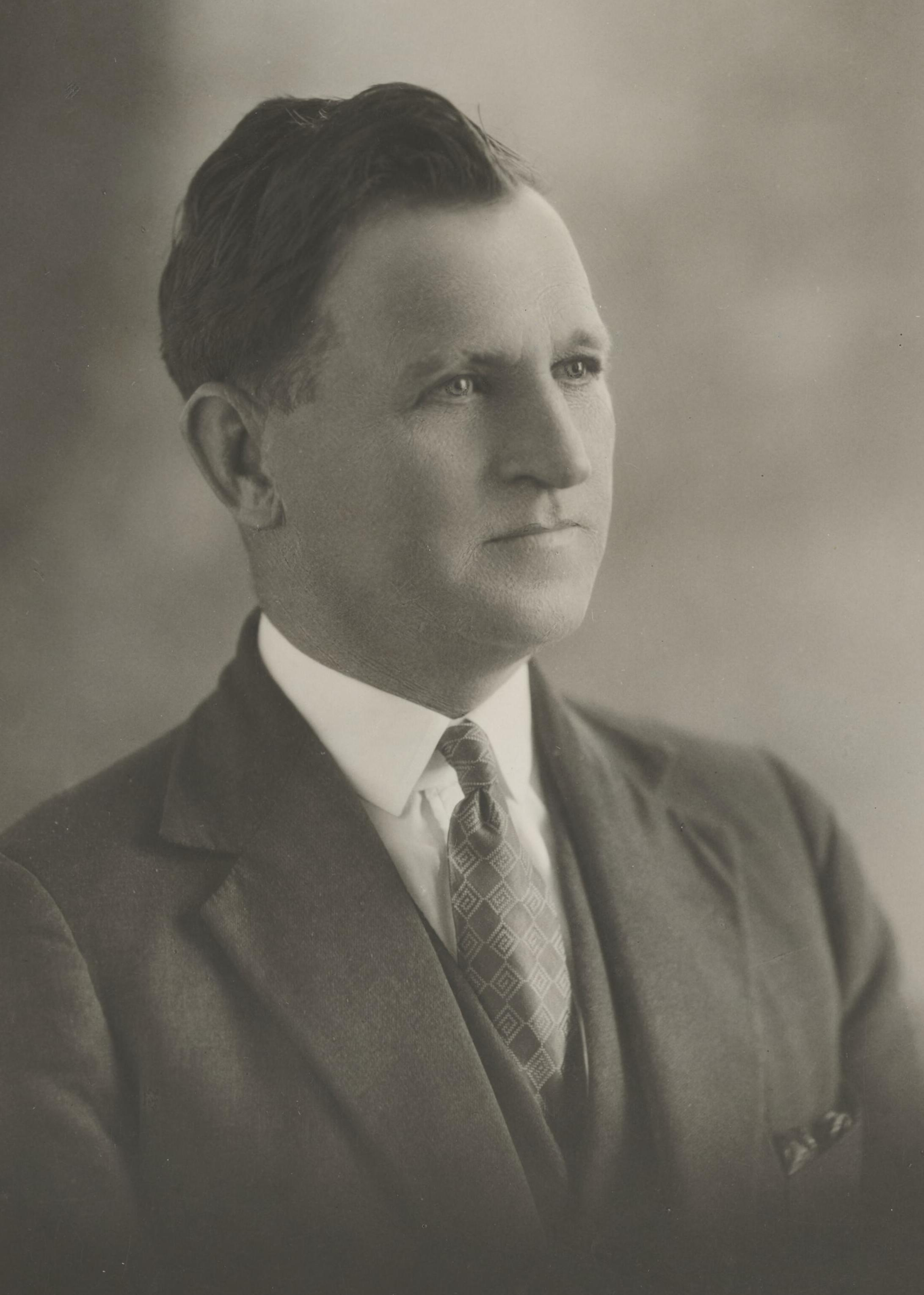
Dooley c. 1929

Dooley ran for Labor unsuccessfully for Senate at the 1925 election, but succeeded at the 1928 election. He was deputy leader of the Senate from August to October 1929 and from February to August 1932. He was appointed Assistant Minister assisting the Minister for Works and Railways in March 1931 in the Scullin Ministry. He remained a supporter of James Scullin rather than Jack Lang during the Labor split over the fiscal policy required to deal with the Great Depression. As a result, he lost his seat in the Senate at the September 1934 election, partly because he lost Australian Workers' Union endorsement.

== Later life ==
Dooley returned to work as a works supervisor and died at St George Hospital, Kogarah, survived by his wife, six daughters and two of his three sons.
