= 1928 Australian federal election =

- 17 November 1928

All 76 (Note: The Northern Territory had one seat, but members for the territories did not have full voting rights until 1966 and did not count toward government formation.) seats in the House of Representatives 38 seats were needed for a majority in the House 19 (of the 36) seats in the Senate
- Registered: 3,444,769 ▲4.32%
- Turnout: 2,728,815 (93.64%) (Note: Turnout in contested seats) (▲2.25 pp)
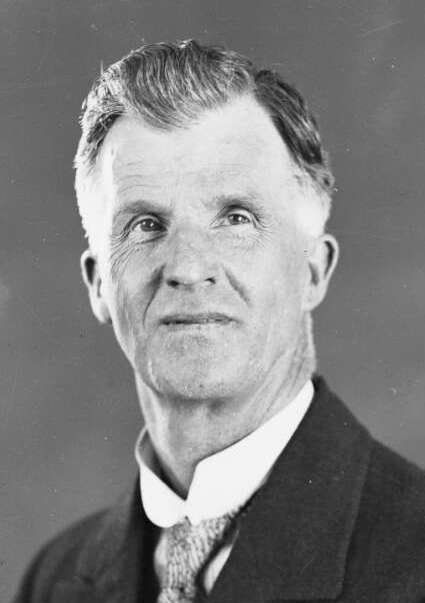

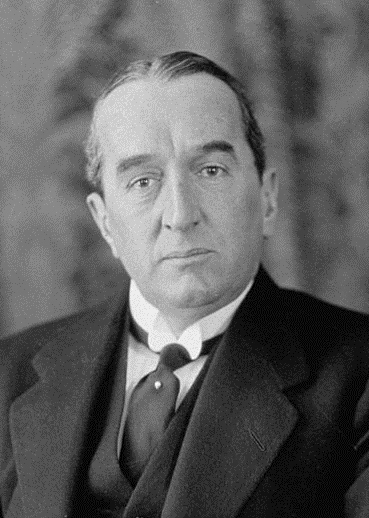

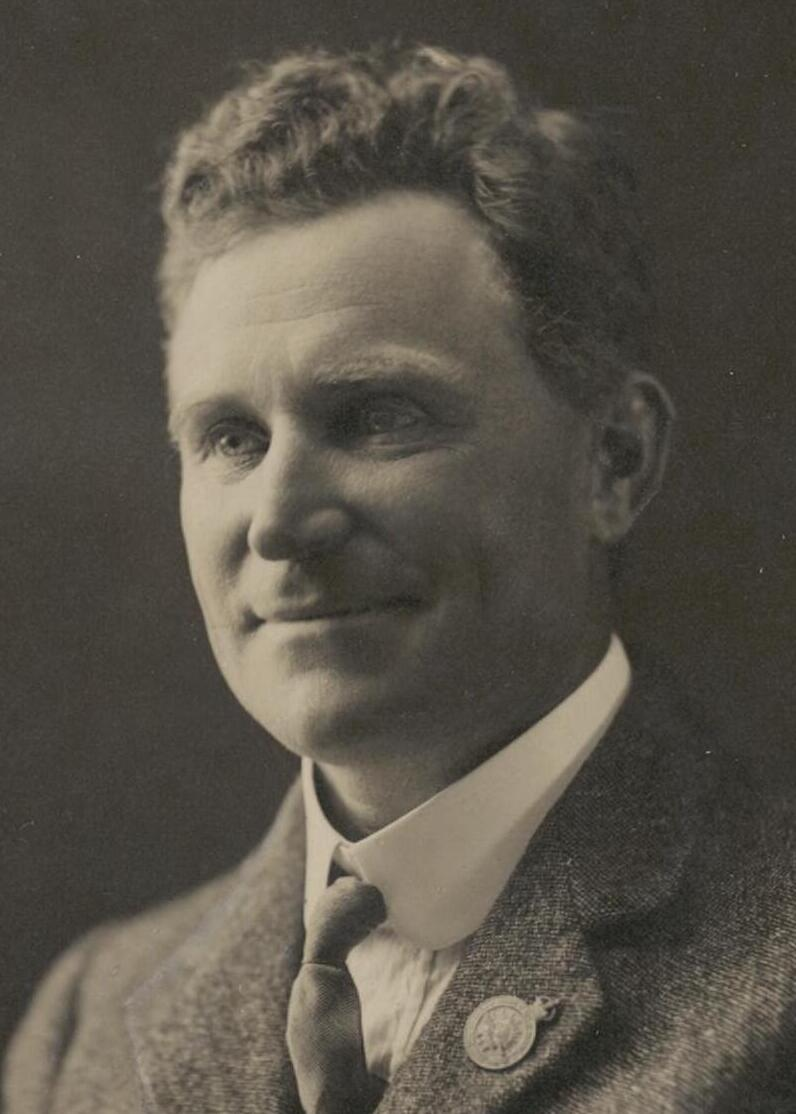
	First party	Second party	Third party
Leader	James Scullin	Stanley Bruce	Earle Page
Party	Labor	Nationalist	Country
Leader since	26 April 1928	9 February 1923	5 April 1921
Leader's seat	Yarra (Vic.)	Flinders (Vic.)	Cowper (NSW)
Last election	23 seats	37 seats	13 seats
Seats won	31 + NT	29	13
Seat change	▲8	▼8	Steady
Primary vote	1,158,505	1,014,522	271,686
Percentage	44.64%	39.09%	10.47%
Swing	▼0.40	▼3.37%	▼0.27%
- Results by division for the House of Representatives, shaded by winning party's margin of victory.
Prime Minister before election
Stanley Bruce
Nationalist/Country coalition
Subsequent Prime Minister
Stanley Bruce
Nationalist/Country coalition

The 1928 Australian federal election was held in Australia on 17 November 1928. All 75 seats in the House of Representatives and 19 of the 36 seats in the Senate were up for election. The incumbent Nationalist–Country coalition, led by Prime Minister Stanley Bruce won a record fifth consecutive election defeating the opposition Labor Party led by James Scullin.

The election was held in conjunction with a referendum on Commonwealth–State relations, which was carried.

Future Prime Ministers John Curtin and Ben Chifley both entered parliament at this election. Both then lost their seats in the 1931 election and did not re-enter parliament until 1934 and 1940 respectively.

== Background ==
=== Industrial troubles ===
The lead-up to the 1928 election was marked by industrial tension, including a major strike of waterside workers beginning in December 1927. After a further strike of ship's cooks beginning in March 1928 and attempts by the Waterside Workers' Federation of Australia to repudiate an industrial award ruling, the government began to crack down on union activity in the sector. The Transport Workers Act 1928 passed two months before the election, giving the government the power to terminate the employment of waterside workers who engaged in unapproved union activity.

=== Country Party tensions ===
The second term of the Bruce–Page government was marked by conflict between the federal parliamentary Country Party, which supported the alliance with the Nationalists, and state branches and farmers' organisations which "questioned the coalition strategy and demanded that the Country Party return to parliamentary and electoral independence". The government imposed multiple tariff hikes, which were unpopular with the Country Party's base of small farmers.

Many Country Party members considered the pact with the Nationalists to have compromised the party's independence, with "anti-pact" factions prominent in South Australia, Victoria and Western Australia. In 1926, former Country Party minister Percy Stewart left the party and formed a separate Country Progressive Party, sitting on the crossbench. The Nationalists and Country Party ultimately agreed to renew their electoral pact prior to the 1928 election, with the modification that both parties could stand candidates in a seat if the incumbent was not recontesting.

== Campaign ==
The Bruce–Page government fought its election campaign "almost exclusively on industrial peace". Bruce delivered his policy speech on 9 October, seeking a "further mandate to impose law and order in the trade unions" and proposing a joint conference of workers and employers to review federal industrial law. He also promised to cut back the government's migration schemes to combat rising unemployment. The government also "strongly promoted" its National Insurance scheme, which would have provided "sickness, old age, disability and maternity benefits, mainly paid for by compulsory contributions by workers and employers, along with smaller payments to parents of children under 16 and to orphans". The National Insurance Bill 1928 had been introduced in September 1928 but failed to pass before the dissolution of parliament.

Opposition leader James Scullin contested his first federal election as leader, having replaced Matthew Charlton as ALP leader in March 1928. He campaigned for higher tariffs, an expansion of the Commonwealth Bank, and for the Commonwealth Line to be kept in public ownership.

A referendum on a constitutional amendment allowing the federal government to assume state debts was held simultaneously with the federal election. Both the government and the opposition supported a "Yes" vote.

== Results ==
Nationalist: 29 seats Labor: 31 seats Country: 13 seats Country Progressive: 1 seat Independent: 1 seat

=== House of Representatives ===
House of Reps (IRV) — 1928–29—Turnout 93.64% (CV) — Informal 4.90%
Party	First preference Votes	%	Swing	Seats	Change
Nationalist–Country coalition	1,286,208	49.56	–3.64	42	–8
Nationalist	1,014,522	39.09	–3.37	29	–8
Country	271,686	10.47	–0.27	13	0
Labor	1,158,505	44.64	–0.40	32 (Note: Including Northern Territory)	+8
Country Progressive	41,713	1.61	+1.61	1	+1
Protestant Labor	20,212	0.78	+0.78	0	0
Independents	88,447	3.41	+1.65	1	–1
Total	2,595,085			76	
Two-party-preferred (estimated)
Nationalist–Country coalition	Win	51.60	−2.20	42	–8
Labor		48.40	+2.20	31	+8

Notes

- Independent: William McWilliams (Franklin, Tas.).
- Twelve members were elected unopposed – three Labor, five Nationalist, and four Country.

First preference vote
Labor	44.64%
Nationalist	39.09%
Country	10.47%
Country Progressive	1.61%
Independent/Other	4.19%

Two-party-preferred vote
Coalition	51.60%
Labor	48.40%

Parliament seats
Coalition	56.00%
Labor	41.33%
Country Progressive	1.33%
Independent	1.33%

=== Senate ===
Senate (P BV) — 1928–31—Turnout 93.61% (CV) — Informal 9.88%
Party	First preference votes	%	Swing	Seats won	Seats held	Change
Nationalist–Country coalition	1,466,323	50.46	–4.35	12	29	+1
Nationalist	1,141,405	39.28	–6.07	10	24	0
Country	324,918	11.18	+1.73	2	5	+1
Labor	1,422,418	48.95	+3.93	7	7	–1
Independents	17,092	0.59	+0.42	0	0	0
Total	2,905,833			19	36	

== Seats changing hands ==
Seat	Pre-1928			Swing	Post-1928		
Seat	Party	Member	Margin	Swing	Margin	Member	Party
Barton, NSW	Nationalist	Thomas Ley	1.0	7.3	6.3	James Tully	Labor
Boothby, SA	Nationalist	Jack Duncan-Hughes	7.6	7.7	0.1	John Price	Labor
Denison, Tas	Nationalist	John Gellibrand	2.2	2.5	0.3	Charles Culley	Labor
Franklin, Tas	Nationalist	Alfred Seabrook	N/A	7.2	1.6	William McWilliams	Independent
Fremantle, WA	Independent	William Watson	8.1	1.2	2.1	John Curtin	Labor
Herbert, Qld	Nationalist	Lewis Nott	0.3	0.5	0.2	George Martens	Labor
Indi, Vic	Country	Robert Cook (Note: Cook had mistaken the deadline for filing his application, therefore his seat went to Labor by default)	6.7	N/A	(Unopposed)	Paul Jones	Labor
Lang, NSW	Nationalist	Elliot Johnson	5.9	9.4	3.5	William Long	Labor
Macquarie, NSW	Nationalist	Arthur Manning	1.3	6.2	4.9	Ben Chifley	Labor
Wakefield, SA	Nationalist	Richard Foster	14.8	24.4	9.6	Maurice Collins	Country
Wilmot, Tas	Country	Llewellyn Atkinson	7.0	N/A	4.6	Llewellyn Atkinson	Nationalist

- Members listed in italics did not contest their seat at this election.

In the Division of Indi, the sitting candidate Robert Cook lost his seat after forgetting to file nomination papers, resulting in Labor candidate Paul Jones winning the seat unopposed.

== See also ==
- Candidates of the 1928 Australian federal election
- Members of the Australian House of Representatives, 1928–1929
- Members of the Australian Senate, 1929–1932
