= Electoral results for the Division of Wannon =

Australian division election results

This is a list of electoral results for the Division of Wannon in Australian federal elections from the division's creation in 1901 until the present.

== Members ==
Member	Party	Term
Samuel Cooke	Free Trade	1901–1903
Arthur Robinson	Free Trade/Anti-Socialist	1903–1906
John McDougall	Labor	1906–1913
Arthur Rodgers	Liberal	1913–1917
Arthur Rodgers	Nationalist	1917–1922
John McNeill	Labor	1922–1925
Arthur Rodgers	Nationalist	1925–1929
John McNeill	Labor	1929–1931
Thomas Scholfield	United Australia	1931–1940
Don McLeod	Labor	1940–1949
Dan Mackinnon	Liberal	1949–1951
Don McLeod	Labor	1951–1955
Malcolm Fraser	Liberal	1955–1983
David Hawker	Liberal	1983 by–2010
Dan Tehan	Liberal	2010–present

== Election results ==
=== Elections in the 2020s ===
==== 2025 ====
2025 Australian federal election: Wannon
Party	Candidate	Votes	%	±%
Independent	Alex Dyson			
Family First	Lee-Ann Elmes			
Greens	Kate Gazzard			
Trumpet of Patriots	Julie Ann McCamish			
Legalise Cannabis	Robbie Swan			
One Nation	Leo Curtain			
Liberal	Dan Tehan			
Labor	Fiona Mackenzie			
Independent	Bernadine Atkinson			
Total formal votes				
Informal votes				
Turnout				

==== 2022 ====
2022 Australian federal election: Wannon
Party	Candidate	Votes	%	±%
Liberal	Dan Tehan	44,948	44.46	−6.63
Independent	Alex Dyson	19,504	19.29	+9.64
Labor	Gilbert Wilson	19,303	19.09	−6.85
Greens	Hilary McAllister	6,444	6.37	−0.39
United Australia	Craige Kensen	3,308	3.27	−2.27
One Nation	Ronnie Graham	3,275	3.24	+3.24
Independent	Graham Garner	2,346	2.32	+2.32
Liberal Democrats	Amanda Mead	1,973	1.95	+1.95
Total formal votes		101,101	94.75	−1.47
Informal votes		5,603	5.25	+1.47
Turnout		106,704	92.22	−2.84
Notional two-party-preferred count
Liberal	Dan Tehan	59,722	59.07	−1.10
Labor	Gilbert Wilson	41,379	40.93	+1.10
Two-candidate-preferred result
Liberal	Dan Tehan	54,517	53.92	−6.24
Independent	Alex Dyson	46,584	46.08	+46.08
Liberal hold				

Alluvial diagram for preference flows in the seat of Wannon in the 2022 federal election. indicates at what stage the winning candidate had over 50% of the votes and was declared the winner.

=== Elections in the 2010s ===
==== 2019 ====
2019 Australian federal election: Wannon
Party	Candidate	Votes	%	±%
Liberal	Dan Tehan	53,094	51.11	+0.69
Labor	Maurice Billi	27,150	26.13	−3.87
Independent	Alex Dyson	10,797	10.39	+10.39
Greens	Zephlyn Taylor	6,590	6.34	−1.86
United Australia	Joshua Wallace	6,258	6.02	+6.02
Total formal votes		103,889	96.15	+0.55
Informal votes		4,161	3.85	−0.55
Turnout		108,050	94.31	−1.18
Two-party-preferred result
Liberal	Dan Tehan	62,733	60.38	+1.23
Labor	Maurice Billi	41,156	39.62	−1.23
Liberal hold		Swing	+1.23	

==== 2016 ====
2016 Australian federal election: Wannon
Party	Candidate	Votes	%	±%
Liberal	Dan Tehan	47,513	53.23	−0.50
Labor	Michael Barling	27,411	30.71	+1.18
Greens	Thomas Campbell	7,264	8.14	+1.71
Independent	Michael McCluskey	4,048	4.54	+4.54
Independent	Bernardine Atkinson	3,019	3.38	+3.38
Total formal votes		89,255	96.04	+0.03
Informal votes		3,681	3.96	−0.03
Turnout		92,936	93.73	−1.88
Two-party-preferred result
Liberal	Dan Tehan	52,625	58.96	−1.11
Labor	Michael Barling	36,630	41.04	+1.11
Liberal hold		Swing	−1.11	

==== 2013 ====
2013 Australian federal election: Wannon
Party	Candidate	Votes	%	±%
Liberal	Dan Tehan	47,392	53.73	+8.29
Labor	Michael Barling	26,044	29.53	−1.79
Greens	Tim Emanuelle	5,668	6.43	+0.20
Palmer United	Bradley Ferguson	3,519	3.99	+3.99
Sex Party	Chris Johnson	2,455	2.78	+2.78
Family First	Craig Haberfield	1,957	2.22	−0.10
Christians	Therese Corbett	1,167	1.32	+1.32
Total formal votes		88,202	96.01	+1.18
Informal votes		3,665	3.99	−1.18
Turnout		91,867	95.68	+0.34
Two-party-preferred result
Liberal	Dan Tehan	52,984	60.07	+4.41
Labor	Michael Barling	35,218	39.93	−4.41
Liberal hold		Swing	+4.41	

==== 2010 ====
2010 Australian federal election: Wannon
Party	Candidate	Votes	%	±%
Liberal	Dan Tehan	38,813	46.62	−5.94
Labor	Judith McNamara	24,502	29.43	−6.74
Greens	Lisa Owen	5,016	6.03	−0.95
Independent	James Purcell	4,652	5.59	+5.59
Independent	Katrina Rainsford	4,066	4.88	+4.88
Independent	Ralph Leutton	2,582	3.10	+3.10
Family First	Jahzeel Concepcion	1,795	2.16	−2.13
Independent	Allan Marsh	1,080	1.30	+1.30
Independent	Robert O'Brien	745	0.89	+0.89
Total formal votes		83,251	94.68	−2.73
Informal votes		4,676	5.32	+2.73
Turnout		87,927	95.30	−1.10
Two-party-preferred result
Liberal	Dan Tehan	47,697	57.29	−0.18
Labor	Judith McNamara	35,554	42.71	+0.18
Liberal hold		Swing	−0.18	

=== Elections in the 2000s ===
==== 2007 ====
2007 Australian federal election: Wannon
Party	Candidate	Votes	%	±%
Liberal	David Hawker	44,834	52.56	−5.27
Labor	Antony Moore	30,852	36.17	+4.32
Greens	Lisa Owen	5,953	6.98	+2.63
Family First	Daniel Pech	3,663	4.29	+1.31
Total formal votes		85,302	97.41	+0.79
Informal votes		2,266	2.59	−0.79
Turnout		87,568	96.33	+0.38
Two-party-preferred result
Liberal	David Hawker	49,020	57.47	−4.90
Labor	Antony Moore	36,282	42.53	+4.90
Liberal hold		Swing	−4.90	

==== 2004 ====
2004 Australian federal election: Wannon
Party	Candidate	Votes	%	±%
Liberal	David Hawker	48,687	57.83	+5.61
Labor	Robert John McAlpine	26,816	31.85	−1.85
Greens	Gillian Blair	3,663	4.35	+0.66
Family First	Ruth Hazelton	2,508	2.98	+2.98
Independent	Leigh McDonald	1,555	1.85	−0.20
Democrats	Kerre Willsher	806	0.96	−2.02
Citizens Electoral Council	Robert Barwick	149	0.18	+0.18
Total formal votes		84,184	96.62	+0.36
Informal votes		2,944	3.38	−0.36
Turnout		87,128	95.95	−0.55
Two-party-preferred result
Liberal	David Hawker	52,504	62.37	+3.14
Labor	Robert John McAlpine	31,680	37.63	−3.14
Liberal hold		Swing	+3.14	

==== 2001 ====
2001 Australian federal election: Wannon
Party	Candidate	Votes	%	±%
Liberal	David Hawker	40,366	52.39	+3.32
Labor	Richard Morrow	25,648	33.29	+2.08
Greens	Gillian Blair	2,764	3.59	+3.59
Democrats	Amanda Packer	2,296	2.98	−3.49
One Nation	Olive Schmidt	2,136	2.77	−4.92
Independent	Leigh McDonald	1,760	2.28	+2.28
Lower Excise Fuel	Ricky Witney	1,194	1.55	+1.55
Independent	Robert O'Brien	878	1.14	−1.24
Total formal votes		77,042	96.13	−1.11
Informal votes		3,098	3.87	+1.11
Turnout		80,140	97.29	
Two-party-preferred result
Liberal	David Hawker	45,921	59.58	+2.14
Labor	Richard Morrow	31,120	40.42	−2.14
Liberal hold		Swing	+2.14	

=== Elections in the 1990s ===
==== 1998 ====
1998 Australian federal election: Wannon
Party	Candidate	Votes	%	±%
Liberal	David Hawker	37,570	49.07	−8.43
Labor	Mia Vitue	23,897	31.21	−2.21
One Nation	Simon Edge	5,889	7.69	+7.69
Democrats	Maggie Lindop	4,957	6.47	−2.60
Reform	Leigh McDonald	2,427	3.17	+3.17
Independent	Robert O'Brien	1,824	2.38	+2.38
Total formal votes		76,564	97.24	−0.76
Informal votes		2,170	2.76	+0.76
Turnout		78,734	96.79	−0.72
Two-party-preferred result
Liberal	David Hawker	43,981	57.44	−4.87
Labor	Mia Vitue	32,583	42.56	+4.87
Liberal hold		Swing	−4.87	

==== 1996 ====
1996 Australian federal election: Wannon
Party	Candidate	Votes	%	±%
Liberal	David Hawker	44,695	57.50	+1.55
Labor	Richard Morrow	25,978	33.42	−2.61
Democrats	Maggie Lindop	7,051	9.07	+7.00
Total formal votes		77,724	98.00	+0.54
Informal votes		1,587	2.00	−0.54
Turnout		79,311	97.52	+0.20
Two-party-preferred result
Liberal	David Hawker	48,312	62.31	+2.79
Labor	Richard Morrow	29,222	37.69	−2.79
Liberal hold		Swing	+2.79	

==== 1993 ====
1993 Australian federal election: Wannon
Party	Candidate	Votes	%	±%
Liberal	David Hawker	40,819	55.46	−1.55
Labor	Richard Morrow	26,846	36.47	+5.70
Independent	John Philpot	1,963	2.67	+2.67
Democrats	Donald Anderson	1,534	2.08	−6.85
Independent	Les Hemingway	1,234	1.68	+1.68
Independent	David Wilson	746	1.01	+1.01
Natural Law	Yasmin Horsham	462	0.63	+0.63
Total formal votes		73,604	97.45	−0.27
Informal votes		1,926	2.55	+0.27
Turnout		75,530	97.31	
Two-party-preferred result
Liberal	David Hawker	43,608	59.27	−3.39
Labor	Richard Morrow	29.967	40.73	+3.39
Liberal hold		Swing	−3.39	

==== 1990 ====
1990 Australian federal election: Wannon
Party	Candidate	Votes	%	±%
Liberal	David Hawker	41,104	57.0	+1.6
Labor	Phillip Sawyer	22,187	30.8	−4.1
Democrats	Allan Thompson	6,441	8.9	+2.3
Call to Australia	Terry Winter	2,376	3.3	+3.3
Total formal votes		72,108	97.7	
Informal votes		1,682	2.3	
Turnout		73,790	96.6	
Two-party-preferred result
Liberal	David Hawker	45,125	62.7	+1.2
Labor	Phillip Sawyer	26,885	37.3	−1.2
Liberal hold		Swing	+1.2	

=== Elections in the 1980s ===
==== 1987 ====
1987 Australian federal election: Wannon
Party	Candidate	Votes	%	±%
Liberal	David Hawker	38,838	60.2	+1.8
Labor	Kevin Watt	21,478	33.3	+1.3
Democrats	Julie Jennings	4,235	6.6	+3.9
Total formal votes		64,551	97.0	
Informal votes		2,019	3.0	
Turnout		66,570	96.8	
Two-party-preferred result
Liberal	David Hawker	40,718	63.1	−2.3
Labor	Kevin Watt	23,829	36.9	+2.3
Liberal hold		Swing	−2.3	

==== 1984 ====
1984 Australian federal election: Wannon
Party	Candidate	Votes	%	±%
Liberal	David Hawker	36,748	58.4	−3.0
Labor	Nancy Genardini	20,130	32.0	−1.8
National	Betty Gee	3,294	5.2	+5.2
Democrats	Kathleen May	1,683	2.7	−2.5
Democratic Labor	Bill Verhoef	1,115	1.8	+1.8
Total formal votes		62,970	95.3	
Informal votes		3,096	4.7	
Turnout		66,066	96.5	
Two-party-preferred result
Liberal	David Hawker	41,198	65.4	+1.9
Labor	Nancy Genardini	21,755	34.6	−1.9
Liberal hold		Swing	+1.9	

==== 1983 by-election ====
Wannon by-election, 1983
Party	Candidate	Votes	%	±%
Liberal	David Hawker	26,631	41.6	−16.0
Labor	Nancy Genardini	23,069	36.1	−1.1
National	Roger Hallam	14,290	22.3	+22.3
Total formal votes		63,990	99.2	+0.5
Informal votes		527	0.8	−0.5
Turnout		64,517	92.9	−4.1
Two-party-preferred result
Liberal	David Hawker	38,930	60.8	+1.1
Labor	Nancy Genardini	25,060	39.2	−1.1
Liberal hold		Swing	+1.1	

==== 1983 ====
1983 Australian federal election: Wannon
Party	Candidate	Votes	%	±%
Liberal	Malcolm Fraser	37,792	57.6	−0.8
Labor	Nancy Genardini	24,359	37.2	+2.1
Democrats	Harold Jeffrey	3,416	5.2	+1.1
Total formal votes		65,567	98.7	
Informal votes		865	1.3	
Turnout		66,432	97.0	
Two-party-preferred result
Liberal	Malcolm Fraser		59.7	−1.5
Labor	Nancy Genardini		40.3	+1.5
Liberal hold		Swing	−1.5	

==== 1980 ====
1980 Australian federal election: Wannon
Party	Candidate	Votes	%	±%
Liberal	Malcolm Fraser	37,680	58.4	+1.7
Labor	Keith Wilson	22,670	35.1	+4.1
Democrats	Bernhard Kruger	2,625	4.1	−1.7
Independent	Joseph Young	1,546	2.4	−6.9
Total formal votes		64,521	98.3	
Informal votes		1,089	1.7	
Turnout		65,610	96.5	
Two-party-preferred result
Liberal	Malcolm Fraser		61.2	−4.4
Labor	Keith Wilson		38.8	+4.4
Liberal hold		Swing	−4.4	

=== Elections in the 1970s ===
==== 1977 ====
1977 Australian federal election: Wannon
Party	Candidate	Votes	%	±%
Liberal	Malcolm Fraser	35,640	56.7	−2.8
Labor	Andrew Frost	19,483	31.0	−4.2
Democratic Labor	John Casanova	4,125	6.6	+1.3
Democrats	Thelma Trayling	3,617	5.8	+5.8
Total formal votes		62,865	98.5	
Informal votes		968	1.5	
Turnout		63,833	97.2	
Two-party-preferred result
Liberal	Malcolm Fraser		65.6	+1.2
Labor	Andrew Frost		34.4	−1.2
Liberal hold		Swing	+1.2	

==== 1975 ====
1975 Australian federal election: Wannon
Party	Candidate	Votes	%	±%
Liberal	Malcolm Fraser	33,290	63.3	+8.5
Labor	Keith Wilson	16,521	31.4	−5.9
Democratic Labor	John Casanova	2,804	5.3	−1.4
Total formal votes		52,615	99.0	
Informal votes		539	1.0	
Turnout		53,154	97.4	
Two-party-preferred result
Liberal	Malcolm Fraser		68.2	+6.8
Labor	Keith Wilson		31.8	−6.8
Liberal hold		Swing	+6.8	

==== 1974 ====
1974 Australian federal election: Wannon
Party	Candidate	Votes	%	±%
Liberal	Malcolm Fraser	28,117	54.8	+8.7
Labor	Ted Garth	19,133	37.3	−3.7
Democratic Labor	John Casanova	3,431	6.7	−1.3
Australia	Peter Hopgood	581	1.1	+1.1
Total formal votes		51,262	98.9	
Informal votes		582	1.1	
Turnout		51,844	97.2	
Two-party-preferred result
Liberal	Malcolm Fraser		61.4	+5.4
Labor	Ted Garth		38.6	−5.4
Liberal hold		Swing	+5.4	

==== 1972 ====
1972 Australian federal election: Wannon
Party	Candidate	Votes	%	±%
Liberal	Malcolm Fraser	21,760	46.1	−5.2
Labor	Ted Garth	19,375	41.0	+3.9
Democratic Labor	Adrian McInerney	3,800	8.0	−3.6
Independent	Linden Cameron	2,284	4.8	+4.8
Total formal votes		47,219	99.3	
Informal votes		319	0.7	
Turnout		47,538	97.9	
Two-party-preferred result
Liberal	Malcolm Fraser	26,445	56.0	−5.7
Labor	Ted Garth	20,774	44.0	+5.7
Liberal hold		Swing	−5.7	

=== Elections in the 1960s ===
==== 1969 ====
1969 Australian federal election: Wannon
Party	Candidate	Votes	%	±%
Liberal	Malcolm Fraser	23,711	51.3	−2.5
Labor	Kenneth Ginifer	17,175	37.1	+5.9
Democratic Labor	Maurice Purcell	5,355	11.6	−3.4
Total formal votes		46,241	98.9	
Informal votes		496	1.1	
Turnout		46,737	97.3	
Two-party-preferred result
Liberal	Malcolm Fraser		61.7	−5.7
Labor	Kenneth Ginifer		38.3	+5.7
Liberal hold		Swing	−5.7	

==== 1966 ====
1966 Australian federal election: Wannon
Party	Candidate	Votes	%	±%
Liberal	Malcolm Fraser	23,220	53.3	+1.4
Labor	Cyril Primmer	13,800	31.7	−1.3
Democratic Labor	Terence Callander	6,514	15.0	−0.1
Total formal votes		43,534	98.6	
Informal votes		629	1.4	
Turnout		44,163	97.3	
Two-party-preferred result
Liberal	Malcolm Fraser		66.9	+1.3
Labor	Cyril Primmer		33.1	−1.3
Liberal hold		Swing	+1.3	

==== 1963 ====
1963 Australian federal election: Wannon
Party	Candidate	Votes	%	±%
Liberal	Malcolm Fraser	22,503	51.9	+3.5
Labor	Cyril Primmer	14,307	33.0	−2.2
Democratic Labor	Terence Callander	6,549	15.1	−1.3
Total formal votes		43,359	99.5	
Informal votes		237	0.5	
Turnout		43,596	97.2	
Two-party-preferred result
Liberal	Malcolm Fraser		65.6	+1.8
Labor	Cyril Primmer		34.4	−1.8
Liberal hold		Swing	+1.8	

==== 1961 ====
1961 Australian federal election: Wannon
Party	Candidate	Votes	%	±%
Liberal	Malcolm Fraser	20,833	48.4	+0.2
Labor	Jack Stanford	15,162	35.2	−1.1
Democratic Labor	Terence Callander	7,069	16.4	+0.9
Total formal votes		43,064	98.9	
Informal votes		463	1.1	
Turnout		43,527	96.8	
Two-party-preferred result
Liberal	Malcolm Fraser	27,466	63.8	+1.5
Labor	Jack Stanford	15,598	36.2	−1.5
Liberal hold		Swing	+1.5	

=== Elections in the 1950s ===
==== 1958 ====
1958 Australian federal election: Wannon
Party	Candidate	Votes	%	±%
Liberal	Malcolm Fraser	20,550	48.2	−0.7
Labor	Jack Stanford	15,501	36.3	+0.7
Democratic Labor	Terence Callander	6,614	15.5	+0.0
Total formal votes		42,665	98.8	
Informal votes		534	1.2	
Turnout		43,199	97.1	
Two-party-preferred result
Liberal	Malcolm Fraser	25,591	62.3	+3.0
Labor	Jack Stanford	16,074	37.7	−3.0
Liberal hold		Swing	+3.0	

==== 1955 ====
1955 Australian federal election: Wannon
Party	Candidate	Votes	%	±%
Liberal	Malcolm Fraser	19,911	48.9	−1.9
Labor	Roy Cundy	14,522	35.6	−13.6
Labor (A-C)	Terence Callander	6,322	15.5	+15.5
Total formal votes		40,755	98.3	
Informal votes		687	1.7	
Turnout		41,442	96.7	
Two-party-preferred result
Liberal	Malcolm Fraser	24,183	59.3	+8.5
Labor	Roy Cundy	16,572	40.7	−8.5
Liberal hold		Swing	+8.5	

==== 1954 ====
1954 Australian federal election: Wannon
Party	Candidate	Votes	%	±%
Labor	Don McLeod	18,509	50.02	−1.1
Liberal	Malcolm Fraser	18,492	49.98	+1.1
Total formal votes		37,001	100	
Informal votes		186	0.5	
Turnout		37,187	97.1	
Labor hold		Swing	−1.1	

==== 1951 ====
1951 Australian federal election: Wannon
Party	Candidate	Votes	%	±%
Labor	Don McLeod	18,427	51.1	+4.0
Liberal	Dan Mackinnon	17,601	48.9	+12.0
Total formal votes		36,028	99.2	
Informal votes		299	0.8	
Turnout		36,327	97.6	
Labor gain from Liberal		Swing	+1.9	

=== Elections in the 1940s ===
==== 1949 ====
1949 Australian federal election: Wannon
Party	Candidate	Votes	%	±%
Labor	Don McLeod	16,905	47.1	−4.6
Liberal	Dan Mackinnon	13,235	36.9	+9.1
Country	Helena Marfell	5,716	15.9	−1.5
Total formal votes		35,856	99.1	
Informal votes		312	0.9	
Turnout		36,168	97.8	
Two-party-preferred result
Liberal	Dan Mackinnon	18,203	50.8	+3.8
Labor	Don McLeod	17,653	49.2	−3.8
Liberal gain from Labor		Swing	+3.8	

==== 1946 ====
1946 Australian federal election: Wannon
Party	Candidate	Votes	%	±%
Labor	Don McLeod	24,387	47.3	−4.1
Liberal	Dan Mackinnon	15,262	29.6	+11.0
Country	Leonard Rodda	11,955	23.1	+1.5
Total formal votes		51,604	98.9	
Informal votes		551	1.1	
Turnout		52,155	96.9	
Two-party-preferred result
Labor	Don McLeod	26,409	51.2	−2.9
Liberal	Dan Mackinnon	25,195	48.8	+2.9
Labor hold		Swing	−2.9	

==== 1943 ====
1943 Australian federal election: Wannon
Party	Candidate	Votes	%	±%
Labor	Don McLeod	25,609	51.4	+2.8
Country	Leonard Rodda	10,778	21.6	+21.6
United Australia	John Menadue	9,248	18.6	−23.6
Ind. United Australia	Thomas Scholfield	4,190	8.4	+8.4
Total formal votes		49,825	98.9	
Informal votes		555	1.1	
Turnout		50,380	98.3	
Two-party-preferred result
Labor	Don McLeod		54.1	+0.4
United Australia	John Menadue		45.9	−0.4
Labor hold		Swing	+0.4	

==== 1940 ====
1940 Australian federal election: Wannon
Party	Candidate	Votes	%	±%
Labor	Don McLeod	24,533	48.6	+9.3
United Australia	Thomas Scholfield	21,271	42.2	+4.9
Independent Country	John Crawford	2,490	4.9	+4.9
Independent	Jabez Potts	2,164	4.3	+4.3
Total formal votes		50,458	98.8	
Informal votes		624	1.2	
Turnout		51,082	96.2	
Two-party-preferred result
Labor	Don McLeod	27,098	53.7	+5.0
United Australia	Thomas Scholfield	23,360	46.3	−5.0
Labor gain from United Australia		Swing	+5.0	

=== Elections in the 1930s ===
==== 1937 ====
1937 Australian federal election: Wannon
Party	Candidate	Votes	%	±%
Labor	Don McLeod	19,520	39.3	+6.9
United Australia	Thomas Scholfield	18,526	37.3	+0.7
Country	Robert Rankin	11,618	23.4	−6.6
Total formal votes		49,664	98.6	
Informal votes		700	1.4	
Turnout		50,364	96.6	
Two-party-preferred result
United Australia	Thomas Scholfield	25,489	51.3	−3.7
Labor	Don McLeod	24,175	48.7	+3.7
United Australia hold		Swing	−3.7	

==== 1934 ====
1934 Australian federal election: Wannon
Party	Candidate	Votes	%	±%
United Australia	Thomas Scholfield	16,488	37.7	+2.0
Labor	Don McLeod	14,515	33.2	−1.5
Country	Henry Bailey	12,703	29.1	−0.5
Total formal votes		43,706	98.6	
Informal votes		604	1.4	
Turnout		44,310	95.5	
Two-party-preferred result
United Australia	Thomas Scholfield	24,014	54.9	−7.4
Labor	Don McLeod	19,692	45.1	+7.4
United Australia hold		Swing	−7.4	

==== 1931 ====
1931 Australian federal election: Wannon
Party	Candidate	Votes	%	±%
United Australia	Thomas Scholfield	15,205	35.7	−12.3
Labor	John McNeill	14,772	34.7	−17.3
Country	Arthur Rodgers	12,627	29.6	+29.6
Total formal votes		42,604	98.9	
Informal votes		469	1.1	
Turnout		43,073	96.8	
Two-party-preferred result
United Australia	Thomas Scholfield	26,546	62.3	+14.3
Labor	John McNeill	16,058	37.7	−14.3
United Australia gain from Labor		Swing	+14.3	

=== Elections in the 1920s ===
==== 1929 ====
1929 Australian federal election: Wannon
Party	Candidate	Votes	%	±%
Labor	John McNeill	21,338	52.0	+4.8
Nationalist	Arthur Rodgers	19,720	48.0	−4.8
Total formal votes		41,058	98.7	
Informal votes		541	1.3	
Turnout		41,599	97.0	
Labor gain from Nationalist		Swing	+4.8	

==== 1928 ====
1928 Australian federal election: Wannon
Party	Candidate	Votes	%	±%
Nationalist	Arthur Rodgers	21,016	52.8	+10.3
Labor	John McNeill	18,807	47.2	+4.9
Total formal votes		39,823	98.2	
Informal votes		742	1.8	
Turnout		40,565	95.7	
Nationalist hold		Swing	−1.2	

==== 1925 ====
1925 Australian federal election: Wannon
Party	Candidate	Votes	%	±%
Nationalist	Arthur Rodgers	16,678	42.5	+8.8
Labor	John McNeill	16,610	42.3	+1.2
Country	David Anderson	5,995	15.3	−9.9
Total formal votes		39,283	98.4	
Informal votes		640	1.6	
Turnout		39,923	95.1	
Two-party-preferred result
Nationalist	Arthur Rodgers	21,218	54.0	+4.8
Labor	John McNeill	18,065	46.0	−4.8
Nationalist gain from Labor		Swing	+4.8	

==== 1922 ====
1922 Australian federal election: Wannon
Party	Candidate	Votes	%	±%
Labor	John McNeill	10,795	41.1	−4.1
Nationalist	Arthur Rodgers	8,841	33.7	−18.3
Country	David Gibson	6,625	25.2	+22.4
Total formal votes		26,261	96.8	
Informal votes		872	3.2	
Turnout		27,133	67.5	
Two-party-preferred result
Labor	John McNeill	13,334	50.8	+4.9
Nationalist	Arthur Rodgers	12,927	49.2	−4.9
Labor gain from Nationalist		Swing	+4.9	

=== Elections in the 1910s ===
==== 1919 ====
1919 Australian federal election: Wannon
Party	Candidate	Votes	%	±%
Nationalist	Arthur Rodgers	14,806	54.1	−0.7
Labor	John Collins	12,577	45.9	+0.7
Total formal votes		27,383	99.1	
Informal votes		261	0.9	
Turnout		27,644	79.3	
Nationalist hold		Swing	−0.7	

==== 1917 ====
1917 Australian federal election: Wannon
Party	Candidate	Votes	%	±%
Nationalist	Arthur Rodgers	15,597	54.8	+1.2
Labor	Egerton Holden	12,888	45.2	−1.2
Total formal votes		28,485	98.3	
Informal votes		506	1.7	
Turnout		28,991	83.3	
Nationalist hold		Swing	+1.2	

==== 1914 ====
1914 Australian federal election: Wannon
Party	Candidate	Votes	%	±%
Liberal	Arthur Rodgers	16,079	53.6	−0.6
Labor	Neil Mackinnon	13,902	46.4	+0.6
Total formal votes		29,981	98.4	
Informal votes		480	1.6	
Turnout		30,461	85.9	
Liberal hold		Swing	−0.6	

==== 1913 ====
1913 Australian federal election: Wannon
Party	Candidate	Votes	%	±%
Liberal	Arthur Rodgers	16,286	54.2	+7.8
Labor	John McDougall	13,773	45.8	−7.8
Total formal votes		30,059	98.5	
Informal votes		467	1.5	
Turnout		30,526	83.6	
Liberal gain from Labor		Swing	+7.8	

==== 1910 ====
1910 Australian federal election: Wannon
Party	Candidate	Votes	%	±%
Labour	John McDougall	11,977	55.0	+2.2
Liberal	Samuel Cooke	9,797	45.0	−2.2
Total formal votes		21,744	98.8	
Informal votes		262	1.2	
Turnout		22,036	75.5	
Labour hold		Swing	+2.2	

=== Elections in the 1900s ===
==== 1906 ====
1906 Australian federal election: Wannon
Party	Candidate	Votes	%	±%
Labour	John McDougall	9,151	52.8	+15.2
Anti-Socialist	Arthur Robinson	8,179	47.2	+3.8
Total formal votes		17,330	96.3	
Informal votes		664	3.7	
Turnout		17,994	63.8	
Labour gain from Anti-Socialist		Swing	+5.7	

==== 1903 ====
1903 Australian federal election: Wannon
Party	Candidate	Votes	%	±%
Free Trade	Arthur Robinson	5,323	43.4	−1.4
Labour	Thomas White	4,611	37.6	+37.6
Protectionist	Patrick Hogan	2,318	18.9	−8.5
Total formal votes		12,252	98.3	
Informal votes		215	1.7	
Turnout		12,467	54.0	
Free Trade hold		Swing	−5.6	

==== 1901 ====
1901 Australian federal election: Wannon
Party	Candidate	Votes	%	±%
Free Trade	Samuel Cooke	3,088	44.8	+44.8
Ind. Protectionist	Leo Cussen	1,913	27.8	+27.8
Protectionist	Louis Horwitz	1,890	27.4	+27.4
Total formal votes		6,891	99.1	
Informal votes		60	0.9	
Turnout		6,951	61.8	
Free Trade win		(new seat)		
