= Woolstores in Geelong =

The wool industry emerged as one of the first businesses in the new colony of Australia. Its growth had a significant influence on the development of Geelong, which became a prominent hub for wool sales and exports. Geelong's strategic location and the ambitious endeavours of local merchants made it an ideal centre for shipping Australian wool worldwide. To accommodate the thriving industry, large storage facilities were constructed throughout Geelong for the handling, assessment, sale, and transportation of wool bales from Victoria and beyond.

As the wool industry declined, the original purpose of these buildings became obsolete, leading to neglect and some being demolished. However, the surviving structures have found new purposes, serving a variety of functions. This adaptive reuse allows the city to continue its development while still honouring its rich heritage.

== The Woolstore's Architecture ==
Before the 1850s, wool storage in Geelong was fragmented, and only a few merchants exclusively dealt with wool. However, with the increasing economic significance of wool, local wool brokers recognised the need for centralised auctions and sales in Geelong. C.J. Denny played a prominent role in initiating collective action to establish wool auctions in the city. He proposed a set of objectives to establish a local wool market in Geelong, which included:

1. Concentrating a sufficient number of bales of all wools intended for public sale in one location, allowing owners to compare the condition of their clips and facilitate ready and rapid examination and purchase.
2. Attracting buyers from various parties by offering a substantial quantity and quality of wool at each sale
3. Sorting the wool into lots to broaden the pool of potential buyers.
4. Avoiding the expenses associated with transporting wool from the Melbourne wool warehouse through re-shipment

These objectives influenced the design of the woolstores constructed in Geelong. Subsequent stores had to meet specific requirements such as location, lighting, space, size, handling facilities, and ventilation. In 1857, C.J. Dennys conducted the first wool auction in Geelong. As the wool industry expanded, a considerable number of modern woolstores were constructed, modified, and expanded to accommodate the growing demand.

=== Dennys Lascelles & Co. ===
In 1872, the Denny's Lascelles bluestone Woolstore was constructed. The building's design was a collaboration between architect Jacob Pitman, who designed the basement, and Jonathan Coulson, who designed the rest of the building. The Woolstore had dimensions of 132 x 64 ft.

Windows were incorporated on all sides of the building to allow for well-lit passages between double rows of bales. This design also provided adequate ventilation. The cellar, utilised for the sale of hides and skins, featured a cement floor, and the windows ensured suitable temperatures throughout the year. The show floor, measuring 129 x 61 ft, was a significant element of the building. The walls and ceilings were painted pale grey to control lighting, enabling buyers and growers to inspect products under optimal visibility conditions. The woolstore was positioned on a slight incline, facilitating the loading and unloading of waggons on the ground floor.

The 1872 Woolstore was the first building in Victoria designed to encompass the storage, inspection, and marketing of wool in a single operation. Upon completion, it became the second-largest store in the colony. Over time, extensions were added to the bluestone building, including a mansard tower in 1889, which featured minor variations in detailing.

In 1880, an additional building was erected west of the original structure on Brougham Street. While incorporating elements of the original design, this store was constructed using rendered cement, a material commonly used during that era. The Woolstore was intentionally misaligned with the 1872 facade to create the illusion of a two-story building, although it actually had three stories.

In 1910, a significant extension made of reinforced concrete was added to the original 1872 building. The new store was designed by Edward Giles Stone, known for his innovative design approach that influenced trends into the 1920s. The most notable feature was the bow string truss roof system, consisting of a 55 x 52-metre concrete roof span without intermediate columns. The sawtooth roof trusses, passing through the curved concrete structure, allowed ample natural light to enter the building, enhancing visibility on the new show floor. Despite being listed on several heritage registers, the building, formerly known as the Denny Lascelles Woolstore but later called the Bow Truss Building, was controversially demolished in the 1990s.

=== Strachan & Co. ===
Strachan & Co. had a longstanding involvement in the wool industry, dating back to 1840. Their Woolstore complex stands in contrast to the Denny's Lascelles buildings, located adjacent to it. In 1889, a two-story brick Woolstore was built, featuring a façade with five bays and segmental arch-headed windows. The load-bearing walls of the building were made of red brick and topped with a simple parapet. This design directly influenced the subsequent construction of woolstores within the complex. In 1896, a three-story section was added to the south of the original building, facing Moorabool Street. In 1925, an additional extension was built to encompass the entire frontage of Moorabool St. and Corio Terrace. The final addition to the complex was completed in 1954. Although the construction of the complex took place over a period of 65 years, the stylistic features remained consistent. This uniformity gives the group of buildings a cohesive appearance, forming a complete entity despite the extended construction timeline.

=== Dalgety & Co. ===
The first Dalgety & Co. Woolstore was constructed in 1891, designed by the Geelong architecture firm Laird and Buchan. It was a two-story brick and render building located on Gheringhap Street. The design of the 1891 Woolstore featured a two-story warehouse and office building without a basement. It had solid brick walls and a timber roof, floor, and structural system. This design served as the model for subsequent woolstores built by Dalgety & Co. on the site. In 1896, an additional floor consisting of a brick show floor was added to the 1891 Woolstore, mimicking the original structure in nearly every aspect. In 1901, another woolstore was constructed using red brick, similar to Strachan's woolstore. However, its design differed significantly. The north-east side of the Woolstore had small windows, while the façade featured giant arched panels of brickwork, creating a unified appearance. This design closely resembled Woolstores built in Sydney in the late 1890s. The overall form and scale of the store were similar to the 1891 building, but with the addition of a basement.

In 1940, a three-story brick building with a basement was erected at the corner of Gheringhap and Brougham streets. A new façade was constructed along the entire length of Gheringhap Street, resulting in the original exterior of the 1891 building being refaced with red brick. This alteration was consistent with the design of the new Woolstores built in the 1950s and 1960s. The 1940 Woolstore had some distinctive features, including a spacious show floor capable of accommodating 55,000 bales of wool. It incorporated large sliding doors on the west and south facades to allow for ventilation and temperature regulation. The ceiling height was significantly increased, and the use of steel columns and roof trusses reduced the number of columns in the space to a single row of seven in the centre. The sawtooth roof form was retained, but on a larger scale.

== Social Context ==
=== The rise of the woolstore ===
Geelong's wool stores played a significant role in the city's development as a commercial centre and supported Victoria's pastoral and agricultural interests, particularly the wool industry. The first Australian wool was sold in London at Garraway's Coffee House in 1821, where businessmen would gather for auctions of various goods. Between 1830 and 1850, Australian wool exports saw a substantial increase from 892 metric tonnes to 18,791 metric tonnes.

The rapid growth of the wool industry brought wealth to pastoralists and created a need for local spaces to store and sell wool for shipping. In 1840, James Strachan constructed Geelong's first woolstore, and in 1857, Charles Dennys conducted the first wool auction in the city, demonstrating the potential for a local wool trade. The industry's expansion also led to a rapid increase in Geelong's population, transforming the small town into a bustling seaport. Between 1841 and 1843, the population grew from 454 to 2,065.

Initially, the growth of large wool firms in Geelong was limited by available resources. However, by the 1870s, significant investments from British banks and finance companies had greatly supported the industry, solidifying its position as Australia's major export. As a result, numerous expanded wool stores were constructed in Geelong and across the country. The construction of the Dennys, Lascelles Ltd woolstore in 1872, which now houses the National Wool Museum, serves as a symbol of this economic expansion and represents the popular design employed in the construction of woolstores in Geelong and the wider region.

Geelong faced competition from Melbourne, which considered itself the primary centre for wool exports and sales. Charles Dennys fueled this rivalry by initiating wool sales in Geelong, asserting that making it the centre would save costs for local agriculturalists, who would no longer need to transport their wool to Melbourne. By the 1890s, wool accounted for two-thirds of Australia's exports, providing a significant number of employment opportunities, particularly in and around the woolstores.

Victoria had a vibrant union movement, with workers advocating for improved conditions and wages, including those in the wool stores. Key unions involved in Geelong's woolstores included the Amalgamated Fellmongers Woolsorters & Woolscourers Union of Australia, the Wool and Basil Workers' Federation of Australia, the Federated Storemen and Packers' Union of Australia, and the Wool & Skin Stores Employees Union. Strikes by wharf workers and shearers in the late nineteenth century disrupted the industry, affecting the shipping of wool.

=== The decline of the industry ===
The wool industry faced significant challenges during the two World Wars and an economic depression, impacting labour availability, demand, and wool prices. While there was a brief boom in the 1950s, the industry faced threats from the increasing popularity of synthetic fibres, rising production costs, and declining international prices. To address these issues, the Australian government implemented a protectionist reserve price scheme in 1974. Under this scheme, the government would purchase the wool clip if prices fell below a certain level. The scheme operated until 1991, when the accumulation of excess wool posed a threat to the Australian economy. As a result, the industry underwent contraction, and the focus of the Australian economy shifted towards mineral extraction.

== Functions of a Woolstore ==
The Dennys Lascelles Wool and Produce Warehouse was a pioneering building in Victoria designed to enable the storage, inspection, and marketing of wool in a unified manner. When it was completed, it became the second-largest store in the colony. These storage buildings also introduced specialized features such as raising the ground floor to a suitable loading level from the street front, which created a basement space beneath for activities like wool pressing.

=== Receive ===
Starting in the 1870s, wool, skins, and hides were transported to the woolstores and underwent sorting, storage, and cataloguing processes. Initially, transportation primarily relied on bullock drays and waggons and occasionally riverboats, which brought baled wool from remote stations. Later on, rail and road transport became more prominent. Wool continued to be transported via various means, including land, sea, and rail. Upon its arrival at the stores, specialised sorters and packers would categorise the wool based on its destination.

=== House ===
In multi-story "wool warehouses," bales were transported on trolleys and moved using steam or hydraulic lifts. They were then dropped down chutes. In modern one-story wool stores, vehicles were used to move the wool. Enhancements made to woolstores in the 1940s included the implementation of metal wool gates to separate the wool, the introduction of electric lifts and elevators, and the incorporation of wool presses and wool drops.

Wool brokers charged growers a fee for handling and selling the wool in the store. In addition to these services, brokers also provided various other services such as credit facilities, banking, advice, and assistance with hotel and travel bookings. They served as a connection between wool growers and the wider world of commerce and international trade. Since the stores were visited by clients, including buyers and suppliers, they were required to offer a reasonable level of amenities and were not simply regarded as large sheds. Larger woolstores even included changing rooms and showers for the convenience of buyers and growers, as well as offices for wool valuers.

=== Store ===
Before classing, the process of "skirting" took place, aiming to achieve a uniform fleece by removing any wool that did not match the majority of the fleece. Once a fleece had been handled, baled, and pressed, further skirting was not feasible. Skirting and packing contributed to the overall value of the wool clip. Classing, which involved grading the skirted fleece as a whole, was a crucial task that required sound knowledge acquired through experience and practise. Wool was categorised into lines based on its class. The initial separation of woollen and woven fleece was performed by wool sorters, after which the fleece was graded according to several factors:

- Quality refers to the diameter of the fibre, which is indicated by its evenness and number of crimps.
- Soundness: evaluating the tensile strength and the ability to withstand tension during the combing process
- Length of staple: Well-defined lengths for long, medium, and short wools were established for each quality or count.
- Condition: Assessing the amount of yoke and moisture adhering to the wool fibre

Other significant factors included:

- Colour: Pure white wools provided the widest range of usability.
- Style: Factors such as character, colour clarity, bloom or lustre, regularity, elasticity, distinctiveness of crimp, pliancy, softness, and fullness contributed to the seven distinct style standards in wool: Choice or extra super, super, good to super, good, average, average, and inferior.

After the sorting and classing of greasy wool, the next step was scouring, which involved removing impurities like grease or yolk, sweat, and earthy matter through washing in a soap and weak alkali solution. Carbonising was necessary if burrs, seeds, or other types of vegetable matter couldn't be eliminated through carding, combing, and subsequent processes. Carding utilised fine wire teeth to remove foreign matter and smooth and straighten the fibres. The mesh was then condensed into a soft rope form called "silver." Backwashing and gilling were performed to further straighten the fibres, and sometimes oil was added as a substitute for the lost natural grease. Finally, combing straightened the long fibres and eliminated any short and imperfect fibres. The rejected wool collected was known as "noil." The result of the process was a continuous length of fibre known as a "top," which was ready for packing.

=== Display ===
Once the bulk classers had sorted the wool, it was transported to bins and examined by an overlooker before being formed into sale bales and displayed using wool lifts. The design of the warehouse show floors ensured ample space and light, enabling easy separation of wool from different districts. One method employed for this purpose was the use of sawtooth roofs. The construction of new Woolstores in 1872 elevated Geelong to a comparable status with Melbourne. These woolstores were specifically designed to meet the requirements of wool selling, encompassing storage, inspection, viewing, and sales.

The availability of such facilities allowed wool owners to readily compare the condition of their clips, while prospective buyers could efficiently assess the wool lots. On sale days, the wool was transported to the top floor, which provided bright natural light and was opened up for potential buyers to examine. Sampling often took place on the show floor, where wool was taken and evaluated. The raw wool was then sold at auction and subsequently dispatched via road, rail, or sea.

=== Dispatch ===
In Geelong, wool was transported to the beach for loading onto ships and onward delivery. When preparing wool for despatch, it was necessary to ensure it was packed securely to withstand the sea voyage and subsequent handling. Initially, this task was carried out by sorters and packers, but from the 1950s onward, professional wool classers took over the responsibility. Bales awaiting delivery were stacked within the warehouse. Local orders were promptly fulfilled. The initial storemen resided on the woolstore premises, and these woolstores were strategically located near various transportation facilities.

== Geelong and the wool industry: then and now ==
The decline and fall of the wool industry is a riches-to-rags tale of an economic power that was not only the backbone of the national economy, but also a part of Australian culture and folklore. In the mid-twentieth century, Australia boasted the greatest wool industry in the world. Yet toward the end of the century, the industry declined to be a third of its former size because of flawed economic, fiscal, and industrial government policies.

The city of Geelong is closely associated with the wool industry. For many years the city was known as the 'wool centre of the world'. Sheep farming began here in 1835 and numerous Woolstores were opened from the second half of the century onward. Today, Geelong stands as an emerging health, education and advanced manufacturing hub. Despite experiencing the drawbacks of losing much of its heavy manufacturing, it positions itself as one of the leading non-capital Australian cities.

=== Significance of the Geelong Woolstores Historic Area ===
The Geelong Woolstores Historic Area is one of coherence and integrity. The Area represents an important aspect of the process of settling the land in Victoria. For Australians as inhabitants of an industrial nation, the last century may be considered as the most relevant period of their past since the specific changes made during that period provide the foundation of their present society. Significant Woolstore groups do exist elsewhere in Australia, but they do not match the group qualities of the Geelong Woolstores and were not specifically erected for the storage, handling and marketing of wool.

Thus, the former Dennys Lascelles Woolstores can be seen as quintessentially Australian as a manifestation of the wool industry. These buildings meet criterion A (Importance to the course, or pattern, of Victoria's cultural history), F (Importance in demonstrating a high degree of creative or technical achievement at a particular period), and H (Special association with the life or works of a person, or group of persons, of importance in Victoria's history). They can be associated with the fifth topic of the Victorian Historical Themes (“Building Victoria’s Industries and Workforce”, subtheme “wool processing”).

== Revitalisation of the Woolstores Conservation Area and Waterfront ==
With the decline of the wool industry, the Woolstores and associated commercial and industrial buildings turned obsolete. Consequently, since the early 1980s the Waterfront and Woolstores Conservation Area entered into a revitalisation process. In that sense, new uses and contemporary creative interpretation practices have been promoted in the buildings. The aim of this project is also to preserve the inner city's landscape and its unique architectural character, since the area shares an architectural integrity that gives a local distinctiveness to the city and its port.

Moreover, to preserve the aesthetic and historical values of the buildings, as well as the streetscape, the Greater Geelong Planning Scheme established some strategies and policy guidelines, making sure that any “external alterations (would) make a positive contribution to the built form and (the) amenity of the area”; while at the same time raising awareness that such constructions are a legacy for future generations that represent the community's identity. For instance, the former Dalgety & Co. Woolstore became the Deakin University Waterfront campus in a project that won the President's Award for Recycled Buildings in 1997. This event became the starting point of Geelong's business central district revival, and signified the arrival of the modern age in the ‘new Geelong’.

The twenty seven buildings situated in the Woolstores Conservation Area have found a new purpose, mainly related to entertainment, education and tourism: seven of them are now restaurants, bars, or event centres, three are part of a shopping mall (Westfield Geelong), two are offices, one is a university (Deakin University), another one a hotel (Bush Inn Hotel), one complex a Museum (National Wool Museum), six buildings were demolished, and the current use of the remaining three is unknown. Geelong's Woolstores Conservation Area was not the only one in Australia to go through these urban reinvention processes. During the last two decades, other Woolstores located in Adelaide, Brisbane, Fremantle, Melbourne, and Sydney have also encountered new uses as apartments, offices and shopping centres.

== A Timeline of Geelong's Woolstores ==
- 1838 - Geelong was proclaimed a town and two stores, the Woolpack Inn and a customs station were opened.
- 1872- Construction of the former Dennys Lascelles wool store in blue stone (Moorabool Street). At the time of its construction, it was the second largest wool store in the colony after Goldsborough & Co. in Melbourne.
- 1889 - The four-storey brick complex of the Strachan, Murray and Shannon Woolstore (now housing the Westfield shopping centre) was constructed.
- 1917 - The George Hague & Co. Woolstores were partially demolished.
- 1970-80 - The wool industry weakened. The buildings turned obsolete due to changes in wool selling and handling.
- 1988 - Creation of the National Wool Museum in the former Dennys Lascelles Woolstore in Moorabool street.
- 1990- Demolition of the Bow Truss Building (built in 1910) in a controversial decision.
- 1996- Establishment of the Deakin University Waterfront campus in the former Dalgety & Co. Woolstore.
- 1998- Opening of the Westfield shopping centre in three former woolstores. Today, only the façade of the Strachan Woolstores Complex remains.
- 2000 onwards- Redevelopment of former Woolstores and associated buildings into commodity amenities
