= FGA =

FGA may refer to:

- Fellow of the Ghana Academy of Arts and Sciences
- Fellow of the Gemmological Association
- Fibrinogen alpha chain, encoded by the FGA gene
- Field and Game Australia
- Fit/gap analysis
- First generation antipsychotic
- Fleshgod Apocalypse, an Italian symphonic death metal band
- Florida Gulf & Atlantic Railroad
- Flugestone acetate
- Fondements de la Géometrie Algébrique, a mathematics text
- Foundation for Government Accountability, an American lobbying organization
