= Dan Mackinnon =

Australian politician

Dan Mackinnon CBE
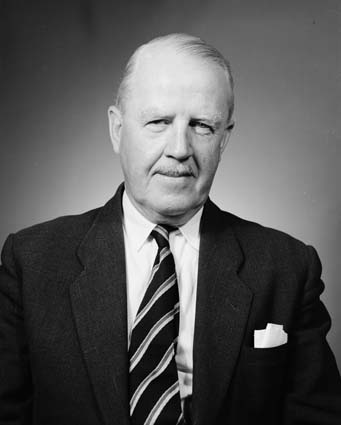

Member of the Australian Parliament for Wannon
- In office 10 December 1949 – 28 April 1951
- Preceded by: Don McLeod
- Succeeded by: Don McLeod

Member of the Australian Parliament for Corangamite
- In office 29 August 1953 – 31 October 1966
- Preceded by: Allan McDonald
- Succeeded by: Tony Street

Personal details
- Born: Ewen Daniel Mackinnon; 11 February 1903 Prahran, Victoria, Australia
- Died: 7 June 1983 (aged 80) South Yarra, Victoria, Australia
- Party: Liberal
- Spouse: Muriel Jean Russell (m. 1933)
- Relations: Donald Mackinnon (father); Donald Mackinnon (brother); Brice Bunny (grandfather); Rupert Bunny (uncle)
- Education: New College, Oxford
- Occupation: Grazier

Military service
- Allegiance: Australia
- Branch/service: Australian Army
- Years of service: 1940–1944
- Rank: Major
- Unit: Volunteer Defence Corps

Ewen Daniel Mackinnon CBE (11 February 1903 – 7 June 1983) was an Australian politician and diplomat. He was a member of the Liberal Party and served in the House of Representatives from 1949 to 1951 and from 1953 to 1966. He later served as Australian ambassador to Argentina from 1967 to 1970.

== Early life ==
Mackinnon was born on 11 February 1903 in Prahran, Victoria. He was the son of Hilda Eleanor Marie (née Bunny) and Donald Mackinnon. His father was a barrister and member of the Victorian Legislative Assembly. His paternal grandfather Brice Bunny was a colonial judge and his uncle Rupert Bunny was a professional painter.

Mackinnon was educated at Geelong Grammar School and went on to New College, Oxford, where his father and older brother Donald had previously studied. He graduated Bachelor of Arts in 1924. After returning to Australia he worked on his family's pastoral leases, including as a jackeroo on Marion Downs Station in Queensland and Marida Yallock in Victoria. In 1933 he was appointed as a director of Strachan & Co. Ltd, a woolbroking firm and stock and station agency which was eventually taken over by Dennys Lascelles Ltd.

== Military service ==
Mackinnon served in the Citizen Military Forces from 1938 to 1940, where he was an adjutant and assistant brigade major in the part-time 4th Light Horse Regiment. In 1940 he transferred to the Australian Imperial Force as a captain in the 7th Division Cavalry Regiment. Mackinnon served in the Middle East from 1940 to 1942. He later transferred to the 2/31st Battalion where he was discharged with the rank of major in 1944.

== Politics ==
Mackinnon was elected to the House of Representatives at the 1949 federal election, winning the seat of Wannon from the incumbent Australian Labor Party member Don McLeod. He had previously stood unsuccessfully against McLeod at the 1946 election. He was defeated by McLeod after a single term at the 1951 election.

Mackinnon was re-elected to the House of Representatives at the 1953 Corangamite by-election, following the death of the incumbent Liberal MP Allan McDonald. He was re-elected on five further occasions, retiring at the 1966 election. Mackinnon's parliamentary speeches "focused on country roads and telephone services, and other interests of primary producers". He was also a long-serving chairman of the Joint Committee on Foreign Affairs and served as chairman from 1962 to 1963.

== Diplomacy ==
In 1967, Mackinnon was appointed as Australian ambassador to Argentina by the Holt government. His older brother Donald Mackinnon had previously served as ambassador to Brazil and had business ties to South America dating back to the 1920s. Mackinnon was also appointed non-resident ambassador to Uruguay in 1968 and non-resident ambassador to Peru in 1969. He was primarily based in Buenos Aires but regularly spent time in Peru and Uruguay. In 1969 he was hospitalised after being knocked down by a car outside his residence.

== Personal life ==
In 1933, Mackinnon married Muriel Russell, with whom he had two children. After their marriage they settled on Langi Willi, the Russell family's estate near Skipton, Victoria. He died on 7 June 1983 in South Yarra, Victoria.

Mackinnon was an elder of the Presbyterian Church of Victoria and served as president of the Melbourne Club in 1972, a position previously held by his father and brother. According to Norman Abjorensen, the author of his entry in the Australian Dictionary of Biography, he was "a bastion of the Victorian establishment".

Parliament of Australia
| Preceded by Don McLeod | Member for Wannon; 1949–1951 | Succeeded by Don McLeod |
| Preceded by Allan McDonald | Member for Corangamite; 1953–1966 | Succeeded by Tony Street |
Diplomatic posts
| Preceded by Kevin Kelly | Australian Ambassador to Argentina; 1967–1970 | Succeeded by Harry Bullock |
