= Field and Game Australia =

Australian non-government organization

Field & Game Australia (FGA) is an Australian non-government organization formed in 1958 for conservation, hunting, and clay target shooting. It is based in Seymour, Victoria.

FGA promotes sustainable utilization and hunting practices aimed at conserving Australia’s native flora and fauna. Each year, FGA volunteers conduct waterfowl counts to help government wildlife managers gather data on waterfowl population numbers and locations. These figures are not published but reported to the Hunting Advisory Committee.

FGA members have built and organized the construction of thousands of nest boxes across Australia. These are monitored regularly, nesting numbers are recorded, and introduced species are removed. This work has been successful in breeding birds and educating the wider community of the importance of wetlands and their native inhabitants.

== History ==
The Victorian Field and Game Association was established in 1958 at Sale, Victoria. The name comes from field sportsmen and game management abbreviated to "Field & Game". Field & Game was formed by hunters who were concerned at the loss of wetland habitat for the game birds they observed and hunted.

Other resolutions adopted at that first meeting in 1958 were:

- To develop Victorian facilities for game bird hunting by the promotion of conservation and management projects.
- To develop a greater public appreciation of the pleasures and values of game bird hunting.
- To organize a deputation to the Chief Secretary seeking the establishment of a shooter's license to fund game conservation.

At its first meeting the association adopted the following motto- "The wildlife of today is not ours to dispose of as we please. We have it in trust. We must account for it to those who come after". King George VI

The association initially focused on three wetlands: Winton Swamp near Benalla (now Lake Mokoan), Tower Hill in Western Victoria, and Jack Smith Lake in Gippsland.

The association's hunters placed a value on swampland, which at the time was considered to be of little value due to its unsuitability for agriculture. As a part of this, they proposed that regulated water supply from irrigation systems should be available to wetlands.

=== Building Assets for all Australians ===
Members of the association lobbied for the introduction of a shooter's license system that would make funds available for the protection of wetland habitats. Under Sir Henry Bolte's direction, the shooter's license was established in 1959 and provided Victoria's first-ever funds for game and wildlife management. The shooters license raises over $4 million annually for conservation efforts. A new game license introduced in 1990 raises another $1 million annually. Areas of waterfowl habitat were purchased and the Game Research Station at Serendip near Lara was established – the area is now a wetland education centre.

== Organizational structure ==
The FGA has over 15,000 members, over 60 branches and 51 simulated field clay target shooting grounds throughout Australia. FGA volunteers participate in a variety of activities, including wetland rehabilitation and management, shooter education, waterfowl identification courses ("WIT tests"), firearm safety and training, pest and vermin eradication, and organized duck hunts and fox drives.

The individual FGA branches are made up of the members of the national body, and the branches' delegates vote at national meetings. Each branch is an incorporated association, with individual members being entitled to vote at branch meetings. The current chairman of Field & Game Australia (national body) is Russell Bate. Its current patrons include former Prime Minister Malcolm Fraser, former Speaker of the House of Representatives David Hawker and zoologist Prof. Grahame Webb. Former patrons include the late Sir Henry Bolte, and former Victorian Governor the late Sir Rohan Delacombe.

== Legal issues ==
In 2009, Sale Field & Game spokesperson Gary Howard was found guilty in Sale Magistrates Court on the charges of taking and using water without authority, and with interfering with the flow in a waterway. Howard was fined $1500 and ordered to pay costs of $1500. The Heart Morass adjoins Lake Wellington and water taken from the river was beneficial to the environment and did not deprive any other land users or downstream environments. The actions were uncovered by the anti-hunting group Coalition Against Duck Shooting, who monitored Heart Morass after learning that 100 FGA members had paid to hunt on the opening weekend.

In Victoria, following the 2011 duck season where an illegal protester was shot in the face by a shooter and in 2012 when other illegal protesters were charged and prosecuted, regulations were changed to increase public safety. The new public safety regulations were adopted in September 2012 and came into effect from the 2013 season.

== Advocacy of shooter's rights ==
Field and Game Australia represents members interests with government and legal submissions from time to time.

In 2002 the FGA were represented in the High Court in relation to the Yorta Yorta Native Title claim over areas in the Goulburn and Murray Valleys. The Yorta Yorta claim was over 200,000 km^{2} (77,000 sq mi) of land. The Yorta Yorta people gave evidence that they traditionally used the land to camp, hunt, and fish. FGA opposed the claim for exclusive possession as they also used the land to camp hunt and fish.

In 2005–06, the Victorian Environmental Assessment Council (VEAC) proposed five new national parks (Barmah, Gunbower, Lower Goulburn, Warby-Ovens, Leaghur-Koorangie and a significant addition to Murray-Sunset) and five new regional or other parks. This would have significantly reduced availability of public land for camping, fishing and hunting. The proposal would have also restricted boat access to rivers in the area. VEAC's proposals were based on economic assumptions that were shown to be flawed. FGA engaged consultants to challenge the economic assumptions and VEAC's proposals were subsequently rejected by the Victorian Government.

== Accomplishments ==
From 1963 to 1965, the VFGA opposed a proposal by the Victorian Government to drain the Hird and Johnson Wetlands near Kerang. Prior to this event, the organisation has worked to preserve these wetlands.

In 1978, the VFGA won the Victorian Conservation Prize for "the defense of Victoria's wetlands, the preservation of wildlife habitat and development of public awareness". The prize is awarded annually to an organization who has shown notable contributions to conservation over the previous five years. The prize was awarded by the Minister for Conservation, but since the 1980s that prize has been replaced by LandCare Awards.

Research by the VFGA in Victoria during 1992-1993 showed that lead levels in Pacific black duck at Lake Buloke had reached internationally recognized levels dangerous to waterfowl (waterfowl mistakenly ingest lead pellets along with gravels as gastroliths needed to aid their digestion of food). This prompted the VFGA to work with government and support the phase-out of lead shots for waterfowl hunting, which was completed in 2002.

In 2001, FGA founded the Wetland Environmental Taskforce Public Fund (WET) to raise money to protect wetlands. WET purchased the remaining Heart Morass wetlands from a private farm. Much of the wetland had already been drained to create pastures.

== See also ==
- Hunting in Australia
