= James MacKinnon (cricketer) =

Australian cricketer

Personal information
- Full name: James Curdie MacKinnon
- Born: 10 January 1865; Terang, Victoria, Australia
- Died: 5 July 1957 (aged 92); Melbourne, Victoria, Australia
- Batting: Right-handed
- Bowling: Slow left-arm orthodox

Domestic team information
- Years: Team
- 1886–1888: Cambridge University

Career statistics
Competition	First-class
Matches	5
Runs scored	31
Batting average	5.16
100s/50s	–/–
Top score	11*
Balls bowled	524
Wickets	4
Bowling average	59.00
5 wickets in innings	–
10 wickets in match	–
Best bowling	2/39
Catches/stumpings	3/–
- Source: Cricinfo, 22 June 2019

James Curdie MacKinnon (10 January 1865 – 4 July 1957) was an Australian first-class cricketer.

McKinnon was born at Terang, Victoria to Daniel Mackinnon, a member of a well known pioneering pastoral family. He was educated at Geelong Grammar School, before going to England to study at Trinity Hall at the University of Cambridge. While studying at Cambridge he made his debut in first-class cricket for the Gentlemen of England against Cambridge University at Fenner's in 1886. He made his debut for Cambridge University in the same season against Yorkshire at Sheffield, with MacKinnon playing one further match for Cambridge in 1886, followed by two matches in 1887. In five first-class appearances, he scored 31 runs and took 4 wickets. After graduating he returned to Australia and joined the firm Strachan, Murray, and Shannon at Geelong. Following the death of his father, he resigned from the firm to oversee the running of the Marion Downs Station in western Queensland. He later became involved in the running of the Wyangarie Estate in northern New South Wales, where he subdivided the farm into dairy farms that today form the rich dairying area around Kyogle. He also helped to maintain the family venture at Tintaldra Station in Victoria. He served on the council of the Royal Agricultural Society of Victoria and was president of the Melbourne Club in 1938. He died at Melbourne in July 1957, aged 92. His brother, Donald, was a politician.
