= 1953 Corangamite by-election =

A by-election was held for the Australian House of Representatives seat of Corangamite on 29 August 1953. This was triggered by the death of Liberal MP Allan McDonald. A by-election for the seat of Lang was held on the same day.

The by-election was won by Liberal candidate Dan Mackinnon, who had previously served as the member for Wannon from 1949 to 1951.

== Results ==
Corangamite by-election, 1953
Party	Candidate	Votes	%	±%
Liberal	Dan Mackinnon	19,449	52.2	−6.5
Labor	Angus McLean	17,782	47.8	+6.5
Total formal votes		37,231	99.5	
Informal votes		196	0.5	
Turnout		37,427	92.3	
Liberal hold		Swing	−6.5	
