= Arthur Rodgers =

Australian politician (1876–1936)

The Honourable Arthur Rodgers
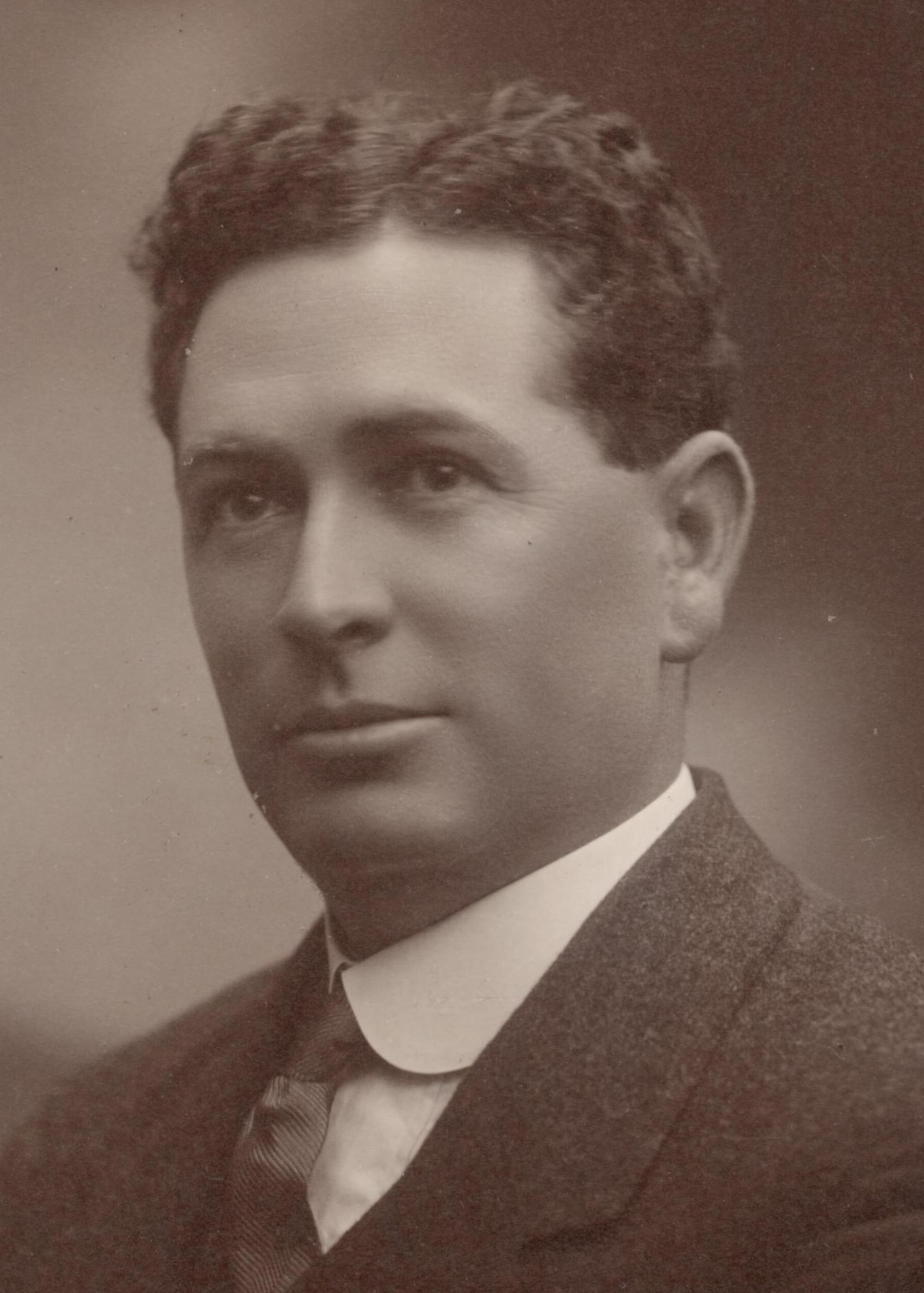

Minister for Trade and Customs
- In office 21 December 1921 – 5 February 1923
- Prime Minister: Billy Hughes
- Preceded by: Walter Massy-Greene
- Succeeded by: Austin Chapman

Member of the Australian Parliament for Wannon
- In office 14 November 1925 – 12 October 1929
- Preceded by: John McNeill
- Succeeded by: John McNeill
- In office 31 May 1913 – 16 December 1922
- Preceded by: John McDougall
- Succeeded by: John McNeill

Personal details
- Born: 20 March 1876 Geelong, Victoria, Australia
- Died: 4 October 1936 (aged 60) Melbourne, Victoria, Australia
- Party: People's (1910–1913); Liberal (1913–1917); Nationalist (1917–?); Country (1931)
- Spouse: Eileen Eleanor Young (m. 1905)
- Occupation: Farmer

Arthur Stanislaus Rodgers (20 March 1876 – 4 October 1936) was an Australian politician. He served in the House of Representatives (1913–1922, 1925–1929) as a Liberal and Nationalist, representing the Victorian seat of Wannon. He was Minister for Trade and Customs in the Hughes government from 1921 to 1923.

== Early life ==
Rodgers was born on 20 March 1876 in Geelong, Victoria. He was the son of Irish immigrant parents Margaret (née Byrne) and Patrick Rodgers; his father was a farmer. From 1889 to 1890 he attended Xavier College, Melbourne, on a government scholarship, returning home after his father's death.

In about 1894, Rodgers acquired land near Horsham, eventually expanding to 1,200 acres (490 ha). He engaged in mixed farming, growing wheat, raising sheep, and breeding horses, both draught and Thoroughbreds. He also worked briefly in the office of a local solicitor and as a manager for Young Bros., a stock and station agency. He married Eileen Eleanor Young in 1905, with whom he had a son and three daughters.

== Politics ==
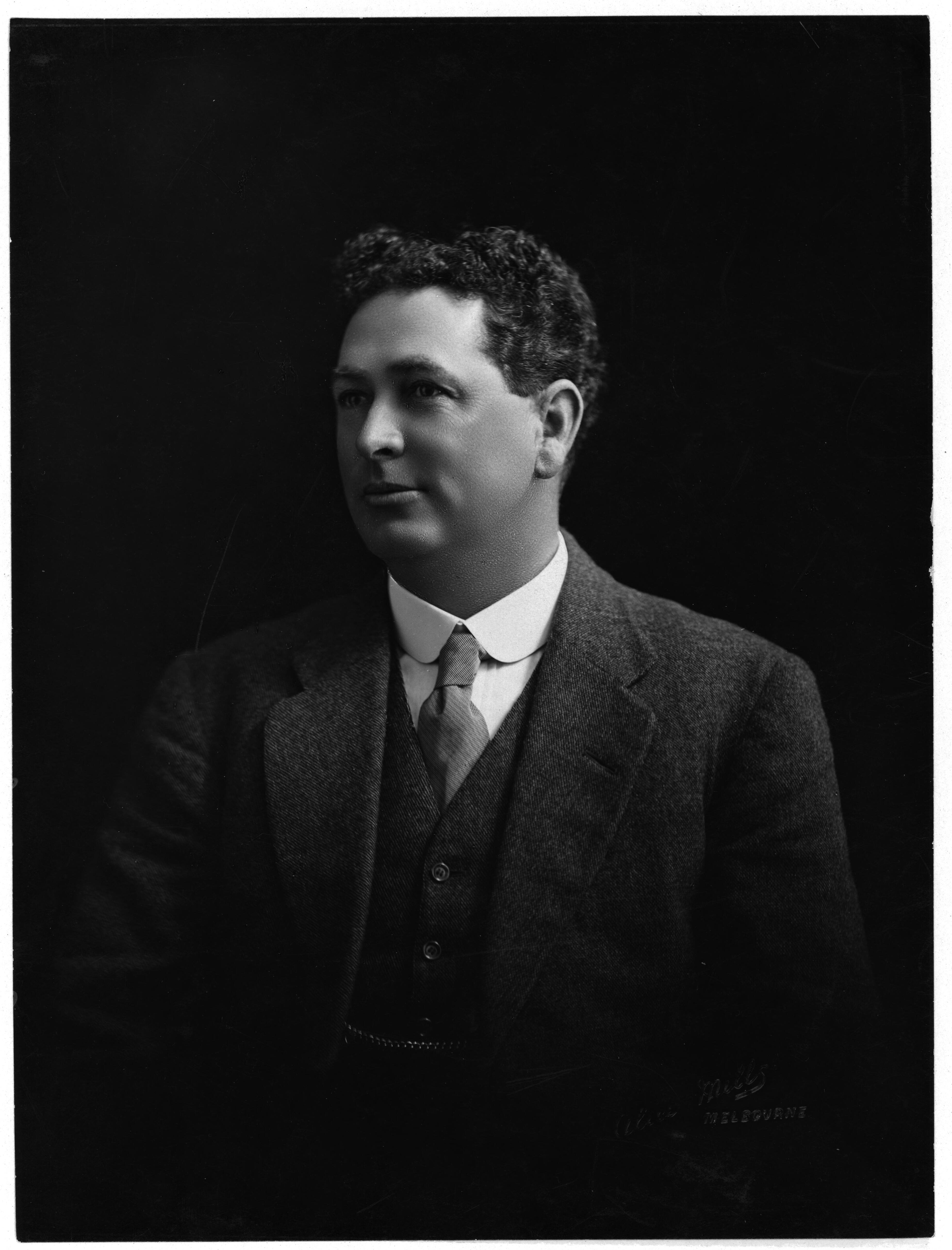
Photograph by Alice Mills

In 1910, Rodgers was involved in the formation of the People's Party, serving as an inaugural vice-president and assisting in drafting the party manifesto. In the lead-up to the 1913 federal election he was endorsed as the Liberal candidate for the seat of Wannon. He campaigned on a platform that included increased migration, a national insurance scheme, sharefarming, and opposition to a land tax. At the election he defeated the incumbent Australian Labor Party (ALP) member, John Keith McDougall.

During World War I, Rodgers organised a fund for returned soldiers titled "Rodgers' Repatriation Scheme", which raised £100,000 (equivalent to $10,795,000 in 2022) for soldier settlement in his electorate. In July 1920 he was appointed as an honorary minister in the Fourth Hughes Ministry, having joined the Nationalist Party in 1917 with the other Liberals. It was initially announced that he would act as assistant treasurer to Joseph Cook. He later acted as Minister for Repatriation in the absence of Edward Millen.

In December 1921, Rodgers was appointed Minister for Trade and Customs in place of Walter Massy-Greene. Due to a miscommunication, he was also under the mistaken impression that he would administer the Department of Health as Massy-Greene had done. As minister, Rodgers organised the creation of advisory bodies to improve the standard of exported produce. In June 1922, he stated the government was considering anti-dumping legislation to prevent the Australian market from being flooded with cheap German goods. He was in favour of a "national brand for all export goods made in Australia", and announced that the government would preference other British Empire countries in negotiating reciprocal trade agreements. He also stated support for greater trade with Asia, qualifying that "the business men could look after the business end of the stick and the Government could help on the financial side".

Rodgers lost his seat to the ALP candidate John McNeill at the 1922 federal election, one of five ministers to be defeated. He remained active in public life, writing to the new prime minister S. M. Bruce to request a royal commission into the War Service Homes Commission. Rodgers re-contested Wannon at the 1925 election and defeated McNeill. He was re-elected in 1928 but lost his seat again to McNeill in 1929. At the 1931 election he stood as a candidate of the Country Party, but both he and McNeill were unsuccessful with the seat being won by Thomas Scholfield of the United Australia Party (UAP).

== Personal life ==
In addition to his farm near Horsham, Rodgers owned a grazing property in Bringenbrong, New South Wales, on the Murray River. In 1932 he co-founded the Primary Producers' Restoration League with barrister Eugene Gorman, to seek debt adjustment for farmers. He was also general manager of Western and Wimmera Land and Pasture Development.

Rodgers suffered from diabetes and died suddenly of coronary vascular disease in Melbourne in 1936. He was buried at Springvale Botanical Cemetery.

Political offices
Preceded by Walter Massy-Greene	Minister for Trade and Customs; 1921–1923	Succeeded by Austin Chapman
Parliament of Australia
Preceded by John McDougall	Member for Wannon; 1913–1922	Succeeded by John McNeill
Preceded by John McNeill	Member for Wannon; 1925–1929	Succeeded by John McNeill
