= Donald Mackinnon =

Australian politician

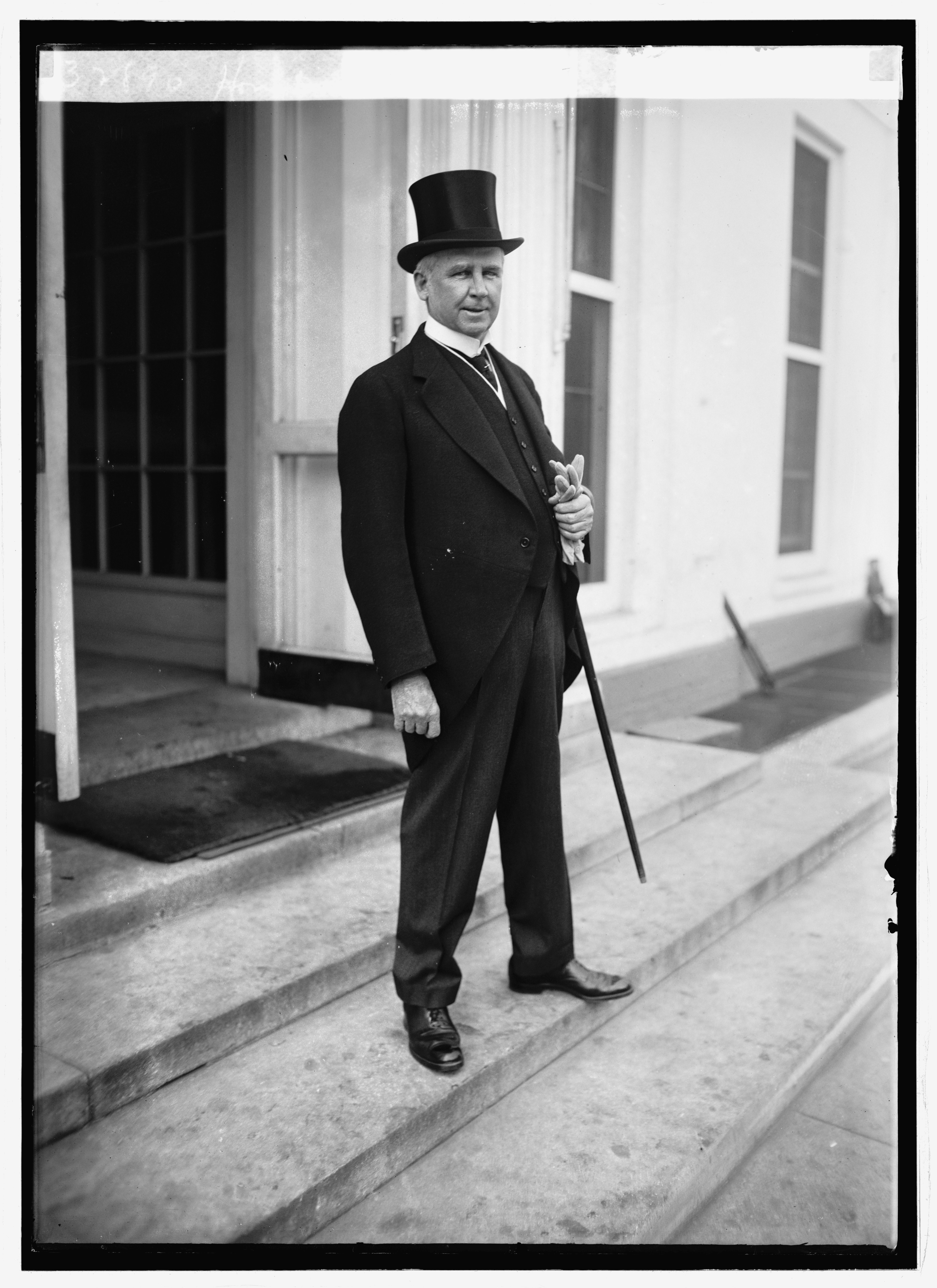
- Mackinnon in 1924
- Born: 29 September 1859; Marida Yallock, Victoria
- Died: 25 April 1932 (aged 72); Toorak, Victoria
- Education: Geelong Grammar School; Melbourne University; New College, Oxford
- Spouse: Hilda Eleanor Marie Bunny
- Children: 5, including Dan
- Relatives: Donald James Mackinnon (grandson); James MacKinnon (cricketer) (brother)

Donald MacKinnon (29 September 1859 – 25 April 1932) was an Australian politician.

== Early life ==
Born at Marida Yallock near Boorcan in Victoria to grazier David Mackinnon and Jane Kinross, both Scottish-born. He was educated at Geelong Grammar School, Melbourne University and New College, Oxford, graduating with a Bachelor of Arts. In 1883 he was called to the English Bar, returning to Victoria to repeat the achievement in 1884. At his father's death in 1889 he took over the family property, and also acquired grazing property in New South Wales and Queensland. On 19 August 1891 he married Hilda Eleanor Marie Bunny, sister of the artist Rupert Bunny; they had five children.

== Politics ==
In 1900 Mackinnon was elected to the Victorian Legislative Assembly as the Liberal member for Prahran, serving as party leader from 1904 to 1907. He was Attorney-General of Victoria and Solicitor-General of Victoria in the William Watt and Alexander Peacock governments. He was defeated in 1920.

After the failure of the first plebiscite on conscription during World War I, Mackinnon was appointed Commonwealth Director-General of Recruiting on 29 November 1916.

== Later life ==
Mackinnon's son Dan was a member of the Australian House of Representatives, and his grandson Donald James was also a Victorian state MP. Mackinnon died in 1932 at Toorak. His brother, James, was a first-class cricketer.

Victorian Legislative Assembly
Preceded by Frederick Gray	Member for Prahran; 1900–1920	Succeeded by Alexander Parker
Political offices
Preceded by William Evans	Attorney-General of Victoria & Solicitor-General of Victoria; 1913 - 1915	Succeeded by Harry Lawson
