= Don McLeod (politician) =

Australian politician

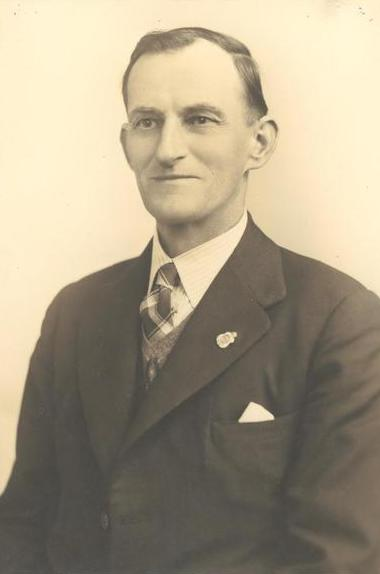

Member of the Australian Parliament for Wannon
- In office 21 September 1940 – 10 December 1949
- Preceded by: Thomas Scholfield
- Succeeded by: Dan Mackinnon
- In office 28 April 1951 – 4 November 1955
- Preceded by: Dan Mackinnon
- Succeeded by: Malcolm Fraser

Personal details
- Born: 29 October 1892 Strathmerton, Victoria
- Died: 22 August 1963 (aged 70)
- Party: Australian Labor Party
- Occupation: Farmer

Donald McLeod (29 October 1892 – 22 August 1963) was an Australian politician. Born in Strathmerton, Victoria, he received a primary education and worked as a farmer before enlisting in the AIF in March 1916. He served as a Gunner in the 36 Australian Heavy Artillery Group until leaving the military in April 1919 to become a soldier settler at Gringegalgona. In 1940, he was elected to the Australian House of Representatives as the Labor member for Wannon. He held the seat until his defeat by Liberal candidate Dan Mackinnon in 1949. He defeated Mackinnon in a rematch two years later. In 1954, he was nearly defeated by Liberal challenger and future Prime Minister Malcolm Fraser, holding onto his seat by only 17 votes. After a redistribution made his seat notionally Liberal, McLeod retired in 1955 and returned to farming. He died in 1963.

Parliament of Australia
Preceded by Thomas Scholfield	Member for Wannon; 1940–1949	Succeeded by Dan Mackinnon
Preceded by Dan Mackinnon	Member for Wannon; 1951–1955	Succeeded by Malcolm Fraser
