= John McNeill (Australian politician) =

Australian politician and trade unionist (1868–1943)

The Honourable John McNeill
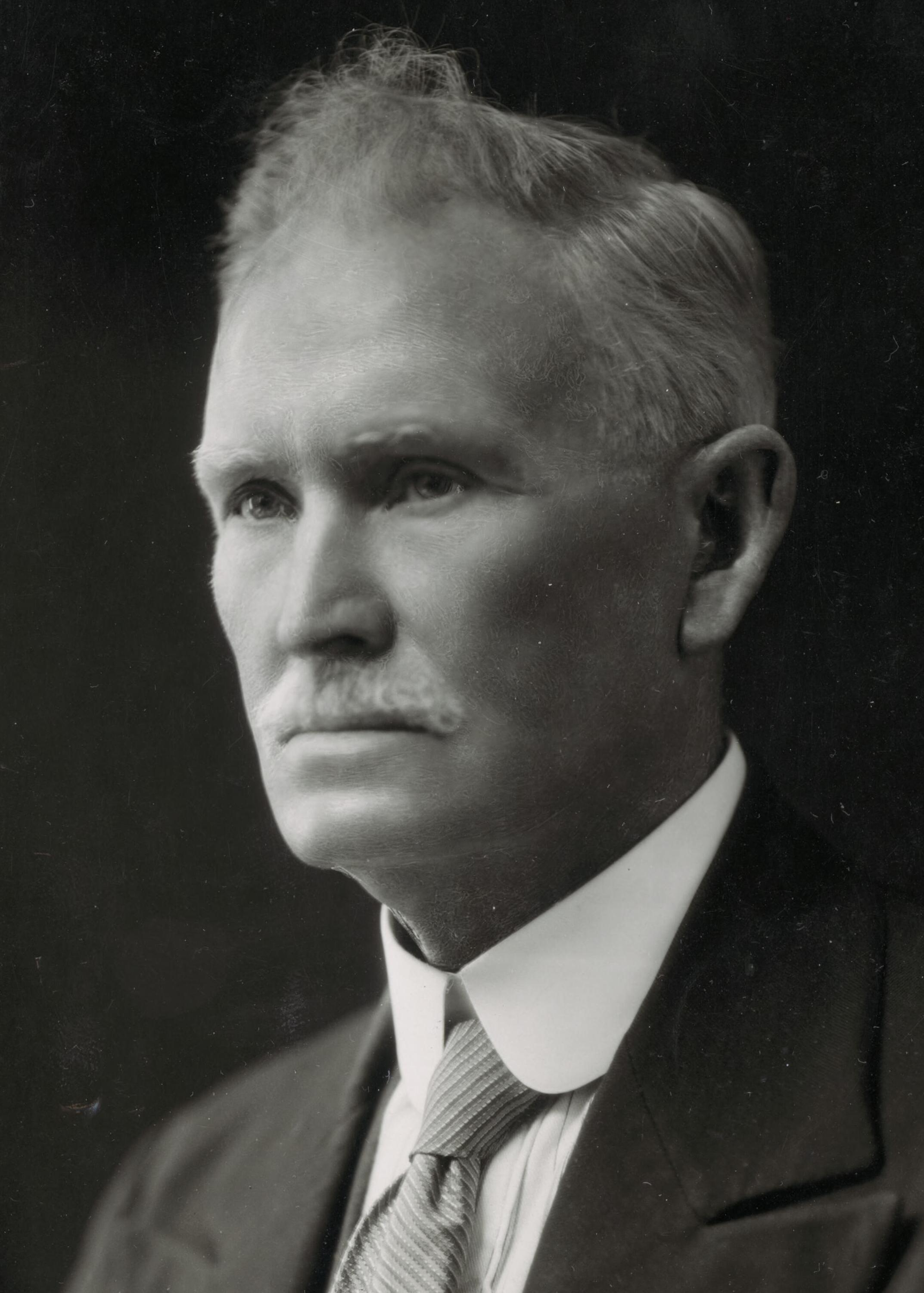

Minister for Health
- In office 3 March 1931 – 6 January 1932
- Prime Minister: James Scullin
- Preceded by: Frank Anstey
- Succeeded by: Charles Marr

Minister for Repatriation
- In office 3 March 1931 – 6 January 1932
- Prime Minister: James Scullin
- Preceded by: Frank Anstey
- Succeeded by: Charles Hawker

Member of the Australian Parliament for Wannon
- In office 12 October 1929 – 19 December 1931
- Preceded by: Arthur Rodgers
- Succeeded by: Thomas Scholfield
- In office 16 December 1922 – 14 November 1925
- Preceded by: Arthur Rodgers
- Succeeded by: Arthur Rodgers

Personal details
- Born: 1868 Tantanoola, South Australia, Australia
- Died: 14 June 1943 (aged 74–75) Coogee, New South Wales, Australia
- Party: Australian Labor Party
- Spouses: Mary Ann Mills (m. 1896–1905) Catherine Scullin (m. 1915)
- Relations: James Scullin (brother-in-law)
- Occupation: Unionist

John James McNeill (1868 – 14 June 1943) was an Australian politician and trade unionist. He was a member of the Australian Labor Party (ALP) and served two terms in the House of Representatives (1922–1925, 1929–1931), representing the Division of Wannon in Victoria. He was Minister for Health and Minister for Repatriation from 1931 to 1932, holding office in the government of his brother-in-law James Scullin.

== Early life ==
McNeill was born in Tantanoola, South Australia. After achieving a primary school education, McNeill worked as a shearer and then became a selector at Woosang. He sold his farm to prospect for gold during the Coolgardie, Western Australia gold rush and then returned to Victoria to farm at Macarthur before becoming an organiser for the Australian Workers' Union (AWU) in western Victoria and the Riverina of New South Wales. He married Mary Ann Mills in 1896, but she died in 1905.

McNeill contested the Victorian Legislative Assembly seat of Glenelg for Australian Labor Party in 1906. In 1908 he tried to farm in Roma, Queensland and then became an AWU organiser in Charleville. From 1913 to 1922 he was secretary of the Victoria-Riverina branch of the AWU. In 1915, he married James Scullin's sister, Catherine.

== Federal Parliament ==
McNeill narrowly won the seat of Wannon in the House of Representatives in 1922 but was beaten in 1925. He won it back in 1929.

On 2 March 1931, dissatisfaction with the economic performance of the Scullin government and internal rivalries within the Labor Caucus resulted in the Caucus declaring all ministerial positions vacant and subsequently a new ministry was elected. McNeill was elected to cabinet and was allocated the portfolios of Health and Repatriation. He kept these positions until the Scullin government resigned on 6 January 1932. He lost his parliamentary seat at the December 1931 general election.

In 1931, The Wimmera Football League best and fairest player award was donated and presented as the John McNeil Medal.

== Later life ==
McNeill was the General President of the Australian Workers' Union from 1939 until his death in the Sydney suburb of Coogee of a coronary occlusion. He was survived by his wife and their two sons, and his two sons and a daughter of his first marriage.

Political offices
Preceded by Frank Anstey	Minister for Health; 1931–1932	Succeeded by Charles Marr
Preceded by Frank Anstey	Minister for Repatriation; 1931–1932	Succeeded by Charles Hawker
Parliament of Australia
Preceded by Arthur Rodgers	Member for Wannon; 1922–1925	Succeeded by Arthur Rodgers
Preceded by Arthur Rodgers	Member for Wannon; 1929–1931	Succeeded by Thomas Scholfield
