= John Keith McDougall =

Australian politician

John McDougall
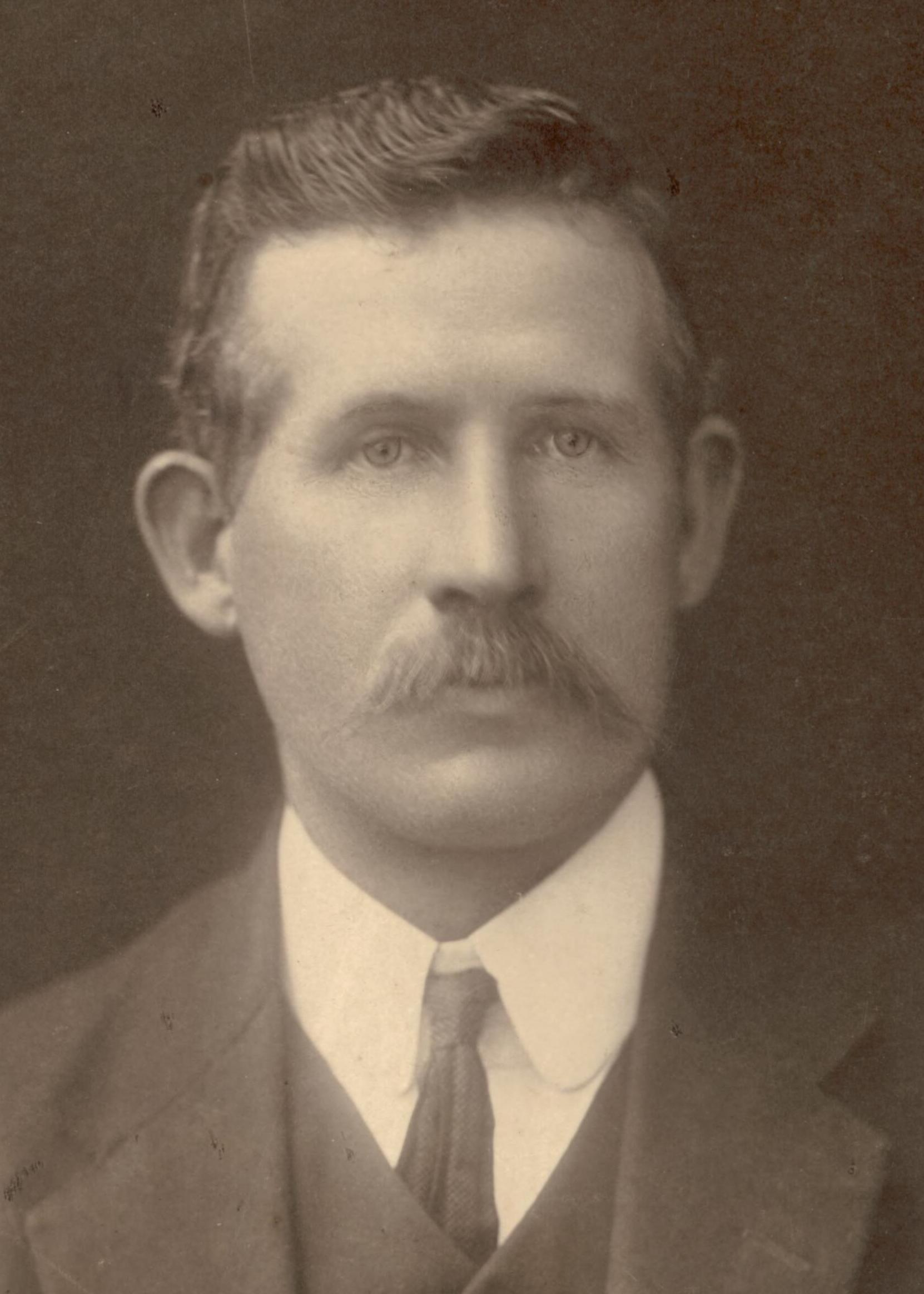

Member of the Australian Parliament for Wannon
- In office 12 December 1906 – 31 May 1913
- Preceded by: Arthur Robinson
- Succeeded by: Arthur Rodgers

Personal details
- Born: 10 August 1867 Learmonth, Victoria
- Died: 11 April 1957 (aged 89) Portland, Victoria
- Party: Australian Labor Party
- Spouse: Margaret Ellen McGennisken
- Occupation: Unionist

John Keith McDougall (10 August 1867 – 11 April 1957), also known as J. K. McDougall, was an Australian politician, poet and Labor activist.

== Early life ==
McDougall was born at Learmonth, Victoria to farmer Donald McDougall and Margaret, née Keith. He attended Rossbridge Common School but left school at the age of 13 to assist on the family farm. His education continued informally, however, and began to develop an interest in politics, having rejected the Presbyterian ministry.

== Politics ==
McDougall joined the Ararat branch of the Political Labor Council in 1903, becoming president in 1904. He stood twice for Ararat Shire Council, succeeding in 1904. In 1906 he was elected to the Australian House of Representatives for the seat of Wannon after a successful campaign targeting the anti-union leanings of the Anti-Socialist sitting member, Arthur Robinson. He rarely spoke in Parliament, but did considerable work for his constituency. McDougall also became associated with King O'Malley and his group of Labor members. McDougall was defeated in Wannon in 1913, largely due to a general swing against Labor and a redistribution, and returned to his farm, running unsuccessfully for Flinders in 1914 and Grampians in 1915 and 1917.

== Later life ==
McDougall was a prolific contributor to Labor press, denouncing capitalism as well as those Labor members of whom he disapproved, including Andrew Fisher, Chris Watson, Ted Theodore, James Scullin, Billy Hughes and Joseph Lyons. Many of these contributions were submitted in verse; five books of McDougall's verse were published, including The trend of the ages and Grass and gossamer, and other verses (1930).

McDougall's poem The White Man's Burden, which denounced war, was used by the Nationalist Party in the 1919 election as evidence of Labor's contempt for servicemen. On 6 December 1919, one week before the election, six returned servicemen, stirred by this rhetoric, lured McDougall from his home and left him in an Ararat street having been tarred and feathered. The poem had been written in 1902.

On 3 March 1908 at Richmond, McDougall had married Margaret Ellen McGennisken, who died in 1952. McDougall retired subsequently to write his memoirs, dying at Ararat on 11 April 1957, survived by two sons and a daughter.

Parliament of Australia
Preceded by Arthur Robinson	Member for Wannon; 1906-1913	Succeeded by Arthur Rodgers
