= Division of Wannon =

Australian federal electoral division

Coordinates: 37.703°S 142.448°E

Wannon Australian House of Representatives Division
- Interactive map of electorate boundaries from the 2025 federal election
- Created: 1901
- MP: Dan Tehan
- Party: Liberal
- Namesake: Wannon River
- Electors: 121,868 (2025)
- Area: 34,270 km^{2} (13,231.7 sq mi)
- Demographic: Rural

The Division of Wannon (/wɒnən/) is an Australian Electoral Division in the state of Victoria.

== History ==
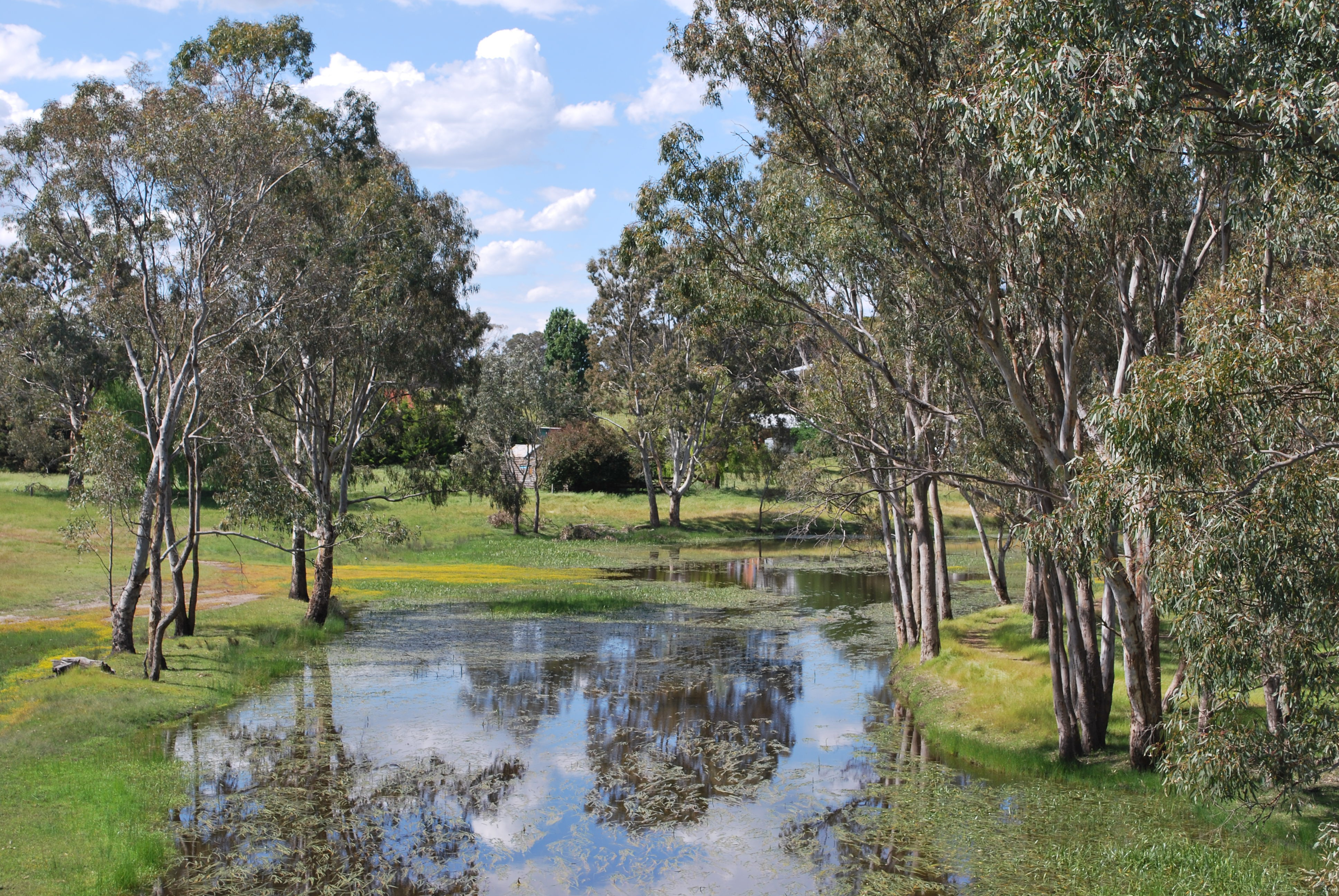
Wannon River, the division's namesake

The division was proclaimed in 1900, and was one of the original 65 divisions to be contested at the first Federal election. The division was named after the Wannon River. For the first half-century after Federation, it regularly traded hands between the Australian Labor Party and the conservative parties. However, a 1955 redistribution removed most of the seat's Labor-friendly territory, and it has been a safe Liberal seat for most of its history since then.

The seat's most notable member was Prime Minister Malcolm Fraser, to date the last prime minister from a country seat. His successor, David Hawker, was Speaker of the Australian House of Representatives during the last term of the Howard Government. Hawker retired in 2010 and was succeeded by Dan Tehan.

== Boundaries ==
Since 1984, federal electoral division boundaries in Australia have been determined at redistributions by a redistribution committee appointed by the Australian Electoral Commission. Redistributions occur for the boundaries of divisions in a particular state, and they occur every seven years, or sooner if a state's representation entitlement changes or when divisions of a state are malapportioned.

The division is located in the south-west of the state, and encompasses most of the Western District of the state. It adjoins the South Australian border in the west, the Bass Strait coast in the south to Anglesea in the east, and extends north to the Grampians. Following the redistribution on 26 July 2021 the division encompasses the towns of Warrnambool, Colac, Portland, Hamilton, and Ararat. The Budj Bim, Great Otway, Lower Glenelg, and Port Campbell National Parks are in the division, as is southern portion of the Grampians National Park.

== Members ==
Image	Member	Party	Term	Notes
	Samuel Cooke (1847–1929)	Free Trade	29 March 1901 – 23 November 1903	Previously a member of the Victorian Legislative Council. Retired
	Arthur Robinson (1872–1945)	Free Trade	16 December 1903 – 1906	Previously held the Victorian Legislative Assembly seat of Dundas. Lost seat. Later elected to the Victorian Legislative Council in 1912
	Arthur Robinson (1872–1945)	Anti-Socialist	1906 – 12 December 1906	Previously held the Victorian Legislative Assembly seat of Dundas. Lost seat. Later elected to the Victorian Legislative Council in 1912
	John McDougall (1867–1957)	Labor	12 December 1906 – 31 May 1913	Lost seat
	Arthur Rodgers (1876–1936)	Liberal	31 May 1913 – 17 February 1917	Served as minister under Hughes. Lost seat
	Arthur Rodgers (1876–1936)	Nationalist	17 February 1917 – 16 December 1922	Served as minister under Hughes. Lost seat
	John McNeill (1868–1943)	Labor	16 December 1922 – 14 November 1925	Lost seat
	Arthur Rodgers (1876–1936)	Nationalist	14 November 1925 – 12 October 1929	Lost seat
	John McNeill (1868–1943)	Labor	12 October 1929 – 19 December 1931	Served as minister under Scullin. Lost seat
	Thomas Scholfield (1894–1964)	United Australia	19 December 1931 – 21 September 1940	Lost seat
	Don McLeod (1892–1963)	Labor	21 September 1940 – 10 December 1949	Lost seat
	Dan Mackinnon (1903–1983)	Liberal	10 December 1949 – 28 April 1951	Lost seat. Later elected to the Division of Corangamite in 1953
	Don McLeod (1892–1963)	Labor	28 April 1951 – 4 November 1955	Retired
	Malcolm Fraser (1930–2015)	Liberal	10 December 1955 – 31 March 1983	Served as minister under Holt, McEwen, Gorton and McMahon. Served as Opposition Leader in 1975. Served as Prime Minister from 1975 to 1983. Resigned to retire from politics
	David Hawker (1949–)	Liberal	7 May 1983 – 19 July 2010	Served as Speaker during the Howard Government. Retired
	Dan Tehan (1968–)	Liberal	21 August 2010 – present	Served as minister under Turnbull and Morrison. Incumbent

== Election results ==
2025 Australian federal election: Wannon
Party	Candidate	Votes	%	±%
Liberal	Dan Tehan	47,312	43.64	−0.59
Independent	Alex Dyson	34,012	31.38	+12.72
Labor	Fiona Mackenzie	11,438	10.55	−9.05
One Nation	Leo Curtain	4,529	4.18	+0.96
Greens	Kate Gazzard	3,427	3.16	−3.50
Legalise Cannabis	Robbie Swan	3,037	2.80	+2.80
Family First	Lee-Ann Elmes	2,065	1.90	+1.90
Trumpet of Patriots	Julie McCamish	1,789	1.65	+1.62
Independent	Bernadine Atkinson	794	0.73	+0.73
Total formal votes		108,403	94.68	−0.11
Informal votes		6,086	5.32	+0.11
Turnout		114,489	94.01	+1.36
Notional two-party-preferred count
Liberal	Dan Tehan	66,038	60.92	+2.27
Labor	Fiona Mackenzie	42,365	39.08	−2.27
Two-candidate-preferred result
Liberal	Dan Tehan	57,749	53.27	−0.23
Independent	Alex Dyson	50,654	46.73	+0.23
Liberal hold		Swing	−0.23	
