= Dan Tehan =

Australian politician (born 1968)

The Honourable Dan Tehan MP
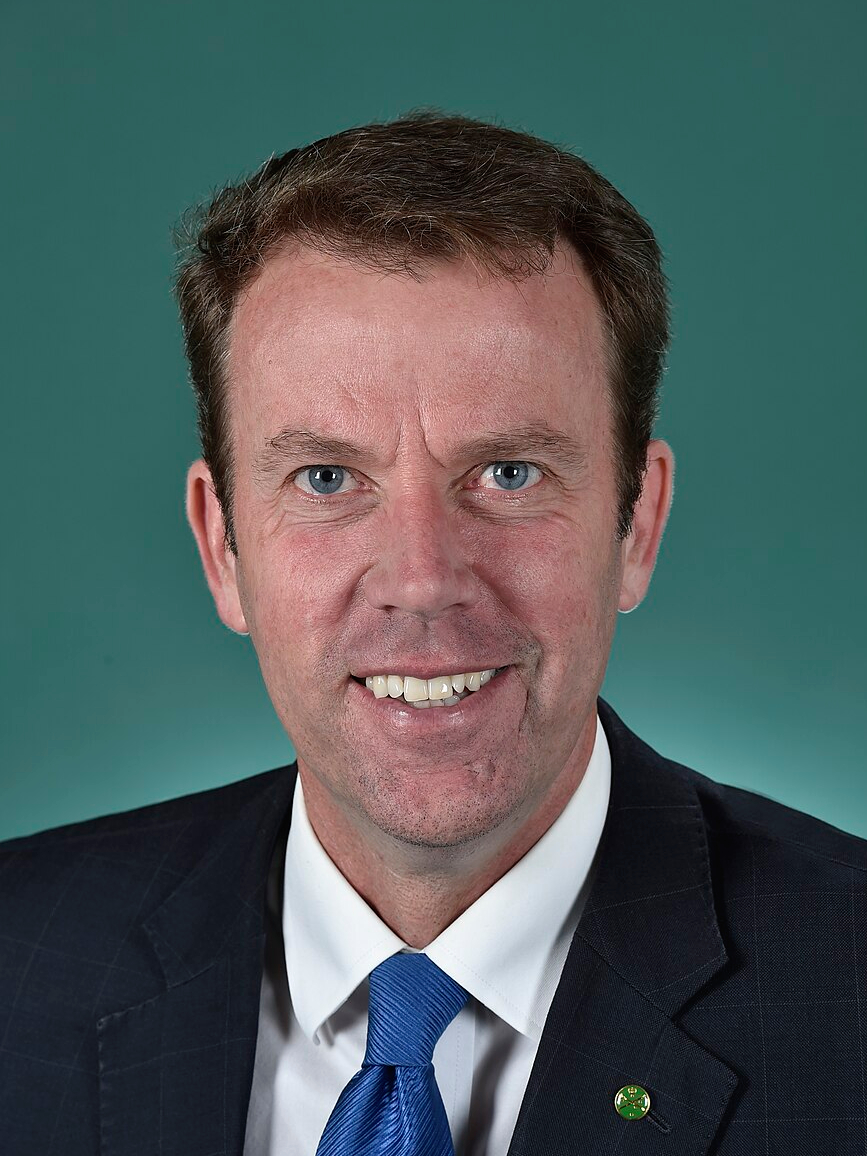
- Official portrait, 2017

Manager of Opposition Business in the House
- Incumbent
- Assumed office 17 February 2026
- Deputy: Kevin Hogan
- Leader: Angus Taylor
- Preceded by: Alex Hawke

Shadow Minister for Energy and Emissions Reduction
- Incumbent
- Assumed office 28 May 2025
- Leader: Sussan Ley; Angus Taylor
- Preceded by: Ted O'Brien (as Shadow Minister for Climate Change and Energy)

Shadow Minister for Resources
- Acting; 30 January 2026 – 12 February 2026
- Leader: Sussan Ley
- Preceded by: Susan McDonald
- Succeeded by: Susan McDonald

Shadow Minister for Immigration and Citizenship
- In office 5 June 2022 – 28 May 2025
- Leader: Peter Dutton; Sussan Ley
- Preceded by: Kristina Keneally
- Succeeded by: Paul Scarr (as Shadow Minister for Immigration and Shadow Minister for Citizenship and Multicultural Affairs)

Member of the Australian Parliament for Wannon
- Incumbent
- Assumed office 21 August 2010
- Preceded by: David Hawker
Ministerial positions
Minister for Trade, Tourism and Investment
In office 18 December 2020 – 23 May 2022
Prime Minister	Scott Morrison
Preceded by	Simon Birmingham
Succeeded by	Don Farrell
Minister for Education
In office 28 August 2018 – 18 December 2020
Prime Minister	Scott Morrison
Preceded by	Simon Birmingham
Succeeded by	Alan Tudge
Minister for Social Services
In office 20 December 2017 – 28 August 2018
Prime Minister	Malcolm Turnbull; Scott Morrison
Preceded by	Christian Porter
Succeeded by	Paul Fletcher
Minister for Defence Personnel
In office 19 July 2016 – 20 December 2017
Prime Minister	Malcolm Turnbull
Preceded by	Marise Payne (as Acting Minister for Defence Materiel and Science)
Succeeded by	Michael McCormack
Minister for Veterans' Affairs
In office 18 February 2016 – 20 December 2017
Prime Minister	Malcolm Turnbull
Preceded by	Stuart Robert
Succeeded by	Michael McCormack
Minister for Defence Materiel
In office 18 February 2016 – 19 July 2016
Prime Minister	Malcolm Turnbull
Preceded by	Marise Payne (as Acting Minister for Defence Materiel and Science)
Succeeded by	Christopher Pyne as Minister for Defence Industry)

Personal details
- Born: Daniel Thomas Tehan; 27 January 1968 (age 58) Melbourne, Victoria, Australia
- Party: Liberal
- Spouse: Sarah Tehan
- Children: 5
- Parent: Marie Tehan (mother)
- Education: University of Melbourne; University of Kent; Monash University
- Occupation: Politician
- Website: Official website

Daniel Thomas Tehan (TEE-an; born 27 January 1968) is an Australian politician who is the Manager of Opposition Business in the House. He has been the member of parliament (MP) for the Victorian division of Wannon since 2010.

Tehan previously held various ministerial positions in the Coalition governments under Malcolm Turnbull and Scott Morrison from 2016 to 2022. He was a member of the Dutton shadow ministry from 2022 to 2025. He was a public servant and political advisor before entering parliament.

== Early life and education ==
Daniel Thomas Tehan was born on 27 January 1968 in Melbourne, the third of six children born to Jim and Marie Tehan (née O'Brien). His mother was elected to the Parliament of Victoria in 1987 and served as a state government minister, while his father was a country vice-president of the Liberal Party of Australia (Victorian Division). Tehan grew up on the family's farming property near Mansfield, Victoria. His paternal grandfather Jim Tehan helped establish the National Farmers' Federation. His mother and aunt both died of Creutzfeldt–Jakob disease.

Tehan attended a Catholic primary school and a public high school in country Victoria before completing his secondary education as a boarder at Xavier College, Melbourne. He holds the degrees of Bachelor of Arts (Hons.) from the University of Melbourne, Master of Foreign Affairs and Trade from Monash University, and Master of International Relations from the University of Kent in England.

== Early career ==
Tehan worked with the Department of Foreign Affairs and Trade from 1995 to 1998 and then was a member of the diplomatic service from 1999 to 2001. He was posted to Mexico City and was also involved with Central America and Cuba. In 2002 he was seconded to the office of Trade Minister Mark Vaile, where he was involved in negotiations on the Australia–United States Free Trade Agreement in 2004.

When Vaile became deputy prime minister in 2005 Tehan remained with him as a senior adviser. He later served as chief of staff to Fran Bailey, the Minister for Small Business and Tourism. After the defeat of the Howard government, he served as director of trade policy and international affairs with the Australian Chamber of Commerce and Industry (2007–2008) and deputy state director of the Liberal Party in Victoria (2008–2009).

== Politics ==
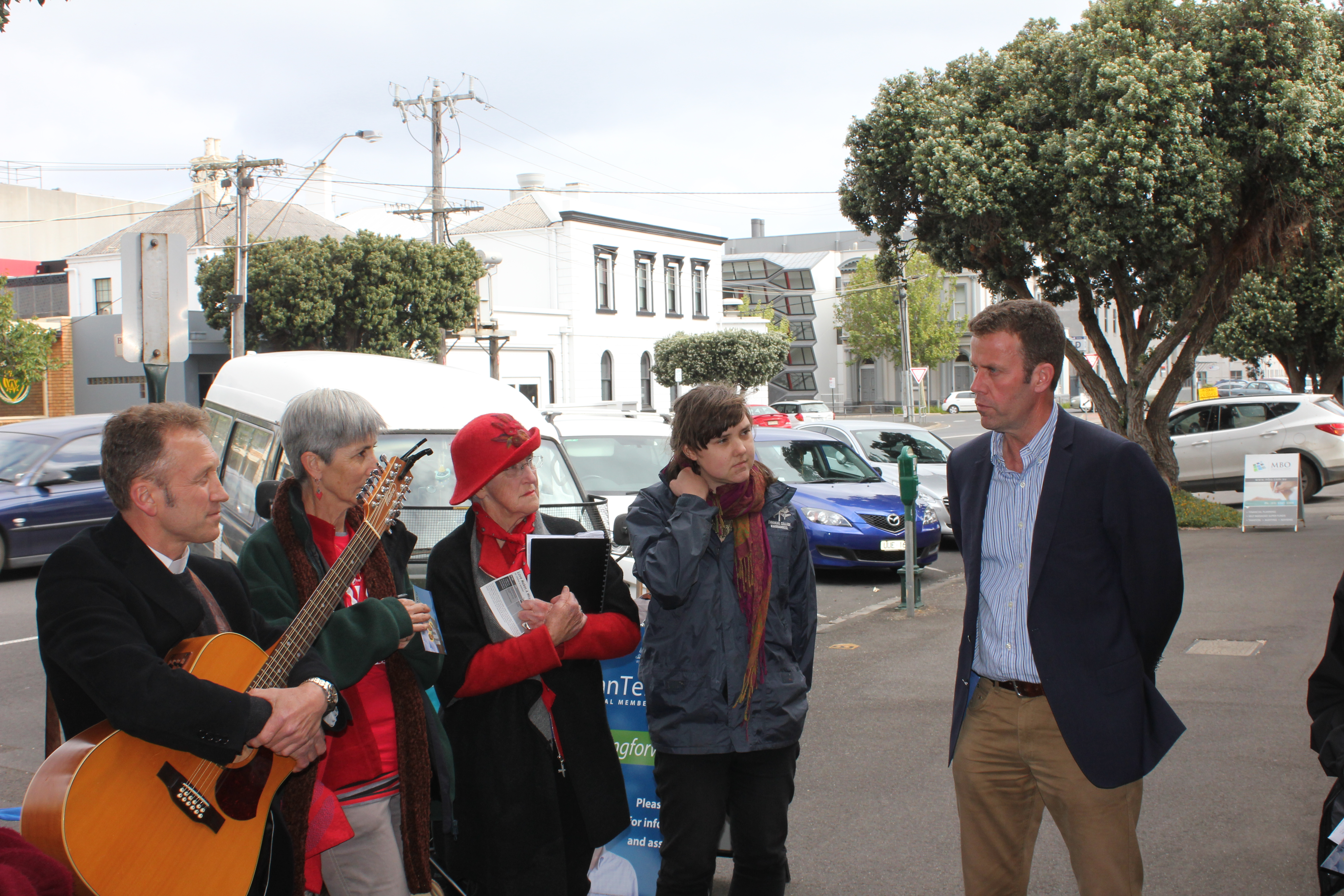
Tehan with constituents in 2015

While still working in Mexico, Tehan sought preselection for the Liberal Party at the 2001 Australian federal election in the Division of Indi. Sophie Panopoulos was ultimately selected as the Liberal candidate.

Tehan was elected to the House of Representatives at the 2010 federal election, succeeding David Hawker in the Division of Wannon. He was encouraged to run for Liberal preselection by Denis Napthine, a family friend, and beat nine other candidates in the ballot despite his lack of prior connections with the area. He and his family moved to Hamilton in order to live in the electorate.

In February 2015, Tehan publicly supported Prime Minister Tony Abbott in the lead-up to a motion to spill the leadership of the Liberal Party. He reportedly also supported Abbott in the September 2015 leadership spill which saw him replaced by Malcolm Turnbull.

=== Turnbull government ===
On 13 February 2016 it was announced that Tehan would be appointed the Minister for Veterans' Affairs, the Minister for Defence Materiel, and the Minister Assisting the Prime Minister for the Centenary of ANZAC following a rearrangement in the First Turnbull Ministry.

With the reelection of the Turnbull government after the 2016 election, Tehan kept his Veterans' Affairs and Centenary of ANZAC portfolios and moved from Defence Materiel to Defence Personnel in the Second Turnbull Ministry. Despite his earlier support of Tony Abbott, in June 2017 he publicly criticised him for his perceived lack of support for the Turnbull government. In the fourth rearrangement of the same Turnbull ministry, on 20 December 2017 Tehan was promoted to the Minister for Social Services and served as a member of the Cabinet.

=== Morrison government ===
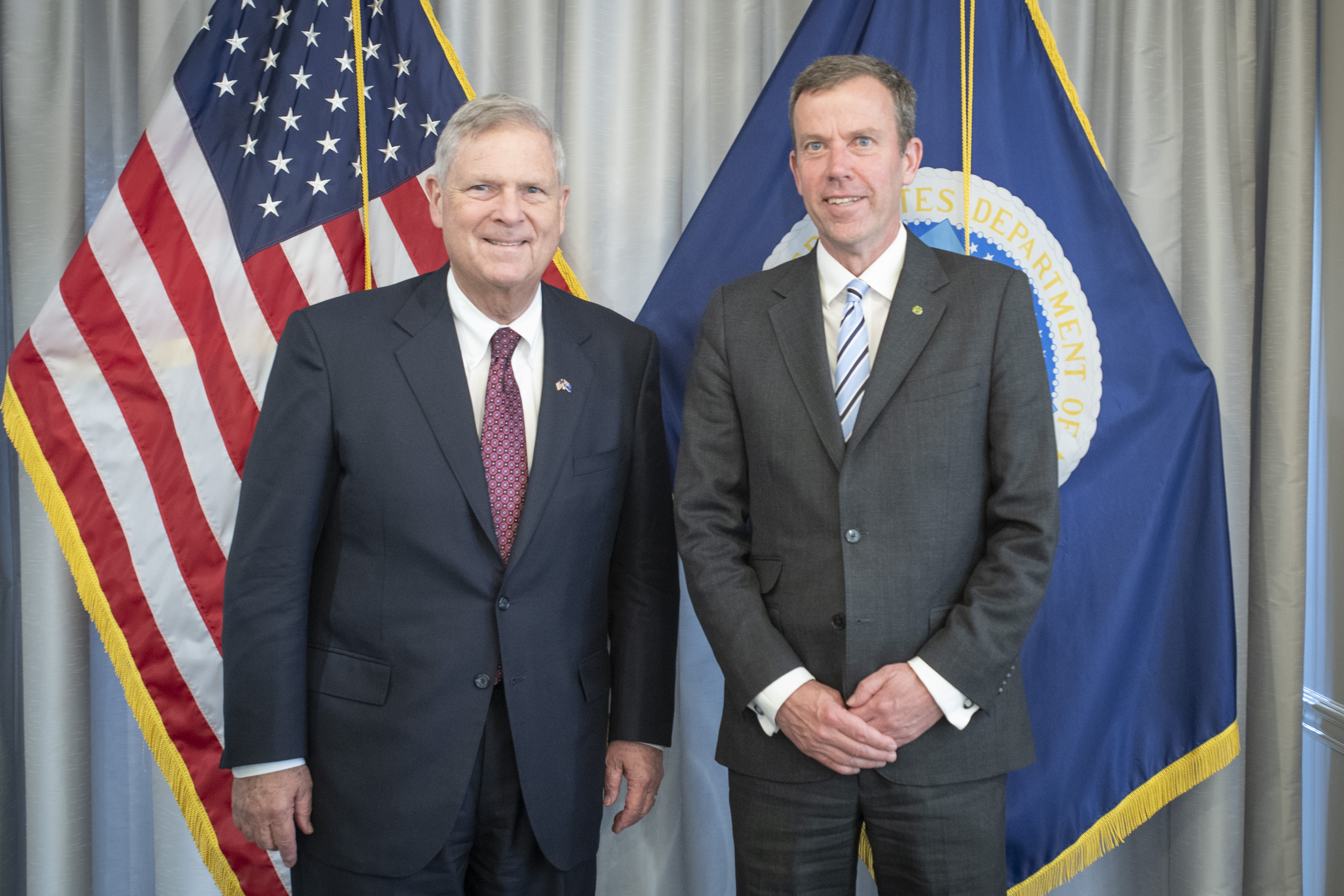
Tehan as trade minister in 2022 with U.S. agriculture secretary Tom Vilsack

During the August 2018 Liberal leadership spills, Tehan announced that he would not vote to depose a sitting prime minister. When Turnbull withdrew from the second vote, he supported Scott Morrison. Tehan was subsequently appointed Minister for Education in the first Morrison Ministry.

Tehan commissioned two reviews into academic freedom following a series of controversies. The first, led by Robert French, recommended the adoption of a freedom-of-speech code, with universities agreeing to implement this by the end of 2020. The second, led by Sally Walker, examined university responses to the French code.

In 2020, Tehan announced a policy whereby university course fees would be altered to encourage "job-ready graduates", with fees to be increased for arts, commerce and law but reduced for STEM subjects. He later proposed that students failing more than half of their courses be denied access to government loans.

Tehan was moved to the trade portfolio in a December 2020 cabinet reshuffle, prompted by the retirement of Mathias Cormann. He took over negotiations for the Australia-United Kingdom Free Trade Agreement from his predecessor Simon Birmingham.

=== Opposition ===
Following the Coalition's defeat at the 2022 federal election, Tehan was given the immigration and citizenship portfolio in Peter Dutton's shadow cabinet.

== Political positions ==
Tehan is a member of the National Right (Old Guard) faction of the Liberal Party, after previously being aligned with centre-right faction during the Morrison government years.

Tehan opposed the legalisation of same-sex marriage in Australia, but in June 2016 announced he would vote in parliament in accordance with the results of a nationwide plebiscite. He ultimately voted in favour of the Marriage Amendment (Definition and Religious Freedoms) Act 2017 which legalised same-sex marriage.

In 2018 he delivered the St Thomas More Lecture in Canberra and spoke of a "creeping encroachment from the state on religious belief", suggesting the introduction of a national religious discrimination act.

== Personal life ==
Tehan has three children and is twice divorced.

Tehan supports the Richmond Tigers in the Australian Football League.

== See also ==
- Political families of Australia

Parliament of Australia
Preceded by David Hawker	Member for Wannon; 2010–present	Incumbent
Political offices
Preceded by Simon Birmingham	Minister for Trade, Tourism and Investment; 2020–2022	Succeeded by Don Farrell
Preceded by Simon Birmingham	Minister for Education; 2018–2020	Succeeded by Alan Tudge as Minister for Education and Youth
Preceded by Christian Porter	Minister for Social Services; 2017-2018	Succeeded by Paul Fletcher
Vacant Title last held by Marise Payne as Acting Minister for Defence Materiel and Science	Minister for Defence Personnel; 2016–2017	Succeeded by Michael McCormack
Preceded by Stuart Robert	Minister for Veterans' Affairs; 2016–2017	Succeeded by Michael McCormack
Preceded by Stuart Robert	Minister Assisting the Prime Minister for the Centenary of ANZAC; 2016–2017	Succeeded by Michael McCormack
Preceded by Marise Payne as Acting Minister for Defence Materiel and Science	Minister for Defence Materiel; 2016	Succeeded by Christopher Pyne as Minister for Defence Industry
