= List of speakers of the Australian House of Representatives =

Below is a list of speakers of the Australian House of Representatives.

The parties shown are those to which the speakers belonged at the time they held office.

== List ==
No.	Name	Portrait	Party	State	Term of office		Comments
1	Sir Frederick Holder		Independent	South Australia	9 May 1901	23 July 1909	Resigned from Free Trade Party upon election as speaker. Died in office.
2	Dr Carty Salmon		Liberal	Victoria	28 July 1909	19 February 1910	
3	Charles McDonald		Labor	Queensland	1 July 1910	23 April 1913	First time in role.
4	Sir Elliot Johnson		Liberal	New South Wales	9 July 1913	30 July 1914	First time in role.
(3)	Charles McDonald		Labor	Queensland	8 October 1914	26 March 1917	Second time in role. First Speaker to serve multiple terms.
(4)	Sir Elliot Johnson		Nationalist	New South Wales	14 June 1917	6 November 1922	Second time in role. Most recent Speaker to serve multiple terms.
5	William Watt		Nationalist	Victoria	28 February 1923	3 October 1925	First former government minister to become Speaker.
6	Sir Littleton Groom		Nationalist	Queensland	13 January 1926	16 September 1929	Defeated in his own seat.
7	Norman Makin		Labor	South Australia	20 November 1929	27 November 1931	
8	George Mackay		United Australia	Queensland	17 February 1932	7 August 1934	
9	Sir George John Bell		United Australia	Tasmania	23 October 1934	27 August 1940	
10	Walter Nairn		United Australia	Western Australia	20 November 1940	21 June 1943	Remained as speaker following the mid-term fall of the Fadden minority government in 1941, until defeated in his own seat at the 1943 election.
11	Sol Rosevear		Labor	New South Wales	22 June 1943	31 October 1949	
12	Archie Cameron		Liberal	South Australia	22 February 1950	9 August 1956	Died in office.
13	Sir John "Jack" McLeay		Liberal	South Australia	29 August 1956	31 October 1966	
14	Sir William Aston		Liberal	New South Wales	21 February 1967	2 November 1972	Defeated in his own seat.
15	Jim Cope		Labor	New South Wales	27 February 1973	27 February 1975	Resigned after the Whitlam government refused to support his naming of the Minister for Labour and Immigration, Clyde Cameron.
16	Gordon Scholes		Labor	Victoria	27 February 1975	11 November 1975	
17	Sir Billy Snedden		Liberal	Victoria	17 February 1976	4 February 1983	
18	Dr Harry Jenkins Sr.		Labor	Victoria	21 April 1983	20 December 1985	First Speaker whose son was a later Speaker.
19	Joan Child	Speaker Joan Child	Labor	Victoria	11 February 1986	28 August 1989	First female Speaker.
20	Leo McLeay		Labor	New South Wales	29 August 1989	8 February 1993	
21	Stephen Martin		Labor	New South Wales	4 May 1993	29 January 1996	
22	Bob Halverson		Liberal	Victoria	30 April 1996	3 March 1998	
23	Ian Sinclair		National	New South Wales	4 March 1998	31 August 1998	
24	Neil Andrew		Liberal	South Australia	10 November 1998	31 August 2004	
25	David Hawker		Liberal	Victoria	16 November 2004	17 October 2007	
26	Harry Jenkins Jr.		Labor	Victoria	12 February 2008	24 November 2011	First Speaker whose father was a Speaker.
27	Peter Slipper		Independent	Queensland	24 November 2011	9 October 2012	Resigned from the Liberal National Party the day after his election as Speaker. Resigned the speakership in the midst of court proceedings. First independent Speaker since Frederick Holder.
28	Anna Burke		Labor	Victoria	9 October 2012	5 August 2013	
29	Bronwyn Bishop		Liberal	New South Wales	12 November 2013	2 August 2015	First non-Labor female Speaker (third overall). Stood down after public outcry about profligate use of taxpayer funded travel benefits.
30	Tony Smith		Liberal	Victoria	10 August 2015	23 November 2021	
31	Andrew Wallace		Liberal	Queensland	23 November 2021	26 July 2022	
32	Milton Dick		Labor	Queensland	26 July 2022	Incumbent	
