= Marida Yallock =

Historic homestead in Victoria, Australia

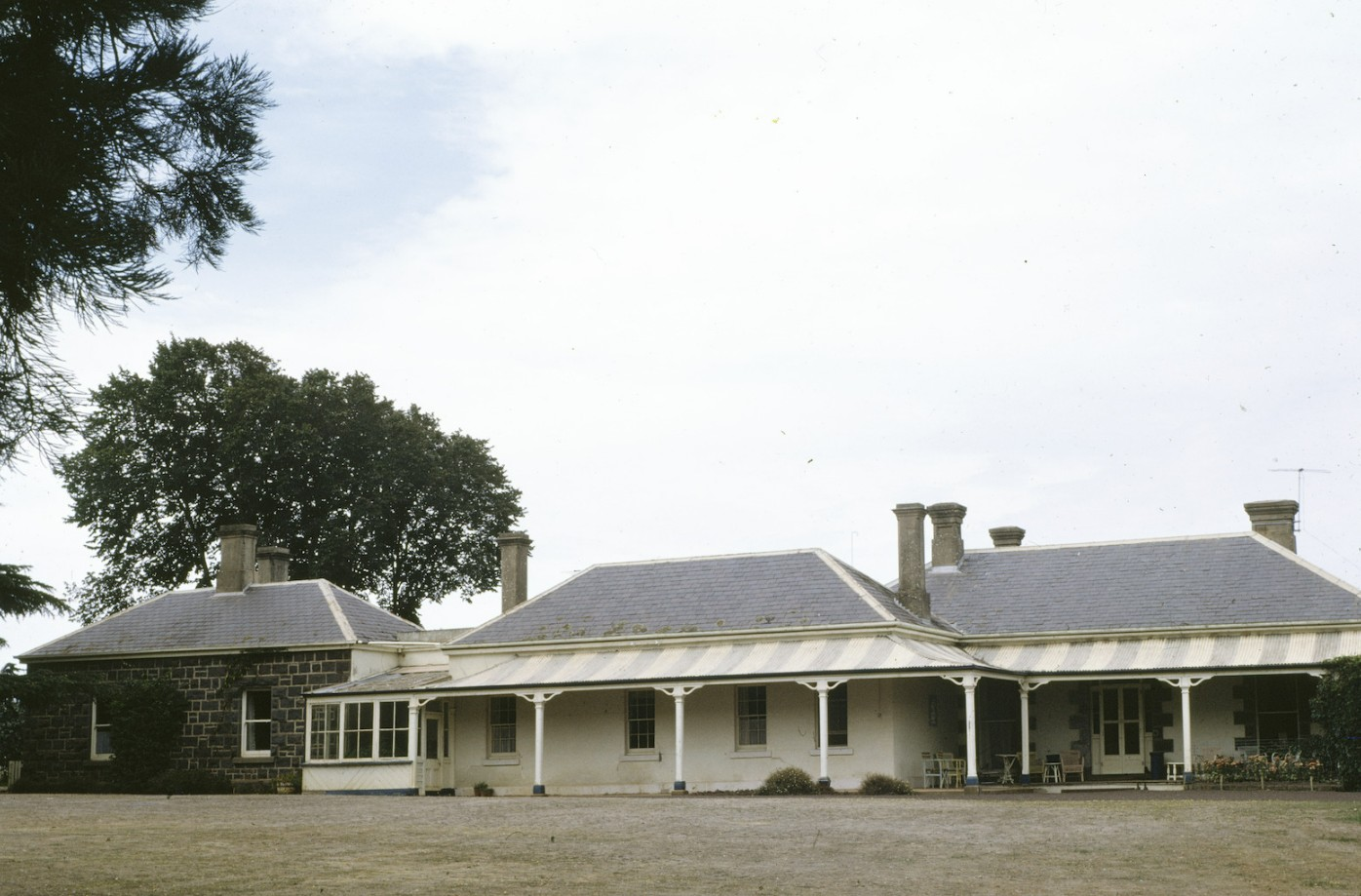
- Marida Yallock homestead

- Location in the Corangamite Shire, Victoria
- 38°13′23″S 142°59′25″E
- Type: Homestead, associated built facilities and grounds
- Location: Boorcan, Victoria, Australia
- Nearest city: Warrnambool

History
- Built: 1854 (later extensions)
- Built for: Daniel MacKinnon

Site notes
- Architectural style: Colonial

Victorian Heritage Register
- Official name: Marida Yallock Homestead
- Type: State heritage (built and natural)
- Designated: 17 June 1965
- Reference no.: 67783

Marida Yallock is a historic pastoral property and homestead on Mount Emu Creek, within the locality of Boorcan, Victoria, Australia. Established as a pastoral run in 1840 during the early European settlement of Victoria's Western District, it became one of the district's most prominent grazing properties under the ownership of pastoralist Daniel MacKinnon. The estate is noted for its association with the development of the Western District pastoral industry and for its historic homestead complex and landscape, dating from 1854. Marida Yallock is listed by the National Trust of Australia (Victoria).

== History ==
The Marida Yallock pastoral run was first taken up in 1840 by Stephen Ewen during the expansion of pastoral settlement across Victoria's Western District. The run occupied heavily timbered country which required extensive clearing before it could be developed for grazing. Over subsequent decades, large areas of woodland were removed and drainage works were undertaken, transforming the property into productive stock country.

In 1852 the run was acquired by Daniel MacKinnon. Daniel was born in Lagg, on the Isle of Arran, Scotland in 1818, and arrived in the Colony of New South Wales 15 years earlier, in 1839. Daniel oversaw the construction of the earliest section of the homestead complex in 1854. During the second half of the nineteenth century the estate was progressively enlarged through the purchase of freehold land surrounding the original pastoral lease. By the late nineteenth century, Marida Yallock had become one of the best-known fattening properties in the district, carrying substantial numbers of cattle and sheep.

The property was extensively improved during Daniel MacKinnon's ownership, including the establishment of ornamental gardens and tree plantings. The house was also significantly expanded during the 1860s and 1870s.

Following Daniel MacKinnon's death in 1889, Marida Yallock remained in the ownership of the MacKinnon family. His son Donald MacKinnon, later a member of the Victorian Legislative Assembly and Attorney-General of Victoria, inherited the estate, although much of its managements was undertaken by his brother William Kinross MacKinnon. The property continued to operate as a pastoral enterprise through the early twentieth century. Around this time, landscape designer William Guilfoyle was attributed with the design of a garden at the property.

After the Second World War, a substantial portion of the estate was acquired by the Vicotrian Soldier Settlement Commission and subdivided for returned servicemen. The subdivision contributed significantly to the growth of the Boorcan district and altered the pattern of land ownership in the surrounding area. A monument commemorating the soldier settlement scheme was later erected near the former estate.
