= National Wool Museum (Geelong) =

Coordinates: 38.145374°S 144.361221°E

- Established: 1988
- Location: 26 Moorabool Street, Geelong, Australia
- Type: Historical museum
- Website: www.nwm.vic.gov.au

The National Wool Museum is a museum based in Geelong, Victoria, Australia which tells the story of wool, fibre and textiles, alongside a range of contemporary exhibitions, public programs and special events. The museum opened in 1988 as part of the Australian Bicentennial Celebrations.

== Background ==
The museum is housed in the former Dennys, Lascelles Ltd Woolstore at 26 Moorabool Street, Geelong. The museum began its life as the National Wool Centre and was opened by Queen Elizabeth II on 14 April 1988 as part of the Australian Bicentenary celebrations.

Geelong has been farming sheep for wool since 1868, and has previously been known as the "wool centre of the world".

The Geelong Regional Commission was created in 1977, as part of Victorian government regional planning and gave consideration to a centre of excellence to promote the wool industry. Proposals for the National Wool Centre were put forward as early as 1979. The National Wool Museum was established by the Geelong Regional Commission in 1988 as Australia's only comprehensive museum dedicated to the wool industry at the local, state, national and international level. Initially, the museum consisted of three galleries with the wool buyers' offices and the Geelong Wool Exchange, a building dating from 1872, as part of the complex.

Barunah Plains Tours: During that era, Barunah Plains (located near Hesse, West of Geelong) was famously known as a renowned pastoral estate holding top-tier Merino sheep, often featuring in pastoral tours showcasing Geelong's surrounding historic Western District properties

The museum houses over 9,000 artefacts dating as far back as 1797. It is also home to a gift shop selling locally produced wool items.
