= David Hawker =

Australian politician (born 1949)

The Honourable David Hawker AO

25th Speaker of the Australian House of Representatives
- In office 16 November 2004 – 17 October 2007
- Preceded by: Neil Andrew
- Succeeded by: Harry Jenkins

Member of the Australian Parliament for Wannon
- In office 7 May 1983 – 19 July 2010
- Preceded by: Malcolm Fraser
- Succeeded by: Dan Tehan

Personal details
- Born: 1 May 1949 (age 77) Adelaide, South Australia, Australia
- Party: Liberal Party of Australia
- Relations: Charles Hawker (cousin); George Charles Hawker (great-grandfather)
- Education: University of Melbourne
- Occupation: Farmer and grazier
- Website: davidhawker.com.au

David Peter Maxwell Hawker AO (born 1 May 1949) is a former Australian politician who served as a Liberal member of the Australian House of Representatives from May 1983 to July 2010, representing the Division of Wannon, Victoria, previously represented by former Prime Minister Malcolm Fraser.

Hawker served as the 25th Speaker of the House of Representatives from 2004 to 2007.

== Early life ==
Hawker was born in Adelaide on 1 May 1949, the son of Pamela Gavin and David Hawker. His father, a grazier, was a grandson of colonial MP George Charles Hawker and cousin of federal MP Charles Hawker.

Hawker's family moved to Apsley, Victoria, when he was four years old, where they ran a sheep station. He attended Geelong Grammar School and went on to study mechanical engineering at the University of Melbourne. He entered residence at Trinity College in 1968, graduating Bachelor of Engineering in 1972. He subsequently worked as a graduate engineer at the Altona Refinery and also as a jackaroo outside of Port Augusta, South Australia, before returning to manage the family property at Apsley.

== Career ==
After Fraser announced his retirement from politics amid the Coalition's heavy defeat in the 1983 federal election, Hawker won the seat in a May 1983 by-election. Hawker was a member of the Opposition Shadow Ministry 1990–93, a Deputy Opposition Whip 1989–90 and 1994, and Chief Opposition Whip 1994–96.

On 15 November 2004 Hawker was chosen by the Parliamentary Liberal Party as its candidate for the position of Speaker of the House of Representatives. He was formally elected to the position on 16 November without opposition. After the 2007 federal election, Labor member Harry Jenkins succeeded Hawker as Speaker of the House, and took office on 12 February 2008.

Hawker announced in June 2009 that he would retire from parliament at the 2010 federal election.

== Speaker ==
Hawker had been considered as a candidate for Speaker in both of the 1998 Speakership elections, which saw Ian Sinclair then Neil Andrew elected successively. Following Andrew's retirement at the 2004 federal election, he was nominated by the Howard government for the position. As Speaker from 2004 to 2007, Hawker was the subject of some controversy.

=== Early dissent ===
Some of Hawker's rulings, from motions put by the Australian Labor Party Opposition, were somewhat controversial early in his term, with one session of Question Time on 1 December 2004 resulting in twelve points of order, some continuously raised, to Brendan Nelson's response to a question on school funding raised by Sophie Mirabella, in that it was seen by the Opposition to anticipate debate. This session resulted in a dissent motion regarding the permission of ministers tabling documents at the end of answers, which was negatived. A further dissent motion was raised on 7 December 2004, regarding questions asked relating to public affairs but not directly regarding the subject's portfolio, specifically, the desire of the Opposition to question De-Anne Kelly to her supposed approval of funding of a project not relating to her portfolio of Veterans' Affairs. This dissent motion was also voted down. Likewise, a motion of dissent on 28 November 2005 to a ruling that the Member for Perth resume his seat, having twice ignored an instruction to desist in argument across the chamber, was voted down. (Immediately thereafter, the motion to place further motions on notice was passed without a vote, and the Speaker responded to the Leader of the Opposition's subsequent Point of Order by stating that the motion was a "request".)

=== Questions over impartiality ===
A 2006 ruling made by Hawker after an incident during a heated exchange in the House brought further motions of dissent from the Opposition, and drew criticism of the Speaker's impartiality from the media.

After a motion regarding share trading was moved by Kelvin Thomson, the Member for Wills, on 25 May 2006, Leader of the House Tony Abbott referred to Thomson indirectly using unparliamentary language by moving the motion "that that snivelling grub be no longer heard". The Deputy Chair at the time, Peter Lindsay, did not make comment against to the withdrawal Abbott made using the words "if I have offended grubs, I withdraw unconditionally". Later, the Speaker assumed the Chair, but it was only after the Opposition attempted to move a dissent motion that Abbott withdrew "unconditionally any imputation or offensive words against the member for Wills".

The following week, on 31 May, Manager of Opposition Business Julia Gillard attempted to mimic exactly the exchange of 25 May by moving the motion "that that snivelling grub over there be not further heard" against Abbott on a health legislation amendment, and then stating that "If I have offended grubs, I withdraw unconditionally", the Speaker asked Gillard to withdraw "without reservation". Gillard responded that "in accordance with your ruling yesterday, I have withdrawn effectively", but the Speaker then said that "I have no option...but to name the member", and subsequently by motion from Abbott, Gillard was removed from the House for 24 hours.

The Opposition had earlier asked questions to the Speaker about the apparent impartiality of the latter ruling, but criticism of the decision reached the media, with the Speaker defending the decision made referring to Abbott's later unconditional withdrawal. Under standing order 94A, the Speaker can throw members out of the parliament without a verbal warning for one hour. This rule has frequently been used to expel disruptive opposition members from the parliament. During the 2 November 2005 Question Time which centred over the government's controversial Industrial Relations reforms some eleven Labor members were thrown out in one day. This was a record number of ejections in question time until Bronwyn Bishop ejected 18 members during question time on 27 November 2014.

== Honours ==
On 11 June 2012, he was named an Officer of the Order of Australia for "distinguished service to the Parliament of Australia, to public administration and monetary policy reform, and to the community through local government, health and sporting organisations."

Parliament of Australia
Preceded by Neil Andrew	Speaker of the Australian House of Representatives; 2004–2008	Succeeded by Harry Jenkins
Preceded by Malcolm Fraser	Member for Wannon; 1983–2010	Succeeded by Dan Tehan
