= Thomas Scholfield =

Australian politician

Thomas Scholfield MC
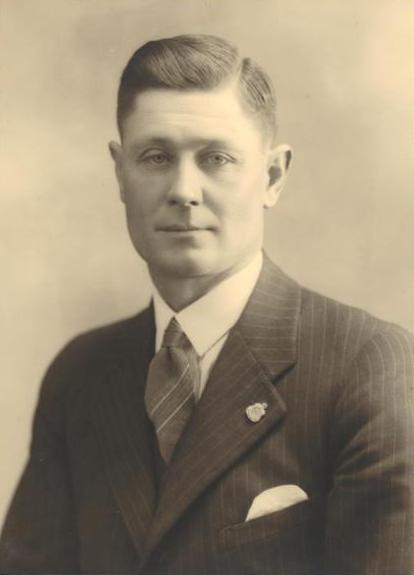

Member of the Australian Parliament for Wannon
- In office 19 December 1931 – 21 September 1940
- Preceded by: John McNeill
- Succeeded by: Don McLeod

Personal details
- Born: 9 May 1894 Telangatuk East, Victoria
- Died: 25 June 1964 (aged 70)
- Party: United Australia Party
- Occupation: Farmer

Thomas Hallett Scholfield, MC (9 May 1894 – 25 June 1964) was an Australian politician. He was a United Australia Party member of the Australian House of Representatives from 1931 to 1940, representing the electorate of Wannon.

Scholfield was born in Talangatuk East, Victoria, where he attended state schools and became a farmer. He enlisted to serve in World War I in January 1915, fought with the 21st Battalion at Gallipoli and in France, and received the Military Medal and Military Cross, returning to Australia in June 1919. He subsequently became a soldier settler in the Balmoral area before acquiring a farm near Hamilton, and was a councillor and president of the Shire of Kowree.

He was elected to the House of Representatives at the 1931 federal election, defeating Labor MP John McNeill. He had campaigned on a platform of addressing the needs of primary producers. He held the seat until his defeat by Labor candidate Don McLeod at the 1940 election. He unsuccessfully recontested the seat as an independent in 1943.

During World War II, Scholfield served as deputy-assistant quartermaster general in the Volunteer Defence Corps.

Following World War II, Scholfield moved to New South Wales and assumed a prominent role as organising secretary of the New England New State Movement.

Scholfield died in 1964.

Parliament of Australia
Preceded by John McNeill	Member for Wannon; 1931–1940	Succeeded by Don McLeod
