= Dennys Lascelles Ltd =

Australian agriculture company

Dennys, Lascelles Ltd was a major agricultural firm based in Geelong, Australia.

It was established in 1857 as C. J. Dennys & Co. It changed its name to Dennys Lascelles & Co. in 1875, and became Dennys, Lascelles, Austin & Co. in 1881. It was reconstituted as a public company, Dennys Lascelles Ltd, in 1912. It was acquired by the Australian Mercantile Land and Finance Company in 1978. It later formed part of the Elders Limited group.

The company's 1872 bluestone woolstore in central Geelong is listed on the Victorian Heritage Register, and now houses the National Wool Museum. An 1881 annexe was demolished in 1983, while the 1990 demolition of the landmark 1910 "Bow Truss Building" addition to the woolstore caused a major controversy over heritage preservation. A second 1934 woolstore, situated on the Geelong waterfront, was refurbished in 2009 as an addition to the Deakin University waterfront campus.
