= Electoral results for the Division of Wakefield =

Australian division election results

This is a list of electoral results for the Division of Wakefield in Australian federal elections from the division's creation in 1903 until its abolition in 2019.

== Members ==
Member	Party	Term
Sir Frederick Holder	Independent	1903–1909
Richard Foster	Liberal	1909–1917
Richard Foster	Nationalist	1917–1922
Richard Foster	Liberal Union	1922–1925
Richard Foster	Nationalist	1925–1928
Maurice Collins	Country	1928–1929
Charles Hawker	Nationalist	1929–1931
Charles Hawker	United Australia	1931–1938
Sydney McHugh	Labor	1938–1940
Jack Duncan-Hughes	United Australia	1940–1943
Albert Smith	Labor	1943–1946
(Sir) Philip McBride	Liberal	1946–1958
Bert Kelly	Liberal	1958–1977
Geoffrey Giles	Liberal	1977–1983
Neil Andrew	Liberal	1983–2004
David Fawcett	Liberal	2004–2007
Nick Champion	Labor	2007–2019

== Election results ==
=== Elections in the 2010s ===
==== 2016 ====
2016 Australian federal election: Wakefield
Party	Candidate	Votes	%	±%
Labor	Nick Champion	38,197	39.82	−1.70
Liberal	Kathleen Bourne	25,299	26.37	−11.52
Xenophon	Richard Inwood	19,592	20.42	+20.42
Family First	Marilyn Phillips	5,396	5.62	−0.36
Greens	Craig Vanstone	4,102	4.28	−0.87
Independent	John Bolton	2,728	2.84	+2.84
Christian Democrats	Ralph Anderson	619	0.65	+0.65
Total formal votes		95,933	94.61	+0.30
Informal votes		5,470	5.39	−0.30
Turnout		101,403	90.34	−2.77
Two-party-preferred result
Labor	Nick Champion	58,494	60.97	+7.57
Liberal	Kathleen Bourne	37,439	39.03	−7.57
Labor hold		Swing	+7.57	

==== 2013 ====
2013 Australian federal election: Wakefield
Party	Candidate	Votes	%	±%
Labor	Nick Champion	37,723	41.52	−6.35
Liberal	Tom Zorich	34,425	37.89	+5.12
Family First	Paul Coombe	5,436	5.98	−0.70
Greens	Sherree Clay	4,683	5.15	−6.18
Palmer United	Dino Musolino	3,890	4.28	+4.28
Independent	Mark Aldridge	3,729	4.10	+4.10
Katter's Australian	Tony Musolino	964	1.06	+1.06
Total formal votes		90,850	94.31	+0.38
Informal votes		5,479	5.69	−0.38
Turnout		96,329	93.11	−0.33
Two-party-preferred result
Labor	Nick Champion	48,510	53.40	−7.13
Liberal	Tom Zorich	42,340	46.60	+7.13
Labor hold		Swing	−7.13	

==== 2010 ====
2010 Australian federal election: Wakefield
Party	Candidate	Votes	%	±%
Labor	Nick Champion	43,299	49.20	+0.55
Liberal	David Strauss	27,679	31.45	−7.24
Greens	Jane Alcorn	9,948	11.30	+7.17
Family First	Paul Coombe	5,958	6.77	+1.61
Democrats	Darren Hassan	1,129	1.28	+0.11
Total formal votes		88,013	93.78	−1.56
Informal votes		5,837	6.22	+1.56
Turnout		93,850	93.65	−1.48
Two-party-preferred result
Labor	Nick Champion	54,528	61.95	+5.36
Liberal	David Strauss	33,485	38.05	−5.36
Labor hold		Swing	+5.36	

=== Elections in the 2000s ===
==== 2007 ====
2007 Australian federal election: Wakefield
Party	Candidate	Votes	%	±%
Labor	Nick Champion	42,249	48.65	+6.28
Liberal	David Fawcett	33,600	38.69	−5.12
Family First	Bruce Nairn	4,483	5.16	−0.27
Greens	Terry Allen	3,589	4.13	−0.02
Democrats	Felicity Martin	1,016	1.17	−0.50
One Nation	Peter Fitzpatrick	832	0.96	−1.60
What Women Want	Pauline Edmunds	793	0.91	+0.91
Liberty & Democracy	Martin Walsh	284	0.33	+0.33
Total formal votes		86,846	95.34	+1.82
Informal votes		4,246	4.66	−1.82
Turnout		91,092	95.16	+0.18
Two-party-preferred result
Labor	Nick Champion	49,142	56.59	+7.26
Liberal	David Fawcett	37,704	43.41	−7.26
Labor gain from Liberal		Swing	+7.26	

==== 2004 ====
2004 Australian federal election: Wakefield
Party	Candidate	Votes	%	±%
Liberal	David Fawcett	35,320	43.81	+4.73
Labor	Martyn Evans	34,159	42.37	+3.40
Family First	David Pointon	4,379	5.43	+5.43
Greens	Patricia Murray	3,346	4.15	+1.00
One Nation	David Dwyer	2,066	2.56	−4.34
Democrats	Richard Way	1,346	1.67	−7.87
Total formal votes		80,616	93.52	−0.05
Informal votes		5,585	6.48	+0.05
Turnout		86,585	94.98	+0.08
Two-party-preferred result
Liberal	David Fawcett	40,848	50.67	+1.93
Labor	Martyn Evans	39,768	49.33	−1.93
Liberal notional gain from Labor		Swing	+1.93	

==== 2001 ====
2001 Australian federal election: Wakefield
Party	Candidate	Votes	%	±%
Liberal	Neil Andrew	44,216	56.24	+6.27
Labor	Tim Rowbottom	19,480	24.78	+2.81
One Nation	David Dwyer	6,172	7.85	−8.59
Democrats	Marcus Reseigh	5,942	7.56	−0.14
Greens	Pam Kelly	2,816	3.58	+3.58
Total formal votes		78,626	94.52	−0.57
Informal votes		4,558	5.48	+0.57
Turnout		83,184	96.69	
Two-party-preferred result
Liberal	Neil Andrew	50,764	64.57	−2.07
Labor	Tim Rowbottom	27,861	35.43	+2.07
Liberal hold		Swing	−2.07	

=== Elections in the 1990s ===
==== 1998 ====
1998 Australian federal election: Wakefield
Party	Candidate	Votes	%	±%
Liberal	Neil Andrew	40,464	50.07	−10.80
Labor	Carla Leversedge	17,526	21.69	−1.11
One Nation	Merv Hartwig	13,473	16.67	+16.67
Democrats	Karrie Lannstrom	6,200	7.67	−3.22
Independent	Pam Kelly	1,690	2.09	+2.09
National	Jeremy Challacombe	1,458	1.80	+1.80
Total formal votes		80,811	95.08	−1.12
Informal votes		4,180	4.92	+1.12
Turnout		84,991	95.87	−0.75
Two-party-preferred result
Liberal	Neil Andrew	53,573	66.29	−3.67
Labor	Carla Leversedge	27,238	33.71	+3.67
Liberal hold		Swing	−3.67	

==== 1996 ====
1996 Australian federal election: Wakefield
Party	Candidate	Votes	%	±%
Liberal	Neil Andrew	48,937	60.87	+3.79
Labor	Mike Stevens	18,325	22.79	−3.32
Democrats	Pam Kelly	8,759	10.90	+2.00
Grey Power	Eugene Rooney	2,273	2.83	+2.83
Greens	Paul Petit	2,098	2.61	+2.61
Total formal votes		80,392	96.20	+0.15
Informal votes		3,174	3.80	−0.15
Turnout		83,566	96.62	+0.96
Two-party-preferred result
Liberal	Neil Andrew	55,965	69.96	+2.98
Labor	Mike Stevens	24,027	30.04	−2.98
Liberal hold		Swing	+2.98	

==== 1993 ====
1993 Australian federal election: Wakefield
Party	Candidate	Votes	%	±%
Liberal	Neil Andrew	44,503	57.08	+2.69
Labor	Mike Stevens	20,360	26.12	−2.82
Democrats	Roy Milne	6,938	8.90	−4.28
Independent	Don Allen	3,189	4.09	+4.09
Independent	Shirley Faulkner	2,066	2.65	+2.65
Natural Law	Ingrid Hergstrom	904	1.16	+1.16
Total formal votes		77,960	96.05	−0.72
Informal votes		3,202	3.95	+0.72
Turnout		81,162	95.66	
Two-party-preferred result
Liberal	Neil Andrew	52,112	66.98	+4.91
Labor	Mike Stevens	25,689	33.02	−4.91
Liberal hold		Swing	+4.91	

==== 1990 ====
1990 Australian federal election: Wakefield
Party	Candidate	Votes	%	±%
Liberal	Neil Andrew	40,216	55.7	−0.1
Labor	George Karzis	20,965	29.0	−4.0
Democrats	Kaye Matthews	8,879	12.3	+8.2
Call to Australia	Ashley Grace	2,144	3.0	+3.0
Total formal votes		72,204	96.9	
Informal votes		2,287	3.1	
Turnout		74,491	96.4	
Two-party-preferred result
Liberal	Neil Andrew	45,378	62.9	−0.8
Labor	George Karzis	26,736	37.1	+0.8
Liberal hold		Swing	−0.8	

=== Elections in the 1980s ===
==== 1987 ====
1987 Australian federal election: Wakefield
Party	Candidate	Votes	%	±%
Liberal	Neil Andrew	36,503	55.8	−1.5
Labor	Susan Stephens	21,592	33.0	−0.8
National	Bill Adams	3,826	5.9	+3.0
Democrats	Barbara Barlow	2,683	4.1	−1.9
Unite Australia	Anne Hausler	757	1.2	+1.2
Total formal votes		65,361	93.6	
Informal votes		4,439	6.4	
Turnout		69,800	94.5	
Two-party-preferred result
Liberal	Neil Andrew	41,626	63.7	+0.8
Labor	Susan Stephens	23,733	36.3	−0.8
Liberal hold		Swing	+0.8	

==== 1984 ====
1984 Australian federal election: Wakefield
Party	Candidate	Votes	%	±%
Liberal	Neil Andrew	35,574	57.3	−1.6
Labor	Suzanne Owens	20,964	33.8	+0.3
Democrats	Anne Hausler	3,714	6.0	+0.7
National	Terry Halford	1,800	2.9	+0.6
Total formal votes		62,052	92.1	
Informal votes		5,294	7.9	
Turnout		67,346	95.4	
Two-party-preferred result
Liberal	Neil Andrew	39,047	62.9	−0.2
Labor	Suzanne Owens	22,997	37.1	+0.2
Liberal hold		Swing	−0.2	

==== 1983 ====
1983 Australian federal election: Wakefield
Party	Candidate	Votes	%	±%
Liberal	Neil Andrew	43,380	59.5	−0.3
Labor	Suzanne Owens	24,002	32.9	+3.9
Democrats	Donald Chisholm	3,851	5.3	−3.2
National	Roger Cavanagh	1,658	2.3	−0.4
Total formal votes		72,891	97.6	
Informal votes		1,816	2.4	
Turnout		74,707	95.5	
Two-party-preferred result
Liberal	Neil Andrew		63.7	−2.5
Labor	Suzanne Owens		36.3	+2.5
Liberal hold		Swing	−2.5	

==== 1980 ====
1980 Australian federal election: Wakefield
Party	Candidate	Votes	%	±%
Liberal	Geoffrey Giles	41,934	59.8	−2.1
Labor	Alan Reid	20,308	29.0	−0.9
Democrats	Rowland Beech	5,971	8.5	+0.3
National Country	Duncan Rose	1,901	2.7	+2.7
Total formal votes		70,144	97.3	
Informal votes		1,944	2.7	
Turnout		72,058	95.6	
Two-party-preferred result
Liberal	Geoffrey Giles		66.2	+0.2
Labor	Alan Reid		33.8	−0.2
Liberal hold		Swing	+0.2	

=== Elections in the 1970s ===
==== 1977 ====
1977 Australian federal election: Wakefield
Party	Candidate	Votes	%	±%
Liberal	Geoffrey Giles	42,077	61.9	−4.7
Labor	Denis Crisp	20,303	29.9	+4.2
Democrats	Kenneth Maguire	5,564	8.2	+8.2
Total formal votes		67,944	97.1	
Informal votes		2,047	2.9	
Turnout		69,991	96.2	
Two-party-preferred result
Liberal	Geoffrey Giles		66.0	−6.4
Labor	Denis Crisp		34.0	+6.4
Liberal hold		Swing	−6.4	

==== 1975 ====
1975 Australian federal election: Wakefield
Party	Candidate	Votes	%	±%
Liberal	Bert Kelly	32,070	66.2	+16.8
Labor	Irene Krastev	12,632	26.1	−2.8
Liberal Movement	John Lienert	3,719	7.7	+0.5
Total formal votes		48,421	98.1	
Informal votes		917	1.9	
Turnout		49,338	96.2	
Two-party-preferred result
Liberal	Bert Kelly		72.0	+4.5
Labor	Irene Krastev		38.0	−4.5
Liberal hold		Swing	+4.5	

==== 1974 ====
1974 Australian federal election: Wakefield
Party	Candidate	Votes	%	±%
Liberal	Bert Kelly	22,761	49.4	−0.3
Labor	Peter Dewhurst	13,304	28.9	−3.1
Country	Ronald Crosby	6,225	13.5	−1.6
Liberal Movement	John Freebairn	3,316	7.2	+7.2
Australia	Ian Swan	476	1.0	+1.0
Total formal votes		46,082	97.5	
Informal votes		1,174	2.5	
Turnout		47,256	96.4	
Two-party-preferred result
Liberal	Bert Kelly		67.5	+1.6
Labor	Peter Dewhurst		32.5	−1.6
Liberal hold		Swing	+1.6	

==== 1972 ====
1972 Australian federal election: Wakefield
Party	Candidate	Votes	%	±%
Liberal	Bert Kelly	21,211	49.7	−8.4
Labor	Terence de Lacy	13,643	32.0	−4.9
Country	James Shannon	6,448	15.1	+15.1
Democratic Labor	John McMahon	1,365	3.2	−1.7
Total formal votes		42,667	97.8	
Informal votes		968	2.2	
Turnout		43,635	95.1	
Two-party-preferred result
Liberal	Bert Kelly		65.9	+3.9
Labor	Terence de Lacy		34.1	−3.9
Liberal hold		Swing	+3.9	

=== Elections in the 1960s ===
==== 1969 ====
1969 Australian federal election: Wakefield
Party	Candidate	Votes	%	±%
Liberal	Bert Kelly	24,685	58.1	−13.1
Labor	Brian Chatterton	15,693	36.9	+8.1
Democratic Labor	John McMahon	2,095	4.9	+4.9
Total formal votes		42,473	97.4	
Informal votes		1,139	2.6	
Turnout		43,612	96.6	
Two-party-preferred result
Liberal	Bert Kelly		62.0	−9.2
Labor	Brian Chatterton		38.0	+9.2
Liberal hold		Swing	−9.2	

==== 1966 ====
1966 Australian federal election: Wakefield
Party	Candidate	Votes	%	±%
Liberal	Bert Kelly	31,280	69.5	+8.4
Labor	John Phelan	13,737	30.5	−8.4
Total formal votes		45,017	97.9	
Informal votes		970	2.1	
Turnout		45,987	97.1	
Liberal hold		Swing	+8.4	

==== 1963 ====
1963 Australian federal election: Wakefield
Party	Candidate	Votes	%	±%
Liberal	Bert Kelly	25,177	61.1	+3.0
Labor	John Penrose	16,049	38.9	+2.2
Total formal votes		41,226	98.4	
Informal votes		654	1.6	
Turnout		41,880	97.5	
Liberal hold		Swing	−1.2	

==== 1961 ====
1961 Australian federal election: Wakefield
Party	Candidate	Votes	%	±%
Liberal	Bert Kelly	22,759	58.1	+1.3
Labor	Collin Wood	14,364	36.7	+5.8
Democratic Labor	John McMahon	2,048	5.2	−0.5
Total formal votes		39,171	97.8	
Informal votes		884	2.2	
Turnout		40,055	96.9	
Two-party-preferred result
Liberal	Bert Kelly		62.3	−2.8
Labor	Collin Wood		37.7	+2.8
Liberal hold		Swing	−2.8	

=== Elections in the 1950s ===
==== 1958 ====
1958 Australian federal election: Wakefield
Party	Candidate	Votes	%	±%
Liberal	Bert Kelly	21,844	56.8	−5.4
Labor	Leonard Krieg	11,899	30.9	−1.5
Independent	Hector Henstridge	2,518	6.5	+1.1
Democratic Labor	Leo Redden	2,198	5.7	+5.7
Total formal votes		38,459	96.4	
Informal votes		1,427	3.6	
Turnout		39,886	97.2	
Two-party-preferred result
Liberal	Bert Kelly		65.1	+0.2
Labor	Leonard Krieg		34.9	−0.2
Liberal hold		Swing	+0.2	

==== 1955 ====
1955 Australian federal election: Wakefield
Party	Candidate	Votes	%	±%
Liberal	Sir Philip McBride	24,283	62.2	+3.8
Labor	Robert Bruce	12,671	32.4	−4.1
Independent	Hector Henstridge	2,095	5.4	−0.4
Total formal votes		39,049	96.9	
Informal votes		1,232	3.1	
Turnout		40,281	96.7	
Two-party-preferred result
Liberal	Sir Philip McBride		64.9	+2.7
Labor	Robert Bruce		35.1	−2.7
Liberal hold		Swing	+2.7	

==== 1954 ====
1954 Australian federal election: Wakefield
Party	Candidate	Votes	%	±%
Liberal	Sir Philip McBride	21,893	56.8	+3.3
Labor	Edward Harradine	14,400	37.4	−2.5
Independent	Hector Henstridge	2,218	5.8	+5.8
Total formal votes		38,511	98.5	
Informal votes		598	1.5	
Turnout		39,109	97.5	
Two-party-preferred result
Liberal	Sir Philip McBride		59.7	−0.4
Labor	Edward Harradine		40.3	+0.4
Liberal hold		Swing	−0.4	

==== 1951 ====
1951 Australian federal election: Wakefield
Party	Candidate	Votes	%	±%
Liberal	Philip McBride	23,232	60.1	−1.3
Labor	Cyril Hasse	15,437	39.9	+1.3
Total formal votes		38,669	98.4	
Informal votes		642	1.6	
Turnout		39,311	97.7	
Liberal hold		Swing	−1.3	

=== Elections in the 1940s ===
==== 1949 ====
1949 Australian federal election: Wakefield
Party	Candidate	Votes	%	±%
Liberal	Philip McBride	23,847	61.4	+8.3
Labor	Cyril Hasse	15,008	38.6	−7.2
Total formal votes		38,855	98.3	
Informal votes		681	1.7	
Turnout		39,536	97.4	
Liberal hold		Swing	+7.8	

==== 1946 ====
1946 Australian federal election: Wakefield
Party	Candidate	Votes	%	±%
Liberal	Philip McBride	26,894	51.5	+2.7
Labor	Albert Smith	24,046	46.1	−5.1
Independent	Frank Rieck	1,260	2.4	+2.4
Total formal votes		52,200	97.2	
Informal votes		1,486	2.8	
Turnout		53,686	94.7	
Two-party-preferred result
Liberal	Philip McBride		52.7	+3.9
Labor	Albert Smith		47.3	−3.9
Liberal gain from Labor		Swing	+3.9	

==== 1943 ====
1943 Australian federal election: Wakefield
Party	Candidate	Votes	%	±%
Labor	Albert Smith	26,444	51.2	+4.6
United Australia	Jack Duncan-Hughes	25,229	48.8	−4.6
Total formal votes		51,673	97.5	
Informal votes		1,327	2.5	
Turnout		53,000	96.5	
Labor gain from United Australia		Swing	+4.6	

==== 1940 ====
1940 Australian federal election: Wakefield
Party	Candidate	Votes	%	±%
United Australia	Jack Duncan-Hughes	27,357	53.4	−10.0
Labor	Sydney McHugh	23,870	46.6	+10.0
Total formal votes		51,227	97.1	
Informal votes		1,547	2.9	
Turnout		52,774	96.3	
United Australia gain from Labor		Swing	−10.0	

=== Elections in the 1930s ===
1938 Wakefield by-election
Party	Candidate	Votes	%	±%
United Australia	Richard Butler	19,591	39.3	−24.1
Labor	Sydney McHugh	18,870	37.9	+1.3
Independent	Percival Quirke	11,343	22.8	+22.8
Total formal votes		49,804	97.8	
Informal votes		1,114	2.2	
Turnout		50.918	93.6	
Two-party-preferred result
Labor	Sydney McHugh	28,255	56.7	+20.1
United Australia	Richard Butler	21,549	43.3	−20.1
Labor gain from United Australia		Swing	+20.1	

==== 1937 ====
1937 Australian federal election: Wakefield
Party	Candidate	Votes	%	±%
United Australia	Charles Hawker	32,113	63.4	−1.7
Labor	Raymond Davis	18,508	36.6	+17.4
Total formal votes		50,621	96.1	
Informal votes		2,073	3.9	
Turnout		52,694	96.5	
United Australia hold		Swing	−10.6	

==== 1934 ====
1934 Australian federal election: Wakefield
Party	Candidate	Votes	%	±%
United Australia	Charles Hawker	31,493	65.1	−2.8
Labor	Michael Smedley	9,274	19.2	+5.2
Social Credit	Will Duggan	7,615	15.7	+15.7
Total formal votes		48,382	94.9	
Informal votes		2,601	5.1	
Turnout		50,983	95.3	
Two-party-preferred result
United Australia	Charles Hawker		74.0	+8.7
Labor	Michael Smedley		26.0	+26.0
United Australia hold		Swing	+8.7	

==== 1931 ====
1931 Australian federal election: Wakefield
Party	Candidate	Votes	%	±%
Emergency Committee	Charles Hawker	22,596	65.3	+29.2
Independent Country	Maurice Collins	12,030	34.7	+34.7
Total formal votes		34,626	95.4	
Informal votes		1,674	4.6	
Turnout		36,300	96.9	
Emergency Committee hold		Swing	+8.4	

=== Elections in the 1920s ===
==== 1929 ====
1929 Australian federal election: Wakefield
Party	Candidate	Votes	%	±%
Labor	Sydney McHugh	12,503	36.4	+36.4
Nationalist	Charles Hawker	12,417	36.1	−4.3
Country	Maurice Collins	9,437	27.5	−32.1
Total formal votes		34,357	96.5	
Informal votes		1,251	3.5	
Turnout		35,608	96.0	
Two-party-preferred result
Nationalist	Charles Hawker	19,547	56.9	+16.5
Labor	Sydney McHugh	14,810	43.1	+43.1
Nationalist gain from Country		Swing	+16.5	

==== 1928 ====
1928 Australian federal election: Wakefield
Party	Candidate	Votes	%	±%
Country	Maurice Collins	18,813	59.6	+59.6
Nationalist	Richard Foster	12,755	40.4	−24.4
Total formal votes		31,568	89.4	
Informal votes		3,750	10.6	
Turnout		35,318	96.1	
Country gain from Nationalist		Swing	+24.4	

==== 1925 ====
1925 Australian federal election: Wakefield
Party	Candidate	Votes	%	±%
Nationalist	Richard Foster	21,846	64.8	+64.8
Labor	Even George	11,842	35.2	−1.5
Total formal votes		33,688	95.0	
Informal votes		1,773	5.0	
Turnout		35,461	93.3	
Nationalist gain from Liberal		Swing	+9.5	

==== 1922 ====
1922 Australian federal election: Wakefield
Party	Candidate	Votes	%	±%
Liberal	Richard Foster	8,288	42.9	+42.9
Labor	Edward Stokes	7,076	36.7	−2.2
Country	Henry Queale	3,941	20.4	+9.5
Total formal votes		19,305	91.9	
Informal votes		1,698	8.1	
Turnout		21,003	54.4	
Two-party-preferred result
Liberal	Richard Foster	10,680	55.3	+55.3
Labor	Edward Stokes	8,625	44.7	+1.9
Liberal gain from Nationalist		Swing	−1.9	

=== Elections in the 1910s ===
==== 1919 ====
1919 Australian federal election: Wakefield
Party	Candidate	Votes	%	±%
Nationalist	Richard Foster	10,872	49.7	−6.5
Labor	Edward Stokes	8,067	36.9	−6.9
Farmers and Settlers	Herbert Tuck	2,946	13.5	+13.5
Total formal votes		21,885	91.1	
Informal votes		2,133	8.9	
Turnout		24,018	69.8	
Two-party-preferred result
Nationalist	Richard Foster	12,780	58.4	+2.2
Labor	Edward Stokes	9,105	41.6	−2.2
Nationalist hold		Swing	+2.2	

==== 1917 ====
1917 Australian federal election: Wakefield
Party	Candidate	Votes	%	±%
Nationalist	Richard Foster	13,706	56.2	+3.8
Labor	Norman Makin	10,663	43.8	−3.8
Total formal votes		24,369	96.6	
Informal votes		849	3.4	
Turnout		25,218	73.0	
Nationalist hold		Swing	+3.8	

==== 1914 ====
1914 Australian federal election: Wakefield
Party	Candidate	Votes	%	±%
Liberal	Richard Foster	14,505	52.4	−1.3
Labor	William Harvey	13,197	47.6	+1.3
Total formal votes		27,702	97.6	
Informal votes		695	2.4	
Turnout		28,397	84.7	
Liberal hold		Swing	−1.3	

==== 1913 ====
1913 Australian federal election: Wakefield
Party	Candidate	Votes	%	±%
Liberal	Richard Foster	14,193	53.7	+3.8
Labor	William Harvey	12,213	46.3	−2.1
Total formal votes		26,406	94.8	
Informal votes		1,450	5.2	
Turnout		27,856	84.2	
Liberal hold		Swing	+2.9	

==== 1910 ====
1910 Australian federal election: Wakefield
Party	Candidate	Votes	%	±%
Liberal	Richard Foster	8,702	49.9	+49.9
Labour	John Vaughan	8,454	48.4	+12.2
Young Australia	Charles Horne	296	1.7	+1.7
Total formal votes		17,452	95.1	
Informal votes		890	4.9	
Turnout		18,342	58.9	
Liberal hold		Swing	+49.9	

=== Elections in the 1900s ===
1909 Wakefield by-election
Party	Candidate	Votes	%	±%
Liberal	Richard Foster	8,120	54.5	+54.5
Labour	John Vaughan	6,789	45.5	+9.3
Total formal votes		14,909	99.3	
Informal votes		89	0.6	
Turnout		14,998	48.7	
Liberal gain from Independent		Swing	−9.3	

==== 1906 ====
1906 Australian federal election: Wakefield
Party	Candidate	Votes	%	±%
Independent	Sir Frederick Holder	6,972	63.8	−36.2
Labour	John Vaughan	3,953	36.2	+36.2
Total formal votes		10,925	95.1	
Informal votes		560	4.9	
Turnout		11,485	41.7	
Independent hold		Swing	−36.2	

==== 1903 ====
1903 Australian federal election: Wakefield
Party	Candidate	Votes	%	±%
Independent	Sir Frederick Holder	unopposed		
Independent win		(new seat)		
