= Percy Quirke =

Australian politician

Percival Hillam Quirke (29 July 1898 – 25 March 1972) was an Australian politician.

A farmer and soldier prior to entering politics, Quirke contested the normally safely conservative federal seat of Wakefield in a 1938 by-election as an independent. He finished a distant third on the primary vote, with 22.8 percent behind former Liberal and Country League Premier Richard Layton Butler and Labor challenger Sydney McHugh. However, on the second count, almost 83 percent of his preferences flowed to McHugh, enough for McHugh to decisively defeat Butler with 56 percent of the two-party vote.

Quirke later won the South Australian House of Assembly seat of Stanley, serving from 1941 to 1948 as a Labor member. He left Labor in 1948 and continued to contest and win the seat of Stanley as an independent. When Stanley was abolished in the redistribution preceding the 1956 election, he contested and won the seat of Burra, defeating incumbent LCL member George Hawker. He joined the LCL in 1963, continuing to hold Burra until he resigned from politics in 1968.

Quirke and the other independent in the legislature, Tom Stott held the balance of power at the 1962 election. They both provided confidence and supply to the Playford Liberal and Country League (LCL) as a minority government in the hung parliament, allowing Playford to remain in power for what would be his final term. Stott became Speaker of the South Australian House of Assembly following the election. In 1963 Quirke ceased being an independent, joined the LCL, and served in the Playford LCL ministry in the portfolios of Irrigation, Lands, and Repatriation until the LCL lost government at the 1965 election.
