= Jack Duncan-Hughes =

Australian politician

Jack Duncan-Hughes MC
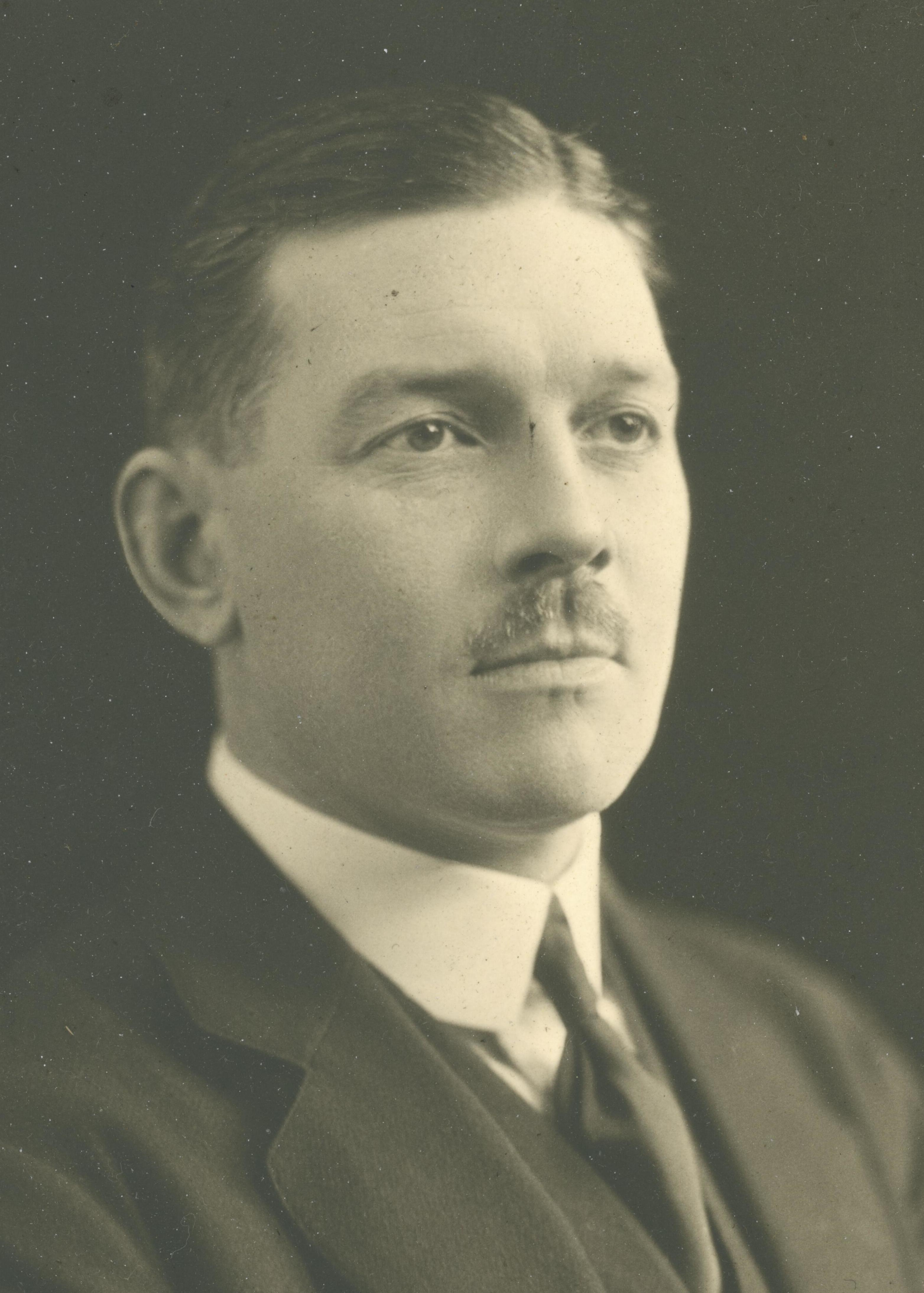
- Duncan-Hughes in 1928

Member of the Australian Parliament for Boothby
- In office 16 December 1922 – 17 November 1928
- Preceded by: William Story
- Succeeded by: John Price

Senator for South Australia
- In office 19 December 1931 – 30 June 1938
- Preceded by: Harry Kneebone

Member of the Australian Parliament for Wakefield
- In office 21 September 1940 – 21 August 1943
- Preceded by: Sydney McHugh
- Succeeded by: Albert Smith

Personal details
- Born: 1 September 1882 Watervale, South Australia
- Died: 13 August 1962 (aged 79)
- Party: Liberal (1922–25); Nationalist (1925–31); UAP (1931–43)
- Education: University of Adelaide; University of Cambridge
- Profession: Barrister

John Grant "Jack" Duncan-Hughes MC (1 September 1882 – 13 August 1962) was an Australian politician. He was a member of the Australian House of Representatives for Boothby from 1922 to 1928, of the Australian Senate for South Australia from 1932 to 1938, and of the House of Representatives for Wakefield from 1940 to 1943. He represented the Nationalist Party (1922–28) and its successor the United Australia Party (1932–38, 1940–43).

== Early life ==
Duncan-Hughes was born at "Hughes Park" near Watervale, South Australia, the son of colonial and state politician Sir John Duncan; his surname was changed to Duncan-Hughes as a child in honour of his great-uncle Sir Walter Watson Hughes. He was educated at St Peters College in Adelaide and Cheltenham College in England and then Trinity College, Cambridge, where he graduated with a Bachelor of Arts (1905), Bachelor of Laws (1906) and Master of Arts (1910). He was admitted to the Bar at the Inner Temple in London in January 1907 and upon returning to Australia was admitted to the South Australian Bar in December 1908. He practised as a solicitor in Adelaide from 1909 until 1914 in partnership with a colleague as Jessop and Duncan Hughes. He was a director of the Wallaroo and Moonta Company and was a member of the state council of the Boy Scouts Association.

== Military service ==
In July 1915, Duncan-Hughes left Australia for England with the intention of serving in World War I and was commissioned as a lieutenant in the Royal Field Artillery of the British Army in September 1915. He served in France and Belgium and was awarded both the Military Cross and the Croix de Guerre in 1918. He returned to Australia in July 1919. He was appointed aide-de-camp to Governor-General of Australia Ronald Munro Ferguson in January 1920 and was attached to the personal staff of the Prince of Wales (the future King Edward VIII) as the representative of the Governor-General on his Australian tour in mid-1920. Duncan-Hughes was promoted to private secretary to the Governor-General in August 1920.

== Politics ==
Duncan-Hughes was elected to the House of Representatives at the 1922 federal election, defeating incumbent fellow Nationalist William Story during a bitter split in the Nationalist Party in South Australia. The federal Nationalist Party in South Australia consisted of members of two separate state parties, the Liberal Union and National Party, which had had a bitter falling out around the 1921 state election. This led the more dominant Liberal Union to oppose all federal Nationalist MPs who were members of the state National Party at the 1922 election. Story, the incumbent Boothby MP, was a member of the National Party, and Duncan-Hughes was selected to challenge him. In the resulting three-cornered contest, Duncan-Hughes topped the poll on primaries, narrowly ahead of Labor, with Story finishing third, and Duncan-Hughes then won the seat on Story's preferences. Duncan-Hughes and his colleague Malcolm Cameron were invited to participate in the first post-election meeting of the Nationalist caucus on 17 January 1923. In reference to the position of Prime Minister Billy Hughes, he reportedly "explained that he would support the Nationalist party, but he held no reservations on the question of leadership".

Duncan-Hughes held Boothby until his defeat in 1928. In 1932, he was elected to the Senate as a United Australia Party Senator for South Australia, but retired at the end of that term in 1938. He came out of retirement at the 1940 federal election in an attempt to win back the Wakefield seat after it had been lost to Labor at a by-election following the death of Charles Hawker; he won the seat, but was defeated in 1943 after only one term.

== Personal life ==
During his political career, he also served as the president of the Adelaide Club from 1935 to 1937 and was a board member of the Wyatt Benevolent Institution. He died at his home at Medindie in 1962 and was buried at Penwortham Cemetery. In 1963, a collection of 6,200 volumes accumulated by Duncan-Hughes was donated to the National Library of Australia.

His brother, Walter Gordon Duncan, was a long-serving member of the South Australian Legislative Council.

Parliament of Australia
| Preceded by William Story | Member for Boothby; 1922 – 1928 | Succeeded by John Price |
| Preceded by Sydney McHugh | Member for Wakefield; 1940 – 1943 | Succeeded by Albert Smith |
