= 1938 Wakefield by-election =

10 December 1938
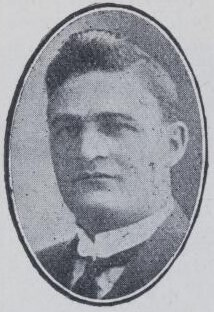

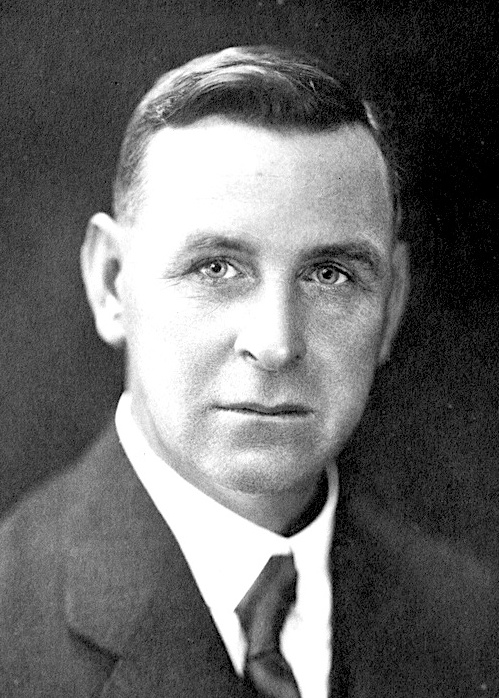
	First party	Second party	Third party
			IND
Candidate	Sydney McHugh	Richard L. Butler	Percy Quirke
Party	Labor	United Australia	Independent
Popular vote	18,870	19,591	11,343
Percentage	37.9%	39.3%	22.8%
Swing	▲1.3pp	▼24.1pp	▲22.8pp
TPP	56.7%	43.3%
TPP swing	▲20.1pp	▼20.1pp
MP before election
Charles Hawker
United Australia
Elected MP
Sydney McHugh
Labor

A by-election was held for the Australian House of Representatives seat of Wakefield on 10 December 1938. This was triggered by the death of United Australia MP Charles Hawker.

The election was won by Labor candidate Sydney McHugh from a massive 20 percent two-party swing.

== Results ==
Wakefield by-election, 1938
Party	Candidate	Votes	%	±%
United Australia	Richard Layton Butler	19,591	39.3	−24.1
Labor	Sydney McHugh	18,870	37.9	+1.3
Independent	Percy Quirke	11,343	22.8	+22.8
Total formal votes		49,804	97.8	+1.7
Informal votes		1,114	2.2	−1.7
Turnout		50,918	93.6	−2.9
Two-party-preferred result
Labor	Sydney McHugh	28,255	56.7	+20.1
United Australia	Richard Layton Butler	21,549	43.3	−20.1
Labor gain from United Australia		Swing	+20.1	

== See also ==
- List of Australian federal by-elections
