= Bert Kelly =

Australian politician (1912–1997)

The Honourable Bert Kelly CMG
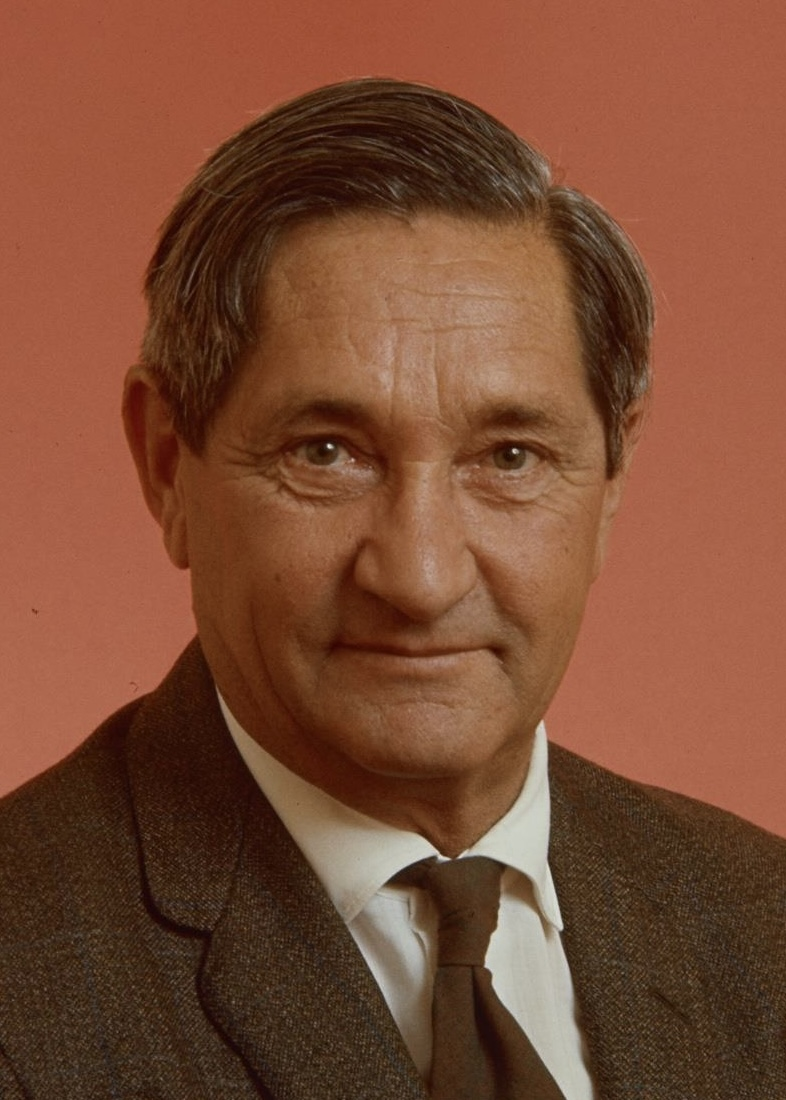
- Kelly in 1974

Minister for the Navy
- In office 28 February 1968 – 12 November 1969
- Prime Minister: John Gorton
- Preceded by: Don Chipp
- Succeeded by: Jim Killen

Minister for Works
- In office 28 February 1967 – 28 February 1968
- Prime Minister: Harold Holt; John McEwen; John Gorton
- Preceded by: John Gorton
- Succeeded by: Reg Wright

Member of the Australian Parliament for Wakefield
- In office 22 November 1958 – 10 November 1977
- Preceded by: Philip McBride
- Succeeded by: Geoffrey Giles

Personal details
- Born: 22 June 1912 Riverton, South Australia, Australia
- Died: 17 January 1997 (aged 84) Myrtle Bank, South Australia, Australia
- Party: Liberal
- Spouse: Lorna Hill (m. 1936)
- Relations: Robert Kelly (grandfather)
- Education: Prince Alfred College
- Occupation: Farmer

Charles Robert "Bert" Kelly CMG (22 June 1912 – 17 January 1997) was an Australian politician. He was a member of the Liberal Party and was an influential campaigner for free trade and the elimination of tariffs. He held ministerial office under Harold Holt and John Gorton as Minister for Navy (1967–1968) and Minister for Works (1968–1969). He represented the South Australian seat of Wakefield in the House of Representatives from 1958 to 1977.

== Early life ==
Kelly was born on 22 June 1912 in Riverton, South Australia. He was the son of Ada May (née Dawson) and William Stanley Kelly. His grandfather Robert Kelly had been a member of parliament in the 1890s.

Kelly was raised on his father's farming property "Merrindie" near Tarlee. He attended the local public school and then boarded at Prince Alfred College in Adelaide from 1925 to 1929. After leaving school he returned to the family farm. As W. S. Kelly and Sons, he and his father bred prize-winning Dorset Horn sheep, including championship honours at the Melbourne Royal Show. In 1942, Kelly listed in the Royal Australian Air Force (RAAF) and undertook air crew training. He subsequently transferred to the Air Force Reserve in order to remain in South Australia.

In 1951, Kelly was awarded a Nuffield Fellowship to study farming in the United Kingdom. He was also appointed to the South Australian Advisory Board on Agriculture, of which his father had also been a member. He was introduced to economic policy by his father, who served on the federal government's Tariff Board in the 1930s and was an advisor to Douglas Copland on agricultural product pricing during World War II.

== Political career ==
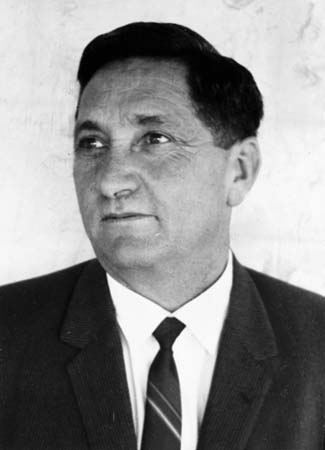
Kelly in 1964

Along with his family political connections, an early political influence on Kelly was South Australian MP Charles Hawker, whom Kelly later described as a "hero".

Kelly was elected as the Liberal Party member for the House of Representatives seat of Wakefield at the 1958 election. He was a passionate supporter of free trade, when this was very much a minority opinion in Australia. Kelly was Minister for Works from February 1967 to February 1968 in the Holt and Gorton ministries and then Minister for the Navy until November 1969. As navy minister he dealt with the aftermath of the Melbourne–Evans collision in June 1969. His period as minister may have been limited by his free trade views.

After Kelly's departure from the ministry, he wrote a column in the Australian Financial Review, Modest Member, supporting free trade. When the seat of Angas was abolished in 1977, its member Geoffrey Giles beat Kelly for preselection for Wakefield.

== Later life ==
Kelly renamed his column "Modest Farmer" and it was published successively in the Australian Financial Review, The Bulletin and The Australian. He was invested as a Companion of the Most Distinguished Order of St Michael and St George (CMG) in 1980. Kelly's funeral was attended by former Labor Prime Minister Gough Whitlam and Ray Evans, the former head of Western Mining Corporation and president of the right-wing H. R. Nicholls Society.

Bert was opposed to protectionism … because it created a situation in which governments, in the person of ministers or officials, granted arbitrary and capricious favours to some, who were thus greatly enriched, at the expense of others, who were at best impoverished and at worst, ruined.

— Ray Evans

No private member has had as much influence in changing a major policy of the major parties.

— Gough Whitlam

== Personal life ==
In 1936, Kelly married Lorna Hill, with whom he had three sons.

Kelly's grandson Craig Kelly and great grandson Jake Kelly both played Australian rules football in the professional Australian Football League.

Political offices
Preceded by John Gorton	Minister for Works; 1967–68	Succeeded by Reg Wright
Preceded by Don Chipp	Minister for the Navy; 1968–69	Succeeded by James Killen
Parliament of Australia
Preceded by Philip McBride	Member for Wakefield; 1958–77	Succeeded by Geoffrey Giles
