= Minister for Defence (Australia) =

Australian cabinet position

- Commonwealth Coat of Arms

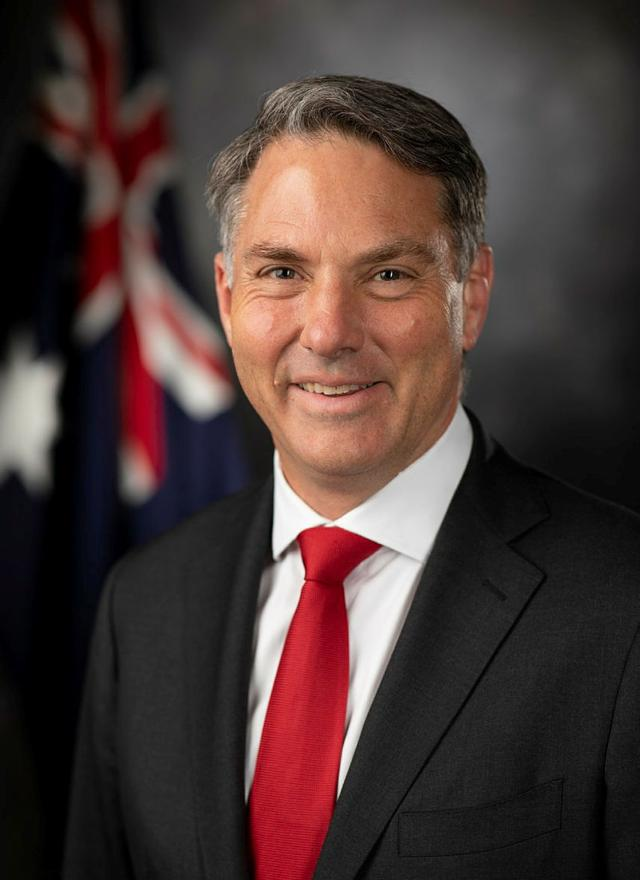
- Incumbent; Richard Marles since 1 June 2022
- Department of Defence
- Style: The Honourable (formal)
- Member of: Parliament; Cabinet; Federal Executive Council; National Security Committee
- Seat: Canberra
- Appointer: Governor-General on the advice the prime minister
- Term length: At the Governor-General's pleasure
- Formation: 1 January 1901
- First holder: James Dickson
- Salary: $364,406
- Website: www.minister.defence.gov.au/current-ministers/2022-06/richard-marles

The minister for defence is the minister of state of the Commonwealth of Australia charged with overseeing the organisation, implementation, and formulation of strategic policy in defence and military matters as the head of the Department of Defence. The minister for defence is responsible for the Australian Defence Organisation, including the Australian Defence Force (ADF). The current defence minister is Richard Marles, who is also concurrently serving as deputy prime minister of Australia, having been selected by Prime Minister Anthony Albanese in May 2022 following the 2022 Australian federal election.

As the minister for defence is responsible for the management of Australia's defence and military forces and the portfolio's accountability to the Parliament, the secretary of defence is required under section 63(1) of the Public Service Act 1999 and the Requirements for Annual Reports from the Parliamentary Joint Committee on Public Accounts and Audit to submit a report to the responsible ministers on the activities of the Department of Defence after the end of each financial year for presentation to the Parliament.

It is one of only four ministerial positions (along with the prime minister, attorney-general and treasurer) that have existed since Federation.

== Defence policy ==
The defence minister is primarily responsible for implementing government defence policy. The three main entities responsible for formulating defence policy within Defence are the Air Power Development Centre, Australian Strategic Policy Institute, and Sea Power Centre. Additionally, the minister releases white papers, that assess Australia's current defence capabilities and set out areas of reform.

The most recent white paper publication is the 2016 Defence White Paper that includes three elements: the 2016 Defence White Paper itself, 2016 Integrated Investment Program, and 2016 Defence Industry Policy Statement. It is the eighth defence white paper since 1976.

== Composition of the defence portfolio ==
Over the years there have been a number of ministers with a variety of functions involved in the defence portfolio; in the period November 1939 to April 1942, there was no position named minister of defence. Instead, several ministers were responsible for the various tasks and duties that are presently under the purview of the minister for Defence.

Previous governments have included ministers with titles using one or more of the following terms:

- Air
- Aircraft production
- Army
- Defence
- Defence Coordination
- Defence Industry
- Defence Materiel
- Defence Personnel
- Defence Production
- Defence Science
- Defence Support
- Development
- Munitions
- Navy
- Repatriation
- Shipping
- Supply
- Veterans' Affairs

== List of ministers for defence ==
There was a Minister for Defence from 1 January 1901 until 13 November 1939, with the exception of two small breaks. Robert Menzies, the Prime Minister, abolished the position on the outbreak of World War II and created separate Ministers for the Navy, the Army and the Air, with himself as Minister for Defence Coordination in his first ministry. He retained this position until the fall of his government, and then held the post in the brief government of Arthur Fadden. John Curtin initially followed the same arrangement as Menzies in his ministry until 14 April 1942, when he took the title of Minister for Defence. The separate titles of Ministers for the Navy, the Army and the Air were abolished in the second Whitlam Ministry on 30 November 1973, when the separate departments of Navy, Army and Air were also abolished. There had also been a separate Navy portfolio between 1915 and 1921.

The following have served as Minister for Defence:

Order	Minister	Party	Prime Minister	Term start	Term end	Term in office
1	Sir James Dickson KCMG MP	Protectionist	Barton	1 January 1901	10 January 1901	9 days
2	John Forrest CMG MP	Protectionist	Barton	17 January 1901	10 August 1903	2 years, 205 days
3	Senator James Drake	Protectionist	Barton	10 August 1903	24 September 1903	45 days
4	Austin Chapman MP	Protectionist	Deakin	24 September 1903	27 April 1904	216 days
5	Senator Anderson Dawson	Labor	Watson	27 April 1904	18 August 1904	113 days
6	James McCay MP	Protectionist	Reid	18 August 1904	5 July 1905	321 days
7	Senator Thomas Playford	Protectionist	Deakin	5 July 1905	31 December 1906	1 year, 203 days
8	Sir Thomas Ewing KCMG MP	Protectionist	Deakin	24 January 1907	13 November 1908	1 year, 294 days
9	Senator George Pearce (Note: Although McBride served the longest continuously, Pearce had the longest combined service at more than 13 years, and as a member of four parties (Labor, National Labor, Nationalist, and UAP).)	Labor	Fisher	13 November 1908	2 June 1909	201 days
10	Joseph Cook MP	Liberal	Deakin	2 June 1909	29 April 1910	331 days
(9)	Senator George Pearce	Labor	Fisher	29 April 1910	24 June 1913	3 years, 56 days
11	Senator Edward Millen	Liberal	Cook	24 June 1913	17 September 1914	1 year, 85 days
(9)	Senator George Pearce	Labor	Fisher	17 September 1914	27 October 1915	7 years, 95 days
(9)	Senator George Pearce	Labor	Hughes	27 October 1915	14 November 1916	7 years, 95 days
(9)	Senator George Pearce	National Labor	Hughes	14 November 1916	13 June 1917 (Note: The Liberal and National Labor parties approved a coalition agreement on 13 February 1917, and the new ministry was sworn on 17 February 1917. The parties co-ordinated their campaign against Labor at the 1917 election, and while there was some discussion of the two parties remaining separate, they formally merged on 13 June 1917.)	7 years, 95 days
(9)	Senator George Pearce	Nationalist	Hughes	13 June 1917	21 December 1921	7 years, 95 days
12	Walter Massy-Greene MP (Note: The Parliamentary Handbook erroneously records Massy-Greene as Assistant Minister for Defence from 1921 to 1923. He was in fact the Minister for Defence. He retained responsibility for Health, which he had held as Minister for Trade and Customs, and was consequently titled Minister for Defence and Health.)	Nationalist	Hughes	21 December 1921	9 February 1923	1 year, 50 days
13	Eric Bowden MP	Nationalist	Bruce	9 February 1923	16 January 1925	1 year, 342 days
14	Sir Neville Howse VC KCB KCMG MP	Nationalist	Bruce	16 January 1925	2 April 1927	2 years, 76 days
15	Senator Sir William Glasgow KCB CMG DSO VD	Nationalist	Bruce	2 April 1927	22 October 1929	2 years, 203 days
16	Albert Green MP	Labor	Scullin	22 October 1929	4 February 1931	1 year, 105 days
17	Senator John Daly	Labor	Scullin	4 February 1931	3 March 1931	27 days
18	Ben Chifley MP	Labor	Scullin	3 March 1931	6 January 1932	309 days
(9)	Senator Sir George Pearce KCVO	United; Australia	Lyons	6 January 1932	12 October 1934	2 years, 279 days
19	Sir Archdale Parkhill KCMG MP	United; Australia	Lyons	12 October 1934	20 November 1937	3 years, 39 days
20	Joseph Lyons CH MP	United; Australia	Lyons	20 November 1937	29 November 1937	9 days
21	Harold Thorby MP	Country	Lyons	29 November 1937	7 November 1938	343 days
22	Geoffrey Street MC MP	United; Australia	Lyons	7 November 1938	7 April 1939	1 year, 6 days
22	Geoffrey Street MC MP	United; Australia	Page	7 April 1939	26 April 1939	1 year, 6 days
22	Geoffrey Street MC MP	United; Australia	Menzies	26 April 1939	13 November 1939	1 year, 6 days
23	Robert Menzies MP (Note: On 13 November 1939, early in the Second World War, Menzies divided the Defence portfolio into separate Army, Navy and Air portfolios and appointed himself Minister for Defence Coordination to oversee them. Curtin retained this arrangement, but he reverted to the title Minister for Defence on 21 September 1943.)	United; Australia	Menzies	13 November 1939	29 August 1941	1 year, 328 days
23	Robert Menzies MP	United; Australia	Fadden	29 August 1941	7 October 1941	1 year, 328 days
24	John Curtin MP	Labor	Curtin	7 October 1941	6 July 1945	3 years, 272 days
25	Jack Beasley MP	Labor	Forde	6 July 1945	13 July 1945	1 year, 39 days
25	Jack Beasley MP	Labor	Chifley	13 July 1945	14 August 1946	1 year, 39 days
26	Frank Forde MP	Labor	Chifley	15 August 1946	1 November 1946	79 days
27	John Dedman MP	Labor	Chifley	1 November 1946	19 December 1949	3 years, 48 days
28	Eric Harrison MP	Liberal	Menzies	19 December 1949	24 October 1950	309 days
29	Sir Philip McBride KCMG MP	Liberal	Menzies	24 October 1950	10 December 1958	8 years, 47 days
30	Athol Townley MP	Liberal	Menzies	10 December 1958	18 December 1963	5 years, 8 days
31	Paul Hasluck MP	Liberal	Menzies	18 December 1963	24 April 1964	128 days
32	Senator Sir Shane Paltridge KBE	Liberal	Menzies	24 April 1964	19 January 1966	1 year, 270 days
33	Allen Fairhall MP	Liberal	Holt	26 January 1966	12 December 1967	3 years, 297 days
33	Allen Fairhall MP	Liberal	McEwen	12 December 1967	10 January 1968	3 years, 297 days
33	Allen Fairhall MP	Liberal	Gorton	10 January 1968	12 November 1969	3 years, 297 days
34	Malcolm Fraser MP	Liberal	Gorton	12 November 1969	8 March 1971	1 year, 116 days
35	John Gorton CH MP	Liberal	McMahon	19 March 1971	13 August 1971	147 days
36	David Fairbairn DFC MP	Liberal	McMahon	13 August 1971	5 December 1972	1 year, 114 days
37	Lance Barnard MP	Labor	Whitlam	5 December 1972	6 June 1975	2 years, 183 days
38	Bill Morrison MP	Labor	Whitlam	6 June 1975	11 November 1975	158 days
39	Sir James Killen KCMG MP	Liberal	Fraser	12 November 1975	7 May 1982	6 years, 176 days
40	Ian Sinclair MP	National Country	Fraser	7 May 1982	16 October 1982	308 days
40	Ian Sinclair MP	National	Fraser	16 October 1982	11 March 1983	308 days
41	Gordon Scholes MP	Labor	Hawke	11 March 1983	13 December 1984	1 year, 277 days
42	Kim Beazley MP	Labor	Hawke	13 December 1984	4 April 1990	5 years, 112 days
43	Senator Robert Ray	Labor	Hawke	4 April 1990	20 December 1991	5 years, 342 days
43	Senator Robert Ray	Labor	Keating	20 December 1991	11 March 1996	5 years, 342 days
44	Ian McLachlan AO MP	Liberal	Howard	11 March 1996	21 October 1998	2 years, 224 days
45	John Moore MP	Liberal	Howard	21 October 1998	30 January 2001	2 years, 101 days
46	Peter Reith MP	Liberal	Howard	30 January 2001	26 November 2001	300 days
47	Senator Robert Hill	Liberal	Howard	26 November 2001	20 January 2006	4 years, 55 days
48	Brendan Nelson MP	Liberal	Howard	20 January 2006	3 December 2007	1 year, 317 days
49	Joel Fitzgibbon MP	Labor	Rudd	3 December 2007	9 June 2009	1 year, 188 days
50	Senator John Faulkner	Labor	Rudd	9 June 2009	24 June 2010	1 year, 97 days
50	Senator John Faulkner	Labor	Gillard	24 June 2010	14 September 2010	1 year, 97 days
51	Stephen Smith MP	Labor	Gillard	14 September 2010	27 June 2013	3 years, 4 days
51	Stephen Smith MP	Labor	Rudd	27 June 2013	18 September 2013	3 years, 4 days
52	Senator David Johnston	Liberal	Abbott	18 September 2013	23 December 2014	1 year, 96 days
53	Kevin Andrews MP	Liberal	Abbott	23 December 2014	15 September 2015	272 days
53	Kevin Andrews MP	Liberal	Turnbull	15 September 2015	21 September 2015	272 days
54	Senator Marise Payne	Liberal	Turnbull	21 September 2015	24 August 2018	2 years, 341 days
54	Senator Marise Payne	Liberal	Morrison	24 August 2018	28 August 2018	2 years, 341 days
55	Christopher Pyne MP	Liberal	Morrison	28 August 2018	26 May 2019	271 days
56	Senator Linda Reynolds CSC	Liberal	Morrison	29 May 2019	30 March 2021	1 year, 305 days
57	Peter Dutton MP	Liberal	Morrison	30 March 2021	23 May 2022	1 year, 54 days
58	Richard Marles MP	Labor	Albanese	1 June 2022	Incumbent	4 years, 98 days

== List of assistant ministers for defence ==
The following individuals have been appointed as Assistant Minister for Defence, or any of its precedent titles:

Order	Minister	Party	Prime Minister	Title	Term start	Term end	Term in office
1	Granville Ryrie MP (Note: The Parliamentary Handbook erroneously records that Ryrie ceased to be Assistant Minister for Defence, being replaced by Massy-Greene. In fact, Massy-Greene was appointed Minister for Defence, and Ryrie remained in post.)	Nationalist	Hughes	Assistant Minister for Defence	4 February 1920	5 February 1923	3 years, 1 day
2	Josiah Francis	United Australia	Lyons	Assistant Minister for Defence	6 January 1932	12 October 1934	2 years, 279 days
3	Reg Bishop	Labor	Whitlam	Minister Assisting the Minister for Defence	19 December 1972	12 June 1974	1 year, 175 days
4	Bill Morrison	Labor	Whitlam	Minister Assisting the Minister for Defence	12 June 1974	6 June 1975	359 days
5	Reg Bishop	Labor	Whitlam	Minister Assisting the Minister for Defence	6 June 1975	11 November 1975	158 days
6	John McLeay Jr.	Liberal	Fraser	Minister Assisting the Minister for Defence	22 December 1975	3 November 1980	4 years, 317 days
7	Kevin Newman	Liberal	Fraser	Minister Assisting the Minister for Defence	3 November 1980	7 May 1982	1 year, 185 days
8	Ian Viner	Liberal	Fraser	Minister Assisting the Minister for Defence	7 May 1982	11 March 1983	308 days
9	Kim Beazley	Labor	Hawke	Minister Assisting the Minister for Defence	11 March 1983	13 December 1984	1 year, 277 days
10	John Brown	Labor	Hawke	Minister Assisting the Minister for Defence	13 December 1984	24 July 1987	2 years, 223 days
11	Michael Duffy	Labor	Hawke	Minister Assisting the Minister for Defence	13 December 1984	24 July 1987	2 years, 223 days
12	Roger Price	Labor	Keating	Parliamentary Secretary to the Minister for Defence	27 December 1991	24 March 1993	1 year, 87 days
13	Gary Punch	Labor	Keating	Parliamentary Secretary to the Minister for Defence	25 March 1993	25 March 1994	1 year, 0 days
14	Arch Bevis	Labor	Keating	Parliamentary Secretary to the Minister for Defence	25 March 1993	11 March 1996	1 year, 352 days
15	Bruce Scott	National	Howard	Minister assisting the Minister for Defence	21 October 1998	26 November 2001	3 years, 36 days
16	Danna Vale	Liberal	Howard	Minister assisting the Minister for Defence	26 November 2001	7 October 2003	1 year, 315 days
17	Mal Brough	Liberal	Howard	Minister assisting the Minister for Defence	7 October 2003	18 July 2004	285 days
18	Fran Bailey	Liberal	Howard	Minister assisting the Minister for Defence	18 July 2004	22 October 2004	285 days
19	De-Anne Kelly	National	Howard	Minister assisting the Minister for Defence	22 October 2004	27 January 2006	1 year, 97 days
20	Bruce Billson	Liberal	Howard	Minister assisting the Minister for Defence	27 January 2006	3 December 2007	1 year, 310 days
21	Stuart Robert	Liberal	Abbott	Assistant Minister for Defence	18 September 2013	15 September 2015	2 years, 3 days
21	Stuart Robert	Liberal	Turnbull	Assistant Minister for Defence	15 September 2015	21 September 2015	2 years, 3 days
22	Darren Chester	National	Turnbull	Assistant Minister for Defence	21 September 2015	18 February 2016	150 days
23	Michael McCormack	National	Turnbull	Assistant Minister for Defence	18 February 2016	19 July 2016	152 days
24	David Fawcett	Liberal	Morrison	Assistant Minister for Defence	26 August 2018	29 May 2019	276 days
25	Alex Hawke	Liberal	Morrison	Assistant Minister for Defence	29 May 2019	22 December 2020	1 year, 207 days
26	Andrew Hastie	Liberal	Morrison	Assistant Minister for Defence	22 December 2020	23 May 2022	1 year, 152 days
27	Matt Thistlethwaite	Labor	Albanese	Assistant Minister for Defence	1 June 2022	29 July 2024	2 years, 58 days
28	Peter Khalil	Labor	Albanese	Assistant Minister for Defence	13 May 2025	Incumbent	1 year, 117 days

== Individual service branch ministers ==
=== Ministers for the Navy ===
The following served as Minister for the Navy:

Order	Minister	Party	Prime Minister	Term start	Term end	Term in office
1	Jens Jensen MP	Labor	Fisher	12 July 1915	27 October 1915	1 year, 220 days
1	Jens Jensen MP	Labor	Hughes	27 October 1915	14 November 1916	1 year, 220 days
1	Jens Jensen MP	National Labor	Hughes	14 November 1916	17 February 1917	1 year, 220 days
2	Joseph Cook MP	Commonwealth; Liberal	Hughes	17 February 1917	13 June 1917	3 years, 162 days
2	Joseph Cook MP	Nationalist	Hughes	13 June 1917	28 July 1920	3 years, 162 days
3	William Laird Smith MP	Nationalist	Hughes	28 July 1920	21 December 1921	1 year, 146 days
4	Frederick Stewart MP	United; Australia	Menzies	13 November 1939	14 March 1940	122 days
5	Archie Cameron MP	Country	Menzies	14 March 1940	28 October 1940	228 days
6	Billy Hughes MP	United; Australia	Menzies	28 October 1940	29 August 1941	344 days
6	Billy Hughes MP	United; Australia	Fadden	29 August 1941	7 October 1941	344 days
7	Norman Makin MP	Labor	Curtin	7 October 1941	6 July 1945	4 years, 312 days
7	Norman Makin MP	Labor	Forde	6 July 1945	13 July 1945	4 years, 312 days
7	Norman Makin MP	Labor	Chifley	13 July 1945	15 August 1946	4 years, 312 days
8	Arthur Drakeford MP	Labor	Chifley	15 August 1946	1 November 1946	78 days
9	Bill Riordan MP	Labor	Chifley	1 November 1946	19 December 1949	3 years, 48 days
10	Josiah Francis MP	Liberal	Menzies	19 December 1949	11 May 1951	1 year, 143 days
11	Philip McBride MP	Liberal	Menzies	11 May 1951	17 July 1951	67 days
12	William McMahon MP	Liberal	Menzies	17 July 1951	9 July 1954	2 years, 357 days
(10)	Josiah Francis MP	Liberal	Menzies	9 July 1954	11 July 1955	1 year, 2 days
13	Eric Harrison MP	Liberal	Menzies	11 July 1955	11 January 1956	184 days
14	Senator Neil O'Sullivan	Liberal	Menzies	11 January 1956	24 October 1956	287 days
15	Charles Davidson MP	Country	Menzies	24 October 1956	10 December 1958	2 years, 47 days
16	Senator John Gorton	Liberal	Menzies	10 December 1958	18 December 1963	5 years, 8 days
17	Jim Forbes MP	Liberal	Menzies	18 December 1963	4 March 1964	77 days
18	Fred Chaney, Sr. MP	Liberal	Menzies	4 March 1964	26 January 1966	2 years, 285 days
18	Fred Chaney, Sr. MP	Liberal	Holt	26 January 1966	14 December 1966	2 years, 285 days
19	Don Chipp MP	Liberal	Holt	14 December 1966	19 December 1967	1 year, 76 days
19	Don Chipp MP	Liberal	McEwen	19 December 1967	10 January 1968	1 year, 76 days
19	Don Chipp MP	Liberal	Gorton	10 January 1968	28 February 1968	1 year, 76 days
20	Bert Kelly MP	Liberal	Gorton	28 February 1968	12 November 1969	1 year, 257 days
21	James Killen MP	Liberal	Gorton	12 November 1969	10 March 1971	1 year, 130 days
21	James Killen MP	Liberal	McMahon	10 March 1971	22 March 1971	1 year, 130 days
22	Malcolm Mackay MP	Liberal	McMahon	22 March 1971	5 December 1972	1 year, 258 days
23	Lance Barnard MP	Labor	Whitlam	5 December 1972	30 November 1973	360 days

=== Ministers for the Army ===
The following served as Minister for the Army:

Order	Minister	Party	Prime Minister	Term start	Term end	Term in office
1	Geoffrey Street MP	United; Australia	Menzies	13 November 1939	28 October 1940	350 days
2	Senator Percy Spender	United; Australia	Menzies	28 October 1940	29 August 1941	344 days
2	Senator Percy Spender	United; Australia	Fadden	29 August 1941	7 October 1941	344 days
3	Frank Forde MP	Labor	Curtin	7 October 1941	6 July 1945	5 years, 25 days
3	Frank Forde MP	Labor	Forde	6 July 1945	13 July 1945	5 years, 25 days
3	Frank Forde MP	Labor	Chifley	13 July 1945	1 November 1946	5 years, 25 days
4	Cyril Chambers MP	Labor	Chifley	1 November 1946	19 December 1949	3 years, 48 days
5	Josiah Francis MP	Liberal	Menzies	19 December 1949	7 November 1955	5 years, 323 days
6	Eric Harrison MP	Liberal	Menzies	7 November 1955	28 February 1956	113 days
7	John Cramer MP	Liberal	Menzies	28 February 1956	18 December 1963	7 years, 293 days
8	Jim Forbes MP	Liberal	Menzies	18 December 1963	26 January 1966	2 years, 39 days
9	Malcolm Fraser MP	Liberal	Holt	26 January 1966	19 December 1967	2 years, 33 days
9	Malcolm Fraser MP	Liberal	McEwen	19 December 1967	10 January 1968	2 years, 33 days
9	Malcolm Fraser MP	Liberal	Gorton	10 January 1968	28 February 1968	2 years, 33 days
10	Phillip Lynch MP	Liberal	Gorton	28 February 1968	12 November 1969	1 year, 257 days
11	Andrew Peacock MP	Liberal	Gorton	12 November 1969	10 March 1971	2 years, 82 days
11	Andrew Peacock MP	Liberal	McMahon	10 March 1971	2 February 1972	2 years, 82 days
12	Bob Katter, Sr. MP	Country	McMahon	2 February 1972	5 December 1972	309 days
13	Lance Barnard MP	Labor	Whitlam	5 December 1972	30 November 1973	360 days

=== Ministers for Air ===
The following served as Minister for Air:

Order	Minister	Party	Prime Minister	Term start	Term end	Term in office
1	James Fairbairn MP	United; Australia	Menzies	13 November 1939	13 August 1940	274 days
2	Arthur Fadden MP	Country	Menzies	14 August 1940	28 October 1940	75 days
3	John McEwen MP	Country	Menzies	28 October 1940	29 August 1941	344 days
3	John McEwen MP	Country	Fadden	29 August 1941	7 October 1941	344 days
4	Arthur Drakeford MP	Labor	Curtin	7 October 1941	6 July 1945	8 years, 73 days
4	Arthur Drakeford MP	Labor	Forde	6 July 1945	13 July 1945	8 years, 73 days
4	Arthur Drakeford MP	Labor	Chifley	13 July 1945	19 December 1949	8 years, 73 days
5	Thomas White MP	Liberal	Menzies	19 December 1949	11 May 1951	1 year, 143 days
6	Philip McBride MP	Liberal	Menzies	11 May 1951	17 July 1951	67 days
7	William McMahon MP	Liberal	Menzies	17 July 1951	9 July 1954	2 years, 357 days
8	Athol Townley MP	Liberal	Menzies	9 July 1954	24 October 1956	2 years, 107 days
9	Frederick Osborne MP	Liberal	Menzies	24 October 1956	29 December 1960	4 years, 66 days
10	Senator Harrie Wade	Liberal	Menzies	29 December 1960	22 December 1961	358 days
11	Les Bury MP	Liberal	Menzies	22 December 1961	27 July 1962	217 days
12	David Fairbairn MP	Liberal	Menzies	27 July 1962	10 June 1964	1 year, 319 days
13	Peter Howson MP	Liberal	Menzies	10 June 1964	26 January 1966	3 years, 263 days
13	Peter Howson MP	Liberal	Holt	26 January 1966	19 December 1967	3 years, 263 days
13	Peter Howson MP	Liberal	McEwen	19 December 1967	10 January 1968	3 years, 263 days
13	Peter Howson MP	Liberal	Gorton	10 January 1968	28 February 1968	3 years, 263 days
14	Gordon Freeth MP	Liberal	Gorton	28 February 1968	13 February 1969	351 days
15	Dudley Erwin MP	Liberal	Gorton	13 February 1969	12 November 1969	272 days
16	Senator Tom Drake-Brockman	Country	Gorton	12 November 1969	10 March 1971	3 years, 23 days
16	Senator Tom Drake-Brockman	Country	McMahon	10 March 1971	5 December 1972	3 years, 23 days
17	Lance Barnard MP	Labor	Whitlam	5 December 1972	30 November 1973	360 days

== See also ==
- Department of Defence (Australia)
- Department of Munitions (11 June 1940 — April 1948)
- Minister for Defence Industry
- Minister for Defence Personnel
- Minister for Veterans' Affairs (Australia)
- Defence Estate and Infrastructure Group
