= Maurice Collins (politician) =

Australian politician (1878–1945)

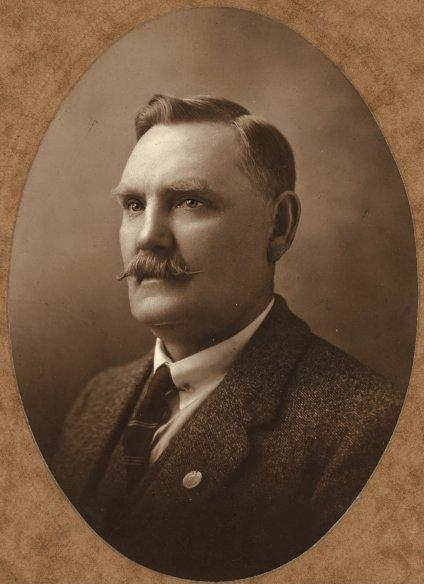

Member of the Australian Parliament for Wakefield
- In office 17 November 1928 – 12 October 1929
- Preceded by: Richard Foster
- Succeeded by: Charles Hawker

Personal details
- Born: 1878 Mount Bryan, South Australia
- Died: 9 August 1945 (aged 66–67)
- Party: Australian Country Party
- Occupation: Grazier

Maurice Collins (1878 – 9 August 1945) was an Australian politician. He was a Country Party member of the Australian House of Representatives from 1928 to 1929, representing the electorate of Wakefield. He was reported to be "one of the best known personalities in the pastoral industry" in South Australia.

Collins was born at Mount Bryan, the seventh son of pastoralist Henry Collins. He was a partner in his father's firm, Henry Collins and Co., then took over one of the company's properties, Mallett, near Terowie, for himself. He was a District Council of Terowie councillor for eleven years. In 1919, he moved to Burra, and subsequently served as mayor of the Corporate Town of Burra from 1922 to 1928. He was also involved in Burra community organisations, serving as president of the Burra Bowling Club and as a member of the Burra Hospital Board.

In 1928, he was elected to the Australian House of Representatives as the Country Party member for Wakefield, defeating long-serving Nationalist MP Richard Foster. However, he was defeated in the election of the following year by the Nationalist candidate Charles Hawker.

In 1932 he relocated to Adelaide and became a writer on agricultural topics, living "more or less in retirement". Collins died in 1945 after a "considerable time" of ill health.

Parliament of Australia
Preceded by Richard Foster	Member for Wakefield; 1928–1929	Succeeded by Charles Hawker
