= Albert Smith (South Australian politician) =

Australian politician (1881–1965)

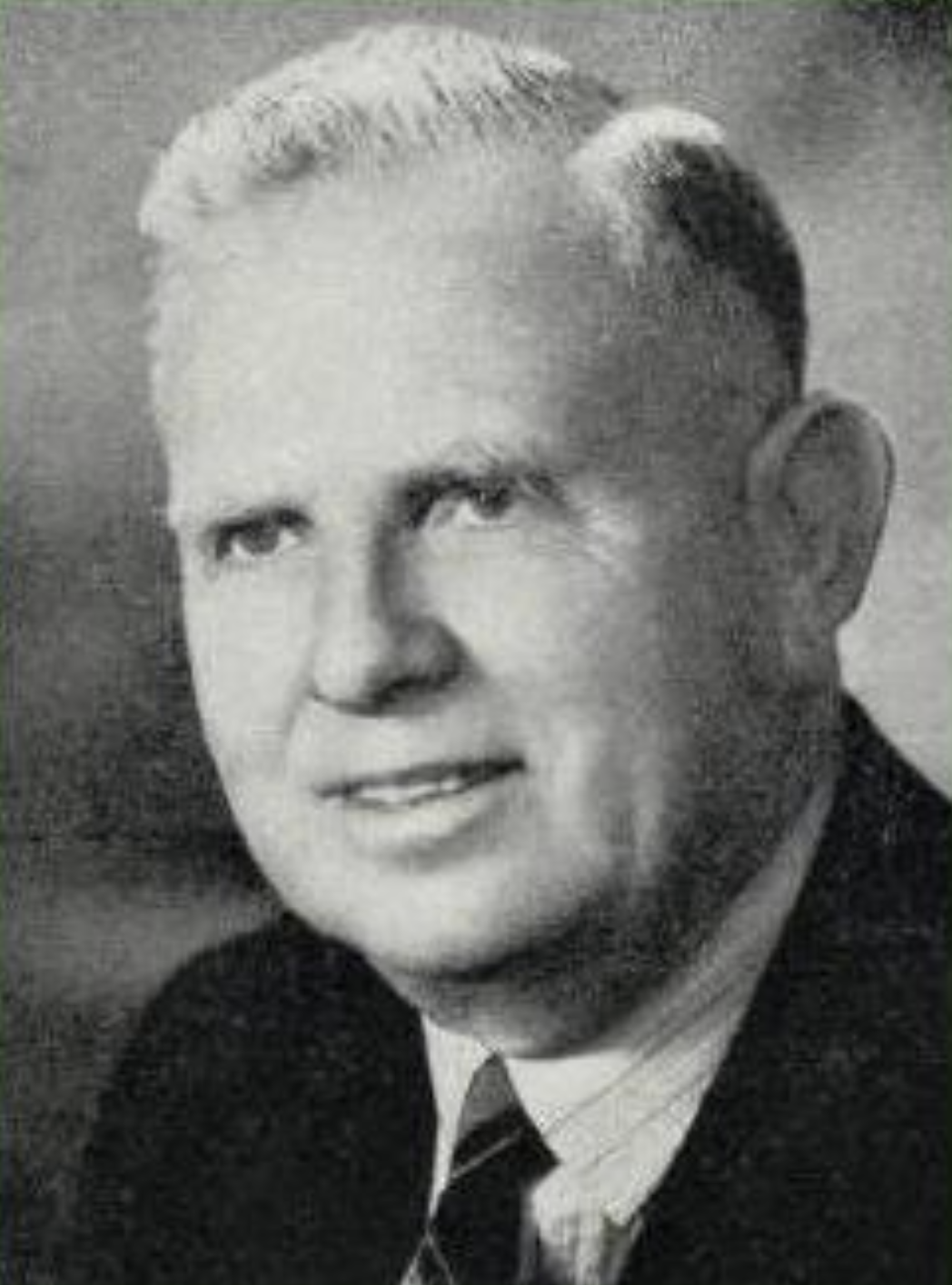

Member of the Australian Parliament for Wakefield
- In office 21 August 1943 – 28 September 1946
- Preceded by: Jack Duncan-Hughes
- Succeeded by: Philip McBride

Personal details
- Born: 2 January 1881 Kent, England
- Died: 5 February 1965 (aged 84)
- Party: Australian Labor Party
- Occupation: Service station proprietor

Albert Edward Smith (2 January 1881 – 5 February 1965) was an Australian politician. Born in Kent, England, he migrated to Australia as a child and was educated at Clare in South Australia. He became a service station proprietor and served on Clare Council. In 1943, he was elected to the Australian House of Representatives as the Labor member for Division of Wakefield, defeating the sitting United Australia Party member, Jack Duncan-Hughes. He held the seat until his defeat in 1946 by Philip McBride, the candidate for the UAP's successor, the Liberal Party. Smith died in 1965.

Parliament of Australia
Preceded by Jack Duncan-Hughes	Member for Wakefield; 1943–1946	Succeeded by Philip McBride
