= 1909 Wakefield by-election =

Australian federal by-election

- 28 August 1909

The Wakefield seat in the House of Representatives
- Registered: 30,782
- Turnout: 14,998 (48.7%)
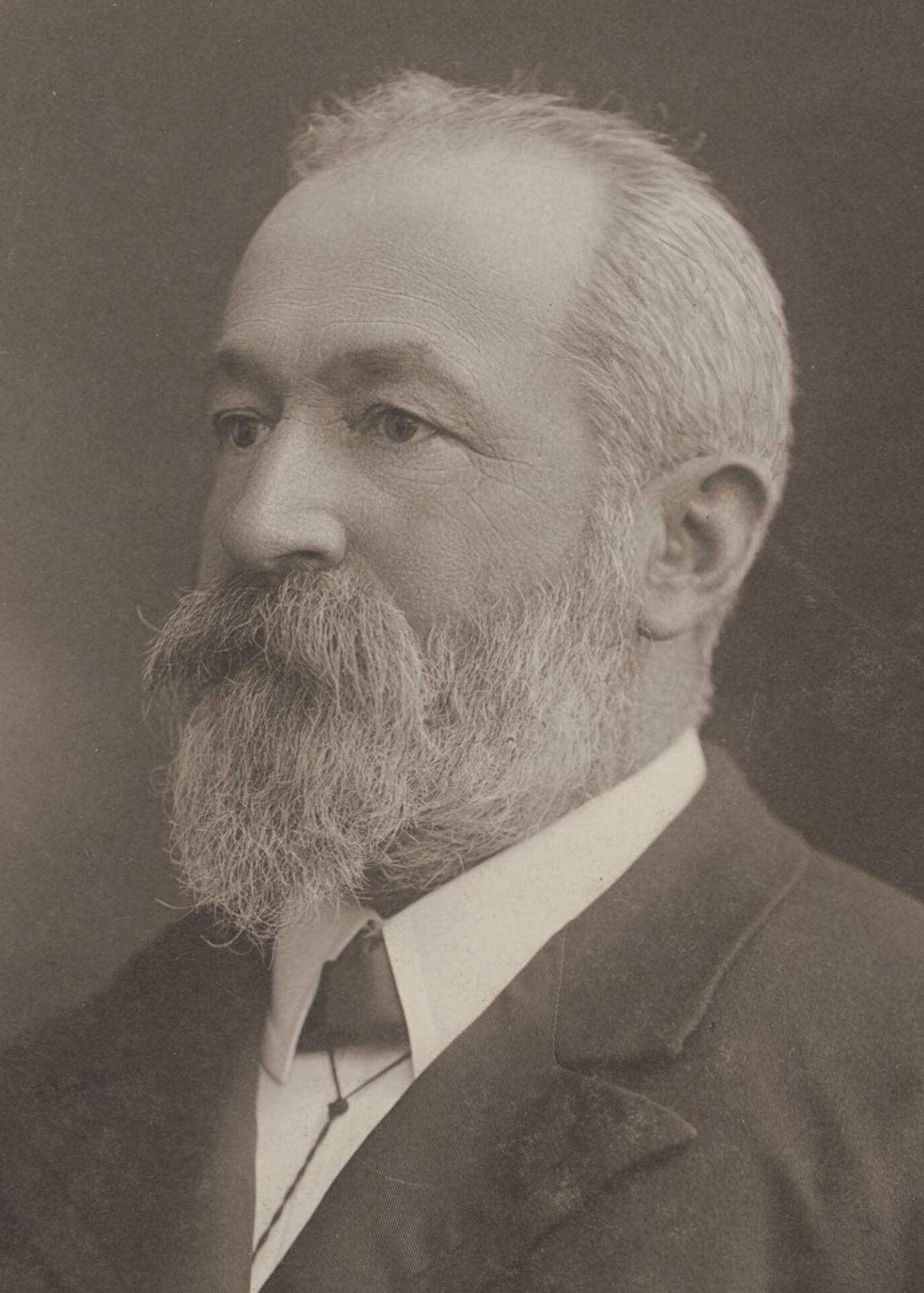

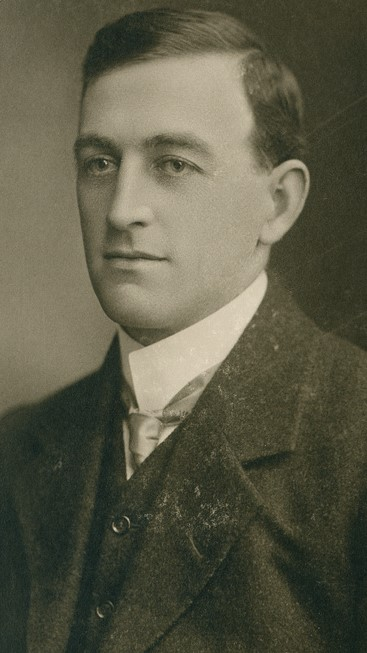
	First party	Second party
Candidate	Richard Foster	John Vaughan
Party	Liberal	Labour
Popular vote	8,120	6,789
Percentage	54.5%	45.5%
Swing	▲54.5	▲9.3
MP before election
Frederick Holder
Independent
Elected MP
Richard Foster
Commonwealth Liberal

A by-election was held for the Australian House of Representatives seat of Wakefield on 28 August 1909. This was triggered by the death of the Speaker of the House, Sir Frederick Holder.

The by-election was won by Liberal candidate Richard Foster.

== Results ==
1909 Wakefield by-election
Party	Candidate	Votes	%	±%
Liberal	Richard Foster	8,120	54.46	+54.46
Labour	John Vaughan	6,789	45.54	+9.35
Total formal votes		14,909	99.41	+0.75
Informal votes		89	0.59	−0.75
Registered electors		30,782		
Turnout		14,998	48.72	+7.01
Liberal gain from Independent				
