= Sydney McHugh =

Australian politician

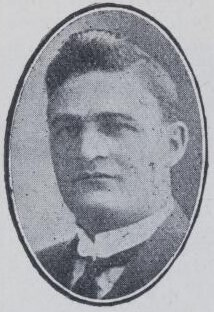

Member of the Australian Parliament for Wakefield
- In office 10 December 1938 – 21 September 1940
- Preceded by: Charles Hawker
- Succeeded by: Jack Duncan-Hughes

Personal details
- Born: 21 March 1892 Quorn, South Australia
- Died: 20 September 1952 (aged 60)
- Party: Labor Party
- Occupation: Farmer

Sydney McHugh (21 March 1892 – 20 September 1952) was an Australian politician. Born in Quorn, South Australia, he was educated at state schools before becoming a farmer and grazier. He served in the military from 1914 to 1918, during World War I. In 1924, he was elected to the South Australian House of Assembly as the Labor member for Burra Burra. He was defeated in 1927, but held the seat again from 1930 to 1933.

He transferred to the federal House of Representatives in 1938, winning a by-election for the seat of Wakefield caused by the death of the sitting United Australia Party member, Charles Hawker. McHugh faced long odds on paper. He needed a seemingly daunting 13 percent swing to win the seat, and his UAP opponent was former South Australian Premier Richard Layton Butler. However, on the third count, independent Percy Quirke's preferences flowed overwhelmingly to McHugh, allowing McHugh to take the seat on a shocking 20 percent swing. The seat's conservative nature reasserted itself in the 1940 election, when McHugh was defeated by UAP challenger Jack Duncan-Hughes, the former member for Boothby.

McHugh returned to state politics, winning the seat of Light in 1941 and holding it until 1944.

He died in 1952 (aged 60).

Parliament of Australia
Preceded by Charles Hawker	Member for Wakefield; 1938–1940	Succeeded by Jack Duncan-Hughes
