= Philip McBride =

Australian politician

The Right Honourable Sir Philip McBride KCMG
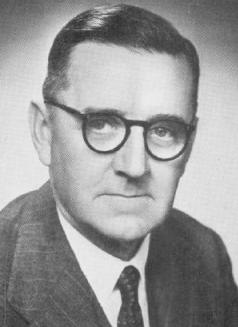

Minister for Defence
- In office 24 October 1950 – 10 December 1958
- Preceded by: Eric Harrison
- Succeeded by: Athol Townley

Member of the Australian Parliament for Grey
- In office 19 December 1931 – 21 September 1937
- Preceded by: Andrew Lacey
- Succeeded by: Oliver Badman

Senator for South Australia
- In office 21 October 1937 – 30 June 1944
- Preceded by: Oliver Badman

Member of the Australian Parliament for Wakefield
- In office 28 September 1946 – 14 October 1958
- Preceded by: Albert Smith
- Succeeded by: Bert Kelly

Personal details
- Born: 18 June 1892 Burra, South Australia
- Died: 14 July 1982 (aged 90) Medindie, South Australia
- Party: UAP (1931–44); Liberal (1944–58)

Sir Philip Albert Martin McBride, KCMG, PC (18 June 1892 – 14 July 1982) was an Australian politician. He was a United Australia Party member of the Australian House of Representatives for Grey from 1931 to 1937 and the Australian Senate from 1937 to 1944, and a Liberal Party of Australia member of the House of Representatives for Wakefield from 1946 to 1958. He served as a minister in both of Robert Menzies' governments, as Minister for the Army and Minister for Repatriation (1940), Minister for Supply and Development and Minister for Munitions (1940–1941), Minister for the Interior (1949–1950), and Minister for Defence (1950–1958).

== Early life and pastoralist career ==
McBride was born at Burra, in the mid north of South Australia, the son of an early settler and well known pastoralist James McBride and his wife Louisa (née Lane), and was educated first at Burra Public School and then Prince Alfred College in Adelaide. He worked on the family sheep stations with his father, then went into partnership with him in 1915, and in 1920 formed the family business into a well-known South Australian company, A. J. and P. A. McBride, Ltd., with Philip McBride as managing director. The company controlled a number of pastoral stations across South Australia, including Braemar Station, Faraway Hill Station, Lincoln Park Station, Mernowie Station, Teetulpa Station, Wilgena Station, Wooltana Station and Yardea Station of which Paney was part. In the early years he was very much a hands-on man, involved in day-to-day matters at the sheep stations. He would serve as chairman of A. J. and P. A. McBride for fifty years. He was president of the Stockowners' Association of South Australia from 1929 to 1931 and represented South Australia on the Australian Woolgrowers Council during the 1930s. McBride unsuccessfully contested the 1927 state election in the Flinders Ranges electorate of Newcastle and the 1930 state election in Burra.

== Federal politics ==
McBride was elected to the House of Representatives at the 1931 election, when he won Grey for the United Australia Party, defeating incumbent Labor MP Andrew Lacey. As a backbencher, he advocated for increased assistance to farmers and lower tariffs, and was concerned with the interests of the wheat and wool industries, given that he represented one of the largest electorates in Australia. He was easily re-elected in 1934.

Prior to the 1937 federal election, McBride made a deal with fellow grazier Senator A. O. Badman to swap seats and move to the Senate. The deal was not public at the time, because both men had contested the Senate preselection, which Badman had lost, and Badman's preselection win for Grey was reported by the media as having been unexpected. Badman resigned from the Senate and contested and won Grey at the federal election, while McBride, already endorsed for the Senate ticket at the 1937 election, the victors in which would not take their seats until July 1938, was appointed to Badman's Senate vacancy in the interim. The deal had also been unusual in that McBride and Badman caucused with separate federal parties. Although both were members of the same state party, the Liberal and Country League, Badman was a member of the UAP's federal coalition partner, the Country Party.

McBride was Assistant Minister for Commerce from April 1939 to September 1940, and resigned several directorships at the time of his promotion to avoid conflicts of interest. In the wake of the death of senior minister Geoffrey Street in the 1940 Canberra air disaster, McBride was assigned Street's portfolios of Minister for the Army and Minister for Repatriation. However, following the 1940 federal election in October, he was shifted to the role of Minister for Munitions and Minister for Supply and Development, the latter being a ministry that he had campaigned to create. He was a member of the War Cabinet from 1940 and the Advisory War Council from 1941. Following the UAP's defeat in parliament in 1941 and Labor leader John Curtin's accession as Prime Minister, McBride was made Deputy Leader of the Opposition in the Senate, but was defeated at the 1943 election, his term expiring in June 1944.

During his two years out of parliament, McBride was appointed chairman of Elder Smith and Company in 1944, and regained his directorship of Elder's Trustee and Executor Company and his position on the boards of the Adelaide Steamship Company and Wallaroo-Mt Lyell Fertilisers in 1945. He was involved in the creation of the Liberal Party of Australia to replace the failing UAP, and served on the provisional executive of the Liberal Party in 1944–45. He returned to parliament for the Liberal Party at the 1946 general election, winning the House of Representatives seat of Wakefield.

Following the election of the Menzies government in 1949, McBride became Minister for the Interior from 1949 to 1950, and again resigned his directorships. In 1950, he was appointed Minister for Defence, a position he retained until his retirement from politics in 1958. He was described as having been a "close confidant" to Menzies and "an influential member of [Menzies'] inner circle" and, when he retired, was the last of the "Old Guard" of ministers who had supported Menzies when he had lost the UAP leadership in 1941.

After retiring from parliament, McBride again served as chairman of Elder Smith and Co Ltd (later Elder Smith Goldsbrough Mort Ltd), was on the board of the Bank of Adelaide and Wallaroo-Mount Lyell Fertilisers Ltd, and was a member of the Australian Wool Board. He was also federal president of the Liberal Party from 1960 to 1965.

McBride died at his home at Medindie in 1982 and was cremated. He was survived by his wife and two of his sons.

His company, A. J. and P. A. McBride, Ltd. is still involved in the wool industry, and still owns many pastoral stations from when Sir Philip McBride ran the company.

His great-grandson is the independent South Australian state parliamentarian Nick McBride, who quit the Liberal Party in 2023.

== Honours ==
McBride was appointed a Knight Commander of the Order of St Michael and St George in 1953 and made a Privy counsellor in 1959.

== Notes ==
Political offices
Preceded by Geoffrey Street	Minister for the Army; 1940	Succeeded by Percy Spender
Preceded by Geoffrey Street	Minister for Repatriation; 1940	Succeeded by George McLeay
Preceded by Robert Menzies	Minister for Munitions; 1940–1941	Succeeded by Norman Makin
Preceded by Frederick Stewart	Minister for Supply and Development; 1940–1941	Succeeded by George McLeay
Preceded by Herbert Johnson	Minister for the Interior; 1950	Succeeded by Eric Harrison
Preceded by Eric Harrison	Minister for Defence; 1950–1958	Succeeded by Athol Townley
Preceded by Thomas White	Minister for Air; 1951	Succeeded by William McMahon
Preceded by Josiah Francis	Minister for the Navy; 1951	Succeeded by William McMahon
Parliament of Australia
Preceded by Andrew Lacey	Member for Grey; 1931–1937	Succeeded by Oliver Badman
Preceded by Albert Smith	Member for Wakefield; 1946–1958	Succeeded by Bert Kelly
Honorary titles
Preceded by Guy Arkins	Earliest serving living Senator; 1980–1982	Succeeded by Keith Wilson
