= David Fawcett =

Australian politician

The Honourable David Fawcett

Assistant Minister for Defence
- In office 26 August 2018 – 26 May 2019
- Prime Minister: Scott Morrison
- Preceded by: Michael McCormack (2016)
- Succeeded by: Alex Hawke

Senator for South Australia
- In office 1 July 2011 – 30 June 2025
- Succeeded by: Charlotte Walker

Member of the Australian Parliament for Wakefield
- In office 9 October 2004 – 24 November 2007
- Preceded by: Neil Andrew
- Succeeded by: Nick Champion

Personal details
- Born: 23 October 1963 (age 63) Narrabri, New South Wales, Australia
- Party: Liberal
- Education: University of New South Wales
- Occupation: Pilot & army officer
- Awards: Australian Defence Medal; Defence Long Service Medal (with clasp)
- Website: http://www.senatorfawcett.com.au/

Military service
- Allegiance: Commonwealth of Australia
- Branch/service: Australian Army
- Years of service: 1982–2004
- Rank: Lieutenant Colonel
- Unit: Australian Army Aviation

David Julian Fawcett (born 23 October 1963) is an Australian politician. He is a member of the Liberal Party and served as a Senator for South Australia from 2011 to 2025, having previously been a member of the House of Representatives from 2004 to 2007.

Fawcett was an Australian Army officer prior to entering politics, flying fixed-wing aircraft and helicopters in the Australian Army Aviation Corps and reaching the rank of lieutenant colonel. He was elected to the House of Representatives at the 2004 federal election, holding the seat of Wakefield for a single term prior to his defeat. Fawcett was elected to the Senate at the 2010 federal election and was re-elected on two further occasions prior to his defeat at the 2025 election. He served as Assistant Minister for Defence in the Morrison government from 2018 to 2019.

== Early life ==
Fawcett was born on 23 October 1963 in Narrabri, New South Wales. His family is originally from Kapunda, South Australia. He spent part of his childhood in Thailand where his father had been sent under the Colombo Plan. He returned to Australia in 1975 to attend Prince Alfred College in Adelaide.

== Military service ==
Fawcett graduated from the Royal Military College Duntroon with a Bachelor of Science in 1985. He joined the Australian Army Aviation Corps and qualified as a pilot, flying fixed-wing aircraft and helicopters. He qualified as a test pilot through the Empire Test Pilots' School in 1993 and was a senior flying instructor at the Oakey Army Aviation Centre, finishing his full-time military service in 2004. He was posted to Royal Australian Air Force Aircraft Research and Development Unit (ARDU) at Edinburgh, South Australia as an Army helicopter test pilot. He held a number of positions in ARDU and the Defence Acquisition Organisation, culminating in his final appointment as Commanding Officer, responsible for flight test programs for all of the Australian Defence Force aircraft. He reached the rank of Lieutenant Colonel before leaving the ADF to enter politics.

== Parliament ==
Prior to the 2004 election, the seat of Wakefield had been dramatically altered in a redistribution. The seat had long been a safe rural Liberal seat stretching from the Yorke Peninsula through to the Riverland and the state's border, but upon the abolition of the safe metropolitan Labor seat of Bonython, Wakefield was moved to take in the outer northern Adelaide suburb of Elizabeth and part of Salisbury, spanning through to the rural mid-north town of Clare—roughly a fifth the size of its former incarnation. The Liberals held the old Wakefield with a comfortably safe two-party margin of 14.6 points, but the new Wakefield was notionally a marginal Labor seat with a two-party margin of just 1.3 points. The previous Liberal member, Neil Andrew, believed this made Wakefield unwinnable and opted not to recontest the seat in 2004. However, Fawcett narrowly defeated the Labor candidate, ex-Bonython MP Martyn Evans, on a swing of 2.2 points, taking the seat on Family First preferences. Despite an extensive campaign at the 2007 election, Fawcett was defeated by Labor's Nick Champion, suffering a large swing of 7.2 points.

Fawcett was elected as a Liberal Senator in South Australia at the 2010 election and assumed his seat on 1 July 2011.

He served as deputy Government whip in 2014–2016, then from 2016 to 2022. Fawcett has served extensively in Parliamentary committees, chairing Foreign Affairs, Defence and Trade while in government, then as deputy chair while in opposition.

Fawcett is a member of the National Right faction of the Liberal Party, after previously being aligned with the Centre-Right faction during the Morrison government years.

Fawcett was placed third in the Liberal Party senate ticket for South Australia in the 2025 federal election. He was unsuccessful in his re-election, losing out to Labor's Charlotte Walker. His Senate term ended on 30 June 2025.

== Personal life ==
Fawcett is married with two children. He has been involved in leadership positions at Clovercrest Baptist Church in Modbury North, Adelaide and Tyndale Christian School in Salisbury East, Adelaide. He has been a contributing member of the Society of Experimental Test Pilots and the Australian Flight Test Society.

== Notes ==
Parliament of Australia
Preceded by Neil Andrew	Member for Wakefield; 2004–2007	Succeeded by Nick Champion
