= Richard Witty Foster =

Australian politician (1856–1932)

The Honourable Richard Foster
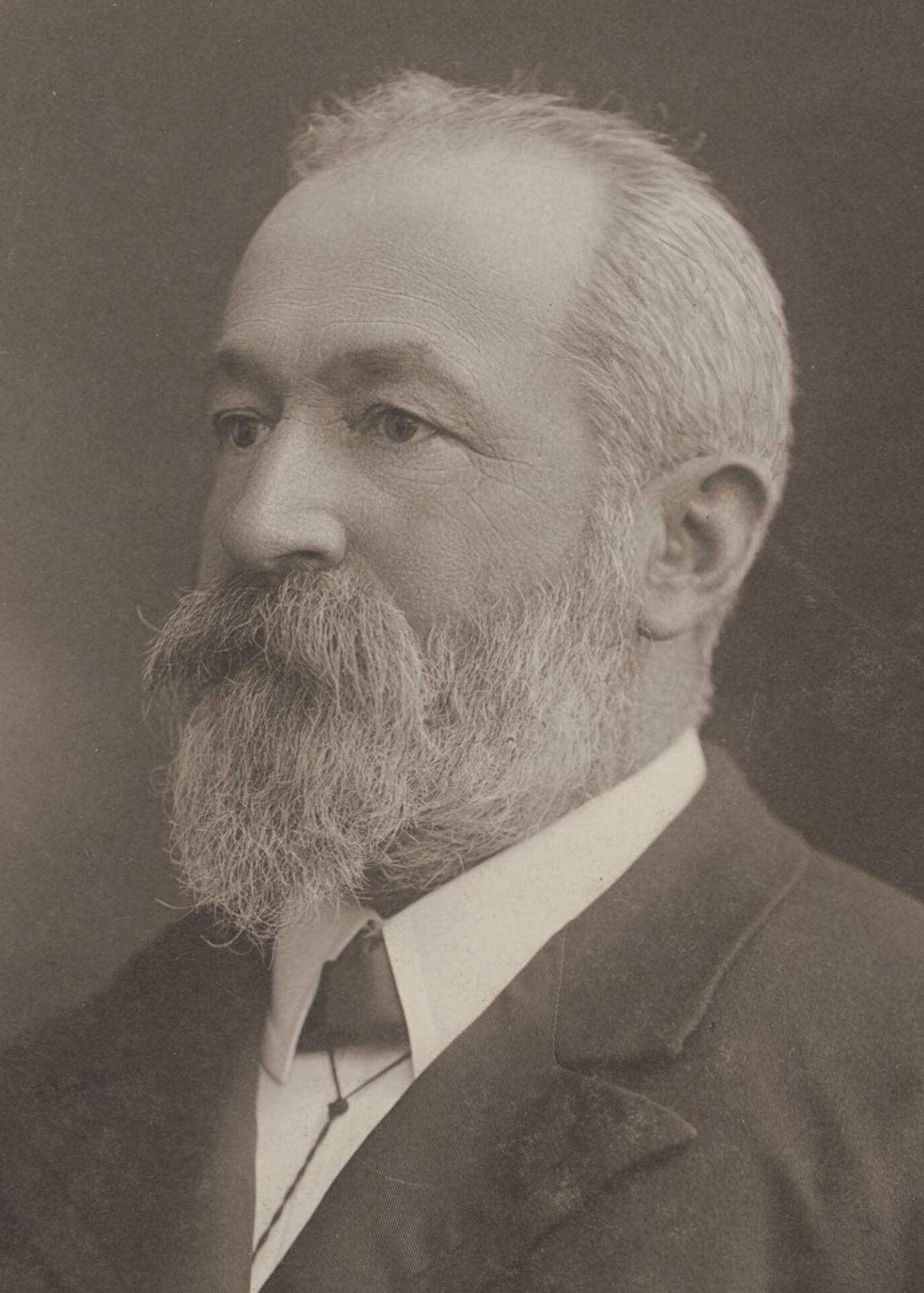

Minister for Works and Railways
- In office 21 December 1921 – 9 February 1923
- Prime Minister: Billy Hughes
- Preceded by: Littleton Groom
- Succeeded by: Percy Stewart

Member of the Australian Parliament for Wakefield
- In office 28 August 1909 – 17 November 1928
- Preceded by: Frederick Holder
- Succeeded by: Maurice Collins

Personal details
- Born: 20 August 1856 Goodmanham, Yorkshire, England
- Died: 5 January 1932 (aged 75) St Peters, South Australia
- Party: Liberal (1909–17); Nationalist (1917–28)
- Spouse: Elizabeth Lees
- Occupation: Grocer

Richard Witty Foster (20 August 1856 – 5 January 1932) was an Australian politician. He began his career in the Parliament of South Australia (1893–1906) and served two terms as Commissioner of Public Works in liberal and conservative governments. He was elected to federal parliament in 1909 as a Liberal, later joining the Nationalists. He was Minister for Works and Railways (1921–1923) under Prime Minister Billy Hughes, eventually losing his seat at the 1928 election.

== Early life ==
Foster was born in Goodmanham, Pocklington, Yorkshire, England and educated at Prospect House, Tockwith and apprenticed to a draper. He emigrated to South Australia in 1880 and established a business as a grocer and general provider at Quorn. He married Elizabeth Lees in September 1884. He was elected to the Corporate Town of Quorn council in 1887 and was mayor from 1890 to 1892.

== South Australian politics ==
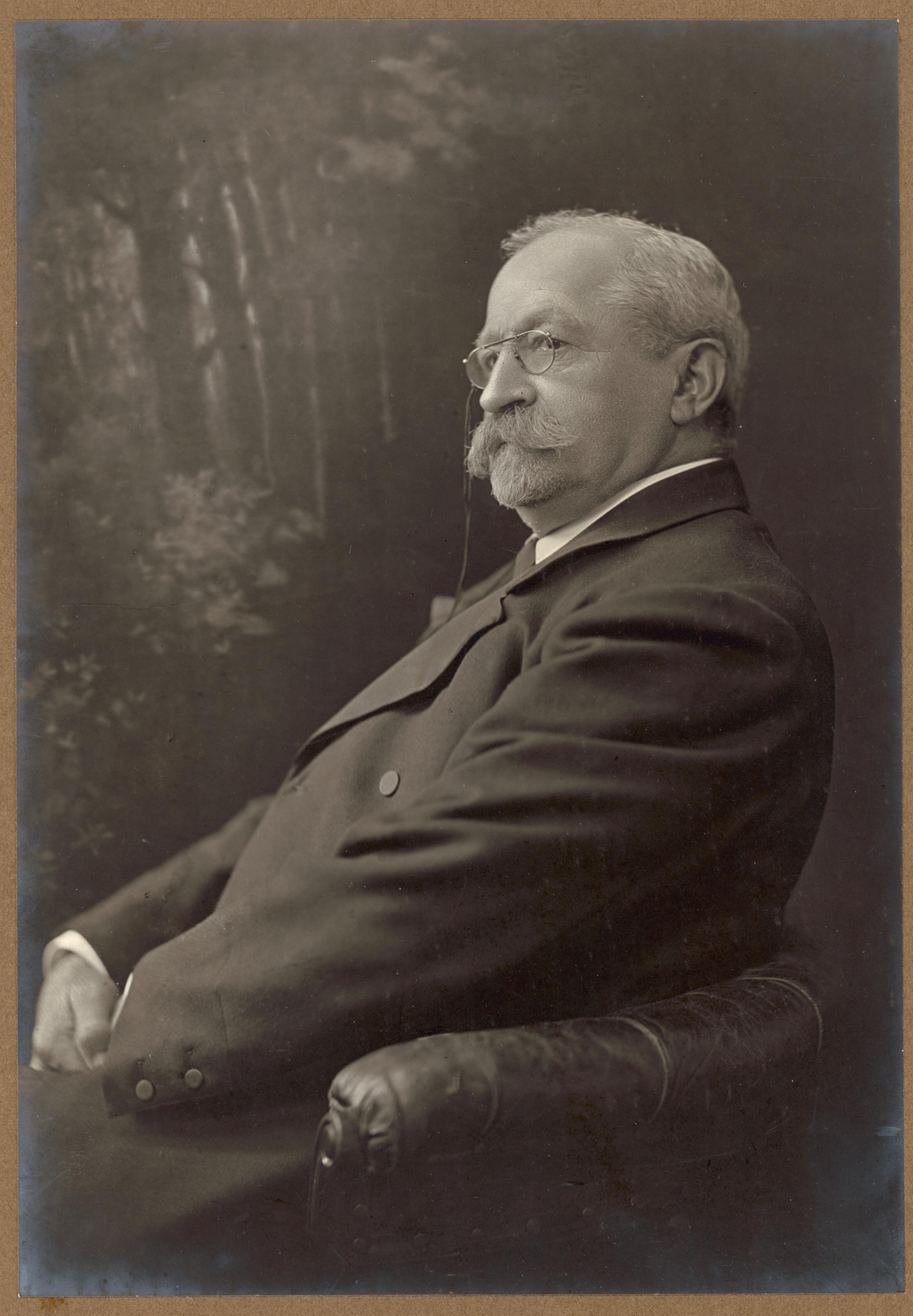
Studio portrait of Foster by W. Hammer & Co., Adelaide

On 19 April 1893, Foster was elected to the South Australian House of Assembly as the member for Newcastle, a seat he held until Newcastle was abolished on 2 May 1902. From 3 May 1902 until 2 November 1906, Foster represented Flinders. He was Commissioner for Public Works from 8 December 1899 to 4 July 1904 and Minister for Industry from 1902 to 1904 in the liberal governments of Frederick Holder and John Jenkins. He resigned from the ministry in 1904, but still supported Jenkins until it fell in 1905 and was then Commissioner for Public Works and Minister for Agriculture in the conservative administration of Richard Butler, but lost his seat in 1906.

== Federal politics ==
Foster won the seat of Wakefield in the House of Representatives at a 1909 by-election, standing for the Liberal Party. In December 1921, he was appointed Minister for Works and Railways in the Hughes ministry, but was dropped from the ministry in February 1923 by Stanley Bruce. He refused to join the South Australian Country Party and was beaten by its candidate, Maurice Collins in the 1928 elections.

Foster died in the Adelaide suburb of St Peters on 5 January 1932, survived by his wife, three daughters and a son.

== Notes ==
Civic offices
Preceded by John Lord	Mayor of Quorn; 1890–1892	Succeeded by John Rock
Parliament of South Australia
Preceded by Joseph Hancock	Member for Newcastle; 1893-1902; Served alongside: Thomas Burgoyne	Succeeded by Electorate abolished
Preceded by William Tennant Mortlock	Member for Flinders; 1902-1906; Served alongside: Thomas Burgoyne; David McKenzie	Succeeded by John Travers
Political offices
Preceded by Andrew Handyside	South Australian; Commissioner of Public Works; 1899 – 1904	Vacant Title next held by Richard Foster
Vacant Title last held by Richard Foster	South Australian; Commissioner of Public Works; 1905	Succeeded by Thomas Price
Parliament of Australia
Preceded by Frederick Holder	Member for Wakefield; 1909 – 1928	Succeeded by Maurice Collins
Political offices
Preceded by Littleton Groom	Minister for Works and Railways; 1921 – 1923	Succeeded by Percy Stewart
