= Neil Andrew =

Australian politician (1944–2026)

The Honourable Neil Andrew AO FTSE
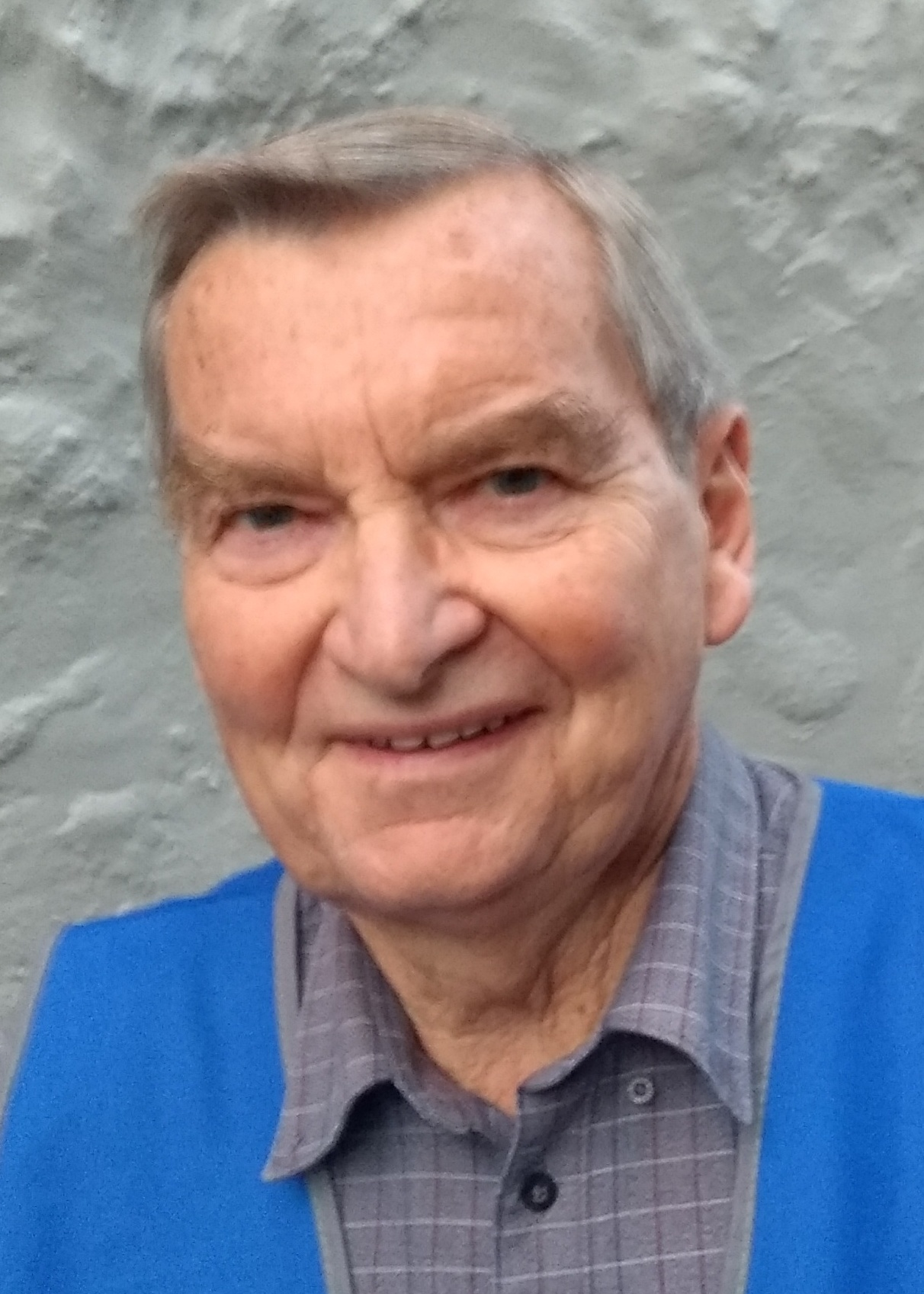
- Andrew volunteering for the Liberal Party at the 2019 federal election

24th Speaker of the Australian House of Representatives
- In office 10 November 1998 – 31 August 2004
- Preceded by: Ian Sinclair
- Succeeded by: David Hawker

Member of the Australian Parliament for Wakefield
- In office 5 March 1983 – 31 August 2004
- Preceded by: Geoffrey Giles
- Succeeded by: David Fawcett

Personal details
- Born: 7 June 1944 Waikerie, South Australia, Australia
- Died: 5 October 2026 (aged 82)
- Party: Liberal
- Relations: Nicola Centofanti (niece)
- Occupation: Horticulturalist

John Neil Andrew (7 June 1944 – 5 October 2026) was an Australian politician. He served in the House of Representatives for over 20 years from 1983 to 2004 representing the Division of Wakefield in South Australia for the Liberal Party. He became the 24th Speaker of the House of Representatives in 1998, a position he held until 2004.

== Early life ==
Andrew was born in Waikerie, South Australia on 7 June 1944. He was the son of Elsie and John Clover Andrew. His father was a farmer and served as chairman of the Waikerie District Council.

He attended Waikerie High School and Urrbrae Agricultural High School in Adelaide. After leaving school he returned to Waikerie where he farmed peaches, citrus and grapes. He was appointed to the South Australian Advisory Board of Agriculture in 1973 and served as chairman from 1980 to 1982. He also served on the Waikerie District Council from 1976 to 1983.

== Politics ==
Andrew joined the Liberal Party in 1967 and became chairman of its Waikerie branch in 1971.

In August 1982, Andrew defeated incumbent Liberal MP Geoffrey Giles for preselection in the federal seat of Wakefield. He retained the seat for the Liberal Party at the 1983 federal election and was re-elected on seven further occasions.

He served as a deputy opposition whip from 1985 to 1989 and from 1990 to 1993. He was a member of the speaker's panel from 1994 to 1997, then served as chief government whip in the Howard government from 1997 to 1998.

=== Speaker of the House ===
Andrew became Speaker of the House after the 1998 federal election. He presided over the House during the special sitting in May 2001 to mark the centenary of the Parliament of Australia, which met in the Victorian Legislative Assembly after meeting in the Royal Exhibition Building, Melbourne, as did the first Parliament in 1901. In 2003, he "named" Greens Senators Bob Brown and Kerry Nettle after they disrupted George W. Bush's speech to Parliament.

In the international sphere, Andrew did much to raise Australia's reputation as being a country which punched well above its weight, and could be relied upon to keep its word, once given. He participated in bilateral meetings wherever possible. For example, he held bilateral meetings with the Finno-Ugric group at Inter-Parliamentary Union (IPU) meetings in Chile in 2003 to explain Australia's participation in the intervention in the Middle East.

One of Neil Andrew's most significant parliamentary contributions was made in the advancement of parliamentary administration and reform, as was acknowledged in the citation for his recognition in the Order of Australia. Together with the then President of the Senate, he authorised the review into parliamentary administration by the Parliamentary and Public Service Commissioner Andrew Podger. Subsequently, Andrew sponsored measures to reform the Parliament's administration, conducting sensitive private and public briefings, and providing moral support in the maneuvering of reform proposals through the Australian Senate. His efforts resulted in the success of reforms which had been advocated on at least a dozen occasions, without success over the previous 90 years, starting with Prime Minister Fisher in 1910.

He represented a large swath of rural territory; most of which was to the north and east of Adelaide to the Victorian border, and extended west to the Yorke Peninsula. However, a redistribution ahead of the 2004 elections pushed his seat well to the south to take in heavily pro-Labor northern Adelaide suburbs that had previously been in the safe Labor seat of Bonython, which was being abolished. Meanwhile, most of his former rural territory was redistributed to neighbouring Grey and Barker. In 2001 Andrew held his old seat with a comfortably safe majority of 14 percent, but the reconfigured Wakefield had a Labor majority of just over one percent. Prior to the new boundaries being announced, Andrew notified Prime Minister John Howard in February 2004 that he would not renominate for Wakefield in the upcoming election. He was succeeded as Speaker by David Hawker on 16 November 2004.

== Personal life and death ==
In 1971, Andrew married schoolteacher Carolyn Ayles, with whom he had three children. His niece Nicola Centofanti was elected to the South Australian Legislative Council in 2020.

Andrew died on 5 October 2026, at the age of 82.

== Honours ==
Andrew was appointed an Officer of the Order of Australia (AO) in the 2008 Australia Day Honours list "for service to the Parliament of Australia through the advancement of parliamentary administration and reform, and to the community in the areas of agricultural research, development and education" particularly as Chair of the Crawford Fund in Australia.

He was elected a Fellow of the Australian Academy of Technological Sciences and Engineering (FTSE) in 2006.

Parliament of Australia
Preceded by Geoffrey Giles	Member for Wakefield; 1983–2004	Succeeded by David Fawcett
Preceded by Ian Sinclair	Speaker of the Australian House of Representatives; 1998–2004	Succeeded by David Hawker
