= Division of Wakefield =

Former Australian federal electoral division

Coordinates: 34.248°S 138.618°E

Wakefield Australian House of Representatives Division
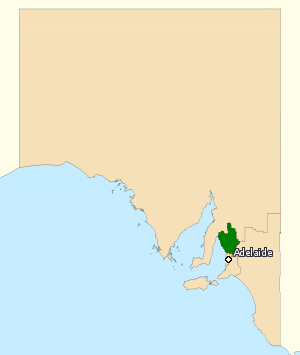
- Division of Wakefield in South Australia, as of the 2016 federal election
- Created: 1903
- Abolished: 2019
- Namesake: Edward Gibbon Wakefield
- Demographic: Rural

The Division of Wakefield was an Australian electoral division in the state of South Australia. The seat was a hybrid rural-urban electorate that stretched from Salisbury in the outer northern suburbs of Adelaide at the south of the seat right through to the Clare Valley at the north of the seat, 135 km from Adelaide. It included the suburbs of Elizabeth, Craigmore, Munno Para, and part of Salisbury, and the towns of Balaklava, Clare, Freeling, Gawler, Kapunda, Mallala, Riverton, Tarlee, Virginia, Williamstown, and part of Port Wakefield.

The division was named after Edward Gibbon Wakefield, who promoted colonisation as a tool for social engineering, plans which formed the basis for settlements in South Australia, Western Australia, New Zealand and Canada. The division was one of the seven established when the multi-member Division of South Australia was redistributed into single-member seats on 2 October 1903. At the 1903 federal election, the division (on very different boundaries) was won unopposed by the sitting speaker (following traditional Westminster convention), running as an independent. It was first contested by more than one candidate at the 1906 election. Two of the seat's former members of particular note have been the inaugural Speaker of the House and two-time Premier of South Australia, Frederick Holder, and Howard government two-term Speaker Neil Andrew.

Wakefield was abolished in 2019, following a redistribution triggered by a change in representation entitlement which saw South Australia's seats in the House of Representatives reduced to ten. The division has been mostly replaced by the Division of Spence.

== 1903 - 2004 ==
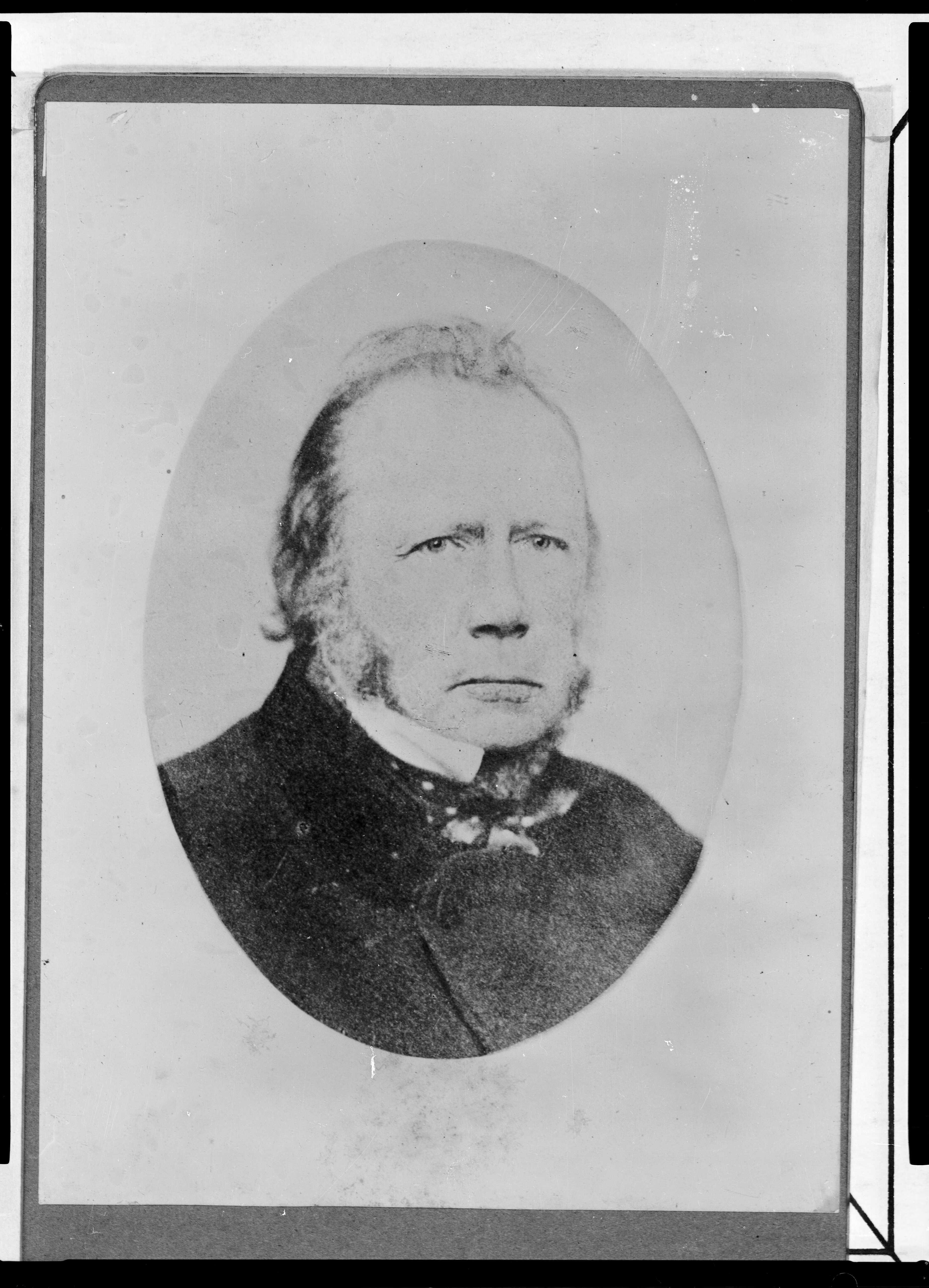
Edward Gibbon Wakefield, the division's namesake

For a hundred years, Wakefield covered large rural areas of South Australia and at times all the way to the borders of Northern Territory and Queensland, and was held by the Liberal Party and its predecessors for all but five years from 1903 to 2004. For most of that time, it was a safely conservative seat. Labor only succeeded in winning it twice, at a 1938 by-election and the 1943 federal election.

In its final configuration as an exclusively rural seat, it stretched from the Yorke Peninsula in the west to the New South Wales border in the east, and included much of the Riverland. It covered the towns of Angaston, Balaklava, Barmera Berri, Gawler, Gumeracha, Kadina, Kapunda, Loxton, Minlaton, Moonta, Morgan, Mount Pleasant, Nuriootpa, Renmark, Tanunda, Waikerie, Wallaroo and Yorketown.

== Final configurations 2004 - 2019 ==
The seat's character was dramatically altered by a redistribution prior to the 2004 election. Bonython, a comfortably safe Labor seat based on the outer northern suburbs of Adelaide, was abolished, and Wakefield was pushed well to the south to absorb much of Bonython's territory. In the process, Wakefield lost much of its vast rural territory, which went to Grey and Barker. This resulted in a seat covering only 6,407 km², roughly a fifth of its pre-2004 extent of 31,841 km².

Neil Andrew, the member for Wakefield since 1983, had been reelected to the old rural seat with a comfortably safe majority of 14.6 percent. However, due to the heavy Labor tilt of the northern Adelaide suburbs, the reconfigured hybrid urban-rural (though still classed rural) Wakefield became a marginal Labor seat with a notional 1.3 percent two-party margin. Andrew believed this made Wakefield impossible to hold and retired. However, David Fawcett retained it for the Liberals in 2004 with a 0.7 percent two-party margin, defeating the former member for Bonython, Martyn Evans.

At the 2007 election, Nick Champion became only the third Labor member ever to win Wakefield, with a 6.6 percent two-party margin. At the 2010 election, Champion made it a safe Labor seat on paper by winning a 12 percent two-party margin. He became the first Labor member to be re-elected to Wakefield, and the second to be elected for a full term. The South Australian federal redistribution in 2011 had the greatest impact on Wakefield where the Labor margin declined by 1.5 percent. Champion retained it at the 2013 election on a 3.4 percent two-party margin even as Labor lost government, marking the first time the non-Labor parties won government at an election without winning Wakefield. Champion increased his two-party margin at the 2016 election to 11 percent, again making Wakefield a safe Labor seat on paper.

Under the electoral redistribution completed in 2018 the adjoining Division of Port Adelaide was abolished, Wakefield was renamed Spence in honour of Catherine Helen Spence, and became a seat based on Adelaide's outer northern metropolitan local government councils of City of Playford, Town of Gawler and northern part of the City of Salisbury. The remaining non metropolitan rural portions were transferred to the Divisions of Grey and Barker. The newly named Division of Spence overlapped the final configuration of the former Division of Bonython before it was abolished prior to the 2004 election.

== Members ==
Image	Member	Party	Term	Notes
	Sir Frederick Holder (1850–1909)	Independent	16 December 1903 – 23 July 1909	Previously held the Division of South Australia. Served as Speaker during the Barton, Deakin, Watson, Reid and Fisher Governments. Died in office
	Richard Foster (1856–1932)	Liberal	28 August 1909 – 17 February 1917	Previously held the South Australian House of Assembly seat of Flinders. Served as minister under Hughes. Lost seat
	Richard Foster (1856–1932)	Nationalist	17 February 1917 – 1922	Previously held the South Australian House of Assembly seat of Flinders. Served as minister under Hughes. Lost seat
	Richard Foster (1856–1932)	Liberal Union	1922 – 1925	Previously held the South Australian House of Assembly seat of Flinders. Served as minister under Hughes. Lost seat
	Richard Foster (1856–1932)	Nationalist	1925 – 17 November 1928	Previously held the South Australian House of Assembly seat of Flinders. Served as minister under Hughes. Lost seat
	Maurice Collins (1878–1945)	Country	17 November 1928 – 12 October 1929	Lost seat
	Charles Hawker (1894–1938)	Nationalist	12 October 1929 – 7 May 1931	Served as minister under Lyons. Died in office
	Charles Hawker (1894–1938)	United Australia	7 May 1931 – 25 October 1938	Served as minister under Lyons. Died in office
	Sydney McHugh (1892–1952)	Labor	10 December 1938 – 21 September 1940	Previously held the South Australian House of Assembly seat of Burra Burra. Lost seat. Later elected to the South Australian House of Assembly seat of Light in 1941
	Jack Duncan-Hughes (1882–1962)	United Australia	21 September 1940 – 21 August 1943	Previously a member of the Senate. Lost seat
	Albert Smith (1881–1965)	Labor	21 August 1943 – 28 September 1946	Lost seat
	Sir Philip McBride (1892–1982)	Liberal	28 September 1946 – 14 October 1958	Previously a member of the Senate. Served as minister under Menzies. Retired
	Bert Kelly (1912–1997)	Liberal	22 November 1958 – 10 November 1977	Previously a member of the Senate. Served as minister under Holt, McEwen and Gorton. Lost preselection and retired
	Geoffrey Giles (1923–1990)	Liberal	10 December 1977 – 4 February 1983	Previously held the Division of Angas. Retired
	Neil Andrew (1944–2026)	Liberal	5 March 1983 – 31 August 2004	Served as Chief Government Whip in the House under Howard. Served as Speaker during the Howard Government. Retired
	David Fawcett (1963–)	Liberal	9 October 2004 – 24 November 2007	Lost seat. Later elected to the Senate in 2010
	Nick Champion (1972–)	Labor	24 November 2007 – 18 May 2019	Transferred to the Division of Spence after Wakefield was abolished in 2019

== Election results ==
2016 Australian federal election: Wakefield
Party	Candidate	Votes	%	±%
Labor	Nick Champion	38,197	39.82	−1.70
Liberal	Kathleen Bourne	25,299	26.37	−11.52
Xenophon	Richard Inwood	19,592	20.42	+20.42
Family First	Marilyn Phillips	5,396	5.62	−0.36
Greens	Craig Vanstone	4,102	4.28	−0.87
Independent	John Bolton	2,728	2.84	+2.84
Christian Democrats	Ralph Anderson	619	0.65	+0.65
Total formal votes		95,933	94.61	+0.30
Informal votes		5,470	5.39	−0.30
Turnout		101,403	90.34	−2.77
Two-party-preferred result
Labor	Nick Champion	58,494	60.97	+7.57
Liberal	Kathleen Bourne	37,439	39.03	−7.57
Labor hold		Swing	+7.57	

== See also ==
- 2016 Australian federal election
- Results of the Australian federal election, 2016 (South Australia)
