= Charles Hawker =

Australian politician (1894–1938)

The Honourable Charles Hawker
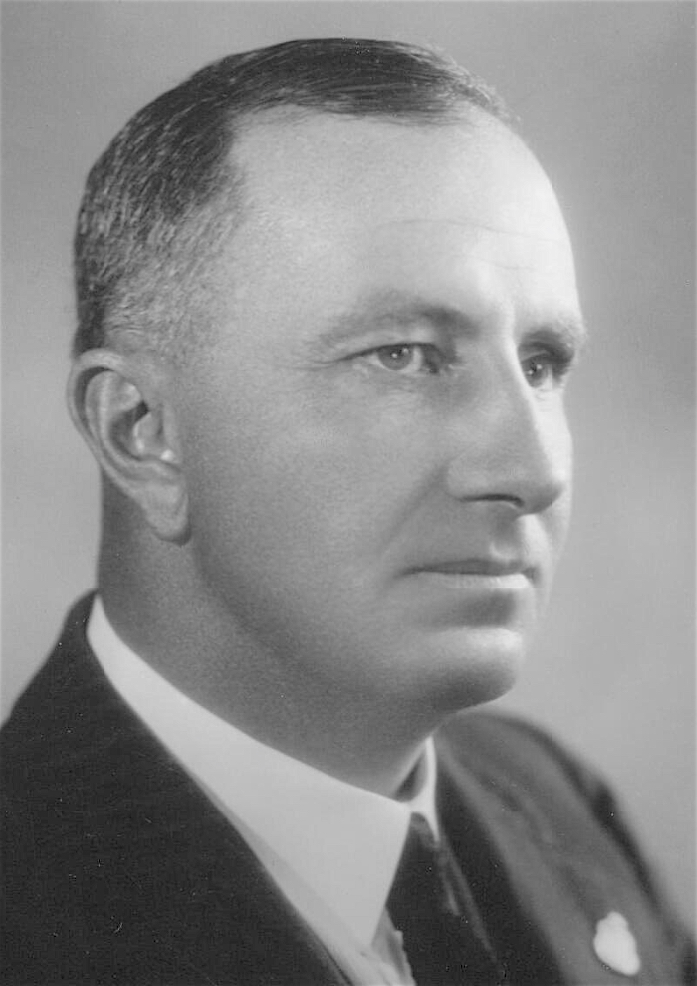

Minister for Commerce
- In office 13 April 1932 – 23 September 1932
- Prime Minister: Joseph Lyons
- Preceded by: Position created
- Succeeded by: Joseph Lyons

Minister for Markets
- In office 6 January 1932 – 13 April 1932
- Prime Minister: Joseph Lyons
- Preceded by: Parker Moloney
- Succeeded by: Position Abolished

Minister for Repatriation
- In office 6 January 1932 – 12 April 1932
- Prime Minister: Joseph Lyons
- Preceded by: John McNeill
- Succeeded by: Charles Marr

Member of the Australian Parliament for Wakefield
- In office 12 October 1929 – 25 October 1938
- Preceded by: Maurice Collins
- Succeeded by: Sydney McHugh

Personal details
- Born: 16 May 1894 Bungaree, South Australia
- Died: 25 October 1938 (aged 44) Mount Dandenong, Victoria
- Party: Nationalist (1929–31); UAP (1931–38)
- Education: Trinity College, Cambridge
- Occupation: Soldier

Charles Allan Seymour Hawker (16 May 1894 – 25 October 1938) was an Australian politician. He was a member of the Australian House of Representatives for Wakefield from 1929 until his accidental death in a plane crash in 1938, representing the Nationalist Party (1929–1931) and its successor the United Australia Party (1931–1938). He was Minister for Repatriation and Minister for Markets (later Commerce) in the Lyons government from 1931 to 1932.

== Early life and war service ==
Hawker was born at Bungaree homestead, near Clare, South Australia. He was the second son of Michael Seymour Hawker, manager of the Hawker family stations, and his wife Elizabeth Begg, née McFarlane, and grandson of George Charles Hawker. Hawker was educated at Geelong Grammar School, and Trinity College, Cambridge, earning Bachelor and Master of Arts degrees in 1919 and 1922, respectively.

While studying at Cambridge, he enlisted for service in World War I on 11 August 1914, and was commissioned as a temporary lieutenant in the 6th (Service) Battalion of the Somerset Light Infantry on 1 August 1915. He saw action on the Western Front in the Ypres salient, and was injured on 11 August and again in the Battle of Loos on 25 September, resulting in the loss of an eye. Despite his injuries, Hawker returned to the front with the rank of captain in May 1917. Hawker was severely wounded again on 4 October 1917 in the Battle of Broodseinde, and was paralysed from the waist down. However, after a series of operations and rehabilitation, he was able to walk with two sticks, although his legs remained in surgical irons for the rest of his life.

Hawker returned to South Australia in 1920, resumed his studies and became involved in family agricultural holdings. He became increasingly interested in trade as well as in political movements. Hawker joined the state council of the Returned Sailors' and Soldiers' Imperial League of Australia in 1921 and served as its vice-president. He was president of the Liberal Federation from 1927 to 1930, and was the South Australian member of the Commonwealth Board of Trade from 1928.

== Political career ==
In 1929 was elected as a member of the Australian House of Representatives, representing the electorate of Wakefield for the United Australia Party. He was appointed Minister for Markets and Minister for Repatriation in first ministry of Prime Minister Joseph Lyons and was the youngest member of the ministry. On 12 April 1932 he was replaced as Minister for Repatriation by Charles Marr and the Markets portfolio was renamed Commerce. On 23 September 1932, he resigned from the ministry in protest at its refusal to reduce parliamentary salaries in response to the Great Depression, having crossed the floor to vote as a minority in a controversial day in Parliament, and did not serve as a minister again, although he continued to represent the people of Wakefield as their elected representative.

Hawker travelled extensively, researching issues of trade and farming, and he published his research in pamphlets and treatises and gave lectures on issues of agriculture and pastoral work.

He was an enthusiastic book collector and added to a library of volumes inherited from his father.

== Death and legacy ==
Hawker died in the Kyeema airplane disaster at Mount Dandenong, Victoria in 1938. A memorial was established at St Michael's Anglican Church at Bungaree, South Australia. The Australian Electoral Division of Hawker and the Canberra suburb of Hawker, Australian Capital Territory are named in his honour, and the Charles Allan Seymour Hawker Scholarship was established by his sister Kathleen Lilias Needham in 1991 to fund Australian university education. His cousin, David Hawker, was Speaker of the Australian House of Representatives from 2004 to 2007.

Political offices
Preceded by Parker Moloney	Minister for Markets; Minister for Commerce; 1932	Succeeded by Joseph Lyons
Preceded by John McNeill	Minister for Repatriation; 1932	Succeeded by Charles Marr
Parliament of Australia
Preceded by Maurice Collins	Member for Wakefield; 1929–38	Succeeded by Sydney McHugh
