= Electoral results for the Division of Bonython =

Australian division election results

This is a list of electoral results for the Division of Bonython in Australian federal elections from the division's creation in 1955 until its abolition in 2004.

== Members ==
Member	Party	Term
Norman Makin	Labor	1955–1963
Martin Nicholls	Labor	1963–1977
Neal Blewett	Labor	1977–1994
Martyn Evans	Labor	1994–2004

== Election results ==
=== Elections in the 2000s ===
==== 2001 ====
2001 Australian federal election: Bonython
Party	Candidate	Votes	%	±%
Labor	Martyn Evans	35,813	47.36	−2.42
Liberal	Brenton Chomel	21,822	28.86	+3.81
Democrats	Mark Dennis	7,984	10.56	+1.26
One Nation	John Mahoney	4,825	6.38	−8.23
No GST	Rita Hunt	3,066	4.05	+4.05
Greens	Lisa Blake	2,102	2.78	+2.78
Total formal votes		75,612	92.67	−1.87
Informal votes		5,984	7.33	+1.87
Turnout		81,596	96.00	
Two-party-preferred result
Labor	Martyn Evans	45,688	60.42	−2.89
Liberal	Brenton Chomel	29,924	39.58	+2.89
Labor hold		Swing	−2.89	

=== Elections in the 1990s ===
==== 1998 ====
1998 Australian federal election: Bonython
Party	Candidate	Votes	%	±%
Labor	Martyn Evans	35,961	50.52	+0.93
Liberal	Phil Newton	17,253	24.24	−6.75
One Nation	Ted Shaw	10,542	14.81	+14.81
Democrats	Robert Fisher	6,539	9.19	−5.27
Australia First	Dave Carter	891	1.25	+1.25
Total formal votes		71,186	94.47	−0.69
Informal votes		4,170	5.53	+0.69
Turnout		73,356	95.69	−0.56
Two-party-preferred result
Labor	Martyn Evans	45,935	64.53	+5.07
Liberal	Phil Newton	25,251	35.47	−5.07
Labor hold		Swing	+5.07	

==== 1996 ====
1996 Australian federal election: Bonython
Party	Candidate	Votes	%	±%
Labor	Martyn Evans	34,926	49.59	−6.01
Liberal	Chris Bodinar	21,824	30.99	+2.30
Democrats	Chris Kennedy	10,185	14.46	+5.01
Greens	Maya O'Leary	2,141	3.04	+3.04
	Michael Brander	1,357	1.93	+1.93
Total formal votes		70,433	95.15	+0.40
Informal votes		3,588	4.85	−0.40
Turnout		74,021	96.25	+1.62
Two-party-preferred result
Labor	Martyn Evans	41,675	59.46	−5.29
Liberal	Chris Bodinar	28,414	40.54	+5.29
Labor hold		Swing	−5.29	

==== 1994 by-election ====
Bonython by-election, 1994
Party	Candidate	Votes	%	±%
Labor	Martyn Evans	29,097	45.92	−9.68
Liberal	Andy Markwell	20,398	32.19	+3.50
Grey Power	George Bell	4,659	7.35	+7.35
Against Further Immigration	Denis McCormack	4,323	6.82	+6.82
Democrats	Philip Newey	3,960	6.25	−3.20
Independent	Jack Webb	923	1.46	+1.46
Total formal votes		63,360	94.45	−0.01
Informal votes		3,722	5.55	+0.01
Turnout		67,082	86.59	−8.04
Two-party-preferred result
Labor	Martyn Evans	36,013	56.90	−7.85
Liberal	Andy Markwell	27,284	43.10	+7.85
Labor hold		Swing	−7.85	

==== 1993 ====
1993 Australian federal election: Bonython
Party	Candidate	Votes	%	±%
Labor	Neal Blewett	38,820	55.60	+3.52
Liberal	Ian Brookfield	20,032	28.69	+2.30
Democrats	Colin Maas	6,596	9.45	−8.80
Independent	Tony Rocca	1,994	2.86	+2.86
Call to Australia	Dennis Hood	1,099	1.57	−1.71
Natural Law	Eamon McAleer	667	0.96	+0.96
Independent	Bruce Hannaford	615	0.88	+0.88
Total formal votes		69,823	94.75	−0.21
Informal votes		3,870	5.25	+0.21
Turnout		73,693	94.63	
Two-party-preferred result
Labor	Neal Blewett	45,174	64.75	−0.92
Liberal	Ian Brookfield	24,598	35.25	+0.92
Labor hold		Swing	−0.92	

==== 1990 ====
1990 Australian federal election: Bonython
Party	Candidate	Votes	%	±%
Labor	Neal Blewett	36,326	52.1	−9.2
Liberal	Natalie Richardson	18,216	26.2	+1.9
Democrats	Colin Maas	12,782	18.3	+8.8
Call to Australia	Bruce Hannaford	2,334	3.4	+3.4
Total formal votes		69,658	95.0	
Informal votes		3,635	5.0	
Turnout		73,293	96.0	
Two-party-preferred result
Labor	Neal Blewett	45,837	65.9	−2.2
Liberal	Natalie Richardson	23,722	34.1	+2.2
Labor hold		Swing	−2.2	

=== Elections in the 1980s ===
==== 1987 ====
1987 Australian federal election: Bonython
Party	Candidate	Votes	%	±%
Labor	Neal Blewett	38,150	61.3	−2.7
Liberal	Bernhard Buechner	15,115	24.3	−2.3
Democrats	Colin Maas	5,887	9.5	+0.1
National	Cathryn Linedale	2,233	3.6	+3.6
Unite Australia	John Longhurst	825	1.3	+1.3
Total formal votes		62,210	91.6	
Informal votes		5,700	8.4	
Turnout		67,910	93.9	
Two-party-preferred result
Labor	Neal Blewett	42,338	68.1	−0.8
Liberal	Bernhard Buechner	19,862	31.9	+0.8
Labor hold		Swing	−0.8	

==== 1984 ====
1984 Australian federal election: Bonython
Party	Candidate	Votes	%	±%
Labor	Neal Blewett	35,817	64.0	−0.7
Liberal	Graham Sara	14,902	26.6	+0.1
Democrats	John Longhurst	5,279	9.4	+0.6
Total formal votes		55,998	88.1	
Informal votes		7,573	11.9	
Turnout		63,571	94.7	
Two-party-preferred result
Labor	Neal Blewett	38,578	68.9	−1.1
Liberal	Graham Sara	17,418	31.1	+1.1
Labor hold		Swing	−1.1	

==== 1983 ====
1983 Australian federal election: Bonython
Party	Candidate	Votes	%	±%
Labor	Neal Blewett	48,097	60.5	+6.1
Liberal	Neville Joyce	24,391	30.7	−2.0
Democrats	John Longhurst	7,006	8.8	−2.3
Total formal votes		79,494	97.1	
Informal votes		2,340	2.9	
Turnout		81,834	94.1	
Two-party-preferred result
Labor	Neal Blewett		65.8	+3.4
Liberal	Neville Joyce		34.2	−3.4
Labor hold		Swing	+3.4	

==== 1980 ====
1980 Australian federal election: Bonython
Party	Candidate	Votes	%	±%
Labor	Neal Blewett	40,825	54.4	+3.9
Liberal	Mark Mau	24,507	32.7	+1.9
Democrats	John Longhurst	8,288	11.1	−7.5
Socialist Labour	John Villain	716	1.0	+1.0
Progressive Conservative	Donald Keitel	656	0.9	+0.9
Total formal votes		74,992	96.7	
Informal votes		2,535	3.3	
Turnout		77,527	94.4	
Two-party-preferred result
Labor	Neal Blewett		62.4	+2.6
Liberal	Mark Mau		37.6	−2.6
Labor hold		Swing	+2.6	

=== Elections in the 1970s ===
==== 1977 ====
1977 Australian federal election: Bonython
Party	Candidate	Votes	%	±%
Labor	Neal Blewett	33,772	50.5	+2.1
Liberal	Brian Marsden	20,595	30.8	−8.9
Democrats	John Longhurst	12,457	18.6	+18.6
Total formal votes		66,824	96.0	
Informal votes		2,814	4.0	
Turnout		69,638	94.4	
Two-party-preferred result
Labor	Neal Blewett		59.8	+6.1
Liberal	Brian Marsden		40.2	−6.1
Labor hold		Swing	+6.1	

==== 1975 ====
1975 Australian federal election: Bonython
Party	Candidate	Votes	%	±%
Labor	Martin Nicholls	41,363	50.7	−9.7
Liberal	Alan Irving	30,568	37.4	+16.7
Liberal Movement	John Longhurst	5,605	6.9	−1.4
Communist	Robert Durbridge	4,099	5.0	+5.0
Total formal votes		81,635	96.8	
Informal votes		2,727	3.2	
Turnout		84,362	96.1	
Two-party-preferred result
Labor	Martin Nicholls		56.0	−9.6
Liberal	Alan Irving		44.0	+9.6
Labor hold		Swing	−9.6	

==== 1974 ====
1974 Australian federal election: Bonython
Party	Candidate	Votes	%	±%
Labor	Martin Nicholls	44,723	60.4	−1.3
Liberal	Rudolph Masopust	15,310	20.7	−10.0
Liberal Movement	Jan Staska	6,131	8.3	+8.3
Australia	Derek Ball	3,969	5.4	+5.4
Country	Alan Irving	3,900	5.3	+5.3
Total formal votes		74,033	96.8	
Informal votes		2,473	3.2	
Turnout		76,506	96.2	
Two-party-preferred result
Labor	Martin Nicholls		65.6	+1.5
Liberal	Rudolph Masopust		34.4	−1.5
Labor hold		Swing	+1.5	

==== 1972 ====
1972 Australian federal election: Bonython
Party	Candidate	Votes	%	±%
Labor	Martin Nicholls	37,752	61.7	−2.1
Liberal	Rudolph Masopust	18,777	30.7	+4.3
Independent	Frank Lawrence	2,894	4.7	+4.7
Democratic Labor	Peter Meredith	1,747	2.9	+0.9
Total formal votes		61,170	96.6	
Informal votes		2,168	3.4	
Turnout		63,338	94.6	
Two-party-preferred result
Labor	Martin Nicholls		64.1	−3.5
Liberal	Rudolph Masopust		35.9	+3.5
Labor hold		Swing	−3.5	

=== Elections in the 1960s ===
==== 1969 ====
1969 Australian federal election: Bonython
Party	Candidate	Votes	%	±%
Labor	Martin Nicholls	31,296	63.8	+17.0
Liberal	Rudolph Masopust	12,962	26.4	−17.6
Social Credit	Frank Lawrence	3,757	7.7	+2.1
Democratic Labor	Peter Meredith	1,004	2.0	−1.5
Total formal votes		49,019	96.5	
Informal votes		1,793	3.5	
Turnout		50,812	95.2	
Two-party-preferred result
Labor	Martin Nicholls		67.6	+17.1
Liberal	Rudolph Masopust		32.4	−17.1
Labor hold		Swing	+17.1	

==== 1966 ====
1966 Australian federal election: Bonython
Party	Candidate	Votes	%	±%
Labor	Martin Nicholls	40,133	49.5	−21.4
Liberal	John Kershaw	33,493	41.3	+41.3
Social Credit	Luke Horan	4,549	5.6	+5.6
Democratic Labor	Edward Timlin	2,856	3.5	−18.4
Total formal votes		81,031	96.1	
Informal votes		3,293	3.9	
Turnout		84,324	95.7	
Two-party-preferred result
Labor	Martin Nicholls		52.9	−24.5
Liberal	John Kershaw		47.1	+47.1
Labor hold		Swing	−24.5	

==== 1963 ====
1963 Australian federal election: Bonython
Party	Candidate	Votes	%	±%
Labor	Martin Nicholls	45,537	70.9	+7.7
Democratic Labor	Edward Timlin	14,084	21.9	+15.9
Communist	Alan Miller	4,638	7.2	+6.0
Total formal votes		64,259	94.7	
Informal votes		3,572	5.3	
Turnout		67,831	96.4	
Two-party-preferred result
Labor	Martin Nicholls		77.4	+9.7
Democratic Labor	Edward Timlin		22.6	+22.6
Labor hold		Swing	+9.7	

==== 1961 ====
1961 Australian federal election: Bonython
Party	Candidate	Votes	%	±%
Labor	Norman Makin	35,245	63.2	+1.9
Liberal	Margaret McLachlan	13,562	24.3	−4.1
Democratic Labor	Edward Timlin	3,331	6.0	+1.1
Independent	Thomas Ellis	2,938	5.3	+5.3
Communist	Alan Miller	695	1.2	−4.3
Total formal votes		55,771	95.4	
Informal votes		2,659	4.6	
Turnout		58,430	95.9	
Two-party-preferred result
Labor	Norman Makin		67.7	+1.4
Liberal	Margaret McLachlan		32.3	−1.4
Labor hold		Swing	+1.4	

=== Elections in the 1950s ===
==== 1958 ====
1958 Australian federal election: Bonython
Party	Candidate	Votes	%	±%
Labor	Norman Makin	27,598	61.3	−8.1
Liberal	Thomas Foale	12,781	28.4	−2.2
Communist	Joseph Buchanan	2,470	5.5	+5.5
Democratic Labor	Edward Timlin	2,206	5.5	+5.5
Total formal votes		45,055	95.8	
Informal votes		1,976	4.2	
Turnout		47,031	96.7	
Two-party-preferred result
Labor	Norman Makin		66.3	−3.1
Liberal	Thomas Foale		33.7	+3.1
Labor hold		Swing	−3.1	

==== 1955 ====
1955 Australian federal election: Bonython
Party	Candidate	Votes	%	±%
Labor	Norman Makin	24,350	69.4	+5.4
Liberal	John Mathwin	10,723	30.6	−5.1
Total formal votes		35,073	95.6	
Informal votes		1,616	4.4	
Turnout		36,689	95.6	
Labor notional hold		Swing	+5.4	
