= Electoral results for the district of Elizabeth (South Australia) =

South Australian district election results

This is a list of electoral results for the Electoral district of Elizabeth in South Australian state elections.

== Members for Elizabeth ==
First incarnation (1970–2006)
Member	Party	Term
John Clark	Labor	1970–1973
Peter Duncan	Labor	1973–1984
Martyn Evans	Independent	1984–1993
Martyn Evans	Labor	1993–1994
Lea Stevens	Labor	1994–2006
Second incarnation (2018–present)
Lee Odenwalder	Labor	2018–2026
Ella Shaw	Labor	2026-present

== Election results ==
=== Elections in the 2020s ===
==== 2026 ====
2026 South Australian state election: Elizabeth
Party	Candidate	Votes	%	±%
Labor	Ella Shaw	8,505	39.9	−14.8
One Nation	Kym Hanton	7,090	33.3	+22.9
Greens	David Deex	2,208	10.4	+2.5
Liberal	Dawid Jurczak	1,369	6.4	−13.0
Family First	Sanja Hendrick	887	4.2	−3.5
Legalise Cannabis	Matthew Field	729	3.4	+3.4
Australian Family	Brae McKee	197	0.9	+0.9
Fair Go	Angela Rojas	174	0.8	+0.8
United Voice	Marco Lorenzi	147	0.7	+0.7
Total formal votes		21,306	93.0	−3.2
Informal votes		1,602	7.0	+3.2
Turnout		22,908	80.9	−2.0
Two-candidate-preferred result
Labor	Ella Shaw	11,607	54.5	−16.0
One Nation	Kym Hanton	9,699	45.5	+45.5
Labor hold				

==== 2022 ====
2022 South Australian state election: Elizabeth
Party	Candidate	Votes	%	±%
Labor	Lee Odenwalder	12,086	54.7	+4.0
Liberal	Jake Fedczyszyn	4,281	19.4	+1.4
One Nation	John Lutman	2,290	10.4	+10.4
Greens	Tracey Smallwood	1,736	7.9	+1.2
Family First	John Bennett	1,705	7.7	+7.7
Total formal votes		22,098	96.2	
Informal votes		884	3.8	
Turnout		22,982	82.9	
Two-party-preferred result
Labor	Lee Odenwalder	15,590	70.5	+3.3
Liberal	Jake Fedczyszyn	6,508	29.5	−3.3
Labor hold		Swing	+3.3	

Distribution of preferences: Elizabeth
Party	Candidate	Votes	Round 1		Round 2		Round 3	
Party	Candidate	Votes	Dist.	Total	Dist.	Total	Dist.	Total
Quota (50% + 1)		11,050						
Labor	Lee Odenwalder	12,086	+338	12,424	+1,265	13,689	+1,901	15,590
Liberal	Jake Fedczyszyn	4,281	+521	4,802	+397	5,199	+1,309	6,508
One Nation	John Lutman	2,290	+448	2,738	+472	3,210	Excluded	
Greens	Tracey Smallwood	1,736	+398	2,134	Excluded			
Family First	John Bennett	1,705	Excluded					

=== Elections in the 2010s ===
==== 2018 ====
2018 South Australian state election: Elizabeth
Party	Candidate	Votes	%	±%
Labor	Lee Odenwalder	11,828	51.0	+1.1
SA-Best	Phil Gallasch	4,351	18.8	+18.8
Liberal	Sharka Byrne	4,083	17.6	−11.3
Greens	Wendy Morgan	1,570	6.8	−0.7
Conservatives	John Mathiesen	1,353	5.8	−5.2
Total formal votes		23,185	94.3	−1.5
Informal votes		1,401	5.7	+1.5
Turnout		24,586	86.6	+2.5
Two-party-preferred result
Labor	Lee Odenwalder	15,686	67.7	+6.6
Liberal	Sharka Byrne	7,499	32.3	−6.6
Two-candidate-preferred result
Labor	Lee Odenwalder	14,808	63.9	+2.9
SA-Best	Phil Gallasch	8,377	36.1	+36.1
Labor hold				

=== Elections in the 2000s ===
2002 South Australian state election: Elizabeth
Party	Candidate	Votes	%	±%
Labor	Lea Stevens	9,107	44.7	−1.4
Liberal	Ron Watts	7,111	34.9	+1.8
Family First	Peter Barnes	1,523	7.5	+7.5
Democrats	Anna Lukasiewicz	1,430	7.0	−12.2
SA First	Duncan MacMillan	624	3.1	+3.1
One Nation	Robert Fechner	580	2.8	+2.8
Total formal votes		20,375	96.7	
Informal votes		706	3.3	
Turnout		21,081	94.2	
Two-party-preferred result
Labor	Lea Stevens	11,649	57.2	−1.6
Liberal	Ron Watts	8,726	42.8	+1.6
Labor hold		Swing	−1.6	

=== Elections in the 1990s ===
1997 South Australian state election: Elizabeth
Party	Candidate	Votes	%	±%
Labor	Lea Stevens	10,282	51.8	+10.9
Liberal	Angus Bristow	5,703	28.7	−8.9
Democrats	Michael Pilling	3,857	19.4	+11.3
Total formal votes		19,842	95.8	−0.9
Informal votes		878	4.2	+0.9
Turnout		20,720	92.3	
Two-party-preferred result
Labor	Lea Stevens	12,764	64.3	+11.5
Liberal	Angus Bristow	7,078	35.7	−11.5
Labor hold		Swing	+11.5	

Elizabeth state by-election, 9 April 1994
Party	Candidate	Votes	%	±%
Labor	Lea Stevens	7,091	42.80	−4.21
Liberal	Stephen Nicholson	4,856	29.31	−0.89
Grey Power	Mary Bell	1,427	8.61	+8.61
Independent	Alfred Charles	993	5.99	−8.13
HEMP	Dave Sag	889	5.37	+5.37
Democrats	Roy Milne	731	4.41	−4.25
Independent Labor	Tony Eversham	502	3.03	+3.03
Independent^{[1]}	Bernhard Cotton	77	0.46	+0.46
Total formal votes		16,566	95.52	−0.91
Informal votes		777	4.48	+0.91
Turnout		17,343	88.11	−5.41
Two-party-preferred result
Labor	Lea Stevens	9,318	56.25	−1.34
Liberal	Stephen Nicholson	7,248	43.75	+1.34
Labor hold		Swing	−1.34	

^{1} Cotton ran under the banner "Independent - Parent Democracy in State Schools".

1993 South Australian state election: Elizabeth
Party	Candidate	Votes	%	±%
Labor	Martyn Evans	8,392	47.0	+6.2
Liberal	Stephen Nicholson	5,392	30.2	+8.0
Independent	Alfred Charles	2,521	14.1	+14.1
Democrats	Mark Basham	1,546	8.7	−0.9
Total formal votes		17,851	96.4	+0.3
Informal votes		661	3.6	−0.3
Turnout		18,512	93.5	
Two-party-preferred result
Labor	Martyn Evans	10,280	57.6	−8.2
Liberal	Stephen Nicholson	7,571	42.4	+8.2
Labor gain from Independent		Swing	N/A	

=== Elections in the 1980s ===
1989 South Australian state election: Elizabeth
Party	Candidate	Votes	%	±%
Independent	Martyn Evans	5,884	40.2	+4.0
Labor	Catherine Watkins	3,972	27.1	−15.9
Liberal	Peter Bates	3,106	21.2	+3.4
Democrats	Stephen Perkins	864	5.9	+2.9
Call to Australia	David Griffiths	430	2.9	+2.9
Independent	Arnold Ollivier	393	2.7	+2.7
Total formal votes		14,649	95.5	−0.6
Informal votes		688	4.5	+0.6
Turnout		15,337	94.1	−2.0
Two-party-preferred result
Labor	Catherine Watkins	10,109	69.0	−4.0
Liberal	Peter Bates	4,540	31.0	+4.0
Two-candidate-preferred result
Independent	Martyn Evans	9,823	67.1	+13.1
Labor	Catherine Watkins	4,826	32.9	−13.1
Independent hold		Swing	+13.1	

1985 South Australian state election: Elizabeth
Party	Candidate	Votes	%	±%
Labor	Sonia Argirov	6,508	43.0	−26.0
Independent Labor	Martyn Evans	5,500	36.2	+36.2
Liberal	Josephine Gapper	2,692	17.8	−2.2
Democrats	Carolyn Tan	452	3.0	−8.0
Total formal votes		15,152	96.1	
Informal votes		610	3.9	
Turnout		15,762	92.6	
Two-party-preferred result
Labor	Sonia Argirov	11,061	73.0	−1.0
Liberal	Josephine Gapper	4,091	27.0	+1.0
Two-candidate-preferred result
Independent Labor	Martyn Evans	8,179	54.0	+54.0
Labor	Sonia Argirov	6,973	46.0	−28.0
Independent Labor gain from Labor		Swing	+54.0	

Elizabeth state by-election, 1 December 1984
Party	Candidate	Votes	%	±%
Independent	Martyn Evans	7,376	43.9	+43.9
Labor	Raymond Roe	5,766	34.3	−30.0
Liberal	Josephine Gapper	2,601	15.5	−8.9
Democrats	Barbara Barlow	1,066	6.3	−5.1
Total formal votes		16,809	93.5	+1.9
Informal votes		1,158	6.5	−1.9
Turnout		17,967	86.1	−5.8
Two-candidate-preferred result
Independent	Martyn Evans	10,743	63.9	N/A
Labor	Raymond Roe	6,066	36.1	N/A
Independent gain from Labor		Swing	N/A	

1982 South Australian state election: Elizabeth
Party	Candidate	Votes	%	±%
Labor	Peter Duncan	10,896	64.3	+9.6
Liberal	Esmond McKeown	4,129	24.4	−8.4
Democrats	Barbara Barlow	1,927	11.4	−1.1
Total formal votes		16,952	91.6	−2.5
Informal votes		1,558	8.4	+2.5
Turnout		18,510	91.9	−0.3
Two-party-preferred result
Labor	Peter Duncan	11,860	70.0	+9.1
Liberal	Esmond McKeown	5,092	30.0	−9.1
Labor hold		Swing	+9.1	

=== Elections in the 1970s ===
1979 South Australian state election: Elizabeth
Party	Candidate	Votes	%	±%
Labor	Peter Duncan	8,809	54.7	−17.7
Liberal	Dick Pratt	5,284	32.8	+5.2
Democrats	Colin Nieass	2,021	12.5	+12.5
Total formal votes		16,114	94.1	−0.6
Informal votes		1,012	5.9	+0.6
Turnout		17,126	92.2	−0.2
Two-party-preferred result
Labor	Peter Duncan	9,820	60.9	−11.5
Liberal	Dick Pratt	6,294	39.1	+11.5
Labor hold		Swing	−11.5	

1977 South Australian state election: Elizabeth
Party	Candidate	Votes	%	±%
Labor	Peter Duncan	11,082	72.4	+8.4
Liberal	Anthony Hutton	4,235	27.6	+11.8
Total formal votes		15,317	94.7	
Informal votes		862	5.3	
Turnout		16,179	92.4	
Labor hold		Swing	+4.3	

1975 South Australian state election: Elizabeth
Party	Candidate	Votes	%	±%
Labor	Peter Duncan	11,619	68.2	+3.2
Liberal	Geoffrey Crome	3,022	17.7	−3.6
Liberal Movement	Shirley Liddiard	2,399	14.1	+14.1
Total formal votes		17,040	94.4	−1.7
Informal votes		1,013	5.6	+1.7
Turnout		18,053	92.1	+0.6
Two-party-preferred result
Labor	Peter Duncan	11,860	69.6	0.0
Liberal	Geoffrey Crome	5,180	30.4	0.0
Labor hold		Swing	0.0	

1973 South Australian state election: Elizabeth
Party	Candidate	Votes	%	±%
Labor	Peter Duncan	9,904	65.0	+1.3
Liberal and Country	Brian Marsden	3,247	21.3	−9.6
Independent	Fred Smith	1,617	10.6	+10.6
Independent	Nick Bolkus	476	3.1	+3.1
Total formal votes		15,244	96.1	−1.7
Informal votes		622	3.9	+1.7
Turnout		15,866	91.5	−0.2
Two-party-preferred result
Labor	Peter Duncan	10,610	69.6	+3.2
Liberal and Country	Brian Marsden	4,634	30.4	−3.2
Labor hold		Swing	+3.2	

1970 South Australian state election: Elizabeth
Party	Candidate	Votes	%	±%
Labor	John Clark	8,584	63.7	
Liberal and Country	Brian Marsden	4,160	30.9	
Social Credit	Thomas Keyes	736	5.5	
Total formal votes		13,480	97.8	
Informal votes		300	2.2	
Turnout		13,780	91.7	
Two-party-preferred result
Labor	John Clark	8,952	66.4	
Liberal and Country	Brian Marsden	4,528	33.6	
Labor hold		Swing		
