= Electoral results for the district of Little Para =

South Australian district election results

This is a list of electoral results for the Electoral district of Little Para in South Australian state elections.

== Members for Little Para ==
Member	Party	Term
Lea Stevens	Labor Party	2006–2010
Lee Odenwalder	Labor Party	2010–2018

== Election results ==
=== Elections in the 2010s ===
2014 South Australian state election: Little Para
Party	Candidate	Votes	%	±%
Labor	Lee Odenwalder	10,300	47.0	−4.2
Liberal	Damien Pilkington	7,201	32.9	+2.9
Family First	Lloyd Rowlands	1,997	9.1	−1.8
Greens	Samantha Blake	1,459	6.7	−0.3
Dignity for Disability	Scott Whelan	954	4.3	+4.3
Total formal votes		21,911	95.6	−0.9
Informal votes		997	4.4	+0.9
Turnout		22,908	89.9	−2.8
Two-party-preferred result
Labor	Lee Odenwalder	12,573	57.4	−3.9
Liberal	Damien Pilkington	9,338	42.6	+3.9
Labor hold		Swing	−3.9	

2010 South Australian state election: Little Para
Party	Candidate	Votes	%	±%
Labor	Lee Odenwalder	10,332	47.5	−8.4
Liberal	Franz Knoll	7,583	34.9	+10.4
Family First	David Somerville	2,205	10.1	+1.2
Greens	Paul Sharpe	1,612	7.4	+2.7
Total formal votes		21,732	96.3	
Informal votes		784	3.7	
Turnout		22,516	92.4	
Two-party-preferred result
Labor	Lee Odenwalder	12,313	56.7	−10.6
Liberal	Franz Knoll	9,419	43.3	+10.6
Labor hold		Swing	−10.6	

=== Elections in the 2000s ===
2006 South Australian state election: Little Para
Party	Candidate	Votes	%	±%
Labor	Lea Stevens	11,084	55.7	+11.0
Liberal	Ron Watts	4,956	24.9	−10.0
Family First	Tony Bates	1,759	8.8	+1.3
Greens	Sandy Montgomery	912	4.6	+4.6
Independent	Rita Hunt	710	3.6	+3.6
Democrats	Michael Pilling	486	2.4	−4.6
Total formal votes		19,907	95.8	
Informal votes		864	4.2	
Turnout		20,771	92.5	
Two-party-preferred result
Labor	Lea Stevens	13,285	66.7	+9.5
Liberal	Ron Watts	6,622	33.3	−9.5
Labor hold		Swing	+9.5	
