= 1994 Elizabeth state by-election =

South Australian by-election

A by-election was held for the South Australian House of Assembly seat of Elizabeth on 9 April 1994. This was triggered by the resignation of former state Labor MHA Martyn Evans, who moved to the federal seat of Bonython at the 1994 by-election. The seat, created at the 1969 redistribution and first contested at the 1970 state election, was held by Labor from 1970 until 1984, when Evans won it as an independent Labor candidate. In 1993, he rejoined the Labor Party.

== Timeline ==
Date	Event
18 February 1994	Martyn Evans resigned to contest the federal seat of Bonython at a by-election due on 19 March.
11 March 1994	Writs were issued by the Speaker of the House of Assembly to proceed with a by-election.
25 March 1994	Close of nominations and draw of ballot papers.
9 April 1994	Polling day, between the hours of 8am and 6pm.
22 April 1994	The writ was returned and the results formally declared.

== Results ==
The Labor opposition retained the seat despite a small two-party preferred swing.

Elizabeth state by-election, 9 April 1994
Party	Candidate	Votes	%	±%
Labor	Lea Stevens	7,091	42.80	−4.21
Liberal	Stephen Nicholson	4,856	29.31	−0.89
Grey Power	Mary Bell	1,427	8.61	+8.61
Independent	Alfred Charles	993	5.99	−8.13
HEMP	Dave Sag	889	5.37	+5.37
Democrats	Roy Milne	731	4.41	−4.25
Independent Labor	Tony Eversham	502	3.03	+3.03
Independent^{[1]}	Bernhard Cotton	77	0.46	+0.46
Total formal votes		16,566	95.52	−0.91
Informal votes		777	4.48	+0.91
Turnout		17,343	88.11	−5.41
Two-party-preferred result
Labor	Lea Stevens	9,318	56.25	−1.34
Liberal	Stephen Nicholson	7,248	43.75	+1.34
Labor hold		Swing	−1.34	

^{1} Cotton ran under the banner "Independent - Parent Democracy in State Schools".

== See also ==
- List of South Australian state by-elections
