= Michael L'Estrange =

Australian academic, public servant and diplomat

Professor Michael L'Estrange AO
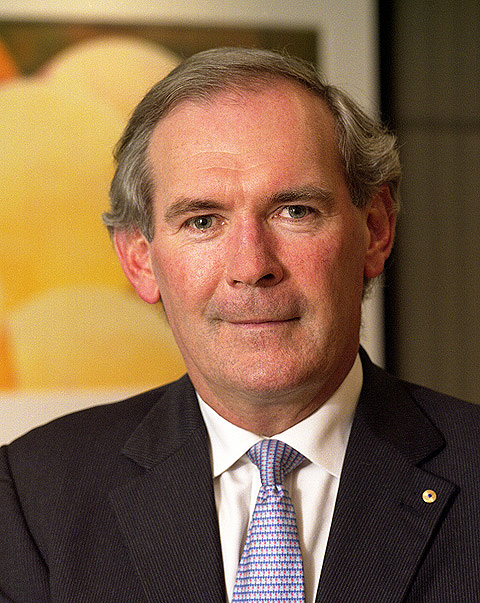

High Commissioner to the United Kingdom
- In office August 2000 – February 2005
- Preceded by: Philip Flood
- Succeeded by: Richard Alston

Personal details
- Born: Michael Gerard L'Estrange; 12 October 1952 (age 74) North Sydney, New South Wales
- Education: University of Sydney; Worcester College, Oxford; Georgetown University; University of California, Berkeley
- Occupation: Academic, public servant and diplomat

Michael Gerard L'Estrange AO (born 12 October 1952 in North Sydney, New South Wales) is an Australian academic and former public servant. He is the former Head of the National Security College at the Australian National University, in Canberra. L'Estrange had earlier served a long career in the Australian public service including as a diplomat and as Secretary of the Department of Foreign Affairs and Trade.

== Early life ==
L'Estrange attended St Aloysius' College in Sydney and then studied history at the University of Sydney residing at St John's College, and graduated in 1974. He went on to win a Rhodes Scholarship in 1975, studying Philosophy, Politics, and Economics at Worcester College, Oxford, graduating in 1979 with first class honours. While at Oxford, he played first-class cricket for Oxford University Cricket Club.

== Public service and politics ==
Returning to Australia, L'Estrange worked for the Department of the Prime Minister and Cabinet, focusing on foreign policy and also undertaking staff work with the Royal Commission on Australia's security and intelligence agencies. In 1987 he was awarded a Harkness Fellowship (he had applied for the Harkness in 1986, but that year it was awarded to Eleanor Hall) and attended the Edmund A. Walsh School of Foreign Service of Georgetown University, where the supervisor of his studies was Madeleine Albright. He also studied at the University of California, Berkeley. After this fellowship, he worked as a policy adviser to Australian Liberal Party leaders between 1989 and 1994, and became the executive director of the Menzies Research Centre, a conservative think tank, in 1995. In 1996, with the election of the Howard coalition government, L'Estrange was appointed as Secretary of Cabinet and the head of the Cabinet Policy Unit. L'Estrange and Howard had been neighbours in the 1970s.

From 2000 to 2005, he was the Australian High Commissioner to the United Kingdom, after which time he returned to become the Secretary of the Department of Foreign Affairs and Trade, between 2005 and 2009.

In December 2009 he was appointed as the inaugural Executive Director of the National Security College at the Australian National University. He stepped down from the role in November 2014 and was replaced by Professor Rory Medcalf.

== Private sector ==
On 29 May 2014, Rio Tinto announced that, as of 1 September 2014, he would join the Rio Tinto board as a non-executive director. On 7 April 2016, he was appointed to the Qantas board as a non-executive director. On 30 April 2017, he became the Deputy Chancellor of the University of Notre Dame Australia.

During L'Estrange's time as a director of Rio Tinto in May 2020 the mining company deliberately destroyed the Australian Aboriginal sacred site at Juukan Gorge - the only inland site in Australia to show signs of continuous human occupation for over 46,000 years. L’Estrange wrote an internal review of the decision to destroy the Juukan Gorge site, which was criticised by Australian Senator Pat Dodson as an “unsatisfactory piece of work” and by indigenous leader Noel Pearson as a "whitewash".

He subsequently announced that he would step down from the Rio Tinto board in 2021.

== Honours ==
In 2007, L'Estrange was appointed an Officer of the Order of Australia for service to the development and implementation of public policy in Australia, particularly national security and foreign policy, and to international relations through fostering diplomatic, trade and cultural interests including strengthening Australia's relationship with the United Kingdom.

Non-profit organization positions
Preceded by Inaugural Executive Director	Executive Director of Menzies Research Centre; 1995–1997	Succeeded by Hon Dr Marlene Goldsmith
Diplomatic posts
Preceded by Philip Flood	Australian High Commissioner to the United Kingdom; 2000–2005	Succeeded by Richard Alston
Government offices
Preceded by Ashton Calvert	Secretary of the Department of Foreign Affairs and Trade; 2005–2009	Succeeded by Dennis Richardson
