= Norman Makin =

Australian politician and diplomat (1889–1982)

The Honourable Norman Makin AO
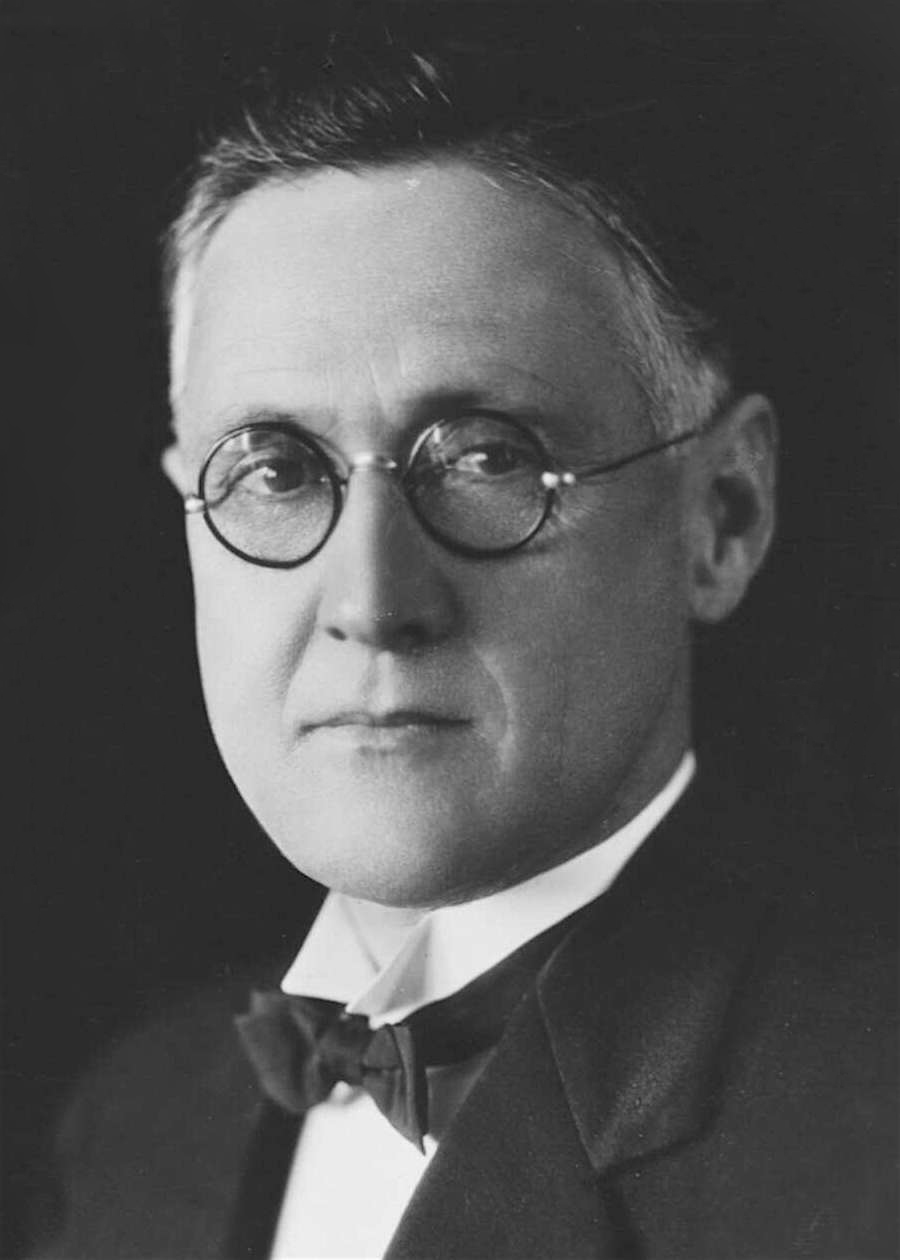

Australian Ambassador to the United States
- In office 5 September 1946 – 1 January 1951
- Preceded by: Frederic Eggleston
- Succeeded by: Percy Spender

Minister for Aircraft Production
- In office 2 February 1945 – 3 August 1946
- Prime Minister: John Curtin; Frank Forde; Ben Chifley
- Preceded by: Don Cameron
- Succeeded by: John Dedman

Minister for the Navy
- In office 7 October 1941 – 3 August 1946
- Prime Minister: John Curtin; Frank Forde; Ben Chifley
- Preceded by: Billy Hughes
- Succeeded by: Arthur Drakeford

Minister for Munitions
- In office 7 October 1941 – 3 August 1946
- Prime Minister: John Curtin; Frank Forde; Ben Chifley
- Preceded by: Philip McBride
- Succeeded by: John Dedman

Speaker of the Australian House of Representatives
- In office 20 November 1929 – 16 February 1932
- Preceded by: Sir Littleton Groom
- Succeeded by: George Mackay

Member of the Australian Parliament for Bonython
- In office 10 December 1955 – 1 November 1963
- Preceded by: New seat
- Succeeded by: Martin Nicholls

Member of the Australian Parliament for Sturt
- In office 29 May 1954 – 10 December 1955
- Preceded by: Keith Wilson
- Succeeded by: Keith Wilson

Member of the Australian Parliament for Hindmarsh
- In office 13 December 1919 – 14 August 1946
- Preceded by: William Archibald
- Succeeded by: Albert Thompson

Personal details
- Born: Norman John Oswald Makin; 31 March 1889 Petersham, New South Wales, Australia
- Died: 20 July 1982 (aged 93) Adelaide, South Australia, Australia
- Party: Labor
- Spouse: Ruby Jennings (m. 1912)
- Occupation: Metal worker

Norman John Oswald Makin AO (31 March 1889 – 20 July 1982) was an Australian politician and diplomat. He was a member of the Australian Labor Party (ALP) and served as Speaker of the House of Representatives (1929–1932), a cabinet minister during World War II, the inaugural President of the United Nations Security Council, and as Australian Ambassador to the United States (1946–1951).

Makin was born in Sydney to a working-class family and moved frequently during his youth, settling in South Australia in 1911. He trained as a patternmaker and was an officeholder in the Amalgamated Society of Engineers. Makin was an anti-conscriptionist during the 1916 ALP split and subsequently served as state president from 1918 to 1919. He was first elected to the House of Representatives at the 1919 federal election. During the Scullin government he served as Speaker of the House, the youngest holder of the office.

During World War II, Makin was a senior cabinet minister in the governments of John Curtin and Ben Chifley, serving as Minister for the Navy (1941–1946), Minister for Munitions (1941–1946), and Minister for Aircraft Production (1945–1946). He unsuccessfully sought the ALP leadership on two occasions. In 1946 Makin was chosen to lead the inaugural Australian delegation to the United Nations and subsequently became Australian ambassador to the United States. He returned to federal parliament at the 1954 election, eventually retiring at the 1963 election after spending 36 of the previous 44 years as an MP.

== Early life ==
Makin was born on 31 March 1889 in Petersham, New South Wales. He was the son of Elizabeth (née Yates) and John Hulme Makin, who had immigrated from Lancashire, England. At the time of his birth his father was a patternmaker at the Eveleigh Railway Workshops.

Makin's family moved to Melbourne in 1891 and to Broken Hill in 1898, where he attended Broken Hill Superior Public School. He left school at thirteen and became a parcel boy for Boan Bros drapers. He was a member of the Shop Assistants' Union at fourteen; he worked for two stationers and newsagents, sold the Barrier Miner in the streets of Broken Hill, and was chief assistant at the C Day & Co bookstore at eighteen. He was largely self-educated and became a keen reader, and was involved in local debating and literary societies. In 1909, while still a shop assistant, he was a witness for the defence at the conspiracy trial of trade unionist Tom Mann. At eighteen, Makin undertook an apprenticeship in pattern-making and engineering, and was employed in various mines; he joined the Amalgamated Society of Engineers.

He moved to Adelaide in 1911, and married Ruby Florence Jennings on 10 August 1912. He worked in a Kapunda foundry, and for James Martin & Company at Gawler. He had difficulty finding work at times due to his political activities, and returned to Broken Hill for a period, but returned to Adelaide in 1914 to work at Gray Bros. at Port Adelaide, and then in the Islington Railway Workshops. Having been involved in the labour movement from an early age, Makin was president of the North Adelaide district branch of the Amalgamated Society of Engineers in 1914 and secretary of its political committee in 1917. He was an unsuccessful Labor candidate for Barossa at the 1915 state election, reportedly riding over 2000 miles during the campaign, and again for Wakefield at the 1917 federal election. He publicly campaigned against conscription during World War I, and was president of the South Australian branch of the Labor Party from 1918 to 1919, in the aftermath of the 1916 Labor split over the issue. In 1918, he published a book on the progress of the labour movement in South Australia entitled A Progressive Democracy.

Makin was a lifelong Methodist, and in 1977 received a certificate from the church commending him on having been a lay preacher for seventy years.

== Early political career ==
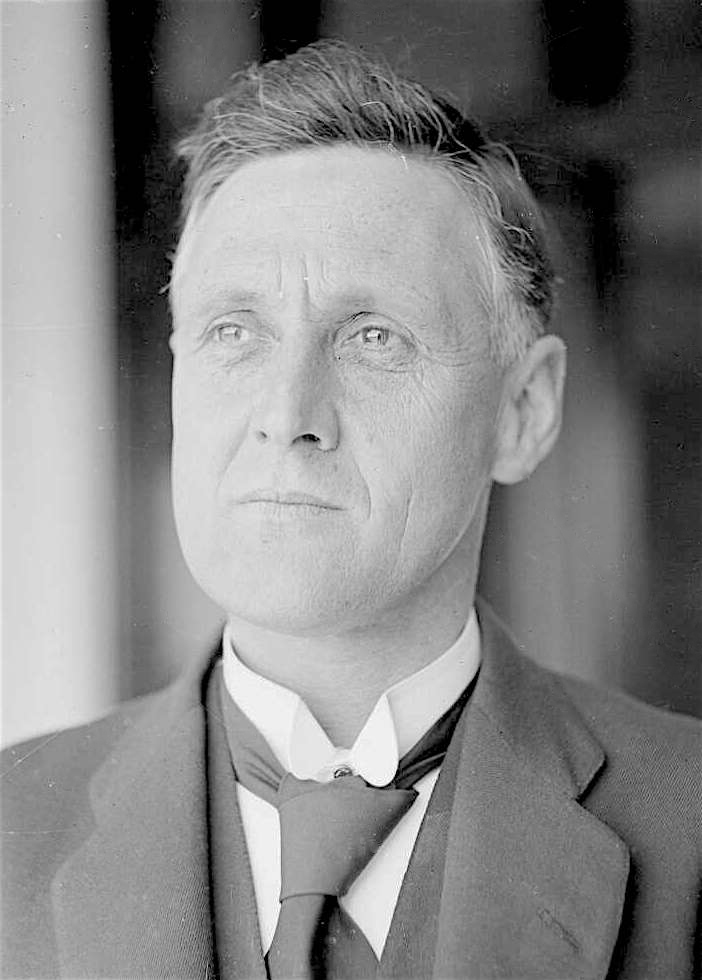
Makin in 1930, as Speaker of the House of Representatives

Makin was elected to the House of Representatives for Hindmarsh at the 1919 federal election, defeating Nationalist MP and 1916 Labor defector William Archibald in an acrimonious campaign. He was re-elected without difficulty in 1922, 1925 and 1928, reverting Hindmarsh to its traditional status as a safe Labor seat. He spent ten years in Opposition before the election of the Scullin Labor government in 1929. While in opposition, he served as secretary to the Labor caucus and had been touted in 1925 as a potential successor to John Gunn as state Labor leader and Premier of South Australia.

Upon the election of the Scullin government, Makin was elected Speaker of the House of Representatives, defeating four candidates in the Labor selection vote. As with his Labor predecessor Charles McDonald, he declined the ceremonial wig and gown. He was described as having been a "well-respected" Speaker, and was commended for his "dignity and impartiality" as Speaker as the 1931 Labor split unfolded. Following the defeat of the Scullin government in 1931 amidst the split, Makin was an outspoken loyalist of official Labor, alleging that he had been subject to an attempt to bribe him to leave the party, condemning both the pro-Premiers' Plan and Lang Labor defectors, and repeatedly clashing with Premier Lionel Hill. His staunch opposition to the Premiers' Plan led to him being rumoured as a potential challenger to Scullin for the federal Labor leadership, although he denied interest and no challenge eventuated. At the 1931 federal election, Makin was the only Labor member elected from South Australia, winning enough primary votes to retain Hindmarsh outright.

During his second stint in opposition in the 1930s, he was again secretary of the Labor caucus, and served as federal president of the Labor Party from 1936 to 1938. He stood for leader of the Labor Party in 1935, following Scullin's resignation, but received only two votes. He shifted his vote to John Curtin on the second ballot, allowing him to win by a single vote over Frank Forde.

Makin was one of the three Labor members on the Advisory War Council from October 1940. By 1941, when Labor returned to power under John Curtin, of who Makin was a close supporter, Makin had an undeniable claim to office, and became Minister for the Navy and Minister for Munitions, responsible for the Department of Munitions which oversaw the Small Arms Ammunition Factories around the country. These were key posts in a wartime government. In 1945 he also became Minister for Aircraft Production. He established good relations with service chiefs and played an important role in Australia's successful transition to a wartime economy, and later advocated for munitions factories to be retained in government control and adapted to civilian use to boost post-war manufacturing.

When Curtin died in 1945, Makin contested the leadership ballot along with Ben Chifley and caretaker Prime Minister Frank Forde. He was unsuccessful, winning only seven votes out of 70 caucus members.

== Diplomat ==
Makin had sought a diplomatic post as early as 1944 and had been in consideration for the positions of High Commissioner to Canada and High Commissioner to the United Kingdom, but he had been convinced by Curtin that he could not be spared. He was Acting Minister for External Affairs for four months during the absence overseas of Herbert Evatt until January 1946 while negotiations for the Australian–Thai Peace Treaty took place and Australia re-established a Commissioner in Singapore. In January 1946, he was selected by Chifley to lead the Australian delegation to the first General Assembly of the United Nations, having previously represented Australia at the London conference in early 1945. The government had initially planned to send only an official delegation to the United Nations, but made a late decision to send Makin after significant criticism that the lack of ministerial presence was inadequate for the importance of the event. The selection of Makin was nonetheless criticised by the opposition and some media due to a perception that he lacked experience in external affairs and did not have the stature of a figure such as Evatt.

On 14 January 1946, the day Makin arrived in London, Australia won a non-permanent seat on the United Nations Security Council; as the provisional rules appointed the body's president by rotation among members in alphabetical order, Makin became the first President of the United Nations Security Council from 17 January to 16 February that year and presided over its first meeting. He described it as "the most impressive day of my life". His presidency included responses to the Iran crisis of 1946, the Indonesian National Revolution and the presence of British troops in Greece, and the appointment of the first Secretary-General. Canadian journalist Ross Munro, in comments widely reported in the Australian press, sharply criticised Makin's tenure as President of the Security Council, claiming that he was insufficiently strong or decisive, that Makin seemed "uncertain about procedural matters" and was hesitant in applying and interpreting the United Nations Charter; Munro quoted one delegate who had commented that Makin "seemed overawed", and other correspondents that he "was too anxious to please". The Sydney Morning Herald reported that Makin's chairmanship had been "scathingly criticised in the lobbies" in England, while The Daily Mirror defended Makin, stating that he had "conducted proceedings with scrupulous fairness, great care, obvious sincerity and no small degree of skill", and deriding what they labelled a "campaign to belittle and disparage" him. He again served as President of the Security Council when the presidency returned to Australia in January 1947.

In June 1946, Chifley announced that Makin would be appointed as Australian Ambassador to the United States, a decision that had been expected since December 1945, while also elevating the position in rank from resident minister. He arrived in Washington DC, and presented his credentials in September. He retained his Cabinet posts until the 1946 election, reportedly because Chifley was unsure whether his desired successor would replace Makin. The United States ambassadorship was a position of great importance in the gathering Cold War atmosphere of the post-war years, atop a rapidly-expanding Australian presence in Washington. The teetotal Makin found the cocktail party circuit "arduous", and although he acknowledged the opportunities for more informal diplomacy, resented the limitations of the demanding social calendar on his home life. His practice of drinking only orange juice at such events was described as "almost unique among high-living diplomats". In 1947, he was involved in canvassing support in the United Nations for the United Nations Partition Plan for Palestine, and signed the papers bringing Australia into the International Monetary Fund. He remained in the post after Labor lost government to Robert Menzies in 1949, and served until 1951. His last official act as ambassador was to read the opening prayers for the United States Senate.

== Return to politics and later life ==
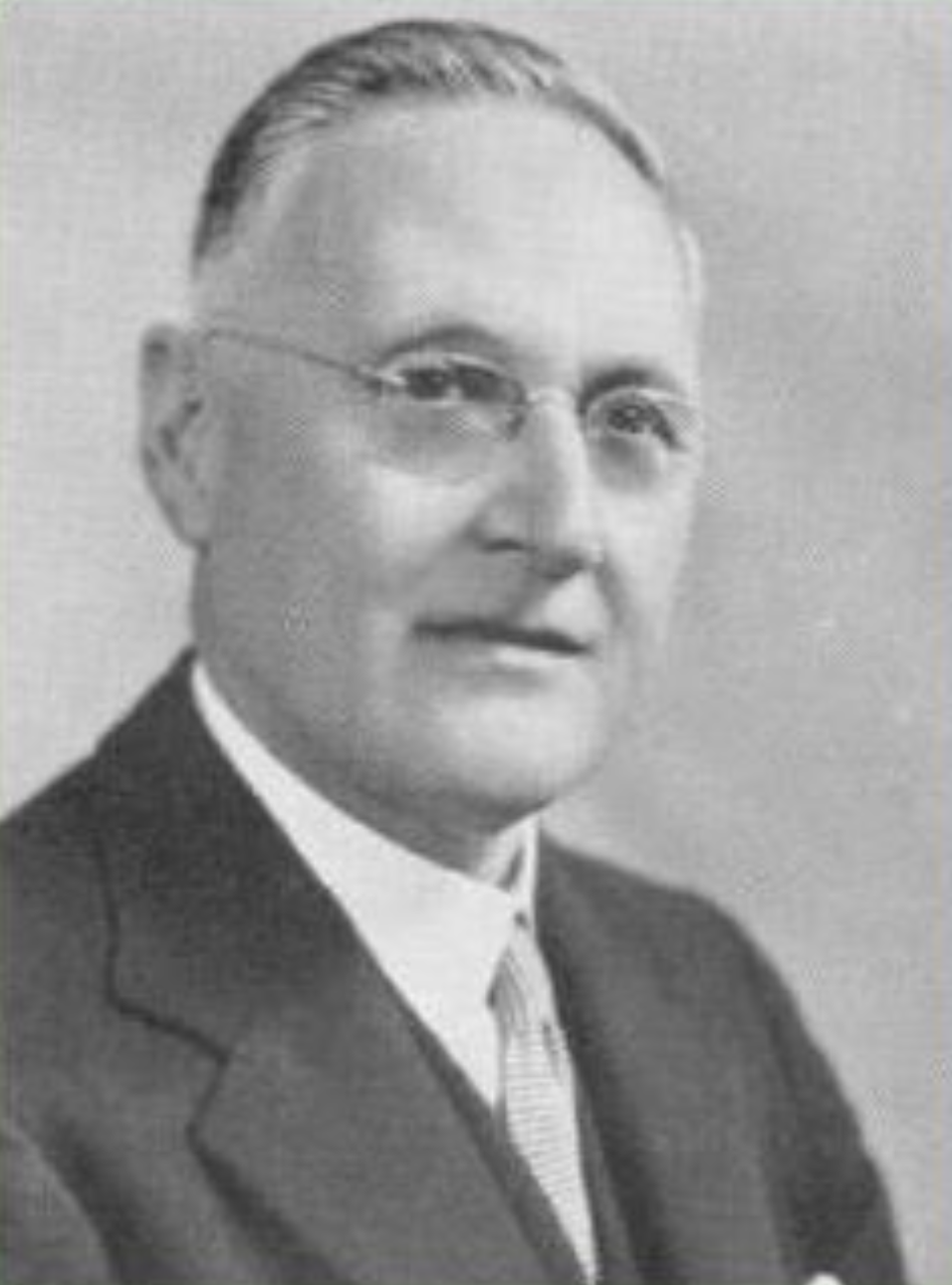
Makin in the 1950s

After leaving his diplomatic post, Makin returned to Australia. In October 1951, several months after his return, he campaigned for a "no" vote in the 1951 referendum on banning the Communist Party. In 1954, he decided to return to electoral politics, although he was by then 65 years old. At the 1954 election he captured the marginal Liberal seat of Sturt for Labor, defeating incumbent Keith Wilson with a 53 percent primary and two-party vote from a 5.4 percent swing. Sturt was significantly redistributed prior to the 1955 election. Most of the Labor-friendly territory in Sturt was shifted to the newly created Bonython. While this redistribution made Sturt notionally Liberal, Bonython was notionally a comfortably safe Labor seat. Makin opted to transfer to Bonython, a move which proved prescient; while Makin won Bonython easily, Wilson retook Sturt for the Liberals almost as easily. While still a Member of Parliament in 1961 he authored a book with brief biographies of all leaders of the Federal Parliamentary Labor Party until that time. He retired at the 1963 election, following an amendment to Labor Party rules that introduced a mandatory retirement age of seventy, though Makin unsuccessfully appealed the decision to the federal executive. He remained active in Labor affairs for many years following his retirement.

He died in 1982 at the age of 93, at Glenelg, where he had spent his last years in a Uniting Church aged care home, and was cremated. He was survived by two sons, who published Makin's memoirs, The Memoirs of Norman John Oswald Makin, 31 March 1889 – 20 July 1982, posthumously later that year. He was the second-last surviving member of the Curtin Cabinet behind Frank Forde, who died the following year.

== Honours ==
He was made an Officer of the Order of Australia (AO) in the 1980 Australia Day Honours.

The House of Representatives electorate of Makin, established in 1984 in Adelaide's northeastern suburbs, is named after him.

Parliament of Australia
Preceded by William Archibald	Member for Hindmarsh; 1919–1946	Succeeded by Albert Thompson
Preceded by Littleton Groom	Speaker of the Australian House of Representatives; 1929–1931	Succeeded by George Mackay
Preceded by Keith Wilson	Member for Sturt; 1954–1955	Succeeded by Keith Wilson
New division	Member for Bonython; 1955–1963	Succeeded by Martin Nicholls
Political offices
Preceded by Billy Hughes	Ministers for the Navy; 1941–1946	Succeeded by Arthur Drakeford
Preceded by Philip McBride	Ministers for Munitions; 1941–1946	Succeeded by John Dedman
Preceded by Don Cameron	Ministers for Aircraft Production; 1945–1946	Succeeded by John Dedman
Diplomatic posts
New title	Head of the Australian Delegation to the United Nations; 1945–1946	Succeeded by Paul Hasluck as Permanent Representative
Preceded by Sir Frederic Eggleston	Australian Ambassador to the United States; 1946–1951	Succeeded by Sir Percy Spender
New title	President of the United Nations Security Council; 1946	Succeeded by Cyro de Freitas Valle
Preceded by Herschel Johnson	President of the United Nations Security Council; January 1947	Succeeded by Fernand van Langenhove
