= Philip Flood =

Australian public servant and diplomat

Philip Flood AO
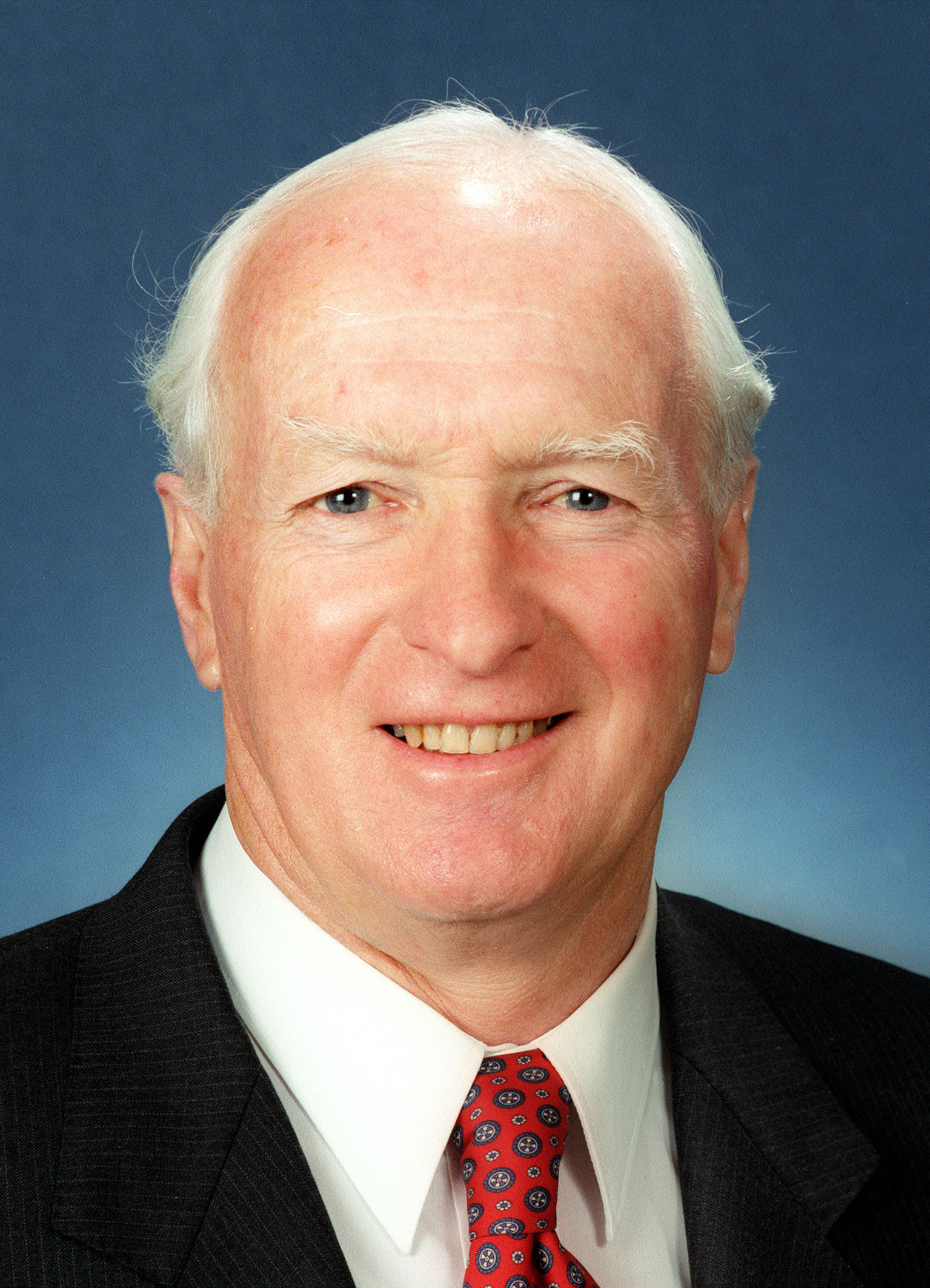

Secretary of the Australian Department of Foreign Affairs and Trade
- In office 8 March 1996 – 31 March 1998

High Commissioner to the United Kingdom
- In office 20 March 1998 – August 2000
- Preceded by: Neal Blewett
- Succeeded by: Michael L'Estrange

Personal details
- Born: Philip James Flood; 2 July 1935 (age 91)
- Spouse: Carole Flood
- Education: University of Sydney
- Occupation: Diplomat and public servant

Philip James Flood AO (born 2 July 1935) is a distinguished former Australian diplomat and a former senior public servant. The highlights of Flood's career include Secretary of the Department of Foreign Affairs and Trade and former High Commissioner to the United Kingdom. He was also Ambassador to Indonesia, Director-General of the Australian Agency for International Development, Director-General of the Office of National Assessments, and Head of the Inquiry into the Australian Intelligence Community (known as the Flood Report).

Since his retirement from the public service in 2000, Flood has been actively involved with CARE Australia, the Australia-Indonesia Institute and Asialink; and has headed several public inquiries, the most recent being the Inquiry into Plasma Fractionation, the Inquiry into Australia's Intelligence Agencies and the Inquiry into Detention Centres.

== Public service career ==
Flood attended the University of Sydney, obtaining a Bachelor of Economics (Hons) degree, before joining the Department of External Affairs in 1958. Flood rose quickly through the diplomatic ranks at the department, serving at the Australian mission to the European Economic Community in Brussels. He returned to Australia and served as Executive Assistant to the then Secretary of External Affairs, Sir Arthur Tange. He then was posted to the Australian Embassy in Paris and Delegation to the Organisation for Economic Co-operation and Development, where he was Counsellor. He then served as Australia's High Commissioner to Bangladesh.

Appointed to the Australian Embassy in the United States in 1976, Flood served as Minister and Deputy Head of Mission and subsequently appointed to the post of Chief Executive for Special Trade Negotiations. In 1985 he was appointed Deputy Secretary of the Department of Foreign Affairs and Trade. In 1989, Flood was appointed Australia's Ambassador to Indonesia; serving until 1993. Upon his return to Australia, Flood became Director General of AIDAB (renamed AusAID), the Australian development cooperation agency. In 1995, Flood was appointed Director General of the Australian Office of National Assessments.

In 1996, Flood was appointed Secretary of the Department of Foreign Affairs and Trade; until his appointment in 1998 as Australian High Commissioner to the United Kingdom; and his retirement from the diplomatic service in 2000.

== Career after public service ==
Appointed a Director of the Australia Indonesia Institute in 2000, the following year Flood was appointed by Alexander Downer as Chairman of the institute, where he served until 2004. Flood served as Deputy Chair CARE Australia 2007–2012, Board member from 2003; Deputy Chair Asialink 2005–2009, Board member from 2004; member of Foreign Affairs Council 2004–2007; and National President of the Order of Australia Association 2016–2019.

Flood headed the Inquiry into Immigration Detention Centres which reported to the Australian Government in February 2001; the report condemned the then detention centre at Woomera, and especially its treatment of children. He also headed the Inquiry into Australian Intelligence Agencies, which reported in July 2004; and the Inquiry into Plasma Fractionation, which reported in December 2006. The Inquiry into Australian Intelligence Agencies was the major report into the failure of intelligence on the Iraq War.

== Honours ==
In 1992, Flood was appointed an Officer of the Order of Australia in recognition of his service to international relations. He was given the Indonesian Order of Merit, called the Bintang Jasa Utama, for services to the development of relations between Australia and Indonesia. In 2001 Flood was granted the Centenary Medal for his significant contribution over many years to international relations.

== Published works ==
- Dancing with Warriors : A Diplomatic Memoir (hardback). North Melbourne, Victoria: Arcadia. 2011. p. 370. ISBN 978-1-921875-20-5.
- Odyssey by the Sea (softback). Canberra: Goanna. 2005. p. 84. ISBN 0-646-45504-4.
- Steady Hands Needed: Reflections on the role of the Secretary of Foreign Affairs and Trade, Eds Trevor Wilson and Graham Cooke (softback). Canberra: ANU E Press. 2008. pp. 67–82. ISBN 9781-9215-36137.

Diplomatic posts
Preceded by Jim Allen	Australian High Commissioner to Bangladesh; 1974–1975	Succeeded by Tim McDonald
Preceded by Bill Morrison	Australian Ambassador to Indonesia; 1989–1993	Succeeded by Allan Taylor
Preceded by Neal Blewett	Australian High Commissioner to the United Kingdom; 1998–2000	Succeeded by Michael L'Estrange
Government offices
Preceded by Michael Costello	Secretary of the Department of Foreign Affairs and Trade; 1996–1998	Succeeded by Ashton Calvert
