= Richard Alston (politician) =

Australian politician (born 1941)

The Honourable Richard Alston AO
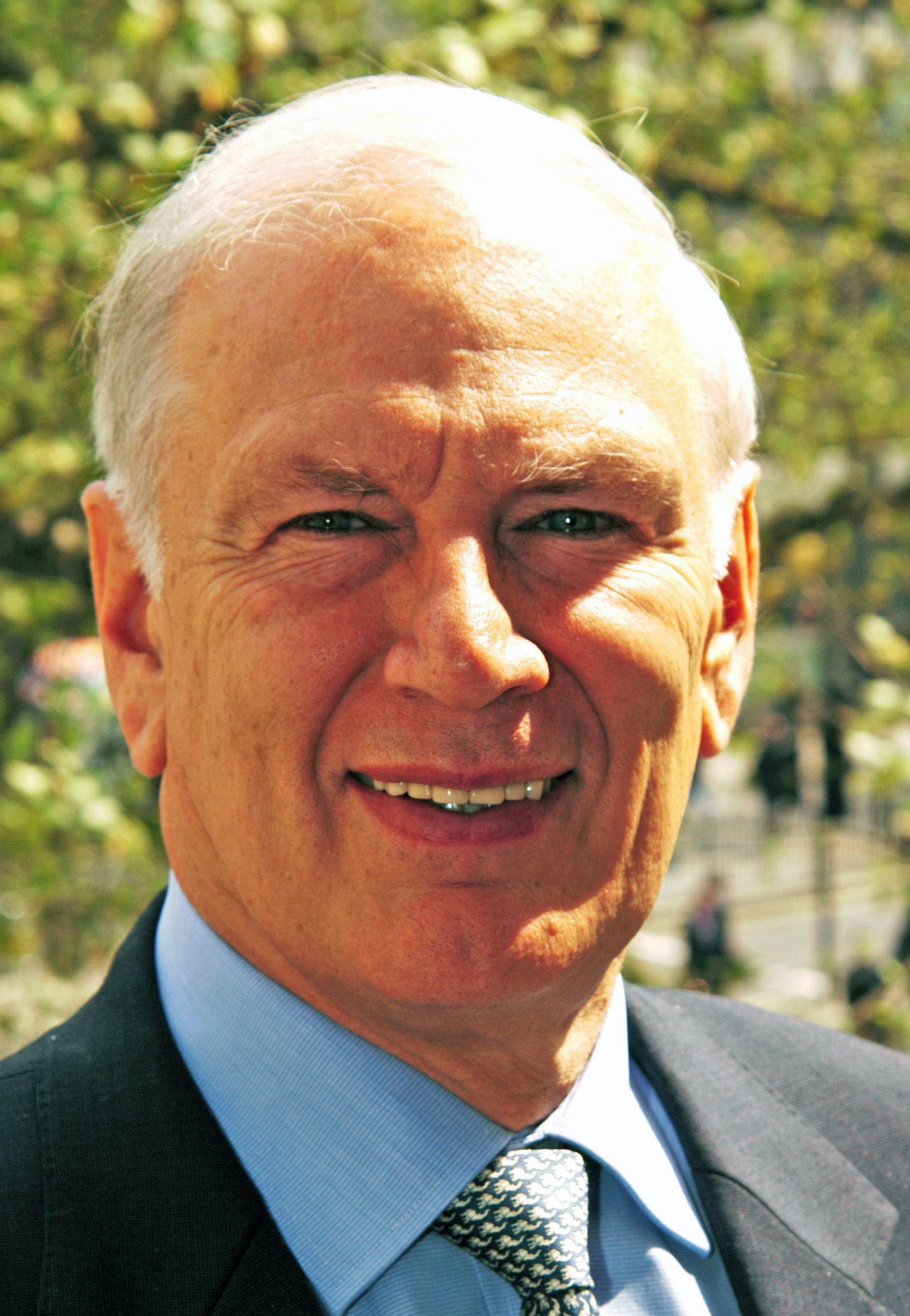

President of the Liberal Party of Australia
- In office 25 June 2014 – 24 June 2017
- Leader: Tony Abbott; Malcolm Turnbull
- Preceded by: Alan Stockdale
- Succeeded by: Nick Greiner

Australian High Commissioner to the United Kingdom
- In office February 2005 – September 2008
- Nominated by: John Howard
- Preceded by: Michael L'Estrange
- Succeeded by: John Dauth

Minister for Communications, Information Technology and the Arts
- In office 11 March 1996 – 7 October 2003
- Prime Minister: John Howard
- Preceded by: Michael Lee
- Succeeded by: Daryl Williams

Senator for Victoria
- In office 7 May 1986 – 10 February 2004
- Preceded by: Alan Missen
- Succeeded by: Mitch Fifield

Personal details
- Born: Richard Kenneth Robert Alston; 19 December 1941 (age 84) Perth, Western Australia, Australia
- Party: Liberal
- Relations: Philip Alston (brother)
- Education: University of Melbourne; Monash University
- Occupation: Barrister

Richard Kenneth Robert Alston AO (born 19 December 1941) is an Australian businessman, former politician and former barrister. He served as a Senator for Victoria from 1986 to 2004, representing the Liberal Party. During the Howard government he held ministerial office as Minister for Communications and the Arts (1996–1997), Communications, the Information Economy and the Arts (1997–1998), and Communications, Information Technology and the Arts (1998–2003). He was simultaneously Australia's longest serving Communications minister and Arts minister.

In his ministerial capacity he led more than a dozen telecommunications and IT trade missions around the world, as well as representing Australia at APEC Telecommunications Ministerial Conferences in Singapore, Cancun, Shanghai and the Gold Coast (chaired).

In 1999 he received an Award for Outstanding Contribution to the IT industry from the Asia-Oceania Computing Industry Organisation. In 2002 he was voted Best Asian Communications Minister and in 2003 he received an Outstanding Service Award from the Australian Venture Capital Association.

He served as High Commissioner to the United Kingdom (2005–2008) where he was a Commissioner of the Commonwealth War Graves Commission for three years. In 2007 he was the Australian Prime Minister's Special Envoy and Leader of the Australian delegation to the Commonwealth Heads of Government Meeting (CHOGM) in Uganda. From 2014 to 2017 he was Federal President of the Liberal Party and a member of the Party's Federal Executive for 18 years.

== Senate ==
On 7 May 1986 Alston was appointed by the Parliament of Victoria under section 15 of the Australian Constitution to fill the vacancy in the Australian Senate caused by the death of Senator Alan Missen. He was re-elected in 1987, 1990, 1996 and 2001.

Alston was a member of the Opposition Shadow Ministry from 1989 to 1996, and was Deputy Leader of the Opposition in the Senate 1993–96. Shadow Minister for Social Security, Child Care and Superannuation, as well as Communications and the Arts, were among the positions he held in the shadow ministry.

He was Minister for Communications and the Arts 1996–97, Minister for Communications, the Information Economy and the Arts 1997–98 and Minister for Communications, Information Technology and the Arts 1998–2003. He was also Deputy Leader of the Government in the Senate 1996–2003.

Alston resigned from the Senate on 10 February 2004, and he was replaced by Mitch Fifield.

== Later career ==
After leaving Parliament he was actively involved in businesses both in Australia and abroad. For seven years he was a member of the international advisory board of CQS LLP, one of the world's largest hedge funds and later on the board of its Australian subsidiary. For six years he was a director of a UK public company Chime plc. From 2010 to 2013 he was a member of the Asia-Pacific advisory board of Alcatel-Lucent.

He has chaired the boards of three publicly listed Australian companies, as well as Sunny Ridge, Australia's largest strawberry farm. He has been a member of the national and Victorian boards of the Australia China Business Council. He has been a member of the advisory board of investor relations firm, Market Eye, chairman of Qato, an Australian long-short fund, a director of Nanuk Asset Management, a director of CPA Australia for three years. and a director for many years of Balmoral Gardens, a retirement village owner. He is currently a director of China Telecom (Australia), chairman of National Advisory, an Australian corporate advisory firm and a member of the Council of the National Gallery of Australia.

He has served as the chairman of the Alliance Circle, an advisory board to an international partnership between Monash University and Warwick University (UK). He has been chairman of the Docklands Community Centre project and a board member of Chaplains Without Borders. From 2009 to 2011 he was chairman of the Melba Foundation, the owner of Melba Recordings, producers of internationally renowned classical music. Since 2009 he has been an adjunct professor at Bond University and a member of the board of trustees. He is also an adjunct associate professor at the University of NSW, Canberra. He is an ambassador-at-large of RedR Australia.

== Early life ==
Alston was educated at Xavier College (Kew), the University of Melbourne and Monash University, graduating with bachelor's degrees in law, arts and commerce from Melbourne University and master's degrees in law and business administration from Monash University. He was a barrister before entering politics.

His brother is noted academic Philip Alston. From February 2005 to February 2008, Alston served as Australian High Commissioner to the United Kingdom. Since 2004 he has been an adjunct professor of information technology at Bond University. Since 2022 he has been an adjunct associate professor at the University of NSW, UNSW Canberra.

Alston served as a member of the international board of CQS LLP, a United Kingdom-based hedge fund for seven years and as a director of its Australian subsidiary. Alston also served for six years as a director of United Kingdom-based public company, Chime PLC. He also served as chairman of the advisory board of Qato Capital, an Australian long short fund, as a director of Nanuk Asset Management and as a director of Balmoral Gardens, a retirement village owner and operator for many years and a director of CPA Australia for three years.

Alston was federal president of the Liberal Party from 2014 to 2017.

== Publications ==
- More to Life than Politics? (2020), a memoir
- Australia, the United States and China in a Post-Covid World (2020)
- Reflections on the EU Project and its Flaws: A Fatal Conceit about Markets and the Real World (2021)
- Donald Trump: The Ultimate Contrarian (2021)
- Their ABC: Inside Australia's Largest Sheltered Workshop (2022)
- Freedom of speech and diversity of expression, in 'Dignity and Prosperity' (2003)
- Political leadership in The Art of Crisis Management (2024)
- The Trouble with Elites (2024)
- The Glory of Dante (2024)

== Honours ==
At the 2015 Australia Day Honours, Alston was appointed an Officer of the Order of Australia for distinguished service to the Parliament of Australia, to international relations through diplomatic roles, to business development in diverse sectors, and to the community. Alston was also awarded the Centenary Medal in 2001 for service as Minister for Communications, Information Technology and the Arts.

Political offices
Preceded by Michael Lee	Minister for Communications, Information Technology and the Arts; 1996–2003	Succeeded by Daryl Williams
Parliament of Australia
Preceded by Alan Missen	Senator for Victoria; 1986–2004	Succeeded by Mitch Fifield
Diplomatic posts
Preceded by Michael L'Estrange	Australian High Commissioner to the United Kingdom; 2005–2008	Succeeded by John Dauth
