= Ashton Calvert =

Australian public servant

Ashton Calvert AC
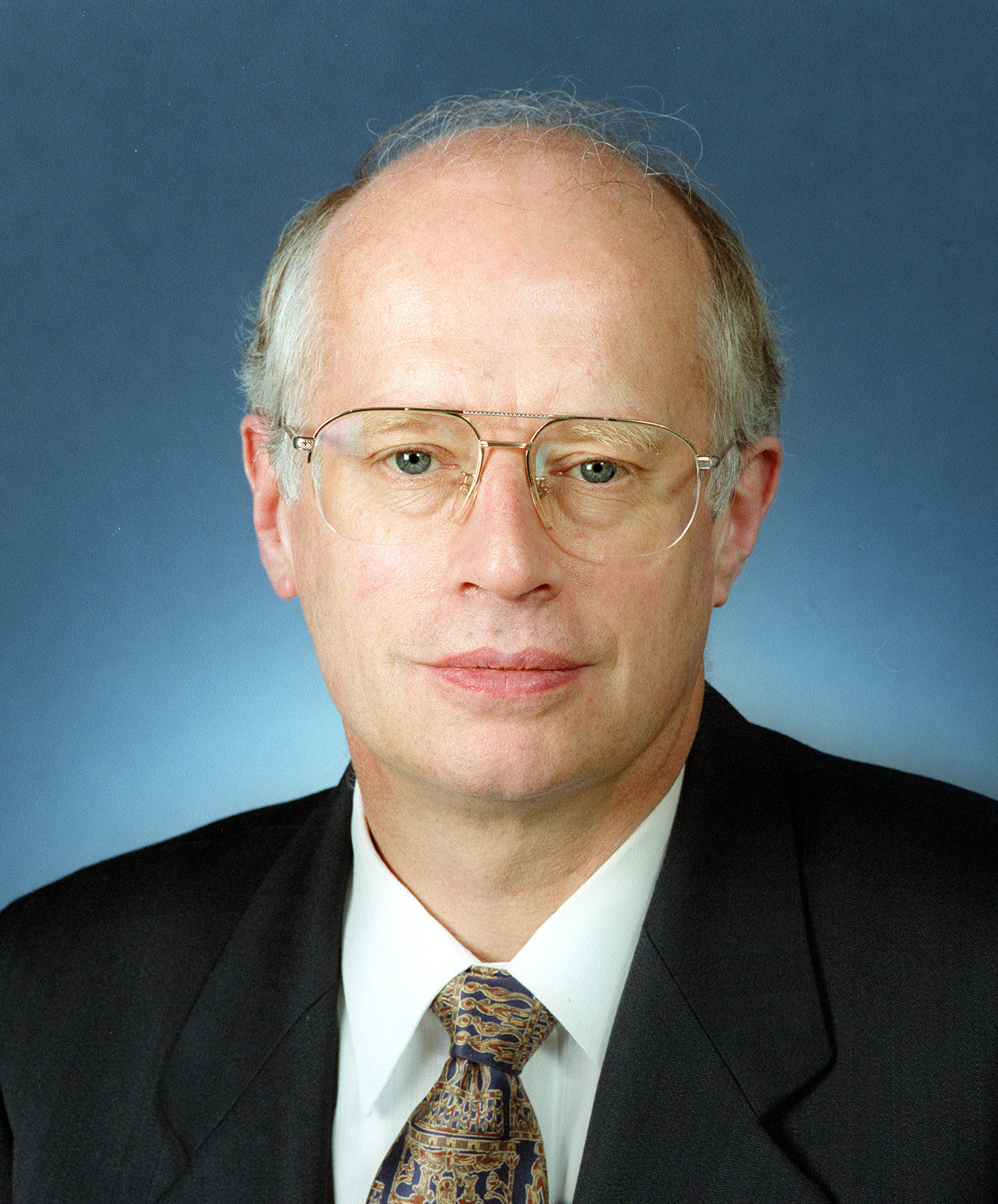

Secretary of the Department of Foreign Affairs and Trade
- In office 1 April 1998 – 4 January 2005

Ambassador of Australia to Japan
- In office 1993 – 1998

Personal details
- Born: 9 November 1945 Hobart, Tasmania
- Died: 16 November 2007 (aged 62) Canberra, Australian Capital Territory
- Occupation: Public servant

Ashton Trevor Calvert, AC (9 November 1945 – 16 November 2007) was a senior Australian public servant. He was Secretary of the Department of Foreign Affairs and Trade from April 1998 to January 2005.

== Early life ==
Ashton Calvert was born on 9 November 1945 in Hobart, Tasmania. He was the great-grandchild of William Calvert, a free settler to Tasmania who had arrived on the island in 1832.

Calvert attended Hobart High School and then the University of Tasmania. As a Rhodes Scholar, he went on to attend the University of Oxford, attaining a doctorate in mathematics. During his time at Oxford, Calvert was the president-cox of the Oxford rowing team.

== Career ==
Calvert joined the Australian Public Service in 1970 in the Department of External Affairs (later Department of Foreign Affairs). His first overseas post was to Japan in 1971, where he spent four years.

In October 1993, after nearly two years as a staffer in then Prime Minister Paul Keating's office, Calvert was appointed Australian Ambassador to Japan.

Calvert was appointed Secretary of the Department of Foreign Affairs and Trade in April 1998. During his time as Secretary of the department, Calvert made significant contributions to the Doha Development Round trade negotiations and helped to secure a deal to launch negotiations for a free trade agreement between Australia, New Zealand and the Association of Southeast Asian Nations (since concluded). Calvert retired from his Secretary role in January 2005.

Calvert joined the Rio Tinto Board with effect from 1 February 2005. In August 2005 he was appointed to the Woodside Petroleum Board. He resigned from both boards in November 2007 due to illness, after a medical diagnosis of aggressive cancer.

== Awards and honours ==
Calvert was made a Companion of the Order of Australia in January 2003 for service to the development of Australian foreign policy, including advancement of business relations between Australia and Japan, and for leadership and highly distinguished contributions to Australia's overall economic and security interests at critical times in the international environment.

In 2009, a street in the Canberra suburb of Casey was named Ashton Calvert Street to honour Calvert.

== Death ==
On 16 November 2007, in Canberra, Calvert died from cancer at age 62.

== References and further reading ==
- Butcher, John (August 2008), "Epilogue: 'The job is never done'", in Wilson, Trevor; Cooke, Graham (eds.), Steady Hands Needed: Reflections on the role of Secretary of Foreign Affairs and Trade in Australia 1979–1999 (PDF), pp. 83–93, ISBN 9781921536137, archived from the original (PDF) on 25 February 2014
- L'Estrange, Michael (16 November 2007). "Dr Ashton Calvert AC" (Press release). Archived from the original on 13 February 2014.
- Howard, John (2 December 2004). "Dr Ashton Calvert AC" (Press release). Archived from the original on 10 November 2013.
- Kelly, Paul (4 September 2009). "John Howard ministers took no advice before joining Iraq war". The Australian. News Corp Australia. Archived from the original on 10 July 2016. "Foreign Affairs and Trade head Ashton Calvert, interviewed for the book, said: "DFAT did not argue against that war role. In my view there was a strong and shared sense of policy direction on Iraq from Howard and Downer. In my view they didn't need advice on what they should do because they had, in effect, made up their minds.""
- "Former diplomat Calvert dies, aged 62". Brisbane Times. Fairfax Media. AAP. 16 November 2007. Archived from the original on 18 November 2007.
- Elliott, David, "Mathematics", The Companion to Tasmanian History, University of Tasmania, archived from the original on 6 September 2013

Diplomatic posts
Preceded by Rawdon Dalrymple	Australian Ambassador to Japan; 1993–1998	Succeeded by Peter Grey
Government offices
Preceded by Philip Flood	Secretary of the Department of Foreign Affairs and Trade; 1998–2005	Succeeded by Michael L'Estrange
