= Neal Blewett =

Australian politician and political scientist

The Honourable Neal Blewett AC
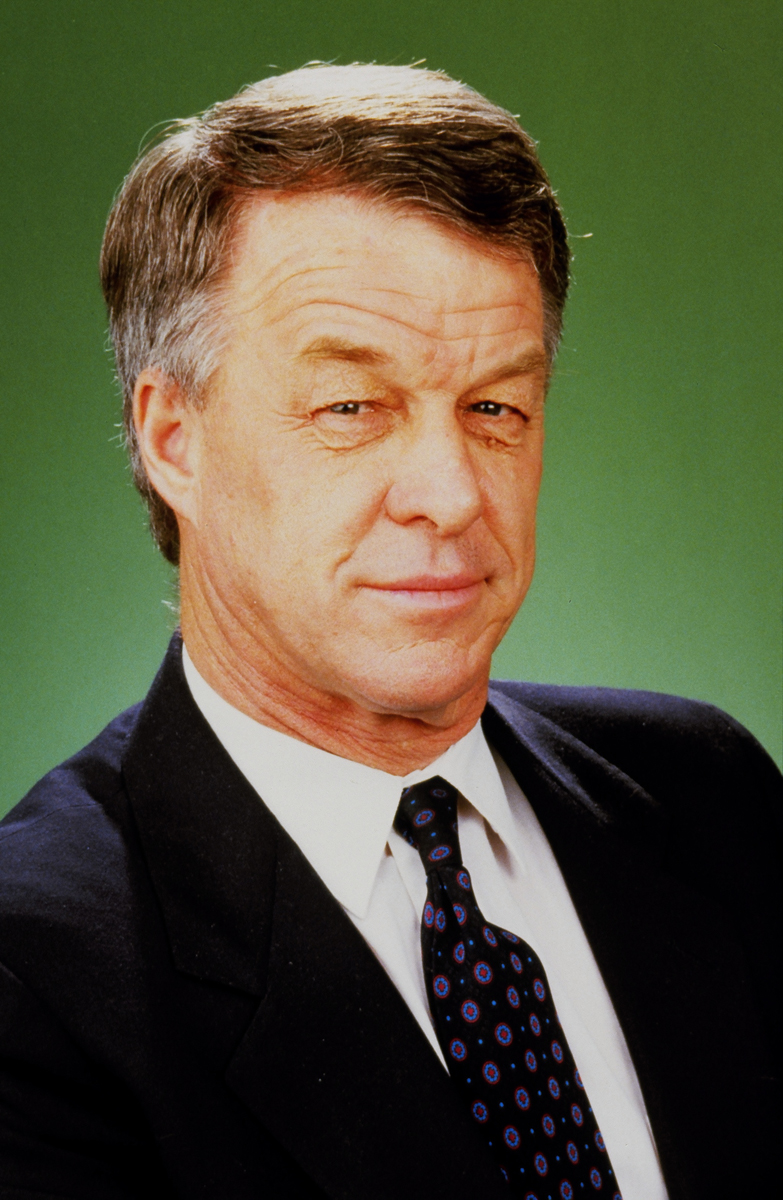
- Official portrait, 1994

Australian High Commissioner to the United Kingdom
- In office 1 April 1994 – 20 March 1998
- Monarch: Elizabeth II
- Prime Minister: Paul Keating; John Howard
- Preceded by: Richard Smith
- Succeeded by: Philip Flood

Minister for Social Security
- In office 27 December 1991 – 24 March 1993
- Prime Minister: Paul Keating
- Preceded by: Graham Richardson
- Succeeded by: Peter Baldwin

Minister for Trade Negotiations
- In office 4 April 1990 – 27 December 1991
- Prime Minister: Bob Hawke; Paul Keating
- Preceded by: Mike Duffy
- Succeeded by: John Kerin

Minister for Health
- In office 11 March 1983 – 4 April 1990
- Prime Minister: Bob Hawke
- Preceded by: Jim Carlton
- Succeeded by: Brian Howe

Member of the Australian Parliament for Bonython
- In office 10 December 1977 – 11 February 1994
- Preceded by: Martin Nicholls
- Succeeded by: Martyn Evans

Personal details
- Born: 24 October 1933 (age 93) Launceston, Tasmania, Australia
- Party: Australian Labor Party
- Spouse: Jill Blewett (m. 1962; died 1988)
- Domestic partner: Robert Brain (1989–present)
- Education: University of Tasmania; Jesus College, Oxford
- Occupation: Academic

Neal Blewett, AC (born 24 October 1933) is an Australian Labor Party politician, diplomat and historian. He was the Member of the House of Representatives for Bonython from 1977 to 1994. He served in both the Hawke and Keating governments, notably in the former as Minister for Health from 1983 to 1991, during which time he oversaw the Government's reaction to HIV/AIDS. After retiring from Parliament in 1994, he was appointed High Commissioner to the United Kingdom, a role he held until 1998.

== Education and academic career ==
Born in Launceston, Tasmania, Blewett was educated at Launceston High School and the University of Tasmania, from which he graduated with a Bachelor of Arts with Honours and a Diploma of Education. Blewett received a Rhodes Scholarship and studied PPE at Jesus College, Oxford between 1957 and 1959 for a further BA (later converted to a Master of Arts). He obtained a PhD from the University of Oxford in 1967.

An historian of British electoral politics of the Edwardian era, in 1972 Blewett published a study of the British general elections of January and December 1910. The book was very well received, described by reviewers "as one of the most substantial achievements of recent historical psephology" and "an extremely impressive monograph using practically every possible technique at the disposal of the professional historian". In 1974 Blewett was appointed professor of politics at Flinders University in South Australia, a position he held until 1977 when he ran for parliament.

== Political career ==
When Labor under Bob Hawke won government in the 1983 election, Blewett was made Minister for Health. In 1987, with the introduction of "super-departments", he gained additional responsibilities as Minister for Community Services and Health. As Health Minister, he oversaw many important reforms such as the implementation of the Medicare universal health scheme, the Disability Services Act 1986, a 'Drug Offensive' which included tobacco smoking and alcohol, and a national strategy to combat HIV/AIDS. The strategy included a major education and advertising campaign (including the famous 'Grim Reaper' advertisement), and legislation against discrimination against HIV/AIDS sufferers.

In 1990, he became Minister for Trade and Overseas Development. Blewett supported Paul Keating in his successful 1991 leadership challenge against Hawke, and when Keating became Prime Minister, Blewett became Minister for Social Security until he resigned from politics in 1994, sparking a Bonython by-election.

== Post-political career ==
In 1994, Neal Blewett was appointed Australian High Commissioner to the United Kingdom, as which he served until 1998. At the same time, he was on the Executive Council of the World Health Organization.

Returning to Australia in 1998, he became President of the Australian Institute of International Affairs and a visiting professor of the Faculty of Medicine at the University of Sydney. In 2002, he was appointed as President of the Alcohol and Other Drugs Council of Australia.

In 1999, he published A Cabinet Diary: A Personal Record of the First Keating Government 1991–93, his memoirs which detailed his time on the frontbench of the Keating government.

== Honours ==
Neal Blewett has received honorary degrees from the University of Tasmania, the University of Hull and the Australian National University. He was appointed an Honorary Fellow of Jesus College Oxford in 1998.

In 1995, he was appointed Companion of the Order of Australia (AC) for service to Australian society.

== Personal life ==
Neal Blewett was married for 26 years to Jill Blewett, a renowned Australian playwright, with whom he had two children. Jill died when she was electrocuted in their home in October 1988. The South Australian coroner made no finding that her death was accidental, and in his 1999 memoir A Cabinet Diary, Blewett said that his wife "took her own life in October 1988".

Blewett revealed he was homosexual in a May 2000 issue of The Age's Good Weekend magazine, which profiled his relationship with long-term partner Robert Brain, whom he had met as a university student 50 years previously. The couple live in Leura in the Blue Mountains, west of Sydney. Brain and Blewett moved in together in 1989, after which Blewett successfully sued a radio station and two doctors for claiming that he was imposing wrong AIDS policy because he was gay and because the gay community would not support a more appropriate policy. The defence argued that calling someone gay was not defamatory, but this argument was rejected. The defamation was that Blewett had imposed the wrong AIDS policy on Australia because he was gay and had refused to take the right action that gays wouldn't like. This was found to be false and defamatory.

== Publications ==
- Blewett, Neal (1972). The Peers, the Parties and the People: The British General Elections of 1910. Macmillan. ISBN 0333098110.
- Blewett, Neal (1999). A Cabinet Diary: A Personal Record of the First Keating Government 1991–93. Adelaide: Wakefield Press. ISBN 1-86254-464-6.

Parliament of Australia
Preceded by Martin Nicholls	Member for Bonython; 1977–1994	Succeeded by Martyn Evans
Political offices
Preceded by Jim Carlton	Minister for Health; 1983–1991	Succeeded by Brian Howe
Preceded by Michael Duffy	Minister for Trade and Overseas Development; 1990–1991	Succeeded by John Kerin
Preceded by Graham Richardson	Minister for Social Security; 1991–1993	Succeeded by Peter Baldwin
Diplomatic posts
Preceded by Richard Smith	Australian High Commissioner to the United Kingdom; 1994–1998	Succeeded by Philip Flood
