= Division of Bonython =

Former Australian federal electoral division

Coordinates: 34°43′12″S 138°40′23″E

Bonython Australian House of Representatives Division
- Created: 1955
- Abolished: 2004
- Namesake: Sir John Langdon Bonython

The Division of Bonython was an Australian Electoral Division in South Australia between 1955 and 2004. The division was named for Hon Sir John Langdon Bonython KCMG, who was an Australian editor, newspaper proprietor, philanthropist, journalist and politician who served as a member of the inaugural federal Parliament. Bonython was abolished in 2004, after a redistribution triggered by a change in representation entitlement which saw South Australia's seats in the House of Representatives reduced to eleven.

== History ==
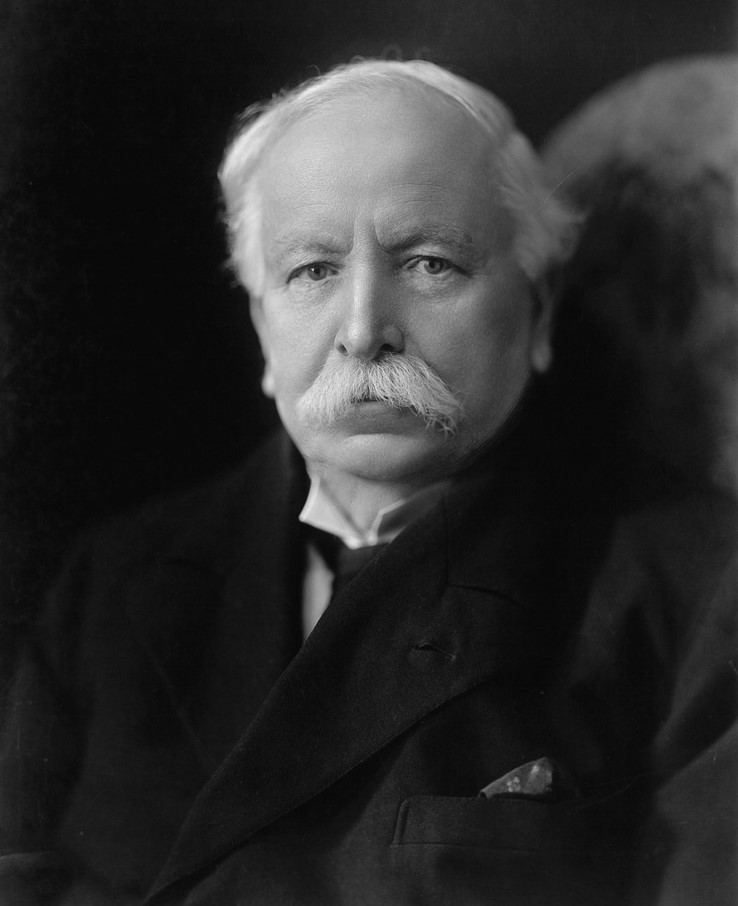
Hon Sir John Langdon Bonython KCMG, the division's namesake

When Bonython was created in 1955 it was a safe Labor seat, carved mostly from the Labor-leaning portions of the neighbouring Division of Sturt, and was thus a natural choice for Sturt's Labor incumbent, Norman Makin, to transfer in 1955. Besides Makin, its most notable member was Neal Blewett, a minister in the Hawke and Keating Governments.

Bonython's first 14 years saw vast boundaries simultaneously cover as far north as Gawler, as far south as Magill Road at Norwood, and as far west as Ottoway. The seat would continue to cross south of Grand Junction Road until the creation of the Division of Makin at the pre-1984 redistribution.

From creation until the 1984 expansion of parliament, Bonython was Labor's second safest seat in South Australia, behind the neighbouring Division of Port Adelaide directly west of Bonython. From 1984 until 1998, Bonython was Labor's safest seat in South Australia. The Liberals only came close to winning it once, in 1966 when they managed to hold Labor to only 52 percent of the two-party vote.

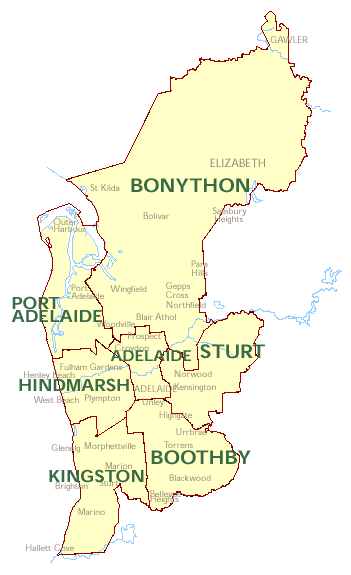
Bonython in 1967

In its final configuration at the 2001 Election, it was based on the outer northern suburbs of Elizabeth, Munno Para, Parafield, Paralowie, Salisbury, Virginia, and to the town of One Tree Hill in Adelaide's outskirts. The northern boundary being Gawler River with the Wakefield and Port Wakefield Road with the Division of Port Adelaide the western boundary.

Bonython was abolished for the 2004 Election due to the number of Divisions in South Australia being reduced to 11 following the 2003 redistribution. Apart from the south-west area between Port Wakefield Road and Main North Road which was shifted to the Division of Port Adelaide, the majority of the abolished Bonython was shifted to Division of Wakefield in the 2003 redistribution, transforming Wakefield from a safe Liberal seat to a notionally marginal Labor seat as a result. Port Adelaide and Wakefield were both abolished and replaced by Spence after a 2018 redistribution, on boundaries similar to those of Bonython at the time the latter was abolished.

== Members ==
Image	Member	Party	Term	Notes
	Norman Makin (1889–1982)	Labor	10 December 1955 – 1 November 1963	Previously held the Division of Sturt. Retired
	Martin Nicholls (1917–1983)	Labor	30 November 1963 – 30 September 1977	Served as Chief Government Whip in the House under Whitlam. Resigned to retire from politics
	Neal Blewett (1933–)	Labor	10 December 1977 – 11 February 1994	Served as minister under Hawke and Keating. Resigned to become the High Commissioner to the United Kingdom
	Martyn Evans (1953–)	Labor	19 March 1994 – 9 October 2004	Previously held the South Australian House of Assembly seat of Elizabeth. Failed to win the Division of Wakefield after Bonython was abolished in 2004
