= Martin Nicholls =

Australian politician

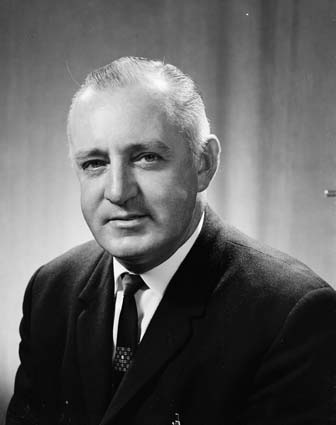

Member of the Australian Parliament for Bonython
- In office 30 November 1963 – 30 September 1977
- Preceded by: Norman Makin
- Succeeded by: Neal Blewett

Personal details
- Born: 3 April 1917 Adelaide, South Australia
- Died: 3 May 1983 (aged 66)
- Party: Australian Labor Party
- Relations: Theo Nicholls (uncle)
- Occupation: Tramwayman

Martin Henry Nicholls (3 April 1917 – 3 May 1983) was a politician, trade unionist and soldier from South Australia.

Born in Adelaide, South Australia, he received a primary education before becoming a tramwayman and serving in the military 1940–1945. He enlisted in July 1940, serving in Australia, including in the Darwin area from June 1942 until September 1943.

The nephew of Senator Theo Nicholls, he was President of the South Australian Tramways Union and Secretary of the South Australian Labor Party from 1958 to 1963. He was also a member of the ALP Federal Executive 1959–1969. In 1963, he was elected to the Australian House of Representatives as the Labor member for Bonython. He held the seat until his resignation due to ill health on 30 September 1977, which followed a heart attack earlier in the year and several months of absence from parliament. No by-election was held due to proximity to the upcoming federal election).

Nicholls died in 1983, aged 66.

Parliament of Australia
Preceded by Norman Makin	Member for Bonython; 1963–1977	Succeeded by Neal Blewett
