= 1994 Bonython by-election =

- 11 February 1994

	First party	Second party
Candidate	Martyn Evans	Andy Markwell
Party	Labor	Liberal
Popular vote	29,097	20,398
Percentage	45.92%	32.19%
Swing	▼9.68pp	▲3.50pp
TPP	56.90%	43.10%
TPP swing	▼7.85pp	▲7.85pp
MP before election
Neal Blewett
Labor
Elected MP
Martyn Evans
Labor

The 1994 Bonython by-election was held in the Australian federal electorate of Bonython in South Australia on 19 March 1994. The by-election was triggered by the retirement of the sitting member, the Australian Labor Party's Neal Blewett, on 11 February 1994. The writ for the by-election was issued on the same day.

== Results ==
Bonython by-election, 1994
Party	Candidate	Votes	%	±%
Labor	Martyn Evans	29,097	45.92	−9.68
Liberal	Andy Markwell	20,398	32.19	+3.50
Grey Power	George Bell	4,659	7.35	+7.35
AAFI	Denis McCormack	4,323	6.82	+6.82
Democrats	Philip Newey	3,960	6.25	−3.20
Independent	Jack Webb	923	1.46	+1.46
Total formal votes		63,360	94.45	−0.01
Informal votes		3,722	5.55	+0.01
Turnout		67,082	86.59	−8.04
Two-party-preferred result
Labor	Martyn Evans	36,013	56.90	−7.85
Liberal	Andy Markwell	27,284	43.10	+7.85
Labor hold		Swing	−7.85	

== See also ==
- List of Australian federal by-elections
