= Electoral district of Little Para =

Former state electoral district of South Australia

Little Para South Australia—House of Assembly
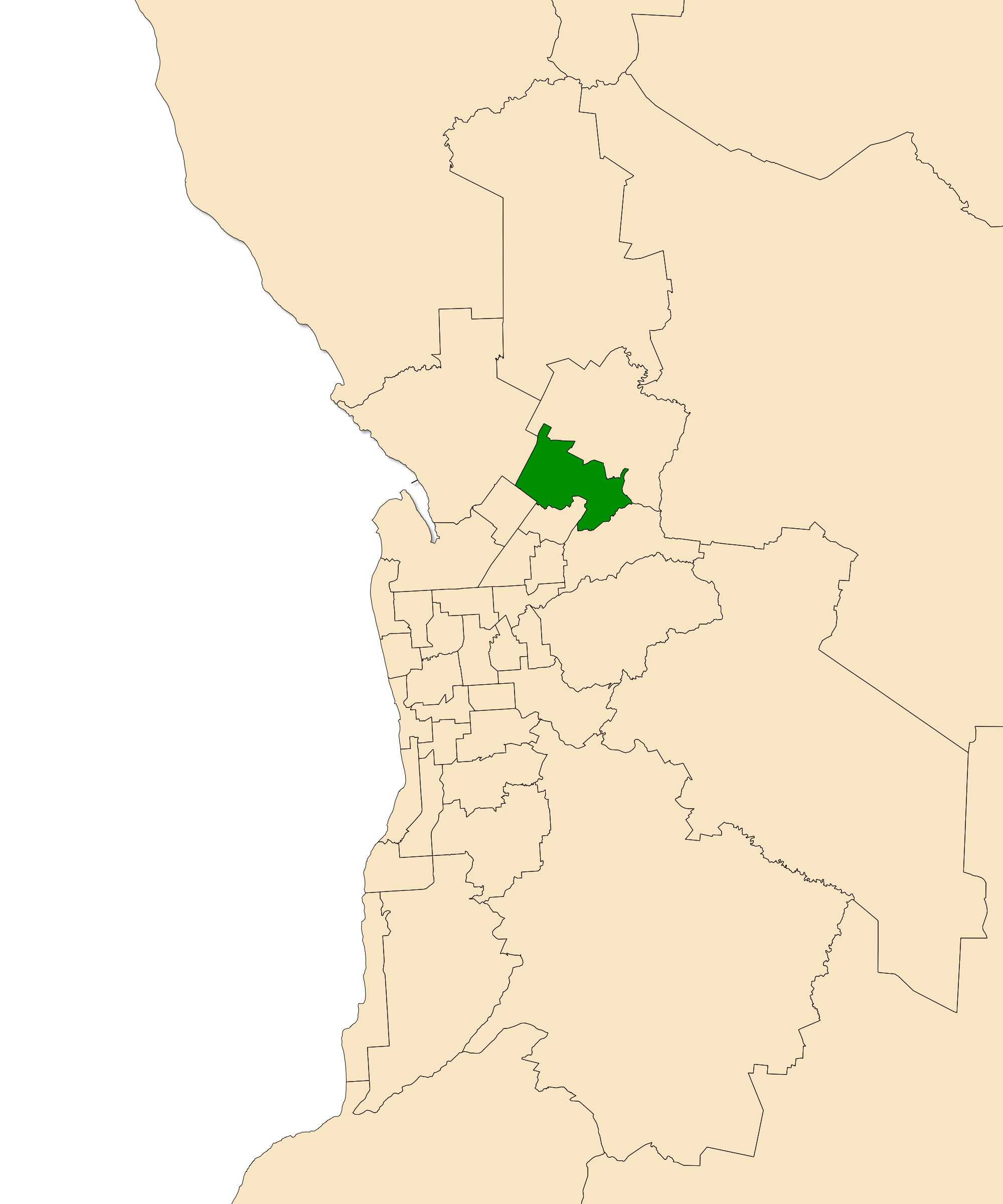
- Electoral district of Little Para (green) in the Greater Adelaide area
- State: South Australia
- Created: 2006
- Abolished: 2018
- Namesake: Little Para River
- Electors: 25,481 (2014)
- Area: 65.3 km^{2} (25.2 sq mi)
- Demographic: Metropolitan
- Coordinates: 34°44′34″S 138°42′43″E

Little Para was a single-member electoral district for the South Australian House of Assembly in the north of the Adelaide metropolitan area, covering the suburbs of Elizabeth, Elizabeth Grove, Elizabeth North, Elizabeth East, Elizabeth Park, Elizabeth South, Elizabeth Vale, Gould Creek, Hillbank, Salisbury Heights and Salisbury Park, and parts of Craigmore, Golden Grove and Greenwith.

The district was named after the Little Para River, located 20 km (12 mi) north of Adelaide, which passes through a number of suburbs within the electorate. The river was discovered by B. T. Finniss in 1837. "Para" is an Aboriginal term for 'stream of water'.

Renamed from Elizabeth at the 2006 state election, the electorate was originally drawn around the City of Elizabeth (now part of the City of Playford). The 1998 and 2002 redistributions made considerable changes, moving the focus further east. The electorate covers an area of approximately 65.3 km^{2} (25.2 sq mi).

Little Para was mostly working class, with some middle class suburbs on its eastern edges. All but the western end on the plains was in the foothills of the Adelaide Hills.

Little Para was abolished by a name change back to Elizabeth for the 2018 state election when the Little Para River became the southern boundary of the redrawn Electorate which now extended further north and the majority of the eastern portion of Little Para moved into the newly created King.

== Members for Little Para ==
Member	Party	Term
Lea Stevens	Labor	2006–2010
Lee Odenwalder	Labor	2010–2018

== Election results ==
2014 South Australian state election: Little Para
Party	Candidate	Votes	%	±%
Labor	Lee Odenwalder	10,300	47.0	−4.2
Liberal	Damien Pilkington	7,201	32.9	+2.9
Family First	Lloyd Rowlands	1,997	9.1	−1.8
Greens	Samantha Blake	1,459	6.7	−0.3
Dignity for Disability	Scott Whelan	954	4.4	+4.4
Total formal votes		21,911	95.6	−0.9
Informal votes		997	4.4	+0.9
Turnout		22,908	89.9	−2.8
Two-party-preferred result
Labor	Lee Odenwalder	12,573	57.4	−3.9
Liberal	Damien Pilkington	9,338	42.6	+3.9
Labor hold		Swing	−3.9	
