= Ella Shaw =

Australian politician

Ella Shaw MP

Member of the South Australian House of Assembly for Elizabeth
- Incumbent
- Assumed office 21 March 2026
- Preceded by: Lee Odenwalder

Personal details
- Party: Labor
- Spouse: Scott
- Education: University of Adelaide
- Profession: Union official Political organiser Policy advisor

Ella Rose Shaw is an Australian Labor politician who has served as the member for Elizabeth in the South Australian House of Assembly since the 2026 South Australian state election.

Prior to her election to the Parliament of South Australia, Shaw was a union official for the Shop, Distributive and Allied Employees Association (SDA), held various campaigning roles with SA Labor and worked as an advisor in the Department of Premier and Cabinet

South Australian House of Assembly
Preceded by Lee Odenwalder	Member for Elizabeth; 2026–present	Incumbent
