= Martyn Evans =

Australian politician

Member of the Australian Parliament for Bonython
- In office 19 March 1994 – 9 October 2004
- Preceded by: Neal Blewett
- Succeeded by: Division abolished

Member of the South Australian Parliament for Elizabeth
- In office 1 December 1984 – 18 February 1994
- Preceded by: Peter Duncan
- Succeeded by: Lea Stevens

Personal details
- Born: 27 November 1953 (age 72) Birmingham, England
- Party: Independent 1984-1993; Labor 1993-2004
- Education: University of Adelaide
- Occupation: Administrator

Martyn John Evans (born 27 November 1953 in Birmingham, England), is a former South Australian independent and Australian Labor Party state and federal politician.

Evans was educated at The University of Adelaide, and was a state government administrative officer before entering politics. Evans was a member of the City of Elizabeth council from 1975 to 1984 and served as mayor from 1981 to 1984.

Evans entered the South Australian House of Assembly following the 1984 Elizabeth by-election, caused when Peter Duncan resigned from the seat to contest the federal seat of Makin. Elected as a Labor independent, he served as Minister of Health, Family and Community Services and Minister for the Aged from 1992 to 1993, and rejoined Labor from 1993.

Evans moved from state to federal politics in 1994. He was Australian Labor Party member of the Australian House of Representatives from March 1994 to October 2004, representing the Division of Bonython, South Australia. A 1994 Elizabeth by-election was sparked when Evans resigned to contest the 1994 Bonython by-election. Evans was a member of the Opposition Shadow Ministry from 1996 to 2001.

The Division of Bonython was abolished at the 2003 electoral redistribution. Evans contested the Division of Wakefield at the 2004 election, which had absorbed most of Bonython's former territory and had become notionally Labor as a result. However, he was narrowly defeated by less than one percent.

Evans took up the position of director of community engagement at The University of Adelaide in July 2007.

Parliament of Australia
Preceded by Neal Blewett	Member for Bonython; 1994–2004	Division abolished
Parliament of South Australia
Preceded by Peter Duncan	Member for Elizabeth; 1984–1994	Succeeded by Lea Stevens
