= List of high commissioners of Australia to the United Kingdom =

High Commissioner of Australia to the United Kingdom

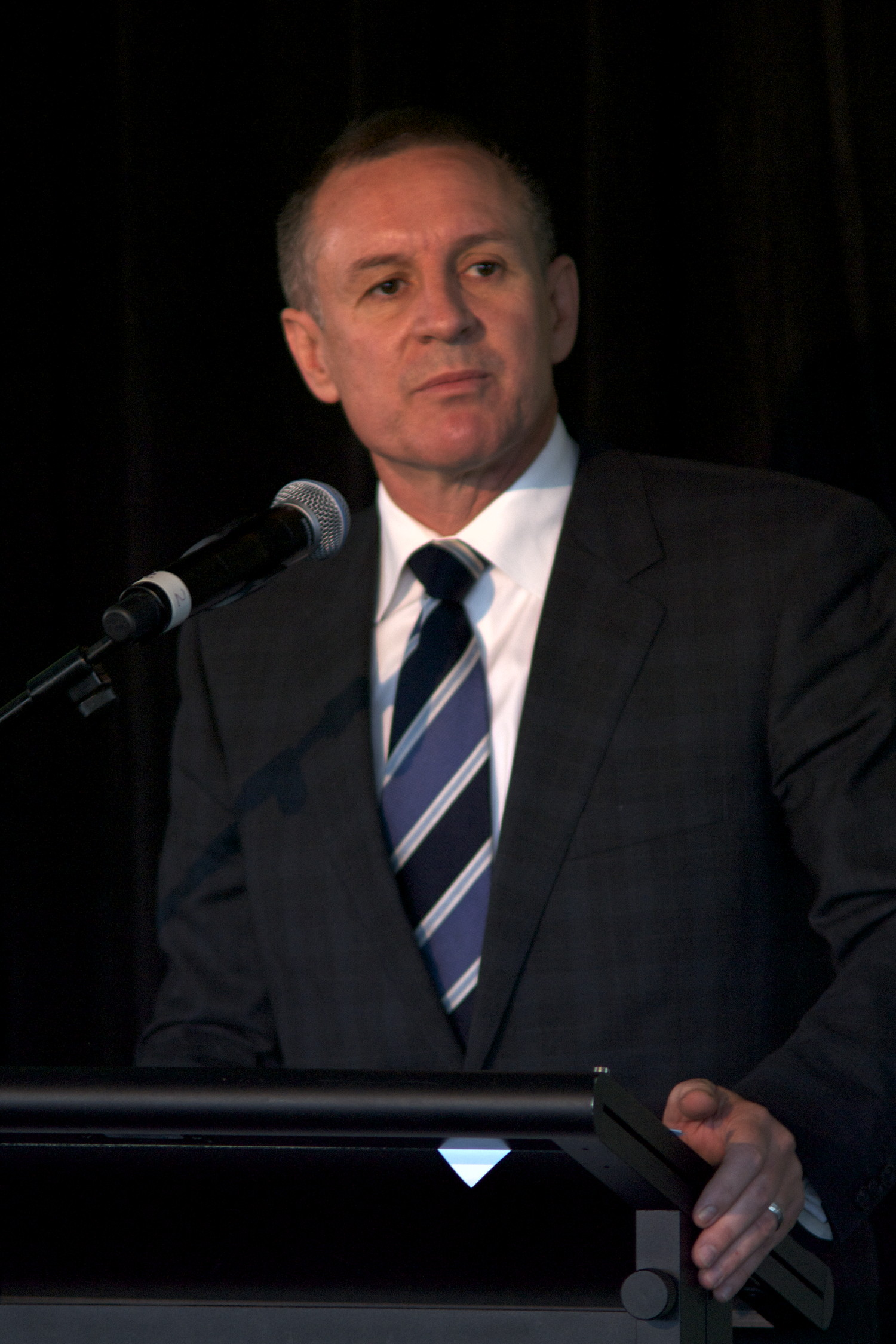
- Incumbent; Jay Weatherill since 27 January 2026
- Style: His/Her Excellency
- Reports to: Minister for Foreign Affairs
- Residence: Stoke Lodge, Hyde Park Gate
- Seat: High Commission of Australia, London
- Nominator: Prime Minister of Australia
- Appointer: Governor-General of Australia
- Inaugural holder: Sir George Reid
- Formation: 22 January 1910
- Website: Australian High Commission, United Kingdom

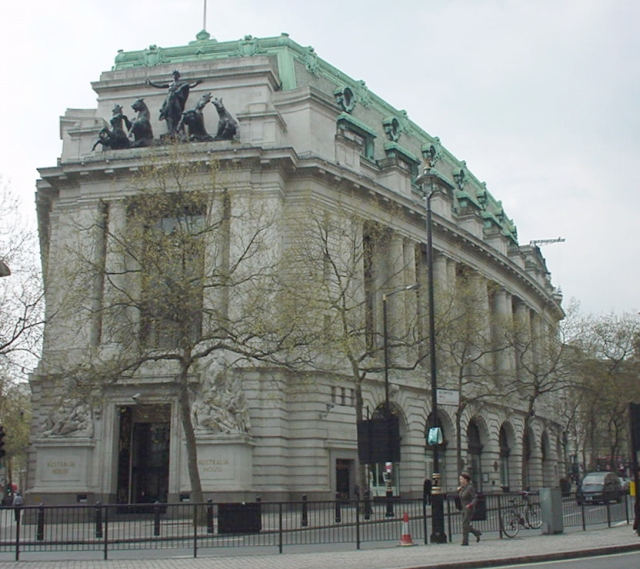
Australia House in London, opened by King George V on 3 August 1918.

The high commissioner of Australia to the United Kingdom is an officer of the Australian Department of Foreign Affairs and Trade and the head of the High Commission of the Commonwealth of Australia to United Kingdom of Great Britain and Northern Ireland in London. The position has the rank and status of an ambassador extraordinary and plenipotentiary. The high commissioner also serves as Australia's permanent representative to the International Maritime Organization (since 1959), a trustee of the Imperial War Museum and Australia's Commonwealth War Graves Commissioner.

On 30 September 2022, the former Defence and Foreign Affairs minister (who served under Kevin Rudd and Julia Gillard), Stephen Smith, was named as the next high commissioner, and took up office on 26 January 2023 and served until 27 January 2026 when he was succeeded by Jay Weatherill who served as Premier of South Australia from 2011 to 2018.

== Posting history ==
From Federation in 1901, the new Commonwealth government arranged to have all federal matters and communications handled by the various Agents-General of the states in London (acting with shared responsibility). Prior to federation, each of the Australian colonies were represented through the Agents-General, the oldest being South Australia from 1856. From 1905 the Agents-General formed a committee to jointly deal with Australian matters but on 20 February 1906, the Prime Minister, Alfred Deakin, announced the establishment of a dedicated Australian office in London, with the Secretary of the Department of Defence, Muirhead Collins, as the new office head. The States of New South Wales, Queensland, South Australia, Victoria and Western Australia continue to be represented by agents-general. Since the revival of the NSW agent-general in 2021, Tasmania is the only state that does not have an agent-general in London, having abolished its post in 1981 as a cost-saving measure.

The High Commission of Australia in London is Australia's oldest diplomatic posting, and was created through the passage of the High Commissioner Act 1909 on 13 December 1909, which established the role as appointed by the Governor-General and defined that they would "act as representative and resident agent of the Commonwealth in the United Kingdom, and in that capacity exercise such powers and perform such duties as are conferred upon and assigned to him by the Governor-General [and] carry out such instructions as he receives from the Minister respecting the commercial, financial, and general interests of the Commonwealth and the States in the United Kingdom and elsewhere." After the appointment of Reid as High Commissioner, Collins continued to serve as Official Secretary to the High Commissioner until his retirement in 1917. On 24 July 1913, King George V laid the foundation stone of Australia House, the future site of the Australia mission, which he also officially opened five years later on 3 August 1918.

The High Commissioner Act was amended several times (1937, 1940, 1945, 1952, 1957, 1966) and was repealed by the High Commission (United Kingdom) Act Repeal Act 1973, when Foreign Minister Don Willesee placed the High Commission under the terms of the Public Service Act like all other diplomatic posts. The new act altered the status of the High Commission to one of equality with all other bilateral posts, in recognition of the fact that Australia's relationship with the United Kingdom had changed. Four of Australia's early prime ministers served terms as High Commissioner after leaving office: Reid, Fisher, Cook and Bruce. The position has also been filled by five people who have served as the leader of the opposition in the Australian parliament: Reid, Fisher, Cook, H.V. Evatt and Alexander Downer. Until 1973, every high commissioner was a former government minister. Since then, a number of senior career diplomats have held the post, although former politicians are still regularly appointed.

From 1975 to 2001, the work of the High Commission was assisted by the Australian Consulate in Manchester. Established on 1 August 1975, the consulate largely dealt with trade and migration matters.

=== Residence ===
Prior to 1950, the high commissioner lived in various rented premises. From 1910, the first high commissioner, Sir George Reid, rented the residence of John Henniker Heaton at 33 Eaton Square, Belgravia. In 1927, the government of Prime Minister Stanley Bruce acquired the lease of 18 Ennismore Gardens in Knightsbridge, from the Earl of Listowel (and succeeding Lord Castlemaine as lessee), a four-storey 1858 terrace house, as the residence for high commissioner Sir Granville Ryrie. This remained the official residence until 1940, when high commissioner Stanley Bruce downsized to a smaller flat during the war years, and it remained empty until 1946, when high commissioner Jack Beasley took up residence. However, the Beasleys did not favour the size, style, and expense of this residence, and in late 1946 they moved to a smaller terraced house in Ilchester Place, Holland Park, which remained the official residence until 1950.

However, a need for a standalone official residence was identified by the Department of External Affairs, and a two-storey, 20-room, circa 1838 Georgian style residence known as "Stoke Lodge" at 45 Hyde Park Gate in Kensington was acquired in December 1950, with Resident Minister Eric Harrison, and his wife, being the first occupants. Since 1950, Stoke Lodge has been the official residence of all subsequent high commissioners, and often serves as an official reception venue. On 29 January 1952, high commissioner Sir Thomas White hosted Princess Elizabeth and the Duke of Edinburgh prior to their departure on a tour of Kenya, where Elizabeth would become Queen on 6 February. Stoke Lodge was originally built in 1838 by Robert Thew, a major of artillery in the East India Company, and in 1851 was the residence of Italian opera singer, Giulia Grisi. Caroline Ashurst Stansfeld was also resident when she died in 1885.

== High commissioners ==
| # | Officeholder | Image | Term start date | Term end date | Time in office | Notes |
|---|---|---|---|---|---|---|
| 1 | Sir George Reid | | 22 January 1910 | 10 January 1916 | 5 years, 353 days | |
| 2 | Andrew Fisher | | 22 January 1916 | 21 April 1921 | 5 years, 89 days | |
| – | Malcolm Shepherd (Acting) | | 21 April 1921 | 11 November 1921 | 204 days | |
| 3 | Sir Joseph Cook | | 11 November 1921 | 10 May 1927 | 5 years, 180 days | |
| 4 | Sir Granville Ryrie | | 11 May 1927 | 30 July 1932 | 5 years, 80 days | |
| – | J. R. Collins (Acting) | | 30 July 1932 | 7 September 1932 | 39 days | |
| 5 | Stanley Bruce (Resident Minister until 6 October 1933) | | 7 September 1932 | 5 October 1945 | 13 years, 28 days | |
| – | H. V. Evatt (Resident Minister) | | 5 October 1945 | 17 October 1945 | 12 days | |
| – | John Shiels Duncan (Acting) | | 17 October 1945 | 24 January 1946 | 99 days | |
| 6 | Jack Beasley (Resident Minister until 14 August 1946) | | 24 January 1946 | 2 September 1949 | 3 years, 221 days | |
| – | Sir Norman Mighell (Acting) | | 2 September 1949 | 23 April 1950 | 233 days | |
| 7 | Eric Harrison (Resident Minister) | | 23 April 1950 | 30 March 1951 | 341 days | |
| – | Edwin McCarthy (Acting) | | 30 March 1951 | 21 June 1951 | 83 days | |
| 8 | Sir Thomas White | | 21 June 1951 | 20 June 1956 | 4 years, 365 days | |
| – | Sir Edwin McCarthy (Acting) | | 20 June 1956 | 25 October 1956 | 127 days | |
| – | Sir Eric Harrison | | 25 October 1956 | 25 October 1964 | 8 years, 0 days | |
| 9 | Sir Alexander Downer | | 25 October 1964 | 24 October 1972 | 7 years, 365 days | |
| – | Bill Pritchett (Acting) | | 24 October 1972 | 28 January 1973 | 96 days | |
| 10 | John Armstrong | | 28 January 1973 | 31 January 1975 | 2 years, 3 days | |
| 11 | Sir John Bunting | | 1 February 1975 | March 1977 | 2 years, 1 month | |
| 12 | Sir Gordon Freeth | | March 1977 | March 1980 | 3 years | |
| 13 | Sir James Plimsoll | | March 1980 | 25 March 1981 | 1 year | |
| – | Frank Murray (Acting) | | 25 March 1981 | April 1981 | 0 months | |
| 14 | Sir Victor Garland | | April 1981 | 21 December 1983 | 2 years, 8 months | |
| 15 | Alfred Parsons | | 22 December 1983 | March 1987 | 3 years, 2 months | |
| 16 | Doug McClelland | | 21 March 1987 | March 1991 | 3 years, 11 months | |
| 17 | Richard Smith | | March 1991 | April 1994 | 3 years, 1 month | |
| 18 | Neal Blewett | | April 1994 | 20 March 1998 | 3 years, 11 months | |
| 19 | Philip Flood | | 20 March 1998 | August 2000 | 2 years, 4 months | |
| 20 | Michael L'Estrange | | August 2000 | February 2005 | 4 years, 6 months | |
| 21 | Richard Alston | | February 2005 | September 2008 | 3 years, 7 months | |
| 22 | John Dauth | | September 2008 | 23 August 2012 | 3 years, 11 months | |
| 23 | Mike Rann | | 23 August 2012 | 31 March 2014 | 1 year, 220 days | |
| 24 | Alexander Downer | | 31 March 2014 | 27 April 2018 | 4 years, 27 days | |
| 25 | George Brandis | | 3 May 2018 | 30 April 2022 | 3 years, 362 days | |
| – | Lynette Wood (Acting) | | 30 April 2022 | 26 January 2023 | 271 days | |
| 26 | Stephen Smith | | 26 January 2023 | 26 January 2026 | 3 years, 224 days | |
| 27 | Jay Weatherill | | 27 January 2026 | Incumbent | 223 days | |

== See also ==
- List of high commissioners of the United Kingdom to Australia
- Australia–United Kingdom relations
- Agent-General for New South Wales
