= Lea Stevens =

Australian politician (born 1947)

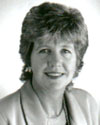

Member of the South Australian Parliament for Elizabeth
- In office 9 April 1994 – 18 March 2006
- Preceded by: Martyn Evans
- Succeeded by: Electorate renamed Little Para

Member of the South Australian Parliament for Little Para
- In office 18 March 2006 – 20 March 2010
- Succeeded by: Lee Odenwalder

Minister for Health
- In office 2002–2005

Personal details
- Born: 15 June 1947 (age 78)
- Party: Australian Labor Party (SA)

Lea Stevens (born 15 June 1947) is an Australian former politician. She was the Labor Party member for the electoral district of Little Para from the 1994 Elizabeth by-election to the 2010 state election.

Before her political career, Stevens gained a Bachelor of Science and Diploma of Education at the University of Adelaide. After her studies she worked as a high school principal at Fremont Elizabeth High School.

Stevens was the South Australian Minister for Health from early 2002 until late 2005, when she resigned for personal health reasons.

At the 2006 election, Stevens increased her margin to 16.7%, but she retired at the 2010 state election and was replaced by Lee Odenwalder.

South Australian House of Assembly
Preceded by Martyn Evans	Member for Elizabeth; 1994–2006	District abolished Renamed to Little Para
New district Renamed from Elizabeth	Member for Little Para; 2006–2010	Incumbent
