= Lee Odenwalder =

Australian politician

Member of the South Australian House of Assembly for Little Para
- In office 20 March 2010 – 17 March 2018
- Preceded by: Lea Stevens
- Succeeded by: Seat abolished

Member of the South Australian House of Assembly for Elizabeth
- In office 17 March 2018 – 20 March 2026
- Preceded by: New seat
- Succeeded by: Ella Shaw

Personal details
- Born: Lee Kenny Odenwalder London, England, UK
- Party: South Australian Labor Party
- Education: Fremont High School
- Alma mater: University of Adelaide

Lee Kenny Odenwalder is a former Australian Labor politician who represented the seat of Little Para in the South Australian House of Assembly from 2010 until its abolishment in 2018. He then served as the Member for Elizabeth from 2018 until his retirement in 2026.

== Early life and education ==
Lee Kenny Odenwalder was born in London, England, and moved to Australia with his parents in 1981. He attended Fremont High School in Elizabeth Park (now merged into the larger Playford International College). He has an honours degree in history from the University of Adelaide.

== Career ==
=== Early career ===
Odenwalder managed a video store, then joined the South Australia Police and was based at Elizabeth.

Odenwalder has been linked with the Shop, Distributive and Allied Employees Association (SDA).

=== Politics ===
Odenwalder, a member of the South Australian Labor Party, was elected to the South Australian House of Assembly in 2010. He first represented Little Para, and then, from the 2018 South Australian state election, represented the newly created seat of Elizabeth.

He announced on 8 October 2025 that he would not be recontesting his seat at the 2026 election, as after 16 years in politics it was time to "try something new".

South Australian House of Assembly
Preceded by Lea Stevens	Member for Little Para; 2010–2018	Abolished
New seat	Member for Elizabeth; 2018–2026	Succeeded by Ella Shaw
