= 1931 Australian House of Representatives election =

Australian federal election, 19 December 1931 House of Representatives << 1929–1934 >>
Enrolled voters	3,649,954				
Votes cast	3,286,474		Turnout	95.04	+0.19
Informal votes	114,440		Informal	3.48	+0.83
Summary of votes by party
Party	Primary votes	%	Swing	Seats	Change
United Australia	1,145,083	36.10%	+2.20%	33	19
Labor	859,513	27.14%	–21.74%	15	–31
Country	388,544	12.25%	+1.98%	16	+6
Lang Labor	335,309	10.57%	+10.57%	4	+4
Emergency Committee	174,288	5.49%	+5.49%	5	+5
Independent	260,786	6.02%	+2.20%	3	–1
Other	8,511	0.27%	+0.27%	0	±0
Total	3,172,034			76 (incl. Northern Territory)	

This is a list of electoral division results for the Australian 1931 federal election.

== New South Wales ==
=== Barton ===
1931 Australian federal election: Barton
Party	Candidate	Votes	%	±%
United Australia	Albert Lane	31,226	46.8	+14.4
Labor (NSW)	John Eldridge	22,669	33.9	+33.9
Labor	James Tully	12,877	19.3	−48.4
Total formal votes		66,772	97.5	
Informal votes		1,697	2.5	
Turnout		68,469	97.0	
Two-party-preferred result
United Australia	Albert Lane	35,538	53.2	+20.8
Labor (NSW)	John Eldridge	31,234	46.8	−20.8
United Australia gain from Labor		Swing	+20.8	

=== Calare ===
1931 Australian federal election: Calare
Party	Candidate	Votes	%	±%
Country	Harold Thorby	22,842	55.3	+55.3
Labor (NSW)	Tom Watson	10,604	25.7	+25.7
Labor	George Gibbons	7,863	19.0	−32.6
Total formal votes		41,309	97.7	
Informal votes		963	2.3	
Turnout		42,272	95.1	
Two-party-preferred result
Country	Harold Thorby		60.1	+11.7
Labor (NSW)	Tom Watson		39.9	+39.9
Country gain from Labor		Swing	+11.7	

=== Cook ===
1931 Australian federal election: Cook
Party	Candidate	Votes	%	±%
Labor (NSW)	Jock Garden	19,352	47.9	+47.9
Labor	Edward Riley	12,531	31.0	−53.2
United Australia	Charles Robinson	7,986	19.8	+4.0
Communist	Tom Wright	536	1.3	+1.3
Total formal votes		40,405	95.1	
Informal votes		2,063	4.9	
Turnout		42,468	96.4	
Two-party-preferred result
Labor	Edward Riley	20,560	50.9	−33.3
Labor (NSW)	Jock Garden	19,845	49.1	+49.1
Labor hold		Swing	−33.3	

=== Cowper ===
1931 Australian federal election: Cowper
Party	Candidate	Votes	%	±%
Country	Earle Page	29,266	72.3	−27.7
Labor	John Cusack	6,417	15.9	+15.9
Labor (NSW)	Tom Roach	4,790	11.8	+11.8
Total formal votes		40,473	98.8	
Informal votes		913	2.2	
Turnout		41,386	95.7	
Two-party-preferred result
Country	Earle Page		75.3	−24.7
Labor	John Cusack		24.7	+24.7
Country hold		Swing	−24.7	

=== Dalley ===
1931 Australian federal election: Dalley
Party	Candidate	Votes	%	±%
Labor (NSW)	Sol Rosevear	17,835	48.0	+48.0
United Australia	Sidney Massey	10,459	28.2	+6.1
Labor	Ted Theodore	7,272	19.6	+19.6
Ind. Nationalist	William Little	902	2.4	+2.4
Communist	Jack Sylvester	671	1.8	+1.8
Total formal votes		37,139	92.9	
Informal votes		2,832	7.1	
Turnout		39,971	95.9	
Two-party-preferred result
Labor (NSW)	Sol Rosevear	23,784	64.0	+64.0
United Australia	Sidney Massey	13,355	36.0	+8.9
Labor (NSW) gain from Labor		Swing	−8.9	

=== Darling ===
1931 Australian federal election: Darling
Party	Candidate	Votes	%	±%
Labor	Arthur Blakeley	14,581	40.8	−29.4
Country	Harold Campbell	11,847	33.1	+33.1
Labor (NSW)	Richard Quintrell	8,795	24.6	+24.6
Communist	Ted Tripp	522	1.5	+1.5
Total formal votes		35,745	94.8	
Informal votes		1,950	5.2	
Turnout		37,695	92.3	
Two-party-preferred result
Labor	Arthur Blakeley	22,828	63.9	−6.3
Country	Harold Campbell	12,917	36.1	+6.3
Labor hold		Swing	−6.3	

=== East Sydney ===
1931 Australian federal election: East Sydney
Party	Candidate	Votes	%	±%
United Australia	John Clasby	16,977	44.2	+12.6
Labor (NSW)	Eddie Ward	16,291	42.4	+42.4
Labor	George Buckland	5,112	13.3	−55.1
Total formal votes		38,380	96.2	
Informal votes		1,514	3.8	
Turnout		39,894	91.7	
Two-party-preferred result
United Australia	John Clasby	19,831	51.7	+11.7
Labor (NSW)	Eddie Ward	18,549	48.3	−11.7
United Australia gain from Labor		Swing	+11.7	

=== Eden-Monaro ===
1931 Australian federal election: Eden-Monaro
Party	Candidate	Votes	%	±%
United Australia	John Perkins	16,888	41.4	−8.5
Labor	Gerald O'Sullivan	12,619	30.9	−19.2
Country	Arthur Christian	11,334	27.8	+27.8
Total formal votes		40,841	97.6	
Informal votes		998	2.4	
Turnout		41,839	95.4	
Two-party-preferred result
United Australia	John Perkins	25,980	63.6	+13.7
Labor	Gerald O'Sullivan	14,861	36.4	−13.7
United Australia gain from Labor		Swing	+13.7	

=== Gwydir ===
1931 Australian federal election: Gwydir
Party	Candidate	Votes	%	±%
Country	Aubrey Abbott	18,321	45.6	+9.0
Labor	Lou Cunningham	9,995	24.9	−28.8
Labor (NSW)	Edward Cummins	7,931	19.8	+19.8
Country	Arnold Brown	3,900	9.7	+9.7
Total formal votes		40,147	96.6	
Informal votes		1,419	3.4	
Turnout		41,566	93.7	
Two-party-preferred result
Country	Aubrey Abbott		59.8	+13.5
Labor	Lou Cunningham		40.2	−13.5
Country gain from Labor		Swing	+13.5	

=== Hume ===
1931 Australian federal election: Hume
Party	Candidate	Votes	%	±%
Country	Thomas Collins	22,836	54.6	+11.2
Labor	Parker Moloney	14,208	34.0	−22.6
Labor (NSW)	Lynden Regan	4,771	11.4	+11.4
Total formal votes		41,815	98.2	
Informal votes		775	1.8	
Turnout		42,590	96.4	
Two-party-preferred result
Country	Thomas Collins		57.5	+14.1
Labor	Parker Moloney		42.5	−14.1
Country gain from Labor		Swing	+14.1	

=== Hunter ===
1931 Australian federal election: Hunter
Party	Candidate	Votes	%	±%
Labor (NSW)	Rowley James	23,194	48.1	+48.1
Independent	Arnold Bailey	18,879	39.2	+39.2
Labor	Allan Howie	4,213	8.7	−91.3
Communist	Harris Burnham	1,891	3.9	+3.9
Total formal votes		48,177	96.0	
Informal votes		2,008	4.0	
Turnout		50,185	96.4	
Two-party-preferred result
Labor (NSW)	Rowley James		57.2	+57.2
Independent	Arnold Bailey		42.8	+42.8
Labor (NSW) gain from Labor		Swing	+57.2	

=== Lang ===
1931 Australian federal election: Lang
Party	Candidate	Votes	%	±%
Labor (NSW)	Dan Mulcahy	13,249	30.7	+30.7
United Australia	Dick Dein	12,858	29.8	+15.5
Labor	William Long	8,669	20.1	−46.1
United Australia	Alfred Bennett	8,439	19.5	+19.5
Total formal votes		43,215	97.0	
Informal votes		1,355	3.0	
Turnout		44,570	94.9	
Two-party-preferred result
United Australia	Dick Dein	23,404	54.2	+20.4
Labor (NSW)	Dan Mulcahy	19,811	45.8	+45.8
United Australia gain from Labor		Swing	+20.4	

=== Macquarie ===
1931 Australian federal election: Macquarie
Party	Candidate	Votes	%	±%
United Australia	John Lawson	19,381	49.1	+14.7
Labor	Ben Chifley	11,085	28.1	−37.5
Labor (NSW)	Tony Luchetti	8,539	21.6	+21.6
Communist	Robert Deveney	499	1.3	+1.3
Total formal votes		39,504	96.1	
Informal votes		1,582	3.9	
Turnout		41,086	94.8	
Two-party-preferred result
United Australia	John Lawson	19,980	50.6	+16.2
Labor	Ben Chifley	19,524	49.4	−16.2
United Australia gain from Labor		Swing	+16.2	

=== Martin ===
1931 Australian federal election: Martin
Party	Candidate	Votes	%	±%
United Australia	William Holman	26,075	41.2	+25.1
United Australia	Mac Abbott	15,741	24.9	+24.9
Labor (NSW)	Charles Hankin	14,300	22.6	+22.6
Labor	James Catts	7,098	11.2	−40.5
Total formal votes		63,214	96.2	
Informal votes		2,469	3.8	
Turnout		65,683	96.2	
Two-party-preferred result
United Australia	William Holman	41,886	66.3	+22.7
Labor (NSW)	Charles Hankin	21,328	33.7	+33.7
United Australia gain from Labor		Swing	+22.7	

=== New England ===
1931 Australian federal election: New England
Party	Candidate	Votes	%	±%
Country	Victor Thompson	26,555	66.6	+12.0
Independent	Angus Campbell	13,295	33.4	+33.4
Total formal votes		39,850	95.4	
Informal votes		1,913	4.6	
Turnout		41,763	94.6	
Country hold		Swing	+12.0	

=== Newcastle ===
1931 Australian federal election: Newcastle
Party	Candidate	Votes	%	±%
Labor	David Watkins	15,290	30.5	−69.5
Labor (NSW)	James Kidd	13,233	26.4	+26.4
All for Australia	Rowland Clark	10,726	21.4	+21.4
Independent Labor	Walter Skelton	10,037	20.0	+20.0
Communist	Jack Simpson	910	1.8	+1.8
Total formal votes		50,196	95.0	
Informal votes		2,665	5.0	
Turnout		52,861	96.6	
Two-party-preferred result
Labor	David Watkins	32,194	64.1	−35.9
All for Australia	Rowland Clark	18,002	35.9	+35.9
Labor hold		Swing	−35.9	

=== North Sydney ===
1931 Australian federal election: North Sydney
Party	Candidate	Votes	%	±%
United Australia	Billy Hughes	22,317	40.8	+1.3
United Australia	Norman Cowper	19,724	36.0	+36.0
Labor (NSW)	Norman Nelson	12,696	23.2	+23.2
Total formal votes		54,737	98.3	
Informal votes		920	1.7	
Turnout		55,657	94.2	
Two-party-preferred result
United Australia	Billy Hughes		57.5	+23.6
United Australia	Norman Cowper		42.5	+42.5
United Australia gain from Independent		Swing	+23.6	

=== Parkes ===
1931 Australian federal election: Parkes
Party	Candidate	Votes	%	±%
United Australia	Charles Marr	34,502	59.9	+17.7
Labor (NSW)	Herbert Garden	16,483	28.6	+28.6
Labor	William Gibbs	6,636	11.5	−46.3
Total formal votes		57,621	97.5	
Informal votes		1,460	2.5	
Turnout		59,081	94.2	
Two-party-preferred result
United Australia	Charles Marr		62.8	+20.6
Labor (NSW)	Herbert Garden		37.2	+37.2
United Australia hold		Swing	+20.6	

=== Parramatta ===
1931 Australian federal election: Parramatta
Party	Candidate	Votes	%	±%
United Australia	Frederick Stewart	39,620	62.0	+15.3
Labor (NSW)	Valentine Patterson	13,727	21.5	+21.5
Labor	Albert Rowe	9,456	14.8	−38.5
Independent	Anwoth Brown	1,143	1.8	+1.8
Total formal votes		63,937	96.5	
Informal votes		2,313	3.5	
Turnout		66,250	95.0	
Two-party-preferred result
United Australia	Frederick Stewart		66.2	+19.5
Labor (NSW)	Valentine Patterson		33.8	+33.8
United Australia gain from Labor		Swing	+19.5	

=== Reid ===
1931 Australian federal election: Reid
Party	Candidate	Votes	%	±%
Labor (NSW)	Joe Gander	26,032	36.9	+36.9
United Australia	Robert Uebel	24,717	35.1	+9.7
Labor	Percy Coleman	19,724	28.0	−46.6
Total formal votes		70,473	97.3	
Informal votes		1,962	2.7	
Turnout		72,435	97.7	
Two-party-preferred result
Labor (NSW)	Joe Gander	38,974	55.3	+55.3
United Australia	Robert Uebel	31,499	44.7	+19.3
Labor (NSW) gain from Labor		Swing	+55.3	

=== Richmond ===
1931 Australian federal election: Richmond
Party	Candidate	Votes	%	±%
Country	Roland Green	14,342	35.2	−20.5
Country	Robert Gibson	10,874	26.7	+26.7
Independent	Jim Fredericks	8,383	20.5	+20.5
Country	Percy Tighe	5,830	14.3	+14.3
Country	Leonard Greening	1,370	3.4	+3.4
Total formal votes		40,799	93.7	
Informal votes		2,736	6.3	
Turnout		43,535	94.5	
Two-party-preferred result
Country	Roland Green	20,562	50.4	+50.4
Country	Robert Gibson	20,237	49.6	+49.6
Country hold		Swing	+50.4	

=== Riverina ===
1931 Australian federal election: Riverina
Party	Candidate	Votes	%	±%
Country	Robert Hankinson	14,778	34.3	+11.2
Country	Horace Nock	13,518	31.3	+31.3
Labor (NSW)	John Heiss	8,882	20.6	+20.6
Labor	Louis Levy	5,951	13.8	−31.8
Total formal votes		43,129	95.8	
Informal votes		1,875	4.2	
Turnout		45,004	94.0	
Two-party-preferred result
Country	Horace Nock	22,121	51.3	−3.1
Country	Robert Hankinson	21,008	48.7	+48.7
Country hold		Swing	−3.1	

=== Robertson ===
1931 Australian federal election: Robertson
Party	Candidate	Votes	%	±%
United Australia	Sydney Gardner	21,669	52.6	+1.1
Independent Country	William Fleming	8,246	20.0	+20.0
Labor (NSW)	Peter Robb	7,300	17.7	+17.7
Labor	Wilfred Turnbull	4,014	9.7	−38.8
Total formal votes		41,229	96.7	
Informal votes		1,546	3.6	
Turnout		42,775	96.2	
Two-party-preferred result
United Australia	Sydney Gardner		72.5	+21.0
Labor (NSW)	Peter Robb		27.5	+27.5
United Australia hold		Swing	+21.0	

=== South Sydney ===
1931 Australian federal election: South Sydney
Party	Candidate	Votes	%	±%
United Australia	John Jennings	26,711	49.2	+15.5
Labor (NSW)	John Stewart	17,071	31.4	+31.4
Labor	Edward Riley	10,512	19.4	−34.9
Total formal votes		54,294	97.5	
Informal votes		1,365	2.5	
Turnout		55,659	92.6	
Two-party-preferred result
United Australia	John Jennings	29,897	55.1	+21.4
Labor (NSW)	John Stewart	24,397	44.9	+44.9
United Australia gain from Labor		Swing	+21.4	

=== Warringah ===
1931 Australian federal election: Warringah
Party	Candidate	Votes	%	±%
United Australia	Archdale Parkhill	29,180	59.3	+47.4
United Australia	Walter Duncan	19,989	40.7	+40.7
Total formal votes		49,169	97.6	
Informal votes		1,187	2.4	
Turnout		50,356	95.8	
United Australia hold		Swing	+47.4	

=== Wentworth ===
1931 Australian federal election: Wentworth
Party	Candidate	Votes	%	±%
United Australia	Eric Harrison	35,460	65.8	+65.8
United Australia	Walter Marks	18,434	34.2	+34.2
Total formal votes		53,894	94.2	
Informal votes		3,293	5.8	
Turnout		57,187	92.8	
United Australia gain from Ind. Nationalist		Swing	+58.3	

=== Werriwa ===
1931 Australian federal election: Werriwa
Party	Candidate	Votes	%	±%
Country	Walter McNicoll	21,762	47.9	+47.9
Labor (NSW)	Bert Lazzarini	18,948	41.7	+41.7
Labor	Ernest Tully	4,254	9.4	−56.0
Ind. United Australia	Mont Sheppard	496	1.1	+1.1
Total formal votes		45,460	96.4	
Informal votes		1,679	3.6	
Turnout		47,139	94.6	
Two-candidate-preferred result
Country	Walter McNicoll	23,518	51.7	+51.7
Labor (NSW)	Bert Lazzarini	21,942	48.3	+48.3
Country gain from Labor		Swing	+17.1	

=== West Sydney ===
1931 Australian federal election: West Sydney
Party	Candidate	Votes	%	±%
Labor (NSW)	Jack Beasley	19,768	63.9	+63.9
United Australia	Arthur Butterell	6,579	21.3	+7.8
Labor	James Donaldson	4,596	14.9	−71.6
Total formal votes		30,943	95.8	
Informal votes		1,372	4.2	
Turnout		32,315	92.2	
Two-party-preferred result
Labor (NSW)	Jack Beasley		75.1	+75.1
United Australia	Arthur Butterell		24.9	+11.4
Labor (NSW) gain from Labor		Swing	+11.4	

== Victoria ==
=== Balaclava ===
1931 Australian federal election: Balaclava
Party	Candidate	Votes	%	±%
United Australia	Thomas White	41,703	75.5	+17.0
Labor	Edward Stewart	11,409	20.6	−20.9
Democratic	James Denyer	2,147	3.9	+3.9
Total formal votes		55,259	97.9	
Informal votes		1,187	2.1	
Turnout		56,446	97.1	
Two-party-preferred result
United Australia	Thomas White		76.5	+18.0
Labor	Edward Stewart		23.5	−18.0
United Australia hold		Swing	+18.0	

=== Ballaarat ===
1931 Australian federal election: Ballaarat
Party	Candidate	Votes	%	±%
United Australia	Charles McGrath	19,260	49.0	+6.4
Labor	Stewart Miller	13,409	34.1	−23.3
Country	Henry Bromfield	6,608	16.8	+16.8
Total formal votes		39,277	98.7	
Informal votes		505	1.3	
Turnout		39,782	97.6	
Two-party-preferred result
United Australia	Charles McGrath	24,859	63.3	+20.7
Labor	Stewart Miller	14,418	36.7	−20.7
United Australia gain from Labor		Swing	+20.7	

=== Batman ===
1931 Australian federal election: Batman
Party	Candidate	Votes	%	±%
United Australia	Samuel Dennis	30,148	48.8	+24.6
Labor	Frank Brennan	28,198	45.6	−30.2
Democratic	Frank Blake	2,323	3.8	+3.8
Communist	Jim Hannan	1,156	1.9	+1.9
Total formal votes		61,825	96.0	
Informal votes		2,606	4.0	
Turnout		64,431	94.9	
Two-party-preferred result
United Australia	Samuel Dennis	31,393	50.8	+26.6
Labor	Frank Brennan	30,432	49.2	−26.6
United Australia gain from Labor		Swing	+26.6	

=== Bendigo ===
1931 Australian federal election: Bendigo
Party	Candidate	Votes	%	±%
United Australia	Eric Harrison	23,710	59.5	+14.6
Labor	Richard Keane	16,167	40.5	−14.6
Total formal votes		39,877	98.7	
Informal votes		544	1.3	
Turnout		40,421	96.2	
United Australia gain from Labor		Swing	+14.6	

=== Bourke ===
1931 Australian federal election: Bourke
Party	Candidate	Votes	%	±%
Labor	Frank Anstey	26,948	47.7	−29.7
United Australia	Roy Ivey	25,572	45.2	+22.6
Independent	Walter Norman	2,357	4.2	+4.2
Communist	James Adie	1,644	2.9	+2.9
Total formal votes		56,521	95.4	
Informal votes		2,731	4.6	
Turnout		59,252	97.3	
Two-party-preferred result
Labor	Frank Anstey	28,897	51.1	−26.3
United Australia	Roy Ivey	27,624	48.9	+26.3
Labor hold		Swing	−26.3	

=== Corangamite ===
1931 Australian federal election: Corangamite
Party	Candidate	Votes	%	±%
Country	William Gibson	25,985	62.9	+15.0
Labor	Richard Crouch	15,321	37.1	−15.0
Total formal votes		41,306	98.7	
Informal votes		540	1.3	
Turnout		41,846	95.7	
Country gain from Labor		Swing	+15.0	

=== Corio ===
1931 Australian federal election: Corio
Party	Candidate	Votes	%	±%
United Australia	Richard Casey	18,724	37.0	−7.0
Labor	Arthur Lewis	17,623	34.9	−21.1
Ind. United Australia	John Lister	14,191	28.1	+28.1
Total formal votes		50,538	98.5	
Informal votes		776	1.5	
Turnout		51,314	93.9	
Two-party-preferred result
United Australia	Richard Casey	30,613	60.6	+16.6
Labor	Arthur Lewis	19,925	39.4	−16.6
United Australia gain from Labor		Swing	+16.6	

=== Echuca ===
1931 Australian federal election: Echuca
Party	Candidate	Votes	%	±%
Country	William Hill	16,116	39.7	−14.0
Independent Country	Galloway Stewart	14,278	35.2	+35.2
Independent Country	William Moss	8,020	19.8	+19.8
Ind. United Australia	John Fitzpatrick	2,168	5.3	+5.3
Total formal votes		40,582	96.7	
Informal votes		1,376	3.3	
Turnout		41,958	95.6	
Two-party-preferred result
Country	William Hill	21,278	52.4	−1.3
Independent	Galloway Stewart	19,304	47.6	+47.6
Country hold		Swing	−1.3	

=== Fawkner ===
1931 Australian federal election: Fawkner
Party	Candidate	Votes	%	±%
United Australia	George Maxwell	28,586	67.7	+29.3
Labor	John McKenna	11,508	27.2	+27.2
Independent	David Robertson	2,159	5.1	+5.1
Total formal votes		42,253	98.0	
Informal votes		880	2.0	
Turnout		43,133	93.1	
Two-party-preferred result
United Australia	George Maxwell		70.3	+21.7
Labor	John McKenna		29.7	+29.7
United Australia gain from Ind. Nationalist		Swing	+21.7	

=== Flinders ===
1931 Australian federal election: Flinders
Party	Candidate	Votes	%	±%
United Australia	Stanley Bruce	45,304	68.3	+20.2
Labor	Arthur Haywood	21,004	31.7	−16.5
Total formal votes		66,308	97.9	
Informal votes		1,418	2.1	
Turnout		67,726	95.7	
United Australia gain from Labor		Swing	+18.5	

=== Gippsland ===
1931 Australian federal election: Gippsland
Party	Candidate	Votes	%	±%
Country	Thomas Paterson	unopposed		
Country hold		Swing		

=== Henty ===
1931 Australian federal election: Henty
Party	Candidate	Votes	%	±%
United Australia	Henry Gullett	56,404	75.0	+26.4
Labor	Fred Katz	18,835	25.0	−20.4
Total formal votes		75,239	97.4	
Informal votes		1,985	2.6	
Turnout		77,224	94.2	
United Australia hold		Swing	+23.8	

=== Indi ===
1931 Australian federal election: Indi
Party	Candidate	Votes	%	±%
United Australia	William Hutchinson	18,149	45.0	+39.4
Labor	Paul Jones	14,190	35.2	−14.2
Country	Arthur Walter	8,011	19.9	−25.2
Total formal votes		40,350	98.2	
Informal votes		721	1.8	
Turnout		41,071	95.1	
Two-party-preferred result
United Australia	William Hutchinson	25,405	63.0	+63.0
Labor	Paul Jones	14,945	37.0	−14.4
United Australia gain from Labor		Swing	+14.4	

=== Kooyong ===
1931 Australian federal election: Kooyong
Party	Candidate	Votes	%	±%
United Australia	John Latham	50,590	76.5	+21.3
Labor	Cornelius Loughnan	15,557	23.5	−21.3
Total formal votes		66,147	98.2	
Informal votes		1,221	1.8	
Turnout		67,368	96.7	
United Australia hold		Swing	+21.3	

=== Maribyrnong ===
1931 Australian federal election: Maribyrnong
Party	Candidate	Votes	%	±%
United Australia	James Fenton	26,605	49.3	+22.5
Labor	William Beckett	26,242	48.6	−24.6
Democratic	William Scott	1,094	2.0	+2.0
Total formal votes		53,941	97.5	
Informal votes		1,358	2.5	
Turnout		55,299	98.1	
Two-party-preferred result
United Australia	James Fenton	27,195	50.4	+23.6
Labor	William Beckett	26,746	49.6	−23.6
United Australia gain from Labor		Swing	+23.6	

=== Melbourne ===
1931 Australian federal election: Melbourne
Party	Candidate	Votes	%	±%
Labor	William Maloney	22,224	62.0	−38.0
United Australia	Israel Smith	13,599	38.0	+38.0
Total formal votes		35,823	96.3	
Informal votes		1,357	3.6	
Turnout		37,180	93.6	
Labor hold		Swing	−38.0	

=== Melbourne Ports ===
1931 Australian federal election: Melbourne Ports
Party	Candidate	Votes	%	±%
Labor	Jack Holloway	22,901	56.4	−43.6
United Australia	William Orr	12,319	30.3	+30.3
Ind. United Australia	William Howey	3,945	9.7	+9.7
Communist	Thomas le Huray	823	2.0	+2.0
Lang Labor	Thomas Houston	448	1.1	+1.1
Independent	Noble Kerby	154	0.4	+0.4
Total formal votes		40,590	94.3	
Informal votes		2,445	5.7	
Turnout		43,035	95.2	
Two-party-preferred result
Labor	Jack Holloway		60.3	−39.7
United Australia	William Orr		39.7	+39.7
Labor hold		Swing	−39.7	

=== Wannon ===
1931 Australian federal election: Wannon
Party	Candidate	Votes	%	±%
United Australia	Thomas Scholfield	15,205	35.7	−12.3
Labor	John McNeill	14,772	34.7	−17.3
Country	Arthur Rodgers	12,627	29.6	+29.6
Total formal votes		42,604	98.9	
Informal votes		469	1.1	
Turnout		43,073	96.8	
Two-party-preferred result
United Australia	Thomas Scholfield	26,546	62.3	+14.3
Labor	John McNeill	16,058	37.7	−14.3
United Australia gain from Labor		Swing	+14.3	

=== Wimmera ===
1931 Australian federal election: Wimmera
Party	Candidate	Votes	%	±%
United Australia	William Morgan	12,763	28.0	+28.0
Independent	Alexander Dowsley	12,584	27.6	+27.6
Country	Hugh McClelland	12,071	26.5	+4.4
Country	Samuel Lockhart	5,233	11.5	+11.5
Country	William McCann	2,906	6.4	+6.4
Total formal votes		45,557	95.0	
Informal votes		2,377	5.0	
Turnout		47,934	95.8	
Two-party-preferred result
Country	Hugh McClelland	28,137	61.8	+21.8
Independent	Alexander Dowsley	17,420	38.2	+38.2
Country gain from Country Progressive		Swing	+21.8	

=== Yarra ===
1931 Australian federal election: Yarra
Party	Candidate	Votes	%	±%
Labor	James Scullin	22,843	59.9	−40.1
United Australia	John Davis	13,284	34.9	+34.9
Communist	Ernie Thornton	1,095	2.9	+2.9
Single Tax League	Patrick Branagan	895	2.3	+2.3
Total formal votes		38,117	93.8	
Informal votes		2,502	6.2	
Turnout		40,619	94.2	
Two-party-preferred result
Labor	James Scullin		63.3	−36.7
United Australia	John Davis		36.7	+36.7
Labor hold		Swing	−36.7	

== Queensland ==
=== Brisbane ===
1931 Australian federal election: Brisbane
Party	Candidate	Votes	%	±%
United Australia	Donald Cameron	19,965	48.9	−3.5
Labor	George Lawson	19,152	46.9	−0.7
Lang Labor	Hugh Talty	1,725	4.2	+4.2
Total formal votes		40,842	97.7	
Informal votes		957	2.3	
Turnout		41,799	92.7	
Two-party-preferred result
Labor	George Lawson	20,691	50.7	+3.1
United Australia	Donald Cameron	20,151	49.3	−3.1
Labor gain from United Australia		Swing	+3.1	

=== Capricornia ===
1931 Australian federal election: Capricornia
Party	Candidate	Votes	%	±%
Labor	Frank Forde	28,449	58.8	+5.4
Country	Robert Staines	19,944	41.2	+41.2
Total formal votes		48,393	97.1	
Informal votes		1,455	2.9	
Turnout		49,848	95.6	
Labor hold		Swing	+5.4	

=== Darling Downs ===
1931 Australian federal election: Darling Downs
Party	Candidate	Votes	%	±%
Independent	Sir Littleton Groom	23,597	54.7	+31.2
United Australia	Arthur Morgan	15,212	35.2	−11.4
Independent	Herbert Yeates	4,365	10.1	+10.1
Total formal votes		43,174	98.0	
Informal votes		879	2.0	
Turnout		44,053	97.0	
Two-party-preferred result
Independent	Sir Littleton Groom		59.8	+59.8
United Australia	Arthur Morgan		40.2	−17.7
Independent gain from United Australia		Swing	+17.7	

=== Herbert ===
1931 Australian federal election: Herbert
Party	Candidate	Votes	%	±%
Labor	George Martens	31,866	56.3	+3.5
United Australia	Grosvenor Francis	24,733	43.7	−3.5
Total formal votes		56,599	95.8	
Informal votes		2,473	4.2	
Turnout		59,072	92.9	
Labor hold		Swing	+3.5	

=== Kennedy ===
1931 Australian federal election: Kennedy
Party	Candidate	Votes	%	±%
Labor	Darby Riordan	17,605	60.2	+7.1
United Australia	Jim Clarke	11,655	39.8	−7.1
Total formal votes		29,260	96.3	
Informal votes		1,112	3.7	
Turnout		30,372	88.3	
Labor hold		Swing	+7.1	

=== Lilley ===
1931 Australian federal election: Lilley
Party	Candidate	Votes	%	±%
United Australia	George Mackay	30,422	53.8	−13.3
Independent Labor	Alexander Costello	18,988	33.6	+33.6
Social Credit	Frank Mason	7,185	12.7	+12.7
Total formal votes		56,595	97.0	
Informal votes		1,769	3.0	
Turnout		58,364	95.6	
Two-party-preferred result
United Australia	George Mackay		60.2	−6.9
Independent Labor	Alexander Costello		39.8	+39.8
United Australia hold		Swing	−6.9	

=== Maranoa ===
1931 Australian federal election: Maranoa
Party	Candidate	Votes	%	±%
Country	James Hunter	16,278	51.8	−3.1
Labor	Myles Ferricks	15,119	48.2	+3.1
Total formal votes		31,397	98.2	
Informal votes		564	1.8	
Turnout		31,961	92.2	
Country hold		Swing	−3.1	

=== Moreton ===
1931 Australian federal election: Moreton
Party	Candidate	Votes	%	±%
United Australia	Josiah Francis	unopposed		
United Australia hold		Swing		

=== Oxley ===
1931 Australian federal election: Oxley
Party	Candidate	Votes	%	±%
Labor	Francis Baker	29,252	54.3	+4.4
United Australia	James Bayley	23,563	43.7	−6.4
Lang Labor	Frank Pforr	1,094	2.0	+2.0
Total formal votes		53,909	97.3	
Informal votes		1,480	2.7	
Turnout		55,389	95.6	
Two-party-preferred result
Labor	Francis Baker		55.8	+5.9
United Australia	James Bayley		44.2	−5.9
Labor gain from United Australia		Swing	+5.9	

=== Wide Bay ===
1931 Australian federal election: Wide Bay
Party	Candidate	Votes	%	±%
Country	Bernard Corser	unopposed		
Country hold		Swing		

== South Australia ==
=== Adelaide ===
1931 Australian federal election: Adelaide
Party	Candidate	Votes	%	±%
Emergency Committee	Fred Stacey	15,907	42.1	+3.5
Labor	George Edwin Yates	11,193	29.6	−31.8
Lyons Latham	Crawford Vaughan	4,500	11.9	+11.9
Lang Labor	Tom Howard	3,058	8.1	+8.1
Independent	Agnes Goode	2,449	6.5	+6.5
Communist	John Zwolsman	655	1.7	+1.7
Total formal votes		37,762	90.7	
Informal votes		3,872	9.3	
Turnout		41,634	94.6	
Two-party-preferred result
Emergency Committee	Fred Stacey	22,523	59.6	+21.0
Labor	George Edwin Yates	15,239	40.4	−21.0
Emergency Committee gain from Labor		Swing	+21.0	

=== Angas ===
1931 Australian federal election: Angas
Party	Candidate	Votes	%	±%
Independent	Moses Gabb	37,719	76.8	+31.5
Labor	David Fraser	11,390	23.2	−31.5
Total formal votes		49,109	96.4	
Informal votes		1,843	3.6	
Turnout		50,952	96.7	
Independent gain from Labor		Swing	+31.5	

=== Barker ===
1931 Australian federal election: Barker
Party	Candidate	Votes	%	±%
Emergency Committee	Malcolm Cameron	50,597	64.0	+12.8
Labor	Cyril Hasse	10,904	22.8	−26.0
Independent	Percy Spehr	6,291	13.2	+13.2
Total formal votes		47,792	94.5	
Informal votes		2,765	5.5	
Turnout		50,557	96.3	
Two-party-preferred result
Emergency Committee	Malcolm Cameron		70.7	+19.5
Labor	Cyril Hasse		29.3	−19.5
Emergency Committee hold		Swing	+19.5	

=== Boothby ===
1931 Australian federal election: Boothby
Party	Candidate	Votes	%	±%
Emergency Committee	John Price	30,440	68.5	+24.1
Labor	Cecil Skitch	10,016	22.5	−33.1
Single Tax League	Sam Lindsay	3,978	9.0	+9.0
Total formal votes		44,434	94.6	
Informal votes		2,530	5.4	
Turnout		46,964	96.1	
Two-party-preferred result
Emergency Committee	John Price		74.0	+29.6
Labor	Cecil Skitch		26.0	−29.6
Emergency Committee gain from Labor		Swing	+29.6	

=== Grey ===
1931 Australian federal election: Grey
Party	Candidate	Votes	%	±%
Emergency Committee	Philip McBride	16,372	48.1	+48.1
Labor	Andrew Lacey	12,691	37.3	−22.3
Single Tax League	James Hodgson	3,674	10.8	+10.8
Independent	Alfred Barns	1,292	3.8	+3.8
Total formal votes		34,029	95.0	
Informal votes		1,805	5.0	
Turnout		35,834	93.9	
Two-party-preferred result
Emergency Committee	Philip McBride	19,560	57.5	+57.5
Labor	Andrew Lacey	14,469	42.5	−17.1
Emergency Committee gain from Labor		Swing	+17.1	

=== Hindmarsh ===
1931 Australian federal election: Hindmarsh
Party	Candidate	Votes	%	±%
Labor	Norman Makin	28,047	54.7	−45.3
Emergency Committee	Ernest Evans	20,657	40.3	+40.3
Lang Labor	Sid O'Flaherty	2,524	4.9	+4.9
Total formal votes		51,228	95.7	
Informal votes		2,301	4.3	
Turnout		53,529	96.2	
Two-party-preferred result
Labor	Norman Makin		58.4	−41.6
Emergency Committee	Ernest Evans		41.6	+41.6
Labor hold		Swing	−41.6	

=== Wakefield ===
1931 Australian federal election: Wakefield
Party	Candidate	Votes	%	±%
Emergency Committee	Charles Hawker	22,596	65.3	+29.2
Independent Country	Maurice Collins	12,030	34.7	+34.7
Total formal votes		34,626	95.4	
Informal votes		1,674	4.6	
Turnout		36,300	96.9	
Emergency Committee hold		Swing	+8.4	

== Western Australia ==
=== Forrest ===
1931 Australian federal election: Forrest
Party	Candidate	Votes	%	±%
Country	John Prowse	unopposed		
Country hold		Swing		

=== Fremantle ===
1931 Australian federal election: Fremantle
Party	Candidate	Votes	%	±%
Labor	John Curtin	19,142	42.0	−15.0
Independent	William Watson	14,092	30.9	−12.1
United Australia	Keith Watson	12,365	27.1	+27.1
Total formal votes		45,599	97.9	
Informal votes		968	2.1	
Turnout		46,567	94.1	
Two-party-preferred result
Independent	William Watson	25,328	55.5	+12.5
Labor	John Curtin	20,271	44.5	−12.5
Independent gain from Labor		Swing	+12.5	

=== Kalgoorlie ===
1931 Australian federal election: Kalgoorlie
Party	Candidate	Votes	%	±%
Labor	Albert Green	15,419	57.5	−6.4
Country	William Pickering	7,156	26.7	+3.6
United Australia	George Rainsford	4,248	15.8	+2.8
Total formal votes		26,823	97.1	
Informal votes		807	2.9	
Turnout		27,630	86.5	
Two-party-preferred result
Labor	Albert Green		59.1	−6.1
Country	William Pickering		40.9	+6.1
Labor hold		Swing	−6.1	

=== Perth ===
1931 Australian federal election: Perth
Party	Candidate	Votes	%	±%
United Australia	Walter Nairn	22,102	60.5	+25.0
Labor	John Moloney	14,459	39.5	−3.6
Total formal votes		36,561	95.4	
Informal votes		1,762	4.6	
Turnout		38,323	91.3	
United Australia hold		Swing	+10.0	

=== Swan ===
1931 Australian federal election: Swan
Party	Candidate	Votes	%	±%
Country	Henry Gregory	26,234	54.7	−45.3
Labor	John Fraser	14,232	29.7	+29.7
Independent	Carlyle Ferguson	4,623	9.6	+9.6
Independent Country	Alfred Reynolds	2,832	5.9	+5.9
Total formal votes		47,921	95.7	
Informal votes		2,131	4.3	
Turnout		50,002	92.5	
Two-party-preferred result
Country	Henry Gregory		63.8	−36.2
Labor	John Fraser		36.2	+36.2
Country hold		Swing	−36.2	

== Tasmania ==
=== Bass ===
1931 Australian federal election: Bass
Party	Candidate	Votes	%	±%
United Australia	Allan Guy	10,293	46.6	+7.0
Labor	Claude Barnard	6,763	30.6	−29.8
Nationalist	Harold Solomon	5,032	22.8	+22.8
Total formal votes		32,088	94.9	
Informal votes		1,197	5.1	
Turnout		23,285	96.5	
Two-party-preferred result
United Australia	Allan Guy	14,247	64.5	+24.9
Labor	Claude Barnard	7,841	35.5	−24.9
United Australia gain from Labor		Swing	+24.9	

=== Darwin ===
1931 Australian federal election: Darwin
Party	Candidate	Votes	%	±%
United Australia	George Bell	16,149	69.9	+16.3
Labor	Joseph McGrath	6,962	30.1	−16.3
Total formal votes		23,111	96.3	
Informal votes		887	3.7	
Turnout		23,998	96.3	
United Australia hold		Swing	+14.0	

=== Denison ===
1931 Australian federal election: Denison
Party	Candidate	Votes	%	±%
United Australia	Arthur Hutchin	12,078	55.0	+13.3
Labor	Charles Culley	9,868	45.0	−12.5
Total formal votes		21,946	95.0	
Informal votes		1,166	5.0	
Turnout		23,112	96.7	
United Australia gain from Labor		Swing	+14.2	

=== Franklin ===
1931 Australian federal election: Franklin
Party	Candidate	Votes	%	±%
United Australia	Archibald Blacklow	12,819	56.0	+10.9
Labor	Charles Frost	7,274	31.8	+31.8
Independent	Albert Beard	2,778	12.1	+12.1
Total formal votes		22,871	95.0	
Informal votes		1,195	5.0	
Turnout		24,066	96.4	
Two-party-preferred result
United Australia	Archibald Blacklow		63.0	+17.9
Labor	Charles Frost		37.0	+37.0
United Australia gain from Labor		Swing	+17.9	

=== Wilmot ===
1931 Australian federal election: Wilmot
Party	Candidate	Votes	%	±%
United Australia	Joseph Lyons	12,622	60.2	+13.1
Labor	George Becker	5,586	26.6	−26.3
Nationalist	George Pullen	2,776	13.2	+13.2
Total formal votes		20,984	95.3	
Informal votes		1,026	4.7	
Turnout		22,010	96.0	
Two-party-preferred result
United Australia	Joseph Lyons		72.1	+25.0
Labor	George Becker		27.9	−25.0
United Australia gain from Labor		Swing	+25.0	

== Northern Territory ==
=== Northern Territory ===
1931 Australian federal election: Northern Territory
Party	Candidate	Votes	%	±%
Labor	Harold Nelson	747	50.4	−49.6
Independent	William Easton	577	39.0	+39.0
Independent Labor	John McMillan	157	10.6	+10.6
Total formal votes		1,481	97.6	
Informal votes		37	2.4	
Turnout		1,518	67.7	
Two-party-preferred result
Labor	Harold Nelson		55.7	−44.3
Independent	William Easton		44.3	+44.3
Labor hold		Swing	−44.3	

== See also ==
- Candidates of the 1931 Australian federal election
- Members of the Australian House of Representatives, 1931–1934
