= Candidates of the 1931 Australian federal election =

This article provides information on candidates who stood for the 1931 Australian federal election. The election was held on 19 December 1931.

In 1931, the Nationalist Party had become the United Australia Party, absorbing five Labor defectors. In New South Wales, the Labor Party split, with the Lang Labor group voting against the Labor government. Seats held by Labor defectors are here considered to be held by the Labor Party.

== By-elections, appointments and defections ==
=== By-elections and appointments ===
- On 14 December 1929, Charles Frost (Labor) was elected to replace William McWilliams (Independent) as the member for Franklin.
- On 31 January 1931, Charles Marr (Nationalist) was elected to replace Edward McTiernan (Labor) as the member for Parkes.
- On 7 March 1931, Eddie Ward (Labor) was elected to replace John West (Labor) as the member for East Sydney.
- On 1 April 1931, Harry Kneebone (Labor) was appointed as a South Australian Senator to replace John Chapman (Country).
- On 12 May 1931, Tom Brennan (UAP) was appointed as a Victorian Senator to replace Harold Elliott (UAP).
- On 14 October 1931, Percy Stewart (Independent), the member for Wimmera, died. No by-election was held due to the proximity of the election.
- Subsequent to the election, but prior to the new Senate taking its place:
  - On 23 December 1931, Patrick Mooney (NSW Labor) was appointed as a New South Wales Senator to replace Walter Duncan (UAP).
  - On 3 March 1932, Charles Grant (UAP) was appointed as a Tasmanian Senator to replace James Ogden (UAP).

=== Defections ===
- In 1930, the three MPs elected as Independent Nationalists in 1929 – Billy Hughes (North Sydney), Walter Marks (Wentworth) and George Maxwell (Fawkner) – constituted themselves as the Australian Party.
- In 1931, Labor MPs James Fenton (Maribyrnong), Moses Gabb (Angas), Allan Guy (Bass), Joseph Lyons (Wilmot), Charles McGrath (Ballaarat) and John Price (Boothby) resigned from the party in protest at the reappointment of Ted Theodore as Treasurer. They sat with the Opposition Nationalist Party and soon merged with them to become the United Australia Party. The UAP was also joined by the three Australian Party MPs, Billy Hughes (North Sydney), Walter Marks (Wentworth) and George Maxwell (Fawkner).
- In 1931, supporters of NSW Premier Jack Lang broke away from the federal Labor Party to form the Australian Labor Party (NSW). Federally, these members were Jack Beasley (West Sydney), Senator James Dunn (New South Wales), John Eldridge (Martin), Rowley James (Hunter), Bert Lazzarini (Werriwa), Senator Arthur Rae (New South Wales) and Eddie Ward (East Sydney).

== Seat changes ==
- The member for Eden-Monaro (NSW), John Cusack (Labor), contested Cowper.
- The member for Flinders (Vic), Jack Holloway (Labor), contested Melbourne Ports.
- The member for Martin (NSW), John Eldridge (NSW Labor), contested Barton.
- New South Wales Senator Walter Duncan (UAP) resigned from the Senate to contest Warringah.

== Retiring Members and Senators ==
=== Labor ===
- James Mathews MP (Melbourne Ports, Vic)

=== United Australia ===
- Senator Sir John Newlands (SA)

=== Country ===
- William Killen MP (Riverina, NSW)

== House of Representatives ==
Sitting members at the time of the election are shown in bold text. Successful candidates are highlighted in the relevant colour. Where there is possible confusion, an asterisk (*) is also used.

=== New South Wales ===
Electorate	Held by	Labor candidate	Coalition candidate	Labor (NSW) candidate	Other candidates
Barton	Labor	**James Tully**	Albert Lane (UAP)	**John Eldridge**	
Calare	Labor	**George Gibbons**	Harold Thorby (CP)	Tom Watson	
Cook	Labor	**Edward Riley**	Charles Robinson (UAP)	Jock Garden	Tom Wright (CPA)
Cowper	Country	**John Cusack**	**Earle Page** (CP)	Tom Roach	
Dalley	Labor	**Ted Theodore**	Sidney Massey (UAP)	Sol Rosevear	William Little (Ind Nat); Jack Sylvester (CPA)
Darling	Labor	**Arthur Blakeley**	Harold Campbell (CP)	Richard Quintrell	Ted Tripp (CPA)
East Sydney	Labor	George Buckland	John Clasby (UAP)	**Eddie Ward**	
Eden-Monaro	Labor	Gerald O'Sullivan	Arthur Christian (CP); John Perkins* (UAP)		
Gwydir	Labor	**Lou Cunningham**	Aubrey Abbott* (CP); Arnold Brown (CP)	Edward Cummins	
Hume	Labor	**Parker Moloney**	Thomas Collins (CP)	Lynden Regan	
Hunter	Labor	Allan Howie		**Rowley James**	Arnold Bailey (Ind); Harris Burnham (CPA)
Lang	Labor	**William Long**	Alfred Bennett (UAP); Dick Dein* (UAP)	Dan Mulcahy	
Macquarie	Labor	**Ben Chifley**	John Lawson (UAP)	Tony Luchetti	Robert Deveney (CPA)
Martin	Labor	James Catts	Mac Abbott (UAP); William Holman* (UAP)	Charles Hankin	
New England	Country		**Victor Thompson** (CP)		Angus Campbell (Ind)
Newcastle	Labor	**David Watkins**		James Kidd	Rowland Clark (AAL); Jack Simpson (CPA); Walter Skelton (Ind Lab)
North Sydney	Independent; Nationalist		Norman Cowper (UAP); **Billy Hughes*** (UAP)	Norman Nelson	
Parkes	United Australia	William Gibbs	**Charles Marr** (UAP)	Herbert Garden	
Parramatta	Labor	**Albert Rowe**	Frederick Stewart (UAP)	Valentine Patterson	Anwoth Brown (Ind)
Reid	Labor	**Percy Coleman**	Robert Uebel (UAP)	Joe Gander	
Richmond	Country		Robert Gibson (CP); **Roland Green*** (CP); Leonard Greening (CP); Percy Tighe (CP)		Jim Fredericks (Ind)
Riverina	Country	Louis Levy	Robert Hankinson (CP); Horace Nock* (CP)	John Heiss	
Robertson	United Australia	Wilfred Turnbull	**Sydney Gardner** (UAP)	Peter Robb	William Fleming (Ind CP)
South Sydney	Labor	**Edward Riley**	John Jennings (UAP)	John Stewart	
Warringah	United Australia		Walter Duncan (UAP); **Archdale Parkhill*** (UAP)		
Wentworth	Independent; Nationalist		Eric Harrison* (UAP); **Walter Marks** (UAP)		
Werriwa	Labor	Ernest Tully	Walter McNicoll* (CP)	**Bert Lazzarini**	Mont Sheppard (Ind AAL)
West Sydney	Labor	James Donaldson	Arthur Butterell (UAP)	**Jack Beasley**	

=== Northern Territory ===
Electorate	Held by	Labor candidate	Independent candidate
Northern Territory	Labor	**Harold Nelson**	William Easton (Ind); John McMillan (Ind Lab)

=== Queensland ===
Electorate	Held by	Labor candidate	Coalition candidate	Other candidates
Brisbane	United Australia	George Lawson	**Donald Cameron** (UAP)	Hugh Talty (LL)
Capricornia	Labor	**Frank Forde**	Robert Staines (CP)	
Darling Downs	United Australia		**Arthur Morgan** (UAP)	Sir Littleton Groom* (Ind); Herbert Yeates (Ind)
Herbert	Labor	**George Martens**	Grosvenor Francis (UAP)	
Kennedy	Labor	**Darby Riordan**	Jim Clarke (UAP)	
Lilley	United Australia		**George Mackay** (UAP)	Alexander Costello (Ind Lab); Frank Mason (SC)
Maranoa	Country	Myles Ferricks	**James Hunter** (CP)	
Moreton	United Australia		**Josiah Francis** (UAP)	
Oxley	United Australia	Francis Baker	**James Bayley** (UAP)	Frank Pforr (LL)
Wide Bay	Country		**Bernard Corser** (CP)	

=== South Australia ===
Electorate	Held by	Labor candidate	EC candidate	Other candidates
Adelaide	Labor	**George Edwin Yates**	Fred Stacey	Agnes Goode (Ind); Tom Howard (LL); Crawford Vaughan (L-L); John Zwolsman (CPA)
Angas	Labor	David Fraser	**Moses Gabb**	
Barker	Emergency	Cyril Hasse	**Malcolm Cameron**	Percy Spehr (Ind)
Boothby	Labor	Cecil Skitch	**John Price**	Sam Lindsay (ST)
Grey	Labor	**Andrew Lacey**	Philip McBride	Alfred Barns (Ind); James Hodgson (ST)
Hindmarsh	Labor	**Norman Makin**	Ernest Evans	Sid O'Flaherty (LL)
Wakefield	Emergency		**Charles Hawker**	Maurice Collins (Ind CP)

=== Tasmania ===
Electorate	Held by	Labor candidate	UAP candidate	Other candidates
Bass	Labor	Claude Barnard	**Allan Guy**	Harold Solomon (Nat)
Darwin	United Australia	Joseph McGrath	**George Bell**	
Denison	Labor	**Charles Culley**	Arthur Hutchin	
Franklin	Labor	**Charles Frost**	Archibald Blacklow	Albert Beard (Ind)
Wilmot	Labor	George Becker	**Joseph Lyons**	George Pullen (Nat)

=== Victoria ===
Electorate	Held by	Labor candidate	Coalition candidate	Other candidates
Balaclava	United Australia	Edward Stewart	**Thomas White** (UAP)	James Denyer (ADP)
Ballaarat	Labor	Stewart Miller	Henry Bromfield (CP); **Charles McGrath*** (UAP)	
Batman	Labor	**Frank Brennan**	Samuel Dennis (UAP)	Frank Blake (ADP); Jim Hannan (CPA)
Bendigo	Labor	**Richard Keane**	Eric Harrison (UAP)	
Bourke	Labor	**Frank Anstey**	Roy Ivey (UAP)	James Adie (CPA); Walter Norman (Ind)
Corangamite	Labor	**Richard Crouch**	William Gibson (CP)	
Corio	Labor	**Arthur Lewis**	Richard Casey (UAP)	John Lister (Ind UAP)
Echuca	Country		**William Hill** (CP)	John Fitzpatrick (Ind UAP); William Moss (Ind CP); Galloway Stewart (Ind CP)
Fawkner	Independent; Nationalist	John McKenna	**George Maxwell** (UAP)	David Robertson (Ind)
Flinders	Labor	Arthur Haywood	Stanley Bruce (UAP)	
Gippsland	Country		**Thomas Paterson** (CP)	
Henty	United Australia	Fred Katz	**Henry Gullett** (UAP)	
Indi	Labor	**Paul Jones**	William Hutchinson* (UAP); Arthur Walter (CP)	
Kooyong	United Australia	Cornelius Loughnan	**John Latham** (UAP)	
Maribyrnong	Labor	William Beckett	**James Fenton** (UAP)	William Scott (ADP)
Melbourne	Labor	**William Maloney**	Israel Smith (UAP)	
Melbourne Ports	Labor	**Jack Holloway**	William Orr (UAP)	Thomas Houston (LL); William Howey (Ind UAP); Noble Kerby (Ind); Thomas le Huray (CPA)
Wannon	Labor	**John McNeill**	Arthur Rodgers (CP); Thomas Scholfield* (UAP)	
Wimmera	CPP		Samuel Lockhart (CP); William McCann (CP); Hugh McClelland* (CP); William Morgan (UAP)	Alexander Dowsley (Ind)
Yarra	Labor	**James Scullin**	John Davis (UAP)	Patrick Branagan (ST); Ernie Thornton (CPA)

=== Western Australia ===
Electorate	Held by	Labor candidate	Coalition candidate	Other candidates
Forrest	Country		**John Prowse** (CP)	
Fremantle	Labor	**John Curtin**	Keith Watson (UAP)	William Watson (Ind)
Kalgoorlie	Labor	**Albert Green**	William Pickering (CP); George Rainsford (UAP)	
Perth	United Australia	John Moloney	**Walter Nairn** (UAP)	
Swan	Country	John Fraser	**Henry Gregory** (CP)	Carlyle Ferguson (Ind); Alfred Reynolds (Ind CP)

== Senate ==
Sitting Senators are shown in bold text. Tickets that elected at least one Senator are highlighted in the relevant colour. Successful candidates are identified by an asterisk (*).

=== New South Wales ===
Three seats were up for election. The United Australia Party was defending three seats. Labor Senator John Dooley and NSW Labor Senators James Dunn and Arthur Rae were not up for re-election.

Labor candidates	Coalition candidates	Lang Labor candidates	Other candidates
John Bailey; Hilton Blackburn; Albert Gardiner	**Charles Cox*** (UAP); **Walter Massy-Greene*** (UAP); Charles Hardy* (CP)	Christopher Anderson; Tom Arthur; Ernest Barker	James Dooley (Ind Lab); George McDonald (Ind); Lance Sharkey (CPA); Abraham Taylor (Ind)

=== Queensland ===
Three seats were up for election. The United Australia Party-Country Party Coalition was defending three seats. United Australia Party Senators Thomas Crawford, Harry Foll and Matthew Reid were not up for re-election.

Labor candidates	Coalition candidates	Other candidates
Gordon Brown*; Joe Collings*; John MacDonald*	**Walter Cooper** (CP); **Sir William Glasgow** (UAP); **William Thompson** (UAP)	Fred Paterson (CPA)

=== South Australia ===
Three seats were up for election. The Emergency Committee of South Australia was defending three seats. Labor Senators John Daly, Bert Hoare and Mick O'Halloran were not up for re-election.

Labor candidates	EC candidates	Independent candidates
**Harry Kneebone**; John Verran; Frederick Ward	Oliver Badman*; Jack Duncan-Hughes*; **Alexander McLachlan***	Raphael A. Cilento; Ruth Ravenscroft

=== Tasmania ===
Three seats were up for election. The United Australia Party was defending three seats. United Australia Party Senators John Hayes, Herbert Hays and James Ogden were not up for re-election.

Labor candidates	UAP candidates
Thomas Jude; David O'Keefe; Walter Woods	Andrew Cooper; James Counsel; Bayard Edgell; Syd Jackson; **John Millen***; **Herbert Payne***; Benjamin Pearsall; Herbert Postle; **Burford Sampson***

=== Victoria ===
Three seats were up for election. The United Australia Party was defending three seats. Labor Senator John Barnes, United Australia Party Senator Harry Lawson and Country Party Senator Robert Elliott were not up for re-election.

Labor candidates	UAP candidates	Other candidates
Don Cameron; Jim Sheehan; Alf Wallis	**Tom Brennan***; **James Guthrie***; **William Plain***	Alured Kelly (Ind Nat); William Murchison (Ind UAP); Harold Partridge (CPA)

=== Western Australia ===
Three seats were up for election. The United Australia Party-Country Party Coalition was defending three seats. United Australia Party Senators Sir Hal Colebatch and Walter Kingsmill and Country Party Senator Bertie Johnston were not up for re-election.

Labor candidates	Coalition candidates	Other candidates
George Gaunt; Louis Greive; Ted Needham	**William Carroll*** (CP); **Patrick Lynch*** (UAP); **Sir George Pearce*** (UAP)	Findlay MacKay (CPA); John Thomson (Ind CP)

== See also ==
- 1931 Australian federal election
- Members of the Australian House of Representatives, 1929–1931
- Members of the Australian House of Representatives, 1931–1934
- Members of the Australian Senate, 1929–1932
- Members of the Australian Senate, 1932–1935
- List of political parties in Australia
