= Results of the 1931 Victorian local elections =

This is a list of local government area results for the 1931 Victorian local elections.

== Blackburn and Mitcham ==
=== Blackburn by-election ===
1931 Victorian local elections: Blackburn by-election
| Party | Candidate | Votes | % | ±% |
|---|---|---|---|---|
| Independent | John Pape | 684 | 64.59 | |
| Vigilance League | Albert Edwards | 375 | 35.41 | |
| Total formal votes | | 1,059 | | |
| Independent win | | Swing | | |

== Braybrook ==
=== Central ===
1931 Victorian local elections: Central Riding
| Party | Candidate | Votes | % | ±% |
|---|---|---|---|---|
| Independent | R. A. Garde | 397 | 57.05 | |
| Independent | G. Penrose | 299 | 42.95 | |
| Total formal votes | | 696 | | |
| Independent win | | Swing | | |

=== River ===
1931 Victorian local elections: River Riding
| Party | Candidate | Votes | % | ±% |
|---|---|---|---|---|
| Independent | W. Dempster | 729 | 80.19 | |
| Independent | W. J. Dawson | 180 | 19.81 | |
| Total formal votes | | 909 | | |
| Independent win | | Swing | | |

=== Western ===
1931 Victorian local elections: Western Riding
| Party | Candidate | Votes | % | ±% |
|---|---|---|---|---|
| Independent | G. W. Pennell | 284 | 74.16 | |
| Independent | A. S. Diggins | 99 | 25.84 | |
| Total formal votes | | 383 | | |
| Independent win | | Swing | | |

== Brunswick ==
=== North-East ===
1931 Victorian local elections: North-East Ward
| Party | Candidate | Votes | % | ±% |
|---|---|---|---|---|
| Independent | F. Dunstan | 1,251 | 83.01 | |
| Unemployed Association | R. G. Jeffrey | 256 | 16.99 | |
| Total formal votes | | 1,507 | | |
| Independent hold | | Swing | | |

=== North-West ===
1931 Victorian local elections: North-West Ward
| Party | Candidate | Votes | % | ±% |
|---|---|---|---|---|
| Independent | W. P. Jacobs | 1,083 | 58.41 | |
| Labor | A. D. Reaburn | 771 | 41.59 | |
| Total formal votes | | 1,854 | | |
| Independent gain from Labor | | Swing | | |

=== South-East ===
1931 Victorian local elections: South-East Ward
| Party | Candidate | Votes | % | ±% |
|---|---|---|---|---|
| Australian Liberal | Roderick McSolvin | 1,385 | 72.47 | |
| Unemployed Association | J. J. G. Waters | 526 | 27.53 | |
| Total formal votes | | 1,911 | | |
| Australian Liberal win | | Swing | | |

=== South-West ===
1931 Victorian local elections: South-West Ward
| Party | Candidate | Votes | % | ±% |
|---|---|---|---|---|
| Labor | J. E. Hudson | 859 | 42.72 | |
| Independent | H. W. S. Jones | 674 | 33.52 | |
| Independent | W. J. Granger | 478 | 23.76 | |
| Total formal votes | | 2,011 | | |
Two-candidate-preferred result
| Independent | H. W. S. Jones | 1,012 | 50.52 | |
| Labor | J. E. Hudson | 991 | 49.48 | |
| Independent gain from Labor | | Swing | | |

== Richmond ==
=== East ===
1931 Victorian local elections: East Ward
| Party | Candidate | Votes | % | ±% |
|---|---|---|---|---|
| Labor | Geoffrey O'Connell | 599 | 82.17 | |
| Communist | C. H. Frank | 130 | 17.83 | |
| Total formal votes | | 729 | | |
| Labor hold | | Swing | | |

=== North ===
1931 Victorian local elections: North Ward
| Party | Candidate | Votes | % | ±% |
|---|---|---|---|---|
| Labor | R. H. Lightfoot | 879 | 61.00 | |
| Independent | W. L. Podmore | 562 | 39.00 | |
| Total formal votes | | 1,441 | | |
| Labor hold | | Swing | | |
