= 1931 Victorian local elections =

- 27 August 1931
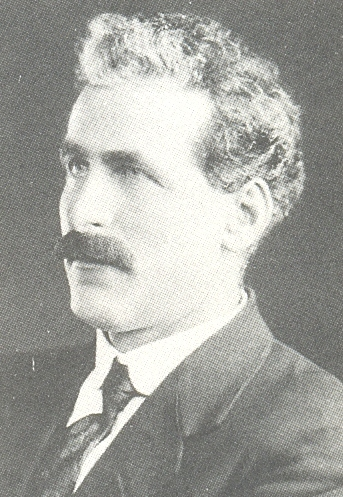

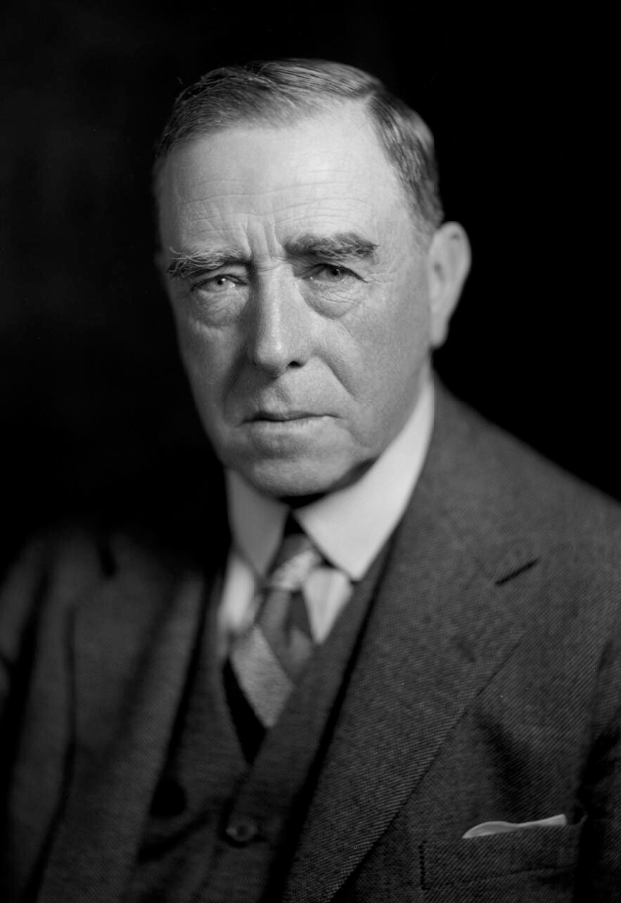

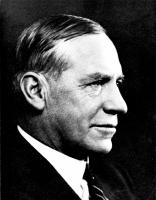

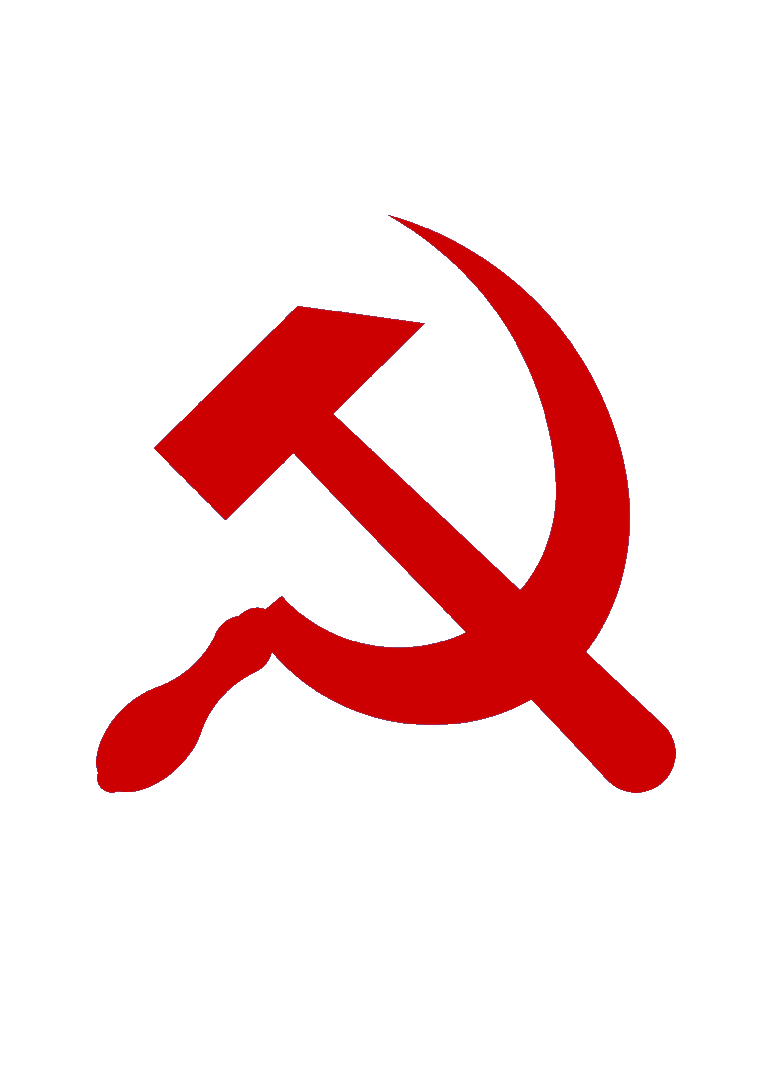
	First party	Second party	Third party
	IND
Leader	N/A	Edmond Hogan	Stanley Argyle
Party	Independents	Labor	Nationalist
Last election	(Note: This only includes the council seats up for election in 1931.)	10	2
Seats before		8	2
Seats won	150	2	3
Seat change		▼6	▲1
Popular vote	119,854	13,234	5,829
Percentage	79.22%	8.75%	3.85%
	Fourth party	Fifth party	Sixth party
	REF	AFAL
Leader	No leader	Alexander Gibson	Murray Bourchier
Party	Reform Movement	All for Australia	Country
Last election	0	Did not exist	0
Seats before	0	0	0
Seats won	1	0	0
Seat change	▲1	Steady	Steady
Popular vote	272	272	135
Percentage	0.95%	0.18%	0.09%
Swing	▲0.95	▲0.18
	Seventh party
Leader	No leader
Party	Communist
Last election	0
Seats before	0
Seats won	0
Seat change	Steady
Popular vote	130
Percentage	0.09%

The 1931 Victorian local elections were held on 27 August 1931 to elect the councils of 100 of the local government areas in Victoria, Australia. A number of by-elections were also held to fill extraordinary vacancies.

Until the 1994 reforms introduced by the Kennett state government, all local elections were staggered, with not all councillors up for election each year.

== Background ==
Labor went into the local elections with eight sitting councillors, after A. Pollock (Collingwood) and J. Ryan (Port Melbourne) failed to secure party endorsement for re-election. The party ran a total of 19 candidates − 17 in the Greater Melbourne area and two in Wonthaggi.

Before the elections, the federal Nationalist Party merged with a group of defectors from the Labor who supported Joseph Lyons, and formed the United Australia Party. However, the Nationalist name continued to be used for the party's state branch until after the local elections when the name formally changed on 15 September 1931.

A number of local parties contested the elections. Additionally, the All for Australia League contested its first elections, having been formed several months prior in January 1931.

== Results ==
Party	Votes	%	Swing	Seats	Change
Independents	119,854	79.22		150	
Labor	13,234	8.75		2	▼8
Nationalist	5,829	3.85		3	▲1
Progressive Ratepayers	3,025	2.00		4	▲4
Port Melbourne Progressives	2,329	1.54		2	▲2
Returned Soldiers	1,480	0.98		1	▲1
Reform Movement	1,431	0.95	+0.95	1	▲1
Independent Labor	960	0.63		0	Steady
Preston Progressives	836	0.55		1	▲1
Unemployed Association	782	0.52		0	Steady
East Oakleigh Improvement	386	0.26		0	Steady
Vigilance League	375	0.25	+0.25	0	Steady
All for Australia	272	0.18	+0.18	0	Steady
Chelsea Ratepayers	217	0.14		0	Steady
Country	135	0.09		0	Steady
Communist	130	0.09		0	Steady
Total	151,275	100.0		165	

== Aftermath ==
Labor suffered losses in Brunswick, Coburg, Collingwood, Footscray, Heidelberg, Port Melbourne and Williamstown.

Four female candidates contested the elections − Ethel Blagdon (Hawthorn), Marie Dalley (Kew), Jennie Baines (Port Melbourne) and Violet Lambert (Fern Tree Gully). Lambert was elected in South Riding, defeating sitting councillor J. Hobbs with 74.04% of the vote.
