= Mowbray House =

Mowbray House School
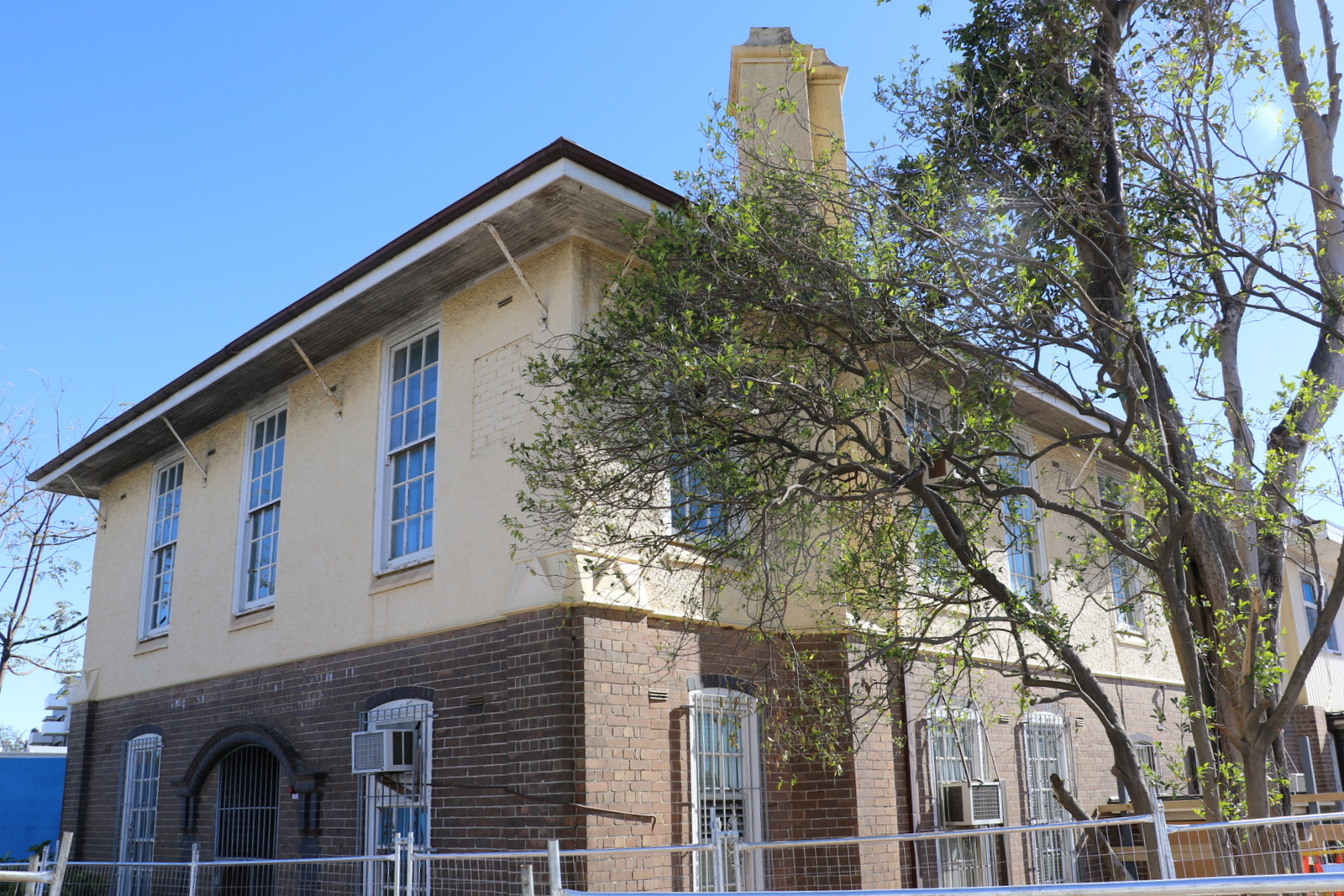

Location
- 339 Mowbray Road, Chatswood, Sydney, New South Wales; Australia
- Coordinates: 33°48′16″S 151°10′50″E

Information
- Type: Independent, day and boarding school
- Established: 1906
- Founder: Lancelot Bavin (Founding headmaster)
- Status: Closed
- Closed: 1954
- Key people: Sandy Phillips (Co-headmaster)

Mowbray House is a heritage-listed historic building that was an independent, day and boarding school for boys, located in Chatswood, on the North Shore of Sydney, New South Wales, Australia. More recently, it was part of an Ausgrid depot site. The school buildings included a chapel that is now the Holy Trinity Anglican Church. The building is listed on the local government heritage register.

== History ==
Lancelot Bavin as headmaster.

The school was opened in 1906 as the Chatswood Preparatory School by Lancelot Bavin (1881–1956), who would later be an alderman (1925–1932) and three-term Mayor (1927–1930) of Willoughby at the start of the Great Depression. Bavin initially ran the school with his wife, Ida, and his mother, Emma (1845–1931), the widow of Methodist Minister the Rev. Rainsford Bavin (1845–1905). In 1914 Sandy Phillips, until then a master at Sydney Grammar School, became co-headmaster with Bavin and the institution became known as Mowbray House School. Phillips remained at Mowbray House until his return to Sydney Grammar in 1924, where he ultimately became Headmaster. Bavin continued as Headmaster of Mowbray House until the school closed in 1954 due to his ill-health.

Several notable Australians received primary education at Mowbray House School, including Norman Lethbridge Cowper in its first few years, Kenneth Slessor from 1910 to 1914, and Gough Whitlam in the early 1920s.

In the late 20th century and until 2016, Mowbray House was part of an Ausgrid depot site. It was then acquired by Transport for New South Wales. As of December 2017, a planned tunnel entrance for the Sydney Metro was nearby, and the John Holland Group was preparing the building to be office space for the construction project.

== Buildings ==
Mowbray House was built in 1906 and is a two-storey tuck pointed face brick building with a hipped tile roof and cream cement render on the upper level. It is in the Federation Arts and Crafts style, with regular multi-paned windows and a symmetrical form. The building has timber eave brackets and unusual corner chimneys. It originally contained a dormitory accommodating twenty-five boarding students. In 1917, a dining room was added to the northern end of building, and modifications to the kitchen and eastern façade were made.

In 1874 the Mechanics' Institute built a School of Arts on the site. From 1878 until 1903, Willoughby Council used the ashlar sandstone building as its council chambers. The building became the school chapel in 1906. In 1957, due to public pressure, the Sydney County Council took possession of the site, and the building was dismantled and relocated stone-by-stone to 44 Beaconsfield Road, Chatswood, where it is now Holy Trinity Anglican Church.

== See also ==
- List of non-government schools in New South Wales
- Education in Australia
