= Members of the Australian Senate, 1932–1935 =

Senate composition at 1 July 1932
Government (26) - (8 seat majority)
United Australia Party (22)
Country Party (4)

Opposition (8)
Labor (8)

Crossbench (2)
Lang Labor (2)

This is a list of members of the Australian Senate from 1932 to 1935. Half of its members were elected at the 17 November 1928 election and had terms starting on 1 July 1929 and finishing on 30 June 1935; the other half were elected at the 19 December 1931 election and had terms starting on 1 July 1932 and finishing on 30 June 1938. The process for filling casual vacancies was complex. While senators were elected for a six-year term, people appointed to a casual vacancy only held office until the earlier of the next election for the House of Representatives or the Senate.

Senator	Party	State	Term ending	Years in office
Oliver Badman	United Australia	South Australia	1938	1932–1937
John Barnes	Labor	Victoria	1935	1913–1920, 1923–1935
Tom Brennan	United Australia	Victoria	1938	1931–1938
Gordon Brown	Labor	Queensland	1938	1932–1965
William Carroll	Country	Western Australia	1938	1926–1936
Hal Colebatch (Note: UAP Senator Hal Colebatch resigned on 20 March 1933 to become Western Australian Agent-General in London; UAP member Herbert Collett was appointed to replace him on 6 April with his term expiring at the September 1934 election, when he was re-elected for the balance of the term expiring on 30 June 1935 and a six year term expiring on 30 June 1941.)	United Australia	Western Australia	1935	1929–1933
Herbert Collett	United Australia	Western Australia	1934, (Note: Appointed to a casual vacancy and only held office until the earlier of the next election for the House of Representatives or the Senate.) 1935	1933–1947
Joe Collings	Labor	Queensland	1938	1932–1950
Charles Cox	United Australia	New South Wales	1938	1920–1938
Thomas Crawford	United Australia	Queensland	1935	1917–1947
John Daly	Labor	South Australia	1935	1928–1935
John Dooley	Labor	New South Wales	1935	1928–1935
Jack Duncan-Hughes	United Australia	South Australia	1938	1931–38
James Dunn	Lang Labor (Note: Elected as a Labor member but walked out of the party with the split in March 1931 and sat as a member of Lang Labor.)	New South Wales	1935	1929–1935
Robert Elliott	Country	Victoria	1935	1929–1935
Harry Foll	United Australia	Queensland	1935	1917–1947
Charles Grant (Note: UAP Senator Charles Grant was appointed to a casual vacancy on 3 March 1932 with his term expiring at the September 1934 election, when he was re-elected for the balance of the term expiring on 30 June 1935 and a six year term expiring on 30 June 1941.)	United Australia	Tasmania	1934, 1935	1925, 1932–1941
James Guthrie	United Australia	Victoria	1938	1920–1938
Charles Hardy	Country	New South Wales	1938	1932–1938
John Hayes	United Australia	Tasmania	1935	1923–1947
Herbert Hays	United Australia	Tasmania	1935	1923–1947
Bert Hoare	Labor	South Australia	1935	1922–1935
Bertie Johnston	Country	Western Australia	1935	1929–1942
Walter Kingsmill (Note: UAP Senator Walter Kingsmill died on 15 January 1935; UAP candidate Allan MacDonald was elected at the 15 September 1934 election for a six-year term due to start on 1 July 1935; he was appointed to replace Kingsmill on 5 March for the remainder of his term finishing on 30 June 1935.)	United Australia	Western Australia	1935	1923–1935
Harry Lawson	United Australia	Victoria	1935	1929–1935
Patrick Lynch	United Australia	Western Australia	1938	1907–1938
Allan MacDonald	United Australia	Western Australia	1935	1935–1947
John MacDonald	Labor	Queensland	1938	1922, 1928, 1932–1937
Walter Massy-Greene	United Australia	New South Wales	1938	1923–1925, 1926–1938
Alexander McLachlan	United Australia	South Australia	1938	1926–1944
John Millen	United Australia	Tasmania	1938	1920–1938
Mick O'Halloran	Labor	South Australia	1935	1928–1935
Herbert Payne	United Australia	Tasmania	1938	1920–1938
Sir George Pearce (Note: Father of the Senate)	United Australia	Western Australia	1938	1901–1938
William Plain	United Australia	Victoria	1938	1917–1923, 1925–1938
Arthur Rae	Lang Labor	New South Wales	1935	1910–1914, 1929–1935
Matthew Reid	United Australia	Queensland	1935	1917–1935
Burford Sampson	United Australia	Tasmania	1938	1925–1938, 1941–1947
