= Members of the Australian House of Representatives, 1931–1934 =

This is a list of the members of the Australian House of Representatives in the 13th Australian Parliament, which was elected at the 1931 election on 19 December 1931. The incumbent Australian Labor Party led by Prime Minister of Australia James Scullin was defeated by the newly formed opposition United Australia Party (descended from the Nationalist Party of Australia) led by ex-Labor Joseph Lyons with coalition partner the Country Party led by Earle Page.

Member	Party	Electorate	State	In office
Aubrey Abbott	Country	Gwydir	NSW	1925–1929, 1931–1937
Frank Anstey	Labor	Bourke	Vic	1910–1934
Frank Baker	Labor	Oxley	Qld	1931–1939
Jack Beasley	Lang Labor	West Sydney	NSW	1928–1946
George Bell	United Australia	Darwin	Tas	1919–1922, 1925–1943
Archibald Blacklow	United Australia	Franklin	Tas	1931–1934
Arthur Blakeley	Labor	Darling	NSW	1917–1934
Stanley Bruce	United Australia	Flinders	Vic	1918–1929, 1931–1933
Malcolm Cameron	United Australia	Barker	SA	1922–1934
Richard Casey	United Australia	Corio	Vic	1931–1940, 1949–1960
John Clasby	United Australia	East Sydney	NSW	1931–1932
Thomas Collins	Country	Hume	NSW	1931–1943
Bernard Corser	Country	Wide Bay	Qld	1928–1954
Dick Dein	United Australia	Lang	NSW	1931–1934, 1935–1941 (S)
Samuel Dennis	United Australia	Batman	Vic	1931–1934
James Fairbairn	United Australia	Flinders	Vic	1933–1940
James Fenton	United Australia	Maribyrnong	Vic	1910–1934
Frank Forde	Labor	Capricornia	Qld	1922–1946
Josiah Francis	United Australia	Moreton	Qld	1922–1955
Moses Gabb	Independent	Angas	SA	1919–1925, 1929–1934
Joe Gander	Lang Labor	Reid	NSW	1931–1940
Sydney Gardner	United Australia	Robertson	NSW	1922–1940
William Gibson	Country	Corangamite	Vic	1918–1929, 1931–1934
Albert Green	Labor	Kalgoorlie	WA	1922–1940
Roland Green	Country	Richmond	NSW	1922–1937
Henry Gregory	Country	Swan	WA	1913–1940
Sir Littleton Groom	Independent/UAP	Darling Downs	Qld	1901–1929, 1931–1936
Sir Henry Gullett	United Australia	Henty	Vic	1925–1940
Allan Guy	United Australia	Bass	Tas	1929–1934, 1940–1946
Eric Fairweather Harrison	United Australia	Bendigo	Vic	1931–1937
Eric Harrison	United Australia	Wentworth	NSW	1931–1956
Charles Hawker	United Australia	Wakefield	SA	1929–1938
William Hill	Country	Echuca	Vic	1919–1934
Jack Holloway	Labor	Melbourne Ports	Vic	1929–1951
William Holman	United Australia	Martin	NSW	1931–1934
Billy Hughes	United Australia	North Sydney	NSW	1901–1952
James Hunter	Country	Maranoa	Qld	1921–1940
Arthur Hutchin	United Australia	Denison	Tas	1931–1934
William Hutchinson	United Australia	Indi	Vic	1931–1949
Rowley James	Lang Labor	Hunter	NSW	1928–1958
John Jennings	United Australia	South Sydney	NSW	1931–1940
Albert Lane	United Australia	Barton	NSW	1931–1940
John Latham	United Australia	Kooyong	Vic	1922–1934
George Lawson	Labor	Brisbane	Qld	1931–1961
John Lawson	United Australia	Macquarie	NSW	1931–1940
Joseph Lyons	United Australia	Wilmot	Tas	1929–1939
George Mackay	United Australia	Lilley	Qld	1917–1934
Norman Makin	Labor	Hindmarsh	SA	1919–1946, 1954–1963
William Maloney	Labor	Melbourne	Vic	1904–1940
Charles Marr	United Australia	Parkes	NSW	1919–1929, 1931–1943
George Martens	Labor	Herbert	Qld	1928–1946
George Maxwell	United Australia	Fawkner	Vic	1917–1935
Philip McBride	United Australia	Grey	SA	1931–1937, 1937–1943 (S), 1946–1958
Hugh McClelland	Country	Wimmera	Vic	1931–1937
Charles McGrath	United Australia	Ballaarat	Vic	1913–1919, 1920–1934
Walter McNicoll	United Country	Werriwa	NSW	1931–1934
Walter Nairn	United Australia	Perth	WA	1929–1943
Harold George Nelson	Labor	Northern Territory	NT	1922–1934
Horace Nock	Country	Riverina	NSW	1931–1940
Sir Earle Page	Country	Cowper	NSW	1919–1961
Archdale Parkhill	United Australia	Warringah	NSW	1927–1937
Thomas Paterson	Country	Gippsland	Vic	1922–1943
John Perkins	United Australia	Eden-Monaro	NSW	1926–1929, 1931–1943
John Price	United Australia	Boothby	SA	1928–1941
John Prowse	Country	Forrest	WA	1919–1943
Edward Charles Riley	Labor	Cook	NSW	1922–1934
Darby Riordan	Labor	Kennedy	Qld	1929–1936
Sol Rosevear	Lang Labor	Dalley	NSW	1931–1953
Thomas Scholfield	United Australia	Wannon	Vic	1931–1940
James Scullin	Labor	Yarra	Vic	1910–1913, 1922–1949
Fred Stacey	United Australia	Adelaide	SA	1931–1943
Frederick Stewart	United Australia	Parramatta	NSW	1931–1946
Victor Thompson	Country	New England	NSW	1922–1940
Harold Thorby	Country	Calare	NSW	1931–1940
Eddie Ward	Lang Labor	East Sydney	NSW	1931, 1932–1963
David Watkins	Labor	Newcastle	NSW	1901–1935
William Watson	Independent	Fremantle	WA	1922–1928, 1931–1934
Thomas White	United Australia	Balaclava	Vic	1929–1951
