= Alfred Bennett (broadcaster) =

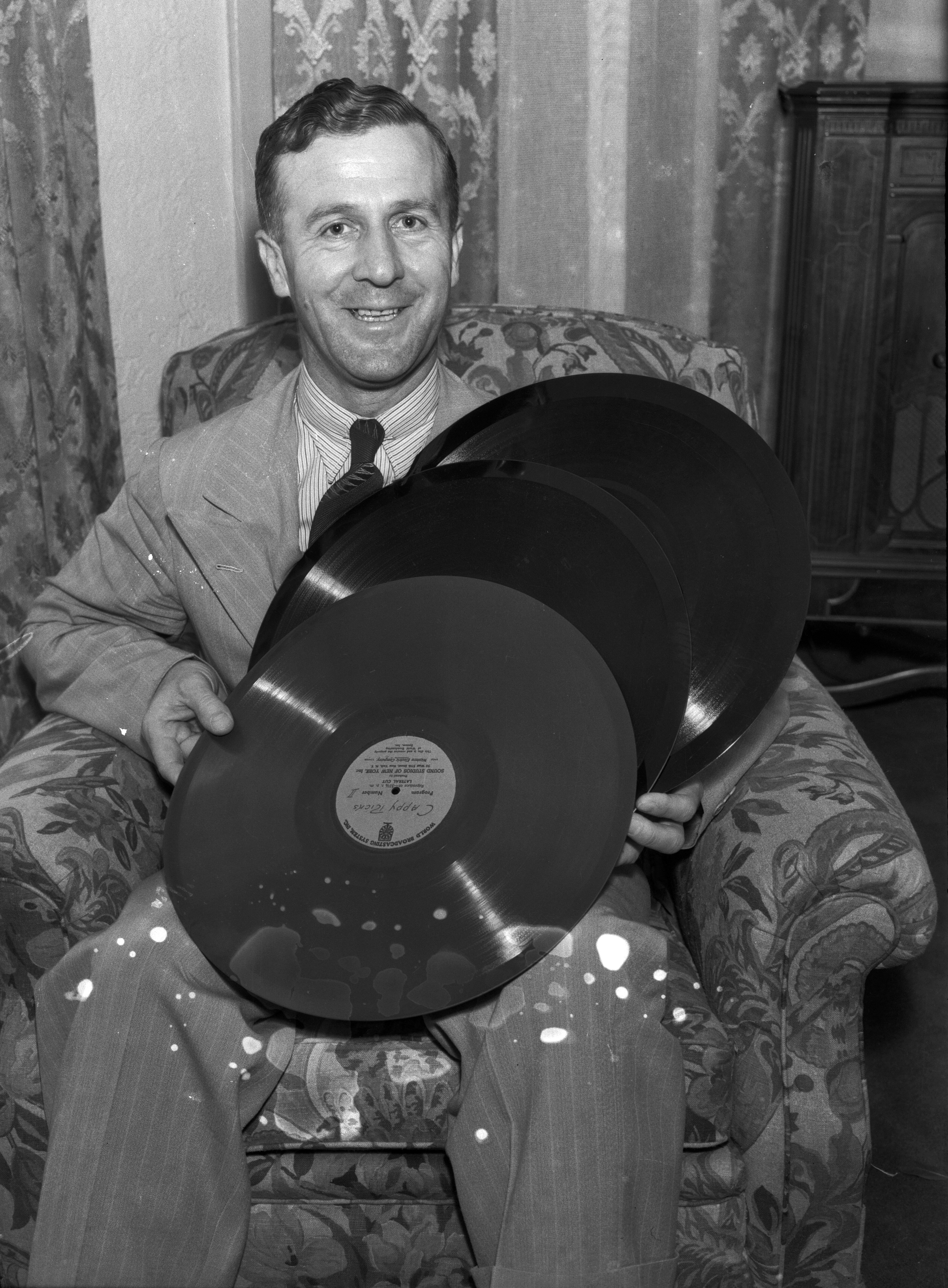
- Bennett in 1935
- Born: 26 September 1889; Melbourne, Australia
- Died: 17 April 1963 (aged 73)
- Occupation: Broadcasting Executive
- Known for: Manager of 2GB

Alfred Edward Bennett (26 September 1889 – 17 April 1963) was an Australian broadcasting executive, active in both the radio and film industries

== Biography ==
Bennett was born in Balwyn, Victoria, to schoolmaster George Jesse Bennett and Harriet Ann, née Bentley, he attended Balwyn State School and Hawthorn College before becoming secretary of the Freezing Company Ltd. at Murtoa. On 11 June 1912 he married Ruby Adelaide Fraunfelder at St James Old Cathedral in Melbourne, moving to Shepparton the following year to become secretary of Goulburn Valley Industries Co. Ltd. After spending several years managing at meatworks in Carnarvon, Western Australia, he moved to Sydney in 1922 to become an accountant and in 1926 was appointed manager of the Theosophical Society's radio station 2GB. In 1929 Bennett and George Arundale founded the Who's for Australia? League and served as president until 1931, when his brother Gordon Bennett succeeded him. An open admirer of Benito Mussolini, Bennett ran for the Australian House of Representatives in the 1931 federal election as a United Australia Party candidate for the seat of Lang, but was unsuccessful.

Bennett travelled to the United States twice in the 1930s and continued his broadcasting activities. He was president of the Australian Federation of Commercial Broadcasting from 1934 to 1936 and took a stand against government interference, as well as demanding equal status with the Australian Broadcasting Commission. He also directed the stations 3AW in Melbourne and 5DN in Adelaide. He was appointed director of the Theosophical Broadcasting Station Ltd in 1935 and in 1937 won a court case for the rest of his fees after he was asked to resign. He later won a High Court appeal in 1947, which decided that compensation was a capital payment. In his retirement Bennett worked for welfare for children and old men and was general secretary of the Australian Child Welfare Association. He died at the wheel of his car at Vaucluse of coronary vascular disease in 1963 and was cremated.
