= Emergency Committee of South Australia =

1931 South Australian anti-labor union

The Emergency Committee of South Australia was the major anti-Labor grouping in South Australia at the 1931 federal election.

== History ==
The Emergency Committee arose as a consequence of the financial turmoil brought about by the Great Depression in Australia, and was opposed to what it saw as the "financial extremists" in James Scullin's federal Labor government. The Emergency Committee ran in place of the United Australia Party and the Country Party at the national level, with the assistance of the Liberal Federation and the SA Country Party at the state level, and the additional assistance of the Citizens' League, the Political Reform League, and the Producers and Business Men's Political Committee.

== 1931 federal election ==
In the House of Representatives, the Emergency Committee took an additional two seats, Adelaide and Grey, to win six of the state's seven seats. Hindmarsh was the only seat in the state retained by Labor. Originally holding just the two seats of Barker and Wakefield, Labor MP John Price had defected and retained Boothby, while Labor-turned-independent MP Moses Gabb retained Angas with Emergency Committee endorsement. As the Emergency Committee did not run their own candidate in Angas, Gabb was therefore often counted an Emergency Committee MP. However, Gabb remained an independent and neither helped to form or sit with the government. The Emergency Committee's five MPs joined the UAP party room, giving the UAP an outright majority of two seats. UAP leader Joseph Lyons dispensed with the normal Coalition and formed what is to date the last government made up solely of members from the major non-Labor party.

In the bloc-voting winner-take-all Senate, the Emergency Committee received a higher vote than Labor in South Australia and therefore won the three state seats up for election.

== Legacy ==
The overwhelming success of the Emergency Committee's federal candidates in 1931 encouraged the Liberal Federation and the SA Country Party to amalgamate in the following year to form the Liberal and Country League (LCL) ahead of the 1933 state election. The LCL (the predecessor of the present-day South Australian Division of the Liberal Party of Australia) won the election and would stay in office until the 1965 state election with the assistance of a pro-LCL electoral malapportionment introduced in 1936, which in time would become known as the Playmander.

== See also ==
- Candidates of the Australian federal election, 1931
