= Norman Lethbridge Cowper =

Australian politician

Sir Norman Lethbridge Cowper (15 September 1896 – 9 September 1987) was an Australian lawyer best known as the Senior Partner of the legal firm of Allen Allen & Hemsley which is now Allens. Under Cowper's leadership, Allen Allen & Hemsley became one of Australia's leading law firms working for many of Australia's biggest corporations and expanded into Asia. His most notable work as a lawyer was his involvement in the successful fight by 11 trading banks against the Chifley Government's bank nationalisation legislation. He was knighted for his contribution to public affairs in 1967.

He also twice stood for Parliament as a candidate of the United Australia Party and was involved in drafting its constitution. Cowper served on the boards of 20 Australian public companies including Borg Warner Australia and Angus & Robertson.

== Early life and career ==
Cowper was born in Chatswood, New South Wales in 1896 into one of NSW's most powerful families. One of his ancestors Sir Charles Cowper was Premier of New South Wales and his father was a prominent solicitor. At the age of 9, he went to Chatswood Preparatory School (later known as Mowbray House School). He went to the Sydney Grammar School where he became a prefect and had a good academic record finishing in 1914.

Cowper then undertook an arts degree at Sydney University finishing in 1917. He then joined the army in 1918 after having been rejected three times earlier due to an enlarged heart due to a bout of rheumatic fever. However, he was discharged for the same reason two months later having never left Australia. After the war, he undertook a law degree graduating with second-class honours in 1923.

== Legal career ==
He started his legal career at Allen, Allen & Helmsley after his admission as a solicitor in 1923. Cowper would work at the firm for over 50 years reaching the rank of senior partner and turning it into one of Australia's leading law firms.

He also held a series of appointments including President of the Law Society of New South Wales and becoming a Foundation Director of the solicitors scheme.

== Political career ==
Cowper was involved with the foundation of the United Australia Party and twice stood as a candidate for Federal Parliament. Together with former Prime Minister of Australia Billy Hughes, he stood for the Division of North Sydney in the 1931 Australian federal election. Cowper performed creditably on primary votes but Hughes won by over 8,000 votes once preferences were distributed. He again contested the Division of Wentworth in the 1940 Australian federal election finishing behind Eric Harrison who was a sitting member and Minister.

== Public affairs ==
Cowper was one of the founders of the Australian Institute of Political Science in 1932 and later became its President. The Norman Cowper lecture has been given annually in his honour since 1982. He also played a leading role in the Australian Institute of International Affairs. He served as president of the Australian Club.

Cowper served as Mabel Freer's solicitor during the controversy over her deportation from Australia for immoral conduct. His writ of habeas corpus was rejected by High Court justice H. V. Evatt.

In a professional capacity he served on a series of investigations and commissions; the first Committee of Enquiry into the Salaries and Allowances of Members of the Commonwealth Parliament (1959). In 1964, he was chairman of the Council on New Guinea Affairs which prepared the way for the independence of Papua New Guinea. The Menzies Government appointed him to the council of the Australian National University in 1955. He was also a member of the National Committee and Editorial Board of the Australian Dictionary of Biography.

Additionally, Sir Norman was a director, and frequently a chairman, of a number of public companies such as BorgWarner Australia and Angus & Robertson.

== Death ==
He died on 9 September 1987, just six days short of his 91st birthday. In his obituary of Cowper in the Sydney Morning Herald, Francis James described him as being "surpassed by none in his breadth and liberality of mind, integrity and undeviating, selfless care for the public interest. Through the growing pains and uncertainties of our nation in this century, he had few equals".
