= Alexander James Gibson =

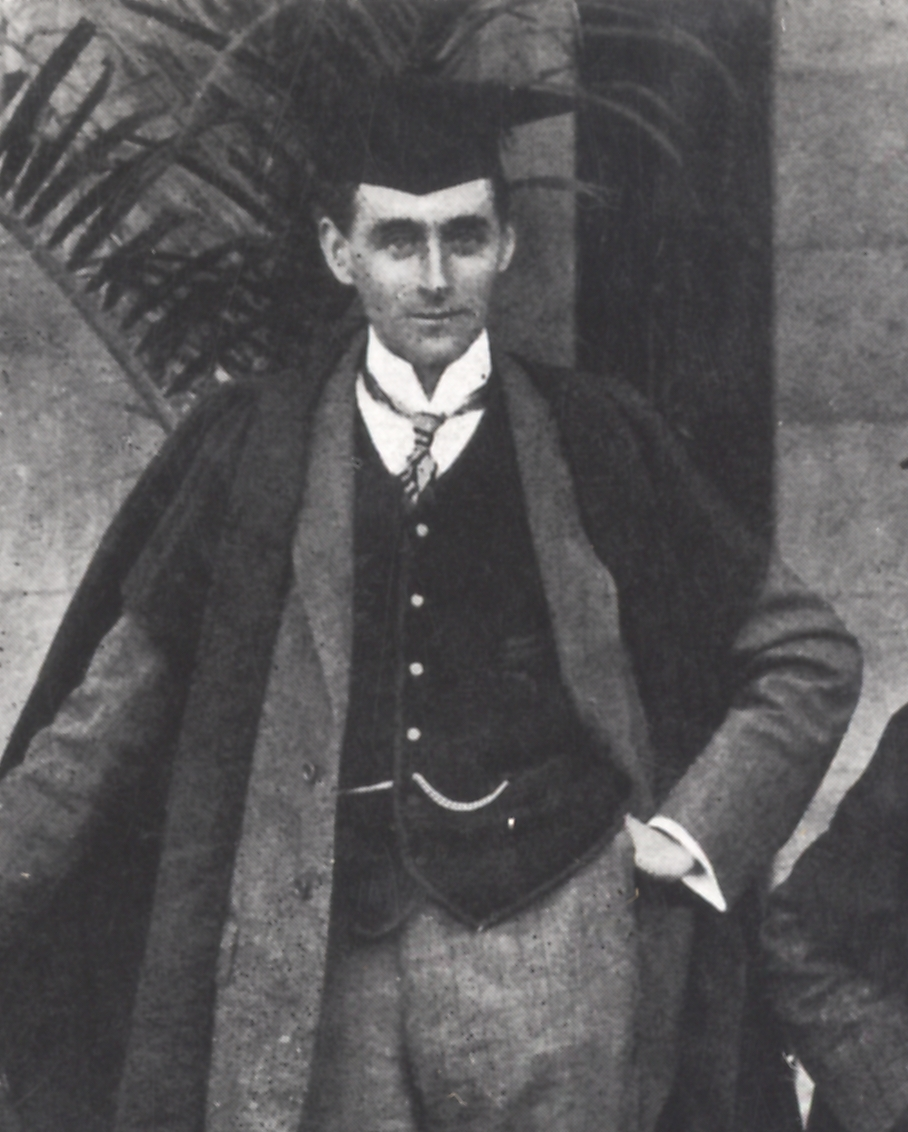
Professor Alexander James Gibson, 3 April 1911

Alexander James Gibson (1876–1960) was the first professor of engineering at the University of Queensland in Brisbane, Queensland, Australia.

Gibson was born on 18 December 1876 at Hanover Square, London, son of Edward Morris Gibson, articled clerk and later solicitor, and his wife Martha, née James.

He was educated at Alleyn's College of God's Gift (Dulwich College) and served an apprenticeship with the Thames Iron Works, Ship Building & Engineering Co. at Blackwall, London.

He was a member of the Queensland Recruiting Committee during World War I. During the Great Depression he was the president of the All for Australia League.
