= Arnold Brown (soldier) =

Australian Army officer

- Born: 22 July 1894; Hunters Hill, New South Wales
- Died: 6 March 1960 (aged 65); Batemans Bay, New South Wales
- Military career
- Allegiance: Australia
- Branch: Australian Army
- Service years: 1915–1919; 1939–1946
- Rank: Lieutenant-Colonel
- Commands: 2nd/1st Pioneer Battalion; 36th Battalion
- Conflicts: First World War; Western Front; Second World War; Western Desert Campaign; New Guinea Campaign; Home Front
- Awards: Distinguished Service Order; Officer of the Order of the British Empire; Military Cross; Mentioned in Despatches (2)

Lieutenant-Colonel Arnold Brown DSO, OBE, MC (22 July 1894 – 6 March 1960) was an Australian Army officer who served in the First and Second World Wars.

== Early life ==
Born on 22 July 1894 at Hunters Hill in Sydney to English immigrants, Brown attended Sydney Grammar School and then Bathurst Experimental Farm before becoming a jackaroo at Condobolin. He later became an overseer at Cobar. He moved to Western Australia in 1914.

== Military career ==
=== First World War ===
Following the outbreak of the First World War, Brown enlisted in the Australian Imperial Force (AIF) on 5 March 1915. He was posted as a sergeant in the 28th Battalion and was sent to Gallipoli. Arriving in September, he remained on the peninsula until evacuation in December. On 12 February 1916 he was commissioned in Egypt, and in March was sent with the battalion to France. He was awarded the Military Cross following his actions at the Battle of Pozières and was promoted captain in September 1916.

In November 1916 Brown was shot through the neck at Flers. After receiving treatment in England, he returned to his battalion in January 1917. In April, he was promoted temporary major. He was awarded the Distinguished Service Order for his actions during the Battle of Bullecourt in May. He was wounded again in September, requiring hospitalisation but returned to the field in February 1918. In April 1919 he returned to Australia and was subsequently discharged from the AIF.

=== Interwar period ===
Returning to civilian life, Brown married Freda Mary Thompson in Sydney on 6 January 1920. As part of the soldier settlement program he began farming near Coonabarabran. He was active in the local community, becoming vice-president of the Coonabarabran sub-branch of the Returned Sailors' and Soldiers' Imperial League of Australia, president of the local Sane Democracy League and a local commander of the New Guard. He contested the 1931 federal election as a Country Party candidate for Gwydir, but was defeated by a second Country candidate, Aubrey Abbott. He was one of the foundation members of the National Defence League of Australia in 1938 (he would later become president of its central council).

=== Second World War ===
After the Second World War broke out, Brown rejoined the AIF and was sent to the Middle East with the 2nd/1st Pioneer Battalion. On 9 March 1941 he was promoted to lieutenant-colonel and he commanded the battalion during its part in the defence of Tobruk. Mentioned in despatches and appointed Officer of the Order of the British Empire in 1942, he was appointed commander of the 36th Battalion, then serving in Papua. He served in this role from May to September, before becoming commander of his previous battalion, now serving in New Guinea. However, his time in this latter command was limited as he became ill and was hospitalised intermittently for five months until March 1943.

Upon his recovery, Brown held administrative positions for the rest of the war in New Guinea, Melbourne, Queensland and Singapore. Following the end of the war he presided over the trials of Japanese war criminals in Darwin, where his leniency caused some controversy.

== Later life ==
Following the end of his service with the AIF on 29 August 1946, Brown took up a farm near Windsor but poor health intervened. His final public position was director of the Immigration Holding Centre at Scheyville in 1949. In 1958 he was classified as totally and permanently incapacitated due to his war service. He died at Batemans Bay in 1960 of ischaemic heart disease, survived by his wife and three children. A son had been killed in service with the AIF during the Second World War.
