= Alf Wallis =

Australian trade unionist (1888–1963)

Alfred Russell Wallis (16 April 1888 – 3 August 1963) was an Australian trade unionist and conciliation commissioner.

Born at North Carlton in Melbourne to carpenter William Wallis and Mary Ann, née Gorman, he attended state schools at Horsham and Moreland before becoming a cutter's apprentice and journeyman. He joined the Victorian Socialist Party (VSP) when he was eighteen, and in 1906 was sent to jail for thirty days for his part in the party's free speech campaign. On his release he joined the Victorian Clothing Operatives' Union and represented it in the Trades Hall Council, also being elected to the VSP's executive. However, the increased stress of these positions led to a breakdown and Wallis retired to the country to recover. He returned to his career in 1908 and 1909 was elected president of the Victorian branch of the Federated Clothing Trades Union of Australia. From 1912 he represented his union at state conferences of the Australian Labor Party.

In 1920 Wallis was appointed secretary of the Clothing Trades Union's Victorian branch and edited its journal, the Clothing Trades Gazette. At Collingwood on 5 March 1921 he married Josephine Wood. Wallis supported the Premiers' Plan and contested the Senate as a Labor candidate in 1931. In 1932 he was elected President of the Victorian Trades Hall Council, and in 1933 he was appointed the workers' delegate to the International Labour Conference in Geneva. In 1934 he was general secretary-treasurer of the Amalgamated Clothing and Allied Trades Union, serving until 1944. A workers' representative on the Women's Employment Board during World War II, Wallis was appointed a Commonwealth conciliation commissioner in 1947 and resigned from his union positions. He retired in 1953 and died at Fitzroy in 1963. Always a controversial figure, Wallis's later career made him enemies among his former union colleagues and his tendency towards prejudice against women and anti-Semitism made him unpopular among the clothing trades.
