= All for Australia League =

- Emblem used on AFAL badges
- President: Alexander James Gibson
- Founded: 28 January 1931
- Dissolved: early 1932
- Merged into: United Australia Party
- Headquarters: Sydney, New South Wales
- Membership (June 1931): 130,000
- Ideology: Anti-establishment
- Political position: Right-wing
- Brighton City Council: 1 / 12 (1931–1932)

The All for Australia League (AFAL) was an Australian political movement during the Great Depression. It was founded in early 1931 and claimed to have amassed 130,000 members by June 1931. Right-wing and anti-establishment in nature, the league had the backing of a number of prominent businessmen and industrialists. It was critical both of the Labor Party and the right-wing Nationalist Party. It primarily operated in Sydney, but also had branches in country New South Wales and absorbed a similar organisation in Victoria. The league eventually chose to co-operate with the existing Nationalist organisation at the 1931 federal election, helping preselect candidates for the new United Australia Party (UAP). After the election victory the league was absorbed by the UAP's state organisation.

== Objectives ==
Five objectives were announced at the official launch of the league, held at Killara on 12 February 1931:

1. To create a unity of purpose amongst citizens and organisations to meet the economic and social crises.
2. To exert constitutional pressure on Governments in support of the following or other necessary measures: (a) Restoration of National Credit, (b) Economy of Governmental administration and expenditure, (c) Balancing of Federal and State budgets.
3. To set aside conflicting sectional interests for the sake of unity of purpose.
4. To conjoin the interests of Country and City, that is, all producing and consuming interests.
5. To bring about the whole hearted cooperation of employer and employee.

According to labour historian Geoffrey Robinson, the league "posed a major challenge to the established conservative parties", but ultimately "failed because Australian conservatives regrouped and moved back towards the centre".

== Membership ==
The league undertook an extensive recruiting campaign, mostly in Sydney but also in some country areas. It claimed to have gained 30,000 members within three weeks after its launch, rising to 40,000 a week later. Up to 3,500 badges were being issued each day, bearing the distinctive emblem of a six-pointed star. By the end of March 1931, the league claimed 99 branches, including fifteen outside Sydney. The membership stood at 116,000 on 14 April and 130,000 by the end of June.

Most of the league's leadership had not previously been involved in politics. The executive was "strongly representative of managerial and professional men". Former engineering professor Alexander James Gibson was elected president. Other members of the league's provisional executive included:

- Major-General Gordon Bennett, brother of Alfred Bennett
- Andrew Craig, treasurer of the Sydney Chamber of Commerce
- Albert Heath, president of the Sydney and Suburban Timber Merchants' Association
- Cecil Hoskins, chairman and managing director of Australian Iron and Steel
- Norman Keyser, managing director of General Industries
- Robert A. Malloch, managing director of Dangar, Gedye & Malloch, meat preservers
- Sydney Snow, vice-president of the Retail Traders' Association
- Frederick Walker, managing director of F. J. Walker, meat exporters

Later members of the executive included:

- Alfred Bennett, manager of radio station 2GB, founder of the Who's for Australia? League, brother of Gordon Bennett
- Sir Henry Braddon, member of the New South Wales Legislative Council
- Charles M. McDonald, president of the New South Wales Employers' Federation
- Mildred Muscio, feminist, representative of the women's committee
- Olof Oberg, timber merchant and president of the anti-communist "Sane Democracy League"

Braddon, Craig, Heath, and Oberg resigned from the executive over the league's attacks on the state Nationalist Party.

The league had a councillor on the City of Brighton in Victoria – A.R. Horton, who joined in April 1931. The party also had local branch secretary H.P. Armitage as a candidate in the 1931 Victorian local elections, receiving 33.66% of the vote in the City of Oakleigh's South Ward.
