= Gerald O'Sullivan (judge) =

Australian barrister and judge

Gerald John Joseph O'Sullivan (13 October 1891 – 11 September 1960) was an Australian barrister and judge.

O'Sullivan was born at Wangaratta in Victoria to George Rollo O'Sullivan and Theresa Mary, née Willis. He farmed in Victoria and the Riverina before joining the public service as a clerk with the War Pensions Office. In 1916 he enlisted in the First Australian Imperial Force, in which he was assigned to the 35th Battalion. He arrived in England on 27 March 1917 and in France on 23 August, where he was transferred to the radio service. He was formally discharged from the Army on 20 December 1919 and worked in the Pensions and Maternity Allowances Branch; in 1922 he began studying law at the University of Sydney, graduating with his bachelor's degree in 1927. He married Angela Winifred Mary Moylan on 19 November 1927.

O'Sullivan was called to the bar on 6 June 1928 in both New South Wales and Queensland. He resigned from the public service in 1928 to establish a law practice, and also maintained involvement with the military as a captain in the Australian Army Legal Corps and as an Army legal officer during the Second World War. On 1 June 1942 he was appointed Chairman of the Commonwealth's War Pensions Entitlement Appeal Tribunal, serving until 31 May 1947. He was also a member of the Taxation Board of Review until 1950, when he was appointed a District Court Judge and Chairman of Quarter Sessions. On 2 January 1952 he was appointed an acting Judge of the Supreme Court of New South Wales, serving until 25 January; he fulfilled this role again from 12 January to 1 February 1953 to help reduce a backlog.

O'Sullivan died on 11 December 1960, and was survived by his son and three daughters.
