= Charles Hardy (Australian politician) =

Australian politician (1898–1941)

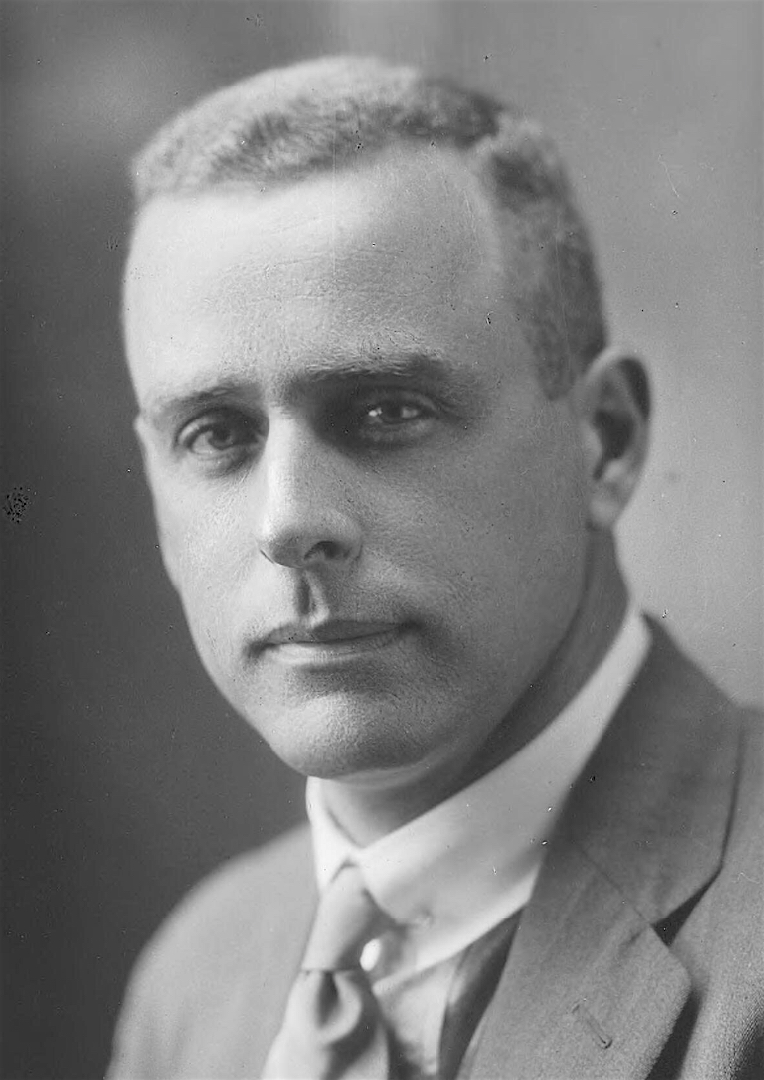

Senator for New South Wales
- In office 1 July 1932 – 30 June 1938

Personal details
- Born: 12 December 1898 Wagga Wagga, New South Wales, Australia
- Died: 27 August 1941 (aged 42) Coen River, Queensland, Australia
- Party: Country
- Occupation: Manufacturer

Charles Downey Hardy (12 December 1898 – 27 August 1941) was an Australian politician who served as a Senator for New South Wales from 1932 to 1938, representing the Country Party. He was the founder of the Riverina Movement, which advocated for the separation of his native Riverina region from the state of New South Wales.

== Early life ==
Born in Wagga Wagga, New South Wales, he was educated at Geelong Grammar School before serving in the military 1917–1919. He returned to become a manufacturer of building supplies, and was a leader of the Riverina new state movement.

Active in local politics since the 1920s, Hardy founded the Riverina Movement with the support of Robert Hankinson and other Riverina business leaders. Hardy was highly critical of the Labor state government of Jack Lang, and, promoted by Clyde Packer's press empire, Hardy travelled the state in an aeroplane making what were described as 'demagogic' speeches. Hardy openly declared himself a fascist, and in Packer's media was described as a 'Cromwell of the Riverina' and likened, favourably, to Benito Mussolini. Such was Hardy's appeal to country voters that he was investigated by the Commonwealth Police. Allegations later surfaced that Hardy may have been attempting to organise a paramilitary movement along the lines of the New Guard, possibly preparing for a coup against the state government.

== Senate ==
In 1931, he was elected to the Australian Senate for New South Wales as a member of the Country Party, taking his seat in 1932. He did not regularly attend the Senate chamber and described it as "simply an echo of city interests that have more than their fair share of representation".

In October 1935, Hardy was elected as the Country Party's Senate leader. His elevation to the position was opposed by Western Australian senators William Carroll and Bertie Johnston; Carroll had previously served as the party's de facto leader. Johnston contested the leadership ballot against Hardy, but was unsuccessful and subsequently left the party to sit as an independent. Hardy failed to win re-election at the 1937 election, with his term concluding on 30 June 1938.

== Later life ==
Having left politics, he became a co-ordinator of works with the Royal Australian Air Force (RAAF). In May 1941, Hardy was appointed as a business liaison officer to the Department of Air, working in an honorary capacity and supervising construction expenditure. Two weeks before his death, he was seconded to the Department of Defence Co-ordination.

=== Death ===
Hardy and two others were killed when an Airlines of Australia charter flight crashed in Far North Queensland on 27 August 1941. The other victims were the pilot Frank Cohen and Lieutenant-Colonel Ramsay Miller, a director of works with the Australian Army. Hardy and Miller were returning from a trip to Thursday Island in the Torres Strait. Their de Havilland Puss Moth was en route to Cairns when it crashed into a bank of the Coen River 2 miles (3.2 km) outside of the township of Coen. Eyewitnesses reported the plane veering out of control before bursting into flames in mid-air. Hardy's body was recovered some distance from the wreckage.

Hardy's body was brought to Sydney and cremated at the Northern Suburbs Crematorium. A memorial service was held on 31 August at St Alban's Church, Lindfield, with Prime Minister Arthur Fadden in attendance.
