= Division of Angas (1903–1934) =

Former Australian federal electoral division

Coordinates: 34°30′S 139°03′E

Angas Australian House of Representatives Division
- Created: 1903
- Abolished: 1934
- Namesake: George Fife Angas

The Division of Angas was an Australian Electoral Division in South Australia. The division was created in 1903 and abolished in 1934. It was named for George Fife Angas, a South Australian pioneer politician, banker and pastoralist who played a significant part in the formation and establishment of the Province of South Australia.

== History ==
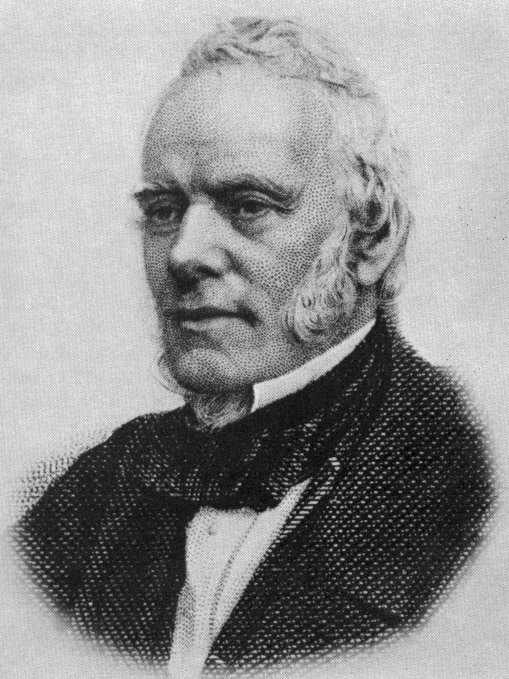
George Fife Angas, the division's namesake

The Division was one of the seven established when the former multi member Division of South Australia was split into single member electorates on 2 October 1903. It was a generally marginal seat which was won at various times by the Australian Labor Party and the Nationalist Party (and their predecessors).

Based on various rural areas adjacent to Adelaide to the north, north-east, east and south-east of Adelaide at different times including Angaston, Cadell, Eudunda, Gawler, Kapunda, Nuriootpa, Mallala, Murray Bridge, Tanunda and Walker Flat.

From 1922 the Division stretched further north eastward as far as the riverland South Australian border. The subdivisions being - Subdivisions of Angaston, Gawler, Gumeracha, Loxton, Magill, Mannum, Mitcham, Mount Pleasant, Murray Bridge, Norton's' Summit, Salisbury, Two Wells, Waikerie and Woodside.

Angas was abolished in May 1934 as a result of redistribution which reduced the number of representatives from South Australia to six. The district was divided between Adelaide, Boothby, Barker, and Wakefield. As a result each of the remaining six electorates had been increased in elector size.

== Members ==
| Image | Member | Party | Term | Notes |
|---|---|---|---|---|
| | Paddy Glynn (1855–1931) | Free Trade | 16 December 1903 – 1906 | Previously held the Division of South Australia. Served as minister under Deakin, Cook and Hughes. Lost seat |
| | Paddy Glynn (1855–1931) | Anti-Socialist | 1906 – 26 May 1909 | Previously held the Division of South Australia. Served as minister under Deakin, Cook and Hughes. Lost seat |
| | Paddy Glynn (1855–1931) | Liberal | 26 May 1909 – 17 February 1917 | Previously held the Division of South Australia. Served as minister under Deakin, Cook and Hughes. Lost seat |
| | Paddy Glynn (1855–1931) | Nationalist | 17 February 1917 – 13 December 1919 | Previously held the Division of South Australia. Served as minister under Deakin, Cook and Hughes. Lost seat |
| | Moses Gabb (1882–1951) | Labor | 13 December 1919 – 14 November 1925 | Lost seat |
| | Walter Parsons (1881–1955) | Nationalist | 14 November 1925 – 12 October 1929 | Lost seat |
| | Moses Gabb (1872–1934) | Labor | 12 October 1929 – March 1931 | Retired after Angas was abolished in 1934 |
| | Moses Gabb (1872–1934) | Independent (Note: Labor-turned-independent MP Moses Gabb was endorsed in the Division of Angas by the Emergency Committee of South Australia (formed by the state UAP for this election) who did not run their own candidate in Angas. Though Gabb is counted as an Emergency Committee MP, he remained an independent and did not help form or sit with the government and as such has been removed from government tallies.) | March 1931 – 7 August 1934 | Retired after Angas was abolished in 1934 |

== See also ==
- Division of Angas (1949–77)
