= 1931 Australian federal election =

- 19 December 1931

All 76 (Note: The Northern Territory had one seat, but members for the territories did not have full voting rights until 1966 and did not count toward government formation.) seats of the House of Representatives 38 seats were needed for a majority in the House 18 (of the 36) seats of the Senate
- Registered: 3,649,954 ▲3.13%
- Turnout: 3,286,474 (95.04%) (Note: Turnout in contested seats) (▲0.19 pp)
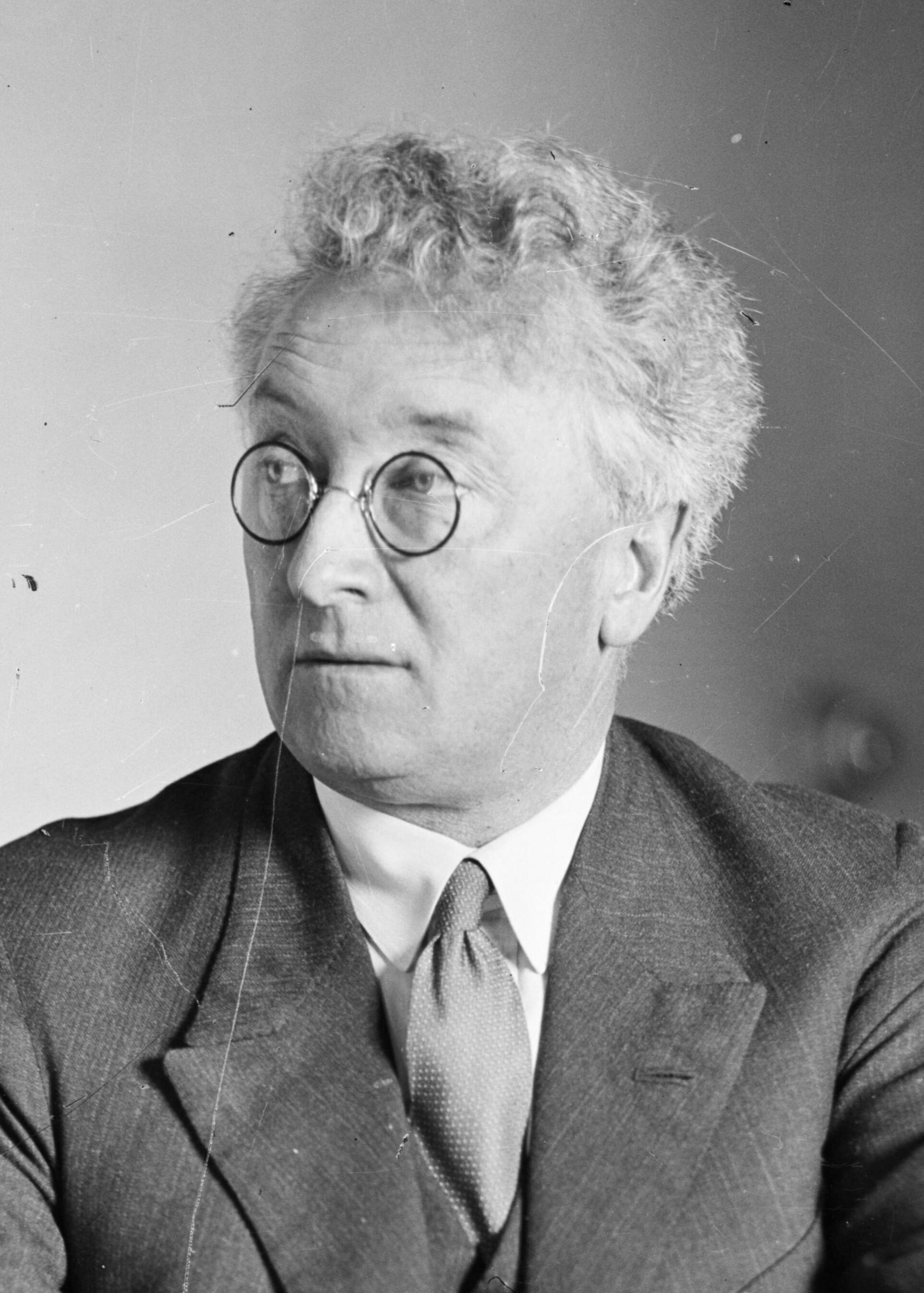

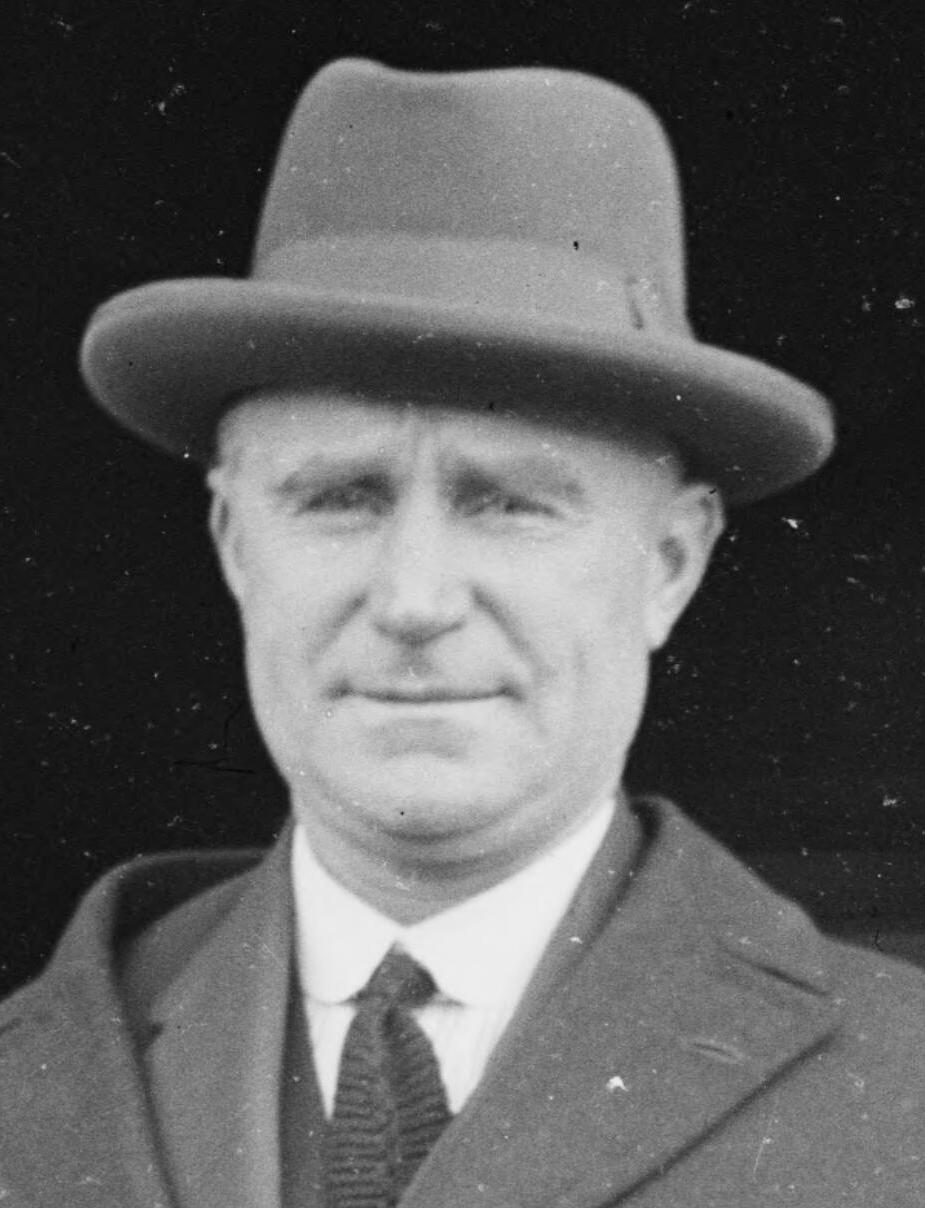

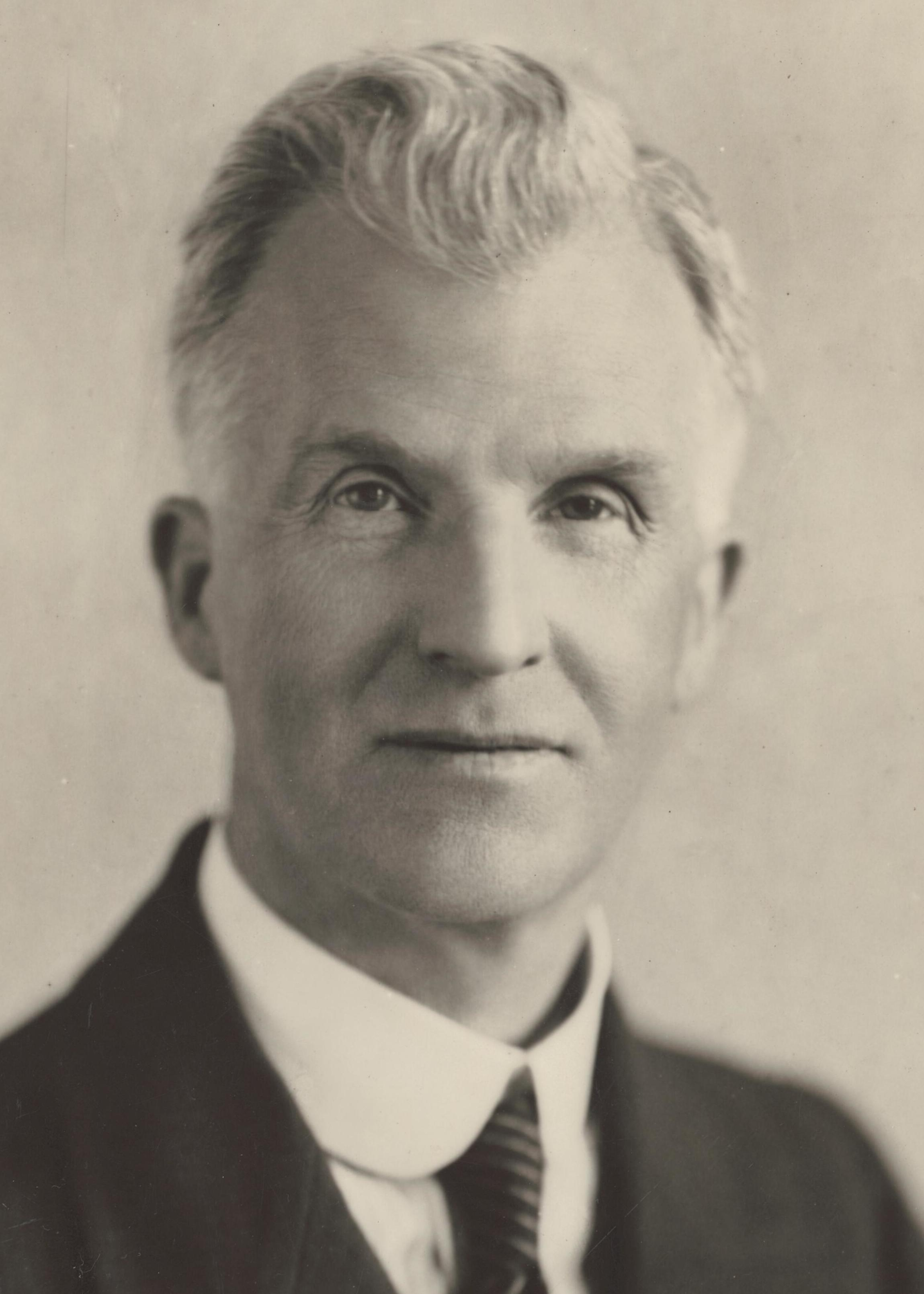

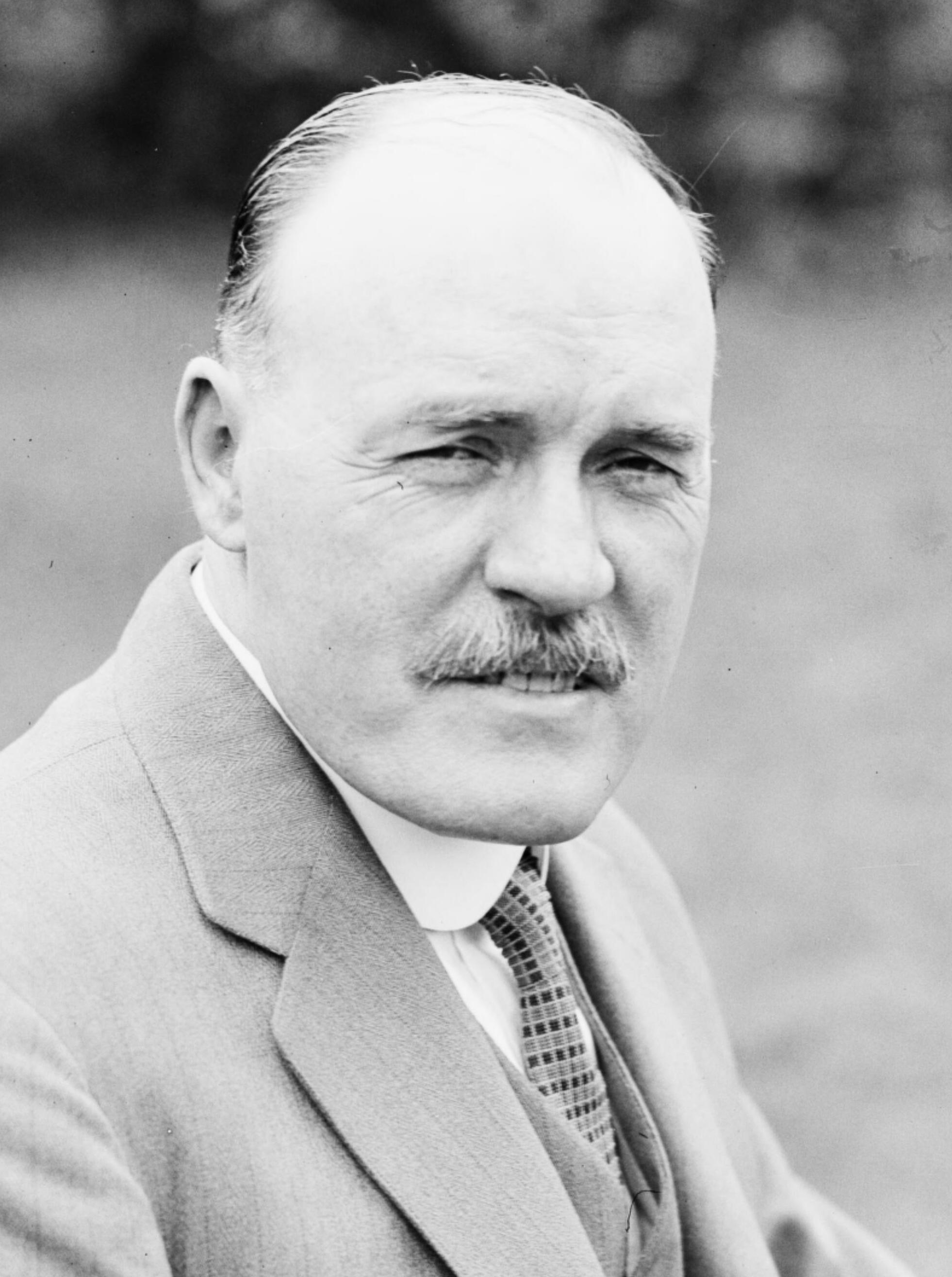
	First party	Second party	Third party
Leader	Joseph Lyons	Earle Page	James Scullin
Party	United Australia	Country	Labor
Leader since	7 May 1931	5 April 1921	26 April 1928
Leader's seat	Wilmot (Tas.)	Cowper (NSW)	Yarra (Vic.)
Last election	New party	10 seats	46 seats
Seats before	24 seats	10 seats	36 seats
Seats won	33 (Note: Labor-turned-Independent MP Moses Gabb was endorsed in the Division of Angas by the Emergency Committee of South Australia (formed by the state UAP for this election) who did not run their own candidate in Angas. Though Gabb is often listed as Emergency Committee, he remained an independent and did not help form or sit with the government and as such has been removed from government tallies, meaning that though six MPs are listed elected as Emergency Committee candidates, there were only five Emergency Committee MPs.)	16	15 + NT
Seat change	▲14	▲6	▼21
Primary vote	1,155,809	388,544	860,260
Percentage	36.4%	12.2%	27.1%
Swing	New party	▲1.9%	▼21.7%
	Fourth party	Fifth party	Sixth party
		ECSA	IND
Leader	Jack Lang	N/A	N/A
Party	Lang Labor	Emergency Committee	Independents
Leader since	N/A	31 July 1923	N/A
Leader's seat	N/A	N/A	N/A
Last election	New party	New party	4 seats
Seats before	5 seats	0 seats
Seats won	4	5	3 seats
Seat change	▼1	▲5	▼1
Primary vote	335,309	174,288	260,786
Percentage	10.6%	5.5%	6%
Swing	▲10.6%	New party	▼ –0.02
- Results by division for the House of Representatives, shaded by winning party's margin of victory.
Prime Minister before election
James Scullin
Labor
Subsequent Prime Minister
Joseph Lyons
United Australia

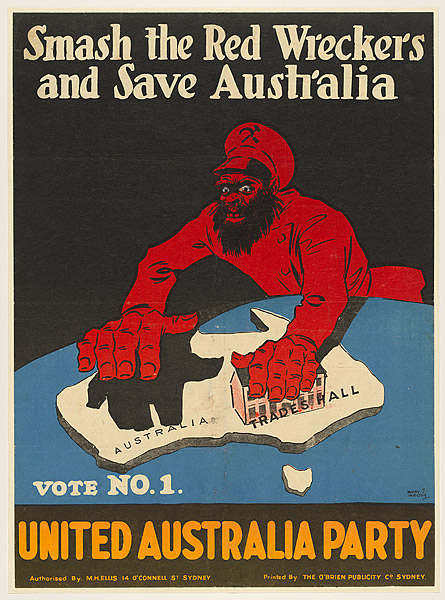
Red-baiting poster from the 1931 election.

The 1931 Australian federal election was held on 19 December 1931 to elect all 75 seats in the House of Representatives and 18 of the 36 seats in the Senate.

The incumbent first-term Australian Labor Party (ALP) government led by Prime Minister James Scullin was defeated in a landslide by the United Australia Party (UAP) led by Joseph Lyons. As of 2025, this is the last time that a sitting government at a federal level has been defeated after a single term.

The election was held at a time of great social and political upheaval, coming at the peak of the Great Depression in Australia. The UAP had only been formed a few months before the election, when Lyons and a few ALP dissidents joined forces with the Nationalist Party and the Australian Party. Although it was dominated by former Nationalists, Lyons became the merged party's leader, with Nationalist leader John Latham as his deputy.

Scullin's position eroded further when five left-wing Labor MPs from New South Wales who supported NSW Premier Jack Lang broke away and moved to the crossbenches in protest of Scullin's economic policy, reducing Scullin to a minority government. Late in 1931, they supported a UAP no-confidence motion and brought down the government. The two Labor factions were decimated; massive vote-splitting left them with only 18 seats between them (14 for the official ALP and four for the Langites).

Prior to the election, it was assumed that the Country Party, led by Earle Page, would hold the balance of power, and Page tentatively agreed to support the UAP if that were the case. The two parties campaigned separately and stood candidates against each other in the House of Representatives, but ran joint tickets in Senate. However, the UAP came up four seats short of a majority. The five MPs from the Emergency Committee of South Australia, which contested the election in that state in place of the UAP and Country Party, joined the UAP party room, giving the UAP enough numbers to form a majority government by two seats. Page was still willing to form a coalition with the Country Party, but negotiations broke down and Lyons decided the UAP would govern by itself. As a result, the First Lyons Ministry was composed solely of UAP members.

Labor spent the next 10 years in opposition; it did not return to power until 1941.

== Issues ==
The election was dominated by the Great Depression in Australia, which was at its height. As the Labor government had come to office two days before the Wall Street crash of 1929, it was seen as being responsible for many of the economic and social problems Australia faced, which sparked the historic Australian Labor Party split of 1931 in which Lyons and four other Labor dissidents crossed the floor to the opposition, ultimately merging into the UAP. Although the UAP, like the Nationalists, was a mostly upper- and middle-class conservative party. However, the presence of Lyons and other ex-Labor MPs allowed the party to project an image of national unity.

By the time the writs were issued, official Labor and Lang Labor were in open warfare. Combined with the Labor defections to the UAP, this made a UAP victory all but certain. Due to the massive vote splitting brought on by a large number of three-cornered contests, Labor tallied its lowest primary (first preference) vote since Federation, while the two Labor factions, official Labor and Lang Labor, won only 18 seats between them, with official Labor losing a record 32 seats on a massive 15.2% swing to the UAP.

The two Labor factions did not reunite until 1936.

== Results ==
The UAP emerged with 38 seats in the House of Representatives (including four members elected as candidates of the South Australian Emergency Committee). The Country Party won 17 seats (including the remaining Emergency Committee candidate, Archie Cameron), while the official Labor Party won 14 seats and Lang Labor won 4 seats.

=== House of Representatives ===
House of Representatives (IRV) – Turnout: 95.04% (CV)
Party		First preference vote			Seats	
Party		Votes	%	Swing (pp)	Seats	Change
United Australia Party	UAP	1,155,809	36.4	+36.4	33	▲15
Country	CP	388,544	12.2	+1.93	16	▲6
Labor	ALP	860,260	27.1	–21.74	16 (Note: Including Northern Territory)	▼22
Emergency Committee	ECSA	174,288	5.5	+5.5	5	▲6
Labor (NSW)	L (NSW)	335,309	10.6	+10.6	4	▼1
Communist	CPA	8,511	0.3	+0.3	0	0
Independent		260,786	6	–0.02	3	▼1
Total		3,287,992	100.00	—N/a	76	—N/a
Valid votes		3,173,515	96.52	—N/a	—N/a	—N/a
Informal ballots		114,477	3.5	—N/a	—N/a	—N/a
Turnout		3,287,992	90	—N/a	—N/a	—N/a
Registered voters		3,652,196	—N/a	—N/a	—N/a	—N/a

First preference vote
United Australia	36.4%
Labor	27.1%
Country	12.2%
Labor (NSW)	10.6%
Independent	6.0%
Emergency Committee	5.5%
Communist	0.3%

Parliament seats
United Australia	43.4%
Country	21.1%
Labor	19.7%
Emergency Committee	6.6%
Labor (NSW)	5.3%
Independent	3.9%

=== Results by electorate ===
Constituency	Total seats	Seats won					
Constituency	Total seats	UAP	CP	ALP	ECSA	L (NSW)	Independent
New South Wales	28	13	8	3	0	4	0
Victoria	20	12	4	4	0	0	0
Queensland	10	2	2	5	0	0	1
South Australia	7	0	0	1	5	0	1
Western Australia	5	1	2	1	0	0	1
Tasmania	5	5	0	0	0	0	0
Northern Territory	1	0	0	1	0	0	0
Total	76	33	16	15	5	4	3

=== Senate ===
Senate (P BV) — 1931–34—Turnout 95.02% (CV) — Informal 9.60%
Party	First preference votes	%	Swing	Seats won	Seats held	Change
UAP/Country (Joint Ticket)	945,741	30.16	*	6		
Australian Labor Party	917,218	29.25	−19.70	3	10	+3
United Australia Party	791,870	25.26	−14.02	9	21	−3
Australian Labor Party (NSW)	379,870	12.12	*	0	0	0
Communist Party of Australia	29,443	0.94	*	0	0	0
Country Party	*	*	−11.18	0	5	0
Independents	71,181	2.27	+1.68	0	0	0
Total	3,135,323			18	36	

=== Results by electorate ===
Constituency	Total seats	Seats won		
Constituency	Total seats	UAP	CP	ALP
New South Wales	3	2	1	0
Victoria	3	3	0	0
Queensland	3	0	0	3
South Australia	3	2	1	0
Western Australia	3	2	1	0
Tasmania	3	3	0	0
Total	18	12	3	3

== Seats changing hands ==
Seat	Pre-1931			Swing	Post-1931		
Seat	Party	Member	Margin	Swing	Margin	Member	Party
Adelaide, SA	Labor	George Edwin Yates	11.4	21.0	9.6	Fred Stacey	Emergency Committee
Angas, SA	Labor	Moses Gabb	4.7	31.5	26.8	Moses Gabb	Ind. Emergency Committee
Ballaarat, Vic	Labor	Charles McGrath	7.4	20.7	13.3	Charles McGrath	United Australia
Barton, NSW	Labor	James Tully	17.6	20.8	3.2	Albert Lane	United Australia
Bass, Tas	Labor	Allan Guy	10.4	24.9	14.5	Allan Guy	United Australia
Batman, Vic	Labor	Frank Brennan	25.8	26.6	0.8	Samuel Dennis	United Australia
Bendigo, Vic	Labor	Richard Keane	5.1	14.6	9.5	Eric Harrison	United Australia
Boothby, SA	Labor	John Price	5.6	29.6	24.0	John Price	Emergency Committee
Brisbane, Qld	United Australia	Donald Charles Cameron	2.4	3.1	0.7	George Lawson	Labor
Calare, NSW	Labor	George Gibbons	1.6	11.7	10.1	Harold Thorby	Country
Corangamite, Vic	Labor	Richard Crouch	2.1	15.0	12.9	William Gibson	Country
Corio, Vic	Labor	Arthur Lewis	6.0	16.6	10.6	Richard Casey	United Australia
Dalley, NSW	Labor	Ted Theodore	N/A	8.9	14.0	Sol Rosevear	Labor (NSW)
Darling Downs, Qld	United Australia	Arthur Morgan	N/A	17.7	9.8	Littleton Groom	Independent
Denison, Tas	Labor	Charles Culley	9.2	14.2	5.0	Arthur Hutchin	United Australia
East Sydney, NSW	Labor (NSW)	Eddie Ward	5.7	11.7	1.7	John Clasby	United Australia
Eden-Monaro, NSW	Labor	John Cusack	0.1	13.7	13.6	John Perkins	United Australia
Flinders, Vic	Labor	Jack Holloway	0.2	18.5	18.3	Stanley Bruce	United Australia
Franklin, Tas	Labor	Charles Frost	1.9	13.0	17.9	Archibald Blacklow	United Australia
Fremantle, WA	Labor	John Curtin	7.0	13.5	5.5	William Watson	United Australia
Grey, SA	Labor	Andrew Lacey	9.6	17.1	7.5	Philip McBride	Emergency Committee
Gwydir, NSW	Labor	Lou Cunningham	3.7	13.5	9.8	Aubrey Abbott	Country
Hume, NSW	Labor	Parker Moloney	6.6	14.1	7.5	Thomas Collins	Country
Hunter, NSW	Labor	Rowley James	100.0	57.2	7.2	Rowley James	Labor (NSW)
Indi, Vic	Labor	Paul Jones	1.4	14.4	13.0	William Hutchinson	United Australia
Lang, NSW	Labor	William Long	16.2	20.4	4.2	Dick Dein	United Australia
Macquarie, NSW	Labor	Ben Chifley	15.6	16.2	0.6	John Lawson	United Australia
Maribyrnong, Vic	Labor	James Fenton	23.2	23.6	0.4	James Fenton	United Australia
Martin, NSW	Labor	John Eldridge	6.4	22.7	16.3	William Holman	United Australia
Oxley, Qld	United Australia	James Bayley	0.1	5.9	5.8	Francis Baker	Labor
Parramatta, NSW	Labor	Albert Rowe	3.3	19.5	16.2	Frederick Stewart	United Australia
Reid, NSW	Labor	Percy Coleman	N/A	55.3	5.3	Joe Gander	Labor (NSW)
South Sydney, NSW	Labor	Edward Riley	16.3	21.4	5.1	John Jennings	United Australia
Wannon, Vic	Labor	John McNeill	2.0	14.3	12.3	Thomas Scholfield	United Australia
Werriwa, NSW	Labor	Bert Lazzarini	15.4	17.1	1.7	Walter McNicoll	Country
West Sydney, NSW	Labor	Jack Beasley	36.5	11.4	15.1	Jack Beasley	Labor (NSW)
Wimmera, Vic	Country Progressive	Percy Stewart	N/A	21.8	11.8	Hugh McClelland	Country
Wilmot, Tas	Labor	Joseph Lyons	2.9	25.0	22.1	Joseph Lyons	United Australia

- Members listed in italics did not contest their seat at this election.

== Government formation ==
After the election, Lyons offered three minor cabinet portfolios to the Country Party, but this offer was rejected by Country Party leader Earle Page and Lyons refused to entertain the full coalition Page sought along the lines of the Bruce–Page government of the 1920s. Lyons formed a UAP-only ministry on 6 January 1932, with Page publicly promising the cooperation of the Country Party in parliament.

Lyons and the UAP initially expected to hold a narrow working majority in the House of Representatives, with 38 out of 75 voting members. However, UAP MP John Clasby died in office in January 1932, less than a month after the election. Lang Labor candidate Eddie Ward won the resulting 1932 East Sydney by-election, with the government reduced to a minority after the election of George Mackay as speaker.

== See also ==
- Candidates of the Australian federal election, 1931
- Members of the Australian House of Representatives, 1931–1934
- Members of the Australian Senate, 1932–1935
