= Electoral results for the Division of East Sydney =

Results for federal seat of East Sydney, New South Wales, Australia

This is a list of electoral results for the Division of East Sydney in Australian federal elections from the division's creation in 1901 until its abolition in 1969.

== Members ==
Member	Party	Term
George Reid	Free Trade, Anti-Socialist	1901–1909
George Reid	Liberal	1909–1910
John West	Labor	1910–1931
Eddie Ward	Labor (NSW)	1931 by–1931
John Clasby	United Australia	1931–1932
Eddie Ward	Labor (NSW)	1932 by–1936
Eddie Ward	Labor	1936–1963
Len Devine	Labor	1963 by–1969

== Election results ==
=== Elections in the 1960s ===
==== 1966 ====
1966 Australian federal election: East Sydney
Party	Candidate	Votes	%	±%
Labor	Len Devine	15,004	52.9	−8.3
Liberal	William Berman	10,636	37.5	+4.4
Democratic Labor	Mel Antcliff	1,807	6.4	+6.4
Communist	Bill Brown	940	3.3	−2.4
Total formal votes		28,387	94.3	
Informal votes		1,731	5.7	
Turnout		30,118	90.3	
Two-party-preferred result
Labor	Len Devine		57.0	−9.4
Liberal	William Berman		43.0	+9.4
Labor hold		Swing	−9.4	

==== 1963 ====
1963 Australian federal election: East Sydney
Party	Candidate	Votes	%	±%
Labor	Len Devine	19,779	61.2	−6.6
Liberal	William Foster	10,711	33.1	+11.1
Communist	Bill Brown	1,827	5.7	+2.5
Total formal votes		32,317	97.3	
Informal votes		885	2.7	
Turnout		33,202	91.8	
Two-party-preferred result
Labor	Len Devine		66.4	−5.5
Liberal	William Foster		33.6	+5.5
Labor hold		Swing	−5.5	

==== 1963 by-election ====
East Sydney by-election, 1963
Party	Candidate	Votes	%	±%
Labor	Len Devine	19,704	80.7	+12.9
Independent Liberal	Vernon Luckman	2,233	9.1	+9.1
Independent	Leslie Bond	1,224	5.0	+5.0
Property Owners	Hazen Cook	699	2.9	+2.9
Republican	John Phillips	546	2.2	+2.2
Total formal votes		24,406	94.9	
Informal votes		1,305	5.1	
Turnout		25,711	71.9	
Two-party-preferred result
Labor	Len Devine		85.1	+13.2
Independent Liberal	Vernon Luckman		14.9	+14.9
Labor hold		Swing	+13.2	

==== 1961 ====
1961 Australian federal election: East Sydney
Party	Candidate	Votes	%	±%
Labor	Eddie Ward	21,999	67.8	+4.6
Liberal	John Folbigg	7,137	22.0	−0.8
Democratic Labor	Joseph Bergin	2,276	7.0	+0.6
Communist	Bill Brown	1,030	3.2	−4.4
Total formal votes		32,442	96.3	
Informal votes		1,247	3.7	
Turnout		33,689	91.9	
Two-party-preferred result
Labor	Eddie Ward		71.9	+1.5
Liberal	John Folbigg		28.1	−1.5
Labor hold		Swing	+1.5	

=== Elections in the 1950s ===
==== 1958 ====
1958 Australian federal election: East Sydney
Party	Candidate	Votes	%	±%
Labor	Eddie Ward	22,377	63.2	−0.4
Liberal	Derek Montefiore-Castle	8,059	22.8	−5.2
Communist	Eddie Maher	2,703	7.6	−0.7
Democratic Labor	Mervyn Reid	2,283	6.4	+6.4
Total formal votes		35,422	95.6	
Informal votes		1,633	4.4	
Turnout		37,055	91.3	
Two-party-preferred result
Labor	Eddie Ward		70.4	+0.2
Liberal	Derek Montefiore-Castle		29.6	−0.2
Labor hold		Swing	+0.2	

==== 1955 ====
1955 Australian federal election: East Sydney
Party	Candidate	Votes	%	±%
Labor	Eddie Ward	24,859	63.6	−3.4
Liberal	Joseph Landor	10,953	28.0	−0.4
Communist	Bill Brown	3,251	8.3	+3.7
Total formal votes		39,063	96.0	
Informal votes		1,642	4.0	
Turnout		40,705	92.2	
Two-party-preferred result
Labor	Eddie Ward		70.2	−0.9
Liberal	Joseph Landor		29.8	+0.9
Labor hold		Swing	−0.9	

==== 1954 ====
1954 Australian federal election: East Sydney
Party	Candidate	Votes	%	±%
Labor	Eddie Ward	19,282	58.0	+3.1
Liberal	George Chambers	12,068	36.3	−8.8
Communist	Bill Brown	1,904	5.7	+5.7
Total formal votes		33,254	98.2	
Informal votes		600	1.8	
Turnout		33,854	94.8	
Two-party-preferred result
Labor	Eddie Ward		62.2	+7.3
Liberal	George Chambers		37.8	−7.3
Labor hold		Swing	+7.3	

==== 1951 ====
1951 Australian federal election: East Sydney
Party	Candidate	Votes	%	±%
Labor	Eddie Ward	20,379	54.9	−2.1
Liberal	Allan Stewart	16,767	45.1	+6.1
Total formal votes		37,146	97.5	
Informal votes		961	2.5	
Turnout		38,107	94.2	
Labor hold		Swing	−3.1	

=== Elections in the 1940s ===
==== 1949 ====
1949 Australian federal election: East Sydney
Party	Candidate	Votes	%	±%
Labor	Eddie Ward	22,496	57.0	−4.8
Liberal	John Mant	15,398	39.0	+5.9
Independent	William Dalton	1,552	3.9	+3.9
Total formal votes		39,446	97.5	
Informal votes		1,015	2.5	
Turnout		40,461	95.5	
Two-party-preferred result
Labor	Eddie Ward		58.0	−6.3
Liberal	John Mant		42.0	+6.3
Labor hold		Swing	−6.3	

==== 1946 ====
1946 Australian federal election: East Sydney
Party	Candidate	Votes	%	±%
Labor	Eddie Ward	37,863	65.5	−3.5
Liberal	Ivan Dougherty	16,348	28.3	+4.8
Protestant People	Wal Campbell	3,578	6.2	+6.2
Total formal votes		57,789	97.1	
Informal votes		1,716	2.9	
Turnout		59,505	92.0	
Two-party-preferred result
Labor	Eddie Ward		67.6	−3.4
Liberal	Ivan Dougherty		32.4	+3.4
Labor hold		Swing	−3.4	

==== 1943 ====
1943 Australian federal election: East Sydney
Party	Candidate	Votes	%	±%
Labor	Eddie Ward	36,531	69.0	+19.9
United Australia	Vincent Brady	12,430	23.5	−7.0
Liberal Democratic	Hugh Angrave	2,377	4.5	+4.5
One Parliament	Ernest Carr	1,141	2.2	+2.2
Independent	Arthur Shirley	494	0.9	+0.9
Total formal votes		52,973	96.4	
Informal votes		1,967	3.6	
Turnout		54,940	94.8	
Two-party-preferred result
Labor	Eddie Ward		71.0	+4.9
United Australia	Vincent Brady		29.0	−4.9
Labor hold		Swing	+4.9	

==== 1940 ====
1940 Australian federal election: East Sydney
Party	Candidate	Votes	%	±%
Labor	Eddie Ward	23,685	49.1	−6.9
United Australia	Lewis Nott	12,211	25.3	−9.7
Labor (N-C)	Steve Gould	5,547	11.5	+11.5
United Australia	James Catts	2,508	5.2	+5.2
Independent	Fred Aarons	2,264	4.7	+4.7
Independent	Diana Gould	1,867	3.9	+3.9
Atokist	Louis Phillips	187	0.4	+0.4
Total formal votes		48,269	95.3	
Informal votes		2,386	4.7	
Turnout		50,655	90.5	
Two-party-preferred result
Labor	Eddie Ward		66.1	+8.1
United Australia	Lewis Nott		33.9	−8.1
Labor hold		Swing	+8.1	

=== Elections in the 1930s ===
==== 1937 ====
1937 Australian federal election: East Sydney
Party	Candidate	Votes	%	±%
Labor	Eddie Ward	28,484	56.0	+51.3
United Australia	Arthur Butterell	20,429	40.2	−2.1
Independent	Thomas Grant	1,603	3.2	+3.2
Independent	Louis Phillips	348	0.7	+0.7
Total formal votes		50,864	97.0	
Informal votes		1,587	3.0	
Turnout		52,451	93.7	
Two-party-preferred result
Labor	Eddie Ward		58.0	+58.0
United Australia	Arthur Butterell		42.0	−2.1
Labor gain from Labor (NSW)		Swing	+2.1	

==== 1934 ====
1934 Australian federal election: East Sydney
Party	Candidate	Votes	%	±%
Labor (NSW)	Eddie Ward	25,567	49.9	+3.9
United Australia	Arthur Butterell	21,686	42.3	+1.2
Labor	George Laughlan	2,400	4.7	−8.2
Communist	Bill McDougall	1,592	3.1	+3.1
Total formal votes		51,245	96.1	
Informal votes		2,070	3.9	
Turnout		53,315	92.0	
Two-party-preferred result
Labor (NSW)	Eddie Ward		55.9	+0.2
United Australia	Arthur Butterell		44.1	−0.2
Labor (NSW) hold		Swing	+0.2	

==== 1932 by-election ====
East Sydney by-election, 1932
Party	Candidate	Votes	%	±%
Labor (NSW)	Eddie Ward	17,461	47.0	+4.6
United Australia	William McCall	16,304	43.9	−0.3
Labor	Lou Cunningham	2,817	7.6	−5.7
Communist	Jack Miles	597	1.6	+1.6
Total formal votes		37,179	97.3	
Informal votes		1,018	2.7	
Turnout		38,197	85.6	
Two-party-preferred result
Labor (NSW)	Eddie Ward	18,676	50.2	+1.9
United Australia	William McCall	18,503	49.8	−1.9
Labor (NSW) gain from United Australia		Swing	+1.9	

==== 1931 ====
1931 Australian federal election: East Sydney
Party	Candidate	Votes	%	±%
United Australia	John Clasby	16,977	44.2	+12.6
Labor (NSW)	Eddie Ward	16,291	42.4	+42.4
Labor	George Buckland	5,112	13.3	−55.1
Total formal votes		38,380	96.2	
Informal votes		1,514	3.8	
Turnout		39,894	91.7	
Two-party-preferred result
United Australia	John Clasby	19,831	51.7	+11.7
Labor (NSW)	Eddie Ward	18,549	48.3	−11.7
United Australia gain from Labor		Swing	+11.7	

==== 1931 by-election ====
East Sydney by-election, 1931
Party	Candidate	Votes	%	±%
Labor	Eddie Ward	19,975	54.1	−14.3
Nationalist	Lionel Courtenay	16,333	44.2	+12.6
Communist	Bill Mountjoy	611	1.7	+1.7
Total formal votes		36,919	97.2	
Informal votes		1,068	2.8	
Turnout		37,987	81.3	
Two-party-preferred result
Labor	Eddie Ward		55.7	−14.3
Nationalist	Lionel Courtenay		44.3	+14.3
Labor hold		Swing	−14.3	

=== Elections in the 1920s ===
==== 1929 ====
1929 Australian federal election: East Sydney
Party	Candidate	Votes	%	±%
Labor	John West	25,105	68.4	+10.0
Nationalist	Hyman Diamond	11,583	31.6	−10.0
Total formal votes		36,688	96.2	
Informal votes		1,451	3.8	
Turnout		38,139	89.1	
Labor hold		Swing	+10.0	

==== 1928 ====
1928 Australian federal election: East Sydney
Party	Candidate	Votes	%	±%
Labor	John West	19,651	58.4	+4.6
Nationalist	Julian Simpson	13,994	41.6	−4.6
Total formal votes		33,645	94.8	
Informal votes		1,852	5.2	
Turnout		35,497	87.9	
Labor hold		Swing	+4.6	

==== 1925 ====
1925 Australian federal election: East Sydney
Party	Candidate	Votes	%	±%
Labor	John West	18,822	53.8	−5.3
Nationalist	Richard Orchard	16,169	46.2	+5.3
Total formal votes		34,991	98.0	
Informal votes		729	2.0	
Turnout		35,720	85.6	
Labor hold		Swing	−5.3	

==== 1922 ====
1922 Australian federal election: East Sydney
Party	Candidate	Votes	%	±%
Labor	John West	10,885	59.1	+1.3
Nationalist	Sir Benjamin Fuller	7,518	40.9	−1.3
Total formal votes		18,403	95.8	
Informal votes		801	4.2	
Turnout		19,204	47.3	
Labor hold		Swing	+1.3	

=== Elections in the 1910s ===
==== 1919 ====
1919 Australian federal election: East Sydney
Party	Candidate	Votes	%	±%
Labor	John West	12,751	57.8	−42.2
Nationalist	John Willson	9,327	42.2	+42.2
Total formal votes		22,078	97.3	
Informal votes		617	2.7	
Turnout		22,695	58.1	
Labor hold		Swing	−42.2	

==== 1917 ====
1917 Australian federal election: East Sydney
Party	Candidate	Votes	%	±%
Labor	John West	unopposed		
Labor hold		Swing		

==== 1914 ====
1914 Australian federal election: East Sydney
Party	Candidate	Votes	%	±%
Labor	John West	12,831	57.3	+1.2
Liberal	Lindsay Thompson	9,568	42.7	−1.2
Total formal votes		22,399	96.8	
Informal votes		736	3.2	
Turnout		23,135	51.1	
Labor hold		Swing	+1.2	

==== 1913 ====
1913 Australian federal election: East Sydney
Party	Candidate	Votes	%	±%
Labor	John West	14,174	56.1	−0.1
Liberal	John Willson	11,077	43.9	+0.1
Total formal votes		25,251	97.2	
Informal votes		733	2.8	
Turnout		25,984	58.0	
Labor hold		Swing	−0.1	

==== 1910 ====
1910 Australian federal election: East Sydney
Party	Candidate	Votes	%	±%
Labour	John West	10,487	57.1	+12.0
Liberal	Samuel Lees	7,890	42.9	−12.0
Total formal votes		18,377	99.0	
Informal votes		181	1.0	
Turnout		18,558	58.9	
Labour gain from Liberal		Swing	+12.0	

=== Elections in the 1900s ===
==== 1906 ====
1906 Australian federal election: East Sydney
Party	Candidate	Votes	%	±%
Anti-Socialist	George Reid	7,229	54.9	−6.4
Labour	John West	5,936	45.1	+12.5
Total formal votes		13,165	98.0	
Informal votes		275	2.0	
Turnout		13,440	49.0	
Anti-Socialist hold		Swing	−9.5	

==== 1903 ====
1903 Australian federal election: East Sydney
Party	Candidate	Votes	%	±%
Free Trade	George Reid	8,103	61.3	−6.7
Labour	Thomas Thrower	4,308	32.6	+32.6
Protectionist	Robert Peel	799	6.1	+6.1
Total formal votes		13,210	97.3	
Informal votes		362	2.7	
Turnout		13,572	38.8	
Free Trade hold		Swing	−7.9	

==== 1903 by-election ====
East Sydney by-election, 1903
Party	Candidate	Votes	%	±%
Free Trade	George Reid	1,697	82.70	+14.67
Protectionist	William Maguire	259	12.62	+12.62
Independent	John Blake	96	4.68	+4.68
Total formal votes		2,052	98.99	+2.32
Informal votes		21	1.01	−2.32
Registered electors		13,763		
Turnout		2,073	15.06	−46.65
Free Trade hold		Swing	+14.67	

==== 1901 ====
1901 Australian federal election: East Sydney
Party	Candidate	Votes	%	±%
Free Trade	George Reid	6,191	68.0	+68.0
Ind. Protectionist	Harry Foran	2,139	23.5	+23.5
Ind. Protectionist	John Cleary	517	5.7	+5.7
Independent	James Toomey	253	2.8	+2.8
Total formal votes		9,100	96.7	
Informal votes		313	3.3	
Turnout		9,413	61.7	
Free Trade win		(new seat)		
