= Candidates of the 1934 Australian federal election =

This article provides information on candidates who stood for the 1934 Australian federal election. The election was held on 15 September 1934.

== By-elections, appointments and defections ==
=== By-elections and appointments ===
- On 6 February 1932, Eddie Ward (NSW Labor) was elected to replace John Clasby (UAP) as the member for East Sydney.
- On 6 April 1933, Herbert Collett (UAP) was appointed as a Western Australian Senator to replace Sir Hal Colebatch (UAP).
- On 11 November 1933, James Fairbairn (UAP) was elected to replace Stanley Bruce (UAP) as the member for Flinders.
- On 5 June 1934, William Holman (UAP), the member for Martin, died. No by-election was held due to the proximity of the election.
- On 31 July 1934, Charles McGrath (UAP), the member for Ballaarat, died. No by-election was held due to the proximity of the election.
- On 2 August 1934, Walter McNicoll (Country), the member for Werriwa, resigned. No by-election was held due to the proximity of the election.

=== Defections ===
- In 1933, Independent MP Sir Littleton Groom (Darling Downs) joined the United Australia Party.
- In 1934, Country Senator Robert Elliott (Victoria) lost preselection. He resigned from the party and sat as an independent.
- In 1934, Labor Senator John Daly (South Australia) was expelled from the state branch of the party, and sat as an independent.
- In 1934, a dispute between the federal Australian Country Party and the state-based United Country Party in Victoria saw the two parties endorse candidates separately. The UCP had demanded that sitting members sign a new pledge before being re-endorsed, which several MPs objected to. The two sitting members, deputy party leader Thomas Paterson (Gippsland) and Hugh McClelland (Wimmera), were endorsed by the federal party. The other Victorian Country Party MP, William Hill (Echuca), retired rather than sign the pledge.

== Redistributions and seat changes ==
- Redistributions of electoral boundaries occurred in New South Wales, Queensland and South Australia.
  - In New South Wales, the UAP-held seat of South Sydney was renamed Watson. The Labor-held seat of Cook and the UAP-held seats of East Sydney (gained by NSW Labor in a by-election) and Lang also became notionally NSW Labor.
    - The member for Lang, Dick Dein (UAP), contested the Senate.
    - The member for South Sydney, John Jennings (UAP), contested Watson.
  - In Queensland, the Labor-held seat of Oxley was renamed Griffith.
    - The member for Oxley, Frank Baker (Labor), contested Griffith.
  - In South Australia, the UAP-held seat of Angas was abolished.
- The member for Corangamite, William Gibson (Country), contested the Senate.

== Retiring Members and Senators ==
=== Labor ===
- Frank Anstey MP (Bourke, Vic)

=== United Australia ===
- Malcolm Cameron MP (Barker, SA)
- Moses Gabb MP (Angas, SA)
- John Latham MP (Kooyong, Vic)
- George Mackay MP (Lilley, Qld)
- William Watson MP (Fremantle, WA)
- Senator Sir Walter Kingsmill (WA)
- Senator Sir Harry Lawson (Vic)
- Senator Matthew Reid (Qld)

=== Country ===
- William Hill MP (Echuca, Vic)

=== Independent ===
- Senator John Daly (SA) [elected as Labor]

== House of Representatives ==
Sitting members at the time of the election are shown in bold text. Successful candidates are highlighted in the relevant colour. Where there is possible confusion, an asterisk (*) is also used.

=== New South Wales ===
Electorate	Held by	Labor candidate	Coalition candidate	Labor (NSW) candidate	Other candidates
Barton	United Australia	Albert Willis	**Albert Lane** (UAP)	John Eldridge	Pat Drew (CPA); John Macara (SC)
Calare	Country	Reginald Phillips	Lewis Nott (UAP); **Harold Thorby*** (CP)	William Keast	Ethel Arthur-Smith (SC)
Cook	Labor	**Edward Riley**	Francis Donnan (UAP)	Jock Garden	Florence Cochrane (SC); Tom Wright (CPA)
Cowper	Country		**Earle Page** (CP)	William McCristal	Hereward Kesteven (SC)
Dalley	Labor (NSW)	William Thompson	William Nicol (UAP)	**Sol Rosevear**	Jervis Blackman (Ind Lab); Henry Giles (SC); James McPhee (CPA)
Darling	Labor	**Arthur Blakeley**	Paul Goldenstedt (CP)	Joe Clark	Stuart Coombe (CPA)
East Sydney	Labor (NSW)	George Laughlan	Arthur Butterell (UAP)	**Eddie Ward**	Bill McDougall (CPA)
Eden-Monaro	United Australia	Leo O'Sullivan	**John Perkins** (UAP)	Charles Johnston	
Gwydir	Country	Arthur Griffith	**Aubrey Abbott** (CP)	Edward Cummins	
Hume	Country	Gerald O'Sullivan	**Thomas Collins** (CP)	Essell Hoad	
Hunter	Labor (NSW)	Thomas Ledsam		**Rowley James**	Henry Scanlon (CPA)
Lang	Labor (NSW)	Allan Howie	Charles Robinson (UAP)	Dan Mulcahy	Colin Barclay-Smith (SC); Rufus Naylor (Ind)
Macquarie	United Australia	Ben Chifley	**John Lawson** (UAP)	Tony Luchetti	Jock Jamieson (CPA); Edward Smythe (SC)
Martin	United Australia	John McCallum; Henry McDicken	William McCall (UAP)	Charles Hankin	William Stones (SC)
New England	Country		Patrick Cantwell (UAP); **Victor Thompson*** (CP)	John O'Connor	
Newcastle	Labor	**David Watkins**		James Smith	Sidney Bethune (CPA)
North Sydney	United Australia		**Billy Hughes** (UAP)	Stan Taylor	Vincent Kelly (SC)
Parkes	United Australia		**Charles Marr** (UAP)	Leo Taylor	Harold Bondeson (SC)
Parramatta	United Australia	John Keegan	**Frederick Stewart** (UAP)	John Garvan	Howard Miscamble (SC)
Reid	Labor (NSW)	Albert Rowe	William Moore (UAP)	**Joe Gander**	Harry Barnes (SC); John Terry (CPA)
Richmond	Country		Jim Eggins (CP); Robert Gibson (CP); **Roland Green*** (CP)	Jim Fredericks	
Riverina	Country	John Cusack	**Horace Nock** (CP)	Edward O'Neill	
Robertson	United Australia		William Fleming (CP); **Sydney Gardner*** (UAP); Campbell Marshall (CP)	Gordon Cross	
Warringah	United Australia		**Archdale Parkhill** (UAP)	Bessie Frewin	Robert Pearson (SC)
Watson	United Australia	William Murphy	**John Jennings** (UAP)	Joe Lamaro	Vincent Murtagh (SC)
Wentworth	United Australia		**Eric Harrison** (UAP)	James Ormonde	Ralph Fretwell (SC)
Werriwa	Country	Thomas Lavelle	Thomas Mutch (UAP)	Bert Lazzarini	Bill Blake (CPA)
West Sydney	Labor (NSW)	Clarrie Campbell	Henry Wood (UAP)	**Jack Beasley**	Robert Brechin (CPA); Frederick Taylor (SC)

=== Northern Territory ===
Electorate	Held by	Labor candidate	Communist candidate	Independent candidate
Northern Territory	Labor	**Harold Nelson**	Charles Priest	Adair Blain

=== Queensland ===
Electorate	Held by	Labor candidate	Coalition candidate	Other candidates
Brisbane	Labor	**George Lawson**	Neil O'Sullivan (UAP)	Bert Hurworth (CPA); Patrick Madden (SC)
Capricornia	Labor	**Frank Forde**	John O'Shanesy (UAP)	
Darling Downs	Independent	Phil Alke	**Sir Littleton Groom** (UAP)	
Griffith	Labor	**Frank Baker**	George Mocatta (UAP)	Julius Streeter (SC)
Herbert	Labor	**George Martens**	Ron Muir (UAP)	Jack Henry (CPA); Claude Vesperman (LL)
Kennedy	Labor	**Darby Riordan**	Jim Clarke (UAP)	Jim Slater (CPA)
Lilley	United Australia	Bert Turner	**Sir Donald Cameron** (UAP)	Clayton Keir (Ind SC)
Maranoa	Country	Duncan Watson	**James Hunter** (CP)	William Argaet (SC)
Moreton	United Australia	Jack Perrett	**Josiah Francis** (UAP)	William Worley (SC)
Wide Bay	Country	George Webb	**Bernard Corser** (CP)	Colin Hennessy (CPA); Geoffrey Nichols (SC)

=== South Australia ===
Electorate	Held by	Labor candidate	Coalition candidate	Other candidates
Adelaide	United Australia	Ken Bardolph	**Fred Stacey** (UAP)	Alec Bagot (Ind); Frank Blake (Ind Lab); Ernest Hergstrom (SC); Arthur McArthur (Ind Lab)
Barker	United Australia	Cecil Skitch	Archie Cameron (CP)	John Maycock (SC)
Boothby	United Australia	David Fraser	**John Price*** (UAP); Keith Wilson (UAP)	Charles Barnard (Ind); James Lumbers (Ind); Norman Truscott (SC)
Grey	United Australia	Michael Murphy	**Philip McBride** (UAP)	Alfred Barns (Ind)
Hindmarsh	Labor	**Norman Makin**		Charles Brock (SC); Ernest Evans (Ind); Tom Garland (CPA)
Wakefield	United Australia	Michael Smedley	**Charles Hawker** (UAP)	Will Duggan (SC)

=== Tasmania ===
Electorate	Held by	Labor candidate	UAP candidate	Other candidates
Bass	United Australia	Claude Barnard	**Allan Guy**	George McElwee (Ind); John Watson (Ind)
Darwin	United Australia	Edwin Brown	**George Bell**	
Denison	United Australia	Richard Darcey; John Lattin; Gerald Mahoney*; Walter Woods	**Arthur Hutchin**	James Guthrie (SC)
Franklin	United Australia	Charles Frost	**Archibald Blacklow**	George Frankcombe (CP); John Modridge (SC)
Wilmot	United Australia		**Joseph Lyons**	Henry Bye (SC); William Laird Smith (SC)

=== Victoria ===
Electorate	Held by	Labor candidate	Coalition candidate	Other candidates
Balaclava	United Australia	Michael Nolan	**Thomas White** (UAP)	
Ballaarat	United Australia	William McAdam	Archibald Fisken (UAP)	Fred Edmunds (Ind UAP)
Batman	United Australia	Frank Brennan	**Samuel Dennis** (UAP)	
Bendigo	United Australia	Richard Keane	**Eric Harrison** (UAP)	
Bourke	Labor	Maurice Blackburn	Henry Stubbs (UAP)	Robert McCrae (CPA)
Corangamite	Country	Arthur Haywood	Gordon Bristow (ACP); Gordon McGregor (ACP); Geoffrey Street* (UAP)	Bevis Walters (Ind)
Corio	United Australia	John Dedman	**Richard Casey** (UAP)	William Morrison (CPA)
Echuca	Country	William Hartshorne	John McEwen* (UCP); William Moss (ACP); Galloway Stewart (ACP)	
Fawkner	United Australia	William Smith	**George Maxwell** (UAP)	Frederick Paice (SC)
Flinders	United Australia	Joseph Hannan	**James Fairbairn*** (UAP); William Fullerton (CP)	Ralph Gibson (CPA)
Gippsland	Country	Reg Pollard	**Thomas Paterson** (ACP)	
Henty	United Australia	William Turner	**Sir Henry Gullett** (UAP)	Alexander Steele (Ind Nat); Lockhart Stewart (SC)
Indi	United Australia	Paul Jones	Vernon Davies (UCP); **William Hutchinson*** (UAP)	
Kooyong	United Australia	Maurice Kelly	Robert Menzies (UAP)	Leslie Hollins (SC)
Maribyrnong	United Australia	Arthur Drakeford	**James Fenton** (UAP)	Alexander Amess (SC); Jack Blake (CPA)
Melbourne	Labor	**William Maloney**	Francis Nelson (UAP)	
Melbourne Ports	Labor	**Jack Holloway**	James Laurence (UAP)	William Clarke (Soc Lab)
Wannon	United Australia	Don McLeod	Henry Bailey (UCP); **Thomas Scholfield*** (UAP)	
Wimmera	Country		**Hugh McClelland*** (ACP); William Morgan (UAP); Les Simpson (UCP)	Gordon Anderson (STL)
Yarra	Labor	**James Scullin**	Harold Holt (UAP)	Ernie Thornton (CPA)

=== Western Australia ===
Electorate	Held by	Labor candidate	Coalition candidate	Other candidates
Forrest	Country	Edwin Davies	Cecil Elsegood (CP); **John Prowse*** (CP)	Harry Squance (SC)
Fremantle	United Australia	John Curtin	Florence Cardell-Oliver (UAP)	William Buchan (SC)
Kalgoorlie	Labor	**Albert Green**		
Perth	United Australia	Herb Graham	**Walter Nairn** (UAP)	Carlyle Ferguson (Ind Lib); Tom Hartrey (WA Nat)
Swan	Country	Frederick Law	**Henry Gregory** (CP)	

== Senate ==
Sitting Senators are shown in bold text. Tickets that elected at least one Senator are highlighted in the relevant colour. Successful candidates are identified by an asterisk (*).

=== New South Wales ===
Three seats were up for election. The Labor Party was defending three seats (although Senators Dunn and Rae had joined the Lang Labor breakaway). United Australia Party Senators Charles Cox and Sir Walter Massy-Greene and Country Party Senator Charles Hardy were not up for re-election.

Labor candidates	Coalition candidates	NSW Labor candidates	Social Credit candidates	Other candidates
Gordon Anderson; **John Dooley**; Alex Hogan	Mac Abbott* (CP); Lionel Courtenay* (UAP); Dick Dein* (UAP)	**James Dunn**; Patrick Mooney; **Arthur Rae**	Stanley Allen; Lillie Beirne; John White	Lance Sharkey (CPA)

=== Queensland ===
Three seats were up for election. The United Australia Party was defending three seats. Labor Senators Gordon Brown, Joe Collings and John MacDonald were not up for re-election.

Labor candidates	Coalition candidates	Social Credit candidates	Other candidates
Frank Byrne; Robert Carroll; Lewis McDonald	Walter Cooper* (CP); **Thomas Crawford*** (UAP); **Harry Foll*** (UAP)	John Harding; William Hartley; Joanna Helbach	Theo Kissick (Ind Lab); Fred Paterson (CPA); Sydney Williams (LL)

=== South Australia ===
Three seats were up for election. The Labor Party was defending three seats. United Australia Party Senators Jack Duncan-Hughes and Alexander McLachlan and Country Party Senator Oliver Badman were not up for re-election.

Labor candidates	UAP candidates	Other candidates
Edgar Dawes; **Bert Hoare**; **Mick O'Halloran**	James McLachlan*; George McLeay*; Oliver Uppill*	Ted Moyle (CPA)

=== Tasmania ===
Three seats were up for election. The United Australia Party was defending three seats. Note that, apart from Group A, all candidates appeared in the ungrouped column. United Australia Party Senators John Millen, Herbert Payne and Burford Sampson were not up for re-election.

Labor candidates	UAP candidates	Country candidates	Other candidates
Eric Howroyd; Henry Lane; John Palamountain; Basil Plummer	Andrew Cooper; **Charles Grant***; **John Hayes***; **Herbert Hays***; William Judd; Henry McFie	Percy Best; Stephen Broad; Alfred Seabrook	William Daft (CPA)

=== Victoria ===
Three seats were up for election. The United Australia Party-Country Party Coalition was defending two seats. The Labor Party was defending one seat. United Australia Party Senators Tom Brennan, James Guthrie and William Plain were not up for re-election.

Labor candidates	Coalition candidates	Other candidates
**John Barnes**; Charlie Crofts; Parker Moloney	Charles Brand* (UAP); William Gibson* (CP); John Leckie* (UAP)	**Robert Elliott** (Ind); Gerry O'Day (CPA)

=== Western Australia ===
Three seats were up for election. The United Australia Party-Country Party Coalition was defending three seats. United Australia Party Senators Patrick Lynch and Sir George Pearce and Country Party Senator William Carroll were not up for re-election.

Labor candidates	Coalition candidates	Social Credit candidates	Other candidates
Reginald Bourke; Louis Greive; Edward Holman	**Herbert Collett*** (UAP); **Bertie Johnston*** (CP); Allan MacDonald* (UAP)	John Clements; Ormond Cook; Alfred Jacobs	Richard Fitzgerald (Nat. Sec.); Bill Mountjoy (CPA); Edwin Murphy (Ind); Oliver Strang (Nat. Sec.)

== See also ==
- 1934 Australian federal election
- Members of the Australian House of Representatives, 1931–1934
- Members of the Australian House of Representatives, 1934–1937
- Members of the Australian Senate, 1932–1935
- Members of the Australian Senate, 1935–1938
- List of political parties in Australia
