= List of members of the Australian Parliament who died in office =

The following is a list of members of the Australian Parliament who died in office.

== Senate ==
Member	Party	State	Date of death	Age at death	Cause
Frederick Thomas Sargood	Free Trade	Victoria	2 January 1903	68	
William Russell	Labor	South Australia	28 June 1912	69	Heart disease
Gregor McGregor	Labor	South Australia	13 August 1914	65	Heart disease
Robert Guthrie	Nationalist	South Australia	20 January 1921	63	Struck by a tram
John Adamson	Nationalist	Queensland	2 May 1922	65	Fell in front of a train in possible suicide
Thomas Bakhap	Nationalist	Tasmania	18 August 1923	56	
Edward Millen	Nationalist	New South Wales	14 September 1923	62	Chronic nephritis
Stephen Barker	Labor	Victoria	21 June 1924	77-78	
Allan McDougall	Labor	New South Wales	14 October 1924	67	Diabetes
Jack Power	Labor	New South Wales	13 January 1925	41	
Edward Russell	Nationalist	Victoria	18 July 1925	46	Brain disease
James O'Loghlin	Labor	South Australia	4 December 1925	73	Tuberculosis
Charles McHugh	Labor	South Australia	24 July 1927	40	Pneumonia
John Grant	Labor	New South Wales	19 May 1928	70-71	
Thomas Givens	Nationalist	Queensland	19 June 1928	64	Heart disease
David Andrew	Country	Victoria	19 November 1928	62	
John Chapman	Country	South Australia	14 March 1931	51	Pneumonia
Harold Elliott	Nationalist	Victoria	23 March 1931	52	Suicide caused by post-traumatic stress disorder
James Ogden	United Australia	Tasmania	5 February 1932	63	
John Newlands	United Australia	South Australia	20 May 1932	67	
Walter Kingsmill	United Australia	Western Australia	15 January 1935	70	Coronary occlusion
Lionel Courtenay	United Australia	New South Wales	11 July 1935	55	
William Carroll	Country	Western Australia	30 May 1936	64	
John MacDonald	Labor	Queensland	17 August 1937	57	Heart disease
John Barnes	Labor	Victoria	31 January 1938	69	Cancer
Bertie Johnston	Country	Western Australia	6 September 1942	62	Drowning
James Cunningham	Labor	Western Australia	4 July 1943	63	
Richard Keane	Labor	Victoria	26 April 1946	65	Heart disease
Richard Nash	Labor	Western Australia	12 December 1951	61	Heart attack
Edmund Piesse	Country	Western Australia	25 August 1952	62	Suicide by carbon-monoxide poisoning
Jack Chamberlain	Liberal	Tasmania	16 January 1953	68	
George McLeay	Liberal	South Australia	14 September 1955	63	Ischemic heart disease
Jack Devlin	Labor	Victoria	26 May 1957	57	
Bill Ashley	Labor	New South Wales	27 June 1958	76	Stroke
Harrie Seward	Country	Western Australia	23 July 1958	74	
Rex Pearson	Liberal	South Australia	11 September 1961	56	
Albert Reid	Country	Queensland	22 May 1962	76	Heart attack
Max Poulter	Labor	Queensland	2 September 1962	49	
Seddon Vincent	Liberal	Western Australia	9 November 1964	56	
Harrie Wade	Country	Victoria	18 November 1964	59	Heart attack
Shane Paltridge	Liberal	Western Australia	21 January 1966	56	Cancer
Bob Sherrington	Liberal	Queensland	16 March 1966	64	
Charles Sandford	Labor	Victoria	22 October 1966	71	
Clive Hannaford	Independent	South Australia	24 October 1967	64	
Keith Laught	Liberal	South Australia	13 May 1969	61	
Sam Cohen	Labor	Victoria	7 October 1969	50	Heart attack
Colin McKellar	Country	New South Wales	13 April 1970	66	Coronary heart disease
James Ormonde	Labor	New South Wales	30 November 1970	67	
Bertie Milliner	Labor	Queensland	30 June 1975	63	Heart attack
Ivor Greenwood	Liberal	Victoria	13 October 1976	49	Heart attack
John Knight	Liberal	Australian Capital Territory	4 March 1981	37	Heart attack
Alan Missen	Liberal	Victoria	30 March 1986	60	Heart attack
Olive Zakharov	Labor	Victoria	6 March 1995	65	Struck by a car
John Panizza	Liberal	Western Australia	31 January 1997	65	
Jeannie Ferris	Liberal	South Australia	1 April 2007	66	Ovarian cancer
Judith Adams	Liberal	Western Australia	31 March 2012	68	Breast cancer
Alex Gallacher	Labor	South Australia	29 August 2021	67	Lung cancer
Kimberley Kitching	Labor	Victoria	10 March 2022	52	Heart attack (suspected)
Jim Molan	Liberal	New South Wales	16 January 2023	72	Cancer
Linda White	Labor	Victoria	29 February 2024	63-64	Cancer

== House of Representatives ==
Member	Party	State/Division	Date of death	Age at death	Cause
William Henry Groom	Protectionist	Queensland (Darling Downs)	8 August 1901	68	Bronchial catarrh, heart failure
Frederick William Piesse	Free Trade	Tasmania (Tasmania)	6 March 1902	53	
Edward Braddon	Free Trade	Tasmania (Wilmot)	2 February 1904	74	
Charles Kingston	Protectionist	South Australia (Adelaide)	11 May 1908	57	Stroke
Frederick Holder	Independent	South Australia (Wakefield)	23 July 1909	59	Cerebral hemorrhage
James Hutchison	Labor	South Australia (Hindmarsh)	6 December 1909	50	Complications from kidney surgery
Henry Beard	Labor	Victoria (Batman)	18 December 1910	45-46	Complications from a medical operation
George Edwards	Liberal	New South Wales (North Sydney)	4 February 1911	56	Gas explosion
Lee Batchelor	Labor	South Australia (Boothby)	8 October 1911	46	Heart attack
Charlie Frazer	Labor	Western Australia (Kalgoorlie)	25 November 1913	33	Pneumonia
Ernest Roberts	Labor	South Australia (Adelaide)	2 December 1913	45	Heart disease
John Arthur	Labor	Victoria (Bendigo)	9 December 1914	39	Kidney disease
Edward Jolley	Labor	Victoria (Grampians)	1 January 1915	40-41	Cerebral hemorrhage
Robert Howe	Labor	New South Wales (Dalley)	2 April 1915	53-54	
Charles Howroyd	Nationalist	Tasmania (Darwin)	10 May 1917	50	
Charles Carty Salmon	Nationalist	Victoria (Grampians)	15 September 1917	57	
John Forrest	Nationalist	Western Australia (Swan)	2 September 1918	71	Skin cancer
James Chester Manifold	Nationalist	Victoria (Corangamite)	30 October 1918	51	Pneumonia
Albert Palmer	Nationalist	Victoria (Echuca)	14 August 1919	59-60	Pneumonia
Jim Page	Labor	Queensland (Maranoa)	3 June 1921	59-60	
T.J. Ryan	Labor	New South Wales (West Sydney)	1 August 1921	45	Pneumonia
Frank Tudor	Labor	Victoria (Yarra)	10 January 1922	55	
Austin Chapman	Nationalist	New South Wales (Eden-Monaro)	12 January 1926	61	Cerebro-vascular disease
Herbert Pratten	Nationalist	New South Wales (Parramatta)	7 May 1928	63	Cerebral hemorrhage
Edward Corser	Nationalist	Queensland (Wide Bay)	31 July 1928	75-76	
William Lambert	Labor	New South Wales (West Sydney)	6 September 1928	47	Heart attack
William McWilliams	Independent	Tasmania (Franklin)	22 October 1929	73	Angina pectoris
John West	Labor	New South Wales (East Sydney)	5 February 1931	79	
Percy Stewart	Independent	Victoria (Wimmera)	15 October 1931	45	Pneumonia
John Clasby	United Australia	New South Wales (East Sydney)	15 January 1932	40-41	
William Holman	United Australia	New South Wales (Martin)	5 June 1934	62	
Charles McGrath	United Australia	Victoria (Ballaarat)	21 July 1934	61	
David Watkins	Labor	New South Wales (Newcastle)	8 April 1935	69	Cancer
George Maxwell	United Australia	Victoria (Fawkner)	25 June 1935	76	
Darby Riordan	Labor	Queensland (Kennedy)	15 October 1936	50	Pneumonia
Littleton Groom	United Australia	Queensland (Darling Downs)	6 November 1936	69	Cerebro-vascular disease
Charles Hawker	United Australia	South Australia (Wakefield)	25 October 1938	44	Plane crash
Francis Baker	Labor	Queensland (Griffith)	28 March 1939	35-36	Motor accident
Joseph Lyons	United Australia	Tasmania (Wilmot)	7 April 1939	59	Heart attack
Geoffrey Street	United Australia	Victoria (Corangamite)	13 August 1940	46	Plane crash
James Fairbairn	United Australia	Victoria (Flinders)	13 August 1940	43	Plane crash
Henry Gullett	United Australia	Victoria (Henty)	13 August 1940	62	Plane crash
Albert Green	Labor	Western Australia (Kalgoorlie)	2 October 1940	70	
Henry Gregory	Country	Western Australia (Swan)	15 November 1940	80	
John Price	United Australia	South Australia (Boothby)	23 April 1941	59	
John Curtin	Labor	Western Australia (Fremantle)	5 July 1945	60	Heart disease
Ben Chifley	Labor	New South Wales (Macquarie)	13 June 1951	65	Heart attack
Jim Eggins	Country	New South Wales (Lyne)	28 January 1952	53	Cerebral disease
Rupert Ryan	Liberal	Victoria (Flinders)	25 August 1952	68	Heart failure
Bert Lazzarini	Labor	New South Wales (Werriwa)	1 October 1952	68	Cerebral hemorrhage
Billy Hughes	Liberal	New South Wales (Bradfield)	28 October 1952	90	
Sol Rosevear	Labor	New South Wales (Dalley)	21 March 1953	61	Coronary occlusion
Allan McDonald	Liberal	Victoria (Corangamite)	10 June 1953	64	Cancer
Dan Mulcahy	Labor	New South Wales (Lang)	21 July 1953	71	
Thomas Treloar	Liberal	New South Wales (Gwydir)	15 November 1953	61	
Tom Sheehan	Labor	New South Wales (Cook)	26 March 1955	63	
Billy Davies	Labor	New South Wales (Cunningham)	17 February 1956	71-72	
Archie Cameron	Liberal	South Australia (Barker)	9 August 1956	61	Heart attack
Larry Anthony	Country	New South Wales (Richmond)	12 July 1957	60	Cerebrovascular disease
Harry Bruce	Labor	Queensland (Leichhardt)	11 October 1958	74	Heart attack
Percy Clarey	Labor	Victoria (Bendigo)	17 May 1960	70	Pneumonia
Frank Timson	Liberal	Victoria (Higinbotham)	16 October 1960	51	Heart attack
Alan Bird	Labor	Victoria (Batman)	21 July 1962	55	
Edgar Russell	Labor	South Australia (Grey)	31 March 1963	72	
Eddie Ward	Labor	New South Wales (East Sydney)	31 July 1963	64	Heart attack
Athol Townley	Liberal	Tasmania (Denison)	24 December 1963	58	
George Shaw	Country	Queensland (Dawson)	9 January 1966	58	Cerebral hemorrhage
John Cockle	Liberal	New South Wales (Warringah)	3 August 1966	57	Heart attack
George Gray	Country	Queensland (Capricornia)	2 August 1967	63	Pulmonary edema
Harold Holt	Liberal	Victoria (Higgins)	17 December 1967	59	Disappeared. Presumed drowned
Jim Fraser	Labor	Australian Capital Territory (Australian Capital Territory)	1 April 1970	62	Cancer
Wilfrid Kent Hughes	Liberal	Victoria (Chisholm)	30 July 1970	75	
Rex Connor	Labor	New South Wales (Cunningham)	22 August 1977	70	Coronary occlusion
Frank Stewart	Labor	New South Wales (Grayndler)	16 April 1979	56	Heart attack
Eric Robinson	Liberal	Queensland (McPherson)	7 January 1981	51	Heart attack
Greg Wilton	Labor	Victoria (Isaacs)	14 June 2000	44	Suicide
Peter Nugent	Liberal	Victoria (Aston)	24 April 2001	63	Heart attack
Don Randall	Liberal	Western Australia (Canning)	21 July 2015	62	Heart attack
Peta Murphy	Labor	Victoria (Dunkley)	4 December 2023	50	Breast Cancer
