= Robert Carroll =

Robert, Bob or Bobby Carroll may refer to:

- Robert Carroll (Australian politician) (1876–1940), member of the Queensland Legislative Council
- Bob Carroll (singer/actor) (1918–1994), singer and stage, television, and film actor
- Bob Carroll Jr. (1918–2007), television writer
- Bob Carroll (author) (1936–2009), sports author and historian
- Robert L. Carroll (1938–2020), American paleontologist
- Bobby Carroll (Robert Carroll, 1938–2016), Scottish footballer
- Robert Carroll (boxer), 1938 United States Amateur flyweight champion
- Bob Carroll (footballer) (1941–2021), Australian rules footballer
- Robert Todd Carroll (1945–2016), American academic and well-known skeptic of pseudoscience
- Robert Carroll (American politician) (born 1986), member of the New York State Assembly
- Robbie Carroll (born 1968), English footballer

== See also ==
- Bob Carroll (disambiguation)
