= Members of the Australian House of Representatives, 1934–1937 =

This is a list of the members of the Australian House of Representatives in the 14th Australian Parliament, which was elected at the 1934 election on 15 September 1934. The incumbent United Australia Party led by Prime Minister of Australia Joseph Lyons with coalition partner the Country Party led by Earle Page defeated the opposition Australian Labor Party led by James Scullin. Labor's share of the primary vote fell to an even lower number than in the 1931 election due to the Lang Labor split, but it was able to pick up an extra four seats on preferences and therefore improve on its position.

Member	Party	Electorate	State	In office
Aubrey Abbott	Country	Gwydir	NSW	1925–1929, 1931–1937
Frank Baker	Labor	Griffith	Qld	1931–1939
Claude Barnard	Labor	Bass	Tas	1934–1949
Jack Beasley	Lang Labor/Labor	West Sydney	NSW	1928–1946
George Bell	United Australia	Darwin	Tas	1919–1922, 1925–1943
Maurice Blackburn	Labor	Bourke	Vic	1934–1943
Adair Blain	Independent	Northern Territory	NT	1934–1949
Frank Brennan	Labor	Batman	Vic	1911–1931, 1934–1949
Archie Cameron	United Australia	Barker	SA	1934–1956
Sir Donald Charles Cameron	United Australia	Lilley	Qld	1919–1931, 1934–1937
Richard Casey	United Australia	Corio	Vic	1931–1940, 1949–1960
Joe Clark	Lang Labor/Labor	Darling	NSW	1934–1969
Thomas Collins	Country	Hume	NSW	1931–1943
Bernard Corser	Country	Wide Bay	Qld	1928–1954
John Curtin	Labor	Fremantle	WA	1928–1931, 1934–1945
Arthur Drakeford	Labor	Maribyrnong	Vic	1934–1955
Arthur Fadden	Country	Darling Downs	Qld	1936–1958
James Fairbairn	United Australia	Flinders	Vic	1933–1940
Archibald Fisken	United Australia	Ballaarat	Vic	1934–1937
Frank Forde	Labor	Capricornia	Qld	1922–1946
Josiah Francis	United Australia	Moreton	Qld	1922–1955
Charles Frost	Labor	Franklin	Tas	1929–1931, 1934–1946
Joe Gander	Lang Labor/Labor	Reid	NSW	1931–1940
Jock Garden	Lang Labor/Labor	Cook	NSW	1934–1937
Sydney Gardner	United Australia	Robertson	NSW	1922–1940
Albert Green	Labor	Kalgoorlie	WA	1922–1940
Roland Green	Country	Richmond	NSW	1922–1937
Henry Gregory	Country	Swan	WA	1913–1940
Sir Littleton Groom	United Australia	Darling Downs	Qld	1901–1929, 1931–1936
Henry Gullett	United Australia	Henty	Vic	1925–1940
Eric Fairweather Harrison	United Australia	Bendigo	Vic	1931–1937
Eric Harrison	United Australia	Wentworth	NSW	1931–1956
Charles Hawker	United Australia	Wakefield	SA	1929–1938
Jack Holloway	Labor	Melbourne Ports	Vic	1929–1951
Harold Holt	United Australia	Fawkner	Vic	1935–1967
Billy Hughes	United Australia	North Sydney	NSW	1901–1952
James Hunter	Country	Maranoa	Qld	1921–1940
William Hutchinson	United Australia	Indi	Vic	1931–1949
Rowley James	Lang Labor/Labor	Hunter	NSW	1928–1958
John Jennings	United Australia	Watson	NSW	1931–1940
Albert Lane	United Australia	Barton	NSW	1931–1940
George Lawson	Labor	Brisbane	Qld	1931–1961
John Lawson	United Australia	Macquarie	NSW	1931–1940
Bert Lazzarini	Lang Labor/Labor	Werriwa	NSW	1919–1931, 1934–1952
Joseph Lyons	United Australia	Wilmot	Tas	1929–1939
Gerald Mahoney	Labor	Denison	Tas	1934–1940
Norman Makin	Labor	Hindmarsh	SA	1919–1946, 1954–1963
William Maloney	Labor	Melbourne	Vic	1904–1940
Sir Charles Marr	United Australia	Parkes	NSW	1919–1929, 1931–1943
George Martens	Labor	Herbert	Qld	1928–1946
George Maxwell	United Australia	Fawkner	Vic	1917–1935
Philip McBride	United Australia	Grey	SA	1931–1937, 1937–1943 (S), 1946–1958
William McCall	United Australia	Martin	NSW	1934–1943
Hugh McClelland	Country	Wimmera	Vic	1931–1937
John McEwen	Country	Echuca	Vic	1934–1971
Robert Menzies	United Australia	Kooyong	Vic	1934–1966
Dan Mulcahy	Lang Labor/Labor	Lang	NSW	1934–1953
Walter Nairn	United Australia	Perth	WA	1929–1943
Horace Nock	Country	Riverina	NSW	1931–1940
Sir Earle Page	Country	Cowper	NSW	1919–1961
Archdale Parkhill	United Australia	Warringah	NSW	1927–1937
Thomas Paterson	Country	Gippsland	Vic	1922–1943
John Perkins	United Australia	Eden-Monaro	NSW	1926–1929, 1931–1943
John Price	United Australia	Boothby	SA	1928–1941
John Prowse	Country	Forrest	WA	1919–1943
Bill Riordan	Labor	Kennedy	Qld	1936–1966
Darby Riordan	Labor	Kennedy	Qld	1929–1936
Sol Rosevear	Lang Labor/Labor	Dalley	NSW	1931–1953
Thomas Scholfield	United Australia	Wannon	Vic	1931–1940
James Scullin	Labor	Yarra	Vic	1910–1913, 1922–1949
William Scully	Labor	Gwydir	NSW	1937–1949
Fred Stacey	United Australia	Adelaide	SA	1931–1943
Frederick Stewart	United Australia	Parramatta	NSW	1931–1946
Geoffrey Street	United Australia	Corangamite	Vic	1934–1940
Victor Thompson	Country	New England	NSW	1922–1940
Harold Thorby	Country	Calare	NSW	1931–1940
Eddie Ward	Lang Labor/Labor	East Sydney	NSW	1931, 1932–1963
David Watkins	Labor	Newcastle	NSW	1901–1935
David Oliver Watkins	Labor	Newcastle	NSW	1935–1958
Thomas White	United Australia	Balaclava	Vic	1929–1951
