= 1963 East Sydney by-election =

A by-election was held for the Australian House of Representatives seat of East Sydney on 28 September 1963. This was triggered by the death of long-serving Labor MP and Curtin and Chifley government minister Eddie Ward.

The by-election was won by Labor candidate Len Devine. The governing Liberal Party's decision not to nominate a candidate saw Devine receive over 80% of the first preference vote.

== Results ==
East Sydney by-election, 1963
Party	Candidate	Votes	%	±%
Labor	Len Devine	19,704	80.7	+12.9
Independent Liberal	Vernon Luckman	2,233	9.1	+9.1
Independent	Leslie Bond	1,224	5.0	+5.0
Property Owners	Hazen Cook	699	2.9	+2.9
Republican	John Phillips	546	2.2	+2.2
Total formal votes		24,406	94.9	
Informal votes		1,305	5.1	
Turnout		25,711	71.9	
Two-party-preferred result
Labor	Len Devine		85.1	+13.2
Independent Liberal	Vernon Luckman		14.9	+14.9
Labor hold		Swing	+13.2	
