= Bob Carroll =

Bob Carroll may refer to:

- Bob Carroll (author) (1936–2009), sports author and historian
- Bob Carroll (footballer) (1941–2021), Australian rules footballer
- Bob Carroll Jr. (1918–2007), television writer
- Bob Carroll (singer/actor) (1918–1994), singer and stage, television, and film actor
- Bobby Carroll (1938–2016), Scottish football player
- Robert L. Carroll (born 1938), vertebrate paleontologist
- Robert Todd Carroll (1945–2016), writer, academic and skeptic

== See also ==
- Robert Carroll (disambiguation)
