= 1959 Australian Labor Party leadership spill =

1959 Australian Labor Party Leadership spill
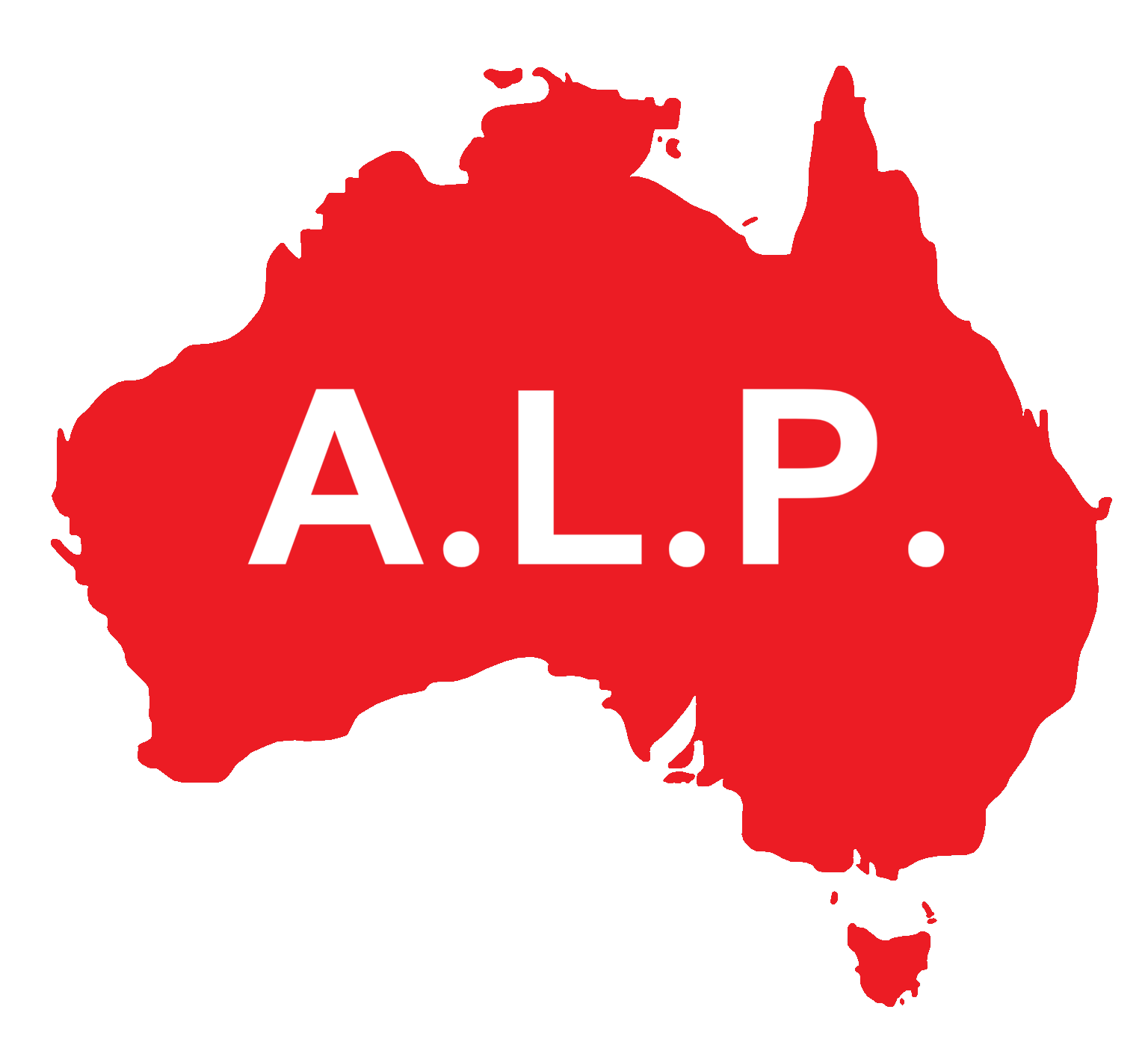
- 16 February 1959
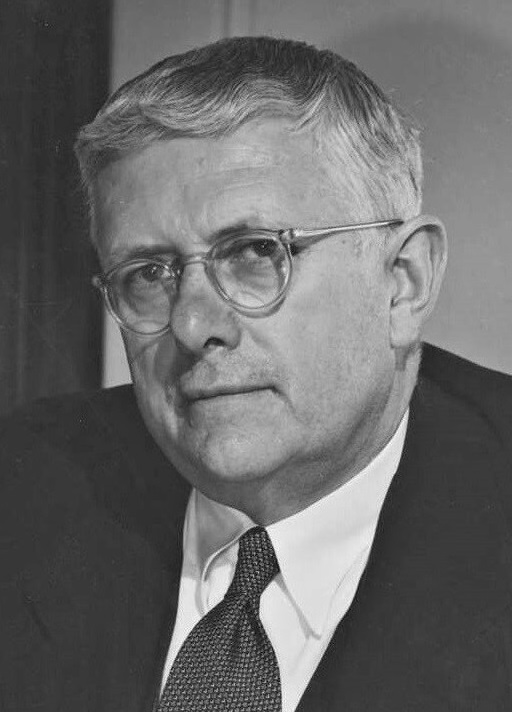

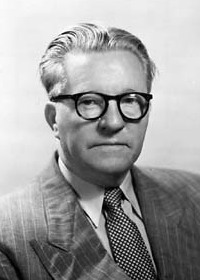
Candidate	H. V. Evatt	Eddie Ward
Caucus vote	46 (59.0%)	32 (41.0%)
Leader before election
H. V. Evatt
Elected Leader
H. V. Evatt

A leadership spill of the Australian Labor Party (ALP), then the opposition party in the Parliament of Australia, was held on 16 February 1959.

== Background ==
Senior Labor left-winger Eddie Ward unsuccessfully challenged ALP leader H. V. Evatt following Evatt's third defeat at the polls in the 1958 election. Evatt was re-elected by a lower than expected margin of only 14 votes. The closeness of the ballot further highlighted the dissatisfaction with Evatt's leadership.

At the same caucus, Arthur Calwell was re-elected as deputy leader unopposed.

== Results ==
The following table gives the ballot results:

Name	Votes	Percentage
H. V. Evatt	46	58.97
Eddie Ward	32	41.03

== See also ==
- 1958 Australian federal election
