= 1932 East Sydney by-election =

6 February 1932
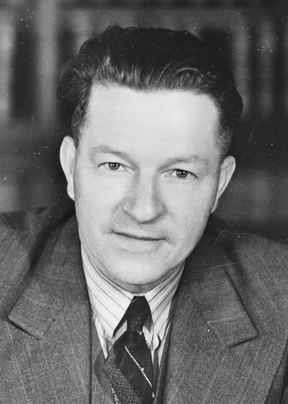

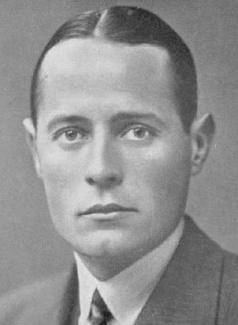
	First party	Second party
Candidate	Eddie Ward	William McCall
Party	Labor (NSW)	United Australia
Popular vote	17,461	16,304
Percentage	47.0%	43.9%
Swing	▲4.6pp	▼0.3pp
TPP	50.2%	49.8%
TPP swing	▲1.9pp	▼1.9pp
MP before election
John Clasby
United Australia
Elected MP
Eddie Ward
Labor (NSW)

A by-election was held for the Australian House of Representatives seat of East Sydney on 6 February 1932. This was triggered by the death of United Australia Party MP John Clasby, who had been elected at the 1931 election and never taken his seat in Parliament.

The by-election was won by New South Wales Labor candidate Eddie Ward, who had previously won the seat in a by-election the previous year but lost it to Clasby at the federal election. The Labor Party had split in New South Wales with Ward adhering to the group headed by Jack Lang, the Premier of New South Wales.

== Results ==
East Sydney by-election, 1932
Party	Candidate	Votes	%	±%
Labor (NSW)	Eddie Ward	17,461	47.0	+4.6
United Australia	William McCall	16,304	43.9	−0.3
Labor	Lou Cunningham	2,817	7.6	−5.7
Communist	Jack Miles	597	1.6	+1.6
Total formal votes		37,179	97.3	
Informal votes		1,018	2.7	
Turnout		38,197	85.6	
Two-party-preferred result
Labor (NSW)	Eddie Ward	18,676	50.2	+1.9
United Australia	William McCall	18,503	49.8	−1.9
Labor (NSW) gain from United Australia		Swing	+1.9	
