= 1931 East Sydney by-election =

7 March 1931
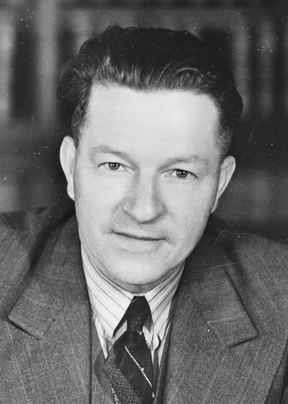

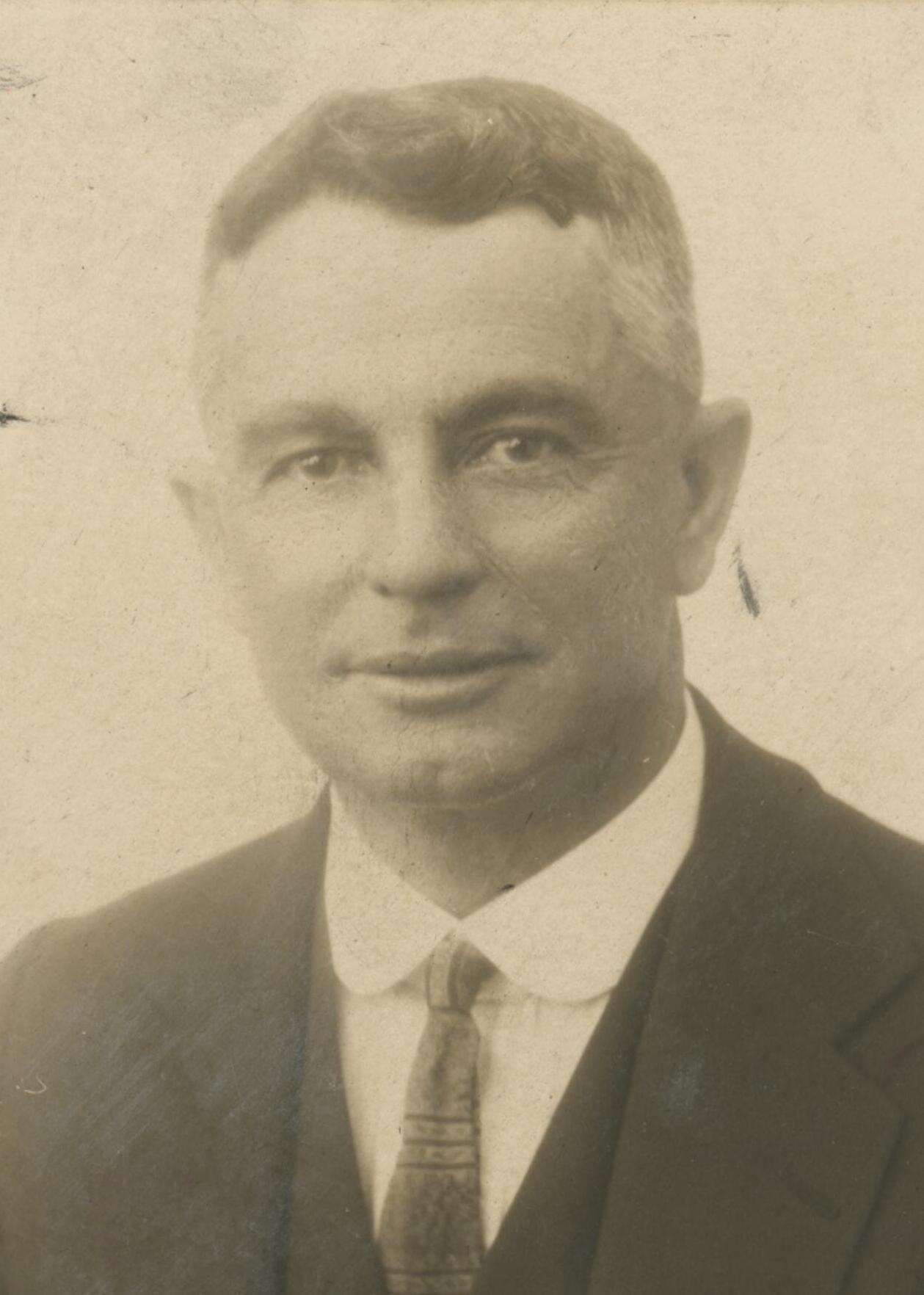
	First party	Second party
Candidate	Eddie Ward	Lionel Courtenay
Party	Labor	Nationalist
Popular vote	19,975	16,333
Percentage	54.1%	44.2%
Swing	▼14.3pp	▲12.6pp
TPP	55.7%	44.3%
TPP swing	▼14.3pp	▲14.3pp
MP before election
John West
Labor
Elected MP
Eddie Ward
Labor

A by-election was held for the Australian House of Representatives seat of East Sydney on 7 March 1931. This was triggered by the death of Labor MP John West.

The by-election was won by Labor candidate Eddie Ward, who was associated with New South Wales Premier Jack Lang's wing of the party.

This was the last by-election contested by the Nationalist Party as it would be replaced by the United Australia Party later that year.

== Candidate selection ==
Businessman and Sydney alderman Lionel Courtenay won Nationalist preselection for the by-election in February 1931, defeating fourteen other candidates including barrister Norman Cowper, former MLA's James Morrish and Thomas Morrow, former Australian cricket captain Monty Noble, and aviator Keith Smith.

== Results ==
East Sydney by-election, 1931
Party	Candidate	Votes	%	±%
Labor	Eddie Ward	19,975	54.1	−14.3
Nationalist	Lionel Courtenay	16,333	44.2	+12.6
Communist	Bill Mountjoy	611	1.7	+1.7
Total formal votes		36,919	97.2	
Informal votes		1,068	2.8	
Turnout		37,987	81.3	
Two-party-preferred result
Labor	Eddie Ward		55.7	−14.3
Nationalist	Lionel Courtenay		44.3	+14.3
Labor hold		Swing	−14.3	
