= William McCall (politician) =

Australian politician

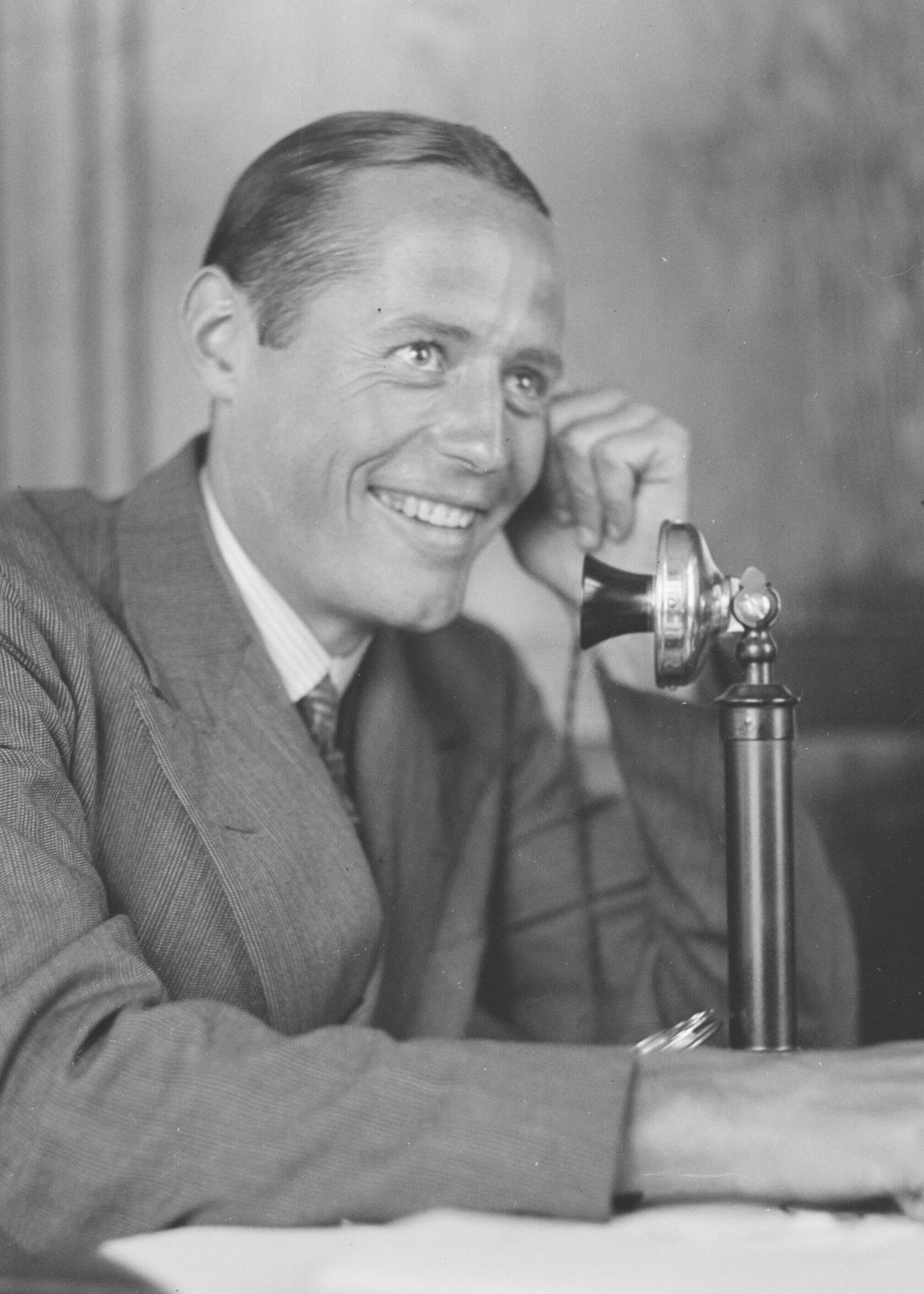
- McCall in 1933

Member of the Australian Parliament for Martin
- In office 15 September 1934 – 21 August 1943
- Preceded by: William Holman
- Succeeded by: Fred Daly

Personal details
- Born: 24 May 1908 Chatswood, New South Wales
- Died: 19 August 1968 (aged 60) Pittwater, New South Wales
- Party: United Australia Party
- Spouses: Georgina Dart (m. 1934; died 1961) Mavis Dearing (m. 1962)
- Occupation: Businessman

William Victor "Big Bill" McCall (24 May 1908 – 19 August 1968) was an Australian politician and businessman. He was a member of the United Australia Party (UAP) and held the seat of Martin in the House of Representatives from 1934 to 1943.

== Early life ==
McCall was born on 24 May 1908 in Chatswood, New South Wales. He was the second child born to Hilda Mary (née Bowman) and William James McCall; his father was a bank officer. McCall attended Sydney Grammar School, leaving in 1924 following his father's death. He subsequently entered business as a skin-trade and wool-buyer.

== Politics ==
McCall became involved in politics at the age of 17, when he volunteered as an orator for the National Association. His decision to seek a parliamentary seat was prompted by the difficulties businesses experienced during the Great Depression. In 1931, he attempted to gain pre-selection for the federal seat of Martin for the United Australia Party (UAP), losing to William Holman. The following year, he won UAP preselection for the 1932 East Sydney by-election, caused by the death of his friend John Clasby. He lost to Lang Labor's Eddie Ward by only 173 votes.

Following Holman's death in 1934, 26-year-old McCall was selected to run for Martin. He had gained a reputation as an impressive public speaker, and was elected to Australian House of Representatives for Martin in the elections of that year. He was also elected to Sydney Municipal Council in 1935.

McCall was generally supportive of the government of his party leader Joseph Lyons, but became the leader of a back-bench revolt against Thomas Paterson's ruling in 1936 that Mabel Freer could not enter Australia. He was successful in persuading the government to reverse the decision, after revealing Paterson's mishandling of the case. In 1938 he enlisted in the Militia; he was commissioned in 1939 and in 1940 transferred to the Reserve of Officers. He supported an "all-out" effort during World War II against both Germany and Japan.

McCall, together with several other government back-benchers, became disillusioned with the leadership of Prime Minister Robert Menzies, and was disappointed when Menzies failed to form an all-party government with the Australian Labor Party after the 1940 election. On 28 August 1941, he declared that unless Menzies resigned, he would ensure that the government's majority in the House was removed. Menzies resigned the following day.

In the 1943 election, McCall was defeated as part of the Labor landslide that brought John Curtin to the premiership, losing to Fred Daly. He became a real estate agent, and in 1967 created a sensation when he offered almost $2 million for a site in Martin Place, Sydney.

== Later life ==
In 1954, McCall succeeded Arthur Moore as chairman of Coca-Cola Bottlers (Sydney) Pty Ltd. At the time of his appointment he was also a director of Australian Provincial Assurance Association Ltd.

== Personal life ==
McCall married Georgina Bessie Dart at Chatswood on 6 June 1934. He was widowed in 1961; on 24 October the following year, he married secretary Mavis Michele Dearing. Together with his chauffeur, McCall left Pittwater on 19 August 1968 in his speedboat; the vessel was found upturned and abandoned the next day near Collaroy, and the two men were presumed drowned. McCall was survived by his wife and daughter, together with the son and daughter of his first marriage.

Although reputedly a millionaire, McCall left an estate of $60,000 (equivalent to $810,000 in 2022).

Parliament of Australia
Preceded by William Holman	Member for Martin; 1934–1943	Succeeded by Fred Daly
