= Lionel Courtenay =

Australian politician (1879–1935)

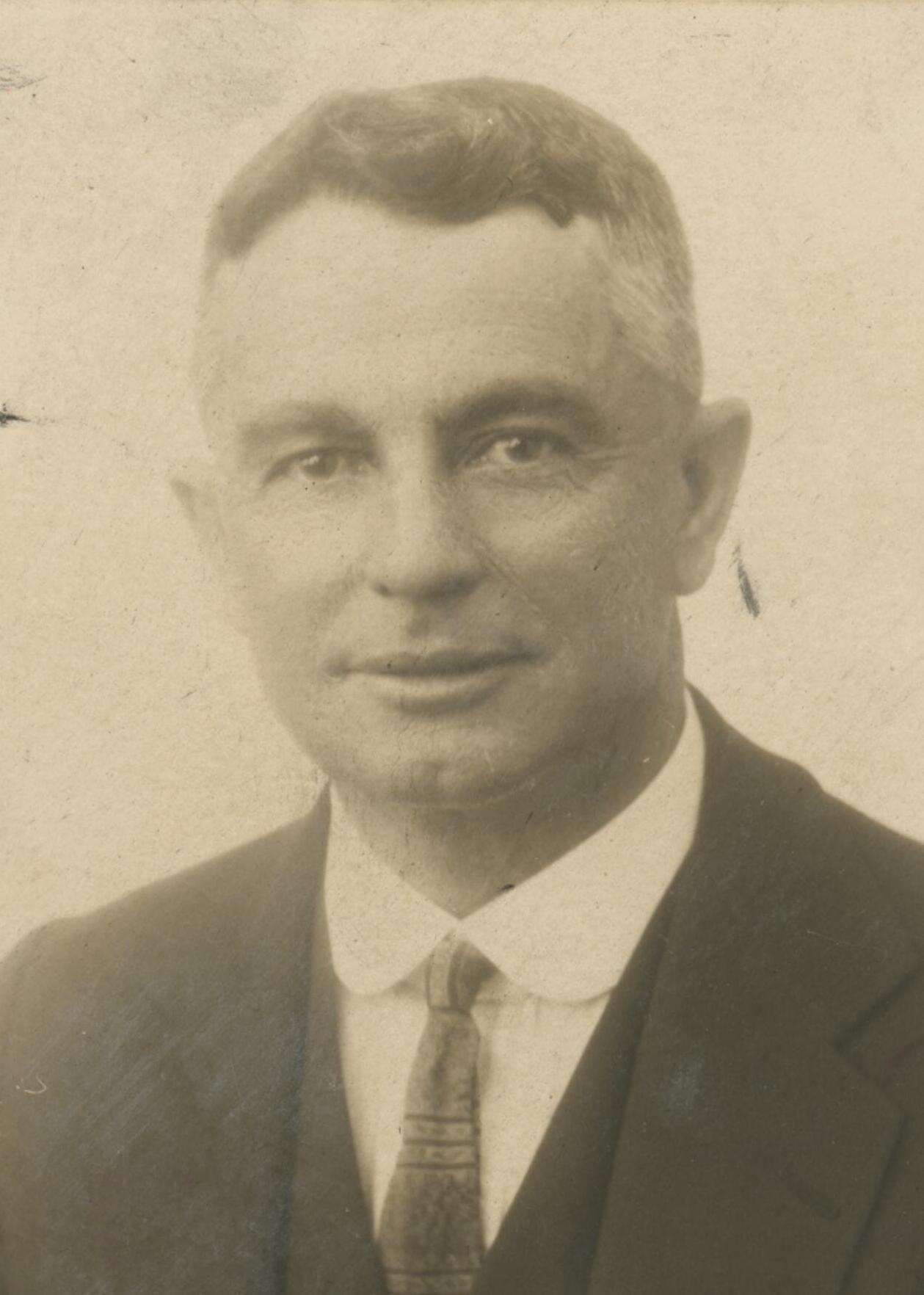

Senator for New South Wales
- In office 1 July 1935 – 11 July 1935
- Succeeded by: Guy Arkins

Member of the New South Wales Legislative Council
- In office 8 September 1932 – 8 August 1934

Personal details
- Born: 1 December 1879 Balmain, New South Wales, Australia
- Died: 11 July 1935 (aged 55) Willoughby, New South Wales, Australia
- Party: Labor (to 1916); Nationalist (1916–1931); UAP (from 1931)
- Spouse: Anne Lee (m. 1902)
- Occupation: Businessman

Lionel Thomas Courtenay (1 December 1879 – 11 July 1935) was an Australian businessman and politician. Born in Sydney, he left school at a young age but became general manager of an engineering company. He was involved in local politics, sitting on Mascot Council, Mosman Council and Sydney City Council. In 1932, he was elected to the New South Wales Legislative Council as a member of the United Australia Party. He left the Council in 1934 to contest the Australian Senate as a UAP candidate for New South Wales, in which he was successful. However, he died on 11 July 1935, 11 days after he formally became a Senator, necessitating the appointment of Guy Arkins to replace him.

== Early life ==
Courtenay was born on 1 December 1879 in Balmain, New South Wales, the son of Catherine (née Gleeson) and Lionel Lewis Courtenay. His mother was born in Ireland, while his father, an engineer, was born in England. He attended Gardeners Road Public School in Rosebery.

== Business career ==
Courtenay left school at the age of fourteen and began working as a messenger boy for J Tylor & Sons, a sanitary and hydraulic engineering firm. He was later promoted to travelling salesman, eventually becoming general manager of the Australian division and securing an ownership stake. Outside of Tylors, Courtenay helped establish the NRMA in February 1920, serving as the inaugural treasurer but resigning within the year to protest staff reductions. He was also a director of radio station 2SM.

== Politics ==
=== Local government ===
In 1906, Courtenay was elected to the North Botany Borough Council, serving as an alderman until 1910. He later served on the Mascot Municipal Council (1914–1916), the Mosman Municipal Council (1917–1922), and the Sydney City Council (1921–1927). He was a long-serving member of the executive of the Local Government Association of New South Wales, serving as president for two years and a councillor and vice-president of the Town Planning Association. In 1920 he helped establish the Civic Reform Association to support non-Labor candidates in local government elections.

=== State and federal politics ===
Courtenay was a member of the Australian Labor Party (ALP) until the 1916 party split over conscription, when he joined the newly formed Nationalist Party. In 1917 he was a delegate to the national conference of the Australian National Federation in Melbourne.

Courtenay was the Nationalist Party's candidate at the 1931 East Sydney by-election to the House of Representatives, losing to ALP candidate Eddie Ward. He defeated fourteen other candidates for UAP preselection. In the same year Courtenay joined the new United Australia Party. In September 1932 he was appointed to the New South Wales Legislative Council, at the time a lifetime appointment. Following a constitutional amendment, he was re-elected to the council in November 1933 but resigned in August 1934 to contest the 1934 federal election.

Courtenay was elected to a Senate term beginning on 1 July 1935, polling the second-highest number of votes in New South Wales. Already ill at the time of the election, he died after the start of his term but before taking his seat.

== Personal life ==
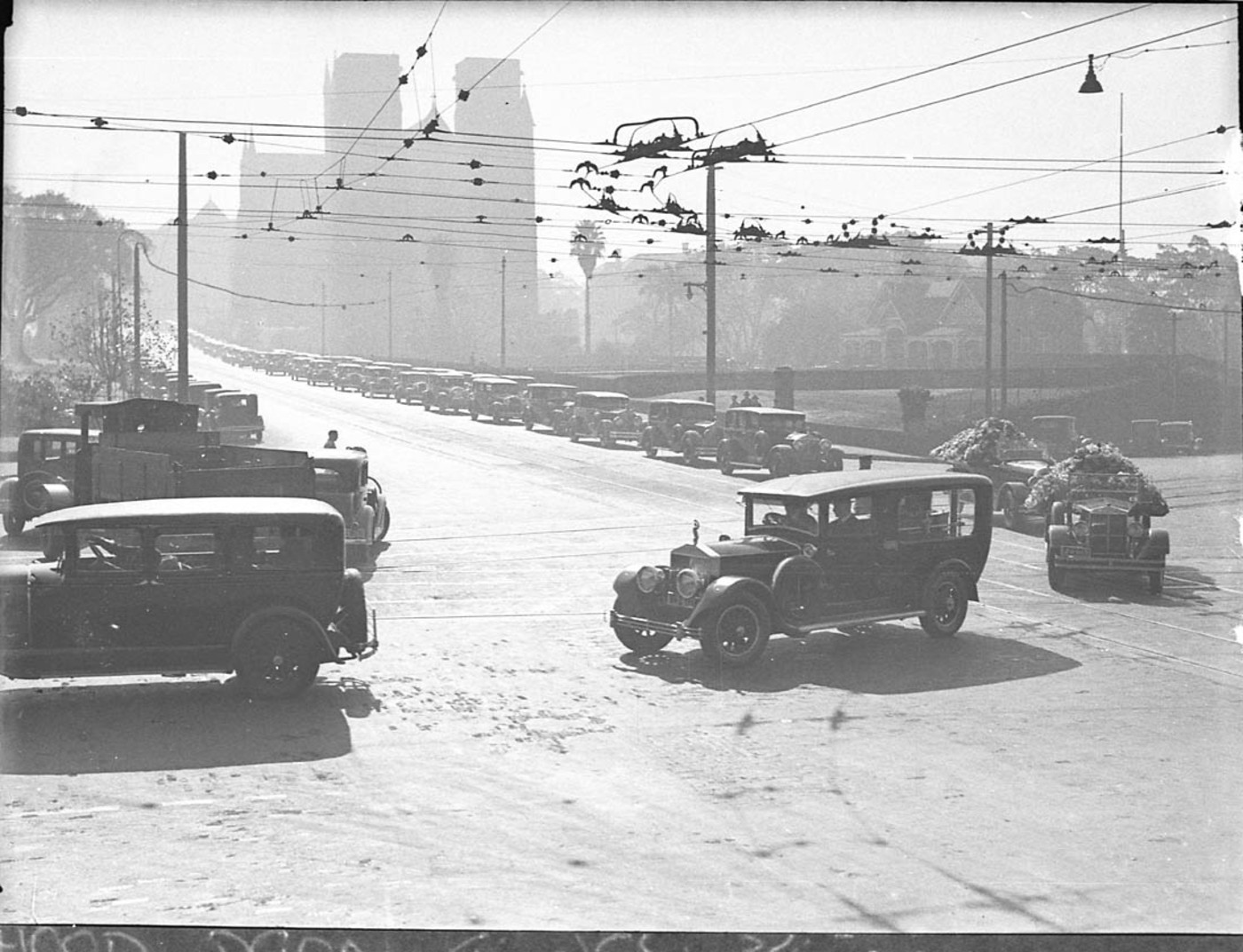
Courtenay's funeral cortège

Courtenay married dressmaker Anne Elizabeth Lee in 1902, with whom he had six children. He died at his home in Willoughby on 11 July 1935, aged 55. He was interred at Rookwood Cemetery.

After being diagnosed with terminal cancer, Courtenay offered to donate his body to medical research, either for medical experimentation during the remainder of his life or for post-mortem examination. The offer was made to former prime minister Billy Hughes, the federal minister for health, who stated that it was "a tragedy that no sooner had he achieved the summit of his ambition, when the portals of a wide political life were opening to him, than he fell upon the threshold". John Cumpston, the director-general of health, accepted Courtenay's offer and directed that a post-mortem examination be performed to aid knowledge of metastatic cancer.
