= Bobby Carroll =

Scottish footballer

Personal information
- Full name: Robert Carroll
- Date of birth: 13 May 1938
- Place of birth: Glasgow, Scotland
- Date of death: 11 May 2016 (aged 77)
- Position: Outside right

Youth career
- 1957–1959: Irvine Meadow

Senior career*
Years	Team	Apps	(Gls)
1957–1963	Celtic	61	(21)
1963–1965	St Mirren	55	(19)
1965–1967	Dundee United	2	(0)
1967	Coleraine		
1968	Queen of the South	12	(6)
Total		130	(46)

International career
1962	SFL trial v SFA	1	(1)
- * Club domestic league appearances and goals

Robert Carroll (13 May 1938 – 11 May 2016) was a Scottish footballer who played for Celtic, St Mirren, Dundee United, Coleraine and Queen of the South. He was Celtic's first ever goalscorer in European competition.

== Playing career ==
Carroll provisionally signed for Celtic on 22 September 1957 from junior club Irvine Meadow; however, he was left with Irvine Meadow for season 1958–59, during which he scored 75 goals resulting in him being voted Junior Player of the Year in 1959. On 15 May 1959, Bobby received his trophy at the George Cinema in Bank Street from the Provost George Donaldson and won the Scottish Junior Cup on 16 May 1959. He was subsequently called into the Celtic first team as one of the so-called 'Kelly's Kids', after the then Celtic Chairman Bob Kelly, where he made his debut in a 2-1 League Cup defeat at home against Partick Thistle on 12 August 1959.

On 26 September 1962, Carroll was part of the Celtic team that travelled to Mestalla Stadium for the first leg of an Inter-Cities Fairs Cup tie against Valencia (this competition being a predecessor of the current UEFA Europa League). Valencia were holders of the cup and won the tie 4–2, with Carroll scoring both of the Celtic goals, making him the first Celtic player to score a goal in European competition.

Carroll signed for St Mirren in 1963 remaining there until 1965. In the league he made 55 appearances and scored 19 goals. He then joined Dundee United, scoring on his debut against Celtic on 14 August 1965. After 6 appearances he soon dropped out of first team contention but spent two seasons at the club, playing over 50 times for the reserves. He was released in April 1967. He joined Coleraine in Northern Ireland, then later in season 1967-68 also played for Queen of the South. In his 12 league appearances for Queens he scored 6 goals. He then left senior football by returning to Irvine Meadow.

Carroll died on 11 May 2016, two days before what would have been his 78th birthday.
