= Robert Carroll (Australian politician) =

Australian politician

The Hon Bob Carroll

Member of the Queensland Legislative Council
- In office 19 February 1920 – 23 March 1922

Personal details
- Born: Robert Joseph Carroll; 16 June 1877 Dublin, Ireland
- Died: 7 February 1940 (aged 62) Brisbane, Queensland, Australia
- Party: Labor
- Spouse: Edith Maude Robinson (m.1904 d.1952)
- Occupation: State organiser, Australian Labor Party, marine engineer

Robert Joseph Carroll (16 June 1877 – 7 February 1940) was an Australian politician. He was a Labor member of the Queensland Legislative Council from 1920 until its abolition in 1922.
