= Bob Carroll (footballer) =

Australian rules footballer (1941–2021)

Personal information
- Full name: Robert Carroll
- Born: 18 October 1941
- Died: 5 October 2021 (aged 79); Florida, USA
- Height: 185 cm (6 ft 1 in)
- Weight: 79 kg (174 lb)

Playing career^{1}
Years	Club	Games (Goals)
1961–64	Melbourne	14 (7)
1965	Hawthorn	4 (0)
1965–66	Fitzroy	9 (1)
Total		27 (8)
- ^{1} Playing statistics correct to the end of 1966.

Robert Carroll (18 October 1941 – 5 October 2021) was an Australian rules footballer who played with Melbourne, Hawthorn and Fitzroy in the Victorian Football League (VFL).
