= Len Devine =

Australian politician

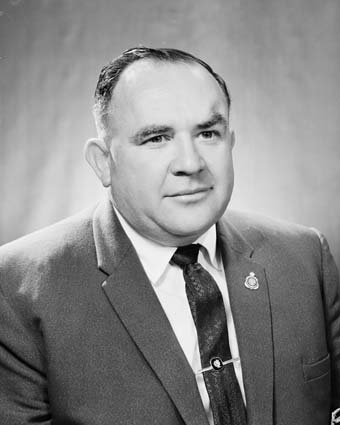

Member of the Australian Parliament for East Sydney
- In office 28 September 1963 – 29 September 1969
- Preceded by: Eddie Ward
- Succeeded by: Seat abolished

Personal details
- Born: 14 October 1923
- Died: 29 May 2008 (aged 84)
- Party: Australian Labor Party

Leonard Thomas Devine (14 October 1923 – 29 May 2008) was an Australian politician.

Raised and educated in Sydney he was the Health Inspector for Sydney City Council before serving in World War II from 1942 to 1945. On his return he became a taxi-driver and alderman on Sydney City Council. In 1963, he was elected to the Australian House of Representatives as the Labor member for East Sydney. Devine held the seat until its abolition in 1969, when he retired. He died in 2008.

Parliament of Australia
Preceded by Eddie Ward	Member for East Sydney; 1963–1969	Succeeded by Seat abolished
