= 1934 Australian federal election =

- 15 September 1934

All 75 (Note: The Northern Territory had one seat, but members for the territories did not have full voting rights until 1966 and did not count toward government formation.) seats of the Australian House of Representatives 38 seats were needed for a majority in the House 18 (of the 36) seats of the Australian Senate
- Registered: 3,902,677 ▲6.92%
- Turnout: 3,677,723 (95.17%) (Note: Turnout in contested seats) (▲0.13 pp)
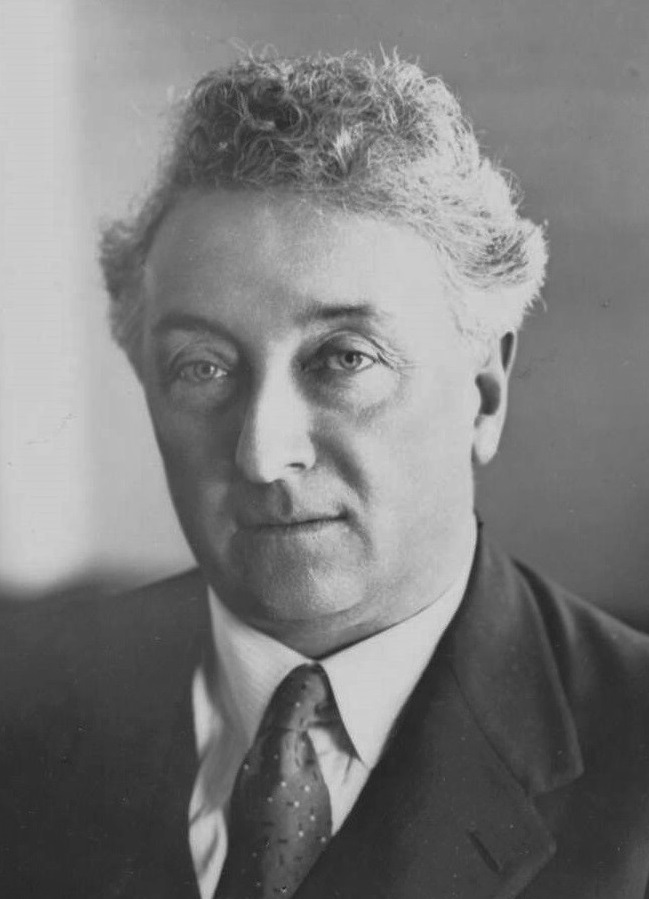

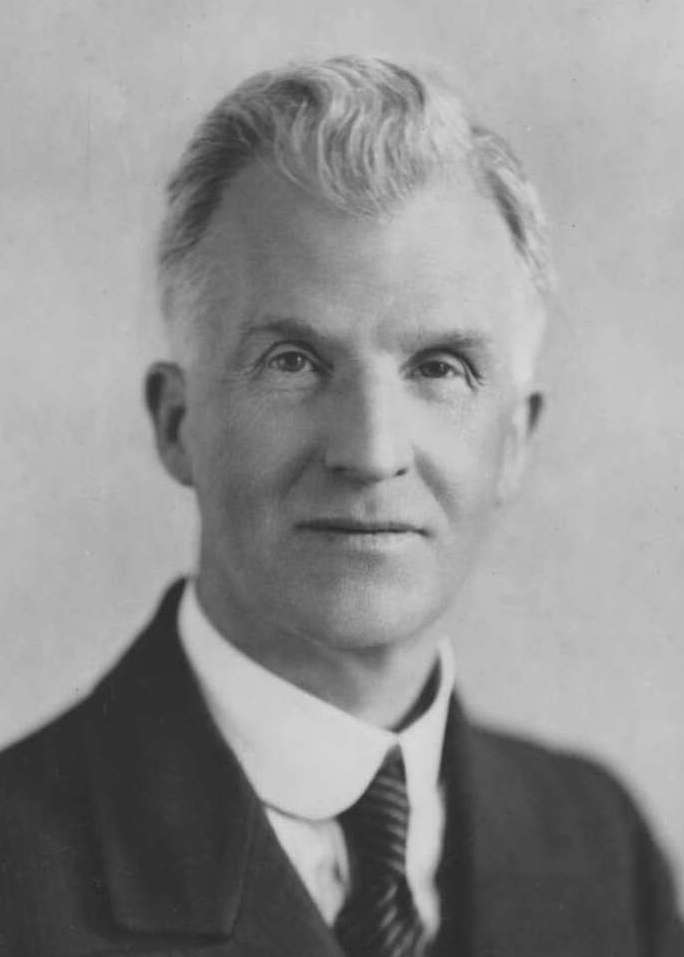

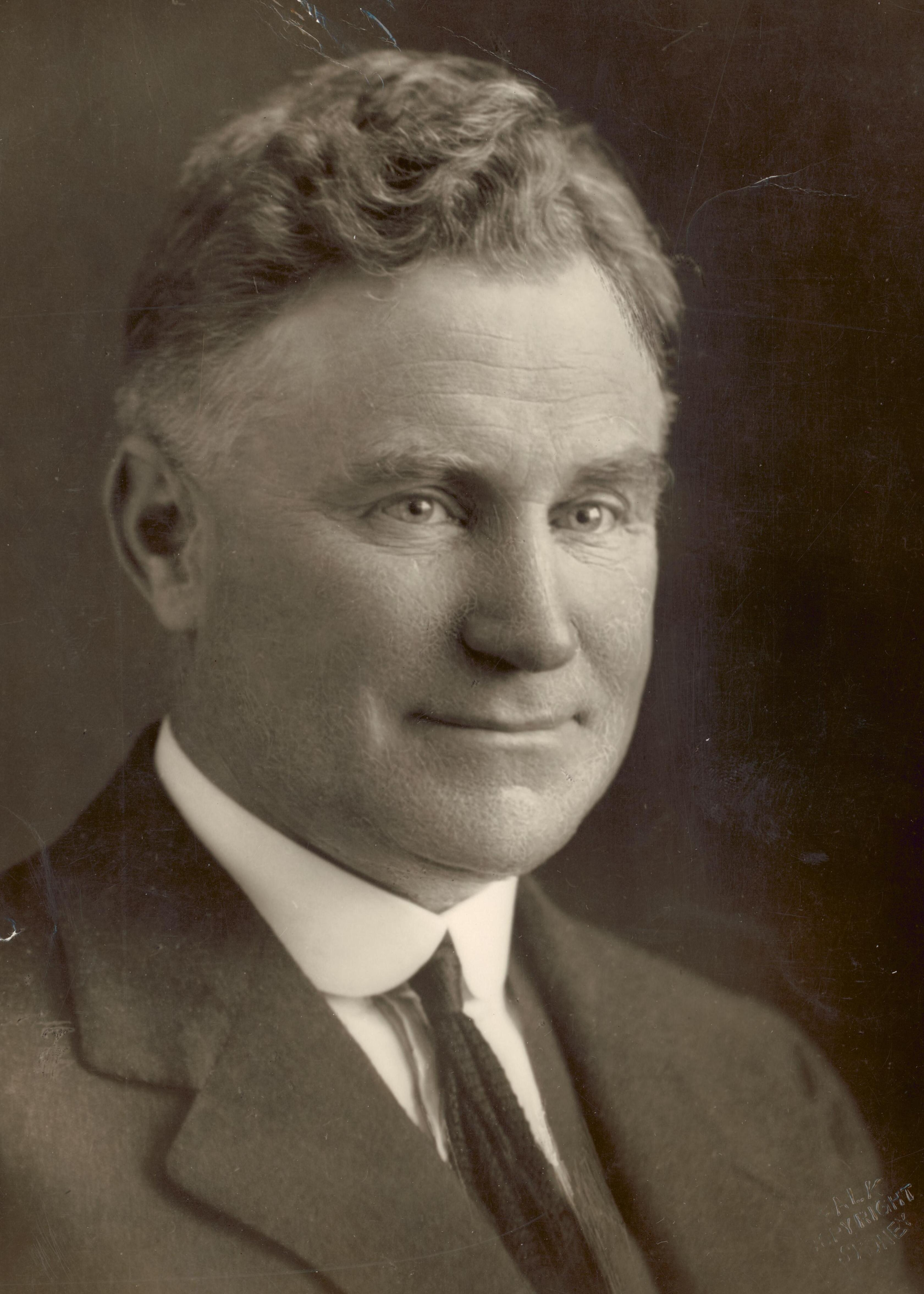

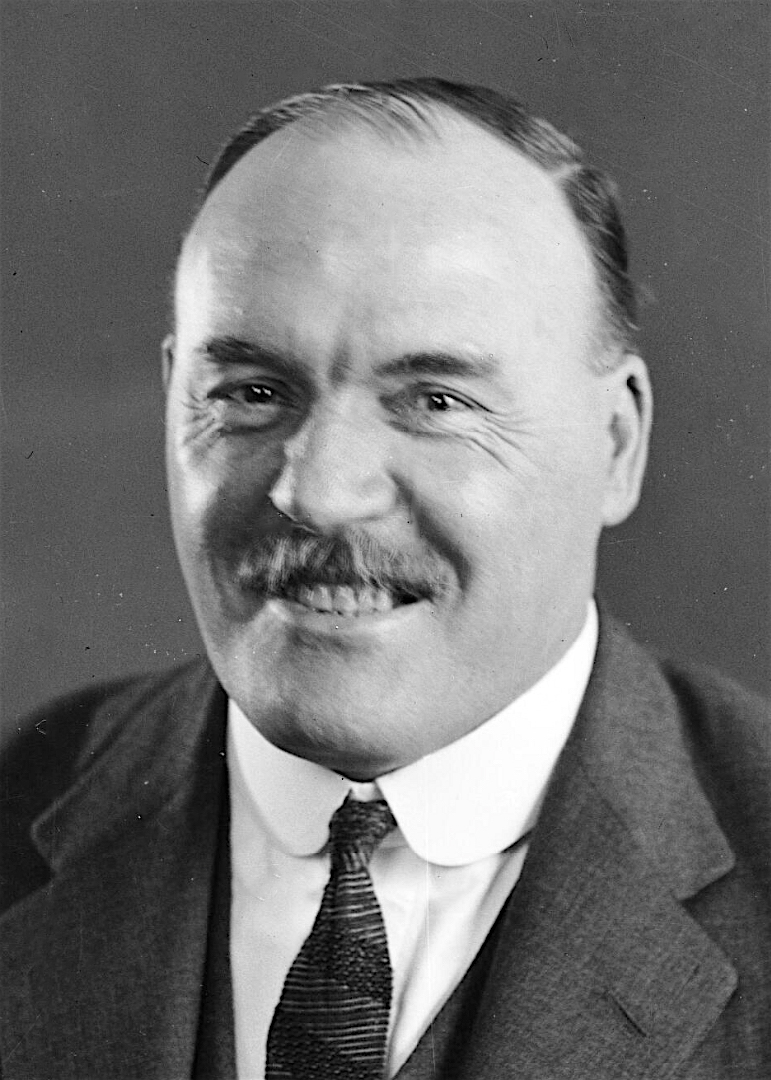
	First party	Second party
Leader	Joseph Lyons	James Scullin
Party	United Australia	Labor
Leader since	7 May 1931	26 April 1928
Leader's seat	Wilmot (Tas.)	Yarra (Vic.)
Last election	38 seats	16 seats
Seats won	32	18
Seat change	▼6	▲2
First preference vote	1,287,963	953,101
Percentage	36.25%	26.82%
Swing	▼5.53%	▼0.20%
	Third party	Fourth party
Leader	Earle Page	Jack Lang
Party	Country	Lang Labor
Leader since	5 April 1921	31 July 1923
Leader's seat	Cowper (NSW)	Did not run
Last election	16 seats	4 seats
Seats won	15	9
Seat change	▼1	▲5
First preference vote	480,279	510,480
Percentage	13.52%	14.37%
Swing	▲1.31%	▲3.83%
- Results by division for the House of Representatives, shaded by winning party's margin of victory.
Prime Minister before election
Joseph Lyons
United Australia
Subsequent Prime Minister
Joseph Lyons
United Australia

The 1934 Australian federal election was held in Australia on 15 September 1934. All 74 seats in the House of Representatives, and 18 of the 36 seats in the Senate were up for election. The incumbent United Australia Party led by Prime Minister of Australia Joseph Lyons formed a minority government, with 33 out of 74 seats in the House.

The opposition Australian Labor Party (ALP) led by James Scullin saw its share of the primary (first preference) vote fall to an even lower number than in the 1931 election, due to the Lang Labor split. However, it was able to pick up an extra four seats on preferences and therefore improve on its position.

Almost two months after the election, the UAP entered into a coalition with the Country Party, led by Earle Page.

Future Prime Ministers Robert Menzies and John McEwen both entered parliament at this election.

== Background ==
UAP leader Joseph Lyons formed a UAP-only ministry after the 1931 federal election, with the Country Party excluded from cabinet but providing qualified support during the parliamentary term.

The first term of the Lyons government was marked by conflict with state governments over federal–state relations and the continuing response to the Great Depression in Australia. The 1932 New South Wales constitutional crisis culminated in the dismissal of state premier Jack Lang, following a confrontation with the federal government over state debts. In Western Australia, a secession referendum was held in 1933 and resulted in a large majority in favour of secession, despite the pro-federation campaigning of Lyons and George Pearce. The results of the referendum were not implemented.

== Campaign ==
The election campaign focused on economic matters, particularly the banking industry. Lyons and the UAP promised to maintain their orthodox financial policies and provide larger grants to the states for unemployment relief and rural subsidies. The Labor Party promised banking and monetary reform, additional tariff protection for industry, and reversal of the remaining austerity measures made under the Premiers' Plan.

The UAP received significant funding from the banking industry, which was concerned by proposals for bank nationalisation or "socialisation of credit" that enjoyed strong support from the Labor Party, Social Credit Party and factions of the Country Party. In February 1934, a committee of major bank executives was formed to develop a nationwide publicity campaign against bank nationalisation. Funding was provided to front organisations, including the Sound Finance League of Australia and the Sane Finance League, to place newspaper advertisements, distribute pamphlets and sponsor radio segments.

During the election campaign, both Page and Scullin announced their support for a royal commission or other independent inquiry into the banking industry. Lyons "reluctantly" announced the UAP would do likewise, with a royal commission eventually convened in 1935 with cross-party representation.

== Results ==
The UAP won 32 out of 74 seats in the House of Representatives, with a small swing against the party. Of the remaining seats eighteen were won by the official Labor Party, fifteen by the Country Party, and nine by Lang Labor.

The 1934 election has been identified as the "electoral summit" of the social credit movement in Australia, with the Douglas Credit Party (or Social Credit Party) polling 4.7 percent of the vote in the House of Representatives. Its performance was strongest in Tasmania, where its straight-out candidates polled 11.6 percent and several Labor Party candidates were cross-endorsed by the Douglas Social Credit Association. In Lyons' seat of Wilmot, the Labor Party did not field a candidate and the two Social Credit candidates (including former Labor minister William Laird Smith) polled 42.5 percent of the vote.

=== House of Representatives ===
House of Reps (IRV) — 1934–37—Turnout 95.17% (CV) — Informal 3.44%
Party	First preference votes	%	Swing	Seats	Change
United Australia	1,287,963	36.25	−5.53	32	−6
Labor	953,101	26.82	−0.20	18	+2
Lang Labor	510,480	14.37	+3.83	9	+5
Country	480,279	13.52	+1.31	15	−1
Social Credit	166,589	4.69	+4.69	0	0
Communist	47,499	1.34	+1.08	0	0
Independents	107,335	3.02	−5.17	1 (Note: Including Northern Territory)	−1
Total	3,553,246			75	−1

First preference vote
United Australia	36.25%
Labor	26.82%
Lang Labor	14.37%
Country	13.52%
Social Credit	4.69%
Independent	3.02%
Communist	1.34%

Parliament seats
United Australia	42.67%
Labor	24.00%
Country	20.00%
Lang Labor	12.00%
Independent	1.33%

=== Senate ===
Senate (P BV) — 1934–37—Turnout 95.03% (CV) — Informal 11.35%
Party	First preference votes	%	Swing	Seats won	Seats held	Change
Labor	923,151	28.08	−1.18	0	3	−7
United Australia	679,422	20.66	−4.59	10	26	+5
UAP/Country (Joint Ticket)	599,723	18.24	−11.92	6		
Country	470,283	14.30	*	2	7	+2
Lang Labor	435,045	13.23	+1.12	0	0	0
Social Credit	91,596	2.79	*	0	0	0
Communist	73,506	2.24	+1.30	0	0	0
Independents	15,105	0.46	−1.81	0	0	0
Total	3,287,831			18	36	

== Seats changing hands ==
Seat	Pre-1934			Swing	Post-1934		
Seat	Party	Member	Margin	Swing	Margin	Member	Party
Barker, SA	United Australia	Malcolm Cameron	N/A	6.4	18.7	Archie Cameron	Country
Bass, Tas	United Australia	Allan Guy	14.5	14.8	0.3	Claude Barnard	Labor
Batman, Vic	United Australia	Samuel Dennis	14.5	14.8	0.3	Frank Brennan	Labor
Corangamite, Vic	Country	William Gibson	N/A	7.2	15.7	Geoffrey Street	United Australia
Darling, NSW	Labor	Arthur Blakeley	N/A	63.5	13.5	Joe Clark	Lang Labor
Denison, Tas	United Australia	Arthur Hutchin	5.0	5.3	0.3	Gerald Mahoney	Labor
Franklin, Tas	United Australia	Archibald Blacklow	13.0	15.4	2.4	Charles Frost	Labor
Fremantle, WA	United Australia	William Watson	5.5	6.6	1.1	John Curtin	Labor
Maribyrnong, Vic	United Australia	James Fenton	0.4	7.1	6.7	Arthur Drakeford	Labor
Northern Territory, NT	Labor	H. G. Nelson	N/A	7.5	1.8	Adair Blain	Independent
Werriwa, NSW	Country	Walter McNicoll	1.7	3.2	2.5	Bert Lazzarini	Lang Labor

- Members listed in italics did not contest their seat at this election.

== Government formation ==
Lyons attempted to continue governing in minority after the election, forming another ministry comprised solely of UAP members. When parliament resumed in October 1934, Page and the Country Party threatened to vote against an adjournment motion for the Melbourne Cup as a tactic to force Lyons into negotiations on a joint ministry along the lines of the Bruce–Page government of the 1920s. A joint ministry was sworn in on 9 November 1934, with the Country Party securing four positions in cabinet and Page again becoming de facto deputy prime minister..

== See also ==
- Candidates of the 1934 Australian federal election
- Members of the Australian House of Representatives, 1934–1937
- Members of the Australian Senate, 1935–1938
