= John West (Australian politician) =

Australian politician (1852–1931)

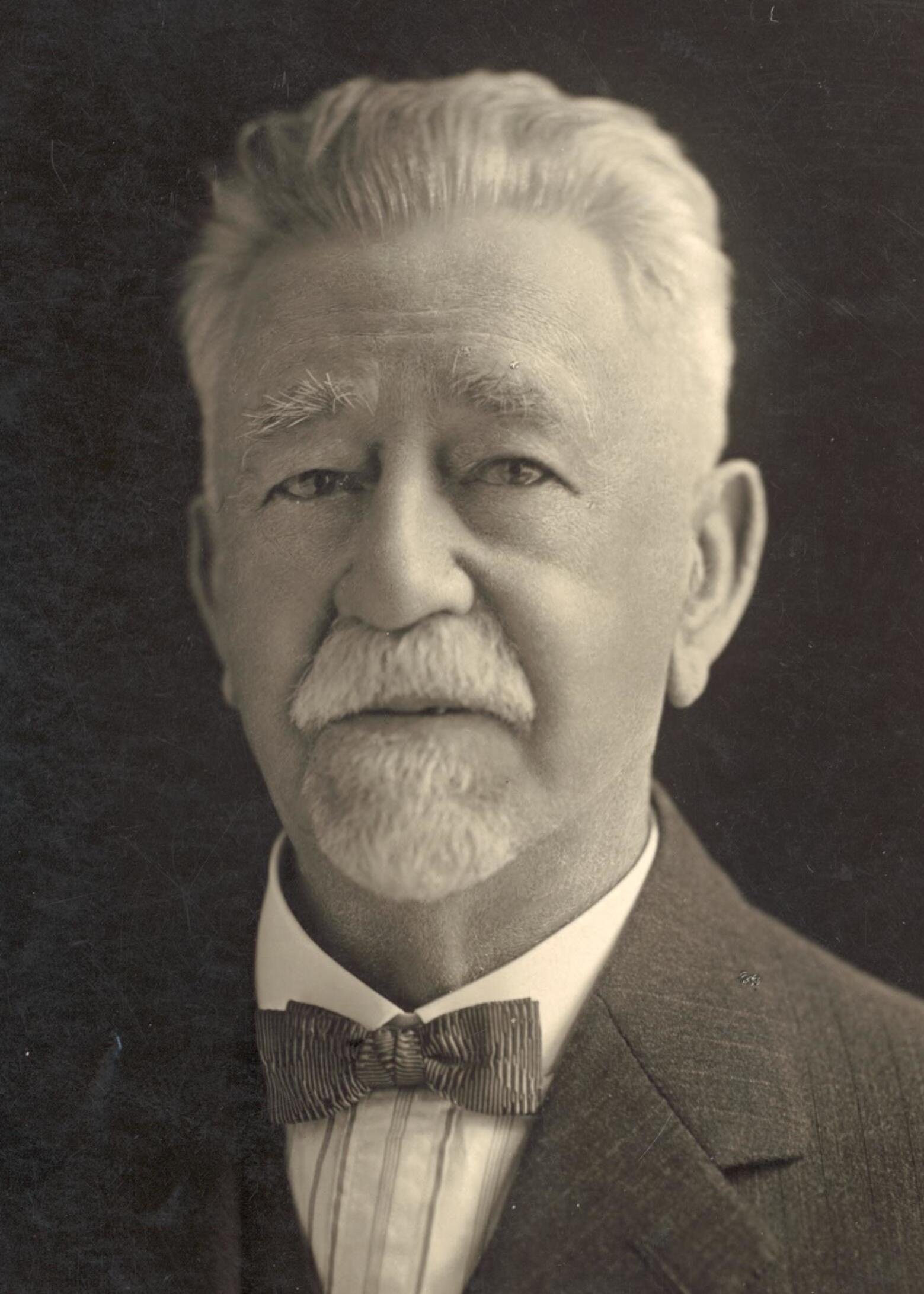

Member of the Australian Parliament for East Sydney
- In office 13 April 1910 – 5 February 1931
- Preceded by: George Reid
- Succeeded by: Eddie Ward

Personal details
- Born: 27 January 1852 Lambeth, London, England
- Died: 5 February 1931 (aged 79) Darlinghurst, New South Wales
- Party: Australian Labor Party
- Spouse: Susannah Sarah Metcalfe
- Occupation: Unionist, plumber

John Edward West (27 January 1852 – 5 February 1931) was an English-born Australian trade unionist and politician, and a key figure in the establishment of the Australian Labor Party.

== Early life ==
West was born on 27 January 1852 at Lambeth in London to brass finisher John Edward West and Elizabeth Ann, née Hearne. Apprenticed to a plumber, he was associated with the Ancient Order of Foresters from the age of 17. He married Susannah Sarah Metcalfe on 18 March 1874 at Holborn; the couple visited New Zealand and in 1875 settled at Paddington in Sydney. The couple had seven daughters and two sons.

== Trade unionism ==
West established himself as a plumber and by 1879 had founded the Operative Plumbers' Society. A delegate to the Trades and Labor Council the following year, he became its secretary in 1880 and president 1887–1907. As such, he was a key figure in the rise of the Labor movement and the establishment of the Australian Labor Party.

West had been a supporter of the Commonwealth Constitution at the Intercolonial Trade Union congresses after 1879, but did not stand for the first federal Parliament. He was a vigorous supporter of the eight-hour day, despite the fact that he was an employer himself. He attempted to enter Parliament by standing against George Reid in East Sydney in 1906, but was unsuccessful; the following year he contested the New South Wales Legislative Assembly seat of King, again unsuccessfully. He again contested East Sydney in 1910, and won.

== Federal politics ==
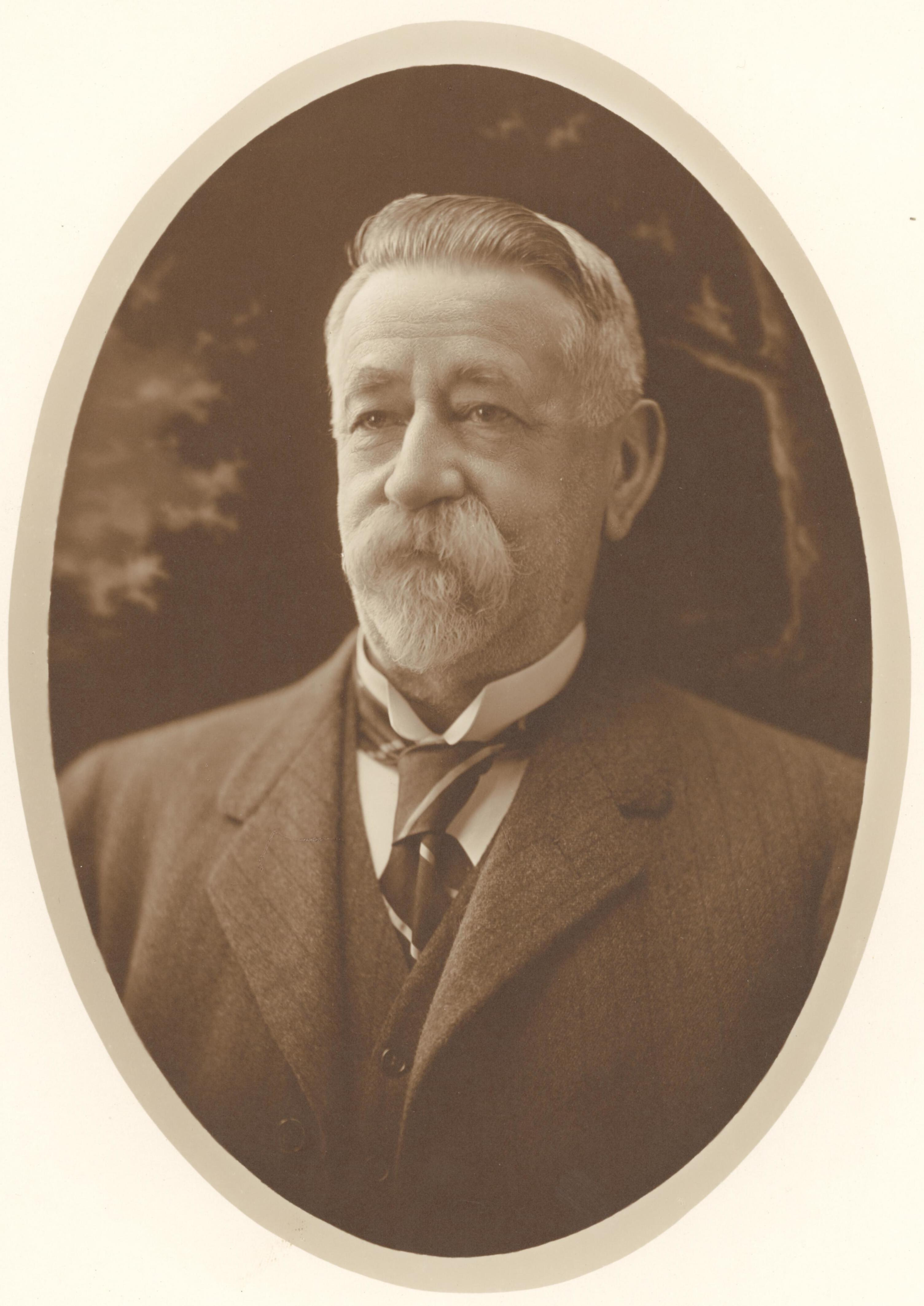
Portrait by Broothorn Studios

West continued with his union commitments in parliament, and spent his political career on the back bench. He criticised the government of Stanley Bruce and Earle Page for slow progress in constructing the temporary parliament house in Canberra, and also became known for his advocacy of the Australian flag appearing on all Commonwealth office buildings, his opposition of Tom Walsh and Jacob Johnson's deportation, and his argument that the association of Labor with "Bolshevism and Communism was moonshine".

West died at midnight on 5 February 1931 at his home in Darlinghurst, survived by his nine children. A bronze memorial in his honour at the Sydney Trades Hall was unveiled in 1932.

Parliament of Australia
| Preceded by George Reid | Member for East Sydney; 1910–1931 | Succeeded by Eddie Ward |
