= Division of East Sydney =

Former Australian federal electoral division

Coordinates: 33.8500°S 151.2000°E

East Sydney Australian House of Representatives Division
- Created: 1901
- Abolished: 1969
- Namesake: East Sydney, New South Wales

The Division of East Sydney was an Australian electoral division in New South Wales. The division was created in 1900 and was one of the original 75 divisions contested at the first federal election. It was abolished in 1969. It was named for the suburb of East Sydney. It was located in the inner eastern suburbs of Sydney, including Darlinghurst, Paddington, Redfern, Surry Hills and Waverley. From 1901 to 1955 the division included Lord Howe Island. After 1910 East Sydney was usually a safe seat for the Australian Labor Party. In the 1930s it was a stronghold of Lang Labor. Its most prominent members were Sir George Reid, who was Prime Minister of Australia in 1904-05, and Eddie Ward, a long-serving Labor member and Cabinet minister.

== Members ==
Image	Member	Party	Term	Notes
	George Reid (1845–1918)	Free Trade	29 March 1901 – 18 August 1903	Previously held the New South Wales Legislative Assembly seat of Sydney-King. Served as Opposition Leader from 1901 to 1904, and from 1905 to 1908. Resigned in protest against an electoral boundaries bill. Subsequently re-elected. Served as Prime Minister from 1904 to 1905. Resigned to become the High Commissioner to the United Kingdom. Later elected to the British House of Commons seat of St George's, Hanover Square in 1916
	George Reid (1845–1918)	Free Trade	4 September 1903 – 1906	Previously held the New South Wales Legislative Assembly seat of Sydney-King. Served as Opposition Leader from 1901 to 1904, and from 1905 to 1908. Resigned in protest against an electoral boundaries bill. Subsequently re-elected. Served as Prime Minister from 1904 to 1905. Resigned to become the High Commissioner to the United Kingdom. Later elected to the British House of Commons seat of St George's, Hanover Square in 1916
	George Reid (1845–1918)	Anti-Socialist	1906 – 26 May 1909	Previously held the New South Wales Legislative Assembly seat of Sydney-King. Served as Opposition Leader from 1901 to 1904, and from 1905 to 1908. Resigned in protest against an electoral boundaries bill. Subsequently re-elected. Served as Prime Minister from 1904 to 1905. Resigned to become the High Commissioner to the United Kingdom. Later elected to the British House of Commons seat of St George's, Hanover Square in 1916
	George Reid (1845–1918)	Liberal	26 May 1909 – 24 December 1909	Previously held the New South Wales Legislative Assembly seat of Sydney-King. Served as Opposition Leader from 1901 to 1904, and from 1905 to 1908. Resigned in protest against an electoral boundaries bill. Subsequently re-elected. Served as Prime Minister from 1904 to 1905. Resigned to become the High Commissioner to the United Kingdom. Later elected to the British House of Commons seat of St George's, Hanover Square in 1916
	John West (1852–1931)	Labor	13 April 1910 – 5 February 1931	Died in office
	Eddie Ward (1899–1963)	Labor	7 March 1931 – 27 March 1931	Lost seat
	Eddie Ward (1899–1963)	Labor (NSW)	27 March 1931 – 19 December 1931	Lost seat
	John Clasby (1891–1932)	United Australia	19 December 1931 – 15 January 1932	Died in office
	Eddie Ward (1899–1963)	Labor (NSW)	6 February 1932 – February 1936	Served as minister under Curtin, Forde and Chifley. Died in office
	Eddie Ward (1899–1963)	Labor	February 1936 – 31 July 1963	Served as minister under Curtin, Forde and Chifley. Died in office
	Len Devine (1923–2008)	Labor	28 September 1963 – 29 September 1969	Retired after East Sydney was abolished in 1969
