= John Clasby =

Australian politician

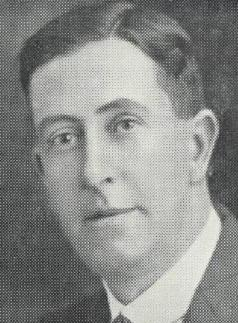

Member of the Australian Parliament for East Sydney
- In office 19 December 1931 – 15 January 1932
- Preceded by: Eddie Ward
- Succeeded by: Eddie Ward

Personal details
- Born: 1891 Warragul, Victoria
- Died: 15 January 1932 (aged 40)
- Party: United Australia Party
- Occupation: Lecturer

John Joseph Clasby (11 September 1891 – 15 January 1932) was an Australian politician.

Clasby was born in Warragul, Victoria. He was a Catholic of Irish ancestry. He served in World War I from 1914 with the Light Horse and later with the Artillery in Egypt and in France but returned to Australia in September 1917 after being wounded and gassed. He became a commercial traveller and lecturer on his return and also a prominent member of the Commercial Travellers' Club and vice-president of the Paddington-Woollahra branch of the Returned and Services League. In 1930, he had been a prominent opponent of the "no-license" campaign, which had attempted to prohibit alcohol sales in Victoria.

In 1931, he was elected to the Australian House of Representatives as the United Australia Party member for East Sydney, defeating the sitting MP, Eddie Ward of the Lang Labor party. Although the seat had historically been a comfortably safe Labor seat, vote-splitting between Ward and the official Labor candidate allowed Clasby to win when just over half of the official Labor candidate's preferences flowed to him. Having never fully recovered from his war injuries, Clasby's health suffered from the strenuous election campaign, and he died just a month later, at age 40, before he had taken his seat in the House. A by-election was held in February 1932, which Ward won. Clasby was buried at South Head Cemetery.

Parliament of Australia
Preceded by Eddie Ward	Member for East Sydney; 1931–1932	Succeeded by Eddie Ward
