= Eddie Ward =

Australian politician

The Honourable Eddie Ward
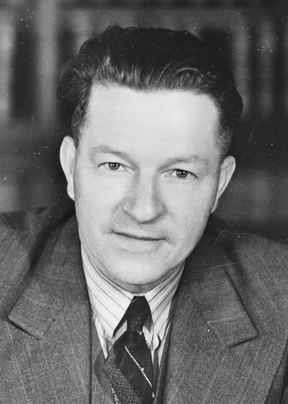

Minister for Transport
- In office 21 September 1943 – 19 December 1949
- Prime Minister: John Curtin; Frank Forde; Ben Chifley
- Preceded by: George Lawson
- Succeeded by: Howard Beale

Minister for External Territories
- In office 21 September 1943 – 19 December 1949
- Prime Minister: John Curtin; Frank Forde; Ben Chifley
- Preceded by: James Fraser
- Succeeded by: Percy Spender

Minister for Labour and National Service
- In office 7 October 1941 – 21 September 1943
- Prime Minister: John Curtin
- Preceded by: Harold Holt
- Succeeded by: Jack Holloway

Father of the House
- In office 9 December 1961 – 31 July 1963
- Preceded by: Earle Page
- Succeeded by: Joe Clark

Member of the Australian Parliament for East Sydney
- In office 6 February 1932 – 31 July 1963
- Preceded by: John Clasby
- Succeeded by: Len Devine
- In office 7 March 1931 – 19 December 1931
- Preceded by: John West
- Succeeded by: John Clasby

Personal details
- Born: 7 March 1899 Darlington, New South Wales, Australia
- Died: 31 July 1963 (aged 64) Darlinghurst, New South Wales, Australia
- Party: Labor
- Other political affiliations: Lang Labor (1931–36)
- Spouse: Edith Bishop (m. 1924)
- Occupation: Unionist

Edward John Ward (7 March 1899 – 31 July 1963) was an Australian politician who represented the Australian Labor Party (ALP) in federal parliament for over 30 years. He was the member for East Sydney for all but six and a half weeks from 1931 until his death in 1963. He served as a minister in the Curtin and Chifley governments from 1941 to 1949, and was also known for his role in the ALP split of 1931.

Ward was born in Sydney and left school at the age of 14; he became involved in the labour movement at a young age. He was elected to the Sydney Municipal Council in 1930, and the following year won Labor preselection for the 1931 East Sydney by-election. He was elected to the House of Representatives, but Prime Minister James Scullin refused him admission to the ALP caucus due to his support for Jack Lang. Ward and six other "Lang Labor" MPs formed a separate parliamentary party and eventually brought down Scullin's government. He lost his seat at the 1931 federal election. However, his successor John Clasby died only a month later and he re-entered parliament at the ensuing by-election, and held the seat until his death.

In 1941, Ward was elected to cabinet by the ALP caucus and appointed Minister for Labour and National Service by Prime Minister John Curtin. He had an uneasy relationship with Curtin, and his claims about the "Brisbane Line" led to a royal commission which found they were unsubstantiated. He received an effective demotion after the 1943 election, becoming Minister for Transport and External Territories. He held those offices until Labor lost power in 1949. Ward stood for the deputy leadership of the ALP on numerous occasions, and also mounted a challenge for the leadership against Herbert Evatt in 1959. He died in office in 1963, having been the longest-serving MP since 1961.

== Early life ==
Ward was born on 7 March 1899 in Darlington, Sydney. He was the fourth child and oldest son born to Mary Ann (née Maher) and Edward James Ward; his father worked for the Sydney tramways. His parents were Australian-born, while all of his grandparents were Irish Catholics except for his paternal grandfather who was an English-born Protestant.

Ward began his education at the St Francis de Sales convent school in Surry Hills, later attending the Cleveland Street Public School and the Crown Street Public School. He was largely self-educated and was an avid reader. He left school at the age of 14 and worked variously as a fruit-picker, printer's devil, tarpaulin-maker, and as a clerk at a hardware store. He eventually found work at the Eveleigh Railway Workshops, but was sacked for his involvement in the 1917 general strike. In the same year, Ward was conscripted into the Militia for "home service", a form of compulsory military training. He refused to participate in some of his required duties and was detained at a military disciplinary camp at Middle Head for a week.

In September 1917, Ward began working for Resch's Limited in Redfern labelling beer bottles. He left the brewery in December 1920 and moved to Lithgow to work as a clerk at Hoskins Iron and Steel. His duties included those of weighman, dispatch clerk and ledger-keeper. He was made redundant after eight months and returned to Sydney where he was unemployed for several months. He supplemented his income by boxing semi-professionally. In early 1923 he returned to Lithgow and resumed his work as a weighman, but by the end of the year he had decided to return to Sydney.

Ward successfully applied for reinstatement to New South Wales Government Railways in 1924, seven years after his termination. He was immediately assigned to the Sydney Tramways as a labourer in the overhead lines section of the Leichhardt Tram Depot. He was active in the Tramways Union and was involved with a rank-and-file movement to remove certain officeholders, which resulted in an investigation by the union's national executive and eventually court proceedings. Ward emerged as "a dominant force in the union" which brought him to the attention of prominent Labor figures such as Jack Lang, Jack Beasley, and Jock Garden. He was also friends with Bill McKell from a young age.

== Early political involvement ==
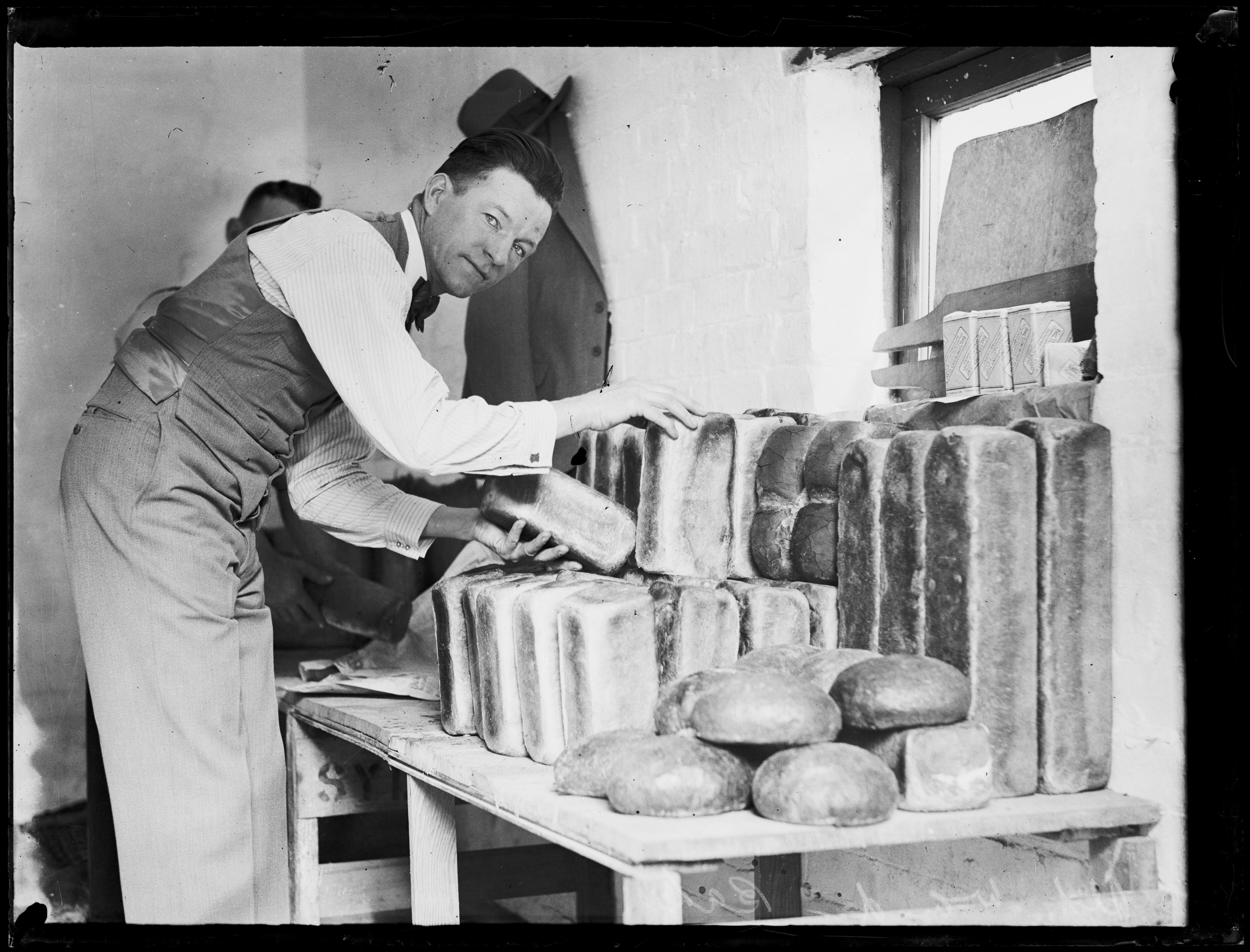
Ward in 1930 as a Sydney alderman, organising loaves of bread for distribution during the Great Depression

Ward joined the Labor Party in 1915 at the invitation of Mary Beddie, an elderly spinster and Labor activist who rented a room from Ward's parents. He and his friend Les Webster quickly came to dominate the party's Surry Hills branch and he was branch president and secretary by his early twenties. He remained loyal to the ALP during the 1916 party split over conscription and organised opposition to ALP prime minister Billy Hughes within his branch. In 1919 he received a head injury while protesting the deportation of labour leader Paul Freeman.

By the late 1920s Ward was secretary of the ALP electorate council for the federal seat of West Sydney, with Jack Beasley as president. Following the death in office of the incumbent ALP member William Lambert in 1928, Ward led the successful efforts to secure Beasley's preselection as Lambert's successor. He subsequently served as campaign director for Beasley at the 1928 federal election.

In 1930, Ward was elected to the Sydney City Council as the alderman for Flinders Ward. He served on the council's committees for works, electricity, and health. He was elected alongside Jock Garden and the two "became a powerful force in City Council affairs". During the Great Depression he was an advocate for the unemployed, establishing a relief committee and secured donations of fresh fruit and vegetables from the Sydney Markets. He also helped establish a co-operative bakery in Surry Hills to provide cheaper bread for the unemployed.

== Parliament ==
=== First years in parliament ===
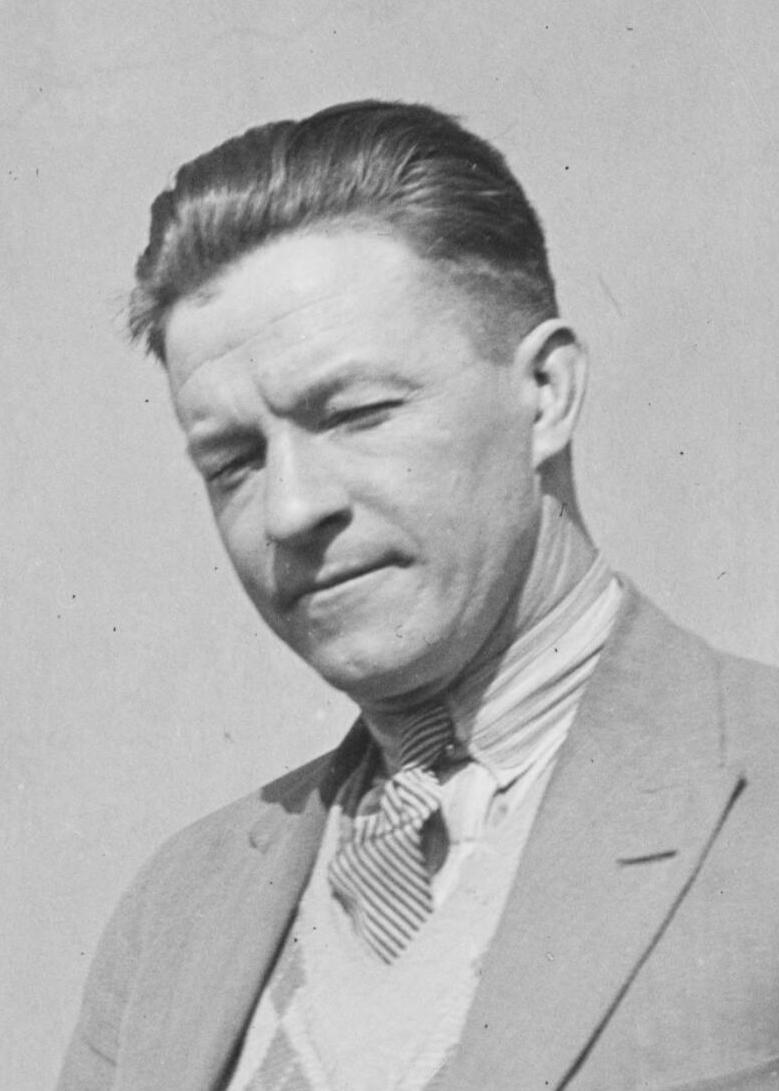
Ward c. 1931

Ward was first elected to the House of Representatives at the 1931 East Sydney by-election in the midst of the Great Depression and the rise to prominence of NSW's Labor Premier Jack Lang, whose policies for dealing with the depression were considered radically left wing. Ward was a Lang supporter and gained notoriety soon after his election when Prime Minister and ALP leader James Scullin refused to allow Ward into the ALP caucus. In response, Ward joined Jack Beasley and three other Lang supporters in forming the "Australian Labor Party (NSW)", popularly known as "Lang Labor". Eight months later, Ward and the other Lang Labor members voted with the opposition on a no-confidence motion to bring down the Scullin government.

Ward lost his seat later that year to the United Australia Party at the federal election. The Labor vote was split between Ward and official ALP candidate George Buckland. On the second count, just over half of Buckland's preferences flowed to UAP candidate John Clasby, allowing Clasby to win. As luck would have it, Clasby died less than a month after the election before he even took his seat in parliament. At the ensuing February 1932 by-election, Ward reclaimed the seat, again as a Lang Labor candidate.

Ward remained in Lang Labor until 1936, when he returned to the ALP. Nevertheless, he would continue to have a prickly relationship with many of his Labor colleagues for the rest of his life.

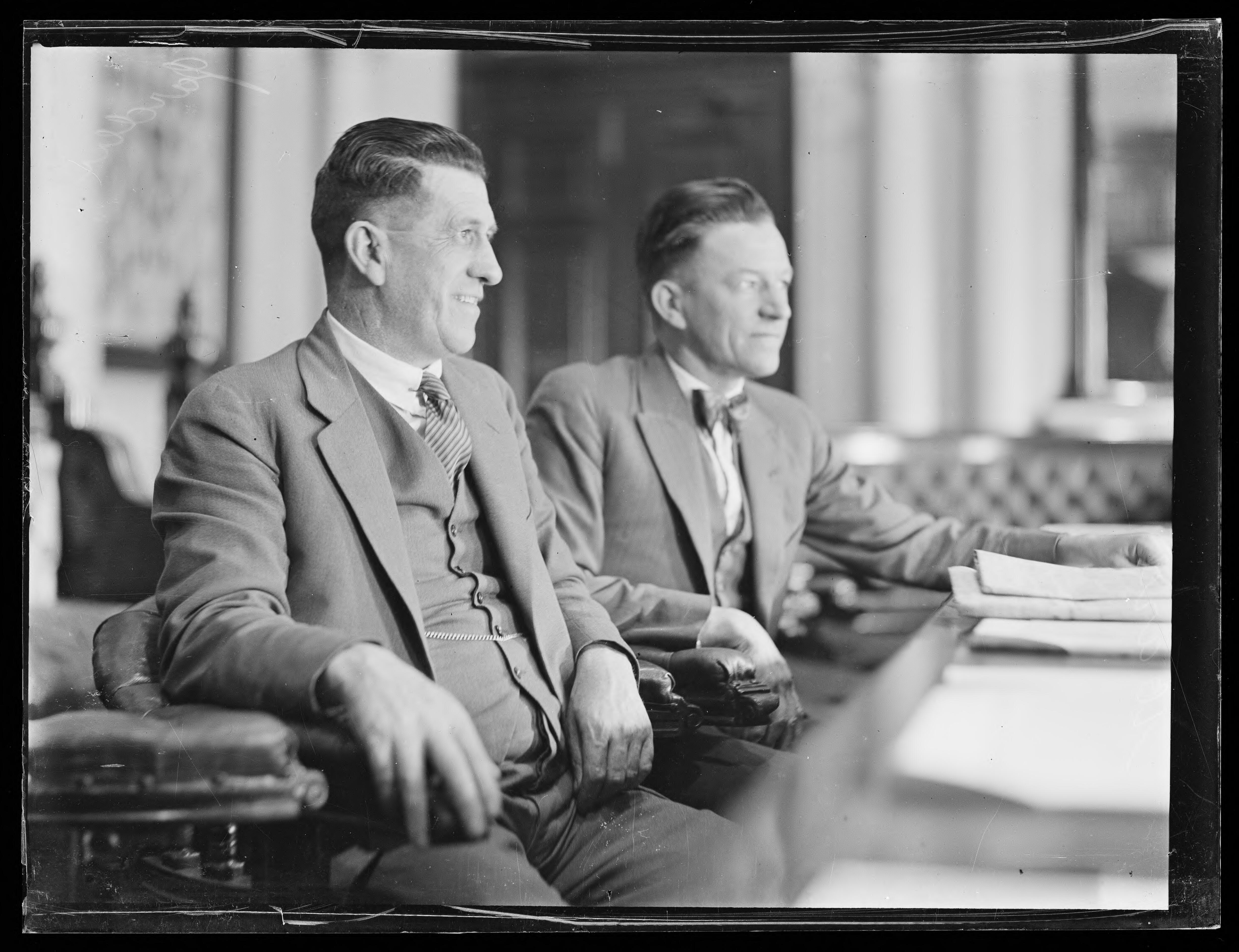
Ward with Jock Garden, c. 1935

One such issue that set Ward apart from his parliamentary colleagues was his opposition to any form of defence spending. During the 1936 budget debate, he argued that any funding earmarked for defence would be better spent on welfare and unemployment relief. In reference to a move to increase the size of the Royal Australian Navy, Ward said:

I wonder if such vessels are really needed for the defence of Australia, or whether they are not required for the purpose of helping other peoples defend rich possessions in other parts of the world.

=== Government minister (1941–1949) ===
In 1941, Ward entered the ministry of new Prime Minister John Curtin. Ward served as Minister for Labour and National Service before being moved to Minister for Transport and Minister for External Territories in 1943, considered a demotion – Curtin pointed out that "the Japs [Japanese] have got the External Territories and the Army's got the transport", leaving Ward with little to administer. Even before then, however, Ward barely concealed his hostility to Curtin; for instance, he once accused Curtin of "putting young men into the slaughterhouse, although thirty years ago you would not go into it yourself".

In early 1945, Ward was secretly offered the post of Australian minister to the Soviet Union by Norman Makin, acting on Curtin's behalf as an apparent attempt to secure Ward's removal from the ministry. Ward declined to accept the position and in later years recounted that "Curtin tried to send me to Siberia, but I wouldn't go".

Following the death of Curtin in 1945, Ward nominated for leadership of the Labor Party, which would have resulted in him becoming prime minister, but lost to Ben Chifley. Ward would continue to harbour leadership aspirations throughout the rest of his career. Rarely, if ever, did he have a friendly working relationship with any ALP leader.

After World War II, Ward remained in the spotlight. He vigorously opposed the Bretton Woods system and Australia joining the International Monetary Fund and the International Bank for Reconstruction (later one of five institutions in the World Bank Group), because he believed international financiers were responsible for the Depression in Australia during the 1930s. Ward argued that signing Bretton Woods would "enthrone a World Dictatorship of private finance, more complete and terrible than any Hitlerite dream"; destroy Australian democracy; pervert and paganise Christian ideals; and endanger world peace. It was outbursts like these that would continue to stymie his leadership ambitions within the Labor Party.

He was famous for sardonically "welcoming" Menzies back to Australia after his many three-month absences in England at the beginning of each parliamentary year. Ward was the subject of a parliamentary outburst by Menzies (who had apparently drunk too much) during a discussion of the Communist Party Dissolution Bill. Ward often criticised Menzies and in 1944, had called him "a posturing individual with the scowl of a Mussolini, the bombast of a Hitler and the physical proportions of a Göring".

His highest contempt, however, was for those who he considered had betrayed the working class. He refused an invitation to a function celebrating Labor-turned-Nationalist Prime Minister Billy Hughes' 50 years in parliament, saying "I don't eat cheese", a reference to Hughes' nickname of "Billy the Rat".

=== Opposition and final years (1949–1963) ===
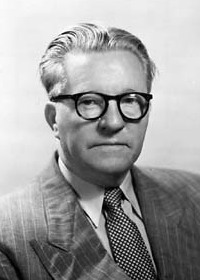
Ward in 1956

Following the 1946 election, Ward nominated for Deputy Leader of the Labor Party but was beaten by Herbert Evatt. Setting a trend, he was again nominated for deputy leader in 1951, coming third behind Arthur Calwell and the comparatively little-known Percy Clarey; and in 1960, when he lost narrowly to future Prime Minister Gough Whitlam, despite getting the support of newly elected leader Arthur Calwell who disliked Whitlam. In 1961, upon the defeat of Earle Page, Ward became the Father of the Australian House of Representatives. However, with the end of his leadership aspirations and the onset of advanced atherosclerosis, diabetes mellitus and heart disease, Ward was losing political importance although he was still seen as an elder statesman of the Labor Party. The ALP had narrowly lost the 1961 election under the leadership of Arthur Calwell. Calwell would later write in his autobiography that he believed that the party could have won the 1961 election if Ward had been his deputy instead of Whitlam. He was still serving as Member for East Sydney when he died of a heart attack at St Vincent's Hospital, Darlinghurst. Asked when he knew that his health was failing, he said it was when he "took a swing at Gough Whitlam, and missed". He was given a state funeral and buried with Catholic rites in Randwick Cemetery.

Arthur Calwell eulogised Ward as an irrepressible fighter and unrelenting hater whilst Curtin had dismissed him as a "bloody ratbag". The journalist Arthur Hoyle believed that many of Ward's generation believed that he was "most authentic voice that the working class in Australia has had".

== Personal life ==
In 1924, Ward married Edith Bishop, after several years of courtship. They had one son and one daughter together.

Ward was a devout Catholic who "regularly read the Bible". Despite his fiery reputation, he had a reputation for refusing to use profanity and once succeeded in overturning a charge of using indecent language by calling several witnesses to testify that he did not swear. He was also a teetotaller and did not smoke.

== Notes ==
Political offices
Preceded by Harold Holt	Minister for Labour and National Service; 1941–1943	Succeeded by Jack Holloway
Preceded by George Lawson	Minister for Transport; 1943–1949	Succeeded by Howard Beale
Preceded by James Fraser	Minister for External Territories; 1943–1949	Succeeded by Percy Spender
Parliament of Australia
Preceded by John West	Member for East Sydney; 1931	Succeeded by John Clasby
Preceded by John Clasby	Member for East Sydney; 1932–1963	Succeeded by Len Devine
Preceded by Earle Page	Father of the House of Representatives; 1961–1963	Succeeded by Robert Menzies/Joseph Clark/ Sir John McEwen
