= Electoral results for the Division of Denison =

Australian division election results

This is a list of electoral results for the Division of Denison in Australian federal elections from the division's creation in 1903 until it was abolished in 2019 and replaced with Clark.

== Members ==
Member	Party	Term
Sir Philip Fysh	Protectionist	1903–1906
Sir Philip Fysh	Anti-Socialist	1906–1909
Sir Philip Fysh	Liberal	1909–1910
William Laird Smith	Labor	1910–1916
William Laird Smith	National Labor	1916–1917
William Laird Smith	Nationalist	1917–1922
David O'Keefe	Labor	1922–1925
Sir John Gellibrand	Nationalist	1925–1928
Charles Culley	Labor	1928–1931
Arthur Hutchin	United Australia	1931–1934
Gerald Mahoney	Labor	1934–1940
Arthur Beck	United Australia	1940–1943
Frank Gaha	Labor	1943–1949
Athol Townley	Liberal	1949–1964
Adrian Gibson	Liberal	1964 by–1969
Robert Solomon	Liberal	1969–1972
John Coates	Labor	1972–1975
Michael Hodgman	Liberal	1975–1987
Duncan Kerr	Labor	1987–2010
Andrew Wilkie	Independent	2010–2019

== Election results ==
=== Elections in the 2010s ===
==== 2016 ====
2016 Australian federal election: Denison
Party	Candidate	Votes	%	±%
Independent	Andrew Wilkie	29,372	44.07	+5.99
Labor	Jane Austin	15,335	23.01	−1.74
Liberal	Marcus Allan	13,267	19.90	−3.33
Greens	Jen Brown	7,068	10.60	+2.68
Christian Democrats	Amanda Excell	980	1.47	+1.47
Democratic Labour	Wayne Williams	632	0.95	+0.10
Total formal votes		66,654	97.08	+1.30
Informal votes		2,002	2.92	−1.30
Turnout		68,656	92.82	−1.44
Notional two-party-preferred count
Labor	Jane Austin	43,550	65.34	+6.43
Liberal	Marcus Allan	23,104	34.66	−6.43
Two-candidate-preferred result
Independent	Andrew Wilkie	45,176	67.78	+2.27
Labor	Jane Austin	21,478	32.22	−2.27
Independent hold		Swing	+2.27	

==== 2013 ====
2013 Australian federal election: Denison
Party	Candidate	Votes	%	±%
Independent	Andrew Wilkie	24,688	38.08	+16.82
Labor	Jane Austin	16,043	24.75	−11.04
Liberal	Tanya Denison	15,058	23.23	+0.58
Greens	Anna Reynolds	5,133	7.92	−11.06
Palmer United	Debra Thurley	1,576	2.43	+2.43
Sex Party	Bob Butler	877	1.35	+1.35
Family First	Trevlyn McCallum	593	0.91	+0.91
Democratic Labour	Wayne Williams	554	0.85	+0.85
Rise Up Australia	Graeme Devlin	179	0.28	+0.28
Stable Population	Brandon Hoult	124	0.19	+0.19
Total formal votes		64,825	95.78	−0.60
Informal votes		2,856	4.22	+0.60
Turnout		67,681	94.31	−0.01
Notional two-party-preferred count
Labor	Jane Austin	38,186	58.91	−6.91
Liberal	Tanya Denison	26,639	41.09	+6.91
Two-candidate-preferred result
Independent	Andrew Wilkie	42,470	65.51	+14.30
Labor	Jane Austin	22,355	34.49	−14.30
Independent hold		Swing	+14.30	

==== 2010 ====
2010 Australian federal election: Denison
Party	Candidate	Votes	%	±%
Labor	Jonathan Jackson	23,215	35.79	−12.37
Liberal	Cameron Simpkins	14,688	22.65	−7.34
Independent	Andrew Wilkie	13,788	21.26	+21.26
Greens	Geoffrey Couser	12,312	18.98	+0.40
Socialist Alliance	Mel Barnes	856	1.32	+0.56
Total formal votes		64,859	96.38	−1.12
Informal votes		2,435	3.62	+1.12
Turnout		67,294	94.32	−1.21
Notional two-party-preferred count
Labor	Jonathan Jackson	42,692	65.82	+0.53
Liberal	Cameron Simpkins	22,167	34.18	−0.53
Two-candidate-preferred result
Independent	Andrew Wilkie	33,217	51.21	+51.21
Labor	Jonathan Jackson	31,642	48.79	−16.50
Independent gain from Labor		Swing	+51.21	

=== Elections in the 2000s ===
==== 2007 ====
2007 Australian federal election: Denison
Party	Candidate	Votes	%	±%
Labor	Duncan Kerr	31,001	48.46	−1.05
Liberal	Leigh Gray	18,974	29.66	−2.90
Greens	Helen Hutchinson	11,898	18.60	+4.00
Family First	Robyn Munro	1,360	2.13	−0.34
Socialist Alliance	Susan Austin	494	0.77	−0.08
Citizens Electoral Council	Rob Larner	243	0.38	+0.38
Total formal votes		63,970	97.50	+0.61
Informal votes		1,640	2.50	−0.61
Turnout		65,610	95.25	−0.02
Two-party-preferred result
Labor	Duncan Kerr	41,982	65.63	+2.34
Liberal	Leigh Gray	21,988	34.37	−2.34
Labor hold		Swing	+2.34	

==== 2004 ====
2004 Australian federal election: Denison
Party	Candidate	Votes	%	±%
Labor	Duncan Kerr	31,602	49.51	−1.87
Liberal	Erick Pastoor	20,782	32.56	+0.97
Greens	Helen Burnet	9,318	14.60	+4.15
Family First	Gino Papiccio	1,578	2.47	+2.47
Socialist Alliance	Kamala Emanuel	544	0.85	+0.85
Total formal votes		63,824	96.90	−0.19
Informal votes		2,045	3.10	+0.19
Turnout		65,869	95.26	−0.36
Two-party-preferred result
Labor	Duncan Kerr	40,397	63.29	−0.97
Liberal	Erick Pastoor	23,427	36.71	+0.97
Labor hold		Swing	−0.97	

==== 2001 ====
2001 Australian federal election: Denison
Party	Candidate	Votes	%	±%
Labor	Duncan Kerr	32,404	51.38	−4.28
Liberal	Tony Steven	19,923	31.59	−0.53
Greens	Brenda Hampson	6,592	10.45	+2.95
Democrats	Penny Edwards	4,154	6.59	+2.66
Total formal votes		63,073	97.09	−0.38
Informal votes		1,889	2.91	+0.38
Turnout		64,962	96.56	
Two-party-preferred result
Labor	Duncan Kerr	40,530	64.26	−0.25
Liberal	Tony Steven	22,543	35.74	+0.25
Labor hold		Swing	−0.25	

=== Elections in the 1990s ===
==== 1998 ====
1998 Australian federal election: Denison
Party	Candidate	Votes	%	±%
Labor	Duncan Kerr	34,854	55.66	+3.38
Liberal	Andrew Gregson	20,114	32.12	−2.18
Greens	Mat Hines	4,698	7.50	−0.78
Democrats	Brent Blackburn	2,460	3.93	−0.45
Natural Law	Gregory Broszczyk	497	0.79	+0.79
Total formal votes		62,623	97.47	−0.38
Informal votes		1,624	2.53	+0.38
Turnout		64,247	95.38	−0.84
Two-party-preferred result
Labor	Duncan Kerr	40,399	64.51	+2.72
Liberal	Andrew Gregson	22,224	35.49	−2.72
Labor hold		Swing	+2.72	

==== 1996 ====
1996 Australian federal election: Denison
Party	Candidate	Votes	%	±%
Labor	Duncan Kerr	33,023	52.27	+1.01
Liberal	Ingrid Wren	21,667	34.30	+2.94
Greens	Karen Weldrick	5,229	8.28	−5.94
Democrats	Rachel Dudgeon	2,769	4.38	+3.20
	Sarah Stephen	486	0.77	+0.77
Total formal votes		63,174	97.86	+0.47
Informal votes		1,384	2.14	−0.47
Turnout		64,558	96.22	+0.47
Two-party-preferred result
Labor	Duncan Kerr	38,941	61.79	−2.65
Liberal	Ingrid Wren	24,078	38.21	+2.65
Labor hold		Swing	−2.65	

==== 1993 ====
1993 Australian federal election: Denison
Party	Candidate	Votes	%	±%
Labor	Duncan Kerr	32,793	51.27	+6.70
Liberal	Phil Ryan	20,056	31.35	−9.24
Greens	Bob Brown	9,093	14.22	+7.86
Call to Australia	Euan Vance	871	1.36	+1.36
Democrats	Kevin Anderson	759	1.19	−5.61
	Teresa Dowding	393	0.61	+0.61
Total formal votes		63,965	97.39	−0.18
Informal votes		1,717	2.61	+0.18
Turnout		65,682	95.75	
Two-party-preferred result
Labor	Duncan Kerr	41,195	64.44	+8.45
Liberal	Phil Ryan	22,733	35.56	−8.45
Labor hold		Swing	+8.45	

==== 1990 ====
1990 Australian federal election: Denison
Party	Candidate	Votes	%	±%
Labor	Duncan Kerr	25,811	45.0	−3.3
Liberal	Michael Hodgman	23,056	40.2	−4.2
United Tasmania	Geoff Law	3,888	6.8	+6.8
Democrats	Rob Alliston	3,554	6.2	−1.1
Independent	Graeme Jones	701	1.2	+1.2
Democratic Socialist	Ian Hopkins	327	0.6	+0.6
Total formal votes		57,337	97.6	
Informal votes		1,438	2.4	
Turnout		58,775	96.3	
Two-party-preferred result
Labor	Duncan Kerr	32,333	56.4	+2.6
Liberal	Michael Hodgman	24,956	43.6	−2.6
Labor hold		Swing	+2.6	

=== Elections in the 1980s ===
==== 1987 ====
1987 Australian federal election: Denison
Party	Candidate	Votes	%	±%
Labor	Duncan Kerr	26,732	48.3	+3.4
Liberal	Michael Hodgman	24,590	44.4	−3.7
Democrats	Robert Bell	4,054	7.3	+7.3
Total formal votes		55,376	95.6	
Informal votes		2,540	4.4	
Turnout		57,916	95.2	
Two-party-preferred result
Labor	Duncan Kerr	29,787	53.8	+4.8
Liberal	Michael Hodgman	25,587	46.2	−4.8
Labor gain from Liberal		Swing	+4.8	

==== 1984 ====
1984 Australian federal election: Denison
Party	Candidate	Votes	%	±%
Liberal	Michael Hodgman	25,929	48.1	−4.4
Labor	Kay Spurr	24,230	44.9	+1.5
Independent	Mary Willey	3,747	7.0	+7.0
Total formal votes		53,906	94.1	
Informal votes		3,400	5.9	
Turnout		57,306	95.1	
Two-party-preferred result
Liberal	Michael Hodgman	27,466	51.0	−2.9
Labor	Kay Spurr	26,437	49.0	+2.9
Liberal hold		Swing	−2.9	

==== 1983 ====
1983 Australian federal election: Denison
Party	Candidate	Votes	%	±%
Liberal	Michael Hodgman	28,468	54.4	+4.2
Labor	Kathy Smith	21,680	41.5	−4.4
Democrats	Harvey Wallace-Williams	1,743	3.3	−0.6
Socialist Workers	Leica Wagner	406	0.8	+0.8
Total formal votes		52,297	97.8	
Informal votes		1,199	2.2	
Turnout		53,496	96.0	
Two-party-preferred result
Liberal	Michael Hodgman		55.8	+3.4
Labor	Kathy Smith		44.2	−3.4
Liberal hold		Swing	+3.4	

==== 1980 ====
1980 Australian federal election: Denison
Party	Candidate	Votes	%	±%
Liberal	Michael Hodgman	25,751	50.2	−0.7
Labor	Ken Wriedt	23,538	45.9	+1.2
Democrats	Peter Creet	1,998	3.9	−0.5
Total formal votes		51,287	97.5	
Informal votes		1,340	2.5	
Turnout		52,627	96.6	
Two-party-preferred result
Liberal	Michael Hodgman		52.4	−0.7
Labor	Ken Wriedt		47.6	+0.7
Liberal hold		Swing	−0.7	

=== Elections in the 1970s ===
==== 1977 ====
1977 Australian federal election: Denison
Party	Candidate	Votes	%	±%
Liberal	Michael Hodgman	26,418	50.9	−2.3
Labor	John Coates	23,184	44.7	−0.1
Democrats	Robert McFie	2,303	4.4	+4.4
Total formal votes		51,905	98.0	
Informal votes		1,047	2.0	
Turnout		52,952	96.4	
Two-party-preferred result
Liberal	Michael Hodgman		53.1	−1.7
Labor	John Coates		46.9	+1.7
Liberal hold		Swing	−1.7	

==== 1975 ====
1975 Australian federal election: Denison
Party	Candidate	Votes	%	±%
Liberal	Michael Hodgman	26,253	53.2	+6.0
Labor	John Coates	22,104	44.8	−8.0
National Country	John Charles Hay	496	1.0	+1.0
Workers	Cathryn Marie Stanton	473	1.0	+1.0
Total formal votes		49,326	98.4	
Informal votes		808	1.6	
Turnout		50,134	95.7	
Two-party-preferred result
Liberal	Michael Hodgman		54.9	+7.7
Labor	John Coates		45.1	−7.7
Liberal gain from Labor		Swing	+7.7	

==== 1974 ====
1974 Australian federal election: Denison
Party	Candidate	Votes	%	±%
Labor	John Coates	25,626	52.8	+3.3
Liberal	Michael Hodgman	22,928	47.2	+7.5
Total formal votes		48,554	98.4	
Informal votes		773	1.6	
Turnout		49,327	95.8	
Labor hold		Swing	−1.8	

==== 1972 ====
1972 Australian federal election: Denison
Party	Candidate	Votes	%	±%
Labor	John Coates	21,286	49.5	+11.9
Liberal	Robert Solomon	17,074	39.7	+11.2
Independent	Brian Broadby	1,915	4.5	+4.5
Democratic Labor	Michael Delaney	1,630	3.8	−1.8
Australia	Bill Scetrine	1,076	2.5	+2.5
Total formal votes		42,981	98.0	
Informal votes		873	2.0	
Turnout		43,854	97.2	
Two-party-preferred result
Labor	John Coates		54.6	+7.2
Liberal	Robert Solomon		45.4	−7.2
Labor gain from Liberal		Swing	+7.2	

=== Elections in the 1960s ===
==== 1969 ====
1969 Australian federal election: Denison
Party	Candidate	Votes	%	±%
Labor	Alasdair McBurnie	15,588	37.6	−9.7
Liberal	Robert Solomon	11,800	28.5	−17.4
Independent	Michael Townley	10,954	26.4	+26.4
Democratic Labor	Michael Delaney	2,303	5.6	−0.4
Independent	Bill Mollison	791	1.9	+1.9
Total formal votes		41,436	97.3	
Informal votes		1,129	2.7	
Turnout		42,565	95.8	
Two-party-preferred result
Liberal	Robert Solomon	21,775	52.6	−1.9
Labor	Alasdair McBurnie	19,661	47.4	+1.9
Liberal hold		Swing	−1.9	

==== 1966 ====
1966 Australian federal election: Denison
Party	Candidate	Votes	%	±%
Liberal	Adrian Gibson	15,516	47.8	−3.5
Labor	Neil Batt	14,743	45.4	+6.2
Democratic Labor	Harold Grace	1,942	6.0	−0.4
Communist	Max Bound	289	0.9	−0.6
Total formal votes		32,490	98.1	
Informal votes		622	1.9	
Turnout		33,112	94.6	
Two-party-preferred result
Liberal	Adrian Gibson	17,082	52.6	−4.8
Labor	Neil Batt	15,408	47.4	+4.8
Liberal hold		Swing	−4.8	

==== 1964 by-election ====
Denison by-election, 1964
Party	Candidate	Votes	%	±%
Liberal	Adrian Gibson	16,953	51.1	−0.2
Labor	Donald Finlay	14,367	43.3	+4.1
Democratic Labor	Harold Senior	1,563	4.7	−1.7
Independent	Bernard Symmons	277	0.8	+0.8
Total formal votes		33,160	98.5	
Informal votes		491	1.5	
Turnout		33,651	91.4	
Two-party-preferred result
Liberal	Adrian Gibson		55.3	−2.1
Labor	Donald Finlay		44.7	+2.1
Liberal hold		Swing	−2.1	

==== 1963 ====
1963 Australian federal election: Denison
Party	Candidate	Votes	%	±%
Liberal	Athol Townley	17,372	51.3	−0.2
Labor	Donald Finlay	13,286	39.2	−1.8
Democratic Labor	Brian Bresnehan	2,159	6.4	−1.0
Independent	Bruce Brown	558	1.6	+1.6
Communist	Max Bound	506	1.5	+1.5
Total formal votes		33,881	98.0	
Informal votes		704	2.0	
Turnout		34,585	94.8	
Two-party-preferred result
Liberal	Athol Townley		57.4	+0.0
Labor	Donald Finlay		42.6	-0.0
Liberal hold		Swing	+0.0	

==== 1961 ====
1961 Australian federal election: Denison
Party	Candidate	Votes	%	±%
Liberal	Athol Townley	17,260	51.5	−1.1
Labor	Eric Howroyd	13,749	41.0	+5.6
Democratic Labor	Harold Senior	2,491	7.4	−0.8
Total formal votes		33,500	96.6	
Informal votes		1,197	3.4	
Turnout		34,697	94.8	
Two-party-preferred result
Liberal	Athol Townley		57.4	−2.0
Labor	Eric Howroyd		42.6	+2.0
Liberal hold		Swing	−2.0	

=== Elections in the 1950s ===
==== 1958 ====
1958 Australian federal election: Denison
Party	Candidate	Votes	%	±%
Liberal	Athol Townley	17,705	52.6	−4.9
Labor	Bert Lacey	11,926	35.4	−1.4
Democratic Labor	Harold Senior	2,775	8.2	+8.2
Communist	Max Bound	1,249	3.7	−2.0
Total formal votes		33,655	95.1	
Informal votes		1,744	4.9	
Turnout		35,399	95.2	
Two-party-preferred result
Liberal	Athol Townley		59.4	+1.3
Labor	Bert Lacey		40.6	−1.3
Liberal hold		Swing	+1.3	

==== 1955 ====
1955 Australian federal election: Denison
Party	Candidate	Votes	%	±%
Liberal	Athol Townley	20,058	57.5	+4.7
Labor	Brian Miller	12,828	36.8	−8.6
Communist	Max Bound	2,003	5.7	+3.8
Total formal votes		34,889	95.1	
Informal votes		1,807	4.9	
Turnout		36,696	95.3	
Two-party-preferred result
Liberal	Athol Townley		58.1	+5.3
Labor	Brian Miller		41.9	−5.3
Liberal hold		Swing	+5.3	

==== 1954 ====
1954 Australian federal election: Denison
Party	Candidate	Votes	%	±%
Liberal	Athol Townley	14,444	52.6	−0.7
Labor	Bert Lacey	12,322	44.9	−1.8
Communist	Max Bound	688	2.5	+2.5
Total formal votes		27,454	98.5	
Informal votes		430	1.5	
Turnout		27,884	95.8	
Two-party-preferred result
Liberal	Athol Townley		52.8	−0.5
Labor	Bert Lacey		47.2	+0.5
Liberal hold		Swing	−0.5	

==== 1951 ====
1951 Australian federal election: Denison
Party	Candidate	Votes	%	±%
Liberal	Athol Townley	15,449	53.3	−1.8
Labor	Mervyn McNeair	13,545	46.7	+1.8
Total formal votes		28,994	96.7	
Informal votes		1,001	3.3	
Turnout		29,995	96.1	
Liberal hold		Swing	−1.8	

=== Elections in the 1940s ===
==== 1949 ====
1949 Australian federal election: Denison
Party	Candidate	Votes	%	±%
Liberal	Athol Townley	16,431	55.1	+10.9
Labor	Henry Cosgrove	13,394	44.9	−10.9
Total formal votes		29,825	98.0	
Informal votes		614	2.0	
Turnout		30,439	94.3	
Liberal gain from Labor		Swing	+10.9	

==== 1946 ====
1946 Australian federal election: Denison
Party	Candidate	Votes	%	±%
Labor	Frank Gaha	16,231	57.0	+9.7
Liberal	Bruce Hamilton	12,227	43.0	+4.3
Total formal votes		28,458	97.0	
Informal votes		874	3.0	
Turnout		29,332	93.4	
Labor hold		Swing	−2.0	

==== 1943 ====
1943 Australian federal election: Denison
Party	Candidate	Votes	%	±%
Labor	Frank Gaha	13,208	47.3	−1.6
United Australia	Arthur Beck	10,803	38.7	−12.4
Independent Labor	Gerald Mahoney	3,120	11.2	+11.2
Communist	George Walliss	773	2.8	+2.8
Total formal votes		27,904	96.2	
Informal votes		1,094	3.8	
Turnout		28,998	98.4	
Two-party-preferred result
Labor	Frank Gaha	16,493	59.0	+10.1
United Australia	Arthur Beck	11,411	40.9	−10.1
Labor gain from United Australia		Swing	+10.1	

==== 1940 ====
1940 Australian federal election: Denison
Party	Candidate	Votes	%	±%
United Australia	Arthur Beck	12,969	51.1	+9.8
Labor	Gerald Mahoney	12,433	48.9	+1.4
Total formal votes		25,402	96.7	
Informal votes		880	3.3	
Turnout		26,282	93.0	
United Australia gain from Labor		Swing	+5.0	

=== Elections in the 1930s ===
==== 1937 ====
1937 Australian federal election: Denison
Party	Candidate	Votes	%	±%
Labor	Gerald Mahoney	11,652	47.5	−1.7
United Australia	John McPhee	10,123	41.3	−0.7
Independent Labor	Maxwell Hickman	2,159	8.8	+8.8
Social Credit	Athol Smith	600	2.4	−6.3
Total formal votes		24,534	96.8	
Informal votes		1,067	4.2	
Turnout		25,601	96.3	
Two-party-preferred result
Labor	Gerald Mahoney	13,218	53.9	+3.6
United Australia	John McPhee	11,316	46.1	−3.6
Labor hold		Swing	+3.6	

==== 1934 ====
1934 Australian federal election: Denison
Party	Candidate	Votes	%	±%
United Australia	Arthur Hutchin	9,721	42.0	−13.0
Labor	Gerald Mahoney	4,461	19.3	+4.2
Labor	Walter Woods	3,154	13.6	+13.6
Labor	Richard Darcey	2,555	11.0	+11.0
Social Credit	James Guthrie	2,020	8.7	+8.7
Labor	John Lattin	1,216	5.3	+5.3
Total formal votes		23,127	94.2	
Informal votes		1,424	5.8	
Turnout		24,551	96.4	
Two-party-preferred result
Labor	Gerald Mahoney	11,622	50.3	+5.3
United Australia	Arthur Hutchin	11,505	49.7	−5.3
Labor gain from United Australia		Swing	+5.3	

==== 1931 ====
1931 Australian federal election: Denison
Party	Candidate	Votes	%	±%
United Australia	Arthur Hutchin	12,078	55.0	+13.3
Labor	Charles Culley	9,868	45.0	−12.5
Total formal votes		21,946	95.0	
Informal votes		1,166	5.0	
Turnout		23,112	96.7	
United Australia gain from Labor		Swing	+14.2	

=== Elections in the 1920s ===
==== 1929 ====
1929 Australian federal election: Denison
Party	Candidate	Votes	%	±%
Labor	Charles Culley	12,451	57.5	+5.1
Nationalist	Sir John Gellibrand	5,663	26.2	−5.9
Nationalist	Horace Walch	2,082	9.6	+9.6
Nationalist	Hubert Brettingham-Moore	681	3.1	+3.1
Nationalist	John Gage	605	2.8	+2.8
Independent	David Blanchard	161	0.7	+0.7
Total formal votes		21,643	97.2	
Informal votes		623	2.8	
Turnout		22,266	95.9	
Two-party-preferred result
Labor	Charles Culley		59.2	+8.9
Nationalist	Sir John Gellibrand		40.8	−8.9
Labor hold		Swing	+8.9	

==== 1928 ====
1928 Australian federal election: Denison
Party	Candidate	Votes	%	±%
Nationalist	Sir John Gellibrand	9,486	47.6	−4.6
Labor	Charles Culley	7,824	39.3	+4.6
Labor	Thomas Jude	2,618	13.1	+13.1
Total formal votes		19,928	94.4	
Informal votes		1,171	5.6	
Turnout		21,099	92.5	
Two-party-preferred result
Labor	Charles Culley	10,028	50.3	+2.5
Nationalist	Sir John Gellibrand	9,900	49.7	−2.5
Labor gain from Nationalist		Swing	+2.5	

==== 1925 ====
1925 Australian federal election: Denison
Party	Candidate	Votes	%	±%
Nationalist	Sir John Gellibrand	10,782	52.2	+0.2
Labor	David O'Keefe	9,882	47.8	+1.3
Total formal votes		20,664	97.9	
Informal votes		450	2.1	
Turnout		21,114	88.5	
Nationalist gain from Labor		Swing	+2.6	

==== 1922 ====
1922 Australian federal election: Denison
Party	Candidate	Votes	%	±%
Labor	David O'Keefe	5,234	46.5	+0.4
Nationalist	Edward Mulcahy	2,295	20.4	−1.9
Nationalist	William Laird Smith	1,881	16.7	+16.7
Nationalist	Leopold Broinowski	1,667	14.8	+14.8
Independent	David Blanchard	170	1.5	+1.5
Total formal votes		11,247	90.7	
Informal votes		1,158	9.3	
Turnout		12,405	51.5	
Two-party-preferred result
Labor	David O'Keefe	5,669	50.4	+4.3
Nationalist	Edward Mulcahy	5,578	49.6	−4.3
Labor gain from Nationalist		Swing	+4.3	

=== Elections in the 1910s ===
==== 1919 ====
1919 Australian federal election: Denison
Party	Candidate	Votes	%	±%
Nationalist	William Laird Smith	9,505	53.9	−2.4
Labor	King O'Malley	8,141	46.1	+2.4
Total formal votes		17,646	98.3	
Informal votes		298	1.7	
Turnout		17,944	66.6	
Nationalist hold		Swing	−2.4	

==== 1917 ====
1917 Australian federal election: Denison
Party	Candidate	Votes	%	±%
Nationalist	William Laird Smith	10,964	56.3	+12.2
Labor	Benjamin Watkins	8,507	43.7	−12.2
Total formal votes		19,471	97.1	
Informal votes		576	2.9	
Turnout		20,047	79.1	
Nationalist gain from Labor		Swing	+12.2	

==== 1914 ====
1914 Australian federal election: Denison
Party	Candidate	Votes	%	±%
Labor	William Laird Smith	9,752	55.9	+3.4
Liberal	Arthur Clerke	7,701	44.1	−1.9
Total formal votes		17,453	97.0	
Informal votes		535	3.0	
Turnout		17,988	77.5	
Labor hold		Swing	+2.6	

==== 1913 ====
1913 Australian federal election: Denison
Party	Candidate	Votes	%	±%
Labor	William Laird Smith	8,943	52.5	−5.6
Liberal	William Trenwith	7,839	46.0	+4.1
Independent	Alicia O'Shea Petersen	261	1.5	+1.5
Total formal votes		17,043	96.3	
Informal votes		653	3.7	
Turnout		17,696	76.6	
Labor hold		Swing	−4.8	

==== 1910 ====
1910 Australian federal election: Denison
Party	Candidate	Votes	%	±%
Labour	William Laird Smith	7,170	58.1	+20.5
Liberal	Matthew Simmons	5,172	41.9	−20.5
Total formal votes		12,342	97.2	
Informal votes		359	2.8	
Turnout		12,701	64.6	
Labour gain from Liberal		Swing	+18.6	

=== Elections in the 1900s ===
==== 1906 ====
1906 Australian federal election: Denison
Party	Candidate	Votes	%	±%
Anti-Socialist	Sir Philip Fysh	6,473	58.5	+15.1
Labour	George Burns	4,165	37.6	+37.6
Ind. Protectionist	William Brown	434	3.9	+3.9
Total formal votes		11,071	96.6	
Informal votes		391	3.4	
Turnout		11,462	60.0	
Anti-Socialist gain from Protectionist		Swing	+15.1	

==== 1903 ====
1903 Australian federal election: Denison
Party	Candidate	Votes	%	±%
Protectionist	Sir Philip Fysh	3,661	43.8	+43.8
Free Trade	Norman Cameron	3,630	43.4	+43.4
Independent	Andrew Kirk	1,064	12.7	+12.7
Total formal votes		8,355	97.0	
Informal votes		255	3.0	
Turnout		8,610	51.8	
Protectionist win		(new seat)		
