= Michael Townley (politician) =

Australian politician

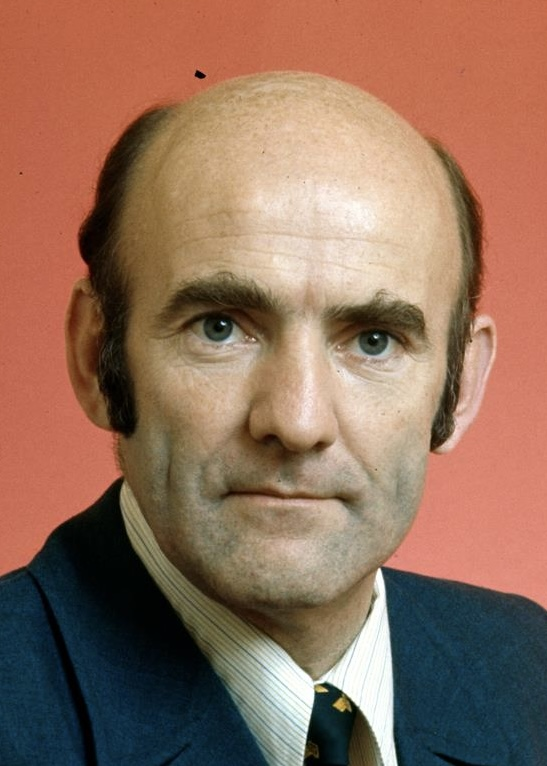
- Townley in 1974

Senator for Tasmania
- In office 1 July 1971 – 5 June 1987

Personal details
- Born: 4 November 1934 (age 91) Hobart, Tasmania, Australia
- Party: Independent (1971–1975, 1987); Liberal (1975–87)
- Relations: Rex Townley (father); Athol Townley (uncle)
- Profession: Pharmacist

Michael Townley (born 4 November 1934) is a former Australian politician and pharmacist. He served as a Senator for Tasmania from 1971 to 1987.

Townley was born in Hobart; his father Rex and uncle Athol were also prominent politicians. Before entering politics he operated several pharmacies and made regular radio and television appearances. Townley was a member of the Liberal Party but came into conflict with the state executive. At the 1970 Senate election he was elected as an independent. He initially sat on the crossbench and was re-elected in 1974, but joined the parliamentary Liberals the following year. This increase in the Coalition's numbers was one of the contributing factors to the 1975 constitutional crisis. Townley spent the remainder of his time in the Senate as a backbencher and frequently crossed the floor. He resigned from the Liberal Party and retired from the Senate before the 1987 election.

== Early life ==
Townley was born on 4 November 1934 in Hobart, Tasmania. He was the son of Winifred (née Jones) and Rex Townley. His father, a pharmacist by profession, was elected to state parliament in 1946 and was the state Liberal leader in the early 1950s. His uncle Athol was a federal MP and held ministerial office in the Menzies Government.

Townley was educated at state schools in Sassafras and Kingston, the Friends' School, and Hobart High School. He graduated from the University of Tasmania in 1956 with a degree in engineering, later studying radio astronomy in Canada at the University of Toronto for two years. On his return he completed a diploma in pharmacy at Hobart Technical College and was registered as a pharmacist in 1964. By 1968 Townley was operating three pharmacies and was also the major shareholder in a pharmaceutical company distributing medicines under his own brand. He became a public figure in Tasmania as the "Chemist of the Air", making regular radio appearances and appearing weekly on TNT (broadcasting to northern Tasmania) and twice weekly on TVT (broadcasting to southern Tasmania).

== Politics ==
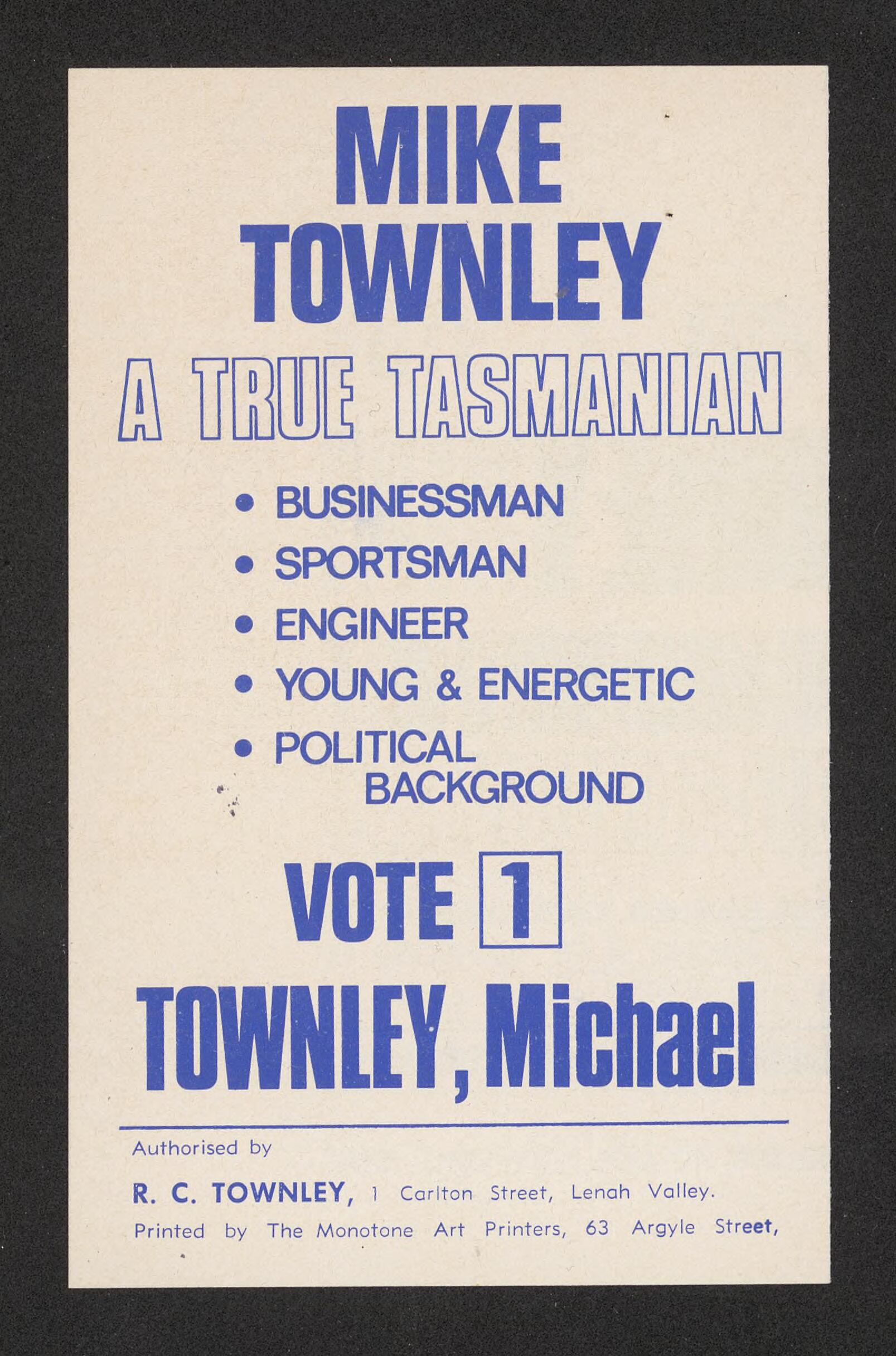
Campaign material used by Townley in 1970

Townley was approached to stand as the Liberal candidate at the 1964 Denison by-election, following his uncle's death in office, but declined for business reasons. In 1968 he was defeated for party preselection in Denison by Robert Solomon. Townley subsequently decided to contest the 1969 federal election as an unendorsed Liberal, narrowly losing to Solomon. He remained president of the party's Lenah Valley branch until December 1969, when he resigned to pre-empt a no-confidence motion.

In May 1970, Townley announced he would contest the 1970 half-Senate election as an independent, after being rejected from the Liberal ticket by the state executive. He did not immediately resign his membership of the party. He was elected with 13.8 percent of the first-preference votes to a term beginning on 1 July 1971. He sat on the Senate crossbench with the five Democratic Labor Party (DLP) senators and two other independents, Syd Negus and Reg Turnbull.

Following a double dissolution, Townley was re-elected at the 1974 election with 5.6 percent of the vote, assisted by the lower quotas in place. He initially shared the balance of power in the Senate with Steele Hall of the Liberal Movement, but on 11 February 1975 he joined the parliamentary Liberal Party.

Townley resigned from the Liberal Party on 5 June 1987, anticipating that he would be demoted to an "unwinnable" spot on the party's ticket at the next federal election. He attributed this to his public support of Andrew Peacock against the incumbent party leader John Howard.

== Personal life ==
Townley obtained a private pilot's licence at a young age and also trained with the Royal Australian Air Force (RAAF) as a national serviceman. In July 1975 his aircraft was badly damaged following an aborted takeoff in Grovedale, Victoria, although he and his two passengers were uninjured.
