= 1964 Denison by-election =

Election in Tasmania, Australia

15 February 1964
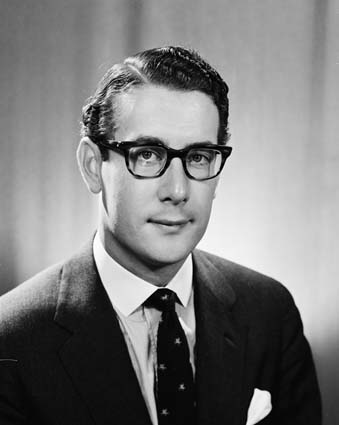
	First party	Second party
		ALP
Candidate	Adrian Gibson	Donald Finlay
Party	Liberal	Labor
First preference vote	16,953	14,367
Percentage	51.1%	43.3%
Swing	▼0.2pp	▲4.1pp
TPP	55.3%	44.7%
TPP swing	▼2.11pp	▲2.11pp
MP before election
Athol Townley
Liberal
Elected MP
Kevin Newman
Adrian Gibson

A by-election for the Australian House of Representatives seat of Denison was held on 15 February 1964. This was triggered by the death of Liberal MP and former Defence Minister Athol Townley.

The by-election was won by Liberal candidate Adrian Gibson.

== Results ==
Denison by-election, 1964
Party	Candidate	Votes	%	±%
Liberal	Adrian Gibson	16,953	51.1	−0.2
Labor	Donald Finlay	14,367	43.3	+4.1
Democratic Labor	Harold Senior	1,563	4.7	−1.7
Independent	Bernard Symmons	277	0.8	+0.8
Total formal votes		33,160	98.5	
Informal votes		491	1.5	
Turnout		33,651	91.4	
Two-party-preferred result
Liberal	Adrian Gibson		55.3	−2.1
Labor	Donald Finlay		44.7	+2.1
Liberal hold		Swing	−2.1	
