= John Gellibrand =

Australian Army general and politician (1872–1945)

Sir John Gellibrand KCB, DSO & Bar
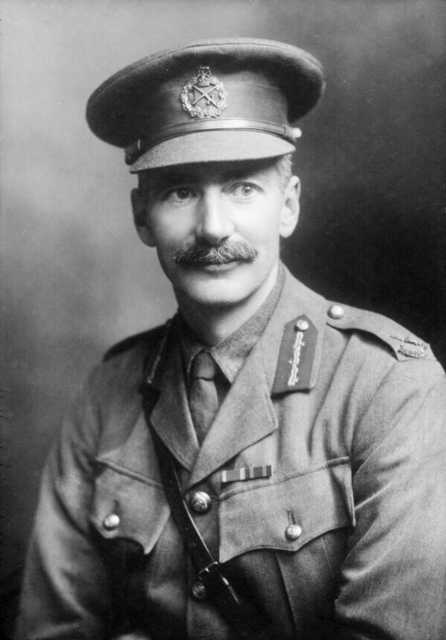
- Major General Sir John Gellibrand

Member of the House of Representatives for Denison
- In office 14 November 1925 – 17 November 1928
- Preceded by: David O'Keefe
- Succeeded by: Charles Culley

8th Chief Commissioner of Victoria Police
- In office 1 September 1920 – 7 February 1922
- Preceded by: Sir George Steward
- Succeeded by: Alexander Nicholson

Personal details
- Born: 5 December 1872 Leintwarden, Tasmania
- Died: 3 June 1945 (aged 72) Murrindindi, Victoria
- Party: Nationalist
- Relations: Joseph Gellibrand (grandfather)

Military service
- Allegiance: United Kingdom; Australia
- Branch/service: British Army (1892–1912); Australian Army (1914–1922)
- Years of service: 1892–1912; 1914–1922
- Rank: Major General
- Commands: 3rd Division (1918–1922); 12th Brigade (1917–1918); 6th Brigade (1916–1917); 12th Battalion (1915–1916)
- Battles/wars: Second Boer War; First World War; Gallipoli Campaign; Battle of Pozières; Second Battle of Bullecourt; Battle of Dernancourt; Battle of Amiens; Battle of the Hindenburg Line
- Awards: Knight Commander of the Order of the Bath; Distinguished Service Order & Bar; Mentioned in Despatches (7); Distinguished Service Medal (United States); Officer of the Legion of Honour (France); Croix de Guerre (France)

Major General Sir John Gellibrand, KCB, DSO & Bar (5 December 1872 – 3 June 1945) was a senior Australian Army officer in the First World War, Chief Commissioner of the Victoria Police from 1920 to 1922, and a member of the Australian House of Representatives, representing the Tasmanian Division of Denison for the Nationalist Party from 1925 to 1928.

The scion of a prominent Tasmanian family, Gellibrand graduated top of the Royal Military College, Sandhurst, and was commissioned a second lieutenant in the South Lancashire Regiment (The Prince of Wales's Volunteers) in October 1893. He served in the South African War, participating in the Relief of Ladysmith. In May 1900 he was promoted to captain in the Manchester Regiment, and served on St Helena where its primary task was guarding Boer prisoners of war. He graduated from the Staff College, Camberley, in December 1907, and served on the staff of the garrison commander in Ceylon. Frustrated at the poor prospects for promotion, he resigned his British Army commission in April 1912 and returned to Tasmania to grow apples.

When the First World War broke out in August 1914, Gellibrand offered his services, and was appointed to the First Australian Imperial Force (AIF) as a captain on the staff of the 1st Division. He landed at Anzac Cove on 25 April 1915, and served in the Gallipoli Campaign until he was wounded on 11 May. He returned to Anzac on 31 May 1915, but put in for a transfer to the staff of the 2nd Division. In December, he was given command of the 12th Infantry Battalion, the 1st Division's Tasmanian battalion, then resting on Lemnos, but did not return to Anzac, which was evacuated in December. On 1 March 1916 he was promoted to brigadier general and given command of the 6th Infantry Brigade, which he led in the Battle of Pozières and Second Battle of Bullecourt. He was relieved of his command at his own request, and posted to the AIF Depots in the United Kingdom. He returned to the Western Front in November 1917 to command of the 12th Infantry Brigade, which he led in the Battle of Dernancourt in April 1918. He was promoted to major general on 1 June 1918, and commanded the 3rd Division in the Battle of Amiens and the Battle of the Hindenburg Line.

After the war, Gellibrand returned to Tasmania. In 1919 he accepted the post of Public Service Commissioner in Tasmania. He investigated the conditions of the service, and recommended reforms. He then took up a position as Chief Commissioner of Victoria Police in Victoria, but failed to get the Victorian government to agree with his recommendations for reform, and resigned in 1922. While in Melbourne, Gellibrand commanded the 3rd Division, but had to resign when he returned to Tasmania in 1922. He entered Federal politics in 1925, and was elected the member for Denison. He was defeated in the 1928 and 1929 elections, and returned to farming, first in Tasmania, and then in Victoria. In the late 1930s, he was consulted by Prime Ministers Joseph Lyons and Robert Menzies about defence matters. He campaigned for an increase in the size of the Australian Army, and, after the outbreak of the Second World War, lobbied the Menzies government to appoint Major General Sir Thomas Blamey as Commander in Chief of the Army. In June 1940, he was appointed commandant of the Victorian Volunteer Defence Corps, the Australian version of the British Home Guard, but ill-health forced him to resign.

== Early life and military career ==
John Gellibrand (known as Jack to his family) was born at Leintwarden, near Ouse in Tasmania, on 5 December 1872, the sixth child and third son of Thomas Lloyd Gellibrand, a grazier, landowner and local politician and his wife Isabella née Brown. Thomas Lloyd was the son of Joseph Gellibrand, a member of the Tasmanian House of Assembly from 1856 to 1861, and a captain in a Militia unit, the 3rd Rifles (Southern Tasmanian Volunteers). Gellibrand had two older brothers, Tom and Walter; three sisters, Annie, Lina and Mary; and a younger brother, Blake. His father died on 9 November 1874, and on 7 February 1876, his mother took her seven children to live in England, sailing on the clipper Sobroan. En route she met the ship's surgeon, Dr Edward Clayton Ling, and they were married in Saxmundham, Suffolk, where his family lived, on 28 December 1878. They had two more children, a daughter, Muriel, and a son, Maurice, but Ling died on 28 June 1882.

Gellibrand was initially educated at Crespigny Preparatory School at Aldeburgh in Suffolk. In 1883 the family moved to Frankfurt-am-Main, Germany, where he continued his education before completing it at the King's School, Canterbury in 1888 and 1889. After a visit to Tasmania with his mother and sister Annie in 1891, he returned to Frankfurt-am-Main in September 1891 to study for the entrance exam to the Royal Military College, Sandhurst. In Frankfurt he met and courted Elizabeth Helena Breul, known as Elsie to her family, who would later become his wife. He passed the entrance exam, topping the list of candidates, which was published on 17 August 1892, and entered on 1 September. He graduated at the top of his class of 87 on 18 October 1893, and was awarded the General Proficiency Sword for gaining the highest aggregate marks in the final exams. He was commissioned a second lieutenant in the South Lancashire Regiment (The Prince of Wales's Volunteers) on 21 October 1893, and was posted to its 1st Battalion, then on garrison duty in Birr, County Offaly, in Ireland.

Gellibrand married Elsie in an Anglican ceremony at the parish church in Ilkley, Yorkshire, on 27 July 1894. He attended a course at the School of Musketry in February and March 1895, qualifying him as an instructor in small arms and the Maxim gun, and was promoted to lieutenant on 24 April 1895. He commanded C Company from October 1895 to October 1897. His salary was insufficient to live on, so Gellibrand and Elsie supplemented it by translating German works by Helmuth von Moltke the Elder, Prince Kraft zu Hohenlohe-Ingelfingen and others into English, for which they were paid 10 shillings per thousands words. In early 1894 he had taken advantage of his fluent German to qualify as a translator. Their first child, Elizabeth Joan, was born in London on 30 May 1899.

In August 1899, Gellibrand easily passed the examinations for promotion to captain, but was passed over for the post of adjutant of the 2nd Battalion of the South Lancashire Regiment, then based in St Helens, Merseyside. In October the post became vacant again, and this time he secured it. The South African War had broken out, and the 2nd Battalion embarked for South Africa on 30 November, but Gellibrand was left behind, in charge of the regimental depot. He eventually received orders to embark for South Africa with reinforcements on 3 January 1900. He arrived in South Africa on 25 January 1900. Soon after, he was given command of D Company. As such he participated in the relief of Ladysmith, leading a bayonet charge on 27 February. His company entered the town on 3 March. Five days later he became ill with typhoid, and lay in a comatose state until 3 April. He was joined in Durban by Elsie, who had made her way out to South Africa with Cecil Rhodes, and they embarked for England together on 26 May, arriving at Southampton on 18 June.

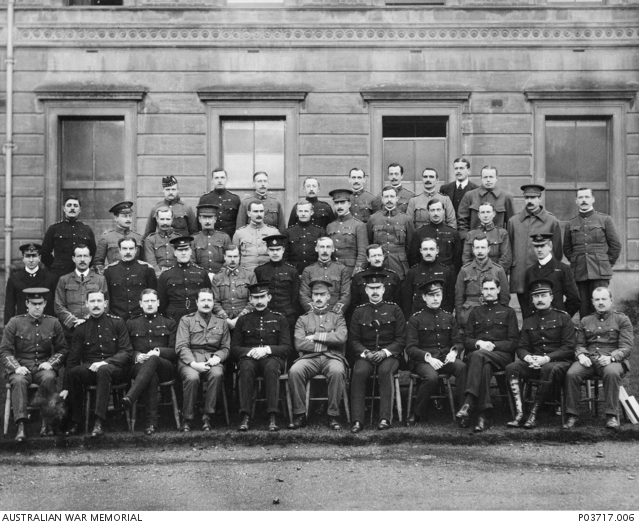
Group portrait of officers at the British Army Staff College, Camberley in 1906. Gellibrand is in the second row, second from right. Brudenell White is in the back row, third from the left.

On 26 May 1900, Gellibrand was promoted to captain in the newly raised 3rd Battalion of the Manchester Regiment, joining his new command at Aldershot on 29 November 1900, where his second daughter, Cynthia Lloyd was born on 22 June 1901. On 28 July 1902, the battalion moved to St Helena where its primary task was guarding of the 6,000 Boer prisoners of war there. These were released when the war ended in May 1902, and most of the battalion moved to Middelburg, in South Africa. Gellibrand remained on St Helena, where he became a justice of the peace and garrison adjutant, until he too left for South Africa on 5 January 1904, becoming adjutant on 24 January. The announcement in July 1904 that the 3rd and 4th Battalions of the Manchester Regiment were to be disbanded ended any prospect of further promotion in the near future. In August 1905, Gellibrand passed the staff college entrance exam, and he embarked for England with his family on 28 December. He entered the Staff College, Camberley, in January 1906. He graduated on 2 December 1907. Staff college was normally followed by a staff posting, and in March 1908 he was informed by the commandant of the college, Brigadier General Henry Wilson, that his next posting would be to Ceylon, as Deputy Assistant Adjutant and Quartermaster General (DAA & QMG) on the staff of the garrison commander.

Gellibrand arrived in Colombo with his family on 22 May 1908. The family increased when their third child, Thomas Ianson, was born on 29 November 1908. He got along well with his first commander, Brigadier General R. C. B. Lawrence, but much less so with his successor, Brigadier General A. J. Whitacre Allen. As the seventh most senior captain in his regiment, he could expect that promotion to major in seven or eight years. Frustrated at this, he took leave in July 1910, and travelled to Tasmania to find out what the prospects were there. On 27 April 1912, his four-year posting to Ceylon ended. He resigned his commission, and returned to Tasmania with his family, reaching Hobart on 14 June 1912. He hoped to be able to take over one of his family's properties, but none were willing to sell out to him, so he bought an apple orchard at Risdon, and settled into life as a farmer. Charles Bean later wrote:

It was a constant wonder, to those who knew in Gellibrand one of the best and ablest officers in any army with the experience of the Australians, how a man with these qualities and with staff college training could have been allowed—much less almost compelled—to slip out of the British Army. It was standing evidence of the hopeless defects in a system under which staffs were often appointed on the principles of a hunt-club.

== First World War ==
When the First World War broke out on 4 August 1914, Gellibrand offered his services to the commandant of the 6th Military District (Tasmania). On 20 August 1914, he was appointed to the Australian Imperial Force (AIF) as a captain, and given the post of Deputy Assistant Quartermaster General (DAQMG) on the staff of the 1st Division. Staff college graduates like Gellibrand were scarce in Australia; only six Australian Army officers had graduated from staff colleges. There were also four of the British Army's graduates on secondment. For the 1st Division's General Staff (G) Branch, the division commander, Major General William Bridges, chose two of Gellibrand's Camberley classmates, Lieutenant Colonel Brudenell White from the Australian Army, and Major Duncan Glasfurd from the British Army, and Captain Thomas Blamey, an Australian Army officer who had graduated from the Staff College, Quetta. The Administration (A) Branch was headed by the AA & QMG, Colonel Victor Sellheim. Lieutenant Colonel W. G. Patterson was his deputy, the DAA & QMG. As DAQMG, Gellibrand was responsible for logistics; Major Cecil Foott, an Australian 1913 Camberley graduate, was the Deputy Assistant Adjutant General (DAAG), responsible for personnel matters. On 23 September 1914 Gellibrand was promoted to major, the usual rank for his post.

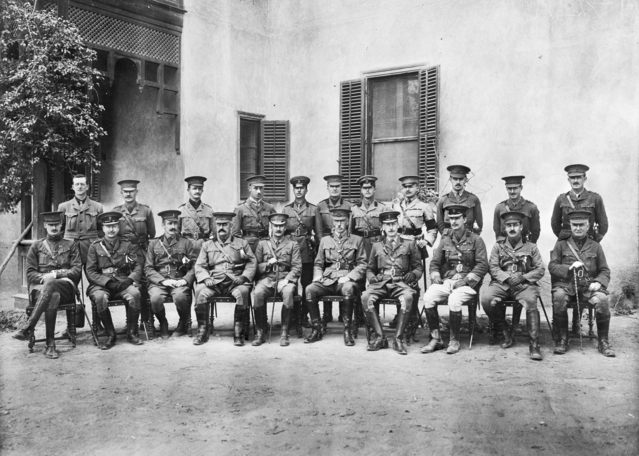
Group portrait of 1st Division staff Officers at Mena Camp, December 1914. Gellibrand is in the front row, third from the left.

The 1st Division headquarters left Port Melbourne on the Orient liner SS Orvieto on 21 October 1914, which reached Alexandria on 3 December. Sellheim left to command the new Intermediate Base Depot on 12 January 1915. Patterson stepped up to become AA & QMG, and Gellibrand to become DAA & QMG. Foott took Gellibrand's place as DAQMG, and Captain Thomas Griffiths became DAAG. Gellibrand landed at Anzac Cove with the second echelon of 1st Division Headquarters at around 09:00 on 25 April 1915. As DAA & QMG, he was responsible for supply. He helped organise the beach parties, rounded up stragglers, and organised the movement of supplies and ammunition forward. Patterson had a nervous breakdown and was evacuated on 28 April 1915, Gellibrand performed his job as well until Lieutenant Colonel John Forsyth was appointed AA & QMG on 7 May 1915.

Gellibrand was disappointed at not being appointed AA & QMG, but Bridges was unimpressed with Gellibrand's staff work. He felt that Gellibrand had mishandled the move of the 2nd Infantry Brigade to Cape Helles, where it participated in the First Battle of Krithia. He also expected Gellibrand to organise a proper officers' mess at Gallipoli and was annoyed at the poor quality of what Gellibrand had scrounged from ships' canteen supplies. Gellibrand might have even been dismissed by Bridges but fate intervened. On 1 May Gellibrand was wounded in the ankle by shrapnel. Then, on 11 May, while laughing at two men whose water bottles had been holed, he received a severe wound in his right shoulder and was evacuated to the hospital ship HMHS Gascon. While it was still anchored off Anzac Cove, Bridges was wounded on 15 May and brought on board the same ship (and to the same bed, Gellibrand was moved out of the way), where Bridges died on 18 May 1915.

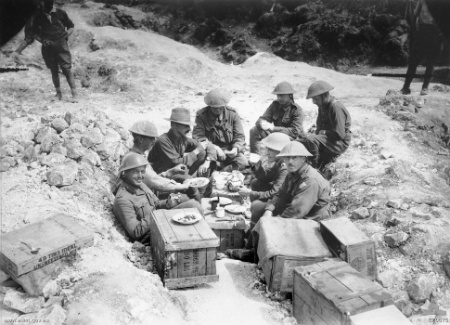
Gellibrand (wearing a hat) and his staff having breakfast in a shell hole in Sausage Valley.

Gellibrand returned to Anzac on 31 May 1915, to find that Forsyth had been given command of the 2nd Infantry Brigade and Foott, who had been his subordinate, had become AA & QMG and was now his superior. Gellibrand took this in bad grace although Foott was in fact the senior major. Dissatisfied, Gellibrand put in for a transfer to the 2nd Division, then being formed in Egypt under the command of Major General James Gordon Legge. He became DAA & QMG of the 2nd Division in Egypt on 21 August 1915. Because the 2nd Division's AA & QMG, Lieutenant Colonel Thomas Blamey, was forced to remain in Egypt for medical reasons, Gellibrand became acting AA & QMG on 29 August, embarking for Anzac once again on the SS Southland that day. On 2 September, the ship was torpedoed. Gellibrand eventually reached Anzac on 6 September. The August offensive was over, and Gellibrand settled into routine administration. He was struck down by typhoid again on 11 October and evacuated a second time, returning on 23 October 1915. For his services at Anzac, Gellibrand was twice mentioned in despatches, and awarded the Distinguished Service Order (DSO).

On 4 December 1915, Gellibrand received a promotion to lieutenant colonel, and was given command of the 12th Infantry Battalion, the 1st Division's Tasmanian battalion, then resting on Lemnos. It did not return to Anzac, which was evacuated on 20 December 1915. Instead, the battalion returned to Egypt, arriving at Alexandria on 6 January 1916. Gellibrand would not lead it into battle. On 1 March 1916 he was again promoted, this time to full colonel and temporary brigadier general, and given command of the 6th Infantry Brigade, on the specific request of Legge. Apparently Gellibrand had greatly impressed Legge during his time as AA & QMG of the 2nd Division. The 6th Infantry Brigade sailed for the Western Front just a few days later, on 19 March 1916, and entered the line there on 10 April. On 31 May, Gellibrand was wounded by a German shell that had landed close to his headquarters and was evacuated to England, returning on 28 June. The brigade fought at Pozières, where it performed well in the attack on 4 August. He was mentioned in despatches once more.

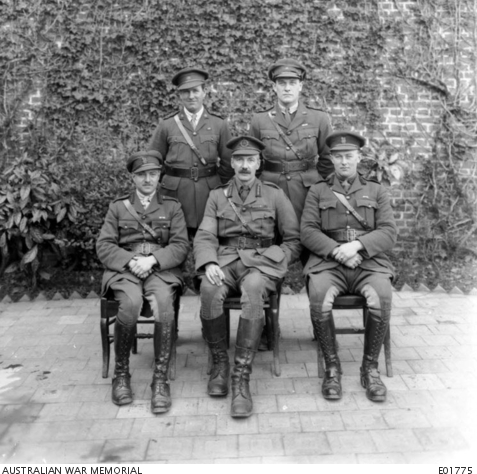
Gellibrand (front and centre) with his 12th Infantry Brigade staff officers

Gellibrand went to England on leave on 25 November 1916. While there he had four teeth extracted and did not return until December. He was evacuated again on 13 December 1916 with influenza, returning on 30 January 1917. In the meantime he was promoted to brevet major in the British Army's Reserve of Officers List, which he considered an insult. He was acting commander of the 2nd Division until 5 March 1917, directing it in probing attacks against Malt Trench when it was suspected that the Germans were withdrawing to the Hindenburg Line. The advance of the 6th Infantry Brigade to the Hindenburg Line began well but ended with a costly, ill-planned and ill-executed attack on Noreuil. This caused his division commander, Major General Nevill Smyth, and corps commander, Lieutenant General William Birdwood, to lose confidence in Gellibrand, although the commander of the British Fifth Army, General Sir Hubert Gough, considered it a risk that he had accepted. Gellibrand received a fourth mention in despatches.

The 6th Infantry Brigade's next attack was against the Hindenburg Line near Bullecourt, in the Second Battle of Bullecourt. In this attack, Gellibrand had his headquarters well forward and his planning was meticulous and detailed. Nonetheless, the attack was very nearly a disaster, and only decisive and forceful leadership from Gellibrand retrieved the situation. For this battle he was awarded a bar to his DSO, made a Companion of the Order of the Bath, and was mentioned in despatches. The bar's citation reads:

For conspicuous gallantry and devotion to duty. His Brigade reached its third objective, but was ordered back owing to the division on the right being held up at the first objective. His Brigade repelled several counter-attacks and held on when the Brigade on the right was in difficulties. It was largely owing to his influence and presence in this advanced position that the operations were successful.

From 25 May to 5 June 1917, he was again acting commander of the 2nd Division. He did not get along well with Smyth, Brigadier General Robert Smith of the 5th Infantry Brigade, or Colonel A. H. Bridges, the division's chief of staff. According to Bean, "misunderstandings between himself and the divisional staff had caused Gellibrand to ask for relief from the brigade command. Birdwood was eager to compose the difficulty, but Gellibrand would not take the opportunity offered for explanation. Gellibrand's request was therefore granted."

Gellibrand was sent to the AIF Depots in the United Kingdom as Brigadier General, General Staff (BGGS) to Major General James Whiteside McCay. McCay was known as a hard task master, but he had nothing but praise for the work of Gellibrand, who helped him overhaul the organisation and the training syllabus. Likewise, Gellibrand held McCay in high regard. Gellibrand returned to the Western Front on 14 November 1917, taking over command of the 12th Infantry Brigade vice Brigadier General James Campbell Robertson, who was returning to Australia on leave. He soon placed his own distinctive stamp on his new command. In April 1918, the brigade was committed to battle in the path of the advancing German Army in the Battle of Dernancourt. The brigade held and defeated the German advance.

On 30 May 1918, Major General John Monash was appointed to command the Australian Corps, and Birdwood selected Gellibrand to take Monash's place in command of the 3rd Division. Gellibrand was promoted to major general on 1 June 1918. He found the 3rd Division a difficult assignment. The division staff had been together for two years, and were accustomed to Monash. Other brigadier generals were understandably disappointed at missing out on a division command, particularly Walter McNicoll. At the Battle of Amiens, Monash and Gellibrand had serious disagreements over tactics and troop dispositions. Gellibrand disliked part of the plan that called for the leapfrogging of divisions, generally regarded as Monash's master stroke. Monash overruled him. On 27 September 1918, the two had a more heated clash during the Battle of the Hindenburg Line over the merits of Gellibrand's intention to attack on a narrow front, something not normally considered advisable. Gellibrand angrily claimed that his battalions were only 200 strong. Monash countered that some were 600 strong. The attack went in as Monash directed, and was successful because the Germans began to withdraw. Monash later wrote that:

Gellibrand was a man of interesting personality, more a philosopher and student than a man of action. His great personal bravery and his high sense of duty compensated in great measure for some tendency to uncertainty in executive action... His command of the 3rd Division during the last five months of active fighting was characterised by complete success in battle. His temperament and methods sometimes involved him in embarrassments on the administrative side of his work; but he succeeded in retaining to the last the whole-hearted confidence of his troops.

For his services, Gellibrand was created a Knight Commander of the Order of the Bath in June 1919. He was appointed an Officer of the Legion of Honour, and awarded the Croix de Guerre by the French, and the Distinguished Service Medal by the Americans. He was also mentioned in despatches twice more.

== Post-war ==
After the war, Gellibrand returned to Tasmania. He boarded the troopship RMS Kaisar-i-Hind in London on 4 May 1919, and reached Hobart on 30 June, after a long sea voyage, a rail trip from Fremantle to Melbourne, passage across the Bass Strait, and a week in quarantine on Bruny Island due to the 1918 flu pandemic. As Tasmania's highest-ranking war hero, he was greeted by the Governor of Tasmania, Sir Francis Newdegate. In August 1919 he accepted an offer from the Premier of Tasmania, Walter Lee, of the post of Public Service Commissioner. He investigated the conditions of the service, and found that public servants were agitating for a 40 per cent pay rise, as no pay rises had been granted since before the war. He came up with a plan for a temporary reclassification of positions, which would offer some relief, at a cost to the government of £12,000. This was implemented in December. On 19 July 1920, he was formally knighted by the Prince of Wales.

Gellibrand resigned as Public Service Commissioner to take up a position as Chief Commissioner of Victoria Police in Victoria on 2 September 1920. The force he inherited was under-manned, poorly equipped, overworked and inadequately paid. Gellibrand felt that urgent action was required to increase force numbers and improve working conditions, but was unable to get his recommendations approved. He clashed with his political master, the Chief Secretary, Matthew Baird, and Gellibrand resigned on 7 February 1922. While in Melbourne, Gellibrand was appointed commander of the 3rd Division on 8 February 1921. He had to resign on 20 February 1922, when he returned to Tasmania.

Concerned about the plight of fellow ex-servicemen, whose businesses were often failing, Gellibrand banded together with like-minded individuals to form the Hobart Remembrance Club. This organisation aimed to support ex-servicemen by providing employment and support for their businesses. The Hobart Club inspired the formation of Legacy Australia in Melbourne, which over time became a national movement, expanding its scope to the care of ex-servicemen's widows and their families. The Hobart Club did not join Legacy until 1940, but Charles Bean wrote in 1944 that "coming back to the great and good man from whose original work it all sprang—there was a time when some of us thought that the best monument to John Gellibrand might be the story of Second Bullecourt. Now I feel there will be an even better—the record of Legacy."

Gellibrand entered Federal politics in the November 1925 election, at which he was elected the member for Denison on the Nationalist Party of Australia ticket. In his campaign speeches he exploited the fear of communism. As the member for Denison, he supported increased Federal funding for Tasmania, and called for improvements in the way the Australian Army trained future leaders. He was involved in the campaign for the 1926 referendum, which failed. He lost his seat in the 1928 election, and failed to regain it in the 1929 election. After that he returned to farming at Greenhills. He also bought a foreclosed 214-hectare (530-acre) property near Smithton, Tasmania, called Garth, from the AMP Society, of which he was a director. On 1 August 1936, he purchased a new property, Balaclava, at Murrindindi, Victoria, not far from Yea, Victoria, where his son Tom had a farm, and made his home there, selling the properties in Tasmania.

In the late 1930s, he was consulted by Prime Ministers Joseph Lyons and Robert Menzies about defence matters. He campaigned for an increase in the size of the Australian Army, writing letters to newspapers, and a series of articles for Reveille, the Returned Sailors and Soldiers Imperial League of Australia's organ. After the outbreak of the Second World War, he lobbied the Menzies government to appoint Blamey as Commander in Chief of the Army. In June 1940, he was appointed commandant of the Victorian Volunteer Defence Corps, the Australian version of the Home Guard, but ill-health forced him to resign in July 1940, to be replaced by Foott.

Gellibrand died at Balaclava from a cerebral haemorrhage on 3 June 1945, and was buried in Yea Cemetery. He was survived by his wife and children. His funeral service was attended by Major Generals James Cannan, Eric Plant and Charles Lloyd.

== Honours and awards ==
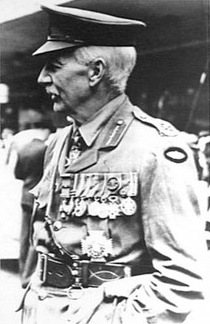
Gellibrand on the occasion of the last Anzac Day march led by him – in Melbourne on 25 April 1939.

Knight Commander of the Order of the Bath (KCB)	6 June 1919
Companion of the Order of the Bath (CB)	1 June 1917
Companion of the Distinguished Service Order and Bar (DSO and Bar)	2 May 1916; 15 June 1917 (Bar)
Queen's South Africa Medal	With "Tugela Heights" and "Relief of Ladysmith" clasps
1914–15 Star	
British War Medal	
Victory Medal with oak leaves for mentions in despatches	Mentioned in Despatches seven times
King George V Silver Jubilee Medal	1935
King George VI Coronation Medal	1937
Officer of the Legion of Honour	(France) 28 January 1919
Croix de guerre with Palm	(France) 19 August 1919
Distinguished Service Medal	(United States) 11 July 1919

== Notes ==
Parliament of Australia
Preceded by David O'Keefe	Member for Denison; 1925–1928	Succeeded by Charles Culley
Police appointments
Preceded by George Charles Thomas Steward	Chief Commissioner of Victoria Police; 1920–1922	Succeeded by Alexander Nicholson
Military offices
Preceded by Major General Sir John Monash	General Officer Commanding 3rd Division; 1918–1922	Succeeded by Major General George Johnston
