= David O'Keefe (Australian politician) =

Australian politician (1864–1943)

The Honourable David O'Keefe CMG
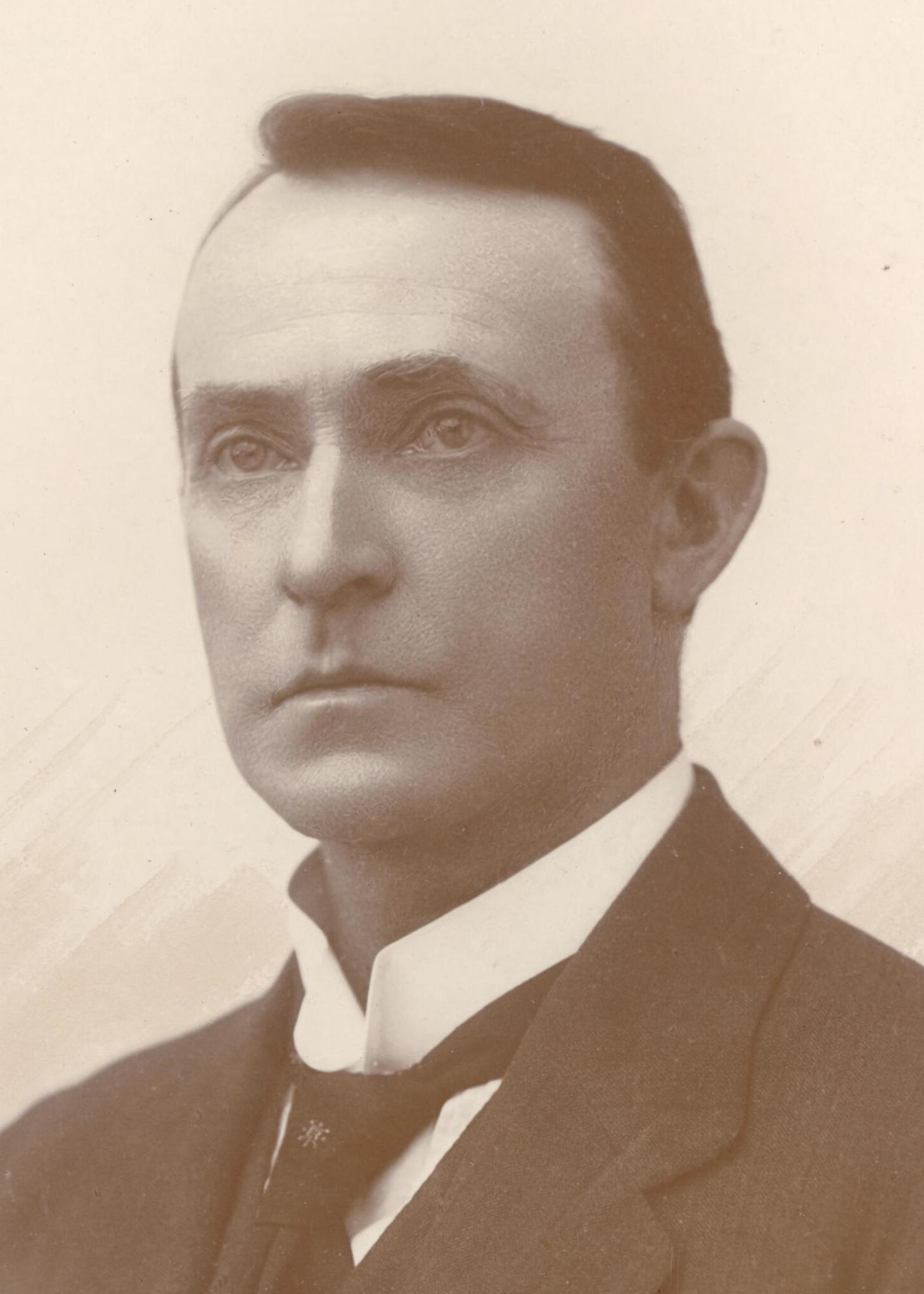

Speaker of the Tasmanian House of Assembly
- In office 18 July 1934 – 9 February 1942
- Preceded by: John Evans
- Succeeded by: John Dwyer

Member of the Tasmanian House of Assembly
- In office 9 June 1934 – 21 July 1943
- Constituency: Wilmot

Member of the Australian House of Representatives
- In office 16 December 1922 – 14 November 1925
- Preceded by: William Laird Smith
- Succeeded by: Sir John Gellibrand
- Constituency: Denison

Senator for Tasmania
- In office 1 July 1910 – 30 June 1920
- In office 29 March 1901 – 31 December 1906

Personal details
- Born: 21 August 1864 Longford, Tasmania, Australia
- Died: 21 July 1943 (aged 78) Brighton, Victoria, Australia
- Party: Labor
- Occupation: Miner; Journalist

David John O'Keefe CMG (21 August 1864 – 21 July 1943) was an Australian politician and journalist. He was a member of the Australian Labor Party (ALP) and served in both houses of federal parliament, as a Senator for Tasmania (1901–1906, 1910–1920) and holding the House of Representatives (1922–1925). He subsequently entered state parliament, serving as Speaker of the Tasmanian House of Assembly (1934–1942). Prior to entering politics he had been the editor of the Zeehan and Dundas Herald on Tasmania's west coast.

== Early life ==
O'Keefe was "probably" born on 21 August 1864 in Longford, Tasmania. He was the son of Mary Ann (née McCullagh) and David John O'Keefe, his father being a farmer. He attended the state school in Carrick until the age of 14, after which he worked as a labourer and farmhand. He moved to Beaconsfield at the age of 17 and worked as a gold miner for four years, operating the stamp battery used to process the results of quartz reef mining. O'Keefe subsequently purchased a small newsagency in Beaconsfield, which was destroyed in a fire but later rebuilt. He was also the Beaconsfield correspondent for Launceston's Daily Telegraph.

In 1891, O'Keefe moved to Zeehan on Tasmania's west coast. He was the editor of the Zeehan and Dundas Herald from 1894 to 1899. He "made a study of mineralogy and put his learning to good use by writing many articles on west-coast mines for Tasmanian and mainland newspapers, as well as examining and reporting on many mining propositions". After resigning from the Herald in 1899 he moved to Queensland and reported for Melbourne's Argus on the copper fields at Chillagoe and Mount Garnet.

== Federal politics ==
In 1901, O'Keefe was elected to the Australian Senate, running with endorsement from the Protectionist Party, as there was no Labour Party in Tasmania at the time; however, he joined the Australian Labor Party caucus in Parliament. He was defeated in 1906, but re-elected in 1910, serving until his defeat in 1919 (taking effect in 1920). O'Keefe served as Chairman of Committees from 1910 to 1914.

In 1922, he was elected to the House of Representatives, defeating Labor-turned-Nationalist MP William Laird Smith for the seat of Denison. He was the first Tasmanian to have served in both houses of federal parliament.

== Later life ==
He was defeated in 1925 by Nationalist Sir John Gellibrand and worked in Western Australia for some time before returning to Tasmania in 1931. In 1934 O'Keefe was elected to the Tasmanian House of Assembly, immediately taking the position of Speaker. He held the Speaker's position until 1942 and died the following year.

== Personal life ==
In 1897, O'Keefe married Sara Frances (née Wilson), with whom he had four children. He was widowed in 1921 and remarried in 1924 to Agnes Hughes (née Blong). He died while on a trip to Melbourne on 21 July 1943 at Brighton, Victoria.

Parliament of Australia
Preceded by William Laird Smith	Member for Denison; 1922–1925	Succeeded by John Gellibrand
Tasmanian House of Assembly
Preceded by John Evans	Speaker of the Tasmanian House of Assembly; 1934–1942	Succeeded by John Dwyer
