= Charles Culley =

Australian politician

The Honourable Charles Culley CMG
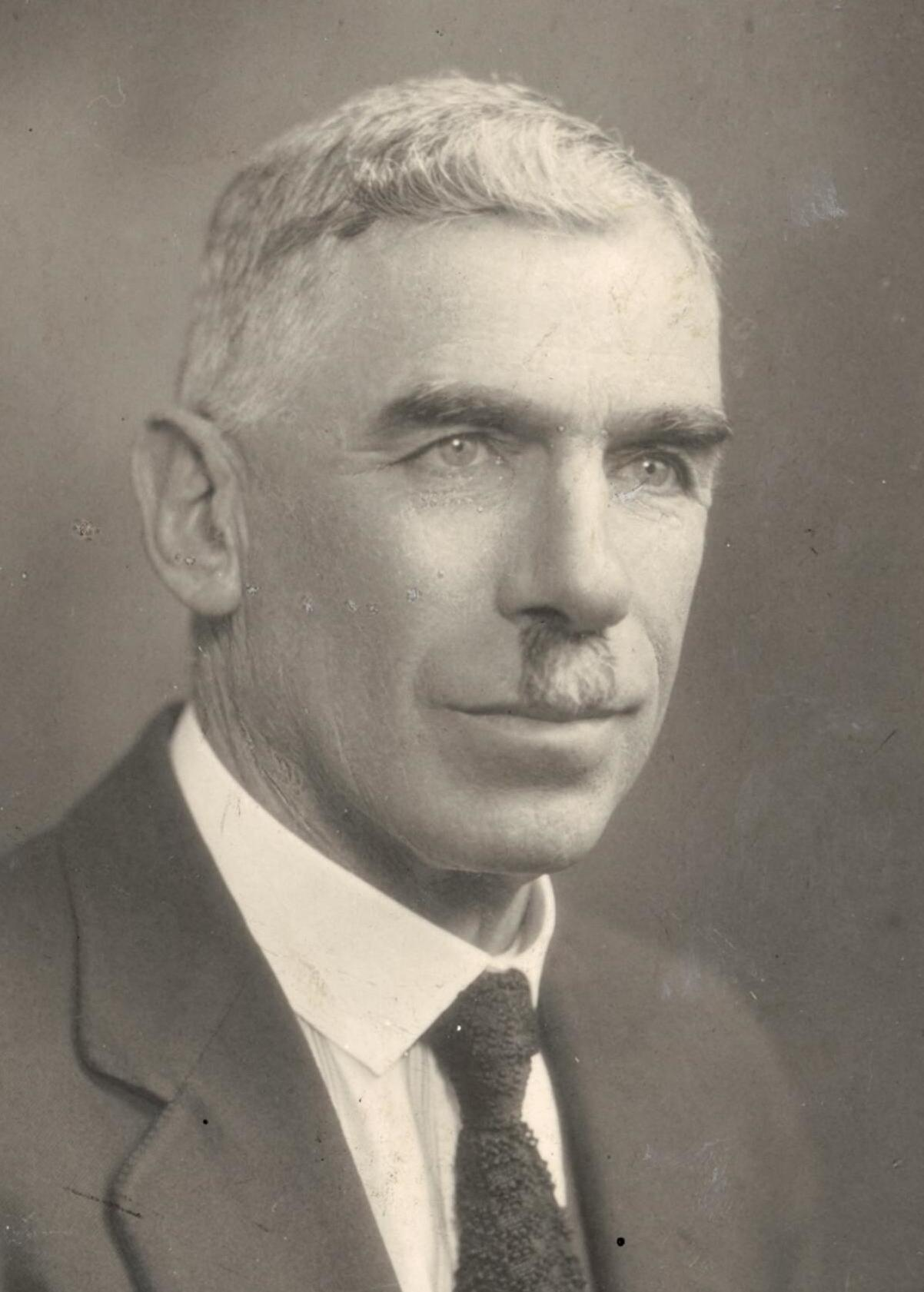

Member of the Australian Parliament for Denison
- In office 17 November 1928 – 19 December 1931
- Preceded by: John Gellibrand
- Succeeded by: Arthur Hutchin

Personal details
- Born: 16 April 1877 Brighton, Tasmania
- Died: 10 June 1949 (aged 72) New Town, Tasmania
- Party: Australian Labor Party
- Spouse: Mary Jane Pope
- Occupation: Miner, unionist

Charles Ernest Culley CMG (16 April 1877 – 10 June 1949) was an Australian politician. He was a member of the Australian Labor Party (ALP) and served in the Australian House of Representatives (1928–1931) and Tasmanian House of Assembly (1934–1948). He was an assistant minister in the federal Scullin government and later became a minister in the Tasmanian state government.

== Early life ==
Culley was born at Broadmarsh, near Brighton, Tasmania and attended primary school. He worked in stables and was occasionally a jockey. He later worked as a miner at Broken Hill, Beaconsfield and Tullah and married Mary Jane Pope, in 1906. He was elected secretary of the Amalgamated Miners' Association in 1912. He moved to Hobart in 1913 and became prominent in the union movement. He was a long-serving secretary of the Builders' Labourers Union and state secretary of the Federated Liquor and Allied Industries Employees' Union of Australia; he was also secretary and president of the Tasmanian Female Confectioners Union and state president of the Australian Textile Workers Union. He was president of the Hobart Trades Hall Council for most of the period from 1934 to 1944 and also served as president of the state Labor Party.

== Early political career ==
Culley was elected to the Tasmanian House of Assembly seat of Denison for the Australian Labor Party at the 1922 election. He lost his seat in the 1928 state election, but won the federal seat of Denison at the 1928 federal election. When Joseph Lyons resigned from the Scullin Ministry in March 1931, Culley became Assistant Minister for Transport and War Service Homes, but in June he resigned in protest at cabinet's support for the fiscally-conservative Premiers' Plan to deal with the Great Depression. He lost his seat at the 1931 election.

== Return to state politics ==
In 1934, Culley was elected to the state seat of Denison. He was chairman of the Parliamentary Standing Committee on Public Works from 1934 to 1943. He was Minister for Mines from 1942 to 1943 and then Chief Secretary and Minister for Transport. In 1946, he did not seek re-election to the ministry due to his poor health and he retired from parliament in August 1948.

Culley was appointed a Companion of the Order of St Michael and St George (CMG) in 1947. He died at the Hobart suburb of New Town in 1949; a state funeral was held at St David's' Cathedral and he was cremated at the Cornelian Bay Crematorium. He was survived by his wife, a daughter and four sons.

== Notes ==
Parliament of Australia
Preceded by John Gellibrand	Member for Denison; 1928–1931	Succeeded by Arthur Hutchin
