= Arthur Beck =

Australian politician (1892–1965)

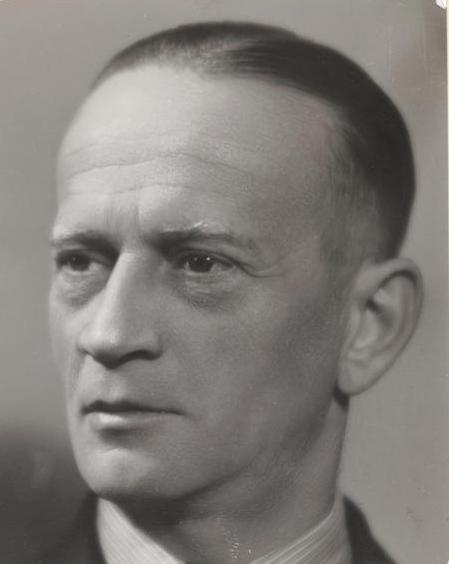

Member of the Australian Parliament for Denison
- In office 21 September 1940 – 21 August 1943
- Preceded by: Gerald Mahoney
- Succeeded by: Frank Gaha

Personal details
- Born: 8 July 1892 Launceston, Tasmania
- Died: 28 November 1965 (aged 73)
- Party: United Australia Party
- Occupation: Boot importer

Arthur James Beck (8 July 1892 – 28 November 1965) was an Australian politician. Born in Launceston, Tasmania, he was educated at Launceston Grammar School before becoming a boot importer. He sat on Hobart City Council before undertaking military service 1914–1918. In 1940, he was elected to the Australian House of Representatives as the United Australia Party member for Denison, defeating sitting Labor MP Gerald Mahoney. He was defeated in 1943 by Labor candidate Frank Gaha. He turned to a business career and returned to Hobart City Council. Beck died in 1965.

Parliament of Australia
Preceded by Gerald Mahoney	Member for Denison; 1940–1943	Succeeded by Frank Gaha
