= Gerald Mahoney =

Australian politician

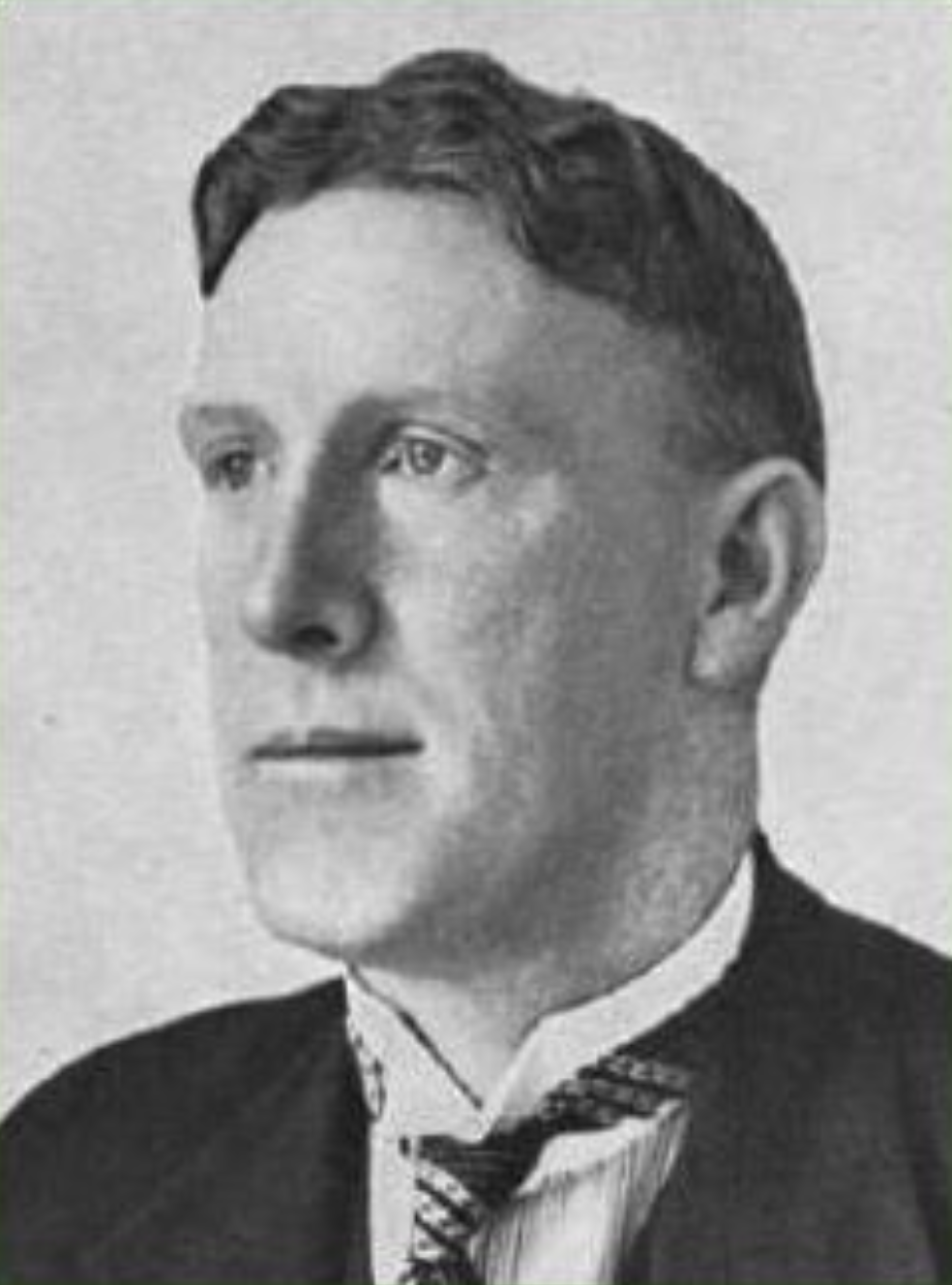

Member of the Australian Parliament for Denison
- In office 15 September 1934 – 21 September 1940
- Preceded by: Arthur Hutchin
- Succeeded by: Arthur Beck

Personal details
- Born: 24 May 1892 Railton, Tasmania
- Died: 16 September 1955 (aged 63) Hobart, Tasmania, Australia
- Party: Australian Labor Party
- Occupation: Painter

Gerald William Mahoney (24 May 1892 – 16 September 1955) was an Australian politician. He was an Australian Labor Party member of the Tasmanian House of Assembly from 1931 to 1934 and of the Australian House of Representatives from 1934 to 1940, representing both the state and federal versions of the seat of Denison.

== Early career ==
Mahoney was born at Railton, Tasmania and was educated at Latrobe. He worked at the Mount Bischoff mine, where he became a delegate of the Federated Mining Employees Association, and later worked as a builder's painter. He was secretary of the Labor Party's Denison league in the early 1920s, was a Tasmanian delegate to the party's All Australia Congress and nominated for state Labor preselection in 1922. He rose through the trade union movement, and was president of the Zinc Workers' Union and secretary and trades hall delegate of the Painters' Union by the mid-1920s; he had also become secretary of the Operative Bricklayers' Union by the time of his election to parliament.

In 1922 he was expelled from the Labor Party along with Edmund Dwyer-Gray for disloyalty; Mahoney was alleged to have associated with people who had opposed endorsed Labor candidates, and who had endorsed direct action and "go slow" tactics and supported the Industrial Workers of the World in his presence. He made annual appeals and requests for readmission to state conferences and state and federal executives between 1922 and 1928, but was unsuccessful on each occasion. In 1925 he unsuccessfully contested that year's state election as an Industrial Labor candidate against the endorsed Labor candidate, which resulted in his expulsion from the Trades Hall Council. He also contested the 1928 state election as an Independent Labor candidate in light of the continual refusal of his requests for readmission and polled well, but was again defeated. He was eventually readmitted to the party in December 1928, although on the basis that he did not have continuity of membership, preventing him from standing for party endorsement in the immediate future. In 1930, he was elected president of the Denison branch of the Labor Party.

== In state and federal parliament ==
In 1931 he was elected to the Tasmanian House of Assembly as a Labor member for Denison. He was particularly outspoken about issues relating to the unemployed and destitute in his time in state parliament. He lost his seat at the 1934 state election.

Four months after his state defeat, he contested and narrowly won the federal seat of Denison at the 1934 federal election, defeating United Australia Party MP Arthur Beck. He immediately announced that he would stand "four-square behind" leader James Scullin in a party still dealing with the aftermath of the 1931 Labor split. He was re-elected in 1937. Mahoney was defeated by UAP candidate Arthur Beck in 1940.

== Later career ==
He returned to his old role as secretary of the Painters' Union after his election defeat. He was appointed to the public service role of Tasmanian rehabilitation employment officer for returned soldiers c. early 1943, which met with strong protests from the Returned and Services League. He sought preselection to recontest his old seat at the 1943 federal election, but the state executive refused to endorse his candidacy. In May 1943, Mahoney announced that he would contest the seat anyway, declared the preselection decision "the greatest outrage ever committed by a Labor executive on any man in the Labor movement" and stated that he "accept[ed] it as an expulsion from the party. He cited "shocking victimisation" in his decision to run as an independent Labor candidate. He lost to the endorsed candidate, and in congratulating the victor, said he had been "weighted out" from the start. Mahoney sought readmittance to the Labor Party in March 1944 following his automatic removal for opposing an endorsed candidate, but was instead formally expelled. He applied again and was readmitted by the state conference in 1945.

In 1950, Mahoney supported the proposed banning of the Communist Party of Australia at the Labor Party conference, declaring that Robert Menzies "should 'do the job'" and described communism as a "bogey brought about by the Menzies Government to crucify the trade union movement". Later that month, he was appointed president of the Building Trades Federation. He also remained secretary of the Operative Painters and Decorators Union until at least 1954.

Mahoney died in Hobart in September 1955.

Parliament of Australia
Preceded by Arthur Hutchin	Member for Denison; 1934–1940	Succeeded by Arthur Beck
