= Arthur Hutchin =

Australian businessman, politician and army officer

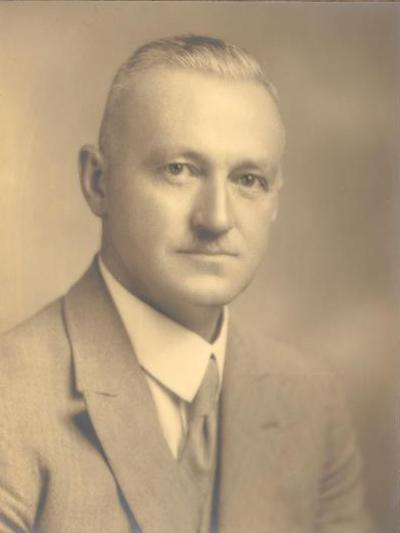

Member of the Australian Parliament for Denison
- In office 19 December 1931 – 15 September 1934
- Preceded by: Charles Culley
- Succeeded by: Gerald Mahoney

Personal details
- Born: 3 March 1887 Bathurst, New South Wales
- Died: 12 June 1965 (aged 78)
- Party: United Australia Party
- Occupation: Company manager

Military service
- Allegiance: Australia
- Branch/service: Australian Army
- Years of service: 1910–1920
- Rank: Major
- Battles/wars: First World War
- Awards: Distinguished Service Order; Mentioned in Despatches

Arthur William Hutchin, DSO (3 March 1887 – 12 June 1965) was an Australian businessman, politician, and army officer. He was a United Australia Party member of the Australian House of Representatives from 1931 to 1934, representing the Tasmanian electorate of Denison.

Hutchin was born in Bathurst, New South Wales, and educated in that state. He joined the military in 1910, having previously served in the militia, and during World War I served with the Australian Imperial Force in France as a company commander and later brigade major. He was appointed to the personal staff of General Sir William Birdwood at the end of the war, before attending the Imperial Staff College and returning to Australia as Inspector of Imperial Training under Inspector-General Sir Harry Chauvel. He resigned that role in May 1920 to take on a senior role with the Electrolytic Zinc Company in Tasmania, remaining with the firm until his election to parliament. He first became involved in politics in early 1931 as president of the Hobart branch of the All for Australia League.

In 1931, he was elected to the Australian House of Representatives as the United Australia Party member for the Tasmanian seat of Denison, defeating sitting Labor MP Charles Culley. He was defeated by Labor candidate Gerald Mahoney in 1934 and left politics, becoming a businessman and industrial consultant. He was general manager of Tattersalls from 1938 to 1954, in which he oversaw the business's move to Melbourne.

Hutchin died in 1965.

Parliament of Australia
Preceded by Charles Culley	Member for Denison; 1931–1934	Succeeded by Gerald Mahoney
