= Adrian Gibson =

Australian politician

Adrian Gibson OAM
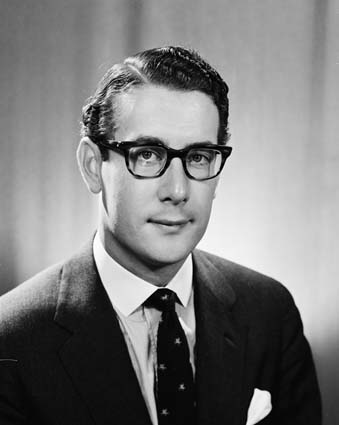

Member of the Australian Parliament for Denison
- In office 15 February 1964 – 29 September 1969
- Preceded by: Athol Townley
- Succeeded by: Robert Solomon

Personal details
- Born: 3 November 1935 Hobart, Tasmania
- Died: 30 April 2015 (aged 79) Victoria, Australia
- Party: Liberal Party of Australia
- Spouse: Diana Knox (m. 1965; div. 1989)
- Education: University of Tasmania
- Occupation: Barrister

Adrian Gibson OAM (3 November 1935 – 30 April 2015) was an Australian lawyer, politician and businessman. He was a member of the House of Representatives from 1964 to 1969, representing the Tasmanian seat of Denison for the Liberal Party.

== Early life ==
Gibson was born on 3 November 1935 in Hobart, Tasmania. His father Sir Marcus Gibson was a barrister who was appointed to the Supreme Court of Tasmania in 1951.

Gibson graduated Bachelor of Laws from the University of Tasmania and later undertook further legal training in England, where he was called to the bar of the Inner Temple. He subsequently returned to Hobart and established a private practice as a barrister.

== Politics ==
Gibson was president of the Liberal Party's Dynnyrne branch and a member of the state executive. In January 1964, he won Liberal preselection to contest the 1964 Denison by-election to the House of Representatives, caused by the death of the incumbent Liberal Party MP Athol Townley. He retained the seat of Denison at the by-election.

In parliament, Gibson served on the House Standing Committee on Privileges from 1964 to 1966 and was a parliamentary nominee to the Australian National University council in 1967. He was re-elected at the 1966 federal election, but in April 1968 announced he would retire from politics for "personal reasons". His term concluded before the 1969 election.

== Later activities ==
Gibson was chairman of Clifton Brick Holdings Ltd, a large brickmaking firm associated with his wife's family. It was sold to Brick and Pipe Ltd in 1987, netting his wife's family proceeds of $40 million. He was also chairman of their Melbourne-based family office, Investors Pty Ltd.

Gibson was a member of the Melbourne Club and the Tasmanian Club. He was appointed chairman of the Australian National Memorial Theatre (owner of Melbourne's National Theatre) in 1978 and was elected to the council of the Institute of Public Affairs in 1981.

== Personal life ==
In 1965, Gibson married Diana Knox, the 20-year-old granddaughter and heiress of businessman William Angliss. They had three children before divorcing in 1989. The following year, the Australian Financial Review estimated their combined net worth at $100 million and they were included in the BRW Rich 200.

Gibson was awarded the Medal of the Order of Australia (OAM) in the 2014 Australia Day Honours, for "service to the arts, to agriculture, and to the Parliament of Australia". He died on 30 April 2015, aged 79.

Parliament of Australia
Preceded by Athol Townley	Member for Denison; 1964–1969	Succeeded by Robert Solomon
