= William Laird Smith =

Australian politician

The Honourable William Laird Smith
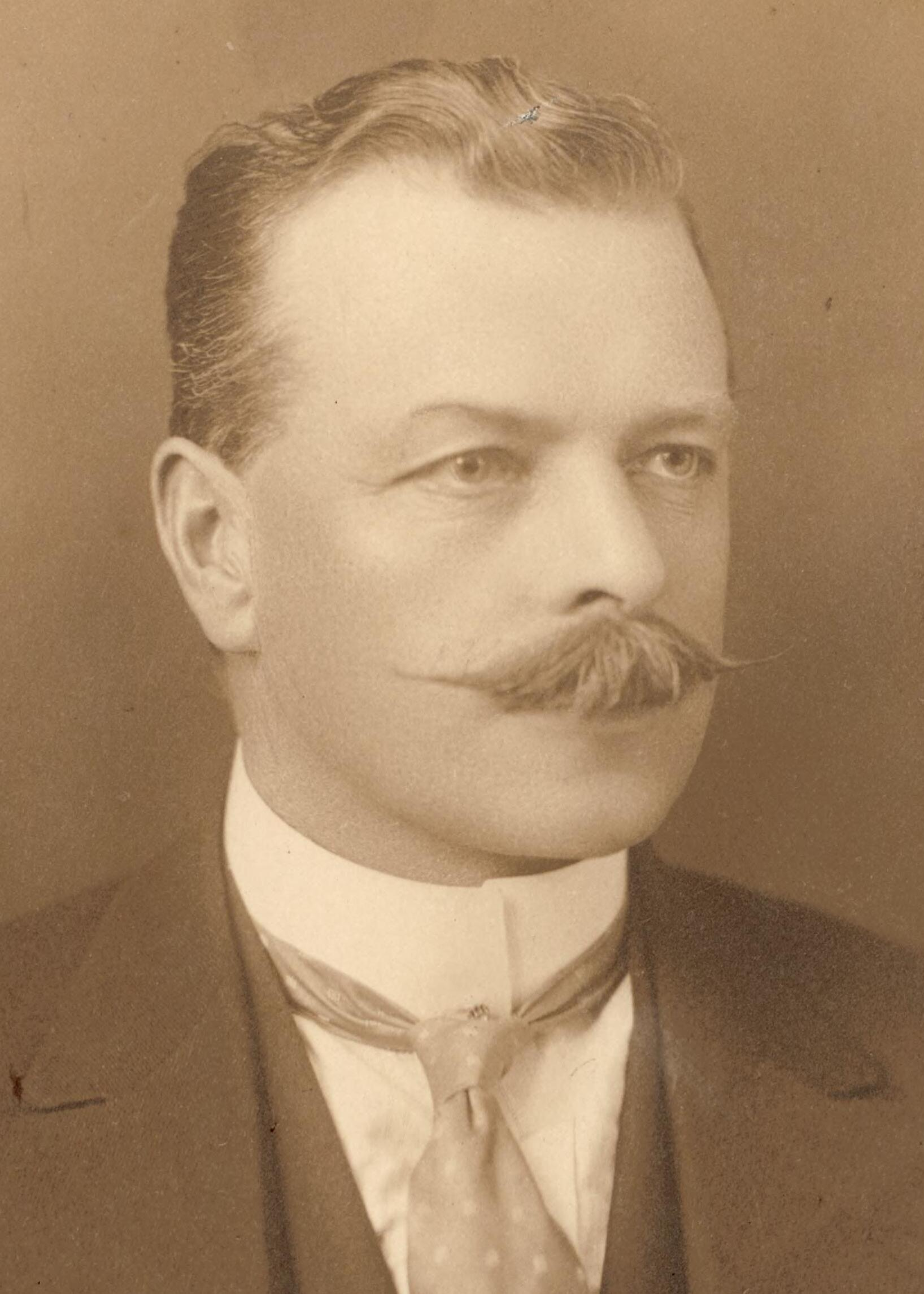

Minister for the Navy
- In office 28 July 1920 – 21 December 1921
- Preceded by: Joseph Cook
- Succeeded by: (abolished)

Member of the Australian Parliament for Denison
- In office 13 April 1910 – 16 December 1922
- Preceded by: Philip Fysh
- Succeeded by: David O'Keefe

Personal details
- Born: 15 September 1869 Westbury, Tasmania, Australia
- Died: 21 October 1942 (aged 73) Burnie, Tasmania, Australia
- Party: Labor (1910–17, 1938–1942); Nationalist (1917–22); Social Credit (c. 1934)
- Spouse: Mabel Ellen Russell
- Occupation: Electrician

William Henry Laird Smith (15 September 1869 – 21 October 1942) was an Australian politician who served in the House of Representatives from 1910 to 1922. He was Minister for the Navy in the Hughes government from 1920 to 1921.

== Early life ==
Smith was born on 15 September 1869 in Westbury, Tasmania. He was one of six children born to Elizabeth (née Laird) and John Smith; his father worked as a wheelwright and telegraph contractor. He was educated at state schools in Victoria and Tasmania, before qualifying as an electrician with a firm in Devonport. Smith worked as an assistant overseer with Tasmanian Government Railways and later as an indoor machinist. He was an official in the Amalgamated Engineering Union and joined the Workers' Political League in Hobart in 1907, becoming a branch president in 1909.

== Politics ==
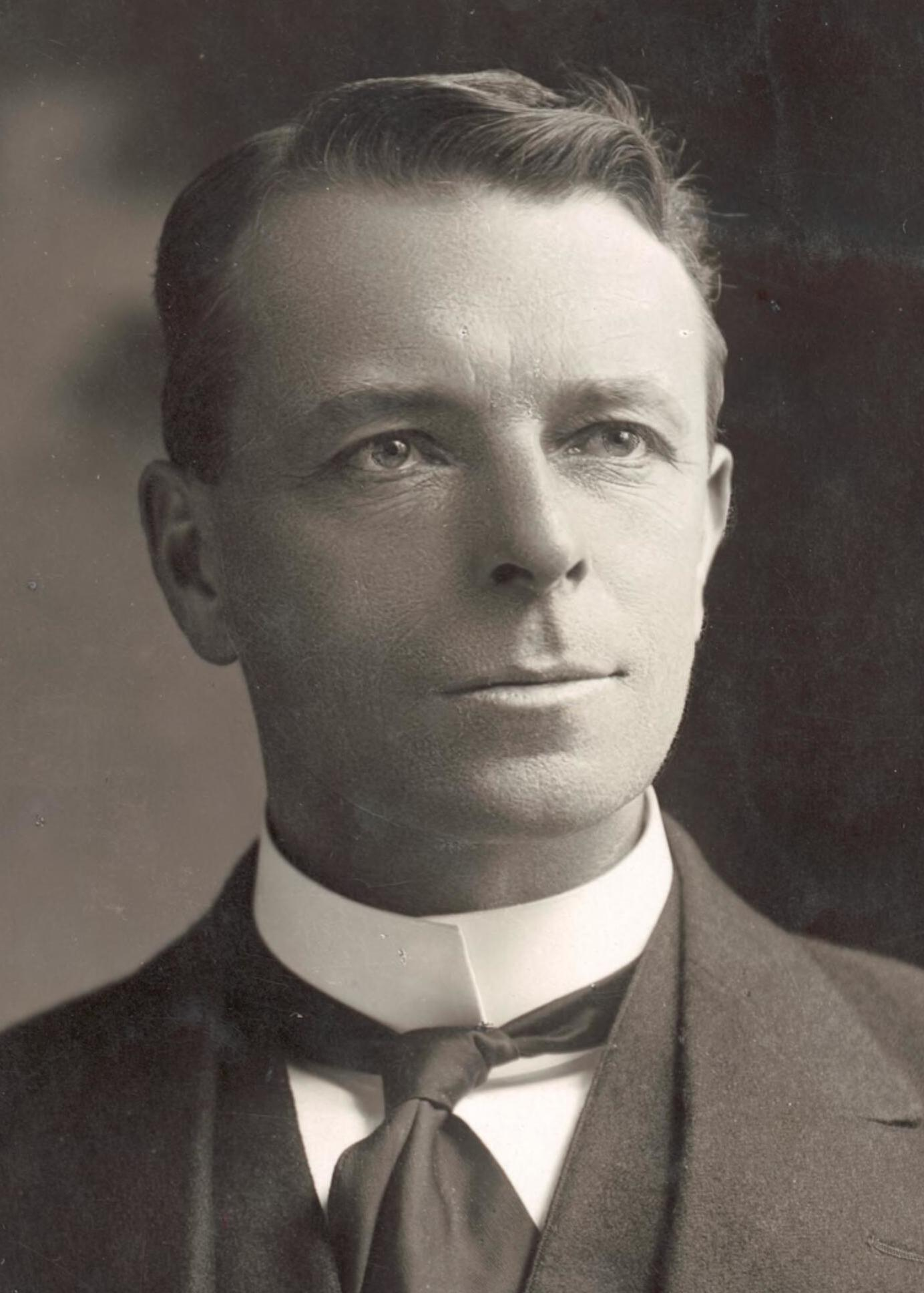
Undated photo

Smith was elected as the Australian Labor Party member for the Australian House of Representatives seat of Denison at the 1910 election. In December 1915, he married Mabel Ellen Russell—they had no children. He was an Assistant Minister during the Second Hughes Ministry from 14 November 1916 to 17 February 1917. He was a strong supporter of Prime Minister Billy Hughes and campaigned for conscription at the October 1916 plebiscite. Smith left the Labor Party with Hughes in the 1916 Labor split and joined the Nationalist Party when it was established.

In the Fifth Hughes Ministry he was an Honorary Minister from 4 February 1920 until he was made Minister for the Navy on 28 July 1920. He was Minister for the Navy until 21 December 1921. Owing to the end of the war, he was obliged to carry out a significant reduction in the capacity of the Royal Australian Navy. The position of naval minister was abolished in December 1921, with responsibilities transferred to the Minister for Defence, and Smith was not reappointed to the ministry. At the 1922 election, he was opposed by Labor and two other independent Nationalist candidates, losing to Labor's David O'Keefe.

== Later life ==
Smith moved to Burnie and married his second wife Hermione Elsie Boldt in 1922. He eventually became a farmer. At the 1934 election, he ran against Prime Minister Joseph Lyons as a supporter of social credit. In March 1938 he successfully applied for re-entry to the Labor Party.

Smith died suddenly on 21 October 1942, aged 73, while attending an ALP meeting at the Burnie Town Hall. The meeting was held in honour of ALP minister Eddie Ward and was also attended by Senator Bill Aylett. Smith moved a motion of thanks to Ward, but while Aylett was seconding the motion Smith had a sudden seizure and died on the platform within ten minutes.

Political offices
Preceded by Joseph Cook	Minister for the Navy; 1920–1921	Abolished
Parliament of Australia
Preceded by Philip Fysh	Member for Denison; 1910–1922	Succeeded by David O'Keefe
