= Michael Hodgman =

Australian politician (1938–2013)

The Honourable Michael Hodgman AM QC
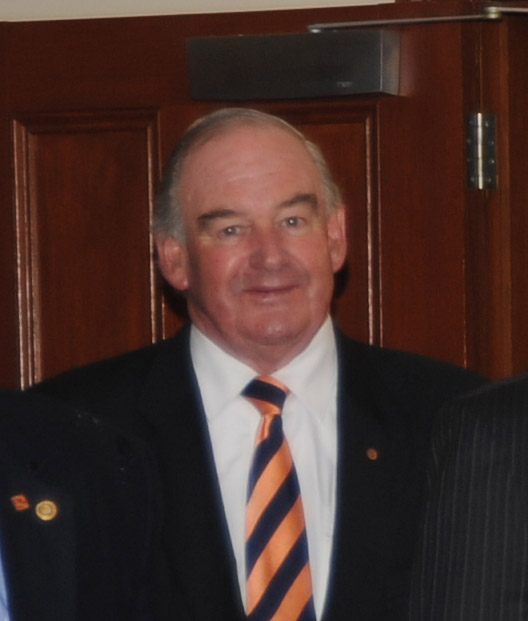

Minister for the Capital Territory
- In office 3 November 1980 – 11 March 1983
- Prime Minister: Malcolm Fraser
- Preceded by: Bob Ellicott
- Succeeded by: Tom Uren (Territories and Local Government)

Member of the Australian Parliament for Denison
- In office 13 December 1975 – 11 July 1987
- Preceded by: John Coates
- Succeeded by: Duncan Kerr

Member of the Tasmanian House of Assembly for Denison
- In office 21 August 2001 – 20 March 2010
- Preceded by: Ray Groom
- Succeeded by: Elise Archer
- In office 1 February 1992 – 29 August 1998
- Preceded by: Chris Gibson
- Succeeded by: Seat abolished

Member of the Tasmanian House of Assembly for Huon
- In office 14 May 1966 – 25 May 1974
- Preceded by: Ron Brown
- Succeeded by: Peter Hodgman

Personal details
- Born: William Michael Hodgman; 16 November 1938 Hobart, Tasmania, Australia
- Died: 19 June 2013 (aged 74) Hobart, Tasmania, Australia
- Party: Liberal
- Spouse: Marian Hodgman
- Relations: Bill Hodgman (father); Peter Hodgman (brother)
- Children: Angela, Victoria and Will Hodgman
- Education: University of Tasmania
- Occupation: Politician, lawyer

William Michael Hodgman AM QC (16 November 1938 – 19 June 2013) was an Australian politician and lawyer. He was a member of the Liberal Party and served as Minister for the Capital Territory in the Fraser government from 1980 to 1983. He was active in both state and federal politics, serving in the Tasmanian Legislative Council (1966–1974), Australian House of Representatives (1975–1987), and Tasmanian House of Assembly (1992–1998, 2002–2010). His son, Will Hodgman, was Premier of Tasmania for six years, until his resignation in January 2020.

== Early career and education ==
Michael Hodgman was born at Hobart, Tasmania, in 1938. He was educated at The Hutchins School and the University of Tasmania, where he graduated with a Bachelor of Laws degree in 1962. Whilst at university, Hodgman served as vice president of the Tasmania University Law Society and editor of the university newspaper Togatus.

== Legal career ==
After graduation, Hodgman was admitted to the Bar of the Supreme Court of Tasmania and served as associate to the Rt Hon. Sir Victor Windeyer of the High Court of Australia from 1962 to 1963. He then worked as a Legal Officer for Hydro Tasmania from 1965 to 1966. He was a committee member of the Tasmanian Bar Council from 1969 to 1974, including a period as vice president from 1972 to 1973. He was appointed Queen's Counsel in 1984.

Throughout his career, Hodgman largely specialised in criminal law, and represented a number of high-profile clients, including Mark "Chopper" Read.

== Parliamentary career ==
Hodgman first entered politics in 1966 as member for the Tasmanian Legislative Council seat of Huon. He held this position until 1974 when he stood down to run for the Federal electorate of Denison. He was unsuccessful, but won the seat at his second attempt at the 1975 election, and held the seat until 1987, when he was defeated by Duncan Kerr from the Australian Labor Party. He served as Minister for the Capital Territory and Minister Assisting the Minister for Industry and Commerce in the Fraser government from 1980 to 1983.

In 1992 Hodgman returned to state politics in the lower house electorate of Denison, which he held until defeated in 1998, when the size of parliament was reduced from 35 to 25 members. He regained the position in 2001 after a recount of votes due to the retirement of Ray Groom. In the 2002 state election he retained his seat, at the expense of his colleague and leader Bob Cheek.

Hodgman was well known for his strong support for retaining Australia's Constitutional monarchy. He enjoyed wide name-recognition in Hobart; mainly due to his long political career. His wife died in 2003. His son, Will Hodgman, was elected to the House of Assembly in 2002 from the neighbouring seat of Franklin, and was Premier of Tasmania from 2014 to 2020.

After Michael's final election to the House of Assembly in 2006, he was in the partyroom meeting that saw Will elected unopposed as the new Liberal leader.

He achieved further fame in 2007 when, during a speech, he rallied fellow party members to give "the Labor party one right up the bracket". On the popular Get This radio show, the team had a featured segment using the soundbite "one right up the bracket", in which callers air their grievances.

On 19 November 2009 Hodgman announced he would not be contesting the 2010 state election. In his farewell speech he spoke briefly about his political career including electorates represented, ministerial offices held, opposition to the invasion of East Timor and flooding of Lake Pedder.

== Death ==
He died in a nursing home in Hobart in 2013. He had terminal emphysema and Alzheimer's disease.

== Honours and awards ==
Member of the Order of Australia (AM)	June 2012
Queen Elizabeth II Silver Jubilee Medal	1977
Australian Defence Medal	
Anniversary of National Service 1951–1972 Medal	

== See also ==
- Fourth Fraser Ministry
- Hodgman family

Tasmanian Legislative Council
Preceded by Ron Brown	Member for Huon; 1966–1974	Succeeded by Peter Hodgman
Parliament of Australia
Preceded by John Coates	Member for Denison; 1975–1987	Succeeded by Duncan Kerr
Political offices
Preceded by Bob Ellicott	Minister for the Capital Territory; 1980–1983	Succeeded by Tom Uren
