= John Coates (politician) =

Australian retired politician

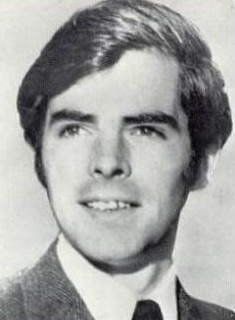

Senator for Tasmania
- In office 1 July 1981 – 20 August 1996
- Succeeded by: Kerry O'Brien

Member of the Australian Parliament for Denison
- In office 2 December 1972 – 13 December 1975
- Preceded by: Robert Solomon
- Succeeded by: Michael Hodgman

Personal details
- Born: 23 March 1944 (age 82) Melbourne, Victoria
- Party: Australian Labor Party
- Education: University of Sydney
- Occupation: Biochemist

John Coates (born 23 March 1944) is an Australian retired politician. Born in Melbourne, he was educated at the University of Sydney, after which he became a biochemist at the University of Tasmania. In 1972, he was elected to the Australian House of Representatives as the Labor member for Denison, defeating sitting Liberal MP Robert Solomon. He was defeated by Liberal candidate Michael Hodgman in 1975, but in 1980 returned to politics when he was elected to the Senate. He remained a Senator until he resigned his place on 20 August 1996, six months after the federal election that had removed Labor from power.

Coates announced his resignation from the Senate on 20 August 1996, the same day that his ALP colleague Senator Mal Colston left the party and with Coalition support was elected Deputy President of the Senate. Senator Coates announced his resignation in the Senate just shortly after Colston's election as Deputy Senate President and when Senator Coates made this announcement there was an interjection from across the chamber from Liberal Senator Alan Ferguson. In reference to the Colston defection earlier in the day, Senator Ferguson in response to Senator Coates' announcement said "Another one." Whilst still in the middle of making his resignation speech, Senator Coates responded in kind by saying, "From the Senate not from the Australian Labor Party."

Parliament of Australia
Preceded by Robert Solomon	Member for Denison; 1972 – 1975	Succeeded by Michael Hodgman
