= Division of Denison =

Former Australian federal electoral division

Coordinates: 42.888°S 147.244°E

Denison Australian House of Representatives Division
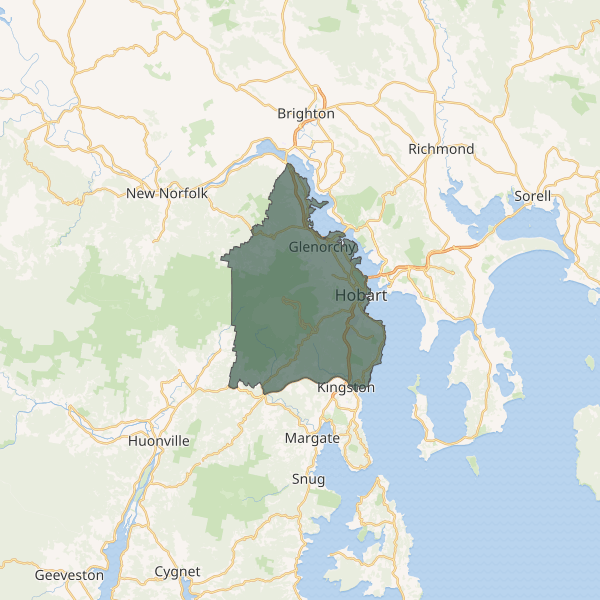
- Division of Denison in Tasmania, as of the 2016 federal election
- Created: 1903
- Abolished: 2019
- Namesake: Sir William Denison
- Electors: 74,963 (2016)
- Area: 288 km^{2} (111.2 sq mi)
- Demographic: Inner metropolitan

The Division of Denison was an Australian electoral division in Tasmania, before being replaced by the Division of Clark as part of a 2016–17 redistribution.

== Geography ==
Prior to 1903, the entire state of Tasmania was covered by a single Division of Tasmania. In 1903, the division was split into five divisions, with one of them being Denison.

The division was located in central Hobart on the western shore of the River Derwent. As at the 2016 election (the last election before being replaced by Clark), it incorporated the area covered by the Cities of Hobart and Glenorchy, together with the northern parts of Kingborough Council, including Taroona, generally north of the Huon Highway. kunanyi / Mount Wellington was a prominent physical feature in the division's west.

== History ==
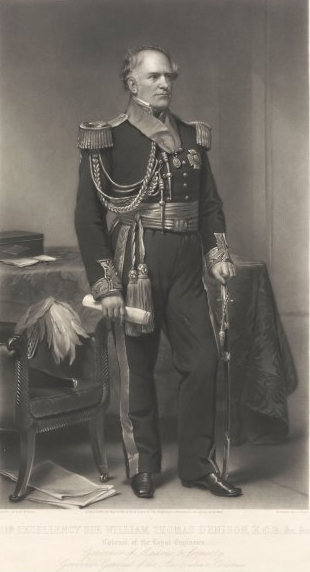
Sir William Denison, the division's namesake

The division was one of the five established when the former Division of Tasmania was redistributed on 2 October 1903 and was named for Sir William Denison, who was Lieutenant Governor of Van Diemen's Land 1847–55. Denison was a consistently marginal seat, but was held by the Australian Labor Party between 1987 and 2010 with little difficulty. Its most prominent members were Sir Philip Fysh, a member of the first federal Cabinet; Athol Townley, Minister for Defence in the Menzies Government; and Duncan Kerr, a minister in the Keating, Rudd and Gillard governments. Townley resigned in 1964 when he was named Ambassador to the United States, but he died before taking up the appointment. Another prominent member was independent MP Andrew Wilkie, elected at the 2010 election.

At the time of cessation, Denison had 16 different member, the second highest at the time (together with Bendigo and Swan, and after Bass's 17) of any federal electorate.

== Members ==
Image	Member	Party	Term	Notes
	Sir Philip Fysh (1835–1919)	Protectionist	16 December 1903 – 1906	Previously held the Division of Tasmania. Served as minister under Deakin. Retired
	Sir Philip Fysh (1835–1919)	Anti-Socialist	1906 – 26 May 1909	Previously held the Division of Tasmania. Served as minister under Deakin. Retired
	Sir Philip Fysh (1835–1919)	Liberal	26 May 1909 – 19 February 1910	Previously held the Division of Tasmania. Served as minister under Deakin. Retired
	William Laird Smith (1869–1942)	Labor	13 April 1910 – 14 November 1916	Served as minister under Hughes. Lost seat
	William Laird Smith (1869–1942)	National Labor	14 November 1916 – 17 February 1917	Served as minister under Hughes. Lost seat
	William Laird Smith (1869–1942)	Nationalist	17 February 1917 – 16 December 1922	Served as minister under Hughes. Lost seat
	David O'Keefe (1864–1943)	Labor	16 December 1922 – 14 November 1925	Previously a member of the Senate. Lost seat. Later elected to the Tasmanian House of Assembly seat of Wilmot in 1934
	Sir John Gellibrand (1872–1945)	Nationalist	14 November 1925 – 17 November 1928	Lost seat
	Charles Culley (1877–1949)	Labor	17 November 1928 – 19 December 1931	Previously held the Tasmanian House of Assembly seat of Denison. Served as minister under Scullin. Lost seat. Later elected to the Tasmanian House of Assembly seat of Denison in 1934
	Arthur Hutchin (1887–1965)	United Australia	19 December 1931 – 15 September 1934	Lost seat
	Gerald Mahoney (1892–1955)	Labor	15 September 1934 – 21 September 1940	Previously held the Tasmanian House of Assembly seat of Denison. Lost seat
	Arthur Beck (1892–1965)	United Australia	21 September 1940 – 21 August 1943	Lost seat
	Frank Gaha (1894–1966)	Labor	21 August 1943 – 31 October 1949	Previously a member of the Tasmanian Legislative Council. Retired. Later elected to the Tasmanian House of Assembly seat of Denison in 1950
	Athol Townley (1905–1963)	Liberal	10 December 1949 – 24 December 1963	Served as minister under Menzies. Died in office
	Adrian Gibson (1935–2015)	Liberal	15 February 1964 – 29 September 1969	Retired
	Robert Solomon (1931–2024)	Liberal	25 October 1969 – 2 December 1972	Lost seat
	John Coates (1944–)	Labor	2 December 1972 – 13 December 1975	Lost seat. Later elected to the Senate in 1980
	Michael Hodgman (1938–2013)	Liberal	13 December 1975 – 11 July 1987	Previously a member of the Tasmanian Legislative Council. Served as minister under Fraser. Lost seat. Later elected to the Tasmanian House of Assembly seat of Denison in 1992
	Duncan Kerr (1952–)	Labor	11 July 1987 – 19 July 2010	Served as minister under Keating. Retired
	Andrew Wilkie (1961–)	Independent	21 August 2010 – 11 April 2019	Transferred to the Division of Clark after Denison was abolished in 2019

== Election results ==
2016 Australian federal election: Denison
Party	Candidate	Votes	%	±%
Independent	Andrew Wilkie	29,372	44.07	+5.99
Labor	Jane Austin	15,335	23.01	−1.74
Liberal	Marcus Allan	13,267	19.90	−3.33
Greens	Jen Brown	7,068	10.60	+2.68
Christian Democrats	Amanda Excell	980	1.47	+1.47
Democratic Labour	Wayne Williams	632	0.95	+0.10
Total formal votes		66,654	97.08	+1.30
Informal votes		2,002	2.92	−1.30
Turnout		68,656	92.82	−1.44
Notional two-party-preferred count
Labor	Jane Austin	43,550	65.34	+6.43
Liberal	Marcus Allan	23,104	34.66	−6.43
Two-candidate-preferred result
Independent	Andrew Wilkie	45,176	67.78	+2.27
Labor	Jane Austin	21,478	32.22	−2.27
Independent hold		Swing	+2.27	
