= Robert Solomon (politician) =

Australian politician

Dr Robert Solomon AM
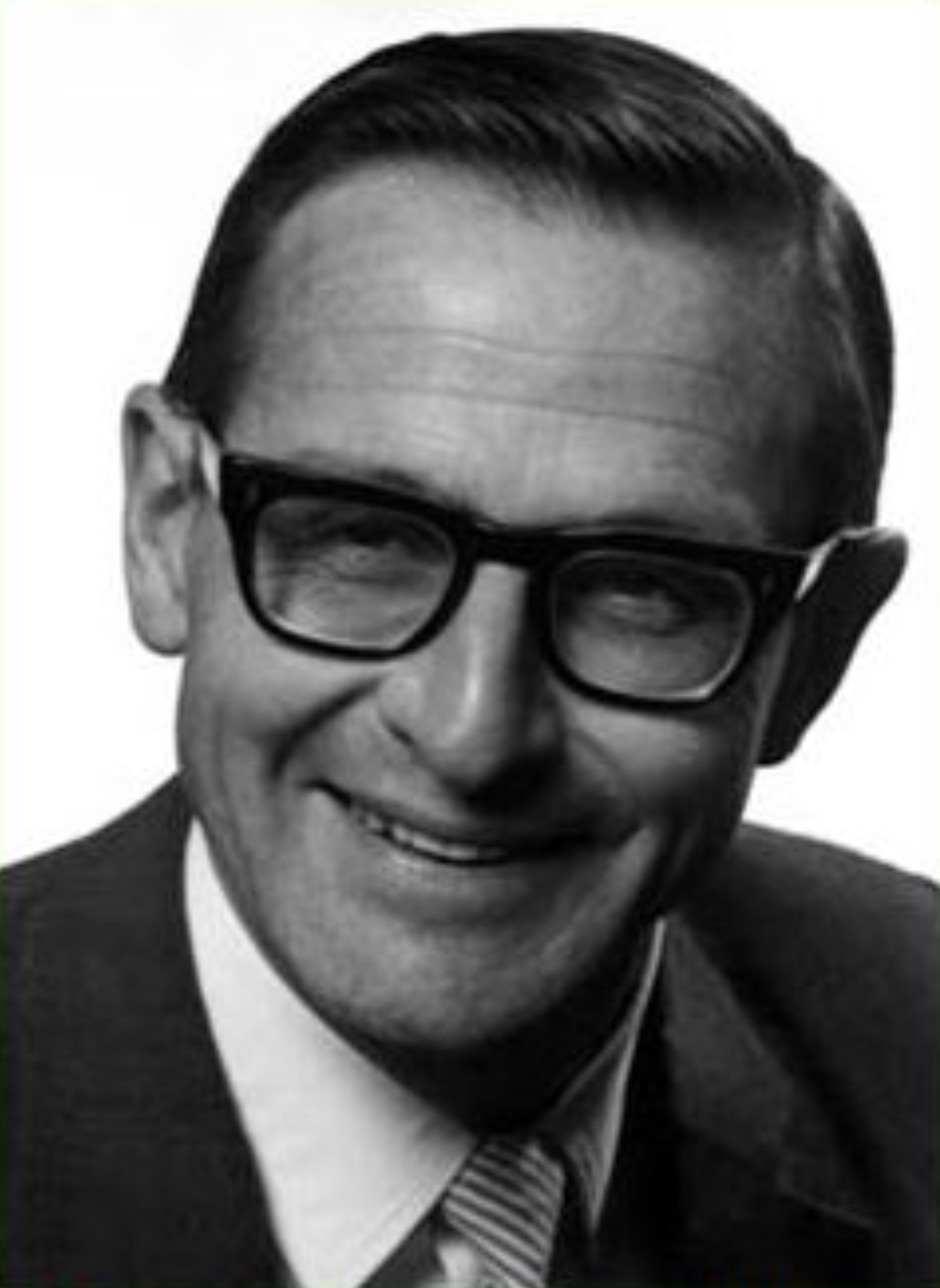

Member of the Australian Parliament for Denison
- In office 25 October 1969 – 2 December 1972
- Preceded by: Adrian Gibson
- Succeeded by: John Coates

Personal details
- Born: 2 November 1931 Condobolin, New South Wales, Australia
- Died: 14 June 2024 (aged 92)
- Party: Liberal
- Education: University of Sydney; Oxford University; University of Tasmania
- Occupation: Geography lecturer

Robert John Solomon AM (2 November 1931 – 14 June 2024) was an Australian academic and politician. He was a Rhodes Scholar and lectured in geography at the University of Tasmania before his election to parliament at the 1969 federal election. He represented the Division of Denison as a Liberal until his defeat in 1972 after a single term. After leaving parliament he was prominent in urban development circles.

== Early life ==
Solomon was born on 2 November 1931 in Condobolin, New South Wales. He was the son of Robert Stanley Solomon and Gwendolyn née Say, and a relative of Samuel Moss Solomon. He completed his secondary schooling at Barker College, Sydney, where he was a state champion in junior athletics. He held the degrees of Bachelor of Arts (University of Sydney), Master of Arts (University of Oxford), and Doctor of Philosophy (University of Tasmania), as well as diplomas in education (University of Sydney) and law (University of New South Wales). He was the New South Wales Rhodes Scholar for 1955.

Solomon was a senior lecturer in geography at the University of Tasmania from 1957 to 1969.

== Politics ==
Solomon was a vice-president of the Liberal Party of Australia (Tasmanian Division) from 1965 to 1969. He was elected to parliament at the 1969 federal election, retaining the Division of Denison for the Liberal Party following the retirement of Adrian Gibson. He was defeated by the Australian Labor Party (ALP) candidate John Coates at the 1972 election.

In 1973 Solomon was one of 32 candidates for Liberal preselection in the Sydney seat of Bradfield.

== Later career ==
After losing his seat in parliament, Solomon advertised for work in The Sydney Morning Herald. He qualified as a barrister, also serving as managing director of an urban research consultancy and as executive director of the Advertising Federation of Australia.

Solomon had a long involvement with the Australian Institute of Urban Studies (AIUS), serving as chairman of the New South Wales division and twice as national chairman. He published his doctoral thesis in 1976 under the title Urbanisation: The Evolution of an Australian Capital, and later published a history of Broken Hill, New South Wales. In 1987 he was appointed director of development at the University of New South Wales. He was responsible for co-ordinating fundraising efforts.

Solomon was appointed a Member of the Order of Australia (AM) in the 2010 Queen's Birthday Honours, "for service to urban affairs, particularly through research, public discussion and policy development by the Australian Institute of Urban Studies, to the Association of Former Members of Parliament, and to athletics."

== Death ==
Solomon died on 14 June 2024.

== Selected works ==
- Solomon, R. J. (1988). The Richest Lode : Broken Hill 1883 – 1988. Sydney, Australia: Hale & Iremonger. ISBN 9780868063331.

Parliament of Australia
Preceded by Adrian Gibson	Member for Denison; 1969–1972	Succeeded by John Coates
