= Athol Townley =

Australian politician

The Honourable Athol Townley
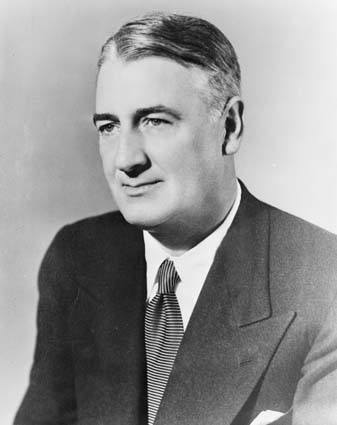

Minister for Defence
- In office 10 December 1958 – 18 December 1963
- Preceded by: Philip McBride
- Succeeded by: Paul Hasluck

Minister for Supply
- In office 11 February 1958 – 10 December 1958
- Preceded by: Howard Beale
- Succeeded by: Alan Hulme

Minister for Immigration
- In office 24 October 1956 – 19 March 1958
- Preceded by: Harold Holt
- Succeeded by: Alick Downer

Minister for Air
- In office 9 July 1954 – 24 October 1956
- Preceded by: William McMahon (Air); Larry Anthony (Aviation)
- Succeeded by: Frederick Osborne (Air); Shane Paltridge (Aviation)

Minister for Social Services
- In office 11 May 1951 – 9 July 1954
- Preceded by: Bill Spooner
- Succeeded by: William McMahon

Member of the Australian Parliament for Denison
- In office 10 December 1949 – 24 December 1963
- Preceded by: Frank Gaha
- Succeeded by: Adrian Gibson

Personal details
- Born: Athol Gordon Townley; 3 October 1905 Hobart, Tasmania, Australia
- Died: 24 December 1963 (aged 58) East Melbourne, Victoria, Australia
- Party: Liberal
- Spouse: Hazel Florence Greenwood
- Relations: Rex Townley (brother)
- Occupation: Chemist

Athol Gordon Townley (3 October 1905 – 24 December 1963) was an Australian politician who served in the House of Representatives from 1949 until his death in 1963. A member of the Liberal Party, he served as a minister in the Menzies Government from 1951 to 1963, notably as Minister for Defence from 1958.

== Early life ==
Townley was born on 3 October 1905 in Hobart, Tasmania. He was the fourth child born to Susan (née Bickford) and Reginald George Townley. His older brother Rex was a member of the Tasmanian parliament.

Townley's father died in 1906 and the family subsequently moved in with his mother's sister Rebecca Sidwell. He attended Elizabeth Street State School, Hobart High School and Hobart Technical College. He qualified as a pharmaceutical chemist in 1928, serving an apprenticeship with Ash, Sidwell & Co., his uncle's firm. Townley and his brother Rex moved to Sydney during the Great Depression, where he found in the quality control department of industrial baker Gartrell White Ltd. The brothers later moved back to Hobart and went into partnership as chemists under the name Sidwell & Townley. They owned three pharmacies, with the largest situated opposite the General Post Office, Hobart.

== Military service ==
Townley joined the Royal Australian Navy in September 1940, and in February 1941, he was sent to England to train in bomb- and mine-disposal work. He returned to Australia and commanded the 35 ton patrol boat HMAS Steady Hour, which assisted in destroying a Japanese midget submarine during the attack on Sydney Harbour in June 1942. He was put in command of the Fairmile B motor launch ML817 in January 1943, promoted to acting lieutenant commander in March and was involved in the New Guinea campaign.

== Political career ==
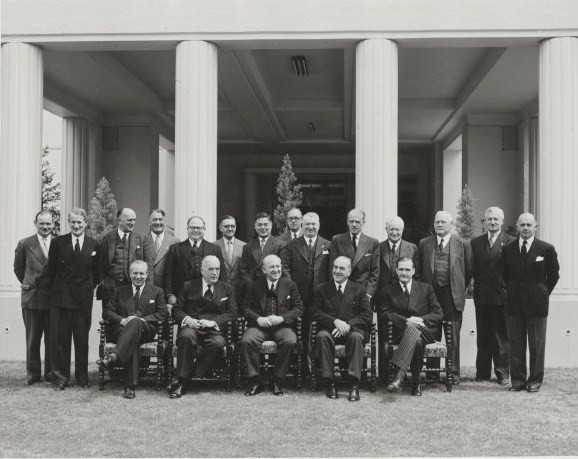
Townley is fourth from left in standing row of the Menzies Government, 1951

Townley was opposed to Ben Chifley's bank nationalisation and won the Australian House of Representatives seat of Denison in the 1949 election for the Liberal Party of Australia. Robert Menzies valued his opinion and appointed him to a series of portfolios, starting with Social Services in May 1951, although Paul Hasluck considered Townley a "teacher's pet" and claimed that he had only "slight" administrative abilities. Menzies appointed Townley Minister for Air and Minister for Civil Aviation in July 1954, Minister for Immigration in October 1956, and Minister for Supply in February 1958.

Townley supported Australia having Nuclear weapons: when in 1956 when Townley, wrote to Philip McBride, Minister for Defence, recommending the acquisition of tactical nuclear weapons to arm Australia's English Electric Canberra bombers and CAC Sabre fighters.

Townley became Minister for Defence in December 1958. On 24 May 1962 he announced that Australia would be sending thirty army advisers to South Vietnam, committing Australia to the Vietnam War. He suffered ill health during the 1960s, including a heart attack and bouts of pneumonia. Nevertheless, he travelled to Washington in October 1963 to sign a contract for the purchase of the F-111 aircraft—this contract was later severely criticised due to the sharply increased prices subsequently experienced.

== Death ==
Townley left the ministry after the 1963 election, and on 17 December it was announced that he would succeed Howard Beale as Australian Ambassador to the United States. However, on 13 December he had collapsed in his Melbourne office and been taken to the Mercy Hospital in East Melbourne. In the preceding year he had suffered a heart ailment and pneumonia. Townley died on Christmas Eve 1963, aged 58. His state funeral in Hobart was attended by Governor-General Lord De L'Isle, Governor of Tasmania Charles Gairdner, Prime Minister Robert Menzies, and Premier of Tasmania Eric Reece, as well as many other dignitaries.

== Personal life ==
In 1931, Townley married Hazel Greenwood, with whom he had one son. He was a member of the Baptist Church and played for the North Hobart Football Club and the New Town Cricket Club.

== See also ==
Political offices
Preceded by Bill Spooner	Minister for Social Services; 1951–54	Succeeded by William McMahon
Preceded by William McMahon	Minister for Air; 1954–56	Succeeded by Frederick Osborne
Preceded by Larry Anthony	Minister for Civil Aviation; 1954–56	Succeeded by Shane Paltridge
Preceded by Harold Holt	Minister for Immigration; 1956–58	Succeeded by Alec Downer
Preceded by Howard Beale	Minister for Supply; 1958	Succeeded by Alan Hulme
Preceded by Philip McBride	Minister for Defence; 1958–63	Succeeded by Paul Hasluck
Parliament of Australia
Preceded by Frank Gaha	Member for Denison; 1949–64	Succeeded by Adrian Gibson
