= Electoral results for the Division of Boothby =

Australian division election results

This is a list of electoral results for the Division of Boothby in Australian federal elections from the division's creation in 1903 until the present.

== Members ==
Member	Party	Term
Lee Batchelor	Labour	1903–1911
David Gordon	Liberal	1911–1913
George Dankel	Labor	1913–1916
George Dankel	National Labor	1916–1917
George Dankel	Nationalist	1917–1917
William Story	Nationalist	1917–1922
Jack Duncan-Hughes	Liberal	1922–1925
Jack Duncan-Hughes	Nationalist	1925–1928
John Price	Labor	1928–1931
John Price	Independent	1931–1931
John Price	United Australia	1931–1941
Grenfell Price	United Australia	1941–1943
Thomas Sheehy	Labor	1943–1949
(Sir) John McLeay Sr.	Liberal	1949–1966
John McLeay Jr.	Liberal	1966–1981
Steele Hall	Liberal	1981–1996
Andrew Southcott	Liberal	1996–2016
Nicolle Flint	Liberal	2016–2022
Louise Miller-Frost	Labor	2022–present

== Election results ==
=== Elections in the 2020s ===
==== 2025 ====
2025 Australian federal election: Boothby
Party	Candidate	Votes	%	±%
Trumpet of Patriots	Nicole Hussey			
Family First	Samuel Prior			
One Nation	Tonya Scott			
Labor	Louise Miller-Frost			
Greens	Joanna Wells			
Liberal	Nicolle Flint			
Total formal votes				
Informal votes				
Turnout				

==== 2022 ====
2022 Australian federal election: Boothby
Party	Candidate	Votes	%	±%
Liberal	Rachel Swift	43,196	37.99	−7.20
Labor	Louise Miller-Frost	36,746	32.32	−2.31
Greens	Jeremy Carter	17,285	15.20	+3.24
Independent	Jo Dyer	7,441	6.54	+6.54
United Australia	Graeme Clark	2,520	2.22	+0.33
One Nation	Bob Couch	2,320	2.04	+2.04
Animal Justice	Frankie Bray	1,358	1.19	−1.23
Liberal Democrats	Aleksandra Nikolic	1,250	1.10	+1.10
Independent	Paul Busuttil	1,048	0.92	+0.92
Federation	Peter Harris	543	0.48	+0.48
Total formal votes		113,707	95.56	+0.26
Informal votes		5,289	4.44	−0.26
Turnout		118,996	92.54	−1.07
Two-party-preferred result
Labor	Louise Miller-Frost	60,579	53.28	+4.66
Liberal	Rachel Swift	53,128	46.72	−4.66
Labor gain from Liberal		Swing	+4.66	

Alluvial diagram for preference flows in the seat of Boothby in the 2022 federal election. indicates at what stage the winning candidate had over 50% of the votes and was declared the winner.

=== Elections in the 2010s ===
==== 2019 ====
2019 Australian federal election: Boothby
Party	Candidate	Votes	%	±%
Liberal	Nicolle Flint	49,973	45.19	+3.50
Labor	Nadia Clancy	38,297	34.63	+7.70
Greens	Stef Rozitis	13,224	11.96	+3.78
Independent	Trevor Jones	2,843	2.57	+2.57
Animal Justice	Geoff Russell	2,675	2.42	+0.99
United Australia	Peter Salerno	2,094	1.89	+1.89
Conservative National	Adrian Cheok	868	0.79	+0.78
Rise Up Australia	Carol Wong	603	0.55	+0.55
Total formal votes		110,577	95.30	−0.55
Informal votes		5,453	4.70	+0.55
Turnout		116,030	93.61	+1.14
Two-party-preferred result
Liberal	Nicolle Flint	56,812	51.38	−1.33
Labor	Nadia Clancy	53,765	48.62	+1.33
Liberal hold		Swing	−1.33	

==== 2016 ====
2016 Australian federal election: Boothby
Party	Candidate	Votes	%	±%
Liberal	Nicolle Flint	39,298	41.24	−9.11
Labor	Mark Ward	23,366	24.52	−6.25
Xenophon	Karen Hockley	19,688	20.66	+20.66
Greens	Jane Bange	8,001	8.40	−3.57
Family First	Gary Wheatcroft	2,477	2.60	−1.31
Animal Justice	Evelyn Carroll	1,356	1.42	+1.42
Independent	Jamie Armfield	664	0.70	+0.70
Independent	Robert De Jonge	438	0.46	+0.46
Total formal votes		95,288	95.61	−0.91
Informal votes		4,374	4.39	+0.91
Turnout		99,662	92.86	−1.06
Two-party-preferred result
Liberal	Nicolle Flint	50,980	53.50	−3.62
Labor	Mark Ward	44,308	46.50	+3.62
Liberal hold		Swing	−3.62	

==== 2013 ====
2013 Australian federal election: Boothby
Party	Candidate	Votes	%	±%
Liberal	Andrew Southcott	47,484	50.35	+6.08
Labor	Annabel Digance	29,018	30.77	−4.81
Greens	Stephen Thomas	11,287	11.97	−1.46
Family First	Natasha Edmonds	3,683	3.91	+1.09
Palmer United	Sally Cox	2,835	3.01	+3.01
Total formal votes		94,307	96.52	+1.24
Informal votes		3,400	3.48	−1.24
Turnout		97,707	93.92	+1.96
Two-party-preferred result
Liberal	Andrew Southcott	53,866	57.12	+6.50
Labor	Annabel Digance	40,441	42.88	−6.50
Liberal hold		Swing	+6.50	

==== 2010 ====
2010 Australian federal election: Boothby
Party	Candidate	Votes	%	±%
Liberal	Andrew Southcott	38,248	44.81	−1.44
Labor	Annabel Digance	30,515	35.75	+1.63
Greens	Fiona Blinco	11,305	13.24	+3.02
Family First	Meredith Resce	2,120	2.48	+0.04
Independent	Ray McGhee	1,689	1.98	−2.93
Democrats	Thomas Salerno	517	0.61	−0.93
Liberal Democrats	Michael Noack	339	0.40	+0.23
Climate Sceptics	Stephen Skillitzi	316	0.37	+0.37
Secular	Avi Chapman	310	0.36	+0.36
Total formal votes		85,359	95.37	−1.76
Informal votes		4,148	4.63	+1.76
Turnout		89,507	91.43	−4.25
Two-party-preferred result
Liberal	Andrew Southcott	43,317	50.75	−2.18
Labor	Annabel Digance	42,042	49.25	+2.18
Liberal hold		Swing	−2.18	

=== Elections in the 2000s ===
==== 2007 ====
2007 Australian federal election: Boothby
Party	Candidate	Votes	%	±%
Liberal	Andrew Southcott	41,343	46.25	−4.37
Labor	Nicole Cornes	30,501	34.12	−1.72
Greens	Jodi Kirkby	9,137	10.22	+3.11
Independent	Ray McGhee	4,390	4.91	+4.91
Family First	Andrew Cole	2,183	2.44	−0.54
Democrats	Craig Bossie	1,380	1.54	−0.49
One Nation	Barbara Pannach	309	0.35	−0.32
Liberty & Democracy	David Humphreys	154	0.17	+0.17
Total formal votes		89,397	97.13	+1.54
Informal votes		2,639	2.87	−1.54
Turnout		92,036	95.64	+1.05
Two-party-preferred result
Liberal	Andrew Southcott	47,322	52.93	−2.44
Labor	Nicole Cornes	42,075	47.07	+2.44
Liberal hold		Swing	−2.44	

==== 2004 ====
2004 Australian federal election: Boothby
Party	Candidate	Votes	%	±%
Liberal	Andrew Southcott	43,640	50.62	+2.48
Labor	Chloë Fox	30,893	35.84	+9.92
Greens	Adrian Miller	6,131	7.11	+3.93
Family First	Paul Munn	2,571	2.98	+2.98
Democrats	Robert Simms	1,746	2.03	−16.89
Independent	Paul Starling	646	0.75	+0.21
One Nation	Clarke Staker	581	0.67	−1.95
Total formal votes		86,208	95.59	+0.13
Informal votes		3,976	4.41	−0.13
Turnout		90,184	94.59	−1.38
Two-party-preferred result
Liberal	Andrew Southcott	47,730	55.37	−2.00
Labor	Chloë Fox	38,478	44.63	+2.00
Liberal hold		Swing	−2.00	

==== 2001 ====
2001 Australian federal election: Boothby
Party	Candidate	Votes	%	±%
Liberal	Andrew Southcott	39,258	47.93	−0.53
Labor	Jim Murphy	20,976	25.61	−4.82
Democrats	Jo Pride	15,951	19.47	+5.92
Greens	Michelle Drummond	2,516	3.07	+3.07
One Nation	Daniel Piechnick	2,151	2.63	−4.13
Independent	Paul Starling	468	0.57	+0.57
Independent	Jack King	441	0.54	+0.54
	William Manfield	154	0.19	+0.19
Total formal votes		81,915	95.50	−1.47
Informal votes		3,864	4.50	+1.47
Turnout		85,779	95.99	
Two-party-preferred result
Liberal	Andrew Southcott	46,982	57.35	−0.26
Labor	Jim Murphy	34,933	42.65	+0.26
Liberal hold		Swing	−0.26	

=== Elections in the 1990s ===
==== 1998 ====
1998 Australian federal election: Boothby
Party	Candidate	Votes	%	±%
Liberal	Andrew Southcott	36,435	48.22	−5.13
Labor	Jo Chesson	23,547	31.16	+1.71
Democrats	Don Gilbert	9,821	13.00	−0.66
One Nation	Trevor Whittaker	5,213	6.90	+6.90
Natural Law	Bevan Morris	544	0.72	+0.03
Total formal votes		75,560	96.95	−0.32
Informal votes		2,380	3.05	+0.32
Turnout		77,940	95.80	+0.09
Two-party-preferred result
Liberal	Andrew Southcott	43,406	57.45	−4.16
Labor	Jo Chesson	32,154	42.55	+4.16
Liberal hold		Swing	−4.16	

==== 1996 ====
1996 Australian federal election: Boothby
Party	Candidate	Votes	%	±%
Liberal	Andrew Southcott	40,487	53.35	+0.47
Labor	Jeremy Gaynor	22,350	29.45	−4.22
Democrats	Janet Martin	10,367	13.66	+4.08
Greens	Mark Parnell	2,159	2.85	+2.85
Natural Law	Bevan Morris	521	0.69	−1.41
Total formal votes		75,884	97.27	−0.10
Informal votes		2,131	2.73	+0.10
Turnout		78,015	95.71	+0.44
Two-party-preferred result
Liberal	Andrew Southcott	46,428	61.60	+3.80
Labor	Jeremy Gaynor	28,941	38.40	−3.80
Liberal hold		Swing	+3.80	

==== 1993 ====
1993 Australian federal election: Boothby
Party	Candidate	Votes	%	±%
Liberal	Steele Hall	41,708	52.88	+7.89
Labor	Cathy Orr	26,556	33.67	+1.63
Democrats	David Thackrah	7,560	9.59	−9.36
Natural Law	Bevan Morris	1,650	2.09	+2.09
Independent	Reg Macey	1,399	1.77	+1.77
Total formal votes		78,873	97.37	+0.12
Informal votes		2,129	2.63	−0.12
Turnout		81,002	95.27	
Two-party-preferred result
Liberal	Steele Hall	45,557	57.80	+3.29
Labor	Cathy Orr	33,266	42.20	−3.29
Liberal hold		Swing	+3.29	

==== 1990 ====
1990 Australian federal election: Boothby
Party	Candidate	Votes	%	±%
Liberal	Steele Hall	36,010	51.4	−2.7
Labor	Michael Keenan	18,404	26.3	−5.8
Democrats	Margaret-Ann Williams	12,796	18.3	+8.3
Call to Australia	Bruce Byrne	1,515	2.2	+2.2
Independent	Colin Banks	1,300	1.9	+1.9
Total formal votes		70,025	97.7	
Informal votes		1,661	2.3	
Turnout		71,686	95.6	
Two-party-preferred result
Liberal	Steele Hall	42,409	60.7	−0.9
Labor	Michael Keenan	27,421	39.3	+0.9
Liberal hold		Swing	−0.9	

=== Elections in the 1980s ===
==== 1987 ====
1987 Australian federal election: Boothby
Party	Candidate	Votes	%	±%
Liberal	Steele Hall	35,150	54.1	−0.1
Labor	Jayne Taylor	20,837	32.1	−2.9
Democrats	Margaret-Ann Williams	6,523	10.0	+0.2
National	Clarrie Dietman	1,930	3.0	+2.1
Unite Australia	Kevin Angove	494	0.8	+0.8
Total formal votes		64,934	95.4	
Informal votes		3,135	4.6	
Turnout		68,069	93.0	
Two-party-preferred result
Liberal	Steele Hall	40,004	61.6	+2.4
Labor	Jayne Taylor	24,915	38.4	−2.4
Liberal hold		Swing	+2.4	

==== 1984 ====
1984 Australian federal election: Boothby
Party	Candidate	Votes	%	±%
Liberal	Steele Hall	33,640	54.2	+0.7
Labor	Bruce Whyatt	21,736	35.0	−0.6
Democrats	Margaret-Ann Williams	6,064	9.8	−1.1
National	Douglas Lindley	585	0.9	+0.9
Total formal votes		62,025	94.7	
Informal votes		3,472	5.3	
Turnout		65,497	94.0	
Two-party-preferred result
Liberal	Steele Hall	36,724	59.2	+0.7
Labor	Bruce Whyatt	25,292	40.8	−0.7
Liberal hold		Swing	+0.7	

==== 1983 ====
1983 Australian federal election: Boothby
Party	Candidate	Votes	%	±%
Liberal	Steele Hall	42,676	55.1	−1.1
Labor	Bruce Whyatt	26,343	34.0	+4.3
Democrats	John Coulter	8,424	10.9	−2.2
Total formal votes		77,443	98.3	
Informal votes		1,332	1.7	
Turnout		78,775	95.9	
Two-party-preferred result
Liberal	Steele Hall		60.1	−2.5
Labor	Bruce Whyatt		39.9	+2.5
Liberal hold		Swing	−2.5	

==== 1981 by-election ====
1981 Boothby by-election
Party	Candidate	Votes	%	±%
Liberal	Steele Hall	36,406	56.7	+0.5
Labor	Bruce Whyatt	17,108	26.6	−3.0
Democrats	Robert Hercus	9,188	14.3	+1.2
Independent	Alf Gard	555	0.9	+0.9
Unemployed Workers	David Arkins	544	0.8	+0.8
Progressive Conservative	John Herreen	398	0.6	+0.6
Total formal votes		64,199	97.7	
Informal votes		1,480	2.3	
Turnout		65,679	81.7	
Two-party-preferred result
Liberal	Steele Hall		64.0	+1.4
Labor	Bruce Whyatt	27,108	36.0	−1.4
Liberal hold		Swing	+1.4	

==== 1980 ====
1980 Australian federal election: Boothby
Party	Candidate	Votes	%	±%
Liberal	John McLeay	41,542	56.2	−1.2
Labor	Bruce Whyatt	22,001	29.7	+3.9
Democrats	Martin Holt	9,664	13.1	−3.7
Progressive Conservative	James Russell	762	1.0	+1.0
Total formal votes		73,969	98.1	
Informal votes		1,408	1.9	
Turnout		75,377	94.4	
Two-party-preferred result
Liberal	John McLeay		62.6	−3.2
Labor	Bruce Whyatt		37.4	+3.2
Liberal hold		Swing	−3.2	

=== Elections in the 1970s ===
==== 1977 ====
1977 Australian federal election: Boothby
Party	Candidate	Votes	%	±%
Liberal	John McLeay	40,358	57.4	−3.5
Labor	Mark Pickhaver	18,117	25.8	−2.2
Democrats	George Nimmo	11,795	16.8	+16.8
Total formal votes		70,270	97.7	
Informal votes		1,627	2.3	
Turnout		71,897	95.0	
Two-party-preferred result
Liberal	John McLeay		65.8	−3.5
Labor	Mark Pickhaver		34.2	+3.5
Liberal hold		Swing	−3.5	

==== 1975 ====
1975 Australian federal election: Boothby
Party	Candidate	Votes	%	±%
Liberal	John McLeay	34,664	58.1	+13.0
Labor	Mark Pickhaver	18,376	30.8	−3.6
Liberal Movement	Peter Berman	6,172	10.4	−7.6
Independent	Alexander Hunter	408	0.7	+0.7
Total formal votes		59,620	98.2	
Informal votes		1,081	1.8	
Turnout		60,701	96.0	
Two-party-preferred result
Liberal	John McLeay		66.5	+5.4
Labor	Mark Pickhaver		33.5	−5.4
Liberal hold		Swing	+5.4	

==== 1974 ====
1974 Australian federal election: Boothby
Party	Candidate	Votes	%	±%
Liberal	John McLeay	26,193	45.1	−7.3
Labor	John Trainer	19,993	34.4	−3.7
Liberal Movement	Peter Berman	10,477	18.0	+18.0
Australia	Colin Miller	1,423	2.4	−3.2
Total formal votes		58,086	97.9	
Informal votes		1,259	2.1	
Turnout		59,345	95.6	
Two-party-preferred result
Liberal	John McLeay	35,469	61.1	+4.1
Labor	John Trainer	22,617	38.9	−4.1
Liberal hold		Swing	+4.1	

==== 1972 ====
1972 Australian federal election: Boothby
Party	Candidate	Votes	%	±%
Liberal	John McLeay	28,523	52.4	−1.1
Labor	Anne Levy	20,583	38.1	+0.1
Australia	Richard Llewellyn	3,050	5.6	+3.0
Democratic Labor	Ted Farrell	2,086	3.9	−0.1
Total formal votes		54,042	98.1	
Informal votes		1,034	1.9	
Turnout		55,076	95.6	
Two-party-preferred result
Liberal	John McLeay		57.0	−1.9
Labor	Anne Levy		43.0	+1.9
Liberal hold		Swing	−1.9	

=== Elections in the 1960s ===
==== 1969 ====
1969 Australian federal election: Boothby
Party	Candidate	Votes	%	±%
Liberal	John McLeay	27,308	53.5	−12.4
Labor	Chris Sumner	19,391	38.0	+9.3
Democratic Labor	Ted Farrell	2,056	4.0	−1.4
Australia	Frederick Thompson	1,317	2.6	+2.6
Independent	Valerie Lillington	1,014	2.0	+2.0
Total formal votes		51,086	96.5	
Informal votes		1,857	3.5	
Turnout		52,943	95.3	
Two-party-preferred result
Liberal	John McLeay		58.9	−11.5
Labor	Chris Sumner		41.1	+11.5
Liberal hold		Swing	−11.5	

==== 1966 ====
1966 Australian federal election: Boothby
Party	Candidate	Votes	%	±%
Liberal	John McLeay	28,187	65.4	+10.3
Labor	Thomas Sheehy	12,586	29.2	−11.6
Democratic Labor	Ted Farrell	2,315	5.4	+1.2
Total formal votes		43,088	98.1	
Informal votes		826	1.9	
Turnout		43,914	95.7	
Two-party-preferred result
Liberal	John McLeay		69.9	+11.4
Labor	Thomas Sheehy		30.1	−11.4
Liberal hold		Swing	+11.4	

==== 1963 ====
1963 Australian federal election: Boothby
Party	Candidate	Votes	%	±%
Liberal	John McLeay	23,309	55.1	+3.7
Labor	Ronald Basten	17,248	40.8	−1.3
Democratic Labor	Ted Farrell	1,760	4.2	−2.3
Total formal votes		42,317	98.5	
Informal votes		647	1.5	
Turnout		42,964	95.7	
Two-party-preferred result
Liberal	John McLeay		58.5	+1.9
Labor	Ronald Basten		41.5	−1.9
Liberal hold		Swing	+1.9	

==== 1961 ====
1961 Australian federal election: Boothby
Party	Candidate	Votes	%	±%
Liberal	John McLeay	20,976	51.4	−4.2
Labor	Ronald Basten	17,206	42.1	+5.0
Democratic Labor	Ted Farrell	2,660	6.5	−0.7
Total formal votes		40,842	97.1	
Informal votes		1,208	2.9	
Turnout		42,050	95.3	
Two-party-preferred result
Liberal	John McLeay		56.6	−4.8
Labor	Ronald Basten		43.4	+4.8
Liberal hold		Swing	−4.8	

=== Elections in the 1950s ===
==== 1958 ====
1958 Australian federal election: Boothby
Party	Candidate	Votes	%	±%
Liberal	John McLeay	22,401	55.6	−0.6
Labor	Ralph Dettman	14,958	37.1	+1.5
Democratic Labor	George Hodgson	2,907	7.2	−1.0
Total formal votes		40,266	97.0	
Informal votes		1,244	3.0	
Turnout		41,510	96.5	
Two-party-preferred result
Liberal	John McLeay		61.4	−1.4
Labor	Ralph Dettman		38.6	+1.4
Liberal hold		Swing	−1.4	

==== 1955 ====
1955 Australian federal election: Boothby
Party	Candidate	Votes	%	±%
Liberal	John McLeay	22,538	56.2	+2.5
Labor	Rex Mathews	14,291	35.6	−10.7
Labor (A-C)	John Sutherland	3,298	8.2	+8.2
Total formal votes		40,127	96.3	
Informal votes		1,501	3.7	
Turnout		41,628	96.1	
Two-party-preferred result
Liberal	John McLeay		62.8	+9.1
Labor	Rex Mathews		37.2	−9.1
Liberal hold		Swing	+9.1	

==== 1954 ====
1954 Australian federal election: Boothby
Party	Candidate	Votes	%	±%
Liberal	John McLeay	22,263	58.3	−2.8
Labor	Rex Mathews	15,930	41.7	+2.8
Total formal votes		38,193	98.5	
Informal votes		589	1.5	
Turnout		38,782	96.7	
Liberal hold		Swing	−2.8	

==== 1951 ====
1951 Australian federal election: Boothby
Party	Candidate	Votes	%	±%
Liberal	John McLeay	24,644	61.1	−0.2
Labor	Len Wright	15,714	38.9	+0.2
Total formal votes		40,358	98.1	
Informal votes		786	1.9	
Turnout		41,144	96.9	
Liberal hold		Swing	−0.2	

=== Elections in the 1940s ===
==== 1949 ====
1949 Australian federal election: Boothby
Party	Candidate	Votes	%	±%
Liberal	John McLeay	24,897	61.3	+9.3
Labor	Ralph Wells	15,714	38.7	−9.3
Total formal votes		40,611	97.9	
Informal votes		886	2.1	
Turnout		41,497	96.6	
Liberal hold		Swing	+9.3	

==== 1946 ====
1946 Australian federal election: Boothby
Party	Candidate	Votes	%	±%
Labor	Thomas Sheehy	39,724	51.8	+9.5
Liberal	Keith Wilson	36,941	48.2	+3.2
Total formal votes		76,665	97.2	
Informal votes		2,169	2.8	
Turnout		78,834	95.7	
Labor hold		Swing	+0.9	

==== 1943 ====
1943 Australian federal election: Boothby
Party	Candidate	Votes	%	±%
United Australia	Grenfell Price	32,869	45.0	−12.4
Labor	Thomas Sheehy	30,896	42.3	+14.3
Communist	Alan Finger	6,986	9.6	+9.6
Constructive Democrat	John Turner	2,331	3.2	+3.2
Total formal votes		73,082	96.6	
Informal votes		2,597	3.4	
Turnout		75,679	97.4	
Two-party-preferred result
Labor	Thomas Sheehy	37,190	50.9	+16.1
United Australia	Grenfell Price	35,892	49.1	−16.1
Labor gain from United Australia		Swing	+16.1	

==== 1941 by-election ====
1941 Boothby by-election
Party	Candidate	Votes	%	±%
United Australia	Grenfell Price	36,624	56.6	−0.8
Labor	Tom Lawton	28,041	43.4	+15.4
Total formal votes		64,665	97.9	
Informal votes		1,378	2.1	
Turnout		66,043	90.6	
United Australia hold		Swing	−8.6	

==== 1940 ====
1940 Australian federal election: Boothby
Party	Candidate	Votes	%	±%
United Australia	John Price	37,219	57.4	+5.5
Labor	George Edwin Yates	18,131	28.0	−5.0
Independent	William Adey	9,479	14.6	+14.6
Total formal votes		64,829	96.6	
Informal votes		2,279	3.4	
Turnout		67,108	95.0	
Two-party-preferred result
United Australia	John Price		65.2	+5.0
Labor	Edwin Yates		34.8	−5.0
United Australia hold		Swing	+5.0	

=== Elections in the 1930s ===
==== 1937 ====
1937 Australian federal election: Boothby
Party	Candidate	Votes	%	±%
United Australia	John Price	31,362	51.9	−9.1
Labor	Kevin McEntee	12,077	20.0	+7.1
Independent	William Hardy	9,136	15.1	+15.1
Labor	Leonard Pilton	7,859	13.0	+13.0
Total formal votes		60,434	94.0	
Informal votes		3,831	6.0	
Turnout		64,265	96.4	
Two-party-preferred result
United Australia	John Price		59.8	−5.9
Labor	Kevin McEntee		40.2	+5.9
United Australia hold		Swing	−5.9	

==== 1934 ====
1934 Australian federal election: Boothby
Party	Candidate	Votes	%	±%
United Australia	John Price	20,504	36.9	−6.8
Labor	David Fraser	14,427	25.9	+1.1
United Australia	Keith Wilson	13,404	24.1	+24.1
Social Credit	Norman Truscott	3,293	5.9	+5.9
Independent	Charles Barnard	2,953	5.3	+5.3
Independent	James Lumbers	1,052	1.9	+1.9
Total formal votes		55,633	92.3	
Informal votes		4,359	7.3	
Turnout		59,992	94.8	
Two-party-preferred result
United Australia	John Price	36,526	65.7	−6.7
Labor	David Fraser	19,107	34.3	+6.7
United Australia hold		Swing	−6.7	

==== 1931 ====
1931 Australian federal election: Boothby
Party	Candidate	Votes	%	±%
Emergency Committee	John Price	30,440	68.5	+24.1
Labor	Cecil Skitch	10,016	22.5	−33.1
Single Tax League	Sam Lindsay	3,978	9.0	+9.0
Total formal votes		44,434	94.6	
Informal votes		2,530	5.4	
Turnout		46,964	96.1	
Two-party-preferred result
Emergency Committee	John Price		74.0	+29.6
Labor	Cecil Skitch		26.0	−29.6
Emergency Committee gain from Labor		Swing	+29.6	

=== Elections in the 1920s ===
==== 1929 ====
1929 Australian federal election: Boothby
Party	Candidate	Votes	%	±%
Labor	John Price	24,841	55.6	+5.5
Nationalist	Bill McCann	19,847	44.4	−5.5
Total formal votes		44,688	96.7	
Informal votes		1,548	3.3	
Turnout		46,236	93.8	
Labor hold		Swing	+5.5	

==== 1928 ====
1928 Australian federal election: Boothby
Party	Candidate	Votes	%	±%
Labor	John Price	20,666	50.1	+7.7
Nationalist	Jack Duncan-Hughes	20,582	49.9	−7.7
Total formal votes		41,248	91.4	
Informal votes		3,886	8.6	
Turnout		45,134	93.8	
Labor gain from Nationalist		Swing	+7.7	

==== 1925 ====
1925 Australian federal election: Boothby
Party	Candidate	Votes	%	±%
Nationalist	Jack Duncan-Hughes	23,602	57.6	+36.4
Labor	Harry Kneebone	17,409	42.4	+3.0
Total formal votes		41,011	96.5	
Informal votes		1,483	3.5	
Turnout		42,494	93.8	
Nationalist gain from Liberal		Swing	+2.9	

==== 1922 ====
1922 Australian federal election: Boothby
Party	Candidate	Votes	%	±%
Liberal	Jack Duncan-Hughes	7,793	39.5	+39.5
Labor	Harry Kneebone	7,775	39.4	+5.3
Nationalist	William Story	4,179	21.2	−44.7
Total formal votes		19,747	93.3	
Informal votes		1,411	6.7	
Turnout		21,158	53.4	
Two-party-preferred result
Liberal	Jack Duncan-Hughes	10,804	54.7	+54.7
Labor	Harry Kneebone	8,943	45.3	+11.2
Liberal gain from Nationalist		Swing	−11.2	

=== Elections in the 1910s ===
==== 1919 ====
1919 Australian federal election: Boothby
Party	Candidate	Votes	%	±%
Nationalist	William Story	18,501	63.5	−1.0
Labor	Stanley Whitford	8,872	30.4	−5.1
Independent	George Illingworth	1,779	6.1	+6.1
Total formal votes		29,152	92.6	
Informal votes		2,341	7.4	
Turnout		31,493	67.3	
Two-party-preferred result
Nationalist	William Story		66.6	+2.1
Labor	Stanley Whitford		33.4	−2.1
Nationalist hold		Swing	+2.1	

==== 1917 ====
1917 Australian federal election: Boothby
Party	Candidate	Votes	%	±%
Nationalist	William Story	21,293	64.5	+19.8
Labor	John Gunn	11,700	35.5	−19.8
Total formal votes		32,993	96.9	
Informal votes		1,067	3.1	
Turnout		34,060	74.1	
Nationalist gain from Labor		Swing	+19.8	

==== 1914 ====
1914 Australian federal election: Boothby
Party	Candidate	Votes	%	±%
Labor	George Dankel	18,822	55.3	+2.3
Liberal	Samuel Hunt	15,227	44.7	−2.3
Total formal votes		34,049	97.8	
Informal votes		755	2.2	
Turnout		34,804	81.8	
Labor hold		Swing	+2.3	

==== 1913 ====
1913 Australian federal election: Boothby
Party	Candidate	Votes	%	±%
Labor	George Dankel	16,976	53.0	−13.8
Liberal	David Gordon	15,035	47.0	+13.8
Total formal votes		32,011	96.5	
Informal votes		1,158	3.5	
Turnout		33,169	80.5	
Labor gain from Liberal		Swing	−10.8	

==== 1911 by-election ====
1911 Boothby by-election
Party	Candidate	Votes	%	±%
Liberal	David Gordon	10,656	57.1	+57.1
Labour	James Jelley	8,008	42.9	−20.9
Total formal votes		18,664	99.8	
Informal votes		38	0.2	
Turnout		18,702	52.8	
Liberal gain from Labour		Swing	N/A	

==== 1910 ====
1910 Australian federal election: Boothby
Party	Candidate	Votes	%	±%
Labour	Lee Batchelor	9,786	63.8	−36.2
Independent Liberal	Paris Nesbit	5,546	36.2	+36.2
Total formal votes		15,332	91.8	
Informal votes		1,367	8.2	
Turnout		16,699	55.4	
Labour hold		Swing	−36.2	

=== Elections in the 1900s ===
==== 1906 ====
1906 Australian federal election: Boothby
Party	Candidate	Votes	%	±%
Labour	Lee Batchelor	unopposed		
Labour hold		Swing		

==== 1903 ====
1903 Australian federal election: Boothby
Party	Candidate	Votes	%	±%
Labour	Lee Batchelor	5,775	54.6	+54.6
Free Trade	Vaiben Louis Solomon	4,802	45.4	+45.4
Total formal votes		10,577	97.5	
Informal votes		276	2.5	
Turnout		10,853	43.1	
Labour win		(new seat)		
