= McLeay =

McLeay is a surname. Notable people with the surname include:

- George McLeay (1892–1955), Australian politician
- Glenn McLeay (born 1968), New Zealand cyclist
- John McLeay Jr. (1922–2000), Australian politician
- John McLeay Sr. (1893–1982), Australian politician
- Leo McLeay (born 1945), Australian politician
- Paul McLeay (born 1972), Australian politician

== See also ==
- Macleay (disambiguation)
