= John McLeay =

John McLeay is the name of two generations of Australian politicians:

- John McLeay Sr., Liberal MP 1949–1966
- John McLeay Jr., Liberal MP 1966–1981
