= Macleay =

MacLeay or Macleay or McLeay may refer to:

== People ==
- Alexander Macleay (1767–1848), Scottish civil servant and entomologist.
- George Macleay (1809–1891), Australian explorer and politician.
- George McLeay (1892–1955), Australian politician
- Glenn McLeay (born 1968), New Zealand cyclist
- John McLeay Jr. (1922–2000), Australian politician
- John McLeay Sr. (1893–1982), Australian politician
- Ken MacLeay (born 1959), English-born Australian cricketer.
- Leo McLeay (born 1945), Australian politician.
- Paul McLeay (born 1972), Australian politician
- William John Macleay (1820–1891), Australian politician and naturalist.
- William Sharp Macleay (1792–1865), British entomologist.

== Places ==
- Electoral district of Macleay, New South Wales, Australia.
- Macleay Island, Moreton Bay, Queensland, Australia.
- Macleay Museum of science, University of Sydney, Australia.
- Macleay River, New South Wales, Australia.
- Macleay Shire, a former LGA in New South Wales, Australia.

== Animals ==
- Macleay's dorcopsis, Dorcopsulus macleayi, a marsupial.
- Macleay's honeyeater, Xanthotis macleayanus, a bird.
- Macleay's mustached bat, Pteronotus macleayii.
- Macleay's swallowtail, Graphium macleayanus, a butterfly.
- Macleay's spectre, Extatosoma tiaratum, a stick insect.
