= Nicole Cornes =

Australian politician (born 1970)

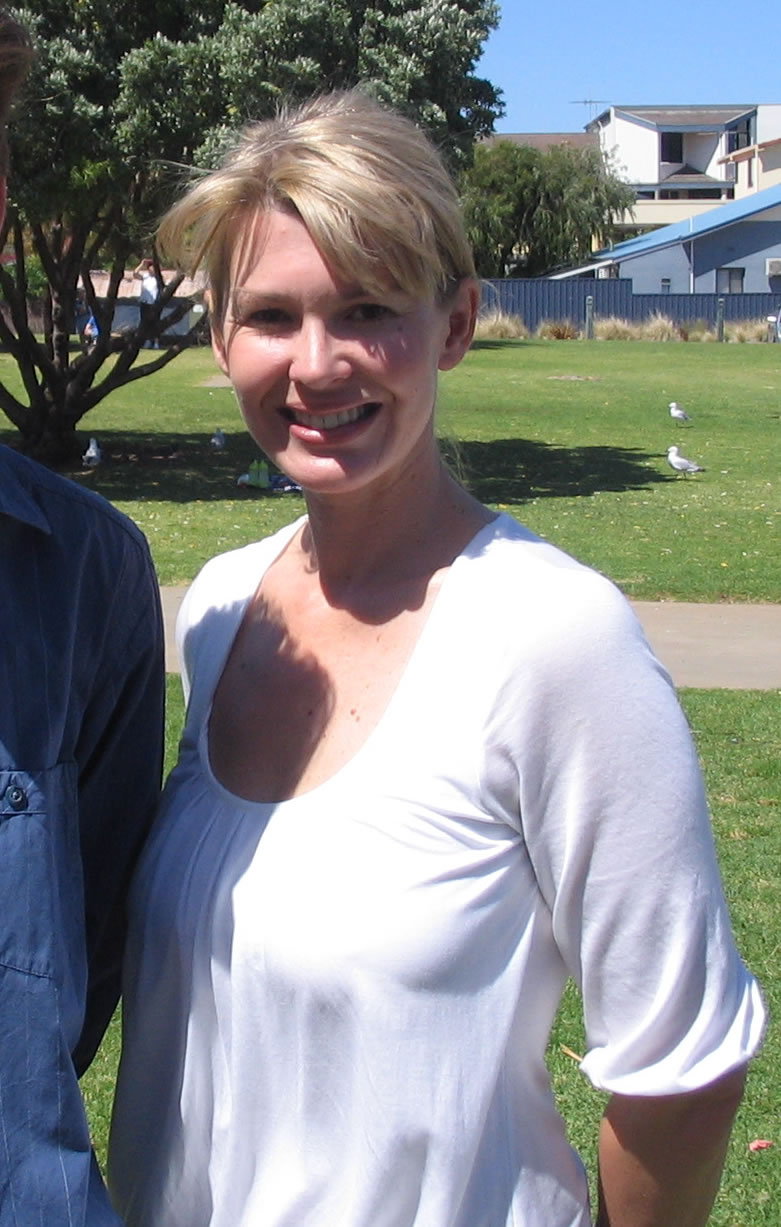

Nicole Joanne Cornes (born 7 January 1970) is a union legal officer, a former newspaper columnist and a former Australian Labor political candidate. She was the unsuccessful 2007 Australian Labor Party candidate for the division of Boothby, a marginal Liberal seat in the south of Adelaide.

== Early life ==
Nicole Cornes was born in Adelaide, growing up in the suburb of Marino. She attended St Theresa's Primary School, Brighton, Marymount College, and Sacred Heart College, Somerton Park. She left school at 14 and held various jobs including as a receptionist at Adelaide radio station 5AA. At 19 she met her future husband 22 years her senior Graham Cornes, a radio presenter at 5AA and former notable Australian rules football player. She has completed a law degree at Flinders University, and works as a legal officer for the Shop Distributive and Allied Employees' Association, SA Branch. She is also completing a Master of Law. For several years she was a regular columnist for the Sunday Mail.

== Political career ==
Cornes' first political involvement began when she was approached by family friend and State Deputy Premier Kevin Foley to run as the Labor candidate for the South Australian Division of Boothby in the 2007 federal election, reportedly after her husband declined the nomination. Cornes admitted at a press conference that she had previously voted for the Liberal party, specifically for political opponent Liberal John Howard, and had written about him as a "fine PM" in her newspaper column.

Cornes's early campaign was marked by several gaffes, such as when she admitted that she was not familiar with Labor policies. When Cornes was contacted for an interview by the Adelaide Advertiser, she said:

"I won't have to answer any tough questions, no hard-hitting questions, will I? I've had just about enough of those questions."

She was also quoted as saying her difficult first interview would not have been better for more preparation:

"I'm still going to lose my words, my thought patterns are still going to get jumbled. In a way, that's a bit of my personality too".

Such comments generated intense public and media interest that was generally unfavourable. Despite such negativity, Cornes resolutely conducted her campaign, concentrating on traditional methods such as door-knocking, train stations, street-corner meetings and public forums.

=== 2007 federal election results ===
The electoral results for the Division of Boothby showed that Cornes obtained 30,501 votes first preference votes (34.12%) compared to long-time sitting member Andrew Southcott's 41,343 (46.25%). The two-party preferred result was 47% to 53% split, a swing of -2.44% from Southcott. This was in the context of a South Australian state swing of 6.76% to the Labor Party.

Political journalist Alan Ramsey added some balance to her controversial candidature when he noted:

"No candidate for any party in any state emerged with more dignity in "losing" on election night than Cornes."

After the election, journalist Andrew Bolt apologised to Cornes for calling her a dill on the television show the Insiders, stating:

"I still think she was certainly no great candidate, but I very much regret that insult after watching last night's Australian Story. From the show I learned that during her torrid campaign she was also going through a highly emotional court case against a relative who had abused her when she was just five. I also learned that the media coverage on which I'd relied in forming my opinion may not have been quite fair. Given all that, I've found a new respect for her strength and composure. And I'm cross with myself at having been unfair. I'm the real dill."

== Victim of child abuse ==
After the election, Nicole Cornes was featured in an episode of the ABC's Australian Story program which focused on her unsuccessful campaign. During the episode it was revealed that she had been campaigning while also appearing in court as the victim in a child abuse case. The accused was convicted and eventually lost his appeal. The final appeal was dismissed four months after the election was held.

== Defamation case ==
In 2011, Cornes successfully sued the Network Ten television station for comments made on its AFL-themed panel discussion show, Before the Game, by comedian Mick Molloy. During the episode in question, Molloy made a joke implying that Hawthorn footballer Stuart Dew (formerly a teammate of Cornes's stepsons Kane and Chad Cornes at Port Adelaide) had slept with her. The joke was in reference to comments Cornes had made in her newspaper column praising Dew for having stated he would be prepared to walk away from his AFL career in order to support his then-girlfriend, actress Teresa Palmer, and describing him therein as "a great catch". Justice David Peek awarded Cornes $93,000 in damages, costs and interest. Network Ten is appealing the decision

== Personal life ==
She is the third wife of former Australian rules footballer and coach Graham Cornes, 22 years her senior, and stepmother to his two sons. They have three children.
