= Douglas Peel Gordon =

Australian pastoralist and politician

Douglas Peel Gordon (20 October 1892 – 9 October 1948) was a pastoralist and politician in South Australia.

== History ==
Gordon was born at Semaphore, the elder son of Sir David Gordon. In World War I he served with the First AIF in Egypt and Gallipoli. He gained experience in sheep and cattle raising in New South Wales and the Far North of South Australia, Myrtle Springs Station (near Copley) and finally settled on a property at Mount Crawford.

He was president of the Liberal and Country League from 1943 to 1946 and a foundation member of the Federal Council of the Liberal Party of Australia. He was a member of the Barossa District Council for 11 years.

He served as a member for the Midland district on the South Australian Legislative Council for the Liberal and Country League from 8 March 1947 to 9 October 1948.

== Family ==
He married Mary Dorothea "Mollie" Matters of Unley Park on 2 April 1924; they had three sons:

- David Matters Gordon (28 January 1925 – 24 August 2014 )
- Thomas Matters Gordon (26 March 1927 – 26 February 1938)
- Douglas Waterhouse Gordon (28 August 1930 – 25 September 1996)
