= Thomas Sheehy =

Australian politician

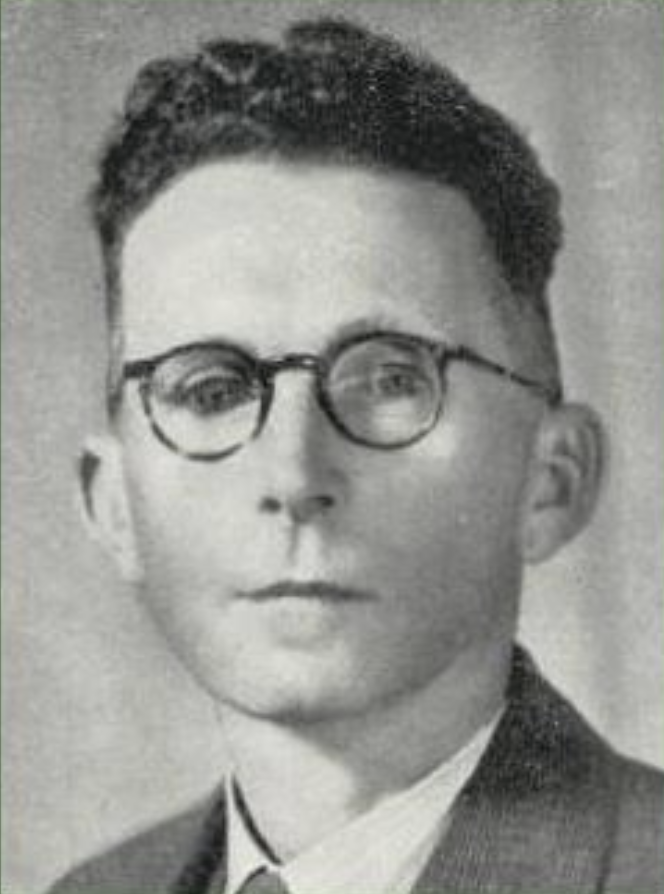

Member of the Australian Parliament for Boothby
- In office 21 August 1943 – 10 December 1949
- Preceded by: Grenfell Price
- Succeeded by: John McLeay, Sr.

Personal details
- Born: 19 May 1899 Adelaide, South Australia
- Died: 23 September 1984 (aged 85)
- Party: Australian Labor Party

Thomas Neil Sheehy (19 May 1899 – 23 September 1984) was a Labor member of the Australian House of Representatives from 1943 to 1949, representing the Division of Boothby, South Australia.

Sheehy defeated Boothby incumbent Grenfell Price at the landslide 1943 election on a 50.9 percent two-party vote from a 16.1 percent two-party swing. He retained the seat at the 1946 election on an increased two-party vote of 51.8 percent. With the increase in seats before the 1949 election, a redistribution erased Sheehy's majority and made Boothby notionally Liberal. Although the reconfigured Boothby had a notional Liberal margin of two percent, Sheehy concluded that the redistribution made Boothby impossible to hold and attempted to transfer to the newly created neighbouring seat of Kingston, which had absorbed much of the southern portion of his old seat. However, he was defeated with a 48.4 percent two-party vote by Liberal Jim Handby. Meanwhile, Labor lost Boothby from a 9.3 percent two-party swing.

Sheehy sought to retake his old seat in 1966, but was heavily defeated by Liberal John McLeay, Jr.

== Notes ==
Parliament of Australia
Preceded by Grenfell Price	Member for Boothby; 1943–1949	Succeeded by John McLeay, Sr.
