= Department of Construction =

Australian government department, 1975–1978

Department overview
- Formed: 22 December 1975
- Preceding Department: Department of Housing and Construction (I)
- Dissolved: 5 December 1978
- Superseding Department: Department of Housing and Construction (II)
- Jurisdiction: Commonwealth of Australia
- Minister responsible: John McLeay Jr., Minister
- Department executives: Alan Reiher, Secretary (1975–1976); George Warwick Smith, Secretary (1976–1978)

The Department of Construction was an Australian government department that existed between December 1975 and December 1978.

== Scope ==
Information about the department's functions and government funding allocation could be found in the Administrative Arrangements Orders, the annual Portfolio Budget Statements and in the Department's annual reports.

The functions of the Department at its creation were:

- Planning, execution and maintenance of Australian government works
- Design, provision and maintenance of furniture furnishings and fittings for the Australian government

== Structure ==
The Department was a Commonwealth Public Service department, staffed by officials who were responsible to the Minister for Construction, John McLeay Jr.
