= William Story (Australian politician) =

Australian politician (1857–1924)

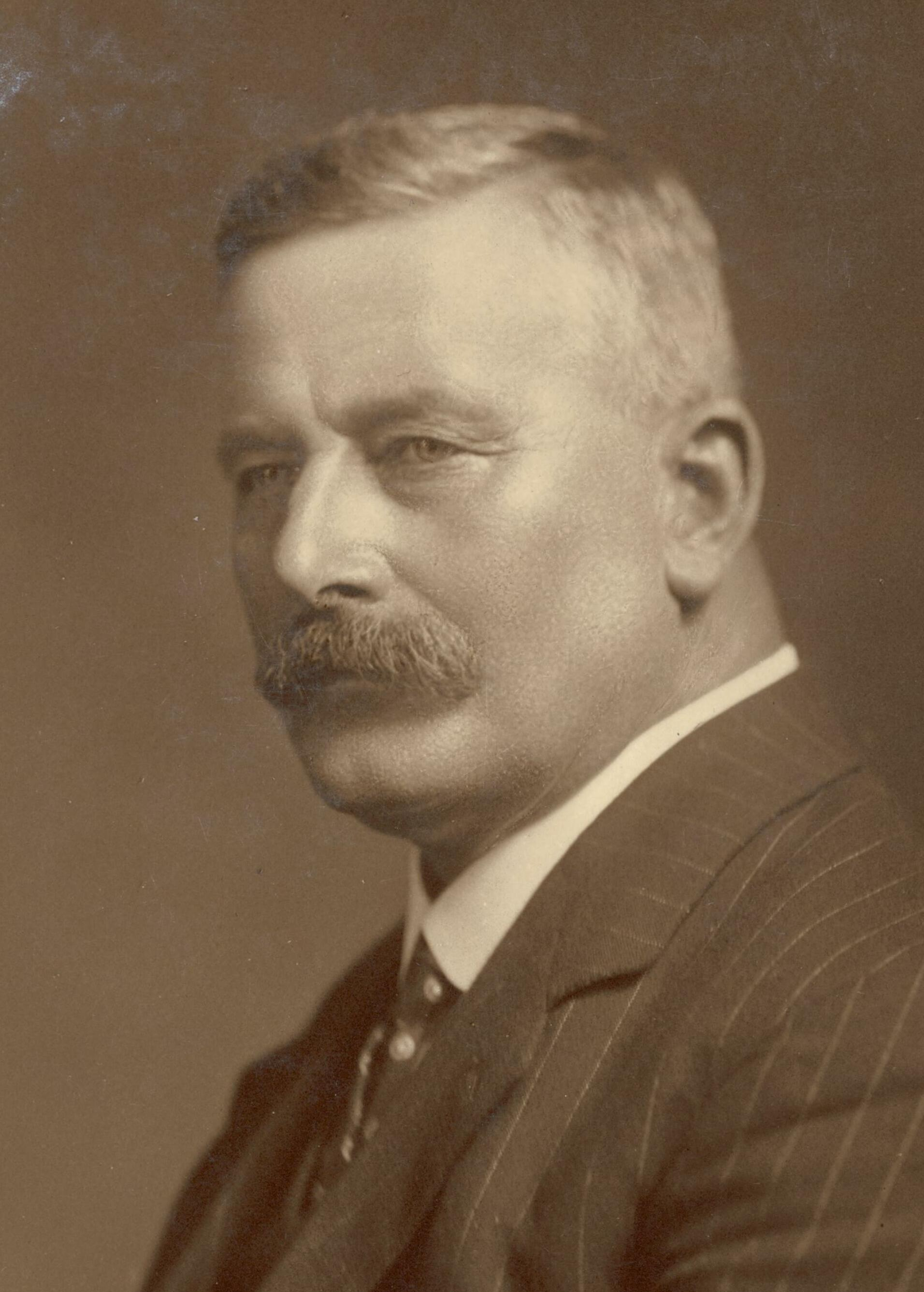

Senator for South Australia
- In office 1 January 1904 – 3 April 1917
- Succeeded by: James Rowell

Member of the Australian Parliament for Boothby
- In office 5 May 1917 – 16 December 1922
- Preceded by: George Dankel
- Succeeded by: Jack Duncan-Hughes

Personal details
- Born: 31 May 1857 Mitcham, South Australia, Australia
- Died: 13 July 1924 (aged 67) Norwood, South Australia, Australia
- Party: Labor (to 1916); National Labor (1916–1917); Nationalist (from 1917)
- Other political affiliations: National (state)
- Spouse: Sarah Malcolm (m. 1880)
- Occupation: Builder

William Harrison Story (31 May 1857 – 13 July 1924) was an Australian builder, trade unionist and politician. He was a Senator for South Australia from 1904 to 1917 and then represented the seat of Bootby in the House of Representatives from 1917 to 1922. He was one of the founders of the Australian Labor Party (ALP) in South Australia, but left the party during the 1916 split over conscription and subsequently joined the new Nationalist Party. He was a bricklayer and mason by profession, later starting his own building and contracting firm. He also served as mayor of Kensington and Norwood from 1901 to 1903.

== Early life ==
Story was born on 31 May 1857 in Mitcham, South Australia. He was the son of Eliza (née Morgan) and George Story; his father was employed as a gardener at the time of his birth but later became a municipal clerk.

Story spent his early years at Norton Summit where his father was gardener to Thomas Playford. He attended the Norton Summit State School and was then apprenticed as a bricklayer and mason. He became active in the labour movement as president of the Operative Masons' and Bricklayers' Society, also serving as the union's delegate to the United Trades and Labour Council of South Australia (UTLC's). He joined the UTLC's committee in 1884.

In 1890, Story went into partnership with Daniel Sutherland in the contracting firm of Sutherland & Story. He was elected to the Kensington and Norwood Town Council in 1895 and was re-elected in 1897 and 1899. He was elected mayor of Kensington and Norwood in 1901, where he was known as an advocate of municipal ownership of transport and utilities. He also served as president of the South Australian Builders' and Contractors' Association from 1902 to 1904.

== Politics ==
=== Senate ===
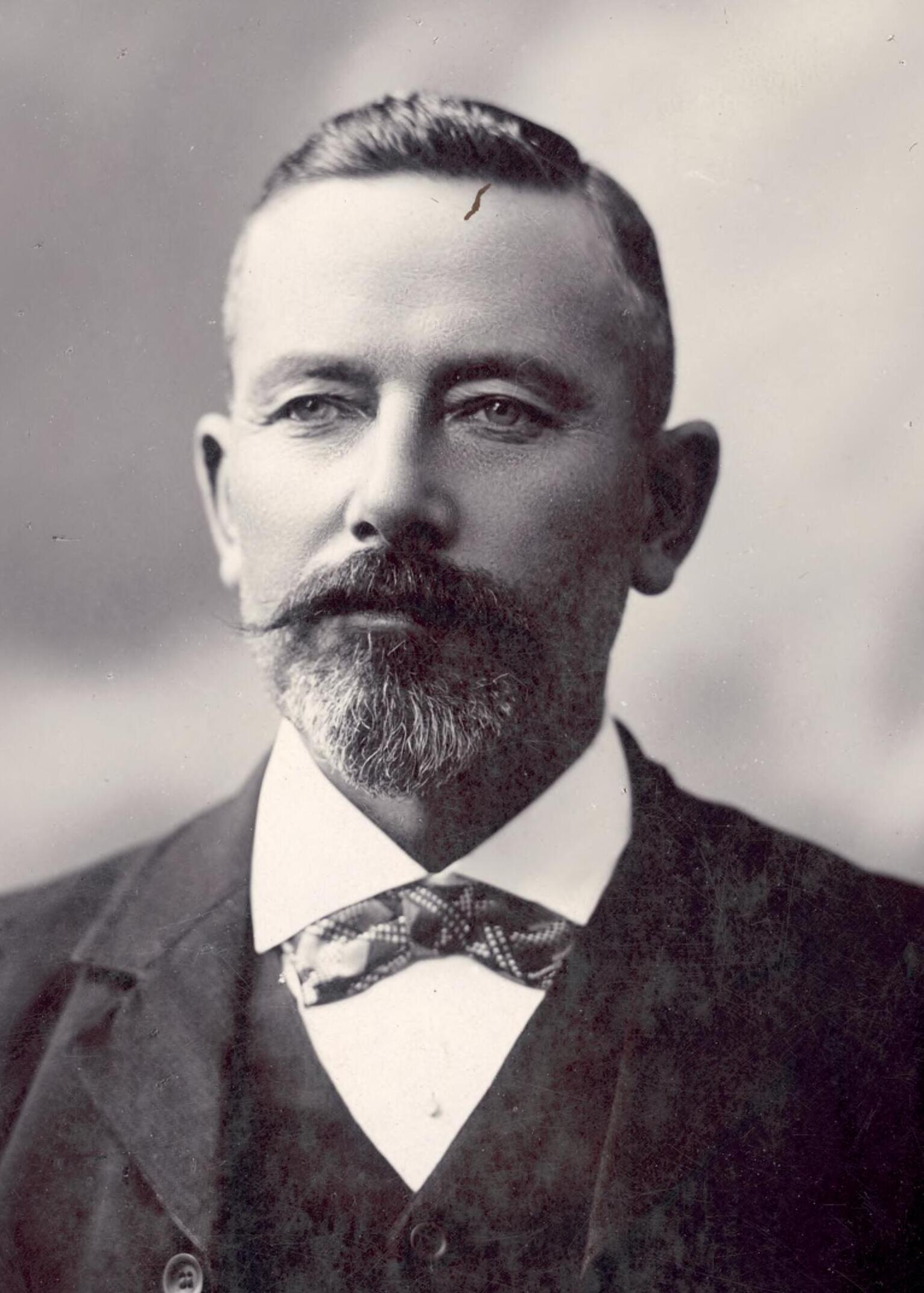
Story c. 1905

Story declined requests by the ALP to stand for the Parliament of South Australia on several occasions. He was elected to a six-year Senate term at the 1903 federal election, and re-elected to further six-year terms on the ALP ticket at the 1910 and 1914 election (following a double dissolution).

Story was a strong supporter of union preference during debate on the Conciliation and Arbitration Act 1904. He was an advocate of developing the Australian manufacturing industry, but was opposed to industrial monopolies and supported nationalisation or government control over industry. Story served on the Joint Committee on Public Works from 1914 to 1917. He supported the construction of the Trans-Australian Railway and Central Australia Railway and said the government should prioritise development of the Northern Territory over the creation of a new national capital. He was also interested in the negotiations over the River Murray between New South Wales, South Australia and Victoria, having earlier proclaimed his support for the abolition of state governments.

During the ALP split over conscription in 1916, Story supported Prime Minister Billy Hughes' attempts to require conscripted soldiers to serve overseas. When Hughes was expelled from the ALP, he followed him into the new National Labor Party, which subsequently merged with the Liberal Party to form a new Nationalist Party government.

=== House of Representatives ===
Story resigned from the Senate on 3 March 1917 to stand for the House of Representatives at the 1917 election. He retained the seat of Boothby for the Nationalists following the retirement of fellow Labor defector George Dankel, becoming the first South Australian to serve in both houses of parliament. His candidacy also received the endorsement of the Liberal Union, although in March 1917 he had proclaimed that "I am just as good a Labour man as ever I was . . . I believe in every plank of the party platform as strongly as ever I did".

Story served as government whip from 1918 to 1922. He lost his seat at the 1922 election, where he failed to poll in the top two candidates. He was endorsed only by the National Party, with the Liberal Union instead endorsing Jack Duncan-Hughes, the eventual victor. In his speech at the declaration of the poll he criticised the conservative element in the Liberal Union for attempting to destroy the National Party and return to a straight two-party system.

== Personal life ==
In 1880, Story married Sarah Malcolm, with whom he had eight children. His youngest son Ward was killed in World War I. He had been a resident of Norwood for nearly 40 years at the time of his death there on 13 July 1924, aged 67.

Parliament of Australia
| Preceded by George Dankel | Member for Boothby; 1917–1922 | Succeeded by Jack Duncan-Hughes |
