= Nicolle Flint =

Australian politician

Member of the Australian Parliament for Boothby
- In office 2 July 2016 – 11 April 2022
- Preceded by: Andrew Southcott
- Succeeded by: Louise Miller-Frost

Personal details
- Born: 15 July 1978 (age 48) Kingston SE, South Australia, Australia
- Party: Liberal
- Education: Flinders University
- Occupation: Columnist, political advisor
- Profession: Solicitor

Nicolle Jane Flint (born 15 July 1978) is an Australian politician. She was a member of the House of Representatives from 2016 to 2022, representing the Division of Boothby in South Australia. She is a member of the Liberal Party and succeeded the previous member, the Liberal Party’s Andrew Southcott, at the 2016 federal election.

Flint announced on 26 February 2021 that she would not contest the 2022 Australian federal election. She gave her valedictory speech on 16 February 2022.

On 1 May 2024, Flint was announced as the Liberal Party candidate for the Division of Boothby in the 2025 Australian federal election, however Flint was unsuccessful, losing to Labor’s Louise Miller-Frost on a 7.8% two party preferred swing.

== Early political involvement ==
Flint was a member of the Young Liberal Movement from 2000 to 2002 and joined the Liberal Party in 2007. She was a solicitor and newspaper columnist before entering politics, and also worked as an advisor to Malcolm Turnbull and Brendan Nelson. She also worked for the Australian Chamber of Commerce and Industry. In 2015, Flint co-authored a paper for the Menzies Research Centre entitled "Gender and Politics", calling for more female involvement in the Liberal Party.

== Member of Parliament ==
=== First term ===
Flint was elected to the Australian House of Representatives for the seat of Boothby in 2016, replacing retiring MP Andrew Southcott, who had held the seat since 1996. During her first term, Flint raised awareness in Parliament for endometriosis, with the government allocating $2.5 million to researchers for finding new ways of detecting and treating the disease.

In 2017, Flint bought 400 copies of a book published by the Menzies Research Centre, a Liberal Party think tank, spending $5818. This was more than any other politician spent on publications between July 2017 and June 2018, despite the book being available online for free. During the 2018 Liberal Party leadership spills, Flint was one of 43 party members to sign a petition calling for Prime Minister Malcolm Turnbull to call for a second leadership spill.

=== 2019 election ===
In April 2018, the Australian Electoral Commission rearranged the electoral boundaries of South Australia to reduce the number of seats from 11 to 10, in accordance with South Australia's shrinking percentage of the Australian population. The changes to the seat of Boothby resulted in Flint's 2016 margin of 3.5% shrinking to 2.8%. After the redistribution, Boothby was the only marginal seat in the state, making it a target for the Australian Labor Party in the 2019 Australian federal election. Flint was also a target of the progressive activist group GetUp, who labelled her South Australia's "most backwards politician". Days before the election, Flint's campaign office was vandalised with offensive graffiti. She faced further harassment during the campaign, with a man cautioned for allegedly stalking her and her office also being egged.

The race was too close to call on the night of the election, but Flint was eventually declared the winner of the election. Whilst her first preference vote share increased by 3.5%, she suffered a negative swing of 1.3% in the two candidate preferred results. Following the election, Flint accused GetUp, Labor and trade union supporters of being responsible for harassment, intimidation and stalking against her during the campaign, and Prime Minister Scott Morrison labelled the actions as misogynistic and bullying.

=== Return to Politics ===
On 1 May 2024, Leader of the Opposition Peter Dutton announced that Flint was re-contesting her former seat at the 2025 federal election as the Liberal candidate for Boothby. She lost to Miller-Frost on a large swing.

== Political views ==
Flint is a member of the National Right faction of the Liberal Party.

Before her election Flint's political views were expressed in regular opinion editorial columns in The Advertiser. She has stated that the Labor Party should have done more to prevent the harassment and intimidation she experienced during the 2019 election campaign.

As a conservative, Flint opposed same-sex marriage during the 2017 same-sex plebiscite, stating that "majority [Australians] want a change to the traditional definition of marriage.” Flint's political stance is heavily influenced by her Christian beliefs, and she has often supported policies that align with the Australian Christian Lobby. Additionally, she has expressed opposition to renewable energy initiatives and policies. Flint has stated she opposes quotas for women in the Liberal party.

Flint has often expressed concerns over culture war issues such as welcome to country.

As an MP, Flint consistently voted against increasing investment in renewable energy and on greater action to stop animal and plant extinctions.

Parliament of Australia
| Preceded by Andrew Southcott | Member for Boothby; 2016–2022 | Succeeded by Louise Miller-Frost |
