= Grenfell Price =

Australian geographer, historian and educationist

Sir Grenfell Price CMG, FRGS
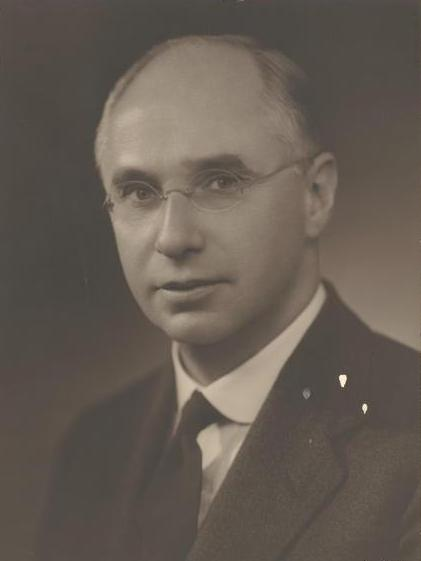

Member of the Australian Parliament for Boothby
- In office 24 May 1941 – 21 August 1943
- Preceded by: John Price
- Succeeded by: Thomas Sheehy

Personal details
- Born: 28 January 1892 North Adelaide, South Australia
- Died: 20 July 1977 (aged 85) North Adelaide, South Australia
- Party: United Australia Party
- Spouse: Kitty Pauline Hayward
- Education: Oxford University
- Profession: Academic

Sir Archibald Grenfell Price CMG FRGS (28 January 1892 – 20 July 1977) was an Australian geographer, historian and educationist.

== Life ==
Price was born at North Adelaide and was the only surviving son of Henry Archibald Price, banker and businessman, and his wife Elizabeth Jane, née Harris. He was educated at the Queen's School, North Adelaide and St Peter's College. After failing the entrance examination for the University of Adelaide, he managed to get into Magdalen College, Oxford, from which he graduated a B.A. in 1914, Dip. Ed. in 1915 and M.A. in 1919. He represented Magdalen in cricket, tennis, hockey, lacrosse and rowing.

Back in Adelaide, Price coached the athletic team of St. Peter's College from 1916 to 1924. On 20 January 1917, he married Kitty Pauline Hayward, daughter of an Adelaide solicitor. In 1921, he was elected a fellow of the Royal Geographical Society. In 1925, he was appointed founding master of St. Mark's College, University of Adelaide, a post he held until 1957. In 1933, he was made a Companion of the Order of St Michael and St George (CMG) for his services to education.

In May 1941, Price won a by-election for the seat of Boothby in the Australian House of Representatives and held the seat until the 1943 election. Knighted in 1963 for his services to education, he was one of the founders of the Australian National Library, Canberra and a Founding Fellow of the Australian Academy of the Humanities in 1969. In 1973, Price became an honorary member of the American Geographical Society. He died in North Adelaide.

His elder son Charles (b. 1920) was a noted demographer at the Australian National University.

== Publications ==
- A Causal Geography of the World (1918)
- South Australians and their Environment (1921)
- The Foundation and Settlement of South Australia 1829-1845 (1924)
- Founders & Pioneers of South Australia (1929)
- The World: a General Geography (with L. Dudley Stamp, London, 1929)
- The History and Problems of the Northern Territory (1930)
- The Centenary History of South Australia (member of editorial board, wrote 3 chapters, 1936)
- White Settlers in the Tropics (New York, 1939)
- The First Hundred Years (1940)
- What of our Aborigines? (1944)
- Australia Comes of Age (Melbourne, 1945)
- White Settlers and Native Peoples (Melbourne, 1949)
- Northern Australia: Task for a Nation (Sydney, 1954)
- The Explorations of Captain James Cook in the Pacific (New York, 1957)
- The Winning of Australian Antarctica (Sydney, 1962)
- The Western Invasions of the Pacific and its Continents (Oxford, 1963)
- The Importance of Disease in History (1964)
- The Challenge of New Guinea (Sydney, 1965)
- A History of St Mark's College (1968)
- The Skies Remember (Sydney, 1969)
- Island Continent (Sydney, 1972)

Parliament of Australia
Preceded by John Price	Member for Boothby; 1941–1943	Succeeded by Thomas Sheehy
