= Division of Boothby =

Australian federal electoral division

Coordinates: 35.012°S 138.596°E

Boothby Australian House of Representatives Division
- Interactive map of boundaries since the 2019 federal election
- Created: 1903
- MP: Louise Miller-Frost
- Party: Labor
- Namesake: William Boothby
- Electors: 129,585 (2025)
- Area: 115 km^{2} (44.4 sq mi)
- Demographic: Outer metropolitan

The Division of Boothby is an Australian federal electoral division in South Australia. The division was one of the seven established when the former Division of South Australia was redistributed on 2 October 1903 and is named after William Boothby (1829–1903), the Returning Officer for the first federal election.

At the 2016 federal election, the seat covered 130 km², extending from Clarence Gardens and Urrbrae in the north to Marino and part of Happy Valley in the south, including the suburbs of Belair, Blackwood, Brighton, Daw Park, Eden Hills, Marion, Mitcham, Seacliff, St Marys and Panorama.

== Geography ==
Since 1984, federal electoral division boundaries in Australia have been determined at redistributions by a redistribution committee appointed by the Australian Electoral Commission. Redistributions occur for the boundaries of divisions in a particular state, and they occur every seven years, or sooner if a state's representation entitlement changes or when divisions of a state are malapportioned.

== History ==
Before 1949 and the creation of the Division of Sturt, Boothby covered most of the southern and eastern suburbs of Adelaide. For much of the first half-century after Federation, it was one of only three seats based on the capital, the others being Adelaide and Hindmarsh. The mostly rural seat of Barker was then considered a "hybrid urban-rural" seat, stretching from the southern tip of South Australia at least as far as Glenelg and the Holdfast Bay area, and at times even stretched as far as the western metropolitan suburbs of Keswick and Henley Beach.

For most of the first half-century after Federation, Boothby was a marginal seat that changed hands several times between the Liberal Party of Australia (and its predecessors) and the Australian Labor Party (ALP). The 1949 expansion of parliament saw parts of the southern portion transferred to the newly created Division of Kingston and parts of the eastern portion transferred to the newly created Sturt. This saw Boothby change from a marginal Labor seat on a 1.8 percent two-party margin to a marginal Liberal seat on a two percent two-party margin. However, as part of the massive Liberal victory in the 1949 election, the Liberals picked up a 9.3 percent two-party swing, turning it into a safe Liberal seat in one stroke. The Liberals mostly held the seat for the next 73 years as a fairly safe Liberal seat.

There was only one substantial redistribution in the past few decades when Boothby absorbed parts of the abolished Division of Hawker before the 1993 election. This cut the Liberal margin by more than half, from a safe 10.7 two-party margin to a marginal notional 4.5 percent two-party margin. However, the Liberals won the seat on a fairly safe 7.8 percent two-party margin. As of 2007, Boothby extended from Mitcham and Belair in the east to Brighton and Seacliff in the west.

Boothby's most prominent member was Steele Hall, who most notably served as Premier of South Australia from 1968 to 1970. After leaving state politics, Hall served in the Senate before transferring to Boothby in a 1981 by-election. Hall retired at the 1996 election and the seat was subsequently held from 1996 to 2016 by Andrew Southcott. Other notable members include Lee Batchelor, a minister in the Watson and Fisher governments; Sir John McLeay, who was Speaker from 1956 to 1966, and his son John, Jr., a minister in the Fraser government.

At the 2004 election, despite a solid national two-party swing and vote to the Liberals, Boothby became a marginal Liberal seat for the first time in over half a century, with Labor's Chloë Fox reducing the Liberal margin to 5.4 percent even as incumbent Andrew Southcott narrowly won enough primary votes to retain the seat without the need for preferences. Labor's Nicole Cornes reduced Southcott's margin even further to 2.9 percent at the 2007 election. At the 2010 election Labor's Annabel Digance came within 638 votes of ending the long Liberal run in the seat. At 0.75 percent Boothby was the most marginal seat in South Australia. However, Boothby became a fairly safe Liberal seat again at the 2013 election.

In 2015, Southcott announced his retirement from parliament to take effect at the 2016 federal election. The Liberals preselected doctoral student and newspaper columnist Nicolle Flint. Labor preselected 2015 Davenport state by-election candidate Mark Ward. The Nick Xenophon Team announced Mitcham councillor Karen Hockley as their candidate. ABC psephologist Antony Green's 2016 federal election guide for South Australia stated NXT had a "strong chance of winning lower house seats and three or four Senate seats". Flint won the contest. Flint held on narrowly on 53.5 percent of the two-party vote on a swing of 3.6 percent, making the seat marginal once again.

A redistribution ahead of the 2019 federal election pared back the Liberal margin to 2.7 percent. This came even as Boothby absorbed Glenelg and much of the Holdfast Bay area from neighbouring Hindmarsh. Flint won reelection again, despite suffering a swing of 1.3 points. With a margin of 1.3 points, Boothby was the most marginal seat in South Australia and one of the most marginal metropolitan Coalition seats in Australia at the 2022 election.

On 26 February 2021, Flint announced her retirement from parliament to take effect at the 2022 Australian federal election. Vinnies SA CEO Louise Miller-Frost was preselected by Labor in mid-2021 and won the seat at the 21 May 2022 federal election with 4.66% swing. Flint sought to regain Boothby in 2025, but Miller-Frost retained it on a swing of 7.8 percent. This was enough to boost her margin to 11 percent, the strongest result for Labor in the seat's history and enough to make it a safe Labor seat on paper.

== Members ==
| Image | Member | Party | Term | Notes |
|---|---|---|---|---|
| | Lee Batchelor (1865–1911) | Labour | 16 December 1903 – 8 October 1911 | Previously held the Division of South Australia. Served as a minister under Watson and Fisher. Died in office |
| | David Gordon (1865–1946) | Liberal | 11 November 1911 – 31 May 1913 | Lost seat. Later elected to the South Australian Legislative Council in 1913 |
| | George Dankel (1864–1926) | Labor | 31 May 1913 – 14 November 1916 | Previously held the South Australian House of Assembly seat of Torrens. Retired |
| | George Dankel (1864–1926) | National Labor | 14 November 1916 – 17 February 1917 | Previously held the South Australian House of Assembly seat of Torrens. Retired |
| | George Dankel (1864–1926) | Nationalist | 17 February 1917 – 26 March 1917 | Previously held the South Australian House of Assembly seat of Torrens. Retired |
| | William Story (1857–1924) | Nationalist | 5 May 1917 – 16 December 1922 | Previously a member of the Senate. Served as Chief Government Whip in the House under Hughes. Lost seat |
| | Jack Duncan-Hughes (1882–1962) | Liberal Union | 16 December 1922 – 1925 | Lost seat. Later elected to the Senate in 1931 |
| | Jack Duncan-Hughes (1882–1962) | Nationalist | 1925 – 17 November 1928 | Lost seat. Later elected to the Senate in 1931 |
| | John Price (1882–1941) | Labor | 17 November 1928 – March 1931 | Previously held the South Australian House of Assembly seat of Port Adelaide. Served as Chief Government Whip in the House under Lyons. Died in office |
| | John Price (1882–1941) | Independent | March 1931 – 7 May 1931 | Previously held the South Australian House of Assembly seat of Port Adelaide. Served as Chief Government Whip in the House under Lyons. Died in office |
| | John Price (1882–1941) | United Australia | 7 May 1931 – 23 April 1941 | Previously held the South Australian House of Assembly seat of Port Adelaide. Served as Chief Government Whip in the House under Lyons. Died in office |
| | Grenfell Price (1892–1977) | United Australia | 24 May 1941 – 21 August 1943 | Lost seat |
| | Thomas Sheehy (1899–1984) | Labor | 21 August 1943 – 10 December 1949 | Did not contest in 1949. Failed to win the Division of Kingston |
| | Sir John McLeay Sr. (1893–1982) | Liberal | 10 December 1949 – 31 October 1966 | Previously held the South Australian House of Assembly seat of Unley. Served as Speaker during the Menzies and Holt Governments. Retired. Son was John McLeay Jr. |
| | John McLeay Jr. (1922–2000) | Liberal | 26 November 1966 – 22 January 1981 | Served as minister under Fraser. Resigned to retire from politics. Father was John McLeay Sr. |
| | Steele Hall (1928–2024) | Liberal | 21 February 1981 – 29 January 1996 | Served as Premier of South Australia from 1968 to 1970. Previously a member of the Senate. Retired |
| | Andrew Southcott (1967–) | Liberal | 2 March 1996 – 9 May 2016 | Retired |
| | Nicolle Flint (1978–) | Liberal | 2 July 2016 – 11 April 2022 | Retired |
| | Louise Miller-Frost (1967–) | Labor | 21 May 2022 – present | Incumbent |

== Election results ==
2025 Australian federal election: Boothby
| Party | Candidate | Votes | % | ±% |
|---|---|---|---|---|
| Labor | Louise Miller-Frost | 50,015 | 42.62 | +10.30 |
| Liberal | Nicolle Flint | 38,117 | 32.48 | −5.51 |
| Greens | Joanna Wells | 20,046 | 17.08 | +1.88 |
| One Nation | Tonya Scott | 3,560 | 3.03 | +0.99 |
| Trumpet of Patriots | Nicole Hussey | 3,250 | 2.77 | +2.29 |
| Family First | Samuel Prior | 2,351 | 2.00 | +2.00 |
| Total formal votes | | 117,339 | 97.42 | +1.86 |
| Informal votes | | 3,113 | 2.58 | −1.86 |
| Turnout | | 120,452 | 93.00 | +0.46 |
Two-party-preferred result
| Labor | Louise Miller-Frost | 71,698 | 61.10 | +7.82 |
| Liberal | Nicolle Flint | 45,641 | 38.90 | −7.82 |
| Labor hold | | Swing | +7.82 | |

== See also ==
- 2016 Australian federal election
- Results of the Australian federal election, 2016 (South Australia)
