= John Price (South Australian politician) =

Australian politician

John Lloyd Price
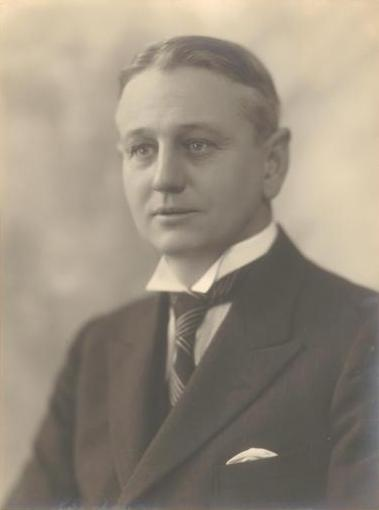

Member of the Australian Parliament for Boothby
- In office 17 November 1928 – 23 April 1941
- Preceded by: Jack Duncan-Hughes
- Succeeded by: Grenfell Price

13th Agent-General for South Australia
- In office 22 April 1925 – 22 April 1928
- Preceded by: Edward Lucas
- Succeeded by: Lionel Hill

Personal details
- Born: 14 February 1882 Everton, Liverpool, England
- Died: 23 April 1941 (aged 59) Highgate, South Australia
- Party: Labor (1915–31); UAP (1931–41)
- Occupation: Trade unionist, railwayman

John Lloyd (Jack) Price (14 February 1882 – 23 April 1941) was an Australian politician and trade unionist. He was an Australian Labor Party member of the South Australian House of Assembly for Port Adelaide from 1915 to 1925. He later served in the Australian House of Representatives for Boothby from 1928 until his death in 1941, but left the Labor Party and joined the United Australia Party, following the 1931 Labor split over government responses to the Great Depression.

== Early life and professional career ==
Price was born in Everton in Liverpool, England, the son of Thomas Price, the future first Labor Premier of South Australia, and his wife Anne Elizabeth (née Lloyd). His family migrated to South Australia in March 1883 and settled at Hawthorn, where Price was educated at Mitcham Public School, Unley Public School, the Adelaide Business College and the South Australian School of Mines. He worked in the clerical branch of the state railways from June 1898 until his election to the House of Assembly in 1915. He volunteered for service in World War I along with several brothers, but was rejected.

He was secretary of the Railway Officers' Association and the state branch of the Federated Masters' and Engineers' Association, president of the South Australian Government General Workers' Association and the Port Adelaide Trades and Labour Council, and later president of the United Trades and Labour Council and state president of the Labor Party. He was both a councillor and alderman of the City of Port Adelaide, serving from 1916 to 1924, and was president of the Largs Bay Progressive Association.

== State politics ==
Price was elected to the South Australian House of Assembly at the 1915 state election for the safe Labor seat of Port Adelaide. He remained with the Labor Party in the 1917 Labor split, after which he became secretary to the parliamentary Labor Party and Opposition Whip. He was Government Whip in the government of John Gunn from 1924 to 1925. In March 1925, he was appointed to a three-year term as Agent-General in London by the Gunn government; he had previously been tipped as a potential minister. His resignation necessitated a 1925 by-election in Port Adelaide, which was won by Labor candidate John Stanley Verran.

== Federal politics ==
In 1928, he was elected to the Australian House of Representatives as the Labor member for Boothby, defeating sitting Nationalist Jack Duncan-Hughes. He was secretary to the parliamentary Labor Party from 1929, but left the Labor Party in the 1931 Labor split, in which several Labor MPs merged with the Nationalists to form the United Australia Party under the leadership of Joseph Lyons. He later served as secretary to the parliamentary United Australia Party and Government Whip from 1940 until his death.

He died in office in 1941 at the age of 59; he had "not been in robust health" for two years, but his death was sudden and unexpected. His death raised serious concerns that the Menzies government could fall if his seat were lost in a by-election. However, UAP candidate Grenfell Price held the seat in the resulting by-election, although the government subsequently fell in August anyway.

Parliament of South Australia
Preceded by Henry Chesson; Thompson Green	Member for Port Adelaide; 1915–1925; Served alongside: MacGillivray, Verran, Condon	Succeeded by John Stanley Verran
Diplomatic posts
Preceded by Edward Lucas	Agent-General for South Australia; 1925–1928	Succeeded by Henry Barwell
Parliament of Australia
Preceded by Jack Duncan-Hughes	Member for Boothby; 1928–1941	Succeeded by Grenfell Price
