= David Gordon (Australian politician) =

Australian politician (1865–1946)

The Honourable Sir David Gordon
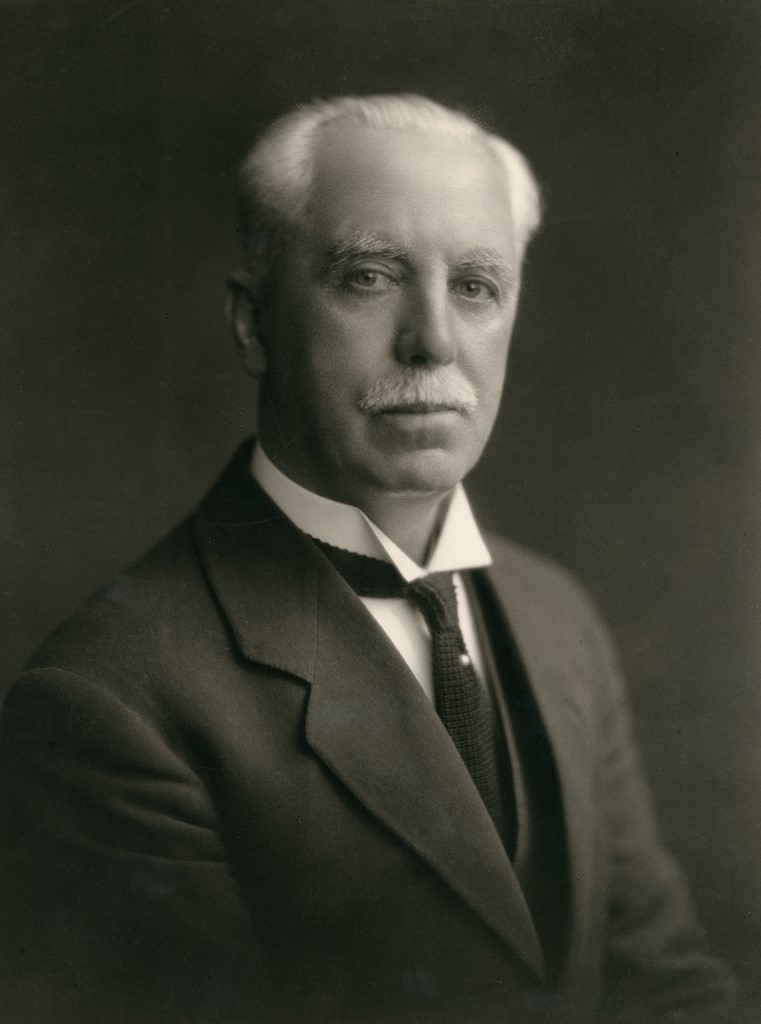

President of the Legislative Council of South Australia
- In office 7 July 1932 – 29 February 1944
- Preceded by: Sir Lancelot Stirling
- Succeeded by: Sir Walter Duncan

Member of the South Australian Legislative Council
- In office 15 November 1913 – 28 April 1944
- Preceded by: John Duncan
- Succeeded by: Reginald Rudall

Member of the Australian Parliament for Boothby
- In office 11 November 1911 – 31 May 1913
- Preceded by: Lee Batchelor
- Succeeded by: George Dankel

Personal details
- Born: David John Gordon; 4 May 1865 Riverton, South Australia
- Died: 12 February 1946 (aged 80) Unley Park, South Australia
- Party: Commonwealth Liberal Party
- Spouse: Anna Peel (m.1888)
- Occupation: Journalist

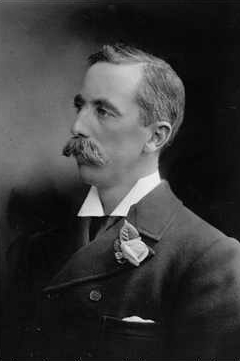

Sir David John Gordon (4 May 1865 – 12 February 1946) was an Australian politician. He was a member of the Australian House of Representatives from 1911 to 1913, before going into state politics and becoming a member of the South Australian Legislative Council from 1913 to 1944 (president from 1932). He was briefly Minister of Education and Minister of Repatriation under SA Premier Archibald Peake in 1917.

== Early life ==
Born in Riverton, South Australia, the son of Thomas Gordon, Scottish carpenter, miller, and farmer, Gordon was educated at Stanley Grammar School, Watervale before his family moved to Ardrossan, Yorke Peninsula where he worked on the family farm.

Gordon moved to Adelaide and worked as a grain merchant. He became a deacon of the Congregational Church and met Anna Louise Peel, a pianist at his local church, whom he married on 4 April 1888. Later that year he joined the South Australian Register, with whom he was employed for about 20 years, initially in their Port Adelaide office, then progressed through the ranks as commercial and financial editor and chief of the reporting staff, and agricultural editor of The Observer (where he sometimes wrote under the pseudonym "Wuronga"), and contributed leading articles to both papers. He was in the press gallery of the Legislative Council and the House of Assembly for 17 years, and for 10 years was chief of the Hansard staff. As "Timoleon", he contributed the "City Scratchings" column in The Kapunda Herald from 1901 to 1909.

He was invited to accompany Clement Giles on his expedition to central Australia, riding 1,500 miles (2,400 km) on horseback. On his return journey he interviewed Lord Kintore, who was returning from Port Darwin, at Charlotte Waters, and accompanied him to Adelaide. Returning from the trek, Gordon became an enthusiastic supporter of the development of central Australia, writing numerous books and articles on the subject over the next twenty years, including The Central State and The 'Nile' of Australia. Additionally, Gordon edited several editions of the annual Handbook of South Australia.

Gordon regularly advocated for the improvement of the farming and pastoral industries in South Australia, as well as transportation throughout the state. His level of influence was such that he was able to persuade the government to establish a freezing works at Port Adelaide.

== Federal politics ==
Involved in liberal politics, Gordon unsuccessfully stood as a Liberal candidate for the Senate at the 1910 election, before his election as a member of the House of Representatives at the 1911 Boothby by-election following the death of Labor incumbent Lee Batchelor. In parliament Gordon was a vocal supporter of the development of South and central Australia and was a member of the Royal Commission on the fruit industry. In August 1913 he was elected president of the Australian Liberal Union.

== State politics ==
Gordon lost his seat at the 1913 federal election, but switched to state politics, as the Liberal Union candidate for the vacancy in the Legislative Council in the representation of the Midland District, caused by the sudden death of Sir John Duncan and was elected to the South Australian Legislative Council in November 1913.

Gordon was appointed Minister for Education and Repatriation by Premier Archibald Peake in July 1917 but resigned the next month, in protest at the Commonwealth Liberal Party's coalition with the Nationalist Party of Australia, and rejected further offers of ministerial posts from Peake.

Gordon became party leader in the council in 1918 and president of the South Australian Legislative Council from 1932 until his retirement from politics in 1944. In 1927 he chaired the Australian delegation to the International Economic Conference, Geneva.—

He served variously as president of the Associated Chambers of Commerce of Australia, the Adelaide Chamber of Commerce, and president of the South Australian branch of Toc H and the Sailors' and Soldiers' Fathers' Association. He was also a director of numerous companies.

=== Knighthood ===
Gordon was made a knight bachelor in the 1925 New Year Honours. His appointment was controversial, as he was nominated by the federal Bruce–Page government against the wishes of the state Labor government led by John Gunn. State attorney-general Bill Denny publicly criticised the appointment as partisan, although The Advertiser described it as "a well-merited recognition of distinguished service … both to the Commonwealth and the State".

== Personal life ==
Referred to as "a highly principled man with a strong personality", Gordon died at his home in Victoria Avenue, Unley Park, South Australia, survived by two sons and two daughters (his wife predeceasing him by 12 years). One son, Douglas, served in the Legislative Council while the second, John, was a pilot who was awarded the Military Cross in World War I.

== Bibliography ==
- Gordon, David John Our Undeveloped Territory: Through Central Australia and Northern Territory
- Gordon, David John The Gateway of the Interior: How to Utilise Australia's Great Waterways (1902)
- Gordon, David John The Central State: Its Progress and Resources (1903)
- Gordon, David John The Nile of Australia: Nature's Gateway to the Interior (1906) **
- Gordon, David John Conquering the Desert: Conservation, Reclamation, Irrigation (1907)
- Gordon, David John Handbook of South Australia (officially used by the Government. 1908)
- Gordon, David John Official Year Book of S.A. (prepared under the authority of the Government, 1912 and 1913)
- Gordon, David John Wealth and Waste (paper read before Chamber of Manufactures, 1912)
- Gordon, David John and Ryan, Victor H. (eds.) Handbook of South Australia (prepared for the British Association for the Advancement of Science 1914)**
- Gordon, David John The Aftermath: Making Good War's Wastage (1916)
- Gordon, David John Problems of Transportation: the Joseph Fisher Commercial Lecture before the University of Adelaide (1914)
- Gordon, David John The Livestock Industry of Australia (paper read before the first conference of Australian meat exporters, Sydney 1916)

** Copy held by Flinders University Library.

Parliament of Australia
Preceded by Lee Batchelor	Member for Boothby; 1911–1913	Succeeded by George Dankel
