= George Dankel =

Australian politician

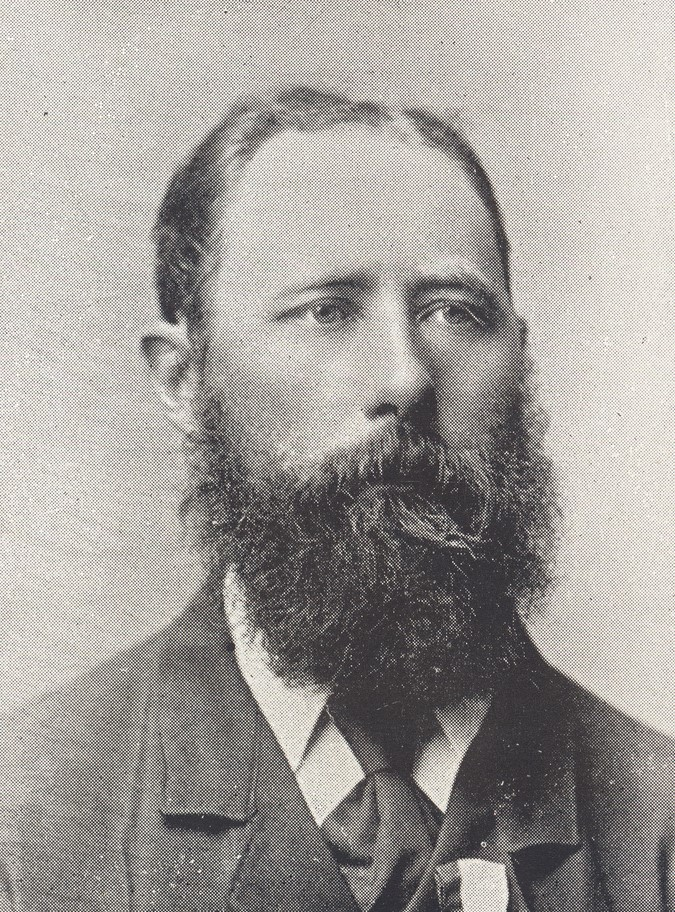

Member of the Australian Parliament for Boothby
- In office 31 May 1913 – 26 March 1917
- Preceded by: David Gordon
- Succeeded by: William Story

Personal details
- Born: 6 March 1864 Braunschweig, Duchy of Brunswick
- Died: 31 May 1926 (aged 62) Kensington, South Australia
- Party: Labor (1913–17); Nationalist (1917)

George Casper Adolph Maria Prosper Dankel (6 March 1864 – 31 May 1926) was one of the first members of the Australian House of Representatives who was not of ancestral origin to the areas of the United Kingdom in the 19th century. He was born in the Duchy of Brunswick, which a few years after his birth became part of the German Empire and, given the social tensions generated by World War I, it is understandable he chose to retire in the 1917 election. He was a member for the Division of Boothby in South Australia from 1913 until 1917. Prior to that, he was a state MP in the seat of Torrens from 1905 to 1912. He was a member of the Australian Labor Party, switching to the Nationalist Party of Australia in 1917.

Dankel left the German Empire for Australia at the age of 15, primarily to avoid military service. He worked in the country for several years before settling in Kensington and opening a butcher shop. He served on the district council and was a foundation member of the Australian Labor Party. He was elected as a member for Torrens in 1905, 1906 and 1910, but was defeated in 1912. In 1913, he defeated the sitting Liberal member, David Gordon, to be elected as the member for Boothby, and was re-elected in 1914.

With World War I underway, the All-British League secured 17,000 signatures on a petition calling for Dankel's resignation or dismissal from parliament. He continued to attend regularly, but rarely spoke in the chamber. With Billy Hughes and 21 others, he left the ALP to form the Nationalist Party, which was in favour of compulsory military service. Both Dankel and Jacob Stumm, the only other German-born MP, chose not to stand in the 1917 election.

Parliament of Australia
Preceded by David Gordon	Member for Boothby; 1913–1917	Succeeded by William Story
South Australian House of Assembly
Preceded by John Darling Jr. John Jenkins; George Soward; Thomas Price; Frederick Coneybeer	Member for Torrens; 1905–1912; With: Crawford Vaughan; Thomas Smeaton; Thomas Price / Thomas Ryan; Frederick Coneybeer	Succeeded by Crawford Vaughan; Herbert Hudd; Thomas Smeaton; Herbert Parsons; Frederick Coneybeer
