= 1911 Boothby by-election =

| ← 1910 | 11 November 1911 | 1913 → |

The Boothby seat in the House of Representatives
- Registered: 35,460
- Turnout: 18,702 (52.8%)
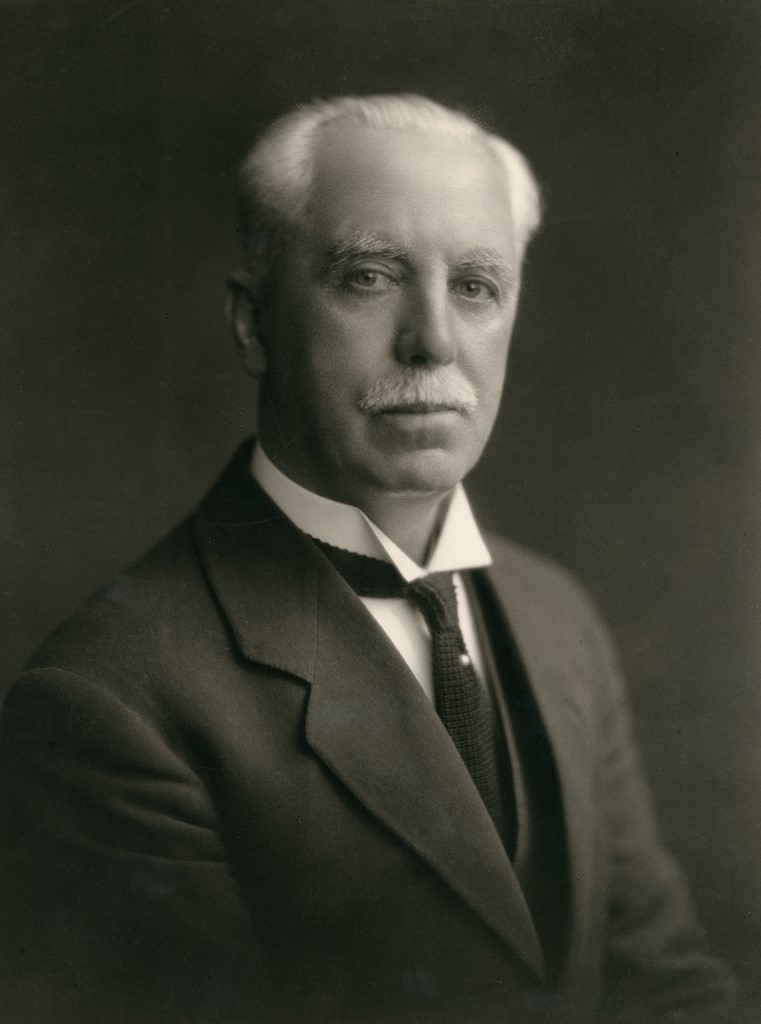

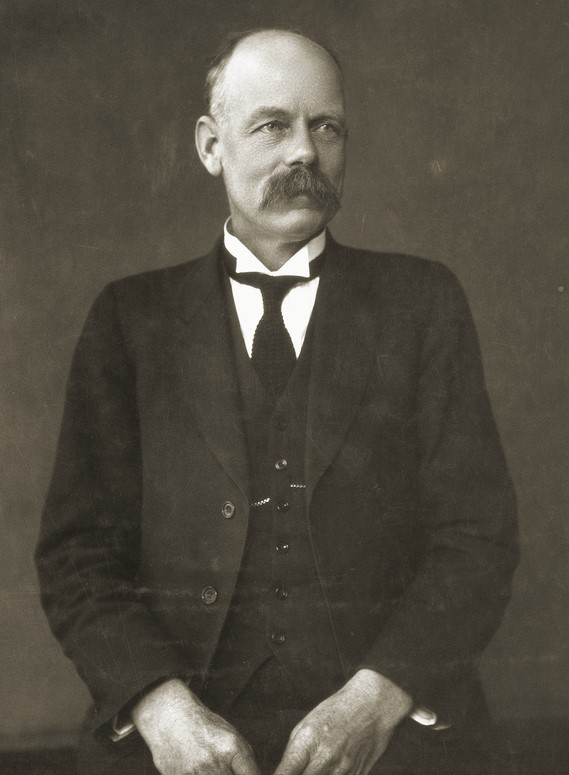
| | First party | Second party |
|---|---|---|
| Candidate | David Gordon | James Jelley |
| Party | Commonwealth Liberal | Labour |
| Popular vote | 10,656 | 8,008 |
| Percentage | 57.1% | 42.9% |
| Swing | ▲57.1 | ▼20.9 |
MP before election
Lee Batchelor
Labour
Elected MP
David Gordon
Commonwealth Liberal

A by-election was held for the Australian House of Representatives seat of Boothby on 11 November 1911. This was triggered by the death of Labour MP Lee Batchelor.

The by-election was won by Liberal candidate David Gordon.

== Results ==
1911 Boothby by-election
| Party | Candidate | Votes | % | ±% |
|---|---|---|---|---|
| Liberal | David Gordon | 10,656 | 57.09 | +57.09 |
| Labour | James Jelley | 8,008 | 42.91 | −20.92 |
| Total formal votes | | 18,664 | 99.80 | +7.98 |
| Informal votes | | 38 | 0.20 | −7.98 |
| Registered electors | | 35,460 | | |
| Turnout | | 18,702 | 52.74 | −2.63 |
| Liberal gain from Labour | | | | |
