= 1941 Boothby by-election =

| 24 May 1941 |
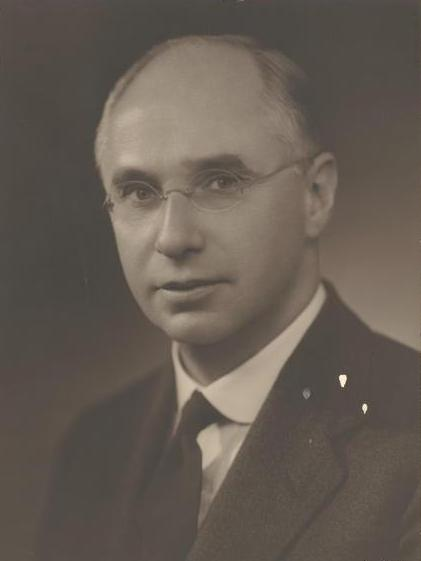
| | First party | Second party |
|---|---|---|
| | | ALP |
| Candidate | Grenfell Price | Tom Lawton |
| Party | United Australia | Labor |
| Popular vote | 36,624 | 28,041 |
| Percentage | 56.6% | 43.4% |
| Swing | ▼0.8pp | ▲15.4pp |
MP before election
John Price
United Australia
Elected MP
Grenfell Price
United Australia

A by-election was held for the Australian House of Representatives seat of Boothby on 24 May 1941. This was triggered by the death of United Australia Party (UAP) MP John Price.

The by-election was won by UAP candidate Grenfell Price, who was not related to his predecessor.

== Results ==
Boothby by-election, 1941
| Party | Candidate | Votes | % | ±% |
|---|---|---|---|---|
| United Australia | Grenfell Price | 36,624 | 56.6 | −0.8 |
| Labor | Tom Lawton | 28,041 | 43.4 | +15.4 |
| Total formal votes | | 64,665 | 97.9 | |
| Informal votes | | 1,378 | 2.1 | |
| Turnout | | 66,043 | 90.6 | |
| United Australia hold | | Swing | −8.6 | |
