= Andrew Southcott =

Australian politician

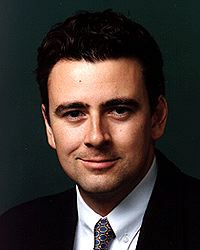

Member of the Australian Parliament for Boothby
- In office 2 March 1996 – 9 May 2016
- Preceded by: Steele Hall
- Succeeded by: Nicolle Flint

Personal details
- Born: 15 October 1967 (age 59) Panorama, South Australia
- Party: Liberal Party of Australia
- Spouse: Kate Southcott (née Simpson)
- Children: 2
- Education: Flinders University; University of Adelaide
- Occupation: Medical practitioner
- Website: AndrewSouthcott.com.au

Military service
- Branch/service: Royal Australian Naval Reserve
- Rank: Lieutenant

Andrew John Southcott (born 15 October 1967) is an Australian politician and medical practitioner. He was the Liberal member for the House of Representatives seat of Boothby from the 1996 election until he stood down at the 2016 election.

== Early life ==
Southcott was born in Panorama, South Australia, and attended Paringa Park Primary School, and St Peter's College.

He studied medicine at University of Adelaide and was a medical practitioner before entering politics, serving as an intern and surgical trainee at the Royal Adelaide Hospital and as a surgical registrar at the Flinders Medical Centre and Repatriation General Hospital, Daw Park. While in office he has completed a Bachelor of Economics at Flinders University and a Master of Business Administration at the University of Adelaide.

== Political career ==
Southcott joined the Liberal party in 1989 while serving as president of the Adelaide Medical Students Society. He defeated Senate leader and future Defence Minister Robert Hill, a moderate, in a pre-selection battle for the seat of Boothby in 1994. Southcott is from the conservative faction of the Liberal Party of Australia.

Southcott was elected to the House of Representatives seat of Boothby at the 1996 election and remained a backbencher throughout the Howard government.

Election in Boothby	1996	1998	2001	2004	2007	2010	2013
First preference %	53.4	48.2	47.9	50.6	46.3	44.8	51.1
Two-party-preferred %	61.6	57.5	57.4	55.4	52.9	50.8	57.7

At the 2004 election, despite a solid national two-party swing and vote to the Liberals, Boothby became a marginal Liberal seat for the first time in over half a century, with Labor's Chloë Fox reducing the Liberals to a marginal 5.4 percent two-party margin. Labor's Nicole Cornes reduced the Liberals to a marginal 2.9 percent two-party margin at the 2007 election, while at the 2010 election Labor's Annabel Digance reduced the Liberals to just a 0.75 percent two-party margin (638 votes), which put Boothby ahead of neighbouring Sturt as the most marginal seat in South Australia. However, Boothby became a fairly safe Liberal seat again at the 2013 election.

Southcott was a supporter of Republicanism in Australia.

Southcott was chair of the Parliament's Joint Standing Committee on Treaties from 2003 until 2007.

Following the Coalition's defeat at the 2007 election, Southcott was appointed by party leader Brendan Nelson to the Outer Shadow Ministry as Shadow Minister for Employment Participation, and Apprenticeships and Training.

Resulting from the ascendancy of Malcolm Turnbull at the 2008 Liberal leadership ballot, Southcott became Shadow Minister for Employment Participation, Training and Sport.

After the ascendancy of Tony Abbott at the 2009 Liberal leadership ballot, Southcott was dropped from the Outer Shadow Ministry and demoted to Shadow Parliamentary Secretary for Regional Health Services, Health and Wellbeing. Following the 2010 election, Southcott was appointed Shadow Parliamentary Secretary for Primary Healthcare.

Resulting from the 2013 election where the Abbott government took office, Southcott was dropped and not included in the incoming Abbott ministry, returning to the backbench where he remained.

Following the resignation of Bronwyn Bishop, Southcott ran for the position of Speaker of the Australian House of Representatives in August 2015 but was unsuccessful.

=== Parliamentary resignation ===
On 4 September 2015, Southcott announced that he would retire from parliament at the 2016 election, and resume his medical career. Southcott said his decision not to re-contest Boothby was "completely unrelated" to being unsuccessful in running for the Speakership. The Liberals pre-selected doctoral student and newspaper columnist Nicolle Flint as their candidate in Boothby at the 2016 election.

Parliament of Australia
Preceded by Steele Hall	Member for Boothby; 1996–2016	Succeeded by Nicolle Flint
