= Louise Miller-Frost =

Australian politician

Louise Miller-Frost MP
- Miller-Frost in 2026

Member of the Australian House of Representatives for Boothby
- Incumbent
- Assumed office 21 May 2022
- Preceded by: Nicolle Flint

Personal details
- Born: Louise Jane Miller; 13 March 1967 (age 59) Hollywood, Worcestershire, England
- Party: Australian Labor Party

Louise Jane Miller-Frost (née Miller; born 13 March 1967) is an Australian politician elected to represent the division of Boothby in the 2022 Australian federal election. She is a member of the Australian Labor Party.

== Early life ==
Miller-Frost was born in Hollywood, Worcestershire, England, and was 18 months old when her family migrated to Adelaide in 1968. She attended Para Hills East Infant School and Primary School, The Heights High School, Banksia Park High School and Seymour College.

Her father died unexpectedly when she was thirteen years old.

Miller-Frost was the first in her family to attend university, completing an undergraduate Bachelor of Applied Science at the University of South Australia, then going on to complete a Master of Arts and Master of Business Administration at UNISA, and a Master of Public Health at Adelaide University. She is a fellow of the Australian Institute of Company Directors.

== Career ==
Miller-Frost has had an extensive career as an executive in a range of organisations including SA Health, City of Port Adelaide Enfield, and City of Burnside. In 2017 she became chief executive of Catherine House Inc, a women's homelessness service. In her time at Catherine House, she oversaw the implementation of National Disability Insurance Scheme funding at the non-profit. On 10 March 2020, she became chief executive of St Vincent de Paul Society SA as the COVID-19 pandemic hit. In May 2021, the South Australian government under Steven Marshall changed its funding model for homeless accommodation providers, which resulted in the St Vincent de Paul Society SA losing funding. Miller-Frost was critical of the Marshall government's plans, and expressed a desire for more social housing in the state.

She has also sat on a number of boards, notably the Medical Board of Australia, Winston Churchill Memorial Trust, Animal Welfare League SA and as Chair of UnitingCare Wesley Bowden. She was also co-chair of the Adelaide Zero Project to end homelessness, and SA Co-chair of Anti-Poverty Week in 2020 and 2021.

== Politics ==
Miller-Frost was preselected by the Australian Labor Party to run for Parliament in the seat of Boothby in the 2022 federal election. Boothby had been held by the Liberal Party of Australia since 1949, but in the 2019 federal election the margin had only been 1.4%. Incumbent Nicolle Flint chose not to run for re-election citing a toxic workplace in her valedictory speech, meaning Miller-Frost's main opponents were Rachel Swift from the Liberal Party, and independent candidate Jo Dyer. Miller-Frost won the election, with Dyer conceding defeat on the night of the election and Swift conceding the following day. She is the 1,224th member of the House of Representatives, and the 14th Member for Boothby.

At the May 2025 election Miller-Frost was re-elected with an increased margin of 11.07%, against former member Nicolle Flint and Greens candidate, Mitcham Councillor Joanna Wells.

=== Political views ===
Miller-Frost has expressed support for meaningful action on climate change, noting her frustration at the "lack of recognition of the dangers facing us as a result of climate change and also of the amazing economic opportunities" Australia could take advantage of. She also campaigned strongly on integrity in politics and in favour of a federal ICAC. She reflected on these issues, and her work in the poverty and homelessness sectors in her first speech.

== Personal life ==
Miller-Frost lives in Cumberland Park, South Australia, with her husband Kim Cheater. She has three sons, triplets who were born in 1999, and three stepsons.

Parliament of Australia
Preceded by Nicolle Flint	Member for Boothby; 2022–present	Incumbent
