= John McLeay Sr. =

Australian politician (1893–1982)

The Honourable Sir John McLeay KCMG, MM
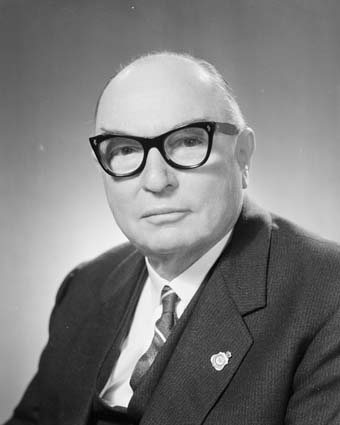

13th Speaker of the Australian House of Representatives
- In office 29 August 1956 – 31 October 1966
- Preceded by: Archie Cameron
- Succeeded by: Sir William Aston

Member of the Australian Parliament for Boothby
- In office 10 December 1949 – 31 October 1966
- Preceded by: Thomas Sheehy
- Succeeded by: John McLeay Jr.

Personal details
- Born: 19 November 1893 Port Clinton, South Australia
- Died: 22 June 1982 (aged 88) Adelaide, South Australia
- Party: Independent (1938–1941); Liberal (1949–1966)
- Spouse: Eileen Elden (m. 1921–1971)
- Relations: John McLeay Jr. (son); George McLeay (brother)
- Profession: Businessman

Military service
- Allegiance: Australia
- Branch/service: Australian Imperial Force
- Years of service: 1915–1919
- Rank: Lance Corporal
- Unit: 13th Australian Field Ambulance
- Battles/wars: First World War
- Awards: Military Medal

Sir John McLeay, KCMG, MM (19 November 1893 – 22 June 1982) was an Australian politician. He was a member of the Liberal Party and served in the House of Representatives from 1949 to 1966, representing the Division of Boothby in South Australia. He was Speaker of the House of Representatives for a record 10-year term, from 1956 to 1966. McLeay was a businessman by profession, and before entering federal politics served as Mayor of Unley (1935–1937), as a member of the South Australian House of Assembly (1938–1941), and as Lord Mayor of Adelaide (1946–1950).

== Early life ==
McLeay was born on 23 November 1893 in Port Clinton, South Australia. He was the second of six children born to Margaretta (née Barton) and George McLeay. His older brother George McLeay Jr. also entered federal politics, serving as a government minister. Their father, a farmer, died in 1914, and their mother moved the family to Adelaide. Their horse became exhausted along the way and the older children had to walk the last 60 miles (97 km) on foot. McLeay attended state schools in Port Clinton and Unley until the age of fourteen, leaving school to work as an errand boy. He later studied at Muirden College, a business college in Adelaide, and worked as a commercial traveller.

McLeay enlisted in the Australian Imperial Force (AIF) in May 1915. He served with medical units in the Middle East and on the Western Front. While stationed in France as a stretcher-bearer with the 13th Field Ambulance, he was awarded the Military Medal for bravery on the opening day of the Second Battle of Villers-Bretonneux in April 1918. He was formally discharged from the military in October 1919.

After returning to Australia, McLeay went into business with his brother George as accountants and general agents. Their firm McLeay Bros later evolved into a wholesale and retail furnishing business. He married Eileen Elden in 1921, with whom he had two sons and a daughter.

== State and local politics ==
Elected to the Adelaide suburban Unley City Council in 1924, McLeay served as Mayor of Unley from 1935 to 1937, resigning to contest the state Electoral district of Unley as an independent at the 1938 election. He was one of 14 lower house MPs to be elected as an independent, which as a grouping won 40 percent of the primary vote, more than either of the major parties. At the time, there were 39 MPs in the legislature. Tom Stott was the de facto leader of the independent caucus within parliament. McLeay lost Unley at the 1941 election and later acknowledged that his three-year period in the House of Assembly was a waste of time, in terms of his being able to accomplish anything as an independent.

== Federal politics ==
Nevertheless McLeay did not stay out of politics for long. He was elected Lord Mayor of Adelaide in 1946, and held that office till 1949, during which time he gained Liberal and Country League pre-selection for the federal electorate of Boothby in south-central Adelaide for that year's federal election. The seat had been held by Labor incumbent Thomas Sheehy, but a redistribution notionally made the seat a marginal LCL seat. While Sheehy made an unsuccessful bid to transfer to neighbouring Kingston, McLeay won Boothby on a large swing of 9.3 percent, turning it into a safe LCL seat in one stroke. He entered the Australian House of Representatives as part of that year's massive Coalition landslide.

In 1956 McLeay became Speaker of the House. He remained Speaker for more than 10 years (a record that still stands), until he resigned from parliament on 31 October 1966. In 1959, following the 1958 federal election, he was challenged unsuccessfully for the Liberals' speakership nomination by Percy Joske. He was re-elected to the speakership unopposed in 1959, 1962, and 1964. During his tenure there were only three dissent motions against his rulings, and he received praise from Robert Menzies, Arthur Calwell, and Gough Whitlam. Calwell said that he would have asked McLeay to stay on in the position if Labor won the 1961 election, while Whitlam described him as "ideal for the post" and wrote that "in my experience and observation the House has not had a better Speaker".

== Later life ==
Following his retirement, McLeay served as Chairman of McLeay Brothers Ltd. and director of other companies, as well as member of the Tramways Trust Board, the State Bank of South Australia and the council of the University of Adelaide. He also served as president of the Adelaide Legacy Club, the South Australian Retail Furniture Association, the South Australian Playground Association and the South Australian Tree Planters Association.

Knight was created a Knight Commander of the Order of St Michael and St George in the Queen's New Years Honours of 1962 for political and community services. McLeay had family members who carried on the tradition of political activism. His brother George and his son John Jnr both served in the federal parliament, John Jnr having succeeded him in the electorate of Boothby.

McLeay, who was nicknamed "Marrow Jack" for his prowess in vegetable-growing. died in Adelaide after a short illness. He had been predeceased by his wife, Eileen, Lady McLeay. A state funeral was held in his honour.

Parliament of Australia
Preceded by Archie Cameron	Speaker of the Australian House of Representatives; 1956–1966	Succeeded by Sir William Aston
Preceded by Thomas Sheehy	Member for Boothby; 1949–1966	Succeeded by John McLeay Jr.
Parliament of South Australia
New seat	Member for Unley; 1938–1941	Succeeded by Colin Dunnage
