= John McLeay Jr. =

Australian politician

The Honourable John McLeay
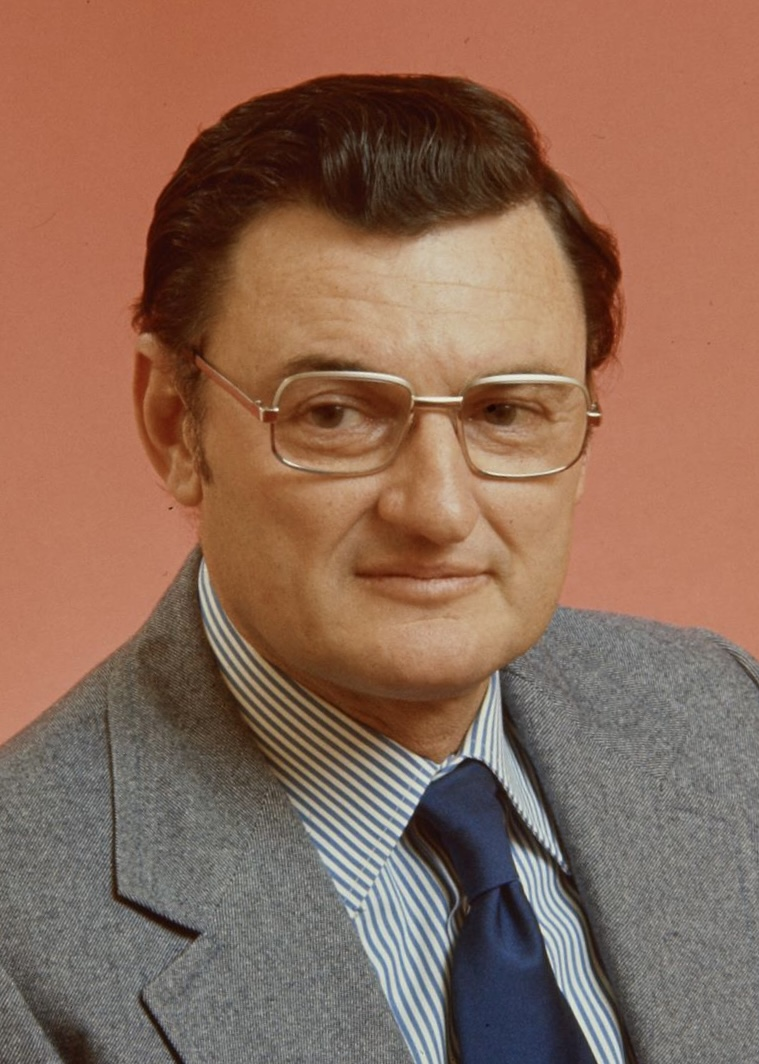
- McLeay in 1974

Minister for Administrative Services
- In office 5 December 1978 – 3 November 1980
- Prime Minister: Malcolm Fraser
- Preceded by: Fred Chaney
- Succeeded by: Kevin Newman

Minister for Construction
- In office 22 December 1975 – 5 December 1978
- Prime Minister: Malcolm Fraser
- Preceded by: John Carrick (Housing and Construction)
- Succeeded by: Ray Groom

Member of the Australian Parliament for Boothby
- In office 26 November 1966 – 22 January 1981
- Preceded by: John McLeay Sr.
- Succeeded by: Steele Hall

Personal details
- Born: 30 March 1922 Adelaide, South Australia
- Died: 26 December 2000 (aged 78)
- Party: Liberal
- Spouse: Clythe
- Relations: John McLeay Sr. (father)
- Occupation: Local councillor

John Elden McLeay (30 March 1922 – 26 December 2000) was an Australian politician. He was a member of the Liberal Party and represented the Division of Boothby in South Australia from 1966 to 1981. He held ministerial office in the Fraser government as Minister for Construction (1975–1978) and Administrative Services (1978–1980).

== Early life ==
McLeay was born in Adelaide, the son of Sir John McLeay, a federal politician, as was his brother, George McLeay. McLeay was educated at Scotch College and volunteered for the second Australian Imperial Force in 1941 and served in New Guinea as a gunner from 1942 to 1943. He was a member of the Unley City Council from 1949 to 1970 and was mayor from 1961 to 1963.

== Political career ==
After his father's retirement as the member for Boothby, McLeay was elected in his place at the 1966 election, representing the Liberal Party. He was supportive of the white minority governments in South Africa and Rhodesia. While visiting the latter in February 1970, he was interviewed on a Rhodesian Broadcasting Corporation television program, during which he controversially described Australia as "almost a Communist state" and praised Rhodesia as "much more advanced in some ways than we are". Prime Minister John Gorton subsequently stated that the government had no intentions of relaxing sanctions on Rhodesia. The interview increased McLeay's profile in Australia and his name became "a by-word for right-wing opinions" according to The Canberra Times.

McLeay was Assistant Minister assisting the Minister for Civil Aviation from August 1971 until the defeat of the McMahon government at the December 1972 election. He was appointed Minister for Construction in the Fraser ministry from December 1975 until December 1978, when he was appointed Minister for Administrative Services. He was not reappointed to the ministry in November 1980 and resigned from parliament in January 1981.

== Later life ==
McLeay was Australia's Consul General to Los Angeles from 1981 to 1983. He was survived by his wife, Clythe and their three sons.

== Notes ==
Political offices
Preceded by John Carrick	Minister for Construction; 1975–78	Succeeded by Ray Groom
Preceded by Fred Chaney	Minister for Administrative Services; 1978–80	Succeeded by Kevin Newman
Parliament of Australia
Preceded by John McLeay Sr.	Member for Boothby; 1966–81	Succeeded by Steele Hall
Diplomatic posts
Preceded by Peter Barbour	Australian Consul-General in Los Angeles; 1981–1984	Succeeded by Basil Teasey
